= 1997–98 National Professional Soccer League season =

National Professional Soccer League
- Season: 1997–98
- Champions: Milwaukee Wave
- Matches: 260
- Top goalscorer: Hector Marinaro (87)
- Highest attendance: 18,197; Philadelphia at Milwaukee (March 13)
- Average attendance: 6,369

The 1997–98 National Professional Soccer League season was the fourteenth season for the league. Also marks the twentieth season of professional Division 1 indoor soccer.

== League standings ==
=== American Conference ===
==== East Division ====
Pos	Team	Pld	W	L	GF	GA	GD	PCT	GB
1	Philadelphia KiXX	40	26	14	569	484	+85	.650	—
2	Harrisburg Heat	40	21	19	530	518	+12	.525	5
3	Baltimore Spirit	40	12	28	487	569	−82	.300	14

Source: RSSSF

==== Central Division ====
Pos	Team	Pld	W	L	GF	GA	GD	PCT	GB
1	Milwaukee Wave	40	28	12	593	486	+107	.700	—
2	Cleveland Crunch	40	21	19	627	612	+15	.525	7
3	Cincinnati Silverbacks	40	15	25	563	604	−41	.375	13

Source: RSSSF

=== National Conference ===
==== North Division ====
Pos	Team	Pld	W	L	GF	GA	GD	PCT	GB
1	Buffalo Blizzard	40	21	19	495	504	−9	.525	—
2	Edmonton Drillers	40	18	22	428	418	+10	.450	3
3	Montreal Impact	40	16	24	455	518	−63	.400	5
4	Detroit Rockers	40	13	27	464	571	−107	.325	8

Source: RSSSF

==== Midwest Division ====
Pos	Team	Pld	W	L	GF	GA	GD	PCT	GB
1	St. Louis Ambush	40	27	13	625	513	+112	.675	—
2	Wichita Wings	40	22	18	575	559	+16	.550	5
3	Kansas City Attack	40	20	20	442	497	−55	.500	7

Source: RSSSF

== Playoffs ==
Conference Quarterfinals
A4	Harrisburg Heat	14	5	18
A5	Cincinnati Silverbacks	12	27	13
N4	Kansas City Attack	8	14	–
N5	Edmonton Drillers	4	8	–

Conference Semifinals
A1	Milwaukee Wave	19	18	–
A4	Harrisburg Heat	4	11	–
American Conference
A2	Philadelphia KiXX	10	29	–
A3	Cleveland Crunch	4	27	–
N1	St. Louis Ambush	17	18	–
N4	Kansas City Attack	8	15	–
National Conference
N2	Buffalo Blizzard	16	14	–
N3	Wichita Wings	19	15	–

Conference Finals
A1	Milwaukee Wave	7	19	12	16	–
A2	Philadelphia KiXX	9	5	3	10	–
N1	St. Louis Ambush	17	10	14	19	–
N3	Wichita Wings	9	8	21	11	–

Championship
A1	Milwaukee Wave	16	18	17	8	21	–	–
N1	St. Louis Ambush	14	10	14	12	10	–	–

== Scoring leaders ==
GP = Games Played, G = Goals, A = Assists, Pts = Points

Player	Team	GP	G	A	Pts
Hector Marinaro	Cleveland	36	87	43	212
Zoran Karić	Cleveland	35	62	91	206
Gino DiFlorio	Cincinnati	40	67	48	177
Joe Reiniger	St. Louis	39	61	39	164
Bernie Lilavois	Cincinnati	40	66	24	150
Bojan Vučković	Baltimore	32	60	38	148
Michael King	Milwaukee	40	52	35	139
Rudy Pikuzinski	Buffalo	38	53	38	139
Kevin Sloan	Philadelphia	36	57	23	131
Franklin McIntosh	St. Louis	34	38	55	127

== League awards ==
- Most Valuable Player: Victor Nogueira, Milwaukee
- Defender of the Year: Matt Knowles, Philadelphia
- Rookie of the Year: Travis Roy, Detroit
- Goalkeeper of the Year: Victor Nogueira, Milwaukee
- Coach of the Year: Keith Tozer, Milwaukee
- Playoffs MVP: Victor Nogueira, Milwaukee

== All-NPSL Teams ==
First Team	Position	Second Team	Third Team
Victor Nogueira, Milwaukee	G	Scott Hileman, Edmonton	Pete Pappas, Philadelphia
Daryl Doran, St. Louis	D	Wes Wade, Kansas City	Richard Chinapoo, Harrisburg
Matt Knowles, Philadelphia	D	Omid Namazi, Philadelphia	Randy Prescott, Detroit Todd Rattee, Edmonton
Zoran Karić, Cleveland	M	Gino DiFlorio, Cincinnati	Kevin Sloan, Philadelphia
Hector Marinaro, Cleveland	F	Michael King, Milwaukee	Bojan Vučković, Baltimore
Joe Reiniger, St Louis	F	Erik Rasmussen, Wichita	Rudy Pikuzinski, Buffalo

== All-NPSL Rookie Teams ==
First Team	Position	Second Team
Kevin Zimmerman, Kansas City	G	Paul Shepherd, Edmonton
Kyle Swords, Harrisburg	D	Bo Simic, Cleveland
Chris Jahr, Milwaukee	D	O'Neil Brown, Edmonton
Garret Kusch, Wichita	M	Kyle Bosch, Edmonton
Shawn Beyer, Kansas City	F	Matt Tirschman, Baltimore
Travis Roy, Detroit	F	Shawn Boney, Cleveland
