= 1994–95 National Professional Soccer League season =

National Professional Soccer League
- Season: 1994–95
- Champions: St. Louis Ambush
- Matches: 240
- Top goalscorer: Hector Marinaro (99)
- Highest attendance: 14,738 Buffalo – St. Louis (March 10)
- Average attendance: 5,333

The 1994–95 National Professional Soccer League season was the eleventh season for the league.

== League standings ==
=== American Division ===
Pos	Team	Pld	W	L	PF	PA	PD	PCT	GB
1	Cleveland Crunch	40	30	10	742	524	+218	.750	—
2	Harrisburg Heat	40	23	17	594	526	+68	.575	7
3	Baltimore Spirit	40	23	17	615	572	+43	.575	7
4	Buffalo Blizzard	40	20	20	579	552	+27	.500	10
5	Dayton Dynamo	40	15	25	548	671	−123	.375	15
6	Canton Invaders	40	6	34	443	752	−309	.150	24

Source: RSSSF

=== National Division ===
Pos	Team	Pld	W	L	PF	PA	PD	PCT	GB
1	St. Louis Ambush	40	30	10	711	465	+246	.750	—
2	Kansas City Attack	40	29	11	641	460	+181	.725	1
3	Milwaukee Wave	40	23	17	535	459	+76	.575	7
4	Detroit Rockers	40	18	22	508	546	−38	.450	12
5	Wichita Wings	40	17	23	480	583	−103	.425	13
6	Chicago Power	40	6	34	420	706	−286	.150	24

Source: RSSSF

== Playoffs ==
First Round
A1	Cleveland Crunch	22	19	19
A4	Buffalo Blizzard	10	21	15
American Division
A2	Harrisburg Heat	17	15	14
A3	Baltimore Spirit	4	17	6
N1	St. Louis Ambush	15	16	–
N4	Detroit Rockers	12	10	–
National Division
N2	Kansas City Attack	10	20	16
N3	Milwaukee Wave	12	9	9

Second Round
A1	Cleveland Crunch	7	18	12	–	–
A2	Harrisburg Heat	17	24	16	–	–
N1	St. Louis Ambush	40	18	21	11	25
N2	Kansas City Attack	22	22	6	12	14

Finals
A2	Harrisburg Heat	9	8	7	11	–	–	–
N1	St. Louis Ambush	19	18	12	14	–	–	–

== Scoring leaders ==
GP = Games Played, G = Goals, A = Assists, Pts = Points

Player	Team	GP	G	A	Pts
Hector Marinaro	Cleveland	32	99	53	255
Zoran Karić	Cleveland	31	78	96	241
Mark Moser	St. Louis	40	89	26	195
Dennis Brose	Dayton	37	86	27	191
Goran Hunjak	Kansas City	40	69	52	181
Paul Dougherty	Buffalo	39	81	31	171
Kevin Sloan	Baltimore	40	73	32	165
Michael King	Milwaukee	40	61	34	164
Wes Wade	Kansas City	40	43	71	153
Sean Bowers	Detroit	40	58	31	148

== League awards ==
- Most Valuable Player: Hector Marinaro, Cleveland
- Defender of the Year: Sean Bowers, Detroit
- Rookie of the Year: Henry Gutierrez, Cleveland
- Goalkeeper of the Year: Jamie Swanner, St. Louis
- Coach of the Year: Zoran Savic, Kansas City

== All-NPSL Teams ==
First Team	Position	Second Team	Third Team
Jamie Swanner, St. Louis	G	Victor Nogueira, Milwaukee	Warren Westcoat, Kansas City
Iain Fraser, Kansas City	D	Kevin Hundelt, St. Louis	Daryl Doran, St. Louis
Sean Bowers, Detroit	D	Kim Røntved, Wichita	Matt Knowles, Milwaukee
Zoran Karić, Cleveland	M	Paul Dougherty, Buffalo	Pato Margetic, Detroit
Hector Marinaro, Cleveland	F	Dennis Brose, Dayton	Kevin Sloan, Baltimore
Mark Moser, St. Louis	F	Goran Hunjak, Kansas City	Wes Wade, Kansas City

== All-NPSL Rookie Teams ==
First Team	Position	Second Team
Ken McDaniel, Kansas City	G	Trey Harrington, Wichita
Scott Schweitzer, Cleveland	D	Omid Namazi, Baltimore
Chris Martinez, Wichita	D	Brian Thiel, Detroit
Tony Sanneh, Chicago	M	Shannon Murray, Canton
Brian Loftin, Kansas City	F	Don D'Ambra, Milwaukee
Henry Gutierrez, Cleveland	F	Noah Epstein, Wichita
