= 1993–94 National Professional Soccer League season =

National Professional Soccer League
- Season: 1993–94
- Champions: Cleveland Crunch
- Matches: 240
- Top goalscorer: Hector Marinaro (113)
- Highest attendance: 15,595 Dayton – St. Louis (October 29)
- Average attendance: 5,709

The 1993–94 National Professional Soccer League season was the tenth season for the league.

== League standings ==
=== American Division ===
Pos	Team	Pld	W	L	PF	PA	PD	PCT	GB
1	Baltimore Spirit	40	26	14	594	553	+41	.650	—
2	Cleveland Crunch	40	23	17	717	613	+104	.575	3
3	Buffalo Blizzard	40	19	21	499	515	−16	.475	7
4	Harrisburg Heat	40	19	21	557	585	−28	.475	7
5	Canton Invaders	40	18	22	537	593	−56	.450	8
6	Dayton Dynamo	40	15	25	653	665	−12	.375	11

Source: RSSSF

=== National Division ===
Pos	Team	Pld	W	L	PF	PA	PD	PCT	GB
1	St. Louis Ambush	40	25	15	676	566	+110	.625	—
2	Detroit Rockers	40	24	16	575	577	−2	.600	1
3	Wichita Wings	40	22	18	598	572	+26	.550	3
4	Milwaukee Wave	40	20	20	496	486	+10	.500	5
5	Chicago Power	40	15	25	501	616	−115	.375	10
6	Kansas City Attack	40	14	26	566	628	−62	.350	11

Source: RSSSF

== Playoffs ==
First Round
A1	Baltimore Spirit	9	7	–
A4	Harrisburg Heat	21	13	–
American Division
A2	Cleveland Crunch	24	12	13
A3	Buffalo Blizzard	16	16	8
N1	St. Louis Ambush	20	12	11
N4	Milwaukee Wave	29	8	10
National Division
N2	Detroit Rockers	15	19	–
N3	Wichita Wings	14	16	–

Second Round
A4	Harrisburg Heat	14	10	10
A2	Cleveland Crunch	13	15	21
N1	St. Louis Ambush	16	15	–
N2	Detroit Rockers	7	10	–

Finals
A2	Cleveland Crunch	6	21	29	17	–
N2	St. Louis Ambush	26	14	8	15	–

== Scoring leaders ==
GP = Games Played, G = Goals, A = Assists, Pts = Points

Player	Team	GP	G	A	Pts
Zoran Karić	Cleveland	36	85	104	267
Hector Marinaro	Cleveland	37	113	43	253
Andy Chapman	Detroit	38	83	31	178
David Doyle	St. Louis	38	75	42	175
Gino DiFlorio	Canton	34	67	31	159
Michael King	Milwaukee	39	58	46	158
Jon Parry	Kansas City	40	72	31	157
Franklin McIntosh	Harrisburg	39	47	55	151
Paul Wright	Baltimore	35	62	43	146
Dennis Brose	Dayton	28	66	22	145

== League awards ==
- Most Valuable Player: Zoran Karić, Cleveland
- Defender of the Year: Sean Bowers, Detroit
- Rookie of the Year: Tarik Walker, Baltimore
- Goalkeeper of the Year: Victor Nogueira, Milwaukee
- Coach of the Year: Daryl Doran, St. Louis

== All-NPSL Teams ==
=== First Team ===
Player	Pos.	Team
Victor Nogueira	G	Milwaukee
Sean Bowers	D	Detroit
Terry Woodberry	D	Wichita
Hector Marinaro	F	Cleveland
Zoran Karić	F	Cleveland
Andy Chapman	F	Detroit

=== Second Team ===
Player	Pos.	Team
Cris Vaccaro	G	Baltimore
George Fernandez	D	Cleveland
Daryl Doran	D	St. Louis
Pato Margetic	M	Chicago
David Doyle	F	St. Louis
Paul Wright	F	Baltimore

=== Third Team ===
Player	Pos.	Team
Bryan Finnerty	G	Detroit
Kim Røntved	D	Wichita
Doug Neely	D	Baltimore
Kevin Koetters	M	Kansas City
Franklin McIntosh	M	Harrisburg
Gino DiFlorio	F	Canton

== All-NPSL Rookie Teams ==
First Team	Pos.	Second Team
Rob Marinaro, Chicago	G	Shawn Boehmcke, Baltimore
Lance Johnson, Baltimore; Ed Pinon, Kansas City	D	Mike LaPosha, St. Louis; Troy Dayak, Cleveland
Tarik Walker, Baltimore; Kevin Groark, St. Louis; Joe Reiniger, St. Louis	F	Steve Snow, Chicago; Chugger Adair, Wichita; Rob Ukrop, Baltimore; Michael Gailey, Milwaukee
