= 1996–97 National Professional Soccer League season =

National Professional Soccer League
- Season: 1996–97
- Champions: Kansas City Attack; 2nd title
- Matches: 300
- Top goalscorer: Hector Marinaro (104)
- Highest attendance: 17,617 Wichita – Milwaukee (February 28)
- Average attendance: 5,650

The 1996–97 National Professional Soccer League season was the thirteenth season for the league.

== League standings ==
=== American Conference ===
==== East Division ====
Pos	Team	Pld	W	L	PF	PA	PD	PCT	GB
1	Harrisburg Heat	40	22	18	523	457	+66	.550	—
2	Baltimore Spirit	40	20	20	506	494	+12	.500	2
3	Philadelphia KiXX	40	17	23	451	593	−142	.425	5
4	Tampa Bay Terror	40	15	25	503	541	−38	.375	7

Source: RSSSF

==== Central Division ====
Pos	Team	Pld	W	L	PF	PA	PD	PCT	GB
1	Cleveland Crunch	40	29	11	772	550	+222	.725	—
2	Cincinnati Silverbacks	40	21	19	570	517	+53	.525	8
3	Columbus Invaders	40	5	35	479	895	−416	.125	24

Source: RSSSF

=== National Conference ===
==== North Division ====
Pos	Team	Pld	W	L	PF	PA	PD	PCT	GB
1	Buffalo Blizzard	40	21	19	545	469	+76	.525	—
2	Edmonton Drillers	40	21	19	538	475	+63	.525	—
3	Detroit Rockers	40	20	20	563	532	+31	.500	1
4	Toronto Shooting Stars	40	6	34	416	685	−269	.150	15

Source: RSSSF

==== Midwest Division ====
Pos	Team	Pld	W	L	PF	PA	PD	PCT	GB
1	St. Louis Ambush	40	27	13	637	545	+92	.675	—
2	Milwaukee Wave	40	26	14	525	472	+53	.650	1
3	Kansas City Attack	40	26	14	605	500	+105	.650	1
4	Wichita Wings	40	24	16	589	497	+92	.600	3

Source: RSSSF

== Playoffs ==
Conference Quarterfinals
A4	Baltimore Spirit	15	18	–
A5	Philadelphia KiXX	8	8	–
A3	Cincinnati Silverbacks	13	15	16
A6	Tampa Bay Terror	11	17	11
N3	Milwaukee Wave	6	9	–
N6	Edmonton Drillers	20	10	–
N4	Kansas City Attack	13	13	22
N5	Wichita Wings	11	14	5

Conference Semifinals
A1	Cleveland Crunch	14	21	14
A4	Baltimore Spirit	19	9	13
American Conference
A2	Harrisburg Heat	11	13	–
A3	Cincinnati Silverbacks	9	12	–
N1	St. Louis Ambush	19	9	16
N6	Edmonton Drillers	18	19	11
National Conference
N2	Buffalo Blizzard	12	11	–
N4	Kansas City Attack	18	13	–

Conference Finals
A1	Cleveland Crunch	11	13	17	14	–
A2	Harrisburg Heat	8	19	14	12	–
N1	St. Louis Ambush	11	16	11	–	–
N4	Kansas City Attack	15	22	13	–	–

Finals
A1	Cleveland Crunch	14	19	8	12	–	–	–
N4	Kansas City Attack	18	25	14	15	–	–	–

== Scoring leaders ==
GP = Games Played, G = Goals, A = Assists, Pts = Points

Player	Team	GP	G	A	Pts
Hector Marinaro	Cleveland	36	104	65	265
Zoran Karic	Cleveland	34	81	81	242
Dennis Brose	Detroit	39	102	51	236
Michael King	Milwaukee	38	72	44	185
Joe Reiniger	St. Louis	39	62	39	174
Mark Moser	St. Louis	37	82	24	165
Franklin McIntosh	Cincinnati	36	48	65	161
Goran Hunjak	Kansas City	39	61	42	151
Bojan Vučković	Baltimore	40	61	33	150
Nikola Vignjević	Cleveland	40	58	35	149

== League awards ==
- Most Valuable Player: Hector Marinaro, Cleveland
- Defender of the Year: Daryl Doran, St. Louis
- Rookie of the Year: Jason Dunn, Wichita
- Goalkeeper of the Year: Victor Nogueira, Milwaukee
- Coach of the Year: Ross Ongaro, Edmonton
- Finals MVP: Warren Westcoat, Kansas City

== All-NPSL Teams ==
First Team	Position	Second Team	Third Team
Victor Nogueira, Milwaukee	G	Carlos Peña, Cincinnati	Scott Hileman, Edmonton
Daryl Doran, St. Louis	D	Randy Prescott, Detroit	Genoni Martinez, Wichita
Wes Wade, Kansas City	D	Ricky Mobley, Milwaukee	Kim Røntved, Wichita
Zoran Karić, Cleveland	M	Joe Reiniger, St. Louis	Franklin McIntosh, Cincinnati
Hector Marinaro, Cleveland	F	Michael King, Milwaukee	Bojan Vučković, Baltimore
Dennis Brose, Detroit	F	Mark Moser, St. Louis	Goran Hunjak, Kansas City

== All-NPSL Rookie Teams ==
First Team	Position	Second Team
Pete Pappas, Philadelphia	G	Jim McCombs, Baltimore
Drew Callahan, Columbus	D	René Rivas, Buffalo
John Ball, Cleveland	D	Shayne Campbell, Edmonton
Adolfo Mella, Toronto	M	Michael Stephenson, Harrisburg
Jason Dunn, Wichita	F	Saša Zorić, Baltimore
Carmen D'Onofrio, Edmonton	F	Martin Dugas, Edmonton Emeka Moneme, Milwaukee
