= 1995–96 National Professional Soccer League =

National Professional Soccer League
- Season: 1995–96
- Champions: Cleveland Crunch; 2nd title
- Matches: 260
- Top goalscorer: Hector Marinaro (96)
- Highest attendance: 17,603 Baltimore – St. Louis (March 23)
- Average attendance: 5,069

The 1995–96 National Professional Soccer League season was the twelfth season for the league.

== League standings ==
=== American Division ===
Pos	Team	Pld	W	L	PF	PA	PD	PCT	GB
1	Cleveland Crunch	40	31	9	775	553	+222	.775	—
2	Baltimore Spirit	40	25	15	604	492	+112	.625	6
3	Harrisburg Heat	40	24	16	604	516	+88	.600	7
4	Buffalo Blizzard	40	21	19	562	586	−24	.525	10
5	Cincinnati Silverbacks	40	14	26	496	579	−83	.350	17
6	Tampa Bay Terror	40	14	26	544	621	−77	.350	17
7	Canton Invaders	40	5	35	425	706	−281	.125	26

Source: RSSSF

=== National Division ===
Pos	Team	Pld	W	L	PF	PA	PD	PCT	GB
1	Kansas City Attack	40	32	8	599	430	+169	.800	—
2	Milwaukee Wave	40	30	10	610	438	+172	.750	2
3	St. Louis Ambush	40	24	16	676	560	+116	.600	8
4	Wichita Wings	40	20	20	547	531	+16	.500	12
5	Detroit Rockers	40	14	26	485	607	−122	.350	18
6	Chicago Power	40	6	34	381	689	−308	.150	26

Source: RSSSF

== Playoffs ==
Division Semifinals
A1	Cleveland Crunch	25	17	17
A4	Buffalo Blizzard	15	20	11
American Division
A2	Baltimore Spirit	16	7	–
A3	Harrisburg Heat	11	6	–
N1	Kansas City Attack	10	11	–
N4	Wichita Wings	9	9	–
National Division
N2	Milwaukee Wave	10	10	12
N3	St. Louis Ambush	9	12	14

Division Finals
A1	Cleveland Crunch	15	16	14	13	–
A2	Baltimore Spirit	11	14	23	12	–
N1	Kansas City Attack	18	14	4	10	20
N3	St. Louis Ambush	16	25	1	30	9

Finals
A1	Cleveland Crunch	18	17	24	19	20	16	–
N1	Kansas City Attack	28	22	12	9	16	12	–

== Scoring leaders ==
GP = Games Played, G = Goals, A = Assists, Pts = Points

Player	Team	GP	G	A	Pts
Hector Marinaro	Cleveland	33	96	58	247
Zoran Karić	Cleveland	27	62	61	184
Franklin McIntosh	Baltimore	36	48	77	177
Joe Reiniger	St. Louis	39	65	45	170
Shawn Medved	Cincinnati	40	61	53	164
Mark Moser	St. Louis	35	73	29	159
Dennis Brose	Detroit	32	59	33	151
Michael King	Milwaukee	35	59	31	148
Kevin Sloan	Baltimore	40	63	29	143
Bojan Vučković	Tampa Bay	35	63	23	142

== League awards ==
- Most Valuable Player: Hector Marinaro, Cleveland & Victor Nogueira, Milwaukee
- Defender of the Year: Matt Knowles, Milwaukee
- Rookie of the Year: Jason Willan, Detroit
- Goalkeeper of the Year: Victor Nogueira, Milwaukee
- Coach of the Year: Keith Tozer, Milwaukee

== All-NPSL Teams ==
First Team	Position	Second Team	Third Team
Victor Nogueira, Milwaukee	G	Scoop Stanisic, Harrisburg	Brett Phillips, Kansas City
Daryl Doran, St. Louis	D	Kevin Hundelt, St. Louis	Jim Schwab, Kansas City
Matt Knowles, Milwaukee	D	Mike Stankovic, Baltimore	Kim Røntved, Wichita
Zoran Karić, Cleveland	M	Danny Kelly, Harrisburg	Franklin McIntosh, Baltimore
Hector Marinaro, Cleveland	F	Kevin Koetters, Kansas City	Shawn Medved, Cincinnati
Joe Reiniger, St. Louis	F	Marcelo Carrera, Buffalo	Michael King, Milwaukee

== All-NPSL Rookie Teams ==
First Team	Position	Second Team
Drew Burwash, Canton	G	Todd Hoffard, Harrisburg
John Limniatis, Kansas City	D	Nick De Santis, Chicago
Rudy Doliscat, Buffalo	D	Todd Rattee, Milwaukee
Giuliano Oliviero, Milwaukee	M	Lenin Steenkamp, Tampa Bay
Jason Willan, Detroit	F	Mauro Biello, Buffalo
Paul Dailly, Wichita	F	Todd Dusosky, Cleveland
