= 1998–99 National Professional Soccer League season =

National Professional Soccer League
- Season: 1998–99
- Champions: Cleveland Crunch (3rd title)
- Matches: 260
- Top goalscorer: Hector Marinaro (84)
- Average attendance: 5,996

The 1998–99 National Professional Soccer League season was the fifteenth season for the league.

== League standings ==
=== American Conference ===
==== East Division ====
Pos	Team	Pld	W	L	GF	GA	GD	PCT	GB
1	Philadelphia KiXX	40	23	17	492	444	+48	.575	—
2	Harrisburg Heat	40	21	19	498	478	+20	.525	2
3	Baltimore Blast	40	19	21	519	579	−60	.475	4
4	Florida ThunderCats	40	12	28	351	527	−176	.300	11

Source: RSSSF

==== Central Division ====
Pos	Team	Pld	W	L	GF	GA	GD	PCT	GB
1	Cleveland Crunch	40	26	14	637	539	+98	.650	—
2	Milwaukee Wave	40	25	15	518	428	+90	.625	1
3	Montreal Impact	40	19	21	439	437	+2	.475	7

Source: RSSSF

=== National Conference ===
==== North Division ====
Pos	Team	Pld	W	L	GF	GA	GD	PCT	GB
1	Edmonton Drillers	40	23	17	497	439	+58	.575	—
2	Buffalo Blizzard	40	22	18	573	560	+13	.550	1
3	Detroit Rockers	40	12	28	430	510	−80	.300	11

Source: RSSSF

==== Midwest Division ====
Pos	Team	Pld	W	L	GF	GA	GD	PCT	GB
1	St. Louis Ambush	40	21	19	595	533	+62	.525	—
2	Kansas City Attack	40	19	21	527	539	−12	.475	2
3	Wichita Wings	40	18	22	538	601	−63	.450	3

Source: RSSSF

== Playoffs ==
Conference Quarterfinals
A4	Harrisburg Heat	10	8	–
A5	Montreal Impact	16	10	–
N4	Kansas City Attack	18	14	21
N5	Wichita Wings	10	16	10

Conference Semifinals
A1	Cleveland Crunch	9	28	15
A5	Montreal Impact	10	11	9
American Conference
A2	Philadelphia KiXX	9	13	14
A3	Milwaukee Wave	11	11	5
N1	Edmonton Drillers	12	22	17
N4	Kansas City Attack	16	8	13
National Conference
N2	St. Louis Ambush	13	12	12
N3	Buffalo Blizzard	16	10	11

Conference Finals
A1	Cleveland Crunch	15	30	–
A2	Philadelphia KiXX	0	15	–
N1	Edmonton Drillers	8	10	–
N2	St. Louis Ambush	16	16	–

Finals
A1	Cleveland Crunch	20	21	12	8	18
N2	St. Louis Ambush	9	10	14	12	12

== Scoring leaders ==
GP = Games Played, G = Goals, A = Assists, Pts = Points

Player	Team	GP	G	A	Pts
Hector Marinaro	Cleveland	34	84	38	195
Doug Miller	Buffalo	40	82	23	194
Erik Rasmussen	Wichita	34	72	54	184
Gino DiFlorio	Harrisburg	40	56	52	159
Ken Snow	Philadelphia	41	74	18	155
Zoran Karić	Cleveland	28	49	59	150
Franklin McIntosh	Cincinnati	36	48	65	161
Joe Reiniger	St. Louis	40	55	32	148
Mauro Biello	Montreal	40	53	37	135
Bojan Vučković	Detroit	38	49	24	118

== League awards ==
- Most Valuable Player: Hector Marinaro, Cleveland
- Defender of the Year: Kevin Hundelt, St. Louis
- Rookie of the Year: Martin Nash, Edmonton
- Goalkeeper of the Year: Victor Nogueira, Milwaukee
- Coach of the Year: Ross Ongaro, Edmonton
- Playoffs MVP: Hector Marinaro, Cleveland

== All-NPSL Teams ==
First Team	Position	Second Team	Third Team
Victor Nogueira, Milwaukee	G	Pat Onstad, Edmonton	Paolo Ceccarelli, Philadelphia
Kevin Hundelt, St. Louis	D	Genoni Martinez, Wichita	Glenn Carbonara, Milwaukee
Matt Knowles, Philadelphia	D	Todd Rattee, Edmonton	Droo Callahan, Detroit
Erik Rasmussen, Wichita	M	Zoran Karić, Cleveland	Mauro Biello, Montreal
Hector Marinaro, Cleveland	F	Gino DiFlorio, Harrisburg	Ken Snow, Philadelphia
Doug Miller, Buffalo	F	Joe Reiniger, St. Louis	Michael King, Milwaukee

== All-NPSL Rookie Teams ==
First Team	Position	Second Team
Nando Hernandez, St. Louis	G	Paul Shepherd, Edmonton
Nevio Pizzolitto, Montreal	D	Nicola Corneli, Montreal
Josh Timbers, Milwaukee	D	C.W. Raines, Wichita
Martin Nash, Edmonton	M	Lester Felician, Cleveland
Gerson Echeverry, Harrisburg	F	Tim Leonard, St. Louis
Ian Clarke, Milwaukee	F	Chris Stathopoulos, Montreal
