= 1999–2000 National Professional Soccer League season =

National Professional Soccer League
- Season: 1999–2000
- Champions: Milwaukee Wave (2nd title)
- Matches: 264
- Top goalscorer: Hector Marinaro (103)
- Average attendance: 5,430

The 1999–2000 National Professional Soccer League season was the sixteenth season for the league.

== League standings ==
=== American Conference ===
==== East Division ====
| Pos | Team | Pld | W | L | GF | GA | GD | PCT | GB |
|---|---|---|---|---|---|---|---|---|---|
| 1 | Baltimore Blast | 44 | 26 | 18 | 658 | 544 | +114 | .591 | — |
| 2 | Philadelphia KiXX | 44 | 24 | 20 | 599 | 564 | +35 | .545 | 2 |
| 3 | Harrisburg Heat | 44 | 16 | 28 | 626 | 707 | −81 | .364 | 10 |

Source: RSSSF

==== Central Division ====
| Pos | Team | Pld | W | L | GF | GA | GD | PCT | GB |
|---|---|---|---|---|---|---|---|---|---|
| 1 | Cleveland Crunch | 44 | 27 | 17 | 694 | 578 | +116 | .614 | — |
| 2 | Montreal Impact | 44 | 24 | 20 | 568 | 577 | −9 | .545 | 3 |
| 3 | Buffalo Blizzard | 44 | 19 | 25 | 495 | 617 | −122 | .432 | 8 |

Source: RSSSF

=== National Conference ===
==== North Division ====
| Pos | Team | Pld | W | L | GF | GA | GD | PCT | GB |
|---|---|---|---|---|---|---|---|---|---|
| 1 | Milwaukee Wave | 44 | 31 | 13 | 657 | 483 | +174 | .705 | — |
| 2 | Edmonton Drillers | 44 | 22 | 22 | 546 | 550 | −4 | .500 | 9 |
| 3 | Detroit Rockers | 44 | 19 | 25 | 498 | 539 | −41 | .432 | 12 |

Source: RSSSF

==== Midwest Division ====
| Pos | Team | Pld | W | L | GF | GA | GD | PCT | GB |
|---|---|---|---|---|---|---|---|---|---|
| 1 | Kansas City Attack | 44 | 24 | 20 | 694 | 628 | +66 | .545 | — |
| 2 | Wichita Wings | 44 | 21 | 23 | 596 | 614 | −18 | .477 | 3 |
| 3 | St. Louis Ambush | 44 | 11 | 33 | 488 | 718 | −230 | .250 | 13 |

Source: RSSSF

== Playoffs ==
Conference Semifinals
A1 | Cleveland Crunch | 21 | 21 | –
A4 | Montreal Impact | 7 | 11 | –
American Conference
A2 | Baltimore Blast | 15 | 25 | –
A3 | Philadelphia KiXX | 11 | 12 | –
N1 | Milwaukee Wave | 21 | 9 | –
N4 | Wichita Wings | 8 | 6 | –
National Conference
N2 | Kansas City Attack | 25 | 14 | –
N3 | Edmonton Drillers | 26 | 15 | –

Conference Finals
A1 | Cleveland Crunch | 28 | 25 | –
A2 | Baltimore Blast | 18 | 22 | –
N1 | Milwaukee Wave | 13 | 14 | –
N3 | Edmonton Drillers | 7 | 4 | –

Championship
A1 | Cleveland Crunch | 20 | 12 | 27 | 8 | 6
N1 | Milwaukee Wave | 18 | 18 | 15 | 14 | 19

== Scoring leaders ==
GP = Games Played, G = Goals, A = Assists, Pts = Points

| Player | Team | GP | G | A | Pts |
|---|---|---|---|---|---|
| Hector Marinaro | Cleveland | 38 | 103 | 34 | 231 |
| Gino DiFlorio | Harrisburg | 44 | 68 | 72 | 214 |
| Jason Dunn | Wichita | 44 | 95 | 32 | 203 |
| Clovis Simas | Kansas City | 42 | 92 | 22 | 175 |
| Joe Reiniger | St. Louis | 36 | 70 | 29 | 172 |
| Braeden Cloutier | Cleveland | 44 | 55 | 61 | 172 |
| Nikola Vignjević | Edmonton | 40 | 61 | 63 | 166 |
| Bernie Lilavois | Harrisburg | 37 | 71 | 29 | 156 |
| Domenic Mobilio | Montreal | 35 | 64 | 28 | 150 |
| Goran Hunjak | Philadelphia | 44 | 52 | 43 | 145 |

== League awards ==
- Most Valuable Player: Hector Marinaro, Cleveland
- Defender of the Year: James Dunn, Wichita
- Rookie of the Year: Clovis Simas, Kansas City
- Goalkeeper of the Year: Victor Nogueira, Milwaukee
- Coach of the Year: Keith Tozer, Milwaukee
- Finals MVP: Michael Richardson, Milwaukee

== All-NPSL Teams ==
| First Team | Position | Second Team | Third Team |
|---|---|---|---|
| Victor Nogueira, Milwaukee | G | Scott Hileman, Baltimore | Pete Pappas, Philadelphia |
| Michael Richardson, Milwaukee | D | Jeff Davis, Kansas City | Droo Callahan, Detroit |
| James Dunn, Wichita | D | Todd Rattee, Edmonton | Oscar Draguicevich, Cleveland |
| Gino DiFlorio, Harrisburg | M | Nikola Vignjević, Edmonton | Wes Wade, Kansas City |
| Hector Marinaro, Cleveland | F | Clovis Simas, Kansas City | Joe Reiniger, St. Louis |
| Jason Dunn, Wichita | F | Braeden Cloutier, Wichita | Denison Cabral, Baltimore |

== All-NPSL Rookie Teams ==
| First Team | Position | Second Team |
|---|---|---|
| Jim Larkin, Edmonton | G | Kaj Stefansen, Buffalo |
| Alen Sosa, Kansas City | D | Pat Morris, Philadelphia |
| Lovelace Ackah, Milwaukee | D | Kevin Kalish, St. Louis |
| Steve Klein, Harrisburg | M | Gary DePalma, Detroit |
| Drew Kaufman, Harrisburg | F | Jason Russell, Milwaukee |
| Clovis Simas, Kansas City | F | Dino Delevski, Wichita |
