= 1991–92 Major Soccer League season =

Major Soccer League
- Season: 1991–92
- Champions: San Diego Sockers (8th title)
- Matches: 140
- Goals: 1,603 (11.45 per match)
- Top goalscorer: (Canada) Hector Marinaro (53 goals)
- Average attendance: 7,844

The 1991–92 Major Soccer League season was the 14th and final season in league history and would end with the San Diego Sockers winning their tenth NASL or MISL title in 11 indoor seasons, and fifth MISL title in a row.

== Recap ==
After a relatively tranquil 1990-91 season, the league's unstable finances reared their head again at season's end. Attempts to find other financiers for the Kansas City Comets failed and the club folded. Both San Diego and the Dallas Sidekicks were saved by civic outpouring and new ownership groups. A reborn version of the Pittsburgh Spirit was announced on April 29, and the owners of the NHL's Buffalo Sabres expressed interest in putting a team in Buffalo. When faced with the instability of the league, however, both sets of potential owners decided to not put up the $350,000 line of credit needed to play in 1991–92.

Despite the upheaval, the seven teams left soldiered on. The regular season was wide open as playoff positioning went right down to the final game on the schedule. The Cleveland Crunch's George Fernandez scored in overtime to put Cleveland into the playoffs and knock the Wichita Wings out. Wichita had been in first place at the beginning of February, but a 6–13 finish doomed their chances at the postseason. Still, the playoffs themselves went according to form as San Diego defeated Baltimore and Dallas for their fifth straight MSL/MISL title.

There were early signs that the league would survive for another year. Attendance was up over 1990–91, and there were reports in April that the league planned on a 1992-93 season with all seven teams returning and an expanded schedule of 44 games.

However, the Tacoma Stars announced they were folding on June 5. The hoped-for expansion into Buffalo never came to pass as the Buffalo Blizzard chose to join the smaller and more financially stable National Professional Soccer League on June 18. Attempts to find new owners for the St. Louis Storm failed, leaving the MSL with five teams. Commissioner Earl Foreman announced the dissolution of the league on July 10.

The remaining teams scattered; San Diego and Dallas joined the Continental Indoor Soccer League, while Cleveland and Wichita joined the NPSL. Baltimore Blast owner Ed Hale decided not to join either league, folding the team instead. A new ownership group was awarded an NPSL expansion franchise for Baltimore called the Spirit and signed Blast coach Kenny Cooper to lead the team.

== Teams ==
Team	City/Area	Arena
Baltimore Blast	Baltimore, Maryland	Baltimore Arena
Cleveland Crunch	Cleveland, Ohio	Richfield Coliseum
Dallas Sidekicks	Dallas, Texas	Reunion Arena
San Diego Sockers	San Diego, California	San Diego Sports Arena
St. Louis Storm	St. Louis, Missouri	St. Louis Arena
Tacoma Stars	Tacoma, Washington	Tacoma Dome
Wichita Wings	Wichita, Kansas	Kansas Coliseum

== Map of clubs ==
Major Soccer League clubs

== Regular-season schedule ==
The 1991–92 regular season schedule ran from October 19, 1991, to April 4, 1992. At 40 games, it was the shortest schedule for the league since the 1980–81 season and the seven-team lineup was its smallest since the inaugural season of 1978–79.

== Final standings ==
Playoff teams in bold.

	W	L	Pct.	GB	GF	GA	Home	Road
**San Diego Sockers**	26	14	.650	–	243	186	15–5	11–9
**Dallas Sidekicks**	22	18	.550	4	231	229	16–4	6–14
**Cleveland Crunch**	20	20	.500	6	249	229	13–7	7–13
**Baltimore Blast**	19	21	.475	7	213	230	11–9	8–12
Wichita Wings	18	22	.450	8	228	236	12–8	6–14
Tacoma Stars	18	22	.450	8	198	242	15–5	3–17
St. Louis Storm	17	23	.425	9	241	251	12–8	5–15

== Playoffs ==
**Semifinals**
1	San Diego Sockers	4
4	Baltimore Blast	1
2	Dallas Sidekicks	4
3	Cleveland Crunch	2

**Championship series**
1	San Diego Sockers	4
2	Dallas Sidekicks	2

=== Semifinals ===
San Diego vs. Baltimore
Date	Away	Home	Attendance
April 8	Baltimore 4	**San Diego 5**	5,599
April 10	**Baltimore 7**	San Diego 6	5,621
April 14	**San Diego 5**	Baltimore 4	4,148
	Kevin Crow scored at 5:34 of overtime
April 16	**San Diego 6**	Baltimore 3	4,458
April 18	**San Diego 4**	Baltimore 3	4,594
**San Diego wins series 4–1**

Dallas vs. Cleveland
Date	Away	Home	Attendance
April 14	Cleveland 3	**Dallas 6**	7,474
April 16	Cleveland 6	**Dallas 7**	6,549
	Tatu scored at 3:59 of overtime
April 18	Dallas 6	**Cleveland 7**	8,752
	Chris Szanto scored at 1:39 of overtime
April 21	**Dallas 8**	Cleveland 7	7,289
	David Doyle scored at 7:59 of overtime
April 24	Dallas 7	**Cleveland 8**	7,913
	Zoran Karic scored at :47 of overtime
April 26	Cleveland 4	**Dallas 8**	6,824
**Dallas wins series 4–2**

=== Championship Series ===
San Diego vs. Dallas
Date	Away	Home	Attendance
April 30	Dallas 3	**San Diego 7**	5,269
May 2	Dallas 7	**San Diego 9**	7,921
May 5	**San Diego 5**	Dallas 4	6,703
	Paul Wright scored at 1:57 of overtime
May 8	San Diego 6	**Dallas 10**	8,655
May 9	San Diego 2	**Dallas 4**	8,171
May 12	Dallas 2	**San Diego 8**	10,117
**San Diego wins series 4–2**

== Team Attendance Totals ==
Club	Games	Total	Average
St. Louis Storm	20	205,323	10,266
San Diego Sockers	20	186,962	9,348
Baltimore Blast	20	164,129	8,206
Wichita Wings	20	164,127	8,206
Cleveland Crunch	20	141,120	7,056
Dallas Sidekicks	20	140,053	7,003
Tacoma Stars	20	96,426	4,821
**Overall**	**140**	**1,098,140**	**7,844**

=== Scoring leaders ===
GP = Games played, G = Goals, A = Assists, Pts = Points

Player	Team	GP	G	A	Pts
(Socialist Federal Republic of Yugoslavia) Zoran Karic	Cleveland Crunch	37	39	63	102
(United States) Preki	St Louis Storm	39	45	52	97
(Canada) Hector Marinaro	Cleveland Crunch	40	53	41	94
(Brazil) Tatu	Dallas Sidekicks	39	47	41	88
(United States) Chico Borja	Wichita Wings	33	32	52	84
(Canada) Dale Mitchell	Tacoma Stars	40	45	34	79
(United States) Paul Wright	San Diego Sockers	39	50	27	77
(United States) Dale Ervine	Wichita Wings	33	42	33	75
(Republic of Ireland) David Doyle	Dallas Sidekicks	40	51	23	74
(Canada) Branko Segota	St Louis Storm	34	47	25	72

== All-MISL Teams ==
First Team	Position	Second Team	Third Team
(United States) Victor Nogueira, San Diego	G	(United States) Joe Papaleo, Dallas	(Puerto Rico) Cris Vaccaro, Baltimore
(United States) Kevin Crow, San Diego	D	(Liberia) Ben Collins, San Diego	(United States) Danny Pena, Wichita
(Canada) Iain Fraser, Baltimore	D	(United States) George Fernandez, Cleveland	(Canada) Wes McLeod, Dallas
(Socialist Federal Republic of Yugoslavia) Zoran Karic, Cleveland	M	(United States) Chico Borja, Wichita	(Canada) Branko Segota, St Louis
(Brazil) Tatu, Dallas	F	(Republic of Ireland) David Doyle, Dallas	(Canada) Hector Marinaro, Cleveland
(United States) Preki, St Louis	F	(United States) Dale Ervine, Wichita	(United States) Paul Wright, San Diego

== League awards ==
Most Valuable Player: (United States) Victor Nogueira, San Diego

Scoring Champion: (Socialist Federal Republic of Yugoslavia) Zoran Karic, Cleveland

Pass Master: (Socialist Federal Republic of Yugoslavia) Zoran Karic, Cleveland

Defender of the Year: (United States) Kevin Crow, San Diego

Rookie of the Year: (United States) Tommy Tanner, Cleveland

Goalkeeper of the Year: (United States) Victor Nogueira, San Diego

Coach of the Year (England) Gordon Jago, Dallas

Championship Series Most Valuable Player: (Nigeria) Thompson Usiyan, San Diego

Championship Series Unsung Hero: (United States) Kevin Crow, San Diego
