= MISL team-by-team history =

The Major Indoor Soccer League (MISL) was the top professional indoor soccer league in the USA. The league was a member of both the United States Soccer Federation and FIFA. The MISL replaced the NPSL which folded in 2001. This version of the MISL recognizes NPSL history which dates back to 1984 when the NPSL was started as the AISA. A complete summary of the MISL team-by-team and season-by-season record book is defined within the contents of this section.

== Baltimore Blast ==
=== Championships ===
- 1983–1984 MISL Champions
- 2002–2003 MISL Champions
- 2003–2004 MISL Champions
- 2005–2006 MISL Champions
- 2007–2008 MISL Champions
- 2009 NISL Champions
- 2012–2013 MISL Champions

=== Division titles ===
- 1992–1993 NPSL American Division (as Baltimore Spirit)
- 1993–1994 NPSL American Division (as Baltimore Spirit)
- 1999–2000 NPSL East Division
- 2003–2004 MISL Eastern Division

=== Year-by-year record ===
Year	League	Reg. season	Playoffs
1992-93	NPSL II	1st American, 27-13	Lost Quarterfinals to Heat 3-16; 9-22
1993-94	NPSL II	1st American, 26-14	Lost First round to Heat 9-21; 7-13
1994-95	NPSL II	3rd American, 23-17	Lost First round to Heat 4-17; 17-15; 6-14
1995-96	NPSL II	2nd American, 25-15	Won Division Semifinals over Heat 16-11; 7-6; Lost Division Finals to Crunch 11-15; 14-16; 23-14; 12-13
1996-97	NPSL II	2nd East, 20-20	Won Conference Quarterfinals over Kixx 15-8; 18-8; Lost Conference Semifinals to Crunch 19-14; 9-21; 13-14
1997-98	NPSL II	3rd East, 12-28	Failed to Qualify
1998-99	NPSL II	3rd East, 19-21	Failed to Qualify
1999-00	NPSL II	1st East, 26-18	Won Conference Semifinals over Kixx 15-11; 25-12; Lost Conference Finals to Crunch 18-28; 22-25
2000-01	NPSL II	3rd American, 22-18	Won Conference Semifinals over Blizzard 9-8; 18-13; Lost Conference Finals to Kixx 23-19; 8-12; 15-16
2001-02	MISL II	4th MISL, 18-26	Lost Semifinals to Wave 12-18
2002-03	MISL II	3rd Eastern,18-18	Won Quarterfinals over Force 16-13; Won Semifinals over Kixx 8-6; Won Championship over Wave 12-19; 15-12; 13-12
2003-04	MISL II	1st Eastern, 25-11	Won Semifinals over Sidekicks 6-1; Won Championship over Wave 12-3; 8-4; 6-2
2004-05	MISL II	7th MISL, 15-24	Failed to Qualify
2005-06	MISL II	2nd MISL, 17-13	Won Semifinals over Wave 10-4; 8-10; 1-0; Won Championship over Steamers 4-2; 1-4; 1-0
2006-07	MISL II	5th MISL, 15-15	Failed to Qualify
2007-08	MISL II	3rd MISL, 19-11	Won Quarterfinals over Ironmen 22-10; 6-4; Won Semifinals over Wave 13-8; 14-13; Won Championship over La Raza 14-11
Totals	NPSL II	Reg. Season Record 200-164; Reg. Season Win % = .549	Playoff Record 12-15; Playoff Win % = .444
Totals	MISL II	Reg. Season Record 127-118; Reg. Season Win % = .518	Playoff Record 17-4; Playoff Win % = .810

== California Cougars ==
=== Championships ===
- None

=== Division titles ===
- None

=== Year-by-year record ===
Year	League	Reg. season	Playoffs
2005-06	MISL II	6th MISL, 10-20	Failed to Qualify
2006-07	MISL II	6th MISL, 7-23	Failed to Qualify
2007-08	MISL II	8th MISL, 11-19	Failed to Qualify
Totals	MISL II	Reg. Season Record 28-62; Reg. Season Win % = .311	Playoff Record 0-0; Playoff Win % = .000

== Chicago Storm ==
=== Championships ===
- None

=== Division titles ===
- None

=== Year-by-year record ===
Year	League	Reg. season	Playoffs
2004-05	MISL II	6th MISL, 18-21	Failed to Qualify
2005-06	MISL II	4th MISL, 13-17	Lost Semifinals to Steamers 1-7; 2-9
2006-07	MISL II	2nd MISL, 17-13	Lost Semifinals to Kixx 11-8; 6-10; 0-2
2007-08	MISL II	5th MISL, 15-15	Lost Quarterfinals to La Raza 10-8; 5-17; 0-3
Totals	MISL II	Reg. Season Record 63-66; Reg. Season Win % = .488	Playoff Record 2-6; Playoff Win % = .250

== Detroit Ignition ==
=== Championships ===
- None

=== Division titles ===
- 2006–07 MISL Regular season champions
- 2007–08 MISL Regular season champions

=== Year-by-year record ===
Year	League	Reg. season	Playoffs
2006-07	MISL II	1st MISL, 18-12	Won Semifinals over Wave 11-13; 10-8; 2-0; Lost Championship to Kixx 8-13
2007-08	MISL II	1st MISL, 22-8	Lost Semifinals to La Raza 11-15; 21-2; 0-2
Totals	MISL II	Reg. Season Record 40-20; Reg. Season Win % = .667	Playoff Record 3-4; Playoff Win % = .429

== Milwaukee Wave ==
=== Championships ===
- 1997–1998 NPSL Champions
- 1999–2000 NPSL Champions
- 2000–2001 NPSL Champions
- 2004–2005 MISL Champions

=== Division titles ===
- 1997–1998 NPSL Central Division
- 1999–2000 NPSL North Division
- 2000–2001 NPSL National Conference
- 2001–2002 MISL regular season champions
- 2002–2003 MISL Western Division
- 2003–2004 MISL Central Division
- 2004–2005 MISL regular season champions

=== Year-by-year record ===
Year	League	Reg. season	Playoffs
1984-85	AISA	6th AISA, 13-27	Failed to Qualify
1985-86	AISA	6th AISA, 11-29	Failed to Qualify
1986-87	AISA	4th North, 12-30	Failed to Qualify
1987-88	AISA	3rd AISA, 11-13	3rd Place in Challenge Cup; 6-6 Record (50 GF/51 GA)
1988-89	AISA	2nd AISA, 24-16	Lost Semifinals to Power 12-16; 14-10; 4-20
1989-90	AISA	2nd National, 21-19	Won First round over Power 8-6; 8-6; Lost Semifinals to Invaders 4-10; 4-12
1990-91	NPSL II	2nd National, 23-17	Lost First round to Rockers 9-14; 10-9; 10-23
1991-92	NPSL II	4th National, 18-22	Failed to Qualify
1992-93	NPSL II	5th National, 17-23	Failed to Qualify
1993-94	NPSL II	4th National, 20-20	Lost First round to Ambush 29-20; 8-12; 10-11
1994-95	NPSL II	3rd National, 23-17	Lost First round to Attack 12-10; 9-20; 9-16
1995-96	NPSL II	2nd National, 30-10	Lost Division Semifinals to Ambush 10-9; 10-12; 12-14
1996-97	NPSL II	2nd Midwest, 26-14	Lost Conference Quarterfinals to Drillers 6-20; 9-10
1997-98	NPSL II	1st Central, 28-12	Won Conference Semifinals over Heat 19-4; 18-11; Won Conference Finals over Kixx 7-9; 19-5; 12-3; 16-10; Won Championship over Ambush 16-14; 18-10; 17-14; 8-12; 21-10
1998-99	NPSL II	2nd Central, 25-15	Lost Conference Semifinals to Kixx 11-9; 11-13; 5-14
1999–2000	NPSL II	1st North, 31-13	Won Conference Semifinals over Wings 21-8; 9-6; Won Conference Finals over Drillers 13-7; 14-4; Won Championship over Crunch 18-20; 18-12; 15-27; 14-8; 19-6
2000-01	NPSL II	1st National, 24-16	Won Conference Semifinals over Attack 22-7; 2-12; 22-17; Won Conference Finals over Thunderhawks 18-14; 24-17; Won Championship over Kixx 16-12; 9-8; 10-8
2001-02	MISL II	1st MISL, 34-10	Won Semifinals over Blast 18-12; Lost Championship to Kixx 11-4; 4-11; 6-8
2002-03	MISL II	1st Western, 28-9	Won Semifinals over Comets 20-19; Lost Championship to Blast 19-12; 12-15; 12-13
2003-04	MISL II	1st Central, 26-9	Won Semifinals over Comets 7-3; Lost Championship to Blast 3-12; 4-8; 2-6
2004-05	MISL II	1st MISL, 24-15	Won Semifinals over Steamers 4-3; 6-5; Won Championship over Force 10-9; 10-9
2005-06	MISL II	3rd MISL, 17-13	Lost Semifinals to Blast 4-10; 10-8; 0-1
2006-07	MISL II	4th MISL, 16-14	Lost Semifinals to Ignition 13-11; 8-10; 0-2
2007-08	MISL II	2nd MISL, 22-8	Lost Semifinals to Blast 8-13; 13-14
Totals	AISA	Reg. Season Record 92-134; Reg. Season Win % = .407	Playoff Record 9-10; Playoff Win % = .474
Totals	NPSL II	Reg. Season Record 265-179; Reg. Season Win % = .770	Playoff Record 28-17; Playoff Win % = .622
Totals	MISL II	Reg. Season Record 167-78; Reg. Season Win % = .682	Playoff Record 11-13; Playoff Win % = .458

== Monterrey La Raza ==
=== Championships ===
- None

=== Division titles ===
- None

=== Year-by-year record ===
Year	League	Reg. season	Playoffs
2007-08	MISL II	4th MISL, 16-14	Won Quarterfinals over Storm 8-10; 17-5; 3-0; Won Semifinals over Ignition 15-11; 2-21; 2-0; Lost Championship to Blast 11-14
Totals	MISL II	Reg. Season Record 16-14; Reg. Season Win % = .533	Playoff Record 4-3; Playoff Win % = .667

== New Jersey Ironmen ==
=== Championships ===
- None

=== Division titles ===
- None

=== Year-by-year record ===
Year	League	Reg. season	Playoffs
2007-08	MISL II	6th MISL, 14-16	Lost Quarterfinals to Blast 10-22; 4-6
Totals	MISL II	Reg. Season Record 14-16; Reg. Season Win % = .467	Playoff Record 0-2; Playoff Win % = .000

== Orlando Sharks ==
=== Championships ===
- None

=== Division titles ===
- None

=== Year-by-year record ===
Year	League	Reg. season	Playoffs
2007-08	MISL II	9th MISL, 4-26	Failed to Qualify
Totals	MISL II	Reg. Season Record 4-26; Reg. Season Win % = .133	Playoff Record 0-0; Playoff Win % = .000

== Philadelphia Kixx ==
=== Championships ===
- 2001–2002 MISL Champions
- 2006–2007 MISL Champions

=== Division titles ===
- 1997–1998 NPSL East Division
- 1998–1999 NPSL East Division
- 2002–2003 MISL Eastern Division

=== Year-by-year record ===
Year	League	Reg. season	Playoffs
1996-97	NPSL II	3rd East, 17-23	Lost Conference Quarterfinals to Blast 8-15; 8-18
1997-98	NPSL II	1st East, 26-14	Won Conference Semifinals over Crunch 10-4; 29-27; Lost Conference Finals to Wave 9-7; 5-19; 3-12; 10-16
1998-99	NPSL II	1st East, 23-17	Won Conference Semifinals over Wave 9-11; 13-11; 14-5; Lost Conference Finals to Crunch 0-15; 15-30
1999-00	NPSL II	2nd East, 24-20	Lost Conference Semifinals to Blast 11-15; 12-25
2000-01	NPSL II	4th American, 22-18	Won Conference Semifinals over Heat 21-19; 19-14; Won Conference Finals over Blast 19-23; 12-8; 16-15; Lost Championship to Wave 12-16; 8-9; 8-10
2001-02	MISL II	2nd MISL, 30-14	Won Semifinals over Comets 18-13; Won Championship over Wave 4-11; 11-4; 8-6
2002-03	MISL II	1st Eastern, 24-12	Lost Semifinals to Blast 6-8
2003-04	MISL II	2nd Eastern, 20-16	Lost Quarterfinals to Comets 5-8
2004-05	MISL II	3rd MISL, 22-17	Lost Semifinals to Force 3-6; 6-10
2005-06	MISL II	5th MISL, 10-20	Failed to Qualify
2006-07	MISL II	3rd MISL, 17-13	Won Semifinals over Storm 8-11; 10-6; 2-0; Won Championship over Ignition 13-8
2007-08	MISL II	7th MISL, 12-18	Failed to Qualify
Totals	NPSL II	Reg. Season Record 112-92; Reg. Season Win % = .549	Playoff Record 9-14; Playoff Win % = .391
Totals	MISL II	Reg. Season Record 135-110; Reg. Season Win % = .551	Playoff Record 6-6; Playoff Win % = .500
