= 2000–01 National Professional Soccer League season =

National Professional Soccer League
- Season: 2000–01
- Champions: Milwaukee Wave (3rd title)
- Matches: 205
- Top goalscorer: Denison Cabral (69)
- Average attendance: 4,888

The 2000–01 National Professional Soccer League season was the seventeenth and final season for the league.

== League standings ==
=== American Conference ===
Pos	Team	Pld	W	L	GF	GA	GD	PCT	GB
1	Harrisburg Heat	40	24	16	556	552	+4	.600	—
2	Buffalo Blizzard	40	22	18	513	484	+29	.550	2
3	Baltimore Blast	40	22	18	591	529	+62	.550	2
4	Philadelphia KiXX	40	22	18	542	449	+93	.550	2
5	Cleveland Crunch	40	18	22	542	617	−75	.450	6

Source: RSSSF

=== National Conference ===
Pos	Team	Pld	W	L	GF	GA	GD	PCT	GB
1	Milwaukee Wave	40	24	16	544	452	+92	.600	—
2	Toronto ThunderHawks	40	21	19	574	556	+18	.525	3
3	Wichita Wings	39	18	21	516	533	−17	.462	5.5
4	Kansas City Attack	40	14	26	526	637	−111	.350	10
5	Detroit Rockers	40	13	27	469	579	−110	.325	11
6	Edmonton Drillers	9	6	3	135	120	+15	.667	2.5

Source: RSSSF

== Playoffs ==
Conference Semifinals
A1	Harrisburg Heat	19	9	–
A4	Philadelphia KiXX	21	14	–
American Conference
A2	Buffalo Blizzard	8	13	–
A3	Baltimore Blast	9	18	–
N1	Milwaukee Wave	22	2	22
N4	Kansas City Attack	7	12	17
National Conference
N2	Toronto ThunderHawks	14	7	16
N3	Wichita Wings	8	17	12

Conference Finals
A4	Philadelphia KiXX	19	12	16
A3	Baltimore Blast	23	8	15
N1	Milwaukee Wave	18	24	–
N2	Toronto ThunderHawks	14	17	–

Championship
A4	Philadelphia KiXX	12	8	8	–	–
N1	Milwaukee Wave	16	9	10	–	–

== Scoring leaders ==
GP = Games Played, G = Goals, A = Assists, Pts = Points

Player	Team	GP	G	A	Pts
Hector Marinaro	Cleveland	34	63	41	161
Gino DiFlorio	Harrisburg	35	51	48	142
Dino Delevski	Wichita	39	57	15	139
Denison Cabral	Baltimore	35	69	15	134
Joe Reiniger	Milwaukee	29	51	30	134
David Bascome	Harrisburg	40	53	25	128
Domenic Mobilio	Detroit	39	59	20	124
Clovis Simas	Kansas City	37	56	26	120
Bernie Lilavois	Harrisburg	39	44	36	119
Doug Miller	Buffalo	35	47	27	118

== League awards ==
- Most Valuable Player: Gino DiFlorio, Harrisburg
- Defender of the Year: Omid Namazi, Philadelphia
- Rookie of the Year: Nino Da Silva, Kansas City
- Goalkeeper of the Year: Victor Nogueira, Milwaukee & Pete Pappas, Philadelphia
- Coach of the Year: Richard Chinapoo, Harrisburg
- Finals MVP: Joe Reiniger, Milwaukee

== All-NPSL Teams ==
First Team	Position	Second Team	Third Team
Victor Nogueira, Milwaukee	G	Pete Pappas, Philadelphia	Doug Petras, Harrisburg
Glenn Carbonara, Milwaukee	D	Wes Wade, Kansas City	Jason Dieter, Baltimore
Omid Namazi, Philadelphia	D	Droo Callahan, Detroit	John Ball, Cleveland
Gino DiFlorio, Harrisburg	M	Joe Reiniger, Milwaukee	Mauro Biello, Toronto
Hector Marinaro, Cleveland	F	Denison Cabral, Baltimore	Domenic Mobilio, Detroit
David Bascome, Harrisburg	F	Dino Delevski, Wichita	Bernie Lilavois, Harrisburg

=== All-Rookie Team ===
Player	Position	Team
Nino Da Silva	F	Kansas City
Gabriel Gervais	F	Toronto
Greg Howes	M	Milwaukee
Alex Zotincă	D	Kansas City
Chris Morman	D	Harrisburg
Theo Zagar	GK	Toronto
