= 1990–91 Major Soccer League season =

Major Soccer League
- Season: 1990–91
- Champions: San Diego Sockers (7th title)
- Matches: 208
- Goals: 2,277 (10.95 per match)
- Top goalscorer: (Brazil) Tatu (78 goals)
- Average attendance: 6,600

The 1990–91 Major Soccer League season was the 13th and penultimate in league history and would end with the San Diego Sockers winning their ninth NASL or MISL title in ten indoor seasons and fourth MISL title in a row.

== Recap ==
This was the first offseason in MISL history that did not have any franchise movement or collapse. After the season, however, the Kansas City Comets folded. In a nod to the burgeoning nationwide interest in outdoor soccer after the 1990 World Cup, the league's name was changed on July 24. Also, Commissioner Earl Foreman was selected to chair the United States Soccer Federation's exploratory committee for a first-division outdoor league.

== Teams ==
Team	City/Area	Arena
Baltimore Blast	Baltimore, Maryland	Baltimore Arena
Cleveland Crunch	Cleveland, Ohio	Richfield Coliseum
Dallas Sidekicks	Dallas, Texas	Reunion Arena
Kansas City Comets	Kansas City, Missouri	Kemper Arena
San Diego Sockers	San Diego, California	San Diego Sports Arena
St. Louis Storm	St. Louis, Missouri	St. Louis Arena
Tacoma Stars	Tacoma, Washington	Tacoma Dome
Wichita Wings	Wichita, Kansas	Kansas Coliseum

== Map of clubs ==
Eastern Division Western Division

== Regular Season Schedule ==
The 1990–91 regular season schedule ran from October 19, 1990, to April 7, 1991. The 52 games per team was unchanged from the 1989–90 schedule.

== Final standings ==
Playoff teams in bold.

Eastern Division	W	L	Pct.	GB	GF	GA	Home	Road
**Cleveland Crunch**	29	23	.558	--	326	280	20-6	9-17
**Kansas City Comets**	26	26	.500	3	263	283	17-9	9-17
**Wichita Wings**	21	31	.408	8	257	308	17-9	4-22
Baltimore Blast	21	31	.408	8	298	315	15-11	6-20

Western Division	W	L	Pct.	GB	GF	GA	Home	Road
**San Diego Sockers**	34	18	.654	--	302	250	20-6	14-12
**St. Louis Storm**	32	20	.615	2	320	288	20-6	12-14
**Tacoma Stars**	25	27	.481	9	254	259	17-9	8-18
Dallas Sidekicks	20	32	.385	14	257	294	11-15	9-17

== Playoffs ==
Division Semifinals
E2	Kansas City Comets	2
E3	Wichita Wings	0
W2	St. Louis Storm	2
W3	Tacoma Stars	0

Division Finals
E1	Cleveland Crunch	4
E2	Kansas City Comets	3
W1	San Diego Sockers	4
W2	St. Louis Storm	1

Championship Series
E1	Cleveland Crunch	2
W1	San Diego Sockers	4

=== Division Semifinals ===
Kansas City vs. Wichita
Date	Away	Home	Attendance
April 12	Wichita 0	**Kansas City 6**	6,144
April 14	**Kansas City 9**	Wichita 8	4,737
**Kansas City wins series 2-0**

St. Louis vs. Tacoma
Date	Away	Home	Attendance
April 9	Tacoma 2	**St. Louis 9**	5,832
April 11	St. Louis 3	**Tacoma 4**	2,760
	Gary Heale scored at 1:30 of overtime
April 13	Tacoma 2	**St. Louis 9**	7,084
**St. Louis wins series 2-1**

=== Division Finals ===
Cleveland vs. Kansas City
Date	Away	Home	Attendance
April 18	Kansas City 2	**Cleveland 7**	5,357
April 20	Kansas City 5	**Cleveland 7**	10,021
April 24	Cleveland 6	**Kansas City 7**	4,639
	Carl Valentine scored at 11:26 of overtime
April 26	**Cleveland 5**	Kansas City 4	9,451
April 28	Cleveland 4	**Kansas City 5**	3,889
	Ted Eck scored at 4:27 of overtime
May 1	**Kansas City 8**	Cleveland 6	7,239
May 4	Kansas City 6	**Cleveland 7**	12,718
**Cleveland wins series 4-3**

San Diego vs. St. Louis
Date	Away	Home	Attendance
April 18	St. Louis 6	**San Diego 9**	5,157
April 20	St. Louis 4	**San Diego 5**	8,534
	Rod Castro scored at 3:58 of overtime
April 21	San Diego 4	**St. Louis 5**	5,751
April 25	**San Diego 11**	St. Louis 4	4,633
April 27	**San Diego 7**	St. Louis 4	6,032
**San Diego wins series 4-1**

=== Championship Series ===
San Diego vs. Cleveland
Date	Away	Home	Attendance
May 10	Cleveland 4	**San Diego 8**	7,785
May 12	**Cleveland 4**	San Diego 3	6,996
May 17	**San Diego 6**	Cleveland 5	14,571
May 19	San Diego 5	**Cleveland 7**	10,831
May 21	**San Diego 6**	Cleveland 1	12,102
May 23	Cleveland 6	**San Diego 8**	12,073
**San Diego wins series 4-2**

=== Scoring leaders ===
GP = Games Played, G = Goals, A = Assists, Pts = Points

Player	Team	GP	G	A	Pts
(Brazil) Tatu	Dallas Sidekicks	51	78	66	144
(Socialist Federal Republic of Yugoslavia) Zoran Karic	Cleveland Crunch	47	73	48	121
(United States) Preki	St Louis Storm	52	68	53	121
(Netherlands) Jan Goossens	Kansas City Comets	41	53	58	111
(Canada) Hector Marinaro	Cleveland Crunch	45	63	44	107
(Nigeria) Thompson Usiyan	St Louis Storm	51	64	38	102
(United States) Dale Ervine	Wichita Wings	52	62	30	92
(Canada) Dale Mitchell	Baltimore Blast	51	42	40	82
(Canada) Domenic Mobilio	Baltimore Blast	50	49	33	82
(United States) Brian Quinn	San Diego Sockers	45	19	55	74

== All-MISL Teams ==
First Team	Position	Second Team
(United States) Victor Nogueira, San Diego	G	(Puerto Rico) Cris Vaccaro, Tacoma
(United States) Kevin Crow, San Diego	D	(United States) Bernie James, Cleveland
(United States) Fernando Clavijo, St Louis	D	(Scotland) Ralph Black, Tacoma
(Socialist Federal Republic of Yugoslavia) Zoran Karic, Cleveland	M	(United States) Brian Quinn, San Diego
(Brazil) Tatu, Dallas	F	(Nigeria) Thompson Usiyan, St Louis
(United States) Preki, St Louis	F	(Denmark) Jan Goossens, Kansas City

== League awards ==
Most Valuable Player: (United States) Victor Nogueira, San Diego

Scoring Champion: (Brazil) Tatu, Dallas

Pass Master: (Brazil) Tatu, Dallas

Defender of the Year: (United States) Kevin Crow, San Diego

Rookie of the Year: (England) David Banks, San Diego

Newcomer of the Year: (Canada) Paul Peschisolido, Kansas City

Goalkeeper of the Year: (United States) Victor Nogueira, San Diego

Coach of the Year: (England) Trevor Dawkins, Cleveland

Championship Series Most Valuable Player: (Liberia) Ben Collins, San Diego

Championship Series Unsung Hero: (United States) Glenn Carbonara, San Diego

== Team Attendance Totals ==
Club	Games	Total	Average
St. Louis Storm	26	200,769	7,722
Baltimore Blast	26	193,223	7,432
San Diego Sockers	26	187,000	7,192
Kansas City Comets	26	184,678	7,103
Dallas Sidekicks	26	179,864	6,918
Wichita Wings	26	164,033	6,309
Tacoma Stars	26	142,523	5,482
Cleveland Crunch	26	120,630	4,640
**OVERALL**	**208**	**1,372,720**	**6,600**
