= Rob Marinaro =

Canadian soccer player (born 1969)

Personal information
- Full name: Rob Marinaro
- Date of birth: November 6, 1969 (age 56)
- Place of birth: Toronto, Ontario, Canada
- Height: 5 ft 10 in (1.78 m)
- Position: Goalkeeper

Youth career
- 1987–1991: Clemson University

Senior career*
Years	Team	Apps	(Gls)
1992–1993	Cleveland Crunch (indoor)	0	(0)
1993	Toronto Blizzard	1	(0)
1993–1994	Chicago Power (indoor)	18	(0)
1994–1996	Buffalo Blizzard (indoor)	25	(0)
1996	Harrisburg Heat (indoor)	7	(0)
1996–1997	Cleveland Crunch (indoor)	19	(0)

Managerial career
- 1997–2000: Kent State University (assistant)
- 2001–: Kent State
- * Club domestic league appearances and goals

Rob Marinaro (born November 6, 1969) is a retired Canadian soccer goalkeeper who currently coaches the Kent State University women's soccer team. He spent five seasons in the National Professional Soccer League.

== Player ==
Marinaro, son of Hector Marinaro, Sr. and brother of Hector Marinaro, grew up playing soccer under the tutelage of his father. Marinaro attended Clemson University where he played on the men's soccer team from 1987 to 1992. He was part of the Clemson team which won the 1987 NCAA championship. He graduated in 1992 with a bachelor's degree in language and international trade. The Cleveland Crunch of the indoor Major Soccer League drafted Marinaro in the fourth round of the 1992 Amateur Draft. However, he never played for the Crunch as they traded him to the Chicago Power of the National Professional Soccer League (NPSL). In the summer of 1993, Marinaro played one game with the Toronto Blizzard of the American Professional Soccer League. He then joined the Power for the 1993–1994 season, being named to the All-Rookie Team and finishing as runner up for Rookie of the Year. In 1994, he moved to the Buffalo Blizzard for two seasons. While he saw time in twenty games in 1994–1995, he played only five games before being traded to the Harrisburg Heat. He played seven games to finish out the 1995–1996 season. He moved to the Cleveland Crunch for the 1996–1997 season, signing a three-year contract, along with his brother, on September 30, 1996. He played only one season, announcing his retirement on July 27, 1997.

He continues to play at a semi-professional level with the Cleveland Legends indoor team in the National Soccer League.

== Coaching ==
Marinaro began coaching at summer camps in 1995 and 1996. After his retirement from professional soccer, he was hired by Kent State University as an assistant coach with the women's soccer team. On January 2, 2001, he became the head coach, replacing Colleen Marcum. He is a two time Mid-American Conference coach of the year (2003 and 2004). In addition to his collegiate coaching duties, Marinaro has coaches in the Olympic Development Program (ODP) and is the director of coaching for the Stow Soccer Club.
