= Travis Roy (soccer) =

American soccer player (born 1974)

Personal information
- Date of birth: May 10, 1974 (age 52)
- Place of birth: Detroit, Michigan, U.S.
- Height: 6 ft 0 in (1.83 m)
- Positions: Midfielder; forward

College career
Years	Team	Apps	(Gls)
1992–1995	Wisconsin Badgers		

Senior career*
Years	Team	Apps	(Gls)
1996–1997	Milwaukee Rampage		(13)
1997–1999	Detroit Rockers (indoor)	67	(33)
1998	MetroStars	0	(0)
1998	→ Staten Island Vipers (loan)	1	(1)
1998	Milwaukee Rampage	14	(3)
1999	St. Louis Ambush (indoor)	5	(6)
2000–2001	Buffalo Blizzard (indoor)	20	(10)
- * Club domestic league appearances and goals

Travis Roy (born May 10, 1974) is an American retired soccer player who played professionally in the United States Interregional Soccer League and National Professional Soccer League. He was the 1998 NPSL Rookie of the Year.

== Youth ==
Born in Detroit, Roy grew up in Livonia, Michigan. He graduated from Stevenson High School where he played on the Michigan State High School soccer championship team. He attended the University of Wisconsin-Madison, playing on the men's soccer team from 1992 to 1995. The Badgers won the 1995 NCAA Men's Division I Soccer Championship. Roy graduated with a double degree in history and political science.

== Professional ==
The Milwaukee Wave selected Roy in the Territorial Round of the 1995 National Professional Soccer League Amateur Draft, but Roy did not sign with the team. On April 15, 1996, he signed with the Milwaukee Rampage of the USISL. In 1997, Roy and his teammates won the USISL A-League championship. In the fall of 1997, Roy moved indoors with the Detroit Rockers of the NPSL where he was named the 1997–1998 Rookie of the Year. On February 1, 1998, the MetroStars selected Roy in the second round (fourteenth overall) of the 1998 MLS Supplemental Draft. The MetroStars sent him on loan to the Staten Island Vipers at the end of May before waiving him the first week of June. He rejoined the Rampage on July 11, 1998, for the 1998 outdoor season before moving indoors with the Rockers for the 1998–1999 NPSL season. On March 20, 1999, the Rockers traded Roy and Mariano Bollella to the St. Louis Ambush for Lee Tschantret. In September 2000, Roy signed with the Buffalo Blizzard. The Blizzard folded at the end of the season and on August 20, 2001, the Cleveland Crunch selected Roy in the sixth round (thirty-second) overall of the MISL Dispersal Draft. He did not sign with the Crunch.
