= Hector Marinaro =

Hector Marinaro may refer to:

- Hector Marinaro (footballer, 1931-2017), Argentine football coach and former centre-back
- Hector Marinaro (soccer, born 1964), Canadian soccer coach and former forward, son of above footballer
