= Cincinnati Silverbacks =

Indoor soccer club in Ohio, U.S.

- Full name: Cincinnati Silverbacks
- Nickname: Silverbacks
- Founded: 1995
- Dissolved: 1998
- Ground: The Crown
- Chairman: Rich Neumann
- Head Coach: Georger Fernandez
- League: NPSL

The Cincinnati Silverbacks were an indoor soccer club based in Cincinnati, Ohio, that competed in the National Professional Soccer League.

== History ==
They performed under the leadership of All-Star goalkeeper Carlos Pena. Other star players included Gino DiFlorio (who scored a team record 10 points in his Silverback debut against rival Cleveland Crunch), Franklin McIntosh, Shawn Medved, and Dennis Brose. Games were held at the Cincinnati Gardens for their first two seasons before moving downtown along with the Cincinnati Cyclones where they would compete at The Crown (now known as Heritage Bank Center) for their final year of competition.

Despite their performance and fan support, the Silverbacks were discontinued due to not generating revenue. The Detroit-based Nederlander Organization, which manages Riverbend and the Taft Theater in Cincinnati as well as the Crown, was a partner in Cincinnati Entertainment Associates Ltd., which owned the Crown, Cyclones and Silverbacks. Former President Rich Neumann said a contributing factor to the club's demise was a lack of weekend home dates. Of the 20 home games played in an average season, the Silverbacks would need at least 15 to be on a Friday or Saturday night. In their final season, 13 games were played on Friday or Saturday. Roughly 75 percent of Silverbacks ticket sales come from groups, with less than 10 percent—believed to be around 100—season ticket holders.

The team was previously known as the Dayton Dynamo, from 1987/88-1994/95.

== Year-by-year ==
Year	GP	W	L	%	GB	GF	GA	League	Avg. attendance	Division	Playoffs
1995–96	40	14	26	.350	17	496	579	NPSL	3,759	5th, American	DNQ
1996–97	40	21	19	.525	8	570	517	NPSL	3,173	2nd, American Central	Conference Semifinals
1997–98	40	15	25	.375	13	563	604	NPSL	5,145	3rd, American Central	Conference Quarterfinals

== 1995–96: The Inaugural Season ==
=== Roster ===
Note: Flags indicate national team as defined under FIFA eligibility rules; some limited exceptions apply. Players may hold more than one non-FIFA nationality.

No.	Pos.	Nation	Player
0	GK	USA	Mark Simpson
01	GK	USA	John Mers
1	GK	USA	Carlos Pena
2	DF	USA	Jeff Popp
3	FW	USA	Jason Maricle
5	FW	USA	Scott Lawler
5	DF	USA	Scott Cannon
7	DF	SCO	Vince Beck
8	MF	USA	Chris King
9	FW	USA	Jimmy Glenn
10	DF	USA	Mike Gosselin
11	FW	USA	Dennis Brose
14	MF	USA	Chris Pfau
20	MF	USA	Doug Tegge
22	DF	USA	Willy Merrick

No.	Pos.	Nation	Player
25	MF	USA	Tony Bono
—		USA	Jeff Alcala
—		RSA	Michael Araujo
—	FW		Terry Brown
—	DF	USA	Chuck Codd
—	FW	USA	Dan Creech
—	FW	USA	George Fernandez
11	FW	USA	Jim Foley (soccer)
—	MF	GUY	Lyndon Hooper
—	DF	USA	Paul McDonnell
—	DF	USA	Matt Kmosko
—	FW	USA	Bernie Lilavois
—	FW	USA	Shawn Medved
—	MF	USA	Steve Provan
—			Mark Thomas
—	MF	MEX	Armando Valdivia
