= Harrisburg Heat =

Harrisburg Heat may refer to:

- Harrisburg Heat (1991–2003), an indoor soccer team that was part of the Major Indoor Soccer League
- Harrisburg Heat (2012–), a professional indoor soccer team that is part of the Major Arena Soccer League
