= St. Louis Ambush =

St. Louis Ambush may refer to:

- St. Louis Ambush (1992–2000), former indoor soccer team that played from 1992-2000.
- St. Louis Ambush (2013–), indoor soccer team founded in 2013, currently a member of the Major Arena Soccer League
