= Trey Harrington =

American soccer player (born 1970)

Personal information
- Date of birth: November 26, 1970 (age 55)
- Place of birth: Cheyenne, Wyoming, U.S.
- Height: 6 ft 2 in (1.88 m)
- Position: Goalkeeper

College career
Years	Team	Apps	(Gls)
1989–1992	Evansville Purple Aces		

Senior career*
Years	Team	Apps	(Gls)
1994	Wichita Wings (indoor)	20	(0)
1995	Detroit Rockers (indoor)	4	(0)
1997	Colorado Foxes	14	(0)
Total		38	(0)

International career
1992	United States U23		
- * Club domestic league appearances and goals

Trey Harrington (born November 26, 1970) is an American former soccer player who played for the Colorado Foxes in the A-League.

== Career statistics ==
=== Club ===
Club	Season	League			Cup		Continental		Other		Total	
Club	Season	Division	Apps	Goals	Apps	Goals	Apps	Goals	Apps	Goals	Apps	Goals
Wichita Wings	1994–95	NPSL	20	0	0	0	–		0	0	20	0
Detroit Rockers	1994–95	NPSL	4	0	0	0	–		0	0	4	0
Colorado Foxes	1997	USISL A-League	14	0	0	0	–		0	0	14	0
Career total			38	0	0	0	0	0	0	0	38	0
