= Héctor Marinaro (footballer, born 1931) =

Argentine footballer and manager

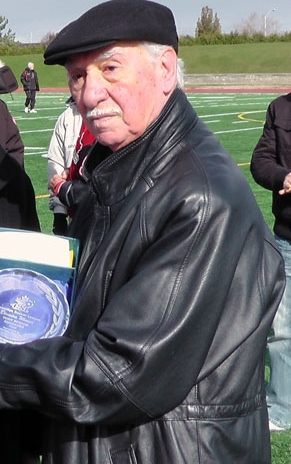
- Marinaro in 2010

Personal information
- Full name: Héctor Leonardo Marinaro
- Date of birth: 23 July 1931
- Place of birth: Buenos Aires, Argentina
- Date of death: 30 January 2017 (aged 85)
- Place of death: Newmarket, Ontario, Canada
- Position: Central defender

Senior career*
Years	Team	Apps	(Gls)
1947–1953	Racing Club		
1953–1957	Almagro		
1957–1963	CD FAS		
1961	→ Montreal Concordia (loan)		
1962	Tampico (loan)		
1963–1965	Toronto Italia		

Managerial career
- 1962: Tampico (assistant)
- 1966: Toronto Italia
- 1967–1968: Toronto Falcons (assistant)
- 1973: Toronto Italia
- 1976–: Toronto Italia
- 1986–1991: Toronto Blizzard
- 1994: Toronto Rockets
- * Club domestic league appearances and goals

Héctor Leonardo Marinaro Sr. (23 July 1931 – 30 January 2017) was an Argentine football player and coach. A central defender, he played professionally in Argentina, El Salvador, Mexico and Canada before becoming a coach and general manager for several indoor and outdoor professional teams in the Toronto area.

== Player ==
Marinaro began his professional career with Racing Club of the Argentine first division when he was sixteen years old. Six years later, he transferred to second division club Almagro. Four years later, at age 26, he moved to El Salvador club CD FAS. He spent five seasons in El Salvador, winning three championships (1959, 1962 and 1963). In 1961, he spent the summer playing on loan with Montreal Concordia in the Québec National Soccer League. Concordia won the league championship and Marinaro was named the league MVP, but had to return to El Salvador immediately after the championship game and before the awards presentation. In 2006, he was finally awarded the trophy which had disappeared for over twenty years. In addition to playing in the NSL, Concordia also entered the International Soccer League. In 1962, he played on loan with Mexican club Tampico. In 1963, Marinaro left El Salvador and moved to Canada permanently. That year, he joined Toronto Italia of the Eastern Canada Professional Soccer League.

== Coaching ==
Marinaro began coaching in 1962, when he was an assistant coach, as well as player, with Tampico. In 1966, Marinaro began the head coach of Toronto Italia. In 1967, he became an assistant coach with the Toronto Falcons of the National Professional Soccer League. The Falcons then entered the North American Soccer League in 1968, but folded at the end of the season. In 1973, he returned to coach Toronto Italia in the National Soccer League.

In 1971, he joined the Ontario Soccer Association as a staff coach. He held that position until 1976 when he became the coach of the Toronto Italia. In 1986, he has hired as the head coach of the Toronto Blizzard of the Canadian Soccer League (CSL). He coached the team through the 1991 season, then moved to the Toronto Rockets in August 1994 where he became the general manager and replaced Peter Felicetti as head coach. In 1996, he served as the general manager for the Toronto Shooting Stars of the National Professional Soccer League. In 2000, he became the general manager of the expansion Brampton Hitmen of the Canadian Soccer League. That fall, he joined the management team for the Toronto ThunderHawks of the NPSL. The ThunderHawks folded after one season.

== Personal ==
Marinaro continued to live in Canada. His sons, Héctor and Rob both played professionally and currently coach collegiate soccer in the United States. He died on 30 January 2017.
