= Gino DiFlorio =

Italian soccer player

Personal information
- Date of birth: 18 September 1964 (age 62)
- Place of birth: Naples, Italy
- Height: 5 ft 9 in (1.75 m)
- Position: Midfielder

Senior career*
Years	Team	Apps	(Gls)
1983	Toronto Italia		
1984–1987	Cleveland Force (indoor)	128	(56)
1987–1988	Dayton Dynamo (indoor)	26	(25)
1988	Toronto Blizzard	23	(7)
1988–1989	Dallas Sidekicks (indoor)	4	(0)
1989–1991	Canton Invaders (indoor)	74	(94)
1991–1992	Cleveland Crunch (indoor)	28	(15)
1991–1992	Toronto Blizzard	40	(10)
1992–1994	Canton Invaders (indoor)	74	(148)
1994	Toronto Rockets		
1994–1997	Buffalo Blizzard (indoor)	72	(99)
1997–1998	Cincinnati Silverbacks (indoor)	40	(67)
1998	Cincinnati Riverhawks	23	(12)
1998–2002	Harrisburg Heat (indoor)	125	(179)
1999	Hershey Wildcats	24	(9)
2000	Connecticut Wolves	7	(0)
2002–2003	Baltimore Blast (indoor)	16	(7)

International career
1988	Canada	1	(0)
- * Club domestic league appearances and goals

Gino DiFlorio (born 1964) is a Canadian former professional soccer player who had an extensive indoor career in North America during the 1990s. Since 2020 he is the Technical Director at the Capital Area Soccer Association (CASA) in Harrisburg, Pennsylvania. From 2001 to 2020, he was the director of coaching at the youth soccer club in Eastern Pennsylvania called HMMS.

== Player ==
=== Youth ===
At the age of 10 he moved to Canada to be live his Mother having lived with his Grandmother in Italy. Growing up and playing recreational soccer, he could not put the soccer ball away, he was hooked. Sometime in his teen years, Gino was recognized by a coach of one of the Canadian Provincial Teams. He was later put on the roster. Not long after that, he was training with the Canadian Youth Team, in which he started every game, but did not make the final roster. He stopped for a year and threw out all of his gear, and moved back to Italy. About a year later, he came back to Canada and was put back on the provincial teams, as the coaches recognized that they could not let talent like that go un-noticed. After coming out of highschool, Jay Fox put him on the road to his professional career.

=== Professional ===
DiFlorio began his career in 1983 with Toronto Italia in the National Soccer League where he assisted in securing the NSL Cup by defeating Toronto Panhellenic. In the winter of 1984 he played in the original Major Indoor Soccer League, joining the Cleveland Force in 1984 or 1985, a club he remained with until 1987. He then played in 1987-88 for the Dayton Dynamo of the American Indoor Soccer Association and in 1988-89 for the Dallas Sidekicks of MISL. He later played for the Toronto Blizzard.

DiFlorio played 1990-1 for the Canton Invaders of the National Professional Soccer League and finished the season the league's leading scorer. He then played 1991-92 for the Cleveland Crunch of the MISL. He returned to the Invaders for the 1992–93 season and finished the season the league's 3rd leading scorer for the second time. With the Invaders again for 1993–94, he finished the league's 5th leading scorer. DiFlorio then played a summer season of outdoor soccer, 1994, for the Toronto Rockets in the American Professional Soccer League. He then from 1994 to 1997 played for NPSL side Buffalo Blizzard, for the Cincinnati Silverbacks from 1997 to 1998 and then from 1998 to 2002, the Harrisburg Heat. (The Heat played until 2001 in the NPSL and then belonged to the Major Indoor Soccer League.) DiFlorio began the 2002–2003 season with the Heat, but finished his career with the Baltimore Blast, for whom he played the end of the season. He was the (AISA-)NPSL's 3rd all-time leading scorer with 1,452 points and second all-time goal scorer with 559.

=== International ===
DiFlorio had one cap for the Canadian national soccer team, which came in 1988 on 15 July in a friendly against Poland played in Toronto. Canada lost 1–2. This appearance kept him from playing for the U.S. National team after becoming a U.S. Citizen.

== Coach ==
The Harrisburg Heat of the Professional Arena Soccer League, where DiFlorio is the assistant coach, retired his number in a halftime ceremony during the 15 December 2012, game.

DiFlorio also trains and coaches players for HMMS Soccer Club and serves as director of coaching for the club.
