= George Fernandez =

American soccer player-coach

Personal information
- Date of birth: October 29, 1961 (age 65)
- Place of birth: San Francisco, California, U.S.
- Height: 5 ft 9 in (1.75 m)
- Position: Defender

Youth career
- 1979–1983: Cal State Hayward

Senior career*
Years	Team	Apps	(Gls)
1983–1985	Cleveland Force (indoor)	6	(0)
1985–1987	Los Angeles Lazers (indoor)	64	(8)
1987–1990	San Diego Sockers (indoor)	145	(13)
1990–1994	Cleveland Crunch (indoor)	154	(38)
1995–1998	Cincinnati Silverbacks (indoor)	91	(13)
Total		460	(72)

International career
- US U-20
- US Futsal

Managerial career
- 1994–1995: Anaheim Splash
- 1996–1998: Cincinnati Silverbacks
- 1998–2000: Buffalo Blizzard
- 2000–2001: Cleveland Crunch (assistant)
- 2001: Cleveland Crunch (interim)
- * Club domestic league appearances and goals

George Fernandez is an American retired soccer defender who played professionally in the Major Indoor Soccer League and National Professional Soccer League. He coached in both the Continental Indoor Soccer League and NPSL and was the 1994 CISL Coach of the Year.

== Playing career ==
=== Youth ===
Born in San Francisco, Fernandez spent much of his youth in Hawaii. He played both soccer and football in high school and was offered a football scholarship by the University of the Pacific but chose to attend Cal State Hayward instead. Fernandez played soccer at Hayward from 1979 to 1983. He was a 1982 and 1983 NCAA Division II First Team All American and has been inducted into the CSU East Bay Athletic Hall of Fame.

=== Professional ===
In 1983, the Chicago Sting of the North American Soccer League drafted Fernandez but he did not sign with them. In October 1983, the Tacoma Stars had the first selection in the Major Indoor Soccer League Draft but swapped their pick with the Cleveland Force. The Force used the pick to select Fernandez. Fernandez played only six games over two seasons with the Force before being released in October 1985. On December 27, 1985, the Los Angeles Lazers for the remainder of the season. He ended up playing two seasons in Los Angeles. In 1987, Fernandez joined the San Diego Sockers as a free agent. On July 30, 1990, he moved to the Cleveland Crunch as a free agent. In 1992, the Crunch moved to the National Professional Soccer League. In 1994, he became the head coach of the Anaheim Splash in the Continental Indoor Soccer League. NPSL rules prohibited players and coaches from the CISL to compete in the NPSL. Therefore, the Crunch released Fernandez. In 1995, he returned to the NPSL when he signed with the Cincinnati Silverbacks.

=== National team ===
In 1981, he played two games with the United States U-20 men's national soccer team at the 1981 FIFA World Youth Championship. He was a member of the United States national futsal team at both the 1992 and 1996 FIFA Futsal World Championship.

== Coaching career ==
In 1994, Fernandez became the head coach of the Anaheim Splash of the Continental Indoor Soccer League. He took the team, to the second best record in the league and was named the 1994 CISL Coach of the Year. In September 1996, Fernandez became a player-coach with the Cincinnati Silverbacks. He coached the Silverbacks for two seasons. In September 1998, the Buffalo Blizzard hired Fernandez. The team fired him on March 1, 2000. He then moved to the Cleveland Crunch as an assistant coach. When the Crunch fired head coach Bruce Miller in March 2001, Fernandez served as interim head coach for the remainder of the season.

== Yearly Awards ==
- CISL Coach of the Year – 1994
