= St. Louis Ambush (1992–2000) =

- Founded: 1991
- Dissolved: 2000
- Ground: St. Louis Arena (17,188); Kiel Center (19,150)
- Owners: Dr. Abraham Hawatmeh; Dr. Richard Rende
- League: NPSL

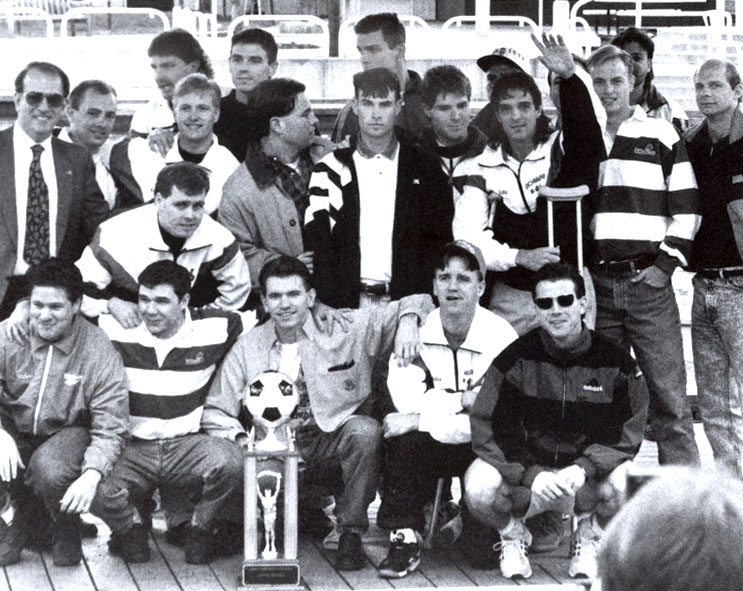
1994–95 NPSL Champions.

The St. Louis Ambush was a professional indoor soccer team based in St. Louis, Missouri. Before they moved to St. Louis they were known as the Tulsa Ambush.

== History ==
The Ambush were founded in Tulsa, Oklahoma: the team played one season at Tulsa's Expo Square Pavilion. Vernon Riggs was the general manager. Keith Dial was the managing general partner. Former Tulsa Roughneck and Major Indoor Soccer League player Victor Moreland was signed to be the player/coach.

The Wichita-based ownership group had hoped to buy a Wichita NPSL franchise but moved forward with the team in Tulsa when the Wings remained in the MISL for the 1991–1992 season. When the Wings did join the NPSL for the 1992–93 season after the MISL folded with two other MISL teams (Cleveland and Baltimore) and after searching for Tulsa owners, the team was sold to St. Louis physicians Dr. Abraham Hawatmeh and Dr. Richard Rende in the summer of 1992. Hawatmeh and Rende moved the franchise to St. Louis and played first in the St. Louis Arena, then the Kiel Center.

The Ambush made the playoffs every year that they played in St. Louis, except their final year of 1999–2000. The Ambush won one National Professional Soccer League championship (1994–1995 season), and played in four NPSL Championship series (1994, 1995, 1998, 1999), losing to the Cleveland Crunch twice (in 1994 and 1999), and to the Milwaukee Wave (1998), but defeated the Harrisburg Heat in 1995 for their lone NPSL title.

In 2013, an expansion team in the third Major Indoor Soccer League was named after this franchise. That team became a member of the Major Arena Soccer League after the MISL collapsed.

== Year-by-year ==
Year	League	Record	Reg. season	Playoffs
1991–92	NPSL	7–33	5th, National	Did not qualify
1992–93	NPSL	19–21	4th, National	Lost Semifinals (Kansas City)
1993–94	NPSL	25–15	1st, National	Lost Finals (Cleveland)
1994–95	NPSL	30–10	1st, National	NPSL Champions
1995–96	NPSL	24–16	3rd, National	Lost Div. Finals (Kansas City)
1996–97	NPSL	27–13	1st, Midwest	Lost Conf. Finals (Kansas City)
1997–98	NPSL	27–13	1st, Midwest	Lost Finals (Milwaukee)
1998–99	NPSL	21–19	1st, Midwest	Lost Finals (Cleveland)
1999–2000	NPSL	11–33	3rd, Midwest	Did not qualify

== Coaches ==
- (Northern Ireland) Victor Moreland (1991–1992)
- (United States) Steve Pecher (1992–1993)
- (United States) Daryl Doran (1993–1999)
- (United States) Jamie Swanner (1999–2000)
- (United States) Joe Reiniger (2000)
- (Chile) Jorge Espinoza (2000)
