= Matt Knowles (soccer) =

American soccer player-coach (born 1970)

Personal information
- Full name: Matt Knowles
- Date of birth: October 7, 1970 (age 56)
- Place of birth: Philadelphia, Pennsylvania, United States
- Height: 6 ft 1 in (1.85 m)
- Position: Defender

Senior career*
| Years | Team | Apps | (Gls) |
| 1990–1991 | Penn-Jersey Spirit | | |
| 1990–1992 | Illinois Thunder (indoor) | 79 | (68) |
| 1992 | Fort Lauderdale Strikers | 3 | (0) |
| 1992–1993 | Denver Thunder (indoor) | 3 | (3) |
| 1993–1996 | Milwaukee Wave (indoor) | 116 | (109) |
| 1993 | Tampa Bay Rowdies | 9 | (0) |
| 1996–1997 | Cleveland Crunch (indoor) | 14 | (12) |
| 1996–1998 | MetroStars | 32 | (0) |
| 1997–1999 | Philadelphia KiXX (indoor) | 75 | (90) |
| 1998 | Miami Fusion | 3 | (0) |
| 1998 | → Staten Island Vipers (loan) | 1 | (0) |
| 1999–2001 | Detroit Rockers (indoor) | 57 | (29) |
| 2001–2002 | Harrisburg Heat (indoor) | 35 | (22) |
| 2002 | Carolina Dynamo | 3 | (0) |
| 2002 | Kansas City Comets (indoor) | 0 | (0) |
| 2002–2003 | Philadelphia KiXX (indoor) | 4 | (1) |
- * Club domestic league appearances and goals

Matt Knowles (born October 7, 1970) is a former U.S. soccer defender who spent most of his career playing indoor soccer. However, he also spent time in the American Professional Soccer League in the early 1990s and Major League Soccer.

== APSL ==
Knowles grew up in Philadelphia and attended Archbishop Ryan High School from 1985 to 1988. Most sources state that Knowles turned professional immediately after high school. Knowles went on to play at Wake Forest University but left after 2 seasons and turned pro. he signed with the Penn-Jersey Spirit of the American Professional Soccer League (APSL). In 1991, Knowles played nineteen games with the Spirit, scoring one goal. The Spirit folded at the end of the 1991 season and Knowles moved to the Fort Lauderdale Strikers for the 1992 APSL season. While he was an integral part of the Spirit, Knowles saw time in only three games with the Strikers. In 1993, he moved to the Tampa Bay Rowdies where his playing time increased to nine games. In 1997 Knowles signed with Philadelphia Kixx and making it the highest contracted in the indoor game at 130,000 per season. He played both indoor and outdoor for the next 8 seasons.

== NPSL ==
In 1990, Knowles signed with the expansion Illinois Thunder of the National Professional Soccer League (NPSL) He spent two seasons with Illinois, earning NPSL Defender of the Year honors for the 1991–1992 season. That season, he scored forty-five goals in forty games as a defender. In addition to his Defender of the Year Award, Knowles was selected to the first team All NPSL team. The Thunder moved to Denver at the end of the 1991–1992 season, and Knowles played three games there before being traded to the Milwaukee Wave. In the fall of 1993, he tore the anterior cruciate ligament in his right knee. The injury put him out of all but five games of the 1993–1994 season. He bounced back the next season, gaining ninety-four points, making him the second highest scorer on the Wave. He continued his excellent play in the 1995–1996 season, earning his second Defender of the Year title and first team All NPSL recognition while racking up 123 points on 47 goals and 36 assists.

His indoor success brought him to the attention of Major League Soccer (MLS) as that league was beginning operations in 1996. In February 1996, the MetroStars selected Knowles in the first round (ninth overall) in the league's Inaugural Player Draft. While Knowles signed with the MetroStars, he continued to play indoor soccer during the MLS off-season.

While Knowles experienced considerable success with the Wave, he had frequent disagreements with the Wave's ownership. This led to his expressing a desire to be traded. On December 26, 1996, the Wave acquiesced to Knowles desires and traded him to the Cleveland Crunch for Glenn Carbonara, Todd Dusosky, Obi Moneme and cash. He was injured while in Cleveland and saw little playing time. On July 29, 1997, Knowles bought out the remaining three years of his contract with the Crunch and signed as a free agent with the Philadelphia KiXX. In the 1997–1998 season, his first in Philadelphia, Knowles experienced a resurgence which led to his third Defender of the Year award. After one more season with the KiXX, Knowles moved to the Detroit Rockers. Knowles played two seasons in Detroit before the Rockers folded at the end of the 2000–2001 season.

In 2001, the Harrisburg Heat picked up Knowles in the dispersal draft. That year, the NPSL disbanded and the surviving NPSL franchises created a new league, the Major Indoor Soccer League (MISL). At some time in 2002, Knowles moved from the Heat to the Kansas City Comets. On October 2, 2002, the Comets traded Knowles to the Philadelphia KiXX in exchange for Matt Caution. However, Knowles again experienced a considerable number of injuries and spent most of the season on the injured-reserved list.

== MLS ==
Following his being drafted by the MetroStars in February 1996, Knowles spent two and a half seasons with the team. While he played nearly every game of the 1996 season, he was injured during the 1996-1997 NPSL season. This led to his sporadic playing time with the MetroStars during the 1997 and 1998 seasons. On July 1, 1998, traded to the expansion Miami Fusion for a third round College Draft pick. He played out the remainder of the 1998 seasons with the Fusion, but played in only three games. The Fusion also sent him on loan to the Staten Island Vipers for one game. At the end of the 1998 season, Knowles left outdoor soccer to concentrate on his more successful indoor career.
