= Goran Hunjak =

Croatian-American soccer player (born 1965)

Personal information
- Date of birth: 13 November 1965
- Place of birth: Zagreb, Yugoslavia
- Height: 5 ft 9 in (1.75 m)
- Position: Midfielder

Senior career*
Years	Team	Apps	(Gls)
1983–1988	NK Zagreb		
1988–1992	Wichita Wings (indoor)	88	(21)
1992–1994	Baltimore Spirit (indoor)	75	(91)
1994	Washington Warthogs (indoor)	25	(47)
1994–1997	Kansas City Attack (indoor)	118	(177)
1996	Tampa Bay Mutiny	21	(2)
1997	Washington Warthogs (indoor)	21	(18)
1998	Kansas City Wizards	12	(0)
1998	→ MLS Pro 40 (loan)	1	(0)
1998–1999	Kansas City Attack (indoor)	26	(24)
1999–2001	Philadelphia KiXX (indoor)	78	(92)
2000	Vermont Voltage	?	(1)
2001–2005	Kansas City Comets (indoor)	78	(41)
- * Club domestic league appearances and goals

Goran Hunjak (born 13 November 1965 in Yugoslavia) is a retired football player.

== Club career ==
"Scorin" Goran Hunjak began his professional career in 1983 with for NK Zagreb in the Croatian First Division. In 1988, he moved to the United States and signed with the Wichita Wings in Major Indoor Soccer League. In 1992, the league collapsed and Hunjak moved to the Baltimore Spirit in the National Professional Soccer League. In 1994, the expansion Washington Warthogs which played a summer indoor soccer in the Continental Indoor Soccer League made Hunjak its first player when it selected him in the expansion draft. He played one season with Washington where he was a first team All Star, then moved to the Kansas City Attack in the fall of 1994 for three seasons. In January 1996, the Tampa Bay Mutiny drafted Hunjak. He spent the 1996 season in Tampa Bay filling in as the team's play maker when Carlos Valderrama was with the Colombian national team. In spring 1997, he signed with the Washington Warthogs of the Continental Indoor Soccer League. He returned to Major League Soccer after being drafted by the Kansas City Wizards in the first round (eighth overall) of 1998 MLS Supplemental Draft. He returned to the NPSL, rejoining his previous team, the Kansas City Attack for the 1998–1999 season. In 1999, he moved to the Philadelphia KiXX for two seasons before transferring to his final team, the Kansas City Comets in 2001.
