= Bojan Vučković (footballer) =

Serbian footballer (born 1970)

Bo Vučković
Personal information
- Full name: Bojan Vučković
- Date of birth: July 17, 1970 (age 56)
- Place of birth: Belgrade, Yugoslavia
- Height: 5 ft 11 in (1.80 m)
- Position: Forward

Youth career
- 1984–1991: FK Partizan

College career
Years	Team	Apps	(Gls)
1991–1994	Franklin Pierce Ravens		

Senior career*
Years	Team	Apps	(Gls)
1995	Arizona Sandsharks (indoor)	28	(32)
1995–1996	Tampa Bay Terror (indoor)	39	(66)
1996	New England Revolution	1	(0)
1996	New Hampshire Phantoms		(4)
1996	Cape Cod Crusaders		(1)
1996–1998	Baltimore Spirit (indoor)	68	(108)
1997	Rochester Rhinos		
1998	Kansas City Attack (indoor)	6	(11)
1998–1999	Detroit Rockers (indoor)	45	(45)
1999–2014	Vermont Voltage		
1999–2000	Philadelphia KiXX (indoor)	30	(21)
2001	St. Louis Steamers (indoor)	7	(2)

Managerial career
- 2001–2006: Vermont Voltage
- * Club domestic league appearances and goals as of May 21, 2010

Bojan "Bo" Vučković (Serbian Cyrillic: Бојан Вучковић; born July 17, 1970) is a Serbian footballer, who owned and played for the now defunct Vermont Voltage in the USL Premier Development League.

== Career ==
=== Youth and college ===
Vučković grew up in Belgrade, joining FK Partizan as a youth player in 1984. With the onset of unrest in Yugoslavia in the early 1990s, Vučković elected to attend college in the United States and in 1991 entered Franklin Pierce College, playing with the school's Division II NCAA soccer team. He was a 1993 and 1994 second team All-American and finished his four years with the school record in goals (99) and points (246).

=== Professional ===
Following college, Vučković remained in the United States and signed with the Arizona Sandsharks of the Continental Indoor Soccer League (CISL) where he finished runner up to Mark Chung in the Rookie of the Year voting. That fall, he joined the Tampa Bay Terror of the National Professional Soccer League (NPSL) for the 1995–1996 season. He was the ninth leading scorer in the league that season, with sixty-three goals in thirty-five games.

In February 1996, the New England Revolution drafted Vučković in the third round (25th overall) of the 1996 MLS Inaugural Player Draft. He played only one game with the Revolution before being released on June 28, 1996. He then signed with the New Hampshire Phantoms of USISL. That fall he rejoined the Tampa Bay Terror and would spend the next several years playing indoor soccer. While Vučković began the season in Tampa Bay, the team sold him to the Baltimore Spirit after only four games. He played the remainder of the 1996-1997 and the entire 1997–1998 seasons in Baltimore.

In 1997, Vučković played for the Rochester Rhinos in the USISL. He then began the 1998–1999 season with the Kansas City Attack, but was traded to the Detroit Rockers after six games. In April 1999, he signed with the Vermont Voltage of the fourth division USL Premier Development League. On January 30, 1999, the Rockers traded Vučković to the Philadelphia KiXX in exchange for Genoni Martinez and Joel Shanker. He finished the 1999–2000 season with the KiXX, then left indoor soccer to continue his outdoor career with the Voltage. Vuckovic briefly returned to indoor in 2001 for several games with the St. Louis Steamers of the World Indoor Soccer League. During his years in the NPSL, he was a two-time first team All Star and a two-time third team All Star.

Vučković was a co-owner, player, coach, and director of marketing for the Voltage until their dissolution.
