= Daryl Doran =

American soccer player (born 1963)

Personal information
- Full name: Daryl Doran
- Date of birth: March 29, 1963 (age 63)
- Place of birth: St. Louis, Missouri, United States
- Height: 5 ft 11 in (1.80 m)
- Positions: Midfielder; forward

Team information
- Current team: St. Louis Illusion
- Number: 7

College career
Years	Team	Apps	(Gls)
1981	Saint Louis Billikens		

Senior career*
Years	Team	Apps	(Gls)
1982–1988	St. Louis Steamers (indoor)	270	(106)
1988–1989	Los Angeles Lazers (indoor)	38	(6)
1989–1992	St. Louis Storm (indoor)	144	(54)
1992–1999	St. Louis Ambush (indoor)	253	(182)
2000–2005	St. Louis Steamers (indoor)	122	(69)
2008	St. Louis Illusion (indoor)	1	(2)

International career
1999	United States national futsal team	2	(0)

Managerial career
- 1992–1999: St. Louis Ambush
- 2000–2005: St. Louis Steamers
- 2013–2015: St. Louis Ambush
- * Club domestic league appearances and goals

Daryl Doran (born March 29, 1963) is a U.S. former indoor soccer player. His 827 games are the most of any player in American professional indoor soccer history. Doran previously coached the St. Louis Ambush in the Major Arena Soccer League from 2013 to 2015.

== High school and college ==
Doran grew up in St. Louis, Missouri, where he attended Christian Brothers College High School from 1977 to 1980. He was a four-year starter with the school's Varsity soccer team, finishing his career with 35 goals and 31 assists. He was named All-State three times and named Parade All-American twice. The local St. Louis Steamers of the Major Indoor Soccer League (MISL) drafted Doran when he was in high school, but he declined the offer, and instead graduated and matriculated at Saint Louis University. In December 1980, he was also selected by the Tampa Bay Rowdies in the second round of the North American Soccer League draft. The Steamers again drafted Doran during his freshman year of college. This time, he left college and turned professional.

== Playing career ==
=== Club ===
Doran played as a midfielder with the St. Louis Steamers until the team folded at the end of the 1987–1988 season. With no professional team in St. Louis, Doran moved to the Los Angeles Lazers (MISL) for the 1988–1989 season. However, the Lazers closed down at the end of the season and Doran moved back to St. Louis to sign with the expansion St. Louis Storm. When the Storm shut down at the end of the 1991–1992 season, Doran jumped to the National Professional Soccer League (NPSL), and signed with the St. Louis Ambush. He spent the next seven seasons with the Ambush as a midfielder, defender, and Player-coach. He was a six-time All-Star, twice a first-team All-NPSL player, and 1997's Defender of the Year. In 1999, Doran surprised St. Louis soccer fans when he left the Ambush for the resurrected St. Louis Steamers, now playing in the World Indoor Soccer League (WISL). The Ambush folded at the end of the season while the Steamers spent the 2000 and 2001 seasons in the WISL, followed by two more seasons in the new Major Indoor Soccer League. In 2008 Doran signed with the St. Louis Illusion of the Professional Arena Soccer League (PASL). Doran was the only player to play for every professional indoor soccer team in St. Louis until the Ambush were resurrected as a Major Arena Soccer League team (though he did coach them). Known for his incredible strength, Doran's personal best in the bench press was 385 pounds.

Doran has suffered from arthritis in his big toes since he was a teenager.

=== International ===
During his single season with the SLU Billikens, Doran was a United States men's national soccer team member but never made no "A" international appearances.

In 1999, Doran played two games with the U.S. national futsal team.

== Coaching career ==
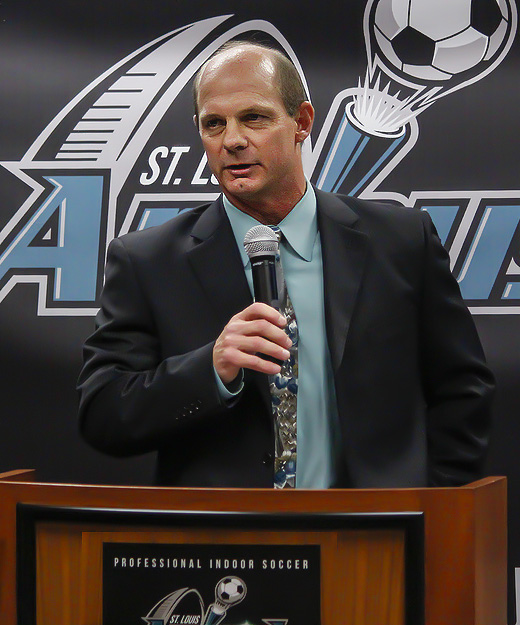
Ambush Head Coach, Doran.

In 1992, Doran began coaching the St. Louis Ambush. The 1994–95 Ambush won the NPSL championship and Doran was named league Coach of the Year. In 1999, Doran left the Ambush, replaced as head coach by Jamie Swanner. Doran is in second place, behind Keith Tozer, on the NPSL list of coaching wins with 166.

Doran left coaching after the 2004–2005 season with the Steamers.

In April 2006, the Steamers retired his jersey number, the second to be retired after that of Slobo Ilijevski. He is the Steamers' Vice President of Corporate Sales and Alumni Relations as well as owner and Athletic Trainer of Doran Fitness Center in O'Fallon, Missouri.

In 2013, Doran returned to coach the St. Louis Ambush of the Major Indoor Soccer League (MISL) as they were resurrected in St. Louis. Under Doran's direction, the Ambush play their home games at the Family Arena in St. Charles, Missouri.

After several failings and a 12–34 record from 2013 until 2015 Doran and assistant coach Joe Smugala were waived by the St. Louis Ambush. He was replaced by Tony Glavin.

== Honors ==
- NPSL Defender of the Year: 1997
- NPSL First Team All Star: 1997, 1998
- All Star Game MVP: 1997
- NPSL Coach of the Year: 1994
- St.Louis Sports Hall of Fame: 2015

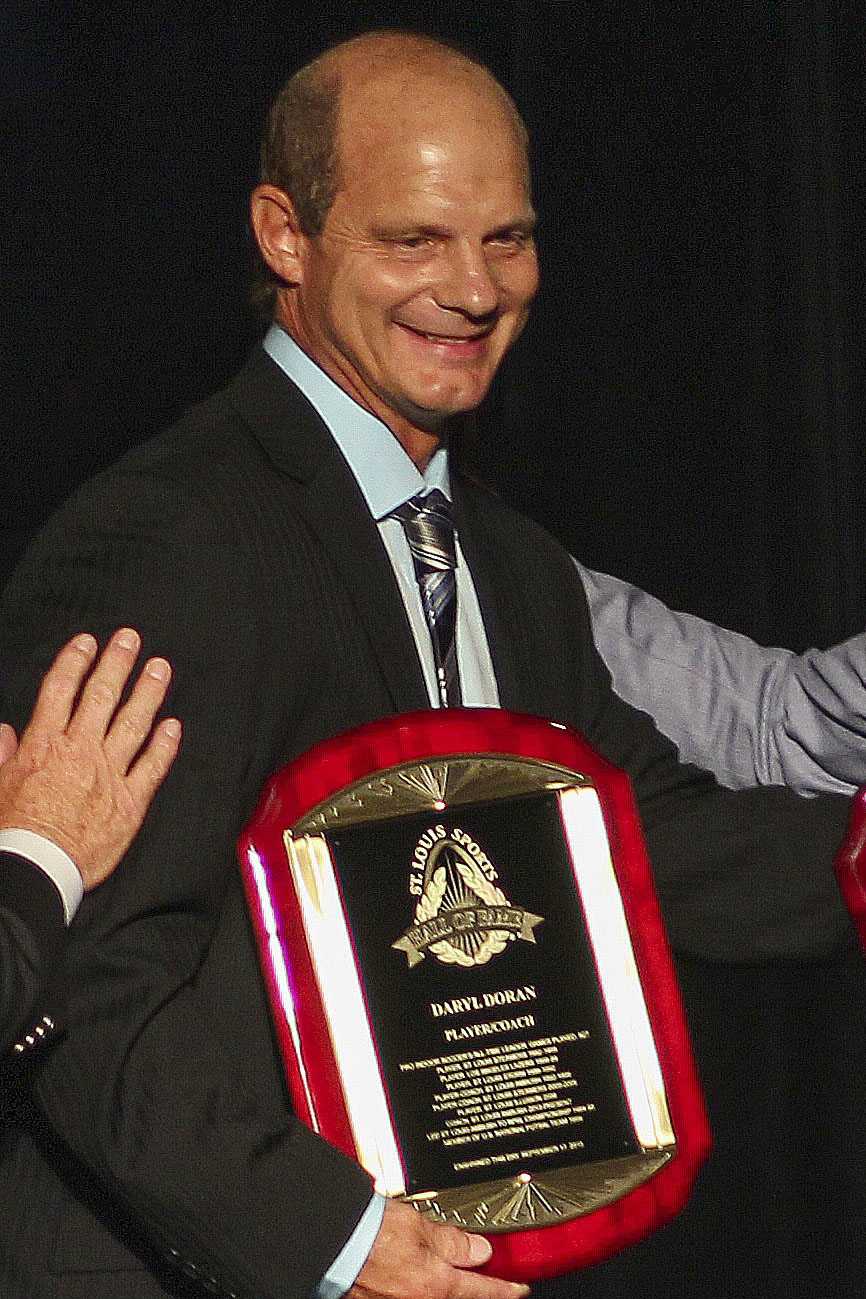
Doran inducted into the St.Louis Sports Hall of Fame, 2015.
