= Wes Wade =

American soccer player and coach

Personal information
- Date of birth: February 18, 1968 (age 58)
- Place of birth: Columbus, Ohio, United States
- Height: 6 ft 0 in (1.83 m)
- Positions: Forward; defender

Senior career*
Years	Team	Apps	(Gls)
1989–1990	Arizona Condors		
1989–1992	San Diego Sockers (indoor)	133	(44)
1992	Wichita Wings (indoor)	4	(7)
1992	Detroit Rockers (indoor)	11	(8)
1993	Arizona Sandsharks (indoor)	27	(39)
1993–2001	Kansas City Attack (indoor)	400	(271)
2001–2004	→ Kansas City Comets (indoor)	104	(48)

Managerial career
- 1990–1991: James Madison High School
- 2004–: Park University
- * Club domestic league appearances and goals

Wes Wade (born February 18, 1968) is a retired U.S. soccer player who spent two seasons playing outdoor soccer and fifteen playing indoor soccer. He was a six-time All Star and won five championships with two teams.

== Player ==
Wade attended Maryville High School in Ohio, graduating in 1986. In 1989, he signed with the Arizona Condors of the Western Soccer League. While the Condors finished well out of playoff contention, Wade tied for second in goal scoring and finished fourth in the league in total points. In the fall of 1989, Wade began his long indoor career with the San Diego Sockers of the Major Indoor Soccer League (MISL). Over the next three seasons, Wade and his teammates won three MISL championships. The league folded after the 1992 season and Wade jumped to the Wichita Wings of the National Professional Soccer League (NPSL). He spent only fifteen days with the Wings before moving to the Detroit Rockers for three months. The Rockers then traded Wade to the Kansas City Attack. Wade added to his championships when the Attack took the 1993 NPSL title. In 1993, the Continental Indoor Soccer League (CISL) was created as summer indoor league. The San Diego Sockers were a founding member and still held Wade's player rights. However, on June 3, 1993, the Sockers traded Wade to the Arizona Sandsharks for Thompson Usiyan, Alex Golovnia and Nassim Olabi. In the fall of 1993, he rejoined the Attack and remained with that team until it changed its name to the Kansas City Comets in 2001. Wade and the Comets played in the newly reconstructed Major Indoor Soccer League until his retirement following the 2003–2004 season.

== Coach ==
Wade coached with several youth teams throughout his playing career including the Extreme Faith Soccer Club in Kansas City and the James Madison High School team in 1990 and 1991. On September 13, 2004, Wade became the head coach of the Park University women's soccer team. He also coaches at The Soccer Academy in Westminster College in Santa Barbara. As of 2010, Wes coaches the Tucson Soccer Academy in Tucson, Arizona

== Honors ==
All Star

- Forward: 1994, 1995, 2000
- Defender: 1997, 1998, 2001
