= Cleveland Crunch =

American indoor soccer club

- Full name: Cleveland Crunch
- Nickname: The Crunch
- Founded: 1989; 37 years ago
- Stadium: Public Auditorium, Cleveland, Ohio
- Capacity: 10,000
- Coordinates: 41.504061°N 81.694017°W
- Owner(s): George S. Hoffman (1989–2001); Richard Dietrich (2001–2005); Ruscitto family (2020-present)
- Coach: Antonio Manfut
- League: Major Indoor Soccer League (1989–1992); National Professional Soccer League (1992–2001); Major Indoor Soccer League (2001–2005); Major Arena Soccer League 2 (2020-2022); Major League Indoor Soccer (2022-present)

The Cleveland Crunch are an American professional indoor soccer club based in Cleveland, Ohio.

Formed in 1989 as an expansion team in the Major Indoor Soccer League (MISL), the Crunch played a total of 16 seasons in three separate leagues under two different names. The team played three seasons in the original MISL, later known as the Major Soccer League (MSL), before joining the rival National Professional Soccer League (NPSL) in 1992. After nine seasons in the NPSL (including winning three league titles - 1994, 1996, 1999), the team joined a second incarnation of the Major Indoor Soccer League (MISL) in 2001. In 2002, the team was rebranded the Cleveland Force in honor of the former team of the same name. After four seasons in the second MISL, the team folded in 2005.

The Cleveland Crunch franchise was revived in 2020. The team joined Major Arena Soccer League 2 (MASL 2) for the 2021 season (winning the MASL 2 championship) and then joined Major League Indoor Soccer (MLIS) as part of the North Conference for its 2023 season, winning the MLIS Championship in 2024. All totaled, the Crunch recognizes all five championships won under the various incarnations of the franchise (three NPSL, one MASL 2, one MLIS).

== History ==
=== Founding of the Cleveland Crunch ===
The original Cleveland Force team had folded on July 22, 1988. Akron businessmen George S. Hoffman and Stuart Lichter formed an ownership group; named Al Miller general manager; and named former Force star Kai Haaskivi player-coach. Miller and Haaskivi brought back many players who had been fan favorites during the Force's height of popularity in the mid-1980s. The Crunch's home arena was originally the Richfield Coliseum.

Near the end of the Crunch's first season, Miller engineered a trade that would help Cleveland make the championship finals in seven of the next 10 years. He sent veteran forward Paul Wright to the San Diego Sockers for Zoran Karic, a feisty forward who immediately hit it off with Cleveland star Hector Marinaro. Within weeks, they were dubbed the "Dynamic Duo" and together rewrote the scoring record books for the next decade.

=== Move to NPSL and Three Championships ===
In 1992 the Crunch joined the National Professional Soccer League (NPSL) where it made a name for itself as a dominating soccer club, winning three championships in five seasons.

When the original MISL ceased operation in the summer of 1992, the Crunch, Baltimore and Wichita joined the rival NPSL as "expansion teams". All were permitted to keep only six players, then fill the rest of their rosters in an expansion draft of players made available by other NPSL teams.

The NPSL, in an effort to promote the sport in the United States, had a cap of two non-Americans allowed on a roster. Canadian-born Marinaro and Serbia native Karic filled that quota immediately. Besides Marinaro and Karic, holdovers from the MISL Crunch were midfielders Tommy Tanner and Andy Schmetzer, defender George Fernandez and young goalkeeper Otto Orf.

Orf had only a 14–32 record the previous three years with the club as backup to P.J. Johns. Before switching leagues, Miller had signed four-time NPSL goalkeeper of the year Jamie Swanner from the Canton Invaders. That contract was voided when the Crunch entered the NPSL. Swanner and several ex-Invaders signed as free agents with another expansion team, the Buffalo Blizzard. New Crunch coach Gary Hindley wanted Orf as his starter, citing the big keeper's strong throwing arm as an offensive weapon. He wanted Orf getting the ball to Marinaro and Karic with outlet passes at the team's new home, the CSU Convocation Center, where the playing surface was considerably smaller than at the Richfield Coliseum.

Orf became a 25-game winner, Marinaro and Karic shattered all scoring records, and Cleveland advanced to the league finals, where it lost to the Kansas City Attack, three games to two.

A year later, the Crunch finally broke through to win Cleveland's first championship in any pro sport in 30 years. Marinaro scored the dramatic game-winner in double overtime as Cleveland overcame a 15–10 deficit to defeat the visiting St. Louis Ambush, 17–15, to take the series, three games to one. The team went on to win two more championships, in the 1995–96 and 1998-99 seasons.

Lichter faded from view when the MISL folded and Hoffman became even more active as owner during the Crunch's almost yearly run to the finals. Hoffman eventually sold his interest to a Cleveland group headed by Richard Dietrich. Soon after, the NPSL reorganized itself as the new Major Indoor Soccer League in 2001. The team took on the old Cleveland Force name in 2002.

=== Franchise revival ===
In 2020, a new ownership group announced it was reviving the Cleveland Crunch brand, after the team's 18-year hiatus, and returning professional indoor soccer to Cleveland.

The team joined the Major Arena Soccer League 2 (MASL 2) for the 2021 season. In its first season back, the team earned the Cleveland Crunch's fourth league title, defeating the Wichita Wings 11-6 to win the MASL 2 Championship.

In 2023, the team moved to Major League Indoor Soccer (MLIS) winning the MLIS Championship in 2024, and giving the franchise its overall fifth title (from three different leagues) in team history.

Due to the Wolstein Center's transition from a multi-purpose facility to a facility dedicated exclusively to Cleveland State athletics effective on January 1, 2027, and with the venue's final non-athletic public event being scheduled for November 7, 2026, the Cleveland Crunch's home arena for the 2026-27 season will be the Public Auditorium.

== Championships ==
=== NPSL ===
- 1993–94
- 1995–96
- 1998–99

=== MASL 2 ===
- 2021

=== MLIS ===
- 2024

== Individual honors ==
Most Valuable Player Award

- 1992–93 Hector Marinaro
- 1993–94 Zoran Karic
- 1994–95 Hector Marinaro
- 1995–96 Hector Marinaro (shared with Milwaukee's Victor Nogueira)
- 1996–97 Hector Marinaro
- 1998–99 Hector Marinaro
- 1999–00 Hector Marinaro
- 2024-25 Admir Suljevic
- 2025-26 Admir Suljevic

Scoring Champions

- 1991–92 Zoran Karic, 102 points in 37 games
- 1992–93 Hector Marinaro, 248 points in 38 games
- 1993–94 Zoran Karic, 267 points in 36 games
- 1994–95 Hector Marinaro, 255 points in 32 games
- 1995–96 Hector Marinaro, 247 points in 33 games
- 1996–97 Hector Marinaro, 265 points in 36 games
- 1997–98 Hector Marinaro, 212 points in 36 games
- 1998–99 Hector Marinaro, 195 points in 34 games
- 1999–00 Hector Marinaro, 231 points in 38 games
- 2000–01 Hector Marinaro, 161 points in 34 games
- 2024-25 Admir Suljevic, 44 points in 8 games

Playmaker Award

- 2024-25 Admir Suljevic, 18 assists in 8 games
- 2025-26 Admir Suljevic, 22 assists in 9 games

All-Star Game MVP

- 1993 game in Cleveland, Zoran Karic
- 1995 game in Buffalo, Zoran Karic (shared with Kansas City's Brian Haynes)
- 1999 game in Wichita, Zoran Karic
- 2001 game in Buffalo, John Ball

Rookie of the Year Award

- 1991–92 Tommy Tanner
- 1994–95 Henry Gutierrez

All-Rookie Team

- 1991–92 Tommy Tanner, 1st team
- 1993–94 Troy Dayak, 2nd team
- 1994–95 Scott Schweitzer, 1st team
- 1994–95 Henry Gutierrez, 1st team
- 1995–96 Todd Dusosky, 2nd team
- 1996–97 John Ball, 1st team
- 1997–98 Shawn Boney, 2nd team
- 1997–98 Bo Simic, 2nd team
- 2001–02 Marco Reda, 1st team
- 2001–02 Justin Evans, 1st team

== Head coaches ==
- Kai Haaskivi (1989–90) 29–50, .367
- Trevor Dawkins (1990–92) 40–25, .615; Playoffs: 8–11, .421
- Gary Hindley (1992–95) 78–42, .650; Playoffs: 15–12, .555
- Bruce Miller (1995-01) 149–87, .631; Playoffs: 27–18, .600
- George Fernandez (2001) 3–5, .375
- Mike Pilger (2001–02) 17–31, .354
- Andy Schmetzer (2002–04) 33–38, .465; Playoffs: 0–2 .000
- Omid Namazi (2004–05) 23–16, .590; Playoffs: 2–2 .500
- Louis Kastelic (2020–22) 19-3 .864; Playoffs: 3-1 .750
- Benny Dargle (2022–23) 9-3, .750; Playoffs: 2-1, .666
- Antonio Manfut (2023–present) 30-6, .833; Playoffs: 3-2, .600

== Arenas ==
- Richfield Coliseum 1989–92
- Wolstein Center 1992-05; 2025 (playoffs); 2025-present
- Soccer Sportsplex 2020–2025
- I-X Center select games 2022-23

== Year-by-year ==
Year	League	Reg. season	Playoffs	Avg. attendance
1989–90	MISL	4th East, 20–32	did not qualify	5,543
1990–91	MSL	1st East, 29–23	Runners-up	4,640
1991–92	MSL	3rd MISL, 20–20	Lost Semifinal	7,056
1992–93	NPSL	2nd American, 25–15	Runners-up	6,483
1993–94	NPSL	2nd American, 23–17	Won Championship	6,677
1994–95	NPSL	1st American, 30–10	Lost Semifinal	7,579
1995–96	NPSL	1st American, 31–9	Won Championship	7,647
1996–97	NPSL	1st Central, 29–11	Runners-up	8,044
1997–98	NPSL	2nd Central, 21–19	Lost Conference Semifinal	8,265
1998–99	NPSL	1st Central, 26–14	Won Championship	8,034
1999–00	NPSL	1st Central, 27–17	Runners-up	6,290
2000–01	NPSL	5th American, 18–22	did not qualify	6,317
2001–02	MISL	5th MISL, 16–28	did not qualify	4,688
2002–03	MISL	2nd East, 19–17	Lost Conference Semifinal	5,381
2003–04	MISL	3rd East, 15–21	Lost Quarterfinal	4,955
2004–05	MISL	2nd MISL, 23–16	Runners-up	3,639
2020-21	MASL 2	2nd M2, 7-1	Won Championship	1,000
2021-22	MASL 2	1st Great Lakes, 12-0	Runners-up	1,000
2022-23	MLIS	2nd Eastern, 9-3	Lost Semifinal	1,000
2023-24	MLIS	1st MLIS, 9-3	Won Championship	1,000
2024-25	MLIS	1st MLIS, 11-1	Runners-up	1,000
2025-26	MLIS	2nd North, 10-2	Lost Semifinal	2,332

== Playoffs ==
1990–91
MSL Eastern Division Finals: Defeated Kansas City Comets, 4–3
MSL Championship Series: Lost to San Diego Sockers, 4–2
1991–92
MSL Semifinals: Lost to Dallas Sidekicks, 4–2
1992–93
NPSL American Division Semifinals: Defeated Buffalo Blizzard, 2–1
NPSL American Division Finals: Defeated Harrisburg Heat, 2–1
NPSL Championship Series: Lost to Kansas City Attack, 3–2
1993–94
NPSL American Division Semifinals: Defeated Buffalo Blizzard, 2–1
NPSL American Division Finals: Defeated Harrisburg Heat, 2–1
NPSL Championship Series: Defeated St. Louis Ambush, 3–1
1994–95
NPSL American Division Semifinals: Defeated Buffalo Blizzard, 2–1
NPSL American Division Finals: Lost to Harrisburg Heat, 3–0
1995–96
NPSL American Division Semifinals: Defeated Buffalo Blizzard, 2–1
NPSL American Division Finals: Defeated Baltimore Spirit, 3–1
NPSL Championship Series: Defeated Kansas City Attack, 4–2
1996–97
NPSL American Conference Semifinals: Defeated Baltimore Spirit, 2–1
NPSL American Conference Finals: Defeated Harrisburg Heat, 3–1
NPSL Championship Series: Lost to Kansas City Attack, 4–0
1997–98
NPSL American Conference Semifinals: Lost to Philadelphia Kixx, 2–0
1998–99
NPSL American Conference Semifinals: Defeated Montreal Impact, 2–1
NPSL American Conference Finals: Defeated Philadelphia Kixx, 2–0
NPSL Championship Series: Defeated St. Louis Ambush, 3–2
1999–2000
NPSL American Conference Semifinals: Defeated Montreal Impact, 2–0
NPSL American Conference Finals: Defeated Baltimore Blast, 2–0
NPSL Championship Series: Lost to Milwaukee Wave, 3–2
2002–03
MISL Eastern Conference Semifinals: Lost to Baltimore Blast 1–0
2003–04
MISL Eastern Conference Quarterfinals: Lost to Dallas Sidekicks 1–0
2004–05
MISL Semifinals: Defeated Philadelphia Kixx 2–0
MISL Finals: Lost to Milwaukee Wave 2–0
2020-21
MASL2 Semifinals: Defeated FC Amarillo Bombers 12–6
MASL2 Finals: Defeated Wichita Wings 11–6
2021-22
MASL2 Semifinals: Defeated Muskingun Risers 6-5
MASL2 Finals: Lost to San Diego Sockers2 4-7
2022-23
MLIS Wild Card: Defeated Chicago Mustangs 12-6
MLIS Semifinals: Lost to Omaha Kings 7-8
2023-24
MLIS Semifinals: Defeated Grand Rapids City FC 11-5
MLIS Finals: Defeated Omaha Kings 9-4
2024-25
MLIS Semifinals: Defeated PAO Chicago 14-2
MLIS Finals: Lost to Amarillo Bombers 10-8 OT
2025-26
MLIS Semifinals: Lost to Amarillo Bombers 9-5
