= Harrisburg Heat (1991–2003) =

- Old logo (1991–1997)
- Full name: Harrisburg Heat
- Founded: 1991
- Dissolved: 2003
- Ground: Pennsylvania Farm Show Complex & Expo Center; Harrisburg, Pennsylvania
- Capacity: 7,317
- Owners: Dr. Rex Herbert; Rodney Rumberger
- League: NPSL II & MISL II

The Harrisburg Heat were an American professional indoor soccer team based in Harrisburg, Pennsylvania. The team was part of the National Professional Soccer League, which later became the Major Indoor Soccer League, and has been defunct since 2003.

== History ==
The Harrisburg Heat were first formed during the 1991–92 season by Dr. Rex Herbert, following the folding of the Hershey Impact, another NPSL team for which Herbert was the team physician. Along with other investors, Herbert produced the fiscal and economic backdrop to support the team.

The Heat went through several seasons when they were among the most financially sound teams in the league. However, their only trip to the league finals was during the 1994–95 season, when the Heat took on the St. Louis Ambush, also now defunct. The Heat were swept in four games, losing 19–9, 18–8, 12–7 and 14–11.

The last few years of the team's existence saw declining attendance numbers, partly due to the State Farm Show Complex's construction project that restricted parking and also charged a fee for parking. Also, a portion of the team's ownership passed from Herbert to Rodney Rumberger, a Harrisburg-area businessman. Many of the team's popular players also had retired or signed with other teams. The team ceased operations following the 2002–03 season. Despite several attempts to put together a new ownership group, the Heat did not return the next season.

On May 2, 2012, it was announced that an expansion team named after the Harrisburg Heat will join the Professional Arena Soccer League in the fall, owned by the league. Longtime Heat broadcaster John Wilsbach took over as owner of the team from 2013 to 2016 and then sold it to Carl Delmont. The team is currently a member of the Major Arena Soccer League, a rebranding of the PASL.

The original Heat's home arena was in the Pennsylvania Farm Show Complex & Expo Center.

== Year-by-year ==
| Year | League | Reg. season | Playoffs | Attendance |
|---|---|---|---|---|
| 1991–92 | NPSL | 2nd, American | Lost Quarterfinals | 3,114 |
| 1992–93 | NPSL | 4th, American | Lost Semifinals | 4,435 |
| 1993–94 | NPSL | 4th, American | Lost 2nd Round | 4,847 |
| 1994–95 | NPSL | 2nd, American | Lost Finals | 6,003 |
| 1995–96 | NPSL | 3rd, American | Lost Division Semifinals | 6,003 |
| 1996–97 | NPSL | 1st, American East | Lost Conference Finals | 7,518 |
| 1997–98 | NPSL | 2nd, American East | Lost Conference Semifinals | 5,905 |
| 1998–99 | NPSL | 2nd, American East | Lost Conference Quarterfinals | 5,600 |
| 1999–00 | NPSL | 3rd, American East | Did not qualify | 5,094 |
| 2000–01 | NPSL | 1st, American | Lost Conference Semifinals | 5,178 |
| 2001–02 | MISL | 6th, MISL | Did not qualify | 4,104 |
| 2002–03 | MISL | 4th, Eastern | Did not qualify | 3,519 |

== Ownership ==
- Dr. Rex Herbert (1991–03)
- Rodney Rumberger (1995–03)
- Rob Bleecher

== Staff ==
- Vice President – Jim Pollihan
- General Manager – Gregg Cook
- Public Relations Director – Gregory Bibb
- Equipment Manager – Mike Butala
- Director of Broadcasting – John Wilsbach

== Head coaches ==
- 1991–99 Jim Pollihan
- 1999-02 Richard Chinapoo
- 2002–03 Erich Geyer
