= Zoran Karić =

Yugoslavian footballer

Personal information
- Full name: Zoran Karić
- Date of birth: 1 August 1961 (age 65)
- Place of birth: Kačarevo, FPR Yugoslavia
- Height: 5 ft 9 in (1.75 m)
- Position: Forward

Senior career*
Years	Team	Apps	(Gls)
–1987	Partizan		
1987–1990	San Diego Sockers (indoor)	98	(80)
1990–2000	Cleveland Crunch (indoor)	339	(651)
1996	Rochester Rhinos	6	(0)
2000–2001	Kansas City Attack (indoor)	12	(12)
2001–2002	Harrisburg Heat (indoor)	17	(7)
2002–2004	Cleveland Force (indoor)	27	(9)
2011	Syracuse Silver Knights (indoor)	3	(0)
- * Club domestic league appearances and goals

Zoran Karić (Serbian: Зоран Карић, pronounced [ˈzorɑn ˈkaːritɕ]; born 1 August 1961) is a retired Yugoslavian soccer forward who began his career with FK Partizan before spending seventeen seasons playing indoor soccer in the United States. He was the 1988 MISL Rookie of the Year, 1992 MISL leading scorer, 1994 NPSL MVP, and a nine time, first team All Star.

== Bio ==
Karić was born and raised in Kačarevo, Yugoslavia. He began his career as a child in Yugoslavia. He signed with FK Partizan of the Yugoslavian First Division. In 1987, Karić moved to the United States and signed with the San Diego Sockers of the Major Indoor Soccer League (MISL). He won two championships (1988, 1989) with the Sockers. In his second year in San Diego, Karić was the team's second leading scorer behind Branko Segota. He began the 1989–90 season with the Sockers, but was traded to the Cleveland Crunch for Paul Wright on 6 March 1990. Paired with Hector Marinaro, the Crunch now boasted one of the strongest pairs of forwards in the league. Karić was named a first team All Star this year. In the 1990–91 season, he was the league's second leading scorer and was again named a first team All Star. Karić led the points chart during the 1991–92 season.

In the summer of 1992, the MISL collapsed and the Crunch moved to the National Professional Soccer League (NPSL). With Marinaro and Karić setting all sorts of scoring records, the Crunch reached the league finals six times in eight years, winning championships in 1994, 1996 and 1999. Karić peaked in 1994 when he finished as the NPSL points leader on the strength of his 104 assists and 85 goals. Karić was named both a first team All Star and the NPSL MVP. In 1996, he played six games with the Rochester Rhinos in the American Professional Soccer League. Recurring tendinitis led him to leave the team on 20 July 1996.

In 2000, the Crunch decided not to resign Karić and he went to the Kansas City Attack. However, injury had begun to slow him, and he saw time in only 12 games that season. In 2001, he went to the Harrisburg Heat. Once again, he saw time in a limited number of games. In 2002, he rejoined the Crunch, now renamed the Cleveland Force. He spent two seasons with the Force, playing only four games in 2002–2003 and 23 the next season. On 2 October 2004, the Cleveland Force signed Karić to a two-year contract, but he retired without playing a game that season. Since he left the professional game, he continues to play with Beck's Cleveland All Stars, a team in an amateur indoor soccer league in Cleveland.

In 2011, The Syracuse Silver Knights ( http://www.syracusesilverknights.com/ ) signed Karić to the team in their inaugural season. In the Knights first game, Karić recorded two assists in the 16–15 win over the Rochester Lancers. However, he only played in 3 games before retirement, being a friend of the Silver Knights head coach, Tommy Tanner. Karic finished his professional career with Regular Season: 505 Games, 761 Goals, 849 Assists, 1,610 Points. Playoffs: 111 Games, 137 Goals, 189 Assists, 326 Points. He is the all-time leader in assists (1,038) and he’s 2nd all-time in points (1,936) in indoor soccer history.

== Honors ==
- Rookie of the Year:
- 1988
- MVP:
- 1994
- First team All Star
- 1990, 1991, 1992, 1993, 1994, 1995, 1996, 1997, 1998
- Goals Leader:
- 1992
- Assists Leader:
- 1992, 1993, 1994, 1997, 1998, 1999
- Points Leader:
- 1992, 1994
- All-Star MVP:
- 1993, 1995, 1999
