= Buffalo Blizzard =

Soccer club in Buffalo, New York, United States

Buffalo Blizzard
Operated	1992–2001
Arena	The Aud & HSBC Arena
Based in	Buffalo, New York
Colors	blue, purple, black, and white
League	NPSL II
Division Championships	1996–97 & 1997–98

The Buffalo Blizzard was a soccer club that existed from 1992 to 2001 in Buffalo, New York.

== History ==
The team was originally owned by the Knox brothers who owned the Buffalo Sabres at the time, and additionally by the Riches who owned the minor league baseball Buffalo Bisons. During their last five years of existence, the team was owned by John Bellanti who had previously owned the Buffalo Stallions of the original Major Indoor Soccer League.

The team's attendance was always in the top five of the league until its last season, and they had their record high attendance year in 1993–1994 season with an average attendance of 8,435 fans. The major stars of the team were the Pikuzinski brothers, Rudy and Randy, who rank sixth and ninth on the all-time points list. The team colors were blue, purple, black, and white, and the team mascot was a dog Spyke who rode a four-wheeler. The team never won a playoff series.

The NPSL ceased operation in 2001 and several of its remaining teams formed the Major Indoor Soccer League, but the Blizzard declined to participate and folded at that time.

== Year-by-year record ==
Year	GP	W	L	PF	PA	PCT	Finish	Playoffs
1992–93	40	23	17	570	503	.575	3rd Amer	Lost Quarterfinals
1993–94	40	19	21	499	515	.475	3rd Amer	Lost 1st Round
1994–95	40	20	20	579	552	.500	4th Amer	Lost 1st Round
1995–96	40	21	19	562	586	.525	4th Amer	Lost Division Semifinals
1996–97	40	21	19	545	469	.525	1st North	Lost Conference Semifinals
1997–98	40	21	19	495	504	.525	1st North	Lost Conference Semifinals
1998–99	40	22	18	430	510	.550	2nd North	Lost Conference Semifinals
1999-00	44	19	25	495	617	.432	3rd Cent	Did not qualify
2000–01	40	22	18	513	464	.550	2nd Amer	Lost Quarterfinals

== Coaches ==
1992–1994: (England) Trevor Dawkins
1994–1996: (United States) Jim May
1996–1997: (United States) George Fernandez
1997–1998: (Argentina) Carlos Salguero
1998–1999: (United States) Jim May
1999–2001: (England) Paul Kitson

== Players ==
- (United States) Rudy Pikuzinski 1992-2000
- (United States) Randy Pikuzinski 1992-2001

== Year by year average game attendance ==
- 1992/93: 7,068
- 1993/94: 8,435
- 1994/95: 7,283
- 1995/96: 6,364
- 1996/97: 7,974
- 1997/98: 7,834
- 1998/99: 7,068
- 1999/00: 6,587
- 2000/01: 4,635
