= Victor Nogueira =

Mozambique-born American soccer player

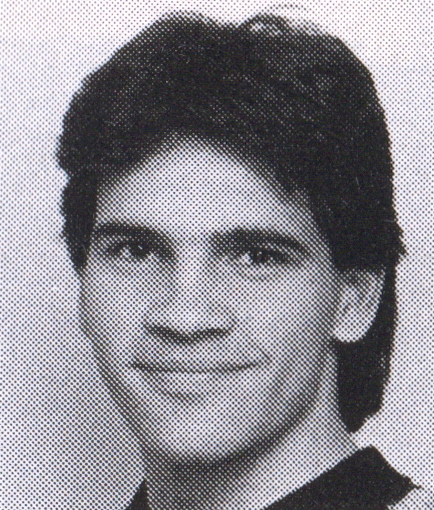
- Nogueira circa 1984

Personal information
- Full name: Victor Nogueira
- Date of birth: July 17, 1959 (age 67)
- Place of birth: Maputo, Mozambique
- Height: 6 ft 1 in (1.85 m)
- Position: Goalkeeper

Senior career*
Years	Team	Apps	(Gls)
1974–1977	Rangers		(10)
1977–1979	Newcastle United	0	(0)
1979–1980	Atlanta Chiefs	21	(0)
1982	Montreal Manic	19	(0)
1983–1984	Chicago Sting (NASL)	39	(0)
1984–1987	Chicago Sting (MISL)	82	(0)
1987–1988	Cleveland Force (indoor)	20	(0)
1988–1992	San Diego Sockers (indoor)	144	(0)
1992–2003	Milwaukee Wave (indoor)	371	(0)
2003–2005	San Diego Sockers (indoor)	42	(0)
- * Club domestic league appearances and goals

Victor Nogueira (born July 17, 1959) is a retired American soccer goalkeeper. Nogueira spent six seasons in the North American Soccer League, but gained his greatest recognition in over twenty seasons in three indoor leagues, the Major Indoor Soccer League, National Professional Soccer League and the second Major Indoor Soccer League. He was also a member of the U.S. futsal team which took second place at the 1992 FIFA Futsal World Championship, and he is the father of FC Kansas City and United States forward Casey Loyd. He was elected to the Indoor Soccer Hall of Fame in 2011.

== Outdoor soccer ==
=== Early career ===
Nogueira was born in Maputo, Mozambique, but was raised in South Africa. In 1974, when he was fifteen, Nogueira signed with Rangers, a South African club based in Johannesburg. While he gained his fame as a goalkeeper, he began his career as a forward. In his first season with Rangers as a keeper, he was switched to forward for the last 10 games and scored 10 goals. He was traded to Newcastle United in England and played on the reserves for 6 months prior to joining the Atlanta Chiefs.

=== NASL ===
In 1979, Nogueira moved to the Atlanta Chiefs of the North American Soccer League (NASL). He played two seasons in Atlanta, then missed the 1981 season after surgery to repair a torn medial collateral ligament in his left knee. Nogueira played nineteen games with the Montreal Manic in 1982, then moved to the Chicago Sting for the 1983 and 1984 NASL seasons. Nogueira and the Sting won the 1984 NASL title, the last year the league existed.

== Indoor soccer ==
=== NASL ===
In 1979–80, the NASL held an indoor season. The Chiefs went 10-2 and won the Eastern Division before falling to the Tampa Bay Rowdies in two games in the playoffs. Nogueira was the second-leading goalkeeper in the league with a 3.67 Goals Against Average.

=== MISL ===
The NASL had planned a 1984–1985 indoor season, but cancelled it. When the league subsequently cancelled its 1985 outdoor season and folded, the Chicago Sting jumped to the Major Indoor Soccer League (MISL). In 1986, the Sting traded Nogueira to the Cleveland Force for Cris Vaccaro. The Force folded at the end of the 1987–1988 season and Nogueira moved to the San Diego Sockers.

When he arrived in San Diego, Nogueira joined a championship team who had Zoltán Tóth, the top goalkeeper in the league. Nogueira quickly supplanted Toth as the team's starting goalkeeper as the Sockers won 1988–1989 MISL title. Nogueira was also named the MISL Goalkeeper of the Year. The Sockers repeated as champions every season through 1991–1992 as Nogueira was a three-time Goalkeeper of the Year. The league folded at the end of the season and the Sockers moved to the Continental Indoor Soccer League. Nogueira did not make that move, but jumped to the Milwaukee Wave of the National Professional Soccer League (NPSL). Although thirty-two at the time, Nogueira would spend the next eleven years with the Wave.

=== NPSL ===
During his eleven seasons in Milwaukee, Nogeuira won another three titles as the Wave won 1997–1998, 1999–2000 and 2000–2001 championships. In addition to winning the title in 1998, Nogueira was named the league MVP, playoff MVP, All-Star MVP, and Goalkeeper of the Year and first team All Star. He was the first indoor soccer player ever to reach 40,000 career minutes.

=== MISL II ===
On October 2, 2003, Nogueira signed a one-year contract with San Diego Sockers which was now competing in a new Major Indoor Soccer League (MISL). The Sockers began the 2004–2005 season, but folded after ten games. On January 5, 2005, the Baltimore Blast selected Nogueira in the third round of the MISL Dispersal Draft following the folding of the Sockers. Nogueira chose to retire instead.

== Futsal ==
Nogueira earned sixteen caps with the U.S. National Futsal team from 1992 to 2000. The team gained its greatest success in 1992 when it took second place at FIFA Futsal World Championship. Nogueira was named both as the top goalkeeper of the tournament and to the first team all-tournament team. While the U.S. did not place in the 1996 tournament, Nogueira was selected as an honorable mention All Tournament. In 2000, the U.S. placed third at the CONCACAF Tournament, but only the top two teams qualified for the World Championship. Nogueira retired from the futsal team following the CONCACAF Tournament.

== Coaching ==
While with the Milwaukee Wave, Nogueira coached the men's soccer team at Cardinal Stritch College in Milwaukee, WI from 1993-1995. Nogueira coached the team to their first Lake Michigan Conference championship in 1994. The team also won the conference tournament, and qualified for the NAIA Division 2 national playoffs that same year. He was also the director of coaching for the Cedarburg Soccer Club in Cedarburg, WI from 1995-2002. Since his retirement from playing, Nogueira has also coached professional teams, college teams, and youth soccer clubs. His daughter Casey played in the National Women's Soccer League with FC Kansas City, and has also played for the United States women's national soccer team. Casey's husband Zach Loyd played in Major League Soccer for FC Dallas. Nogueira also coaches the Torrey Pines High School freshman soccer team. In 2010, Victor moved to Orange County and coaches with the West Coast Futbul Club. In 2018, Nogueira became the goalkeeping coach for the Orange County Soccer Club playing in the USL Championship.

== Honors ==
Championships

- NASL: 1984
- MISL: 1989, 1990, 1991, 1992
- NPSL: 1998, 2000, 2001

MVP

- MISL: 1991, 1992
- NPSL: 1996, 1998

Goalkeeper of the Year

- MISL: 1989, 1991
- NPSL: 1994, 1996, 1997, 1998, 1999, 2000, 2001
- MISL II: 2002, 2003

Championship MVP

- MISL: 1989
- NPSL: 1998

All Star Game MVP

- NPSL: 1998

First team All Star

- MISL: 1990, 1991
- NPSL: 1994, 1997, 1998, 1999,
- MISL II: 2002, 2003

FIFA FUTSAL Championship

- First Team All-World: 1992
- Honorable Mention All World: 1996
- Best Goalkeeper: 1992
