= Hector Marinaro (soccer, born 1964) =

Canadian soccer coach and former player (born 1964)

Personal information
- Full name: Hector Luis Marinaro
- Date of birth: December 6, 1964 (age 61)
- Place of birth: Toronto, Ontario
- Height: 5 ft 9 in (1.75 m)
- Position: Forward

Senior career*
| Years | Team | Apps | (Gls) |
| ?–1982, 1983 | Toronto Italia | | |
| 1983–1984 | Cleveland Force (indoor) | 5 | (0) |
| 1986–1988 | Minnesota Strikers (indoor) | 45 | (75) |
| 1986–1988 | Toronto Blizzard | 41 | (9) |
| 1988–1989 | Los Angeles Lazers (indoor) | 44 | (47) |
| 1989 | Hamilton Steelers | 14 | (4) |
| 1989 | North York Rockets | 5 | (1) |
| 1993 | Toronto Blizzard | 27 | (7) |
| 1996 | Rochester Raging Rhinos | 4 | (7) |
| 1989–2002 | Cleveland Crunch (indoor) | 448 | (1003) |
| 2002–2004 | Cleveland Force (indoor) | 85 | (96) |

International career
| 1986–1995 | Canada | 6 | (0) |

Managerial career
- 2002–2004: Cleveland Force (assistant)'
- 2006–2021: John Carroll University
- 2013–2014: Cleveland Freeze
- * Club domestic league appearances and goals

Hector Luis Marinaro Jr. (born December 6, 1964) is a former Canadian soccer player and coach.

As a player he was the all-time leader in points and goals in professional indoor soccer, and made 6 appearances for the Canada national team. Marinaro was inducted into the Greater Cleveland Sports Hall of Fame in 2005.

== Club career ==
=== Youth ===
Marinaro is the son of Hector Marinaro, Sr., a native of Argentina who both played and coached extensively in Canada.

=== Indoor career ===
Marinaro returned to Cleveland because of the excellent memories he had of playing his rookie year there.

On June 23, 2004, the Chicago Storm drafted Marinaro with the 16th pick in the MISL expansion draft. However, he made his intentions to retire known to the Storm and on October 11, 2004, the team traded Marinaro to the Cleveland Force in exchange for cash. The Storm did this in order to allow him to retire with the Force, the team with which he began his career.During his 19-year indoor career, Marinaro scored 1,233 goals and added 702 assists for 1,935 points in just 685 games. In the playoffs, he scored another 224 goals and added 96 assists for 320 points in 104 games. Marinaro is the all-time leading in goals (1,457) and points (2,255) in professional indoor soccer. He scored his 1,000th point against his brother Rob, a goalkeeper for the Chicago Power. Hector was a seven-time league MVP the most in any professional sport in the United States. In May 2005, the MISL announced that it would name its annual MVP award the Marinaro Award.

=== Outdoor career ===
In addition to his extensive indoor career, Marinaro spent several seasons playing outdoor soccer. In 1986, he played for the Toronto Blizzard of the National Soccer League while his father was an assistant coach with the team. Marinaro remained with the Blizzard for the 1987 Canadian Soccer League season then returned to the Blizzard for the 1993 American Professional Soccer League season. He also had one season with Rochester Raging Rhinos of the A-League in 1996. Marinaro scored seven goals, as the Rhinos fell to the Seattle Sounders in the championship game.

== International career ==
Marinaro also earned six caps with Canada. Marinaro's first game with the national team was a 4–0 win over Indonesia on August 30, 1986, and his last was a 2–1 loss to Chile on October 11, 1995.

== Coaching career ==
In 2002, the Cleveland Force elevated Marinaro to the position of assistant coach in addition to his playing duties. He continued in that role until retiring in 2004.

On January 31, 2006, John Carroll University hired Marinaro as the head coach of the men's soccer team.

Marinaro retired from coaching at John Carroll in May, 2021. He departed as JCU's all-time winningest coach in the history of the Men's Soccer program with a 185-82-30 overall record while going 98-23-13 in the Ohio Athletic Conference (OAC). The JCU Blue Streaks won five OAC Tournament Championships and captured five OAC Regular Season Championships during his tenure.
