= 1986–87 American Indoor Soccer Association season =

American Indoor Soccer Association
- Season: 1986–87
- Champions: Louisville Thunder
- Matches: 168
- Goals: 1,534 (9.13 per match)
- Top goalscorer: Rudy Pikuzinski (51)

The 1986–87 American Indoor Soccer Association season was the third season of the league. The Columbus Capitals and Kalamazoo Kangaroos did not return after the 1985–86 season. Four teams, including former NASL stalwarts, Tampa Bay Rowdies, joined the league in 1986–87. The Fort Wayne Flames, Memphis Storm and Toledo Pride were all newly formed expansion teams. The addition of Tampa Bay in particular, and Memphis to a lesser degree, marked the AISA's first clubs outside of the Midwest. Rudy Pikuzinski of Canton won the league scoring title en route to his first of three straight MVP awards, while Memphis boss Terry Nicholl took home Coach of the Year honors.

Just as in previous AISA seasons, Canton and Louisville proved to be the class of the league and faced each other in the finals for a third straight year. For the first time the championship series went the full five games, and in a clash of titans, the Thunder finally bested their rivals, three games to two. Alas, the Thunder's glory would be short lived, as Game 5 proved to be their final match ever. Ownership, no longer able to bear the financial losses, opted to shut the team down instead trying to defend their crown for 1987–88.

== League standings ==
=== Northern Division ===
Pos	Team	Pld	W	L	GF	GA	GD	PCT	GB
1	Canton Invaders	42	31	11	255	165	+90	.738	—
2	Chicago Shoccers	42	26	16	232	200	+32	.619	5
3	Toledo Pride	42	14	28	179	210	−31	.333	17
4	Milwaukee Wave	42	12	30	148	222	−74	.286	19

Source: RSSSF

=== Southern Division ===
Pos	Team	Pld	W	L	GF	GA	GD	PCT	GB
1	Louisville Thunder	42	27	15	213	181	+32	.643	—
2	Memphis Storm	42	24	18	180	166	+14	.571	3
3	Tampa Bay Rowdies	42	21	21	170	172	−2	.500	6
4	Fort Wayne Flames	42	13	29	157	218	−61	.310	14

Source: RSSSF

== All-Star Game ==
On February 21 the Louisville Thunder hosted the AISA All-Star Game. Instead of using the Thunder's home field of Broadbent Arena at the state fairgrounds, the match was played at the more intimate Louisville Gardens in downtown Louisville. In a departure from the previous season, both squads were composed of mixed rosters. In the past, the host team had faced all-stars from the rest of the league's teams. The Northern Division all-stars wore blue jerseys, while the Southern squad wore grey. Players on the winning side each received a $100 bonus. The Northern Division squad defeated their Southern counterparts by a score of 7–5. Louisville forward Zoran Savic (1 goal, 2 assists) and Canton goalie, Jamie Swanner (11 saves, 2 goals given), were named the game's offensive and defensive MVPs respectively. Although neither game would come to pass, it was also announced that the 1988 All-Star game would be hosted by Tampa Bay, with the 1989 game being awarded to Milwaukee.

=== Southern Division roster ===
- Coach: Terry Nicholl, Memphis

Starters	Pos	Reserves
Victor Petroni, Louisville	G	Arnie Mausser, Tampa Bay
Gregg Willin, Memphis; Paul Kato, Louisville	D	Tom Alioto, Fort Wayne; Peter Roe, Tampa Bay; Glenn Ervine, Tampa Bay
Chris Hellenkamp, Louisville	M	Tony Carbognani, Memphis; Mark Lugris, Fort Wayne
Steve Wegerle, Tampa Bay; Zoran Savic, Louisville	F	Jim Gabarra, Louisville; Tim Walters*, Tampa Bay

*Original selection Rubén Astigarraga of Tampa Bay was unable to play and was replaced by teammate Tim Walters.

=== Northern Division roster ===
- Coach: Trevor Dawkins, Canton

Starters	Pos	Reserves
Jamie Swanner, Canton	G	Rick Schweizer, Milwaukee
Oscar Pisano, Canton; Martin Rancon, Chicago	D	Walt Schlothauer, Canton; Tim Tyma, Canton; John Dolinsky, Milwaukee
Don Tobin, Canton	M	Art Kramer, Canton; Ruben Stivan, Chicago
Carlos Salguero, Toledo; Salvador Valencia, Chicago	F	Elvis Comrie, Chicago; Rudy Pikuzinski, Canton

=== Match report ===
February 21, 1987
8:05pm CST

Northern Division	7–5	Southern Division
Comrie 14:18, 38:17; Dolinsky 23:42; Schlothauer 33:21 (PP); Tobin 35:09; Salguero 43:12; Kramer 59:57	report	Wegerle 5:31; Savic 21:37; Gabarra 46:22 (PP), 52:27; Ervine 47:32

Louisville Gardens, Louisville, Kentucky
Attendance: 2,473

== Playoffs ==
First Round
4	Memphis Storm	4	4	3
5	Tampa Bay Rowdies	1	5	2
3	Chicago Shoccers	4	7	1
6	Toledo Pride	5	3	0

Semifinals
1	Canton Invaders	4	5	–
4	Memphis Storm	3	3	–
2	Louisville Thunder	7	5	–
3	Chicago Shoccers	3	4	–

Finals
1	Canton Invaders	6	2	4	4	4
2	Louisville Thunder	5	3	5	2	6

== League leaders ==
=== Scoring ===
Player	Team	GP	G	A	Pts
Rudy Pikuzinski	Canton	42	51	30	81
Zoran Savic	Louisville	41	42	34	77
Salvador Valencia	Chicago	40	47	28	75
Carlos Salguero	Toledo	42	45	23	68
Elvis Comrie	Chicago	40	37	31	68
Kia Zolgharnain	Canton	42	34	31	66
Chris Hellenkamp	Louisville	41	26	36	62
Steve Wegerle	Tampa Bay	35	26	36	62
Jim Gabarra	Louisville	40	36	23	59
Oscar Albuquerque	Memphis	24	35	18	53

=== Goalkeeping ===
Player	Team	GP	Min	SA	SV	GA	GAA	W	L
Yaro Dachniwsky	Memphis	18	958	432	187	53	3.33	10	8
Jamie Swanner	Canton	24	1402	600	312	84	3.59	19	4
Arnie Mausser	Tampa Bay	35	2074	891	436	126	3.64	19	16
Victor Petroni	Louisville	26	1392	671	339	94	4.05	14	8
Bill Naumovski	Canton	20	1012	504	222	76	4.10	12	7

== League awards ==
- Most Valuable Player: Rudy Pikuzinski, Canton
- Coach of the Year: Terry Nicholl, Memphis
- Defender of the Year: Tim Tyma, Canton
- Goalkeeper of the Year: Jamie Swanner, Canton
- Rookie of the Year: Paul Zimmerman, Chicago

== All-AISA teams ==
First Team	Pos	Second Team
Jamie Swanner, Canton	G	Arnie Mausser, Tampa Bay
Tim Tyma, Canton	D	Tomo Condric, Canton
Gregg Willin, Memphis	D	Martin Rincon, Chicago
Chris Hellenkamp, Louisville	M	Elvis Comrie, Chicago
Zoran Savic, Louisville	F	Salvador Valencia, Chicago
Rudy Pikuzinski, Canton	F	Carlos Salguero, Toledo
