= 1985–86 American Indoor Soccer Association season =

American Indoor Soccer Association
- Season: 1985–86
- Champions: Canton Invaders; 2nd title
- Matches: 120
- Goals: 1,255 (10.46 per match)
- Top goalscorer: Kia Zolgharnain (52)

The 1985–86 American Indoor Soccer Association season was the second season for the league. The only change in teams from the inaugural season was that Chicago changed its name from the Vultures to the Shoccers. Zoran Savic of Louisville won the scoring title, but Canton's Kia Zolgharnain netted the most goals with 52. League assists leader, Don Tobin, also of Canton was voted MVP, while his coach Trevor Dawkins took home Coach of the Year honors.

Canton and Louisville finished top of the table, well ahead the rest of the league. Both swept their semifinal opponents, to again face each other in the finals. In the championship round, the Thunder proved to be no match for the Invaders and were themselves swept in three games.

== League Standings ==
Pos	Team	Pld	W	L	GF	GA	GD	PCT	GB
1	Canton Invaders	40	33	7	243	149	+94	.825	—
2	Louisville Thunder	40	31	9	251	185	+66	.775	2
3	Kalamazoo Kangaroos	40	17	23	176	179	−3	.425	16
4	Chicago Shoccers	40	15	25	196	225	−29	.375	18
5	Columbus Capitals	40	13	27	200	270	−70	.325	20
6	Milwaukee Wave	40	11	29	189	247	−58	.275	22

Source: RSSSF

== All-Star Game ==
On February 5 the defending champion, Canton Invaders, hosted the first ever AISA All-Star Game at the Canton Memorial Civic Center. The Invaders faced a team of all-stars from the rest of the league's teams. This gave the hosts a distinct advantage, because unlike their opponent, they had been playing together all season. This was never more evident than in the fact that Canton scored the final seven goals of the match to pull away, 9–4. Canton forward Ian Anderson (1 goal, 2 assists) was named the game's MVP. Additionally the league announced that Toledo would join the league next season along with three to five others teams.

=== All-Star selections ===
- Head Coach: Keith Tozer, Louisville
- Asst. Coach: Chris Bartels, Kalamazoo

Starters	Pos	Reserves
Victor Petroni, Kalamazoo	G	Rick Schweizer, Louisville
Hayden Knight, Chicago; Tom Alioto, Louisville	D	Keith Tozer, Louisville; Dave Huson, Chicago; Paul Kato, Kalamazoo
Rubén Astigarraga, Columbus	M	Peter Knezic, Milwaukee; Lesh Shkreli, Columbus; Neil Ridgeway, Kalamazoo
Zoran Savic, Louisville; Ross Ongaro, Milwaukee	F	Gary Amlong, Louisville; Gerald Celestin, Columbus; Janusz Kieca, Chicago

=== Canton Invaders’ All-Stars ===
The following Canton players were also selected by their peers as all-stars, but because of the match format, played for the host team.

Pos	Player
G	Bill Naumovski, Canton
D	Oscar Pisano, Canton
D	Walt Schlothauer, Canton
M	Don Tobin, Canton
F	Kia Zolgharnain, Canton
F	Art Kramer, Canton

=== Match report ===
February 5, 1986
7:35pm EST

Canton Invaders	9–4	AISA All-Stars
Kia 7:52, 54:00, 56:20; Pikuzinski 12:03; Anderson 31:55; Kramer 34:24 (PP); Killingsworth 41:25; Frick 41:54, 59:47; 6th Foul; Naumovski		Knezic 10:42; Savic 25:04; Ongaro 26:50; Ridgeway 30:13; Huson (yellow card); 6th Foul; Shkreli

Canton Memorial Civic Center, Canton, Ohio
Attendance: 2,720

== Playoffs ==
Semifinals
1	Canton Invaders	14	5	3	–	–
4	Chicago Shoccers	7	3	2	–	–
2	Louisville Thunder	2	4	4	–	–
3	Kalamazoo Kangaroos	1	3	3	–	–

Finals
1	Canton Invaders	6	7	10	–	–
2	Louisville Thunder	3	3	5	–	–

== League Leaders ==
=== Scoring ===
Player	Team	GP	G	A	Pts
Zoran Savic	Canton	40	51	30	81
Ross Ongaro	Milwaukee	40	40	33	73
Kia Zolgharnain	Canton	37	52	15	67
Peter Knezic	Milwaukee	38	31	31	62
Chris Hellenkamp	Louisville	38	37	24	61
Ted Powers	Kalamazoo	40	42	17	59
Lesh Shkreli	Columbus	40	29	30	59
Don Tobin	Canton	30	19	39	58
Art Kramer	Canton	35	33	24	57
Mike Fall	Louisville	38	18	38	56

=== Goalkeeping ===
Player	Team	GP	Min	SA	SV	GA	GAA	W	L
Jamie Swanner	Canton	25	1485	785	407	88	3.55	20	3
Bill Naumovski	Canton	16	971	418	217	59	3.64	13	3
A. J. Lachowecki	Louisville	16	881	462	230	57	3.88	12	3
Victor Petroni	Kalamazoo	33	1979	1075	606	135	4.09	14	8
Jose Garcia	Chicago	22	1085	620	345	86	4.75	8	12

== League awards ==
- Most Valuable Player: Don Tobin, Canton
- Coach of the Year: Trevor Dawkins, Canton
- Defender of the Year: Oscar Pisano, Canton
- Goalkeeper of the Year: Victor Petroni, Kalamazoo
- Rookie of the Year: Jamie Swanner, Canton

== All-AISA Teams ==
First Team	Pos	Second Team
Victor Petroni, Kalamazoo	G	Jamie Swanner, Canton
Tim Tyma, Canton	D	Martin Rincon, Chicago
Oscar Pisano, Canton	D	Saeed Bakhtiari, Louisville
Don Tobin, Canton	M	Peter Knezic, Milwaukee
Zoran Savic, Louisville	F	Chris Hellenkamp, Louisville
Kia Zolgharnain, Canton	F	Ross Ongaro, Milwaukee
