= Fahmi El-Shami =

Libyan footballer (born 1964)

Personal information
- Full name: Fahmi El-Shami
- Date of birth: December 1964 (age 61)
- Place of birth: Benghazi, Libya
- Height: 6 ft 2 in (1.88 m)
- Position: Forward

Team information
- Current team: Columbia rush (President)
- Number: 10

Senior career*
Years	Team	Apps	(Gls)
1987–1988	San Diego Sockers (indoor)	3	(0)
1988	Canton Invaders (indoor)	27	(41)
1989	Hershey Impact (indoor)		(12)
1989–1990	Chicago Power (indoor)	11	(4)
1990–1992	Dayton Dynamo (indoor)	74	(81)
1992	Canton Invaders (indoor)	3	(6)
1993	Milwaukee Wave (indoor)	13	(8)
1997	Atlanta Ruckus	10	(5)
1998	Slavia Praha	20	(15)
Total		141	(157)

International career
1989-1991	Libya	14	(6)
- * Club domestic league appearances and goals

Fahmi El-Shami is a former Libyan soccer player who played in the NPSL, particularly as a forward.

== Career statistics ==
=== Club ===
Club	Season	League			Cup		Other		Total	
Club	Season	Division	Apps	Goals	Apps	Goals	Apps	Goals	Apps	Goals
San Diego Sockers	1987–88	MISL	3	9	0	0	0	0	3	0
Canton Invaders	1988–89	AISA	27	27	0	0	0	0	30	30
Chicago Power	1989–90	AISA	11	4	0	0	0	0	12	4
Dayton Dynamo	1990–91	NPSL	38	43	1	1	0	0	38	43
Dayton Dynamo	1991–92	NPSL	36	38	0	0	0	0	36	38
Dayton Dynamo	Total		74	87	0	0	0	0	74	81
Canton Invaders	1992–93	NPSL	3	0	0	0	0	0	3	0
Milwaukee Wave	1992–93	NPSL	13	8	0	0	0	0	13	8
Atlanta Ruckus	1997	USISL A-League	10	0	0	0	0	0	0	
Career total			141	117	1	1	0	0	141	127
