= Chris Pfau =

American soccer player, forward

Personal information
- Date of birth: March 31, 1967 (age 59)
- Place of birth: Fairfax, Virginia, U.S.
- Position: Forward

College career
| Years | Team | Apps | (Gls) |
| 1986–1988 | Old Dominion Monarchs | | |

Senior career*
| Years | Team | Apps | (Gls) |
| 1989–1991 | Canton Invaders (indoor) | 74 | (41) |
| 1991–1995 | Dayton Dynamo (indoor) | 128 | (86) |
| 1995 | Cincinnati Silverbacks (indoor) | 7 | (1) |
| 1996 | Canton Invaders (indoor) | 14 | (7) |
| 1998 | Cincinnati Riverhawks | 3 | (0) |
| Total | | 226 | (135) |

Managerial career
- 2000–2001: Mount Marty University (men)
- 2002: Saint Mary's College (women)
- 2005-2007: Evansville Purple Aces (women)
- 2008–2011: Akron Zips (women)
- 2013–2016: Houston Cougars (women)
- 2020–: Evansville Purple Aces (women)
- * Club domestic league appearances and goals

Chris Pfau is an American former soccer player who played in the NPSL.

== Career statistics ==
=== Club ===
| Club | Season | League | | | Cup | | Other | | Total | |
| Club | Season | Division | Apps | Goals | Apps | Goals | Apps | Goals | Apps | Goals |
|---|---|---|---|---|---|---|---|---|---|---|
| Canton Invaders | 1989–90 | American Indoor Soccer Association | 37 | 20 | 0 | 0 | 0 | 0 | 37 | 20 |
| Canton Invaders | 1990–91 | NPSL | 37 | 21 | 0 | 0 | 0 | 0 | 37 | 21 |
| Canton Invaders | Total | | 74 | 41 | 0 | 0 | 0 | 0 | 74 | 41 |
| Dayton Dynamo | 1991–92 | NPSL | 34 | 23 | 0 | 0 | 0 | 0 | 34 | 23 |
| Dayton Dynamo | 1992–93 | NPSL | 32 | 19 | 0 | 0 | 0 | 0 | 32 | 19 |
| Dayton Dynamo | 1993–94 | NPSL | 40 | 38 | 0 | 0 | 0 | 0 | 40 | 38 |
| Dayton Dynamo | 1994–95 | NPSL | 22 | 6 | 0 | 0 | 0 | 0 | 22 | 6 |
| Dayton Dynamo | Total | | 128 | 86 | 0 | 0 | 0 | 0 | 128 | 86 |
| Cincinnati Silverbacks | 1995–96 | NPSL | 7 | 1 | 0 | 0 | 0 | 0 | 7 | 1 |
| Canton Invaders | 1995–96 | NPSL | 14 | 7 | 0 | 0 | 0 | 0 | 14 | 7 |
| Cincinnati Riverhawks | 1998 | USISL A-League | 3 | 0 | 0 | 0 | 0 | 0 | 3 | 0 |
| Career total | | | 226 | 135 | 0 | 0 | 0 | 0 | 226 | 135 |
