= 1989–90 American Indoor Soccer Association season =

American Indoor Soccer Association
- Season: 1989–90
- Champions: Canton Invaders; 5th title
- Matches: 160
- Goals: 1,627 (10.17 per match)
- Top goalscorer: Dan O'Keefe (62)

The 1989–90 American Indoor Soccer Association season was the sixth season for the league. Before the season, Atlanta was added, Ft. Wayne changed their name to Indiana, and Memphis changed their nickname to the Rogues. After the season, Indiana moved to Albany, New York. Because of mounting debt, on June 23, 1990, the AISA expelled Memphis from the league and repudiated its line of credit. After the season, the league also changed its name to the National Professional Soccer League.

== League Standings ==
=== American Division ===
Pos	Team	Pld	W	L	PF	PA	PD	PCT	GB
1	Canton Invaders	40	36	4	544	321	+223	.900	—
2	Atlanta Attack	40	23	17	438	389	+49	.575	13
3	Hershey Impact	40	19	21	397	384	+13	.475	17
4	Memphis Rogues	40	6	34	268	484	−216	.150	30

Source: RSSSF

=== National Division ===
Pos	Team	Pld	W	L	PF	PA	PD	PCT	GB
1	Dayton Dynamo	40	21	19	388	356	+32	.525	—
2	Milwaukee Wave	40	21	19	373	353	+20	.525	—
3	Chicago Power	40	20	20	377	388	−11	.500	1
4	Indiana Kick	40	14	26	373	483	−110	.350	7

Source: RSSSF

== All-Star Game ==
The Soviet Red Army team defeated the AISA All-Stars 10–8 in overtime on Oleg Sergeyev's goal 1:54 into the extra session. With one goal and two assists, Drago of the Hershey Impact was voted the MVP of the match by the attending media.

=== AISA All-Star roster ===
- Coach: Timo Liekoski, Canton
- Asst. Coach: John Dolinsky, Milwaukee

Starters	Pos	Reserves
Jamie Swanner, Canton	G	Jay McCutcheon, Chicago
Bret Hall, Chicago; Tim Tyma, Milwaukee	D	Oscar Pisano, Canton; Vince Beck, Memphis; Bob DiNunzio, Canton; Denzil Antonio, Canton; Mike Richardson, Chicago
Peter Hattrup, Atlanta; Drago, Hershey; Dan O'Keefe, Indiana	M/F	George Pastor, Milwaukee; Tony Bono, Dayton; Marcelo Carrera, Canton; Franklin McIntosh, Atlanta

=== Match report ===
January 20, 1990
2:00 PM CST

Soviet Red Army	10–8 (OT)	AISA All-Stars
Kuznetsov 25:35, 32:03; Korneev 38:35, 53:03; Sergeyev 61:54	report	Drago 11:46 (PK); Bono 26:32; Carrera 27:42; Hattrup 55:04

Joe Louis Arena, Detroit, Michigan
Attendance: 11,561

== Playoffs ==
First Round
4	Milwaukee Wave	8	8	–
5	Chicago Power	6	6	–
3	Atlanta Attack	13	13	–
6	Hershey Impact	10	9	–

Semifinals
1	Canton Invaders	10	12	–
4	Milwaukee Wave	4	4	–
2	Dayton Dynamo	2	8	13
3	Atlanta Attack	15	6	6

Finals
1	Canton Invaders	14	7	21	13	–
2	Dayton Dynamo	2	8	8	11	–

== League Leaders ==
=== Scoring ===
Player	Team	GP	G	A	Pts
Drago	Atlanta/Hershey	41	57	67	167
Rudy Pikuzinski	Canton	36	51	38	140
Peter Hattrup	Atlanta	40	48	43	135
Dan O'Keefe	Indiana	40	62	17	125
George Pastor	Milwaukee	39	51	29	119
Steve Frick	Canton	37	50	18	109
Nilton Batata	Chicago	37	32	41	104
Art Kramer	Milwaukee	40	41	27	101
Franklin McIntosh	Hershey/Atlanta	35	38	35	98
Tony Bono	Dayton	39	29	32	93

=== Goalkeeping ===
Player	Team	Min	PA	PAA	W	L
Jamie Swanner	Canton	2134	273	7.67	32	4
Pat Harrington	Dayton	980	131	8.00	10	6
Yaro Dachniwsky	Atlanta	1526	206	8.10	16	10

== League awards ==
- Most Valuable Player: Jamie Swanner, Canton
- Coach of the Year: Rick Schweizer, Dayton
- Defender of the Year: Bret Hall, Chicago
- Goalkeeper of the Year: Jamie Swanner, Canton
- Rookie of the Year: Brian Haynes, Atlanta

== All-AISA Teams ==
First Team	Pos	Second Team
Jamie Swanner, Canton	G	Carlos Pena, Dayton
Tim Tyma, Milwaukee	D	Bobby DiNunzio, Canton
Bret Hall, Chicago	D	Oscar Pisano, Canton
Peter Hattrup, Atlanta	M/F	Tony Bono, Dayton
Drago, Hershey	M/F	Dan O'Keefe, Indiana
Rudy Pikuzinski, Canton	M/F	Marcelo Carrera, Canton
