= 1987–88 American Indoor Soccer Association season =

American Indoor Soccer Association
- Season: 1987–88
- Champions: Canton Invaders; 3rd title
- Matches: 48
- Goals: 414 (8.63 per match)
- Top goalscorer: Rudy Pikuzinski (24)

The 1987–88 American Indoor Soccer Association season was the fourth season for the league. Only four teams (Canton, Fort Wayne, Memphis and Milwaukee) returned from the previous year, which made for a very brief, 24-game season that ended in early February. The 1988 All-Star game had been scheduled for Tampa Bay, but with the Rowdies leaving the league to play outdoors in the American Soccer League, and three other clubs (Chicago, Toledo and league-champion Louisville) folding, the game was canceled altogether.

Two expansion teams were set to join for the following season, Dayton and Jacksonville. Rather than have only a two-team battle in a championship playoff series, the league instead opted to stage a 12-match, unbalanced, round-robin tournament called the Challenge Cup Series to determine who took home the trophy for 1987–88. The two expansion teams were also invited to play in this unique season-ending event, despite never having previously faced AISA competition. This would also give league owners a chance to see if the two new teams were really ready for the AISA. The series commenced on February 14. As the six-week long tournament rolled on, the race for cup came down to the final game of the series on April 1, which happened to match league-leaders Canton and Fort Wayne. Both teams carried 8–3 records into match. Since the winner would secure the title by one game, it became a de facto championship final. Canton held on for a 5–4 victory, and their third AISA title in four seasons.

== League Standings ==
Pos	Team	Pld	W	L	GF	GA	GD	PCT	GB
1	Memphis Storm	24	16	8	104	94	+10	.667	—
2	Canton Invaders	24	12	12	108	97	+11	.500	4
3	Milwaukee Wave	24	11	13	103	111	−8	.458	5
4	Fort Wayne Flames	24	9	15	99	112	−13	.375	7

Source: RSSSF

== Challenge Cup ==
Pos	Team	Pld	W	L	GF	GA	GD	PCT	GB
1	Canton Invaders	12	9	3	67	55	+12	.750	—
2	Fort Wayne Flames	12	8	4	72	52	+20	.667	1
3	Milwaukee Wave	12	6	6	52	53	−1	.500	3
4	Jacksonville Generals	12	6	6	53	58	−5	.500	3
5	Memphis Storm	12	4	8	44	53	−9	.333	5
6	Dayton Dynamo	12	3	9	46	63	−17	.250	6

Source: RSSSF

=== de facto Challenge Cup final ===
April 1, 1988
7:35 PM CST

Fort Wayne Flames	4–5	Canton Invaders
Bodenstein 35:19; O’Keefe 36:38; Prescott 57:16; Hellencamp 59:00	report	Ru. Pikuzinski 13:51, 22:50; Skouras 19:31; Ra. Pikuzinski 23:55 (PP); Carrera 42:36

War Memorial Coliseum, Fort Wayne, Indiana
Attendance: 8,028

1987–88 AISA Challenge Cup Champions: Canton Invaders (8–4 record)

== League Leaders ==
=== Scoring ===
Player	Team	GP	G	A	Pts
Rudy Pikuzinski	Canton	23	24	18	42
Martín Vásquez	Memphis	23	17	19	36
George Pastor	Milwaukee	24	18	15	33
Ted Hantak	Memphis	22	21	10	31
Neil Ridgeway	Fort Wayne	22	19	11	30
Art Kramer	Canton	23	16	12	28
Steve Frick	Canton	19	20	5	25
Chris Hellenkamp	Fort Wayne	21	18	6	24
Dan O'Keefe	Fort Wayne	21	18	6	24
Paul DiBernardo	Fort Wayne	22	18	5	23
Carlos Salguero	Fort Wayne	21	11	12	23

=== Goalkeeping ===
Player	Team	GP	Min	SA	SV	GA	GAA	W	L
Manny Sanchez	Memphis	12	708	389	140	44	3.73	8	3
Yaro Dachniwsky	Memphis	11	598	278	124	38	3.82	6	5
Mark Berry	Milwaukee	6	386	270	96	27	4.19	4	2
Warren Lipka	Fort Wayne	14	804	418	207	58	4.33	7	6
Bill Naumovski	Canton	16	882	380	152	65	4.42	8	7

== League awards ==
- Most Valuable Player: Rudy Pikuzinski, Canton
- Coach of the Year: Terry Nicholl, Memphis
- Defender of the Year: Tim Tyma, Milwaukee
- Goalkeeper of the Year: Manny Sanchez, Memphis
- Rookie of the Year: Rod Castro, Memphis

== All-AISA Team ==
Player	Pos	Team
Manny Sanchez	G	Memphis
Tim Tyma	D	Milwaukee
Vince Beck	D	Memphis
Chris Hellenkamp	M	Fort Wayne
Ted Hantak	F	Memphis
Rudy Pikuzinski	F	Canton
