= 1988–89 American Indoor Soccer Association season =

American Indoor Soccer Association
- Season: 1988–89
- Champions: Canton Invaders; 4th title
- Matches: 140
- Goals: 1,253 (8.95 per match)
- Top goalscorer: Karl-Heinz Granitza (61)

The 1988–89 American Indoor Soccer Association season was the fifth season for the league. In the offseason, the league announced new scoring rules with goals being worth either 1, 2, or 3 points based on distance and/or game situation. Before the season, teams were added in Chicago and Hershey. During the season, the league took control of the Memphis Storm team on December 18 because the ownership had financial issues. After the season, the league announced that an expansion team based in Atlanta would join for 1989–90 season.

== League Standings ==
Pos	Team	Pld	W	L	PF	PA	PD	PCT	GB
1	Canton Invaders	40	25	15	454	368	+86	.625	—
2	Milwaukee Wave	40	24	16	377	355	+22	.600	1
3	Chicago Power	40	22	18	375	380	−5	.550	3
4	Hershey Impact	40	21	19	360	335	+25	.525	4
5	Fort Wayne Flames	40	20	20	337	299	+38	.500	5
6	Dayton Dynamo	40	14	26	328	410	−82	.350	11
7	Memphis Storm	40	14	26	303	387	−84	.350	11

Source: RSSSF

== Playoffs ==
Semifinals
1	Canton Invaders	14	5	–
4	Hershey Impact	8	0	–
2	Milwaukee Wave	12	14	4
3	Chicago Power	16	10	20

Finals
1	Canton Invaders	16	6	16	6	15
3	Chicago Power	8	8	7	22	9

== League Leaders ==
=== Scoring ===
Player	Team	GP	G	A	Pts
Karl-Heinz Granitza	Chicago	38	61	25	137
Rod Castro	Memphis	39	55	19	111
Rudy Pikuzinski	Canton	32	49	21	109
Art Kramer	Milwaukee	40	38	20	94
Franklin McIntosh	Hershey	34	36	26	92
Nilton Batata	Chicago	33	30	35	86
Marcelo Carrera	Canton	31	29	27	80
Zoran Savic	Milwaukee	36	31	21	79
Ricardo Alonso	Mem./Ft. W.	37	29	23	79
Steve Frick	Canton	31	29	18	75

=== Goalkeeping ===
Player	Team	GP	Min	SA	SV	PA	PAA	W	L
Otto Orf	Fort Wayne	25	1069	597	295	114	6.39	10	8
Arnie Mausser	Dayton	9	431	224	112	57	7.93	3	4
Scott Molfenter	Dayton	14	506	268	132	67	7.94	3	5
Warren Lipka	Fort Wayne	24	1216	634	285	164	8.01	10	10
Tony Pierce	Milwaukee	32	1756	964	442	235	8.03	17	13

== League awards ==
- Most Valuable Player: Rudy Pikuzinski, Canton
- Coach of the Year: John Dolinsky, Milwaukee
- Defender of the Year: Tim Tyma, Milwaukee
- Goalkeeper of the Year: Jamie Swanner, Canton
- Rookie of the Year: Carlos Pena, Dayton

== All-AISA Teams ==
First Team	Pos	Second Team
Jamie Swanner, Canton	G	Tony Pierce, Milwaukee
Tim Tyma, Milwaukee	D	Saeed Bakhtiari, Milwaukee
Bret Hall, Chicago	D	Randy Prescott, Fort Wayne
Charley Greene, Hershey	M	Franklin McIntosh, Hershey
Karl-Heinz Granitza, Chicago	F	Art Kramer, Milwaukee
Rudy Pikuzinski, Canton	F	Rod Castro, Memphis
