= 1992–93 National Professional Soccer League season =

National Professional Soccer League
- Season: 1992–93
- Champions: Kansas City Attack
- Matches: 260
- Top goalscorer: Hector Marinaro (100)
- Highest attendance: 16,410 Milwaukee – St. Louis (March 20)
- Average attendance: 5,123

The 1992–93 National Professional Soccer League season was the ninth season for the league. Also this was the first year for the NPSL being the top level of professional indoor soccer.

== League Standings ==
=== American Division ===
| Pos | Team | Pld | W | L | PF | PA | PD | PCT | GB |
|---|---|---|---|---|---|---|---|---|---|
| 1 | Baltimore Spirit | 40 | 27 | 13 | 582 | 488 | +94 | .675 | — |
| 2 | Cleveland Crunch | 40 | 25 | 15 | 702 | 563 | +139 | .625 | 2 |
| 3 | Buffalo Blizzard | 40 | 23 | 17 | 570 | 503 | +67 | .575 | 4 |
| 4 | Harrisburg Heat | 40 | 22 | 18 | 597 | 556 | +41 | .550 | 5 |
| 5 | Dayton Dynamo | 40 | 20 | 20 | 562 | 584 | −22 | .500 | 7 |
| 6 | Detroit Rockers | 40 | 16 | 24 | 566 | 666 | −100 | .400 | 11 |
| 7 | Canton Invaders | 40 | 13 | 27 | 519 | 634 | −115 | .325 | 14 |

Source: RSSSF

=== National Division ===
| Pos | Team | Pld | W | L | PF | PA | PD | PCT | GB |
|---|---|---|---|---|---|---|---|---|---|
| 1 | Wichita Wings | 40 | 27 | 13 | 587 | 435 | +152 | .675 | — |
| 2 | Kansas City Attack | 40 | 26 | 14 | 657 | 555 | +102 | .650 | 1 |
| 3 | Chicago Power | 40 | 22 | 18 | 483 | 514 | −31 | .550 | 5 |
| 4 | St. Louis Ambush | 40 | 19 | 21 | 582 | 610 | −28 | .475 | 8 |
| 5 | Milwaukee Wave | 40 | 17 | 23 | 513 | 509 | +4 | .425 | 10 |
| 6 | Denver Thunder | 40 | 3 | 37 | 439 | 742 | −303 | .075 | 24 |

Source: RSSSF

== Playoffs ==
Quarterfinals
A1 | Baltimore Spirit | 3 | 9 | –
A4 | Harrisburg Heat | 16 | 22 | –
American Division
A2 | Cleveland Crunch | 13 | 12 | 13
A3 | Buffalo Blizzard | 20 | 6 | 6
N1 | Wichita Wings | 15 | 16 | –
N4 | St. Louis Ambush | 17 | 18 | –
National Division
N2 | Kansas City Attack | 9 | 14 | –
N3 | Chicago Power | 8 | 10 | –

Semifinals
A4 | Harrisburg Heat | 15 | 20 | 7
A2 | Cleveland Crunch | 16 | 18 | 16
N4 | St. Louis Ambush | 17 | 15 | 14
N2 | Kansas City Attack | 21 | 4 | 16

Finals
A2 | Cleveland Crunch | 6 | 8 | 17 | 19 | 7
N2 | Kansas City Attack | 18 | 12 | 12 | 16 | 19

== League Leaders ==
=== Scoring ===
| Player | Team | GP | G | A | Pts |
|---|---|---|---|---|---|
| Hector Marinaro | Cleveland | 38 | 100 | 50 | 248 |
| Zoran Karić | Cleveland | 33 | 78 | 72 | 222 |
| Gino DiFlorio | Canton | 40 | 81 | 28 | 178 |
| Rudy Pikuzinski | Buffalo | 39 | 67 | 36 | 165 |
| Jon Parry | Kansas City | 40 | 66 | 27 | 161 |
| Franklin McIntosh | Harrisburg | 40 | 56 | 51 | 157 |
| Sean Bowers | Detroit | 40 | 59 | 39 | 156 |
| Brian Haynes | Kansas City | 40 | 57 | 27 | 144 |
| Goran Hunjak | Baltimore | 39 | 53 | 46 | 141 |
| Kia | Canton | 35 | 62 | 32 | 136 |

=== Goalkeeping ===
| Player | Team | Min | PA | PAA | W | L |
|---|---|---|---|---|---|---|
| Kris Peat | Wichita | 1772 | 306 | 10.36 | 22 | 8 |
| Cris Vaccaro | Baltimore | 1994 | 373 | 11.22 | 23 | 11 |
| Victor Nogueira | Milwaukee | 1692 | 322 | 11.42 | 15 | 15 |
| Jamie Swanner | Buffalo | 2293 | 469 | 12.27 | 22 | 16 |
| Otto Orf | Cleveland | 2032 | 426 | 12.58 | 25 | 9 |
| Carlos Pena | Dayton | 2157 | 493 | 13.71 | 20 | 16 |
| Jeff Robben | St. Louis | 1642 | 390 | 14.25 | 12 | 16 |
| Frank Arlasky | Canton | 1466 | 384 | 15.71 | 9 | 14 |
| Bryan Finnerty | Detroit | 2336 | 617 | 15.85 | 14 | 23 |

== League awards ==
- Most Valuable Player: Hector Marinaro, Cleveland
- Defender of the Year: Kim Røntved, Wichita
- Rookie of the Year: Brett Phillips, Harrisburg
- Goalkeeper of the Year: Cris Vaccaro, Baltimore
- Coach of the Year: Zoran Savic, Kansas City

== All-NPSL Teams ==
| First Team | Pos | Second Team | Third Team |
|---|---|---|---|
| Cris Vaccaro, Baltimore | G | Kris Peat, Wichita | Jamie Swanner, Buffalo |
| Kim Røntved, Wichita; Sean Bowers, Detroit | D | Terry Woodberry, Wichita; George Fernandez, Cleveland | Daryl Doran, St. Louis; Denzil Antonio, Canton; Doug Neely, Baltimore |
| Hector Marinaro, Cleveland; Zoran Karić, Cleveland; Rudy Pikuzinski, Buffalo | F | Pato Margetic, Chicago; Jon Parry, Kansas City; Goran Hunjak, Baltimore | Franklin McIntosh, Harrisburg; Randy Pikuzinski, Buffalo; Gino DiFlorio, Canton |

== All-Rookie Teams ==
| First Team | Pos | Second Team |
|---|---|---|
| Brett Phillips, Harrisburg | G | Nat Gonzalez, Wichita |
| Jason Dieter, Baltimore; Denis Hamlett, Harrisburg; Eric Dade, Baltimore | D | Brian Enge, Wichita; Ed Carmean, Kansas City |
| Eric Eichmann, Wichita; Barry Stitz, Baltimore; Andy Crawford, Denver | F | Scott Gaither, Detroit; Dave Reichart, Wichita; Joey Murtagh, Baltimore |
