= 1990–91 National Professional Soccer League season =

National Professional Soccer League
- Season: 1990–91
- Champions: Chicago Power
- Matches: 180
- Top goalscorer: Andy Chapman (77)
- Average attendance: 3,494

The 1990–91 National Professional Soccer League season was the seventh season for the league and first under the name National Professional Soccer League. Teams were added in Detroit, Rockford, Illinois and Albany, New York.

== League standings ==
=== American Division ===
| Pos | Team | Pld | W | L | PF | PA | PD | PCT | GB |
|---|---|---|---|---|---|---|---|---|---|
| 1 | Canton Invaders | 40 | 28 | 12 | 551 | 436 | +115 | .700 | — |
| 2 | Atlanta Attack | 40 | 25 | 15 | 544 | 401 | +143 | .625 | 3 |
| 3 | Detroit Rockers | 40 | 22 | 18 | 567 | 474 | +93 | .550 | 6 |
| 4 | Hershey Impact | 40 | 19 | 21 | 491 | 514 | −23 | .475 | 9 |
| 5 | New York Kick | 40 | 3 | 37 | 284 | 646 | −362 | .075 | 25 |

Source: RSSSF

=== National Division ===
| Pos | Team | Pld | W | L | PF | PA | PD | PCT | GB |
|---|---|---|---|---|---|---|---|---|---|
| 1 | Chicago Power | 40 | 23 | 17 | 507 | 471 | +36 | .575 | — |
| 2 | Milwaukee Wave | 40 | 23 | 17 | 453 | 404 | +49 | .575 | — |
| 3 | Dayton Dynamo | 40 | 21 | 19 | 465 | 489 | −24 | .525 | 2 |
| 4 | Illinois Thunder | 40 | 16 | 24 | 480 | 507 | −27 | .400 | 7 |

Source: RSSSF

== Playoffs ==
First round
3 | Atlanta Attack | 6 | 16 | –
6 | Dayton Dynamo | 11 | 17 | –
4 | Milwaukee Wave | 9 | 10 | 10
5 | Detroit Rockers | 14 | 9 | 23

Semifinals
1 | Canton Invaders | 10 | 16 | 6
6 | Dayton Dynamo | 15 | 12 | 15
2 | Chicago Power | 14 | 8 | –
5 | Detroit Rockers | 9 | 5 | –

Finals
6 | Dayton Dynamo | 0 | 4 | 10 | – | –
2 | Chicago Power | 12 | 8 | 12 | – | –

== League leaders ==
=== Scoring ===
| Player | Team | GP | G | A | Pts |
|---|---|---|---|---|---|
| Andy Chapman | Detroit | 40 | 77 | 37 | 180 |
| Pato Margetic | Chicago | 39 | 37 | 80 | 149 |
| Gino DiFlorio | Canton | 39 | 62 | 26 | 143 |
| Mirko Castillo | Chicago | 31 | 63 | 27 | 140 |
| Zoran Savic | Atlanta | 38 | 56 | 32 | 135 |
| Dan O'Keefe | Detroit | 38 | 73 | 10 | 130 |
| Dennis Brose | Dayton | 40 | 62 | 22 | 128 |
| John Abe | Hershey | 39 | 44 | 40 | 114 |
| Franklin McIntosh | Atlanta/Hershey | 41 | 48 | 31 | 114 |
| George Pastor | Milwaukee | 40 | 52 | 21 | 113 |

=== Goalkeeping ===
| Player | Team | Min | PA | PAA | W | L |
|---|---|---|---|---|---|---|
| Tony Pierce | Milwaukee | 1214 | 187 | 9.24 | 14 | 5 |
| A. J. Lachowski | Atlanta | 1573 | 245 | 9.34 | 15 | 12 |
| Felipe Hernandez | Milwaukee | 1154 | 190 | 9.88 | 9 | 12 |
| Jamie Swanner | Canton | 2159 | 382 | 10.61 | 25 | 9 |
| Mark Berry | Chicago | 1577 | 279 | 10.61 | 16 | 6 |
| Yaro Dachniwsky | Atlanta | 803 | 143 | 10.69 | 10 | 3 |
| Bryan Finnerty | Detroit | 1397 | 252 | 10.82 | 14 | 10 |

== League awards ==
- Most Valuable Player: Andy Chapman, Detroit
- Defender of the Year: Denzil Antonio, Canton
- Rookie of the Year: Jay Rensink, Chicago, and Bryan Finnerty, Detroit
- Goalkeeper of the Year: Jamie Swanner, Canton
- Coach of the Year: Pato Margetic, Chicago, and Brian Tinnion, Detroit

== All-NPSL teams ==
| First Team | Pos | Second Team |
|---|---|---|
| Jamie Swanner, Canton | G | Tony Pierce, Milwaukee |
| Denzil Antonio, Canton | D | Bret Hall, Chicago |
| Arturo Velazco, Milwaukee | D | Michael Richardson, Chicago |
| Pato Margetic, Chicago | M/F | Tony Bono, Dayton |
| Andy Chapman, Detroit | M/F | Mirko Castillo, Chicago |
| Gino DiFlorio, Canton | M/F | Zoran Savic, Atlanta |
