= 1991–92 National Professional Soccer League season =

National Professional Soccer League
- Season: 1991–92
- Champions: Detroit Rockers
- Matches: 180
- Top goalscorer: Teddy Kraft (70)
- Average attendance: 3,617

The 1991–92 National Professional Soccer League season was the eighth season for the league.

== League Standings ==
=== American Division ===
Pos	Team	Pld	W	L	PF	PA	PD	PCT	GB
1	Canton Invaders	40	24	16	476	447	+29	.600	—
2	Harrisburg Heat	40	24	16	547	462	+85	.600	—
3	Detroit Rockers	40	22	18	542	485	+57	.550	2
4	Dayton Dynamo	40	9	31	479	593	−114	.225	15

Source: RSSSF

=== National Division ===
Pos	Team	Pld	W	L	PF	PA	PD	PCT	GB
1	Chicago Power	40	30	10	524	439	+85	.750	—
2	Kansas City Attack	40	26	14	630	473	+157	.650	4
3	Illinois Thunder	40	20	20	496	523	−27	.500	10
4	Milwaukee Wave	40	18	22	453	534	−81	.450	12
5	Tulsa Ambush	40	7	33	452	643	−191	.175	23

Source: RSSSF

== Playoffs ==
Quarterfinals
4	Harrisburg Heat	12	8	–
5	Detroit Rockers	19	16	–
3	Kansas City Attack	9	23	6
6	Illinois Thunder	24	6	2

Semifinals
1	Chicago Power	8	18	3
5	Detroit Rockers	18	7	19
2	Canton Invaders	6	16	13
3	Kansas City Attack	17	14	7

Finals
5	Detroit Rockers	8	16	14	10	14
2	Canton Invaders	14	17	10	1	8

== League Leaders ==
=== Scoring ===
Player	Team	GP	G	A	Pts
Dan O'Keefe	Detroit	40	67	27	144
Brian Haynes	Kansas City	40	54	34	141
Michael Richardson	Chicago	39	47	36	130
Franklin McIntosh	Harrisburg	36	43	49	130
Andy Chapman	Detroit	35	61	22	129
Eloy Salgado	Tulsa	39	47	39	128
Teddy Kraft	Chicago	38	70	12	123
Kia	Canton	38	60	25	122
Matt Knowles	Illinois	40	45	32	121
Joey Kirk	Milwaukee	40	50	28	121

=== Goalkeeping ===
Player	Team	Min	PA	PAA	W	L
Russ Prince	Chicago	1517	261	10.32	21	5
Joe Malla	Harrisburg	1729	309	10.72	19	10
Jamie Swanner	Canton	2356	426	10.85	24	16
Scoop Stanisic	Illinois	1359	249	10.99	13	10
Warren Westcoat	Kansas City	1252	235	11.26	13	7
Frank Arlasky	Kansas City	1078	206	11.47	12	6
Bryan Finnerty	Dallas	2276	441	11.63	22	17
Jim St. Andre	Milwaukee	1130	235	12.48	8	14

== League awards ==
- Most Valuable Player: Jamie Swanner, Canton
- Defender of the Year: Matt Knowles, Illinois
- Rookie of the Year: Sean Bowers, Detroit
- Goalkeeper of the Year: Jamie Swanner, Canton
- Coach of the Year: Jim Pollihan, Harrisburg

== All-NPSL Teams ==
First Team	Pos	Second Team
Jamie Swanner, Canton	G	Russ Prince, Chicago
Matt Knowles, Illinois	D	Denzil Antonio, Canton
Bret Hall, Chicago	D	Gino Schiraldi, Kansas City
Michael Richardson, Chicago	M	Franklin McIntosh, Harrisburg
Dan O'Keefe, Detroit	F	Pato Margetic, Chicago
Brian Haynes, Kansas City	F	Eloy Salgado, Tulsa

== All-Rookie Teams ==
First Team	Pos	Second Team
Joe Mallia, Harrisburg	G	David Wulff, Tulsa
Mike Gosselin, Canton	D	Scott Cannon, Harrisburg
Sean Bowers, Detroit	D	Troy Edwards, Illinois
Jason Maricle, Tulsa	M	Kevin Koetters, Kansas City
Ken Snow, Chicago	F	Mark Pulisic, Harrisburg
Clark Brisson, Canton	F	Tim Ernst, Detroit
