= Lesh Shkreli =

Yugoslav footballer

Personal information
- Date of birth: January 6, 1957 (age 69)
- Place of birth: Ulcinj, PR Montenegro, Yugoslavia
- Position: Forward

Youth career
- Red Star Belgrade

Senior career*
Years	Team	Apps	(Gls)
1979–1980	Detroit Express (indoor)	10	(0)
1980	Detroit Express	2	(0)
1981	New York Eagles	25	(7)
1982	Oklahoma City Slickers		
1983	Pennsylvania Stoners		
1984	Houston Dynamos		
1984–1986	Columbus Capitals (indoor)	79	(88)
1986–1987	Toledo Pride (indoor)	17	(9)
1987–1988	Canton Invaders (indoor)		
1988–1989	Dayton Dynamo (indoor)		

Managerial career
- 1986: Columbus Capitals (interim)
- 1998–: Ohio Dominican University (assistant)
- 2003–2004: Columbus Shooting Stars
- * Club domestic league appearances and goals

Lesh Shkreli (born January 6, 1957) is a retired Montenegrin soccer forward who played in Yugoslavia, Greece and the United States. He led the American Indoor Soccer Association in scoring in 1984-1985, earning MVP honors.

Shkreli is Albanian ethnic origin, more precisely of the Shkreli subgroup of Albanians who are a minority in coastal Montenegro.

== Playing career ==
Shkreli began his career in the Red Star Belgrade youth system. At some point in his career he played in the Greek First Division. In 1980, Shkreli signed with the Detroit Express in the North American Soccer League (NASL). The Express was sold at the end of the 1980-1981 indoor season and moved to Washington D.C. where it became the Washington Diplomats. Shkreli did not make the move. In 1982, Shkreli played for the Oklahoma City Slickers in the American Soccer League. In the summer of 1984, he played for the Houston Dynamos in the United Soccer League. In 1984, he signed with the Columbus Capitals of the American Indoor Soccer Association (AISA). He led the league in scoring with fifty-nine goals in forty games, earning first team All Star and league MVP recognition. The Capitals folded at the end of the 1985-1986 season and the Toledo Pride picked up Shkreli in the dispersal draft. He played only seventeen games with the Pride before his contract was purchased by the Canton Invaders on January 15, 1987. Shkreli moved to the Dayton Dynamo for the 1988-1989 season. On September 19, 1989, the Dynamo traded him to the Chicago Power in exchange for Victor Quni. Shkreli declined to sign with the Power and retired.

== Coaching career ==
Shkreli was actively involved in coaching even as a player. In 1986, he served as an interim head coach for the Columbus Capitals for three games. In 1998, he became the assistant coach at Ohio Dominican University. In 2003, Shkreli became the first head coach of the Columbus Shooting Stars of the fourth division Premier Development League. Blast FC, a premier soccer club, was started in 1986 by Lesh Shkreli. It has been in existence for over 20 years and is presently the longest running soccer club in central Ohio. Lesh Shkreli is the full-time Director of Coaching at Blast F.C. He has led teams to the National League as well as the US Youth Soccer National Championships. Numerous teams of his compete at the Midwest Regional League (MRL) level.
