= Chuck Codd =

American soccer player

Personal information
- Full name: Charles Codd
- Date of birth: c. 1967 (age 58–59)
- Place of birth: Torrance, California, United States
- Position: Defender

Team information
- Current team: Baylor Lady Bears (assistant)

College career
Years	Team	Apps	(Gls)
1985–1989	NC State Wolfpack		

Senior career*
Years	Team	Apps	(Gls)
1988	F.C. Portland		
1991–1995	Chicago Power (indoor)	144	(43)
1995–1996	Cincinnati Silverbacks (indoor)	11	(2)
1996–1997	Buffalo Blizzard (indoor)	40	(5)
1997–1998	Chicago Stingers		
1998	→ Chicago Fire (loan)	0	(0)
1999–2000	→ Chicago Sockers		

Managerial career
- 1999–2000: Northwestern men (assistant)
- 2001–2003: Northwestern women (assistant)
- 2007: Northern Illinois Huskies (assistant)
- 2008–: Baylor Lady Bears (assistant)
- * Club domestic league appearances and goals

Chuck Codd (born in Torrance, California) is a former U.S. soccer defender who played one season in the Western Soccer Alliance, six in the National Professional Soccer League, two in the USISL and two in the USL PDL. He is currently the assistant coach of the Baylor University women's soccer team.

== Youth ==
Codd began playing with the Fram Culver Club in Torrance, California, in addition to playing soccer at South Torrance High School. Codd graduated from high school in 1985, entering North Carolina State that fall. He played four season on the NC State soccer team before graduating in 1990 with a bachelor's degree in history. While still in college, Codd spent the 1988 collegiate off season with F.C. Portland in the Western Soccer Alliance.

== Professional ==
In 1991, the Buffalo Blizzard of the National Professional Soccer League (NSPL) drafted Codd but immediately traded him, along with Russ Prince and Ko Thandabouth, to the Chicago Power in exchange for Randy Pikuzinski. He remained with the Power until the 1995–1996 season when he was traded to the Cincinnati Silverbacks after two games. Codd finished the 1995–1996 season in Cincinnati, but moved to the Buffalo Blizzard for the 1996–1997 season. In the spring of 1997, Codd returned to Chicago to sign with the Chicago Stingers of the USISL. In 1998, Codd was called up to the Chicago Fire of Major League Soccer, but did not enter a game. The Stingers won the 1998 USISL D-3 Pro League championship, but moved to the amateur fourth division USL PDL in 1999, changing the team name to the Chicago Sockers. The Sockers won the 1999 and 2000 titles. Codd scored one goal in the Sockers 3–1 victory over the Spokane Shadow for the 1999 PDL championship. He retired from following the 2000 season.

== Coaching ==
Codd has held numerous coaching positions over the years. He coached the St. Charles Celtics amateur club for three years. He also spent one season at one of several St. Charles High School's in St. Charles, Illinois. In 1999, he was hired as an assistant coach with the Northwestern University men's soccer team. In 2001, he moved to the women's team as an assistant coach, holding that position for three seasons. Codd coached with the Tophats girls club in Atlanta, Georgia, for two years before returning to the Midwest where he joined the Chicago Sockers as the director of the club's girls team. On January 30, 2007, Codd became an assistant coach with Northern Illinois University (NIU). When Marci Jobson, head coach of NIU, moved to Baylor University to coach the women's team, Codd moved with her, becoming the new assistant coach at Baylor on January 8, 2008.

== Personal ==
Codd married Canada women's national soccer team player Charmaine Hooper on July 22, 2002 They have a daughter named Charlie.
