= Marcos Lugris =

Puerto Rican footballer

Mark " Marcos" Lugris
Personal information
- Full name: Mark Lugris
- Date of birth: January 1, 1962 (age 64)
- Place of birth: Bronx, New York, United States
- Height: 1.75 m (5 ft 9 in)
- Position: Midfielder

College career
Years	Team	Apps	(Gls)
1979–1982	Fordham Rams	53+	(15)

Senior career*
Years	Team	Apps	(Gls)
1983	New York Cosmos	0	(0)
1984–1986	Houston Dynamos	35	(3)
1984–1986	Columbus Capitals (indoor)	84	(42)
1986–1987	Fort Wayne Flames (indoor)	42	(11)
1987–1989	Dallas Sidekicks (indoor)	22+	(3+)
1988–1989	Dayton Dynamo (indoor)	18	(2)
1990	Toronto Italia	12	(0)
1990	New York Kick (indoor)	9	(1)
1992	New York Hota Bavarians	20	(1)
1992–1995	Canton Invaders (indoor)	57	(15)
1992–1993	New York Pancyprian-Freedoms	22	(0)
1994	Carolina Vipers (indoor)	24	(7)
1998	Gigantes de Carolina		

International career
1983–1998	Puerto Rico	21	(5)
- * Club domestic league appearances and goals

Mark 'Marcos' Lugris (born January 1, 1962) is a former Puerto Rican football player. He played his professional club football mostly in the United States. Mark debuted for Puerto Rico on June 17, 1983, in a Pan American Games Qualifier vs Surinam at Sixto Escobar Stadium in San Juan. He represented Puerto Rico in the 1990-94-98 FIFA World Cup Qualifying. Lugris was captain of the PRMSNT from 1992 to 1998. Lugris also represented Puerto Rico in 4 Caribbean Shell Cups 93-94-95-98. In 1993 Shell Cup was the first and last time that Puerto Rico qualified for the group finals in Jamaica by winning its preliminary group in Guyana. That year in May Puerto Rico attained its highest FIFA world ranking (93rd)in its history. The first qualification match of World Cup 94 USA was between Dominican Republic and Puerto Rico, played on 21 March 1992, and the Puerto Rican defender Marcos Lugris scored the first goal in qualification.In 1995 Lugris was inducted in the Fordham University Athletic Hall of Fame. In 1998 vs Haiti in Port-au-Prince, Lugris played his final match for the National team. In 2014, Lugris was inducted in the Puerto Rican Soccer Hall of Fame. On April 5, 2018, Mark was announced as the Guest Honoree for the 5th Annual FutBoricua.Net Awards Gala in San Juan, Puerto Rico. At the Gala he was presented with the "Premio Cronica Joe Serralta" for his lifetime achievements with the Puerto Rican National team. In 2020, FutbolBoricua.Net announced its Historic Puerto Rico All Time Best XI Team (El mejor XI en la historia de Puerto Rico), Lugris was named to this team along with his teammates Roberto "Boy" Santana, Wilfredo " Cobre" Vinas and Chris Armas. On April 17, 2022, the International Federation of Football History and Statistics, named Lugris to its "Mens All Time Puerto Rico Dream Team".

== Career statistics ==
=== International ===
National team	Year	Apps	Goals
Puerto Rico	1992	4	1
Puerto Rico	1993	5	2
Puerto Rico	1994	2	0
Puerto Rico	1995	3	1
Puerto Rico	1996	2	1
Puerto Rico	1997	0	0
Puerto Rico	1998	2	0
Total		18	5

=== International goals ===
Scores and results list Puerto Rico's goal tally first.

No	Date	Venue	Opponent	Score	Result	Competition
1.	21 March 1992	Estadio Olímpico Félix Sánchez, Santo Domingo, Dominican Republic	Dominican Republic	1–0	2–1	1994 FIFA World Cup qualification
2.	14 March 1993	Bourda, Georgetown, Guyana	Guyana	4–0	4–0	1993 Caribbean Cup qualification
3.	21 May 1993	Independence Park, Kingston, Jamaica	Sint Maarten	?–?	3–0	1993 Caribbean Cup
4.	23 May 1995	Estadio Pedro Marrero, Havana, Cuba	Dominican Republic	1–2	1–3	1995 Caribbean Cup
5.	23 May 1995	Complejo Deportivo Efrain Carcaño Alicea, Bayamón, Puerto Rico	Saint Vincent and the Grenadines	1–2	1–2	1998 FIFA World Cup qualification
