= Walter Schlothauer =

American soccer player and coach

Wally
Personal information
- Full name: Walter Schlothauer
- Date of birth: September 24, 1958 (age 68)
- Place of birth: Mentor, Ohio, United States
- Positions: Forward; defender

Youth career
- 1975–1976: Mentor High School

College career
Years	Team	Apps	(Gls)
1976–1979	Cleveland State		

Senior career*
Years	Team	Apps	(Gls)
1980	Cleveland Cobras	22	(7)
1980–1981	Cleveland Force (indoor)	28	(6)
1981–1982	Detroit Express	30	(8)
1981–1982	Tulsa Roughnecks (indoor)	18	(6)
1983	Pennsylvania Stoners		
1984–1985	Houston Dynamos		
1984–1985	Columbus Capitals (indoor)		
1985–1988	Canton Invaders (indoor)	91	(38)
1992–1993	Cleveland Crunch (indoor)	17	(1)
- * Club domestic league appearances and goals

Wally is a retired U.S. soccer player and coach. He played in several outdoor and indoor leagues. In 1980, he was the American Soccer League Rookie of the Year with the Cleveland Cobras.

Schlothauer attended Mentor High School where he holds the school's single game (5), season (23) and career (39) scoring records. He was a two time All State soccer player in 1976, was named a High School All American. While in high school, he was selected to the first U.S. U-19 team which went on a tour of Germany in October 1975. Schlothauer entered Cleveland State University in 1976, playing on the men's soccer team until 1979. He is third on the team's list of career assists leaders. In 1980, he signed with the Cleveland Cobras of the American Soccer League. Playing as a forward, he scored seven goals in 22 games, earning Rookie of the Year honors. In the fall of 1980, he signed with the Cleveland Force in the Major Indoor Soccer League. In 1981, he moved back to the ASL with the Detroit Express for two seasons and spent the intervening winter of 1981–82 playing a season of NASL indoor for the Tulsa Roughnecks. In 1983, he played for the Pennsylvania Stoners of the ASL. In 1984 and 1985, he played for the Houston Dynamos in the United Soccer League, and again spent the winter off-season playing indoors. This time for the American Indoor Soccer Association's Columbus Capitals. Schlothauer next joined the Canton Invaders also of the AISA beginning in late 1985. In 1986, Hungary hosted an eight team FIFA futsal tournament. The tournament, which included the United States, served as a test bed for FIFA's futsal rules. It laid the groundwork for the first FIFA Futsal World Cup in 1986. Schlothauer was part of the U.S. team at the 1986 test tournament, but took no part in the 1989 tournament. On January 29, 1993, Schlothauer signed with the Cleveland Crunch in the National Professional Soccer League. He played out the remainder of the season, seeing time in 17 games. That was his last season of professional soccer. However, in 2006, he is listed on a team roster in Beck's National Soccer League, a four team indoor league in Cleveland, Ohio.

Over the years, Wally has held numerous youth soccer coaching positions including the North Olmsted High School girls team, Olmsted Falls High School Women's team (2019–present), North FC, and Excalibur Premier Soccer Club.

Scholothauer is a member of the Mentor High School Hall of Fame and was inducted into the Ohio Youth Soccer Association Hall of Fame in 2007.
