= Tony Bono =

American soccer player (born 1963)

Personal information
- Full name: Anthony Bono
- Date of birth: November 20, 1963 (age 62)
- Place of birth: Philadelphia, Pennsylvania, U.S.
- Height: 5 ft 4 in (1.63 m)
- Positions: Midfielder; defender

College career
Years	Team	Apps	(Gls)
1981–1984	Drexel Dragons		

Senior career*
Years	Team	Apps	(Gls)
1985–1987	Minnesota Strikers (indoor)	55	(3)
1988	Chicago Sting (indoor)	10	(0)
1988	Houston Dynamos		
1988–1995	Dayton Dynamo (indoor)	258	(176)
1995	Cincinnati Silverbacks (indoor)	4	(3)
1995–1996	Chicago Power (indoor)	30	(27)
1996	Milwaukee Wave (indoor)	7	(1)
1996–1997	Philadelphia KiXX (indoor)	33	(23)
Total		397+	(233+)

Managerial career
- 1992: Dayton Dynamo
- 1995: Dayton Dynamo
- * Club domestic league appearances and goals

Anthony Bono is an American retired soccer player who played professionally in the Major Indoor Soccer League, American Indoor Soccer Association, National Professional Soccer League and Lone Star Soccer Alliance.

Bono graduated from Frankford High School, where he was a 1979 First-Team and 1980 Second-Team All-State soccer player. Bono then attended Drexel University, where he was a 1984 first-team All-American soccer player. In 1985, the Minnesota Strikers of the Major Indoor Soccer League drafted Bono in the third round. In December 1987, the Strikers waived Bono. On January 15, 1988, the Chicago Sting signed Bono to a ten-day contract. The Sting kept Bono on the roster until they folded at the end of the season. Bono then spent the summer season with the Houston Dynamos of the Lone Star Soccer Alliance. The Dynamos went to the championship game where they fell to Dallas Mean Green. In the fall of 1988, Bono signed with the Hershey Impact of the American Indoor Soccer Association but was traded to the Dayton Dynamo on November 2, 1988, for a second-round draft pick and cash. He remained with the Dynamo until 1996. In January 1995, Bono became head coach of the Dynamo. The team ownership made this decision because Bono had acted as head coach at the end of the 1991–1992 season and had suffered a season-ending knee injury earlier in the 1994–1995 season. During the 1995 off-season, the Dynamos moved to Cincinnati, Ohio to become the Cincinnati Silverbacks. On November 17, 1995, the Silverbacks traded Bono to the Chicago Power. On March 6, 1996, the Power sent Bono to the Milwaukee Wave. In June 1996, Bono moved to the Philadelphia Kixx.

In 2001, he was inducted into the Southeastern Pennsylvania Soccer Hall of Fame.
