= John Dolinsky =

Personal information
- Date of birth: May 21, 1954 (age 72)
- Place of birth: Kaiserlautern, West Germany
- Positions: Midfielder; defender

College career
Years	Team	Apps	(Gls)
1972–1975	Lewis Flyers		

Senior career*
Years	Team	Apps	(Gls)
1976	Chicago Cats	18	(4)
1978	Indianapolis Daredevils	19	(2)
1978–1980	Pittsburgh Spirit (indoor)	29	(17)
1981	Rochester Flash		
1980–1982	Buffalo Stallions (indoor)	49	(9)
1982	Kansas City Comets (indoor)	20	(4)
1982	Oklahoma City Slickers		
1983–1984	Dallas Americans		
1984–1986	Canton Invaders (indoor)	65	(38)
1985	Tulsa Tornados		
1985	Chicago Schwaben		
1986–1988	Milwaukee Wave (indoor)	51	(18)

Managerial career
- 1985: Tulsa Tornados
- 1987–1990: Milwaukee Wave
- 1991, 1992: Dayton Dynamo
- 1995: Chicago Power (assistant)
- 2004: Indiana Blast
- * Club domestic league appearances and goals

John Dolinsky is a German-American retired soccer player who played professionally in the Major Indoor Soccer League, American Soccer League, United Soccer League and American Indoor Soccer Association. He also coached in the American Indoor Soccer Association where he was the 1989 Coach of the Year.

== Player ==
=== College ===
Born in West Germany, Dolinsky grew up in Chicago, Illinois. He attended Lewis University where from 1972 to 1975 he was a four-year starter on the men's soccer team. He was a 1973 and 1974 Honorable Mention (third team) All American. He finished his collegiate career with 51 goals and 32 assists. Lewis University inducted Dolinsky into the school's Athletic Hall of Fame in 1985. He did not complete his degree before turning professional and returned to school in 1991.

=== Professional ===
In 1976, Dolinsky began his professional career with the Chicago Cats of the American Soccer League. In 1978, he played for the Indianapolis Daredevils, also of the ASL. That fall, he began his indoor career with the Pittsburgh Spirit of Major Indoor Soccer League. In 1980, the Spirit traded Dolinsky to the Buffalo Stallions. He began the 1981–1982 season with the Stallions, but was traded to the Kansas City Comets during the season. The Comets released him at the end of the season. In 1981, he played for the Rochester Flash of the American Soccer League. He was a first team All Star that season. In 1982, he moved to the Oklahoma City Slickers. In April 1983, he signed with the Dallas Americans. He continued to play for the Americans in 1984 when they played in the United Soccer League. In the fall of 1984, he signed with the Canton Invaders of the American Indoor Soccer Association. He played two seasons with the Invaders, winning the 1985 and 1986 titles before moving to the Milwaukee Wave in 1986. He returned to outdoor soccer in the summer of 1985 as a player/coach with the Tulsa Tornados of the USL. After the USL collapsed six games into the season, Dolinsky moved to Chicago where he played for Chicago Schwaben. He signed with the Milwaukee Wave in 1986 and played two seasons before retiring as a player.

== Coach ==
In January 1987, the Milwaukee Wave elevated Dolinsky to the position of player/coach. He coached the Wave through the 1989–1990 season. He was the 1989 AISA Coach of the Year. The Wave fired Dolinsky in June 1990. In February 1991, the Dayton Dynamo hired Dolinsky to coach the team for the remainder of the season. In the fall of 1991, he left the Dynamo to return to school, but came back in January 1992 to coach the team. He resigned a month later. In 1995, he became an assistant coach with the Chicago Power. In 2004, he briefly coached the Indiana Blast of the fourth division Premier Development League.

Dolinsky currently serves as a Staff Coach for the Chicago Fire Academy.

== Yearly Awards ==
- ASL All-Star Team: 1981
- AISA Coach of the Year: 1989
