= Gregg Willin =

American soccer player (born 1964)

Greg Willin
Personal information
- Date of birth: June 8, 1964 (age 62)
- Place of birth: Chicago, Illinois, United States
- Position: Defender

Senior career*
Years	Team	Apps	(Gls)
1982	Georgia Generals	?	(4)
1982–1985	Wichita Wings (indoor)	138	(27)
1984	Jacksonville Tea Men		
1986	Los Angeles Lazers (indoor)	17	(4)
1986–1988	Memphis Storm (indoor)	56	(26)
1988–1989	Milwaukee Wave (indoor)	33	(13)
1989	Tampa Bay Rowdies		
1989–1990	Wichita Wings (indoor)	62	(14)
1990–1992	Cleveland Crunch (indoor)	92	(29)
- * Club domestic league appearances and goals

Gregg Willin is an American former soccer defender who played professionally in the second and third American Soccer League and Major Indoor Soccer League.

Willin grew up in Evergreen Park, Illinois, a suburb of Chicago. In the spring of 1982, he turned professional out of high school with the Georgia Generals of the second American Soccer League. On September 15, 1982, Willin moved indoors with the Wichita Wings of the Major Indoor Soccer League, going to the playoff semifinals in 1983 and 1984. In 1984, Willin spent the summer season with the Jacksonville Tea Men of the United Soccer League. The Wings released Willin 1985. He had an unsuccessful trial with the Los Angeles Lazers in the fall of 1985. However, on February 8, 1986, the Lazers signed Willins to a ten-day contract after injuries decimated the team. The Lazers then extended the contract to the end of the season. On October 22, 1986, Willin signed with the expansion Memphis Storm of the American Indoor Soccer Association. He spent two seasons with the Storm before moving to the Milwaukee Wave for the 1988-1989 AISA season. He then spent the summer playing outdoors for the Tampa Bay Rowdies of the third American Soccer League. On September 16, 1989, the Atlanta Attack selected Willin in the AISA Expansion Draft. Willin signed with the Wichita Wings of the MISL instead. In 1990, he moved to the Cleveland Crunch for two seasons. In 1991, the Crunch lost in the championship series to the San Diego Sockers.
