= Tony Bono (disambiguation) =

Tony Bono may refer to:

- Tony Bono (musician), Former bassist of Whiplash and Into Another
- Tony Bono (soccer player), American soccer player
