= Joey Kirk =

American soccer player (born 1965)

Personal information
- Date of birth: August 21, 1965 (age 61)
- Place of birth: Santa Monica, California, United States
- Height: 5 ft 10 in (1.78 m)
- Position: Forward

College career
Years	Team	Apps	(Gls)
1983–1987	Cal State Northridge Matadors		

Senior career*
Years	Team	Apps	(Gls)
1987	California Kickers		
1988–1990	Wichita Wings (indoor)	56	(8)
1989	Los Angeles Heat		
1990	Ottawa Intrepid	20	(3)
1990–1993	Milwaukee Wave (indoor)	100	(100)
1993–1995	Detroit Rockers (indoor)	77	(80)
1994–1995	Milwaukee Rampage		
1995–1996	Chicago Power (indoor)	19	(18)
1996	St. Louis Ambush (indoor)		
1996	Sacramento Knights (indoor)	12	(10)
1997	Detroit Safari (indoor)	15	(13)
1997–1999	Philadelphia KiXX (indoor)	21	(11)
1999	Wichita Wings (indoor)	3	(1)

International career
1987–1988	United States	7	(0)
- * Club domestic league appearances and goals

Joey Kirk (born August 21, 1965, in Santa Monica, California) is a former U.S. soccer forward who spent most of his career playing indoor soccer. He earned seven caps with the U.S. national team in 1987 and 1988.

== College ==
Kirk attended Cal-State Northridge where he starred on the men's soccer team from 1983 to 1987. In 1987, he received Division II first team All American recognition and finished his career with 59 goals, a school record.

== Professional career ==
In 1987, Kirk joined the California Kickers of the Western Soccer Alliance (WSA) during the collegiate off season. The Kickers finished the season in last place with a 4–6 record. In 1988, the Wichita Wings of Major Indoor Soccer League drafted Kirk and he spent the next two seasons (1988–1990) with the team. In 1989, he spent the summer with the Los Angeles Heat of the WSA, now known as the Western Soccer League. In 1990, he joined the Ottawa Intrepid of the Canadian Soccer League. In 1990, Kirk moved from the Wings to the Milwaukee Wave of the National Professional Soccer League (NPSL). In the 1991–1992 season, he scored fifty goals in forty games for the Wave. Kirk began the 1993–1994 season with Milwaukee before being traded to the Detroit Rockers for Eloy Salgado in February 1993. He remained in Detroit through the 1994–1995 season.

While Kirk had concentrated on indoor soccer for several years, in 1994, he joined the expansion Milwaukee Rampage of USISL for the 1994 and 1995 outdoor seasons. In 1994, he scored twenty-four goals in eighteen games with the Rampage.

In 1995, Kirk moved to the Chicago Power of the NPSL. He was with them through at least February 1996. However, some time before the playoffs, the Power traded Kirk to the St. Louis Ambush.

In February 1996, Kirk was drafted by the Los Angeles Galaxy of Major League Soccer (MLS) in the sixth round (54th overall) of the Inaugural MLS Draft. However, he did not join the Galaxy until May because he was with the Ambush in the NPSL playoffs. Kirk was then injured in the playoffs and reported to the Galaxy unable to play. The Galaxy waived Kirk on May 6, 1996, without him seeing time in a game.

In August, Kirk signed with the Sacramento Knights of the Continental Indoor Soccer League (CISL). In 1997, he moved to the Detroit Safari of CISL, but the team and the league folded at the end of the season. That fall, Kirk moved to the Philadelphia KiXX of the NPSL. In the 1999 off season, the Wings purchased Kirk's contract from the KiXX.

== National team ==
Kirk earned his first cap with the U.S. national team in a June 12, 1987 loss to South Korea in Pusan. At the time Kirk had just finished college. His next game came in another loss, this time to Guatemala on January 10, 1988. Kirk's last game with the national team came in a scoreless tie with Ecuador on June 12, 1988.

In 1997, Kirk traveled with the U.S. Futsal team to the 1997 FIFUSA World Futsal Championship where the U.S. finished 20 out of 20 teams.

== Coaching ==
Since retiring from playing, Kirk has coached youth soccer with several clubs in California.

== Recognition ==
Kirk was inducted into the Cal State Northridge Matadors Hall of Fame in July 2016.
