= Eloy Salgado =

American soccer player (born 1970)

Personal information
- Full name: Eloy Salgado, Jr.
- Date of birth: March 9, 1970 (age 56)
- Place of birth: Irving, Texas, U.S.
- Height: 5 ft 8 in (1.73 m)
- Position: Forward

Senior career*
Years	Team	Apps	(Gls)
1988–1991	Dallas Sidekicks (indoor)	112	(11)
1990–1991	Richardson Rockets		
1991–1992	Tulsa Ambush (indoor)	39	(47)
1992–1994	Dallas Rockets		
1992–1993	Detroit Rockers (indoor)	25	(35)
1993–1996	Milwaukee Wave (indoor)	65	(56)
1994	Houston Force	1	(0)
1995	Houston Hotshots (indoor)	2	(0)
1995–1996	Chicago Power (indoor)	19	(21)
1996–1998	Kansas City Attack (indoor)	59	(44)
1998–1999	Montreal Impact (indoor)	27	(25)
1998	Dallas Sidekicks (indoor)	1	(0)
1999–2000	Harrisburg Heat (indoor)	27	(15)
2000	St. Louis Ambush (indoor)	14	(8)

International career
1987	U.S. U-20		
- * Club domestic league appearances and goals

Eloy Salgado is an American retired soccer forward who played professionally in the Major Indoor Soccer League, National Professional Soccer League and USISL.

== Professional ==
In 1988, Salgado graduated from Lewisville High School where he was a 1988 Parade Magazine All American High School soccer player. On June 17, 1988, the Dallas Sidekicks selected Salgado in the third round (twenty-eight) overall of the Major Indoor Soccer League draft. He played three seasons for the Sidekicks. Salgado spent the summers of 1990 and 1991 with the Richardson Rockets of the SISL. In August, the Rockets finished runner up to the Brooklyn Italians in the 1991 U.S. Open Cup. In September 1991, Salgado signed with the Tulsa Ambush of the National Professional Soccer League. In the fall of 1992, of the Detroit Rockers signed Salgado for the upcoming NPSL season. On February 25, 1993, the Rockers traded him and their first round draft pick to the Milwaukee Wave in exchange for Joey Kirk. In 1994, Salgado began the summer outdoor season with the Dallas Rockets, but joined the Houston Force of the American Professional Soccer League. The Force played one game, then folded. That fall, Salgado began the indoor season with the Wave, then left the team in December for family reasons. In August 1995, he returned to professional soccer with the Houston Hotshots of the Continental Indoor Soccer League. At the end of the CISL season, Salgado returned to the Milwaukee Wave. On December 22, 1995, the Wave traded him to the Chicago Power for Tony Sanneh. On March 7, 1995, the Power then traded him to the Kansas City Attack for "future considerations." Salgado played for the Attack until sold to the Montreal Impact in February 1998. In 1998, he signed as free agent with the Sidekicks, playing only one game for them in the Premier Soccer Alliance. In October 1999, Salgado joined the Harrisburg Heat of the NPSL. On February 19, 2000, the Heat sent Salgado to the St. Louis Ambush for Ian Carter.

== International ==
In 1987, Salgado played for the United States men's national under-20 soccer team during a tour of Europe. He was also a member of the U.S. soccer team with won the 1991 Pan American Games gold medal.
