= Randy Pikuzinski =

American soccer player (born 1965)

Personal information
- Date of birth: June 9, 1965 (age 61)
- Place of birth: Cheektowaga, New York, U.S.
- Height: 5 ft 7 in (1.70 m)
- Positions: Forward; midfielder

Youth career
- Buffalo White Eagles

Senior career*
Years	Team	Apps	(Gls)
1983–1984	Buffalo Stallions (indoor)	4	(0)
1984	Buffalo Storm		
1985–1987	Canton Invaders (indoor)	27	(7)
1987–1988	Milwaukee Wave (indoor)	14	(6)
1987	St. Catharines Wolves		
1988–1991	Canton Invaders (indoor)	116	(64)
1991–1992	Chicago Power (indoor)	36	(16)
1992–2001	Buffalo Blizzard (indoor)	352	(182)
- * Club domestic league appearances and goals

Randy Pikuzinski (born June 9, 1965) is an American retired soccer player who played professionally in the Major Indoor Soccer League, National Professional Soccer League and United Soccer League.

Pikuzinski, and his brother Rudy, learned soccer from their father who managed the amateur Buffalo White Eagles. Both brothers played on the White Eagles. In 1983, Pikuzinski signed with the Buffalo Stallions of the Major Indoor Soccer League out of high school. In 1984, he played outdoor soccer with the Buffalo Storm of the United Soccer League. In 1985, Pikuzinski signed with the Canton Invaders of the American Indoor Soccer Association. He saw little playing time during his season and a half with the Invaders, but became a key player during the second half of the 1986–1987 season. At the end of the season, he became a free agent and signed with the Milwaukee Wave. During the 1987 outdoor season he featured in the National Soccer League with St. Catharines Wolves. In January 1988, the Wave traded him to the Canton Invaders in exchange for Tim Tyma and Pete Smith. He went on to win two more AISA championships with the Invaders. In October 1991, the Invaders traded Pikuzinski to the Chicago Power in exchange for the Power's 1992 first round draft pick. In September 1992, the Power traded Pikuzinski to the Buffalo Blizzard in exchange for Russ Prince, Chuck Codd and Ko Thandabouth. He would remain with the Blizzard until 2001. That year, after the Blizzard folded, the Harrisburg Heat selected Pikuzinski in the dispersal draft. Pikuzinski retired.

His brother Rudy was also a professional soccer player. He holds the appearance record for the NPSL, with 508 appearances.

Pikuzinski has two children, Randy Jr. and Ryan.
