= Otto Orf =

American soccer player (born 1963)

Personal information
- Full name: Otto E. Orf II
- Date of birth: November 4, 1963 (age 62)
- Place of birth: Elma, New York, U.S.
- Height: 6 ft 2 in (1.88 m)
- Position: Goalkeeper

Youth career
- 1981–1983: SUNY Buffalo

Senior career*
Years	Team	Apps	(Gls)
1984	Buffalo Storm		
1985–1986	Columbus Capitals (indoor)	8	(0)
1986–1989	Fort Wayne Flames (indoor)	59	(1)
1987–1988	Toronto Blizzard	3	(0)
1987	Toronto Italia		
1989	San Diego Sockers (indoor)	3	(0)
1989	San Diego Nomads	1	(0)
1989–2004	Cleveland Crunch/Force (indoor)	344	(7)
1990	Orlando Lions		

International career
1996–2000	US Futsal	8	(0)

Managerial career
- 2004: Cleveland Force (interim)
- * Club domestic league appearances and goals

Otto E. Orf II (born November 4, 1963) is an American retired soccer goalkeeper who played professionally in the United Soccer League and Major Indoor Soccer League and National Professional Soccer League. He played one game for the U.S. at the 1996 FIFA Futsal World Championship.

== Playing career ==
Orf first played soccer his sophomore year at Iroquois Central High School, trying out for goalkeeper because nobody else was interested in that position. By his senior season, he was the team MVP. Orf attended SUNY Buffalo where he played both baseball and soccer. His baseball career ended with an elbow injury his sophomore season. In 1984, he left SUNY Buffalo before his senior season to turn professional with the Buffalo Storm of the United Soccer League. The release by the Storm of their starting goalkeeper following financial difficulties brought about Orf signing on for $50 per week. In 1986, Orf signed with the Columbus Capitals of the American Indoor Soccer Association. After one season in Columbus, he moved to the Fort Wayne Flames for three seasons. He finished his Flames’ career with fifty-nine appearances and one goal. In addition to playing for the Flames, Orf backstopped the Toronto Blizzard of the Canadian Soccer League in 1987 and 1988. He also played in the National Soccer League in 1987 with Toronto Italia and later with Toronto Croatia. In April 1989, the San Diego Sockers of the Major Indoor Soccer League signed Orf. The AISA season had just ended and the Sockers were looking for a backup to Victor Nogueira after Zoltán Tóth went out injured. In 1989, Orf spent the summer playing for the San Diego Nomads of the Western Soccer League. In 1990, he played one last outdoor season, this time with the Orlando Lions of the American Professional Soccer League. In the fall of 1989, Orf signed with the Cleveland Crunch of the MISL. In 1992, the MISL collapsed and the Crunch moved to the National Professional Soccer League. In 2001, that league collapsed and the Crunch moved to the second Major Indoor Soccer League. In 2002, the Crunch became the Cleveland Force when it came under new team ownership. Orf played for Cleveland through all these changes in leagues and name before retiring in 2004.

== Futsal career ==
Orf earned eight caps with the United States national futsal team between 1996 and 2000. He played one game for the U.S. at the 1996 FIFA Futsal World Championship.

== Coaching career ==
In November and December 2004, Orf served as an interim coach for the Force when Omid Namazi was suspended for three games.
