= Terry Nicholl =

English footballer (born 1952)

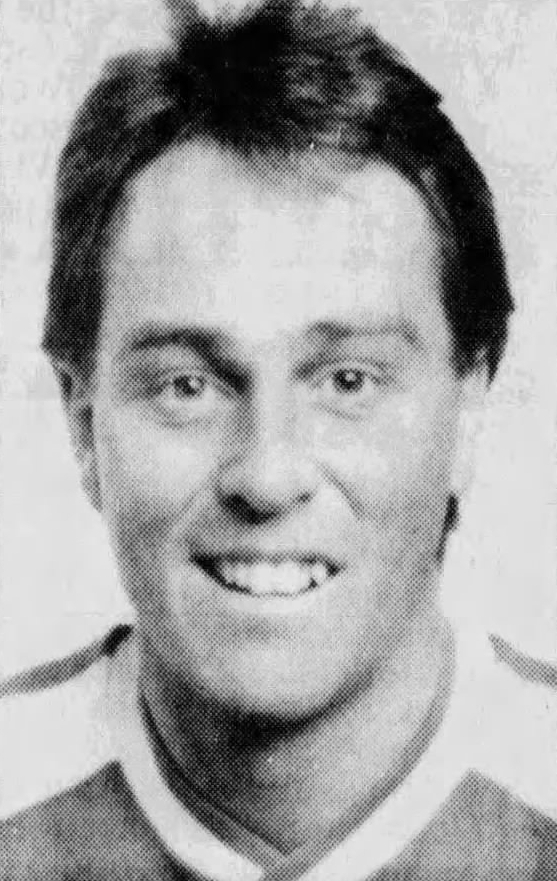
- Nicholl circa 1986

Personal information
- Full name: Terence John Nicholl
- Date of birth: 16 September 1952 (age 74)
- Place of birth: Wilmslow, England
- Position: Midfielder

Senior career*
Years	Team	Apps	(Gls)
1972–1973	Crewe Alexandra	46	(7)
1973–1975	Sheffield United	22	(1)
1975–1976	Southend United	53	(3)
1976–1981	Gillingham	184	(11)
1981–1986	Wichita Wings (indoor)	173	(46)

Managerial career
- 1986: Memphis Storm (assistant)
- 1986–1988: Memphis Storm
- 1988–1991: Wichita Wings
- 1992–1995: Dayton Dynamo
- 1992–2015: Seven Hills School
- 2003–2008: Cincinnati Excite
- 2008–2016: Cincinnati United Premier
- 2016–present: Kings Hammer Academy
- * Club domestic league appearances and goals

Terence John Nicholl (born 16 September 1952) is an English former association football player and manager. A midfielder, he played professionally in both England and the United States. He later managed several indoor teams in the United States where he was the 1987 and 1988 American Indoor Soccer Association Coach of the Year.

== Playing career ==
Nicholl's clubs included Crewe Alexandra, Sheffield United and Gillingham, where he made over 180 Football League appearances. In 1981, he moved to the USA where he signed with the Wichita Wings of the Major Indoor Soccer League. He remained with the Wings until his retirement from playing following an injury-marred 1985–86 season.

== Coaching career ==
Nicholl then turned to coaching in America, as an assistant with indoor side Memphis Storm of the American Indoor Soccer Association. On 8 December 1986, the Storm fired head coach Gary Hindley and elevated Nicholl to head coach. He was named the 1987 and 1988 AISA Coach Of The Year. He won this award although he left the Storm just prior to the playoffs and moved to coach the Wichita Wings on 2 February 1988. After the Wings began the 1990–91 season with a string of losses, the team ownership began mentioning the possibility of Nicholl's being fired. However, they reconsidered as the team began an upswing in December and January before again sliding down the table. On 5 February 1991, the Wings fired Nicholl with the team at 13–20.

Nicholl, who has a degree in mechanical engineering, then went to work for Metalex, an aerospace firm in Cincinnati, Ohio. While this led to a tripling of his salary, he nearly accepted an offer to manage former club Gillingham in May 1991. He instead chose to remain as a sales representative for Metalex until July 1992 when he returned to coaching with the Dayton Dynamo of the National Professional Soccer League. He lasted until 24 January 1995.

On 11 August 2003, the Cincinnati Excite of the American Indoor Soccer League hired Nicholl. He was fired on 14 June 2008. He then moved to coach the Cincinnati United Premier of the Super Y-League, a position he holds today.

In 1992, Nicholl became head coach of the varsity boys' soccer team at Seven Hills School in Cincinnati, known as the Stingers. In the 2009 season, he led the Stingers to the state semifinals and they finished with a 19–2–1 record. In 2013, Terry led Seven Hills to a regional semifinal and finished the season 13–3–4. Nicholl was named Miami Valley Conference coach of the year for 2014. He left Seven Hills after the 2014 season.

== Personal life ==
His brother Chris Nicholl and cousin Jimmy Nicholl were both also professional footballers.
