= Rubén Astigarraga =

Argentine footballer (born 1950)

Personal information
- Full name: Rubén Baltazar Astigarraga
- Date of birth: 3 August 1950 (age 76)
- Place of birth: Buenos Aires, Argentina
- Position: Forward

Senior career*
Years	Team	Apps	(Gls)
1971	Estudiantes (BA)		
1973–1974	Chacarita Juniors		
1975	Vélez Sársfield		
1975–1977	Zacatepec	37	(4)
1979	Memphis Rogues	16	(0)
1979	Tulsa Roughnecks	6	(2)
1979–1982	Cleveland Force (indoor)	41	(39)
1981–1982	New Jersey Rockets (indoor)	4	(0)
1980–1981	Cleveland Cobras	23	(10)
1982–1983	Phoenix Inferno (indoor)	43	(34)
1983–1984	Phoenix Pride (indoor)	26	(12)
1984–1985	Chicago Vultures (indoor)		
1985	Chicago Maroons		
1986–1987	Tampa Bay Rowdies (indoor)		
1989	Tampa Bay Rowdies	12	(10)

Managerial career
- 2009: Webber International University (assistant)
- * Club domestic league appearances and goals

Rubén Astigarraga (born 3 August 1950) is a retired Argentine soccer forward who played in the North American Soccer League, second and third American Soccer League, Major Indoor Soccer League, American Indoor Soccer Association and National Soccer League of Chicago.

== Player ==
In 1979, he signed with the Cleveland Force of the Major Indoor Soccer League. He played two full seasons with the Force, then began the 1981–1982 season before moving to the New Jersey Rockets. While in Cleveland beginning in 1980, he also played the summer outdoor seasons with the Cleveland Cobras of the second American Soccer League. He then played two indoor seasons in Phoenix, one with the Inferno and the second with the Pride. In 1984, Astigarraga signed with the Chicago Vultures of the American Indoor Soccer League. In 1985, he remained in Chicago and spent the summer playing for the Chicago Maroons of the National Soccer League of Chicago. In the fall of 1986, he signed with the Tampa Bay Rowdies of the American Indoor Soccer Association. In January 1987, the Rowdies sold Astigarra's contract to the Memphis Storm. In 1989, he played for the Tampa Bay Rowdies, now playing in the third American Soccer League. Coach Rodney Marsh released him on 24 May 1989.

== Coach ==
In 2009, he was hired as an assistant coach with the Webber International University women's soccer team.
