= Yaro Dachniwsky =

American handball player

Personal information
- Date of birth: January 15, 1963 (age 63)
- Place of birth: Chicago, United States
- Height: 6 ft 3 in (1.91 m)
- Position: Goalkeeper

College career
Years	Team	Apps	(Gls)
1983	UIC Flames		

Senior career*
Years	Team	Apps	(Gls)
1984–1985	Chicago Croatian		
1985–1986	Chicago Shoccers (indoor)	24	(0)
1986–1988	Memphis Storm (indoor)	29	(0)
1988–1989	Milwaukee Wave (indoor)	6	(0)
1989–1991	Atlanta Attack (indoor)	39	(0)
1991–1994	Atlanta Magic (indoor)		
1994	Carolina Vipers (indoor)	17	(0)
1994	San Diego Sockers (indoor)	14	(0)
1996	Atlanta Ruckus	4	(0)
1996–1997	Detroit Safari	25	(0)

International career
1994–1996	USA Handball		
- * Club domestic league appearances and goals

Yaro Dachniwsky is an American retired soccer goalkeeper who spent most of his career with indoor teams. He played part of the 1996 season with the Atlanta Ruckus in the who played professionally in the USL A-League. He was also a member of the United States men's national handball team which placed ninth at the 1996 Summer Olympics

== Soccer ==
Dachniwsky grew up in Ukrainian Village, Chicago. Dachniwsky's grandfather Dmytro Dachniwsky played for Ukraina Lwów. His father, Myron, played for Ukrainian Lions in the National Soccer League of Chicago. Dachniwsky graduated from Gordon Technical High School and attended the University of Illinois at Chicago, playing one year on the Flames' soccer team. In 1984, Dachniwsky worked with the Chicago Sting reserve team, but was not offered a professional contract. He then played for the Wings SC (two seasons) and Chicago Croatians of the National Soccer League of Chicago. Croatian won the 1984 National Challenge Cup, but Dachniwsky spent most of the tournament as a backup goalkeeper. In 1985, Dachniwsky signed with the Chicago Shoccers of the American Indoor Soccer Association. In 1986, he moved to the Memphis Storm where he spent two seasons. Dachniwsky moved to the Milwaukee Wave for the 1988–89 AISA season, then to the Atlanta Attack of the National Professional Soccer League in 1989. In 1991, Dachniwsky moved to yet another league, this time the USISL where he would win three consecutive indoor championships with the Atlanta Magic. He was the 1993 and 1994 USISL indoor Goalkeeper of the Year. In 1994, Dachniwsky signed with the Carolina Vipers of the Continental Indoor Soccer League. Midway through the season, he joined the San Diego Sockers. On August 14, 1994, the Sockers released Dachniwsky. From November 1994 through the first week of August 1996, Dachniwsky played team handball. On August 27, 1996, the Atlanta Ruckus signed Dachniwsky for the remainder of the 1996 A-League season. He retired at the end of the season.

== Handball ==
In November 1994, Dachniwsky attended a trial with the United States men's national handball team. He was elected for the team as it prepared for the 1996 Summer Olympics. He was a member of the 1996 U.S. Olympic Handball Team.

== Business executive ==
In 1997, the Chicago Fire Soccer Club hired Dachniwsky as the Manager of Corporate Sales. On September 25, 2005, Dachniwsky left the Fire to join the Chicago Storm as Vice President of Business Development. A year later he became the Corporate Alliance Director at Six Flags. In 2009, he became the Sports Medicine Development Director at Louis A. Weiss Memorial Hospital in Chicago.
