= Victor Petroni =

Canadian soccer player (born 1959)

Personal information
- Date of birth: March 3, 1959 (age 67)
- Place of birth: Toronto, Ontario, Canada
- Position: Goalkeeper

Senior career*
Years	Team	Apps	(Gls)
1980–1981	Buffalo Stallions (indoor)	2	(0)
1980	Buffalo Blazers		
1981–1983	Kansas City Comets (indoor)	44	(0)
1983–1984	Phoenix Pride (indoor)	16	(0)
1984–1986	Kalamazoo Kangaroos (indoor)	33	(0)
1986–1987	Louisville Thunder (indoor)	26	(0)

Managerial career
- 1993–1995: Louisville Cardinals
- * Club domestic league appearances and goals

Victor Petroni (born March 3, 1959) is a Canadian retired soccer goalkeeper who played professionally in the Major Indoor Soccer League and American Indoor Soccer Association.

== Playing career ==
In 1980, Petroni signed with the Buffalo Stallions of the Major Indoor Soccer League. In the summer of 1980 he played in the National Soccer League with the Buffalo Blazers. In 1981, he moved to the Kansas City Comets. He played two seasons with Kansas City before joining the Phoenix Pride. The Pride folded at the end of the season and Petroni had trials with several MISL teams before signing with the Kalamazoo Kangaroos of the American Indoor Soccer Association. He was the 1986 AISA Goalkeeper of the Year with the Kangaroos. In the fall of 1986, he moved to the Louisville Thunder.

== Coaching career ==
After retiring Petroni became Director of Coaching at the Athletic Flames Football Club in Kentucky. In February 1993, the University of Louisville hired Petroni to coach the men's soccer team. He coached the team for three seasons, compiling a 14–41–3 record.

Petroni was the director of goalkeeping for the Javanon FC in Louisville, Kentucky and has coached several teams at Javanon, including 2001 Boys Black and 1995 Boys teams.

== Refereeing career ==
Petroni is also a referee and refereeing assessor in the state of Kentucky.

== Honours ==
- AISA Goalkeeper of the Year: 1985 - 1986
- AISA All-Star Team: 1985 - 1986
