= Trevor Dawkins =

English footballer (born 1945)

Personal information
- Full name: Trevor Andrew Dawkins
- Date of birth: 7 October 1945 (age 81)
- Place of birth: Thorpe Bay, Essex
- Positions: Defender; midfielder

Senior career*
Years	Team	Apps	(Gls)
1962–1967	West Ham United	6	(0)
1967–1972	Crystal Palace	25	(3)
1971	→ Germiston Callies (loan)		
1971	→ Brentford (loan)	4	(0)
1972	Germiston Callies		
1973–1974	Durban United		
1975–1976	Durban City		
1977	Highlands Park		
1978–1980	Sacramento Gold		
1980–1984	Cleveland Force (indoor)	168	(16)
1984–1985	Canton Invaders (indoor)	0	(0)

International career
- England Schoolboys
- England Youth

Managerial career
- 1979: Sacramento Gold
- 1985–1988: Canton Invaders
- 1989–1990: Cleveland Crunch (assistant)
- 1990–1992: Cleveland Crunch
- 1992–1994: Buffalo Blizzard
- 1995–1997: Houston Hotshots
- 1999–2000: Houston Hotshots
- * Club domestic league appearances and goals

Trevor Dawkins (born 7 October 1945) is an English retired professional footballer who played as a defender or midfielder. He spent seven seasons in the Football League, five in South Africa, and seven in the United States, most in indoor leagues. Following his retirement in 1985, he coached for fourteen years in the U.S. indoor leagues. He was the 1986 AISA Coach of the Year, 1991 MISL Coach of the Year and 1996 CISL Coach of the Year.

== Playing career ==
Dawkins was born in Thorpe Bay, Essex and began his professional career with West Ham United when he was fifteen. In 1964, he entered West Ham's first team. but made only six league appearances before signing for Crystal Palace of Division Two in October 1967. He made his league debut in January 1968, in a home 1–0 defeat to Hull City but it was his only league appearance that season, although he made two as a substitute in the League Cup. In 1968–69, when Palace achieved promotion to the top tier for the first time, Dawkins made four appearances scoring once. In each of the subsequent two seasons he made ten appearances, scoring two goals in 1969–70. In September 1971, he moved to Brentford on loan.

In 1978, he moved to the United States where he signed with the Sacramento Gold of the American Soccer League. He played at least two seasons in Sacramento, with part of the 1979 season spent as a player-coach. The team withdrew from the league following the 1980 season and Dawkins joined the Cleveland Force of the Major Indoor Soccer League. In 1984, Dawkins signed with the Canton Invaders of the American Indoor Soccer Association. While he remained with the team the entire year, he never saw first team time.

== Coaching career ==
In 1979, Dawkins became the head coach of the Sacramento Gold for the last four months of the American Soccer League season. On 11 July 1985, Dawkins was hired as the head coach of the Canton Invaders in the American Indoor Soccer Association. He took the team to the AISA title and was named AISA Coach of the Year. He took the Invaders to the 1987 championship series which they lost to Louisville. He began the 1987–88 season with Canton, but was fired on 14 March 1988. He was subsequently hired as part of the staff at the Cleveland Force Fitness Facility. In 1989, Dawkins moved to the expansion Cleveland Crunch as an assistant coach. During the 1990–91 season, the team began a slide down the table at mid-season and on 20 December 1990 Dawkins replaced Kai Haaskivi as head coach. He took the team to the championship series and was named the 1991 MISL Coach of the Year. When the league collapsed following the 1991–92 season, the Force moved to the National Professional Soccer League and replaced Dawkins with Gary Hindley. On 15 August 1992, Dawkins was hired as the head coach of the Buffalo Blizzard. After a disappointing 1993–94 season, the Blizzard fired Dawkins on 23 June 1994. On 8 February 1995, the Houston Hotshots of the Continental Indoor Soccer League (CISL) hired Dawkins. In 1996, he added to his achievements when he was named the CISL Coach of the Year. Financial problems led the Hotshots owner to withdraw the team from the CISL in 1998. Dawkins passed on several coaching offers in order to be available when the Hotshots returned in 1999. In 2000, the Hotshots moved to the World Indoor Soccer League which replaced the CISL.
