= Don Tobin =

English footballer (born 1955)

Personal information
- Date of birth: 1 November 1955 (age 70)
- Place of birth: Liverpool, England
- Position: Midfielder

Youth career
- 1970–1971: Everton

Senior career*
| Years | Team | Apps | (Gls) |
| 1971–1973 | Everton | 0 | (0) |
| 1973–1976 | Rochdale | 47 | (5) |
| 1976–1977 | Witton Albion | | |
| 1977–1978 | Sligo Rovers | | (4) |
| 1978–1980 | California Sunshine | 31 | (3) |
| 1980–1982 | Wichita Wings (indoor) | 71 | (17) |
| 1981–1983 | Carolina Lightnin' | 50 | (7) |
| 1982–1984 | Los Angeles Lazers (indoor) | 90 | (50) |
| 1984–1987 | Canton Invaders (indoor) | 115 | (58) |
| 1984 | Rochester Flash | | |
| 1985 | Tulsa Tornados | | |
| 1988–1989 | Tampa Bay Rowdies | 16 | |
| 1989 | Memphis Rogues (indoor) | 7 | (2) |
| 1990 | Orlando Lions | | |

Managerial career
- 1984–1987: Canton Invaders (assistant)
- 1989: Memphis Rogues
- 2000: Tampa Bay Extreme
- 2007–2014: Tampa Spartans (assistant)
- 2010: FC Tampa Bay Rowdies (interim assistant)
- 2012–2019: Florida Tropics WSC
- * Club domestic league appearances and goals

Don Tobin (1 November 1955) is an English retired footballer who played in leagues including the English Football League, the League of Ireland, the American Soccer League, and Major Indoor Soccer League. Since 1995 he has coached at various levels in the Tampa Bay Area, most often with women's teams.

== Playing career ==
As a youth, Tobin spent a brief period with the Everton Academy before catching on at age 16 with the First Division senior club, Everton in 1971. From there he moved to Rochdale of the Third Division for three years. He spent one season at Witton Albion and one in Ireland at Sligo Rovers before moving to the United States. While at Rovers he was part of the side that reached the 1977–78 FAI Cup finals.

For many years he spent summers with outdoor teams and winters playing indoor soccer. From 1978 to 1980 he played for the California Sunshine and joined the indoor Wichita Wings of MISL from 1980 to 1982. From 1981 to 1983 he played for the Carolina Lightnin' outdoors and from 1982 to 1984 with Los Angeles Lazers indoors. With a goal and an assist, Tobin was named MVP of the 1981 ASL finals, which Carolina won, 2–1. He would spend the next three indoor seasons with the American Indoor Soccer Association's Canton Invaders, winning AISA titles in 1984–85 and 1985–86. Tobin was an AISA all-star and league MVP in 1985–86 for the Invaders. He had brief hitches outdoors with the Rochester Flash and Tulsa Tornados of the short-lived, United Soccer League. In 1988, he found his way to the Tampa Bay Rowdies, who at the time were playing in the third incarnation of the ASL. Tobin was player-coach for the indoor Memphis Rogues at the start of the 1989–89 season and finished out his playing career with the Orlando Lions in the American Professional Soccer League.

== Coaching career ==
While still a player in Canton he also served as an assistant coach. In 1989–90 he was hired as the head coach of the Memphis Rogues of the AISA. Beginning in 1995, Tobin spent 19 years as the director of coaching, Dunedin Stirling Soccer Club in Dunedin, Florida. While there he also created the Tobin's School of Soccer Science Academy Program. In 2000, he was the coach of the Tampa Bay Extreme of the W-League. He was an assistant coach and technical director at the University of Tampa from 2007 to 2014, and part of the staff of the 2007 NCAA Division II Women's National Championship team. During the 2010 season he was an interim assistant coach for FC Tampa Bay Rowdies of the USSF Division 2 Professional League.

Tobin is presently the director of coaching at Pinellas County United in St. Petersburg, Florida and is a coach with the National Training Center (NTC). Since 2012, he also serves as the head coach of the WPSL team Florida Tropics WSC and holds a USSF "B" License. He and his wife reside in St. Petersburg, Florida and have two children.

== Honours ==
=== Player ===
- FAI Cup runner-up: 1977–78
- ASL: 1981
- ASL Western Division: 1979
- ASL Freedom Conference: 1981
- AISA: 1984–85, 1985–86; runner-up 1986–87
- AISA Regular Season: 1984–85, 1985–86
- AISA Northern Division: 1986–87

Individual

- ASL First team All-Star: 1979, 1981
- ASL Finals MVP: 1981
- AISA League MVP: 1985–86
- AISA First team All-Star: 1985–86

=== Assistant coach ===
- NCAA Division II Women's Soccer: 2007
