= Oscar Pisano =

Argentine footballer and manager

Personal information
- Date of birth: 3 September 1956 (age 70)
- Place of birth: Buenos Aires, Argentina
- Height: 1.73 m (5 ft 8 in)
- Position: Defender

Youth career
- 1977: Argentinos Juniors
- 1978: Huracan de las Heras
- 1979: Argentino de Quilmes

Senior career*
Years	Team	Apps	(Gls)
1979	Memphis Rogues	1	(0)
1979–1980	Cleveland Cobras		
1979–1980	Cleveland Force (indoor)	16	(2)
1980–1984	Buffalo Stallions (indoor)	163	(24)
1981–1983	Rochester Flash		
1984	Buffalo Storm		
1984–1994	Canton Invaders (indoor)		
1986	Toronto Italia		
1990	Orlando Lions		
1994–1995	Las Vegas Dustdevils (indoor)	44	(5)
1995	Buffalo Blizzard (indoor)	19	(1)

International career
1994–1995	Argentina national futsal team	2	(0)

Managerial career
- 1987–1990: Canton Invaders (assistant)
- 1992–1993: Canton Invaders
- Montreal Impact (assistant)
- 1996–1998: Columbus Crew (assistant)
- 1998–2000: Dallas Burn (assistant)
- * Club domestic league appearances and goals

Oscar Pisano (born 3 September 1956) is a retired Argentine football defender who went on to become a football manager. Pisano spent time in numerous North American indoor and outdoor leagues including the North American Soccer League, Major Indoor Soccer League, American Soccer League, American Professional Soccer League and Canadian National Soccer League. He earned two caps with the Argentina national futsal team in 1994 and 1995.

== Player ==
Pisano spent most of his playing career in the United States where he played indoor and outdoor soccer. In 1979, he signed with the Memphis Rogues of the North American Soccer League. He played only one game before being released. He was then signed with the Cleveland Cobras of the American Soccer League. In the fall of 1979, he signed with the Cleveland Force of the Major Indoor Soccer League. He returned to the Cobras for the 1980 outdoor season before joining the Buffalo Stallions of MISL in the fall of 1980. During his years with the Stallions, he continued outdoors during the summer with the Rochester Flash of the American Soccer League in 1981, 1982 and 1983. In 1984, he played for the Buffalo Storm in the United Soccer League. He then moved to the Canton Invaders of the American Indoor Soccer Association. He would go on to play ten seasons with the Invaders. In 1986, he played for Toronto Italia in the Canadian National Soccer League. In 1990, he played for the Orlando Lions of the American Professional Soccer League. In summers of 1994 and 1995, he played for the Las Vegas Dustdevils in the Continental Indoor Soccer League. He played for the Argentina national indoor football team twice between 1994 and 1995. In 1995, he played for the Buffalo Blizzard of the National Professional Soccer League.

== Coach ==
In September 1992, he was elevated to head coach of the Invaders. In 1996, Oscar was hired as Assistant Coach of the Columbus Crew. Coaching there until 21 January 1998, when he was named an assistant coach with the Dallas Burn of Major League Soccer.

== Yearly Awards ==
- 1984–1985 AISA – Defender of the Year
- 1984–1985 AISA – All-Star Team
- 1984–1986 AISA – Defender of the Year
- 1984–1986 AISA – All-Star Team
