= Kalamazoo Kangaroos =

The Kalamazoo Kangaroos were an indoor soccer club based in Kalamazoo, Michigan that competed in the American Indoor Soccer Association.

The team was started in 1984 as one of the original members of the AISA. They played their games at Wings Stadium which seated 5,000 people and were coached in year one by Chris Bartels. The team was composed primarily of young, ex-college players with their first chance at professional play. Player assistant coach Mike Garrett had played in the Major Indoor Soccer League (MISL) and was named the head coach midway through year two with the team in last place. Garrett led the team to a turnaround as they won most of their remaining games and made the playoffs. Key players were goalkeeper Victor Petroni (formerly of Kansas City in the MISL), leading goal scorer Neil Ridgway, Ted Powers, Dave Pierce (formerly of Wichita in the MISL) and player coach Mike Garrett. At the conclusion of year two, the team went defunct and most of the players moved on.

The top players played on other teams in the league, which had now become the National Professional Soccer League (NPSL); Victor Petroni and Paul Kato with the Louisville Thunder, Neil Ridgway and Ted Powers with the Toledo Pride. Garrett also moved on in mid season to become the head coach of the Toledo Pride. He coached that team to a turnaround from last place to third and into the playoffs. Pierce retired from professional soccer to pursue business interests.

== Coaches ==
- (United States) Chris Bartels (1984–85)
- (United States) Mike Garrett (1985–86)

== Year-by-year ==
Year	Division	League	Reg. season	Playoffs	Avg. attendance
1984–85	2	AISA	4th	Semifinals	2,083
1985–86	2	AISA	3rd	Semifinals	1,734
