= Hershey Impact =

- Founded: 1988
- Folded: 1991
- League: National Professional Soccer League
- Based in: Hershey, Pennsylvania
- Arena: Hersheypark Arena
- Owner: Larry Samples and 15 other owners
- Head coach: Niki Nikolic
- Championships: None

The Hershey Impact was an indoor soccer club based in Hershey, Pennsylvania that competed in the National Professional Soccer League.

The team played its home games at the Hersheypark Arena for all of its three seasons.

On July 1, 1991, the Impact declared bankruptcy and dissolved. Seven players from the 1990–91 Impact played the following season for the 1991–92 Harrisburg Heat, but the Heat were an expansion franchise and not a relocation and continuation of the Impact.

== Staff and ownership ==
- President – Larry Samples
- General Manager – Charles (Chuck) Wasilefski
- Public Relations Director – Todd Parnell
- Equipment Manager – Michael Butula

== Coaches ==
- (Socialist Federal Republic of Yugoslavia) Niki Nikolic

== Year-by-year ==
Year	Division	League	Reg. season	Playoffs	Avg. attendance
1988–89	2	AISA	4th	Semifinals	
1989–90	2	AISA	3rd, American	1st Round	
1990–91	2	NPSL	4th, American	Did not qualify	3,398
