= Bret Hall =

American soccer coach (born 1956)

Personal information
- Date of birth: November 16, 1956 (age 69)
- Place of birth: Buffalo, New York, USA
- Positions: Defender; midfielder

Youth career
- Wheaton College

Senior career*
Years	Team	Apps	(Gls)
1979–1983	Chicago Sting	81	(1)
1980–1983	Chicago Sting (indoor)	84	(12)
1983–1984	Phoenix Pride (indoor)	12	(0)
1985	Cleveland Force (indoor)	62	(2)
1985–1986	Chicago Sting (indoor)	43	(1)
1988–1995	Chicago Power (indoor)	162	(6)
Total		408	(15)

Managerial career
- 1998: Chicago Stingers
- 1999–2000: Chicago Sockers
- 2001–2002: Chicago Fire Reserves
- Baylor University
- 2001: U.S. Women (assistant)
- * Club domestic league appearances and goals

Bret Hall (born November 16, 1956) is an American soccer coach and former professional player who played in the NASL, Major Indoor Soccer League and National Professional Soccer League. He has coached at the collegiate, professional and national team levels.

== Player ==
Hall played soccer for Wheaton College, graduating in 1979. The Portland Timbers of the North American Soccer League drafted Hall in the second round of the 1979 NASL Draft. He never played for the Timbers. Instead, he played for the Chicago Sting from 1980 to 1983.

In 1981 he became a NASL league champion winning the Soccer Bowl with the Sting, defeating the New York Cosmos in Toronto and bringing the title back to Chicago. In the fall of 1983, he moved to the Cleveland Force of the Major Indoor Soccer League. In 1988, he moved to the Chicago Power of the American Indoor Soccer Association where he was a 1988 First Team All Star and the 1990 Defender of the Year and a First Team All Star.

== Coach ==
In August 1994, Hall became the Director of Coaching for the Chicago Power. In 1998, he was hired by the Chicago Stingers of the USISL. He took the team to the league championship. In 1999, the team was renamed the Sockers and he took them to two more titles before the team folded following the 2000 season. In 2000, he was hired to coach the Indiana Blast, but stepped down a few weeks later without coaching a game. In 2001, he became the head coach of the Chicago Fire Reserves. In those five seasons, he had a 67-21-2 record. Hall later coached at Baylor University.

He was inducted into the USL Hall of Fame in 2004.
