= Rudy Pikuzinski =

American soccer player and coach

Personal information
- Date of birth: August 9, 1959 (age 67)
- Place of birth: Buffalo, New York, United States
- Height: 5 ft 9 in (1.75 m)
- Position: Forward

Senior career*
Years	Team	Apps	(Gls)
1977	Buffalo Blazers		
1983–1984	Buffalo Stallions (indoor)	29	(11)
1984	Buffalo Storm	?	(5)
1984–1991	Canton Invaders (indoor)	133	(174)
1987	St. Catharines Wolves		
1990–1992	Cleveland Crunch (indoor)	67	(39)
1992–2000	Buffalo Blizzard (indoor)	262	(317)

Managerial career
- 1999–2000: Buffalo Blizzard (assistant)
- * Club domestic league appearances and goals

Rudy Pikuzinski (born August 9, 1959) is a former U.S. soccer forward who spent most of his career playing indoor soccer. He was a three time American Indoor Soccer Association MVP and served as an assistant coach his last year as a player.

== Youth ==
Pikuzinski, and his brother Randy, grew up in Buffalo, New York where they learned to play from their father. Pikuzinski attended Bishop Turner High School and The Park School, playing soccer at both. Pikuzinski set the single season scoring record at The Park School. He also played with the White Eagles of the Western New York Premier Soccer League, winning four championships.

== Professional ==
Pikuzinski played in the National Soccer League in 1977 with the Buffalo Blazers. In 1983, the Buffalo Stallions of Major Indoor Soccer League (MISL) drafted Pikuzinski. He played one season with them, but when the Stallions folded at the end of the 1983–1984 season, Pikuzinski moved to the Buffalo Storm of the outdoor United Soccer League. The Storm folded in 1984 and Pikuzinski signed with the expansion Canton Invaders of the newly established American Indoor Soccer Association (AISA). Pikuzinski took a back seat to team leading scorer Kia Zolgharnain his first two seasons with the Invaders as the team took two consecutive AISA championships. In his third season with the Invaders, Pikuzinski became the league's leading scorer. He was named a first team All Star and league MVP. That season, the Invaders lost in the finals, but won the next three championships as Pikuzinski earned his second and third MVP awards. During the 1987 outdoor season he returned to the National Soccer League to play with St. Catharines Wolves. In 1991, Pikuzinski moved to the Cleveland Crunch of MISL. The Crunch went to the semifinals before falling to the Dallas Sidekicks. In 1992 after the MISL folded, Pikuzinski returned to Buffalo when he signed with the expansion Buffalo Blizzard of the National Professional Soccer League (NPSL). Pikuzinski remained with the Blizzard through the 1999–2000 season before he retired from playing professionally. During his last season of play, he also served as an assistant coach with the Blizzard.

Pikuzinski was inducted into the Greater Buffalo Sports Hall of Fame in 2006.

== Honors ==
- MVP: 1987, 1988, 1989
- Leading scorer: 1987, 1988

AISA/NPSL All Time Statistical Leaders

1. 6th in Points- 1224
2. 5th in Goals- 511
3. 8th in Assists- 340

Forward for All Time AISA/NPSL Team

First Team All Star

- 1987, 1988, 1989, 1990, 1993
