= Kansas City Attack =

- Full name: Atlanta Attack: 1989-1991; Kansas City Attack: 1991-2001; Kansas City Comets: 2001-2005
- Founded: August 1989; 36 years ago
- Dissolved: Sept. 2005; 20 years ago
- Stadium: Omni Coliseum: 1989-1991: Municipal Auditorium: 1991-1992; Kemper Arena: 1992-2005
- Owner(s): Chris Economides and Louis Gitsis; purchased in 1991
- League: NPSL : 1989-2001; MISL: 2001-05

The Kansas City Attack, previously the Atlanta Attack and later known as the Kansas City Comets, were an indoor soccer team based for most of its existence in Kansas City, Missouri. In its various incarnations the franchise played in the National Professional Soccer League from 1989–2001 and the second Major Indoor Soccer League from 2001–2005. They played their home games at the Municipal Auditorium and later Kemper Arena.

== History ==
The franchise originated as the Atlanta Attack, which joined the American Indoor Soccer Association as an expansion team based in Atlanta, Georgia in 1989. In 1990 the league changed its name to the National Professional Soccer League. On September 4, 1991 the team relocated to Kansas City, Missouri, which had just lost its prolific Major Indoor Soccer League team, becoming the Kansas City Attack. The Attack played their first season at the Municipal Auditorium and moved into Kemper Arena in 1992.

The 1992–93 season was also the first of two national NPSL championship years for the Attack with Rookie Eddie Carmean scoring the game winning goal in the semi-final overtime to send the Attack to finals for the first time.

Kansas City was one of the more successful of the NPSL's teams, though the league itself declined in the late 1990s. In 2001 the league disbanded, and Kansas City and the NPSL's five other remaining teams formed a new league, the second Major Indoor Soccer League. At this time the team renamed itself the Kansas City Comets, after the city's original indoor soccer team. In 2005 the franchise announced that it would not play in the 2005–2006 and 2006–2007 seasons, but hoped to reform thereafter. However, the team did not reorganize by the time the second MISL folded in 2008.

In 2010, the Missouri Comets, based in nearby Independence, joined the third Major Indoor Soccer League as an expansion team, carrying on the Comets name.

== Logo History ==
1989-1991

1991-1996

1996-2001

2001-2005

== Year-by-year ==
Year	Division	League	Reg. season	Playoffs	Avg. attendance
1989–90	2	AISA	2nd, American (23–17)	Lost Semifinals	
1990–91	2	NPSL	2nd, American (25–15)	Lost in the 1st round	3,715
1991–92	2	NPSL	2nd, National (26–14)	Lost Semifinals	3,009
1992–93	1	NPSL	2nd, National (26–14)	Champions	4,644
1993–94	1	NPSL	6th, National (14–26)	Did not qualify	4,240
1994–95	1	NPSL	2nd, National (29–11)	Lost 2nd Round	3,870
1995–96	1	NPSL	1st, National (32–8)	Lost Finals	4,865
1996–97	1	NPSL	2nd(t), National Midwest (26–14)	Champions	5,619
1997–98	1	NPSL	3rd, National Midwest (20–20)	Lost Conference Semifinals	5,214
1998–99	1	NPSL	2nd, National Midwest (19–21)	Lost Conference Semifinals	5,990
1999–00	1	NPSL	1st, National Midwest (24–20)	Lost Conference Semifinals	5,127
2000–01	1	NPSL	4th, National (14–26)	Lost Conference Semifinals	5,324
2001–02	1	MISL	3rd, MISL (24–20)	Lost Semifinals	4,661
2002–03	1	MISL	2nd, Western (17–19)	Lost Conference Finals	5,414
2003–04	1	MISL	2nd, Central (17–19)	Lost Semifinals	5,374
2004–05	1	MISL	5th, MISL (18–21)	Did not qualify	4,789

== Honors ==
Championships

- 1992–1993 NPSL Champions
- 1996–1997 NPSL Champions

Division titles

- 1995–1996 National Division
- 1999–2000 Midwest Division

== Head coaches ==
- (United States) Keith Tozer 1991–1992
- (Socialist Federal Republic of Yugoslavia) Zoran Savic 1992–1996
- (United States) Jim Schwab 1996–2000
- (Socialist Federal Republic of Yugoslavia) Zoran Savic 2000–2005

== Arenas ==
- The Omni 1989–1991
- Municipal Auditorium 1991–1992
- Kemper Arena 1992–2005
