= Kia Zolgharnain =

Iranian-American football player

Kia
Personal information
- Full name: Kia Zolgharnaina
- Date of birth: November 10, 1965 (age 60)
- Place of birth: Mashhad, Imperial State of Iran
- Height: 5 ft 5 in (1.65 m)
- Position: Forward

Senior career*
Years	Team	Apps	(Gls)
1983–1984	Phoenix Pride (indoor)	15	(4)
1984–1987	Canton Invaders (indoor)	119	(135)
1987–1989	Kansas City Comets (indoor)	104	(66)
1989–1991	Tacoma Stars (indoor)	67	(40)
1991–1994	Canton Invaders (indoor)	113	(189)
1994–1996	Pittsburgh Stingers (indoor)	60	(60)
1996–2000	Cleveland Crunch (indoor)	56	(33)
Total		534	(527)

International career
1995	United States (futsal)	5	(2)

Managerial career
- 2000: Cleveland Crunch (assistant)
- 2001: John Carroll University (assistant)
- 2022: Akron City FC
- * Club domestic league appearances and goals

Kia Zolgharnain (born November 10, 1965) is an Iranian-American soccer coach and former player. As a player, Zolgharnain was a forward who led the American Indoor Soccer Association in scoring during the 1986–1987 season. He coaches youth soccer in Cleveland. During his playing days, he was known by his first name alone.

== Youth and high school ==
Although born in Iran, Zolgharnain's family fled the country after the 1978 Iranian Revolution. They settled in Scottsdale, Arizona where Zolgharnain attended Coronado High School. He became a U.S. citizen in 1994.

== Playing ==
=== Professional ===
In 1983, Kia chose to turn professional coming out of high school. From 1983 to 2000 he scored 527 goals in 534 professional indoor appearances with the likes of the Phoenix Pride, Canton Invaders, Kansas City Comets, Tacoma Stars, Pittsburgh Stingers, and Cleveland Crunch. He is best known for his success with the Invaders where he scored an astonishing 324 goals.

He signed with the Phoenix Pride of Major Indoor Soccer League (MISL). In 1984, he moved to the expansion Canton Invaders of the American Indoor Soccer Association (AISA). The Invaders won the 1985 and 1986 AISA championships as Zolgharnain was selected as a first team All Star both seasons. In 1987, Kia returned to MISL, this time with the Kansas City Comets. On December 23, 1989, the Comets traded Kia and Gerry Gray to the Tacoma Stars in exchange for Barry Wallace. In 1991, Kia rejoined the Canton Invaders. In 1995 and 1996, Kia spent two summer indoor seasons with the Pittsburgh Stingers in the Continental Indoor Soccer League. In 1996, Kia signed with the Cleveland Crunch of the National Professional Soccer League (NPSL). While he played thirty-seven games in the 1996–1997 season, his playing time rapidly dropped over the next three seasons. In 1997–1998, he played only fifteen games. That fell to one in 1998–1999 and three at the beginning of the 1999–2000 season. The Crunch waived him on December 3, 1999. Zolgharnain finished his career ranked ninth on the AISA/NPSL goals list. He was also a two time first team All Star.

=== Futsal ===
Zolgharnain earned five caps, scoring two goals, with the U.S. Futsal team in 1995. That year, the U.S. finished fourth in the Futsal Mundialito.

== Coaching ==
Zolgharnain has been coaching at the youth soccer level since 1984. He began as a coach in the Ohio Olympic Developmental Program. After retiring from playing, he became an assistant coach with the Cleveland Crunch. In 2001, he spent a season as an assistant coach at John Carroll University. He then joined the Cleveland Soccer Academy as the Director of Coaching, a position he held from 2001 to 2005. In 2003, he became a Super Y-League coach with the Cleveland Crunch Juniors. The team won the 2003 U-19 Super Y National Championship.

In November 2005, he left Cleveland and moved to Georgia where he became the Director of Coaching for the Peachtree City Youth Soccer Association. In 2007, he returned to Cleveland as the Director of Coaching for CASA (Cleveland Alliance Soccer Association) U16 & U18 USSF developmental Academy.

In 2019 Kia created the soccer training and consulting firm Go2Goal. Go2Goal provides independent training sessions for youth of all ages in Northeast Ohio. Along with their independent training program, Go2Goal also has secured multi year contracts to oversee the development of the Chagrin Falls and Solon Soccer Club community travel programs. Chagrin Falls and Solon Soccer Club are considered two of the most well run community travel programs in Northeast Ohio and have continued to flourish under Kia's leadership. In the fall of 2020, Kia founded a new premier club program called Sporting Chagrin Valley Football Academy. The academy had increased its enrollment to 225 players (2023–24), up from 40 its first year (2020–21) and achieved great success on the field. In the summer of 2024 it was announced that Sporting was acquired by North FC and Kia was installed as Director of the pod based in Chagrin/Solon).

He served as head coach and technical director of Akron City FC during their inaugural 2022 campaign.

== Business ==
In addition to playing and coaching soccer, Zolgharnain has owned several businesses including a chain of sporting goods stores in Pittsburgh, Pennsylvania.
