= Chicago Shoccers =

American indoor soccer club

- Founded: 1984
- Dissolved: 1987
- League: American Indoor Soccer Association

The Chicago Vultures were an indoor soccer club based in Chicago, Illinois, that competed in the American Indoor Soccer Association.

After their first season, the club was renamed the Chicago Shoccers.

== Coaches ==
Luis Dabo 1985–1986
Aleks Mihailovic 1986
Dave Huson 1986
Mike Grbic 1986–1987

== Year-by-year ==
Year	Division	League	Reg. season	Playoffs	Open Cup
1984–85	2	AISA	5th	Did not qualify	N/A
1985–86	2	AISA	4th	Semifinals	N/A
1986–87	2	AISA	2nd, Northern	Semifinals	N/A
