= Tim Tyma =

American soccer player, coach and referee

Personal information
- Date of birth: December 14, 1960 (age 65)
- Place of birth: Cleveland, Ohio, United States
- Position: Defender

College career
Years	Team	Apps	(Gls)
1979	Cleveland State Vikings		

Senior career*
Years	Team	Apps	(Gls)
1980–1982	Kansas City Comets (indoor)	4	(0)
1984–1988	Canton Invaders (indoor)	105	(18)
1985	Tulsa Tornados		
1988–1991	Milwaukee Wave (indoor)	117	(23)
1991–1992	Illinois Thunder (indoor)	40	(3)
1992–1997	Cleveland Crunch (indoor)	192	(33)

Managerial career
- 1996–1997: Cleveland Crunch (assistant)
- * Club domestic league appearances and goals

Tim Tyma (born December 14, 1960) is a former American soccer forward, coach and referee. Tyma played professionally in the Major Indoor Soccer League and National Professional Soccer League.

== Player ==
=== Youth ===
Tim Tyma, younger brother of John Tyma, graduated from Brecksville-Broadview Heights High School where he was member of the 1975 Ohio State High School soccer championship team. Tyma attended Cleveland State University where he played on the men's soccer team in 1979.

=== Professional ===
Tyma left college after his freshman season to turn professional with the Kansas City Comets of the Major Indoor Soccer League. He spent most of two seasons on the Comets reserve team, seeing time in only four first-team games. In 1984, Klaas de Boer left Cleveland State to become the head coach of the expansion Canton Invaders of the American Indoor Soccer Association. He signed Tyma, who at the time was working odd jobs in the Chicago area. The Invaders won the 1985 AISA championship in his first season there. That summer, Tyma played one game with the Tulsa Tornado's of the outdoor United Soccer League before the bankrupt team and league shut down in the middle of their season. He returned to the indoor game that winter in Canton, where he would help the team repeat as champions in 1986 and finish as runners-up in 1987. That year, Tyma was the AISA Defender of the Year. In January 1988, the Invaders traded him and Pete Smith to the Milwaukee Wave in exchange for Randy Pikuzinski. Tyma went on to be named the 1988 and 1989 AISA Defender of the Year with the Wave. On October 23, 1991, the Wave sold Tyma's contract to the Illinois Thunder. On June 17, 1992, the Wave purchased Tyma's contract back from the Thunder. However, a few weeks later, Wave coach Keith Tozer decided to return Tyma's rights to the Thunder who failed to protect him in the expansion draft. The Cleveland Crunch then selected him in the draft and he signed with the Crunch in September 1992. He played five seasons with the Crunch. A knee injury suffered during the 1996–1997 season eventually led to surgery just prior to the 1997–1998 season. The Crunch activated him off the injured list in January 1998, but he was unable to play and was waived a month later.

== Coach ==
On July 30, 1996, Tyma signed a two-year contract with the Cleveland Crunch as a player-coach. Currently Tyma is an assistant coach for the girls varsity team at North Royalton High School in North Royalton, Ohio, in suburban Cleveland.

== Referee ==
Following his retirement from playing, Tyma became a referee in the National Professional Soccer League and later in the college ranks. He continues to serve as a professional indoor soccer referee.

He was inducted into the Illinois State Soccer Association Hall of Fame in 1992.
