= Zoran Savić (soccer) =

Serbian footballer

Zoran Savic
Personal information
- Date of birth: August 13, 1959 (age 67)
- Place of birth: Gornji Milanovac, Yugoslavia (now Serbia)
- Position: Forward

Senior career*
Years	Team	Apps	(Gls)
1980–1982	Buffalo Stallions (indoor)	43	(19)
1981	Cleveland Cobras	25	(9)
1982–1984	Kansas City Comets (indoor)	110	(70)
1983	Oklahoma City Slickers		
1984–1985	Los Angeles Lazers (indoor)	31	(9)
1986–1987	Louisville Thunder (indoor)	81	(88)
1987–1988	Los Angeles Lazers (indoor)	39	(7)
1988	Tampa Bay Rowdies		
1988–1989	Milwaukee Wave (indoor)	36	(31)
1989–1990	Orlando Lions		
1989	Memphis Rogues (indoor)		
1989–1991	Atlanta Attack (indoor)	64	(82)
1991	Albany Capitals	8	(2)
1991–1992	Kansas City Attack (indoor)	21	(26)

Managerial career
- 1992–1996: Kansas City Attack
- 2000–2005: Kansas City Comets
- 2007–2008: Chivas USA (assistant)
- 2009–2024: Sporting Kansas City (assistant)
- * Club domestic league appearances and goals

Zoran Savic (Serbo-Croatian: [zǒran sâʋitɕ]; born 13 August 1959) is a retired Serbian American soccer player who played at the forward position. He played professionally in the first Major Indoor Soccer League. He later played in the second and third American Soccer League then the American Professional Soccer League and the American Indoor Soccer Association. He is a professional coach and previously was an assistant coach at Sporting Kansas City of Major League Soccer.

== Playing career ==
In 1980, Savic signed with the Buffalo Stallions of the Major Indoor Soccer League and played two seasons with the team. In 1981, he played outdoor soccer with the Cleveland Cobras. On June 18, 1982, he was signed with the Kansas City Comets of Major Indoor Soccer League and played two seasons with the team. In May 1983 he joined the Oklahoma City Slickers of the American Soccer League.

On July 31, 1987, Zoran signed with the Los Angeles Lazers. On October 19, 1989, the Milwaukee Wave traded Savic to the Memphis Storm team for money and the Wave's first and second-round picks in the 1990 Amateur Draft. He began the 1989–90 season with the team, but was later traded to the Atlanta Attack in exchange for Glenn Lurie on December 29, 1989. In 1991, he played for the Albany Capitals of the American Professional Soccer League.

== Yearly Awards ==
- AISA Top Points Scorer 1985–86
- AISA All-Star Team 1985–86, 1986–87
- NPSL Coach of the Year 1994–95
