= Jamie Swanner =

American soccer player and coach

Personal information
- Full name: James Swanner
- Date of birth: January 13, 1961 (age 65)
- Place of birth: St. Louis, Missouri, U.S.
- Height: 6 ft 3 in (1.91 m)
- Position: Goalkeeper

College career
| Years | Team | Apps | (Gls) |
| 1980–1983 | Clemson Tigers | | |

Senior career*
| Years | Team | Apps | (Gls) |
| 1985–1992 | Canton Invaders (indoor) | | |
| 1992–1994 | Buffalo Blizzard (indoor) | 78 | (0) |
| 1994–2000 | St. Louis Ambush (indoor) | 186 | (0) |
| 2000–2001 | Kansas City Attack (indoor) | 12 | (0) |
| 2008–2010 | St. Louis Illusion (indoor) | | |

International career
| 1984 | United States | 1 | (0) |

Managerial career
- 1988–1992: Central Catholic Crusaders
- 1997–????: Duchesne Pioneers (assistant)
- 1997–????: Lewis & Clark Trailblazers (assistant)
- 1999–2000: St. Louis Ambush
- 2008–2010: St. Louis Illusion
- 2015–: St. Louis Ambush (assistant)
- 2015–: Washington University Bears (assistant)
- 2015–: McKendree Bearcats (women's assistant)
- * Club domestic league appearances and goals

James Swanner (born January 13, 1961) is a retired U.S. soccer goalkeeper and current soccer coach. He was a member of the 1984 U.S. Olympic soccer team and earned one cap with the U.S. national team in 1984. He spent his entire professional career playing indoor soccer.

== Playing career ==
=== High school and college ===
Swanner attended Southwest High School in St. Louis. After graduating from high school, Swanner attended Clemson University, where he played as a goalkeeper on the men's soccer team. In 1983, his senior season, he earned first-team All-American honors and was named the ISAA Goalkeeper of the Year. He also lettered in baseball at Clemson in 1983.

=== National and Olympic teams ===
Swanner represented the U.S. at the 1983 Pan American Games, playing in a 1–2 first round loss to Chile and joined the U.S. Olympic soccer team as it prepared for the 1984 Summer Olympics. Swanner earned his only cap with the U.S. national team when he came on for Winston DuBose in a December 2 tie with Ecuador.

=== Professional ===
When Swanner expressed his intentions to enter the pros, the Canton Invaders of the American Indoor Soccer Association (AISA) drafted him in the first round. Swanner immediately became a prominent indoor goalkeeper, winning Rookie of the Year for the 1985–86 season. Swanner would be named the AISA Goalkeeper of the Year for the 1986–87, 1988–89, 1989–90, 1990–91 and 1991–92 seasons. He was also named to the All AISA team in 1987, 1989, 1990, 1991, and 1992. He was also the league MVP for 1989–90 and 1991–92. While playing with the Invaders, the AISA was renamed as the National Professional Soccer League (NPSL) in 1990. During his seven seasons with the Invaders, the team won four championships.

Despite Swanner's amazing success with the Invaders, he left the team at the end of the 1991–1992 season to join the Buffalo Blizzard of the NPSL. Swanner failed to achieve the same level of success with the Blizzard as he had with the Invaders. However, he remained with the Blizzard for only two seasons before moving to the St. Louis Ambush in 1994 for the next six seasons. The move to St. Louis saw a resurgence for Swanner as he was named All NPSL in 1995 and was the NPSL Goalkeeper of the Year for the 1994–95 season. Swanner won yet another championship as the Ambush swept the Harrisburg Heat four games to none in the NPSL championship series. In 1999, Swanner replaced Daryl Doran as the head coach of the Ambush. While he had not intended to continue playing, he was forced into that role when the team's goalkeeper was injured. The Ambush folded at the end of the 1999–2000 season and Swanner moved to the Kansas City Attack to play as a goalkeeper, but saw little playing time and retired at the end of the season. When Swanner finished his time in professional soccer, he topped the AISA/NPSL career list with 296 wins & 10 shutouts. Other notable career stats: scored 9 goals and 98 assists (as a goalkeeper)

In November 2008, Swanner came out of retirement when he installed himself as a goalkeeper on the St. Louis Illusion of the Professional Arena Soccer League. Swanner is the owner of the Illusion.

== Coaching ==
While Swanner had spent a year as a professional coach with the Ambush in the 1999–2000 season, that was not his first coaching experience. He was the head coach of Central Catholic High School in Canton, Ohio from 1988 to 1992. In 1997, he became an assistant coach with both the Duchesne High School and Lewis and Clark Community College teams.

Swanner was the co-owner of The Game, an indoor soccer arena in Glen Carbon, Illinois. Swanner owns the Professional Arena Soccer League St. Louis Illusion who played their games at The Game Arena in Glen Carbon, Illinois.
