= Dayton Dynamo (1988–1995) =

- Founded: 1988
- Dissolved: 1995
- League: National Professional Soccer League's American Division

The Dayton Dynamo was a professional indoor soccer team from Dayton, Ohio. The team played in the American Indoor Soccer Association (AISA).

Founded by former University of Dayton and Central State University coach Jerry Butcher, the Dynamo joined the AISA as one of two expansion franchises (the other being the Jacksonville Generals) playing in the 1987–88 post-season "Challenge Cup" Series. The franchise began regular-season play at Hara Arena starting with the 1988–89 season and moved to the Ervin J. Nutter Center at Wright State University for the 1990–91 season. The Dynamo played its last two seasons in Dayton at the 4,600 seat capacity Dayton Convention Center.

The Dynamo finished last in the league during the team's first two seasons. In the 1989–90 season, the Dynamo won the National Division, but the squad lost to the Canton Invaders of Canton, Ohio, in the championship series. The team returned to the championship round the following season, losing to the Chicago Power this time. During the 1991–92 season, the Dynamo, now in the National Professional Soccer League's American Division, finished last. Over the next three seasons, the team finished no higher than fifth in its division. Declining support from Dayton fans prompted the Dynamo to relocate to Cincinnati, Ohio, at the end of the 1994–95 season. The move also prompted a name change and the squad became known as the Cincinnati Silverbacks.

In 2015, the Cincinnati Saints announced that they would relocate to Dayton and operate as an outdoor team renamed in honor of the old indoor team for the 2016 season.

== Dynamo year-by-year ==
Year	GP	W	L	%	GB	GF	GA	League	Division	Playoffs	Avg. attendance
1988 (Chall. Cup)	12	3	9	.250	6	46	63	AISA	N/A	Challenge Cup	2,716
1988–89	40	14	26	.350	11	328	350	AISA	N/A	Did not qualify	2,158
1989–90	40	21	19	.525		388	354	AISA	1st, National	Playoff runner-up	
1990–91	40	21	19	.525	2	465	478	NPSL	3rd, National	Playoff runner-up	
1991–92	40	9	31	.225	14	479	593	NPSL	4th, American	Did not qualify	
1992–93	40	20	20	.500	7	562	584	NPSL	5th, American	Did not qualify	3,904
1993–94	40	15	25	.375	11	653	665	NPSL	6th, American	Did not qualify	3,218
1994–95	40	15	25	.375	15	548	671	NPSL	5th, American	Did not qualify	3,227

== Silverbacks year-by-year ==
See: Cincinnati Silverbacks
