= Canton Invaders =

- Founded: 1984; 41 years ago
- Dissolved: 1997; 28 years ago
- Ground: Canton Memorial Civic Center
- Capacity: 5,200

The Canton Invaders was an indoor soccer club based in Canton, Ohio that competed in the National Professional Soccer League. After the 1995–96 season, the team relocated and became the Columbus Invaders.

== History ==
The Canton Invaders were a professional indoor soccer team from Canton, Ohio. Named by Michael George of Canton, Ohio. One of the charter members of the American Indoor Soccer Association (AISA), they played their home contests in the Canton Civic Center, a municipal owned facility in the downtown area of Canton, Ohio.

The Invaders and the AISA began play in 1984 with six teams (Chicago Vultures, Canton Invaders, Columbus Capitals, Kalamazoo Kangaroos, Louisville Thunder, and Milwaukee Wave). The Invaders won the league championships for the 1984–85 and 1985–86 seasons as well as advancing to the championship series for the 1986–87 campaign only to be defeated by their opponent of the previous two championship contests, the Louisville (KY) Thunder. (Footnote: The Louisville Thunder folded following the 1986–87 season.)

The following three seasons saw the Canton Invaders again capture the league championship crown but their attendance dwindled. A group of diehard fans continued to come to the home games and the seats behind one goal area became known as The Twilight Zone with spectators dressing in dark colored clothing and face painting for the Invaders’ motif. The area behind the other goal was actually the stage for the Canton Civic Center and no spectators were permitted to sit there during games.

Prior to the 1990–91 season, the league set about reinventing itself as the National Professional Soccer League (NPSL). Ten teams now reached from New York to Milwaukee and south to Jacksonville. In an effort to make the games more equitable, players were traded amongst the teams and the Canton squad’s ability to win a majority of their games was eliminated. Canton never again hoisted the championship banner in the Civic Center and for the 1996–97 season, the team relocated to Columbus where they compiled a dismal 5 and 35 record finishing dead last in the Central Division of the American Conference of the NPSL. The Invaders disbanded following one season in Columbus and players were distributed to the remaining dozen teams of the league.

The Invaders had a rivalry with the nearby Cleveland Crunch for their last five seasons of play.

The National Professional Soccer League continued operations for ten more seasons before officially folding operations. The ten teams of the league then established a re-structured league to be known as the Major Indoor Soccer League.

== Coaches ==
- (United States) Klaas de Boer (1984–85)
- (England) Trevor Dawkins (1985–88)
- (United States) (Greece) Steve M. Paxos (1988)
- (Finland) Timo Liekoski (1989–1992)

== Athletic trainers ==
- Alex Villoneuva (1993–1995)
- John D Smith (1995–1996)

== Yearly awards ==
AISA Season MVP

- 1985–1986 – Don Tobin
- 1986–1987 – Rudy Pikuzinski
- 1987–1988 – Rudy Pikuzinski
- 1988–1989 – Rudy Pikuzinski
- 1989–1990 – Jamie Swanner

NPSL Season MVP

- 1991–1992 – Jamie Swanner

AISA Coach of the Year

- 1984–1985 – Klass De Boer
- 1985–1986 – Trevor Dawkins

AISA Defender of the Year

- 1984–1985 – Oscar Pisano
- 1985–1986 – Oscar Pisano
- 1986–1987 – Tim Tyma

NPSL Defender of the Year

- 1990–91 – Denzil Antonio

AISA Rookie of the Year

- 1986-1986 – Jamie Swanner

AISA leading goal scorer

- 1986–1987 – Rudy Pikuzinski (51 Goals)
- 1987–1988 – Rudy Pikuzinski (24 Goals)

AISA leading points scorer

- 1986–1987 – Rudy Pikuzinski (81 Points)
- 1987–1988 – Rudy Pikuzinski (42 Points)

AISA Goalkeeper of the Year

- 1986–1987 – Jamie Swanner
- 1988–1989 – Jamie Swanner
- 1989–1990 – Jamie Swanner

NPSL Goalkeeper of the Year

- 1990–1991 – Jamie Swanner
- 1991–1992 – Jamie Swanner

AISA All-Star Team

- 1984–1985 – Kia Zolgharnain, Oscar Pisano
- 1985–1986 – Oscar Pisano, Kia Zolgharnain, Tim Tyma, Don Tobin
- 1986–1987 – Jamie Swanner, Rudy Pikuzinski, Tim Tyma
- 1987–1988 – Rudy Pikuzinski
- 1988–1989 – Rudy Pikuzinski, Jamie Swanner
- 1989–1990 – Jamie Swanner, Rudy Pikuzinski

NPSL All-Star Team

- 1990–1991 – Jamie Swanner, Denzil Antonio, Gino DiFlorio
- 1991–1992 – Jamie Swanner

== Year-by-year ==
Year	Division	League	Reg. season	Playoffs	Avg. attendance
1984–85	2	AISA	1st	Champions	2,326
1985–86	2	AISA	1st	Champions	2,917
1986–87	2	AISA	1st, Northern	Final	3,294
1987–88	2	AISA	2nd	1st in Challenge Cup	TBA
1988–89	2	AISA	1st	Champions	TBA
1989–90	2	AISA	1st, American	Champions	TBA
1990–91	2	NPSL	1st, American	Semifinals	2,459
1991–92	2	NPSL	1st, American	Final	2,128
1992–93	1	NPSL	7th, American	Did not qualify	2,072
1993–94	1	NPSL	5th, American	Did not qualify	2,399
1994–95	1	NPSL	6th, American	Did not qualify	1,781
1995–96	1	NPSL	7th, American	Did not qualify	1,626
1996–97	1	NPSL	3rd, American Central	Did not qualify	1,588
