= Columbus Capitals =

American indoor soccer club

The Columbus Capitals were an indoor soccer club based in Columbus, Ohio, that competed in the American Indoor Soccer Association. The club played its home games at the Columbus Convention Center from 1984 to 1986, then known as the Battelle Hall.

== Individual honours ==
- Leading Goal scorer

Lesh Shkreli (1984–85) 59 Goals

- Leading Point Scorer

Lesh Shkreli (1984–85) 103 Points

== Year-by-year ==
Year	Division	League	Reg. season	Playoffs	Avg. attendance
1984–85	2	AISA	2nd	Semifinals	1,373
1985–86	2	AISA	5th	Did not qualify	1,385
