= Chicago Power =

American indoor soccer team

- Full name: Chicago Power
- Founded: 1988
- Dissolved: 1996
- Ground: UIC Pavilion; Rosemont Horizon
- Capacity: 8,378
- Owner: Ron Bergstrom
- League: National Professional Soccer League; American Indoor Soccer Association

The Chicago Power were an indoor soccer team based in Chicago, Illinois, that competed in the American Indoor Soccer Association and National Professional Soccer League.

After the 1995–96 season, the team was sold to Peter Pocklington, moved and became the Edmonton Drillers.

== Year-by-year ==
Year	Division	League	Reg. season	Playoffs	Avg. attendance
1988–89	2	AISA	3rd	Final	
1989–90	2	AISA	3rd, National	1st Round	3,602
1990–91	2	NPSL	1st, National	Champions	2,459
1991–92	2	NPSL	1st, National	Semifinals	4,612
1992–93	1	NPSL	3rd, National	1st Round	4,909
1993–94	1	NPSL	5th, National	Did not qualify	4,515
1994–95	1	NPSL	6th, National	Did not qualify	3,333
1995–96	1	NPSL	6th, National	Did not qualify	2,847

== Outdoor play ==
Although the Power was primarily known only as an indoor team, in the summer of 1992 they formed a full outdoor squad. Home matches were played at St. Charles High School's Norris Stadium and at Hanson Stadium on the Northwest Side. In addition to several exhibition matches they participated in the 1992 Professional Cup alongside five APSL and two CSL clubs. Chicago also took part in another international series dubbed Copa Chicago '92 which included Liga MX's Tecos F.C. and Tigres UANL and the APSL's Miami Freedom. They finished last in both competitions. In eight outdoor matches that year the Power won only once, lost five times, while drawing twice. In 1993 several other APSL clubs joined them in summer outdoor play.

=== 1992 Outdoor results ===
Date	Opponent	Venue	Result	Attendance	Goal Scorers	Ref.
June 21, 1992	Colorado Foxes	Englewood Stadium	0–2			
June 27, 1992	Colorado Foxes	Norris Stadium	1–1	1,479	Batata	
July 10, 1992	Tigres UANL (Mexico)	Hanson Stadium	1–2	3,000 est.	Richard Cordosa	
July 12, 1992	Miami Freedom	Hanson Stadium	1–3	3,200 est.	Art Wywrot	
July 22, 1992	San Francisco Bay Blackhawks	Buck Shaw Stadium	0–2	2,050		
July 27, 1992	Torpedo Minsk (Belarus)	East McCully Field	1–0		Batata	
August 8, 1992	Cruz Azul (Mexico)	Hanson Stadium	2–2	7,000 est.	Pato Margetic, Mirko Castillo	
August 19, 1992	San Francisco Bay Blackhawks	Norris Stadium	2–3		Ken Snow, Pato Margetic	

== Notable players ==
- Randy Soderman
- Rick Soderman
- Patricio Margetic

== Media coverage ==
The Chicago Power appeared locally, on SportsChannel Chicago. Howard Balson and Kenny Stern were the primary broadcast team in Chicago.
