= National Professional Soccer League (1984–2001) =

Former indoor soccer league

- Founded: April 18, 1984 (as AISA)
- Folded: 2001
- Country: United States; Canada
- Number of clubs: 15
- Last champions: Milwaukee Wave (2000–01)

The National Professional Soccer League was a professional indoor soccer league in the U.S. and Canada. It was originally called the American Indoor Soccer Association.

== History ==
In November 1983, a Kalamazoo, Michigan–based group called Soccer Leagues Unlimited unveiled a plan for an indoor league composed exclusively of American players. The group's president, Bob Lemieux (later AISA commissioner), announced that Kalamazoo, Fort Wayne, Indiana, and Springfield, Illinois, were on board in what was he said was intended to be a sort of farm system, or developmental league, for the well established Major Indoor Soccer League. He added that groups in Indianapolis, Peoria, and Michigan cities, Saginaw and Flint; Kentucky cities, Lexington and Louisville; Ohio cities, Columbus Toledo and Dayton; Erie, PA; and Green Bay, Wisconsin, were all interested in joining the league.

Officially starting on April 18, 1984, the American Indoor Soccer Association's charter franchises were Chicago, Milwaukee, Kalamazoo and Fort Wayne; however, a Fort Wayne team did not materialize until the league's third season. Three other teams, Louisville, Canton and Columbus, all joined the league before the first season began in November 1984.

In 1990, the league changed its name to the National Professional Soccer League. Over its 17 seasons, a total of 30 franchises in 32 cities were part of the league at one time or another. During the summer of 2001, the league disbanded and the six surviving teams formed the second incarnation of the Major Indoor Soccer League.

When the league began in 1984, game rules were almost identical compared to the larger and more popular Major Indoor Soccer League. Beginning with the 1988–89 season, the AISA changed their scoring system. Goals were now worth 1, 2, or 3 points depending upon distance or game situation. Basically, all non-power play goals scored from inside the yellow line were worth 2 points while non-powerplay goals from outside the yellow line (50 feet from the goal line) were worth 3 points. Any power play goal was worth 1 point, as was any goal scored during a penalty shootout. Before the 1994–1995 season, the three-point line was changed to a 45-foot arc. Eventually, power play goals were worth either two or three points, but penalty shootouts were still kept at one point.

== Teams ==
- Baltimore Blast (1992–2008), as Baltimore Spirit from 1992 to 1998
- Buffalo Blizzard (1992–2001)
- Chicago Shoccers (1984–87), as Chicago Vultures in 1984–85
- Cincinnati Silverbacks (1995–98), as Dayton Dynamo from 1988 to 1995
- Cleveland Force (1992–2005), as Cleveland Crunch from 1992 to 2002
- Columbus Capitals (1984–86)
- Columbus Invaders (1984–97), as Canton Invaders from 1984 to 1996, absorbed by Montreal Impact before 1997–98
- Denver Thunder (1990–93), as Illinois Thunder from 1990 to 1992
- Detroit Rockers (1990–2001)
- Edmonton Drillers (1988–2001), as Chicago Power from 1988 to 1996
- Florida ThunderCats (1998–99)
- Fort Wayne Flames (1986–89)
- Harrisburg Heat (1991–2001)
- Hershey Impact (1988–91)
- Jacksonville Generals (1988)
- Kalamazoo Kangaroos (1984–86)
- Kansas City Comets (1989–2004), as Kansas City Attack from 1991 to 2001, as Atlanta Attack from 1989 to 1991
- Louisville Thunder (1984–87)
- Memphis Rogues (1986–90), as Memphis Storm from 1986 to 1989
- Milwaukee Wave (1984–2008)
- Montreal Impact (1997–2000)
- New York Kick (1990–91, as Indiana Kick in 1989–90
- Philadelphia KiXX (1996–2001)
- St. Louis Ambush (1991–2000), as Tulsa Ambush in 1991–92
- Tampa Bay Rowdies (1986–87)
- Tampa Bay Terror (1995–97)
- Toledo Pride (1986–87)
- Toronto Shooting Stars (1996–97)
- Toronto ThunderHawks (2000–01)
- Wichita Wings (1992–2001)

== Champions by season ==
| SEASON | CHAMPION | RUNNER-UP | SERIES |
|---|---|---|---|
| 1984–85 | Canton Invaders | Louisville Thunder | 3–1 |
| 1985–86 | Canton Invaders | Louisville Thunder | 3–0 |
| 1986–87 | Louisville Thunder | Canton Invaders | 3–2 |
| 1987–88 | Canton Invaders | Ft. Wayne Flames | (Challenge Cup) |
| 1988–89 | Canton Invaders | Chicago Power | 3–2 |
| 1989–90 | Canton Invaders | Dayton Dynamo | 3–1 |
| 1990–91 | Chicago Power | Dayton Dynamo | 3–0 |
| 1991–92 | Detroit Rockers | Canton Invaders | 3–2 |
| 1992–93 | Kansas City Attack | Cleveland Crunch | 3–2 |
| 1993–94 | Cleveland Crunch | St. Louis Ambush | 3–1 |
| 1994–95 | St. Louis Ambush | Harrisburg Heat | 4–0 |
| 1995–96 | Cleveland Crunch | Kansas City Attack | 4–2 |
| 1996–97 | Kansas City Attack | Cleveland Crunch | 4–0 |
| 1997–98 | Milwaukee Wave | St. Louis Ambush | 4–1 |
| 1998–99 | Cleveland Crunch | St. Louis Ambush | 3–2 |
| 1999–2000 | Milwaukee Wave | Cleveland Crunch | 3–2 |
| 2000–01 | Milwaukee Wave | Philadelphia KiXX | 3–0 |

== Championships won ==
| TEAM | TITLES | SEASONS | RUNNER-UP |
|---|---|---|---|
| Canton Invaders → Columbus Invaders → Montreal Impact | 5 | 84–85, 85–86, 87–88, 88–89, 89–90 | 86–87, 91–92 |
| Cleveland Crunch | 3 | 93–94, 95–96, 98–99 | 92–93, 96–97, 99–00 |
| Milwaukee Wave | 3 | 97–98, 99–00, 00–01 | – |
| Atlanta Attack → Kansas City Attack | 2 | 92–93, 96–97 | 95–96 |
| Louisville Thunder | 1 | 86–87 | 84–85, 85–86 |
| Chicago Power | 1 | 90–91 | 88–89 |
| Detroit Rockers | 1 | 91–92 | – |
| Tulsa Ambush → St. Louis Ambush | 1 | 94–95 | 93–94, 97–98, 98–99 |
| Dayton Dynamo → Cincinnati Silverbacks | 0 | – | 89–90, 90–91 |
| Fort Wayne Flames | 0 | – | 87–88 |
| Harrisburg Heat | 0 | – | 94–95 |
| Philadelphia KiXX | 0 | – | 00–01 |

== Commissioners ==
- Bob Lemieux 1984–1985
- Joe Machnik 1985–1988
- Steve M. Paxos 1988–2000
- Steve Ryan 2000–2001

== See also ==
- Indoor Football League
- World Indoor Soccer League (1998-2001)
- Major Indoor Soccer League (2001–2008)
