= 1981 American Soccer League =

American Soccer League 1981 season
- Season: 1981
- Teams: 8
- Champions: Carolina Lightnin'
- Premiers: New York United (5th title)
- Top goalscorer: Billy Boljevic (25)

Statistics of American Soccer League II in season 1981.

== League standings ==
Liberty Conference
Team	Pld	W	D	L	GF	GA	BP	Pts
New York United	28	19	4	5	53	28	51	154
Pennsylvania Stoners	28	17	7	4	51	28	47	146
New York Eagles	28	13	2	13	57	49	47	116
New England Sharks	28	4	0	24	16	41	15	35

Freedom Conference
Team	Pld	W	D	L	GF	GA	BP	Pts
Carolina Lightnin'	28	16	3	9	46	31	41	127
Detroit Express	28	15	2	11	58	46	46	125
Rochester Flash	28	11	5	12	38	51	35	100
Cleveland Cobras	28	5	1	22	33	78	29	56

== ASL All-Stars ==
First Team	Position	Second Team
George Taratsides, NY United	G	Scott Manning, Carolina
Chris Tyson, NY United	D	Curtis Leeper, Carolina
Jeff Tipping, Pennsylvania	D	Mack Garrigan, Cleveland
Billy Boljevic, Pennsylvania	D	Fernando Clavijo, NY United
Dennis Mepham, Rochester	D	Redmond Lane, NY United
Don Tobin, Carolina	M	Mike Barry, Cleveland
John Dolinsky, Rochester	M	Rich Reice, Pennsylvania
Steve Westbrook, Detroit	M	Mike Powers, Detroit
Tony Suarez, Carolina	F	Ricky Kren, NY Eagles
Andy Chapman, Detroit	F	Mike Laschev, Rochester
Billy Boljevic, NY Eagles	F	Mal Roche, Carolina

== Playoffs ==
=== Bracket ===
First round (single match)
Detroit Express	4
New York Eagles	1
Carolina Lightnin'	2
Rochester Flash	0

Division finals (2-match aggregate)
New York United	1	1(4)	2
Detroit Express	1	1(2)	2
Pennsylvania Stoners	1	2	3
Carolina Lightnin'	3	1	4

ASL Championship Final (single match)
New York United	1
Carolina Lightnin'	2

=== 1st Round ===
September 3	Carolina Lightnin'	2–0	Rochester Flash	Memorial Stadium • Att. 5,312

September 4	Detroit Express	4–1	New York Eagles	Pontiac Silverdome • Att. 7,318

=== Semifinals ===
Higher Seed	Aggregate	Lower Seed	First leg	Second leg	Attendance
Carolina Lightnin'	4–3	Pennsylvania Stoners	3–1	1–2	September 5 • Memorial Stadium • 6,021; September 9 • ASD Stadium • 2,207
New York United	2–2 (4–2)	Detroit Express	1–1	1–1 PK (4–2)	September 8 • Pontiac Silverdome • 3,414; September 10 • Hofstra Stadium • 1,274

=== Championship final ===
September 18, 1981
8:05 EDT

Carolina Lightnin' (NC)	2–1(OT)	New York United (NY)
Don Tobin 69'; Hugh O'Neill 115'	Report	Soloman Hilton 64'

Memorial Stadium, Charlotte, North Carolina
Attendance: 20,163
Referee: (USA)

== Post season awards ==
- Most Valuable Player: (Socialist Federal Republic of Yugoslavia) Billy Boljevic, NY Eagles
- Coach of the year: (Northern Ireland) Jimmy McGeough, NY United
- Rookie of the year: (Cuba) Tony Suarez, Carolina
- Executive of the Year: (United States) Robert Benson, Carolina
