= 1980 American Soccer League =

American Soccer League 1980 season
- Season: 1980
- Teams: 8
- Champions: Pennsylvania Stoners
- Premiers: Pennsylvania Stoners
- Top goalscorer: Mal Roche (17)

Statistics of American Soccer League II in season 1980.

== League standings ==
National Conference
Team	Pld	W	D	L	GF	GA	BP	Pts
Pennsylvania Stoners	28	19	4	5	50	29	43	146
New York United	28	17	0	11	48	34	43	128
Cleveland Cobras	28	12	2	14	47	47	38	102
Columbus Magic	28	11	3	14	34	31	32	93

American Conference
Team	Pld	W	D	L	GF	GA	BP	Pts
Sacramento Gold/Spirit (Note: Sacramento Gold folded during the season and replaced by Spirit franchise.)	29	11	2	16	41	40	44	103
California Sunshine	26	11	1	14	40	53	42	99
Miami Americans	28	10	3	15	54	45	41	97
Golden Gate Gales	27	8	5	14	60	37	43	93

== ASL All-Stars ==
First Team	Position	Second Team
Scott Manning, Pennsylvania	G	Tom Reynolds, Sacramento
Daniel Mammana, Cleveland	D	Eric Smith, Pennsylvania
Ramon Moraldo, California	D	Redmond Lane, New York
George Gorleku, Pennsylvania	D	Mario Concha, New York
Jeff Tipping, Pennsylvania	D	Ernesto Vallejos, Miami
Willie Munguia, California	M	Adrian Brooks, Pennsylvania
Don Tobin, California	M	Walter Schlothauer, Cleveland
Fernando Clavijo, New York	M	Clyde Watson, Pennsylvania
Ian Filby, Pennsylvania	F	Carlos Volpini, Golden Gate
Mal Roche, Golden Gate	F	Charlie Greene, Miami
Narciso Doval, New York	F	Jimmy Rolland, California

== Playoffs ==
=== Bracket ===
Conference finals (2-match aggregate)
N1	Pennsylvania Stoners	1	3	4
N2	New York United	1	1	2
A1	Sacramento Spirit	4	1	5
A2	California Sunshine	3	1	4

ASL Championship final (single match)
N1	Pennsylvania Stoners	2
A1	Sacramento Spirit	1

=== Conference finals ===
Higher Seed	Aggregate	Lower Seed	First leg	Second leg	Attendance
Pennsylvania Stoners	4–2	New York United	1–1	3–1	September 12 • Downing Stadium • ??? September 14 • ASD Stadium • 8,139
Sacramento Spirit	5–4	California Sunshine	4–3	1–1 (OT)	September 10 • Santa Ana Bowl • 155; September 14 • Hughes Stadium • 2,942

=== Championship final ===
September 18, 1980
7:05 EST

Pennsylvania Stoners (PA)	2–1	Sacramento Spirit (CA)
George Gorleku 38:20'; Rich Reice 69:03' (McDermott)	Report 1 Report 2	Malcolm Filby 86:20' (pen.)

ASD Stadium, Allentown, Pennsylvania
Attendance: 7,723
Referee: Shaya Starobin (USA)
