= Ernie Buriano =

Argentine-American footballer

Personal information
- Date of birth: July 24, 1957 (age 69)
- Place of birth: Colón, Argentina
- Height: 5 ft 9 in (1.75 m)
- Positions: Midfielder; defender

Senior career*
Years	Team	Apps	(Gls)
1979	Las Vegas Seagulls		
1979–1984	Buffalo Stallions (indoor)	177	(86)
1980	Miami Americans		
1982	Rochester Flash		
1984	Buffalo Storm		
1984–1987	Baltimore Blast (indoor)	94	(28)
1987–1988	Chicago Sting (indoor)	76	(13)
1993–1995	Buffalo Blizzard (indoor)	53	(11)

Managerial career
- 2000: Buffalo Blizzard (assistant)
- * Club domestic league appearances and goals

Ernie Buriano (born July 24, 1957) is a retired Argentine-American footballer. He played in the Major Indoor Soccer League, United Soccer League, American Soccer League and National Professional Soccer League

In 1979, he signed with the expansion Buffalo Stallions of the Major Indoor Soccer League. He spent five seasons with the Stallions, leaving the team only after it folded. In 1982, he played for the Rochester Flash. After the Stallions folded, Buriano spent the 1984 outdoor season with the Buffalo Storm of the United Soccer League. In October 1984, he signed with the Baltimore Blast. On January 9, 1987, the Blast traded Buriano and Frantz Mathieu to the Chicago Sting in exchange for Drago Dumbovic. The Sting released Buriano and ten other players in June 1988. Buriano moved his family back to Argentina that summer where he continued to play and coach. He eventually returned to the United States and became a citizen in the early 1990s. In 1993, he signed with the Buffalo Blizzard of the National Professional Soccer League. He played two seasons in Buffalo. In 1996, Buriano and his wife opened a Jani-King cleaning franchise in Buffalo. In November 2000, the Buffalo Blizzard hired Buriano as an assistant coach.
