= 1982 American Soccer League =

American Soccer League 1982 season
- Season: 1982
- Teams: 7
- Champions: Detroit Express
- Premiers: Detroit Express
- 1983 CONCACAF Champions' Cup: Detroit Express
- Top goalscorer: Andy Chapman (23)

Statistics of the American Soccer League II for the 1982 season.

== League standings ==
Pos	Team	Pld	W	D	L	GF	GA	BP	Pts
1	Detroit Express	28	19	4	5	59	37	41	144
2	Oklahoma City Slickers	28	19	3	6	58	42	37	138
3	Georgia Generals	25	12	4	9	55	40	47	115
4	Carolina Lightnin'	28	11	4	13	37	45	36	99
5	Rochester Flash	27	10	2	15	48	53	30	84
6	Pennsylvania Stoners	26	8	5	13	34	44	31	81
7	Nashville Diamonds	28	3	4	21	25	67	18	41

Source: rsssf.com

Note: Numerous errors in the table above.

== Playoffs ==
=== Bracket ===
First round (aggregate)
3	Georgia Generals	-	-	X
6	Pennsylvania Stoners*	-	-	forfeit
4	Carolina Lightnin'	3	3	6
5	Rochester Flash	1	1	2

Semi-finals (Best-of-3)
1	Detroit Express	2	2(4)	1
3	Georgia Generals	1	2(5)	0
2	Oklahoma City Slickers	1(4)	3	x
4	Carolina Lightnin'	1(3)	0	x

ASL Championship (Best-of-3)
1	Detroit Express	1	2	4
2	Oklahoma City Slickers	3	0	1

=== 1st Round ===
Higher Seed	Aggregate	Lower Seed	First leg	Second leg	Attendance
Carolina Lightnin'	6–2	Rochester Flash	3–1	3–1	September 3 • Memorial Stadium • 3,703; September 8 • Holleder Memorial Stadium • 2,654
Georgia Generals	forfeit	Pennsylvania Stoners	x	x	*(Pennsylvania forfeits series)

=== Semi-finals ===
Higher seed	Series	Lower seed	Game 1	Game 2	Game 3	Attendance
Oklahoma City Slickers	2–0	Carolina Lightnin'	1–1 (4–3)	3–0	x	September 10 • Memorial Stadium • 3,855; September 12 • Taft Stadium • 3,500
Detroit Express	2–1	Georgia Generals	2–1	2–2 (4–5)	1–0	September 7 • DeKalb Memorial Stadium • 500; September 8 • Pontiac Silverdome • 400; September 9 • Pontiac Silverdome • 800

=== ASL Championship ===
Higher seed	Series	Lower seed	Game 1	Game 2	Game 3	Attendance
Detroit Express	2–1	Oklahoma City Slickers	1–3	2–0	4–1	September 18 • Pontiac Silverdome • 10,678; September 19 • Taft Stadium • 7,500; September 22 • Pontiac Silverdome • 23,726 or 33,762
