= Buffalo Storm =

Defunct American soccer team

Buffalo Storm (Logo)

Buffalo Storm were an American professional soccer team. They played for one season (1984) in the United Soccer League, with home games at All-High Stadium.

== History ==
The early 1980s were a lean and difficult time for professional outdoor soccer in the United States. The North American Soccer League was in significant decline following the boom years of the late 1970s, undone by a period of over-expansion and overspending that created an unstable environment in which teams were constantly folding or moving to new cities. By 1984, only nine teams were left in the league (down from a peak of twenty-four in 1980). The de facto second division American Soccer League had likewise doomed itself to instability and difficult economic realities when it expanded beyond the northeastern United States, where it had operated very modestly since 1933, and tried to establish a foothold on the west coast in the '70s and southern states in the '80s. These expansions produced a string of short-lived franchises, and the league had contracted to only six teams in 1983.

At the ASL's annual meetings in January 1984, chronic instability and frustration over a power structure that allowed inactive owners to still influence the direction of the league led the owners of the Jacksonville Tea Men and Dallas Americans to break away and start planning a new second division organization, which they named the United Soccer League. Their vision was to have franchises operate within their means and take a more grass roots approach to building a fan base in their communities. Year-round operation (with an indoor season in the winter), a strict salary cap, a focus on American players and a mostly regional schedule to reduce travel costs were all pillars on which this new league was to be founded. Three ASL clubs would end up coming directly to the USL, while two other clubs were re-organized and renamed for USL membership. Four new teams also joined the league, one of which would be the Buffalo Storm.

The new Buffalo team was led by two men whose history together dated back to the defunct Rochester Lancers of the NASL. Owner Sal DeRosa had been the Lancers' head coach for a few years in the '70s (including for their 1970 championship season), and he chose former Lancers all-star midfielder Francisco "Pancho" Escos to be the Storm's coach. They officially announced their existence in April.

== The 1984 Season ==
In between working together in Rochester and founding the Storm, DeRosa and Escos were both part of the Buffalo Stallions of the Major Indoor Soccer League (DeRosa as vice president and GM, Escos as a player), and they took advantage of this connection when assembling their new team. Eleven Stallions players would moonlight that summer with the Storm. Buffalo was placed into the USL's Northern Division along with the New York Nationals and Rochester Flash. Their season began on May 19 with a 2–1 loss at Jacksonville. Despite the hastiness with which the franchise was put together, local media made a remarkably strong effort to lend their support to the town's newest team. The Buffalo News covered all matches, and radio station WBNY carried live coverage of the games, with Dave Wexler handling play-by-play duties. There were even three matches televised (on tape delay) on local cable Channel 10.

The Storm would be a middle of the pack team in the league as a whole, finishing with an 11–13 record. Rochester and New York would both post worse records, though, and the Storm ended up qualifying for the playoffs as division winners, earning them a best-of-three semifinals matchup with the Fort Lauderdale Sun. The playoff format called for the lower seed to host the first game of the series and for the higher seed to host the second and third games. But All High Stadium's lack of lights would have forced Game 1 to kick off at 5:00 on a weeknight, and Sal DeRosa, citing the small crowd that was likely to turn up in these circumstances, chose to surrender the right to host. The Sun swept the Storm out of the playoffs down in Florida by scores of 3-0 and 5-1.

== The Storm's End ==
The Storm faced two substantial challenges in joining the upstart USL. The first was that they only had about six weeks in between announcing their existence and the beginning of league play, leaving little time to drum up sponsors, investors or fans. The other was having to attract crowds to daytime or early evening games during the summer's hottest months. Official attendance figures were not kept, but one contemporary media source listed the average attendance for Storm home games at less than 1,000 fans per game. The Storm were simply not able to balance the books in these conditions, but they were hardly alone. Despite the league's financial austerity measures, all of its teams finished the first season in the red. The winter indoor schedule that had been discussed at the league's founding never materialized, and all but one franchise failed to submit a performance bond to prove their readiness for a 1985 outdoor season by the February deadline. Shortly after desperate last-minute discussions about a possible USL/NASL merger fell apart in March, the NASL cancelled its upcoming season, and Buffalo joined four other USL teams in shutting down operations. The four teams that attempted a 1985 USL season were only able to complete six weeks of play before they also went bankrupt and folded. Meanwhile, the MISL's Stallions had "suspended" operations the previous July to re-organize but ultimately never re-started, so the folding of the Storm left Buffalo without any professional soccer until the formation of the Buffalo Blizzard in the indoor NPSL in 1992.

== Players ==
- (United States) Dennis Mepham 1984
- (United States) Randy Pikuzinski 1984
- (United States) Rudy Pikuzinski 1984
- (United States) Otto Orf 1984
- (United States) Dave Lischner 1984
- (United States) Pat Occhiuto 1984
- (Argentina) Carlos Salguero 1984
- (Argentina) Ernesto Buriano 1984
- (Argentina) Oscar Pisano 1984
- (Haiti) Herve Guilliod 1984
- (Denmark) Niels Guldbjerg 1984
