= Franklin Lawson =

American soccer player and coach

Personal information
- Place of birth: Jersey City, New Jersey, U.S.
- Position: Striker

Youth career
- Belmont Abbey College

Senior career*
Years	Team	Apps	(Gls)
1981–1982	Nashville Diamonds		
1983	Pennsylvania Stoners		
1984	Charlotte Gold		
- New York Arrows (indoor)
1984	New York Nationals		
1985	United Soccer League		
- Atlanta Lightning (indoor)
1986	Atlanta Datagraphic		
2012	Atlanta Silverbacks		

Managerial career
- Georgia Perimeter College (assistant)
- OFC Black (head)
- OFC Red (head)
- * Club domestic league appearances and goals

Franklin Lawson is an American retired soccer player who played professionally in the American Soccer League and the United Soccer League.

Raised in Old Bridge Township, New Jersey, Lawson graduated from Cedar Ridge High School. He then attended Belmont Abbey College where he graduated in 1977.

He turned professional in 1981 with the Nashville Diamonds of the American Soccer League. He played for the Pennsylvania Stoners and Charlotte Gold in 1984. He spent time with the New York Arrows of the Major Indoor Soccer League. He played for the New York Nationals in the United Soccer League. He finished his professional career with the Atlanta Lightning of the SISL. He later played for Atlanta Datagraphic. He served as an assistant with the Georgia Perimeter College women's soccer team from the 1990s until recently. He coached for the OFC Black team and led them to a five-win season and a semifinal appearance in the Athens Finale in 2014. The team finished on the brink of promotion with 27 points. He is currently a coach of the 06 boys team of the CSC youth soccer club in Anchorage, Alaska.
