= Waldir de Souza =

Brazilian footballer (born 1952)

Personal information
- Date of birth: 7 June 1952 (age 74)
- Place of birth: São Paulo, Brazil
- Height: 1.83 m (6 ft 0 in)
- Position: Defender

Senior career*
Years	Team	Apps	(Gls)
1970–1975	Palmeiras		
1976–1978	Windsor Stars		
1979	New York Eagles		
1979–1980	Detroit Lightning (indoor)	20	(4)
1980–1982	Baltimore Blast (indoor)	39	(13)
1981–1982	Kansas City Comets (indoor)	37	(12)
1982–1983	Phoenix Inferno (indoor)	43	(4)
1983–1984	Buffalo Stallions (indoor)	12	(0)
1984	Charlotte Gold		
1984–1985	Columbus Capitals (indoor)	16	(1)
1986–1987	Windsor Wheels		
1989–1990	Windsor Wheels		
1991	Windsor Wheels		

Managerial career
- 1992: Windsor Wheels
- 1994: Detroit Wheels
- * Club domestic league appearances and goals

Waldir de Souza (born 7 June 1952) is a Brazilian former football player and manager who played as a defender.

== Playing career ==
DeSouza played with Sociedade Esportiva Palmeiras in the Campeonato Brasileiro Série A. In 1976, he played abroad in the National Soccer League with Windsor Stars. In his debut season he was selected for the NSL Selects team. He re-signed with Windsor for the 1977 season and also played in the 1978 season. In 1979, he played in the American Soccer League with New York Eagles.

In the winter of 1979, he played in the Major Indoor Soccer League with Detroit Lightning. The following season, he signed with league rivals Baltimore Blast. After a season in Baltimore he was released and signed with the Kansas City Comets. In 1982, he was traded to the Phoenix Inferno, and later played with Buffalo Stallions. In 1984, he played in the American Indoor Soccer Association with Columbus Capitals.

In the summer of 1984, he played in the United Soccer League with Charlotte Gold. In 1986, he returned to the National Soccer League to play with Windsor Wheels. The following he assisted in securing the regular season title for Windsor. After a years, absence he returned to Windsor for the 1989 season. In 1990, he departed from Windsor after a dispute with management over missed payments.

After his departure from Windsor, he played with Caboto Sting in the Michigan-Ontario League where he assisted in securing the Ontario Cup. He subsequently returned to Windsor for the 1991 season.

== Managerial career ==
In 1992, he transitioned into the managerial side and became the head coach for the Windsor Wheels in the National Soccer League. In 1994, he served as an assistant coach under Mike Francis for the Detroit Wheels in the United States Interregional Soccer League. He later was elevated to the head coach position. He would also serve as an assistant coach for the Michigan Wolverines men's soccer.
