= Mark Snell =

American soccer player-coach

Personal information
- Date of birth: February 23, 1958 (age 68)
- Place of birth: Lockport, New York, United States
- Height: 6 ft 2 in (1.88 m)
- Position: Goalkeeper

Youth career
- 1976–1979: Hartwick College

Senior career*
Years	Team	Apps	(Gls)
1980–1982	Edmonton Drillers	0	(0)
1980–1981	→ Viersen (loan)		
1982–1983	Buffalo Stallions (indoor)	2	(0)
1983–1985	Wichita Wings (indoor)	6	(0)

Managerial career
- 1998–1999: New York East ODP
- 1998–2003: Hartwick College (assistant coach)
- 2003: Storm Soccer Club (Youth Academy Director)
- 2004: Dallas Inter Soccer Club (Academy Coach)
- 2004–2012: FC Dallas (Juniors Academy Director)
- 2014–2017: Fort Worth Vaqueros
- 2017–present: Fort Worth Vaqueros (Youth Academy Director)
- * Club domestic league appearances and goals

Mark Snell (born February 23, 1958) is an American retired professional soccer player who played as a goalkeeper. Snell played professionally in the North American Soccer League and the Major Indoor Soccer League and coached in the FC Dallas youth system for eight years, and is widely considered one of the top youth development coaches in the country for Zone 1 (6–12 yr olds).

== Player ==
Snell graduated from Lockport Senior High School where he was a 1975 High School All American soccer player and held the school record for shutouts (10) in one season for over 30 years. In 2009 Snell was inducted into the Lockport High School Athletic Hall of Fame. He attended Hartwick College where he played for Head Coach Jim Lennox on the school's soccer team from 1976 to 1979. In 1977, Snell and his teammates won the NCAA Men's Division I Soccer Championship. In 1979 Snell and fellow goalkeeper Aly Anderson set the school record for shutouts (10) in a season with each having five. Snell credits his mentor Jim Lennox as the most influential person in his coaching career as he spent 4 years with him as a player and 5 as an assistant.

In 1980, he signed with the Edmonton Drillers of the North American Soccer League who sent him on loan to 1. FC Viersen 05, a 3rd division German team. Kicker Magazine cited Snell as the only American at that time playing in the top 3 divisions in Germany. While there he was able to train with Borussia Monchengladbach In 1981, he joined the Buffalo Stallions of the Major Indoor Soccer League before finishing his career in 1985 with the Wichita Wings.

== Youth coaching ==
During his tenure at FC Dallas, Snell developed a curriculum that included teaching age-appropriate tactics through small-sided games for ages U7-U11. Snell's philosophy was that the "best train with the best", and created the Premier team format which grouped all of the top players in each age group into one team. Initially, players of all levels were scattered across many teams within each age group. Snell felt the best development model was having teams made up of "like" talent so that training would be competitive for all teams regardless of talent level. He also authored and managed the street soccer-based "FCD LIGA" which was a 3v3/4v4 house league for FC Dallas players on Sundays. He grew the wildly successful program from 5 teams to over 30 teams to preach the small-sided game's format to all the coaches as the best player development tool. He also organized and managed the FC Dallas Development League which hosted the top U9 teams in the Dallas Metroplex. Snell's training methodology was heavily influenced through TGFU, Constraints Led Approach (CLA) and Games Based Learning.

== Coaching career ==
In 1996, Snell became the freshman team coach at Canisius High School in Buffalo, NY. That year, he led the freshman team to an undefeated season and the league championship.

In 1998, Snell returned to his alma mater and became an assistant with Hartwick College. and also joined the Region 1 ODP Staff. In January 2003, Jim Lennox unexpectedly resigned as head coach of the Hawks (Warriors) and Snell became the interim head coach. The school chose to hire Ian McIntyre before the 2003 season began and Snell left the school to begin a career in club coaching. After spending time with the FC Dallas youth teams for eight years, Snell set off on an 18-month sabbatical where he researched and studied youth academies worldwide. Through his research, he befriended coaches around the globe and also studied Pep Guardiola's "Juego de Posicion" (Positional Play) system. Snell discovered that his philosophy of teaching age-appropriate tactics starting at the younger ages through small-sided games was actually based on Positional Play. In 2014, Snell became the inaugural head coach of Fort Worth Vaqueros FC of the National Premier Soccer League. Recently, Snell has been named Academy Director of the Fort Worth Vaqueros new youth academy where they are set to announce a free academy in the summer of 2018 for the most talented players in the Fort Worth area. A new Vaqueros Field at Sycamore Park (2400 East Vickery Blvd Fort Worth, Texas 76104) is being built through a partnership with the City of Fort Worth and set to be completed in May 2018.

Snell has numerous credentials such as a US Soccer Federation A License, a US Youth Soccer National Youth License and an NSCAA Premier Diploma. Ten of Snell's former FC Dallas players have been called up by the youth national teams of the USA, Colombia, Bosnia & Herzegovina and Guatemala, while 2 former players have signed professional contracts with FC Dallas.

Snell is currently the Academy Director of the Fort Worth Vaqueros.
