= Reice =

Reice is a name. Notable people with this name include:

- Naomi Reice Buchwald (born 1944), American judge
- Reice Charles-Cook (born 1994), English football player
- Reice Hamel (1920–1986), American sound technician
- Rich Reice, American American football player
