= József Horváth (footballer, born 1949) =

Hungarian footballer

Personal information
- Date of birth: 21 May 1949 (age 77)
- Place of birth: Budapest, Hungary
- Position: Midfielder

Senior career*
Years	Team	Apps	(Gls)
1968–1975	Újpesti Dózsa	138	(17)
1977–1978	Rot-Weiss Essen	14	(0)
1978	Rochester Lancers	29	(6)
1979–1980	Washington Diplomats	39	(12)
1979–1980	Buffalo Stallions (indoor)	25	(17)
1980–1981	San Jose Earthquakes (indoor)	9	(6)
1981	San Jose Earthquakes	27	(3)
1981–1982	New Jersey Rockets (indoor)	27	(10)
1982	Rochester Flash	19	(1)
1983	Pennsylvania Stoners		
1984	Rochester Flash	9	(3)

International career
1973–1975	Hungary	11	(1)

Managerial career
- 1984: Rochester Flash
- * Club domestic league appearances and goals

József Horváth (born 21 May 1949) is a Hungarian former footballer.

== Career ==
Horváth played for Újpest FC and Rot-Weiss Essen, and in the North American Soccer League between 1978 and 1981 for the Rochester Lancers, Washington Diplomats and San Jose Earthquakes.

He played at the international level for Hungary. Horváth also spent time in the American Soccer League, United Soccer League, and played indoor soccer in both the NASL and Major Indoor Soccer League.
