= Paonessa =

Paonessa is an Italian surname. Notable people with the surname include:

- Alessandra Paonessa (born 1989), Canadian opera singer
- Franco Paonessa (born 1959), Italian–American soccer player
- Gabriele Paonessa (born 1987), Italian soccer player
- Mario Paonessa (born 1990), Italian rower
