= Occhiuto =

Occhiuto is a surname. Notable people with the surname include:

- Josephine Occhiuto, known as Joy Behar (born 1942), American comedian, television host, actress, and writer
- Mario Occhiuto (born 1964), Italian politician and architect
- Roberto Occhiuto (born 1969), Italian politician
- Pat Occhiuto (born 1957), Italian-American soccer player
