= Herve Guilliod =

Haitian footballer (born 1956)

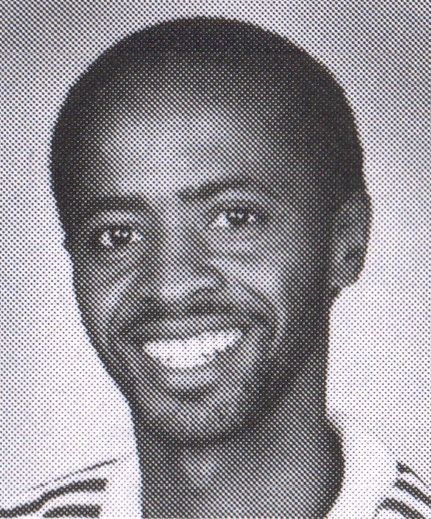
- Guilliod circa 1984

Personal information
- Date of birth: November 18, 1956 (age 69)
- Place of birth: Port-au-Prince, Haiti
- Height: 6 ft 1 in (1.85 m)
- Position: Forward

College career
Years	Team	Apps	(Gls)
1973–1976	Fredonia Blue Devils		

Senior career*
Years	Team	Apps	(Gls)
1977–1978	New York Eagles		
1979	New York Apollo		
1979–1980	Hartford Hellions (indoor)	17	(12)
1980–1981	Chicago Horizon (indoor)	9	(10)
1983–1984	Buffalo Stallions (indoor)	135	(95)
1985	Fort Lauderdale Sun		
1984–1985	Dallas Sidekicks (indoor)	35	(11)
- * Club domestic league appearances and goals

Herve Guilliod (born November 18, 1956) is a retired Haitian soccer forward who played in both the American Soccer League and Major Indoor Soccer League.

He graduated from Fredonia State University where he had played soccer from 1973 to 1976. In 1977, the New York Eagles of the American Soccer League drafted Guilliod. He spent two seasons with the Eagles, one season with the New York Apollo in 1979, then moved indoors with the Hartford Hellions of the Major Indoor Soccer League in the fall of 1979. He later played for the Buffalo Stallions. On August 2, 1984, the Dallas Sidekicks purchased Guilliod's contract from the Stallions. He scored the first-ever regular season goal in Sidekicks' history. After being released from the Sidekicks on March 7, 1985, Guilliod played for the Fort Lauderdale Sun in the United Soccer League. He also became a coach in the Garland, Texas area. He founded the Garland Strikers youth club in 1994. He remains there today as President, Coaching Director, and Head Coach of the '07 Girls team North Texas Strikers 07G Blue.
