= New York Nationals =

New York Nationals may refer to:

- New York Nationals, a basketball team – another name for the Washington Generals in their games against the Harlem Globetrotters
- New York Nationals (ASL) – a 1920s New York soccer team.
- New York Nationals (USL) – a 1980s New York soccer team.
- New York Nationals – "nickname" in New York City media for the New York Mets (1962–present) and New York Giants (1883–1957) teams in the National League.
