= Gehling =

Gehling is a surname. Notable people with the surname include:

- Bill Gehling (born 1951), Australian rules footballer
- Drew Gehling (born 1982), American actor
- Keith Gehling (born 1956), American soccer player

== See also ==
- Gerling (surname)
