= Soloman =

Soloman is a given name and surname. Notable people with the name include:

- Soloman Hilton, American soccer forward
- Colette Solomon, South African policy researcher and women's rights activist
- Jason Soloman (born 1970), English professional footballer
- Roger Soloman (1939–2021), Canadian provincial politician and educator
- Soloman Sprecher von Bernegg (1697–1758), Habsburg military commander

== See also ==
- Solomon (disambiguation)
- Suleiman, a name, including a list of variants
- Solo Man, a subspecies of H. erectus
