= Dale Baxter =

Canadian soccer player

Personal information
- Date of birth: 22 September 1961 (age 65)
- Place of birth: Luton, England
- Position: Goalkeeper

Senior career*
Years	Team	Apps	(Gls)
1980–1981	Toronto Blizzard		
1981	Washington Diplomats	1	(0)
1981	Detroit Express		
1982–1983	Toronto Italia		
1983	Mississauga Croatia		
1985–1986	Toronto Italia		

International career
1980	Canada U20	6	(0)
- * Club domestic league appearances and goals

Dale Baxter (born 22 September 1961) is a former soccer player who played as a goalkeeper. Born in England, he represented Canada at youth level.

== Career ==
Baxter played in the North American Soccer League in 1980 with Toronto Blizzards indoor team. The following season he was traded to the Washington Diplomats, and made his debut on 9 May 1981 against Tampa Bay Rowdies. In 1981, he played in the American Soccer League with Detroit Express. In 1982, he played in the National Soccer League with Toronto Italia. He received a trial with Toronto Blizzard in 1983, but failed to secure a contract.

In 1983, he played in the Canadian Professional Soccer League with Mississauga Croatia. The CPSL failed to complete their season and as a result folded which allowed for Baxter to play in the National Soccer League with former team Toronto Italia for the remainder of the season. In 1985, he assisted in securing the NSL Championship for Toronto Italia. The following season he assisted Toronto in defending their NSL Championship.

== International career ==
Baxter played with the Canada men's national under-20 soccer team, and featured in the 1980 CONCACAF U-20 Tournament.
