= Ian Fairbrother =

English footballer (born 1966)

Personal information
- Full name: Ian Andrew Fairbrother
- Date of birth: 2 October 1966 (age 60)
- Place of birth: Bootle, England
- Height: 5 ft 10 in (1.78 m)
- Positions: Midfielder; defender

Youth career
- Manchester United
- Blackburn Rovers

Senior career*
Years	Team	Apps	(Gls)
1984–1986	Liverpool	0	(0)
1986–1988	Bury	26	(3)
1987–1988	→ Wrexham (loan)	7	(0)
1988	Fort Lauderdale Strikers	0	(0)
1989	Wichita Blue		
1989–1991	Wichita Wings (indoor)	34	(0)
1990	Miami Freedom		
1991–1994	Detroit Rockers (indoor)		
1994–1997	Detroit Neon (indoor)		
1997	Detroit Safari (indoor)		

Managerial career
- 1997: Detroit Safari (interim)
- * Club domestic league appearances and goals

Ian Fairbrother (born 2 October 1966) is an English retired footballer. He spent the majority of his career in the United States.

He spent his youth career with Manchester United and Blackburn Rovers, but began his professional career in 1984 with Liverpool. He never played any games for Liverpool's first team, and moved to Bury on a free transfer in 1986. In 1988, he moved to the United States to play for the Fort Lauderdale Strikers in the American Soccer League. However, he is not listed with Fort Lauderdale's first team that year. During the summer of 1989, he played for the amateur Wichita Blue in the Heartland Soccer League. On 14 December 1989, he signed with the Wichita Wings of the Major Indoor Soccer League. In May 1990, he joined the Miami Freedom in the American Professional Soccer League. He returned to the Wings in August 1990, but lost the first two months of the MISL season after having an emergency appendectomy. He returned in December and played out the remainder of the season. In 1991, he moved to the Detroit Rockers in the National Professional Soccer League. The Rockers won the 1991-1992 league championship. He played only five games, scoring two goals, with the Rockers during the 1992–1993 season before losing the rest of the season to tendinitis of his Achilles tendon. He returned for the 1993–1994 season, scoring 23 goals in 38 games. In 1994, he moved to the expansion Detroit Neon which played summer indoor soccer in the Continental Indoor Soccer League. Fairbrother remained with Detroit through the 1997 season. That year, the team was renamed the Detroit Safari. In August 1997, he served as the team's interim coach.
