= Pat Occhiuto =

Italian-American soccer player

Personal information
- Date of birth: August 20, 1957 (age 69)
- Place of birth: Italy
- Positions: Forward; midfielder

Youth career
- 1975–1976: Erie Community College
- 1977–1979: SUNY Fredonia

Senior career*
Years	Team	Apps	(Gls)
1979–1981	Buffalo Stallions (indoor)	46	(11)
1981	Rochester Flash		
1981–1982	Kansas City Comets (indoor)	15	(0)
1982–1983	Buffalo Stallions (indoor)	7	(1)
1984	Buffalo Storm		
1991–1994	Buffalo Blizzard (indoor)		
- * Club domestic league appearances and goals

Pat Occhiuto is a retired Italian-American soccer forward who played professionally in the American Soccer League, United Soccer League, Major Indoor Soccer League and National Professional Soccer League.

Occhiuto attended Erie Community College where he played soccer in 1975 and 1976. He was inducted into the Erie Community College Hall of Fame in 1998. He then transferred to SUNY Fredonia where he completed his collegiate soccer eligibility with three seasons on the men's soccer team. In 1989, the school inducted Occhiuto into its Athletic Hall of Fame. In 1979, he signed with the Buffalo Stallions of the Major Indoor Soccer League. In 1981, he played for the Rochester Flash of the American Soccer League. That fall, he moved to the Kansas City Comets before returning to the Stallions for one more season. In 1984, he played for the Buffalo Storm of the United Soccer League. Occhiuto later played for the Buffalo Blizzard of the National Professional Soccer League.
