= Dennis Mepham =

American soccer player (born 1958)

Personal information
- Date of birth: January 28, 1958 (age 68)
- Place of birth: Cortland, New York, U.S.
- Position: Defender

Youth career
- 1976–1979: Bowling Green Falcons

Senior career*
Years	Team	Apps	(Gls)
1980	Rochester Lancers	30	(0)
1980–1984	Buffalo Stallions (indoor)	164	(46)
1981–1983	Rochester Flash		
1984	Buffalo Storm		
1984–1988	Cleveland Force (indoor)	173	(52)
1989–1990	Cleveland Crunch (indoor)	47	(6)
- * Club domestic league appearances and goals

Dennis Mepham (born January 28, 1958) is an American retired soccer defender who played professionally in the North American Soccer League, American Soccer League, United Soccer League and Major Indoor Soccer League

== Youth ==
Mepham attended Brighton High School where he was an outstanding basketball and soccer player. He then attended Bowling Green State University, where he played basketball for two years and soccer for four. When he graduated, he held the team record for both career and single season scoring with 25 and 11 goals respectively. He graduated with a bachelor's degree in finance in 1980 and was inducted into the BGSU Athletic Hall of Fame in 1986.

== Professional ==
The Rochester Lancers of the North American Soccer League drafted Mepham in 1980. When the Lancers folded at the end of the 1980 outdoor season, Mepham joined the Buffalo Stallions of the Major Indoor Soccer League, and he would play with the Stallions until the end of the 1983/84 season. When the Rochester Flash started as an expansion team in the American Soccer League in 1981, Mepham signed with them and spent the summers of 1981 and 82 moonlighting outdoors with the Flash. When the Flash went dormant for the 1983 season, Mepham also took the summer off from outdoor soccer, but he returned to the outdoor game with the Buffalo Storm of the United Soccer League in 1984. In August 1984, the Stallions sold Mepham's contract to the Cleveland Force. He was a regular with the Force until the 1987–1988 season when he suffered from a hairline fracture to his leg bone. In June 1988, the Force released Mepham after he refused to take a 25% reduction in pay. Mepham then went into the real estate business in Cleveland. In the summer of 1989, he signed with the expansion Cleveland Crunch. The Crunch released Mepham in June 1990. He retired from playing professionally that summer.

== Yearly Awards ==
- 1981 ASL All-Star Team
- 1983 MISL All-Star Team
