= Nelson Cupello =

American soccer coach (born 1951)

Personal information
- Full name: Nelson A. Cupello
- Date of birth: August 28, 1951 (age 75)
- Place of birth: Brazil
- Position: Defender

College career
Years	Team	Apps	(Gls)
1971–1972	Monroe Tribunes		
1973–1974	Brockport Golden Eagles		

Senior career*
Years	Team	Apps	(Gls)
1975–1980	Rochester Lancers	37	(1)
1981–1983	Rochester Flash		

Managerial career
- 1978–1984: Monroe Tribunes (assistant)
- 1985–1990: Fredonia Blue Devils
- 1990–: Monroe Tribunes
- 2023: Flower City Union (assistant)
- * Club domestic league appearances and goals

Nelson A. Cupello (born August 28, 1951) is a Brazilian collegiate soccer coach and former player. As a defender he played five seasons in the North American Soccer League and three in the American Soccer League. He currently coaches the Monroe Community College men's soccer team.

== College career ==
Cupello began his collegiate soccer career at Monroe Community College. He transferred to SUNY Brockport in 1973 and played two seasons with Brockport. In 1974, the school won the Division III NCAA Championship. He earned third team All-American recognition in 1974 and graduated in 1975. Cupello was inducted into SUNY Brockport Hall of Fame in 1993 and the NJCAA Soccer Hall of Fame in 2002.

== Professional career ==
The Rochester Lancers of the North American Soccer League drafted Cupello in 1975. He went on to play five seasons with the Lancers. The Lancers folded at the end of the 1980 season. In 1981, Cupello joined the expansion Rochester Flash of the American Soccer League. He retired from playing professionally in 1983.

== Coaching career ==
Cupello began coaching in 1978 when he became an assistant coach with the Monroe Community College men's soccer team. He held that position through the 1984 season, but with his retirement from playing professionally, he moved full-time into coaching. In 1985, SUNY Fredonia hired Cupello as its head coach. In his five seasons with Fredonia, he took the team to the NCAA tournament four times, twice losing in the semifinals. In 1990, he returned to Monroe where he became the school's head coach. He is a 12-time Region III Coach of the Year and three-time Northeast District Coach of the Year, taking the Tribunes to the Regional title in 1995, 2002, 2004, 2006, 2007, 2009, 2010, 2011, and 2012. Hss overall record at MCC currently stands at 303–101–27.

In 2012, Cupello led the Tribunes to an 18-1-1 record, and a third-place finish at the NJCAA Division I National Tournament. On January 18, 2013, Cupello was named the NSCAA National Coach of the Year.

In 2003, became the Director of Coaching at the Rochester Futbol Club which Cupello and Charlie Williams had founded in 1997.
