= Tad DeLorm =

German-born American soccer player

Personal information
- Date of birth: December 7, 1955 (age 70)
- Place of birth: Trier, West Germany
- Position: Goalkeeper

Youth career
- 1974–1977: Keene State College

Senior career*
| Years | Team | Apps | (Gls) |
| 1978 | Colorado Caribous | 2 | (0) |
| 1979 | Atlanta Chiefs | 3 | (0) |
| 1979–1980 | Atlanta Chiefs indoor | 14 | (0) |
| 1980 | Minnesota Kicks | 6 | (0) |
| 1980–1981 | Minnesota Kicks indoor | 7 | (0) |
| 1981–1983 | Detroit Express | 73 | (0) |
- * Club domestic league appearances and goals

Tad DeLorm (born December 7, 1955) is a German-born American retired football (soccer) goalkeeper who played three seasons in the North American Soccer League and three in the American Soccer League. He now works at Classical Magnet School in Hartford, Connecticut. He is a soccer and baseball coach.

== College ==
DeLorm attended Keene State College where he was a 1977 NAIA first team All American. That year, Keene went to the NAIA national men's soccer championship where they lost to Quincy University. In December 1996, Keene State inducted DeLorm into the school's Athletic Hall of Fame.

== Professional ==
In 1978, DeLorm turned professional with the Colorado Caribous in the North American Soccer League. He played two games, both as a substitute. The Caribous moved to Atlanta where they were renamed the Atlanta Chiefs for the 1979 season. In 1980, DeLorm moved to the Minnesota Kicks. In 1981, he signed with the Detroit Express of the American Soccer League. He played for them through at least 1983. In 1982, he was the ASL's top goalkeeper.

== Yearly awards ==
- ASL Leading Goalkeeper: 1982
