= Tom Reynolds (soccer) =

American soccer player

Personal information
- Date of birth: September 6, 1955 (age 71)
- Place of birth: Alameda, California, U.S.
- Position: Goalkeeper

Senior career*
Years	Team	Apps	(Gls)
1977–1978	Dallas Tornado	5	(0)
1978–1979	Los Angeles Aztecs (indoor)	0	(0)
1979	California Sunshine	22	(0)
1980	Sacramento Gold	23	(0)
1980–1981	San Francisco Fog (indoor)	26	(0)
1981–1982	Pennsylvania Stoners		
- * Club domestic league appearances and goals

Tom D. Reynolds is an American retired soccer goalkeeper who played two seasons in the North American Soccer League, one in the Major Indoor Soccer League and at least four in the American Soccer League.

In 1977, Reynolds signed with the Dallas Tornado of the North American Soccer League. He played five games that season, but none in 1978. Moving to the Los Angeles Aztecs for the 1978-1979 NASL Indoor season, he was released without having played any games. He then signed with the California Sunshine of the American Soccer League. He led the league with a 0.79 goals against average. He spent the 1980 season with the Sacramento Gold, ranking only behind Scott Manning in GAA. Reynolds spent 1980 & 1981 with the Major Indoor Soccer League as a Keeper for the San Francisco Fog. He then moved to the Pennsylvania Stoners for the 1981 ASL season. That year, he again led the ASL in goalkeeping with a 0.89 GAA. He played for the Stoners through at least 1982.

== Awards ==
- ASL All-Star Team Selection: 1979
- ASL Leading Goalkeeper: 1979, 1981
