= Pat Fidelia =

Soccer player (born 1959)

Personal information
- Full name: Patrick Fidelia
- Date of birth: April 16, 1959 (age 67)
- Place of birth: Port-au-Prince, Haiti
- Position: Forward

Youth career
- Mercer County College

Senior career*
Years	Team	Apps	(Gls)
1978–1980	Philadelphia Fury	46	(17)
1979–1980	Cleveland Force (indoor)	29	(10)
1981	Montreal Manic	6	(0)
1981–1982	Philadelphia Fever (indoor)	6	(0)
1982–1983	Carolina Lightnin'		
1984	Charlotte Gold		

International career
1979	United States	1	(0)
- * Club domestic league appearances and goals

Pat Fidelia (born April 16, 1959) is a former soccer forward who spent four seasons in the North American Soccer League, two in the American Soccer League and one in the United Soccer League. Born in Haiti, he earned one cap playing for the United States national team.

== Early life ==
Fidelia was born in Port-au-Prince, Haiti and moved to the United States as a child, settling in Mount Holly, New Jersey and graduating in 1976 from Rancocas Valley Regional High School. He then attended Mercer County Community College.

== Playing career ==
=== Professional ===
The Houston Hurricane of the North American Soccer League (NASL) drafted Fidelia with the last pick (96th overall) of the 1978 Draft. It then traded him to the Philadelphia Fury. While playing as a substitute for most of the 1978 season with the Fury, Fidelia led the team in scoring with eight goals. The Fury folded at the end of the 1980 season and Fidelia moved to the Montreal Manic for the 1981 season. In 1979, he signed with the Cleveland Force of the Major Indoor Soccer League, playing 29 games for the team during the 1979–1980 season. In 1982, Fidelia left the NASL for the Carolina Lightnin' of the American Soccer League. He scored eight goals that season. The ASL folded following the 1983 season and the Lightnin' jumped to the United Soccer League, changing its name to the Charlotte Gold. The Gold lasted only the 1984 season before folding. Fidelia retired from playing professionally.

==== National team ====
Fidelia earned his one cap with the national team in a 3–1 win over Bermuda on October 7, 1979, when he came on for Greg Villa.

==== Amateur ====
Fidelia continued to play for amateur teams in the Charlotte Amateur Soccer League. In the late 1980s he played for Fish Fare and was with Pepsi in 1990.

== Coaching career ==
After retiring from playing, Fidelia coached high school soccer at Charlotte Christian. In April 1989, he resigned, but was hired by Christ School in Arden, NC and then coached at Carolina Day School in Asheville, NC. He currently coaches youth soccer at Charlotte Rise FC, serving across the Charlotte metro and surrounding areas.
