= Keith Gehling =

American soccer player

Personal information
- Date of birth: January 24, 1956 (age 70)
- Place of birth: Granite City, Illinois, U.S.
- Position: Defender

Youth career
- 1973: Washington Huskies
- 1976–1977: Rockhurst College

Senior career*
| Years | Team | Apps | (Gls) |
| 1979–1982 | Wichita Wings (indoor) | 98 | (8) |
| 1980 | California Sunshine | | |
| 1981 | New York Eagles | | |
| 1982 | Rochester Flash | | |
| 1983 | Oklahoma City Slickers | | |
- * Club domestic league appearances and goals

Keith Gehling (born January 24, 1956) is an American retired soccer defender who played professionally in the Major Indoor Soccer League and the American Soccer League.

In 1973, Gehling played one season at the University of Washington. In 1976, Gehling returned to college at Rockhurst College. That season Rockhurst finished runner-up in the NAIA national men's soccer championship. In 1977, Gehling was an NAIA All American. In 2005, Rockhurst inducted Gehling into its Hall of Fame. Following his graduation from Rockhurst, Gehling spent two years in sales. In 1979, Gehling attended an open tryout for the expansion Wichita Wings of the Major Indoor Soccer League. He won a contract and went on to spend three seasons with the Wings. In addition to his indoor career with the Wings, Gehling spent four seasons in the American Soccer League with a different team each season (California Sunshine, New York Eagles, Rochester Flash and Oklahoma City Slickers).
