= Drago Dumbovic =

Croatian footballer (born 1960)

Personal information
- Date of birth: February 5, 1960 (age 66)
- Place of birth: Zagreb, PR Croatia, FPR Yugoslavia
- Position: Forward

Senior career*
Years	Team	Apps	(Gls)
1979–1983	Dinamo Zagreb	37	(4)
1983–1984	Pittsburgh Spirit (indoor)	37	(32)
1984–1985	Wichita Wings (indoor)	12	(3)
1984–1986	Minnesota Strikers (indoor)	46	(27)
1985–1987	Chicago Sting (indoor)	45	(44)
1986–1988	Baltimore Blast (indoor)	74	(47)
1989	Maryland Bays		
1989–1990	Hershey Impact (indoor)	22	(28)
1989–1991	Atlanta Attack (indoor)		
1990	Washington Diplomats		
1990–1994	Detroit Rockers (indoor)	41	(69)
1991	Windsor Wheels		
1994–1995	Detroit Neon (indoor)		
1995–1996	Pittsburgh Stingers (indoor)		
1995–1996	Detroit Neon (indoor)		
1996–1997	Sacramento Knights (indoor)	23	(12)
1998–1999	Detroit Rockers (indoor)	12	(0)

Managerial career
- 1999–2001: Detroit Rockers (indoor)
- 2003–2012: Saginaw Valley State Cardinals (women)
- * Club domestic league appearances and goals

Drago Dumbovic (born February 5, 1960) is a Croatian former footballer and a head coach. He is noted for playing indoor soccer and the adoption of the nickname Drago in 1986.

== Career ==
Dumbovic played in the Yugoslav First League in 1979 with Dinamo Zagreb. Throughout his tenure with Dinamo he played in the 1979–80 UEFA Cup, 1980–81 European Cup Winners' Cup, and the 1982–83 European Cup. In 1983, he played abroad in the Major Indoor Soccer League with Pittsburgh Spirit. After his stint with Pittsburgh he spent time with Wichita Wings, and Minnesota Strikers. In 1985, he signed with league rivals Chicago Sting, where he began using the nickname Drago and shaved his hair. After two seasons in Chicago he played with the Baltimore Blast in 1986.

In 1989, he played in the American Soccer League with Maryland Bays, and with the Washington Diplomats in 1990. In 1990, he played in the National Professional Soccer League with Atlanta Attack, and later with the Detroit Rockers. During his time in Detroit he assisted in securing the NPSL Championship in the 1991–92 season. In 1991, he played in Canada with Windsor Wheels in the National Soccer League. After three seasons with the Rockers he played in Continental Indoor Soccer League with Detroit Neon, and a season with Pittsburgh Stingers and Sacramento Knights.

In 1998, he returned to his former team the Detroit Rockers.

== Managerial career ==
Dumbovic began coaching in the National Professional Soccer League with the Detroit Rockers in the 1998-1999 season as an interim assistant coach for Bryan Finnerty. The following season he was given head coach responsibilities. In 2003, he was appointed the head coach for Saginaw Valley State University's women's soccer team. In 2014, he was named the director for Cleveland United's girl soccer program.

== Honors ==
Detroit Rockers

- NPSL Championship (1): 1991–92
