= Florian Kempf =

American football placekicker (born 1956)

No. 4, 5
- Position: Placekicker

Personal information
- Born: May 25, 1956 (age 70); Philadelphia, Pennsylvania, U.S.
- Listed height: 5 ft 9 in (1.75 m)
- Listed weight: 170 lb (77 kg)

Career information
- High school: Cardinal Dougherty (Philadelphia)
- College: None
- NFL draft: 1978: undrafted

Career history
- New England Patriots (1981)*; Houston Oilers (1982–1984); Houston Oilers (1987)*; Philadelphia Eagles (1987)*; Houston Oilers (1987); New Orleans Saints (1987); New Orleans Saints (1988)*; New Orleans Saints (1989)*
- * Offseason or practice squad member only
- Stats at Pro Football Reference

Florian Kempf
Personal information
- Height: 5 ft 10 in (1.78 m)
- Position: Midfielder

College career
Years	Team	Apps	(Gls)
1977	Penn Quakers		

Senior career*
Years	Team	Apps	(Gls)
1978–1979	Philadelphia Fury	4	(0)
1979	Pennsylvania Stoners		
- * Club domestic league appearances and goals

Florian Gerard Kempf (born May 25, 1956) is an American former professional football placekicker who played four seasons in the National Football League (NFL) with the Houston Oilers and New Orleans Saints. He played college soccer at the University of Pennsylvania. Kempf also played professional soccer for the Philadelphia Fury of the North American Soccer League (NASL) and the Pennsylvania Stoners of the American Soccer League.

== Early life and college ==
Florian Gerard Kempf was born on May 25, 1956, in Philadelphia, Pennsylvania. He attended Cardinal Dougherty High School in Philadelphia and graduated in 1974.

He attended the University of Pennsylvania from 1974 to 1977. He played soccer for the Penn Quakers, earning All-Ivy League honors. He was a letterman in 1977.

== Professional soccer career ==
Kempf played in four games for the Philadelphia Fury of the North American Soccer League (NASL) in 1978 as a midfielder and recorded 274 minutes. He was also a member of the Fury in 1979 but did not record any statistics. He then played in four games for the Pennsylvania Stoners of the American Soccer League (ASL) in 1979 and made one goal.

== Professional football career ==
Kempf signed with the New England Patriots of the National Football League on May 10, 1981. This was the first time in Kempf's life that he had ever been on a football team. He was released on August 18, 1981.

Kempf was signed by the Houston Oilers on February 20, 1982. He played in nine games for the Oilers that season, converting four of six field goals and 16 of 18 extra points. He appeared in all 16 games in 1983, converting 17 of 21 field goals and 33 of 34 extra points. He also recorded a seven-yard reception. Kempf played in nine games in 1984, making four of six field goals and 14 of 14 extra points, before being placed on injured reserve on November 24, 1984. He became a free agent after the season and re-signed with the Oilers on July 4, 1985. He was released by the Oilers on August 20, 1985. He signed with the Oilers again two years later on July 27, 1987, but was released on August 24, 1987.

Kempf signed with the Philadelphia Eagles on August 26, 1987, but was released on September 2, 1987.

On September 23, 1987, he signed with the Oilers during the 1987 NFL players strike. He did not play in any games for the Oilers that season and was soon released.

Kempf then signed with the New Orleans Saints in 1987 and played in one game for the team during the players strike, converting four of five field goals and one of one extra points. He was released by the Saints on October 19, 1987, after the strike ended. He was later re-signed by the Saints on June 19, 1988, but was released on August 15, 1988. He signed with the Saints again the next year on June 6, 1989, but was released again on August 24, 1989.
