= Rochester Flash =

- Full name: Rochester Flash
- Founded: 1981
- Dissolved: 1984; 42 years ago
- Stadium: Holleder Memorial Stadium
- Capacity: 20,000
- Owner(s): Eugene Quatro, Jr., et al.
- Head Coach: Don Lalka, Joe Horvath
- League: American Soccer League (1981–1982); United Soccer League (1984)
Home colors

The Rochester Flash was an American soccer club based in Rochester, New York, that was a member of the American Soccer League from 1981 to 1982 and of the United Soccer League in 1984.

== History ==
Rochester's first experience with professional soccer came in the form of the Rochester Lancers, who joined the second division American Soccer League in 1967. In 1970, the North American Soccer League was down to four teams and on the verge of collapse, and they persuaded the Lancers and the Washington Darts to move up from the ASL to help bring the first division league back from the brink. The Lancers enjoyed immediate success in the NASL, winning the 1970 league championship. As the decade progressed, though, the NASL entered into a period of rapid expansion and ballooning budgets. Large market teams began offering big contracts to aging foreign superstars such as Pelé and Johan Cruyff, and the Lancers struggled to keep up with the rest of the league economically or on the field. The club's founding owners were forced to seek other investors to help them stay afloat. These two factions of ownership fell into disputes in 1980 that landed in court, and the organization racked up debts owed to both players and the league. When they failed to pay their performance bond for the 1981 season, the NASL cut ties with the club and forced them to fold.

The Rochester Flash were formed as an expansion team in the American Soccer League for 1981. Hoping to capitalize on the city's existing base of soccer fans while operating on a more modest budget, the team planned to play at the same home field, Holleder Stadium, that the Lancers had called home. They also brought back three former Lancers players: Craig Reynolds, Nelson Cupello, and Dennis Mepham.

== American Soccer League (1981-82) ==
The 1981 Flash was led by coach Don Lalka and put together a roster that featured several players moonlighting from the Major Indoor Soccer League's Buffalo Stallions in addition to the three holdovers from the Lancers. At their home debut, a promising crowd of about 5,000 turned out, but those numbers would taper off as the season went along. Rochester was almost unbeatable at home, losing only once at Holleder Stadium, but they struggled everywhere else, losing eleven out of fourteen road games. They would finish with an 11-5-12 record. The Flash qualified for the playoffs but had to go on the road for the one game play-in round, where they were eliminated 2–0 by the eventual league champion Carolina Lightnin'. Stallions crossover Mike Laschev led the team in scoring, with thirteen goals.

In 1982, the club brought in several new players, including Franco Paonessa, who would go on to win ASL Rookie of the Year honors. This infusion of young talent did not improve their fortunes as a team, though, and they still finished in the middle of the ASL standings with a record of 10–2–15. The seven-team league allowed six teams to participate in the playoffs, so the Flash did play in the postseason despite their losing record, where the Carolina Lightnin' once again knocked the Flash out down in Charlotte. Ernie Buriano led the team in scoring with nine goals and six assists.

Following the 1982 season, the team was facing the same challenge as virtually every other team in the ASL: revenues were not keeping up with expenses. Rochester chose to go "dormant" for the 1983 season to try to improve its financial situation. This was a status that most ASL clubs who chose it never came back from, but the Flash would defy the odds and announced their intention to field a team again in 1984. However, the ASL was collapsing that winter after a long period of instability and decline, and the Flash would have to pivot to mount their comeback with a new organization, the United Soccer League. The USL was formed when the owners of the Jacksonville Tea Men and Dallas Americans decided to break away from the ASL in an attempt to give their teams a better chance to succeed financially and correct what they saw as fundamental flaws in that league's power structure. By February 1984, the six teams that had been active in the ASL in the previous year had either announced plans to move over to the new league or folded. The Flash management ultimately decided that their best option for playing that year would be to follow the defectors over to the USL, citing the league's reasonable budgets and potential for growth. The ASL ended operations shortly afterwards.

== United Soccer League (1984) ==
The USL kicked off its 1984 season in May with nine teams in three regional divisions. League rules aimed to control costs with a strict salary cap and an imbalanced schedule in which teams would play half of their 24-games within their regional divisions to minimize travel costs. The Flash were members of the Northern Division along with two brand new clubs, the Buffalo Storm and New York Nationals.

When it came time to put a roster together for the resurrected Flash, the team was deprived of the main talent pool that it had tapped previously because most Buffalo Stallions players who were looking for a summer opportunity chose the convenience of staying in Buffalo and playing for the new Storm franchise over commuting to Rochester. The Flash also did not seek out the players that had recently found themselves squeezed out of the shrinking NASL (which had contracted from twenty-four teams in 1980 to nine in 1984). With the exception of player-coach Joe Horvath and Don Tobin, most of the Flash's 1984 roster had limited ASL experience if any at all. The relatively inexperienced Flash had a hard time keeping pace with the rest of the teams in the USL, most of whom had at least a few players on their rosters with experience overseas and/or in the NASL or MISL. They lost their first five games on their way to a final record of 7–17. This was the league’s worst record, and they did not qualify for postseason play.

Following the season, most of the USL teams were faced with the reality that, despite all of the measures the league had taken to keep costs down, they were still losing unsustainable amounts of money. At the league's founding, there were talks of an indoor season in the winter to promote year-round play and connection to communities. This never materialized, and the Flash was one of several teams that failed to post a performance bond for the 1985 outdoor season. After discussions about merging the USL and NASL to keep both leagues from collapsing ended without an agreement in early March, the NASL cancelled its 1985 season and four USL teams (including Buffalo and New York) folded. The Flash declared that they were going dormant again, but this time there would be no resurrection. Four clubs would try to stage a 1985 USL season, but the league would only complete six weeks of play before they were bankrupt and forced to close down. The city would have to wait until the 1996 debut of the second division A-League's Raging Rhinos to have a professional soccer team to support again.

== Yearly Awards ==
- First Team All Star
  - 1981: John Dolinsky, Dennis Mepham
- Rookie of the Year
  - 1982: Franco Paonessa

== Year-by-year ==
Year	Division	League	Reg. season	Playoffs	U.S. Open Cup
1981	2	ASL	3rd, Freedom	1st Round	did not enter
1982	2	ASL	5th	1st Round	did not enter
1983	2	ASL	On hiatus		
1984	N/A	USL	3rd, Northern	did not qualify	did not enter

== Coaches ==
- Don Lalka (1981–1982)
- Joe Horvath (1984)

=== Staff ===
- Joe Sirianni, Trainer/Traveling Secretary
