= Roman Urbanczuk =

Polish-American soccer player

Personal information
- Date of birth: February 16, 1959 (age 67)
- Place of birth: Poland
- Position: Forward

Senior career*
Years	Team	Apps	(Gls)
1978–1979	Cleveland Force (indoor)	2	(0)
1979–1983	Pennsylvania Stoners		
1980–1981	→ Philadelphia Fever (indoor) (loan)	2	(0)
- * Club domestic league appearances and goals

Roman Urbanczuk is a retired Polish-American soccer forward who played professionally in the American Soccer League and Major Indoor Soccer League.

== Early life and education ==
Urbanczuk grew up in Poland. He later relocated with his family to Allentown, Pennsylvania, where he attended Louis E. Dieruff High School and was a member of the school's soccer team. In 1977, he was named to Pennsylvania's All State High School list. He graduated in 1978.

== Career ==
In the fall of 1978, he signed with the Cleveland Force of the Major Indoor Soccer League. He spent one season with the Force. In 1979, Urbanczuk joined the expansion Pennsylvania Stoners of the American Soccer League. He would become the only player to spend all four seasons with the Stoners during its brief existence. In 1980, Urbanczuk and his teammates won the league championship. Urbanczuk also played for the Philadelphia Fever during the 1980-1981 MISL season.

Off the field, Urbanczuk owned and operated several successful Subway franchises around his hometown of Allentown.
