= Craig Reynolds (soccer) =

American soccer player (born 1953)

Personal information
- Date of birth: August 11, 1953 (age 73)
- Place of birth: Webster, New York, U.S.
- Position: Defender

College career
Years	Team	Apps	(Gls)
- Monroe Tribunes
1974	Brockport Golden Eagles		

Senior career*
Years	Team	Apps	(Gls)
1976–1980	Rochester Lancers	63	(2)
1978–1979	New York Arrows (indoor)	23	(9)
1979–1980	Detroit Lightning (indoor)	32	(5)
1980–1981	Chicago Horizon (indoor)	28	(14)
1981	Rochester Flash		
1981–1982	New Jersey Rockets (indoor)	30	(4)

Managerial career
- 1985–1987: Virginia Cavaliers (assistant)
- 1988–1996: Christopher Newport Captains
- 1996–2003: Virginia Cavaliers (assistant)
- 2004–2007: Chicago Fire (assistant)
- 2011–: DePaul Blue Demons (assistant)
- * Club domestic league appearances and goals

Craig Reynolds (born August 11, 1953) is an American retired soccer defender who played professionally in the North American Soccer League and Major Indoor Soccer League. Most recently Reynolds served as an associate Head Coach with the DePaul University men's soccer from 2011 to 2018. He also served as an assistant coach with the Chicago Fire from 2004 to 2007. He had three children - Lauren (1988) Taylor (1992) and Aidan (1994).

== Player ==
Reynolds began his collegiate career at Monroe Community College. He then transferred SUNY Brockport where he played on the 1975 NCAA Men's Division III Soccer Championship team. He graduated in 1975 with a bachelor's degree in physical education. In 1976, Reynolds signed with the Rochester Lancers of the North American Soccer League. He played for the Lancers in the 1976 NASL indoor tournament for which Lancers' coach Dragan Popovic converted Reynolds from a midfielder to a defender.

He played with the Lancers through the 1980 season when the team folded. During his years with the Lancers, Reynolds also played indoor soccer during the winter season. In 1978, he became a member of the New York Arrows of the Major Indoor Soccer League. The Arrows drew most of its players from the Lancers and were the first champions of M.I.S.L. beating the Philadelphia Fever in the Final in April, 1979. He then moved to the Detroit Lightning for the 1979-1980 MISL season, the Chicago Horizon for the 1980-1981 MISL season and the New Jersey Rockets for the 1981-1982 MISL season. In 1981, he also played for the Rochester Flash in the American Soccer League.

== Coach ==
In 1985, Reynolds became an assistant coach with the Virginia Cavaliers. In 1988, he moved to Christopher Newport University where he was head coach of the men's soccer and tennis teams. During eight seasons, he compiled a 69-66-13 record. On January 26, 1996, Reynolds became an assistant coach with the Virginia Cavaliers. In September 2002, he was named the AFLAC Assistant Soccer Coach of the Year. In 2004, he was hired as an assistant coach by the Chicago Fire of Major League Soccer. On April 5, 2011, DePaul University hired Reynolds as an assistant coach with the men's soccer team.
