= Matt Kennedy =

American soccer player (born 1958)

Personal information
- Date of birth: April 7, 1958 (age 68)
- Place of birth: Levittown, Pennsylvania, U.S.
- Height: 5 ft 9 in (1.75 m)
- Position: Goalkeeper

Senior career*
Years	Team	Apps	(Gls)
1979	Philadelphia Fury	0	(0)
1979–1981	Philadelphia Fever (indoor)	14	(0)
1983	Carolina Lightnin'	21	(0)
1984–1987	Minnesota Strikers (indoor)	20	(0)
1987–1988	Wichita Wings (indoor)	22	(0)
- * Club domestic league appearances and goals

Matt Kennedy is an American retired soccer goalkeeper who played in the North American Soccer League, American Soccer League and Major Indoor Soccer League.

In 1979, Kennedy signed with the Philadelphia Fury of the North American Soccer League, but saw no game time before being released. He then played for the Philadelphia Fever of the Major Indoor Soccer League from 1979 to 1981. In 1983, he played for the Carolina Lightnin' in the American Soccer League. He was the league's second leading goalkeeper. In 1984, he signed with the Minnesota Strikers of the MISL but suffered what first appeared to be a career-ending knee injury during the pre-seasons He played only two games over the next two years, but became a regular starter during the 1986–1987 season. On July 15, 1987, Kennedy signed as a free agent with the Wichita Wings.

Kennedy is currently a coach with Vision Soccer Academy in Waukee, Iowa. He is also the head coach of Hoover High School. Before moving to Iowa to help start Iowa United Soccer Club, he was a founding member of the Bangu Soccer Club of Minneapolis.
