= George Gorleku =

Ghanaian footballer

Personal information
- Date of birth: September 26, 1955 (age 71)
- Place of birth: Ghana
- Position: Defender

Youth career
- 1975–1978: Eastern Illinois Panthers

Senior career*
Years	Team	Apps	(Gls)
1980	Pennsylvania Stoners		
1981	Chicago Horizon (indoor)	18	(0)
1981	Buffalo Stallions (indoor)	4	(0)
- * Club domestic league appearances and goals

George Gorleku is a retired soccer defender from Ghana. He played professionally in the American Soccer League and Major Indoor Soccer League.

Gorleku attended Eastern Illinois University where he played on the men's soccer team from 1975 to 1978. He earned All American honors each of his four seasons, first team in 1976 and 1978, second team in 1975 and honorable mention (third team) in 1977. He was inducted into the school's Athletic Hall of Fame in 2005.

The Seattle Sounders drafted Gorleku in 1980, but did not sign him. He instead began his professional career with the Pennsylvania Stoners of the American Soccer League. He was the 1980 ASL MVP. That year the Stoners defeated the Sacramento Spirits, 2–1, for the league championship. Gorleku and Rich Reice scored for the Stoners. He then played for the Chicago Horizon and Buffalo Stallions in the Major Indoor Soccer League.

== Yearly Awards ==
- 1980 - ASL MVP
