= Dave Lischner =

American soccer player

Personal information
- Full name: David Lischner
- Date of birth: December 18, 1962 (age 63)
- Place of birth: Philadelphia, Pennsylvania, U.S.
- Position: Forward

Senior career*
Years	Team	Apps	(Gls)
1981–1982	Philadelphia Fever (indoor)	28	(4)
1982–1983	Buffalo Stallions (indoor)	42	(13)
1983–1984	New York Arrows (indoor)	25	(5)

International career
- United States U20
- * Club domestic league appearances and goals

David Lischner (born December 18, 1962) is an American retired soccer player who played professionally in the Major Indoor Soccer League, and was a member of the U.S. team at the 1981 FIFA World Youth Championship, who is now a board certified psychiatrist with the Evidence Based Treatment Centers of Seattle (EBTCS).

Lischner grew up in Cherry Hill, New Jersey and graduated from Cherry Hill High School West where he was a 1980 third team high school All American soccer player. He played one game for the U.S. at the 1981 FIFA World Youth Championship. In the fall of 1981, he signed with the Philadelphia Fever of the Major Indoor Soccer League. In 1982, he moved to the Buffalo Stallions and in 1983, he signed with the New York Arrows. In 1983, he was also a member of the U.S. soccer team at the 1983 Pan American Games. In 1998, he was inducted into the South Jersey Soccer Hall of Fame.

Lischner is currently on the staff of Dialectical Behavior Therapy Center of Seattle and is on the faculty of the University of Washington. Additionally, he is the CEO and co-founder of Valant Medical Solutions, an EMR and Practice Management Suite for behavioral health care practitioners.
