= Curtis Leeper =

American soccer player

Personal information
- Date of birth: December 28, 1955 (age 70)
- Place of birth: Lebanon, Pennsylvania, U.S.
- Positions: Forward; defender

Youth career
- FIU Golden Panthers

Senior career*
Years	Team	Apps	(Gls)
1977–1979	Fort Lauderdale Strikers	16	(0)
1979–1980	Philadelphia Fury	18	(0)
1979–1980	Pittsburgh Spirit (indoor)	30	(4)
1981–1983	Carolina Lightnin'		
1981–1982	Phoenix Inferno (indoor)	29	(1)
1982–1983	Los Angeles Lazers (indoor)	14	(1)
1984	Fort Lauderdale Sun		
- * Club domestic league appearances and goals

Curtis Leeper (born December 28, 1955) is an American retired soccer player who played professionally in the North American Soccer League, Major Indoor Soccer League and American Soccer League.

Leeper attended Florida International University, playing on the men's soccer team. In 1977, he turned professional with the Fort Lauderdale Strikers of the North American Soccer League. He spent two seasons with the Strikers before being traded to the Philadelphia Fury during the 1979 season. In the fall of 1979, he began his indoor career with the Pittsburgh Spirit of the Major Indoor Soccer League. He would go on to play a single season with the Spirit as well as the Phoenix Inferno and Los Angeles Lazers. From 1981 to 1983, Leeper played for the Carolina Lightnin' of the American Soccer League. After his retirement, he worked for Nike for 21 years having many different job responsibilities. One of which was director of Sales for the US soccer division, where he was awarded US sales manager of the year.
