= Detroit Rockers =

American NPSL indoor soccer team, 1990–2001

The Detroit Rockers were an indoor soccer team in the National Professional Soccer League from 1990 to 2001. They played in Joe Louis Arena and Cobo Arena in downtown Detroit, Michigan, as well as The Palace of Auburn Hills and Compuware Sports Arena in the suburbs. For a time, they were led by star player-coach Andy Chapman until he was lured away by the more deep-pocketed Detroit Neon in 1994. The big stars of the Rockers included Drago Dumbovic and goalie Bryan "Goose" Finnerty. The Rockers won the 1991–1992 NPSL Championship. The Rockers outlasted the home-town rival Neon only because the Neon folded with their league the CISL.The Rockers themselves finally folded in 2001 when the NPSL ceased operations. Until the Rockers folded, they were owned by businessmen from Walled Lake.

== Year-by-year ==
Year	League	Reg. season	Playoffs	Owner(s)	Avg. attendance
1990–91	NPSL	3rd, American	Semifinals	N/A	4,031
1991–92	NPSL	3rd, American	Champions	N/A	3,416
1992–93	NPSL	6th, American	Did not qualify	Michael & Marian llitch	3,369
1993–94	NPSL	2nd, National	2nd Round	Michael & Marian llitch	5,201
1994–95	NPSL	4th, National	1st Round	Michael & Marian llitch	4,331
1995–96	NPSL	5th, National	Did not qualify	Michael & Marian llitch	4,526
1996–97	NPSL	3rd, National North	Did not qualify	N/A	5,101
1997–98	NPSL	4th, National North	Did not qualify	N/A	5,408
1998–99	NPSL	3rd, National North	Did not qualify	N/A	5,458
1999–00	NPSL	3rd, National North	Did not qualify	N/A	4,098
2000–01	NPSL	5th, National	Did not qualify	N/A	2,990

== Ownership & Staff ==
- (United States) David Woodrow – Co-Owner / General Manager
- (United States) Gary Miller – Co-Owner / General Manager

== Coaches ==
- Brian Tinnion 1990–1994
- Pato Margetic 1994–1999
- Drago 1999–2000
- Brian Tinnion 2000–2001

== Honors ==
MVP

- Andy Chapman: 1991
- Dan O'Keefe: 1992

Leading scorer

- Andy Chapman: 1991
- Dan O'Keefe: 1992

Defender of the Year

- Sean Bowers: 1994, 1995

Rookie of the Year

- Goose Finnerty: 1991
- Sean Bowers: 1992
- Jason Willen: 1996
- Travis Roy: 1998

Coach of the Year

- Brian Tinnion: 1991

First Team All Star

- 1991: Andy Chapman
- 1992: Dan O'Keefe
- 1993: Sean Bowers
- 1994: Sean Bowers, Andy Chapman
- 1995: Sean Bowers
- 1997: Dennis Brose

== Media coverage ==
In Detroit, the Rockers could be seen on Barden Cablevision and Pro-Am Sports System with Ian Parratt, Brian Tinnion, and Detroit Free Press columnist Bill Roose among the commentators.
