= Mike Mancini =

English-American footballer (born 1955)

Personal information
- Full name: Michael Leonard Mancini
- Date of birth: 8 June 1955 (age 71)
- Place of birth: Hammersmith, England
- Positions: Forward; midfielder

Senior career*
Years	Team	Apps	(Gls)
1978–1979	New York Apollo		
1980–1981	San Francisco Fog (indoor)	38	(21)
1981	Detroit Express	26	(16)
1983–1984	Hendon	16	(3)
1984	Orient	2	(0)
- * Club domestic league appearances and goals

Michael Leonard Mancini (born 8 June 1955) is an English-American former professional soccer player who played as a forward in the American Soccer League and Major Indoor Soccer League.

Mancini played for the New York Apollo in 1978 and 1979. In 1978, he scored 17 goals in 23 games. He then played for the San Francisco Fog during the 1980-1981 Major Indoor Soccer League season. He then played for the Detroit Express in 1981.

== Honours ==
Individual

- ASL top Scorer: 1978 (17 Goals) - Jointly held with Jose Neto & Jimmy Rolland
