= Willie Ehrlich =

Hungarian soccer coach (1928–2021)

William Ehrlich (April 23, 1928 – December 26, 2021) was a Hungarian-born American soccer coach.

== Biography ==
Ehrlich was born in Budapest, Hungary on April 23, 1928. He grew up there until the Hungarian Revolution in 1956 when he and his wife, Agnes, fled to Austria. In 1950, they arrived in Camp Kilmer, New Jersey, USA, where they were treated as refugees. Ehrlich moved to Bethlehem, Pennsylvania, where he remains living at the age of 82. Ehrlich is best known for his survival of the Auschwitz death camp and as a leader of the Hungarian Revolution. He is also known as president and owner of The Bicycle Corporation of America, and head coach, owner and founder of the Pennsylvania Stoners soccer team. Ehrlich died on December 26, 2021, at the age of 93.
