= Mike Laschev =

Soviet-American footballer

Personal information
- Birth name: Mykhailo Laschev
- Date of birth: August 20, 1953 (age 73)
- Place of birth: Lviv, Ukrainian SSR, Soviet Union (now Ukraine)
- Position: Forward

Senior career*
Years	Team	Apps	(Gls)
1981	Rochester Flash	20	(13)
1980–1983	Buffalo Stallions (indoor)	105	(92)
1984–1985	Chicago Sting (indoor)	41	(28)
1985–1986	Baltimore Blast (indoor)	24	(9)
- * Club domestic league appearances and goals

Mike Laschev (Note: Ukrainian: Майк Лащев, romanized: Maik Lashchev) (born Mykhailo Laschev, (Note: Ukrainian: Михайло Лащев, romanized: Mykhailo Lashchev) August 20, 1953) is a retired soccer forward who played professionally in the American Soccer League and Major Indoor Soccer League. Laschev was born in Lviv, Ukrainian SSR, Soviet Union (now Ukraine).

In 1981, he played for the Rochester Flash of the American Soccer League. In the fall of 1980, Laschev signed with the Buffalo Stallions of Major Indoor Soccer League. In 1982, he became a U.S. citizen. He spent three seasons with the Stallions before moving to the Chicago Sting in 1984. In the fall of 1985, the Sting sold Laschev's contract to the Baltimore Blast. He spent one season in Baltimore, then left the league.
