= Niels Guldbjerg =

Danish footballer (born 1958)

Personal information
- Full name: Niels Guldbjerg
- Date of birth: 10 February 1958 (age 68)
- Place of birth: Aalestrup, Denmark
- Position: Midfielder

Senior career*
Years	Team	Apps	(Gls)
1979–1980	Detroit Express	9	(1)
1979–1980	Detroit Express (indoor)	7	(2)
1980–1981	Philadelphia Fever (indoor)	37	(6)
1981–1982	New Jersey Rockets (indoor)	39	(20)
1982–1984	Buffalo Stallions (indoor)	62	(18)
1982	Detroit Besa		
1982	Toronto Italia		
1983	Hamilton Steelers		
Total		154	(47)

Managerial career
- 1984: Niagara Purple Eagles
- * Club domestic league appearances and goals

Niels Guldbjerg (born 10 February 1958) is a Danish retired professional footballer who played in the North American Soccer League and the Major Indoor Soccer League for the Detroit Express, Philadelphia Fever, New Jersey Rockets and Buffalo Stallions.

In his native country Guldbjerg played for Aalborg (1976–1977), Frederikshavn (1978) and Herfølge BK (1979) before moving to the US. In the summer of 1982, he played in the National Soccer League originally with Detroit Besa, and later with Toronto Italia. In 1983, he played in the Canadian Professional Soccer League with Hamilton Steelers.

He also served as Head Coach of the NCAA Division 1 Niagara University Purple Eagles during the 1984 season posting a 4–8 record.
