= Charlie Greene (soccer) =

American soccer player

Charley Greene
Personal information
- Full name: Charles Robert Greene
- Date of birth: October 7, 1959 (age 67)
- Place of birth: New York, New York, U.S.
- Positions: Forward; defender

Senior career*
Years	Team	Apps	(Gls)
1980	Miami Americans		
1980–1981	California Surf (indoor)	15	(4)
1981	California Surf	16	(3)
1981–1982	New Jersey Rockets (indoor)	40	(17)
1982	Georgia Generals		(3)
1982–1984	Cleveland Force (indoor)	46	(15)
1984–1986	Pittsburgh Spirit (indoor)	57	(13)
1986–1988	Kansas City Comets (indoor)	93	(21)
1988–1989	Hershey Impact (indoor)		
1989–1990	Cleveland Crunch (indoor)	48	(3)
- * Club domestic league appearances and goals

Charlie Greene is an American retired soccer player who played professionally in the North American Soccer League, American Soccer League, Major Indoor Soccer League and American Indoor Soccer Association.

== Professional ==
In 1980, Greene played for the Miami Americans of the American Soccer League. He moved up to the California Surf of the first division North American Soccer League in late 1980. He played the 1980–81 indoor season and the 1981 outdoor season with the Surf. In the fall of 1981, Greene moved indoors with the New Jersey Rockets of the Major Indoor Soccer League. He spent one season with the Rockets, then moved back outdoors in 1982 with the Georgia Generals of the ASL. He returned to the indoor game that fall with the Cleveland Force. He played the 1988–1989 season with the Hershey Impact of the American Indoor Soccer Association. That year he was a first team All AISA selection. On July 14, 1989, the Cleveland Crunch signed Greene to a one-year contract.

== Yearly Awards ==
- 1988-89 AISA All-Star Team
