= Soloman Hilton =

American soccer player

Solomon Hilton
Personal information
- Position: Forward

Senior career*
Years	Team	Apps	(Gls)
1979	New Jersey Americans		
1980	Miami Americans	23	(7)
1981	New York United	?	(14)
1982–1983	Pennsylvania Stoners		
1984	Houston Dynamos		
1984–1986	Columbus Capitals (indoor)		
1986–1987	Tampa Bay Rowdies (indoor)		
- * Club domestic league appearances and goals

Solomon "Solly" Hilton is a retired soccer forward who played professionally in the American Soccer League and American Indoor Soccer Association.

== Career ==
Although a native of West Africa, Hilton attended high school in the United States. In 1979, he signed with the New Jersey Americans of the American Soccer League in 1979. In 1981, he played for New York United. In 1982, he moved to the Pennsylvania Stoners. Hilton was a member of the 1984 Houston Dynamos of the United Soccer League. Later in 1984, he joined the Columbus Capitals of the American Indoor Soccer Association. In 1986, he moved to the Tampa Bay Rowdies for their one season in the AISA.
