= Tony Suarez =

Cuban-American soccer player

Personal information
- Full name: Antonio Jose Suarez
- Date of birth: February 2, 1956
- Place of birth: Havana, Cuba
- Date of death: April 18, 2007 (aged 51)
- Place of death: Charlotte, North Carolina, United States
- Position: Forward

College career
Years	Team	Apps	(Gls)
1977–1978	Appalachian State Mountaineers		
1979–1980	Belmont Abbey Crusaders		

Senior career*
Years	Team	Apps	(Gls)
1980	The Press Box		
1981	Carolina Lightnin'	22	(15)
1981–1983	Cleveland Force (indoor)	9	(4)
1983	Carolina Lightnin'	7	(4)
1984	Charlotte Gold		
- * Club domestic league appearances and goals

Antonio Jose "Tony" Suarez (February 2, 1956 – April 18, 2007) was a Cuban-American soccer forward. He played professionally in the American Soccer League and Major Indoor Soccer League and was the 1981 American Soccer League Rookie of the Year.

== Youth ==
Suarez was born in Havana, Cuba. In 1972 his parents, Roberto and Miriam Suarez, left Cuba and relocated their family in Charlotte, North Carolina, where Suarez attended Myers Park High School. He graduated from Myers Park in 1974, enrolled in Appalachian State University, then transferred to Belmont Abbey College, where he received a B.A. in Business Management.

== Professional ==
Suarez had an unsuccessful initial tryout for the Carolina Lightnin' of the American Soccer League. He was put in the lineup for the team's second game; however, after a series of injuries decimated the roster. He was an immediate hit with the crowd who embraced him as "a hometown kid." Suarez became known for his "toothy grin and shoulder-length hair," according to Charlotte Observer sports reporter David Scott. Suarez scored nine goals in his first 12 games and ended his first season with 15 goals. Suarez' style, according to Scott, was to "knock the ball past defenders, run it down, then put it in the back of the net. Or he would chase down a pass behind the defense, slip the ball into the goal and race off to celebrate." He was named the 1981 American Soccer League Rookie of the Year. On August 11, 1981, he signed a two-year joint contract with the Lightnin' and the Cleveland Force of the Major Indoor Soccer League worth just over $100,000. The contract stipulated that Suarez would play two outdoor seasons for the Lightnin' and two indoor winter seasons on loan to the Force. Suarez began the 1981-1982 MISL season in good form, scoring four goals in eight games only to injure his left knee in late 1981. He sat out the 1982 outdoor season, then rejoined the Lightnin' for that team's final season in 1983. While playing with the Charlotte Gold of the United Soccer League in 1984, Suarez injured his right knee, ending his professional career.

== Later life and death ==
Suarez regained the public spotlight in 1991 when he received a 22-month prison sentence for conspiracy to possess cocaine with intent to distribute. On April 18, 2007, Suarez committed suicide via carbon monoxide poisoning.

== Yearly awards ==
- ASL Rookie of the Year - 1981
- ASL All-Star Team - 1981
