= Brian Tinnion (footballer, born 1948) =

English footballer and manager

Personal information
- Date of birth: 11 June 1948 (age 78)
- Place of birth: Workington, England
- Positions: Forward; midfielder

Senior career*
Years	Team	Apps	(Gls)
1965–1968	Workington	98	(24)
1968–1976	Wrexham	279	(54)
1971–1972	→ Chester (loan)	3	(0)
1976	New York Cosmos	20	(8)
1977	Team Hawaii	26	(7)
1978	Colorado Caribous	24	(4)
1978–1984	Detroit Express	24	(2)
1979–1981	Detroit Express (indoor)	19	(14)
1980–1981	Wichita Wings (indoor)	21	(7)

Managerial career
- 1982–1984: Detroit Express
- 1990–1994: Detroit Rockers
- 1994–1999: Eastern Michigan Eagles
- 2000–2001: Detroit Rockers
- * Club domestic league appearances and goals

Brian Tinnion (born 11 June 1948) is an English retired Association football forward who played eleven seasons in the lower English divisions, four in the North American Soccer League, three in the American Soccer League and one in the Major Indoor Soccer League. He also coached professionally in the American Soccer League and National Professional Soccer League as well as at the collegiate level with Eastern Michigan University. He was the 1982 ASL league leading scorer and most valuable player (MVP).

== Player ==
Tinnion began his career in 1965 with Workington A.F.C. which then played in the Third Division. However, the team dropped to the Fourth Division in 1967. In 1968, he transferred to fellow fourth division club Wrexham A.F.C. During the 1971–1972 season, he played three games on loan to Chester F.C., but otherwise was a regular first team player with Wrexham during his eight seasons in Wales. In 1976, he left Wrexham for the United States where he signed for the New York Cosmos, playing alongside Pele. He played one season in New York before being selected by Team Hawaii in the expansion draft. Hawaii lasted only one season before folding and the Colorado Caribous picked him up in the dispersal draft. He played twenty-four games with Colorado, scoring four goals in 1978 before being traded to the Detroit Express. The Express left the NASL following the 1980 season and moved to the second division American Soccer League. In 1982, the Express won the league title as Tinnion led the league in scoring and was named the league MVP. That season, Tinnion coached the team as well as played midfielder. However, he was not listed as head coach as the league prohibited player-coaches. The league changed the rules in 1983 and Tinnion was named the official head coach for 1983 and 1984. Tinnion also spent 1980–1981 Major Indoor Soccer League with the Wichita Wings.

== Coach ==
After retiring from playing, Tinnion remained in Detroit where he continued to coach. In 1990, he was hired by the Detroit Rockers which played in the National Professional Soccer League. He was named the 1990–1991 Coach of the Year. The next season, he led the team to the league title. In December 1994, he resigned from the Rockers to become the head coach at Eastern Michigan University until the university dropped men's soccer in 1999. In December 2001, Tinnion returned as the head coach of the Rockers, but the team folded at the end of the season. His son, Paul Tinnion, was head coach of the Eastern Michigan University women's soccer team and is now Director of Coaching of the Michigan Jaguars soccer club based in Novi, Michigan. His other son, Joseph Tinnion is the current men's coach of Rochester University.

== Current ==
Tinnion now lives in the suburbs of Detroit with his wife Mary and his two sons, Joey and Kyle. He previously coached for the Michigan Revolution, Workington and the Grosse Pointe Mustangs.
