= Nashville Diamonds =

- Founded: 1982
- Dissolved: 1982
- Stadium: Hale Stadium; Nashville, Tennessee
- Capacity: 16,000
- Owner: Ralph Woerheide
- Head Coach: Hector Guevara
- League: American Soccer League

The Nashville Diamonds were an American soccer club based in Nashville, Tennessee, that was a member of the American Soccer League. Their home stadium was Hale Stadium on the campus of Tennessee State University, then the home of the Tennessee State Tigers football team.

== Owner ==
- (United States) Ralph Woerheide

== 1982 Roster ==
- (United States) Fred Armstrong 12 Apps 0 Goals
- (United States) Rich Finneyfrock
- (Nigeria) Godwin Iwelumo
- (United States) Brian McInerney 13 Apps 0 Goals
- (United States) Franklin Lawson
- (Syria) Issac Moushi
- Armando Pelaez
- Tony Rowshanaei
- (United States) Bret Simon
- (United States) Kurt Swanbeck
- (United States) Kirk Gilbert 8 Games 3 Goals

== Year-by-year ==
Year	Division	League	Reg. season	Playoffs	U.S. Open Cup
1982	2	ASL	7th	Did not qualify	Did not enter
