= Hugh O'Neill (soccer) =

American soccer player

Personal information
- Date of birth: July 16, 1954 (age 72)
- Place of birth: Kearny, New Jersey, U.S.
- Height: 5 ft 10 in (1.78 m)
- Positions: Forward; midfielder

Youth career
- Scots American FC
- University of Bridgeport

Senior career*
Years	Team	Apps	(Gls)
1976	Hartford Bicentennials	16	(2)
1976–1977	Rangers (loan)	15	(2)
1977	Connecticut Bicentennials	3	(1)
1977	Dallas Tornado	2	(0)
1978-1979	Memphis Rogues	12	(2)
1979	New Jersey Americans	16	(4)
1980	Cleveland Force (indoor)	15	(1)
1981-1982	Carolina Lightnin'	40	(8)
- * Club domestic league appearances and goals

Hugh O'Neill (born July 16, 1954) is an American retired soccer player who played professionally in the North American Soccer League, Scottish First Division, American Soccer League and Major Indoor Soccer League.

== Early life ==
Born and raised in Kearny, New Jersey, O'Neill graduated from Essex Catholic High School before playing soccer at the Scots Club and the University of Bridgeport, where he was a 1973 and 1975 All-American soccer player.

== Playing career ==
=== Club ===
In 1975, O'Neill turned professional with the Hartford Bicentennials of the North American Soccer League.

The following fall, the Bicentennials sent him on loan to Glasgow Rangers F.C. of the Scottish League. The Bicentennials failed to perceive that O'Neill's Roman Catholic faith and his family history of supporting Celtic could present a problem. Despite this, O'Neill played every reserve game that season, except those against the Celtic reserves. The Bicentennials became the Connecticut Bicentennials for the 1977 season. The Bicentennials sent him to the Dallas Tornado during the season.

In 1978, he became the first player signed by the Memphis Rogues. He later played for the Carolina Lightnin' of the American Soccer League. In September 1981, he scored the game-winning goal as the Lightnin' took the ASL championship. He continued with the Lightnin' in 1982, but lost part of the season when he returned to New Jersey to be with his dying father. He played the 1980 indoor season with the Cleveland Force of the Major Indoor Soccer League.

=== International ===
O'Neill played for the 1976 U.S. Olympic Soccer team during its qualification campaign for the Olympic tournament.
