= Billy Boljevic =

Yugoslavian footballer (1952–2023)

Personal information
- Full name: Rajko Boljevic
- Date of birth: 24 August 1952
- Place of birth: Crvenka, PR Serbia, FPR Yugoslavia
- Date of death: 4 May 2023 (aged 70)
- Place of death: Podgorica, Montenegro
- Height: 6 ft 0 in (1.83 m)
- Position: Forward

Senior career*
Years	Team	Apps	(Gls)
1981	New York Eagles	26	(25)
1981–1982	New Jersey Rockets (indoor)	21	(10)
1982–1983	Detroit Express		(22)
1984	Dallas Americans		
- * Club domestic league appearances and goals

Rajko "Billy" Boljevic (24 August 1952 – 4 May 2023) was a Yugoslavian professional footballer who played as a forward. He was the 1981 American Soccer League Most Valuable Player and league leading scorer.

== Career ==
In 1981, Boljevic signed with the New York Eagles of the American Soccer League. He led the league in both goals and points was he was named the league MVP. In November 1981, he signed with the New Jersey Rockets of the Major Indoor Soccer League. He then played for the Detroit Express for the 1982 and 1983 seasons. In 1984, he was with the Dallas Americans in the United Soccer League.

== Death ==
Boljevic died on 4 May 2023, in Montenegro.

== Honours ==
- ASL MVP: 1981
- ASL Leading Goalscorer: 1981 (25 Goals)
- ASL Leading Points Scorer: 1981 (59 Points)
