= Franco Paonessa =

Italian-American athlete

Personal information
- Date of birth: October 24, 1959 (age 67)
- Place of birth: Italy
- Position: Midfielder

College career
Years	Team	Apps	(Gls)
- Fulton–Montgomery Raiders

Senior career*
Years	Team	Apps	(Gls)
1982	Rochester Flash		
1984	New York Nationals		
1987–1988	Albany Capitals		
1989	New Jersey Eagles		
1988–1989	Memphis Storm (indoor)		
1990–1991	New York Kick (indoor)		
1992	Greek American AA		
1992–1993	Canton Invaders (indoor)	8	(1)
1996	New Jersey Stallions		

International career
1992	Puerto Rico		
- * Club domestic league appearances and goals

Franco Paonessa is a retired Italian-American professional soccer player who has played in the second and third American Soccer Leagues, United Soccer League, American Indoor Soccer Association and USISL.

Paonessa was a junior college All American soccer player at Fulton–Montgomery Community College. In 1982, he signed with the Rochester Flash of the second American Soccer League where he earned Rookie of the Year honors. In 1984, he played for the New York Nationals of the United Soccer League. In 1987, Paonessa joined the Albany Capitals as they played an independent schedule. In 1988, the Capitals joined the third American Soccer League. In 1989, the Capitals did not offer Paonessa a contract and he moved to the New Jersey Eagles. He also played for the Memphis Storm of the American Indoor Soccer League In December 1990, the New York Kick of the National Professional Soccer League signed Paonessa who had been painting houses. He remained with the Kick through the 1990-1991 season. He then played for the Greek American AA of the Cosmopolitan Soccer League. In the fall of 1992, he signed with the Canton Invaders of the NPSL. He then played for the New Jersey Stallions of the USISL. Paonessa has continued to play amateur soccer with U.S. Parma.

== International ==
Paonessa competed for the Puerto Rico national football team during Puerto Rico's qualification games for the 1994 FIFA World Cup.

== Yearly Awards ==
- 1982 ASL Rookie of the Year
