= Steve Westbrook =

American soccer player and coach

Personal information
- Date of birth: December 12, 1958 (age 67)
- Place of birth: St. Louis, Missouri, United States
- Positions: Forward; defender

Youth career
- 1977–1980: Indiana Hoosiers

Senior career*
Years	Team	Apps	(Gls)
1981–1983	Detroit Express		
1981–1983	Wichita Wings (indoor)	44	(1)
1984–1985	Dallas Americans		

Managerial career
- 2009–2010: Cal Lutheran University (assistant)
- * Club domestic league appearances and goals

Steve Westrook is a retired American soccer defender who played professionally in the American Soccer League, United Soccer League and Major Indoor Soccer League.

In 1977, Westbrook graduated from Christian Brothers College High School. He attended Indiana University, playing as a forward on the men's soccer team from 1977 to 1980. The Hoosiers finished runner-up in the 1978 and 1980 NCAA Division I Men's Soccer Championship.

In 1981, Westbrook signed with the Detroit Express of the American Soccer League and was moved to defensive midfielder. He was a 1981 First Team All Star. Westbrook spent three seasons with the Express which folded following the 1983 season. In the fall of 1981, Westbrook joined the Wichita Wings of the Major Indoor Soccer League. He spent two years with the Wings playing the winter indoor seasons. In 1984, he moved to the Dallas Americans of the United Soccer League for the two seasons of the league's existence.
