= Andy Chapman =

Footballer (born 1959)

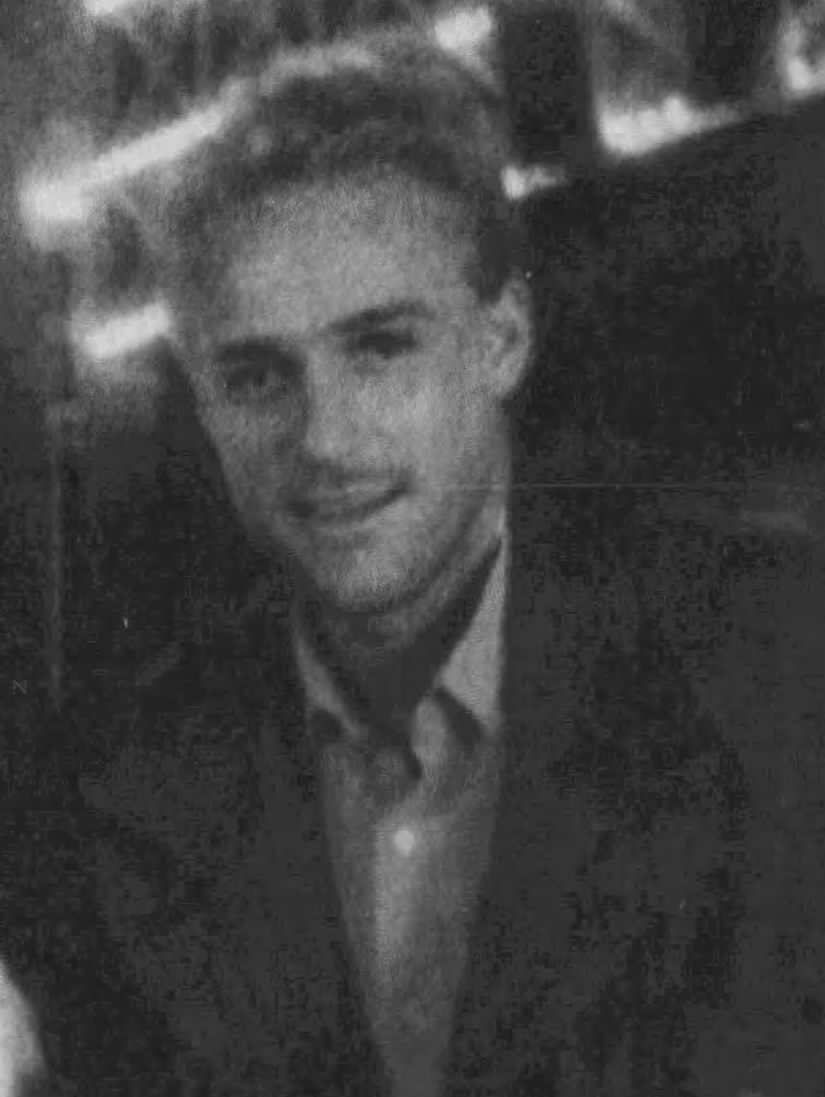
- Chapman in 1986

Personal information
- Date of birth: 18 September 1959 (age 67)
- Place of birth: London, England
- Position: Forward

Senior career*
Years	Team	Apps	(Gls)
1975–1978	Arsenal		
1978–1980	California Sunshine	48	(24)
1979–1985	Wichita Wings (indoor)	207	(187)
1980–1981	→ Cleveland Cobras (loan)	44	(32)
1982–1983	Detroit Express	?	(31)
1985–1986	Cleveland Force (indoor)	59	(34)
1986–1988	Baltimore Blast (indoor)	49	(28)
1988–1990	Wichita Wings (indoor)	76	(34)
1990–1994	Detroit Rockers (indoor)	145	(278)
1995–1996	Detroit Neon (indoor)	56	(69)
2000	Detroit Rockers (indoor)	3	(1)

Managerial career
- 1990–1994: Detroit Rockers
- 1994: Detroit Neon
- * Club domestic league appearances and goals

Andrew Chapman (born 18 September 1959) is an English-American retired soccer player who saw his greatest success as an indoor player in the United States. He spent six seasons in the American Soccer League, ten in the Major Indoor Soccer League, four in the National Professional Soccer League and two in the Continental Indoor Soccer League.

== Career ==
Chapman was born in London, England, on 18 September 1959. An Arsenal signee at age 16, he turned pro the following year. Chapman went to the United States in the summer of 1978 to play outdoors for the California Sunshine of the American Soccer League for two seasons. In 1980, he moved to the Cleveland Cobras, spending two seasons with them. In 1982, he moved to the Detroit Express. The Express won the Championship in 1982 as Chapman led the league with 23 goals. His last outdoor season came in 1983 with the Express. The league collapsed at the end of the season and Chapman dedicated himself to indoor soccer. He had already established himself as an indoor player, signing in 1979 with the Wichita Wings of the Major Indoor Soccer League (MISL). In 1984, he was a first team All Star as a forward. He began the 1984–1985 season in Wichita, but on 1 March 1985, the Cleveland Force purchased Chapman's contract. He finished the season in Cleveland, then played the 1985–1986 season with the Force before being released on 10 May 1986 as part a salary reduction effort. He then moved to the Baltimore Blast before moving to the Wings for the 1986–1988 seasons. Chapman, known as one of the best natural goal-scorers to ever play the indoor game, was a fan favourite in every city. He finished with 307 MISL goals, a tally which ranks 8th all time. His best season was 1983–84 when he finished second in goal scoring, seventh in league overall scoring and was named to the league's All-MISL team.

In 1990, Chapman became a player-coach of the National Professional Soccer League's Detroit Rockers. He led the league in scoring during the 1990–1991 season with 77 goals and 37 assists in 40 games. He was selected as both the NPSL MVP and a first team All Star that season. In 1992, the Rockers won the NPSL championship. In 1994, the Detroit Neon of the Continental Indoor Soccer League hired Chapman away from the Rockers. In 2000, he came out of retirement to play for the Detroit Rockers in their last three games of the season, making him one of only two players (Goalkeeper, Victor Nogueira) to play in four different decades.

Involved in youth coaching since 1978, Chapman started the Birmingham United Football Club in 1997, a youth soccer club in Birmingham, Michigan.
