= Rich Reice =

American soccer player

Personal information
- Date of birth: June 18, 1956 (age 70)
- Place of birth: Levittown, Pennsylvania, U.S.
- Position: Forward

College career
Years	Team	Apps	(Gls)
–1977	Penn State Nittany Lions		

Senior career*
Years	Team	Apps	(Gls)
1978–1979	Philadelphia Fury	29	(2)
1980–1983	Pennsylvania Stoners		
1983–1984	Wichita Wings (indoor)	17	(4)
1983	Carolina Lightnin'		
1984	Charlotte Gold		
1984	New York Nationals		
- * Club domestic league appearances and goals

Rich Reice is an American retired professional soccer forward who played in the North American Soccer League, Major Indoor Soccer League, American Soccer League and United Soccer League.

Reice attended Penn State University where he was a 1977 First Team All American soccer player. In 1978, the Philadelphia Fury selected Reice in the first round of the North American Soccer League draft. In 1980, he played for the Pennsylvania Stoners of the American Soccer League. The Stoners went to the ASL championship where they defeated the Sacramento Spirits 2–1 on goals by Reice and George Gorleku. In 1983, he joined the Wichita Wings of Major Indoor Soccer League. He also played for the Charlotte Gold. In 1984, he played for the of the United Soccer League.

Reice then coached the Neshaminy High School boys' team, winning the 1995 Trenton, New Jersey high school coach of the year honors.
