= Scott Manning (soccer) =

American soccer player

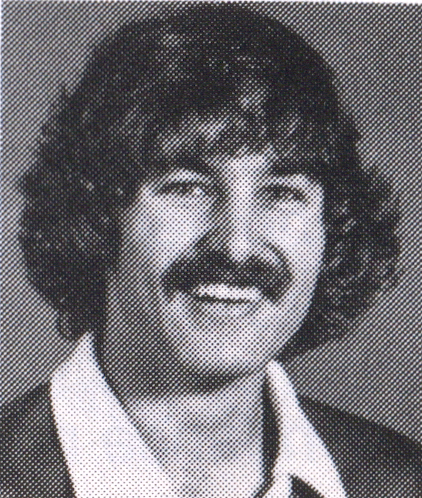
- Manning circa 1984

Personal information
- Date of birth: September 5, 1957 (age 69)
- Place of birth: Rochester, New York, U.S.
- Height: 6 ft 0 in (1.83 m)
- Position: Goalkeeper

Youth career
- 1975: Monroe Community College
- 1976–1978: SUNY Cortland

Senior career*
Years	Team	Apps	(Gls)
1979–1980	Pennsylvania Stoners		
1979–1981	Buffalo Stallions (indoor)	54	(0)
1981–1982	Carolina Lightnin'	53	(0)
1982–1983	Phoenix Inferno (indoor)	24	(0)
1983–1991	Baltimore Blast (indoor)	193	(?)
1992	Wichita Wings (indoor)	6	(0)
1992	Dallas Sidekicks (indoor)	0	(0)

Managerial career
- 1986–1991: Loyola College (assistant)
- * Club domestic league appearances and goals

Scott Manning (born September 5, 1957) is an American retired soccer goalkeeper. He spent four seasons in the American Soccer League where he was the 1980 league leading goalkeeper. He also played thirteen seasons in the Major Indoor Soccer League where he was the 1985 MISL Goalkeeper of the Year.

== Player ==
=== Youth ===
Manning grew up in Rochester, New York where he played basketball and baseball at R.L. Thomas High School. He began playing soccer as a senior. He played goalkeeper his freshmen year of college at Monroe Community College. In 1976, he transferred to SUNY Cortland. In 1977, Cortland finished runner up in the NCAA Men's Division III Soccer Championship to Lock Haven University of Pennsylvania. He was a 1978 SUNY-East Honorable Mention goalkeeper.

In 1980, Manning was selected for the U.S. Olympic soccer team which qualified for the finals in Moscow. However, the team did not compete after President Jimmy Carter elected to boycott the games in response to the Soviet invasion of Afghanistan.

=== Professional ===
In 1979, Manning signed with the Pennsylvania Stoners of the American Soccer League and spent two seasons with the team. He was the 1980 league leading goalkeeper with a 1.01 goals against average. In the fall of 1979, he signed with the Buffalo Stallions of the Major Indoor Soccer League. In 1981, he joined the Carolina Lightnin' of the ASL. After the 1982 ASL season, he moved indoors permanently, signing with the Phoenix Inferno.

He later played for the Baltimore Blast. He was voted 1984 Championship Series MVP as Baltimore defeated the St. Louis Steamers in the championship series 4 games to 1. The following year Manning was league Goalkeeper of the Year and ALL-MISL team selection in leading the year in Goals Against Average with a 3.89 GAA. Manning played the fourth most games of any MISL goalie, 353. In the fall of 1991, Manning expected to sign a new contract with the Blast, but the team declined to make him an offer. He then became a free agent. In February 1992, he played six games with the Wichita Wings after starter Kris Peat was injured. In April 1992, Manning came out of retirement to play four play-off games for the Dallas Sidekicks after Joe Papaleo tore his anterior cruciate ligament.

== Coaching ==
In 1986, Manning became an assistant with Loyola College, a position he held until 1991. He began coaching at Loyola while working on his master's degree in business administration there. He later coached at Fallston High School and Overlea High School. On July 6, 2004, Dulaney High School hired Manning to coach the boys' soccer team.

== Yearly Awards ==
- ASL Leading Goalkeeper 1980
- MISL Championship Series Player of the Year 1984
- MISL Goalkeeper of the Year 1985
- MISL All-Star Team 1985, 1989
- Eastern Division Championship (Regular Season) 1983–84, 1984–85, 1988–89*, 1989–90
- Eastern Division Championship (Playoffs)1984, 1985, 1989, 1990
- MISL Championship 1984
