= Detroit Safari =

Detroit Neon / Safari
Team history	1994-1997
Arena	The Palace of Auburn Hills 1994-1997
Based in	Auburn Hills, Michigan
Colors
Leagues	Continental Indoor Soccer League

The Detroit Safari (founded as the Detroit Neon) was a member of the Continental Indoor Soccer League that played at The Palace of Auburn Hills. Their owners, Palace Sports & Entertainment, were awarded a franchise on November 4, 1993.

== Club history ==
The Detroit Neon got their name from the Dodge Neon automobile, via a sponsorship from the Chrysler Corporation. (The International Hockey League's Detroit Vipers were also owned by Palace Sports and named for a Chrysler product.) In 1997, the naming rights were sold to General Motors and they became the Detroit Safari, after the GMC Safari minivan.

The club did well at the box office (they led the CISL in attendance in their first season in 1994 and drew well above league average in all four years they played), but not on the turf. Despite having experienced indoor player Andy Chapman (who also served as Detroit's coach—unofficially, as the league prohibited player-coaches), the club finished next-to-last in the Eastern Division in both 1994 and 1995 and out of the playoffs. The Neon improved to 13-15 in 1996 and snuck into the post-season, only to be beaten two games to one by the Monterrey La Raza in the first round (the sole playoff contest at the Palace drew 4,477 fans.) Finally, the re-named Safari finished with a 3-25 mark in 1997, tying the 1994 Carolina Vipers for the worst in league history. The team folded along with the rest of the CISL after the 1997 season.

During the team's existence, some games (including all 1997 home contests) were televised on PASS Sports.

=== Year-by-year ===
Year	Record	Regular season	Playoffs	Avg. attendance
1994	11–17	5th Eastern	Did not qualify	9,379
1995	5–23	5th Eastern	Did not qualify	7,833
1996	13–15	5th Eastern	First round	7,032
1997	3–25	6th Eastern	Did not qualify	6,917
Overall	32–80	–	–	7,790

== Ownership ==
- Palace Sports & Entertainment Group

== Staff ==
- (United States) Ron Campbell – General Manager (1994–97)

== Head coaches ==
- (United States) Chris Keenan (1994)
- (United States) David B. Baker (1994)
- (England) Paul Child (1995–97)
- (England) Ian Fairbrother (1997)
