= Detroit Express (1981–1983) =

- Full name: Detroit Express
- Nickname: The Express
- Founded: 1980
- Dissolved: 1983
- Ground: Pontiac Silverdome
- Capacity: 80,000
- Chairman: Sonny Van Arnem
- Head Coach: Brian Tinnion
- League: American Soccer League
Home colors	Away colors

The Detroit Express was an American soccer team based in Detroit, Michigan and a member of the American Soccer League. They joined the league in 1981 after the original NASL Express were moved to Washington D.C. to replace the Diplomats who had folded at the end of 1980. The ASL Express played their home games in the Pontiac Silverdome and then at Tartar Field on the campus of Wayne State University.

The 1981 Express finished second in the Freedom Division with a 15 win, 11 loss and 2 tie record. Mike Mancini was the leading scorer for Detroit with 16 goals, followed by Brian Tinnion with 9. The Express advanced to the second round of the playoffs with a 4–1 defeat of the New York Eagles, but were knocked out of the semi-finals 1–1 and 1–2 by New York United.

The 1982 ASL consisted of 7 teams in one division. With 19 wins, 4 ties, and 5 losses, The Express had the best record in the league. They then won the championship, defeating the Georgia Generals in the semi-finals and the Oklahoma City Slickers in the finals. Detroit players Brian Tinnion, Andy Chapman, and Billy Boljevic were 1, 2 and 4 overall in league scoring. And goal keeper Tad DeLorm had the best goals against average in the league.

By 1983 the league had shrunk down to 6 teams, but returned to the 2 division format. The Express struggled to a 12–13 record (the league instituted a shootout rule for the season) to finish 2nd in the Western Division behind the Dallas Americans, and did not make the playoffs. Billy Boljevic and Andy Chapman led the team in scoring with 9 goals each.

In the early months of 1984, the ASL, which had been in a period of decline for several years, finally collapsed as most of its last few active teams elected to either fold or join a new league being formed by the owners of the Jacksonville Tea Men and Dallas Americans, the United Soccer League. Express owner Sonny Van Arnem took steps towards joining this new league, but he ultimately decided against it due to the league not being sanctioned by the USSF. Unable to find another home in an indoor league, the club closed up shop shortly afterwards.

== Yearly awards ==
ASL All-Star Team

- 1981 – Steve Westbrook
- 1982 – Chris Tyson

ASL Leading Goal Scorer

- 1982 – Brian Tinnion (22 Goals)

ASL Leading Points Scorer

- 1982 – Brian Tinnion (59 Points)

ASL MVP

- 1982 – Brian Tinnion

ASL Leading Goalkeeper

- 1982 – Tad DeLorm

== Year-by-year ==
Year	Division	League	W	L	T	Pts	Reg. season	Playoffs	U.S. Open Cup
1981	2	ASL	15	11	2	125	2nd, Freedom	Semifinals (lost to New York United)	Did not enter
1982	2	ASL	19	5	4	144	1st	Champion	Did not enter
1983	2	ASL	12	13	—	98	2nd, Western	Did not qualify	Did not enter
