= Carolina Lightnin' =

Soccer club in North Carolina, US

CarolinaLightnin (Logo)

The Carolina Lightnin' was a professional American soccer club based in Charlotte, North Carolina that was a member of the American Soccer League from 1981 to 83. After the Lightnin' folded, much of the front office staff and some of the players joined a new club called the Charlotte Gold that played in the United Soccer League in 1984. Both the Lightnin' and the Gold played home matches at American Legion Memorial Stadium.

== History ==
In 1978, a group of soccer enthusiasts in Charlotte, North Carolina formed a group called Charlotte Soccer '79 to promote the professional game in the region. Charlotte Soccer '79 hosted the first professional game ever played in the Carolinas when the North American Soccer League's Minnesota Kicks and Atlanta Chiefs met in an exhibition game at American Legion Stadium on March 24, 1979. Following the game, NASL commissioner Phil Woosnam indicated that the best path to getting an NASL team in Charlotte would be through relocation rather than expansion. Meanwhile, the de facto second division American Soccer League was eager to establish clubs in the American southern states and was ready to act quickly while asking for significantly less in expansion fees. So when an investment group headed by local businessman Bob Benson called Carolina Professional Soccer decided to pursue a franchise, they chose to apply for membership in the ASL. Their proposal was approved in December 1979, and they planned to join the league for its 1981 season.

Unlike many of the expansion teams of the period in both the ASL and NASL, Benson's group gave themselves a long time to assemble a strong front office, line up sponsors, publicize the existence of their new club, and encourage the growth of soccer in the region before opening the gates for their first match. In 1980 the group put on several youth camps and clinics, and they hosted two exhibition matches in the stadium that the new team would call home (one between two ASL teams and the other matching the ASL all-stars against an Israeli first division club). The team also made connections with several prominent local businesses and local print and television media, who were generous with their coverage. In September, the team announced that its first head coach would be Rodney Marsh, an English Premier League veteran who had played for the NASL's Tampa Bay Rowdies from 1976-1979. Marsh had a big personality and was fairly well known, enjoying enough popularity that he starred in a Miller Lite commercial in 1980. The team nickname, Lightnin', was picked from among thousands of entries in a "name the team" contest posted in the Charlotte Observer newspaper and was announced shortly after Marsh's hire.

== The Lightnin' Years (1981-83) ==
The Carolina Lightnin' were one of four expansion teams joining the ASL for its 1981 season. Though the league had a history dating back to 1933, it was in the midst of an unstable period as it entered the 1980s. In the 1970s the league had tried to take advantage of rising interest in the sport to expand from its traditional base in the northeast into the midwest and the west coast, but member clubs were not able to keep up with the travel costs of a coast-to-coast league. It was in a constant state of flux, with most clubs lasting only a few seasons before folding. After the 1980 season, five teams, including the last three west coast teams, ended operations. So even with four new clubs coming in for 1981, the league once again featured a total of just eight teams (one team was coming back after sitting out in 1980 but not folding). The Lightnin' managed to take advantage of the changing landscape by scooping up the league's leading scorer in 1980, Mal Roche, and all-star Don Tobin when the teams they had been playing for shut down. They also outbid the Pennsylvania Stoners for the league's best goalie, Scott Manning. Rodney Marsh was assembling a strong and experienced roster; however, one of the most impactful members of the 1981 team had never played professional soccer before and was, in fact, turned away when the team held open tryouts.

Tony Suarez had played his high school soccer in Charlotte before playing a few years of college soccer at two different schools. But by 1981 he was 25 and was back in Charlotte playing at the amateur level. Marsh did not select Tony from the pool of players at the open tryout, but Suarez offered to help in any way he could and persuaded the coach to let him train with the team as a practice squad member while also accepting a job as the team's bus driver. Suarez's persistence paid off when injuries to several Carolina players gave him the chance to suit up for their second game. He immediately made good on the opportunity, scoring nine goals in the first twelve games in which he played. The speedy young forward was a hit with fans, who loved that he was a local. Suarez would end the season with fifteen goals scored in just twenty-two games, he was one of two Lightnin' players named to the ASL All-Star team (along with Don Tobin), he was named MVP of the All-Star Game, and he also took home Rookie of the Year honors.

Watching Tony Suarez outrun opposing defenders would turn out to be only one of several things Carolina fans would love about coming to Lightnin' games. The publicity and community connections laid down in the sixteen months between the team's founding and its first kickoff were paying off at the box office. The team's philosophy was that they were in the family entertainment business first. The majority of American soccer fans, they reasoned, did not know much about the nuances of the game yet; but, if they had a great time, they would become repeat customers who would eventually learn more about the on-field product. As part of creating an overall entertainment experience, they put on an array of flashy promotional events and giveaways. The team ran contests to let fans try to win cars, hosted a "burn your mortgage" night, put on a post-game Beach Boys concert and even gave fans a chance to win a small airplane. The season's average attendance of 6,123 set a league record.

The Lightnin' were also quite successful on the field in their debut season. They finished with a regular season record of 16–3–9, which was best in their conference and second best in the league. In the playoffs, they defeated the Rochester Flash and then the Pennsylvania Stoners to earn a place in the championship game against New York United on September 18. New York's record was better than Carolina's, which should have earned them the right to host the game. But the United had been bouncing around between a couple of different stadiums (including a misguided attempt to elevate to "big league" status by playing at Shea Stadium in 1980), and they were drawing very poorly. The league voted to host the championship game in Carolina provided that the Lightnin' would share the gate receipts with New York.

The Carolina front office only had two weeks for promotion between the vote and the game itself, but they still set an ambitious goal of drawing 10,000 fans. On match night, the organization was shocked when 20,163 fans showed up, filling nearly every seat of American Legion Memorial Stadium. United struck first, scoring in the 64th minute, but Don Tobin tied the game just five minutes later. When regulation ended with the teams still tied, the game went into overtime. In the second overtime period, Lightnin' forward Hugh O'Neill scored to end the sudden death overtime and give Carolina the win. Elated fans swarmed the field to celebrate Charlotte's first professional sports championship.

In 1982, the team brought back coach Marsh and nearly every member of the '81 squad. They also signed two accomplished veterans from the shrinking NASL: Derek Smethurst (who had played with Marsh at Tampa Bay) and Paul Child. Expectations were high heading into the defense of the 1981 title, but the '82 Lightnin' were not able to build the kind of momentum they had enjoyed the previous year. Smethurst and Child were both past their primes, and Smethurst only played in a handful of games. The team was also forced to play without the services of Tony Suarez. His breakout rookie season had attracted the attention of the Cleveland Force of the Major Indoor Soccer League, and he signed on to play year-round—indoors with the Force in the winter and outdoors the Lightnin' in the summer. But after a promising start in the MISL (scoring four goals in eight games), he suffered a devastating knee injury that forced him to miss the rest of the indoor season and all of Carolina's 1982 campaign. The team finished with a record of 11–4–13. In the playoffs they ran into an Oklahoma City Slickers squad that was playing a role similar to what the Lightnin' had played in 1981—the expansion team that had found potent chemistry and immediate success. The Slickers won the semifinals series two games to none.

In 1983, the Lightnin' were still struggling to find their form on the field and at the box office. Tony Suarez was back, but his surgically repaired knee kept him from reaching the speeds that had allowed him to be so effective in 1981, and he only netted seven goals. The team finished fourth in the league with a record of 12-13 (the league had done away with ties). Carolina did attract some attention by hiring Bobby Moore, captain of the World Cup winning English team in 1966, to assist Rodney Marsh on the coaching staff. The 42 year-old Moore even suited up for eight games when the team was left short-handed by injuries, allowing younger players on both the Lightnin' and their opponents the bragging rights of saying that they played with/against the English legend. However, even the presence of the all-time great could not rescue the Lightnin'. They pushed the top seeded Jacksonville Tea Men to a deciding mini game in the two-leg semifinals, but Jacksonville prevailed to move on to the finals. In October, Rodney Marsh accepted the invitation of a new ownership group to return to Tampa Bay as the Rowdies' head coach.

The decline of the club since the heady days of its first season was palpable, but they were not alone in their struggles to keep the professional game alive at this time. The ASL only had six member clubs in 1983, one of whom (Oklahoma City) needed an emergency cash bailout to complete the season. The instability and perpetual near-bankruptcy that had marked the league for years came to a breaking point at the annual meetings that took place in January 1984. A dispute over expansion rights in Fort Lauderdale drove the owners of the Tea Men and the Dallas Americans to become fed up with fighting inactive owners, who by league rules retained full voting and territory rights and significantly outnumbered active owners at this point, and they started to lay the groundwork for a new second division soccer league that they hoped would be more stable and financially sound. By the end of January, the Detroit Express announced their intent to also join this new league, which was to be called the United Soccer League. The defections of Detroit, Jacksonville and Dallas left Carolina as the only active ASL team. Though there were discussions of putting on a 1984 ASL season with a few proposed expansion franchises and the Rochester team returning from a year off, principal Carolina owner Bob Benson decided to fold the Lightnin' franchise in February. The last few potential ASL teams either joined the USL or never came into existence, and it quietly went out of business.

Charlotte's soccer fans did not have to wait long for the next iteration of professional soccer in the Queen City, though. On April 1, an ownership group headed by Felix Sabates was awarded a franchise in the United Soccer League. The new franchise only had about six weeks to get its operation up and running before the first game of the season, and they were able to pull this off, in part, by hiring most of the Lightnin's front office staff. The organization would choose the name Charlotte Gold.

== The Charlotte Gold (1984) ==
Charlotte Gold (Logo)

At a glance, the United Soccer League appeared to be a continuation of the ASL, with three teams transferring directly to the new league (Jacksonville Tea Men, Dallas Americans and Rochester Flash) and two other franchises that had new names/colors but were essentially reboots of ASL clubs that had just closed down (the Gold and the Oklahoma City Stampede). However, this league was founded to be more financially sound than its predecessor, and it operated with a couple of key differences heading into their debut season. There was a league-wide salary cap and an imbalanced schedule heavy on regional matchups to control costs. Initial league plans also called for teams to field a mostly American roster and play an indoor season in the winter so that they would be better connected to their communities year-round.

The Gold were in the league's Southern division along with the Jacksonville Tea Men and the Fort Lauderdale Sun (the team whose contested franchise rights had been the catalyst for the formation of the USL). NASL, MISL and U.S. National Team veteran David D'Errico led the club as a player-coach, and the roster featured five former Lightnin' players, including Pat Fidelia and Tony Suarez. While the season featured some uplifting moments, such as when the PA system would play "Let's Hear It for the Boy" from the recently released movie Footloose whenever Suarez would score a goal, the Gold did not succeed in creating the atmosphere that the Lightnin' had enjoyed. The mood was further dampened when Suarez suffered an injury to his other knee and was forced into an early retirement. Attendance for the Gold was not on par with the Lightnin' years, and the team only managed an 11–13 record and missed the playoffs.

Following the USL's first season, the owners were facing the reality that the league's financial austerity measures had not been sufficient to prevent significant financial losses. The winter indoor season that had been announced at the league's founding never materialized, and most of the teams failed to post performance bonds in advance of a 1985 outdoor season. Gold ownership hoped to extricate the team from the floundering USL and move up to the first division NASL. These hopes evaporated quickly, though, when the NASL, which had been in decline for several years, hit rock bottom in the winter of 1985. Only two of the nine teams that had taken the field in 1984 declared that they were willing and able to return for another outdoor season, and following the failure of a last-ditch set of USL/NASL merger negotiations, the NASL cancelled the 1985 season on March 28. With their big league dreams dashed, Gold leadership elected to pull the plug on the franchise. Four teams would try to stage a 1985 USL season, but they were only able to operate for six weeks before the teams and league were bankrupt and forced to close down, leaving the U.S. temporarily without any outdoor professional league for the first time since 1933. Charlotte would have to wait almost a decade for professional soccer to return in the form of the Charlotte Eagles of the USISL, who began play in 1993.

Lightnin' and Gold rosters 1981-1984

== Honors ==
ASL Champions

- 1981

ASL Rookie of the Year

- 1981 Tony Suarez

ASL First Team All Star

- 1981 Don Tobin, Tony Suarez

== Year-by-year ==
Year	Division	League	Reg. season	Playoffs	U.S. Open Cup
1981	2	ASL	1st, Freedom	Champion	did not enter
1982	2	ASL	4th	Semifinals	did not enter
1983	2	ASL	3rd, Eastern	Semifinals	did not enter
1984	N/A	USL	2nd, Southern	did not qualify	did not enter

== Coaches ==
- (England) Rodney Marsh 1980–1983
- (United States) Dave D'Errico 1984

== Notable players ==
- (England) Bobby Moore (1983)
- (United States) (England) Paul Child (1982)
- (United States) (Haiti) Pat Fidelia (1982–1984)
- (United States) Matt Kennedy (1983)
- (United States) Stuart Lee (1983) 25 Apps 11 Goals
- (United States) Scott Manning (1981–1982)
- (England) Dave Philpotts (1978–83)
- (United States) (Republic of Ireland) Dave Pierce (1981–1983) 60 Apps Winning assist ASL Final 1981
- (United States) Mal Roche (1981) 22 Apps 8 Goals
- (South Africa) Derek Smethurst (1982) 6 Apps
- (Republic of Ireland) Don Tobin (1981)
- (Cuba) (United States) Tony Suarez (1981–1983) 22 Apps 15 Goals
- (United States) (England) Dave Power (1981–1983) Captain
- (United States) Hugh O'Neill (1981–1982) Winning goal ASL Final 1981
- (United States) Santiago Formoso (1981, 1983)
