= Pennsylvania Stoners =

Former association football team

Pennsylvania Stoners was a name used by two different American soccer clubs, both based in the Lehigh Valley. The first club competed in the American Soccer League, which was unofficially the second division of professional outdoor soccer at the time, from 1979 to 1983. The Stoners name was revived for a team that competed in the National Premier Soccer League, a national amateur league at the fourth tier of the American soccer pyramid, in 2008 and 2009.

== American Soccer League (1979-83) ==
The original Stoners came into existence thanks to the efforts of businessman Willie Ehrlich, who had come through the youth system of Ujpest FC in his native Hungary and played professionally in France before immigrating to the United States and settling in northeastern Pennsylvania. After years of coaching some of the top amateur players in the Lehigh Valley area, he began to consider forming a professional club as he saw the growing interest in the North American Soccer League during the middle years of the 1970s. In 1976, his Shimano junior amateur team twice defeated West German club Arminia Bielefeld's touring youth team, a group considered among the best in the world at that level. Ehrlich suspected that in a few years, when they were finishing their college careers, some of the Shimano players could prove to be capable professionals, and at a time when most professional teams in the U.S. were heavily stocked with foreign talent, his vision was to create a club with as many locally based American players as possible to encourage connection between the team and Lehigh Valley residents. In 1978, Ehrlich led a team he called the Lehigh Valley All-Stars to a 4-3-1 record in a set of exhibition matches against a few American Soccer League clubs, Mexican side Guadalajara, and some other regional amateur all-star teams, including two wins and a tie against ASL teams. This solidified his belief that he could build a competitive team around this core of local talent, and in the same year he announced that he was forming the Stoners to begin play in the ASL in 1979. The new team's moniker was derived from Pennsylvania's nickname, "The Keystone State," and they planned to play home games at the Allentown School District's football stadium.

In their first active season, Willie Ehrlich served as the organization's president, head coach, and talent scout. The team got off to a promising start, setting a league record for attendance at a home opener when 7,487 fans turned out for their Allentown debut. They also held their own on the field, finishing in third place in the Eastern Division with a record of 13-5-10. In the playoffs, they defeated the New York Eagles in the first round before being eliminated by the division leaders, the Columbus Magic, in the semifinals. Christian Nwokocha led the team in scoring with 13 goals in 21 games and was named a second team all-star, and Ehrlich earned coach of the year honors. In an interesting footnote, two men who played in at least part of the 1979 season with the Stoners would go on to play in the National Football League as place kickers. Midfielder Florian Kempf began his pro football career a few years later, in 1981, but defender Matt Bahr left the team that July to attend his first NFL training camp with plans to return to the Stoners if football did not work out (a back up option that would prove quite unnecessary as Bahr earned a roster spot and proceeded to play the next 17 years in the NFL).

In 1980, the Stoners returned most of the roster from the previous season, allowing the team chemistry to keep improving. Willie Ehrlich remained the team's leader, both in the front office and on the field, despite continuing to also hold a full time job as the vice president of a local bicycle manufacturer. The team was sporting a new look this year as they became one of the first professional soccer teams in the country to display a sponsor's logo on the front of their jerseys. Major pet food manufacturer ALPO was headquartered in Allentown (ALPO being short for "Allen Products"), and they began a partnership with the club that would endure for the rest of the team's existence. On the field, several pieces came together for the second year club. Goalkeeper Scott Manning posted the league's best goals against average, three Stoners would finish in the top ten for league scoring, and newcomer George Gorleku made such an impression that he was voted the league's most valuable player. A record of 19-4-5 earned them the top seed for the playoffs and the right to host the championship match after they dispatched New York United 1-1, 3-1 in the two-leg semifinals. A robust crowd of 7,723 turned out to see their squad secure the ASL championship with a 2-1 victory over the Sacramento Gold. Ehrlich was once again named coach of the year.

But even as the team and its supporters celebrated that championship, there were several warning signs that the organization was not set up for long-term viability. Though they occasionally drew crowds of 6,000-7,000 fans, attendance was more often in the 2,000-3,000 range, and, despite the support of ALPO and several other sponsors, the Stoners had lost close to half a million dollars in the first two years of operation. Willie Ehrlich was already declaring that both increased ticket sales and more substantial corporate support would be critical to the team's survival moving forward. These off-the-field struggles were mirrored all over the country at this time in both the ASL and its first division "big brother," the NASL. Both leagues had attempted to harness the momentum of a burgeoning interest in soccer and a surge in youth participation in the game during the mid to late 1970s by expanding rapidly. However, at both levels a similar pattern emerged in which existing owners were quick to approve new members because the expansion fees were desperately needed, and they did not sufficiently vet the applicants to see if their organizations and communities were set up for long term success. Multiple teams were folding or relocating at the end of every NASL and ASL season. The expansion bubble burst particularly hard in 1980 in the ASL, which had become a coast-to-coast operation just a few years earlier. Five of its eight teams ceased operations after the season, including the last three west coast clubs.

When the Stoners returned in 1981 to begin their title defense, they found themselves traveling to an almost entirely different set of towns for road games as four expansion teams had joined the ASL to replace the five that had folded. There was also an important new face beside Willie Ehrlich on the bench. Fellow Hungarian émigré Kalman Csapo had left his position as the men's soccer coach at Rutgers University to serve as Ehrlich's assistant, and upon arriving in Allentown, he met a roster that featured many key players returning from 1980's dominant run. But signs of trouble began to appear early in the season. Ehrlich had started up his own bicycle company, and his time and attention were increasingly drawn to that venture. Average attendance at the first three home games was approximately 2,000 fans--well short of the 5,000 per match that the club estimated it would need to break even financially. Facing a rising sea of red ink, the general manager resigned and some front office positions were eliminated to reduce costs. So though Csapo had been advised by friends that the Stoners were a stable organization and a good next landing spot, he quickly found himself being asked to take on several vital off-the-field duties, including that of acting general manager, just to help the team survive. Fortunately for the Stoners, Csapo had been asked to take on some similar non-coaching responsibilities such as advertisement sales, events organization and dealing with the professional sports teams that rented university facilities when he was at Rutgers, and he accepted his expanded role with the Stoners with grace and determination. Joining him in his efforts to rescue the struggling club was a volunteer committee of three local soccer lovers with experience in business and accounting who came together to advise the club on how to repair its finances. Painful cost-cutting measures were put in place, including slashing player salaries by as much as half. Twice a day practices were reduced to just once a day as most players needed to work part-time jobs to cover the reduced income, but the team still managed to finish with the second best record in the league despite a late season swoon. In the two-leg playoff semifinals, the expansion Carolina Lightnin' raced out to a big advantage by winning the first game at home 3-1. The resilient Stoners managed two late goals to win the second leg in Allentown 2-0 and force overtime to decide the aggregate score, but the Lightnin' scored with four minutes left in the overtime to make the aggregate score 4-3, earning them a berth in the championship game.

In the ensuing offseason, the club announced a pair of significant changes. Willie Ehrlich stepped aside as head coach and majority owner in order to focus on his growing bicycle business. Kalman Csapo assumed head coaching duties and officially became the general manager, and Dave Devey, who had been one of the three volunteer financial advisors to the team the previous year, became its majority owner and president. The team also announced that they would be playing home games in nearby Bethlehem in 1982, believing that there was a larger amateur and youth soccer presence in that town that would boost attendance. Even with a new head coach, president and home field in place, the team's investors did not officially decide to field a team in 1982 until one month before the first game. Seeing that the team's founder/guiding light was gone and that there was a great deal of uncertainty swirling around the club, a number of players from Ehrlich's original core group did not return, and the 11th hour decision to field a team for 1982 also cost the club the chance to sign any of the skilled players who found themselves squeezed out of the rapidly shrinking NASL that year. What remained were a plucky group of largely unheralded American players who got off to a surprising 6-0-1 start in a set of games mostly played at home. But attendance in Bethlehem would turn out to be worse than it had been in Allentown, and debts piled up quickly. The players and coaches were forced to play without pay for a period, Devey put his shares up for sale, and the team's equipment was seized by the sheriff as bankruptcy seemed imminent. The Stoners desperately needed a financial savior, and one appeared midseason in the unlikely form of a local dentist. Dr. William Burfeind was a former college soccer player and current Stoners season ticket holder, and when he learned of the dire conditions the team was facing, he put together a group of investors that began negotiations to buy the team. Though there was now hope for the team's future and players were receiving paychecks again, the damage done by playing without pay or job security triggered a collapse on the field, and the squad went just 2-13-4 over its remaining games to end the season in sixth place in the seven-team league. The playoff format that year called for the sixth-place team to face the third-place team in a one-game play-in round, but incoming owner Burfeind opted to forfeit that game against the Georgia Generals in order to save what the club would have spent on travel and lodging to instead cover player salaries and paying down debts.

By early 1983, the financial backing of the new owners had helped the franchise become reasonably stable for the time being, but the "market correction" that had undone virtually all of the professional soccer expansion of the late 1970s left two very weakened leagues in its wake. The NASL had contracted from a peak of twenty-four teams just three years earlier to twelve teams, and even with an expansion team in Dallas and a new owner choosing to move the Jacksonville Tea Men down to the lower division, the ASL only had a six team lineup. In a sign of just how poor conditions in the ASL had become, Dr. Burfeind was voted president of the league despite having just completed the purchase of the team, and he found himself tasked with rescuing a franchise and a league all while still spending about 35 hours a week completing check ups and filling cavities. He managed to negotiate a contract with an airline that allowed ASL teams to be able to afford to fly to some away games rather than facing long bus/van trips, and he also insisted that teams put up a $50,000 performance bond that would prove crucial later in the year for preventing a struggling franchise from folding mid-season. But his Stoners only saw four players returning from the previous season (including Roman Urbanczuk and captain Jeff Tipping--the only players left from the original 1979 roster), and even with paychecks coming in on time and in full, head coach/GM Kalman Csapo would need most of the season to develop chemistry and find on field success. The Stoners were a mediocre 8-12 (the league had done away with ties) before rallying to win four of their final five games. A standings points system that rewarded regulation goals scored in addition to wins helped them finish just ahead of the other two 12-13 teams to earn a playoff berth, and in the first round of the playoffs, they eliminated the Dallas Americans 1-0 in a mini-game after each team won the home leg of the two-leg semifinals. This meant a return to the championship finals against the Tea Men, who had finished with a league-best 18-7 record. Pennsylvania's longshot run at a championship kicked off with a spark of hope: a 3-0 home win in the opener of the best-of-three series; but, they still faced an uphill battle with the second and third games slated to take place in Florida. Jacksonville forced a rubber match with a 4-1 win in Game 2, and they held on for a narrow 1-0 win in Game 3 over the tough but overmatched Stoners.

Unbeknownst to the players, coaches, and fans at the time, the Game 1 victory in those finals would be the last time this version of the Stoners would kick a ball in the Lehigh Valley. In August, Dr. Burfeind had declared his intention to have the Stoners return in 1984 as long as the team could sell 2,000 season tickets by December, but when the ASL owners' meetings opened the following January, he announced that the Stoners would be going dormant and that he would be resigning as ASL president. Later at these same meetings, a dispute over expansion rights in Fort Lauderdale would lead the ASL's newest owners (from Jacksonville and Dallas) to decide that they were already fed up with the league's perpetual instability and rules that allowed dormant owners to retain a say in league decisions. They starting working to establish a new second tier circuit, the United Soccer League, that they hoped would give their teams a more stable and solvent environment in which to compete. The remaining ASL clubs would either also defect to the USL or fold in the coming weeks, and the ASL quietly closed down after nearly 50 years of operation. Stoners leadership, coaches and players would be heavily involved in the new USL. Dr. Burfeind and Kalman Csapo accepted jobs as the league's commissioner and vice president/director of operations, respectively, and the league offices were set up in Bethlehem. Most of the 1983 roster also found a new home on one of the USL's nine teams, with eight players following Stoners assistant Gary Hindley down to Texas when he was named head coach of the new Houston Dynamos and others joining nearby clubs in Rochester, Long Island and Buffalo. As for games in the Lehigh Valley, though, the Stoners' dormancy marked the end of the area's unstable but often thrilling first experience with professional soccer.

== Year-by-year ==
Year	Division	League	Regular season	Playoffs	Open Cup
1979	2	ASL	3rd, Eastern	Semifinals	did not enter
1980	2	ASL	1st, National	Champion	did not enter
1981	2	ASL	2nd, Liberty	Semifinals	did not enter
1982	2	ASL	6th	Forfeited 1st Round	did not enter
1983	2	ASL	2nd, Eastern	Finals	did not enter

== Notable players ==
- Roman Urbanczuk (1979-83)
- Matt Bahr (1979)
- Christian Nwokocha (1979-80)
- Jeff Tipping (1979-83)
- Ron Ost (1979-82)
- Keith Tozer (1979-80)
- Florian Kempf (1979)
- Scott Manning (1979-80)
- George Gorleku (1980)
- Rich Reice (1980-83)
- Michael Collins (1981-82)
- Bill Sautter (1981)
- Solomon Hilton (1982-83)
- Joe Horvath (1983)

=== Individual honors ===
- Coach of the Year - Willie Ehrlich (1979, 1980)
- MVP - George Gorleku (1980)
- Goalkeeper of the Year: Scott Manning (1980)
- Goalkeeper of the Year: Tom Reynolds (1981)

== National Premier Soccer League (2008-09) ==
In 2007, it was announced that a new club would be joining the National Premier Soccer League (NPSL) in 2008 that would be resurrecting the Pennsylvania Stoners name. The team originally played its home games at J. Birney Crum Stadium in Allentown. In their debut season, the team captured the NPSL league championship. In 2009, the Stoners began playing their home matches at Whitehall-Coplay School District's Zephyr Sports Complex in nearby Whitehall. The team folded after the 2009 season. In 2010, the FC Sonic Lehigh Valley brought NPSL soccer back to the Lehigh Valley.

== Year-by-year ==
Year	Division	League	Regular season	Playoffs	Open Cup
2008	4	NPSL	1st, North	Champion	did not enter
2009	4	NPSL	3rd, Keystone	did not qualify	did not enter

== Honors ==
- NPSL Champions 2008
- NPSL North Division Champions 2008

== Head coaches ==
- (United States) Todd Ervin (2008)
- (United States) David Weitzman (2009)

== Stadiums ==
- J. Birney Crum Stadium in Allentown, Pennsylvania (2008)
- Zephyr Sports Complex at Whitehall High School in Whitehall Township, Pennsylvania (2009)
