= New York Eagles =

The New York Eagles were a professional soccer franchise that played in the American Soccer League from 1978 to 1981, with a one-year hiatus in 1980. The franchise played its first season in Mount Vernon, New York, then moved to Albany, New York for the 1979 and 1981 seasons, playing at Albany's Bleecker Stadium.

The Eagles' top scorer, Rajko "Billy" Boljevic, led the ASL in scoring in both 1981. The Eagles sat out the 1980 season due to financial constraints. The franchise made the playoffs in both the 1979 and 1981 seasons, but did not advance past the first game in either playoff appearance.

== Yearly Awards ==
ASL Season MVP

- 1981 – Billy Boljevic

ASL All-Star Team Selection

- 1979 – Andjelko Tesan, Branko Sematovic
- 1981 – Billy Boljevic

ASL Leading Goal Scorer

- 1981 – Billy Boljevic (25 Goals)

ASL Leading Points Scorer

- 1981 – Billy Boljevic (59 Points)

== Year-by-year ==
Year	Division	League	Reg. season	Playoffs	U.S. Open Cup
1978	2	ASL	4th, Eastern	Did not qualify	Did not enter
1979	2	ASL	2nd, Eastern	1st Round	Did not enter
1980	2	ASL	on hiatus		
1981	2	ASL	3rd, Liberty	1st Round	Did not enter

== Coaches ==
- Mike Rybak (1981)
- Gjelosh Nikac (1979)
- George Vizvary (1978)
- Dragoslav Šekularac (1978)

== Players ==
- Guillermo Ambrosini
- Billy Boljevic
- Momcilo Bozevic
- Howie Charbonneau
- Jose Cristaldo
- Simon Curanaj
- Waldir DeSouza
- Keith Gehling
- Hranislav Hadizitonic
- Ricky Kren
- Miodrag Lacevic
- Fio Maravilha
- Abdullah Nezaj
- Leo Ramas
- Salvatore Scalica
- Branko Sematovic
- Lesh Shkreli
- Robert Steinberg
- Andjelko Tesan
- Clyde Watson
