= New York Nationals (USL) =

Former soccer team

File:New York-Nationals (Logo)

New York Nationals were a professional soccer team which played a single season in 1984 with the United Soccer League. An earlier team also called the New York Nationals played in the American Soccer League during the 1920s.

== History ==
The early 1980s were a lean and difficult time for professional outdoor soccer in the United States. The North American Soccer League was in significant decline following the boom years of the late 1970s, undone by a period of over-expansion and overspending that created an unstable environment in which teams were constantly folding or moving to new cities. By 1984, only nine teams were left in the league (down from a peak of twenty-four in 1980). The de facto second division American Soccer League had likewise doomed itself to instability and difficult economic realities when it expanded beyond the northeastern United States, where it had operated very modestly since 1933, and tried to establish footholds in the midwest and west coast in the '70s and southern states in the '80s. These expansions produced a string of short-lived franchises, and the league had contracted to only six teams in 1983.

At the ASL's annual meetings in January 1984, chronic instability and frustration over a power structure that allowed inactive owners to still influence the direction of the league led the owners of the Jacksonville Tea Men and Dallas Americans to break away and start planning a new second division organization, which they named the United Soccer League. Their vision was to have franchises operate within their means and take a more grass roots approach to building a fan base in their communities. Year-round operation (with an indoor season in the winter), a strict salary cap, a focus on American players and a mostly regional schedule to reduce travel costs were all pillars on which this new league was to be founded. Three ASL clubs would end up coming directly to the USL, while two other clubs were re-organized and renamed for USL membership. Four new teams also joined the league, one of which would be the New York Nationals. The Nationals were founded by a group of mostly Greek-American owners and executives and had connections to the defunct New York Apollo/United. They planned to host home games at Hofstra University on Long Island.

== The 1984 Season ==
The club was able to sign several players with experience in the MISL, ASL or NASL including Jim Gabarra, Franco Paonessa, Rich Reice, and Michael Collins, and they nearly secured the services of Rick Davis, the top American-born player of the day. He was willing to come lend his support to the upstart league, but the other owners voted against granting the Nationals a salary cap exemption so that they could afford to sign him. Even without Davis, the team had a strong roster and got off to a 5-0 start. Several signs suggest that the team was almost immediately unable to meet its financial obligations, though, and they collapsed both on and off of the field. Head coach Jim McGeough's resignation was announced on June 18. Top players such as Collins, Reice and Paonessa were no longer listed on roster shortly thereafter, and the Nationals started to field a smaller squad made up almost entirely of local Greek-American players. The team also changed home venues mid-season from Hofstra University to a stadium in Mt. Vernon, NY. They would go on to lose fourteen of their remaining nineteen games and did not qualify for postseason play.

== The Team Folds ==
Though the Nationals did manage to limp across the finish line of the 1984 season, both their future and the future of the USL looked bleak. Despite the league's conservative fiscal structure, all of its teams were losing money. The league's indoor winter season never materialized, and all but one of its teams failed to meet a February 1985 deadline to post a performance bond for another outdoor season. A last-ditch set of USL/NASL merger discussions meant to shore up USL team finances and keep the NASL from shrinking to non-existence was called off without an agreement on March 5. Shortly after that the Nationals officially dropped out of the league along with four other clubs. Four teams would try to stage a 1985 USL season, but the bankrupt league was forced to shut down after about eight weeks of play.

== Year-by-year ==
Year	Reg. season	Playoffs	U.S. Open Cup
1984	2nd (Northern Division)	Did not qualify	Did not enter
