= Miami Americans =

American soccer club

Miami Americans (Logo)

The Miami Americans was an American soccer club based in Miami, Florida that was a member of the American Soccer League. The team existed for only the 1980 season and played their home games at Tropical Park Stadium.

== History ==
In late 1979, Joseph Raymond sold the New Jersey Americans to a London-based company. The new ownership moved the team to Miami and released most of the players and staff. In the winter of 1979–1980, the team then hired Ron Newman on a five-year contract at $200,000 per year. On June 20, Newman resigned to become coach of the San Diego Sockers of the first division North American Soccer League. When he left the Americans, he induced Manu Sanon to move with him. Five days later, the London company sold the team to Stan Noah and Archie Oliver. The team finished the season at 10-2-15 and folded soon after.

== Coach ==
- (England) Ron Newman (1980) 9 games (2 wins- 4 losses -3 draws record)
- (England) Brian Tiler (1980) 19 games (8 wins -11 losses-0 draws)

== Year-by-year ==
Year	Division	League	Reg. season	Playoffs	U.S. Open Cup
1980	2	ASL	3rd, American	Did not qualify	Did not enter
