= Buffalo Stallions =

American indoor soccer team, 1979–1984

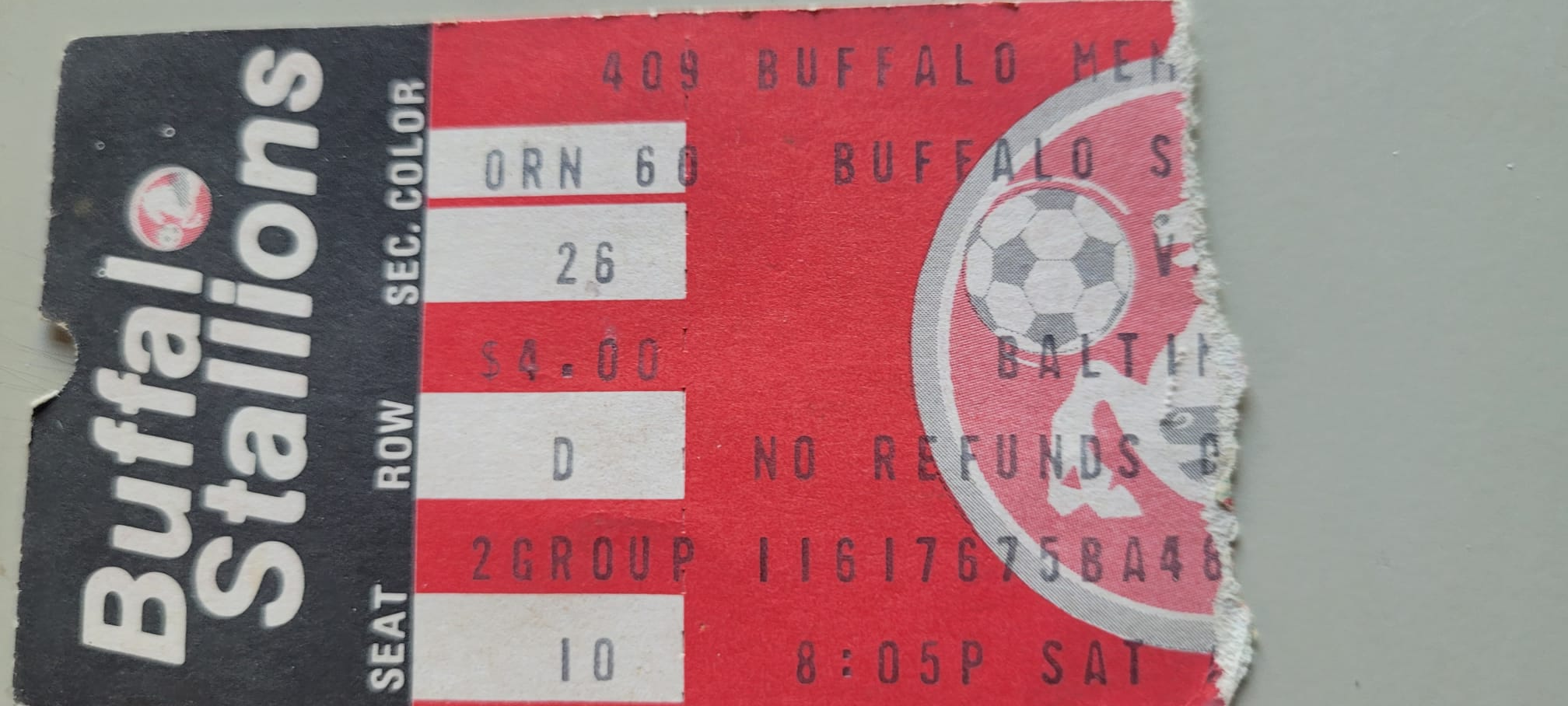
Buffalo Stallions ticket stub from a game against the Baltimore Blast, November 5, 1983

The Buffalo Stallions were a soccer team based out of Buffalo, New York, that played in the Major Indoor Soccer League from 1979 to 1984. Their home arena was Buffalo Memorial Auditorium. It was the last professional club for which the Portuguese legend and FIFA 100 forward Eusébio played, in 1979–1980.

== Notable players ==
- (Portugal) Eusébio 1979–80
- (United States) Edward Kennedy 1983–1984
- (Hungary) Lajos Kű 1980–1981
- (United States) Jim May 1980–1985
- (United States) Rudy Pikuzinski 1983–84
- (Scotland) Robert Prentice 1984
- (Romania) Chris Vranceanu 1983–84

== History ==
Year	League	Reg. season	Playoffs	Attendance average
1979–1980	MISL	17–15 (3rd Atlantic Division)	Lost 1st Round Playoff to Pittsburgh Spirit	8,556
1980–1981	MISL	20–20 (4th Central Division)	Lost 1st Round Playoff to St. Louis Steamers	9,487
1981–1982	MISL	24–20 (4th Eastern Division)	Lost 1st Round Playoff to New York Arrows	9,214
1982–1983	MISL	22–26 (6th Eastern Division)	Missed playoffs	7,442
1983–1984	MISL	15–33 (6th Eastern Division)	Missed playoffs	4,834

== Accomplishments ==
- 1979–1980 – All-MISL Team – Ian Anderson
- 1979–1980 – MISL Rookie of the Year – Jim Sinclair
- 1981–1982 – MISL Rookie of the Year – Germain Iglesias

== Media ==
The games were broadcast on radio for at least two seasons. Veteran Buffalo sportscaster Van Miller called the play by play the first season on 104.1 FM, then WACJ. Jim Lane called the shots in the second season.
