= South Carolina Gamecocks men's soccer =

Team of the University of South Carolina

South Carolina Gamecocks
- 2026 South Carolina Gamecocks men's soccer team
- Founded: 1978; 48 years ago
- University: University of South Carolina
- Head coach: Tony Annan (6th season)
- Conference: Sun Belt
- Location: Columbia, South Carolina, US
- Stadium: Stone Stadium (capacity: 5,700)
- Nickname: Gamecocks
- Colors: Garnet and black
Home	Away

NCAA tournament runner-up
- 1993

NCAA tournament College Cup
- 1988, 1993

NCAA tournament Quarterfinals
- 1985, 1988, 1989, 1993

NCAA tournament Round of 16
- 1979, 1985, 1987, 1988, 1989, 1990, 1993, 1995, 1997, 1998, 2010

NCAA tournament Round of 32
- 1985, 1986, 1987, 1989, 1990, 1992, 1993, 1994, 1995, 1997, 1998, 2000, 2001, 2010, 2015, 2016

NCAA tournament appearances
- 1979, 1985, 1986, 1987, 1988, 1989, 1990, 1992, 1993, 1994, 1995, 1997, 1998, 2000, 2001, 2002, 2004, 2005, 2010, 2011, 2015, 2016

Conference tournament championships
- C-USA: 2005, 2010

Conference regular season championships
- Metro: 1993; C-USA: 2011

The South Carolina Gamecocks men's soccer team represents the University of South Carolina and, as of the 2022 college soccer season, competes in the Sun Belt Conference. The team is coached by Tony Annan, who succeeded Mark Berson as head coach after the 2020 season. (Note: Due to COVID-19 issues, the NCAA moved the Division I men's soccer tournament from its normal fall 2020 schedule to spring 2021. The NCAA continued to designate that season as the "2020" season.) Berson had been the Gamecocks' only head coach since the program's inception in 1978 and had participated in 22 NCAA Tournaments, reaching the Quarterfinals on four occasions. Since 1981, South Carolina has played its home games at Stone Stadium, which is affectionately called "The Graveyard" by South Carolina fans due to an adjoining cemetery.

== Program history ==
South Carolina first fielded a men's soccer team in 1978 under the direction of former coach Mark Berson. The program wasted little time making a name for itself on the national stage, as it reached the NCAA Quarterfinals in 1985. The 14-year period from 1985 to 1998 was a dominant era for South Carolina, as it posted a 213–61–22 overall record with 12 NCAA Tournament appearances. Of the 12 NCAA Tournament trips during this run, the Gamecocks advanced to the second round or beyond on nine occasions.

Throughout its history, South Carolina has made 22 NCAA Tournaments, with four Quarterfinal appearances, two Semi-final appearances, and a 1993 National Runner-up finish. The 1993 squad won 16 contests before falling to Virginia 2–0 in the National Title game. The Gamecocks' most recent NCAA Tournament appearance came in 2016. Since the SEC does not sponsor NCAA Men's Soccer, South Carolina has participated as an Independent (even in its original years in the Metro Conference), finally joining the Metro for men's soccer in 1993 and 1994, but was forced back to independent status following the 1995 reunification with the Great Midwest Conference to form Conference USA (C-USA) until 2005, when Kentucky left the Mid-American Conference in order to allow the two SEC schools to play in C-USA together. South Carolina and Kentucky continued to play in C-USA through the 2021 season, after which both left to join the revived men's soccer league of the Sun Belt Conference.

In terms of conference championships, South Carolina won the Metro Conference season title in 1993 and the Conference USA tournament in 2005 and 2010, along with its regular season title in 2011.

== Head coaches ==
=== Coaches history ===
Name	Years	Seasons	Won	Lost	Tie	Pct.
Mark Berson	1978–2020	43	511	261	76	.654
Tony Annan	2021–present	5	33	40	13	.458
Total		48	544	301	89	.644

== Year-by-year results ==
Season	Coach	Record		Notes
Season	Coach	Overall	Conference	Notes
Independent
1978	Mark Berson	13–3–1	—	
1979	Mark Berson	14–5–0	—	NCAA First Round
1980	Mark Berson	12–5–2	—	
1981	Mark Berson	16–4–1	—	
1982	Mark Berson	12–5–2	—	
1983	Mark Berson	8–11–2	—	
1984	Mark Berson	14–4–2	—	
1985	Mark Berson	20–3–1	—	NCAA Quarterfinals
1986	Mark Berson	17–5–0	—	NCAA First Round
1987	Mark Berson	16–2–3	—	NCAA Second Round
1988	Mark Berson	14–4–4	—	NCAA Semi-finals
1989	Mark Berson	17–3–2	—	NCAA Quarterfinals
1990	Mark Berson	14–5–2	—	NCAA Second Round
1991	Mark Berson	14–5–0	—	
1992	Mark Berson	13–5–3	—	NCAA First Round
Metro Conference
1993	Mark Berson	16–4–4	4–0–1	Metro Champions; NCAA Runners-up
1994	Mark Berson	16–4	4–1–0	NCAA First Round
Independent
1995	Mark Berson	16–4–0	—	NCAA Second Round
1996	Mark Berson	8–9–2	—	
1997	Mark Berson	16–3–1	—	NCAA Second Round
1998	Mark Berson	16–5–0	—	NCAA Second Round
1999	Mark Berson	10–7–2	—	
2000	Mark Berson	12–4–3	—	NCAA First Round
2001	Mark Berson	12–5–2	—	NCAA Second Round
2002	Mark Berson	11–8–1	—	NCAA First Round
2003	Mark Berson	9–7–2	—	
2004	Mark Berson	12–7–1	—	NCAA First Round
Conference USA
2005	Mark Berson	12–7–2	7–1–1	Conference USA Tournament Champions; NCAA First Round
2006	Mark Berson	11–5–1	4–3–1	
2007	Mark Berson	11–6–2	4–2–2	
2008	Mark Berson	8–6–5	2–2–4	
2009	Mark Berson	7–8–3	2–4–2	
2010	Mark Berson	13–7–2	4–2–2	Conference USA Tournament Champions; NCAA Third Round
2011	Mark Berson	9–7–3	6–1–1	Conference USA Regular Season Champions; NCAA First Round
2012	Mark Berson	5–11–2	2–5–1	
2013	Mark Berson	7–7–5	4–2–3	
2014	Mark Berson	10–10–0	3–5–0	
2015	Mark Berson	11–8–2	6–2–0	NCAA Second Round
2016	Mark Berson	11–8–1	5–2–1	NCAA Second Round
2017	Mark Berson	6–9–2	2–4–2	
2018	Mark Berson	7–10–0	2–6–0	
2019	Mark Berson	7–9–2	2–5–0	
2020	Mark Berson	8–7–1	2–4–1	
2021	Tony Annan	5–9–2	1–5–2	
Sun Belt Conference
2022	Tony Annan	5-8-4	1-4-3	
2023	Tony Annan	6-9-3	3-4-2	
2024	Tony Annan	10-5-2	5-4	
2025	Tony Annan	7-9-2	1-5-2	
2026	Tony Annan	7-0-0	1-0-0	

== Championships ==
- Metro Conference: 1993
- Conference USA: 2005, 2010, 2011

== Records ==
=== All-Time career leaders ===
==== Scoring ====
Career Points
Rank	Player	Goals	Assists	Points	Years
1	Doug Allison	63	32	158	1984–87
2	Chris Faklaris	55	14	124	1991–94
3	Clint Mathis	53	15	121	1994–97
4	Clark Brisson	36	26	98	1987–90
5	Dan Ratcliff	37	20	94	1983–86
6	Jordan Quinn	37	13	87	1999-02
7	Andrew Coggins	33	15	81	1988–91
8	Brian Winstead	33	14	80	1978–79
9	Billy Baumhoff	22	34	78	1991–94
9	Rob Smith	19	40	78	1991–94

Career Goals
Rank	Player	Goals	Years
1	Doug Allison	63	1984–87
2	Chris Faklaris	55	1991–94
3	Clint Mathis	53	1994–97
4	Dan Ratcliff	37	1983–86
4	Jordan Quinn	37	1999-02
6	Clark Brisson	36	1987–90
7	Andrew Coggins	33	1988–91
7	Brian Winstead	33	1978–79
9	Dave Goodchild	28	1992–2004
9	John Harr	28	1997–99

Career Assists
Rank	Player	Assists	Years
1	Rob Smith	40	1991–94
2	Billy Baumhoff	34	1991–94
3	Doug Allison	32	1984–87
4	Rubén Tufiño	30	1989–92
5	Clark Brisson	26	1987–90
6	Arni Arnthorsson	25	1984–87
7	Grenville Pope	23	1985–88
8	Mike Sambursky	22	2003–2006
9	Dan Ratcliff	20	1983–86
9	John Harr	20	1997–99
9	Scott Cook	20	1985–87
9	Matt Haiduk	20	1989–93

==== Goalkeeping ====
Career Goals-Against Average
Rank	Player	GAA	Years
1	Charles Arndt	0.70	1985–88
2	Chris Foley	0.72	1986–89
3	Paul Turin	0.86	1978–79
4	Henry Ring	1.03	1997-00
4	John Mills	1.03	1987–90

Career Shutouts
Rank	Player	Shutouts	Years
1	Charles Arndt	29.5	1985–88
2	Jimmy Maurer	28	2007–10
3	Henry Ring	25.5	1997-00
4	David Turner	21.5	1990–93
5	Glen Thompson	21	1980, 82–84

=== Single season records ===
Points: 53, Clint Mathis-1995
Goals: 25, Clint Mathis-1995
Assists: 16, Rubén Tufiño-1989
GAA: 0.49, Charles Arndt-1987
Shutouts: 13, Warren Lipka – 1985

== Notable former players ==
=== Current professionals ===
- Joshua Alcala – Free Agent
- Bradlee Baladez – FC Dallas
- Blake Brettschneider – Rochester Rhinos
- Brad Guzan – Atlanta United, United States men's national soccer team
- Tim Hankinson – Head coach of Indy Eleven
- Makan Hislop – United Petrotrin, Trinidad and Tobago national football team
- Jimmy Maurer – New York Cosmos
- Janny Rivera – Atlanta Silverbacks
- Jack Cummings - Cleveland City
- Tyler Ruthven – Miami FC
- Joey Worthen – Head coach of Florida Atlantic Men's Soccer Team
- Braeden Troyer – Richmond Kickers

=== Retired professionals ===
- Clint Mathis – Los Angeles Galaxy, New York Red Bulls, Hannover 96, Colorado Rapids, Ergotelis, Real Salt Lake; Former member of US National Team
- Josh Wolff – Sporting Kansas City, 1860 Munich, D.C. United; Former member of US National Team
- Eric Hawkes – Played 5 Seasons for Maryland Bays in the ASL & APSL National Champions.
- Doug Allison – Played 5 seasons in the NPSL; Current Furman men's soccer coach
- Paul Turin – Played for the Tulsa Roughnecks of the NASL
- Henry Ring – Chicago Fire
- Clark Brisson – Charleston Battery
- Rob Smith – Columbus Crew
- Rubén Tufiño – Played in Liga de Fútbol Profesional Boliviano, most notably with Blooming and Bolivar; earned 35 caps for Bolivian National Team
- Mike Gosselin – earned one cap for US National Team
- Billy Clifford – played three seasons for the Jacksonville Cyclones
- Ray Vigliotti – Played for the Miami Americans of the ASL; played for the New York Arrows, Tampa Bay Rowdies, Baltimore Blast, and Wichita Wings of the Major Indoor Soccer League
- Richard Wurdack – Played for the Denver Avalanche and Kansas City Comets of the Major Indoor Soccer League
- Warren Lipka – Played for the Fort Wayne Flames, Indiana Kick, and the Detroit Rockers of the American Indoor Soccer Association
- Scott Cook – Played for the Maryland Bays of the American Professional Soccer League
- Charles Arndt – Played for the Maryland Bays of the ASL

=== In other fields ===
- Jim Sonefeld – Went on to become drummer for Hootie & the Blowfish.
