= 2004 South Carolina Gamecocks men's soccer team =

American college soccer season

2004 Season
Head coach	Mark Berson
Conference	Independent
Record	12–7–1
NCAA Tournament	First Round
Leading Scorer(s)	Sebastian Lindholm (6 goals)

The following contains the names of the members of the 2004 South Carolina Gamecocks men's soccer team and the results of each match. The 2004 season was a successful one for Gamecock soccer that would include a berth in the NCAA Tournament, their 17th all-time. The team finished the season with a 12–7–1 record that included four wins over top-25 opponents. The 2004 roster was a star-studded one that included three future professionals; Brad Guzan, Mike Sambursky, and Josh Alcala.

== Roster ==
Note: Flags indicate national team as defined under FIFA eligibility rules; some limited exceptions apply. Players may hold more than one non-FIFA nationality.

No.	Pos.	Nation	Player
0	GK	USA	Brad Guzan
3	DF	USA	Eric Szeszycki
4	DF	USA	Ramon Paracat
5	DF	USA	Daniel Upchurch
6	MF	USA	Mike Sambursky
7	FW	SWE	Sebastian Lindholm
8	MF	USA	Jeff Gross
9	FW	ENG	Ayo Akinsete
10	FW	USA	Josh Alcala
11	DF	USA	Ryan Leeton
12	MF	BRA	Jose Ramos

No.	Pos.	Nation	Player
13	FW	USA	Ryan Deter
14	DF	USA	Matt King
15	DF	USA	Stephen Sprague
17	DF	USA	Greg Reece
18	DF	TRI	Makan Hislop
19	MF	USA	J.D. Moon
20	DF	USA	Cody Perrot
22	FW	USA	Phil Beene
23	FW	USA	Derek Law

== Results ==
Date	Opponent	Location	Result	Attendance	Record
Pre-season
Thurs., Aug. 26	Virginia	Columbia, South Carolina	T 0–0	(unknown)	0–0–0
Regular Season
Wed., Sep. 1	William and Mary	Columbia, South Carolina	W 2–1	582	1–0–0
Sat., Sep. 4	Winthrop	Rock Hill, South Carolina	W 2–0	202	2–0–0
Fri., Sep. 10	#16Portland	Columbia, South Carolina	W 3–2	1,018	3–0–0
Sun., Sep.12	Bucknell	Columbia, South Carolina	W 1–0	1,008	4–0–0
Fri., Sep. 17	Penn	Philadelphia, Pennsylvania	L 0–1	125	4–1–0
Sun., Sep. 19	Princeton	Philadelphia, Pennsylvania	T 2–2	125	4–1–1
Fri., Sep. 24	#13 Wake Forest	Winston-Salem, North Carolina	W 1–0	2,676	5–1–1
Wed., Sept. 29	Davidson	Davidson, North Carolina	W 4–1	821	6–1–1
Sun., Oct. 3	Gardner–Webb	Columbia, South Carolina	W 3–0	782	7–1–1
Sun., Oct. 10	Clemson	Columbia, South Carolina	W 1–0	4,312	8–1–1
Wed., Oct. 13	#8 Charlotte	Columbia, South Carolina	L 0–1	342	8–2–1
Sat., Oct. 16	North Carolina	Chapel Hill, North Carolina	L 0–2	821	8–3–1
Wed., Oct. 20	College of Charleston	Charleston, South Carolina	L 0–3	1,636	8–4–1
Sat., Oct., 23	UNC-Wilmington	Wilmington, North Carolina	W 3–1	536	9–4–1
Wed., Oct. 27	#7 Furman	Columbia, South Carolina	L 0–1	482	9–5–1
Sun., Oct. 31	#13Duke	Columbia, South Carolina	W 1–0	631	10–5–1
Fri., Nov. 5	Coastal Carolina	Charleston, South Carolina	L 2–3	204	10–6–1
Sun, Nov. 7	Alabama A&M	Charleston, South Carolina	W 3–2	207	11–6–1
Sun., Nov. 14	#21 FIU	Columbia, South Carolina	W 3–1	579	12–6–1
NCAA Tournament
Fri., Nov 19	College of Charleston	Columbia, South Carolina	L 2–3	1,266	12–7–1

== See also ==
- South Carolina Gamecocks
