= 2005 South Carolina Gamecocks men's soccer team =

American college soccer season

2004 Season
Head coach	Mark Berson
Conference	CUSA
Record	12–7–2
Conference Record	7–1–1
CUSA Tournament	Champions
NCAA tournament	First Round
Leading Scorer(s)	Mike Sambursky (7 goals)

The following contains the names of the members of the 2005 South Carolina Gamecocks men's soccer team and the results of each match. The 2005 season was the first in which the Gamecocks were members of Conference USA. Up until 2005 they had competed as an NCAA Independent because the SEC does not sponsor men's soccer.

The year turned out to be a successful one for the Gamecocks. The gamecocks would topple three top-15 opponents, finish the regular season with a conference record of 7–1–1 in their first year, and beat Tulsa for the conference tournament crown on national television. Unfortunately for the Gamecocks, their season ended in a heart-breaking 2–0 loss to the Wake Forest Demon Deacons in the first round of the NCAA tournament.

== Roster ==
Note: Flags indicate national team as defined under FIFA eligibility rules; some limited exceptions apply. Players may hold more than one non-FIFA nationality.

No.	Pos.	Nation	Player
1	GK	USA	Mike Gustavson
2	DF	USA	Ralph Pace
3	DF	USA	Eric Szeszycki
4	DF	USA	Ramon Paracat
5	DF	USA	Daniel Upchurch
6	MF	USA	Mike Sambursky
7	FW	USA	Kyle Franklin
8	MF	USA	Jeff Gross
9	FW	ENG	Ayo Akinsete
10	FW	USA	Josh Alcala
11	DF	USA	Ryan Leeton
12	MF	USA	Rob Charest

No.	Pos.	Nation	Player
13	FW	USA	Ryan Deter
14	DF	USA	Matt King
15	DF	USA	Stephen Sprague
17	DF	USA	Greg Reece
18	DF	TRI	Makan Hislop
19	MF	USA	J.D. Moon
20	MF	USA	David Smith
21	MF	USA	Kevan Hawkins
22	MF	USA	Brennan Williams
23	MF	USA	Spencer Lewis
24	MF	USA	David Ross

== Results ==
Date	Opponent	Location	Result	Record	Conference record
Pre-season
Sat., Aug. 27	Coastal Carolina	Columbia, SC	W 2–1	0–0–0	0–0–0
Regular season
Fri., Sep. 2	Clemson	Clemson, SC	L 1–2 (2OT)	0–1–0	0–0–0
Tues., Sep. 6	College of Charleston	Columbia, SC	L 0–1	0–2–0	0–0–0
Fri., Sep. 9	#16 Wake Forest	Chapel Hill, NC	L 0–3	0–3–0	0–0–0
Sun., Sep.11	#2 North Carolina	Chapel Hill, NC	L 0–2	0–4–0	0–0–0
Fri., Sep. 16	Penn	Columbia, SC	L 0–2	0–5–0	0–0–0
Sun., Sep. 18	Loyola Chicago	Columbia, SC	W 2–1	1–5–0	0–0–0
Wed., Sep. 21	#25 UNC Wilmington	Columbia, SC	W 4–2	2–5–0	0–0–0
Sat., Sept. 24	Charlotte	Charlotte, NC	W 2–1 (OT)	3–5–0	0–0–0
Sun., Oct. 2	East Carolina*	Greenville, NC	W 5–2	4–5–0	1–0–0
Friday., Oct. 7	Memphis*	Memphis, TN	T 2–2	4–5–1	1–0–1
Sun., Oct. 9	#8 UAB	Birmingham, AL	W 2–1	5–5–1	2–0–1
Fri., Oct. 14	Kentucky*	Columbia, SC	W 1–0	6–5–1	3–0–1
Sun., Oct. 16	Marshall*	Columbia, SC	L 0–1	6–6–1	3–1–1
Fri., Oct., 28	Tulsa*	Columbia, SC	W 4–1	7–6–1	4–1–1
Sun., Oct. 30	#9 SMU*	Columbia, SC	W 3–0	8–6–1	5–1–1
Fri., Nov. 4	FIU*	Miami, FL	W 3–1	9–6–1	6–1–1
Sun., Nov. 6	UCF*	Orlando, FL	W 4–1	10–6–1	7–1–1
CUSA tournament
Wed., Nov. 9	Kentucky	Dallas, TX	T 0–0 (Won on PK'S)	10–6–2	First Round
Fri., Nov. 11	Memphis	Dallas, TX	W 2–1	11–6–2	Semi-final
Sun., Nov. 13	Tulsa	Dallas, TX	W 1–0	12–6–2	Final
NCAA tournament
Fri., Nov 19	Wake Forest	Winston-Salem, NC	L 0–2	12–7–2	First Round

^{*}Conference Game

== See also ==
- South Carolina Gamecocks
