= 1979 South Carolina Gamecocks men's soccer team =

American college soccer season

1978
Head coach	Mark Berson
Conference	NCAA Independent
Record	14-5
NCAA Tournament	First Round
Leading Scorer(s)	Brian Winstead (15 goals)

The Gamecocks' 1979 season was the program's second ever, and is noted for the new program reaching the NCAA Division I Men's Soccer Tournament for the first time.

The Gamecocks finished with their second consecutive winning record, at 14-5. They faced the Clemson Tigers in their first match of the 1979 tournament, losing 1–0 to the more established (eighth tournament) Clemson squad.

This season was also the last at Carolina for senior Brian Winstead, who would leave the school as the leading goal-scorer in school history (a title he would hold for seven years); and Paul Turin, a star goalkeeper who would go on to play for the Tulsa Roughnecks in the NASL.

== Roster ==
- David Burr
- Mike Devine
- Roy Dunshee
- David Goodchild
- Eric Hawkes
- Chris Heidelberger
- Thom Heath
- Jake Heilich
- Jim Heilich
- Wattie Langston
- Pat Layden
- Mike Mousaw
- Ed Muehlheausler
- John Murphy
- John Nitardy
- Dan Potter
- Tom Reilly
- Joel Schmiedeke
- Paul Stockwell
- John Tremeont
- Paul Turin
- Raymond Vigliotti
- Boo Westin
- David Whittington
- Brian Winstead
- Richard Wurdack

== Results ==
Date	Opponent	Location	Result	Record
Regular Season
Sept. 11	Erskine	Columbia, SC	W 3-1	1-0-0
Sept. 14	UCONN	Columbia, SC	L 0-5	1-1-0
Sept. 26	UNC Wilmington	Columbia, SC	W 3-2	2-1-0
Sept. 19	Winthrop	Columbia, SC	W 4-0	3-1-0
Sept. 23	Georgia State University	Columbia, SC	W 4-1	4-1-0
Sept. 28	at East Carolina	Greenville, NC	W 2-1	5-1-0
Oct. 3	at College of Charleston	Charleston, SC	W 2-1	6-1-0
Oct. 8	Emory	Columbia, SC	W 4-1	7-1-0
Oct. 10	at Francis Marion	Florence, SC	W 6-0	8-1-0
Oct. 14	at Clemson	Clemson, SC	L 0-1	8-2-0
Oct. 19	Indiana^{#}	Wheaton, IL	L 0-1	8-3-0
Oct. 20	at Wheaton^{#}	Wheaton, IL	W 1-0	9-3-0
Oct. 22	at Furman	Greenville, SC	W 5-1	10-3-0
Oct. 28	Appalachian State	Columbia, SC	W 3-1	11-3-0
Oct. 31	Western Carolina	Columbia, SC	W 6-0	12-3-0
Nov. 3	at Rollins	Winter Park, FL	L 0-1	12-4-0
Nov. 5	at UCF	Orlando, FL	W 1-0	13-4-0
Nov. 8	Charleston Southern	Columbia, SC	W 3-0	14-4-0
NCAA Tournament
Nov. 25	Clemson	Clemson, SC	L 0-1	14-5-0

# Wheat Classic

== See also ==
- South Carolina Gamecocks
