= Dan O'Keefe (soccer) =

American soccer player

Dan O’Keefe
Personal information
- Place of birth: St. Louis, Missouri, U.S.
- Position: Forward

College career
Years	Team	Apps	(Gls)
1980–1983	SIU Edwardsville Cougars		

Senior career*
Years	Team	Apps	(Gls)
1983–?	Kansas City Comets (indoor)		
1986–1988	Fort Wayne Flames (indoor)	65	(49)
1989–1990	Indiana Kick (indoor)	40	(108)
1990–1992	Detroit Rockers (indoor)	78	(130)
1992–1993	St. Louis Ambush (indoor)	40	(60)
1993–1994	Baltimore Spirit (indoor)	32	(32)
1994–1995	Detroit Rockers (indoor)	8	(6)
- * Club domestic league appearances and goals

Dan O’Keefe is an American retired soccer forward who played over ten seasons in the U.S. indoor leagues. He led the American Indoor Soccer Association in scoring in 1989.

== Youth ==
O’Keefe grew up in St. Louis where he attended McCluer High School and then attended Southern Illinois University Edwardsville where he played on the men's soccer team from 1980 to 1983. In 1982, he led the team in scoring with thirteen goals and finished his four-year career ranked twelfth on the school's career goals list with twenty-seven.

== Professional ==
In October 1983, the Kansas City Comets selected O’Keefe in the second round of the Major Indoor Soccer League (MISL) Draft. In 1986, he played for the Bridgeton Soccer Club of St. Louis Played with the Fort Wayne Flames of the American Indoor Soccer Association (AISA) from 1986 to 1988. O'Keefe briefly retired from playing following the 1988 season to coach in Jefferson City, Missouri. He returned in 1989 to lead the AISA in goal scoring with the Indiana Kick. In 1990, he moved from the Kick to the Detroit Rockers. That year, the AISA renamed itself the National Professional Soccer League (NPSL). He was selected as a first team NPSL All Star for the 1991–1992 season. In 1992, he signed with the St. Louis Ambush. On June 18, 1993, the Ambush traded O’Keefe to the Baltimore Spirit for Steve Boardman. He played one season in Baltimore before returning to the Rockers in 1994. He played only eight games in 1994–1995. After that, there is no further record of him until an Ambush reunion game in 2005.

== Fort Wayne Flames career stats ==
=== Regular season ===
- Games Played – 65
- Goals – 49
- Assists – 18
- Points – 67
- Blocked Shots – 9
- Fouls – 70
- Penalty Minutes – 2

=== Playoffs ===
- Games Played – 11
- Goals – 14*
- Assists – 7
- Points – 21*
- Shots on Goal – 59*

Fouls – 8

- Penalty Minutes – 2.

(* = career franchise leader)
