= Tom Alioto =

American soccer defender (born 1958)

Personal information
- Date of birth: May 20, 1958 (age 68)
- Place of birth: Milwaukee, Wisconsin, United States
- Height: 5 ft 9 in (1.75 m)
- Position: Defender

Youth career
- Milwaukee Bavarians

Senior career*
Years	Team	Apps	(Gls)
1980–1981	Chicago Sting (indoor)	13	(2)
1982–1983	Oklahoma City Slickers		
1982–1984	Kansas City Comets (indoor)	26	(1)
1984–1985	Milwaukee Wave (indoor)	28	(19)
1985–1986	Louisville Thunder (indoor)	39	(9)
1986	Houston Dynamos		
1986–1987	Fort Wayne Flames (indoor)	42	(9)
1987–1988	Milwaukee Wave (indoor)	54	(15)
1988–1989	Hershey Impact (indoor)	40	(11)
1989	Milwaukee Wave (indoor)	6	(0)
1989–1990	Chicago Power (indoor)	37	(8)
1994	Bavarian Leinenkugel		
1995	Milwaukee Rampage		

Managerial career
- 1986–1987: Fort Wayne Flames
- 1987–1988: Milwaukee Wave (assistant)
- Milwaukee Kickers (assistant)
- 1994: Bavarian Leinenkugel
- 2000–2001: Milwaukee Rampage (assistant)
- * Club domestic league appearances and goals

Tom Alioto (born May 20, 1958, in Milwaukee, Wisconsin) is an American retired soccer defender who played in the North American Soccer League, Major Indoor Soccer League and American Indoor Soccer Association.

== Player ==
Both Tom Alioto and his twin brother Tim both played extensively as youth players with the Milwaukee Bavarians. Alioto also played soccer for Madison University High School. In 1980, Tom signed with the Chicago Sting in the North American Soccer League for the 1980–81 indoor season. In 1982, he moved to the Oklahoma City Slickers in the American Soccer League. In the fall of 1982, Alioto signed with the Kansas City Comets of the Major Indoor Soccer League. He played two seasons with the Comets before moving to the Milwaukee Wave of the American Indoor Soccer Association. He was leading the team in scoring when he was injured, along with several other players, in January 1985. The Wave released him at the end of the season despite his being First Team All Star and he signed with the Louisville Thunder. In 1986, he played for the independent Houston Dynamos. In the fall of 1986, he became a player-assistant coach with the expansion Fort Wayne Flames. In October 1987, the Flames sold Alioto's contract to the Wave for an undisclosed amount of cash. He then moved to the Hershey Impact for the 1988–1989 season. In January 1990, Alioto rejoined the Wave. Alioto then dedicated himself to coaching and only played at the amateur level for several years. In 1994, Alioto both coached and played for Bavarian Leinenkugel when it went to the final of the 1994 U.S. Open Cup. In April 1995, Alioto signed with the Milwaukee Rampage of the USISL.

== Coach ==
In 1986, Alioto signed with the Fort Wayne Flames of the American Indoor Soccer Association as a player-assistant coach. He was quickly elevated to head coach after original head coach Cliff Brown took the team to a 2–3 start. In 1987, he moved to the Milwaukee Wave as a player-assistant coach. In March 2009, Alioto joined the staff of the FC Milwaukee Nationals soccer club.

Alioto is a member of the Wisconsin Soccer Association Hall of Fame.
