= Randy Prescott =

American soccer player (born 1964)

Personal information
- Date of birth: April 18, 1964 (age 62)
- Place of birth: Redondo Beach, California, U.S.
- Height: 5 ft 6 in (1.68 m)
- Position: Midfielder

Youth career
- 1982–1985: Fresno State Bulldogs

Senior career*
Years	Team	Apps	(Gls)
1986–1987	Chicago Sting (indoor)	8	(1)
1987–1989	Fort Wayne Flames (indoor)	60	(15)
1989–1990	Indiana Kick (indoor)		
1990–2001	Detroit Rockers (indoor)		
1994	San Jose Grizzlies (indoor)	28	(15)
- * Club domestic league appearances and goals

Randy Prescott is an American retired soccer midfielder who played professionally in the Major Indoor Soccer League, National Professional Soccer League and Continental Indoor Soccer League.

Prescott graduated from Santa Teresa High School in San Jose, California. He attended Fresno State University where he played soccer from 1982 to 1985. He is in the top five for career goals, assists and points. On June 2, 1986, the Chicago Sting selected Prescott in the third round of the MISL College Draft. He played eight games and was released at the end of the season. He had trials with the Los Angeles Lazers and San Diego Sockers before signing with the Fort Wayne Flames of the American Indoor Soccer Association where he played from 1987 to 1989. The Flames folded in the fall of 1989. The league quickly replaced it with the Indiana Kick. Prescott signed with the Kick. He played one season with Indiana before moving to the Detroit Rockers of the National Professional Soccer League on October 19, 1990. He remained with the Rockers until it folded in 2001. In August 2001, the Harrisburg Heat selected Prescott in the dispersal draft. Prescott chose to retire. While playing for the Rockers, Prescott also played the 1994 summer indoor season with the San Jose Grizzlies of the Continental Indoor Soccer League.
