= Steve Boardman =

Steve Boardman may refer to:

- Steve Boardman (historian), Scottish medieval historian
- Steve Boardman (soccer) (born 1964), retired American soccer defender
