= Janine Szpara =

American soccer player and coach (born 1967)

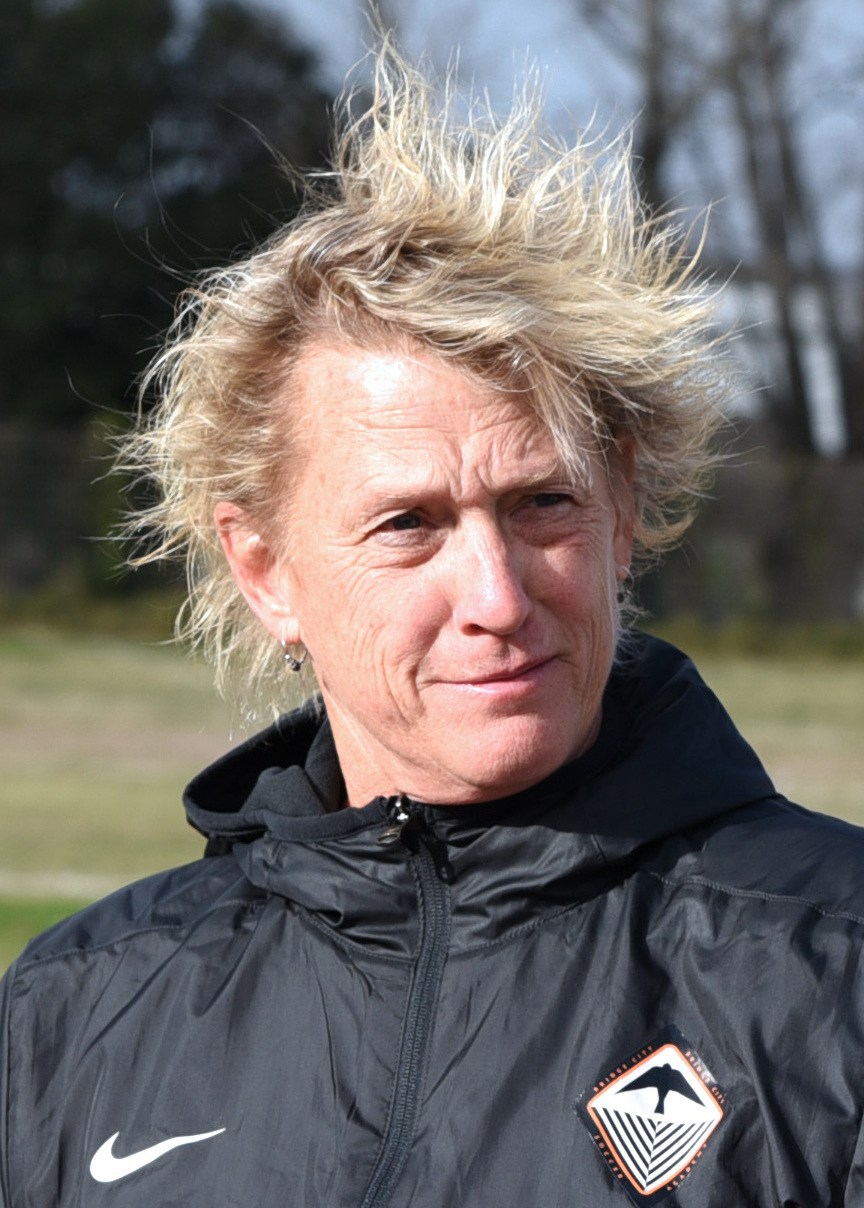
- Szpara in 2023

Personal information
- Full name: Janine Marie Szpara
- Date of birth: January 11, 1967 (age 59)
- Place of birth: Chicago, Illinois, U.S.
- Height: 5 ft 7 in (1.70 m)
- Position: Goalkeeper

College career
Years	Team	Apps	(Gls)
1985–1988	Colorado College Tigers	78	(0)

Senior career*
Years	Team	Apps	(Gls)
1995–199?	Shiroki FC Serena		
199?–1999	Takarazuka Bunnys Ladies SC		
1997	Norcal Shockwaves		
2000	Foothill FC		
2001	Bay Area CyberRays	1	(0)

International career
1986–1987	United States	6	(0)

Managerial career
- 1989–1990: Stanford Cardinal (assistant)
- 1990–1992: California Golden Bears (assistant)
- Shiroki FC Serena (assistant)
- 2000: Cornell Big Red (assistant)
- 2002: Santa Clara Broncos (assistant)
- 2003: San Jose State Spartans (assistant)
- 2004–2006: Warner Pacific Knights (associate HC)
- 2004–2010: Tualatin Hills United SC
- 2008–2011: Portland State Vikings (assistant)
- 2011–2012: Portland Rain
- 2011–: Clackamas Cougars
- 2014–: Portland Thorns Academy
- 2016–: FC Mulhouse Portland
- 2018: St. Mary's Blues (assistant)
- 2018: St. Mary's Blues JV
- * Club domestic league appearances and goals

Janine Marie Szpara (born January 11, 1967) is an American former soccer player and coach who played as a goalkeeper, making six appearances for the United States women's national team.

== Career ==
In college, Szpara played for the Colorado College Tigers from 1985 to 1988, with the team's best result in 1986 as NCAA runners-up. She was selected as an NSCAA First-Team All-American in all four seasons, and in 1988 was the ISAA Goalkeeper of the Year. She was also included in the Senior Recognition Team in 1988. In total, she made 78 appearances for the Tigers. She holds the record for the most shutouts at the school, with 46 during her career, along with the best save percentage and fewest average goals conceded.

Szpara made her international debut for the United States on July 20, 1986 in the Mundialito against China PR. In total, she made six appearances for the U.S., earning her final cap on July 11, 1987 in the 1987 North America Cup against Norway.

In club soccer, Szpara played for Shiroki FC Serena and Takarazuka Bunnys Ladies SC in Japan from 1995 to 1999, and was selected to the league's All-Star Team in 1998. She also played in the WPSL for the Norcal Shockwaves in 1997 and Foothill FC in 2001. She played for the Bay Area CyberRays during the 2001 WUSA season, replacing the injured Jen Mead, with the team ultimately winning the WUSA championship. She made one appearance for the CyberRays during the season.

Szpara later began to work as a coach, holding a U.S. Soccer 'A' license and primarily focusing on goalkeeper training. She worked as an assistant for the Stanford Cardinal from 1989 to 1999 and the California Golden Bears in 1992. While playing in Japan, she also began to coach at Shiroki FC Serena. After returning to the U.S., she worked as an assistant for the Cornell Big Red in 2000, Santa Clara Broncos in 2002, San Jose State Spartans in 2003, and Warner Pacific Knights as an associate head coach from 2004 to 2006. From 2008 to 2011, she worked as an assistant for the Portland State Vikings, before becoming the head coach of the Portland Rain club team, where she remained until 2012, and Clackamas Cougars collegiate team in 2011. In 2018, Szpara coached at St. Mary's Academy in Portland, Oregon, working as the assistant for the varsity team and head coach of the junior varsity team. In youth soccer, she worked as a coach for the Olympic Development Program in California from 1989 to 1992, and in Oregon from 2006 to 2017. She was the coordinator for the Cornell Youth Camp from 2002 to 2004, and worked at Oregon Youth Soccer as well as Tualatin Hills United Soccer Club, where she was an assistant director and the coach of various boys' youth teams. She has also worked in various roles at the youth clubs Portland Spartans FC/FC Mulhouse Portland and Portland Thorns Academy.

Szpara has traveled to coach youth soccer as a sports envoy for the U.S. State Department, having led clinics in Guatemala, Indonesia, Malaysia, Mexico, Singapore, and Vietnam.

Szpara was inducted into the Colorado College Athletic Hall of Fame in 1995. She was also inducted into the school's Hall of Fame in 2006 as a member of the 1986 women's soccer team. In 2017, she was inducted into the Colorado Springs Sports Hall of Fame.

== Personal life ==
Though born in Chicago, Szpara grew up in San Jose, California, and attended Valley Christian High School. She graduated with a Bachelor of Arts in history from Colorado College in 1989.

== Career statistics ==
=== International ===
United States
Year	Apps	Goals
1986	4	0
1987	2	0
Total	6	0
