= Bill Becher =

American soccer player (born 1965)

Personal information
- Full name: William Becher
- Date of birth: February 15, 1965 (age 61)
- Place of birth: Wheeling, West Virginia, United States
- Height: 5 ft 11 in (1.80 m)
- Position: Midfielder

College career
Years	Team	Apps	(Gls)
1984–1985	Lewis and Clark Trailblazers		
1986–1987	Sangamon State Prairie Stars		

Senior career*
Years	Team	Apps	(Gls)
1987–1989	Fort Wayne Flames (indoor)	32	(6)
1989–1990	Indiana Kick (indoor)		
1990–1991	New York Kick (indoor)		
1991	Colorado Foxes	15	(2)
1991–1999	Harrisburg Heat (indoor)	315	(227)
1993–1994	Arizona Sandsharks (indoor)		
1999–2000	St. Louis Ambush (indoor)	36	(19)
Total		458	(280)

Managerial career
- 2004–2017: Harrisburg City Islanders
- * Club domestic league appearances and goals

Bill Becher (born 15 February 1965) is an American former soccer player and head coach.

== Playing coach ==
=== Youth ===
Born in West Virginia, Becher grew up in St. Louis. He began his collegiate career at Lewis and Clark Community College. He then transferred to Sangamon State University. In 1986, Becher was a Third Team NAIA All American. In 1987, he scored the winning goal as Sangamon won the NAIA national men's soccer championship and Becher was named the tournament MVP.

=== Professional ===
In 1987, Becher turned professional with the Fort Wayne Flames of the American Indoor Soccer Association. He played two season with the Flames. When the Flames folded in 1989, Becher moved to the newly created Indiana Kick. In 1990, the Kick moved to New York to become the New York Kick. Becher began the 1990-1991 AISA season with the Kick, but left the team in January 1991 after the team cut salaries. In 1991, Becher played for the Colorado Foxes in the American Professional Soccer League. In 1993 and 1994, Becher played summer seasons with the Arizona Sandsharks of the Continental Indoor Soccer League. On October 22, 1999, the Heat traded Becher to the St. Louis Ambush for undisclosed considerations. He spent one season with the Ambush, then retired from professional soccer. He also played for the Hershey Impact.

== Coaching statistics ==
Team	From	To	Record				
Team	From	To	G	W	D	L	Win %
(United States) Harrisburg City Islanders	September 24, 2003	January 23, 2018	376	152	95	129	40.43
Total			376	152	95	129	40.43

== Honors ==
- 2005 United Soccer Leagues Coach of the Year
- 2007 USL Second Division Championship
- 2011 USL Pro Finalist
- 2014 USL Pro Finalist
