= 1997 Copa Bolivia =

Tournament details
- Country: Bolivia
- Teams: 31

Final positions
- Champions: Oriente Petrolero (8th title)
- Runners-up: The Strongest

Tournament statistics
- Matches played: 114
- Goals scored: 123 (1.08 per match)
- Top goal scorer: Álvaro Peña (14 goals)

The 1997 is the second edition of the Copa Bolivia. The Copa Bolivia would start in January and end in October.

== Qualifying rounds ==
=== First qualifying round ===
Team 1	Agg.	Team 2	1st leg	2nd leg
31 de Octubre	2–4	Club Litoral	2–1	0–3
Bolivar Nimbles	3–5	Always Ready	2–3	1–2
Real Charcas	2–1	Municipal de Tarija	1–1	1–0
Universitario de Potosi	4–3	Real Cochabamba	2–3	2–1

=== Second qualifying round ===
Team 1	Agg.	Team 2	1st leg	2nd leg
Universidad de Santa Cruz	0–1	Club Litoral	0–0	0–1
Always Ready	2–3	Chaco Petrolero	2–0	0–3
Universitario de Potosi	5–4	Real Charcas	4–4	1–0
Deportivo Cristal	2–1	Ferroviario F.C	1–1	1–0
Universitario de Pando	0–1	ABB	0–0	0–1
Universitario (Beni)	2–1	Primero de Mayo	2–1	0–0
Mariscal Braun	3–1	Enrique Happ	2–1	1–0
Fancesa	3–6	Club Stormers San Lorenzo	3–4	0–2

=== Third qualifying round ===
- 5 best Loser from the second round also qualified.

Team 1	Agg.	Team 2	1st leg	2nd leg
The Strongest	1–0	Club Litoral	0–0	1–0
Bolívar	4–1	Chaco Petrolero	2–1	2–0
San José	3–1	Universitario de Potosi	2–1	1–0
Independiente Petrolero	3–4	ABB	3–1	0–3
Municipal	2–1	Universitario (Beni)	1–1	1–0
Blooming	1–0	Deportivo Cristal	0–0	1–0
Guabirá	4–0	Mariscal Braun	3–0	1–0
Club Stormers San Lorenzo	1–2	Jorge Wilstermann	1–1	0–1
Real Charcas	3–2	Real Santa Cruz	2–2	1–0
Destroyers	1–0	Universitario de Pando	1–0	0–0
Always Ready	2–5	Oriente Petrolero	2–4	0–1
Ferroviario F.C	2–4	Primero de Mayo	2–2	0–2

== Group stage ==
One City would be hosting this group and its Santa Cruz de La Sierra.

=== Group A ===
Pos	Team	P	W	D	L	GF	GA	GD	Pts
1	Oriente Petrolero	5	5	0	0	10	4	+6	15
2	The Strongest	5	4	1	0	6	3	+3	14
3	Primero de Mayo	5	3	1	1	3	5	-2	10
4	Destroyers	5	2	1	2	3	7	–4	7
5	Real Charcas	5	2	0	3	2	8	–7	6
6	Jorge Wilstermann	5	0	3	2	2	9	–7	3

=== Group B ===
Pando would be hosting this group.

Pos	Team	P	W	D	L	GF	GA	GD	Pts
1	Guabirá	5	4	1	0	7	2	+5	14
2	Blooming	5	3	2	0	5	3	+2	11
3	Municipal	5	2	1	2	3	5	-2	7
4	ABB	5	2	1	2	3	7	–4	7
5	Bolivar	5	1	2	3	4	8	–4	5
6	San José	5	1	1	3	4	9	–5	4

=== Semi-final ===
Team 1	Agg.	Team 2	1st leg	2nd leg
The Strongest	1–0	Guabirá	0–0	1–0
Oriente Petrolero	2–1	Blooming	2–2	0–0

August 27
20:30

Oriente Petrolero	2 – 1	Blooming
Rubén Tufiño 54'; Álvaro Peña 86'

Estadio Ramón Tahuichi Aguilera, Santa Cruz
Attendance: 38,400

August 30
19:00

The Strongest	0 – 0	Guabirá

Estadio Hernando Siles, La Paz
Attendance: 34,000

September 25
21:00

Blooming	0 – 0	Oriente Petrolero

Estadio Ramón Tahuichi Aguilera, Santa Cruz

September 28
21:00

Guabirá	0 – 1	The Strongest
		Marcelo Torrico 49'

Estadio Gilberto Parada, Santa Cruz
Attendance: 23,000

=== Final ===
Team 1	Agg.	Team 2	1st leg	2nd leg
The Strongest	3–2	Oriente Petrolero	2–3	0–0

August 27
20:30

Oriente Petrolero	3 – 2	The Strongest
Rubén Tufiño 50' (64); Luis Gustavo 90'		Sandro Coelho] 23' (75)

Estadio Ramón Tahuichi Aguilera, Santa Cruz
Attendance: 38,400

August 30
19:00

The Strongest	0 – 0	Oriente Petrolero

Estadio Hernando Siles, La Paz
Attendance: 34,000

Copa Bolivia
1997 Champion

Oriente Petrolero
8th Title
