= Carlos Salguero =

Argentine footballer and coach

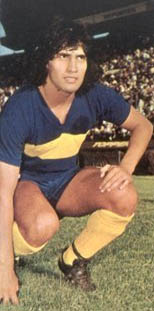

Personal information
- Full name: Carlos Roberto Salguero
- Date of birth: June 10, 1955
- Place of birth: Guaymallén, Argentina
- Date of death: December 26, 2006 (aged 51)
- Place of death: Tallahassee, FL, United States
- Position: Forward

Senior career*
Years	Team	Apps	(Gls)
1975–1976	Gimnasia y Esgrima (Mza)		
1977–1979	Boca Juniors	52	(11)
1980	Quilmes		
1980–1981	Calgary Boomers (indoor)	15	(15)
1981	Calgary Boomers	27	(3)
1981	Kansas City Comets (indoor)	7	(3)
1981–1984	Buffalo Stallions (indoor)	114	(101)
1982	→ Toronto Italia (loan)		
1983	Hamilton Steelers		
1984	Buffalo Storm	22	(11)
1984–1986	Kansas City Comets (indoor)	79	(35)
1986–1987	Toledo Pride (indoor)	42	(45)
1987–1988	Toronto Italia		
1987–1988	Fort Wayne Flames (indoor)	21	(11)
1988–1989	Indiana Kick (indoor)	11	(7)
1989–1990	Memphis Rogues (indoor)	29	(29)
1990	Toronto Italia		
1992	Buffalo Blizzard (indoor)	1	(0)

Managerial career
- 1990–1991: New York Kick (interim)
- 1990: Toronto Italia
- 1997–1998: Buffalo Blizzard
- * Club domestic league appearances and goals

Carlos Salguero (10 June 1955 – 26 December 2006) was an Argentine professional football forward. He died aged 51 from cancer in 2006. He spent one season in the North American Soccer League, one in the United Soccer League and nearly ten in various indoor leagues. Salguero also coached the Buffalo Blizzard of the National Professional Soccer League for one season.

== Career ==
Salguero began his professional career with Boca Juniors In 1981, he moved north to play for the Calgary Boomers in the North American Soccer League. In the fall of 1981, he signed with the Kansas City Comets of the Major Indoor Soccer League. The Comets traded him to the Buffalo Stallions in exchange for Yilmaz Orhan and Zoran Savic. Salguero quickly proved his worth as he became the team's all-time leading scorer over just two and a half seasons. The Stallions left the league following the 1983–1984 season. In 1982, he was loaned to play in the National Soccer League with Toronto Italia. In an exhibition game against Glasgow Celtic of Scotland, he was the dominant force in the Toronto Italia victory. After the game, the President of Toronto Italia Rocco LoFranco stated that he had never seen an attacker create such havoc in a defense. This game will go down in the annals of Toronto Italia history as one of the best games that Salguero had ever played. That summer Salguero played for the Buffalo Storm in the United Soccer League.

In 1983, he played in the Canadian Professional Soccer League with the Hamilton Steelers. In August 1984, Salguero signed with the Kansas City Comets. In the fall of 1986, Salguero jumped leagues when he signed with the Toledo Pride of the American Indoor Soccer Association. In the summer of 1987 he returned to play with Toronto Italia where he assisted in securing the Ontario-Quebec title by recording a goal against St-Leonard Corfinium. He also played in the 1988 NSL season with Toronto Italia.

After only one season in Toledo, he moved to the Fort Wayne Flames for the 1987–1988 season and the Indiana Kick for the 1988–1989 season. In the fall of 1989, he signed with the Memphis Rogues. The Rogues folded at the end of the season and Salguero moved to the New York Kick. In the fall of 1992, Salguero played one game for the Buffalo Blizzard in the NPSL.

== Managerial career ==
On December 31, 1990, the Kick named Salguero as the interim head coach. He went 1–4 as a coach, and with the team at the bottom of the standings, he was both fired as coach and waived as a player. In 1990, he returned to National Soccer League to former club Toronto Italia where he served as a player-coach.

In February 1997, the Blizzard brought Salguero into its coaching staff. On June 13, 1997, the Blizzard elevated him to head coach. He took the team into the playoffs, but was fired in July 1998.
