= Horst Fleps =

German footballer

Personal information
- Date of birth: April 3, 1961 (age 65)
- Place of birth: Wuppertal, West Germany
- Height: 5 ft 9 in (1.75 m)
- Position: Forward

Senior career*
Years	Team	Apps	(Gls)
1980–1981	Chicago Horizons (indoor)	14	(3)
1982–1983	Oklahoma City Slickers		
1984	Rochester Flash		
1984–1985	Canton Invaders (indoor)		
1985–1986	Chicago Shoccers (indoor)	7	(2)
1985–1987	Milwaukee Wave (indoor)	13	(1)
1987	Fort Wayne Flames (indoor)	8	(0)
- * Club domestic league appearances and goals

Horst Fleps (born April 3, 1961) is a German retired footballer who played as a forward in the Major Indoor Soccer League and United Soccer League.

In 1980 Fleps signed with the Chicago Horizons of the Major Indoor Soccer League, playing one season with the team. On July 14, 1982, he moved to the Oklahoma City Slickers of the American Soccer League. He had signed with the Slickers in February, but his West German citizenship prevented him from joining the team because it had its limit of foreign players. He gained his citizenship on July 13, 1982, and joined the Slickers the next day. Both the Slickers and the league collapsed after the 1983 season. On June 14, 1984, Fleps signed with the Rochester Flash of the United Soccer League for the 1984 outdoor season. That fall he moved back indoors with the Canton Invaders of the American Indoor Soccer Association. He then bounced to a new team each season until 1987.
