= ISAA Goalkeeper of the Year =

Collegiate soccer award

The ISAA Goalkeeper of the Year was an annual award created by the Intercollegiate Soccer Association of America (ISAA) to recognize the best U.S. college soccer goalkeeper. The ISAA began naming an annual men's Goalkeeper of the Year in 1983. In 1986, the ISAA began naming a women's Goalkeeper of the Year and continued to award this honor for both men and women through the 1995 season, the last year that any player was named. The NCAA recognizes these players in its record books.

== Men's Goalkeeper of the Year ==
- 1995 — Chris Snitko, UCLA
- 1994 — David Kramer, Fresno State
- 1993 — Bo Oshoniyi, Southern Connecticut State
- 1992 — Brad Friedel, UCLA
- 1991 — Kasey Keller, Portland
- 1990 — Juergen Sommer, Indiana
- 1989 — Anton Nistl, UCLA
- 1988 — Charles Arndt, South Carolina
- 1987 — Bob Willen, Virginia
- 1986 — Jeff Duback, Yale
- 1985 — Warren Lipka, South Carolina
- 1984 — Jim Leahy, Brandeis
- 1983 — Jamie Swanner, Clemson

== Women's Goalkeeper of the Year ==
- 1995 — Maja Hansen, New Hampshire
- 1994 — Jen Mead, George Mason
- 1993 — Briana Scurry, Massachusetts
- 1992 — Saskia Webber, Rutgers
- 1991 — Heather Taggart, Wisconsin
- 1990 — Karen Richter, UCF
- 1989 — Jen Starr, Vermont
- 1988 — Janine Szpara, Colorado College
- 1987 — Amy Allmann, UCF
- 1986 — Mary Harvey, California
