= 2001 South Carolina Gamecocks men's soccer team =

American college soccer season

2001 Season
Head coach	Mark Berson
Conference	Independent
Record	12-5-2
NCAA Tournament	Second Round
Leading Scorer(s)	Jordan Quinn (13 Goals)

The 2001 season for the Gamecock men's soccer team was a memorable one that featured marquee wins over opponents such as Furman, Penn State, and Wake Forest. After receiving a first-round bye in the NCAA tournament, they were knocked out by UAB on a golden goal in overtime.

== Roster ==
Number	Name
0	Michael Bachmeyer
1	Zac Jordan
2	Robert Rosenberg
3	Jonathan Rosenberg
4	Ryan Barber
5	Anthony Stovall
6	Time Glowienka
7	Dave Moore
8	Joey Worthen
9	Ryan Daley
11	Jacob Cavanaugh
12	Joey Vitagliano
14	Jon Rich
15	Jack Cummings
17	Ray Fischer
18	Kolby Runager
19	Udo Seidel
20	Jordan Smith
21	Jordan Quinn
22	Ryan Stocking
23	Chris Herron

== Results ==
Date	Opponent	Location	Result	Attendance	Record
Sun., Nov. 12	#12 Penn State	Columbia, SC	W 3-2	3,028	1-0-0
Fri., Sep. 7	#1 SMU	Charleston, SC	L 2-3	285	1-1-0
Sun., Sep. 9	TCU	Charleston, SC	W 3-0	461	2-1-0
Wed., Sep. 19	Charlotte	Charlotte, NC	W 1-0	846	3-1-0
Sun., Sep. 23	#24 Wake Forest	Columbia, SC	W 2-1	2,234	4-1-0
Wed., Sep. 26	#16 Davidson	Columbia, SC	W 4-1	1,329	5-1-0
Sun., Sep. 30	College of Charleston	Columbia, SC	W 2-0	2,828	6-1-0
Wed., Oct. 3	#3 Furman	Greenville, SC	W 3-2	2,612	7-1-0
Sun., Oct. 7	#14 Clemson	Clemson, SC	L 1-2	3,417	7-2-0
Mon., Oct. 15	Gardner-Webb	Columbia, SC	W 5-0	808	8-2-0
Fri., Oct. 19	Maryland	Columbia, SC	L 0-1	1,739	8-3-0
Sun., Oct. 21	#8 Rutgers	Columbia, SC	T 1-1	1,859	8-3-1
Fri., Oct. 26	CS Fullerton	Los Angeles, CA	W 2-0	492	9-3-1
Sun., Oct. 28	UCLA	Los Angeles, CA	T 0-0	950	9-3-2
Sun., Nov. 4	Drury	Columbia, SC	W 3-0	572	10-3-2
Fri., Nov 9	#7 North Carolina	Chapel Hill, NC	L 0-1	2,055	10-4-2
Sun., Nov 11	Elon	Columbia, SC	W 5-1	561	11-4-2
Sat., Nov. 17	FIU	Miami, FL	W 5-4	254	12-4-2
NCAA Tournament
Sun., Nov 25	UAB	Columbia, SC	L 2-3 (OT)	1,163	12-5-2

== See also ==
- South Carolina Gamecocks
