= Dave MacKenzie (soccer) =

Scottish-Canadian ice hockey player

Personal information
- Date of birth: March 10, 1956 (age 70)
- Place of birth: Inverness, Scotland
- Position: Defender

College career
Years	Team	Apps	(Gls)
1974–1977	Colgate Raiders		

Senior career*
Years	Team	Apps	(Gls)
1978–1980	Pittsburgh Spirit (indoor)	50	(14)
1980–1981	Hartford Hellions (indoor)	39	(12)
1981–1986	Pittsburgh Spirit (indoor)	218	(37)
1986–1988	Baltimore Blast (indoor)	103	(27)
1988–1989	Fort Wayne Flames (indoor)	27	(4)
1989	Pittsburgh Beadling		

International career
1974	Canada U-20	4	(0)
1979	Canadian Olympic	1	(0)

Managerial career
- 1988–1989: Fort Wayne Flames
- * Club domestic league appearances and goals

Dave MacKenzie is a retired Scottish-Canadian soccer defender who played professionally in the Major Indoor Soccer League.

== Professional ==
MacKenzie attended Colgate University where he played both hockey and soccer. He was inducted into the school's Athletic Hall of Fame. In 1978, he began his professional career with the Pittsburgh Spirit of the Major Indoor Soccer League. In 1980, he moved to the Hartford Hellions for one season before rejoining the Spirit in 1981. He remained with the Spirit until 1985 when he signed with the Baltimore Blast. In 1988, he was hired to coach the Fort Wayne Flames of the American Indoor Soccer Association. After his retirement from professional soccer in 1989, MacKenzie remained in the Pittsburgh area where he played for the amateur Pittsburgh Beadling.

== National team ==
In 1974, MacKenzie played four games for the Canadian U-20 soccer team. In 1974, he played one qualification game with the Canadian Olympic soccer team IN 1979.
