= Tony Annan =

English football manager

Personal information
- Place of birth: Newcastle upon Tyne, England

Team information
- Current team: South Carolina Gamecocks (head coach)

College career
Years	Team	Apps	(Gls)
–1998	Life Running Eagles		

Managerial career
- 2014–2015: United States Paralympic Team (assistant)
- 2015–2016: Atlanta Silverbacks (assistant)
- 2016–2021: Atlanta United (academy)
- 2020: Atlanta United 2 (interim)
- 2021–: South Carolina Gamecocks

Tony Annan is an English professional football head coach.

== Coaching career ==
Born in Newcastle upon Tyne, Annan moved to the United States and began coaching in the Atlanta, Georgia area. At one point he cofounded the Georgia United development academy. In December 2016, it was announced that Annan had joined new expansion Major League Soccer side Atlanta United as the club's academy director.

=== Atlanta United 2 ===
On 27 July 2020, it was announced that Annan would take over as interim head coach of Atlanta United 2, Atlanta United's reserve side which plays in the USL Championship. Annan was taking over from Stephen Glass, who was promoted to interim head coach of Atlanta United after Frank de Boer left the club.

His first match as head coach was on 29 July 2020 in the league against Miami. Atlanta United 2 won the match 4–3. From 29 July 2020 through 4 October 2020, Annan coached Atlanta United 2 to a record of 3 wins, 2 draws, and 7 losses.

On 18 December 2020, Gabriel Heinze replaced Stephen Glass as head coach of Atlanta United and Glass replaced Annan as head coach of Atlanta United 2.

On 23 March 2021, Annan took over as interim head coach of Atlanta United 2 a second time after Glass announced he was leaving the Atlanta United organization to become head coach of Aberdeen F.C. in the Scottish Premier League.

On 22 April 2021, Annan was named head coach of the men's soccer team at the University of South Carolina.

From 24 April 2021 through May 30, 2021, Annan coached Atlanta United 2 to a record of 2 wins, 2 draws, and 2 losses.

=== University of South Carolina ===
During his inaugural season in 2021, Annan coached South Carolina to a record of 5 wins, 2 draws, and 9 losses. In 2022, Annan coached South Carolina to a record of 5 wins, 4 draws, and 8 losses. In 2023, Annan coached South Carolina to a record of 6 wins, 3 draws, and 9 losses.

== Coaching statistics ==
As of the match played 8 November 2023

Team	Dates	Record W-D-L	Win%
Atlanta United 2	27 July 2020 - 4 October 2020	3-2-7	25.0%
Atlanta United 2	24 April 2021- 30 May 2021	2-2-2	33.3%
Total		5-4-9	27.8%
South Carolina	26 August 2021- 5 November 2021	5-2-9	31.3%
South Carolina	25 August 2022 - 6 November 2022	5-4-8	29.4%
South Carolina	24 August 2023 - 8 November 2023	6-3-9	33.3%
Total		16-9-26	31.4%
