= Jimmy McGeough Jr. =

Northern Irish footballer

Jim McGeough
Personal information
- Full name: James McGeough
- Place of birth: Northern Ireland
- Position: Defender

College career
Years	Team	Apps	(Gls)
1985	SUNY Farmingdale		

Senior career*
Years	Team	Apps	(Gls)
1985–1986	Columbus Capitals (indoor)		
1986–1987	Toledo Pride (indoor)		
1987–1988	Jacksonville Generals (indoor)		
1988–1989	Dayton Dynamo (indoor)		
1989–1990	Fort Lauderdale Strikers		
1990–1991	Wichita Wings (indoor)	30	(6)
1991	Miami Freedom		
1991	Albany Capitals	8	(0)
1992	San Diego Sockers (indoor)	5	(0)
1992–1993	Tampa Bay Rowdies	4	(0)
1994	Carolina Vipers (indoor)	24	(1)
1994–1996	Wichita Wings (indoor)	45	(13)
1995	Myrtle Beach Boyz	43	(13)
1996–1997	Philadelphia KiXX (indoor)	22	(5)
1997	Detroit Safari (indoor)		
1997–1998	Shelbourne F.C.		
1998	Detroit Safari (indoor)		

Managerial career
- 1994: Carolina Vipers (assistant)
- * Club domestic league appearances and goals

Jim McGeough is a retired Irish-American soccer defender. His career spanned over a dozen teams in seven leagues including the American Soccer League, American Professional Soccer League, Major Soccer League and National Professional Soccer League.

== Player ==
McGeough, son of Belfast-born footballer Jimmy McGeough, moved to the United States at the age of fourteen when his father was hired to coach the New York Apollo. He graduated from Hicksville Senior High School on Long Island, New York. He attended SUNY Farmingdale. In 1985, he signed with the Columbus Capitals in the American Indoor Soccer Association. In 1986, he moved to the Toledo Pride, but the team lasted only the 1986–1987 season before folding. McGeough then moved to the Jacksonville Generals for the 1987-1988 AISA season. He then joined the Dayton Dynamo in December 1988 and played one season there. He had a trial with Derby County F.C., but broke his clavicle and returned to the United States. In 1989, McGeough returned to outdoor soccer with the Fort Lauderdale Strikers in the third American Soccer League. That season the Strikers won the league championship which put them into national championship game pitting the ASL champs with the Western Soccer League champions. The Strikers won the game, 3–1, over the San Diego Nomads. McGeough was an ASL All Star. He continued with the Strikers in 1990. In August 1990, he signed with the Wichita Wings of the Major Indoor Soccer League for the 1990–1991 season. In 1991, he began the summer outdoor season with the Miami Freedom. When the Freedom failed to pay its players due to financial difficulties, McGeough moved to the Albany Capitals. The Capitals went to the APSL championship game where they fell in penalty kicks to the San Francisco Bay Blackhawks. In the fall of 1991, McGeough played four games with the Wings before going to England for a trial with Reading F.C. Personal issues led McGeough to return to the United States to be with his family. In January 1992, the San Diego Sockers of MISL signed him. Two injuries led to the loss of much of the early season, but he eventually played four regular season games for the Sockers. He scored the game winner in the Sockers 5-4 third game victory over the Dallas Sidekicks in the championship series. He then joined the Tampa Bay Rowdies of the APSL. He played the 1992 season as the Rowdies finished runner-up to the Colorado Foxes, and the 1993 season where the Rowdies lost in the play-off semi-finals. In 1994, he played for the Carolina Vipers in the Continental Indoor Soccer League which played a summer indoor season. That fall, he joined the Wichita Wings in the National Professional Soccer League. He spent two NPSL indoor winter seasons with the Wings. In 1995, he played the summer with the Myrtle Beach Boyz in the USISL where he lost to the Long Island Roughriders, coached by his father, in the championship game. In February 1996, the Dallas Burn selected McGeough in the 10th round (93rd overall) in the 1996 MLS Inaugural Player Draft. The Burn did not sign McGeough and he moved to the Philadelphia KiXX when the KiXX selected him in the NSPL Expansion Draft. He played one season with the KiXX, before moving to the Detroit Safari of the CISL for the 1997 summer indoor season. In the fall of 1997, he a trial with Shelbourne F.C. in the League of Ireland but chose to return to the United States after he was offered a contract. In 1998, he returned to the Safari where he finished his career.

== Coach ==
In 1994, McGeough served as an assistant coach with the Carolina Vipers. He coached youth soccer for several years, but no longer does so. In 2008, he coached a senior amateur team in Ireland.
