= Bob Willen =

Robert E. “Bob” Willen from Shoreham, New York is currently Kearney's managing partner and chairman. Previously, he was responsible for Kearney's Middle East and Africa region. Before that, he was responsible for their global Automotive, Aerospace & Defense, Transportation and Industrial practice.

== Early life and soccer career ==
Willen graduated from Shoreham-Wading River High School where he set a New York High School record for 39 career shutouts. He played collegiately with the University of Virginia from 1984 to 1987. In 1987, he was selected as a first team All American and the ISAA Goalkeeper of the Year. He graduated with a bachelor's degree in physics then gained a master's degree in aerospace engineering from the University of Texas at Austin. He returned to UVa to attend the Darden Graduate School of Business Administration and assist as a goalkeeper coach with the Cavaliers. He joined A.T. Kearney (now known as Kearney) in 1995. In 2003 he left the company to become a Vice President of EDS. In 2008, he returned to Kearney as Public Sector & Defense Services president.

== Professional work ==
Before joining Kearney, Bob worked at General Dynamics Space Systems, providing technical support for the Atlas family of space launch vehicles and various commercial business development activities. He joined Kearney in 1995 as a Management consultant. In 2001, after having been promoted to principal, Willen coauthored the book, with Johan C. Aurik, former chairman of Kearney, and Gillis J Jonk, a former partner. In 2008, Willen was named as one of the leaders of Kearney's Public Sector practice in the Americas, and then was named the leader of the global Automotive, Aerospace & Defense, Transportation and Industrial practice. He was appointed managing director for the Middle East in 2015, and then managing director for Middle East and Africa in 2018. In 2024 he became Kearney's managing partner.
