= Anton Nistl =

American soccer player

Personal information
- Full name: Anton Nistl
- Place of birth: Los Angeles, California, U.S.
- Height: 6 ft 1 in (1.85 m)
- Position: Goalkeeper

Youth career
- 1986–1989: UCLA

Senior career*
Years	Team	Apps	(Gls)
1987–1990	San Diego Nomads		
1988	California Kickers		
- * Club domestic league appearances and goals

Anton Nistl is a retired U.S. soccer goalkeeper. He was the 1989 ISAA Goalkeeper of the Year and spent three seasons in the Western Soccer Alliance and one in the American Professional Soccer League.

== College ==
Nistl attended UCLA where he played on the men's soccer team from 1986 to 1989. He was one in a long line of outstanding collegiate goalkeepers at UCLA that began with Tim Harris and David Vanole and continued with Brad Friedel, Kevin Hartman, Matt Reis, Nick Rimando and Zach Wells. Nistl's individual statistics put him at the top of this list. He holds school's records for career shutouts (41), victories (56) and single season GAA (.53 in both 1986 and 1989). Despite his outstanding individual efforts, Nistl did not win a championship even though his career was bracketed by title teams (UCLA won in 1985 and 1990). He was honored as a second team All American in 1989 as well as recognition as the ISAA Goalkeeper of the Year.

== Professional ==
Nistl spent his off seasons at UCLA playing in the Western Soccer Alliance. In 1987, he joined the San Diego Nomads. He led the WSA that season with a .81 GAA as the Nomads took the WSA championship based on points. In 1988, he played for both the California Kickers and Nomads. That year, he was the Nomad's goalkeeper in their semifinal loss to the San Jose Earthquakes. He continued to play for the Nomads in 1989 as the team won the championship yet again. However, Jeff Duback was in goal for both the WSA championship win over the San Francisco Bay Blackhawks and the subsequent loss to the Fort Lauderdale Strikers in the "National" professional championship. He played his last season of outdoor professional soccer in 1990, again with the Nomads.

He worked as a sales executive for Saucony Footwear and is currently the President of American Business for DC Shoes.
