= Richard Wurdack =

American soccer player

Personal information
- Date of birth: July 30, 1957 (age 69)
- Place of birth: St. Louis, Missouri, United States
- Positions: Defender; midfielder

Youth career
- 1976–1977: STLCC-Meramec
- 1978–1979: South Carolina Gamecocks

Senior career*
| Years | Team | Apps | (Gls) |
| 1980–1982 | Denver Avalanche (indoor) | 71 | (10) |
| 1982–1983 | Kansas City Comets (loan) | 0 | (0) |
- * Club domestic league appearances and goals

Richard Wurdack is a retired American soccer player who played professionally in the Major Indoor Soccer League.

Wurdack attended St. Louis Community College-Meramec. In 1976, the Meramec soccer team won the National Junior College champions and finished runner-up in 1977. In 1978, Wurdack transferred to the University of South Carolina which had just established soccer as a varsity sport. In 1980, Wurdack turned professional with the Denver Avalanche of the Major Indoor Soccer League. In 1982, he moved to the Kansas City Comets.
