= Toledo Pride =

American indoor soccer team

The Toledo Pride were an American indoor soccer team based in Toledo, Ohio. They played only one season (1986–1987) in the American Indoor Soccer Association. They qualified for the playoffs but lost in the first round. The Pride's average home attendances was 1,862.

== Year-by-year ==
Year	League	Games	Won	Lost	Pct	GF	GA	Regular season	Playoffs	Avg. attendance
1986–87	AISA	42	14	28	.333	179	210	3rd, Northern Div.	Quarterfinals (Chicago)	1,862 (21 games)

== Ownership ==
- (United States) Edward Cochran
- (United States) Robert Ransom
- (United States) John Glase
- (United States) Frank DeJulius
- (United States) Joshua Gotlieb

== Staff ==
- (United States) Edward Cochran – President
- (Netherlands) Klaas de Boer – Head coach / General manager
- (United States) Mike Garrett – Assistant coach
- (United States) Patrick Jennings – Flexibility coordinator

== Roster ==
- (United States) Cliff Brown
- (United States) Bob DiNunzio
- (United States) Mike Garrett
- (United States) Dave Masur
- (Northern Ireland) Jimmy McGeough, Jr.
- (United States) Ted Powers
- (United States) Neil Ridgway
- (Argentina) Carlos Salguero
- (United States) (Socialist Federal Republic of Yugoslavia) Lesh Shkreli
- (United States) Mark Jackson
- (Socialist Federal Republic of Yugoslavia) John Rudovic
- (United States) Juan Vega
- (United States) Miguel Garcia
- (United States) Dean Kelly

== History ==
The Toledo Pride were a One-Year Wonder indoor soccer outfit, playing in the Midwest-based American Indoor Soccer Association (AISA). The Pride played a winter schedule during 1986-87, filling empty dates at the Toledo Sports Arena after the city’s long-time minor league ice hockey club went out of business earlier in 1986.

The Pride finished their only season with a 14-28 record, but that was good enough to qualify for the playoffs under the AISA's generous format. The Chicago Shoccers eliminated the Pride in the first round.

The late Carlos Salguero was Toledo’s leading scorer with 45 goals and 23 assists. Salguero ranked 4th in the AISA in both goals and overall scoring.

The Pride endured an absolutely brutal season off the field. Original head coach/general manager Klaas de Boer either was fired or quit two months into the season. He later sued and obtained a judgement against the team's owners. de Boer’s replacement in the GM chair, John Durham, was arrested after two months on the job for grand theft and writing bad checks on team accounts midway. Durham later received a one-year prison term in June 1987. Two League AISA officials considered bumping the Pride from the league's playoff schedule due to the team’s insolvency, but the owners of the Toledo Sports Arena ultimately stepped up to guarantee the team’s expenses to finish out the season.3 The Toledo Pride folded quietly during the spring/early summer of 1987.
