= Billy Baumhoff =

American soccer player (born 1973)

Personal information
- Date of birth: February 7, 1973 (age 53)
- Place of birth: St. Louis, Missouri, U.S.
- Height: 5 ft 8 in (1.73 m)
- Position: Midfielder

College career
Years	Team	Apps	(Gls)
1991–1994	South Carolina Gamecocks		

Senior career*
Years	Team	Apps	(Gls)
1994–1995	St. Louis Knights		
1996	Kansas City Wiz	0	(0)
1996	→ Minnesota Thunder (loan)		
1997	Minnesota Thunder	10	(1)

International career
1989	United States U16		
- * Club domestic league appearances and goals

Billy Baumhoff (born February 7, 1973, in St. Louis, Missouri) is an American former professional soccer player who played as a midfielder. Baumhoff spent four seasons in the USISL and was a member of the Kansas City Wiz in 1996, but never entered a first team game. He was also a member of the United States U-16 men's national soccer team at the 1989 FIFA U-16 World Championship

He attended Christian Brothers College High School, graduating in 1991. In 1988, Baumhoff and his teammates won the Missouri State High School championship. He then attended the University of South Carolina, playing on the men's soccer team from 1991 to 1994. In 1993, the Gamecocks went to the NCAA championship game where they fell to the University of Virginia. In 1994 and 1995, he played for the St. Louis Knights in the USISL. In February 1996, the Kansas City Wiz selected Baumhoff in the 13th round (126th overall) of the 1996 MLS Inaugural Player Draft. On April 17, 1996, the Wiz placed him on the developmental roster. He spent part of the 1996 season on loan with the Minnesota Thunder in the USISL. The Wiz waived him on November 8, 1996 and on February 2, 1997, the Colorado Rapids picked him in the 2nd round (11th overall) of the 1997 MLS Supplemental Draft. The Rapids waived him on March 14, 1997, and on July 8, 1997, he signed with the Thunder for the remainder of the season.

He was a member of the United States U-16 men's national soccer team at the 1989 FIFA U-16 World Championship where he played one game, a 2–2 tie with Australia.

Baumhoff coaches the Christian Brothers College High School freshman soccer team leading them to an impressive 2024 season with only 2 losses throughout the season.
