= Clark Brisson =

American soccer player

Personal information
- Date of birth: February 9, 1969 (age 57)
- Place of birth: Raleigh, North Carolina, United States
- Height: 5 ft 10 in (1.78 m)
- Position: Forward

College career
Years	Team	Apps	(Gls)
1987–1990	South Carolina Gamecocks		

Senior career*
Years	Team	Apps	(Gls)
1991–1992	Canton Invaders (indoor)	39	(35)
1993	Charleston Battery	13	(4)
1993–1994	Baltimore Spirit (indoor)	39	(29)
1994–1995	Dayton Dynamo (indoor)	26	(28)
1996–1997	Philadelphia KiXX (indoor)	18	(11)
1999	Charleston Battery	21	(5)

Managerial career
- University of New Haven (assistant)
- 2008–: Charleston Battery (academy director)
- * Club domestic league appearances and goals

Clark Brisson (born February 9, 1969) is a retired U.S. soccer striker who is currently the executive director of the James Island Youth Soccer Club. He was a 1989 first team All American at the University of South Carolina and went on to play for nearly a decade in the National Professional Soccer League, USISL and USL A-League.

== Youth ==
Brisson attended Sanderson High School in Raleigh, North Carolina, graduating in 1987. In . Sanderson defeated Reynolds High School of Winston-Salem in the State 4A championship. He then attended the University of South Carolina, playing on the men's soccer team from 1987 to 1990. He finished his career ranked sixth all time on the school's career goals list with 36 and fifth all time on the assists list with 26. In 1989, he was selected as a first team All American. In 1991, he played on the U.S. soccer team at the World University Games.

== Professional ==
On October 15, 1991, Brisson signed with the Canton Invaders of the |National Professional Soccer League who had selected him in the second round of the 1991 NPSL draft. He was the team's second leading scorer, but left the team at the end of the 1991–1992 season. In 1993, Brisson was the first player signed by the expansion Charleston Battery of the USISL. In October 1993, he moved to the Baltimore Spirit of the NPSL for the 1993–1994 season. He then moved to the Dayton Dynamo for the 1994–1995 season. In 1996, he signed with the Philadelphia KiXX for the 1996–1997 season. In 1999, Brisson was back with the Battery, this time playing in the USL A-League.

== Coach ==
At some point in his career, Brisson served as an assistant coach with the University of New Haven women's soccer team. However, he has spent most of his coaching career with youth clubs in South Carolina. From 2000 to 2003, he was the director of City Soccer in Charleston. He also served as the Director of Coaching in the Summerville Soccer Club until 2007. That year, he founded Bridge Futbal Alliance, which eventually evolved into the South Carolina United Battery Academy under the direction of the Battery professional club.
