= Bob Ramsey (soccer) =

American soccer player and coach

Personal information
- Date of birth: October 23, 1957 (age 69)
- Place of birth: Seattle, Washington, U.S.
- Height: 5 ft 8 in (1.73 m)
- Positions: Defender; midfielder

Youth career
- 1976–1977: Washington Huskies

Senior career*
Years	Team	Apps	(Gls)
1981–1984	Pittsburgh Spirit (indoor)	47	(5)
1983	Pennsylvania Stoners		
1984–1985	Louisville Thunder (indoor)		
1986–1987	Fort Wayne Flames (indoor)	21	(6)

Managerial career
- 1986–1987: Fort Wayne Flames (assistant)
- * Club domestic league appearances and goals

Bob Ramsey is an American retired soccer player. He spent time in the American Soccer League, Major Indoor Soccer League and American Indoor Soccer Association.

Ramsey attended the University of Washington, playing on the men's soccer team in 1976 and 1977. In 1981, he signed with the Pittsburgh Spirit of the Major Indoor Soccer League where he played for three seasons. In 1983, he played the summer with the Pennsylvania Stoners of the American Soccer League. In 1984, he joined the Louisville Thunder of the American Indoor Soccer Association. He also played one season (1986–1987) with the Fort Wayne Flames where he also served as an assistant coach.
