= Paul DiBernardo =

Argentine-American soccer player and coach

Personal information
- Place of birth: Argentina
- Position: Midfielder

College career
Years	Team	Apps	(Gls)
1981–1984	Indiana University		

Senior career*
Years	Team	Apps	(Gls)
1985	Louisville Thunder (indoor)	22	(18)
1985–1986	Chicago Shoccers (indoor)		
1986–1988	Fort Wayne Flames (indoor)	83	(50)

International career
1985	United States	1	(0)
- * Club domestic league appearances and goals

Paul DiBernardo is a retired soccer midfielder who coaches youth soccer. Born in Argentina, he played professionally in the American Indoor Soccer Association and earned one cap with the United States men's national soccer team.

== Youth ==
DiBernardo, a native of Argentina, emigrated to the United States in 1972 with his family. He grew up in Illinois and attended Riverside High School in North Riverside, Illinois. He graduated in 1981, after which he attended Indiana University. While growing up, he also played for Sparta Soccer Club in Chicago. After high school, played as a midfielder on the Hoosiers soccer team from 1981 to 1984. His older brother Angelo had been a star at Indiana in the late 1970s. During Paul's four seasons with the Hoosiers, they went to the championship game three years running, taking the title in 1982 and 1983 and losing to Clemson in 1984. DiBernardo contributed 40 goals and 36 assists during his four years and was named the 1984 SoccerAmerica college Player of the Year. In 1997, the Indiana Soccer Hall of Fame inducted DiBernardo.

== Professional ==
In January 1985, DiBernardo signed with the Louisville Thunder of the American Indoor Soccer Association (AISA) for the remainder of the 1984–1985 season. In June 1985, the Minnesota Strikers selected DiBernardo in the first round (eighth overall) of the Major Indoor Soccer League draft. The Strikers released him during the pre-season. He then signed with the Chicago Shoccers of the AISA. He spent one season with the Shoccers then moved to the Fort Wayne Flames in 1986. DiBernardo appeared in 95 games for the Flames from 1986 to 1989. During the 1987-1988 AISA season, he scored 18 goals for the Fort Wayne Flames, putting him 10th on the league's points list.

=== Fort Wayne Flames ===
==== Regular season ====
- Games Played - 83
- Goals - 50*
- Assists - 27
- Points - 77*
- Shots on Goal - 305*
- Blocked Shots - 55
- Fouls - 143
- Penalty Minutes - 33*

(* = career franchise leader)

==== Playoffs ====
- Games Played - 12*
- Goals - 7
- Assists - 8*
- Points - 15
- Shots on Goal - 45
- Blocked Shots - 2
- Fouls - 20
- Penalty Minutes - 4

(* = career franchise leader)

== National team ==
DiBernardo earned one cap with the U.S. national team when he came on for Jacques LaDouceur in a February 8, 1985 tie with Switzerland.

== Coach ==
He is a staff coach for the Naperville Soccer Club of Naperville, Illinois.
