= Chris Snitko =

American soccer player

Personal information
- Full name: Chris Snitko
- Date of birth: January 24, 1973 (age 53)
- Place of birth: Hackensack, New Jersey, United States
- Height: 6 ft 3 in (1.91 m)
- Position: Goalkeeper

College career
Years	Team	Apps	(Gls)
1992–1995	UCLA Bruins		

Senior career*
Years	Team	Apps	(Gls)
1996–2000	Kansas City Wizards	26	(0)
2000	Chicago Fire	5	(0)
2001	Dallas Burn	1	(0)

International career
1996	United States U23	5	(0)
- * Club domestic league appearances and goals

Chris Snitko (born January 24, 1973), is a retired U.S. soccer goalkeeper who was the 1995 ISAA Goalkeeper of the Year. He then spent six seasons in Major League Soccer and earned five caps with the United States U-23 men's national soccer team.

== Youth ==
Snitko, though born in Hackensack, New Jersey, grew up in Anaheim, California. He attended Canyon High School where he played on both the soccer and baseball teams. While in high school, Snitko also trained with the UCLA men's soccer team during his spare time. He also spent two years with the local youth club, North Huntington Beach Futbol Club where his team, the Untouchables took the 1990 state title. After graduating from high school, Snitko attended UCLA where he played on the men's soccer team. In 1992, he sat as Brad Friedel manned the Bruins' nets. However, in 1993, Snitko became the starting goalkeeper for UCLA, a position he held for the next three seasons. He gained his greatest success as a senior when he was selected as a first team All American and the ISAA Goalkeeper of the Year. His 31 career shutouts and 47 career victories are both second on the team's respective lists.

== National team ==
In 1996, the Kansas City Wizards of Major League Soccer (MLS) selected Snitko in the first round (fifth overall) of the 1996 MLS College Draft. That year he did not play with the Wizards as the team allowed Snitko to train and play full-time with the U.S. U-23 team as it prepared for the 1996 Summer Olympics in Atlanta, Georgia. While Snitko made the U.S. Olympic team, he did not start in the tournament because the team also boasted Kasey Keller as it starting goalkeeper. However, Snitko did earn 5 junior national team caps with the U-23 team.

== Professional ==
In 1997, Snitko rejoined the Wizards full-time. Once again, he found himself behind a great keeper, this time Mike Ammann. That season Amman set a league record for 21 wins. Snitko saw time in only five games that year. When the Wizards traded Amman in 1999, it did Snitko no favors as the team picked up Tony Meola. After only a few games of the 2000 season, the Wizards traded Snitko to the Chicago Fire for two draft picks. Snitko promptly started for the Fire, earning a shutout in his first game with his new team. However, he ended the season up with only five appearances with the Fire and was traded to the Dallas Burn on March 21, 2001, for a third round draft pick in the 2003 College Draft. On June 27, 2001, an error on Snitko's part resulted in a goal for the Seattle Sounders in the second round of the 2001 Open Cup. Soon after he suffered an injury to his ankle and he only played in one game that season. He retired from playing professionally at the end of the 2001 season.

In 2003, the Chicago Fire hired Snitko as a goalkeeper coach for their farm system.

He is currently an architectural photographer in Orange County, California.
