= Charles Arndt =

American soccer player (born 1967)

Charlie Arndt
Personal information
- Full name: Charles Arndt
- Date of birth: c. 1967 (age 58–59)
- Place of birth: Silver Spring, Maryland, U.S.
- Position: Goalkeeper

College career
Years	Team	Apps	(Gls)
1985–1988	South Carolina Gamecocks		

Senior career*
Years	Team	Apps	(Gls)
1990–1991	Maryland Bays		

Managerial career
- 1995–: Furman Paladins (assistant)
- * Club domestic league appearances and goals

Charles "Charlie" Arndt (born c. 1967) is an American soccer goalkeeping coach and former professional player who is the goalkeeping coach of the Furman Paladins.

Arndt was a prolific goalkeeper for the South Carolina Gamecocks and was named the 1988 ISAA Goalkeeper of the Year. After college, he spent two seasons in the American Professional Soccer League playing for the Maryland Bays.

== Playing career ==
Arndt graduated from John F. Kennedy High School in Silver Spring, Maryland. He then attended the University of South Carolina where he was a member of the men's soccer team from 1985 to 1988. In 1985, he served as the backup to Warren Lipka. From 1987 to 1988, Arndt earned a career 0.70 GAA. In 1988, his senior year, the University of South Carolina made it to the NCAA Final Four, only to fall to Howard University in the semifinal. He ended his Gamecocks career with 13 career shutouts, tied with Lipka. In 1988, he was named the ISAA Goalkeeper of the Year and second team All-American. While Arndt finished his soccer career at South Carolina in 1988, he did not complete his degree requirements until 1990 when he graduated with a bachelor's degree in finance. In 2023, USC retired his number 1 jersey.

In July 1989, the Cleveland Crunch of Major Indoor Soccer League selected Arndt in the MISL Amateur Draft. There are not indications of whether or not he spent any time with the Crunch. He played the 1990 and 1991 seasons for the Maryland Bays in the American Professional Soccer League. At some point, he attempted to break into professional soccer in Germany, but after one season he returned to the United States.

== Coaching career ==
In 1995, Furman University hired Arndt's former South Carolina team mate, Doug Allison. Allison turned around and immediately hired Arndt as the Furman University goalkeeper coach. Arndt has remained in that position to today. He is also on the staff of Doug Allison's Soccer Academy.

Arndt also spent time as the U.S. U-17 goalkeeper coach.

He is a vice president with RBC Centura Bank.
