= Cliff Brown (soccer) =

American soccer player and coach (born 1956)

Personal information
- Date of birth: May 23, 1956 (age 70)
- Place of birth: Valdosta, Georgia, U.S.
- Height: 5 ft 11 in (1.80 m)
- Position: Goalkeeper

Youth career
- 1974–1977: Washington Huskies

Senior career*
Years	Team	Apps	(Gls)
1978–1979	Seattle Sounders	6	(0)
1979–1981	Cleveland Force (indoor)	61	(0)
1981–1983	Wichita Wings (indoor)	12	(0)
1983	Tacoma Stars (indoor)	4	(0)
1983–1984	Kansas City Comets (indoor)	4	(0)
1987	Toledo Pride (indoor)		
1989–1992	Wichita Blue		
1991	Wichita Wings (indoor)	4	(0)
1992	Tulsa Ambush (indoor)	12	(0)
1992–1993	Denver Thunder (indoor)	2	(0)
1993	Oklahoma City Slickers	16	(0)
1994	Wichita Blue		
1996–1997	Tampa Bay Terror (indoor)	5	(0)
2001–2003	Wichita Warriors (indoor)		

Managerial career
- 1978–1979: Washington Huskies (assistant)
- 1986: Fort Wayne Flames
- 1987: Toledo Pride
- 1988– 2023: Newman Jets
- 1998: Shreveport/Bossier Lions
- * Club domestic league appearances and goals

Cliff Brown (born May 23, 1956) is an American former soccer goalkeeper who is the former head coach of the Newman University soccer team. Brown played in the North American Soccer League, Major Indoor Soccer League, National Professional Soccer League, Lone Star Soccer Alliance and USISL. He also coached professionally as well as collegiately.

== Player ==
While born in Georgia, Brown grew up in Tacoma, Washington. He attended the University of Washington where he played on the men's soccer team from 1974 to 1977.

In 1978, the Seattle Sounders of the North American Soccer League selected Brown in the third round of the College Draft. He spent most of his two seasons in Seattle with the reserve team, but saw time in six games. In 1979, he signed with the Cleveland Force in the Major Indoor Soccer League. He played 28 games during the 1979–1980 season and another 33 games during the 1980–1981 season. In 1981, he moved to the Wichita Wings. In 1983, he returned to the Pacific Northwest to play for the Tacoma Stars. He was then traded to the Kansas City Comets during the season. In 1986, he signed as a player-coach with the expansion Toledo Pride in the American Indoor Soccer Association after being fired by the Fort Wayne Fever in December 1986. The Pride lasted only until the end of the season before folding. In 1988, was hired as the head coach of Newman University, a position he still holds. Consequently, over the next six years, he tended to play intermittently during the collegiate offseason. In 1989, Brown moved to the Wichita Blue which played in the amateur Heartland Soccer League. In 1990, the team moved to the Lone Star Soccer Alliance and remained in that league until it collapsed following the 1992 season. In February 1991, Brown signed a 15-day contract with Wichita Wings after all of the team's goalkeepers were injured. He played four games for a 2–2 record. In February 1992, he signed a one-game contract with the Tulsa Ambush of the National Professional Soccer League, but ended up playing twelve games. During the 1992–1993 NPSL season, he played two games as a fill-in goalkeeper with the Denver Thunder. In April 1993, he played for the Oklahoma City Slickers in the USISL then returned to the Wichita Blues for the 1994 USISL season. He continued to fill in with NPSL teams during the 1996–1997 season when he played five games for the Tampa Bay Terror. In 2001, he joined the Wichita Warriors, a semi-pro indoor team.

== Coach ==
Brown gained his first coaching experience while still a player at the University of Washington. In 1978 and 1979, he was an assistant with the team. In 1986, Brown was hired by the Fort Wayne Flames of the American Indoor Soccer Association. The team fired him in December 1986 after he compiled a 2–3 record to start the season. He was then hired as a player-coach by the Toledo Pride where he finished the 1986–1987 season. In 1998, he coached the Shreveport/Bossier Lions in the USISL. He entered his coaching position at Newman University in 1988 when he became the fourth head coach for the men's soccer team. In 1989, he established the school's women's soccer team.

Brown earned his Bachelor of Science degree in business from Newman in 1991.

He was released from his position as head coach of Newman soccer in February 2023.
