= Warren Lipka =

American soccer player (born 1964)

Personal information
- Full name: Warren Lipka
- Date of birth: September 10, 1964 (age 62)
- Place of birth: St. Louis, Missouri, U.S.
- Position: Goalkeeper

College career
Years	Team	Apps	(Gls)
1982–1985	South Carolina		

Senior career*
Years	Team	Apps	(Gls)
1986–1989	Fort Wayne Flames (indoor)	60	(0)
1989–1990	Indiana Kick (indoor)		
1990–1991	Detroit Rockers (indoor)		

Managerial career
- 1987–1990: Bishop Dwenger High School (assistant)
- 1989: Tri-State University women
- 1989–1991: Indiana Kick
- 1991: Kentucky men (assistant)
- 1992–2008: Kentucky women
- 2003: U.S. U-19 women (assistant)
- 2003–2004: U.S. U-21 women (assistant)
- 2009–2021: Morehead State women
- * Club domestic league appearances and goals as of 22:43, 23 March 2007 (UTC) ‡ National team caps and goals as of 27 June 2006

Warren Lipka is an American retired soccer goalkeeper who formerly coached the University of Kentucky and Morehead State University women's soccer teams.

== Youth and college ==
Lipka attended Lindbergh High School. After graduation, he attended the University of South Carolina where he played as a goalkeeper on the men's soccer team. He spent his first two seasons as a backup to Glen Thompson. Once he earned the starting spot in 1984, he rewarded his team with a .36 GAA. He followed that in 1985 with a .75 GAA as South Carolina went to the third round of the NCAA tournament where it lost to Davidson. That year he was named the ISAA Goalkeeper of the Year. He finished his career at South Carolina with 13 shutouts, tied with Charles Arndt, for the Gamecocks’ record. He graduated from South Carolina in 1986 with a bachelor's degree in hotel and restaurant management.

== Playing career ==
Lipka joined the Fort Wayne Flames of the American Indoor Soccer Association (AISA) in 1986. He played with the Flames through the 1988–1989 season, earning team MVP recognition in 1987 and 1988. In June 1989, the Indiana Kick hired Lipka as the team's head coach. He would spend the year both on the bench and in the nets as a player-coach. The Kick collapsed at the end of the season and in July 1990, the Atlanta Attack selected Lipka in the dispersal draft. He also spent time in trials with the San Diego Sockers before signing with the Detroit Rockers of the NPSL in November 1990. He was an NPSL All Star that season.

== Coaching ==
Lipka began his coaching career while playing for the Flames. In 1987, he joined Bishop Dwenger High School as the boys' soccer team assistant coach. He stayed with the team until 1990. In 1989, he served as the head coach of the Tri-State University women's soccer team. That year he also became the general manager and head coach of the indoor soccer Indiana Kick of the National Professional Soccer League (NPSL).

In 1991, the University of Kentucky hired Lipka as its men's soccer team assistant coach. The next season, the university hired him as the women's soccer team head coach, the first women's soccer coach in the school's history. He was the SEC coach of the year in 1995, 1999 and 2006.

In 2003, United States Soccer Federation hired Lipka as the goalkeeper coach of the U.S. U-19 women's national team, a position he held through 2003 and 2004. In 2004, the U-19 team took third place at the U-19 World Cup. In 2004, he also served as the goalkeeper coach for the U.S. U-21 women's national team at the Nordic Cup, which the U.S. won for the fifth consecutive time.

He has also coached various Olympic Development Program teams as well as youth soccer clubs and camps.

Lipka served as the head coach for the Morehead State Eagles women's soccer team from 2009 to 2021. Lipka finished his tenure there with an 88–130–29 record and won OVC Tournament Championships.
