= Jen Mead =

American soccer player (born 1972)

Personal information
- Full name: Jennifer Kim Mead
- Date of birth: June 13, 1972 (age 54)
- Place of birth: Norwood, Massachusetts, U.S.
- Height: 5 ft 10 in (1.78 m)
- Position: Goalkeeper

Youth career
- –1990: Bridgewater-Raynham Trojans

College career
Years	Team	Apps	(Gls)
1991–1993	Providence Friars		
1994	George Mason Patriots		

Senior career*
Years	Team	Apps	(Gls)
1996–1998	Boston Renegades		
2001	Bay Area CyberRays	1	(0)

International career
- United States U17
1993–1997	United States	6	(0)

Managerial career
- Colorado College Tigers (assistant)
- Rutgers Scarlet Knights (assistant)
- 1997–199?: Newton North Tigers
- 2000: Louisville Cardinals (assistant)
- 2001: Boston College Eagles (assistant)
- Walpole Rebels
- * Club domestic league appearances and goals

Jennifer Kim Mead (born June 13, 1972) is an American former soccer player who played as a goalkeeper, making six appearances for the United States women's national team. She also played basketball during her collegiate career.

== Soccer career ==
Mead played for the Bridgewater-Raynham Trojans soccer team in high school, where she was a league MVP and named to the All-American, All-New England, and All-State selections. In college, she played for the Providence Friars from 1991 to 1993, having not participated in her freshman season as she was preoccupied with basketball, the main focus of her athletic scholarship to attend the school. She helped the team win the 1993 Big East championship, where she was named the Most Outstanding Player of the Tournament. She was named in the All-New England selection while playing for the Friars, and was a second-team All-American. While at Providence, she also set a school record for fewest goals allowed in a season (12) in 1991.

In 1993, Mead was awarded the Honda Inspiration Award, which is given to a collegiate athlete "who has overcome hardship and was able to return to play at the collegiate level". She overcame a heart issue requiring open-heart surgery, and rebounded to become an All-American soccer player.

After graduating from Providence, she went to play for the George Mason Patriots during the 1994 season. That season she was a Soccer America First-Team All-American, an All-Region selection, was named the ISAA Goalkeeper of the Year, and was included in the All-CAA selection. With her season at George Mason, she set a school record for the best save percentage (.904) in a career or a season, the fewest goals against average (0.54) in a career or a season, and the most shutouts (10) in a season.

Mead appeared for U.S. under-17 national team. She made her international debut for the United States on June 21, 1993, in a friendly match against Canada. In total, she made six appearances for the U.S., earning her final cap on December 13, 1997, in a friendly match against Brazil.

In club soccer, Mead played for the Boston Renegades. In 2001, she joined the Bay Area CyberRays for the inaugural WUSA season, though a knee injury only allowed her to make one appearance during the season. She retired from her playing career at the end of the season.

Mead later began coaching, working as an assistant for the Colorado College Tigers, Rutgers Scarlet Knights, Louisville Cardinals, and Boston College Eagles. She also worked as the head coach of the Newton North Tigers and Walpole Rebels high school girls' teams.

== Basketball career ==
Mead played as a center in basketball. She played for the Bridgewater-Raynham Trojans in high school, with The Boston Globe selecting her as one of the top twelve high school basketball players as a junior. As a senior she helped the school win the state championship, and was named in the All-Scholastic team and the State Basketball Player of the Year by The Boston Globe. In college, she played for the Providence Friars from 1990 to 1993. She was included in the Big East All-Freshman Team in 1991.

=== Career statistics ===
Legend
GP	Games played	GS	Games started	MPG	Minutes per game	RPG	Rebounds per game
APG	Assists per game	SPG	Steals per game	BPG	Blocks per game	PPG	Points per game
TO	Turnovers per game	FG%	Field-goal percentage	3P%	3-point field-goal percentage	FT%	Free-throw percentage
**Bold**	Career best	°	League leader

==== College ====
Year	Team	GP	GS	MPG	FG%	3P%	FT%	RPG	APG	SPG	BPG	TO	PPG
1990–91	Providence	**32**	-	-	44.6	0.0	60.6	5.8	1.3	0.9	0.1	-	9.3
1991–92	Providence	12	-	-	**54.0**	0.0	74.2	**8.9**	**2.3**	**1.5**	0.3	-	**19.7**
1992–93	Providence	28	-	-	38.8	**30.0**	54.7	7.4	1.6	1.1	0.2	-	10.1
1993–94	Providence	2	-	-	47.4	0.0	**75.0**	6.5	0.5	**1.5**	**0.5**	-	12.0
**Career**		74	-	-	44.5	26.3	63.4	7.0	1.5	1.1	0.2	-	11.4
Statistics retrieved from Sports-Reference.

== Personal life ==
Mead was born in Norwood, Massachusetts, but grew up in Raynham. She attended Bridgewater-Raynham Regional High School, where she also played softball. She graduated from Providence College. Mead received a master's degree in exercise science from Springfield College, where she also taught and later earned a doctorate. She currently works as an associate professor at Bridgewater State University. She resides in Fairhaven with her wife and two children.

== Career statistics ==
=== International ===
United States
Year	Apps	Goals
1993	2	0
1994	1	0
1997	3	0
Total	6	0
