= Paul Turin =

American soccer player

Personal information
- Date of birth: November 18, 1957 (age 68)
- Place of birth: St. Louis, Missouri, United States
- Height: 5 ft 11 in (1.80 m)
- Position: Goalkeeper

Youth career
- 1975: Christian Brothers

College career
Years	Team	Apps	(Gls)
1976–1977	St. Louis Community College-Meramec		
1978–1979	South Carolina Gamecocks		

Senior career*
Years	Team	Apps	(Gls)
1979–1980	St. Louis Steamers (indoor)	18	(0)
1979–1980	Tulsa Roughnecks	9	(0)
1980–1981	Tulsa Roughnecks (indoor)	6	(0)
- * Club domestic league appearances and goals

Paul Turin is a retired U.S. soccer goalkeeper who played professionally in the Major Indoor Soccer League and North American Soccer League.

== Youth ==
Turin graduated from Christian Brothers College High School. He then began his collegiate career with St. Louis Community College-Meramec where he was a 1976 First Team and 1977 Honorable Mention (third team) National Junior College Athletic Association All American soccer player. In 1978, he was one of six players from STLCC-Meramec who transferred to the University of South Carolina. He played the 1978 and 1979 college soccer seasons with the Gamecocks. He has the third lowest goals against average in Gamecocks history.

== Professional ==
In 1979, he signed with the St. Louis Steamers of the Major Indoor Soccer League. He played eighteen games and had the fourth lowest goals against average that season. In December 1979, the Tulsa Roughnecks of the North American Soccer League selected Turin with the first pick of the second round of the 1979 draft. He played the 1980 outdoor and 1980–1981 indoor seasons with the Roughnecks.
