= Fort Wayne Flames =

American indoor soccer club

The Fort Wayne Flames were an indoor soccer club based in Fort Wayne, Indiana, that competed in the American Indoor Soccer Association, playing home games at the Allen County War Memorial Coliseum from 1986 to 1989. In 2026 Summit City Sentinels rebranded back to the Fort Wayne Flames for 2026-27 Major League Indoor Soccer

== History ==
The team was founded in by a group of four investors: Bob Britt, Fred Mathews Jr., James Speed, and William Fahlsing and began play in the 1986–87 season of the American Indoor Soccer Association (AISA). The team reached out to experience by hiring away Pete Mahlock from the Louisville Thunder to be the team General Manager. Former Seattle Sounders (NASL), Cleveland Force (MISL), & Wichita Wings (MISL) goalkeeper and University of Washington coach Cliff Brown was brought in to be the first head coach of the franchise.

The inaugural season was one of struggle for the fledgling team. Just five games into the season, Brown was fired and replaced by defenseman Tom Alioto who continued his on field duties as a player/coach. As the team struggled on field, finishing last in the Southern Division with a 13–29 record, it also struggled off field. Despite finishing the season with the fourth-best attendance in the league, the season ended with the franchise having racked up huge losses that left the future in jeopardy.

The franchise returned for the 1987–88 season as remaining investors Mathews and Speed were joined by local businessman Craig Hartman, who with a huge influx of his own money, assumed the role as team President. Retaining Mahlock as GM, the team hired former three-time Indiana University All-American, 1978 Hermann Trophy winner, NASL player, and United States Olympian Angelo DiBernardo to become the third Head Coach of the franchise. Although the on field play improved under new leadership, the team suffered and incredible 10 one-goal losses (the rest of the league had 13 one-goal losses combined) en route to a 9–15 record and a last-place finish in the regular season.

Abandoning a traditional playoff format, the AISA instituted a six-team, home-and-away, round robin “Challenge Cup” Series to crown the 1988 post-season champion. Living up the promise they showed in the regular season, the Flames became dominant during the Cup Series, outscoring their opponents 67–46 through the first 11 games and posting an 8–3 record. The final game of the “Challenge Cup” was scheduled for April 1, 1988, with the Flames playing host to the 1984–85 and 1985–86 AISA Champion Canton Invaders. With each team hosting an 8–3 record, the game would be winner-take-all for the Cup. In front of a sellout (and franchise record) crowd of 8,028, the Flames would fall behind early and stage a furious rally late, only to fall to the Invaders 5–4.

Despite gains in the regular season attendance and league-leading playoff attendance, the 1988 off-season was again troublesome for the franchise. Looking to stem the flow of red ink, Hartman restructured the Flames into the only registered not-for-profit sports franchise in the nation. The off-season saw an intense fund-raising operation that included GM Mahlock and players Alan Bodenstein and Bobby Poursanidis living atop a billboard in the heart of downtown to raise both team awareness and funding. The results were impressive as hundreds of fans purchased stock in the team and 27 prominent local business leaders invested in the team to make up the new board of directors.

When DiBernardo decided to leave coaching, the team turned to former MISL standout defenseman Dave MacKenzie to be the fourth Head Coach of the franchise. Entering the position as the (then) all-time leader in MISL games played and with a reputation as a hard-nosed, physical player, the team showed marked improvement under MacKenzie, but continued to struggle in close games. Looking to add some extra spark, MacKenzie became the second player/coach of the franchise as he activated himself and played in 27 games. Despite improving to a .500 record (20–20) the team missed the playoffs by one game.

The team folded following the 1989 season. Under separate ownership, Fort Wayne was awarded an expansion franchise Indiana Kick, which lasted one additional season (1989–1990).

Fort Wayne Summit City Sentinels rebranded to the Fort Wayne Flames for the 2026-27 Major League Indoor Soccer

== Year-by-year ==
Year	GP	W	L	%	GB	GF	GA	ATT	AVE	PLAYOFFS
1986–87	42	13	29	.325	14	157	218	47,647	2,269	Did not qualify
1987–88	24	9	15	.375	7	99	112	29,521	2,460	N/A
1988 (Chall. Cup)	12	8	4	.667	1	71	51	25,307	4,218	Challenge Cup runner-up
1988–89	40	20	20	.500	5	337	299	74,840	3,742	Did not qualify
2024-25	12	4	8	.333	7	62	132	6,000	1,000	Did Not Qualify
2025-26	12	0	12	.000	11	69	132	6,000	1,000	Did Not Qualify

== Head coaches ==
FORT WAYNE FLAMES HEAD COACHES
NAME	SEASON	RECORD
Cliff Brown	1986–87	2–3
Tom Alioto	1986–87 (5 games into 1986–87 season)	11–26
Angelo DiBernardo	1987–88	9–15
Angelo DiBernardo	1988 Challenge Cup	8–4
Dave MacKenzie	1988–89	20–20

== Players statistics (regular season) ==
FORT WAYNE FLAMES PLAYERS (regular season)
NAME	SEASONS	GAMES	GOALS *	ASSIST	POINTS *	SHOTS	BLOCKS	FOULS	PIM
Tom Alioto	1986–87	42	9	15	24	92	51	54	6
Ricardo Alonso	1988–89	19	13	12	25	88	14	54	4
Lenny Armuth	1986–87	22	4	2	6	17	19	32	10
Todd Barrett	1986–87	13	1	1	2	21	12	32	12
Ron Basile	1986–87	22	12	9	21	83	3	50	10
Bill Becher	1987–89	32	6	3	9	34	7	40	1
Steve Boardman	1988–89	21	2	3	5	12	16	26	1
Alan Bodenstein	1986–89	103	23	25	48	210	117	147	32
David Caetano	1987–88	9	0	0	0	8	2	5	0
Paul DiBernardo	1986–89	83	50	27	77	305	55	143	33
Dean Duerst	1986–87	14	2	0	2	21	9	13	6
Mike Farmer	1988–89	8	1	0	1	2	0	5	0
Horst Fleps	1986–87	7	0	1	1	7	2	1	0
Kevin Flynn	1986–87	7	0	1	1	18	12	10	4
Peter Forde	1986–87	5	0	2	2	13	3	10	0
Chance Fry	1986–87	18	7	5	12	32	14	45	8
Keith Fulk	1987–89	39	11	9	20	88	48	65	12
Frank Gallo	1986–87	2	0	0	0	0	0	0	0
Jon Gardner	1988–89	8	0	0	0	1	2	5	0
Oscar Gomez	1987–88	5	0	1	1	1	1	5	0
Manuel Gorrity	1986–88	35	6	4	10	45	25	60	16
Chris Hellenkamp	1987–89	62	30	33	63	206	46	68	8
Jamie Hutchins	1986–87	4	1	0	1	2	2	7	0
Peter Jecker	1988–89	26	7	4	11	34	19	30	3
Larry Julius	1987–88	16	2	7	9	52	17	27	8
Paul Kato	1987–88	8	2	1	3	21	26	22	4
Ken Killingsworth	1986–88	49	27	27	54	136	23	62	10
Kris Klassen	1986–87	3	0	0	0	0	0	1	
Tim Larkin	1988–89	19	4	3	7	19	16	23	2
Warren Lipka	1986–89	60	0	4	4	4	1	9	21
Keith Loeffler	1986–87	5	1	2	3	12	2	6	4
Mark Lugris	1986–87	42	11	22	33	129	37	64	6
Dave MacKenzie	1988–89	27	4	5	9	22	11	17	3
Tom Mollerup	1986–87	36	3	5	8	35	25	35	2
Jorge Montoya	1987–89	50	6	9	15	54	83	125	8
Mike Noonan	1986–88	37	2	5	7	19	74	65	8
Dan O’Keefe	1986–88	65	49	18	67	257	9	70	2
Otto Orf	1986–89	59	1	7	8	8	0	12	26
Carlos Pena	1988–89	1	0	0	0	0	0	0	0
Bronn Pfeiffer	1987–89	36	1	3	4	33	27	30	4
Bob Poursanidis	1986–89	104	28	20	48	208	58	114	11
Randy Prescott	1987–89	60	15	13	28	152	111	93	12
Ed Puskarich	1986–87	17	2	0	2	8	18	21	2
Bob Ramsey	1986–87	21	6	8	14	68	6	42	4
Neil Ridgway	1987–89	62	46	21	67	169	39	80	9
Martin Rincon	1987–89	14	3	3	6	34	28	26	8
Rob Ryerson	1988–89	26	6	5	11	28	6	40	2
Carlos Salguero	1987–89	60	35	25	60	290	28	109	12
Joe Schmid	1986–87	7	0	1	1	1	11	7	2
Todd Smith	1988–89	39	4	8	12	33	39	91	9
Mike Sotello	1987–88	4	0	1	1	0	1	1	0
Bill Stallings	1986–87	10	1	0	1	9	3	9	2
Chris Tolken	1986–87	2	0	0	0	0	0	0	0
Graham West	1986–87	1	0	0	0	0	0	0	0

== Players statistics (playoffs) ==
FORT WAYNE FLAMES PLAYERS (1988 Challenge Cup)
NAME	GAMES	GOALS *	ASSIST	POINTS *	SHOTS	BLOCKS	FOULS	PIM
Bill Becher	11	4	1	5	7	4	7	0
Bruce Bellenger	7	0	0	0	6	0	4	2
Alan Bodenstein	12	1	4	5	18	14	19	4
David Caetano	2	1	0	1	5	0	2	0
Paul DiBernardo	12	7	8	15	45	2	20	4
Keith Fulk	12	8	6	14	26	16	17	6
Chris Hellenkamp	11	5	5	10	35	7	6	2
Larry Julius	12	7	5	12	40	21	21	4
Paul Kato	8	2	2	4	16	15	16	6
Warren Lipka	9	0	1	1	0	0	0	2
Joe Mihaljevic	12	2	1	3	17	4	15	2
Jorge Montoya	6	0	0	0	1	2	6	4
Dan O’Keefe	11	14	7	21	59	0	8	2
Otto Orf	4	0	0	0	0	0	0	2
Bronn Pfeiffer	4	0	0	0	1	1	1	0
Bob Poursanidis	5	1	0	1	7	1	2	0
Randy Prescott	12	2	7	9	32	8	16	6
Neil Ridgway	12	12	6	18	34	4	11	4
Martin Rincon	11	2	2	4	15	14	16	2
Carlos Salguero	6	3	7	10	29	1	5	0

- Starting in 1989, the AISA began assigning different point values to goals. All 3-pt., 2-pt, & 1-pt. goals count as one in these stats.

== See also ==
- History of sports in Fort Wayne, Indiana
