= Rubén Tufiño =

Bolivian footballer (born 1970)

Personal information
- Full name: Rubén Dario Tufiño Schwenk
- Date of birth: January 9, 1970 (age 56)
- Place of birth: Santa Cruz de la Sierra, Bolivia
- Height: 1.71 m (5 ft 7 in)
- Position: Defensive midfielder

Youth career
- 1982–1988: Tahuichi Academy
- 1989–1993: South Carolina

Senior career*
Years	Team	Apps	(Gls)
1995–1996	Oriente Petrolero	?	(?)
1997–1999	Blooming	115	(11)
2000	Oriente Petrolero	14	(1)
2001	Blooming	9	(3)
2002–2004	Bolívar	97	(9)
2005	The Strongest	29	(7)
2006	Blooming	10	(0)

International career
1995–2004	Bolivia	35	(1)
- * Club domestic league appearances and goals

Rubén Darío Tufiño Schwenk (born January 9, 1970, in Santa Cruz de la Sierra) is a former Bolivian football midfielder who played in the Liga de Fútbol Profesional Boliviano for important clubs, as well as, the Bolivia national team.

== Club career ==
He began playing football at a young age for the prestigious Tahuichi Academy, where he later received a scholarship to play for the University of South Carolina. During his years as a Gamecock Tufiño became one of the most successful players in the school program's history.

After graduating from college, he decided to continue developing his football career and in 1995 he returned to his country to sign with first division club Oriente Petrolero. After two great seasons in Oriente, he transferred to main rival Blooming where he was part of back-to-back national titles. Due to a disagreement in his contract he returned to Oriente Petrolero the following season, before joining the celestes for the second time around in 2001. The following year, Tufiño signed with Bolívar from La Paz, where he spent the next two campaigns and added two more national championships to his resume. After negotiating with The Strongest, he agreed to a one-year deal with the atigrados which he played for during 2005. Finally, in 2006 he made his third spell with Blooming and by the end of the season he announced his retirement from football.

== International career ==
He also played for the Bolivia national team between 1995 and 2004, scoring 1 goal in 35 international games.

== Honours ==
=== Club ===
- Blooming
  - Liga de Fútbol Profesional Boliviano: 1998, 1999
- Bolívar
  - Liga de Fútbol Profesional Boliviano: 2002, 2004 (A)
