= Steve Boardman (soccer) =

American soccer player (born 1964)

Personal information
- Date of birth: August 25, 1964 (age 62)
- Place of birth: San Diego, California, U.S.
- Height: 6 ft 0 in (1.83 m)
- Position: Defender

College career
Years	Team	Apps	(Gls)
1983–1986	San Diego State Aztecs		

Senior career*
Years	Team	Apps	(Gls)
1986–1989	San Diego Nomads		
1987–1988	Los Angeles Lazers (indoor)	9	(0)
1988–1989	Fort Wayne Flames (indoor)	21	(2)
1989–1990	Indiana Blast (indoor)	40	(3)
1990–1992	Detroit Rockers (indoor)	80	(16)
1992–1993	Baltimore Spirit (indoor)	39	(18)
1993	Los Angeles United (indoor)	28	(6)
1993–1994	Detroit Rockers (indoor)	34	(10)
1994	Baltimore Spirit (indoor)	9	(1)
1994–1995	Harrisburg Heat (indoor)	29	(4)
1997	Baltimore Spirit (indoor)	4	(0)
- * Club domestic league appearances and goals

Steve Boardman (born August 25, 1964) is an American retired soccer defender who played professionally in the Western Soccer Alliance, Major Indoor Soccer League and National Professional Soccer League.

== Youth ==
Growing up, he played for the La Jolla Nomads soccer club. He graduated from La Jolla High School and attended San Diego State University where he played on the men's soccer team from 1983 to 1986.

== Professional ==
From 1986 through 1989, Boardman played for the San Diego Nomads of the Western Soccer League. He was a 1987 First Team All League defender with the Nomads. In 1987, he signed with the Los Angeles Lazers of the Major Indoor Soccer League. The Lazers released him at the end of the season and Boardman moved to the Fort Wayne Flames of the American Indoor Soccer Association for the 1988–1989 indoor season. He played from 1990 to 1992 with the Detroit Rockers of the National Professional Soccer League. In 1992, the Rockers won the league title. On October 22, 1992, the Baltimore Spirit signed Boardman to a one-year contract. In June 1993, the Spirit traded Boardman to the St. Louis Ambush for Dan O’Keefe. On December 2, 1994, the Spirit traded him and Tarik Walker to the Harrisburg Heat in exchange for Franklin McIntosh. He finished the season with the Heat, then retired. In February 1997, the Baltimore Spirit signed Boardman for the upcoming playoffs. He again retired at the end of the season.

== Coach ==
From 2001 to 2004, Boardman coached the soccer team at St. Paul's School in Maryland.
