= Makan Hislop =

Trinidad and Tobago footballer

Personal information
- Full name: Makan Hislop
- Date of birth: September 3, 1985 (age 41)
- Place of birth: Hope, Tobago, Trinidad and Tobago
- Height: 6 ft 3 in (1.91 m)
- Position: Defender

Team information
- Current team: Bethel United
- Number: 21

College career
Years	Team	Apps	(Gls)
2002–2005	South Carolina Gamecocks	70	(4)

Senior career*
Years	Team	Apps	(Gls)
2005–2009	United Petrotrin	145	(16)
2010–2011	Joe Public Tunapuna		
2012–2013	St. Clairs Coaching School		
2013–	Bethel United		

International career^{‡}
2007–2010	Trinidad and Tobago	33	(0)
- * Club domestic league appearances and goals as of 30 April 2025 ‡ National team caps and goals as of 30 April 2025

Makan Hislop (born 3 September 1985) is a Trinidad and Tobago football (soccer) player.

== Career ==
Before playing professionally in Trinidad, Hislop played for four years at the University of South Carolina in Columbia under the legendary coach Mark Berson; for two of those years a teammate was U.S. goalkeeper Brad Guzan.

== International career ==
Hislop has made 33 official appearances for the Trinidad and Tobago national football team.

== Personal ==
He is the cousin of goalkeeper Shaka Hislop.
