= Josh Alcala =

American soccer player

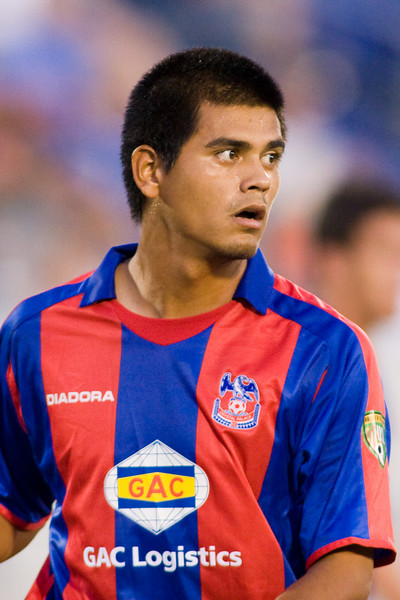

Personal information
- Full name: Joshua Vincent Alcala
- Date of birth: January 5, 1984 (age 42)
- Place of birth: Austin, Texas, United States
- Height: 5 ft 9 in (1.75 m)
- Position: Forward

Team information
- Current team: Austin Aztex
- Number: 13

Youth career
- 2002–2006: South Carolina Gamecocks

Senior career*
Years	Team	Apps	(Gls)
2005	Austin Lightning	7	(0)
2007	Crystal Palace Baltimore	19	(3)
2008	Austin Aztex U23	9	(1)
2009	Austin Aztex	14	(1)
2012–	Austin Aztex	6	(0)
- * Club domestic league appearances and goals as of June 18, 2012

Joshua Vincent "Josh" Alcala (born January 5, 1984, in Austin, Texas) is an American–born soccer player of Filipino and Hispanic descent. He is currently a free agent.

== Career ==
=== Early career ===
Alcala grew up in Buda, Texas, attended Hays High School, and played college soccer at the University of South Carolina between 2002 and 2006, where during his senior year he was named the offensive MVP and received first-team honors in Conference USA. Alcala also played in the USL Premier Development League for Austin Lightning.

=== Professional ===
Alcala turned professional in December 2006, signing a contract with USL Second Division expansion side Crystal Palace Baltimore. He made 19 appearances, and scored 3 goals for Palace, before leaving the club in October 2007.

In 2008, Alcala decided to join his hometown PDL team, Austin Aztex U23, in preparation for the debut of the senior Austin Aztex USL1 team in 2009. He formally signed for the Aztex on 26 March 2009. He was released by the Aztex at the end of the 2009 season.

Alcala is currently the Assistant Women's Soccer Coach at Colorado College Athletics.https://cctigers.com/sports/womens-soccer/roster/coaches/joshua-alcala/1327
