= Mark Berson =

American soccer coach (born 1953)

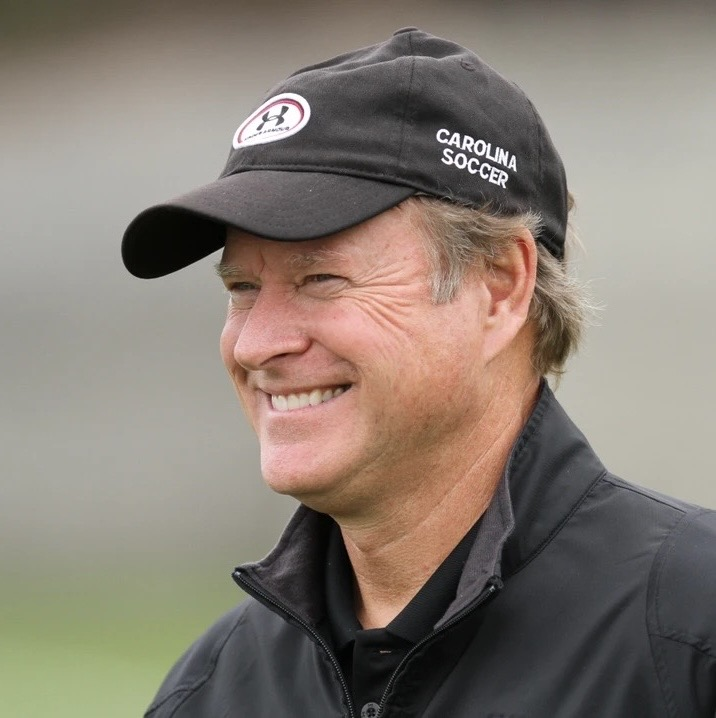
- Berson in 2020

Biographical details
- Born: March 16, 1953 (age 73); Hartford, Connecticut

Playing career
- 1971–1974: North Carolina Tar Heels

Coaching career (HC unless noted)
- 1977: The Citadel Bulldogs
- 1978–2020: South Carolina Gamecocks

Head coaching record
- Overall: 522-266-76
- Tournaments: 22 NCAA Tournaments; 11 Sweet Sixteens; 4 Elite Eights; 2 College Cups; 1 Championship Final

Accomplishments and honors

Championships
- Conference USA Regular Season Championship (2011); Conference USA Tournament Championship (2010); Conference USA Tournament Championship (2005); Metro Regular Season Championship (1993)

Awards
- National Soccer Coaches Association Coach of the Year (1984, 1985, 1988, 1995); South Carolina Youth Soccer Association's Hall of Fame (1992); Independent Coach of the Year (1998) Conference USA Coach of the Year 2011; Bill Jeffrey Award (2014); South Carolina Letterman's Hall of Fame (2015); State of South Carolina Athletic Hall of Fame (2023)

Records
- No. 3 All-Time in Division I wins 22 NCAA Tournaments in 43 years Ten Top 10 final rankings Seven Top 5 final rankings

Mark Berson (born March 16, 1953 in Hartford, Connecticut) is an American former soccer player and coach. Berson started his coaching career at The Citadel in 1976 and then spent 43 seasons as the head men's soccer coach at the University of South Carolina. He holds a US Soccer "A" coaching license and was a member of the US Soccer National Instructional Staff from 1989 to 2023. He served as the head coach of the U.S. Men's U-18 National Team and was active on the Region III (South) staff as a coach for two decades competing in tournaments in Europe, Mexico and South America.

Berson retired from college soccer after the 2021 season with 522 career wins – the most wins of any active NCAA Division I coach and one of only three Division I coaches with more than 500 wins. Berson's South Carolina coaching record stands at 511-261-76 (.647) with an overall record of 522-266-76 (.648). At South Carolina, Berson coached 375 student-athletes who received more than 250 awards for their performance both on and off the field.

Since 2022, Berson has served as an on-site match director for Major League Soccer (MLS). In the summer of 2025, Berson also served as a FIFA on-site match commissioner for the 2025 FIFA Club World Cup Tournament in the United States.

== Collegiate career ==
Berson attended Summit High School in Summit, New Jersey where he was a midfielder on the 1969 N.J. state championship team. He subsequently enrolled at the University of North Carolina. where he played midfield his freshman year and goalkeeper the final three years. He received the UNC Educational Foundation Award for Men's Soccer in his senior year and graduated with a bachelor's degree in journalism. He then earned a master's degree in sport administration from Ohio University.

== Coaching career ==
Berson took a position as the assistant coach on The Citadel's men's soccer program in 1976. A year later, he became the head coach and guided the Bulldogs to their best record ever with an 11–5 mark. In 1978, Berson accepted the head coaching position at the University of South Carolina – which included the task of elevating men's soccer from a club sport to a varsity sport. He led the Gamecocks to a 13–3–1 record in the program's first season. In the second season, the Gamecocks went 14-5-0 and earned their first berth in the NCAA Men's Soccer Championship.

Gamecock Soccer achieved a high level success under Berson's guidance, including 34 winning seasons in 43 years; 22 NCAA Tournaments; 10 top ten final rankings; and 7 top five final rankings. Because the Southeastern Conference (SEC) did not sponsor men's soccer, South Carolina competed as an independent for 28 years, routinely playing one of the toughest schedules in the country. South Carolina won 4 conference championships in 15 years of conference affiliation.

When Berson retired, South Carolina ranked 16th all-time in Division I winning percentage (top 8%); 12th all-time in Division I NCAA Tournament appearances (top 6%); and 10th in Division I NCAA Tournament appearances from 1977 – the year Berson founded the South Carolina program (top 5%).

Berson coached 13 All-Americans (including two National Goalkeepers of the Year); 15 Freshman All-Americans (including one National Freshman of the Year); 12 CoSIDA Academic All-Americans; 79 National Soccer Coaches Association of America (NSCAA, now called United Soccer Coaches) All-South Region honorees; and 70 All-Conference players (in 15 years), including 17 first team selections and 4 Freshman of the Year selections.

32 Gamecocks played for their respective national teams, including the U.S. U-17, U-18, U-20 and U-23 National Teams, the U.S. Olympic Team, and the U.S. Men's National Team (USMNT). Remarkably, there was at least one former Gamecock player on the USMNT for 21 consecutive years – most notably, Clint Mathis, Josh Wolff and Brad Guzan. South Carolina was one of only two college programs (the other was UCLA) to have at least one player competing in the 2002 (Korea/Japan), 2006 (Germany), 2010 (South Africa) and 2014 (Brazil) World Cup Finals. After their college careers, more than 65 Gamecock players were drafted or signed to play professional soccer in the U.S. and abroad.

During Berson's tenure, Gamecock Soccer also excelled in the classroom, earning 12 NSCAA Academic Team Awards (1999, 2001, 2003, 2009, 2010, 2011, 2012, 2013, 2014 and 2016) and posting the highest team GPA in the nation twice (2010 and 2013).

== Honors ==
Berson received multiple NCSAA South Region coach of the year honors, conference coach of the year honors, and independent coach of the year honors. He is a recipient of the prestigious Bill Jeffery Award from the United States Soccer Coaches Association (USCAA, now known as United Soccer Coaches) for his outstanding service and achievement in college soccer, which included the following citation: "Berson's colleagues have described him as someone who shaped the college game through his tenure of service to his players. In addition to Berson being a soccer coach at one of the highest levels, he is respected more importantly for being a gentleman."

Berson has been inducted into the University of South Carolina Lettermen's Association Hall of Fame, the State of South Carolina Athletic Hall of Fame, and the South Carolina Youth Soccer Association Hall of Fame.

Following Berson's retirement, the USC men's soccer alumni and friends of the USC men's soccer program endowed an annual scholarship his name and the University of South Carolina Gamecock Club created a webpage to celebrate his career at: https://thegamecockclub.com/celebrating-mark-berson/.

== Coaching tree and legacy ==
Berson inspired a number of his players to become coaches and to advance their careers once they entered the profession. Former Gamecock players and assistant coaches have become head coaches in at least 19 collegiate soccer programs, including: Appalachian State, Bates, Brown, Central Florida, Chicago, Clemson, Davidson, Evansville, Florida Atlantic, Furman, Kentucky (women), Montclair State, Morehead State (women), Mount Saint Mary's (MD), Newberry, Regis, St. John's, Washington College and Washington College (women.).

Gamecock players and assistant coaches have also served as head coach, assistant coach, chief operating officer, sporting director, scout, and on-site match director for various MLS clubs, as well as the president and chief soccer officer of the United Soccer League (USL).

Gamecock players have gone on to distinguished careers in many other fields, including business, finance, technology, law, medicine, government, law enforcement, education, medical research, dentistry, real estate development, film and music – including Jim "Soni" Sonefeld of Hootie & the Blowfish.

== Head coaching record ==
Season	College	Won	Lost	Tied	Notes
1977	The Citadel	11	5	0	
1978	South Carolina	13	3	1	
1979	South Carolina	14	5	0	NCAA Appearance
1980	South Carolina	12	5	2	
1981	South Carolina	16	4	1	
1982	South Carolina	12	5	2	
1983	South Carolina	8	11	2	
1984	South Carolina	14	4	2	
1985	South Carolina	20	3	1	NCAA Appearance
1986	South Carolina	17	5	0	NCAA Appearance
1987	South Carolina	16	2	3	NCAA Appearance
1988	South Carolina	14	4	4	NCAA Appearance
1989	South Carolina	17	3	2	NCAA Appearance
1990	South Carolina	14	5	2	NCAA Appearance
1991	South Carolina	14	5	0	NCAA Appearance
1992	South Carolina	13	5	3	NCAA Appearance
1993	South Carolina	16	4	4	Metro Champions; NCAA Appearance
1994	South Carolina	16	4	0	NCAA Appearance
1995	South Carolina	16	4	0	
1996	South Carolina	8	9	2	
1997	South Carolina	16	3	1	NCAA Appearance
1998	South Carolina	16	5	0	NCAA Appearance
1999	South Carolina	10	7	2	
2000	South Carolina	12	4	3	NCAA Appearance
2001	South Carolina	12	5	2	NCAA Appearance
2002	South Carolina	11	8	1	NCAA Appearance
2003	South Carolina	9	7	2	
2004	South Carolina	12	7	1	NCAA Appearance
2005	South Carolina	12	7	2	Conference USA Tournament Champions; NCAA Appearance
2006	South Carolina	11	5	1	
2007	South Carolina	11	6	2	
2008	South Carolina	10	6	5	
2009	South Carolina	7	8	5	
2010	South Carolina	13	8	2	Conference USA Tournament Champions; NCAA Appearance
2011	South Carolina	9	7	2	Conference USA Regular Season Champions; NCAA Appearance
2012	South Carolina	5	11	2	
2013	South Carolina	7	7	5	
2014	South Carolina	10	10	0	
2015	South Carolina	11	8	2	NCAA Appearance
2016	South Carolina	11	8	1	NCAA Appearance
2017	South Carolina	6	9	2	
2018	South Carolina	7	10	0	
2019	South Carolina	7	9	2	
2020	South Carolina	8	7	1	gamecocksonline.com - Men's Soccer - 2023 South Carolina Men's Soccer History & Records - Head Coaching Records
	Overall	522	266	76	22 NCAA Appearances
