= New York Kick =

Former professional indoor soccer team based in Albany, New York

The New York Kick was a professional indoor soccer team based in Albany, New York playing at the Knickerbocker Arena and competed in the National Professional Soccer League (1984–2001).

The team was previously known as the Indiana Kick in 1989–90. The Indiana Kick played their games at the Allen County War Memorial Coliseum in Fort Wayne, Indiana. The Kick were created under the ownership of Kent Phillips after the Fort Wayne Flames folded following the 1988–89 season.

== Coaches ==
- (United States) Warren Lipka (1989–90)

== Year-by-year ==
Year	Division	League	Reg. season	Playoffs	City	Avg. attendance
1989–90	2	AISA	4th, National	Did not qualify	Fort Wayne, Indiana	2,324
1990–91	2	AISA	5th, American	Did not qualify	Albany, New York	1,925

== See also ==
- History of sports in Fort Wayne, Indiana
