= 1989 Fort Lauderdale Strikers season =

Fort Lauderdale Strikers
1989 season
- Owner(s): (United States) Joe Robbie; Noel Lemon
- Manager: Thomas Rongen
- Stadium: Lockhart Stadium
- ASL Southern Division: Second place
- ASL Championship: Winner
- National Championship: Winner
Home colors	Away colors

The 1989 Fort Lauderdale Strikers season was the second season of the team in the new American Soccer League. It was the club's twenty-third season in professional soccer. The team finished in second place in the Southern Division, and made it through the playoffs and into the ASL Championship. They became the 1989 Champions. They also won the 1989 National Pro Soccer Championship which pitted the ASL Champions against the Western Soccer League Champions in a unification match to determine a national champion. Following the season, the American Soccer League merged with the WSL to form the American Professional Soccer League in 1990. The team would be absorbed into the new league and continue to play there.

== Competitions ==
=== ASL regular season ===
Southern Division
Pos	Team	Pld	W	PKW	PKL	L	GF	GA	GD	Pts
1	Tampa Bay Rowdies	20	9	3	2	6	32	25	+7	35
2	Fort Lauderdale Strikers	20	10	2	1	7	33	25	+8	35
3	Washington Diplomats	20	8	3	3	6	32	26	+6	33
4	Orlando Lions	20	9	0	3	8	25	20	+5	30
5	Miami Sharks	20	1	2	2	15	20	51	−31	9

=== ASL Playoffs ===
==== Bracket ====
Semifinals; Best-of-3
1	Washington Diplomats	1	1	-
4	Fort Lauderdale Strikers	3	3	-
2	Tampa Bay Rowdies	0	1	-
3	Boston Bolts	2	2	-

ASL Championship; Best-of-3
4	Fort Lauderdale Strikers	1	0	1
3	Boston Bolts	0	2	0

==== Semifinal 1 ====
August 12, 1989
8:00 PM EST

Fort Lauderdale Strikers (FL)	3–1	Washington Stars (DC)
Ricardo Alonso (44:58); Ricardo Alonso (62:49); Ricardo Alonso; Victor Moreland (yellow card) 81:14'	report	Scott Snyder (30:50); Dave Vaudrieul (yellow card) 35:30'; Doug Davies (yellow card) 81:14'

Lockhart Stadium, Fort Lauderdale, Florida
Attendance: 4,784
Referee: Jack D'Aquin (USA)

August 13, 1989
7:00 PM EST

Washington Stars (DC)	1–3	Fort Lauderdale Strikers (FL)
Scott Snyder	report	Marcelo Carrera 20' (Moreland); Pedro Magallanes (53:29); Pedro Magallanes (65:00)

W.T. Woodson High School, Fairfax, Virginia
Attendance: 3,287

==== Semifinal 2 ====
August 12, 1989
7:30 EST

Boston Bolts (MA)	2–0	Tampa Bay Rowdies (FL)
Steve Potter (54:14); Stan Koziol (76:09)	report	Perry Van der Beck (yellow card) 29'

Nickerson Field, Boston, Massachusetts
Attendance: 1,951
Referee: Felix Fuksman (USA)

August 13, 1989
7:00 EST

Tampa Bay Rowdies (FL)	1–2	Boston Bolts (MA)
Steve Wegerle (51:45)	report	Patrick Hughes (41:45); Steve Potter (85:30)

Tampa Stadium, Tampa, Florida
Attendance: 5,101

==== Final ====
August 19, 1989
8:00 EST

Fort Lauderdale Strikers (FL)	1–0	Boston Bolts (MA)
Marcelo Carrera (4:38)	report	(yellow card) 44:40' Greg Kenney

Lockhart Stadium, Fort Lauderdale, Florida
Attendance: 5,752

August 26, 1989
7:30 EST

Boston Bolts (MA)	2–0	Fort Lauderdale Strikers (FL)
Steve Potter; Paul Duffy (74:03)	report

Nickerson Field, Boston, Massachusetts
Attendance: 5,730

August 26, 1989
mini-game

Boston Bolts (MA)	0–1	Fort Lauderdale Strikers (FL)
	report	Marcelo Carrera

Nickerson Field, Boston, Massachusetts
Attendance: 5,730

== 1989 National Professional Soccer Championship ==
On September 9, 1989, the WSL (WSA) Champion San Diego Nomads played the ASL Champion Fort Lauderdale Strikers in order to crown a "national" champion for the first time since 1984. The game was played at Spartan Stadium in San Jose, California before 8,632 fans. The match remained scoreless until the 74th minute when San Diego's Jerome Watson scored on a Thien Nguyen free kick. Just over a minute later, national team forward Eric Eichmann scored for Fort Lauderdale. Ten minutes later Troy Edwards put the Strikers ahead on a Marcelo Carrera assist in the 85th minute. Carrera got a goal of his own when he scored in the 90th minute on an assist from Victor Moreland. His efforts earned Carrera man-of-the-match honors. The game was televised live by Pacific Sports Network, with JP Dellacamera providing play-by-play and Rick Davis adding color commentary.

1989 ASL/WSL Championship
Year	Winner	Runners-up	Score	Venue	Location	Attendance
1989	Fort Lauderdale Strikers (1)	San Diego Nomads	3-1	Spartan Stadium	San Jose, California	8,632

=== Match report ===
September 9, 1989
7:30 PST

San Diego Nomads (California)	1–3	(Florida) Fort Lauderdale Strikers
Watson (73:13); Ortiz (yellow card) 86:10'	Report	Moreland (yellow card) 44:40'; Eichmann (74:24); Edwards (84:40); Carrera (89:00)

Spartan Stadium, San Jose, California
Attendance: 8,632
Referee: Levon Baladjanian
