= 1989 National Pro Soccer Championship =

Soccer tournament in U.S.

- Event: ASL-WSL National Pro Soccer Championship
San Diego Nomads	Fort Lauderdale Strikers
WSL	ASL
1	3
- Date: September 9, 1989
- Venue: Spartan Stadium, San Jose, California
- Man of the Match: Marcelo Carrera
- Referee: Levon Baladjanian
- Attendance: 8,632

1989 National Pro Soccer Championship was the championship final for professional soccer in the U.S. in 1989. The match was contested on September 9, 1989. The WSL Champion, San Diego Nomads took on the ASL Champion, Fort Lauderdale Strikers in order to crown a national professional champion for the first time since 1984. The game was played at Spartan Stadium in San Jose, California.

== The match-up ==
By most accounts it was considered a David vs Goliath match-up from the start. Fort Lauderdale was a fully professional squad with a mix of mostly international players. Several were former NASL all-stars, including 1982 goal scoring champion, Ricardo Alonso. ASL teams allowed players with green card work status to count as US roster members. Conversely, San Diego was a defense-first, semi-pro team loaded with home-grown amateurs that included three 17-year-old, high schoolers. WSL teams were limited to a maximum of two non-US citizens per team on the field at any time. To make matters worse for the Nomads, because of late date of the match, NCAA rules prohibited six players, including USMNT defender Marcelo Balboa and starting goalie Anton Nistl from participating. Two loaners from the MISL champion, San Diego Sockers were also ruled out because the injury-conscious Sockers organization felt the match was too close to the start of the new MISL season. This left the Nomads scrambling to fill in all of the holes, particularly at the back.

== Background ==
=== San Diego Nomads ===
The San Diego Nomads qualified for the playoffs by virtue of winning the WSL South Division with 99 points. The point total also earned them the top seed and the right to host all WSL playoff rounds. The Nomads reached the league finals for third consecutive year by defeating the Portland Timbers on July 23 in the semifinal match, 2–1. Three weeks later they dispatched the San Francisco Bay Blackhawks, 1–0, in the WSL finals, to claim their second WSL title in three years, and advance to the national championship game.

=== Fort Lauderdale Strikers ===
The Fort Lauderdale Strikers qualified for the playoffs by virtue of a second place finish in the ASL Southern Division with 35 points. The point total earned them the number four seed. The Strikers upset the number one seeded Washington Stars in the semifinals, sweeping both matches on August 12 and 13 to advance to their second straight ASL finals. The following week they needed the 30-minute, mini-game tie breaker to beat the Boston Bolts, 2 matches to 1, in the championship finals, to claim the ASL title. The victory earned them the right to play the San Diego Nomads on September 9.

== Game summary ==
=== Recap ===
The first half was one of end-to-end action, but also of missed opportunities, especially for San Diego. Despite the long odds, the Nomads repeatedly used the speed of their youthful squad to exploit their older opponents. At the 2:18 mark, Paul Wright had a sure goal headed off the line by Strikers captain Victor Moreland. The Nomads were repeatedly stopped in one-on-one looks at goal by USMNT veteran, Arnie Mausser. In 20th minute Rene Ortiz broke free, but was denied. Wright missed two more chances 22nd and 28th minute respectively. Ortiz and Jerome Watson also missed other opportunities to give San Diego an early lead. In all, Mausser and Nomads goalie Jeff Duback combined for 14 first-half saves.

The match remained scoreless until the 74th minute when Watson scored from 8 yards for San Diego, by volleying in Thien Nguyen's free kick from the edge of the penalty area. Just over a minute later, forward Eric Eichmann leveled the match on a rebound shot from 18 yards for the Strikers. Ortiz narrowly missed returning San Diego to lead, as his 80th minute shot blew just wide of the far post from a tough angle. Ten minutes later Troy Edwards put Fort Lauderdale ahead to stay thanks to a spectacular Marcelo Carrera bicycle kick assist in the 85th minute. With the Nomads pressing to equalize, Carrera then notched a goal of his own in the 90th minute on an assist from Victor Moreland.

For his efforts, Carrera earned man-of-the-match honors. Fort Lauderdale players and coaches alike acknowledged the Nomads' speed advantage in post-match interviews. Likewise, San Diego players acknowledged their veteran opponents' composure in the face constant pressure. The game was televised live by Pacific Sports Network with JP Dellacamera doing play-by-play, and Rick Davis on color commentary. It was also broadcast in several other television markets on a tape-delayed basis.

=== Championship results ===
September 9
7:30 pm PDT

San Diego Nomads	1–3	Fort Lauderdale Strikers
Watson (73:13)	Report	Eichmann (74:24); Edwards (84:40); Carrera (89:00)

Spartan Stadium, San Jose, California
Attendance: 8,632
Referee: Levon Baladjanian

San Diego	Fort Lauderdale

GK	(United States) Jeff Duback
D	(United States) Arturo Velazco (c)
D	(United States) Scott Platenberg
D	(United States) Steve Boardman
D	(United States) Mario Gonzalez
M	(United States) Charley Marshall
M	(United States) Rene Ortiz	(yellow card) 86:10'
F	(United States) Thien Nguyen
F	(England) Paul Wright
F	(United States) Jerome Watson
F	(United States) Andy Burke	(substituted off) 88:10'
Substitutes:
GK	(United States) Chris Haap
D	(United States) Lucas Martin	(substituted on) 88:10'
M	(United States) Toby Taitano
Manager:
(England) Derek Armstrong

GK	(United States) Arnie Mausser
D	(Northern Ireland) Jimmy McGeough Jr.
D	(United States) Troy Edwards
D	(Northern Ireland) Victor Moreland (c)	(yellow card) 44:40'
M	(Netherlands) Thomas Rongen
M	(United States) Kenny Borden
M	(Socialist Federal Republic of Yugoslavia) Miljce Donev
M	(Argentina) Marcelo Carrera
F	(United States) Eric Eichmann
F	(Argentina) Ricardo Alonso
F	(Argentina) Pedro Magallanes
Substitutes:
GK	(Canada) Dave Landry
Manager:
(Netherlands) Thomas Rongen

1989 U.S. Professional Soccer Champions: Fort Lauderdale Strikers
Television: Pacific Sports Network (live), and Prime Ticket (tape delayed)
Announcers: JP Dellacamera, Rick Davis

Championship MVP:
Marcelo Carrera (Fort Lauderdale)
Assistant referees:
Brian Hall
Abraham Ramirez

=== Statistics ===
Statistic	San Diego	Fort Lauderdale
Goals scored	1	3
Total shots	16	19
Shots on target	8	12
Saves	9	7
Corner kicks	6	5
Offsides	7	2
Fouls	22	17
Yellow cards	1	1
Red cards	0	0

== See also ==
- 1989 American Soccer League
- 1989 Western Soccer League
