= 1988 American Soccer League =

American Soccer League
- Season: 1988
- Teams: 10
- Champions: Washington Diplomats (1st title)
- Premiers: New Jersey Eagles (1st title)
- Matches: 100
- Goals: 300 (3 per match)
- Top goalscorer: Jorge Acosta (14 goals)

The 1988 American Soccer League was the first season of the American Soccer League which took place during the summer of 1988.

== History ==
The third American Soccer League owed its creation to several events in the early 1980s. In 1983, the second American Soccer League collapsed from over-expansion, runaway spending and a restricted fan base. A year later, the North American Soccer League collapsed for essentially the same reasons. In 1985, the West-coast based Western Soccer Alliance was created as a regional, financially austere league. This new league kept expenditures low while building its fan base. In 1987, the Lone Star Soccer Alliance began its first season, mimicking the WSA model with teams in or near Texas. On May 7, 1987, several team executives led by Clive Toye announced the creation of an east coast-based league using the WSA model. This new league, named the American Soccer League, planned to begin its first season in 1988. Chuck Blazer was announced as the league's commissioner and Clive Toye was named its chairman.

The league planned a twenty-game schedule with at least six teams having a $75,000 salary cap. The league initially concentrated on the northeast, but in August 1987, plans expanded to include teams situated in Florida. This was soon followed by announcements of the entry of the Fort Lauderdale Strikers and Tampa Bay Rowdies. By October 1987, the list of teams was finalized with the addition of the Orlando Lions and Miami Sharks. The league now divided itself into two five-team divisions. On April 9, 1988, the American Soccer League began its first season when the New Jersey Eagles defeated the Miami Sharks, 2–1. When the regular season ended the first week of August, Eagles had topped the standings with forty-five points. Four teams made the playoffs, the top two from both the Northern and Southern Divisions. The Washington Diplomats which had the worst record of the four playoff teams, stunned the league by defeating first the New Jersey Eagles, then the Fort Lauderdale Strikers to win the first league championship.

== League standings ==
=== Northern Division ===
Pos	Team	Pld	W	L	GF	GA	Pts
1	New Jersey Eagles	20	15	5	39	24	45
2	Maryland Bays	20	12	8	32	31	36
3	Washington Stars	20	11	9	31	28	33
4	Boston Bolts	20	9	11	31	33	27
5	Albany Capitals	20	7	13	26	35	21

=== Southern Division ===
Pos	Team	Pld	W	L	GF	GA	Pts
1	Fort Lauderdale Strikers	20	14	6	46	25	42
2	Washington Diplomats	20	10	10	27	30	30
3	Tampa Bay Rowdies	20	10	10	23	21	30
4	Orlando Lions	20	8	12	21	31	24
5	Miami Sharks	20	4	16	24	42	12

== Playoffs ==
=== Bracket ===
Semifinals; Best-of-3
1	New Jersey Eagles	1	1	1
4	Washington Diplomats	4	0	4
2	Fort Lauderdale Strikers	5	6	-
3	Maryland Bays	2	0	-

1988 ASL Championship; Best-of-3
4	Washington Diplomats	4	3	-
2	Fort Lauderdale Strikers	3	2	-

=== Semifinal 1 ===
August 13, 1988
3:00 PM EDT

Maryland Bays (MD)	2–5	Fort Lauderdale Strikers (FL)
Vernon Skinner (yellow card) 28'; Sylvanus Oriaikhi 44'; Kurt Dasbach 80'	Report	17' Ray Hudson; 65', 75', 85' Steve Kinsey; 85' Ricardo Alonso

Byrd Stadium, Columbia, Maryland
Attendance: 1,808

August 14, 1988
8:00 PM EDT

Fort Lauderdale Strikers (FL)	6–0	Maryland Bays (MD)
Steve Kinsey 5', 46', 88'; Ken Fogarty (yellow card) 13'; Miljce Donev 44'; Ray Hudson 64'; Marcelo Carrera 69'	Report	(yellow card) 90' Sylvanus Oriaikhi

Lockhart Stadium, Fort Lauderdale, Florida
Attendance: 1,406

Fort Lauderdale advances two games to none.

=== Semifinal 2 ===
August 13, 1988
8:00 PM EDT

Washington Diplomats (DC)	4–1	New Jersey Eagles (NJ)
Duncan Reynard 13'; Jean Harbor 18', 65'; Leonel Suazo 84'		78' Mario Chavez

RFK Stadium, Washington, D.C.
Attendance: 2,346

August 14, 1988
5:00 PM EDT

New Jersey Eagles (NJ)	1–0	Washington Diplomats (DC)
Ken Lolla 64'

Hinchliffe Stadium, Paterson, New Jersey
Attendance: 1,531

August 14, 1988

New Jersey Eagles (NJ)	1–4	Washington Diplomats (DC)
Mario Chavez 2'		11' Jean Harbor; 13', 26' Marco Casas-Cordero; 20' Fernando Iturbe

Hinchliffe Stadium, Paterson, New Jersey
Attendance: 1,531

Washington advances two games to one.

=== ASL Championship Final ===
Higher seed	Series	Lower seed	Game 1	Game 2	Mini-game	Attendance
Fort Lauderdale Strikers	2–0	Washington Diplomats	3–4	2–3	x	August 21 • RFK Stadium • 5,745; August 27 • Lockhart Stadium • 4,257

==== Game 1 ====
August 21, 1988
8:00 PM EDT

Washington Diplomats (DC)	4–3	Fort Lauderdale Strikers (FL)
Michael Brady 17:26', 21:43'; Joaquin Canales 54:29' (Harbor, Simmons); Ronald Simmons 89:30' (pen.)	Report	Ricardo Alonso 56:50' (Carrera, Hudson); Mark Schwartz 57:11' (Hudson); Thomas Rongen 86:36'

RFK Stadium, Washington, D.C.
Attendance: 5,745

==== Game 2 ====
August 27, 1988
8:00 EDT

Fort Lauderdale Strikers (FL)	2–3	Washington Diplomats (DC)
Ricardo Alonso 27:57', 33:20' (Carrera)	Report	Leonel Suazo 29:40' (Canales); Keith Trehy 30:50'; Michael Brady 35:30' (Hong)

Lockhart Stadium, Fort Lauderdale, Florida
Attendance: 4,257

== Points leaders ==
Rank	Scorer	Club	Goals	Assists	Points
1	Jorge Acosta	New Jersey Eagles	14	4	32
2	Steve Kinsey	Fort Lauderdale Strikers	10	3	23
3	Teófilo Cubillas	Fort Lauderdale Strikers	7	5	17
4	Mark Lamb	Orlando Lions	8	1	17
5	Scott Snyder	Washington Stars	8	1	17
6	Maicol Antelo	New Jersey Eagles	6	4	16
7	Roger Chavez	New Jersey Eagles	5	6	16
8	Marcelo Carrera	Fort Lauderdale Strikers	4	8	16
9	Mirko Castillo	Fort Lauderdale Strikers	5	5	15
10	Guillermo Pizzaro	Miami Sharks	6	2	14
11	Andy Bing	Boston Bolts	5	4	14
11	Russ Downing	Albany Capitals	4	6	14
11	Leonel Suazo	Washington Diplomats	6	1	13
11	Mike Sweeney	Boston Bolts	5	3	13
11	Kurt Manal	Boston Bolts	5	3	13

== 1988 ASL All-Star game ==
The ASL All-Star game was hosted by the Fort Lauderdale Strikers at Lockhart Stadium. Players that were unable to play due to injury, as well as any Strikers selected to the squad were replaced, since the All-Stars' opponent was the Strikers. George Best also suited up for the Strikers in the match. The match ended in a 3–3 draw after 90 minutes, and moved directly to a penalty shootout. Both teams converted four of five attempts, and in an unusual move agreed to end it there with the consent of the referees.

=== All-Star selections ===
All-Stars	Position	Alternates
Winston DuBose, Tampa Bay	G	Alan Rough, Orlando
Troy Edwards, Miami	D	Ross Irwin, Boston
Brian Ainscough, New Jersey	D	-
Lou Karbiener, Orlando	D	-
George Lidster, Washington Stars	D	-
Steve Powell, Albany (injured)	M	Dirceu Guimarães, Miami • Andy Harrison, Albany
Sonny Askew, Washington Stars	M	Ray Hudson, Fort Lauderdale
Rob Ryerson, Maryland	M	Teofilo Cubillas, Fort Lauderdale
Steve Wegerle, Tampa Bay	F	Joaquin Canales, Washington Diplomats
Elvis Comrie, Maryland	F	-
Jorge Acosta, New Jersey	F	-
Lincoln Phillips, Maryland	Coach	John Kerr, Washington Stars (assistant coach)

=== Match summary ===
June 16, 1988
7:30 PM EDT

Fort Lauderdale Strikers	3–3	ASL All-Stars
Miljce Donev 14:00' (Cubillas, Carrera); Ray Hudson 36:00' (Carrera); Marcelo Carrera 44:28' (Hudson)	Report 1 Report 2 Report 3	Dirceu Guimarães 53:00' (pen.); Dirceu Guimarães 57:10' (Alonso); Elvis Comrie 60:00' (Acosta, Canales)
Penalties
? (penalty scored) ? (penalty scored) ? (penalty missed) ? (penalty scored) ? (penalty scored)	4–4	(penalty missed) Steve Wegerle; (penalty scored) ? (penalty scored) Elvis Comrie; (penalty scored) ? (penalty scored) Dirceu Guimarães

Lockhart Stadium, Fort Lauderdale, Florida
Attendance: 3,179
Referee: Ed Bellion

== See also ==
- American Soccer League
- 1989 American Soccer League
