= 1989 American Soccer League =

American Soccer League
- Season: 1989
- Champions: Fort Lauderdale Strikers (1st title)
- Premiers: Washington Stars (1st title)
- Matches: 100
- Goals: 266 (2.66 per match)
- Top goalscorer: Ricardo Alonso, Mirko Castillo (10 goals)

The 1989 American Soccer League was the second and final season of the American Soccer League. In 1990, the league merged to form the American Professional Soccer League.

== League standings ==
=== Northern Division ===
Pos	Team	Pld	W	PKW	PKL	L	GF	GA	GD	Pts
1	Washington Stars	20	7	7	2	4	19	14	+5	37
2	Boston Bolts	20	8	5	3	4	27	19	+8	37
3	Albany Capitals	20	10	1	4	5	29	19	+10	36
4	Maryland Bays	20	4	5	5	6	28	32	−4	27
5	New Jersey Eagles	20	5	1	4	10	21	35	−14	21

=== Southern Division ===
Pos	Team	Pld	W	PKW	PKL	L	GF	GA	GD	Pts
1	Tampa Bay Rowdies	20	9	3	2	6	32	25	+7	35
2	Fort Lauderdale Strikers	20	10	2	1	7	33	25	+8	35
3	Washington Diplomats	20	8	3	3	6	32	26	+6	33
4	Orlando Lions	20	9	0	3	8	25	20	+5	30
5	Miami Sharks	20	1	2	2	15	20	51	−31	9

== Playoffs ==
=== Bracket ===
Semifinals; Best-of-3
1	Washington Diplomats	1	1	-
4	Fort Lauderdale Strikers	3	3	-
2	Tampa Bay Rowdies	0	1	-
3	Boston Bolts	2	2	-

1989 ASL Championship; Best-of-3
4	Fort Lauderdale Strikers	1	0	1
3	Boston Bolts	0	2	0

=== Semifinal 1 ===
August 12, 1989
8:00 PM EST

Fort Lauderdale Strikers (FL)	3–1	Washington Stars (DC)
Ricardo Alonso (44:58); Ricardo Alonso (62:49); Ricardo Alonso; Victor Moreland (yellow card) 81:14'	Report	Scott Snyder (30:50); Dave Vaudrieul (yellow card) 35:30'; Doug Davies (yellow card) 81:14'

Lockhart Stadium, Fort Lauderdale, Florida
Attendance: 4,784
Referee: Jack D'Aquin (USA)

August 13, 1989
7:00 PM EST

Washington Stars (DC)	1–3	Fort Lauderdale Strikers (FL)
Scott Snyder	Report	Marcelo Carrera 20' (Moreland); Pedro Magallanes (53:29); Pedro Magallanes (65:00)

W.T. Woodson High School, Fairfax, Virginia
Attendance: 3,287

Fort Lauderdale advances two games to none.

=== Semifinal 2 ===
August 12, 1989
7:30 EST

Boston Bolts (MA)	2–0	Tampa Bay Rowdies (FL)
Steve Potter (54:14); Stan Koziol (76:09)	Report	Perry Van der Beck (yellow card) 29'

Nickerson Field, Boston, Massachusetts
Attendance: 1,951
Referee: Felix Fuksman (USA)

August 13, 1989
7:00 EST

Tampa Bay Rowdies (FL)	1–2	Boston Bolts (MA)
Steve Wegerle (51:45)	Report	Patrick Hughes (41:45); Steve Potter (85:30)

Tampa Stadium, Tampa, Florida
Attendance: 5,101

Boston advances two games to none.

=== ASL Championship Final ===
Higher seed	Series	Lower seed	Game 1	Game 2	Mini-game	Attendance
Boston Bolts	1–2	Fort Lauderdale Strikers	0–1	2–0	1–0	August 19 • Lockhart Stadium • 5,752; August 26 • Nickerson Field • 5,730

==== Game 1 ====
August 19, 1989
8:00 EST

Fort Lauderdale Strikers (FL)	1–0	Boston Bolts (MA)
Marcelo Carrera (4:38)	Report	Greg Kenney (yellow card) 44:40'

Lockhart Stadium, Fort Lauderdale, Florida
Attendance: 5,752

==== Game 2 ====
August 26, 1989
7:30 EST

Boston Bolts (MA)	2–0	Fort Lauderdale Strikers (FL)
Steve Potter; Paul Duffy (74:03)	Report

Nickerson Field, Boston, Massachusetts
Attendance: 5,730

==== Mini-game ====
August 26, 1989
mini-game

Boston Bolts (MA)	0–1	Fort Lauderdale Strikers (FL)
	Report	Marcelo Carrera

Nickerson Field, Boston, Massachusetts
Attendance: 5,730

== Points leaders ==
Rank	Scorer	Club	Goals	Assists	Points
1	Ricardo Alonso	Fort Lauderdale Strikers	10	7	27
2	Mirko Castillo	Miami Sharks	10	1	21
3	Martin Hill	Tampa Bay Rowdies	7	6	20
3	Leonel Suazo	Washington Diplomats	7	6	20
5	Jean Harbor	Washington Diplomats	7	5	19
6	Marcello Bauza	Washington Diplomats	9	0	18
7	Marcelo Carrera	Fort Lauderdale Strikers	4	10	18
7	Steve Wegerle	Tampa Bay Rowdies	4	10	18
9	Rod Castro	Orlando Lions	8	1	17
10	Scott Snyder	Washington Stars	7	3	17
11	Steve Kinsey	Fort Lauderdale Strikers	6	5	17
12	Elvis Comrie	Albany Capitals	7	2	16
13	Jorge Acosta	New Jersey Eagles	7	1	15
14	Sadri Gjonbalaj	New Jersey Eagles	6	3	15
14	Paul Rutenis	Maryland Bays	6	3	15
15	Dan Donigan	Boston Bolts	4	7	15
16	Pedro Magallanes	Fort Lauderdale Strikers	5	4	14
17	Franklin McIntosh	Orlando Lions	4	6	14
18	Chico Borja	Albany Capitals	1	12	14
19	Patrick Hughes	Boston Bolts	4	5	13
20	Paul Duffy	Boston Bolts	4	4	13

== 1989 ASL All-Star game ==
The ASL All-Star game was hosted by the Washington Diplomats at RFK Stadium. Players that were unable to play due to injury, as well as any Dips selected to the squad were replaced, since the All-Stars' opponent was the Dips.

=== All-Star selections ===
All-Stars	Position	Alternates
Winston DuBose, Tampa Bay	G	Neil Cowley, Washington • Greg Kenney, Boston
Mike Windischmann, Albany	D	Dehinde Akinlotan, Boston
Steve Trittschuh, Tampa Bay	D	-
Ronald Simmons, Albany	D	-
Ricardo Alonso, Fort Lauderdale	D	-
Tab Ramos, Miami	M	Steve Wegerle, Tampa Bay
John Harkes, Albany	M	Paul Riley, New Jersey
Michael Brady, Washington	M	Osvaldo Ardiles, Fort Lauderdale
Jean Harbor, Washington	F	Steve Kinsey, Fort Lauderdale
Phillip Gyau, Maryland	F	-
Rod Castro, Orlando	F	-
Lincoln Phillips, Maryland	Coach	-

=== Match summary ===
June 29, 1989
7:30 PM EDT

Washington Diplomats	1–2	ASL All-Stars
Suazo	Report	Gyau; Rod Castro (27:22)

RFK Stadium, Washington, D.C.
Attendance: 4,375
- All-Star game MVP: Osvaldo Ardiles

== Post-season honors ==
=== All A-League Team ===
- Goalkeeper: Neil Cowley, Winston DuBose
- Defenders: Dehinde Akinlotan, Ricardo Alonso, Eric Hawkes, Ronald Simmons, Steve Trittschuh
- Midfielders: Osvaldo Ardiles, John Harkes, Willington Ortiz, Tab Ramos, Paul Riley
- Forwards: Chico Borja, Michael Brady, John Kerr, Jr., Steve Kinsey, Steve Wegerle

== 1989 National Professional Soccer Championship ==
In anticipation of a proposed merger (which took place the following year) the ASL champions faced off against the Western Soccer League champions in the 1989 National Pro Soccer Championship on September 9 in San Jose, California's Spartan Stadium. This would be the first time since 1984 that an undisputed national champion of professional soccer was crowned in the United States.

=== Match report ===
September 9, 1989
7:30 PST

San Diego Nomads (California)	1–3	(Florida) Fort Lauderdale Strikers
Watson (73:13); Ortiz (yellow card) 86:10'	Report	Moreland (yellow card) 44:40'; Eichmann (74:24); Edwards (84:40); Carrera (89:00)

Spartan Stadium, San Jose, California
Attendance: 8,632
Referee: Levon Baladjanian

== See also ==
- 1989 Western Soccer League
- 1989 Southwest Outdoor Soccer League season
