= Rene Ortiz =

American soccer player

Personal information
- Full name: Rene Ortiz Navarro
- Date of birth: April 23, 1969 (age 57)
- Place of birth: Anaheim, California, United States
- Height: 5 ft 11 in (1.80 m)
- Position: Midfielder

Senior career*
Years	Team	Apps	(Gls)
1987–1990	San Diego Sockers (indoor)	49	(6)
1988–1989	San Diego Nomads		
1990–1994	Milwaukee Wave (indoor)	133	(92)
1993–1995	San Diego Sockers (indoor)	71	(60)
1996	Dallas Burn	2	(0)
1996–1997	Cincinnati Silverbacks (indoor)	15	(8)
1997	Monterrey La Raza (indoor)	21	(4)
2000	Arizona Thunder (indoor)	16	(5)

International career
1995	United States (futsal)	5	(1)
1996	United States (beach soccer)		

Managerial career
- 2002–: Mexico (arena)
- 2017–2019: San Diego Sockers 2
- 2020–: San Diego Sockers (assistant)
- 2021–2023: San Diego Sockers 2
- * Club domestic league appearances and goals

Rene Ortiz (born April 23, 1969) is an American former soccer player. He spent most of his playing career in indoor soccer with two seasons in the Western Soccer Alliance and one season in Major League Soccer. He currently coaches the Mexican national arena soccer team and the Hilltop High School soccer teams.

== Early years ==
Ortiz was born in Anaheim, California, and raised in Tijuana, Mexico. While in Mexico, he played for several youth clubs including Tecolatlan of the Major League of Tijuana. In 1985, he played for Atletico Tijuana in the Mexican Third Division. He returned to the United States as a teenager and attended Southwest Senior High School in San Diego, California for one year. He played one season of high school soccer in 1987. He led the Raiders to a South Bay League title and an appearance in the CIF San Diego Section quarterfinals, as well as a 14–3–4 overall record. He was named the South Bay League Player of the Year, as well as a first-team All-San Diego Section Division 2A honoree. He scored 38 goals, which was the ninth-highest single-season total in San Diego Section history, including 29 goals in 13 league games.

== Playing career ==
=== Club career ===
On July 29, 1987, Ortiz signed with the San Diego Sockers of the Major Indoor Soccer League (MISL). He was initially assigned to their reserve squad, the Auto Trader Reserves, leading them to a National Amateur Indoor Championship title in February 1988. He was named the tournament's most valuable player after scoring eight goals in six games. Consequently, Ortiz was called up to the senior squad the following month, joining the team for the remainder of the 1987–88 MISL season. He made his professional debut for the Sockers on March 15, recording an assist in their 4–3 double-overtime win over the Wichita Wings. Ortiz scored his first MISL goal two days later, during a 9–7 win over the Kansas City Comets. He played three indoor winter seasons with the Sockers, winning three consecutive MISL championships. During this time, he also appeared for the San Diego Nomads of the outdoor Western Soccer Alliance during the summers of 1988 and 1989, winning the WSA championship in 1989. He also played in the nationally televised 1989 National Pro Soccer Championship against the American Soccer League (ASL) champion Fort Lauderdale Strikers.

In 1990, Ortiz moved to the Milwaukee Wave in the National Professional Soccer League (NPSL). In 1993, the Sockers moved to a new league, the Continental Indoor Soccer League which played a summer indoor schedule. At the end of the 1992–1993 NPSL season, Ortiz signed with the Sockers for the 1993 CISL season, returning to the Wave for the 1993–1994 NPSL season. He was named to the NPSL All-Star Game as a replacement for an injured Kim Røntved. Ortiz returned to the Sockers for the 1994 and 1995 seasons.

In February 1996, Ortiz was selected by the Dallas Burn in the seventh round (63rd overall) in the 1996 MLS Inaugural Player Draft. In 1996, he was loaned for the winter to the Cincinnati Silverbacks of the NPSL where he sustained a serious knee injury. In 1997, after being placed on waivers by the Burn, he played for the Monterrey La Raza in the CISL. The CISL collapsed at the end of the season and Ortiz moved to the Arizona Thunder of the World Indoor Soccer League. He retired when the Thunder folded in 2000.

=== National team career ===
In 1995, Ortiz earned five caps, scoring one goal, with the United States national futsal team as the team took fourth place at the Futsal Mundialito. In 1996, he played for the United States national beach soccer team which finished fourth at the 1996 Beach Soccer World Cup.

== Coaching career ==
Soon after beginning his playing career, Ortiz returned to his alma mater, Southwest Senior High School in San Diego, as an assistant soccer coach. In 1992, he was hired to coach the Germantown High School girls soccer team in Germantown, Wisconsin. In 1994 and 1995, he was an assistant coach with Southwest Senior High School. In 1995, he became a staff coach with the Bonita Rebels youth soccer club in Bonita, California. He remained on the Bonita Rebels staff for ten years. From 1998 to 2000, he was an assistant coach at El Cajon Valley High School. In 2001, he moved to Marian Catholic High School in San Diego, California, a position he held until 2003. He led Marian to a San Diego Section Division IV title in 2002. He was head coach of the Express Diesel, a Mexican indoor soccer team in Baja. He also coached the Monterrey La Raza in the MASL in 2009 and Atletico Baja in 2016–17. He is also the head coach of the Hilltop High School boys and girls soccer teams. He led the girls' team to a South Bay League title in 2018–19, which they shared with Mater Dei (formerly known as Marian). In 2021–22, he led the team to a South Bay League title and an appearance in the San Diego Section Division IV championship game.

In 2017, Ortiz was hired as an assistant coach of the third version of the San Diego Sockers in the Major Arena Soccer League (MASL).

Ortiz was also named the head coach of the Sockers' reserve team, the San Diego Sockers 2 of the Major Arena Soccer League 2 (M2). In 2018–19, he led the team to an undefeated 12–0 record in the regular season and league title. He was named the M2 Coach of the Year. After a two-year hiatus, the Sockers2 returned in 2021 and reinstalled Ortiz as head coach. He led the team to a second M2 league title after compiling a 11–1 regular-season record and was named the M2 Coach of the Year.

=== National team ===
Ortiz has coached the Mexico national arena soccer team since 2002. The team finished as runner-ups at the 2015 WMF World Cup, losing to the United States in the final.

Ortiz led Mexico to another runner-up finish at the 2017 WMF World Cup held in Tunisia, losing to the Czech Republic in the final. He finally guided Mexico to a gold medal at the 2019 WMF World Cup in Australia, where they defeated Brazil, 4–0, in the championship game.

== Personal life ==
Ortiz gained his bachelor's degree in kinesiology from San Diego State University in 2005. He also taught physical education during his time as a coach at Hilltop High School.

Ortiz married his wife, Monica, and the couple had two daughters: Sofia and Alyssa.

== Honours ==
=== Player ===
San Diego Sockers

- Major Indoor Soccer League: 1987–88, 1988–89, 1989–90

San Diego Nomads

- Western Soccer Alliance: 1989

Individual

- National Professional Soccer League All-Star: 1993–94

=== Coach ===
San Diego Sockers 2

- Major Arena Soccer League 2: 2018–19, 2021–22

Individual

- Major Arena Soccer League 2 Coach of the Year: 2018–19, 2021–22
