= 1989 Orlando Lions season =

Orlando Lions
1989 season
- American Soccer League: Southern Division: Fourth place
- Average home league attendance: 2,761

The 1988 Orlando Lions season was the second season of the team in the new American Soccer League. This year, the team finished in fourth place in the Southern Division of the league. They did not make the playoffs.

== League standings ==
Southern Division
Pos	Team	Pld	W	PKW	PKL	L	GF	GA	GD	Pts
1	Tampa Bay Rowdies	20	9	3	2	6	32	25	+7	35
2	Fort Lauderdale Strikers	20	10	2	1	7	33	25	+8	35
3	Washington Diplomats	20	8	3	3	6	32	26	+6	33
4	Orlando Lions	20	9	0	3	8	25	20	+5	30
5	Miami Sharks	20	1	2	2	15	20	51	−31	9
