= Osvaldo Ardiles =

Argentine association football player and manager

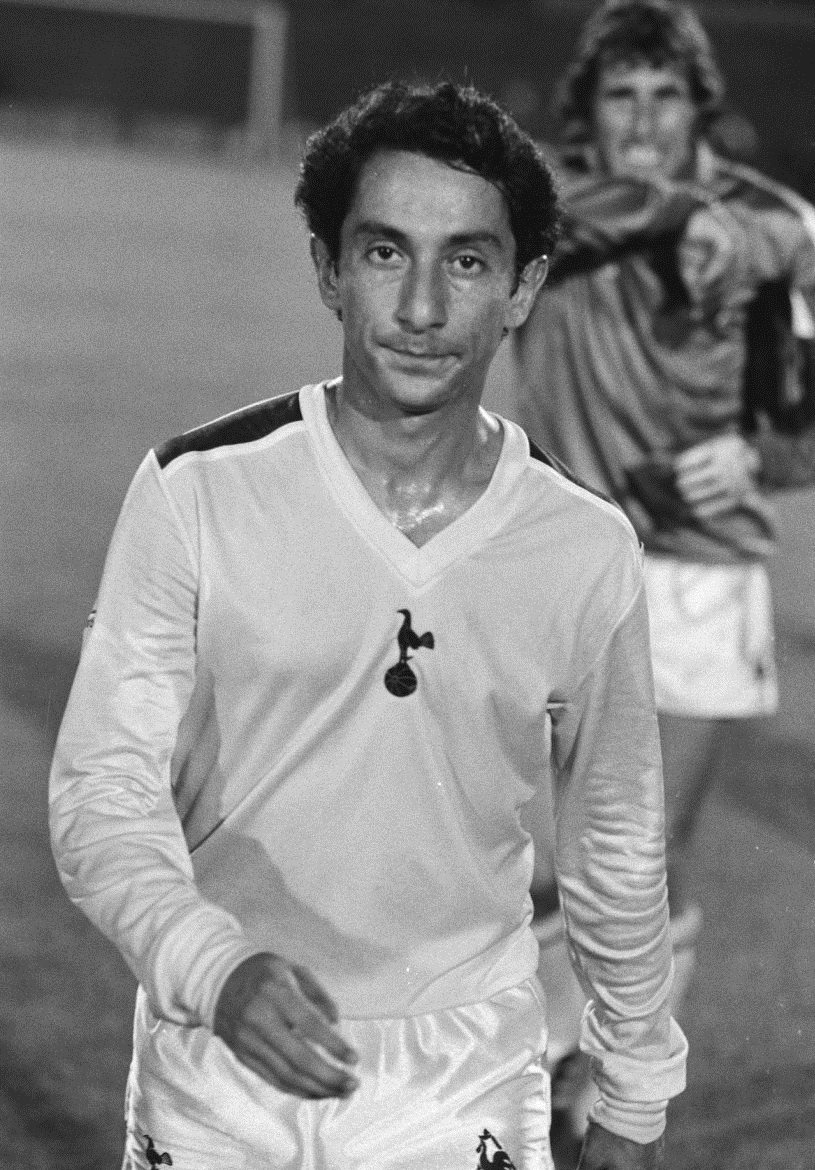
- Ardiles with Tottenham Hotspur in 1981

Personal information
- Full name: Osvaldo César Ardiles
- Date of birth: 3 August 1952 (age 74)
- Place of birth: Córdoba, Argentina
- Height: 1.70 m (5 ft 7 in)
- Position: Central midfielder

Youth career
- Instituto

Senior career*
Years	Team	Apps	(Gls)
1973	Instituto	14	(3)
1974	Belgrano	16	(2)
1975–1978	Huracán	109	(11)
1978–1988	Tottenham Hotspur	238	(16)
1982–1983	→ Paris Saint-Germain (loan)	14	(1)
1985	→ St George Budapest (loan)	1	(0)
1988	Blackburn Rovers	5	(0)
1988–1989	Queens Park Rangers	8	(0)
1989	Fort Lauderdale Strikers	5	(1)
1989–1991	Swindon Town	2	(0)
Total		412	(34)

International career
1975–1982	Argentina	51	(8)

Managerial career
- 1989–1991: Swindon Town
- 1991–1992: Newcastle United
- 1992–1993: West Bromwich Albion
- 1993–1994: Tottenham Hotspur
- 1995: Guadalajara
- 1996–1998: Shimizu S-Pulse
- 1999: Croatia Zagreb
- 2000–2001: Yokohama F. Marinos
- 2001: Al-Ittihad
- 2002–2003: Racing Club
- 2003–2005: Tokyo Verdy
- 2006: Beitar Jerusalem
- 2007: Huracán
- 2008: Cerro Porteño
- 2012: Machida Zelvia
Medal record
Men's football
Representing Argentina
FIFA World Cup
Winner	1978 Argentina
- * Club domestic league appearances and goals

Osvaldo César "Ossie" Ardiles (born 3 August 1952) is an Argentine football manager, pundit and former player.

A competitive and skilled midfielder, Ardiles became a cult hero in England, along with Glenn Hoddle and compatriot Ricardo Villa, as a player for Tottenham Hotspur. He left England for a period on loan as a result of the outbreak of the Falklands War in 1982, thus missing most of the 1982–83 English season. He won the 1978 FIFA World Cup as part of the Argentina national team.

After retirement, Ardiles began his management career in England, coaching Swindon Town, Newcastle United and West Bromwich Albion, before returning to Tottenham to become the first Premier League manager from Argentina. As manager of Tottenham Hotspur in the mid-1990s, he played several matches utilizing a formation that had five forwards, a formation that had not been used in English football since the 1900s.

During his career, Ardiles has also coached in Mexico, Croatia, Japan, Syria, Saudi Arabia, Malaysia, Israel, Paraguay and his native Argentina. In Ireland, he is a pundit for RTÉ Sport.

== Club career ==
Ardiles was born in Córdoba, and played for Instituto de Córdoba from a young age. As a youngster, Ardiles played football in the streets and was given the nickname Pitón (python) by his brother because of his snake-like dribbling skills. He was named as El Gráfico's best player of the interior in 1974, and abandoned his law degree studies in order to play professional football.

He also played for Club Atlético Belgrano and Huracán. After the 1978 World Cup he moved to England to play for Tottenham Hotspur where he spent ten seasons.

He helped Tottenham win the FA Cup in his third season there (1980–81), and collaborated with pop duo Chas & Dave as well as the rest of the Tottenham players for a song, "Ossie's Dream". He played a big part in another FA Cup triumph the following year, but did not play in the final because it had already been arranged with Spurs’ management that he would leave early to join up with Argentina's 1982 World Cup squad.

In the wake of the Falklands War between Britain and Argentina it became difficult for him to return to White Hart Lane and he went on loan to Paris Saint-Germain in France. After one season in Paris, he returned to Tottenham, helping the club to win the UEFA Cup in 1984 (coming on as a substitute in the second leg of the final). In the autumn of 1987, he was caretaker coach under caretaker manager Doug Livermore of Tottenham between the resignation of David Pleat and the appointment of Terry Venables. Ardiles left Spurs in 1988. He then played for Blackburn Rovers, Queens Park Rangers and Swindon Town, before being appointed as manager of Swindon Town in July 1989. He played part of the 1989 American Soccer League season with the Fort Lauderdale Strikers.

On 7 February 2008, Ardiles, along with his fellow countryman Ricardo Villa, was inducted into the Tottenham Hotspur Hall of Fame.

== International career ==
Ardiles was called up to the Argentina senior team by manager César Luis Menotti in 1975. He was a member of the World Cup winning squad in 1978. At the 1982 World Cup he wore the number 1 shirt, as Argentina's policy at the time was to number their players alphabetically by surname, with an exception made so Diego Maradona could wear his preferred number 10.

== Management career ==
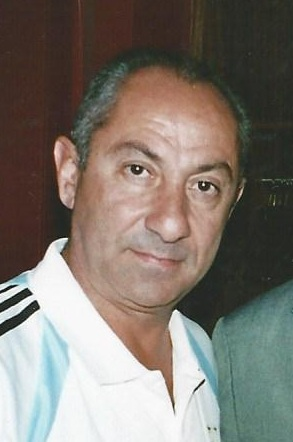
Ardiles in 2006

In July 1989, Ardiles moved into football management with second division Swindon Town when Lou Macari resigned to join West Ham in July 1989. He wowed fans by replacing the long ball style which had been so successful with a new "Samba style", which saw the Town playing attacking football. Part of this change was the new "diamond formation" which Ardiles implemented: a 4–4–2 style with left-sided, right-sided, attacking and defensive midfielders.

Ten months after he had joined, Ardiles led Swindon to their highest ever league position, finishing fourth in the second division. After beating Blackburn in the first leg of the play-off semi-final, the fans paid tribute with a tickertape reception in the second leg. Swindon went on to win promotion to the top flight for the first time in their history—beating Sunderland in the Play-off final—only to have the promotion taken from them ten days later, when the Football League demoted them for irregular payments to players.

The following season, Ardiles was told to sell players to keep the club alive and Wembley hero Alan McLoughlin was the first big-money departure. With Swindon rocked by their pre-season troubles, their form deserted them. By the end of February, relegation threatened, and when Newcastle offered Ardiles the chance to become their new boss, he accepted, becoming the club's first foreign manager. But his time on Tyneside was not a success and he lasted 12 months in the job before being sacked, with the Magpies bottom of the second division, though they achieved safety under his successor Kevin Keegan.

In June 1992, Ardiles replaced Bobby Gould as manager of West Bromwich Albion, who had just missed out on the third division playoffs in 1991–92. At the end of the 1992–93 season, Ardiles guided Albion to victory over Port Vale in the Division Two playoff final. Shortly afterwards he walked out of the Hawthorns to return his former club Tottenham as manager, but his management spell was nowhere near as successful as his spell as a player. Tottenham finished 15th in the Premiership and despite the expensive acquisition of Jürgen Klinsmann and Ilie Dumitrescu in the 1994 close season, Ardiles was sacked in October 1994 with Tottenham languishing in the bottom half of the Premier League. They had just been punished for financial irregularities committed during the late 1980s: with a 1-year FA Cup ban, £600,000 fine and 12 league points deducted. The punishment was later amended to a £1.5million fine and six points deducted but the FA Cup ban and points deduction were later quashed.

Ardiles became coach of J. League Division 1 side Yokohama F. Marinos in January 2000, but was sacked in June 2001, following a poor start to the season. From 2003 to 2005 he coached Tokyo Verdy, with whom he won the 2004 Emperor's Cup, In July 2005 Ardiles was fired after a nine-game winless streak. In mid-2006, he moved to Israel to coach Beitar Jerusalem, though he quit after only a few months in charge on 18 October 2006, due to severe differences of opinion with the club's board of directors. After a short break he was appointed Club Atlético Huracán manager, in his native Argentina, in September 2007; he steered the club to 7th in the table before resigning at the end of the Apertura 2007.

He joined Paraguayan club Cerro Porteño in May 2008 but was sacked in August of the same year after a string of poor results and was replaced by Pedro Troglio.

== Media career ==
Ardiles was enlisted by RTÉ Sport for their squad of pundits ahead of the 2010 FIFA World Cup in South Africa. He returned to RTÉ's team for the 2014 FIFA World Cup in Brazil.

Ardiles played Carlos Rey in the 1981 World War II film Escape to Victory.

== Personal life ==
He married fellow Argentine Silvia Navarro in December 1973. Ardiles' cousin, José, was shot down and killed while piloting an IAI Dagger, the Israeli version of the Mirage 5, by Sea Harrier XZ455 on 1 May 1982 during one of the first air engagements of the Falklands War.

Ardiles son, Pablo, was at one time a player and manager of Hertford Town.

In January 2014, Ardiles and Ricardo Villa were involved in a car crash in the Falkland Islands during the filming of Camilo Antolini's 30 for 30 documentary White, Blue and White. Ardiles sustained minor injuries in the accident, and required more than 20 stitches in his head.

== Career statistics ==
=== Club ===
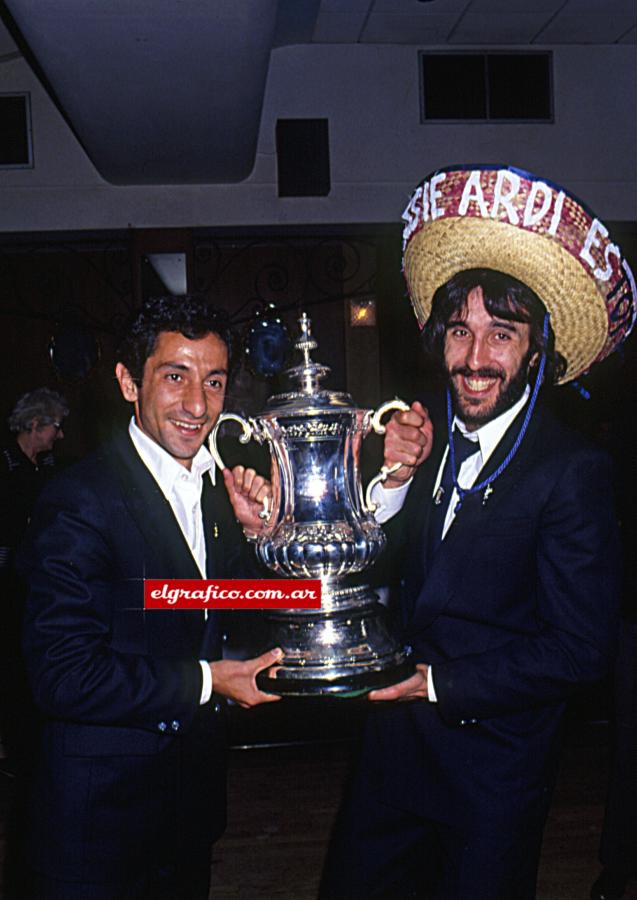
Ardiles with teammate Ricardo Villa posing with the FA Cup trophy, May 1981

Appearances and goals by club, season and competition
Club	Season	League			National Cup		League Cup		Continental		Total	
Club	Season	Division	Apps	Goals	Apps	Goals	Apps	Goals	Apps	Goals	Apps	Goals
Instituto	1973	Argentine Primera División	14	3								
Belgrano	1974	Argentine Primera División	16	2								
Huracán	1975	Argentine Primera División	16	0								
Huracán	1976	Argentine Primera División	41	7								
Huracán	1977	Argentine Primera División	52	4								
Huracán	1978	Argentine Primera División										
Huracán	Total		109	11								
Tottenham Hotspur	1978–79	First Division	38	3								
Tottenham Hotspur	1979–80	First Division	40	3								
Tottenham Hotspur	1980–81	First Division	36	5								
Tottenham Hotspur	1981–82	First Division	26	2								
Tottenham Hotspur	1982–83	First Division	2	0								
Tottenham Hotspur	1983–84	First Division	9	0								
Tottenham Hotspur	1984–85	First Division	11	2								
Tottenham Hotspur	1985–86	First Division	23	1								
Tottenham Hotspur	1986–87	First Division	25	0								
Tottenham Hotspur	1987–88	First Division	28	0								
Tottenham Hotspur	Total		238	16								
Paris Saint-Germain (loan)	1982–83	Division 1	14	1					3			
St George FC (loan)	1985	National Soccer League	1	0								
Blackburn Rovers	1987–88	Second Division	5	0								
Queens Park Rangers	1988–89	First Division	8	0								
Fort Lauderdale Strikers	1989	American Soccer League	5	1								
Swindon Town	1989–90	Second Division	2	0								
Swindon Town	1990–91	Second Division	0	0								
Swindon Town	Total		2	0								
Career total			412	34								

=== International ===
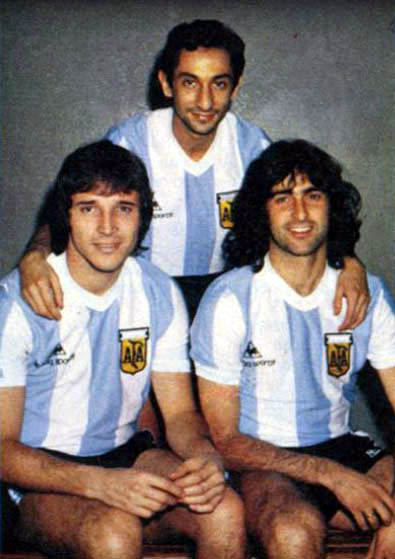
Ardiles (center) with Daniel Bertoni (left) and Mario Kempes (right) in 1981

Appearances and goals by national team and year
National team	Year	Apps	Goals
Argentina	1975	8	4
Argentina	1976	9	1
Argentina	1977	11	0
Argentina	1978	12	2
Argentina	1979	1	0
Argentina	1981	2	0
Argentina	1982	8	1
Total		51	8

== Managerial statistics ==
Team	Nat	From	To	Record				
Team	Nat	From	To	G	W	D	L	Win %
Swindon Town	(England)	1989	1991	95	32	33	30	33.68
Newcastle United	(England)	1991	1992	52	12	18	22	23.08
West Bromwich Albion	(England)	1992	1993	55	30	11	14	54.55
Tottenham Hotspur	(England)	1993	1994	56	17	14	25	30.36
Guadalajara	(Mexico)	1995	1995	19	7	7	5	36.84
Shimizu S-Pulse	(Japan)	1996	1998	124	72	7	45	58.06
Croatia Zagreb	(Croatia)	1999	1999	19	9	5	5	47.37
Yokohama F. Marinos	(Japan)	2000	2001	40	21	2	17	52.50
Racing Club	(Argentina)	2002	2003	59	25	16	18	42.37
Tokyo Verdy	(Japan)	2003	2005	67	22	20	25	32.84
Beitar Jerusalem	(Israel)	2006	2006	7	3	2	2	42.86
Huracán	(Argentina)	2007	2007	12	5	4	3	41.67
FC Machida Zelvia	(Japan)	2012	2012	42	7	11	24	16.67
Total				642	257	150	235	40.03

== Honours ==
=== Player ===
Huracán

- Primera División runner-up: 1976

Tottenham Hotspur

- FA Cup: 1980–81; runner-up: 1986–87
- FA Charity Shield: 1981 (shared)
- UEFA Cup: 1983–84
- Football League Cup runner-up: 1981–82

Argentina

- FIFA World Cup: 1978

Individual

- World Soccer World 11: 1978, 1982, 1983
- Football League 100 Legends list (as the only Argentinian)
- PFA Team of the Year: 1978–79 First Division
- Tottenham Hotspur Hall of Fame
- English Football Hall of Fame: 2009
- Golden Foot: 2013
- IFFHS Argentina All Times Dream Team: 2021

=== Manager ===
Swindon Town

- Football League Second Division play-offs: 1990

West Bromwich Albion

- Football League Second Division play-offs: 1993

Shimizu S-Pulse

- J.League Cup: 1996

Tokyo Verdy

- Emperor's Cup: 2004

Individual

- J. League Manager of the Year: 1998
