= Jeff Duback =

American soccer player

Personal information
- Full name: Jeffrey Duback
- Date of birth: January 5, 1964 (age 62)
- Place of birth: United States
- Height: 6 ft 3 in (1.91 m)
- Position: Goalkeeper

Youth career
- San Diego Nomads

College career
Years	Team	Apps	(Gls)
1982, 1984–1986	Yale Bulldogs		

Senior career*
Years	Team	Apps	(Gls)
1986	San Diego Nomads		
1987–1988	San Diego Sockers (indoor)	0	(0)
1988	Boston Bolts		
1989	San Diego Nomads		
1990	Boston Bolts		
1993	Tampa Bay Rowdies	2	(0)
1994–1995	Charlotte Eagles		

International career
1987–1989	United States	4	(0)

Managerial career
- 2004–2005: Woodlawn School
- * Club domestic league appearances and goals

Jeff Duback is a retired U.S. soccer goalkeeper who played in the Western Soccer Alliance, American Soccer League and American Professional Soccer League. He also earned four caps with the United States men's national soccer team.

== Youth ==
Duback grew up in the San Diego, California, area, where he played for the powerhouse San Diego Nomads youth club. After graduating from La Jolla High School, Duback attended Yale University, where he played on the men's soccer team in 1982. He spent the 1983 season with the U.S. U-20 national team before returning to Yale the next season. He remained with the team through 1986. He holds several Yale records, including season GAA (.31 in 1986) and career GAA (.82) . He also hold the school's record for season shutouts (11) and career shutouts (25). He was named a first-team All-American goalkeeper in 1984 and 1986. He topped this with garnering the ISAA Goalkeeper of the Year in 1986.

== Professional career ==
In 1986, Duback returned to San Diego to play during the collegiate off season for the Nomads' senior team, which competed at that time in the Western Soccer Alliance (WSA). He graduated from Yale in the spring of 1987 and spent that summer with the national team. In the fall of 1987, he broke his toe training with the Kansas City Comets during the Major Indoor Soccer League preseason. He returned to San Diego where he trained with the San Diego Sockers while recuperating. The Sockers signed him for the 1987–1988 MISL season, but he never saw first team time. In 1988, Duback played with the Boston Bolts of the American Soccer League (ASL). However, he lost most of the season due to national team commitments. In 1989, the Bolt decided against bringing him back for a second season and he signed with the San Diego Nomads. He once again saw only a handful of games with his team as he spent most of the summer with the national team. He returned to the Nomads late in the season as the team won the league title, putting it in the first national championship game since the demise of the North American Soccer League in 1984. Duback started the game against the Fort Lauderdale Strikers which the Nomads lost 3–1. By the spring of 1990, Duback was out of contention for a spot on the national team and he signed with the Boston Bolts now of the American Professional Soccer League. Duback played with the Bolts the entire season. Duback retired at the end of the season and went into the sporting goods business. In the spring of 1993, he went on trial with the Tampa Bay Rowdies of the APSL. The Rowdies signed him to a short-term contract on May 13, 1993, as backup to starter Bill Andracki and second string keeper Brett Philips. However, with Andracki suspended and Phillips injured, Duback started the first game of the season and posted a shutout. This led the Rowdies to extend his contract. However, the team released him on June 2, 1993, when Duback did not agree to the terms of another contract extension. In 1994, he signed with the Charlotte Eagles of the USISL. He played two seasons with the Eagles. On June 6, 1995, Duback signed with Major League Soccer as that league began preparations to begin its first season in 1996. However, he was not drafted and retired permanently in the spring of 1996.

== National team ==
In 1983, Duback was the starting goalkeep for the U.S. U-20 national team as it qualified for the 1983 FIFA World Youth Championship in Mexico. He played all three games in the tournament, gaining a single win and single shutout.

In 1987, he earned his first cap with the national team becoming only one of four national team goalkeepers to earn a shutout in their debut game. Previous to this game, David Vanole had been the keeper of choice through 1986 and 1987. In 1988, the national team began searching for another keeper and Duback was in the mix. However, by 1989, Vanole had staged a resurgence and Tony Meola was entering the goalkeeping scene, which he would dominate through 1994. This led to Duback earning only three more caps, despite his excellent start with the national team. In his four games, he earned only one victory and two shutouts. Duback was also a member of the 1988 U.S. Olympic team which went 0-1-2 at the games.

== Coaching ==
He currently runs goalkeeper camps and markets a goalkeeper video. He served as a volunteer coach at his children's school, Woodlawn of Davidson, North Carolina, during the 2004–2005 season. 2009 assistant coach for the Women's Professional Soccer League's (WPSL) Boston Aztec.
