= Brian McManus =

Brian McManus may refer to:

- Brian McManus (footballer) (fl. 1960s–2000s), Scottish former football player
- Brian McManus (YouTuber) (fl. 2000s–2020s), Irish engineering YouTuber known for the Real Engineering and Real Science channels
