= Ross Irwin =

Ross Irwin may refer to:

- Roscoe James Irwin (born 1982), Australian musician
- Ross Irwin (soccer) (born 1960), former professional soccer player from Scotland
