= San Diego Sockers =

San Diego Sockers may refer to:

- San Diego Sockers (1978–1996), a soccer team in the North American Soccer League
- San Diego Sockers (2001–2004), a soccer team in the World Indoor Soccer League and second Major Indoor Soccer League
- San Diego Sockers (2009), an American professional indoor soccer franchise
  - San Diego Sockers 2 (2017), an American professional indoor soccer team

== See also ==
- Chicago Sockers, a soccer team in the Premier Development League
