= Brian McManus (footballer) =

Scottish former soccer player and USA-based soccer coach

Brian Sheeran McManus
Personal information
- Place of birth: Scotland
- Position: Midfielder

Senior career*
| Years | Team | Apps | (Gls) |
| | Aberdeen | 0 | (0) |
| 1969–1970 | Raith Rovers | 1 | (0) |
| 1970–1972 | Fleetwood | 93 | (14) |
| 1980 | Fleetwood Town | 15 | (1) |
| 1986 | San Diego Nomads | | |
| 1989 | San Diego Nomads | | |
| 1990 | Portland Timbers | | |

Managerial career
- 1980: Fleetwood Town
- Torrey Pines High School
- 1986: UC San Diego (assistant)
- 1987–2017: UC San Diego
- 1988: San Diego Nomads
- 1989: San Diego Nomads (assistant)
- * Club domestic league appearances and goals

Brian McManus is a Scottish former football midfielder who is currently a Director of Coaching for the Nomads Soccer Club and the former head coach of the UC San Diego women's soccer team. He is a four-time NCAA Coach of the Year and has led UC San Diego to seven national championships. He also played in Scotland, one season in the Western Soccer Alliance and one in the American Professional Soccer League.

== Playing ==
McManus played professionally in Scotland for Raith Rovers and Aberdeen F.C. before moving to England to play for Fleetwood F.C. and Barrow A.F.C amongst other north west England non-league teams. He emigrated to the San Diego in the United States in 1980. In 1986, he played for the San Diego Nomads of the Western Soccer Alliance, and again in 1989. In 1990, he was with the Portland Timbers of the American Professional Soccer League. During these years, he was establishing himself as one of the top women's collegiate soccer coaches in the nation.

== Coaching ==
McManus began his coaching career when he became player-manager at Fleetwood Town F.C. for the 1980–81 season. He left his position late in 1980 however to follow a new opportunity in the United States offered to him by Derek Armstrong. According to his biography, he coached semi-pro soccer in Los Angeles, but there is no mention of a team, league or relevant years. At some point in his career he coached the Torrey Pines High School boys' team. In 1986, UC San Diego hired McManus as an assistant with its women's soccer team. In 1987, he became the head coach, a position he holds to this day. When McManus took on responsibility for the Tritons, they played at the Division III level. From 1986 until 1999, the Tritons won five Division III championships (1989, 1995, 1996, 1997, 1999). During those years, McManus was a three-time NCAA coach of the year. In 2000, the Tritons moved up to Division II. McManus and his team quickly proved themselves, winning two consecutive national championships (2000, 2001) while McManus was the 2001 Division II Coach of the Year. He was also listed as the semi-pro San Diego Nomads head coach at the beginning of the 1988 season, when Derek Armstrong was their Director of Operations. The following year during the Nomads WSL championship run, he was listed as a player/coach, with Armstrong as the head coach.

== See also ==
- List of college women's soccer coaches with 300 wins
