= Manuel Rojas (footballer) =

Chilean footballer (born 1954)

Manny Rojas
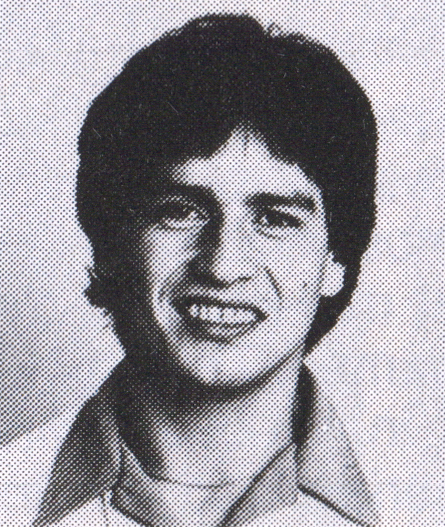
- Rojas circa 1984

Personal information
- Full name: Manuel Antonio Rojas Zúñiga
- Date of birth: June 13, 1954 (age 72)
- Place of birth: Santiago, Chile
- Position: Midfielder

Senior career*
Years	Team	Apps	(Gls)
1971–1975	Palestino		
1975–1976	América	20	(2)
1981–1982	Universidad Católica		
1983	Tampa Bay Rowdies	29	(8)
1983–1984	Tampa Bay Rowdies (indoor)	25	(13)
1984	Golden Bay Earthquakes	10	(3)
1984	Chicago Sting	11	(1)
1984–1988	Chicago Sting (indoor)	163	(70)
1988	Tampa Bay Rowdies		
1988–1991	Chicago Power (indoor)		

International career
1976–1982	Chile	29	(2)

Managerial career
- Chicago Power (assistant)
- 2012: Chicago Soul
- * Club domestic league appearances and goals

Manuel Antonio "Manny" Rojas Zúñiga (born 13 June 1954) is a retired football midfielder from Chile who played for its national team at the 1982 FIFA World Cup in Spain. Afterwards, he spent two seasons in the North American Soccer League, four in the Major Indoor Soccer League, three in the American Indoor Soccer Association and one in the American Soccer League.

== Playing ==
Rojas began his professional club with Chilean First Division club Palestino. He then moved to Mexican Club América for the 1975 season. At some point, he signed with Universidad Católica of Chile and was on their roster for the 1981–82 season.

In 1983, he moved to the United States where he signed with the Tampa Bay Rowdies of the North American Soccer League (NASL). He scored eight goals in twenty-nine games that season to lead the team in scoring. On 23 March 1984, the Rowdies released Rojas and he signed a few days later with the Golden Bay Earthquakes. However, on 10 July 1984, the Earthquakes sent Rojas and Hayden Knight to the Chicago Sting in exchange for Ricardo Alonso and Charlie Fajkus. Rojas found himself with a team on the rise as the Sting won the 1984 NASL championship. While he scored only one goal during the regular season, he added two more in the post-season, including one in a 2–1 victory over the Toronto Blizzard in the first game of the championship series.

When the NASL folded at the end of the 1984 NASL season, the Sting moved to the Major Indoor Soccer League (MISL). Rojas remained with the Sting until it folded at the end of the 1987–1988 MISL season. That summer, he rejoined the Rowdies, who were then playing in the American Soccer League then signed with the expansion Chicago Power of the American Indoor Soccer Association. Rojas remained with the Power through the 1990–91 season, scoring seven goals in twenty-one games as the Power won the AISA championship.

== National team ==
Rojas' career with the Chilean national team spanned from 1976 to 1982. He capped his national team career when he was selected to play for Chile, which competed at the 1982 FIFA World Cup in Spain. He was awarded the Chilean National Sportsmanship Award 1978 and 1981.

== Coaching ==
Rojas has extensive coaching experience, most of it at the youth level. He acted as an assistant coach while with the Chicago Power. He has also been an assistant coach for both the Libertyville and Vernon Hills high school soccer teams. On September 25, 2012, he was named the head coach of the Chicago Soul in the MISL, but was fired on December 2, 2012 after the team went 2–7. He is now coaching at FC 1974 in Libertyville with U10-U14 teams.

== Personal life ==
Rojas is the brother-in-law of the Chilean former footballer Guido Coppa.
