= Ross Irwin (soccer) =

Scottish footballer (born 1960)

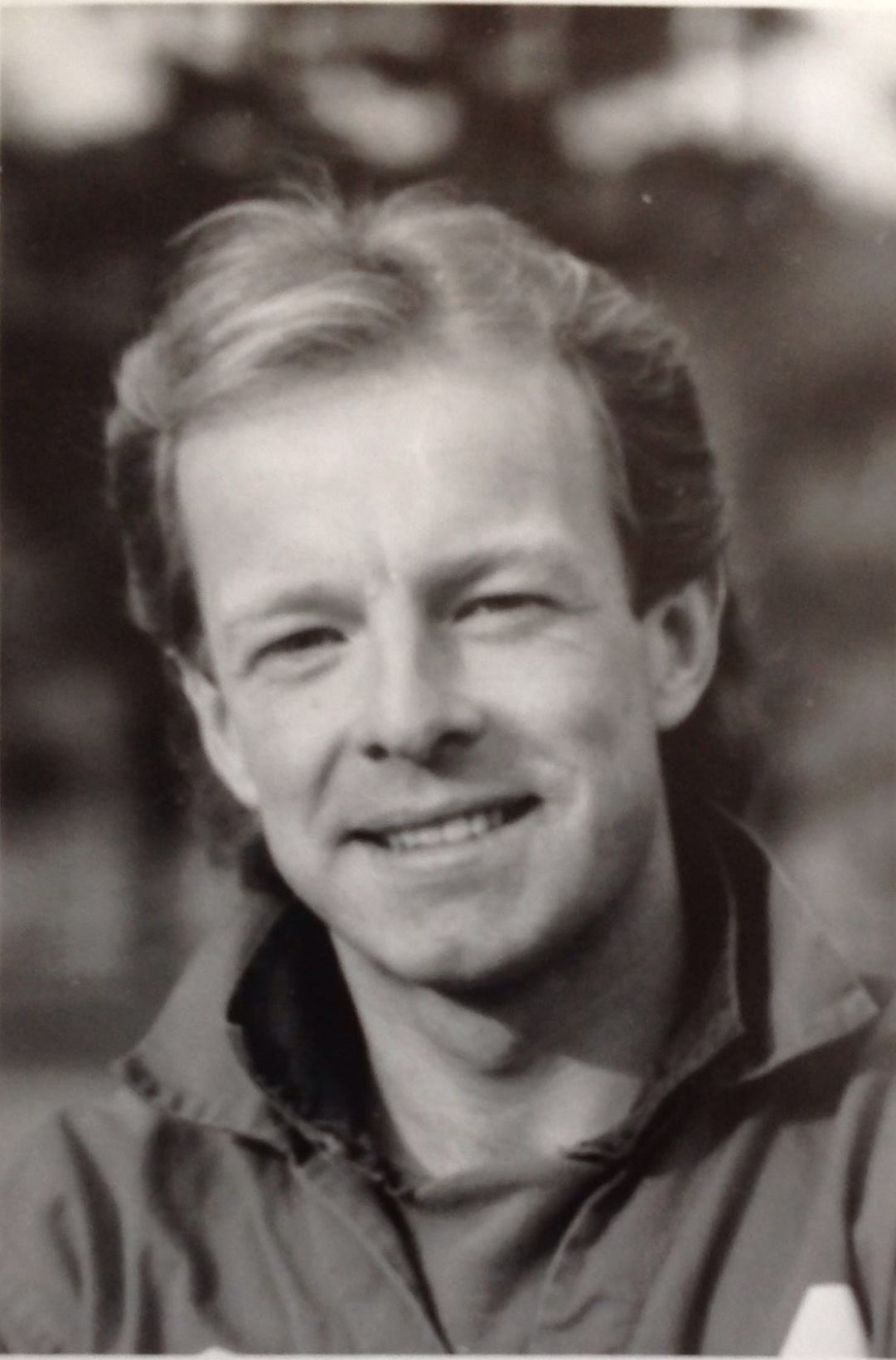
Irwin with Boston Bolts in 1988

Ross J. Irwin (born 9 May 1960) is a Scottish former professional footballer. He played for Fareham Town (England), FC Stade Nyonnais (Switzerland), the Bahama Royals (Bahamas) and the Boston Bolts and Albany Capitals of the American Soccer League.

== Career ==
Irwin graduated from Carnegie College, Leeds University, England.

He played for Swiss club FC Stade Nyonnais from 1982 to 1984.

He had the distinction of being the first player to be signed by the Boston Bolts franchise as one of their three foreign players. In 1988 at Nickerson Field, Boston University, Irwin scored the winning goal for the Boston Bolts against the Orlando Lions by converting a penalty kick against fellow Scotsman and Orlando goalkeeper Alan Rough in extra time. This was the team's first home game of the season and their first win following three defeats.

During the 1988–89 season as sweeper and vice captain of the Boston Bolts, Irwin was selected as the only Boston player to the American Soccer League (ASL) All Star Team. He was one of two Scotsmen on the All Star team, being joined by former Scotland national team goalkeeper Alan Rough. The All Star team played against the Fort Lauderdale Strikers at Lockhart Stadium in Fort Lauderdale, Florida, with George Best making a guest appearance for the Strikers.

In 1989, following Irwin's selection to the ASL All Star team, he was signed by the Albany Capitals as one of their two foreign players. He joined US national team players John Harkes, Brian Bliss and Mike Windischmann, and former England international Paul Mariner.
