= Mirko Castillo =

Peruvian soccer forward (born 1962)

Personal information
- Date of birth: August 30, 1962 (age 64)
- Place of birth: Lima, Lima Province, Peru
- Height: 5 ft 8 in (1.73 m)
- Position: Forward

Youth career
- Alianza Lima

Senior career*
Years	Team	Apps	(Gls)
1988	Fort Lauderdale Strikers		(5)
1989	Miami Sharks		(10)
1990	Tampa Bay Rowdies		
1990	Washington Diplomats		
1989	Memphis Rogues (indoor)	7	(2)
1989–1991	Chicago Power (indoor)	31	(63)
1991	Fort Lauderdale Strikers	2	(2)
1991	St. Louis Storm (indoor)	6	(3)
1991–1992	San Diego Sockers (indoor)	10	(1)
1992–1993	Chicago Power (indoor)	35	(43)
1994	Houston Hotshots (indoor)	14	(7)
1994	Chicago Power (indoor)	16	(11)
1995	Arizona Sandsharks (indoor)	25	(23)
1995–1996	Detroit Rockers (indoor)	14	(7)
1996	Seattle SeaDogs (indoor)	8	(9)
1996–1997	Indiana Twisters (indoor)	33	(48)
1997–1998	Baltimore Spirit (indoor)	6	(3)
1998–1999	Montreal Impact (indoor)	6	(0)
1999	Houston Hotshots (indoor)	4	(0)
1999–2000	St. Louis Ambush (indoor)	3	(0)
- * Club domestic league appearances and goals

Mirko Castillo (born August 30, 1962) is a Peruvian footballer who played as a forward, spending his entire professional career in the United States. He played two seasons in the American Soccer League, tying Ricardo Alonso as the 1990 league leading scorer. He then played two seasons in the American Professional Soccer League and over a dozen years playing in five indoor leagues.

== Outdoor ==
Although Castillo began playing soccer in Peru, including time on the Alianza Lima youth teams, he moved to the United States in 1988 to sign with the Fort Lauderdale Strikers of the American Soccer League. In 1989, he moved to the Miami Sharks where he tied Ricardo Alonso as the league's leading scorer with ten goals. However, he finished second to Alonso in the points standings. In 1990, the ASL merged with the Western Soccer League to form the American Professional Soccer League. That summer, Castillo played for both the Tampa Bay Rowdies and the Washington Diplomats in the APSL. In the summer of 1991, he returned to the Fort Lauderdale Strikers, but played only two games with the team.

== Indoor ==
Castillo began his indoor soccer career with the Memphis Rogues of the National Professional Soccer League in 1989. The Rogues traded him to the Chicago Power in mid-December. He spent two seasons in Chicago before moving to the St. Louis Storm of the Major Indoor Soccer League (MISL) where he had three goals and one assist in six games. After being released by St. Louis he was signed by the San Diego Sockers on December 6, 1991. In 1992, the MISL collapsed and Castillo moved back to the Chicago Power. Castillo played the 1992–1993 season, but was released by the Power in the summer of 1993 after he engaged in several heated confrontations with head coach Pato Margetic. On January 8, 1994, the Power shuffled its coaching staff and signed Castillo for the remainder of the season. That summer, he joined the Houston Hotshots of the Continental Indoor Soccer League, a summer indoor league. He moved to the Arizona Sandsharks for the 1994 CISL season, scoring 23 goals. In the fall of 1995, he signed with the Detroit Rockers, playing the 1995–1996 NPSL season. In 1996, Castillo began the summer indoor season with the Seattle SeaDogs of the CISL, but was waived on July 25, 1996. In September, he signed with the Indiana Twisters. He played the rest of the 1996 season in Indiana and the entire 1997 CISL season there. At the end of the 1997 season, the Twisters and CISL collapsed and in September 1997 the Edmonton Drillers selected Castillo in the supplemental draft. Castillo did not sign with the Drillers, but moved to the Baltimore Spirit for the 1997–1998 season. On February 5, 1998 the Spirit waived Castillo. He then played the 1998–1999 season with the Montreal Impact in the NPSL. He was back with the Houston Hotshots in the summer of 1999. This time, the Hotshots were in the World Indoor Soccer League. That fall, he signed with the St. Louis Ambush of the NPSL, but played only three games.

== Coaching ==
Beginning in 1998, Castillo has held numerous positions as a director of coaching, coach and trainer with several youth soccer clubs in the Houston area.
