= Charlie Fajkus =

American soccer player

Personal information
- Date of birth: March 4, 1957 (age 69)
- Place of birth: Chicago, Illinois, U.S.
- Position: Midfielder

Youth career
- 1975–1979: Indiana Hoosiers

Senior career*
Years	Team	Apps	(Gls)
1979–1984	Chicago Sting	138	(18)
1980–1982	Chicago Sting (NASL indoor)	34	(16)
1982–1983	Chicago Sting (MISL)	47	(28)
1984	Golden Bay Earthquakes	13	(1)
1985–1987	Kansas City Comets (indoor)	120	(57)
1987–1988	Chicago Sting (indoor)	45	(16)
Total		397	(136)

International career
1982–1985	United States	3	(0)
- * Club domestic league appearances and goals

Charlie Fajkus (born March 4, 1957) is an American retired soccer midfielder who spent six seasons in the North American Soccer League and five in the Major Indoor Soccer League. He also earned three caps with the U.S. national team between 1982 and 1985.

== Youth and college ==
Fajkus grew up in Cicero, Illinois, a suburb of Chicago where he attended Burnham Grade School. He attended Wheaton Central High School from 1973 to 1975. In his time on the Wheaton boys soccer team, he assisted on 56 goals in 43 games which places him fourteenth on the Illinois state high school career list. As a senior, he also led the Tigers Varsity to 2nd Place in the 1974 Illinois State Soccer Tournament (IHSA), dropping the final to New Trier West 1–0 in 4 overtimes. Fajkus also played for the Sparta F.C. youth teams growing up. After graduating from high school, Fajkus attended Indiana University where he played on the men's soccer team from 1975 to 1978. During his four seasons, he scored thirty-eight goals and assisted on thirty-eight other goals while the Hoosiers went to the 1976 and 1978 NCAA championship games. Unofficially, the Hoosiers were the 1978 Champions because San Francisco later vacated the title due to the use of an ineligible player.

== NASL ==
In 1979, the Chicago Sting of the North American Soccer League (NASL) selected Fajkus in the NASL College Draft. He immediately stepped into the lineup, seeing time in nineteen games. Over the next five seasons, Fajkus was an integral part of the Sting as they went to the 1981 NASL championship. In 1984, Fajkus started the season with the Sting, but was traded on July 10, 1984, along with Ricardo Alonso to the Golden Bay Earthquakes for Manny Rojas and Hayden Knight.

== MISL ==
At the end of the 1982 NASL season, the Sting entered the Major Indoor Soccer League (MISL) during the NASL off-season. Fajkus found himself back in MISL when the Kansas City Comets purchased his contract from the Earthquakes on September 19, 1985. Fajkus signed a two-year contract and stayed with the club through the 1986–1987 season. At the end of that season, he moved back to the Chicago Sting for their last season in existence. Fajkus retired from playing professionally at the end of the season.

== National team ==
The first game came in the only U.S. game of 1982 when the U.S. beat Trinidad Tobago on March 21, 1982. He did not play again until October 6, 1984, when the U.S. defeated the Netherlands Antilles. His last game came on May 15, 1985, another victory over Trinidad Tobago.

Fajkus is a member of the Illinois Soccer Hall of Fame.
