= Thien Nguyen =

Vietnamese footballer

Personal information
- Date of birth: June 29, 1969 (age 57)
- Place of birth: Saigon, Vietnam
- Height: 5 ft 6 in (1.68 m)
- Positions: Forward; midfielder

Youth career
- 1984–1986, 1988: UC San Diego Tritons

Senior career*
| Years | Team | Apps | (Gls) |
| 1988–1990 | San Diego Nomads | | |
| 1989–1991 | San Diego Sockers (indoor) | 26 | (1) |
- * Club domestic league appearances and goals

Thien Nguyen is a Vietnamese retired footballer. He played professionally in the Western Soccer Alliance and Major Indoor Soccer League.

Born in South Vietnam, Nyguyen grew up in southern California. He graduated from Madison High School and attended UC San Diego where he played on the men's soccer team from 1984 to 1986 and again in 1988. In 1988, the Tritons went undefeated as they claimed the 1988 NCAA Men's Division III Soccer Championship. Nguyen holds the Tritons career assists record with thirty-six and is sixth on the career points list with seventy-four.

In 1988, Nguyen played for the San Diego Nomads of the Western Soccer Alliance. He continued to play for the Nomads each summer until they withdrew from the league following the 1990 season. In 1989, the Nomads won the league title before falling to the Fort Lauderdale Strikers in the national championship. In October 1989, Nguyen signed as a developmental player with the San Diego Sockers of the Major Indoor Soccer League. He played twenty-three games for the Sockers’ first team during the 1989–1990 season. The Sockers signed him again for the 1990–1991 season, but released Nguyen in November 1990 as he decided to pursue his graduate studies.
