= Hayden Knight =

Trinidadian-American footballer

Personal information
- Date of birth: March 17, 1957 (age 69)
- Place of birth: Port of Spain, Trinidad
- Height: 6 ft 1 in (1.85 m)
- Positions: Forward; defender

College career
Years	Team	Apps	(Gls)
1977–1979	Marquette Golden Eagles		

Senior career*
Years	Team	Apps	(Gls)
1980	Edmonton Drillers	8	(1)
1980–1981	Edmonton Drillers (indoor)	18	(9)
1981	Atlanta Chiefs	9	(0)
1981–1982	Montreal Manic (indoor)	18	(2)
1982	Montreal Manic	30	(4)
1983	Team America	16	(2)
1984	Golden Bay Earthquakes	2	(0)
1984	Chicago Sting	10	(1)
1984–1985	Chicago Sting (indoor)	31	(7)
1985–1986	Chicago Shoccers (indoor)	28	(19)
1986	Chicago Sting (indoor)	15	(3)
1986–1987	Dallas Sidekicks (indoor)	53	(8)
1987–1988	Chicago Power (indoor)		
1988–1989	Milwaukee Wave (indoor)	27	(14)

International career
1984	United States	3	(0)

Managerial career
- 1989–2005: Cedarburg High School (girls)
- 1989–2008: Cedarburg High School (boys)
- * Club domestic league appearances and goals

Hayden Knight (born March 15, 1957, in Port of Spain, Trinidad) is a retired Trinidad-American soccer defender and current high school soccer coach. He earned three caps with the United States men's national soccer team in 1984.

== Playing career ==
=== Youth ===
Knight, a native of Trinidad, moved to the United States with his family when he was a young boy. He grew up in Brooklyn, New York. When he was a sophomore, Knight attended high school in Appleton, Wisconsin, as part of a program known as 'A Better Chance'. This program placed inner-city youths in rural high schools. He attended Marquette University where he played on the men's soccer team. He holds the team's career scoring record with 52 goals. He also holds the NCAA record for career assists per game with 42 in 44 games. Marquette inducted Knight into the school's Athletic Hall of Fame. In college, he also played with the Milwaukee Bavarians.

Knight is one of 22 college players to be part of the 40-40 club, having both 40 goals and 40 assists in their college career.

=== Professional ===
In 1980, the Edmonton Drillers drafted Knight. Although he starred in college as a forward, he moved to defense in the pros. He played a single season with the Drillers before moving to the Atlanta Chiefs. While with the Drillers, he received his first taste of indoor soccer when the Drillers won the 1980-1981 NASL indoor championship. The Chiefs folded after the 1981 season and Knight moved north to the Montreal Manic for the 1982 season.

In 1983, the U.S. Soccer Federation, in coordination with the NASL, entered the U.S. national team, known as Team America, into the NASL as a league franchise. The team drew on U.S. citizens playing in the NASL, Major Indoor Soccer League and American Soccer League. Knight left the Manic and signed with Team America. When Team America finished the 1983 season with a 10–20 record, the worst in the NASL, USSF withdrew the team from the league. Knight moved to the Golden Bay Earthquakes for the 1984 season, but was traded to the Chicago Sting with Manny Rojas on July 10, 1984, in exchange for Ricardo Alonso and Charlie Fajkus. He remained with the Sting through the 1984-1985 MISL season and won the 1984 NASL championship with them. On May 10, 1985, the Sting released Knight. In September 1985, Knight signed with the Chicago Shoccers of the American Indoor Soccer Association. He was an AISA All Star and led the Shoccers in scoring despite playing defense. In March 1986, he rejoined the Sting and finished the 1985-1986 MISL season with them. On August 6, 1986, he signed with the Dallas Sidekicks of the Major Indoor Soccer League (MISL)as a free agent. On July 4, 1987, the team announced that they would not renew his contract and he again became a free agent. He signed with the Milwaukee Wave of the American Indoor Soccer Association (AISA) where he played as a forward for the next two seasons. At the end of the 1987-1989 AISA season, Knight retired from playing professionally.

=== National team ===
In 1984, Knight earned three caps with the U.S. national team. The three games all came within a week as Knight played first on October 11 in a win over Colombia, followed by a loss three days later to Guatemala and another loss three days after that to Mexico.

== Coaching ==
That year Cedarburg High School in Cedarburg, Wisconsin, hired Knight to coach the girls' soccer team as well as teach. Since then, Knight has remained at Cedarburg, teaching history and social studies as well as coaching both the girls' and boys' teams. In 2005, he resigned from the girls' team, after beating prostate cancer, but resigned later from the boys' side in 2008 to take a technical directing job at the Mequon Soccer Club. The CHS won the state championships in 1989, 1991 and 1996. He is also a staff coach at the Mequon Soccer Club. He is looking for his 300th win, then possibly retiring from soccer.
