= Pedro Magallanes =

Argentine footballer

Personal information
- Full name: Pedro Remigio Magallanes
- Date of birth: June 14, 1956 (age 70)
- Place of birth: Argentina
- Position: Midfielder

Senior career*
Years	Team	Apps	(Gls)
- Independiente
- Rosario Central
- Talleres de Córdoba
- Argentinos Juniors
- Racing Club
- Loma Negra
1988	Hamilton Steelers	7	(0)
1988	→ Vancouver 86ers (loan)	0	(0)
1989–1991	Fort Lauderdale Strikers		

Managerial career
- Tampa Bay Mutiny (assistant)
- * Club domestic league appearances and goals

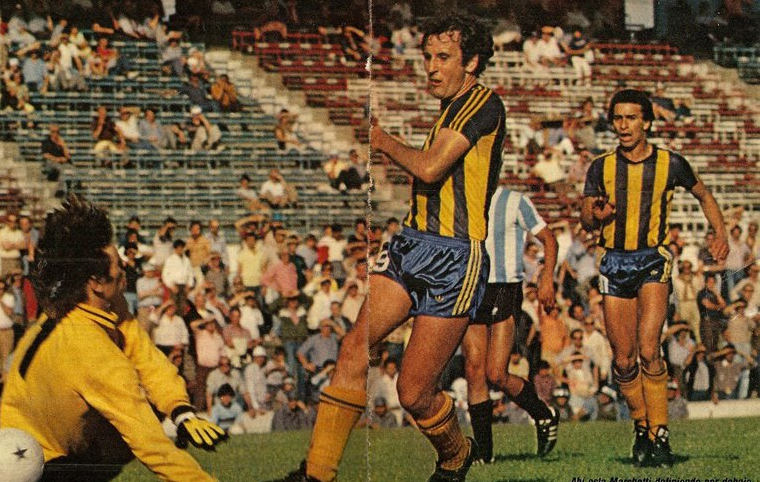

Pedro Magallanes (born June 14, 1956) is a retired Argentine football (soccer) midfielder who played professionally in Argentina and the United States.

Magallanes had an extensive career in Argentina. He played the 1978–1979 season with Independiente and he has also played for Rosario Central and Talleres de Córdoba. He played for Argentinos Juniors during the 1980–1981 season. He also played for Racing Club and Loma Negra. In 1988, he moved north to the USA where he had an unsuccessful trial with the San Diego Sockers of the Major Indoor Soccer League. However, he joined the Hamilton Steelers of the Canadian Soccer League. In July 1988, the Steelers loaned Magallanes to the Vancouver 86ers. In May 1989, the Fort Lauderdale Strikers of the American Soccer League signed Magallanes. On June 17, 1989, Jean Harbor struck Magallanes in the face, breaking his cheekbone during a game between the Strikers and the Washington Diplomats. In 1997, Magallanes served briefly as an assistant coach with the Tampa Bay Mutiny of Major League Soccer and then coached for the soccer club Classic SC.
