= 2018–19 Major Arena Soccer League 2 season =

Major Arena Soccer League 2
- Season: 2018–19
- Champions: San Diego Sockers 2
- Matches: 90
- Goals: 1,354 (15.04 per match)
- Top goalscorer: Jaime Rodriguez (41)
- Longest winning run: 12 Games: San Diego Sockers 2 (entire season)
- Longest losing run: 9 Games: Muskegon Risers (1/5/19–3/9/19)
- All statistics correct as of March 30, 2019.

The 2018–19 Major Arena Soccer League 2 season is the second season for the league M2. The regular season started on December 1, 2018, and ended on March 16, 2019. For the second year in a row, each team played a 12-game schedule. This season, the M2 expanded from 10 to 15 teams.

== Changes from 2017–18 ==
Expansion

- Arizona Lightning (Avondale)
- Cuervos de Juarez (El Paso/Juarez)
- New Mexico Elite (Santa Fe)
- New Mexico Runners (Rio Rancho)
- Rochester Lancers
- Stockton Rush

Name Change

- Colorado Blizzard FC to Colorado Rumble FC

On Hiatus

- Arizona Impact (Glendale)

== Standings ==
As of March 16, 2019
2018-19 League Championship
2018-19 Playoff Team
(Bold) Division Winner

Place	Team	GP	W	L	Pct	GF	GA	GB
Eastern Division
1	Chicago Mustangs	12	10	2	.833	92	62	—
2	Rochester Lancers	12	8	4	.667	100	64	2
3	Waza Flo	12	7	5	.583	58	70	3
4	Cincinnati Swerve	12	4	8	.333	75	82	4
5	Muskegon Risers	12	1	11	.083	72	119	9
Mountain Division
1	Cuervos de Juarez	12	10	2	.822	116	72	—
2	Colorado Inferno F.C.	12	9	3	.750	134	98	1
3	New Mexico Runners	12	4	8	.333	105	141	6
4	Colorado Rumble FC	12	4	8	.333	94	111	6
5	New Mexico Elite	12	3	9	.250	99	126	7
Pacific Division
1	San Diego Sockers 2	12	12	0	1.000	132	36	—
2	Las Vegas Knights SC	12	8	4	.667	112	80	4
3	Arizona Lightning	12	4	8	.333	55	85	8
4	Ontario Fury II	12	4	8	.333	70	106	8
5	Stockton Rush	12	2	10	.167	40	102	10

== 2019 M2 Championship ==
The team with the best record gets a bye in the Quarter-Finals. The top two teams in the other divisions plus the third place team in the division having the top seed qualifies for the post-season. All playoff rounds will be a single elimination matches.

Quarter-Finals

March 17, 2019
12:00 PM MDT
Mountain

Cuervos de Juarez	13–6	Colorado Inferno F.C.
	Report

El Paso County Coliseum
El Paso, Texas
March 21, 2019
7:00 PM CDT
Eastern

Chicago Mustangs	3–4 (OT)	Rochester Lancers
	Report

Grand Sports Arena
Hoffman Estates, Illinois
March 24, 2018
2:30 PM PDT
Pacific

Las Vegas Knights SC	2–1	Arizona Lightning
	Report

Las Vegas Sports Park
Las Vegas, Nevada

Semi-Finals

March 29, 2019
1:00 PM PDT

Cuervos de Juarez	11–10	Rochester Lancers
	Report

Upland Sports Arena
Ontario, California
March 29, 2019
3:30 PM PDT

San Diego Sockers 2	12–3	Las Vegas Knights SC
	Report

Upland Sports Arena
Ontario, California

3rd Place Game

March 30, 2019
12:30 PM PDT

Rochester Lancers	8–7	Las Vegas Knights SC
	Report

Citizens Business Bank Arena
Ontario, California

Final

March 30, 2019
2:30 PM PDT

San Diego Sockers 2	7–5	Cuervos de Juarez
	Report

Citizens Business Bank Arena
Ontario, California

== Awards ==
=== Individual awards ===
Award	Name	Team
League MVP	Jaime Rodriguez	New Mexico Runners
Goalkeeper of the Year	Yair Aguilar	San Diego Sockers 2
Defender of the Year	Ryan Ybarra	Chicago Mustangs
Coach of the Year	Rene Ortiz	San Diego Sockers 2

=== All-League First Team ===
Name	Position	Team
Jaime Rodriguez	F	New Mexico Runners
Boomer Steigelman	F/M	Rochester Lancers
Robert Garcia	M	Las Vegas Knights SC
Jake Schindler	D	Rochester Lancers
Ryan Ybarra	D	Chicago Mustangs
Yair Aguilar	GK	San Diego Sockers 2

=== All-League Second Team ===
Name	Position	Team
Thomas Hoang	F	Colorado Inferno F.C.
Emmanuel Mendoza	F/M	Cuervos de Juarez
Sean Callahan	M	San Diego Sockers 2
Alex Moseley	D	Colorado Inferno F.C.
Ismael Rojo	D	San Diego Sockers 2
Nate Steinwascher	GK	Waza Flo
