= Derek Armstrong (footballer) =

English footballer

Personal information
- Full name: Derek James Armstrong
- Date of birth: 16 March 1939 (age 87)
- Place of birth: Carlisle, England
- Position: Inside left

Senior career*
Years	Team	Apps	(Gls)
1958–1959	Blackpool	1	(0)
1959–1960	Blackpool F.C.		
1962	Carlisle United	1	(0)
1966–1971	Fleetwood	247	(71)
1971–19??	Lancaster City		

Managerial career
- 1968–1971: Fleetwood
- 1974–1976: Lancaster City
- 1983–2007: UC San Diego Tritons
- 1987: San Diego Nomads
- 1987: United States U20
- 1989: San Diego Nomads
- * Club domestic league appearances and goals

Derek James Armstrong (born 16 March 1939) is an English former professional footballer and current Director of Coaching of the San Diego Nomads. He played as an inside-left, including Football League appearances for both Blackpool and Carlisle United.

== Managerial and coaching career ==
Derek joined Fleetwood F.C., then in the Lancashire Combination for the 1966–67 season and he became player-manager in Fleetwood's inaugural 1968–69 season in the Northern Premier League. He was there for 5 seasons and left after winning the Northern Premier League Cup beating Wigan Athletic in the semi-final, and Macclesfield Town in the final. He had coaching/manager positions with Chorley F.C., Netherfield A.F.C., Blackpool Mechanics, and Lancaster City before joining Allan Brown at Blackpool FC in the 1975–76 season as reserve coach. In 1979 he was moved to first-team coach for eight games when Jimmy Meadows had a short spell as manager before returning to coaching the reserves again when Bobby Collins joined the staff. In 1980 he worked for Notts County F.C. for a season, scouting upcoming opponents for the championships season in which Notts County were promoted to Div 1.

In the United States, he became an assistant coach with Columbus Magic in Ohio in 1980, before moving to Nomads Soccer Club in La Jolla California in 1981. He became the first paid youth soccer coach in the United States when he joined the staff of the La Jolla Nomads. In 1986, Armstrong helped to found the San Diego Nomads in the new Western Soccer Alliance. The Nomads won the Western Soccer Alliance titles in 1987 and 1989. They were also runners-up to Fort Lauderdale Strikers in the 1989 National Professional Championship. In 2001 the Nomads were asked to manage the San Diego Flash franchise in the A-league by the league, the side under Armstrong reaching the play-offs. He continues to work for the Nomads, currently as director of coaching and board member.

=== College soccer ===
He also coached the UC San Diego (UCSD) men's soccer team from 1983 to 2007, during which time the Tritons won three national titles. In the fifth game of the 2007 season, he coached his 500th game with UCSD. Prior to taking over as coach in 1983, the Tritons had had only one season with more wins than defeats in their seven-year history. Armstrong transformed the side to the extent that the first season with more defeats than wins under his tenure did not come until the 2001 season. His cumulative record of 326–138–48 makes him the winningest coach in UCSD history. He retired as Tritons coach in September 2007. Derek was inducted into the UCSD hall of fame in 2017. With the advent of the US Soccer Academy starting that season he decided to retire . Also contributing to his retirement from UCSD was the fact he had an impending knee operation which could not be put off

=== United States U20 ===
In 1987 Armstrong coached the United States under-20 side in the World Youth Championship (now known as the FIFA U-20 World Cup) in Chile. Derek holds the unique distinction of being the first USA coach to beat Mexico at the World Cup level. They knocked off Mexico, 3–0, in the 1987 CONCACAF tournament in Trinidad. The team qualified for the World Cup in Chile.

=== US club soccer ===
He was one of the founding members and chairman of US Club Soccer in its early years, he retired from this position in January 2009. United States Soccer ACADEMY. Derek served on the formation committee in 2007 representing youth clubs across the United States.
