= Troy Edwards (soccer) =

American soccer player and coach

Personal information
- Date of birth: January 21, 1964 (age 62)
- Place of birth: Coral Gables, Florida, United States
- Height: 6 ft 0 in (1.83 m)
- Position: Defender

Youth career
- 1982–1983: Miami-Dade Community College
- 1984–1985: Florida International

Senior career*
Years	Team	Apps	(Gls)
1988	Miami Sharks		
1989–1993	Fort Lauderdale Strikers		
1992–1993	Canton Invaders (indoor)	37	(11)
1994	Carolina Vipers (indoor)	19	(3)
1995	Myrtle Beach Boyz		
1996	Colorado Rapids	4	(0)
- Rockford Thunder indoor

Managerial career
- 1996–2001: Barry University (assistant)
- * Club domestic league appearances and goals

Troy Edwards (born January 21, 1964, in Coral Gables, Florida) is a retired U.S. soccer defender who played professionally in several U.S. leagues including one season in Major League Soccer. He was a member of two college championship teams and one runner up and in 1989 scored the winning goal in the Fort Lauderdale Strikers national championship victory over the San Diego Nomads.

== Player ==
=== High school and college ===
Edwards grew up in Miami, Florida. He played soccer at Miami Killian High School where he was an All-Dade County player. In 1982, he entered Miami-Dade Community College, playing on the men's soccer team in 1982 and 1983. In 1983, the Miami-Dade won the National Junior College National Championship, defeating Forest Park Community College. He then transferred to Florida International University for the 1984 and 1985 seasons. FIU won the 1984 NCAA Division II Soccer Championship over Seattle Pacific University with Edwards scoring a golden goal in overtime, and were runners-up in 1985.

=== Professional ===
It appears he began his professional career in 1988 when he signed with the Miami Sharks of the newly established American Soccer League. That season, he was a first team All Star. The next season, he joined the Fort Lauderdale Strikers. That year, the Strikers won the ASL title, putting them in the first national championship game played since the demise of the North American Soccer League in 1984. The Strikers met the San Diego Nomads of the Western Soccer League, coming from behind to win 3–1 with Edwards scoring the winning Strikers goal. He played for the Strikers through the 1993 season. In addition to playing the summer outdoor season with the Strikers, Edwards played in 2 indoor winter seasons, 1991–1993, with the Rockford Thunder & Canton Invaders in the National Professional Soccer League.

In 1994, he played for the Carolina Vipers in the Continental Indoor Soccer League, then spent the 1995 season with the Myrtle Beach Boyz in the USISL where he was named Defender of the Year for the league. On February 6, 1996, the Colorado Rapids selected Edwards in the fifth round (forty-second overall) in the 1996 MLS Inaugural Player Draft. Member of US National team pool 1990–1995. He played only four games for the Rapids, suffering an upper thigh injury and having groin surgery. He retired from playing professionally at the end of the season.

== Coach ==
In 1996, Edwards became an assistant coach at Barry University, a position he held until 2001. In that time Barry played in 3 NCAA tournaments finishing 2nd (runner up) in 2000. He also served as a physical education teacher and the athletic director of Holy Family Catholic School in North Miami, Florida. Troy holds a USSF B License and Youth National coaching badges. Director of coaching North Port Fusion FC 2012–2019.
