= Marcelo Carrera =

Argentine footballer (born 1962)

Personal information
- Full name: Marcelo Ariel Carrera
- Date of birth: 1 October 1962 (age 64)
- Place of birth: Buenos Aires, Argentina
- Height: 5 ft 6 in (1.68 m)
- Position: Striker

Senior career*
Years	Team	Apps	(Gls)
1983–1986	Independiente		
1986–1987	El Porvenir		
1987–1989	New York Express (indoor)	15	(5)
1988–1990	Canton Invaders (indoor)		
1988–1991	Fort Lauderdale Strikers		
1991	Dallas Sidekicks (indoor)	43	(12)
1991	Tampa Bay Rowdies	15	(3)
1992	Talleres	17	(0)
1993	Chicago Power(indoor)	37	(20)
1993–1994	Fort Lauderdale Strikers	17	(2)
1995	Canton Invaders (indoor)	109	(120)
1996	Buffalo Blizzard (indoor)	7	(3)
1995–1996	New York Centaurs	17	(3)
1997–1998	Columbus Crew	66	(8)
1998–1999	→ Cleveland Crunch (loan – indoor)	19	(18)
1999–2000	St. Louis Ambush (indoor)	35	(22)

Managerial career
- 2000: Columbus Crew (assistant)
- * Club domestic league appearances and goals

Marcelo Carrera (born 1 October 1962) is an Argentine retired footballer who played both indoor and outdoor soccer in the United States for the nearly a dozen teams.

== Player ==
Carrera began his professional career when he signed with Once Unidos at the age of fifteen. In 1986, he signed with the New York Express, an expansion team in Major Indoor Soccer League. The Express withdrew from the league after 26 games and folded during the season. He then moved to the Canton Invaders in the American Indoor Soccer Association. He played two seasons with the Invaders. In 1988 played the summer outdoor season with the Fort Lauderdale Strikers of the American Soccer League. He played three seasons with the Strikers; the 1990 season in the American Professional Soccer League. He signed with the Dallas Sidekicks in the fall of 1990. Carrera played only one season with the Sidekicks. In 1991, he moved to the Tampa Bay Rowdies in the APSL. In 1992, he signed with the Chicago Power in the National Professional Soccer League. He moved to the Canton Invaders in 1993 and remained with the team until traded to the Buffalo Blizzard at the end of the 1995–1996 season. In addition to playing the indoor winter seasons in the NPSL, Carrera returned to outdoor soccer in 1993 with the Strikers and the New York Centaurs in the A-League in 1995. In February 1996, the Columbus Crew selected Carrera in the 10th round (91st overall) in the 1996 MLS Inaugural Player Draft. On November 12, 1997, he signed on loan with the Cleveland Crunch, playing nineteen games. He also played the 1999–2000 season with the St. Louis Ambush.

== Coach ==
In 1999, he became an assistant coach with Hoban High School in Akron, Ohio. He held that position until 2000. In 2000, he returned to the Crew as an assistant coach for one season. From 2000 to 2008, he was a staff coach with Boca United S.C. in Canton, Ohio. In 2006, he was named as a coach of the Canton Crusaders of the American Indoor Soccer League. However, the Crusaders never played a game.
