= Nickerson Field =

Outdoor athletic stadium in Boston, Massachusetts

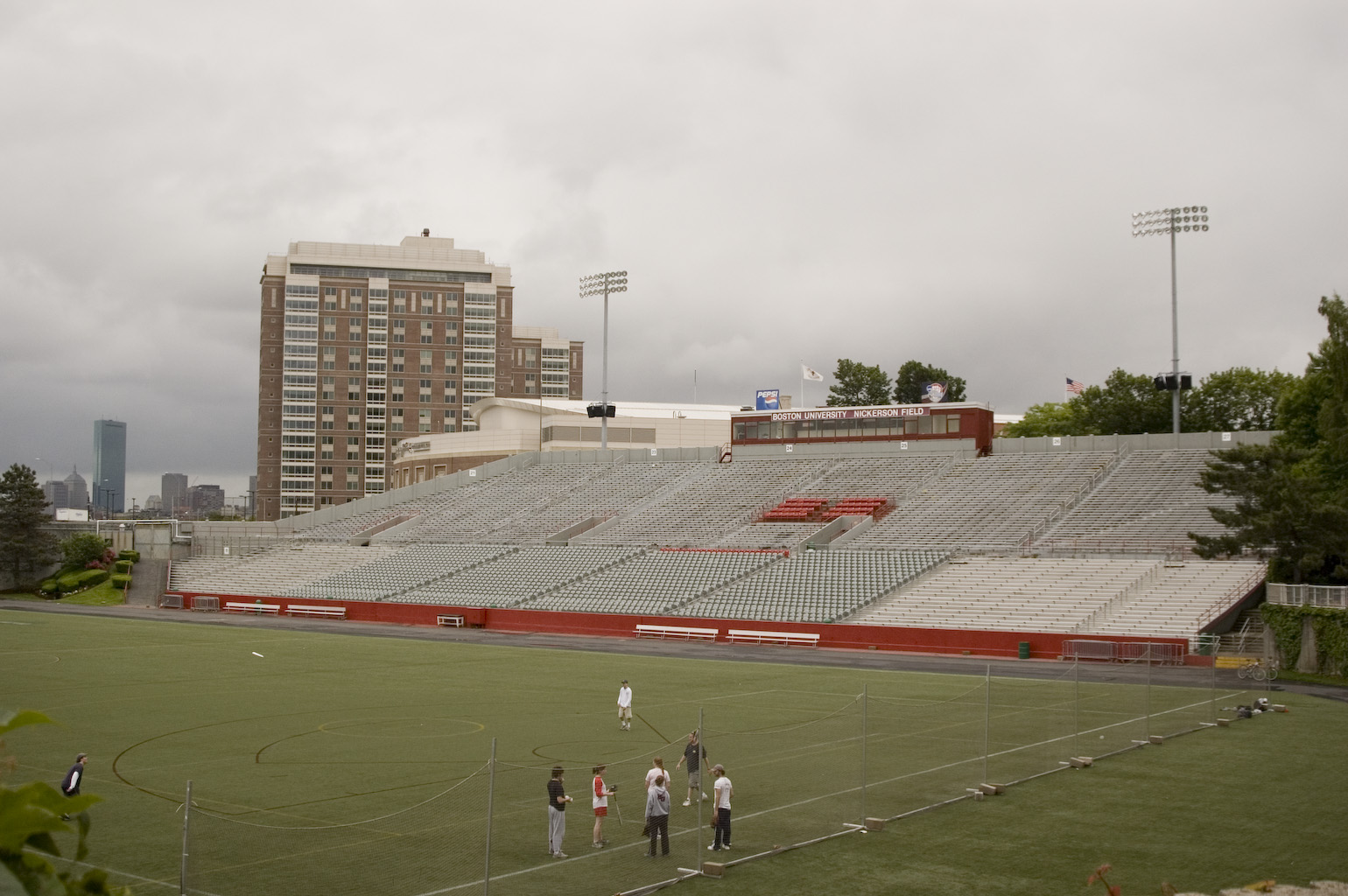
- The stadium in 2006
- Interactive map of Nickerson Field
- Former names: Boston University Field (1954–1963)
- Address: 285 Babcock Street
- Location: Boston, Massachusetts
- Coordinates: 42.353°N 71.119°W
- Owner: Boston University
- Operator: Boston University Athletics
- Capacity: 9,871
- Surface: List: GreenFields MX Trimension (2015–present); FieldTurf (2001–2015); AstroTurf (1968–2000); Natural grass (1955–1967)
- Field size: 86 × 134 yards (78.6 × 122.5 m)
- Current use: Soccer; Lacrosse; Rugby league
- Public transit: Green Line at Babcock Street

Construction
- Groundbreaking: March 20, 1915
- Opened: August 18, 1915; 111 years ago
- Renovated: 1955

Tenant
- List: Boston University Terriers (NCAA) teams: men's and women's soccer (1953–present); men's and women's lacrosse; Professional teams: Boston Patriots (AFL) (1960–1962); Boston Astros (ASL) (1974–1975); Boston Minutemen (NASL) (1975); New England Tea Men (NASL) (1979); Boston Breakers (USFL) (1983); Boston Bolts (ASL/APSL) (1988–1990); Boston Breakers (WUSA) (2001–2003); Boston Cannons (MLL) (2004–2006); Boston Bears (ANRL/USARL) (2009–present)

Website
- goterriers.com/nickerson-field

Nickerson Field is an outdoor athletic stadium in Boston, Massachusetts, on the campus of Boston University (BU). The stadium is owned by BU, and is the home field for some Boston University Terriers athletics programs, including soccer and lacrosse. It was also the home of the Boston University Terriers football team until the program was discontinued following the 1997 season.

The stadium is located on the site of Braves Field, the former home ballpark of the Boston Braves, a major league baseball team in the National League; the franchise relocated to Milwaukee in March 1953, and relocated again in 1966, becoming the Atlanta Braves. Parts of Braves Field, such as the entry gate and right field pavilion, remain as portions of the current stadium. The old Braves Field ticket office at Harry Agganis Way also remains, now used by the Boston University Police Department as headquarters complete with a cellblock. The stadium has been the home of BU teams longer (50-plus years) than it was the home of the Braves (parts of 38 seasons).

The field is named for William Emery Nickerson (1853–1930), a partner of King C. Gillette during the early years of the Gillette Safety Razor Company.

== History ==
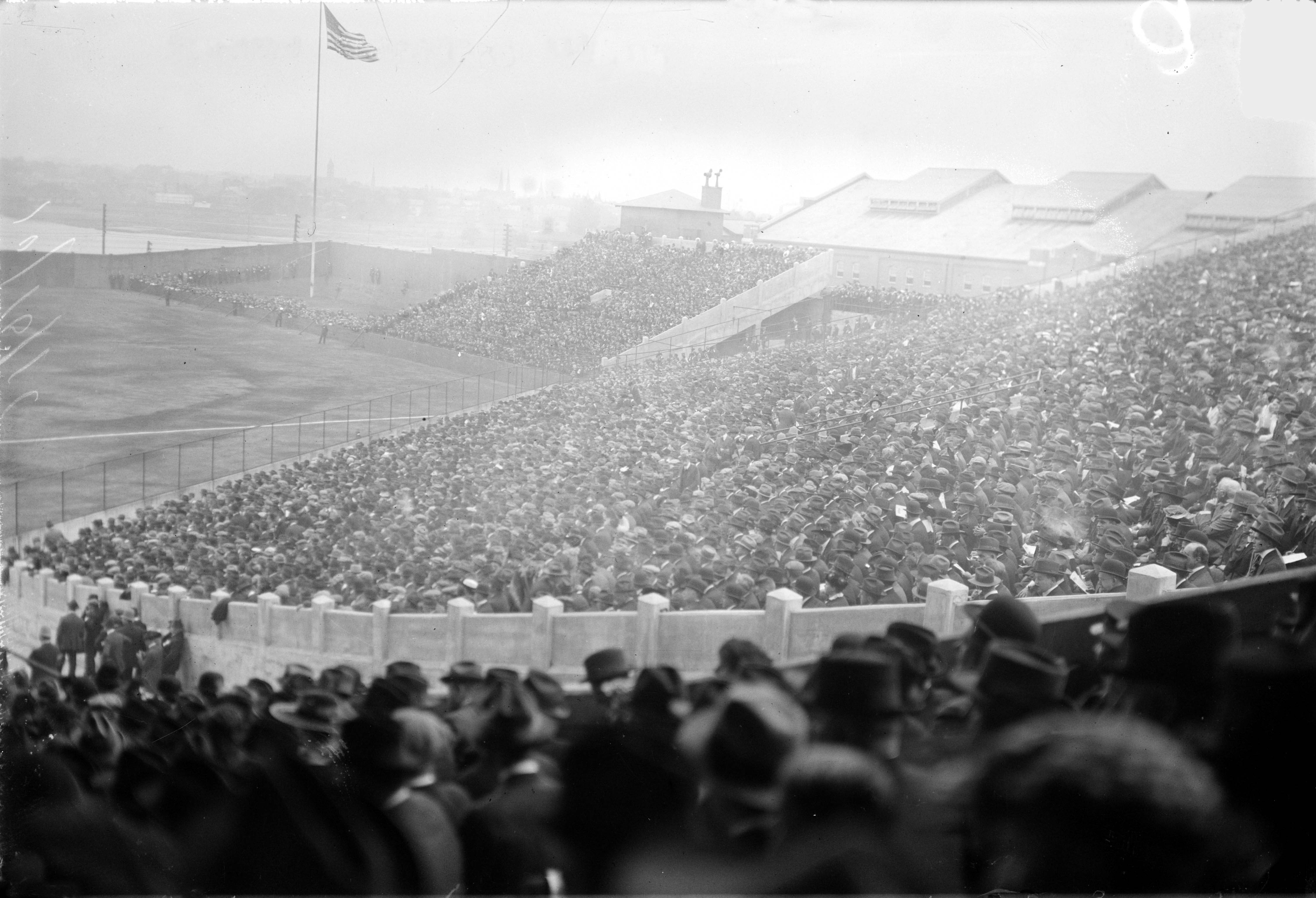
Braves Field during a baseball game in 1916

The university's previous athletic field was in the town of Weston. That field had been named for Nickerson, a member of the BU board of trustees who had donated funds for the facilities in Weston in 1926. Nickerson "was an MIT graduate who was the principal inventor of the machinery used to manufacture the first Gillette safety razor." The first Nickerson Field was dedicated on October 6, 1928, with a game against the New Hampshire Wildcats.

BU purchased the former home of the Boston Braves on July 30, 1953, and in April 1954 renamed it "Boston University Field". In 1955, the left field pavilion and the "Jury Box" were demolished and in November, 1959, the grandstand was taken down to make room for three high rise dormitories that were completed in 1964. The existing right field pavilion was squared off on the west side and filled in on the east side where a section had been removed to accommodate the Braves Field right field foul pole and bullpens. The three dormitories overlooking the field coincidentally suggest the outline of the original main grandstand section.

In February 1956, BU was awarded $391,000 for the Weston field, which had been taken by eminent domain for construction of Massachusetts Route 128. BU used the proceeds, in part, to renovate the former baseball park, and on September 28, 1963, renamed it "Nickerson Field", inheriting the name of the prior field in Weston.

In 1968, the field underwent a renovation. The four Braves Field light towers were dismantled. That year, BU became the second college in the United States to install AstroTurf. The following year, not only did the BU football team practice on that field, so did the Boston College Eagles football team and the Boston Patriots. Both used the field to prepare for away games they would play on AstroTurf fields.

During the 1983 season, Nickerson Field was the home field of the Boston Breakers of the United States Football League. From the mid-1980s to 1995, the stadium hosted the New England Scholastic Band Association's marching band field show championships. In 1989, to accommodate commencement speakers U.S. President George H. W. Bush and French President François Mitterrand, a large platform was constructed to Secret Service specifications on one side of the field. In 2001, the antiquated turf was replaced with a newer, more player-friendly artificial surface (FieldTurf) as part of a deal with the Women's United Soccer Association to host the Boston Breakers games. With a professional soccer team playing at Nickerson the football lines, which had remained on the field even though BU no longer had a football program, were not repainted. The platform built for Bush and Mitterrand was removed during the summer of 2008, when the field was expanded and resurfaced.

In the summer of 2015, the field received a new artificial turf, GreenFields MX Trimension; the new surface was installed over a period of five weeks, covering 110,000 square feet (10,000 m^{2}).

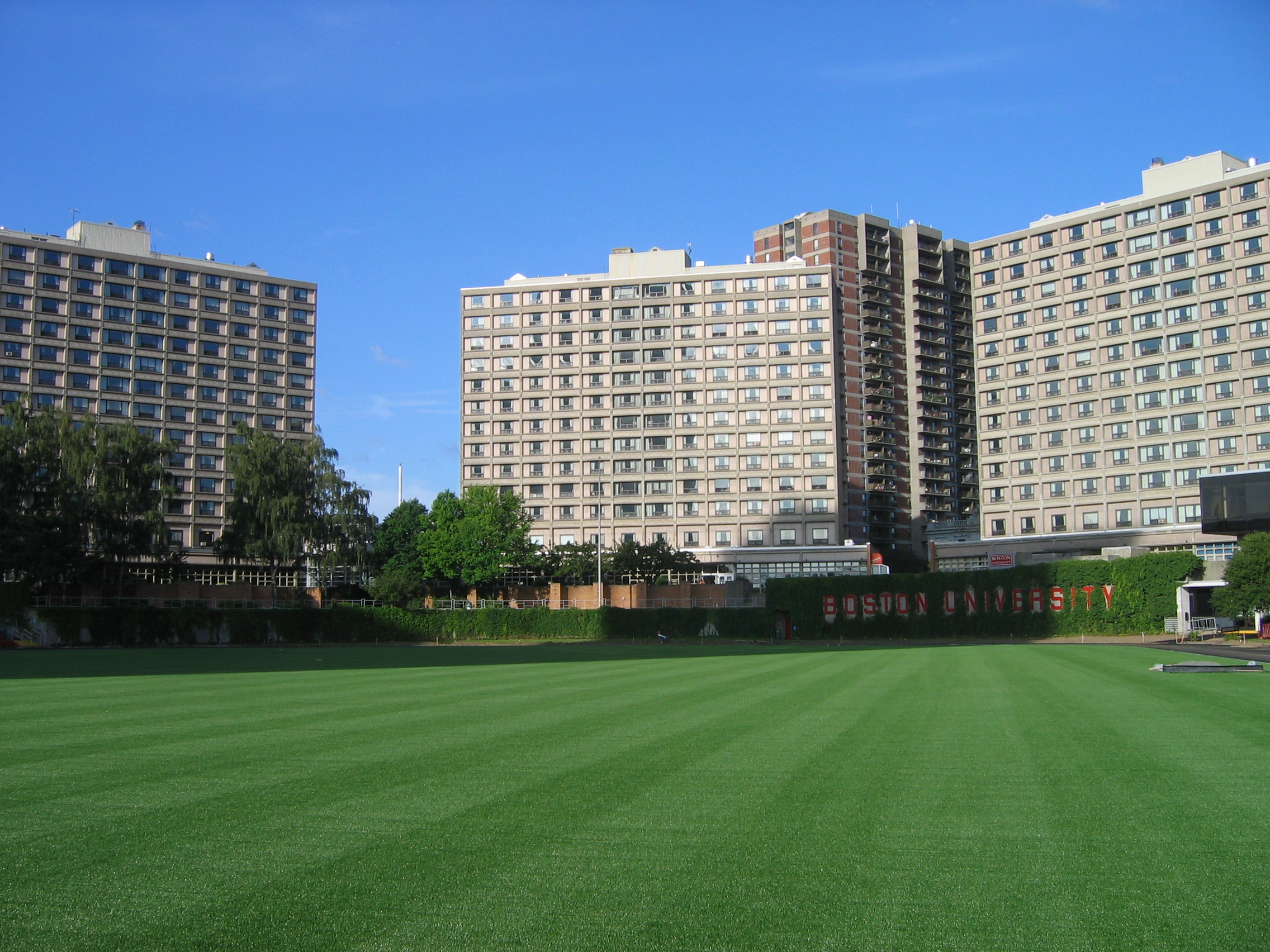
View from the field, 2008.

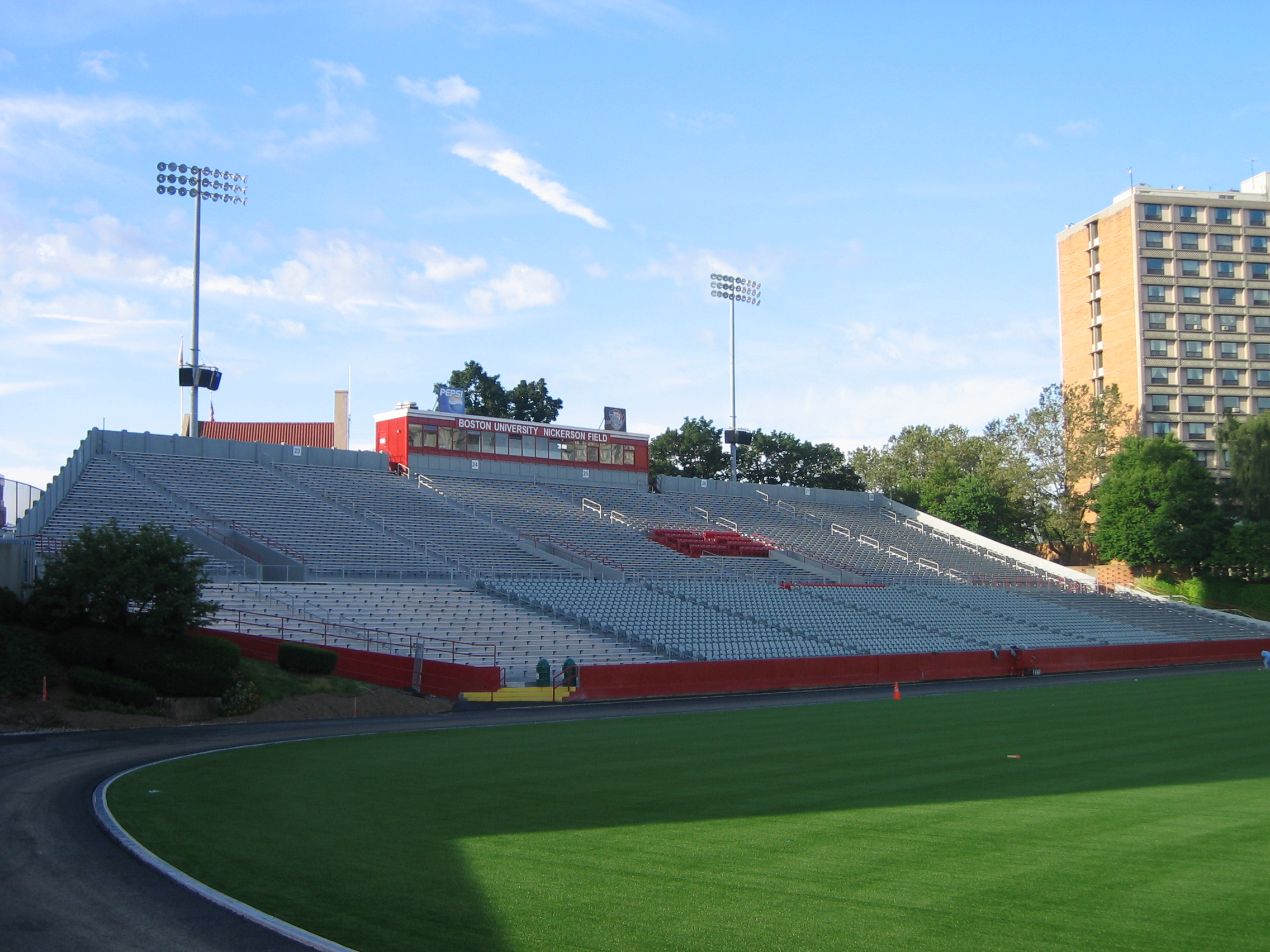
Former right field pavilion, 2008.

Main concourse under the stadium's seating, 2006.

=== Use by professional sports ===
Since its reconfiguration in the 1950s, multiple professional sports franchises have used the stadium:

Year(s)	Team	Sport	League(s)
1960–1962	Boston Patriots	American football	AFL
1974–1975	Boston Astros	Soccer	ASL
1975	Boston Minutemen	Soccer	NASL
1979	New England Tea Men (Note: The Tea Men used Nickerson after Foxboro Raceway filed a temporary restraining order preventing them from using Schaefer Stadium.)	Soccer	NASL
1983	Boston Breakers	American football	USFL
1988–1990	Boston Bolts	Soccer	ASL / APSL
2001–2003	Boston Breakers	Soccer	WUSA
2004–2006	Boston Cannons	Lacrosse	MLL (Note: The 2004 and 2005 Major League Lacrosse championships were played at the stadium.)
2009–present	Boston Bears	Rugby league	AMNRL, USARL, NARL, RLU (Note: Rugby League United.)

Notes

Events and tenants
Preceded by first stadium	Home of the Boston Patriots; 1960 – 1962	Succeeded by Fenway Park
Preceded by Cawley Memorial Stadium	Home of the Boston Cannons; 2004 – 2006	Succeeded by Harvard Stadium
Preceded by Villanova Stadium	Host of Major League Lacrosse championship weekend 2004 – 2005	Succeeded by Home Depot Center Track Stadium
