= Washington Stars =

The Washington Stars were an American soccer team established in 1987 as F.C. Washington. The team entered the American Soccer League in 1988 under the name Washington Stars and merged with the Maryland Bays in 1990.

== History ==
Founded in the spring of 1987 as F.C. Washington, the team grew out of the Fairfax Spartans which won the 1986 National Amateur Cup. The team, headed by president Gordon Bradley and located in Fairfax, Virginia, hired John Kerr, Sr. as head coach on June 24, 1987. Coach Bradley was the coach of George Mason University (GMU) at that time. Two of their players, Kent Shiffert and Chris Maier were recruited from GMU. The team played its first game on July 26, 1987 against the Canadian Pan American soccer team. In March 1988, the team became a charter member of the third American Soccer League under the name Washington Stars. The team joined the American Professional Soccer League in 1990 when the ASL merged with the Western Soccer League. After the 1990 season, the team merged into the Maryland Bays. The team played at stadiums at Fairfax High School and W.T. Woodson High School in Fairfax, Virginia.

Bruce Murray, a member of the U.S. National Team who earned 88 caps had a hand in both US goals at the 1990 World Cup (a goal against Austria and an assist against Czechoslovakia), played for the Stars in all three seasons.

=== Year-by-year ===
Year	Division	League	Reg. season	Playoffs	Open Cup
1988	N/A	ASL	3rd, Northern	Did not qualify	Did not enter
1989	N/A	ASL	1st, Northern	Semifinals	Did not enter
1990	N/A	APSL	5th, ASL North	Did not qualify	Did not enter

=== Coach ===
- John Kerr, Sr. (1987–1990)
- George Lidster (assistant) (1987–1990)

=== Mascot ===
The Washington Stars mascot was a human dressed in a black skin tight suit with silver moon boots, silver cape, and a large foam head in the shape of a star. Historically, the Washington Stars hired local students from W.T. Woodson High School to serve as the mascot. Michael Salih was the original and longest serving StarMan.
