= San Diego Sockers 2 =

- Founded: 2017
- Dissolved: 2019
- Ground: Frontwave Arena; Oceanside, California
- Capacity: 5,500
- CEO: David Pike
- League: Major Arena Soccer League 2
- 2018–19: 1st, Western Division; Playoffs: M2 Champions
- Website: http://www.sdsockers.com/sockers2

The San Diego Sockers 2 are an American professional indoor soccer team based in San Diego County, California, that competes in the Major Arena Soccer League 2. The team was founded in 2017.

== History ==
Sockers 2 was created in 2017 to develop prospects for the San Diego Sockers.

The team went 7–5 in the regular season in 2018 and 2–1 in the playoffs, winning the first M2 Western Conference Championship. Sockers 2 advanced to the inaugural M2 Cup, falling to the eventual champions, the Chicago Mustangs, 7–0.

The team captured the M2 Championship in 2019 with a 7–5 victory over Cuervos de Juarez. The team did not compete in the 2020 or 2021 M2 seasons. On June 24, 2021, M2 announced Sockers 2 will return in the 2021–2022 season. Sockers 2 won the 2022 M2 Championship.
