= Lockhart Stadium =

Demolished soccer stadium in Fort Lauderdale, Florida

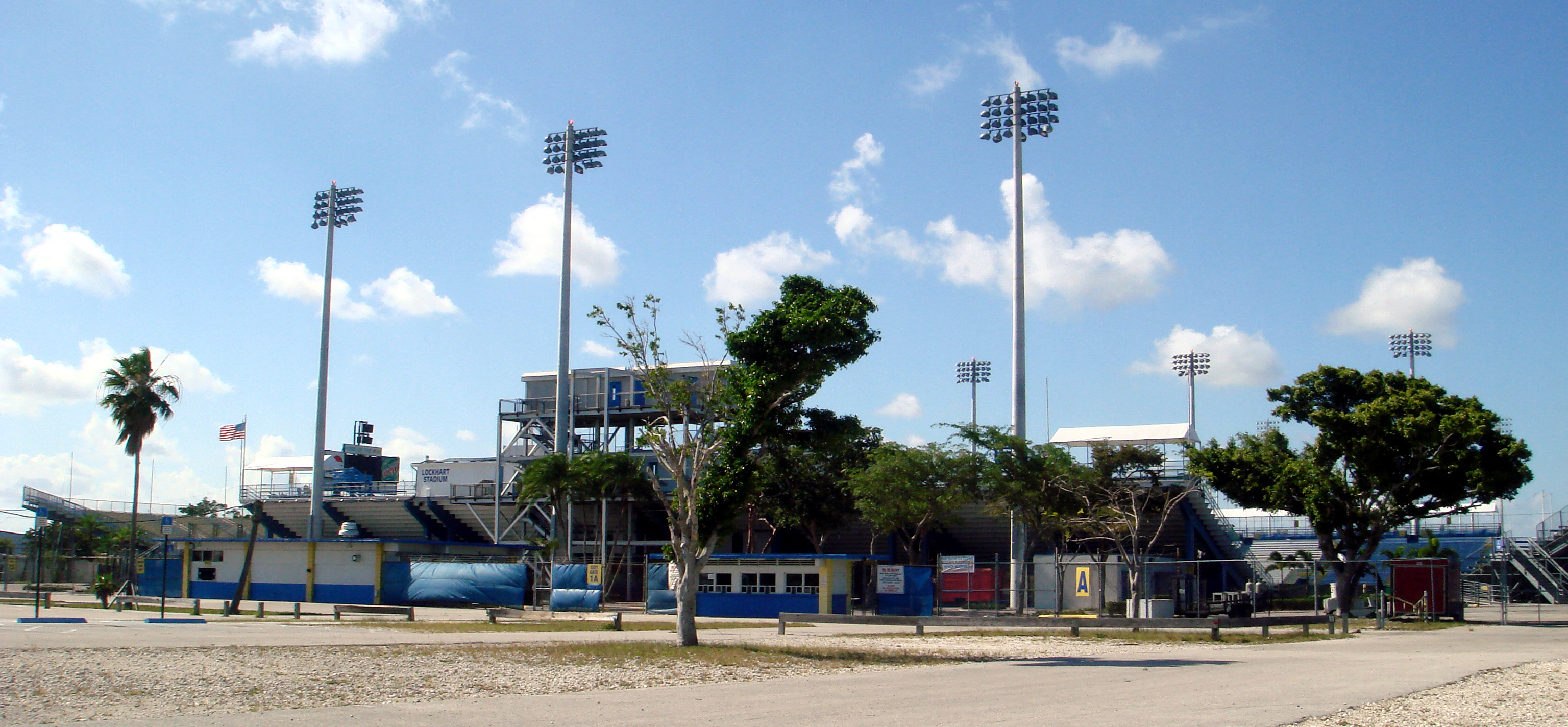

- Location within Florida Lockhart Stadium (the United States)
- Interactive map of Lockhart Stadium
- Address: 1350 Northwest 55th Street; Fort Lauderdale, Florida
- Coordinates: 26°11′35″N 80°9′40″W
- Public transit: Cypress Creek
- Owner: City of Fort Lauderdale
- Capacity: 17,417
- Surface: Grass

Construction
- Opened: 1959
- Demolished: May 8, 2019
- Construction cost: Unknown $5 million renovation in 1998 ($9.88 million in 2025 dollars)

Tenants
- Fort Lauderdale Strikers (NASL) 1977–1983; Fort Lauderdale Strikers (ASL/APSL) 1988–1994; Fort Lauderdale Strikers (USISL) 1994–1997; Miami Fusion (MLS) 1998–2001; Florida Atlantic Owls (NCAA) 2003–2010; Miami FC (USL-1) 2009–2010; Fort Lauderdale Barracudas (SFL) 2011; Fort Lauderdale Strikers (NASL) 2011–2016; Fort Lauderdale Strikers U-23 (NPSL) 2016

Lockhart Stadium was a stadium in Fort Lauderdale, Florida, United States. It was used in a variety of sports, particularly soccer and American football.

Originally designed in 1959 for high school sports, the stadium's long-standing soccer connection began in 1977 when it became the home venue for the original Fort Lauderdale Strikers of the original North American Soccer League (NASL). In 1998, it was refitted for soccer to house the Miami Fusion in Major League Soccer, but the team was withdrawn from the league and folded after the 2001 season. It was also the home stadium of the Florida Atlantic Owls football team from 2002 to 2010. Later it was the home of the Fort Lauderdale Strikers of the second iteration of NASL from 2011 to 2016.

The stadium site was redeveloped in 2019 and 2020 with the construction of Chase Stadium for Major League Soccer club Inter Miami CF.

== History ==
The stadium was built in 1959 as part of a new sports complex that also included the Fort Lauderdale Stadium baseball park. It was originally designed to host American football and track and field competitions for four local high schools: Fort Lauderdale High School, Stranahan High School, Northeast High School, and Dillard High School. The stadium was named for former city commissioner H. Y. "Doug" Lockhart and was dedicated at a football game on September 18, 1959.

For nearly twenty years, Lockhart Stadium was primarily used for high school football and track, but occasionally saw use for state football as well as soccer. A more substantial role as a soccer venue came in 1977, when the Miami Toros of the original North American Soccer League relocated to the stadium, renaming themselves the Fort Lauderdale Strikers. This began Lockhart's long association with the sport. The Strikers played there until 1982, when they moved to Minnesota. On November 23, 1980, the United States men's national soccer team defeated Mexico 2–1 in a World Cup qualifier at Lockhart, the first U.S. win over Mexico in over 46 years.

After the departure of the Strikers, the stadium largely returned to its original use for high school sports for several years. The stadium would, however, play host to Miami Dolphins scrimmages during training camps in the late 1990s.

In 1998, the stadium was renovated for use by the Miami Fusion of Major League Soccer (MLS). The renovation increased capacity to 20,000 and redesigned the field expressly for soccer. This was an unusual move at the time, as all other MLS teams played in football stadiums, and started the league's eventual trend toward soccer-specific stadiums.

The stadium continued to host high-profile soccer games through this period, including D.C. United's 1998 victory over Vasco da Gama in the Interamerican Cup. However, the Fusion were contracted by the league in 2002. In 2003 Lockhart was refitted once again for use by the Florida Atlantic University Owls college football team. In 2011, the Owls began playing at the on-campus FAU Stadium in Boca Raton.

Billy Graham's final South Florida crusade took place at the Lockhart Stadium in 1985. The stadium was host to the 2007 Caribbean Carnival for Broward County, after Miramar turned their request down. The stadium also hosted the 2008 and 2009 MLS combines.

In 2009, Miami FC moved to Lockhart Stadium from Miami. They changed their name to the Fort Lauderdale Strikers in 2011.

The Fort Lauderdale Strikers announced in 2016 that they were moving from Lockhart Stadium to a stadium at Central Broward Regional Park. A $70-million Schlitterbahn Water Park proposed for the 64 acres taken up by Lockhart Stadium was tied up in court being challenged by the owners of Rapids Water Park in Riviera Beach. After the Strikers' 2016 departure, the stadium fell into a state of disrepair.

In late January 2019, Major League Soccer expansion team Inter Miami CF announced its intentions to pursue the Lockhart Stadium site to serve as the club's training ground for its first team, youth academy, and USL League One reserve side Fort Lauderdale CF. The development would also include an 18,000-seat stadium, which will serve as the long-term home of Fort Lauderdale CF as well as the interim home of the first team while the Nu Stadium stadium was under construction. The Fort Lauderdale city council unanimously approved Inter Miami's bid for the Lockhart Stadium site on March 19. On April 2, the Fort Lauderdale City Commission cleared Inter Miami to begin the demolition process; as part of the deal, the team was to begin clearing the site within 180 days, with demolition of the stadium beginning on May 8.

On July 9, 2019, the Fort Lauderdale City Commission unanimously approved a 50-year lease agreement for the Lockhart Stadium site with Inter Miami; under the terms of the agreement, the city of Fort Lauderdale will retain ownership of the property while Inter Miami will be responsible for the construction, operation, and maintenance of the new stadium and facilities.

== USA Eagles internationals ==
The stadium hosted two USA Eagles internationals in 2003 and 2016.

| Date | Home | Score | Opponent | Competition | Attendance |
|---|---|---|---|---|---|
| April 27, 2003 | United States | 58–13 | Spain | 2003 Rugby World Cup – repechage qualification | 1,730 |
| February 20, 2016 | United States | 64–0 | Chile | 2016 Americas Rugby Championship | 13,591 |

| Preceded by Tropical Park Stadium | Home of Fort Lauderdale Strikers; 2009–2016 | Succeeded by Central Broward Regional Park |
| Preceded by Stanford Stadium | Host of the College Cup; 1982–1983 | Succeeded by Kingdome |
