= Boston Bolts (1988–1990) =

- Full name: Boston Bolts
- Founded: 1988
- Dissolved: 1990
- Stadium: Nickerson Field
- League: APSL
- 1990: 4th, North
Home colors	Away colors

The Boston Bolts were a short lived U.S. soccer team which came into existence in 1988 as a member of the third American Soccer League (ASL). They played in Boston, Massachusetts at Nickerson Field. The team joined the American Professional Soccer League in 1990 when the ASL merged with the Western Soccer League.

== History ==
=== 1988 ===
Both the Bolts and the American Soccer League entered their first year of existence in 1988. Most observers expected the Bolts to compete for their divisional title, but they finished fourth with a 9-11 record and well out of playoff contention. Despite this disappointment, the team did place Ross Irwin on the All-Star team.

=== 1989 ===
The Bolts rebounded from their failed first year campaign to take second place in the Northern Division with a 13-7 record. They defeated the Tampa Bay Rowdies in the semifinals before falling to the Fort Lauderdale Strikers in the title series. Even with their greater team success, the Bolts still only put one player, Dehinde Akinlotan, on the All Star list.

=== 1990 ===
At the end of the 1989 season, the ASL merged with the west coast Western Soccer League to form the American Professional Soccer League (APSL). The APSL was not a true league in that teams played other teams only in their conference. The East Conference was essentially the ASL and the West was the WSL. The first times teams from the two old leagues met in a competitive match was the championship game. The Bolts regressed to their first year performances, finishing fourth in the North Division with a 9-11 record. The club folded at the end of the season.

== Honors ==
All Stars

- 1988: Ross Irwin
- 1989: Dehinde Akinlotan

== Year-by-year ==
Year	Division	League	Reg. season	Playoffs	Open Cup
1988	N/A	ASL	4th, Northern	Did not qualify	Did not enter
1989	N/A	ASL	2nd, Northern	Final	Did not enter
1990	N/A	APSL	4th, ASL North	Did not qualify	Did not enter
