= Ricardo Alonso =

Argentine footballer (born 1957)

Personal information
- Date of birth: 21 March 1957 (age 69)
- Place of birth: Tandil, Argentina
- Positions: Striker; defender

Senior career*
Years	Team	Apps	(Gls)
1979–1981	Minnesota Kicks	59	(25)
1979–1981	Minnesota Kicks (indoor)	28	(30)
1981–1982	Jacksonville Tea Men (indoor)	14	(24)
1982	Jacksonville Tea Men	30	(21)
1982–1984	Chicago Sting (indoor)	40	(35)
1983–1984	Chicago Sting	35	(19)
1984	Golden Bay Earthquakes	5	(2)
1984–1985	Minnesota Strikers (indoor)	35	(8)
1985	Tulsa Tornados		
1985–1987	Chicago Sting (indoor)	67	(22)
1987–1988	Jacksonville Generals (indoor)		
1988–1989	Memphis Storm (indoor)	18	(16)
1988–1989	Fort Wayne Flames (indoor)	19	(13)
1989–1990	Memphis Rogues (indoor)	4	(1)
1989–1990	Fort Lauderdale Strikers		
1991	Miami Freedom	18	(2)
- * Club domestic league appearances and goals

Ricardo Alonso (born 21 March 1957) is a former soccer player who began as a forward before moving to defender later in his career. Alonso spent six seasons in the North American Soccer League, four in Major Indoor Soccer League, at least three in the American Indoor Soccer Association, one in the American Soccer League and two in the American Professional Soccer League.

== Outdoor ==
=== NASL ===
Alonso was born in Argentina. He signed with the Minnesota Kicks of the North American Soccer League in 1979 and spent three seasons with the team. He then moved to the Jacksonville Tea Men for the 1982 season. That year, he scored twenty-one goals in thirty games, earning first team All Star recognition. In 1983, he signed with the Chicago Sting when the Tea Men left the NASL. He played one full season with the Sting, earning 1983 second team All Star recognition, but was traded, along with Charlie Fajkus, to the Golden Bay Earthquakes in exchange for Hayden Knight and Manny Rojas on 10 July 1984. Alonso finished the 1984 season with the Earthquakes, but the NASL folded at the end of the season and the Earthquakes moved to the semi-professional Western Soccer Alliance.

=== ASL and APSL ===
Following the collapse of the NASL following the 1984 season, Alonso spent several seasons playing indoor soccer. He returned to the outdoor game in 1989 with the Fort Lauderdale Strikers of the American Soccer League. That year he led the league in scoring with ten goals and seven assists. He was also named a first team All Star. In 1990, the ASL merged with the Western Soccer League to form the American Professional Soccer League. Alonso remained with the Strikers, now in the APSL. In 1991, he then moved to the Miami Freedom for the 1991 season before retiring.

== Indoor soccer ==
=== NASL ===
Alonso played the 1983–84 NASL indoor season with the Chicago Sting.

=== MISL ===
The year before that, the Chicago Sting entered the 1982–83 Major Indoor Soccer League season. With the collapse of the NASL in 1984, Alonso became a dedicated indoor player. He signed with the Minnesota Strikers for the 1984–85 season. When he was released by the Strikers, he returned to the Sting, which was now competing in MISL. On 24 October 1985, he signed a one-year contract with the Sting after a month-long trial. On 29 April 1986, he signed another one-year contract with the Chicago Sting of MISL. That year, he moved to defender.

=== AISA ===
The Sting released Alonso after a disappointing 1986–87 season and he signed with the Jacksonville Generals of the American Indoor Soccer Association for the 1987–88 season. He then moved to the Memphis Storm for the 1988–89 season, however, he was traded to the Fort Wayne Flames during the season. Alonso then spent the 1989–90 season with the Memphis Rogues.
