= Nomads Soccer Club =

Soccer club based in San Diego, California

Nomads SC
- Full name: Nomads Soccer Club
- Founded: 1976; 50 years ago
- Ground: San Diego, California
- Website: www.nomadssoccer.org

Nomads Soccer Club (formerly San Diego Nomads) is an American soccer club based in San Diego, California. Founded in 1976, Joe Hollow formed the Nomads using the best players from a local league in La Jolla. From 1986 to 1990, the club fielded a professional senior team, but has since operated as an amateur and youth club.

== History ==
The Nomads were founded in 1976, formed by Joe Hollow using the best players from a local league in La Jolla. They added a senior team, the Western Soccer Alliance, in 1986. The club became not-for-profit in 1987. In 1989, the WSA changed its name to the Western Soccer League and in 1990, the team joined the American Professional Soccer League. In 1990, the WSL merged with the American Soccer League. After winning the WSL championship in 1989, they lost to the Fort Lauderdale Strikers of the ASL in the 1989 National Pro Soccer Championship. After the 1990 season, the Nomads relinquished its senior team due to the financial demands of the American soccer league. The club continued as an amateur club, which still exists, in San Diego County.

== Year-by-year ==
Year	Division	League	Reg. season	Playoffs	Open Cup
1986	N/A	WSA	5th	No playoffs	Did not enter
1987	N/A	WSA	1st	Champion	Did not enter
1988	N/A	WSA	2nd	Semifinal	Did not enter
1989	N/A	WSL	1st, South	Champion	Did not enter
1990	N/A	APSL	4th, WSL South	Did not qualify	Did not enter

== Coach ==
- (England) Derek Armstrong: 1986–1990
- (Scotland) Brian McManus (assistant): 1986–1990

== Notable players ==
- (United States) Paul Caligiuri (1986)
- (United States) Rob Ryerson (1986)
- (Scotland) Brian McManus (1986, 1989)
- (United States) Jeff Duback (1986)
- (United States) Anton Nistl (1987–1990)
- (United States) Marcelo Balboa (1987–1989)
- (England) Paul Dougherty (1988)
- (United States) Cle Kooiman (1990)
- (United States) Steve Boardman 1986-1990
- (United States) Eric Wynalda 1988–1990
- (United States) Frankie Hejduk (1989-1991)
- (United States) Jovan Kirovski (1991)
- (United States) Joe Corona (2006-2008)
- (United States) Earl Edwards Jr. (2009-2010)
- (United States) Christopher Jaime (until 2019)
- (United States) Eric Avila
- (United States) Joe Gallardo
- (United States) Chuy Sanchez
- (United States) Gabriel Farfán
- (United States) Luca de la Torre (2011–2012)
- (United States) Steve Cherundolo (-1997)
