= American Soccer League (1988–1989) =

Former soccer league

- Founded: 1988
- Folded: 1989
- Replaced by: American Professional Soccer League
- Country: United States
- Number of clubs: 10

The American Soccer League was a professional soccer league in the United States. The league was founded in 1988 as an East Coast counterpart to the West Coast-based Western Soccer Alliance. The American Soccer League lasted only two seasons, merging with the WSA in 1990 to form the American Professional Soccer League. The ASL is unrelated to either of the previous leagues which were also named "American Soccer League".

== History ==
The league comprised ten teams on the East Coast in an attempt to support professional outdoor soccer in the wake of the North American Soccer League's collapse in 1984. During its second season, the league champion Fort Lauderdale Strikers played the San Diego Nomads, champions of the Western Soccer Alliance in the 1989 National Pro Soccer Championship. On February 22, 1990, the ASL and WSA announced that they would merge to form the American Professional Soccer League. The inaugural season would be modeled based on Major League Baseball, with separate schedules and the winners of each league playing a championship game. The new league would satisfy a requirement from FIFA to establish and maintain a professional league ahead of the 1994 World Cup, to be hosted by the United States.

== Teams ==
- Albany Capitals (1988–89)
- Boston Bolts (1988–89)
- Fort Lauderdale Strikers (1988–89)
- Maryland Bays (1988–89)
- Miami Sharks (1988–89)
- New Jersey Eagles (1988–89)
- Orlando Lions (1988–89)
- Tampa Bay Rowdies (1988–89)
- Washington Diplomats (1988–89)
- Washington Stars (1988–89)

== Champions ==
Season	Winner	Runners-up	Top scorer
1988	Washington Diplomats	Fort Lauderdale Strikers	Jorge Acosta
1989	Fort Lauderdale Strikers	Boston Bolts	Ricardo Alonso; Mirko Castillo

ASL/WSL Championship
Year	Winner	Score	Runners-up	Venue	Location	Attendance
1989	Fort Lauderdale Strikers	3–1	San Diego Nomads	Spartan Stadium	San Jose, California	8,632
