= Fort Lauderdale Strikers (1988–1994) =

- Full name: Fort Lauderdale Strikers
- Nickname: Strikers
- Founded: 1987 (Previously Minnesota Strikers); 1990 (merged with Orlando Lions (1988–90), retaining name)
- Dissolved: 1994 (New Strikers in USISL)
- Ground: Lockhart Stadium; Pompano Beach Municipal Stadium (7 games in 1990); Royal Palm Polo Club, Boca Raton (5 games in 1990)
- Owner(s): Joe Robbie; Noel Lemon
- League: American Soccer League (1988–89); American Professional Soccer League (1990–94)
Home colours	Away colours

The Fort Lauderdale Strikers were an American soccer team established in 1988 as part of the third American Soccer League. In 1990, it moved to the American Professional Soccer League where it spent five seasons before folding in 1994. The Strikers won the 1989 ASL championship, as well as the 1989 National Pro Soccer Championship.

== History ==
In October 1987, the American Soccer League announced that it had awarded a franchise to Joe Robbie which would be located in Fort Lauderdale, Florida. Robbie, who owned the Minnesota Strikers of the Major Indoor Soccer League announced his intentions of resurrecting the name Fort Lauderdale Strikers and hired Wim Suurbier to coach the team.

The team played their home games in Lockhart Stadium. In their first season, the Strikers stormed the ASL, finishing with a 14–6 record, best in the league, before falling to the Washington Diplomats in the finals.

In 1988, Robbie later sold his share in the team to Noel Lemon. In January 1989, Suurbier resigned as coach to be replaced by Thomas Rongen. In their second season the Strikers did almost as well, finishing the season at 12–8. They went on to defeat the Boston Bolts for the 1989 championship. This qualified them for the 1989 National Pro Soccer Championship, the first American national outdoor soccer championship since the collapse of the North American Soccer League in 1984.

On September 9, 1989, the Strikers defeated the San Diego Nomads of the Western Soccer League, 3–1, to win the title. Following that game, the ASL merged with the WSL to form the American Professional Soccer League. They played five more years in that league. For the 1990 season seven home games were played at Pompano Beach Municipal Stadium and five at the Royal Palm Polo Club in Boca Raton, after the Broward School Board denied the team access to Lockhart Stadium.

In January 1991, the Strikers merged with the Orlando Lions. The combined team retained the Strikers name, uniforms and staff. Soon after Lemons sold the team to Bryan Lockwood.

The 1993 Fort Lauderdale Strikers season was the fourth season of the team in the American Professional Soccer League. It was the club's twenty-seventh season in professional soccer. This year, with goalkeeper Chris Antonopoulos and Jorge Valenzuelai in goal, the team finished with a win-loss record of 9-15, placing sixth place in the regular season. They did not make it to the playoffs. The Fort Lauderdale Strikers finished the 1994 APSL season with a record of 8 wins, 12 losses, and 2 shootout wins, placing fifth in the league with 72 points.

The team had an ongoing rivalry with the Tampa Bay Rowdies that stemmed from Robbie's previous Strikers team's rivalry with same Rowdies, while playing in the NASL.

== Kit ==
When they first played in 1988, the Strikers played in a cream shirt with white sleeves and black shorts with white socks. That kit has been used as their home kit from that time until they dissolved.

Their away kit from 1988 to 1990 was a red shirt and white shorts with white socks. After their second game in the 1990 season, they switched to an all-white kit and played in that until 1994 when they dissolved.

== Year-by-year ==
Year	Division	League	Reg. season	Playoffs	Open Cup
1988	N/A	ASL	1st, Southern	Final	did not enter
1989	N/A	ASL	2nd, Southern	Champion	did not enter
1990	N/A	APSL	1st, ASL South	Final	did not enter
1991	N/A	APSL	1st, American	Semifinals	did not enter
1992	N/A	APSL	4th	Semifinals	did not enter
1993	N/A	APSL	6th	did not qualify	did not enter
1994	2	APSL	5th	did not qualify	did not enter

== Coaches ==
- Wim Suurbier (1988)
- Thomas Rongen (1989–1994)

== See also ==
- Fort Lauderdale Strikers (1977–1983)
- Fort Lauderdale Sun Division 2 team of the short-lived USL (1984–85)
- Fort Lauderdale Strikers (1994–1997)
- Miami Fusion Now defunct MLS team (1997–2001)
- Fort Lauderdale Strikers Division 2 team competing in the NASL, originally named Miami FC
- Fort Lauderdale–Tampa Bay rivalry
