= 1991 San Francisco Bay Blackhawks season =

San Francisco Bay Blackhawks
1991 season
- Owner: Dan Van Voorhis
- Coach: (England) Laurie Calloway
- Stadium: Newark Memorial Stadium
- APSL: Conference: 2nd Overall: 2nd
- APSL Playoffs: Champions
- U.S. Open Cup: Did not enter
- Top goalscorer: Townsend Qin (6)

The 1991 San Francisco Bay Blackhawks season was the club's second in the American Professional Soccer League and their third season overall. The Blackhawks finished with the second-best overall record and went on to win the championship, beating the Albany Capitals in the finals.

== Squad ==
The 1991 squad

Note: Flags indicate national team as defined under FIFA eligibility rules; some limited exceptions apply. Players may hold more than one non-FIFA nationality.

No.	Pos.	Nation	Player
—	MF	USA	Jeff Baicher
—	DF	USA	Marcelo Balboa
—	FW	USA	Paul Bravo
—	FW	USA	Steve Corpening
—	DF	USA	Troy Dayak
—	GK	USA	Mark Dougherty
—	FW	USA	Chance Fry
—	MF	USA	Paul Holocher
—	FW	JAM	Peter Isaacs
—	FW	USA	Mark Kerlin
—	MF	USA	Dominic Kinnear

No.	Pos.	Nation	Player
—	MF	USA	Bernie Lilavois
—	MF	USA	Lawrence Lozzano
—	DF	USA	Tim Martin
—	DF	USA	Danny Pena
—	MF	CHN	Townsend Qin
—	MF	SLV	Jorge Salazar
—	DF	USA	Mark Semioli
—	DF		Joe Silva
—	FW	VIE	Dzung Tran
—	DF	USA	Derek Van Rheenen
—	FW	USA	Scott Wulferdingen
—	FW	USA	Eric Wynalda

== Competitions ==
=== APSL ===
==== Season ====
Date	Opponent	Venue	Result	Scorers
May 4, 1991	Salt Lake Sting	H	1–0 (aet)	
May 15, 1991	Vancouver 86ers (CSL)	H	1–0	Qin
May 26, 1991	Miami Freedom	H	4–0	Baicher, Salazar, Kinnear, Fry
June 1, 1991	Penn-Jersey Spirit	H	4–1	Holocher, Martin, Qin (2)
June 7, 1991	Salt Lake Sting	A	0–0*	
June 9, 1991	Colorado Foxes	A	2–1	Bravo, Baicher
June 15, 1991	Colorado Foxes	A	3–1	Bravo, Van Rheenen, Lilavois
June 21, 1991	Albany Capitals	H	1–0	Wynalda
June 28, 1991	Tampa Bay Rowdies	A	2–1	Qin, Holocher
June 29, 1991	Fort Lauderdale Strikers	A	1–1*	Isaacs
July 3, 1991	Albany Capitals	A	1–2	Salazar
July 6, 1991	Maryland Bays	H	3–1	Fry (2), Baicher
July 12, 1991	Tampa Bay Rowdies	H	1–0	Fry
July 20, 1991	Fort Lauderdale Strikers	H	0–0*	
July 27, 1991	Penn-Jersey Spirit	A	1–1*	Qin
July 30, 1991	Salt Lake Sting	H	1–0@	
August 10, 1991	Maryland Bays	A	1–2	Balboa
August 11, 1991	Miami Freedom	A	2–1	Balboa (2)
August 18, 1991	Colorado Foxes	H	1–2 (aet)	Fry
August 23, 1991	Salt Lake Sting	A	1–0@	
August 26, 1991	Colorado Foxes	H	2–2*	Qin, Salazar

==== Playoffs ====
Date	Opponent	Venue	Result	Scorers
September 7, 1991	Fort Lauderdale Strikers	H	1–0 (aet)	Kinnear
September 14, 1991	Fort Lauderdale Strikers	A	1–0 (aet)	
September 22, 1991	Albany Capitals	A	1–3	Van Rheenen
September 28, 1991	Albany Capitals	H	2–0	Qin, Balboa
September 28, 1991	Albany Capitals	H	1–0#	

* = Shootout
@ = Forfeit
# = Series tied, 1-1. S. F. Bay wins mini-game

=== Western Conference ===
Place	Team	GP	W	L	WN	WE	WS	LN	LE	LS	GF	GA	GD	Points
1	Maryland Bays	21	19	2	17	1	1	2	0	0	54	23	+31	158
2	San Francisco Bay Blackhawks	21	17	4	12	1	4	2	1	1	33	16	+17	126
3	Colorado Foxes	21	13	8	11	1	1	7	0	1	36	27	+9	111
4	Salt Lake Sting	20	3	17	3	0	0	14	1	2	12	22	−10	33
