= 1992 San Francisco Bay Blackhawks season =

San Francisco Bay Blackhawks
1992 season
- Owner: Dan Van Voorhis
- Coach: (England) Laurie Calloway
- Stadium: Spartan Stadium
- APSL: 3rd
- APSL Playoffs: Semifinals
- U. S. Open Cup: Did not enter
- CONCACAF: Fifth Round
- Professional Cup: Semifinals
- Top goalscorer: Peter Isaacs (5)

The 1992 San Francisco Bay Blackhawks season was the club's third in the American Professional Soccer League and their fourth season overall. The Blackhawks finished in third place, and were defeated, 2–1, by the Tampa Bay Rowdies in the playoff semifinals. They also made a strong run in the CONCACAF Champions Cup, defeating three opponents and reaching the Fifth round, where they fell to Mexico's Club América by an aggregate 4-3 score.

== Squad ==
The 1992 squad

Note: Flags indicate national team as defined under FIFA eligibility rules; some limited exceptions apply. Players may hold more than one non-FIFA nationality.

No.	Pos.	Nation	Player
—	FW	USA	Paul Bravo
—	GK	USA	Mark Dougherty
—	DF	USA	John Doyle
—	MF	USA	John Garvey
—	MF	USA	Paul Holocher
—	FW	JAM	Peter Isaacs
—	DF	USA	Rick Iversen
—	MF	USA	Dominic Kinnear
—	MF	USA	Joey Leonetti
—	MF	USA	Bernie Lilavois
—	MF	USA	Lawrence Lozzano

No.	Pos.	Nation	Player
—	MF	ENG	Paul Mariner
—	DF	USA	Tim Martin
—	FW	USA	Mike Masters
—	DF	USA	Danny Pena
—	MF	CHN	Townsend Qin
—	MF	SLV	Jorge Salazar
—	GK	USA	Dave Salzwedel
—	DF	USA	Mark Semioli
—			Anthony Silva
—	DF	USA	Derek Van Rheenen
—	FW	USA	Justin Wall
—	FW	USA	Eric Wynalda

== Competitions ==
=== APSL ===
==== Standings ====
Place	Team	GP	W	L	WN	WE	WS	LN	LE	LS	GF	GA	GD	Points
1	Colorado Foxes	16	11	5	10	0	1	5	0	0	26	18	+8	89
2	Tampa Bay Rowdies	16	10	6	8	1	1	4	1	1	34	25	+9	87
3	San Francisco Bay Blackhawks	16	8	8	6	0	2	6	0	2	27	25	+2	73
4	Fort Lauderdale Strikers	16	7	9	4	2	1	8	0	1	25	23	+2	61
5	Miami Freedom	16	4	12	4	0	0	9	2	1	17	38	-21	43

==== Season ====
Date	Opponent	Venue	Result	Scorers
May 9, 1992	Tampa Bay Rowdies	A	1–1*	Isaacs
May 10, 1992	Fort Lauderdale Strikers	A	1–1*	Isaacs
May 13, 1992	Colorado Foxes	H	2–0	Bravo, Lilavois
May 16, 1992	Fort Lauderdale Strikers	H	4–2	Masters (2), Isaacs, Lilavois
May 30, 1992	Colorado Foxes	H	3–0	Wynalda, Masters, Isaacs
June 6, 1992	Colorado Foxes	A	1–3	Van Rheenen
June 19, 1992	Miami Freedom	A	1–0	Salazar
June 21, 1992	Tampa Bay Rowdies	A	1–3	Van Rheenen
June 25, 1992	Tampa Bay Rowdies	H	3–3*	Isaacs, Holocher, Leonetti
July 4, 1992	Miami Freedom	H	1–2	Masters
July 18, 1992	Colorado Foxes	A	0–1	
July 26, 1992	Fort Lauderdale Strikers	H	2–2*	Leonetti, Van Rheenen
July 31, 1992	Miami Freedom	A	0–2	
August 1, 1992	Fort Lauderdale Strikers	A	3–1	Pena, Garvey, Salazar
August 23, 1992	Miami Freedom	H	0–1	
August 29, 1992	Tampa Bay Rowdies	H	4–3	Lozzano (2), Lilavois (2)

==== Playoffs ====
Date	Opponent	Venue	Result	Scorers
September 11, 1992	Tampa Bay Rowdies	A	1–2	Kinnear

* = Shootout

=== CONCACAF Champions Cup ===
Date	Opponent	Venue	Result	Scorers
March 27, 1992	(Panama) A.F.C. Euro Kickers	H	10–0	
March 29, 1992	(Panama) A.F.C. Euro Kickers	H	1–0	
April 18, 1992	(Belize) La Victoria F.C.	H	3–2	
May 2, 1992	(Belize) La Victoria F.C.	A	2–0	Wynalda, Salazar
June 14, 1992	(Honduras) Real C.D. España	H	3–0	Leonetti, Masters
June 16, 1992	(Honduras) Real C.D. España	H	3–0	Leonetti, Masters, Doyle
August 9, 1992	(Mexico) Club América	A	1–3	Isaacs
August 16, 1992	(Mexico) Club América	H	2–1	Leonetti, Martin

=== Professional Cup ===
Date	Opponent	Venue	Result	Scorers
July 22, 1992	(United States) Chicago Power	H	2–0	Pena, Holocher
August 19, 1992	(United States) Chicago Power	A	3–2	Leonetti, ?, ?
September 5, 1992	(United States) Colorado Foxes	A	0–1	
