= 1990 San Francisco Bay Blackhawks season =

San Francisco Bay Blackhawks
1990 season
- Owner: Dan Van Voorhis
- Coach: (United States) Dean Wurzberger
- Stadium: Spartan Stadium
- APSL: Division: 1st Western; Conference: 1st
- APSL Playoffs: Final
- U.S. Open Cup: Did not enter
- Top goalscorer: Steve Corpening (8)

The 1990 San Francisco Bay Blackhawks season was the club's first in the American Professional Soccer League and their second season overall. The Blackhawks finished in first place in their division and made a strong run in the playoffs, defeating the Colorado Foxes and the Los Angeles Heat to win the Western Conference. The APSL final ended 1-1, and the Maryland Bays prevailed over the Blackhawks on penalty kicks.

== Squad ==
The 1990 squad

Note: Flags indicate national team as defined under FIFA eligibility rules; some limited exceptions apply. Players may hold more than one non-FIFA nationality.

No.	Pos.	Nation	Player
—	DF	USA	Alan Bailey
—	DF	USA	Marcelo Balboa
—	FW	USA	Steve Corpening
—	DF	USA	Troy Dayak
—	GK	USA	Mark Dougherty
—	DF	USA	John Doyle
—	MF	USA	Robert Gallo
—	MF	USA	Simon Ireland
—	FW	JAM	Peter Isaacs
—	MF	USA	Dominic Kinnear

No.	Pos.	Nation	Player
—	DF	USA	Tim Martin
—	MF		Ignacio Navarete
—	FW	USA	Dave Palic
—	MF	USA	Steve Petuskey
—	MF	CHN	Townsend Qin
—	DF	USA	Mark Semioli
—	DF	USA	Derek Van Rheenen
—	FW	USA	Kyle Whittemore
—	FW	USA	Scott Wulferdingen
—	FW	USA	Eric Wynalda
—	GK	USA	Eric Yamamoto

== Competitions ==
=== APSL ===
==== Playoffs ====
Date	Opponent	Venue	Result	Scorers
August 25, 1990	Colorado Foxes	H	2–1	Dayak (2)
September 8, 1990	Los Angeles Heat	A	0–2	
September 12, 1990	Los Angeles Heat	H	1–1*	
September 12, 1990	Los Angeles Heat	H	1–0#	Kinnear
September 23, 1990	Maryland Bays	A	1–1*	Isaacs

* = Penalty kicks
# = Series tied, 1-1. S. F. Bay wins mini-game

==== North Division ====
Place	Team	GP	W	SW	SL	L	GF	GA	Points
1	San Francisco Bay Blackhawks	20	9	4	1	6	39	30	104
2	Salt Lake Sting	20	11	1	1	7	39	34	104
3	Colorado Foxes	20	10	4	3	3	22	12	100
4	Portland Timbers	20	8	2	3	7	42	36	99
5	Seattle Storm	20	9	1	3	7	42	35	93

Points:

- Win: 6
- Shoot out win: 4
- Shoot out loss: 2
- 1 bonus point per goal scored in regulation, maximum of 3 per game
