= 1989 San Francisco Bay Blackhawks season =

San Francisco Bay Blackhawks
1989 season
- Owner: Dan Van Voorhis
- Coach: (United States) Dean Wurzberger
- Stadium: Spartan Stadium
- Western Soccer League: Division: 1st Overall: 2nd
- WSL Playoffs: Final
- National Challenge Cup: Did not enter
- Top goalscorer: Steve Corpening (11)

The 1989 San Francisco Bay Blackhawks season was the club's first overall, as they debuted in the Western Soccer League. The Blackhawks finished in first place in the North Division and reached the Final in the playoffs, getting past the Los Angeles Heat in the semis. The San Diego Nomads beat the Blackhawks in the final, 1–0.

== Squad ==
The 1989 squad

Note: Flags indicate national team as defined under FIFA eligibility rules; some limited exceptions apply. Players may hold more than one non-FIFA nationality.

No.	Pos.	Nation	Player
—	MF	USA	Jeff Baicher
—	DF	USA	Alan Bailey
—	DF	USA	Alex Basso
—	MF	USA	John Collins
—	FW	USA	Steve Corpening
—	DF	USA	Troy Dayak
—	GK	USA	Mark Dougherty
—	DF	USA	John Doyle
—	MF	USA	Robert Gallo
—	DF	USA	Rhett Harty
—	MF	USA	Dominic Kinnear

No.	Pos.	Nation	Player
—	MF		Thomas Kuntz
—	DF	USA	Tim Martin
—	MF		Ignacio Navarete
—	FW	USA	Dave Palic
—	FW	USA	George Pastor
—	MF	CHN	Townsend Qin
—	FW	USA	Derek Sanderson
—	DF	USA	Mark Semioli
—	MF	USA	Peter Woodring
—	FW	USA	Scott Wulferdingen
—	GK	USA	Eric Yamamoto

== Competitions ==
=== Western Soccer League ===
==== Season ====
Date	Opponent	Venue	Result	Scorers
April 22, 1989	Los Angeles Heat	H	3–1	Corpening (2), Palic
April 29, 1989	San Diego Nomads	H	2–3	Navarete, Palic
May 5, 1989	Real Santa Barbara	A	2–1	Palic, Semioli
May 7, 1989	California Kickers	A	1–1*	Doyle
May 13, 1989	Portland Timbers	H	3–2 (aet)	Corpening (2), Palic
May 20, 1989	Real Santa Barbara	H	5–4	Qin, Kinnear, Collins, Corpening, Basso
May 27, 1989	Sacramento Senators	A	2–1	Kinnear, Doyle
June 3, 1989	Sacramento Senators	H	4–0	Basso (2), Corpening, Navarete
June 9, 1989	California Kickers	H	0–0*	
June 24, 1989	Arizona Condors	A	1–1*	Corpening
July 1, 1989	San Diego Nomads	A	3–1	Corpening (2), Pastor
July 2, 1989	Los Angeles Heat	A	1–2	Corpening
July 8, 1989	Arizona Condors	H	3–1	Corpening, Kinnear (2)
July 14, 1989	Seattle Storm	A	2–4	Palic, Qin
July 15, 1989	Portland Timbers	A	0–0*	
July 23, 1989	Seattle Storm	H	3–2	Palic, Navarete, Qin

==== Playoffs ====
Date	Opponent	Venue	Result	Scorers
July 29, 1989	Los Angeles Heat	H	1–1*	Corpening
August 12, 1989	San Diego Nomads	A	0–1	

* = Penalty kicks

==== Standings ====
North Division
Pos	Team	Pld	W	L	GF	GA	GD	BP	Pts	Qualification
1	San Francisco Bay Blackhawks	16	11	5	37	26	+11	27	98	Playoffs
2	Portland Timbers	16	11	5	32	25	+7	21	92	Playoffs
3	Seattle Storm	16	10	6	32	23	+9	21	87	
4	Sacramento Senators	16	3	13	20	43	−23	9	40	
