= Jeff Baicher =

American soccer player and coach (born 1968)

Personal information
- Date of birth: November 16, 1968 (age 57)
- Place of birth: Sunnyvale, California, U.S.
- Height: 5 ft 10 in (1.78 m)
- Position: Forward

Youth career
- Sunnyvale United

College career
Years	Team	Apps	(Gls)
1987–1988	Foothill College		
1989–1990	Santa Clara Broncos		

Senior career*
Years	Team	Apps	(Gls)
1989–1992	San Francisco Bay Blackhawks		
1993	San Jose Hawks		
1994	CCV Hydra	16	(17)
1995	Monterey Bay Jaguars		
1995	San Jose Grizzlies (indoor)	17	(13)
1996–1999	San Jose Clash	102	(20)
1999	New England Revolution	10	(1)
2000	Kansas City Wizards	0	(0)
2000	Bay Area Seals	24	(3)

International career
1990–1991	United States	2	(0)

Managerial career
- Force Soccer Club
- US Youth National Team
- Santa Clara University
- * Club domestic league appearances and goals

Jeff Baicher (born November 16, 1968) is an American retired soccer forward whose professional career took him through multiple leagues, including the Western Soccer League, American Professional Soccer League, Continental Indoor Soccer League and Major League Soccer. He ended his playing career with the Bay Area Seals of the USL A-League. He earned two caps with the U.S. national team and coaches youth soccer.

== Youth ==
Baicher was born and raised in California. He lived in Santa Clara County while growing up and entered organized soccer with the Sunnyvale United Soccer Club. He also attended Homestead High School where he played on the boys soccer team. After graduating from high school, Baicher attended Foothill College, a local two year community college near his home and went to two straight State Championships. In 1989, he transferred to Santa Clara University where he spent the next two seasons. In 1989, Baichers first year with the Broncos, the team won the NCAA championship title against Virginia after the two schools played even through four overtimes. 1989 Baicher was named NCAA player of the year and was scouted by Manchester United and the US National Team. While at Santa Clara, he paired with fellow forward Paul Bravo who later teamed with Baicher at both the San Francisco Bay Blackhawks and the San Jose Clash. Baicher was named NCAA top 11 and was named NCAA All-America both in his Junior and Senior year. He ended his two years at Santa Clara fifth on the NCAA list of assists per game with 37 in 43 games.

== Minor leagues ==
While still in college, Baicher began playing for the professional soccer club San Francisco Bay Blackhawks of the Western Soccer League during the collegiate off season. He would remain with the Blackhawks for their entire existence under that name, beginning with the team's first season in 1989 and ending in 1991. During his years with the Blackhawks, he became an integral part of this dominant U.S. club. That same season, the Blackhawks went to the semifinals of the CONCACAF Champions' Cup. The last two seasons saw Baicher play for Laurie Calloway as well as former Broncos teammate Paul Bravo ..

In 1991, Baicher was recruited and traveled to England where he had a trial with Manchester United. Baicher trained with the first team and reserves and saw time with the reserve squad during the 1991 season before returning home in early 1992 for ACL reconstruction in his left knee.

In 1994, Baicher spent the season with the Central California Valley (CCV) Hydra of the U.S. Interregional Soccer League (USISL). The next year found him with the Monterey Bay Jaguars of the USISL Professional League. That season, Monterey Bay compiled a 16–4 record, taking their Division championship. That put them in the Sizzling Nine tournament where they failed to make the title game.

The 1995 season also saw Baicher spend time with the San Jose Grizzlies of the Continental Indoor Soccer League (CISL).

== MLS ==
In 1996, the San Jose Clash of Major League Soccer drafted Baicher for 1996 MLS Inaugural Player Draft. He went on to play from 1996 to 1999 in San Jose. The first two seasons saw him reunited with his former Blackhawks coach Laurie Calloway as well as his recurring teammate Paul Bravo. The team thought so highly of him that they protected him in the 1997 MLS Expansion Draft. However, in 1999, while he was the team's second leading scorer, San Jose sent him to the New England Revolution for Jair on August 13, 1999. The mid-season trade sparked considerable controversy as Robert Kraft owned both teams. Kraft owned the New England Patriots of the National Football League (NFL) and had grown up and lived in the New England area his entire life. At the time it appeared as if Kraft had made the trade in order to boost the Revolution's prospects at the expense of the Clash.

Regardless, Baicher spent only the remainder of the 1999 season with the Revs before being traded, with a third round draft pick, to the Kansas City Wizards on January 3, 2000, for the Wizards’ second, third and fourth round picks in the 2000 Super Draft. Baicher was furious with the trade and refused to move to Kansas City. He had spent his entire playing career in the San Francisco bay area and his wife had long established herself in the Silicon Valley computer industry. He demanded that the league send him back to San Jose. When MLS refused to invalidate the trade or pressure the Wizards to send him to the Earthquakes, Baicher retired from MLS. . Baicher was named the team's Offensive Player of the Year but decided to retire from playing professionally.

== National team ==
Baicher was scouted by US soccer for his performance in the NCAA final in 1989. He joined the US National Team pool after his junior year at Santa Clara University and spend the next five years in and out of the team. He played 22 times against opponents like Bayern Munich, Flamingo and Boca Juniors. Baicher earned two caps with the U.S national team in 1990 and 1991. His first cap came as a substitute for Bruce Murray in a February 13, 1990, victory over Bermuda. His second, and last, cap came a year later as a substitute for Fernando Clavijo in a February 1, 1991, loss to Switzerland.

== Coaching ==
Since retiring from professional soccer, Jeff Baicher started The Force Soccer Club in 2000. The Force Soccer Club has become nationally recognized for developing top talent for collegiate and professional soccer. Since 2015, the club has produced over 50 collegiate players annually and currently has an unprecedented 72 players competing professionally, both domestically and overseas. Baicher has worked with our Youth National Team, and Santa Clara University as assistant coach.
