= 1992 CONCACAF Champions' Cup =

28th edition of premier club football tournament organized by CONCACAF

Tournament details
- Dates: 4 October 1992 – 5 January 1993
- Teams: 4 (from 4 associations)

Final positions
- Champions: (Mexico) América (4th title)
- Runners-up: (Costa Rica) Alajuelense

Tournament statistics
- Matches played: 3
- Goals scored: 11 (3.67 per match)

The 1992 CONCACAF Champions' Cup, also known as the American Airlines Cup for sponsorship reasons, was the 28th edition of the annual international club football competition held in the CONCACAF region (North America, Central America and the Caribbean), the CONCACAF Champions' Cup. It determined that year's club champion of football in the CONCACAF region and was played from 1 February 1992 until 5 January 1993.

The teams were split in 2 zones (North/Central and Caribbean), each one qualifying two teams to the final tournament. All qualifying matches were played under the home/away match system, while the final was played in California. Both zones were also split into 2 groups, so one team of each qualified to the finals.

Unlike previous editions, the final was a single match played in Los Angeles (neutral venue), where Mexican Club América beat Costa Rican Liga Deportiva Alajuelense 1–0, therefore winning their four CONCACAF trophy. The Vancouver 86ers became the first Canadian team to qualify for the tournament, but ultimately withdrew before the first round.

== North/Central America Zone ==
=== Group 1 ===
Torneo Centroamericano de Concacaf 1992.

Pumas UNAM participates in the tournament

==== First round ====
19 February 1992 1st leg	Comunicaciones (Guatemala)	1–2	(Honduras) Motagua	Guatemala City, Guatemala
CST	Contreras		Miguel Seminario; Fabricio Pérez	Stadium: Estadio Cementos Progreso

15 March 1992 2nd leg	Motagua (Honduras)	0–0 (2–1 agg.)	(Guatemala) Comunicaciones	Tegucigalpa, Honduras
CST				Stadium: Estadio Tiburcio Carías Andino

26 February 1992 1st leg	Luis Ángel Firpo (El Salvador)	0–0	(Mexico) UNAM	San Salvador, El Salvador
CST				Stadium: Estadio Cuscatlán; Attendance: 15,000

31 March 1992 2nd leg	UNAM (Mexico)	0–1 (0–1 agg.)	(El Salvador) Luis Ángel Firpo	Los Angeles, United States
PST			Nildeson 34'	Stadium: LA Memorial Coliseum

23 March 1992 1st leg	Municipal (Guatemala)	1–1	(Costa Rica) Alajuelense	Guatemala City, Guatemala
CST	Juan Carlos Plata		(o.g.) Víctor Hugo Monzón	Stadium: Estadio Mateo Flores

28 March 1992 2nd leg	Alajuelense (Costa Rica)	2–1 (3–2 agg.)	(Guatemala) Municipal	Alajuela, Costa Rica
CST	Austín Berry; Richard Smith		Julio Rodas	Stadium: Estadio Alejandro Morera Soto

- Motagua, Luis Ángel Firpo and Alajuelense advanced to Second Round.

==== Second round ====
25 April 1992 1st leg	Alajuelense (Costa Rica)	3–1	(Honduras) Motagua	Alajuela, Costa Rica
CST	Smith; Durán		Pérez	Stadium: Estadio Alejandro Morera Soto

29 April 1992 2nd leg	Motagua (Honduras)	0–2 (1–5 agg.)	(Costa Rica) Alajuelense	Tegucigalpa, Honduras
CST			4' Víquez; 49' Arguedas	Stadium: Estadio Tiburcio Carías Andino; Attendance: 8,021

- Alajuelense advanced to Third Round. Luis Ángel Firpo on a bye.

==== Third round ====
Team 1	Agg.	Team 2	1st leg	2nd leg
Firpo (El Salvador)	2–2 (3–5 p)	(Costa Rica) Alajuelense	0–1	2–1

Firpo (El Salvador)	0-1	(Costa Rica) Alajuelense	Los Angeles, United States
		Rodolfo Richardson Smith 50'	Stadium: LA Memorial Coliseum

Alajuelense (Costa Rica)	1-2 (2-2 agg.)	(El Salvador) Firpo	Alajuela, Costa Rica
Victor Badilla 80'		Nildeson 44'; Marcelo Estrada 89'	Stadium: Estadio Ricardo Saprissa Aymá

=== Group 2 ===
==== First round ====
Team 1	Agg.	Team 2	1st leg	2nd leg
S.F. Bay Blackhawks (United States)	10–1	(Panama) Euro Kickers	10–0	0-1
La Victoria (Belize)	2–1	(Nicaragua) Diriangén	1–0	1–1
Cemcol-Crown (Belize)	1–3	(United States) Dallas Rockets	0–1	1–2
Real Estelí (Nicaragua)	1–7	(Panama) Tauro	0–2	1–5
Real España (Honduras)	3–1	(El Salvador) Águila	0–0	3–1
Saprissa (Costa Rica)	2–4	(Mexico) América	0–0	2–4
Hamilton International (Bermuda)	w/o*	(Canada) Vancouver 86ers		

- Vancouver 86ers withdrew before 1st leg

S.F. Bay Blackhawks (United States)	10–0	(Panama) Euro Kickers	San José, United States
Peter Isaac; Dominic Kinnear; Townsend Qin			Stadium: Spartan Stadium

S.F. Bay Blackhawks (United States)	0-1 (1-10 agg.)	(Panama) Euro Kickers	San José, United States
		(o.g.)	Stadium: Spartan Stadium

La Victoria (Belize)	1–0	(Nicaragua) Diriangén	Corozal Town, Belize
Goal			Stadium: Ricalde Stadium

Diriangén (Nicaragua)	1-1 (1-2 agg.)	(Belize) La Victoria	Diriamba, Nicaragua
Goal		Goal	Stadium: Estadio Cacique Diriangén

Cemcol-Crown Milpros FC (Belize)	0-1	(United States) Dallas Rockets	Belize City, Belize
		Eloy Salgado	Stadium: MCC Grounds

Dallas Rockets (United States)	2–1 (3-1 agg.)	(Belize) Cemcol-Crown Milpros FC	Tyler, United States
Kenny Latham; Diego Castro		Goal	Stadium: CHRISTUS Trinity Mother Frances Rose Stadium o Tyler's Rose Stadium

Tauro (Panama)	2–0	(Nicaragua) Real Estelí	Panama City, Panama
Piggott (pen); Molina (o.g.)			Stadium: Estadio La Pedregaleña

Real Estelí (Nicaragua)	1-5 (1-7 agg.)	(Panama) Tauro	Panama City, Panama
Goal		l TBD	Stadium: Estadio La Pedregaleña

March 22, 1992	Real España (Honduras)	0-0	(El Salvador) Águila	San Pedro Sula, Honduras
				Stadium: Estadio Francisco Morazan; Attendance: 5,731

Águila (El Salvador)	1–3 (1-3 agg.)	(Honduras) Real España	San Miguel, El Salvador
Hugo Coria		Luis Vallejo; Washington Hernandez; Ciro Castillo	Stadium: Estadio Juan Francisco Barraza

March 23, 1992	Saprissa (Costa Rica)	0–0	(Mexico) América	San Juan de Tibás, Costa Rica
				Stadium: Estadio Ricardo Saprissa Aymá

América (Mexico)	4–2 (4-2 agg.)	(Costa Rica) Saprissa	Mexico City, Mexico
Antonio Carlos Santos 5'; José Enrique Rodón 13'; Luis Roberto Alves 33' 59'		Benjamín Mayorga 64'; William Mejía 73'	Stadium: Estadio Azteca

==== Second round ====
Team 1	Agg.	Team 2	1st leg	2nd leg
S.F. Bay Blackhawks (United States)	5–2	(Belize) La Victoria	3–2	2–0
Dallas Rockets (United States)	6–1	(Bermuda) Hamilton International	4–0	2–1
Real España (Honduras)	bye			
América (Mexico)	bye			
Tauro (Panama)	bye			

- S.F. Bay Blackhawks and Dallas Rockets advance to the Third Round.

S.F. Bay Blackhawks (United States)	3-2	(Belize) La Victoria	San José, United States
Eric Wynalda; John Doyle; Dominic Kinnear		TBD; TBD	Stadium: Spartan Stadium

La Victoria (Belize)	0-2 (2-5 agg.)	(United States) S.F. Bay Blackhawks	Belize City, Belize
		Dave Salzwedel; Eric Wynalda	Stadium: MCC Grounds

Dallas Rockets (United States)	4–0	(Bermuda) Hamilton International	Richardson, United States
Diego Castro; Patrick Krejs; Willie Molano (o.g.)			Stadium: Eagle Mustang Stadium

Hamilton International (Bermuda)	1–2 (1-6 agg.)	(United States) Dallas Rockets	Hamilton, Bermuda
Paul Towlson		Eddie Radwanski; Eloy Salgado	Stadium: Bermuda National Stadium

==== Third round ====
Team 1	Agg.	Team 2	1st leg	2nd leg
Dallas Rockets (United States)	5 - 3	(Panama) Tauro F.C.	3 - 1	2 - 2
S.F. Bay Blackhawks (United States)	6 - 0	(Honduras) Real España	3 - 0	3 - 0
Club América (Mexico)	bye			

- Dallas Rockets and S.F. Bay Blackhawks advance to the Fourth Round.

Tauro F.C. (Panama)	1–3	(United States) Dallas Rockets	Richardson, United States
Goal		David Hudgell; Eloy Salgado	Stadium: Eagle Mustang Stadium

Dallas Rockets (United States)	2–2 (5-3 agg.)	(Panama) Tauro F.C.	Tyler, United States
Eloy Salgado; Frank Velez		Noel Gutierrez; Juan Palacios	Stadium: CHRISTUS Trinity Mother Frances Rose Stadium o Tyler's Rose Stadium; Attendance: 3,200

Real España (Honduras)	0-3	(United States) S.F. Bay Blackhawks	San José, United States
		Goal	Stadium: Spartan Stadium

S.F. Bay Blackhawks (United States)	3-0 (6-0 agg.)	(Honduras) Real España	San José, United States
Joey Leonetti; Mike Masters; Derek Van Rheene			Stadium: Spartan Stadium

==== Fourth round ====
Team 1	Agg.	Team 2	1st leg	2nd leg
Dallas Rockets (United States)	2 - 7	(Mexico) Club América	1 - 2	1 - 5
S.F. Bay Blackhawks (United States)	bye			

- Club América advance to the Fifth Round.

Dallas Rockets (United States)	1–2	(Mexico) Club América	Dallas, United States
Eloy Salgado		Hugo Sanchez; José Alves Zague	Stadium: Franklin Field; Attendance: 8,500

Club América (Mexico)	5-1 (7-2 agg.)	(United States) Dallas Rockets	Mexico City, Mexico
José Alves Zague; TBD; TBD		David Hudgell	Stadium: Estadio Azteca

==== Fifth round ====
Team 1	Agg.	Team 2	1st leg	2nd leg
Club América (Mexico)	4 - 3	(United States) S.F. Bay Blackhawks	3 - 1	1 - 2

- Club América advance to the CONCACAF Final Series.

Club América (Mexico)	3-1	(United States) S.F. Bay Blackhawks	Mexico City, Mexico
Hugo Sanchez		Peter Isaacs	Stadium: Estadio Azteca

S.F. Bay Blackhawks (United States)	2–1 (3-4 agg.)	(Mexico) Club América	San José, United States
Goal		Goal	Stadium: Spartan Stadium

== Caribbean Zone ==
=== Group 1 ===
Preliminary Round

Team 1	Agg.	Team 2	1st leg	2nd leg
San Cristobal Bancredicard (Dominican Republic)	5 - 4	(United States Virgin Islands) Unique F.C.	2 - 1	3 - 3

- San Cristobal Bancredicard advance to the first round.

San Cristobal Bancredicard (Dominican Republic)	2-1	(United States Virgin Islands) Unique F.C.

Unique F.C. (United States Virgin Islands)	3-3 (4-5 agg.)	(Dominican Republic) San Cristobal Bancredicard

First Round

Team 1	Agg.	Team 2	1st leg	2nd leg
RCA (Aruba)	5 - 7	(Netherlands Antilles) RKVFC Sithoc	3 - 2	2 - 5
Strikers F.C. (Cayman Islands)	0 - 7	(Martinique) Aiglon du Lamentin	0 - 0	0 - 7
SV Transvaal (Suriname)	2 - 1	(Trinidad and Tobago) Trintoc F.C.	2 - 0	0 - 1
San Cristobal Bancredicard (Dominican Republic)	3 - 4	(Guadeloupe) Solidarité Scolaire (Baie-Mahault)	3 - 3	0 - 1

- RKVFC Sithoc, Aiglon du Lamentin, SV Transvaal and Solidarité Scolaire advance to the second round.

RCA (Aruba)	3-2	(Netherlands Antilles) RKVFC Sithoc

RKVFC Sithoc (Netherlands Antilles)	5–2 (7-5 agg.)	(Aruba) RCA

Strikers F.C. (Cayman Islands)	0–0	(Martinique) Aiglon du Lamentin

Aiglon du Lamentin (Martinique)	7-0 (7-0 agg.)	(Cayman Islands) Strikers F.C.

4 April 1992	SV Transvaal (Suriname)	2–0	(Trinidad and Tobago) Trintoc F.C.	Paramaribo, Suriname
	Eric Godliep x 2			Stadium: Andre Kamperveen Stadion; Attendance: 3,800

Trintoc F.C. (Trinidad and Tobago)	1-0 (1-2 agg.)	(Suriname) SV Transvaal

San Cristobal Bancredicard (Dominican Republic)	3-3	(Guadeloupe) Solidarité Scolaire (Baie-Mahault)

Solidarité Scolaire (Baie-Mahault) (Guadeloupe)	1-0 (4-3 agg.)	(Dominican Republic) San Cristobal Bancredicard

Second Round

Team 1	Agg.	Team 2	1st leg	2nd leg
RKVFC Sithoc (Netherlands Antilles)	2 - 2; 3-2 (Pen.)	(Suriname) SV Transvaal	2 - 1	0 - 1
Aiglon du Lamentin (Martinique)	2 - 1	(Guadeloupe) Solidarité Scolaire (Baie-Mahault)	1 - 0	1 - 1

- RKVFC Sithoc and Aiglon du Lamentin advance to the third round.

RKVFC Sithoc (Netherlands Antilles)	2-1	(Suriname) SV Transvaal

SV Transvaal (Suriname)	1-0 (3-3 agg.)	(Netherlands Antilles) RKVFC Sithoc

Aiglon du Lamentin (Martinique)	1–0	(Guadeloupe) Solidarité Scolaire (Baie-Mahault)

Solidarité Scolaire (Baie-Mahault) (Guadeloupe)	1-1 (1-2 agg.)	(Martinique) Aiglon du Lamentin

Third Round

Team 1	Agg.	Team 2	1st leg	2nd leg
RKVFC Sithoc (Netherlands Antilles)	3 - 3; 2-4 (Pen.)	(Martinique) Aiglon du Lamentin	2 - 2	1 - 1

- Aiglon du Lamentin advance to the CONCACAF Final Series.

RKVFC Sithoc (Netherlands Antilles)	2-2	(Martinique)

1-1 (3-3 (Pen 4-3) agg.)	(Netherlands Antilles) RKVFC Sithoc

=== Group 2 ===
Preliminary Round

Team 1	Agg.	Team 2	1st leg	2nd leg
Rockmaster F.C. (United States Virgin Islands)	w/o*	(Puerto Rico) Guayama F.C.		

- Guayama F.C. withdrew.*
- Rockmaster F.C. advance to the first round.

First Round

Team 1	Agg.	Team 2	1st leg	2nd leg
ASC Le Geldar (French Guiana)	1 - 2	(Suriname) SV Robinhood	1 - 0	0 - 2
CRKSV Jong Colombia (Netherlands Antilles)	2 - 2; 2-4 (Pen.)	(Trinidad and Tobago) Mayaro United	1 - 0	1 - 2
Union Sportive Robert (Martinique)	10 - 1	(United States Virgin Islands) Rockmaster F.C.	6 - 0	4 - 1
L'Etoile de Morne-à-l'Eau (Guadeloupe)	w/o*	(Cayman Islands) Scholars F.C.		

- Scholars FC withdrew before 1st leg*
- SV Robinhood, Mayaro United, US Robert and L'Etoile de Morne-à-l'Eau advance to the second round.

ASC Le Geldar (French Guiana)	1–0	(Suriname) SV Robinhood

SV Robinhood (Suriname)	2–0 (2-1 agg.)	(French Guiana) ASC Le Geldar

CRKSV Jong Colombia (Netherlands Antilles)	1–0	(Trinidad and Tobago) Mayaro United

Mayaro United (Trinidad and Tobago)	2–1 (2-2 (pen 4-2) agg.)	(Netherlands Antilles) CRKSV Jong Colombia

Union Sportive Robert (Martinique)	6–0	(United States Virgin Islands) Rockmaster F.C.

Rockmaster F.C. (United States Virgin Islands)	1-4 (1-10 agg.)	(Martinique) Union Sportive Robert

Second Round

Team 1	Agg.	Team 2	1st leg	2nd leg
Union Sportive Robert (Martinique)	1 - 2	(Guadeloupe) L'Etoile de Morne-à-l'Eau	1 - 1	0 - 1
SV Robinhood (Suriname)	2 - 1	(Trinidad and Tobago) Mayaro United	2 - 0	0 - 1

- L'Etoile de Morne-à-l'Eau and SV Robinhood advance to the third round.

Union Sportive Robert (Martinique)	1–1	(Guadeloupe) L'Etoile de Morne-à-l'Eau

L'Etoile de Morne-à-l'Eau (Guadeloupe)	1-0 (2-1 agg.)	(Martinique) Union Sportive Robert

SV Robinhood (Suriname)	2–0	(Trinidad and Tobago) Mayaro United

Mayaro United (Trinidad and Tobago)	1-0 (1-2 agg.)	(Suriname) SV Robinhood

Third Round

Team 1	Agg.	Team 2	1st leg	2nd leg
L'Etoile de Morne-à-l'Eau (Guadeloupe)	3 - 4	(Suriname) SV Robinhood	3 - 1	0 - 3

- SV Robinhood advance to the CONCACAF Final Series.

L'Etoile de Morne-à-l'Eau (Guadeloupe)	3-1	(Suriname) SV Robinhood

SV Robinhood (Suriname)	3-0 (4-3 agg.)	(Guadeloupe) L'Etoile de Morne-à-l'Eau

== Semi-finals ==
October 7, 1992

Played in Estadio Corregidora - Santiago de Querétaro, (MEX)

Team 1	Score	Team 2
Club América (Mexico); Alejandro Domínguez 7'; Luís Roberto Alves 29'; Gonzalo Farfán 35'; Germán Martellotto 41', 82'; Hugo Sánchez 46' (Pen.); José Enrique Rodón 88'	7 - 0	(Suriname) SV Robinhood

Played in Estadio Corregidora - Santiago de Querétaro, (MEX)

Team 1	Score	Team 2
L.D. Alajuelense (Costa Rica); Victor Badilla; Luis Quirós	2 - 1	(Martinique) Aiglon du Lamentin; Fondelot

== Final ==
1992 CONCACAF Champions' Cup Final
January 5, 1993
Final

América (Mexico)	1–0	(Costa Rica) Alajuelense
Sánchez 67'	Report

Santa Ana Stadium, Santa Ana, California
Attendance: 8,000
Referee: Majid Bay (Trinidad and Tobago)

Team details

América
Alajuelense

GK	12	(Mexico) Alejandro García
DF	2	(Mexico) Juan Hernández
DF	4	(Mexico) Enrique Rodón
DF	23	(Argentina) Oscar Ruggeri
DF	6	(Uruguay) Cesilio de los Santos
MF		(Mexico) Raúl Lara
MF	7	(Mexico) Gonzalo Farfán
MF	11	(Mexico) Francisco Uribe	(substituted off) a'
MF	10	(Argentina) Germán Martellotto
FW	9	(Mexico) Hugo Sánchez
FW	17	(Mexico) Zague	Sent off (straight red)
Substitutions:
MF		(Mexico) Alejandro Domínguez	(substituted on) a'
Manager:
(Argentina) Miguel Ángel López

GK	(Costa Rica)
DF	(Costa Rica)
DF	(Costa Rica)
DF	(Costa Rica)
DF	(Costa Rica)
MF	(Costa Rica)
MF	(Costa Rica)
FW	(Costa Rica)
FW	(Costa Rica)
FW	(Costa Rica)
FW	(Costa Rica)
Manager:
(Czechoslovakia) Ivan Mráz

== Champion ==
CONCACAF Champions' Cup
1992 Winners
(Mexico)
Club América
Fourth title
