= Joey Leonetti =

American soccer player (born 1970)

Personal information
- Full name: Joe Leonetti
- Date of birth: May 25, 1970 (age 56)
- Place of birth: Portland, Oregon, United States
- Height: 5 ft 9 in (1.75 m)
- Positions: Forward; midfielder

Youth career
- 1988–1991: Portland Pilots

Senior career*
Years	Team	Apps	(Gls)
1988	Portland Timbers		
1992	San Francisco Bay Blackhawks	8	(2)
1993–1995	Portland Pride (indoor)		
1996	Seattle Sounders	16	(3)
1997	Portland Pride (indoor)		
1998	Portland Pythons (indoor)		
1999	Willamette Valley Firebirds		

International career
1992–1996	United States	2	(0)
1992	United States U23	4	(2)

Managerial career
- 1997–2006: West Linn High School
- * Club domestic league appearances and goals

Joe Leonetti (born May 25, 1970) is an American former soccer player who played as a forward and midfielder. His career began in 1988 with F.C. Portland and ended in 1999 with the Willamette Valley Firebirds. He also earned two caps with the U.S. national team in 1992 and 1996.

== High school and college ==
Leonetti was born in Portland, Oregon. He attended Gladstone High School where he was the 1987 Oregon State High School player of the Year as a senior. He scored a total of 123 goals during his prep career. After high school, he attended the University of Portland where he played from 1988 to 1991 under coach Clive Charles. In 1988, his freshman year, he was part of the Portland team which went to the NCAA Final Four only to lose to champion Indiana. During his four seasons with the Pilots, Leonetti scored thirty-seven goals, and is fourth on the school's all-time scoring list. He tops the school's season and career assists records with 14 and 36, respectively. He was a third team All-American in 1989. He graduated with a bachelor's degree in biology. He was inducted into the University of Portland Athletic Hall of Fame in 2001.

== WSA/APSL ==
In 1988, while still in college, Leonetti spent the 1988 Western Soccer Alliance season with F.C. Portland, a local semi-pro team. Following his graduation from the University of Portland in 1992, Leonetti signed with the San Francisco Bay Blackhawks of the American Professional Soccer League (APSL) which had been formed by the merger of the WSA and American Soccer League in 1990. While he played in only eight games, scoring two goals, during league play, he added another three goals in CONCACAF Champions' Cup play as the Blackhawks went to the semifinals, only to fall to eventual champions Club América. He also scored a goal for the Blackhawks in the first round of the Professional Cup. He played with the national team in September 1992, but then tore his anterior cruciate ligament (ACL) which kept him from playing for nearly a year.

In 1993, Leonetti joined the local Portland Pride of the Continental Indoor Soccer League, a summer indoor league. He played in Portland through the 1995 season. In February 1996, the Los Angeles Galaxy drafted Leonetti in the 10th round (94 overall) of the 1996 MLS Inaugural Player Draft. The Galaxy cut him in pre-season and Leonetti moved north to sign with the Seattle Sounders of the A-League (renamed APSL). That season, the team won the league title and Leonetti was named the playoff MVP. In 1997, Leonetti decided to try out for MLS again. He attended the MLS combine, but tore the ACL in his left knee, putting him out of action for several months. That summer, he re-joined the Portland Pride for the team's last season.

The Pride and its league, the CISL, folded at the end of the 1997 season. However, the team's ownership decided to re-create the team as the Portland Pythons and entered it into the indoor Premier Soccer Alliance in 1998. Leonetti remained with the Pythons through the end of the season. In 1999, he played his final year of soccer, this time with the Willamette Valley Firebirds of the fourth division USL Premier Development League. The Firebirds went to the PDL semifinals that season.

Leonetti left soccer in 2000 to work for Fluid Logic, but he decided to return to the field in 2001 with the Portland Timbers. During a pre-season game against the University of Portland, he blew out his Achilles tendon. While he again tried out for the team in 2002, he was cut and retired from playing professionally.

== National team ==
Leonetti gained his first of two caps in a 2–0 win over Canada on September 3, 1992, when he came on for Peter Vermes in the 61st minutes. He was also selected later in 1992 by then coach Bora Milutinovic for a match against AS Monaco and as a member of the squad for the Intercontinental Championship for the King Fahd Cup in Saudi Arabia. Leonetti did not see field time in matches against Saudi Arabia and the Ivory Coast. He earned his last cap for the national team in a 4–1 loss to Peru on October 16, 1996. Leonetti also represented the United States on the U-23 National Team as they prepared for the upcoming Barcelona Olympics in 1992. He earned four international caps, while appearing in a total of 11 matches. He tallied two international goals in his four caps, getting on the score sheet against Canada in a friendly and Yugoslavia at the Toulon Festival "Espoirs".

== Coaching ==
Leonetti coached the West Linn High School (Portland, Oregon) girls' soccer team from 1997 to 2006.
