= Alberto Cruz (soccer) =

American soccer player

Personal information
- Full name: Alberto O. Cruz
- Date of birth: July 10, 1971 (age 55)
- Place of birth: United States
- Position: Midfielder

College career
| Years | Team | Apps | (Gls) |
| 1989–91 | Santa Clara Broncos | | |

Senior career*
| Years | Team | Apps | (Gls) |
| 1988 | San Jose Earthquakes | | |
| 1994 | San Jose Grizzlies (indoor) | 14 | (3) |
| 1995 | San Francisco United All Blacks | | |
| 1996 | Sacramento Scorpions | | |
| 1997–98 | San Francisco Seals | | |

International career
| 1991 | United States | 1 | (0) |
- * Club domestic league appearances and goals

Alberto O. Cruz (born July 10, 1971) was an American soccer player who earned one cap with the U.S. national team and played professionally in the Continental Indoor Soccer League and USISL.

== Player ==
=== Youth ===
Cruz graduated from Archbishop Riordan High School in 1989. He was the 1989 West Catholic Athletic League Offensive Player of the Year. and was inducted into the Riordan Athletic Hall of Fame in 2006. He also played with the San Francisco United Soccer Club. After graduating from Riordan, he entered Santa Clara University where he played on the men's soccer team from 1989 to 1991. In 1989, the Broncos shared the NCAA Men's Division I Soccer Championship with the Virginia Cavaliers and finished runner-up in 1991. Cruz holds a number of school records and league honors. He graduated with a bachelor's degree in civil engineering in 1994.

=== Club ===
While still in high school, Cruz spent the 1988 Western Soccer Alliance season with the San Jose Earthquakes. He was named a first-team All-Star. In 1994, he played for the San Jose Grizzlies in the Continental Indoor Soccer League, with the San Jose Oaks and the San Francisco All Blacks. In 1996, he played for the Sacramento Scorpions of USISL. Cruz played semi-professional soccer in the San Francisco Soccer Football League in 2000 and 2001 with Mezcala and 2003 with San Francisco A.C.

=== International ===
Cruz earned one cap with the U.S. national team in a 1–0 win over Jamaica on September 14, 1991. He came on for Jorge Acosta at halftime.

== Other careers ==
In 1996, Cruz became a program manager with the San Francisco International Airport. In December 2006, he moved to Mead and Hunt as an airport engineer. He now works as an airport engineer at the Bob Hope Airport.

In September 1998, Cruz became the head coach of the Archbishop, Riordan High School's soccer team. He held that position until March 2002. In May 2007, he became a coach with the Petaluma Youth Soccer League.
