= San Jose Grizzlies =

- Full name: San Jose Grizzlies
- Founded: 1993
- Dissolved: 1996
- Stadium: San Jose Arena; San Jose, California
- Capacity: 18,130
- Owner: Milan Mandarić
- Manager: Bob McNab
- League: Continental Indoor Soccer League

The San Jose Grizzlies were a professional indoor soccer team based in San Jose, California, United States. The team was founded on November 24, 1993, and played in the Continental Indoor Soccer League (CISL). After playing in the 1994 and 1995 CISL seasons, the Grizzlies folded in February 1996. The team played at San Jose Arena, which they shared with the San Jose Sharks, and had an average attendance of 3,712 across both seasons.

== Notable players ==
- Preki (1994–95)
- Bernie Lilavois (1994–95)
- Randy Prescott (1994)
- Rich Ryerson (1994–95)
- Stan Stamenkovic (1994)
- Kevin Hundelt (1994)
- Neathan Gibson (1994)
- Alberto Cruz (1994)
- Jeff Baicher (1995)
- Troy Dayak (1995)
- Rhett Harty (1995)
- Thompson Usiyan (1995)
- Nikola Vignjevic (1995)

== Year-by-year ==
Year	Record	Regular season	Playoffs	Avg. attendance
1994	12–16	6th Western	Out of playoffs	4,010
1995	15–13	2nd Western	Quarterfinals	3,414

== Honors ==
CISL MVP

- 1995 Preki
