= Dave Salzwedel =

American soccer player and coach

Personal information
- Date of birth: June 15, 1968 (age 58)
- Place of birth: Thousand Oaks, California, United States
- Height: 6 ft 1 in (1.85 m)
- Position: Goalkeeper

Youth career
- 1986–1989: Cal Lutheran

Senior career*
Years	Team	Apps	(Gls)
1992	San Francisco Bay Blackhawks	2	(0)
1993	→ San Jose Hawks		
1995	Los Angeles Soccer Club		
1996–1997	San Jose Clash	34	(0)

Managerial career
- 1990–1995: Cal Lutheran (assistant)
- * Club domestic league appearances and goals

Dave Salzwedel (born June 15, 1968, in Thousand Oaks, California) is a retired U.S. soccer goalkeeper who played two seasons in Major League Soccer with the San Jose Clash. He also played one season in the American Professional Soccer League and USISL.

Salzwedel attended Calabasas High School. He then played collegiate soccer for California Lutheran University where he was a two-time NAIA All American. He was inducted into the school's Hall of Fame in 2003. He tried out with the San Diego Sockers, but was cut in the final round of the trials. He returned to Cal Lutheran and worked as an assistant coach for the next six seasons. In 1992, tried out with the San Francisco Bay Blackhawks of the American Professional Soccer League at the suggestion of Eric Wynalda, a childhood friend. He spent most of the season as a backup to Mark Dougherty, but played two games when Dougherty was injured. In 1993, the owner of the Blackhawks moved the team to the lower USISL and renamed it the San Jose Hawks. Following the season, the team folded. Salzwedel continued to play for amateur clubs, most notably the Los Angeles Soccer Club, until Major League Soccer began holding trials at the end of 1995. Salzwedel impressed the scouts enough to be drafted in the eighth round of the 1996 MLS Inaugural Player Draft by the San Jose Clash. Salzwedel played two seasons before being released by the Clash. He was drafted in the third round of the 1998 MLS Supplemental Draft by the New England Revolution, but was released during the season.

Salzwedel currently coaches boys and girls soccer at the Oakwood School in Morgan Hill, California. He has also opened two camps, one for soccer and one for all sports.
