= Kevin Hundelt =

American soccer player (born 1967)

Personal information
- Date of birth: December 30, 1967 (age 58)
- Place of birth: St. Louis, Missouri, U.S.
- Height: 5 ft 9 in (1.75 m)
- Positions: Defender; midfielder

College career
Years	Team	Apps	(Gls)
1986	SIU Edwardsville Cougars		

Senior career*
Years	Team	Apps	(Gls)
1987–1988	St. Louis Steamers (indoor)	30	(3)
1988–1991	Kansas City Comets (indoor)	142	(42)
1991–1992	St. Louis Storm (indoor)	38	(10)
1992–1999	St. Louis Ambush (indoor)	231	(112)
1994	San Jose Grizzlies (indoor)	23	(15)
1999–2001	St. Louis Steamers (indoor)		

International career
1987	United States U20	1	(0)

Managerial career
- 1998–1999: St. Louis Ambush (assistant)
- * Club domestic league appearances and goals

Kevin Hundelt (born December 30, 1967) is an American retired soccer player who spent his entire professional career playing in indoor leagues. These include the first Major Indoor Soccer League and second Major Indoor Soccer League, National Professional Soccer League and Continental Indoor Soccer League. He was the 1999 NPSL Defender of the Year and also earned one cap with the United States men's national under-20 soccer team in 1987.

== Player ==
=== Youth ===
Hundelt graduated from St. Thomas Aquinas-Mercy High School where he led school's soccer team to the 1985 Missouri State High School Soccer Championship. Hundelt was the 1986 Gatorade National High School Player of the Year. He then attended Southern Illinois University Edwardsville where he played one year on the men's soccer team.

=== Professional ===
In fall of 1987, Hundelt turned professional with the St. Louis Steamers of the Major Indoor Soccer League. He spent the first half of the season on the reserve squad, but gained his first game in January 1988. After that, he became a regular with the first team. When the Steamers folded at the end of the season, Hundelt signed with the Kansas City Comets. After playing three seasons with the Comets, Hundelt signed as a free agent with the St. Louis Storm in July 1991. When both the Storm and the league collapsed at the end of the season. Hundelt moved to the St. Louis Ambush of the National Professional Soccer League where he spent seven seasons. He was the 1999 NPSL Defender of the Year. He gained the award by becoming the first player in league history to finish in the top five in both blocked shots and assists in one season. In 1994, Hundelt spent the summer indoor season with the San Jose Grizzlies of the Continental Indoor Soccer League. After his standout 1998–1999 season, the Ambush both passed on Hundelt as the team's new coach and asked him to take a pay cut. He, therefore, decided to seek another team. On October 6, 1999, he signed with the St. Louis Steamers of the World Indoor Soccer League. On July 30, 2003, the KiXX traded Hundelt, along with Mark Moser, Droo Callahan and Matt DeJong to the Steamers in exchange for Cesidio Colasante and Joe Santana. There is no indication that he played for either the KiXX or the Steamers.

=== National team ===
In 1987, Hundelt played at least one game with the U-20 team in a 1–0 loss to Chile.

== Coach ==
In the fall of 1998, the St. Louis Ambush named Hundelt as a player-assistant coach. In the summer of 1999, the Ambush began looking for a new head coach. After initially saying that Hundelt would most likely be selected for the position, the team ownership went with Jamie Swanner.

== Yearly awards ==
- NPSL Defender of the Year (1999)
- NPSL All-Star Team (1999)
