= Paul Holocher =

American soccer player and coach

Personal information
- Full name: Paul Holocher
- Date of birth: May 24, 1969 (age 57)
- Place of birth: Seattle, Washington, United States
- Height: 5 ft 10 in (1.78 m)
- Position: Midfielder

College career
Years	Team	Apps	(Gls)
1988–1991	Santa Clara University		

Senior career*
Years	Team	Apps	(Gls)
1991–1992	San Francisco Bay Blackhawks	18	(3)
1993	San Jose Hawks		
1993–1994	Admira Wacker	1	(0)
1994	Fort Lauderdale Strikers		
1995	Monterey Bay Jaguars		
1996	San Jose Clash	4	(1)
1997–1998	California Jaguars	30	(5)

International career^{‡}
1996	United States	1	(0)

Managerial career
- 1999–2006: UC Santa Cruz
- 2006–2013: Cal Poly San Luis Obispo
- * Club domestic league appearances and goals as of 16 March 2007 ‡ National team caps and goals as of 9 June 2007

Paul Holocher (born May 24, 1969, in Seattle, Washington ) is a former U.S. soccer midfielder who played in Austria and Major League Soccer. He also earned one cap with the U.S. national team in 1996. He was the Academy Director for MLS club Houston Dynamo. He is currently the Head of Coaches and Methodology at Christchurch United.

== College ==
Holocher attended Santa Clara University where he played for future national team coach Steve Sampson from 1988 to 1991. In 1989, the Broncos were NCAA co-champions with the University of Virginia. In 1990, Holocher was a third team All-American and ended his four seasons with the Broncos as the team's all-time career scorer.

== Professional ==
In 1991, Holocher turned professional with the San Francisco Bay Blackhawks of the American Professional Soccer League (APSL). In 1991, the Blackhawks won the APSL championship. In 1992, the Blackhawks went 8–8. The owner decided to take the team to a lower division and so in 1993 the renamed San Jose Hawks spent one year in the USISL. The San Jose Hawks won their division and went to the Sizzlin’ Six tournament where Holocher was named MVP. Despite this success the team folded at the end of 1993.

Holocher moved to Europe where he signed with Austrian First Division club Admira Wacker. However, after spending only the 1993–1994 season in Austria, Holocher was back in the U.S. with the Fort Lauderdale Strikers (APSL). The Strikers folded at the end of the season and Holocher moved back west to the Monterey Bay Jaguars (USISL) which played in Santa Clara, California. The Jaguars won their division and went to the Sizzlin’ Nine tournament.

In February 1996, the San Jose Clash of Major League Soccer (MLS) selected Holocher in the fifth round (forty-eighth overall) of the league's Inaugural Player Draft. In April 1996 Holcher injured his knee and did not play again until the post-season. He played in five more games and scored one goal for the Clash. Holocher began the 1997 season with the Clash, but they waived him on April 10, 1997. Holocher returned to the Jaguars, now known as the California Jaguars.

In 1998, the Chicago Fire of MLS picked Holocher in the second round (sixteenth overall) of the Supplemental Draft but did not sign him.

== National team ==
In 1996, the national team players went on strike just prior to a game in Peru. Holocher was called into the U.S. national team for the game, a 4–1 loss to Peru on October 16, 1996. Holocher was a second-half substitute for Ted Eck at forward.

== Coaching ==
In 1999, Holocher entered the coaching ranks both at the collegiate and the youth soccer levels. He founded the Catalyst Soccer Club that year and coached in the Premier Futbol Club of Santa Cruz County. In 1999, the University of California, Santa Cruz (UC Santa Cruz) also hired Holocher as its NCAA Division III men's soccer coach. In January 2006, Holocher left UC Santa Cruz to become the head coach at NCAA Division I Cal Poly San Luis Obispo. In his eight seasons at UC Santa Cruz, Holocher compiled a 109–24–8 record. He also took the Slugs to the 2004 Division III championship game where his team lost 4–0 to Messiah. In 2004, Holocher was inducted into the Santa Clara University Athletic Hall of Fame.

Recently he was hired as a youth coach at the U-18 level for the San Jose Earthquakes, his former team. Source

He resigned from Cal Poly in August 2014.

He spent years working with the San Jose Earthquakes Academy for 3 years before joining the Houston Dynamo Academy in July 2018 as the Academy Director.
