= Justin Wall =

American soccer player

Personal information
- Full name: Justin Wall
- Place of birth: United States
- Position: Forward

Youth career
- 1988–1991: Westmont College

Senior career*
Years	Team	Apps	(Gls)
1992	San Francisco Bay Blackhawks	4	(1)
1993	San Jose Hawks		
- * Club domestic league appearances and goals as of 17:47, 24 February 2007 (UTC) ‡ National team caps and goals as of 7 December 2006

Justin Wall is a former U.S. soccer forward who attended Westmont College, a small school which played in the NAIA. In his four seasons with the Warriors, Wall helped the team to the 1989 NAIA Final Four. On an individual level, Wall was a three time All American and ended his career with the Warriors with 23 assists.

In 1992, Wall signed with the San Francisco Bay Blackhawks of the American Professional Soccer League. However, he saw time in only four games for a total of 138 minutes. In 1993, he became a regular on the team, now renamed the San Jose Hawks which now played in the U.S. Interregional Soccer League (USISL). The Hawks took the Pacific Division title, making the Sizzling Six post-season tournament. Wall was a Sizzling Six All Star that season.

He later joined the San Jose Clash front office, working ticket sales and promotions.

Westmont inducted Wall into its Athletic Hall of Fame in 2006.
