= Bernie Lilavois =

American soccer forward (born 1970)

Personal information
- Full name: Bernard Lilavois
- Date of birth: August 31, 1970 (age 56)
- Place of birth: Far Rockaway, New York, United States
- Height: 5 ft 11 in (1.80 m)
- Position: Forward

Team information
- Current team: Ontario Fury

Youth career
- 1988: Cal State Northridge

Senior career*
Years	Team	Apps	(Gls)
1991–1992	San Francisco Bay Blackhawks	14	(5)
1993	Ayr United		
1994–1995	San Jose Grizzlies (indoor)	35	(39)
1995–1997	Anaheim Splash (indoor)	70	(81)
1995–1998	Cincinnati Silverbacks (indoor)	74	(97)
1998	Charleston Battery	17	(3)
1998–1999	Buffalo Blizzard (indoor)	32	(31)
1999–2001	Harrisburg Heat (indoor)	81	(119)
1999	Portland Pythons (indoor)	16	(27)
2000	Connecticut Wolves	8	(2)
2003	Cleveland Force (indoor)	3	(0)
2005–2008	Stockton Cougars (indoor)	57	(37)
2011–2013	Anaheim Bolts (indoor)	8	(6)
2013–2014	Ontario Fury (indoor)	8	(5)

International career
2000	United States (futsal)	5	(1)

Managerial career
- 2007–2009: Stockton Cougars
- 2011–2012: Anaheim Bolts
- * Club domestic league appearances and goals

Bernie Lilavois (born August 31, 1970, in Far Rockaway, New York) is an American soccer forward who played two seasons in the American Professional Soccer League, one in the USISL, one in the USL A-League, four in the Continental Indoor Soccer League, six in the National Professional Soccer League, and four in the Major Indoor Soccer League. He was the head coach of the Stockton Cougars in the Professional Arena Soccer League and the head coach of the US National Arena Soccer Team. In November 2024, Lilavois was named commissioner of Major League Indoor Soccer.

== Player ==
=== Youth ===
Lilavois grew up in Buena Park, California. He attended La Salle High School in Pasadena, California where he holds the school's record for goal scoring. He is a member of the La Salle Hall of Fame. Lilavois then attended Cal State Northridge, playing on the men's soccer team in 1988. That year, Northridge finished runner up to Florida Tech in the NCAA Division II championship game.

=== Professional ===
In 1991, Lilavois signed with the San Francisco Bay Blackhawks in the American Professional Soccer League winning the 1991 title with the team. He then had a brief stint with Ayr United in the Scottish Football League. In 1994, Lilavois signed with the San Jose Grizzlies of the Continental Indoor Soccer League. The CISL played a summer indoor season. In 1995, he began the season with the Grizzlies, playing seven games before being traded to the Anaheim Splash on September 1, 1995. He would continue to play for Anaheim through the 1997 CISL season. That year was his most productive for the team, netting 44 goals in 27 games as he was named to the CISL All Star team. Following the 1997 season, the CISL collapsed. In the fall of 1995, Lilavois signed with the Cincinnati Silverbacks in the National Professional Soccer League which played a winter indoor season. He played only three games for the Silverbacks that season, but scored 31 in 31 games in 1996–1997 and 66 goals in 40 games in 1997–1998. In the summer of 1998, he played for the Charleston Battery in the USISL. The Silverbacks had folded during the summer of 1998 so Lilavois signed with the Buffalo Blizzard for the 1998–1999 season. He was traded to the Harrisburg Heat in March 1999. He went on to play another two season in Harrisburg, scoring a total of 119 goals in 81 games. In the spring of 1999, he joined the Portland Pythons in the World Indoor Soccer League. In the summer of 2000, Lilavois returned to outdoor soccer with the Connecticut Wolves in the USL A-League. Lilavois then moved to the Cleveland Force for the 2002–2003 Major Indoor Soccer League season. After he played only three games in February and March 2003, he retired. In October 2005, the expansion Stockton Cougars of MISL signed Lilavois as a free agent. He played through the end of the 2006–2007 season, then was forced to retire from playing when he became the head coach. However, he returned on February 23, 2008, when Stockton was hit with several injuries.

=== National team ===
In 2000, Lilavois played for the U.S. National Futsal team which took third at the CONCACAF championship. He scored one goal in five games.

== Coach ==
On February 17, 2006, the Cougars elevated Lilavois from player to player-coach. League rules prohibited a coach from playing, so Lilavois was not allowed to be the official coach. When he became the official coach at the end of the season, he was forced to retire from playing, but was re-instated by the league commissioner when the Cougars were hit with several injuries. In addition to the Cougars, Lilavois also coaches the United States National Arena Soccer Team.

In 2011, the Professional Arena Soccer League announced a new team in the league, the Anaheim Bolts. Lilavois was named head coach and managing partner. In 2013, he helped found a new PASL franchise, the Ontario Fury, as the Anaheim team was put up for sale and allowed to go dormant.
