= Laurie Calloway =

English football player and manager (born 1945)

Personal information
- Full name: Laurence John Calloway
- Date of birth: 17 June 1945 (age 81)
- Place of birth: Birmingham, England
- Position: Defender

Senior career*
Years	Team	Apps	(Gls)
1962–1964	Wolverhampton Wanderers	0	(0)
1964–1968	Rochdale	162	(4)
1968–1970	Blackburn Rovers	25	(1)
1970–1971	Southport	45	(7)
1971–1972	York City	55	(3)
1972–1974	Shrewsbury Town	82	(3)
1974–1977	San Jose Earthquakes	71	(3)
1978	Southern California Lazers	5	(0)
1979	San Jose Earthquakes	4	(0)

Managerial career
- 1978: Southern California Lazers
- 1981: California Surf
- 1983: Seattle Sounders
- 1984–1988: San Jose Earthquakes (WSL)
- 1989: San Jose Oaks
- 1990: Salt Lake Sting
- 1991–1992: San Francisco Bay Blackhawks
- 1996–1997: San Jose Clash
- 2001–2002: Des Moines Menace
- 2003–2004: Syracuse Salty Dogs
- 2004–2007: Rochester Raging Rhinos
- 2010–2012: Des Moines Menace
- * Club domestic league appearances and goals

Laurence John Calloway (born 17 June 1945) is an English retired footballer who played as defender, spending thirteen years in the English leagues and five years in the North American Soccer League. Since retiring from playing professionally, Calloway has coached teams in several US leagues.

== Playing career ==
=== England ===
Calloway began his professional playing career with Wolverhampton Wanderers in 1962, but failed to make an appearance for their first team. He remained with Wolves until 1964 when he dropped down the league to join Rochdale where he would spend four seasons.

He spent the next thirteen years as a journeyman bouncing from one lower division club to another. In 1968 Calloway moved to Second Division Blackburn Rovers. After two seasons with Rovers he was sent to Division Four club Southport in August 1970 in exchange for Alex Russel. A year later Southport transferred Calloway to fellow Division Four club York City. He left York to his final English club Shrewsbury Town in 1972, where he remained for two seasons.

=== NASL ===
In 1974, Calloway left England to try his fortunes with the North American Soccer League. He signed with the San Jose Earthquakes. Over the next twenty-two years, he would return time and time again to the San Francisco Bay Area as both a player and a coach. From 1974 until 1977, Calloway became an integral part of the Earthquakes. His playing time peaked in 1977 when he saw time in 26 games and scored two goals. However, he received his greatest recognition in his first year with the team when he was selected as an NASL All Star Honorable Mention (third team). In 1978, he left the Earthquakes to coach and play for the Southern California Lazers of the American Soccer League (ASL), but was back in San Jose for the 1979 season. That year, he saw his lowest time on the field and he retired at the end of the season.

== Coaching career ==
With his retirement from playing, Calloway became a full-time coach, a job he would remain with for the next thirty years. As previously mentioned, he held his first head coaching position with the Southern California Lazers of the ASL during 1978, its only season in existence. When he retired from the Earthquakes in 1979, he then held various assistant coaching positions before being selected for his second head coaching position with the California Surf of the NASL. The team hired him in 1981 to replace Peter Wall. However, the Surf lasted only to the end of the 1981 season before folding.

Two years later, on 14 March 1983, the Seattle Sounders (NASL) hired Calloway as their new head coach. For the third time in his career, he was the head coach for a team in its last year in existence. Calloway took the team to a 12–18 record and third place in the Western Division. The Sounders folded at the end of the 1983 season, then the NASL collapsed at the end of the 1984 season. However, Peter Bridgwater, owner of the Earthquakes entered the Earthquakes in the Western Soccer Alliance, a loose collection of previously unaffiliated amateur and semi-pro "super clubs". Bridgwater hired Calloway who took the Earthquakes to a 4–1–2 record and the alliance title. That was the best the Earthquakes did until it folded after the 1988 season. That season the Earthquakes finished third in the alliance, its best finish since the 1985 season.

With the collapse of the Earthquakes, Calloway joined the San Jose Oaks as their head coach along with a number of former Earthquakes players, including Chris Dangerfield. In 1989, the WSA awarded a new Bay Area team, the San Francisco Bay Blackhawks. In 1991, the Blackhawks hired Calloway as the team's second head coach. He then took the Blackhawks to the 1991 APSL championship. That victory put the Blackhawks into the 1992 CONCACAF Champions' Cup. Under Calloway's direction, the Blackhawks went to the semifinals, only to lose to Club América on a 4–3 aggregate. Calloway coached the Blackhawks through the end of the 1992 season. The 1992 season was also characterised by antagonism between Calloway and a young forward by the name of Eric Wynalda. The feud between the two culminated when Wynalda launched into a tirade against Calloway after he was subbed out of a game. Calloway kicked Wynalda off the team and Wynalda left the US for Germany two weeks later.

The announcement of the formation of a new US division one league, Major League Soccer, Peter Bridgwater became instrumental in the formation of a new San Jose franchise. On 7 December 1995, he signed Calloway as the first head coach of the new team, the San Jose Clash. Ironically, given the problems Calloway had with Wynalda during their time together with the Blackhawks, the club signed Wynalda on 23 January 1996. The team continued to sign previous Blackhawks players, including Paul Bravo, John Doyle and Troy Dayak. While Calloway took these players to great success with the Blackhawks, he failed with the Clash. On 6 April 1996, the team began with a bang, it won the first game in league history on a goal by Wynalda, also the league's first. However, the team finished the season at 15–17 and the 1997 season went even worse. Eric Wynalda again became a source of friction with Calloway. At one point Wynalda hired an aeroplane to tow a banner demanding the team fire Calloway. Calloway also made numerous line-up changes which prevented the team from developing cohesive play. On 25 June 1997, midway through the season, Bridgwater had enough and fired Calloway. He left the team with a 21–29 record.

Calloway then moved to the US Fourth Division club Des Moines Menace. In 2002, Calloway was league Coach of the Year when he took the Menace to an undefeated regular season record.

On 18 November 2002, Calloway resigned from Des Moines to take job with expansion US second division club Syracuse Salty Dogs. The team lasted only two seasons (2003 and 2004) before folding in October 2004. Calloway took the team to a 26–20–10 record in its two seasons.

Two months later, on 14 December 2004, the Rochester Raging Rhinos, also a second division club, named Calloway as the club's new coach. On 23 October 2006, the Rhinos signed Calloway to three-year extension of his contract. In 2008, he officially resigned as head coach of the Rhinos.

During an 18 November 2009 press conference, the Des Moines Menace named Calloway the PDL Head Coach and Menace Academy's Director of Coaching.

This is Calloway's second stint with the USL Premier Development Club. Owner of the Menace Kyle Krause had the following to say about Calloway, "It's exciting to bring back Laurie. I have a tremendous amount of respect for him. It's a unique opportunity to bring back a coach who's coached and played at the highest level in the United States."

On 20 July 2012, the Des Moines Menace announced that they would not renew Calloway's contract. Team owner, Kyle Krause, said, "To keep up with the ever-growing changes within our Menace programs, we have decided to move the Menace in a different direction with the structure of our PDL coaching roles and Laurie Calloway's contract will not be renewed".
