= Chance Fry =

American soccer player-coach

Personal information
- Date of birth: June 29, 1964 (age 62)
- Place of birth: Bellevue, Washington, United States
- Height: 6 ft 1 in (1.85 m)
- Position: Forward

Senior career*
Years	Team	Apps	(Gls)
1983	Seattle Sounders	18	(4)
1983–1984	Tulsa Roughnecks (indoor)	27	(15)
1984	Tulsa Roughnecks	22	(8)
1984–1985	New York Cosmos (indoor)	21	(3)
1986	San Jose Earthquakes	14	(8)
1986	Milwaukee Wave (indoor)	21	(10)
1986–1987	Fort Wayne Flames (indoor)	18	(7)
1987–1990	Seattle Storm		
1991	San Francisco Bay Blackhawks	17	(5)
1994–1997	Seattle Sounders	?	(26)

International career
1984	United States	5	(0)

Managerial career
- 1990–1991: Seattle Redhawks (assistant)
- 1992–1994: Washington Huskies (assistant)
- 1997: Seattle Sounders (assistant)
- 1999–2001: Bellevue Bulldogs (women's)
- 2000–2002: Seattle Sounders Women
- 2002: Seattle Sounders (assistant)
- 2002–2004: Bellevue Bulldogs (men's)
- 2008: Canada women's U–20 (assistant)
- * Club domestic league appearances and goals

Chance Fry (born June 29, 1964, in Bellevue, Washington) is a retired U.S. soccer forward who began his career straight out of high school with the Seattle Sounders of the North American Soccer League. With the collapse of the NASL, he moved to indoor soccer as well as U.S. minor leagues. Since retiring from playing, Fry has become a college soccer coach. He also earned five caps with the U.S. national team in 1984 and was the 1990 American Professional Soccer League leading goal scorer.

== Youth ==
Chance Fry, a native of Bellevue, Washington, had a long career as a U.S. soccer player. Fry attended and played soccer at Sammamish High School in Bellevue where he was a Parade Magazine High School All American and All Conference his senior year.

== Professional ==
In 1982, the Seattle Sounders selected Fry out of high school with the first pick of the 1983 North American Soccer League draft. He played for the Sounders during their last year in existence, 1983, scoring four goals and assisting on three more. Because he was from the local area, he lived with his parents while playing for the Sounders. In October 1983, the Tulsa Roughnecks selected Fry in the dispersal draft. He played for the Roughnecks during the 1983–1984 NASL indoor season. He continued to mature as a player, seeing time in 22 games, scoring 8 goals and assisting on 4 more during the 1984 outdoor season. At the end of the season, the Roughnecks and the NASL folded. In October 1984, Fry moved to the Chicago Sting as the team prepared for the upcoming Major Indoor Soccer League season, but the Sting sold his contract to the New York Cosmos in November. As the Cosmos began to fail financially, they released Fry and several other players in March 1985. In the summer of 1986, he signed with the Milwaukee Wave of the American Indoor Soccer Association, but was traded to the expansion Fort Wayne Flames. In 1986, Fry was with the San Jose Earthquakes in the Western Soccer Alliance (WSA). While the Earthquakes finished sixth out of seven teams, Fry had an excellent year, scoring 8 goals (second in the league). In 1987, Fry moved to the Seattle Storm. This year he finally experienced some team success as the Storm finished second in the league, falling to the Earthquakes in the wild card game. In 1988, Fry remained with the Storm, helping it to the WSA championship, scoring an unassisted goal in Seattle's 5-0 destruction of the Earthquakes. Fry ended the season 8th on the points list with 3 goals and 3 assists. In 1989, Fry continued to produce for the Storm, finishing fifth in the league's points chart with 20 off 8 goals and 4 assists. In 1990, the Western Soccer League merged with the American Soccer League to form the American Professional Soccer League. Fry dominated the new league, scoring a league high 17 goals, assisting on 5 more and topping the APSL points list with 39. The team, however, did not do as well. It finished with a 10–10 record and folded at the end of the season. Fry remained in the APSL, but moved to the San Francisco Bay Blackhawks for the 1991 season. While Fry did not produce as many points for the Blackhawks as he did for the Storm, (6 goals, 2 assists and 14 points), the team still won the 1991 APSL championship. In 1994, Fry returned to the second version of the Seattle Sounders of the APSL. That year, he scored 11 goals in 18 games and was selected as a 1st Team All Star. He would play with the team through the 1997 season.

== Coaching ==
In 1999, Fry established the Bellevue Community College women's soccer team, which he coached for a single season. In 2002, he returned to the school as the men's soccer coach.

As of 2024, he was executive director of the Eastside Football Club in Preston, WA.
