= Dean Wurzberger =

American soccer player and coach

Personal information
- Date of birth: April 12, 1953 (age 73)
- Place of birth: Baltimore, Maryland, United States
- Position: Defender

Youth career
- 1971–1974: San Diego State University

Senior career*
Years	Team	Apps	(Gls)
1975–1977	Seattle Sounders	0	(0)
1977–1979	California Sunshine		

Managerial career
- 1982–1984: American River College
- 1985: Sacramento State
- 1986–1988: UCLA (assistant)
- 1989–1990: San Francisco Bay Blackhawks
- 1991: Santa Clara University (assistant)
- 1992–2010: University of Washington
- * Club domestic league appearances and goals

Dean Wurzberger is a U.S. soccer coach who was a reserve team player with the Seattle Sounders of the North American Soccer League. He later spent three seasons in the American Soccer League and most recently served as Head Coach for the University of Washington men's soccer team, a position he held since 1992.

== Player ==
Wurzberger attended San Diego State University where he played on the men's soccer team from 1971 to 1974. In 1975, he signed with the Seattle Sounders of the North American Soccer League (NASL). However, in his three years with the Sounders, he never cracked the first team. After seeing no success in Seattle, he moved to the California Sunshine, which was based out of Orange County, California, of the American Soccer League (ASL), in 1979.

== Coach ==
In 1982, Wurzberger became the head coach of the American River College men's team, a position he held until 1984. He completed his bachelor's degree requirements at Sacramento State in 1982. He then went on to earn a master's degree in 1985. Both degrees were in physical education. In 1985, he became the head coach of the school's soccer team and took the team to an 8–9–4 record. The next year, UCLA hired Wurzberger as an assistant coach on the Bruins soccer team.

In 1989, the San Francisco Bay Blackhawks of the Western Soccer League (WSL) hired Wurzberger as the team's first coach. Wurzberger took his first year team to an 11–5 record and a spot in the championship game where they lost to the San Diego Nomads. Between the 1989 and 1990 season, the WSL merged with the east-coast based American Soccer League (ASL) to form the American Professional Soccer League (APSL). Wurzberger continued to lead the Blackhawks to great success as the team ran to a 13–7 record and another spot in the title game. However, the team again came up short, this time losing to the Maryland Bays.

In 1991, Wurzberger left the Blackhawks to become an assistant coach under Steve Sampson at Santa Clara University. In his one season with Santa Clara, saw the Broncos lose to the University of Virginia in the NCAA championship game.

In 1992, Wurzberger moved to Seattle, Washington to become the first full-time head coach of the University of Washington men's soccer team. He resigned that position December 12, 2010.

In addition to coaching the UW Huskies, Wurzberger was an assistant coach for the U.S. soccer team at the 1993 World University Games. Then, in 1997, he was an assistant coach of the U.S. U-18 national and the head coach of the U.S. U-16 national team in 1998.
