= Peter Isaacs =

Jamaican footballer (born 1968)

Personal information
- Full name: Peter McGregor Isaacs
- Date of birth: 18 August 1968 (age 58)
- Place of birth: Kingston, Jamaica
- Height: 6 ft 0 in (1.83 m)
- Position: Forward

Youth career
- 1986–1989: Howard University

Senior career*
Years	Team	Apps	(Gls)
1990–1992	San Francisco Bay Blackhawks		
1993	San Jose Hawks		
1993–1994	Irapuato		
1994	Fort Lauderdale Strikers	?	(3)
1995	Tampa Bay Cyclones		
1998	Miami Breakers		

International career
1989–1994	Jamaica	11	(1)
- * Club domestic league appearances and goals

Peter Isaacs (born 18 August 1968) is a former Jamaican soccer forward.

== Youth ==
Isaacs grew up in Kingston and attended Wolmer's School, where he was spotted by scouts from Howard University who recruited him to play at the university. He attended Howard from 1986 to 1989, playing on the men's soccer team. In 1988, Howard went to the NCAA championship game only to fall to Indiana. In 1989, Isaacs capped his collegiate career by being named a first team All American and a finalist for the Hermann Trophy.

== Professional ==
On 26 July 1990, the Dallas Sidekicks drafted Isaacs in the first round (seventh overall) of the Major Indoor Soccer League draft. However, a month earlier, on 26 June 1990, the San Francisco Bay Blackhawks of the American Professional Soccer League (APSL) had signed Isaacs to a two-year contract. He remained with the team through the 1993 season, after which the team folded. He then moved to Mexican Second Division club Irapuato for the 1993–1994 season. In 1994, he was back in the U.S. playing with the Fort Lauderdale Strikers of APSL. However, the Strikers folded at the end of the season. In 1995, he played for the Tampa Bay Cyclones in the USISL. On 6 April 1995, Major League Soccer signed Isaacs and in January 1996, the Kansas City Wiz selected him in the second round (sixteenth overall) of the 1996 MLS Inaugural Player Draft. However, Isaacs never played for the Wiz. In 1998, he spent one season with the Miami Breakers.

== International ==
Isaacs earned at least 15 caps with Jamaica national team, scoring four goals.

He now coaches middle school soccer and in his spare time writes articles, one which was published by the Sun Sentinel in 2009.

== Career statistics ==
=== International ===
Appearances and goals by national team and year
National team	Year	Apps	Goals
Jamaica	1989	4	0
Jamaica	1990	–	
Jamaica	1991	–	
Jamaica	1992	6	1
Jamaica	1993	–	
Jamaica	1994	1	0
Total		11	1

Scores and results list Jamaica's goal tally first, score column indicates score after each Isaacs goal.

List of international goals scored by Peter Isaacs
No.	Date	Venue	Opponent	Score	Result	Competition
1	5 July 1992	Queen's Park Oval, Port of Spain, Trinidad and Tobago	Trinidad and Tobago	1–0	2–1	1994 FIFA World Cup qualification
