= Scott Wulferdingen =

American soccer player

Personal information
- Place of birth: United States
- Position: Forward

Youth career
- 1987–1989: Chico State

Senior career*
Years	Team	Apps	(Gls)
1989–1991	San Francisco Bay Blackhawks		
1993–1995	Chico Rooks		
- * Club domestic league appearances and goals

Scott Wulferdingen is a retired American soccer forward who played professionally in the American Professional Soccer League and USISL.

Wulferdingen attended California State University, Chico, where he played on the Wildcats soccer team from 1987 to 1989. He was a 1989 NCAA Division II First Team All American. In 1989, Wulferdingen played as an amateur with the San Francisco Bay Blackhawks in the Western Soccer League. In 1990, Wulferdingen turned professional with the Blackhawks who were now playing in the American Professional Soccer League. That year, the Blackhawks went to the championship. Wulferdingen finished his time with the Blackhawks in 1991. He played for the Chico Rooks from 1993 to 1995.

Wulferdingen was inducted into the Chico State Athletics Hall of Fame as part of the Class of 2017.
