= Derek Van Rheenen =

Nigerian retired footballer (born 1964)

Personal information
- Date of birth: 3 January 1964 (age 62)
- Place of birth: Ibadan, Nigeria
- Height: 6 ft 1 in (1.85 m)
- Position: Defender

College career
Years	Team	Apps	(Gls)
1983–1986	California Golden Bears		

Senior career*
Years	Team	Apps	(Gls)
1986–1990	San Francisco Greek-Americans		
1990–1992	San Francisco Bay Blackhawks		
1993	San Jose Hawks		
1994–1998	San Francisco Greek-Americans		
- * Club domestic league appearances and goals

Derek Van Rheenen (born 3 January 1964) is a Nigerian retired footballer who played as a defender. He played his entire career with three San Francisco-based clubs.

== Youth and college ==
Born in Nigeria, Van Rheenen grew up in California, where he attended Woodside High School in Woodside, California, part of the San Francisco Bay Area. In 1980, he scored one of his team's four goals in Woodside's Central Coast Section championship. After graduating from high school, Van Rheenen attended University of California, Berkeley where he played on the men's soccer team from 1983 to 1986. He was the captain and co-MVP of the league his senior year. He also received Academic All American Honors before graduating with a Bachelor's degree in political economy and German.

In 2008, Van Rheenen was inducted into the Cal Athletics Hall of Fame.

== Playing career ==
=== San Francisco Greek-Americans ===
In 1986, Van Rheenen joined the powerhouse amateur club, San Francisco Greek-Americans. In 1988, the team went to the National Challenge Cup final, only to lose to the St. Louis Busch Seniors.

=== San Francisco Bay Blackhawks ===
In 1990, Van Rheenen he signed with the San Francisco Bay Blackhawks of the American Professional Soccer League (APSL). That season the Blackhawks went to the title match, only to fall to the Maryland Bays in penalty kicks. The next year the Blackhawks took the league title, defeating the Albany Capitals. Van Rheenen earned individual honors as a first team All Star. In 1993, the team saw a drop off in its league performance as it concentrated on making a run through the CONCACAF Champions Cup in which it went to the semifinals only to fall to the Hugo Sánchez-led Club América, 4–3 on aggregate. At the end of the 1992 season, the Blackhawks owner pulled the team from the APSL and relocated it to the lower division U.S. Interregional Soccer League (USISL). He also renamed the team the San Jose Hawks. Even under the new name, the Hawks continued to dominate, taking first place in the Pacific Division and winning a spot in the Sizzling Six championship. Despite winning both of its games, the team found itself shut out of the title game based on goal differential. However, Van Rheenen was named a first team All Star again. Despite its success, the Hawks folded at the end of the season. Van Rheenen was team captain during his four seasons with the Blackhawks/Hawks.

=== San Francisco Greek-Americans ===
Following the demise of the Hawks, Van Rheenen rejoined the Greek-Americans and spent five years with the club. In 1994, the Greek-Americans went to the U.S. Open Cup final, this time taking the title with a win over Milwaukee Bavarian Leinenkugel. The Greek-Americans were the last amateur club to win the Open Cup. While the professional teams have dominated the Open Cup since 1995, Van Rheenen and the Greek-Americans continued to experience national success, winning the 1996 and 1998 Over-30 national championship and the 2004 Over 40 national championship.

=== Other clubs ===
In 2000, Van Rheenen was a member, and the leading scorer, for the Olympic Club in the San Francisco Soccer Football League's Major Division. Fellow Berkeley graduate, and Blackhawks teammate, Peter Woodring, also played on the team.

Van Rheenen continues to play for the Over-40 club Real Marin Spurs of the Marin Soccer League, finishing in third place in the Summer 2018 season.

== University career ==
After leaving professional soccer, Van Rheenen returned to Berkeley, where he attained a Master's degree in education in 1993 and a Doctorate in Cultural Studies in 1997. He is currently a professor at Berkeley, managing the Cultural Studies of Sports in Education master's degree program in the Graduate School of Education and is the Director of the Athletic Study Center, overseeing all tutorial and advising services for student athletes.
