= Mark Semioli =

American soccer player

Personal information
- Date of birth: March 20, 1968 (age 58)
- Place of birth: Brooklyn, New York, United States
- Height: 6 ft 0 in (1.83 m)
- Position: Defender

Youth career
- 1986–1989: Stanford

Senior career*
Years	Team	Apps	(Gls)
1989–1992	San Francisco Bay Blackhawks		
1993	San Jose Hawks		
1993	Palo Alto Firebirds		
1994	→ Silicon Valley Firebirds		
1994	San Francisco Greek-Americans		
1995	Monterey Bay Jaguars		
1996–1997	Los Angeles Galaxy	40	(0)
1997–2001	MetroStars	81	(4)

Managerial career
- 1995: Monterey Bay Jaguars
- New York Athletic Club
- * Club domestic league appearances and goals

Mark Semioli (born March 20, 1968, in Brooklyn, New York) is a retired American soccer defender who played six seasons in Major Soccer League, four in American Professional Soccer League and three in USISL. He won the 1994 U.S. Open Cup with the San Francisco Greek Americans.

== College ==
Semioli attended Stanford University, playing on the men's soccer team from 1986 to 1989. He was a 1987 Third Team All American.

== Professional ==
In 1989, Semioli played as an amateur with the professional San Francisco Bay Blackhawks of the Western Soccer League during the collegiate off season. Following the completion of his collegiate eligibility in the fall of 1989, Semioli signed a professional contract with the Blackhawks. In 1990, the WSL merged with the American Soccer League to form the American Professional Soccer League (APSL). The Blackhawks won the 1991 APSL championship. Despite its success, the team lost money and in 1993 moved to the lower division USISL. Semioli moved to the Palo Alto Firebirds of USISL that year. The Firebirds were sold and moved to San Jose, California, becoming the Silicon Valley Firebirds for the 1994 USISL season. Semioli was the team captain and a first team All Star. He also spent part of the season with the San Francisco Greek-Americans, winning the U.S. Open Cup with them.

In 1995, Semioli left the Firebirds and moved to the Monterey Bay Jaguars. In addition to playing for the Jaguars, Semioli also coached the Jaguars for part of the season. He was named the USISL Western Division Defender of the Year as the Jaguars won the Western Division Conference. In February 1996, the Los Angeles Galaxy picked Semioli in the fifth round (44th overall) in the Inaugural MLS Draft. He played twenty-eight games that season, then began the 1997 season in Los Angeles before being traded to the MetroStars on June 17, 1997, in exchange for a second-round pick in the 1998 MLS Supplemental Draft. The Galaxy made this move to make room to sign Paul Caligiuri. Semioli remained with the MetroStars until November 17, 2001, when the team waived him. He subsequently retired from playing professionally. Semioli continues to play, and coach, in the Cosmopolitan Soccer League with the New York Athletic Club.

Since his retirement, Semioli has been working as a middle school World Cultures/Religions and History teacher for 6th and 7th graders at Kent Place School in New Jersey and for high school students in Scarsdale, NY. He is the department chair of history in Kent Place School. He is also one of the lead teachers for the social committee at Kent Place.He was inducted into the Suffolk Sports Hall of Fame on Long Island in the Soccer Category with the Class of 2017.
