= Mark Dougherty =

American soccer player (born 1967)

Personal information
- Date of birth: November 7, 1967 (age 58)
- Place of birth: Santa Clara, California, U.S.
- Height: 6 ft 2 in (1.88 m)
- Position: Goalkeeper

Youth career
- 1986–1989: Fresno State

Senior career*
| Years | Team | Apps | (Gls) |
| 1989–1992 | San Francisco Bay | | |
| 1993 | San Jose Hawks | | |
| 1994 | North Bay Breakers | | |
| 1995 | Hawaii Tsunami | | |
| 1996–1997 | Tampa Bay Mutiny | 54 | |
| 1998–2001 | Columbus Crew | 69 | |

Managerial career
- 1991: Fresno State women
- 1992: Mission College men
- 1993–1994: Sonoma State men (assistant)
- 1993–1994: Sonoma State women (assistant)
- 1994: North Bay Breakers (player-coach)
- 1995: Hawaii Tsunami (player-coach)
- 1995: Santa Rosa JC women
- 2002–2003: Bowling Green State men (assistant)
- 2003–2004: Colorado Rapids (assistant)
- 2003–2005: Colorado Rush (academy director)
- 2006: United States women (assistant)
- * Club domestic league appearances and goals

Mark Dougherty (born November 7, 1967) is an American retired soccer goalkeeper who played in the Western Soccer League, American Professional Soccer League, USISL and Major League Soccer. He served as a goalkeeper coach with the U.S. women national team.

== High School and College ==
Dougherty grew up in San Jose, California and Cupertino, California. He began playing youth soccer in the Police Athletic League. After playing recreational-level soccer, he was recruited to play for his local club by coach Ken Campbell, South Valley United, where he remained from age 9–19, traveling around the nation and Canada for tournaments. Dougherty was competing year-round by the time he reached high school. He attended Santa Teresa High School and Monta Vista High School where he joined the boys' soccer team. Dougherty made the varsity team as a freshman, and helped his team to a conference title.

After starting four years in high school and repeatedly reaching the state playoffs, he was offered a scholarship to Fresno State University by then-assistant coach John Bluem. He red-shirted his freshman year, then started four consecutive years. His first year playing on the men's soccer team, in 1986, he led the Bulldogs to win the Pacific Coast Athletic Association championship and to the NCAA Final Four. That year, they set a record for the most wins for Fresno State with 18 and Dougherty set the record for fewest goals allowed (10). Dougherty was team captain his junior and senior seasons, in 1988 and 1989, and led the team to win back to back Big West Conference Championships. He was also named Player of the Week for October 11, 1988. In 1989, the team set records for fewest losses, (3) most penalty kicks made, (7) and longest unbeaten streak, with 17 wins and a 14-0-3 record.

During his college career, he was a four-year letterman, named a four time all-Far West selection, selected to the Second Team, All-Big West in 1987, and First Team 1988 and 1989. He ended his college career, in 1989, with 0.76 goals against average. Dougherty still holds the Big West Conference record for career shutouts, with thirty-eight between 1986 and 1989. Dougherty continued to attend classes, after being signed to play professionally, finally graduating in 1991 with a Bachelor of Science in finance from Fresno State.

== Professional career ==
=== Early career ===
After exhausting his NCAA eligibility in 1989, Dougherty signed with the expansion San Francisco Bay Blackhawks, which were in the Western Soccer League (WSL). Between 1989 and 1991, the Blackhawks played in three championships in a row. The team came in second in the WSL championship game in 1989. Then, in 1990, the WSL merged with the American Soccer League to form the American Professional Soccer League (APSL). The Blackhawks again went to the championship game, but came up short a second time. In 1991, Dougherty led the league with a .81 goals against average per game as the Blackhawks won the title. Dougherty made two saves during the shootout and was named the championship MVP and a first team All Star. He was ranked 1st among APSL goalkeepers with 7 shut outs and 0.58 goals against average, and was 3–1 in penalty kicks. Even so, he finished second in voting for league MVP. The last of those championships, the 1991 APSL title, qualified the Blackhawks for a place in the 1992 CONCACAF Champions' Cup. As the Blackhawks were the United States' top professional club, in 1992 they traveled to Mexico City to face Club América in a home-and-away series at the most fearsome venue in North American soccer: Estadio Azteca. With questionable refereeing that caused the Blackhawks to believe that there was a conspiracy to keep them out of the final, they were narrowly defeated. In 1993, the team owner moved the Blackhawks from the APSL to the USISL and renamed the team the San Jose Hawks. The Hawks took their division with a 14–2 record, making the Sizzlin’ Six tournament before folding at the end of the season.

In 1994, Dougherty joined the North Bay Breakers as a player-coach.

In 1995, Dougherty was with the Hawaii Tsunami (USISL) as both a player and assistant coach. The Tsunami went 18–2, leading the USISL in both goals scored and goals against. Hawaii was also a perfect 10–0 at home. The Tsunami also won the Northwest Division championship and a berth in the Sizzlin' Nine championships.

=== Major League Soccer ===
In February 1996, Dougherty expected to be selected in the first round of the 1996 MLS Inaugural Player Draft by coach Laurie Calloway of the San Jose Clash, eighth overall. Calloway had coached Dougherty previously, when he played for the San Francisco Bay Blackhawks. Instead, the Tampa Bay Mutiny selected Dougherty seventh overall. Dougherty was the first goalkeeper to be drafted. He went 17–11 with a 1.68 goals against average, the fourth best in the league, and had three shutouts. He was named to the 1996 all-star team and he led the Mutiny to the league's best record (20–12). In the playoffs, he went 2–1 against the Columbus Crew, before losing the first game to D.C. United in the conference finals. He did not play in the second game, and the Mutiny were defeated by D.C.

The next year, in 1997, Dougherty went 15–9 with a 1.89 goals against average and three shutouts. He racked up enough victories (17) to place Tampa second in the east, only to be knocked out in the first round of the playoffs by the Crew. After two very successful seasons with the Mutiny in 1996 and 1997, in which Dougherty posted two six-game winning streaks and compiled the most victories in MLS' brief history, he was placed on waivers when the Mutiny acquired Swedish World Cup hero Thomas Ravelli.

Dougherty was acquired by the Columbus Crew following the 1997 season in the waiver draft. Soon after, the Crew were allocated national team goalkeeper Juergen Sommer. Despite Sommer claiming the starter's role, Dougherty played when he was at the World Cup. Noted as "one of the most astounding goalkeeping displays in the history of the Crew," Dougherty made several stunning first-half saves in a home game against San Jose. In 1999, Sommer suffered a severe knee injury. As a result, for the inaugural season at Columbus Crew stadium, Dougherty was starting goalkeeper. That year, Dougherty became the first goalkeeper in league history to record 50 wins, with a 4–2 win over the MetroStars on August 18, 1999, at Giants Stadium. He led the Crew in minutes played, playing 90 minutes in all but one of 31 appearances, and still had the lowest goals against average in the Eastern Conference, along with a career high of 18 wins. The team set a record for fewest goals allowed in a season with just 39 goals allowed, and five shutouts. He was recognized for his play during the 1999 season as the Crew's Most Valuable Player, and BIC Defender of the Year, and also received the Huntington Bank "Man of the Year" award from the team for his community service.

Dougherty entered the 2000 season as MLS' all-time wins leader with 54 career victories, and third among all MLS keepers in career saves with 495. He led the Crew to second place in the Eastern Conference, with a 0.67 goals against average. He finished the regular season fifth in the league. He was second in wins (18), second in minutes (2745), fourth in saves (106), fourth in the infamous catches/punches (104), fifth in shutouts (6) and sixth in saves-to-goals ratio (3.03). In 2000, he started 25 matches, posting a 10-12-3 record with three shutouts against New York/ New Jersey, Kansas City, and Miami. His season high was 11 saves in a 4–2 win against Miami on May 27, 2000, including 7 saves in the second half.

By 2001, Dougherty had 121 career appearances, 119 starts, and was still leading the league with 64 career victories. He was second in the league with 500 career saves, and had 16 career shutouts. He played only two games in 2001 after suffering a knee injury. He retired from playing at the end of the season.

== Coaching ==
In 1991, Dougherty coached the Fresno State University's Women's Soccer Team. In 1992, he coached the Mission College's Men's Soccer Team. From 1993 to 1994, he was an assistant coach for Sonoma State University's Men's Soccer Team and the goalkeeper coach for both the men's and women's teams. In 1994, he was a player-coach for the North Bay Breakers. In 1995, was a player-coach for the Hawaii Tsunami, and he also coached the Santa Rosa Junior College Women's Soccer Team to the state championship where they lost to Mt. San Antonio.

Dougherty took a hiatus from coaching while he played professionally until 2002, when Bowling Green State University hired Dougherty as an assistant soccer coach. He then moved to the Colorado Rapids where he was an assistant coach and goalkeeper coach until 2005. He was also the director of the Colorado Rush's youth academy during that time, and coached the girls' U-12 team and U-18 teams to Colorado State Cup championships in 2004 and 2005, respectively. The Colorado Rush club won state championships in the 2002, 2003, and 2004 seasons. Dougherty then became the goalkeeper coach with the U.S. women's national team.

After taking a few years off from coaching, Dougherty coached his son and 9 other boys during the fall 2008 soccer season. The Colorado Rush "Crush" U-10 recorded 9 wins and lost only once, eventually winning the Gold A1 bracket.

Dougherty is the director of the soccer program at the Coral Gables War Memorial Youth Center in Coral Gables, Florida.

== Honors ==
- F.I.U. Homecoming Soccer Classic Outstanding Defensive Player: 1987
- Fresno State University Chris Johnson Memorial Award for Most Inspirational Player: 1988
- Adidas-Ethel M Soccer Classic MVP: 1989
- Fresno State University Captains Award: 1989
- Fresno State University Coaches Award: 1989
- Soccer Magic Player of the Year: 1991
- APSL All Star First Team: 1991
- MVP of APSL Championship Series: 1991
- MLS All-Star Eastern Conference: 1996
- Columbus Crew Most Valuable Player: 1999
- Huntington Bank "Man of the Year": 1999
- BIC Defender of the Year: 1999
