= Steve Corpening =

American soccer player

Personal information
- Full name: Steven Corpening
- Date of birth: August 11, 1965 (age 61)
- Place of birth: Rantoul, Illinois, United States
- Positions: Forward; midfielder

Youth career
- 1984–1985: American River College
- 1987: Cal State-Sacramento

Senior career*
Years	Team	Apps	(Gls)
1989–1991	San Francisco Bay Blackhawks	?	(21)
1992–1996	San Jose Oaks		
1993–1995	Sacramento Knights (indoor)		
- * Club domestic league appearances and goals

Steve Corpening (born August 11, 1965, in Rantoul, Illinois) is a former U.S. soccer player who was the 1989 Western Soccer League leading scorer. He three seasons in the American Professional Soccer League and three in the Continental Indoor Soccer League.

== Youth ==
Born in Illinois, Corpening grew up in England where his father, a member of the United States Air Force was stationed. Corpening's family moved to Dixon, California where he graduated from Dixon High School. In 1984, he entered American River College where he was a 1984 All Northern California soccer player. In 1986, he transferred to California State University, Sacramento. However, he was ineligible to play the 1986 season. He spent the 1987 season with Cal State, scoring nine goals and assistant on four others en route to earning second team Division II All American honors. He was inducted into the Sac State Honor Roll in 2002.

== Professional ==
In 1989, Corpening signed with the expansion San Francisco Bay Blackhawks of the Western Soccer League (WSL). That season, he led the WSL in goals with eleven, earning second team All Star honors. In 1990, the WSL merged with the American Soccer League to form the American Professional Soccer League. That year, Corpening moved to the midfield which brought a reduction in goals to nine. In 1991, because of injury, he played only five games, scoring no goals. In 1992, he joined the San Jose Oaks in the semi-professional California Super League. He continued to play for the Oaks through at least 1996. In April 1993, the Sacramento Knights of the Continental Indoor Soccer League (CISL) drafted Corpening. He played for the Knights through the 1995 season.
