= Tim Martin (soccer) =

American soccer player (born 1967)

Personal information
- Date of birth: April 12, 1967 (age 59)
- Place of birth: San Jose, California, U.S.
- Height: 5 ft 11 in (1.80 m)
- Position: Defender

College career
Years	Team	Apps	(Gls)
1986	California Golden Bears		
1987–1989	Fresno State Bulldogs		

Senior career*
Years	Team	Apps	(Gls)
1987	San Jose Earthquakes		
1989–1992	San Francisco Bay Blackhawks		
1992–1993	Milwaukee Wave (indoor)	7	(1)
1993	San Jose Hawks		
1994	San Francsico Greek-Americans		
1994	Fort Lauderdale Strikers		
1995	Atlanta Ruckus		
1996–1998	San Jose Clash	83	(1)
1999	Colorado Rapids	19	(0)
1999	→ MLS Pro 40 (loan)	4	(0)
2000	Bay Area Seals	22	(0)

International career
1993–1996	United States	2	(0)

Managerial career
- 2001–2003: Cañada Colts
- 2004–2007: Santa Clara Broncos (assistant)
- * Club domestic league appearances and goals

Tim Martin (born April 12, 1967) is an American former soccer defender. Over his twelve-year professional career, he played with numerous teams in six leagues, winning the 1994 U.S. Open Cup with the San Francisco Greek-Americans and the 1991 American Professional Soccer League title with the San Francisco Bay Blackhawks. He also earned two caps with the U.S. national team. Since retiring from playing in 2000, he has become a college and youth soccer coach.

== Playing career ==
=== Youth ===
Martin began his college career at UC Berkeley in 1986. However, he transferred to Fresno State where he would go on to play three season (1987–1989) for the Bulldogs. During those three seasons, Martin captained the team and earned honors as the 1989 Big West player of the year, made Big West and Far West Regional First Teams. In 1989, he was also selected as an NCAA First Team All-American. He finished his career at Fresno State with 25 assists.

=== Club ===
In 1987, Martin spent the collegiate off season with the San Jose Earthquakes. He was First Team All League that season. In 1989, Martin signed with the San Francisco Bay Blackhawks of the Western Soccer Alliance (WSA) as a midfielder. In 1990, the WSA merged with the American Soccer League to form the American Professional Soccer League (APSL). Martin continued to play with the Blackhawks through the 1992 season when he saw time in only one game for as the team ran to an 8–8 record. At the end of the season, the team's owner moved the Blackhawks to the lower division USISL and renamed the team the San Jose Hawks. Martin spent the 1993 USISL season with the Hawks, but the team folded at the end of the season. He then moved to the semi-pro San Francisco Greek-Americans. Martin and the Greek-Americans won the 1994 U.S. Open Cup. In the fall of 1994, Martin played with the Fort Lauderdale Strikers of the APSL. In 1995, Martin joined the Atlanta Ruckus of the A-League where he was voted to the USISL All-Star team.

In February 1996, the San Jose Clash selected Martin in the third round (twenty-eight overall) in the league's Inaugural Player Draft. He spent three seasons with the Clash before being released at the end of the 1998 season. In 1996, the Clash named Martin the team's Defender of the Year. In February 1999, the Colorado Rapids selected Martin in the third round (thirty-second overall) of the 1999 MLS Supplemental Draft. He spent the 1999 season in Colorado as the Rapids went to the MLS quarterfinals as well as the U.S. Open Cup championship game. Martin retired from the Rapids on February 22, 2000.

Following his retirement from MLS, Martin signed with the A-League Bay Area Seals for the 2000 season. He was named the USL Defender of the Year for 2000, then retired permanently.

=== International ===
Martin earned two caps with the U.S. National Team. His first game with the national team came on November 14, 1993, in an 8–1 win over the Cayman Islands. Martin was a halftime substitute for Jeff Agoos. His second cap came three years later in the infamous October 16, 1996 defeat to Peru. For that game, the United States Soccer Federation was forced to field a team of fringe players after the national team went on strike just prior to the game.

== Coaching career ==
Since retiring from playing professionally, Martin lives in the Bay Area where he co-founded USA Seventeen Academy, a youth soccer academy. In 2001, Cañada College hired Martin as the school's soccer coach. Martin was later hired by Santa Clara Sporting as coaching director and released for actions not disclosed by Sporting. In 2004, he moved to Santa Clara University where he is an assistant coach to the men's soccer team.
