= Qin Guorong =

Chinese footballer

Personal information
- Full name: 秦国荣
- Date of birth: 4 May 1961 (age 65)
- Place of birth: Shanghai, China
- Height: 1.90 m (6 ft 3 in)
- Positions: Midfielder; forward

Senior career*
| Years | Team | Apps | (Gls) |
| 1979–1987 | Shanghai team | | |
| 1989–1992 | San Francisco Bay Blackhawks | | |

International career
| 1983–1986 | China | 16 | (3) |
Medal record
Men's football
Representing China
AFC Asian Cup
| Silver medal – second place | 1984 Singapore | Team |
- * Club domestic league appearances and goals

Qin Guorong (Chinese: 秦国荣; born 4 May 1961), commonly known as Townsend Qin, is a Chinese former footballer who played as a midfielder for Shanghai team and San Francisco Bay Blackhawks, while internationally he represented China in the 1984 Asian Cup.

== Playing career ==
Qin started his football career when he played for the Shanghai youth team before he graduated to the senior Shanghai team in the 1979 season. Zeng Xuelin would include him in the Chinese national team squad that competed in the 1984 Asian Cup where China came runners-up. He was subsequently dropped from the Chinese team by Gao Fengwen and Qin moved to the United States in 1987. In 1989, Qin signed with the San Francisco Bay Blackhawks of the Western Soccer League. In 1990, the WSL merged with the American Soccer League to form the American Professional Soccer League. Qin continued to play for the Blackhawks in the new league. He was a 1990 and 1991 First Team All Star and continued to play for the Blackhawks through the 1992 season.

== Career statistics ==
=== International ===
| Year | Competition | Apps | Goal |
|---|---|---|---|
| 1983–1986 | Friendly | 11 | 2 |
| 1984 | Great Wall Cup | 2 | 0 |
| 1985 | FIFA World Cup qualification | 1 | 0 |
| 1986 | Asian Games | 2 | 1 |
| Total | | 16 | 3 |
