= John Doyle (soccer, born 1966) =

American soccer player (born 1966)

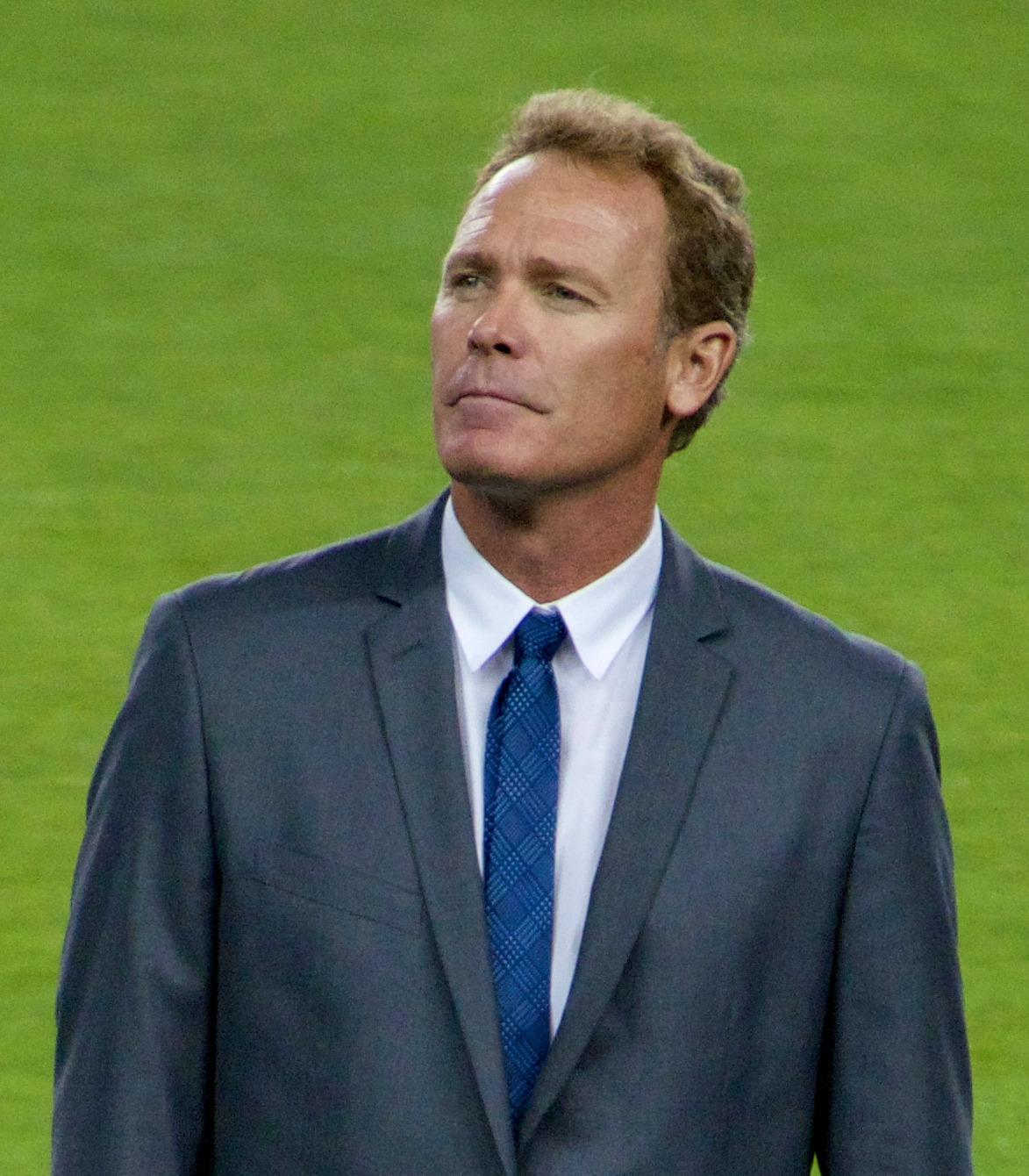

Personal information
- Full name: John Joseph Doyle
- Date of birth: March 16, 1966 (age 60)
- Place of birth: San Jose, California, United States
- Height: 6 ft 3 in (1.91 m)
- Position: Defender

Youth career
- 1985–1988: San Francisco Dons

Senior career*
Years	Team	Apps	(Gls)
1987	San Jose Earthquakes		
1989–1990	San Francisco Bay Blackhawks		
1990–1993	Örgryte IS		
1992	→ San Francisco Bay Blackhawks (loan)	6	(0)
1993–1994	VfB Leipzig	7	(0)
1995	→ Atlanta Ruckus (loan)	25	(1)
1996–2000	San Jose Earthquakes	135	(11)

International career
1987–1994	United States	53	(3)

Managerial career
- 2004–2005: San Jose Earthquakes (assistant)
Medal record
Representing United States
Winner	CONCACAF Gold Cup	1991
Runner-up	CONCACAF Gold Cup	1993
Men's Soccer
- * Club domestic league appearances and goals

John Joseph Doyle (born March 16, 1966) is an American former professional soccer player who played professionally in both Europe and the United States including the Western Soccer League, American Professional Soccer League and Major League Soccer. He was the 1995 A-League Defender of the Year and the 1996 MLS Defender of the Year. He also earned fifty-three caps with the U.S. national team between 1987 and 1994 including two games at the 1990 FIFA World Cup. He was a member of the U.S. team at the 1988 Summer Olympics and was most recently the general manager of the San Jose Earthquakes of Major League Soccer before resigning on August 29, 2016.

== Youth ==
Doyle attended Washington High School in Fremont, California where he played on the boys' soccer team. The team won the league championship Doyle's senior year. At the end of his senior year, he held the school's scoring record and had been named All-League each year he played. Doyle was named Athlete of the Decade for the 1980s. Doyle also played soccer with the Fremont City youth soccer club where he was a four-time state champion. After high school, he attended the University of San Francisco where he played college soccer. He was a 1986 second team All-American.

== Professional ==
=== Western Soccer League ===
In 1987, Doyle spent the collegiate off-season with the San Jose Earthquakes of the Western Soccer League. In 1989 and 1990, he also played for the San Francisco Bay Blackhawks during the college soccer off-season. In 1989, he was named to the WSL All-Star team.

=== Europe ===
In 1990, he moved to Europe where he signed with Swedish club Örgryte IS. In 1992, he returned to the Blackhawks for six games during the summer. In 1993, he played for German First Division club VfB Leipzig. Leipzig had won promotion to the First Division in 1993, but lasted only one year there, finishing last in 1994 and being demoted to the Second Division for the next season.

=== Return to the U.S. ===
With the demotion of Leipzig, Doyle signed with Major League Soccer (MLS). However, when the league delayed its first season to 1996, Doyle joined the Atlanta Ruckus of the A-League on loan from MLS for their inaugural season. The Ruckus developed their team around Doyle and the defense, which led the team to the league's championship game where the Ruckus lost to the Seattle Sounders. Doyle was selected to the league All-Star team and was named the league Defender of the Year.

In order to ensure an initial equitable distribution of talent to each of the league's new teams, MLS allocated well-known players. Doyle was allocated to the San Jose Clash. Doyle became the first player, and first-team captain, in the Clash's history in 1996. He was then named MLS's first Defender of the Year. Doyle scored eleven goals and had fifteen assists in his time in the league.

== National and Olympic teams ==
The U.S. Olympic team called in Doyle for a May 30, 1987, qualification match against Canada. The U.S. had lost 2–0 to Canada a week earlier and needed to win by that margin or greater to continue qualification. The team rose to the challenge and defeated Canada 3–0. Doyle continued to play with the Olympic team, including its three games at the 1988 Summer Olympics in Seoul, South Korea. In those games, he scored a goal in the 4–2 loss to the Soviet Union. He would continue to play for the national team in 1989, when the U.S. began qualification for the 1990 FIFA World Cup. He played two games for the U.S. at the finals.

== Post-playing career ==
After his retirement from the Earthquakes, Doyle worked as a TV and radio color commentator for the team. In 2004, he was hired as assistant coach, replacing Dominic Kinnear who was promoted to head coach after Frank Yallop's departure to coach the Canada national team. He stayed on until the franchise was relocated to Houston for the 2006 season. On October 3, 2007, he was named the new general manager of the Earthquakes. Doyle was fired by the Earthquakes on August 29, 2016.

Doyle is also the Director of Coaching of Mustang Soccer League, in Danville, California.

== Honors ==
Western Soccer Alliance

- First Team All Star: 1989

A-League

- Defender of the Year: 1995
- First Team All Star: 1990, 1992, 1995

Major League Soccer

- MLS All-Star: 1996, 1997
- Defender of the Year: 1996
- MLS Best XI: 1996

== Recognitions ==
- 1999 – University of San Francisco Hall of Fame
- 2005 – Legend of the Hilltop
- 2019 – San Jose Sports Hall of Fame

Sporting positions
Preceded by N/A	San Jose Clash/Earthquakes captain 1996–2000	Succeeded by Jeff Agoos
