= Paul Bravo =

American soccer player

Personal information
- Date of birth: June 19, 1968 (age 58)
- Place of birth: Campbell, California, U.S.
- Height: 6 ft 0 in (1.83 m)
- Positions: Midfielder; forward

College career
Years	Team	Apps	(Gls)
1988–1989	Santa Clara Broncos		

Senior career*
Years	Team	Apps	(Gls)
1991–1992	San Francisco Bay Blackhawks	25	(3)
1993	San Jose Hawks		
1994	Greek-American A.C.		
1995	Monterey Bay Jaguars	19	(19)
1996	San Jose Clash	31	(13)
1997–2001	Colorado Rapids	135	(39)
2001–?	Hollywood United		

International career
1994–1999	United States	4	(1)

Managerial career
- 2002–2003: Colorado Rapids (assistant)
- 2004–2005: UCLA (assistant)
- 2006–2008: Los Angeles Galaxy (assistant)
- 2009–2016: Colorado Rapids (technical director)
- 2019: Oakland Roots
- * Club domestic league appearances and goals

Paul Bravo (born June 19, 1968) is an American former soccer player who was most recently head coach of NISA side Oakland Roots SC. He played six seasons in Major League Soccer, two in the American Professional Soccer League and two in the USISL. He also earned four caps, scoring one goal, with the United States men's national soccer team. After he retired from playing, Bravo served for several years as an assistant coach in both Major League Soccer and the NCAA and was most recently Technical Director for the Colorado Rapids.

== Early life and education ==
Bravo was a student-athlete at Santa Teresa High School in San Jose, California. He then played two years of college soccer at Foothill Community College and winning State Championships and while at Santa Clara University and helped his team to the NCAA co-championship in 1989. While he left college early, he continued to work on his education and earned a bachelor's degree in political science from Santa Clara in 1993.

== Playing career ==
=== Professional ===
In 1991, Bravo signed with the San Francisco Bay Blackhawks of the American Professional Soccer League (APSL). He earned Rookie of the Year honors that season as the Blackhawks took the APSL championship. In 1993, the Blackhawks ownership moved the team to the lower division USISL and renamed the team the San Jose Hawks. Despite the reduced team costs, the Hawks folded at the end of the 1993 season. Bravo then remained in the San Francisco area with the San Francisco Greek-Americans, winning the U.S. Open Cup in 1994. In 1995, he moved to the Monterey Bay Jaguars.

The San Jose Clash of Major League Soccer (MLS) drafted Bravo with the eighth overall pick of the MLS Inaugural Player Draft. Bravo spent just a season with San Jose, and, despite the presence of Eric Wynalda, led the team with thirteen goals. He was an MLS All-Star this year. On December 15, 1996, the Clash traded Bravo and Rafael Amaya to the Colorado Rapids for Dominic Kinnear and a second-round pick in the 1998 MLS Supplemental Draft. Bravo spent the next five years with Colorado and retired with a club-record 39 league goals (he added five in the playoffs). In November 2001 the Rapids waived Bravo, but as no team offered him a contract, he retired from playing professionally. In his six-year MLS career, Bravo scored 52 goals and added 27 assists. He repeated as an All-Star in 1998 and 1999.

=== Semi-professional ===
After his retirement, Bravo continued to play for the amateur Hollywood United F.C. in Los Angeles.

=== National team ===
Bravo earned four caps for the United States national team. His first cap came in a December 11, 1994 tie with Honduras. He did not play again until April 22, 1995, a 1–0 loss to Belgium. In 1999, Bruce Arena called up Bravo for the 1999 Confederations Cup. He started the July 30, 1999 game against Germany, then earned his last cap in the third-place 2–0 victory against Saudi Arabia. The U.S. won that game on the strength of goals from both Bravo and Brian McBride.

== Coaching career ==
After retiring as a player, Bravo went into coaching. He began as an assistant with the Colorado Rapids in 2002. In 2004, UCLA hired Bravo as an assistant to its men's soccer team. On June 15, 2006, he became an assistant coach with the Los Angeles Galaxy of MLS. On August 24, 2007, he became the Galaxy's Director of Soccer.

On January 10, 2009, he was named the Technical Director for the Colorado Rapids. He signed a three-year contract extension with Colorado on February 1, 2012.

In May 2019, Bravo was announced as the first head coach of Oakland Roots SC of the new National Independent Soccer Association. On October 31, 2019, the club announced that it and Bravo had mutually agreed to part ways.

== Awards and honors ==
Individual

- MLS All-Star: 1996, 1998, 1999
