= Troy Dayak =

American soccer player (born 1971)

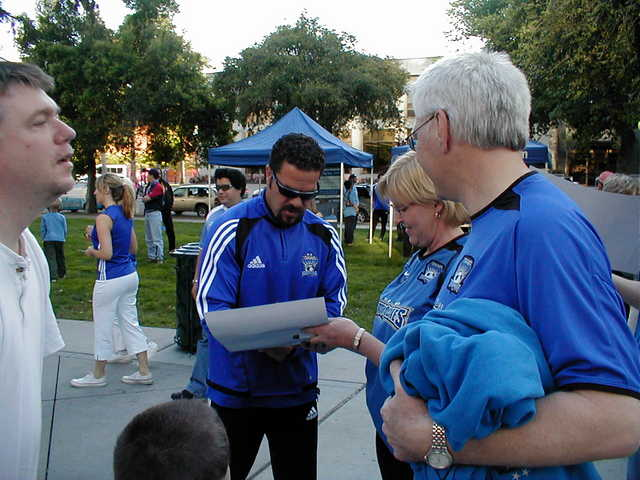

Personal information
- Full name: Troy Dayak
- Date of birth: January 29, 1971 (age 55)
- Place of birth: Walnut Creek, California, United States
- Height: 5 ft 11 in (1.80 m)
- Position: Defender

Senior career*
Years	Team	Apps	(Gls)
1989–1992	San Francisco Bay Blackhawks		
1993	San Jose Hawks		
1993–1994	Cleveland Crunch (indoor)	26	(1)
1995	San Jose Grizzlies (indoor)	26	(10)
1996–1998	San Jose Clash	57	(5)
1998	→ San Francisco Bay Seals (loan)	1	(0)
1999–2000	San Francisco Bay Seals	31	(4)
2001–2005	San Jose Earthquakes	82	(4)

International career
1990–1991	United States	9	(0)

Managerial career
- 2005–2007: California Cougars (indoor)
- * Club domestic league appearances and goals

Troy Michael Dayak (born January 29, 1971) is an American former soccer player who played as central defender. He spent his entire Major League Soccer career with the San Jose Clash/Earthquakes and nearly all of his professional career playing for Bay Area teams.

== Club career ==
=== San Francisco Bay Blackhawks ===
Dayak (nicknamed Cowboy) grew up in Walnut Creek, California and attended Livermore High School. In 1989, he attended the University of San Francisco for one year and then signed with the San Francisco Bay Blackhawks of the Western Soccer League (WSL). Seventeen years old at the time, he was the youngest player to sign with the WSL or its successor leagues, the APSL and A-League. In 1990, the WSL merged with the American Soccer League to form the American Professional Soccer League (APSL). In 1991, the Blackhawks won the APSL championship and Dayak was named a first team All Star. In 1993, the Blackhawks owner moved the team to the lower division USISL and renamed the team the San Jose Hawks. Despite going to the 1993 Sizzlin' Six tournament, the team folded at the end of the season.

=== Indoor soccer ===
In 1993, Troy signed with the Cleveland Crunch of the National Professional Soccer League (NPSL), helping lead them to the 1993–1994 NPSL title. In 1995, he signed with the San Jose Grizzlies of the Continental Indoor Soccer League (CISL).

=== MLS ===
In 1996, he was selected by MetroStars in second round of the Inaugural MLS Draft (19th overall). Troy, who had strong roots in the San Francisco Bay Area, refused to sign with the league and move his family to the New York area. Therefore, he was traded by the MetroStars to the San Jose Clash (later to be named the Earthquakes) in exchange for Rhett Harty and first round pick in 1996 College Draft. He was a solid starter for the Clash until, in August 1997, he suffered a violent collision snapping his head backwards. Troy's neck was already aggravated due to two previous neck injuries, and he was very close to becoming paralyzed. Troy was told that he would never play again. Nonetheless, in October 1997, he underwent surgery that fused a piece of bone from Troy's hip onto his 5th and 6th vertebrae. After a long march to recovery, he rejoined the Clash in 1998, going on loan to the San Francisco Bay Seals for one game, only to be waived at the end of the season. In 1999 Dayak signed with the San Francisco Bay Seals of the A-League. Early in the 1999 season, Dayak suffered a major knee injury damaging his medial collateral ligament (MCF) and posterior cruciate ligament (PCL). After a difficult recovery complicated by infection, Troy rejoined the Seals for the 2000 campaign as a player and coach. He was honored that season when he made the A League all stars. In 2001 Troy was signed by Frank Yallop, new head coach of the San Jose Earthquakes. When not suffering from a multitude of injuries (upper back sprain, shoulder sprain, neck sprain, abdominal strain, sports hernia, food poisoning), Troy has been a solid starter for the Quakes, helping lead the team to two MLS Cups in 2001 and 2003. Dayak earned the MLS Comeback Player of the Year Award in 2001. Dayak has scored eight goals and added seven assists in his seven years in the league.

== International career ==
Dayak had a notable youth soccer career playing in the U-16, U-20 and U-23 United States national soccer teams. He was part of the U-20 team to place fourth in the World Youth Championship in Saudi Arabia. He also represented the U.S. in 1992 Olympics in Barcelona. He also earned 9 caps for the senior national team. His earned his first cap on September 15, 1990, in a 3–0 win over Trinidad and Tobago. He entered the game in the 65th minute for Steve Pittman. His last game came on March 16, 1991, in the 1991 NAFC Championship, a 2–0 victory over Canada.

== Coaching ==
Troy has announced that he would retire after the 2005 MLS season. Even before his retirement became official, he was named head coach for the MISL expansion franchise, the California Cougars, who are based in Stockton, California.

== Post-retirement ==
June 2, 2005, Dayak was the Technical Director of the Livermore Youth Soccer League in Livermore, California. He is now the Founder and Director of Coaching for West Coast Soccer Club which is rapidly becoming one of the most dominant youth soccer clubs in the country. He holds a National "A" coaching license and in 2007 earned his NSCAA Director of Coaching Certification.

Troy owns a retail soccer store in Tracy, California, as well as an alfalfa farm. Married to wife Karen, they have two children, daughter Adaurie and son T.J.

He also provided color analysis for CSN Bay Area and CSN California broadcasts of San Jose Earthquakes games for the 2008 and 2009 Major League Soccer seasons.

== Honors ==
- MLS Comeback Player of the Year Award: 2001
- MLS Comeback Player of the Year Award: 2001
