= Dominic Kinnear =

American soccer coach and former player (born 1967)

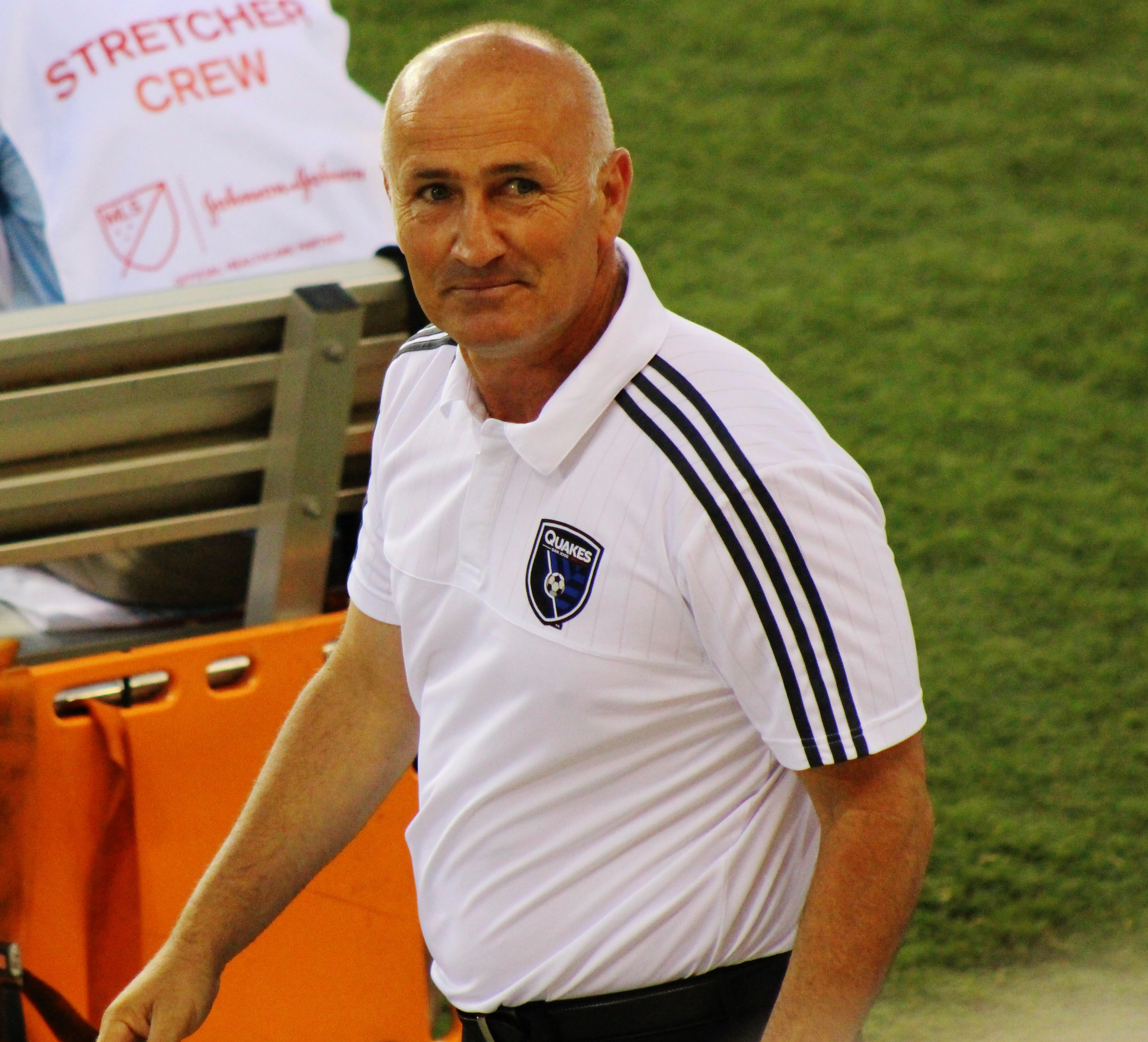
- Kinnear with the San Jose Earthquakes in 2015

Personal information
- Full name: Dominic Kinnear
- Date of birth: July 26, 1967 (age 59)
- Place of birth: Glasgow, Scotland
- Height: 5 ft 10 in (1.78 m)
- Position: Defender

Team information
- Current team: Sporting Kansas City (assistant)

Youth career
- 1985: Hartwick Hawks

Senior career*
Years	Team	Apps	(Gls)
1986–1989	St Johnstone	0	(0)
1989–1992	SF Bay Blackhawks	28	(6)
1993	San Jose Hawks	79	(7)
1994	Fort Lauderdale Strikers		
1995	Necaxa	5	(1)
1995	Seattle Sounders	6	(2)
1996	Colorado Rapids	14	(0)
1997	San Jose Clash	28	(2)
1998–2000	Tampa Bay Mutiny	75	(4)
Total		243	(16)

International career
1990–1994	United States	54	(9)

Managerial career
- 2001–2003: San Jose Earthquakes (assistant)
- 2004–2005: San Jose Earthquakes
- 2005–2014: Houston Dynamo
- 2014–2017: San Jose Earthquakes
- 2017–2018: LA Galaxy (assistant)
- 2018: LA Galaxy (interim)
- 2019–2020: LA Galaxy (assistant)
- 2020: LA Galaxy (interim)
- 2022–2025: FC Cincinnati (assistant)
Medal record
Representing United States
Winner	CONCACAF Gold Cup	1991
Runner-up	CONCACAF Gold Cup	1993
Men's Soccer
- * Club domestic league appearances and goals as of November 5, 2014

Dominic Kinnear (born July 26, 1967) is an American soccer coach and former player, he is the currently assistant coach of Major League Soccer club Sporting Kansas City.

As a player, he began his professional career with Scottish club St Johnstone, and went on to play for several teams in the United States and Mexico, including the San Jose Hawks, San Jose Clash, Tampa Bay Mutiny and Necaxa. He also earned 54 caps with the United States national team.

Kinnear has been involved in coaching MLS teams since 2001. His most notable stint was from 2006 to 2014 with the Houston Dynamo, a club he led to MLS Cup in 2006 and again in 2007.

== Youth career ==
Kinnear moved to the United States with his family when he was three years old. He grew up in Fremont, California, which he considers to be his hometown. He began playing youth soccer at the age of five before attending John F. Kennedy High School where he played on the boys' varsity soccer team. After graduating from high school, he attended Hartwick College for a single year. As a defender, he scored three goals as Hartwick went to the Final Four.

== Club career ==
Kinnear moved back to Scotland to try his luck with Scottish Football League club St Johnstone.

=== United States (1989–94) ===
In 1989, Kinnear signed with the San Francisco Bay Blackhawks of the Western Soccer League (WSL). Kinnear remained with San Francisco Bay as the Blackhawks became one of the dominant teams of the era. In 1990, the WSL merged with the American Soccer League (ASL) to form the American Professional Soccer League (APSL). That season Kinnear again earned All Star honors. In 1991, the Blackhawks took the APSL title and in 1992 went to the semifinals of the CONCACAF Champions Cup. Kinnear again earned All Star honors in 1992. In 1993, the Blackhawks owner pulled the team from the APSL and moved it to the lower division USISL, renaming the team the San Jose Hawks in the process. Despite the move to the lower division and a winning season, the Hawks folded at the end of the season.

Kinnear then moved to the Fort Lauderdale Strikers for the 1994 APSL season after a summer trial with English club Bolton Wanderers came to nothing.

=== Necaxa (1995) ===
In 1995, Kinnear played a single season with Primera División (First Division) team Necaxa. He scored one goal in five appearances as Necaxa took the Mexican League title.

=== Return to the United States (1995–2000) ===
At the end of the Mexican season, Kinnear moved to the Seattle Sounders of the A League just in time to win another league championship. He signed with the Sounders on August 10, 1995, as a replacement for injured Dick McCormick. In the championship final, he scored the winning penalty kick.

On January 24, 1996, Major League Soccer (MLS) allocated Kinnear to the Colorado Rapids, making him one of the first players in the league. Kinnear spent the 1996 season with the Rapids. On December 15, 1996, the Rapids traded Kinnear and a second round draft pick to the San Jose Clash for Paul Bravo and Rafael Amaya. He later moved to the Tampa Bay Mutiny. He scored six goals and 24 assists in his career in MLS. In February 2001, Kinnear retired and joined the San Jose Earthquakes coaching staff that was led by his former Mutiny teammate Frank Yallop. Kinnear had initially thought he was being recruited to play before Yallop mentioned coaching.

== International career ==
Kinnear earned 54 caps for the U.S. national team, including many of his country's warm-up games for the 1994 FIFA World Cup, although he was not selected for the final squad.

== Coaching career ==
In 2001, the head coach of the San Jose Earthquakes, Frank Yallop, named Dominic Kinnear as his assistant coach. Together, they helped coach the Earthquakes to the MLS Cup in 2001 and 2003.

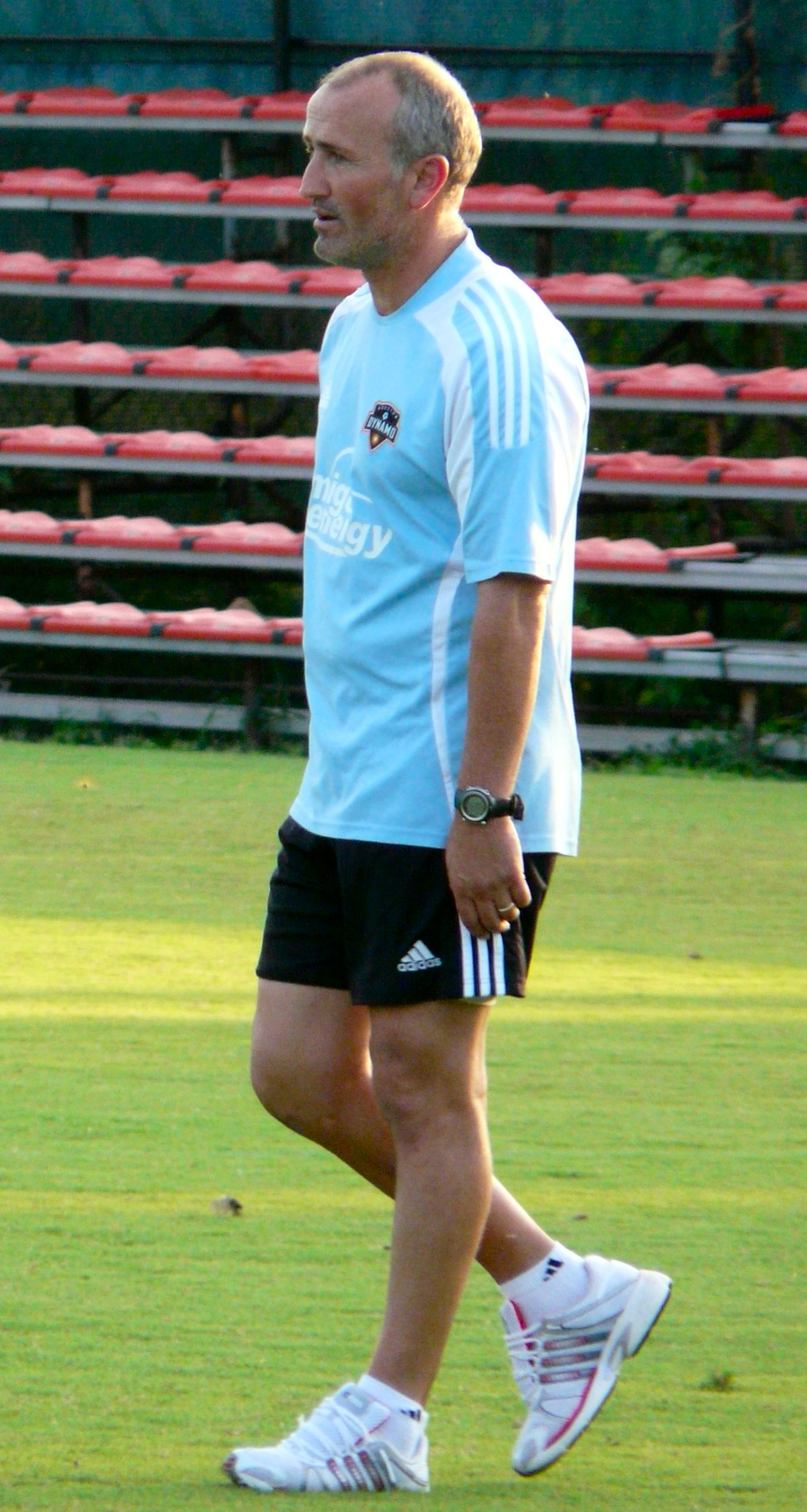
Kinnear with Houston in 2008

In 2004, Frank Yallop left and Kinnear was promoted to head coach of the Earthquakes. He led the Quakes to the MLS Supporters' Shield in 2005. Kinnear moved to Houston with the rest of the Earthquakes, when the team was renamed the Houston Dynamo. On November 12, 2006, Kinnear led the Dynamo to their first MLS Cup Championship. On November 18, 2007, the Dynamo won their second MLS Cup in a row, again beating the New England Revolution. Kinnear resigned as head coach of Houston Dynamo effectively as of October 25, 2014, after their last match of the regular season.

Kinnear became the new head coach of San Jose Earthquakes following the conclusion of the 2014 regular season He replaced Mark Watson, who was fired on October 15, 2014. On June 25, 2017, Kinnear was fired as head coach of the Earthquakes and was replaced by Chris Leitch.

On January 18, 2022, he was named an assistant coach by FC Cincinnati, his first coaching role since serving as the interim head coach of the LA Galaxy. On December 11, 2025, the club announced Kinnear had departed after four seasons on the staff.

== Career statistics ==
=== International goals ===
#	Date	Venue	Opponent	Score	Result	Competition
1	November 11, 1991	Dallas, Texas	Costa Rica	1–1	1–1	Friendly
2	April 4, 1992	Palo Alto, California	China	3–0	5–0	Friendly
3	February 6, 1993	Santa Barbara, California	Romania	1–0	1–1	Friendly
4	March 3, 1993	Costa Mesa, California	Canada	1–0	2–2	Friendly
5	June 22, 1993	Quito, Ecuador	Venezuela	3–0	3–3	1993 Copa América
6	November 14, 1993	Mission Viejo, California	Cayman Islands	1–0	8–1	Friendly
7	November 14, 1993	Mission Viejo, California	Cayman Islands	3–0	8–1	Friendly
8	December 5, 1993	Los Angeles, California	El Salvador	1–0	7–0	Friendly
9	December 5, 1993	Los Angeles, California	El Salvador	4–0	7–0	Friendly

=== Coaching record ===
As of game played on November 8, 2020

Team	From	To	Record					Ref
Team	From	To	P	W	D	L	Win %	Ref
San Jose Earthquakes	January 6, 2004	December 15, 2005	73	31	23	19	42.47	
Houston Dynamo	December 15, 2005	October 25, 2014	376	152	107	117	40.43	
San Jose Earthquakes	October 25, 2014	June 25, 2017	89	28	28	33	31.46	
LA Galaxy (interim)	September 10, 2018	December 28, 2018	6	3	1	2	50.00	
LA Galaxy (interim)	October 29, 2020	November 8, 2020	3	1	1	1	33.33	
Total			547	215	160	172	39.31	—

- 1.Record includes league, cup, playoffs and CONCACAF competitions.

== Honors ==
=== Player ===
San Francisco Bay Blackhawks

- APSL (1): 1991

Necaxa

- Primera División de México (1): 1994–95

Seattle Sounders (USL)

- A-League (1995–2004) (1): 1995 A-League

United States

- CONCACAF Gold Cup (1): 1991

=== Coach ===
San Jose Earthquakes

- MLS Supporters' Shield: 2005

Houston Dynamo

- MLS Cup (2): 2006, 2007
- Western Conference (2): 2006, 2007
- Eastern Conference (2): 2011, 2012

==== Assistant Coach ====
San Jose Earthquakes

- MLS Cup (2): 2001, 2003
- Western Conference (1): 2003

FC Cincinnati

- MLS Supporters' Shield: 2023

== See also ==
- List of current MLS coaches
- List of United States men's international soccer players born outside the United States
