= San Francisco Bay Blackhawks =

Former professional soccer team

San Francisco Bay Blackhawks were a professional soccer team which came into existence in 1989 as a team in the Western Soccer League (WSL). The Blackhawks spent time in the American Professional Soccer League (APSL) and the United States Interregional Soccer League (USISL). In 1993, the team competed in USISL as the San Jose Hawks, but left organized competition at the end of the season.

== History ==
Based on the west coast of the United States, the Western Soccer Alliance (WSA) came into existence in 1985 as a means of providing semi-pro and amateur clubs an opportunity to compete outside of their local areas. The WSA was given additional impetus by the collapse of the North American Soccer League (NASL) at the end of the 1984 NASL season. One former NASL team, the San Jose Earthquakes, entered the WSA as a charter member. In 1988, the Earthquakes' new owner, Bill Lunghi, withdrew the Earthquakes from the WSA. In response, the WSA awarded a franchise to Dan Van Voorhis, a San Francisco Bay Area-based real estate lawyer. Van Voorhis had gotten his start in real estate when he and his partner provided the legal expertise for the creation of the Blackhawk Ranch housing development. Van Voorhis named his new team, which competed in the newly renamed Western Soccer League's North Division, the San Francisco Bay Blackhawks.

=== Western Soccer League ===
In 1989, the Blackhawks immediately put their stamp on the league as one of the top teams. It ran to an 11–5 record and 98 points, second only to the San Diego Nomads 12–4 record and 99 points. In the playoffs, the Blackhawks downed the Los Angeles Heat in penalty kicks before losing 1–0 to the Nomads in the final game.

=== American Professional Soccer League ===
At the end of the 1989 season, the WSL merged with the east coast-based American Soccer League to form the American Professional Soccer League (APSL). While this was notionally the first true national soccer league since the collapse of the NASL in 1984, in actuality, the WSL and ASL continued as separate leagues with teams from the two leagues meeting only in the championship game. The Blackhawks had the best record in the WSL this year. In the playoffs, they first defeated 2–1 the Colorado Foxes, then won the title series two games to one over the Los Angeles Heat. In the APSL championship game, the Maryland Bays stopped the Blackhawks’ run with a victory in penalty kicks.

=== Champions ===
In 1991, the APSL experienced a rapid contraction as most team owners realized they had jumped too quickly into a national league. Only three of the eleven 1990 WSL teams began the 1991 season, and the Salt Lake Sting folded before the season ended. However, the Blackhawks continued their strong play, finishing with a 17–4 record, the second best in the league. In the playoffs, the Blackhawks defeated the Fort Lauderdale Strikers in the semifinals, then won their first and only championship with a victory over the Albany Capitals.

=== 1992 CONCACAF Champions Cup ===
The Blackhawks gained even greater honors when they entered the 1992 CONCACAF Champions' Cup due to their 1991 APSL title. They were placed in Group 2 of the Cup's North/Central Zone. On May 27 and 29, 1992, the Blackhawks hosted the Eurokickers of Panama, taking the two-game series, 11–0. In the second round on April 18 and May 3, they dismantled La Victoria of Belize, on a 5–2 aggregate score. In the third round on June 14 and 16, the Blackhawks crushed Real España of Honduras 6–0 on aggregate. With a bye in the fourth round because of the Vancouver 86ers' withdrawal from the competition, they found themselves in their zone championship series. Here the Blackhawks' run came to an end as Club América of Mexico won 4–3 on aggregate. Mexican great Hugo Sánchez scored three of América's goals.

While the Blackhawks outran their CONCACAF competition, they did not see similar domestic success. In 1992, the APSL was down to five teams from the eight that had finished the 1991 season. The Blackhawks were also beginning to fade, finishing the season in third place with an even record of 8–8. While they made the playoffs, they lost to the Tampa Bay Rowdies in the first round. Van Voorhis elected to withdraw from the APSL as his team was bleeding money, and enter them in the lower level United States Interregional Soccer League (USISL).

=== USISL: San Jose Hawks ===
In 1993, the Blackhawks found themselves both in a new league and with a new name. USISL had placed the team in the Pacific Division which was loaded with local San Francisco teams, including the San Francisco United All Blacks, San Francisco Bay Diablos, North Bay Breakers and East Bay Red Riders. The name change, to the San Jose Hawks, allowed them to differentiate themselves from the competition. Regardless of the name, the Hawks quickly rose to divisional domination, running to a 14–2 record and 119 points, second in the league. In the divisional semi-finals, the Hawks crushed the Chico Rooks 6–0, then easily handled the All Blacks 3–0. In the USISL, the divisional champions then entered what was called the Sizzling Six Championship. The six teams played two games in order to determine who would go to the championship game. While this reduced travel cost, it left a lot to be desired as the Hawks continued to crush their competition, defeating the East Los Angeles Cobras 4–1, and the Dallas Americans 4–1. Despite these two victories, the Hawks did not make the championship game, losing out to the Greensboro Dynamo and Orlando Lions on goal differential.

Van Voorhis folded the team at the end of the 1993 season after losing money in a soccer-related lawsuit.

In 1994, shortly after having successfully landed a San Jose Major League Soccer franchise and handing over all existing Hawks player contracts, front-office resources and the rights to play in Spartan Stadium to MLS in exchange for Type C stock in the league, Van Voorhis was forced to accept a buyout from the league because of financial difficulties stemming from a divorce. This left the franchise (subsequently named the San Jose Clash) league-owned for several years.

== Year-by-year ==
Year	Name	League	Record	Regular season	Playoffs	Open Cup
1989	San Francisco Bay Blackhawks	WSL	11–5	1st Northern Division	Final	Did not enter
1990	San Francisco Bay Blackhawks	APSL	13–7	1st WSL Conference	Final	Did not enter
1991	San Francisco Bay Blackhawks	APSL	17–4	2d Western Conference	Champions	Did not enter
1992	San Francisco Bay Blackhawks	APSL	8–8	3rd	Semifinals	Did not enter
1993	San Jose Hawks	USISL	14–2	1st Pacific Division	Sizzling Six	Did not enter

== Honors ==
APSL Champions

- 1991

CONCACAF Champions' Cup

- 1992 North/Central America Championship Series

Rookie of the Year

- 1991 Paul Bravo

First Team All Star

- 1989 John Doyle, John Hill, Dominic Kinnear
- 1990 Marcelo Balboa, John Doyle, John Hill, Dominic Kinnear, Townsend Qin,
- 1991 Mark Dougherty, Marcelo Balboa, Troy Dayak, Danny Pena, Derek Van Rheenen, Townsend Qin
- 1992 Danny Pena, Jorge Salazar, Dominic Kinnear
- 1993 Derek Van Rheenen, Justin Wall

Second Team All Star

- 1989 Troy Dayak, Steve Corpening
- 1991 Chance Fry, Dominic Kinnear

WSL Top Goalscorer

- 1989 Steve Corpening

== Head coaches ==
- Dean Wurzberger (1989–1990)
- Laurie Calloway (1991–1992)

== Owner ==
- Dan Van Voorhis

== Stadiums ==
While the Blackhawks are best known for playing in Spartan Stadium, they spent most of 1991 in Newark Memorial Stadium. The team also played games in Buck Shaw Stadium and Fremont Stadium.
