= 1990 American Professional Soccer League =

American Professional Soccer League
- Season: 1990
- Teams: 22
- Champions: Maryland Bays (1st Title)
- Premiers: Fort Lauderdale Strikers* (1st Title)
- Matches: 220
- Goals: 694 (3.15 per match)
- Best Player: (United States) Philip Gyau (East); Mark Dodd, Colorado Foxes (West)
- Top goalscorer: (United States) Chance Fry, Seattle Storm (17 goals) (West) and Overall (United States) Mike Masters (14 Goals) (East)
- Best goalkeeper: (United States) Dale Caya, Penn-Jersey Spirit (East) (United States) Mark Dodd, Colorado Foxes (West)

Overview of the 1990 American Professional Soccer League season. Although the Western Soccer League and the American Soccer League merged to form the American Professional Soccer League in 1990, the two leagues remained essentially independent leagues, linked by name alone. During this season, they ran separate regular season schedules with two different points systems. They each had their own playoff formats, had separate league MVPs and had their own All-League teams. The first game between the two leagues came in September when the Maryland Bays of the American Soccer League defeated the San Francisco Bay Blackhawks of the Western Soccer League for the American Professional Soccer League championship.

== History ==
On September 9, 1989, the champions of the west coast-based Western Soccer Alliance and the east coast-based American Soccer League played each other for the national championship. This was the first meeting between teams from the two leagues but was part of a larger effort to merge the two leagues. This effort resulted in the creation of the American Professional Soccer League on February 22, 1990. The merger remained one of name only as the two leagues played separate schedules and named separate MVPs and All-League teams. However, it allowed the teams to market themselves as members of a national league. During the playoffs, except for the West semifinals and the APSL finals, teams played a home and away series. However, they needed to win two games, so in the case of a tie after two games, the teams played a thirty-minute mini-game. If the game remained tied, the two teams would enter a shoot out. A shoot out pitted a field player against the opposing team's goalkeeper. The field player had five seconds to take a shot on goal beginning 35 yards from the goal.

== League standings ==
=== East (American Soccer League) Conference ===
Points:

- Win: 3
- Shoot out win: 2
- Shoot out loss: 1

==== Northern Division ====
Pos	Team	Pld	W	PKW	PKL	L	GF	GA	GD	Pts
1	Maryland Bays	20	14	1	0	5	42	29	+13	44
2	Albany Capitals	20	13	1	1	5	35	22	+13	42
3	Penn-Jersey Spirit	20	12	1	1	6	34	23	+11	39
4	Boston Bolts	20	8	1	2	9	27	27	0	28
5	Washington Stars	20	7	0	0	13	24	28	−4	21
6	New Jersey Eagles	20	5	1	0	14	21	38	−17	17

==== Southern Division ====
Pos	Team	Pld	W	PKW	PKL	L	GF	GA	GD	Pts
1	Fort Lauderdale Strikers	20	14	1	1	4	38	22	+16	45
2	Tampa Bay Rowdies	20	9	1	0	10	32	39	−7	29
3	Orlando Lions	20	8	0	0	12	25	30	−5	24
4	Miami Freedom	20	7	1	1	11	27	29	−2	24
5	Washington Diplomats	20	4	1	2	13	22	40	−18	16

=== West (Western Soccer League) Conference ===
Points:

- Win: 6
- Shoot out win: 4
- Shoot out loss: 2
- 1 bonus point per goal scored in regulation, maximum of 3 per game

==== North Division ====
Pos	Team	Pld	W	PKW	PKL	L	GF	GA	GD	BP	Pts
1	San Francisco Bay Blackhawks	20	9	4	1	6	39	30	+9	32	104
2	Salt Lake Sting	20	11	1	1	7	39	34	+5	32	104
3	Colorado Foxes	20	10	4	3	3	22	12	+10	18	100
4	Portland Timbers	20	8	2	3	7	42	36	+6	37	99
5	Seattle Storm	20	9	1	3	7	42	35	+7	29	93

==== South Division ====
Pos	Team	Pld	W	PKW	PKL	L	GF	GA	GD	BP	Pts
1	California Emperors	20	8	2	3	7	35	32	+3	27	89
2	Real Santa Barbara	20	9	1	3	7	33	35	−2	23	87
3	Los Angeles Heat	20	8	3	1	8	39	39	0	23	85
4	San Diego Nomads	20	5	3	3	9	22	28	−6	19	67
5	New Mexico Chilies	20	5	2	1	12	25	45	−20	21	61
6	Arizona Condors	20	5	0	1	14	29	51	−22	27	59

== East Conference playoffs ==
=== East bracket ===
Semifinals; Best-of-3
S1	Fort Lauderdale Strikers	3	2	-
N2	Albany Capitals	2	0	-
N1	Maryland Bays	2	4	-
S2	Tampa Bay Rowdies	1	1	-

1990 East Finals; Best-of-3
S1	Fort Lauderdale Strikers	2	0	-
N1	Maryland Bays	3	2	-

=== Semifinal 1 ===
August 10, 1990
7:30 PM EST

Albany Capitals (NY)	2–3	Fort Lauderdale Strikers (FL)
Chris Szanto 6:10' (Chinapoo, Masters); Paul Mariner 45:00' (Masters, Smyth)	Report	Ricardo Alonso 117:15' (Carrera, Donev); Jimmy McGeough, Jr. 73:05' (James, Carrera); Pedro Magallanes 77:45' (James, Alonso)

Bleecker Stadium, Albany, New York
Attendance: 750
Referee: (USA)
August 12, 1990
5:00 PM EST

Fort Lauderdale Strikers (FL)	2–0	Albany Capitals (NY)
Ricardo Alonso 37:41' (Magallanes, McGeough); Alvin James 85:00'; Arnie Mausser (yellow card) 89'	Report	Bobby Cumming (yellow card) 22'; Steve Stokoe (yellow card) 42'

Royal Palm Polo Club, Boca Raton, Florida
Attendance: 2,483
Referee: (USA)

The Fort Lauderdale Strikers advance to the East Finals.

=== Semifinal 2 ===
August 10, 1990
8:00 PM EST

Tampa Bay Rowdies (FL)	1–2 (a.e.t.)	Maryland Bays (MD)
Perry Van der Beck (yellow card) 21:21'; Mark Wright 80:54' (Hooper, Byrne)	Report	Kurt Dasbach 34:01' (Ryerson, Nattans); Jean Harbor 96:27' (Abe)

USF Soccer Stadium, Tampa, Florida
Attendance: 2,411
Referee: (USA)
August 12, 1990
7:00 PM EST

Tampa Bay Rowdies (FL)	1–4	Maryland Bays (MD)
Jeff Jones 7:35' (Hill)	Report	Jean Harbor 4:30' (Abe); Philip Gyau 18:45' (Harbor, Sloan); Jean Harbor 45:38' (Abe, Barger); John Abe 72:36' (Nattans)

Cedar Lane Park, Maryland
Attendance: 2,953
Referee: (USA)

The Maryland Bays advance to the East Finals.

=== Conference Finals ===
August 18, 1990
8:00 PM EST

Maryland Bays (MD)	3–2	Fort Lauderdale Strikers (FL)
John Abe 13:57' (Barger, Namazi); Jean Harbor 71:29' (Gee); Joe Barger 87:28' (Ryerson); Darryl Gee (red card)	Report 1 Report 2	Pedro Magallanes 49:57' (Donev); Marcelo Carrera 52:00'; Troy Edwards (red card)

Cedar Lane Park
Attendance: 3,116
Referee: (USA)
August 25, 1990
5:00 PM EST

Fort Lauderdale Strikers (FL)	0–2	Maryland Bays (MD)
Victor Moreland (yellow card) 49:14'; Ricardo Alonso (yellow card) 65:50'	Report	Philip Gyau 1:32' (Ryerson); Rob Ryerson (yellow card) 13:38'; Scott Cook 16:08', (yellow card) 30:10'; Omid Namazi (yellow card) 22:45'; Jean Harbor (yellow card) 43:15'

Royal Palm Polo Club, Boca Raton, Florida
Attendance: 2,527
Referee: (USA)

The Maryland Bays advance to the APSL Championship.

== West Conference playoffs ==
=== West bracket ===
First Round; Best-of-3
S2	Real Santa Barbara	1	1	0
S3	Los Angeles Heat	0	2	1
N2	Salt Lake Sting	0	1	-
N3	Colorado Foxes	2	4	-

Division Finals; Single Match
S1	California Emperors	0	-	-
S3	Los Angeles Heat	2	-	-
N1	San Francisco Bay Blackhawks	2	-	-
N3	Colorado Foxes	1	-	-

1990 West Finals; Best-of-3
S3	Los Angeles Heat	2	1(2)	0
N1	San Francisco Bay Blackhawks	0	1(4)	1

=== First Round Series 1 ===
August 18, 1990
6:00 PM EST

Los Angeles Heat (CA)	0–1	Real Santa Barbara (CA)
Brian Wendel (red card) 71:01' (yellow card) (yellow card) (yellow card)	Report 1 Report 2	Jim Hutchinson 68:44' (yellow card) (yellow card) (yellow card) (yellow card)

West High School, Torrance, California
Attendance: 1,910
Referee: Thomas Bobapilla, (USA)

August 21, 1990

Real Santa Barbara (CA)	1–2	Los Angeles Heat (CA)
Femi Olukanni 29:39' (yellow card) (yellow card) (yellow card)	Report 1 Report 2	Danny Pena 63:03' (Ervine), (yellow card); Mike Getchell 64:23' (Sacks), (yellow card) (yellow card) (yellow card)

La Playa Stadium, Santa Barbara, California
Attendance: 700
Referee: (USA)

August 21, 1990
mini-game

Real Santa Barbara (CA)	0–1	Los Angeles Heat (CA)
	Report 1 Report 2	Mike Getchell 19:51' (yellow card) (yellow card)

La Playa Stadium, Santa Barbara, California
Attendance: 700
Referee: (USA)

The Los Angeles Heat advance to the Division Finals.

=== First Round Series 2 ===
August 18, 1990

Colorado Foxes (CO)	2–0	Salt Lake Sting (UT)
John Klein 76'; Mike Mikes 83'	Report

Jefferson County Stadium, Colorado
Attendance: 4,019
Referee: (USA)

August 22, 1990
10:00 PM EST

Salt Lake Sting (UT)	1–4	Colorado Foxes (CO)
Barney Boyce 55' (pen.)		44' Mike Mikes; 67' Robin Fraser; 72', 89' Efren Rodarte

Derks Field, Salt Lake City, Utah
Attendance: 3,210
Referee: (USA)

The Colorado Foxes advance to the Division Finals.

=== Division Finals ===
August 25, 1990
6:00 PM EST

California Emperors (CA)	0–2	Los Angeles Heat (CA)
Booked	Report 1 Report 2	41:02' Brad Smith; 89:00' Jim Gabarra; (yellow card) , (yellow card) , (yellow card); (yellow card) , (yellow card) , (yellow card)

University of Redlands, Redlands, California
Attendance: 3,823
Referee: (USA)

The Los Angeles Heat advance to the Conference Finals.

August 25, 1990

San Francisco Bay Blackhawks (CA)	2–1	Colorado Foxes (CO)
Troy Dayak 13:02' (Kinnear), 39:38' (Wynalda)	Report 1 Report 2	Larry McPhail 7:56' (Ashton)

Newark Memorial High School, Newark, California
Attendance: 2,600
Referee: (USA)

The San Francisco Bay Blackhawks advance to the Conference Finals.

=== Conference Finals ===
September 8, 1990
7:30 PM PST

Los Angeles Heat (CA)	2–0	San Francisco Bay Blackhawks (CA)
Jim Gabarra 20:43'; Brad Smith 55:24' (Bruch)	Report 1 Report 2

Veterans Stadium, Long Beach, California
Attendance: 3,500
Referee: (USA)
September 12, 1990
8:00 PM PST

San Francisco Bay Blackhawks (CA)	1–1	Los Angeles Heat (CA)
Tim Martin (yellow card) 23'; Eric Wynalda 36:53'	Report 1 Report 2	Nathan Sacks (yellow card) 7'; Joe Flanagan (yellow card) 28'; Danny Pena (yellow card) 35'; Waldir Guerra 71:00' (Ervine)
Penalties
Peter Isaacs (penalty scored); Steve Corpening (penalty scored); Dave Palic (penalty missed); Townsend Qin (penalty scored); Steve Petuskey (penalty scored)	4–2	(penalty scored) Waldir Guerra; (penalty scored) Mike Gregorian; (penalty missed) Bobby Bruch; (penalty missed) Mike Getchell

Spartan Stadium, San Jose, California
Attendance: 3,800
Referee: Kun Ho Yoo (USA)
September 12, 1990

San Francisco Bay Blackhawks (CA)	1–0	Los Angeles Heat (CA)
Dominic Kinnear 22:43' (Gallo)	Report 1 Report 2	Mike Getchell (red card) 20'

Spartan Stadium, San Jose, California
Attendance: 3,800
Referee: Kun Ho Yoo (USA)

The San Francisco Bay Blackhawks advance to the APSL Championship.

== APSL Final ==
September 23, 1990

Maryland Bays (MD)	1–1	San Francisco Bay Blackhawks (CA)
Scott Cook 73:36'	Report 1 Report 2	(yellow card) 52' Eric Wynalda; 82:38' Peter Isaacs
Penalties
Jean Harbor (penalty scored); Omid Namazi (penalty scored); Scott Cook (penalty scored) ? (penalty missed); John Abe (penalty scored)	4–3	(penalty scored) Dominic Kinnear; (penalty scored) Tim Martin; (penalty scored) Townsend Qin; (penalty missed) Marcelo Balboa; (penalty missed) Steve Petuskey

Nickerson Field, Boston, Massachusetts
Attendance: 4,881
Referee: (USA)

The Maryland Bays win the APSL Championship.

== Combined points leaders ==
Rank	Scorer	Club	Goals	Assists	Points
1	(United States) Chance Fry	Seattle Storm	17	5	39
2	(United States) George Pastor	Salt Lake Sting	14	9	37
3	(United States) Mike Masters	Albany Capitals	14	4	32
4	(United States) Philip Gyau	Maryland Bays	12	6	30
5	(United States) Derek Sanderson	Salt Lake Sting	11	6	28
6	(United States) Jerry O'Hara	California Emperors	10	3	23
7	(United States) Shawn Medved	Portland Timbers	10	2	22
8	(United States) Jean Harbor	Maryland Bays	8	6	22
9	(United States) Jim Hutchinson	Real Santa Barbara	9	4	22
10	(United States) Scott Benedetti	Seattle Storm	9	3	21
11	(United States) Cesar Plasencia	Real Santa Barbara	9	3	21
11	(United States) Steve Pittman	Fort Lauderdale Strikers	7	7	21
11	(England) David Byrne	Tampa Bay Rowdies	5	10	20
11	(United States) Steve Corpening	San Francisco Bay Blackhawks	8	4	20
11	(United States) Rob Paterson	Portland Timbers	8	4	20
11	(Canada) Mike Sweeney	Boston Bolts	8	3	19
11	(United States) Elvis Comrie	Albany Capitals	8	2	18
11	(Hungary) Lazlo Barna	Miami Freedom	7	4	18
11	(United States) Duane Robinson	Penn-Jersey Spirit	5	8	18

== Honors ==
=== East (American Soccer League) Conference ===
- MVP: Philip Gyau
- Leading goal scorer: Mike Masters
- Leading goalkeeper: Dale Caya
- Rookie of the Year: Steve Pittman
- Coach of the Year: Thomas Rongen

First Team All League

- Goalkeeper: Dale Caya
- Defenders: Steve Pittman, Paul Mariner, Brian Ainscough, George Gelnovatch
- Midfielders: Chico Borja, Marcelo Carrera, David Byrne
- Forwards: Philip Gyau, Dan Donigan, Jean Harbor

Second Team All League

- Goalkeeper: Arnie Mausser
- Defenders: Jimmy McGeough, Jr., Chris Reif, Thomas Rongen, Dave Smyth
- Midfielders: Paul Dougherty, Eric Eichmann, Pat O'Kelly
- Forwards: Mike Masters, Bruce Murray, Paul Riley

=== West (Western Soccer League) Conference ===
- MVP: Mark Dodd
- Leading goal scorer: Chance Fry
- Leading goalkeeper: Mark Dodd

First Team All League

- Goalkeeper: Mark Dodd
- Defenders: Marcelo Balboa, John Doyle, Robin Fraser, Danny Pena
- Midfielders: Dominic Kinnear, Fran O'Brien, George Pastor
- Forwards: Chance Fry, Mark Kerlin, Townsend Qin

Second Team All League

- Goalkeeper: Anton Nistl
- Defenders: Steve Eise, Paul Krumpe, Derek Van Rheenen, Wade Webber
- Midfielders: John Bain, Mike Fox, Jeff Rogers, Dzung Tran
- Forwards: Scott Benedetti, Paul Wright
