= 1990 Fort Lauderdale Strikers season =

Fort Lauderdale Strikers
1990 season
- Owner(s): (United States) Joe Robbie; Noel Lemon
- Manager: Thomas Rongen
- Stadium: Lockhart Stadium
- APSL East, South Div.: First place
- APSL playoffs: Semi-finalist
Home colors	Away colors

The 1990 Fort Lauderdale Strikers season was the first season of the team in the new American Professional Soccer League. It was the club's twenty-fourth season in professional soccer. In the previous year, the club fielded the team in the American Soccer League which then merged with the Western Soccer Alliance to form the new APSL. In the inaugural year of the new league, the team finished in first place in the South Division of the East (American Soccer League) Conference. They went to the playoffs and made it to the finals of the East (American Soccer League) Conference being that year's Runners-up. At the end of the year, the team would merge with the league's Orlando Lions, creating a new unified team and club.

== Competitions ==
=== APSL regular season ===
==== East (American Soccer League) Conference ====
Points:

- Win: 3
- Shoot out win: 2
- Shoot out loss: 1

===== North Division =====
Place	Team	GP	W	SW	SL	L	GF	GA	Points
1	Maryland Bays	20	14	1	0	5	42	29	44
2	Albany Capitals	20	13	1	1	5	35	22	42
3	Penn-Jersey Spirit	20	12	1	1	6	34	23	39
4	Boston Bolts	20	8	1	2	9	27	27	28
5	Washington Stars	20	7	0	0	13	24	28	22
6	New Jersey Eagles	20	5	1	0	14	21	38	17

===== South Division =====
Place	Team	GP	W	SW	SL	L	GF	GA	Points
1	Fort Lauderdale Strikers	20	14	1	1	4	38	22	45
2	Tampa Bay Rowdies	20	9	1	0	10	32	39	29
3	Orlando Lions	20	8	0	0	12	25	30	24
4	Miami Freedom	20	7	1	1	11	27	29	24
5	Washington Diplomats	20	4	1	2	13	22	40	16

==== West (Western Soccer League) Conference ====
Points:

- Win: 6
- Shoot out win: 4
- Shoot out loss: 2
- 1 bonus point per goal scored in regulation, maximum of 3 per game

===== North Division =====
Place	Team	GP	W	SW	SL	L	GF	GA	Points
1	San Francisco Bay Blackhawks	20	9	4	1	6	39	30	104
2	Salt Lake Sting	20	11	1	1	7	39	34	104
3	Colorado Foxes	20	10	4	3	3	22	12	100
4	Portland Timbers	20	8	2	3	7	42	36	99
5	Seattle Storm	20	9	1	3	7	42	35	93

===== South Division =====
Place	Team	GP	W	SW	SL	L	GF	GA	Points
1	California Emperors	20	8	2	3	7	35	32	89
2	Real Santa Barbara	20	9	1	3	7	33	35	87
3	Los Angeles Heat	20	8	3	1	8	39	39	85
4	San Diego Nomads	20	5	3	3	9	22	28	67
5	New Mexico Chilies	20	5	2	1	12	25	45	61
6	Arizona Condors	20	5	0	1	14	29	51	59

=== APSL Eastern Conference Playoffs ===
==== Semifinal 1 ====
August 10, 1990
7:30 PM EST

Albany Capitals (NY)	2–3	Fort Lauderdale Strikers (FL)
Chris Szanto 6:10' (Chinapoo, Masters); Paul Mariner 45:00' (Masters, Smyth)	report	Ricardo Alonso 117:15' (Carrera, Donev); Jimmy McGeough, Jr. 73:05' (James, Carrera); Pedro Magallanes 77:45' (James, Alonso)

Bleecker Stadium, Albany, New York
Attendance: 750
Referee: (USA)
August 12, 1990
5:00 PM EST

Fort Lauderdale Strikers (FL)	2–0	Albany Capitals (NY)
Ricardo Alonso 37:41' (Magallanes, McGeough); Alvin James 85:00'; Arnie Mausser (yellow card) 89'	report	Bobby Cumming (yellow card) 22'; Steve Stokoe (yellow card) 42'

Royal Palm Polo Club, Boca Raton, Florida
Attendance: 2,483
Referee: (USA)

==== Semifinal 2 ====
August 10, 1990
8:00 PM EST

Tampa Bay Rowdies (FL)	1–2 (a.e.t.)	Maryland Bays (MD)
Perry Van der Beck (yellow card) 21:21'; Mark Wright 80:54' (Hooper, Byrne)	report	Kurt Dasbach 34:01' (Ryerson, Nattans); Jean Harbor 96:27' (Abe)

USF Soccer Stadium, Tampa, Florida
Attendance: 2,411
Referee: (USA)
August 12, 1990
7:00 PM EST

Tampa Bay Rowdies (FL)	1–4	Maryland Bays (MD)
Jeff Jones 7:35' (Hill)		Jean Harbor 4:30' (Abe); Philip Gyau 18:45' (Harbor, Sloan); Jean Harbor 45:38' (Abe, Barger); John Abe 72:36' (Nattans)

Cedar Lane Park, Maryland
Attendance: 2,953
Referee: (USA)

==== Final ====
August 18, 1990
8:00 PM EST

Maryland Bays (MD)	3–2	Fort Lauderdale Strikers (FL)
John Abe 13:57' (Barger, Namazi); Jean Harbor 71:29' (Gee); Joe Barger 87:28' (Ryerson); Darryl Gee (red card)	report 1 report 2	Pedro Magallanes 49:57' (Donev); Marcelo Carrera 52:00'; Troy Edwards (red card)

Cedar Lane Park
Attendance: 3,116
Referee: (USA)
August 25, 1990
5:00 PM EST

Fort Lauderdale Strikers (FL)	0–2	Maryland Bays (MD)
Victor Moreland (yellow card) 49:14'; Ricardo Alonso (yellow card) 65:50'	report	Philip Gyau 1:32' (Ryerson); Rob Ryerson (yellow card) 13:38'; Scott Cook 16:08', (yellow card) 30:10'; Omid Namazi (yellow card) 22:45'; Jean Harbor (yellow card) 43:15'

Royal Palm Polo Club, Boca Raton, Florida
Attendance: 2,527
Referee: (USA)
