= 1991 Fort Lauderdale Strikers season =

Fort Lauderdale Strikers
1991 season
- Owner(s): (United States) Joe Robbie; Noel Lemon
- Manager: Thomas Rongen
- Stadium: Lockhart Stadium
- APSL American Conference: First place
- APSL playoffs: Semifinalist
Home colors	Away colors

The 1991 Fort Lauderdale Strikers season was the second season of the team in the American Professional Soccer League. It was the club's twenty-fifth season in professional soccer. The team finished in first place in the American Conference, went to the playoffs, and made it to the semifinals.

Thomas Rongen was a player-coach for the Strikers. When asked why he was playing, team president Noel Lemon replied, "Because we want to win."

== Competitions ==
=== APSL regular season ===
==== American Conference ====
Place	Team	GP	W	L	WN	WE	WS	LN	LE	LS	GF	GA	GD	Points
1	Fort Lauderdale Strikers	21	15	6	11	0	4	3	1	2	39	21	+18	117
2	Albany Capitals	21	10	11	9	1	0	7	1	3	27	29	−2	92
3	Tampa Bay Rowdies	21	8	13	7	1	0	13	0	0	26	27	−1	69
4	Penn-Jersey Spirit	21	6	15	4	0	2	13	0	2	25	50	−25	61
5	Miami Freedom	21	6	15	5	0	1	14	1	0	19	53	−34	52

==== Western Conference ====
Place	Team	GP	W	L	WN	WE	WS	LN	LE	LS	GF	GA	GD	Points
1	Maryland Bays	21	19	2	17	1	1	2	0	0	54	23	+31	158
2	San Francisco Bay Blackhawks	21	17	4	12	1	4	2	1	1	33	16	+17	126
3	Colorado Foxes	21	13	8	11	1	1	7	0	1	36	27	+9	111
4	Salt Lake Sting	20	3	17	3	0	0	14	1	2	12	22	−10	33

=== APSL Playoffs ===
==== Semifinal 1 ====
September 6, 1991
7:35 PM EST

Albany Capitals (NY)	2–1 (OT)	Maryland Bays (MD)
Dave Smyth 2'; Lee Tschantret 101'		77' Kevin Sloan

Bleecker Stadium, Albany, New York
Attendance: 1,809

September 14, 1991

Maryland Bays (MD)	2–1	Albany Capitals (NY)
Philip Gyau 20'; Kevin Sloan 69'; Kevin Sloan (yellow card)		89' Chris Szanto

Cedar Lane Park, Maryland
Attendance: 2,741

September 14, 1991

Maryland Bays (MD)	0–0	Albany Capitals (NY)
	report
Penalties
Jean Harbor (penalty scored); Brian Haynes (penalty scored); Omid Namazi (penalty scored); John Abe (penalty missed); Scott Cook (penalty scored)	4–5	(penalty scored) John Garvey; (penalty scored) Scott Cannon; (penalty scored) Zoran Savic; (penalty scored) Mike Masters; (penalty scored) Lee Tschantret

Cedar Lane Park, Maryland
Attendance: 2,741
Referee: (USA)

The Albany Capitals advanced to the final.

==== Semifinal 2 ====
September 8, 1991
10:30 PM EST

San Francisco Bay Blackhawks (CA)	1–0 (OT)	Fort Lauderdale Strikers (FL)
Eric Wynalda (yellow card) 89:59'; Dominic Kinnear 96:33' (Qin, Salazar)	report	Adrian Gaiten (yellow card) 79:31'

Spartan Stadium, San Jose, California
Attendance: 6,041
Referee: Brian Hall
September 14, 1991
7:30 PM EST

Fort Lauderdale Strikers (FL)	0–1 (OT)	San Francisco Bay Blackhawks (CA)
John Clare (yellow card) 24:25'	report	Lawrence Lozzano (yellow card) 83:00'; Eric Wynalda 95:56' (Isaacs)

Lockhart Stadium, Fort Lauderdale, Florida
Attendance: 2,476
Referee: Raul Dominguez

The San Francisco Bay Blackhawks advanced to the final.
