= 1990 North American Club Championship =

North American Club Championship
Pepsi Cup
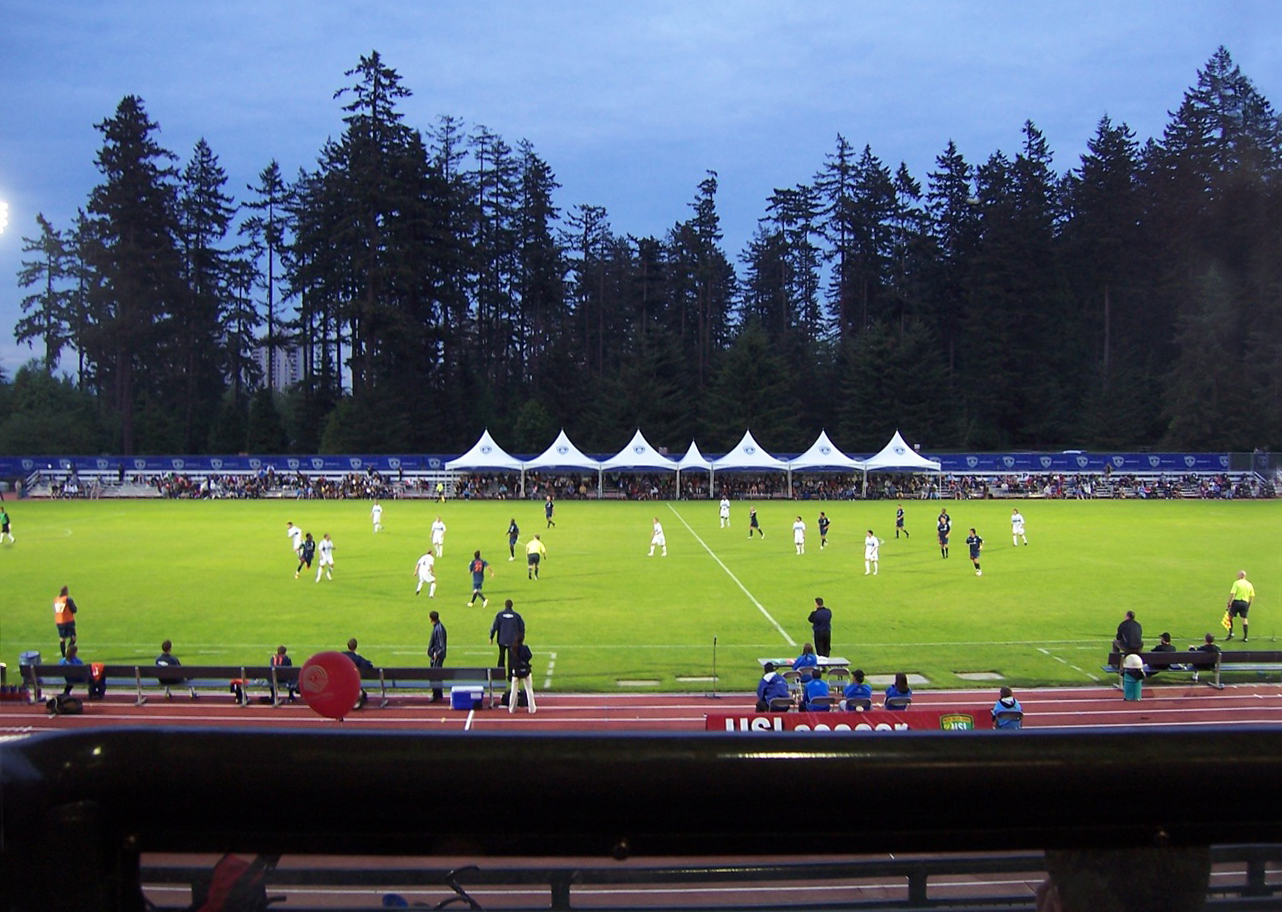
- Swangard Stadium hosted the match.
Vancouver 86ers	Maryland Bays
3	2
- Date: 26 September 1990
- Venue: Swangard Stadium, Burnaby, BC
- Attendance: 2,643

The 1990 North American Club Championship, also known as the Pepsi Cup for sponsorship reasons, was a post-season soccer competition contested by the winners from the Canadian Soccer League and the American Professional Soccer League.

== Teams ==
Team	League
Maryland Bays	American Professional Soccer League
Vancouver 86ers	Canadian Soccer League

== Background ==
The Maryland Bays of the American Professional Soccer League qualified for the match after having won the inaugural American Professional Soccer League season by defeating the San Francisco Bay Blackhawks 1–1 (4–3 on penalties) in the final just 3 days earlier.

The Vancouver 86ers qualified by winning the 1989 Canadian Soccer League Championship. At the time of the match, the 1990 Canadian Soccer League was still in its semi-finals phase, with Vancouver having just played to a 2–2 draw at the Victoria Vistas in game one.

The Vancouver 86ers were selected to host the match at Swangard Stadium.

=== Results summary ===
(Canada) Vancouver 86ers				Round	(United States) Maryland Bays			
Regular season
1989 Canadian Soccer League; West Division: 1st place: Pos / Team / Pld / Pts; 1 / Vancouver 86ers / 26 / 42; 2 / Edmonton Brick Men / 26 / 21; 3 / Calgary Strikers / 26 / 19; 4 / Winnipeg Fury / 26 / 19; 5 / Victoria Vistas / 26 / 14; Source: Canadian Soccer History Archives 1989 CSL Stats				Final standings	1990 American Professional Soccer League; Eastern Conference, North Division: 1st place: Pos / Team / Pld / Pts; 1 / Maryland Bays / 20 / 44; 2 / Albany Capitals / 20 / 42; 3 / Penn-Jersey Spirit / 20 / 39; 4 / Boston Bolts / 20 / 28; 5 / Washington Stars / 20 / 21; Source:			
Opponent	Agg.	1st leg	2nd leg	Playoffs	Opponent	Series	1st leg	2nd leg
bye				Conference Semifinals	Tampa Bay Rowdies	2 – 0	2–1 (A)	4–1 (H)
Edmonton Brick Men	9–3	5–3 (A)	4–0 (H)	Conference Finals	Fort Lauderdale Strikers	2 – 0	3–2 (H)	2–0 (A)
Hamilton Steelers	3–2 (H)			Final	San Francisco Bay Blackhawks	1–1 (4–3 p.) (N)		

== Match ==
=== Summary ===
The Vancouver 86ers dominated the first half of the match and took only fourteen minutes to open the scoring, with Domenic Mobilio finding the net after a series of short passes in the offensive end. Vancouver had a great opportunity to double their lead in the thirty-sixth minute after being awarded a penalty kick, however Steve Powers was able to deny Mobilio's second goal with a heroic punch of the ball. Despite the miss, Maryland would concede again four minutes later after Powers was rounded by Dale Mitchell to put Vancouver 2–0 up. This two goal lead did not last for long however, as Maryland's Kevin Sloan was able to exploit a defensive mistake and quickly slotted the ball past 86er goalkeeper, Paul Dolan, to keep them in the game in the forty-fourth minute.

The second half saw a change in both teams' performance, with Maryland looking much more hostile while Vancouver appeared to have lost their composure and intensity. Maryland leveled the game in the sixty-eighth minute courtesy of a Jean Harbor strike. Maryland had several more opportunities to score before full time, most notably when Maryland's John Abe struck the crossbar, and when Vancouver's Vlado Vanis was able to clear a Scott Cook shot off the goal line, but were unable to find a winner as the match went into extra-time.

After escaping defeat during their poor second half performance, Vancouver turned up in extra-time with much more energy, and eventually found the winner with just three minutes remaining as Mobilio scored his second of the match, making up for his first half penalty miss and securing the title for Vancouver.

=== Details ===
September 26, 1990
7:30 PDT
Championship

Vancouver 86ers	3–2 (a.e.t.)	Maryland Bays
Mobilio 14', 117'; Mitchell 40'	A-League archives [Vancouver Sun ]	Sloan 44'; Harbor 68'

Swangard Stadium, Burnaby, British Columbia
Attendance: 2,643

GK
Substitutes:
Manager:
(Canada) Bob Lenarduzzi

(Canada) Paul Dolan
Vlado Vanis
(United States) Stephen Burns	Booked
(Canada) Carl Valentine
(Canada) Domenic Mobilio
(Canada) John Catliff
(Canada) Dale Mitchell

GK
Substitutes:
Manager:
(United States) Pete Caringi Jr.

(United States) Steve Powers
(United States) Darryl Gee
(United States) Chris Reif
(United States) Jeff Nattans
(United States) Joe Barger
(United States) John Abe
(United States) Omid Namazi
(United States) Rob Ryerson	Booked
(United States) Kevin Sloan	(substituted off) 62'
(United States) Phillip Gyau
(Niger) Jean Harbor	Booked
(United States) Scott Cook	(substituted on) 62'

=== Result ===
North American Club Championship
1990 Winners
(Canada)
Vancouver 86ers
First title

== Match statistics ==
Statistic	Vancouver	Maryland
Goals scored	3	2
Total shots	22	10
Shots on target	10	5
Saves	3	7
Corner kicks	7	3
Offsides	1	2
Yellow Cards	0	2
Red Cards	0	0

== Aftermath ==
The Vancouver 86ers continued their winning ways in game 2 of the CSL semi-finals and defeated the Victoria Vistas 6–1 at Swangard Stadium just four days later to advance to the 1990 Canadian Soccer League Final. Vancouver then won their third playoff title following another 6–1 home victory against the Hamilton Steelers, and secured a treble of sorts, having won their, regular season, playoffs, and the North American Club Championship.

The North American Club Championship was not continued after the 1990 season, however a similar competition in 1992 was created as the Professional Cup to determine a North American champion from 3 professional leagues operating in Canada and the United States.

== See also ==
- CONCACAF Champions League
- 1990 North American Nations Cup — A round-robin tournament contested by Canada, Mexico, and the United States, also hosted at Swangard Stadium.
