= 1990 Orlando Lions season =

Orlando Lions
1990 season
- Manager: Gary Hindley
- American Professional Soccer League: Southern Division: Third place

The 1990 Orlando Lions season was the third season of the team in the newly formed American Professional Soccer League. In the previous year, the club fielded the team in the American Soccer League which then merged with the Western Soccer Alliance to form the new APSL. In the inaugural year of the new league, the team finished in third place in the Southern Division of the league. At the end of the year, the team merged with the Fort Lauderdale Strikers, creating a new unified team and club.

== Competitions ==
=== APSL regular season ===
==== East (American Soccer League) Conference ====
Points:

- Win: 3
- Shoot out win: 2
- Shoot out loss: 1

==== North Division ====
Place	Team	GP	W	SW	SL	L	GF	GA	Points
1	Maryland Bays	20	14	1	0	5	42	29	44
2	Albany Capitals	20	13	1	1	5	35	22	42
3	Penn-Jersey Spirit	20	12	1	1	6	34	23	39
4	Boston Bolts	20	8	1	2	9	27	27	28
5	Washington Stars	20	7	0	0	13	24	28	22
6	New Jersey Eagles	20	5	1	0	14	21	38	17

==== South Division ====
Place	Team	GP	W	SW	SL	L	GF	GA	Points
1	Fort Lauderdale Strikers	20	14	1	1	4	38	22	45
2	Tampa Bay Rowdies	20	9	1	0	10	32	39	29
3	Orlando Lions	20	8	0	0	12	25	30	24
4	Miami Freedom	20	7	1	1	11	27	29	24
5	Washington Diplomats	20	4	1	2	13	22	40	16

=== West (Western Soccer League) Conference ===
Points:

- Win: 6
- Shoot out win: 4
- Shoot out loss: 2
- 1 bonus point per goal scored in regulation, maximum of 3 per game

==== North Division ====
Place	Team	GP	W	SW	SL	L	GF	GA	Points
1	San Francisco Bay Blackhawks	20	9	4	1	6	39	30	104
2	Salt Lake Sting	20	11	1	1	7	39	34	104
3	Colorado Foxes	20	10	4	3	3	22	12	100
4	Portland Timbers	20	8	2	3	7	42	36	99
5	Seattle Storm	20	9	1	3	7	42	35	93

==== South Division ====
Place	Team	GP	W	SW	SL	L	GF	GA	Points
1	California Emperors	20	8	2	3	7	35	32	89
2	Real Santa Barbara	20	9	1	3	7	33	35	87
3	Los Angeles Heat	20	8	3	1	8	39	39	85
4	San Diego Nomads	20	5	3	3	9	22	28	67
5	New Mexico Chilies	20	5	2	1	12	25	45	61
6	Arizona Condors	20	5	0	1	14	29	51	59
