= 1991 American Professional Soccer League =

American Professional Soccer League
- Season: 1991
- Champions: San Francisco Bay Blackhawks (1st Title)
- Premiers: Maryland Bays (1st Title)
- 1992 CONCACAF Champions' Cup: San Francisco Bay Blackhawks
- Matches: 94
- Goals: 271 (2.88 per match)
- Best Player: (United States) Jean Harbor, Tampa Bay Rowdies
- Top goalscorer: (United States) Jean Harbor, Tampa Bay Rowdies (17 goals)
- Best goalkeeper: (United States) Mark Dougherty, San Francisco Bay Blackhawks

The 1991 American Professional Soccer League season was the 2nd season of the American Professional Soccer League. Only 9 out of 22 teams that competed in 1990 returned for a second season.

== Regular season ==
The point system used by the Western Conference (and previously the Western Soccer Alliance) was adopted league-wide this season:

- Win: 6 points
- Shoot out win: 4 points
- Shoot out loss: 2 points
- 1 bonus point per goal scored in regulation, maximum of 3 per game

=== American Conference ===
Place	Team	GP	W	L	WN	WE	WS	LN	LE	LS	GF	GA	GD	Pts
1	Fort Lauderdale Strikers	21	15	6	11	0	4	3	1	2	39	21	+18	117
2	Albany Capitals	21	10	11	9	1	0	7	1	3	27	29	−2	92
3	Tampa Bay Rowdies	21	8	13	7	1	0	13	0	0	26	27	−1	69
4	Penn-Jersey Spirit	21	6	15	4	0	2	13	0	2	25	50	−25	61
5	Miami Freedom	21	6	15	5	0	1	14	1	0	19	53	−34	52

=== Western Conference ===
Place	Team	GP	W	L	WN	WE	WS	LN	LE	LS	GF	GA	GD	Pts
1	Maryland Bays	21	19	2	17	1	1	2	0	0	54	23	+31	158
2	San Francisco Bay Blackhawks	21	17	4	12	1	4	2	1	1	33	16	+17	126
3	Colorado Foxes	21	13	8	11	1	1	7	0	1	36	27	+9	111
4	Salt Lake Sting	20	3	17	3	0	0	14	1	2	12	22	−10	33

== Playoffs ==
=== Bracket ===
Semifinals; Best-of-3
1	Maryland Bays	2	1	0(4)
4	Albany Capitals	1	2	0(5)
2	Fort Lauderdale Strikers	0	0	-
3	San Francisco Bay Blackhawks	1	1	-

1991 APSL Championship; Best-of-3
4	Albany Capitals	3	0	0(3)
3	San Francisco Bay Blackhawks	1	2	0(4)

=== Semifinal 1 ===
September 6, 1991
7:35 PM EST

Albany Capitals (NY)	2–1 (OT)	Maryland Bays (MD)
Dave Smyth 2'; Lee Tschantret 101'	Report	77' Kevin Sloan

Bleecker Stadium, Albany, New York
Attendance: 1,809

September 14, 1991

Maryland Bays (MD)	2–1	Albany Capitals (NY)
Philip Gyau 20' (Jackson); Kevin Sloan 69', (yellow card)	Report	89' Chris Szanto

Cedar Lane Park, Maryland
Attendance: 2,741

September 14, 1991

Maryland Bays (MD)	0–0	Albany Capitals (NY)
	Report
Penalties
Jean Harbor (penalty scored); Brian Haynes (penalty scored); Omid Namazi (penalty scored); John Abe (penalty missed); Scott Cook (penalty scored)	4–5	(penalty scored) John Garvey; (penalty scored) Scott Cannon; (penalty scored) Zoran Savic; (penalty scored) Mike Masters; (penalty scored) Lee Tschantret

Cedar Lane Park, Maryland
Attendance: 2,741
Referee: (USA)

The Albany Capitals advanced to the final.

=== Semifinal 2 ===
September 8, 1991
10:30 PM EST

San Francisco Bay Blackhawks (CA)	1–0 (OT)	Fort Lauderdale Strikers (FL)
Eric Wynalda (yellow card) 89:59'; Dominic Kinnear 96:33' (Qin, Salazar)	Report	Adrian Gaiten (yellow card) 79:31'

Spartan Stadium, San Jose, California
Attendance: 6,041
Referee: Brian Hall
September 14, 1991
7:30 PM EST

Fort Lauderdale Strikers (FL)	0–1 (OT)	San Francisco Bay Blackhawks (CA)
John Clare (yellow card) 24:25'	Report	Lawrence Lozzano (yellow card) 83:00'; Eric Wynalda 95:56' (Isaacs)

Lockhart Stadium, Fort Lauderdale, Florida
Attendance: 2,476
Referee: Raul Dominguez

The San Francisco Bay Blackhawks advanced to the final.

=== Final ===
September 22, 1991
3:50 PM EST

Albany Capitals (NY)	3–1	San Francisco Bay Blackhawks (CA)
Mark Dougherty 4:36' (o.g.); Ramiro Borja 34:13' (Savic, Mariner); Mike Masters 63:57' (Cannon); Paul Mariner (yellow card) 72'; Lee Tschantret (yellow card)	Report 1 Report 2	Derek Van Rheenen 36:13' (Wynalda)

Bleecker Stadium, Albany, New York
Attendance: 4,061

September 28, 1991
7:35 PM PST

San Francisco Bay Blackhawks (CA)	2–0	Albany Capitals (NY)
Townsend Qin 15'; Marcelo Balboa 75'	Report

Spartan Stadium, San Jose, California
Attendance: 12,411

September 28, 1991

San Francisco Bay Blackhawks (CA)	0–0	Albany Capitals (NY)
	Report 1 Report 2
Penalties
Dominic Kinnear (penalty scored); Townsend Qin (penalty scored); Jorge Salazar (penalty scored); Peter Isaacs (penalty missed); Chance Fry (penalty scored)	4–3	(penalty scored) ? (penalty missed) Todd Jackson; (penalty scored) ? (penalty scored) Mike Masters; (penalty missed) Jimmy McGeough, Jr.

Spartan Stadium, San Jose, California
Attendance: 12,411
Referee: (USA)

The San Francisco Bay Blackhawks win the APSL Championship.

== Points leaders ==
Rank	Scorer	Club	Goals	Assists	Points
1	(United States) Jean Harbor	Maryland Bays	17	11	45
2	(United States) Kevin Sloan	Maryland Bays	14	4	32
3	(Liberia) Zico Doe	Colorado Foxes	12	2	26
4	(United States) Derek Sanderson	Fort Lauderdale Strikers	10	3	23
4	(Trinidad and Tobago) Bryan Haynes	Maryland Bays	9	5	23
6	(Scotland) Andrew McKay	Fort Lauderdale Strikers	6	8	20
7	(England) Paul Dougherty	Fort Lauderdale Strikers	7	5	19
7	(United States) Mike Masters	Albany Capitals	7	5	19
9	(China) Townsend Qin	San Francisco Bay Blackhawks	6	6	18
10	(Puerto Rico) Ramiro Borja	Albany Capitals	7	3	17
11	(United States) Scott Benedetti	Colorado Foxes	5	6	16
12	(United States) Chance Fry	San Francisco Bay Blackhawks	6	2	14
13	(Vietnam) Dzung Tran	San Francisco Bay Blackhawks	5	3	13
13	(United States) Chad Ashton	Colorado Foxes	3	7	13
15	(United States) Philip Gyau	Maryland Bays	3	6	12
16	(United States) Ken Snow	Miami Freedom	5	1	11

== Honors ==
- MVP: (United States) Jean Harbor
- Leading goal scorer: (United States) Jean Harbor
- Leading goalkeeper: (United States) Mark Dougherty
- Rookie of the Year: (Liberia) Zico Doe
- Coach of the Year: (United States) Gary Hindley
- First Team All League
  - Goalkeeper: (United States) Mark Dougherty
  - Defenders: (United States) Marcelo Balboa, (United States) Troy Dayak, (United States) Danny Pena, (Nigeria) Derek Van Rheenen
  - Midfielders: (China) Townsend Qin, (Puerto Rico) Ramiro Borja, (United States) Kevin Sloan
  - Forwards: (Liberia) Zico Doe, (United States) Jean Harbor, (United States) Derek Sanderson
- Second Team All League
  - Goalkeeper: (United States) Scoop Stanisic
  - Defenders: (United States) Robin Fraser, (England) Paul Mariner, (Northern Ireland) Jimmy McGeough, Jr., (United States) Chris Reif
  - Midfielders: (Argentina) Marcelo Carrera, (England) Paul Dougherty, (United States) Dominic Kinnear
  - Forwards: (United States) Chance Fry, (Trinidad and Tobago) Bryan Haynes, (United States) Mike Masters
- Honorable Mention All League
  - Goalkeeper: (United States) Arnie Mausser
  - Defenders: (United States) Steve Pittman, (United States) Jeff Agoos, (United States) George Gelnovatch, (United States) Steve Eise
  - Midfielders: (United States) John Garvey, (United States) Jeff Baicher, (United States) Chad Ashton
  - Forwards: (United States) Ken Snow, (United States) Scott Benedetti, (United States) Eric Wynalda
