= Eise =

Eise may refer to:

== People with the given name ==
- Eise Eisinga (1744–1828), Frisian amateur astronomer

== People with the surname ==
- David Eise (born 1965), retired American soccer defender
- Ida Eise (1891–1978), New Zealand artist and art teacher
- Steve Eise, retired American soccer player
