= Caya (disambiguation) =

Caya may refer to:

- Caya, the Spanish name of Sideroxylon foetidissimum, a species of tree
- Río Caya, the Spanish name of the river Caia, in Spain and Portugal
- Caya diaphragm, or Caya, a silicone diaphragm model
- Dale Caya, an American soccer goalkeeper, who was the 1990 American Professional Soccer League Goalkeeper of the Year.

== See also ==
- La Caya, a town in the Valverde province of the Cibao region of the Dominican Republic.
