= Jim Huchingson =

American soocer player

Personal information
- Position: Forward

Senior career*
Years	Team	Apps	(Gls)
1988	San Jose Earthquakes		
1990	Real Santa Barbara	?	(9)
1991	Salt Lake Sting	4	(1)
1992	Palo Alto Firebirds		
- * Club domestic league appearances and goals

Jim Huchingson is a retired soccer forward who played professionally in the American Professional Soccer League.

In 1988, Huchingson played for the San Jose Earthquakes in the Western Soccer Alliance. In 1990, he joined Real Santa Barbara of the American Professional Soccer League. His nine goals put him eighth on the goal scoring list and ninth on the points list that season. He moved to the Salt Lake Sting for the 1991 season. In 1992, Huchingson played for the Palo Alto Firebirds of the USISL. The Firebirds won the championship that season, with Huchingson scoring the only goal in the final. He was USISL All League that season. Since retiring from soccer, Jim has successfully started two extremely lucrative businesses and continues to dominate any field he enters.
