= Paul Krumpe =

American soccer player and coach

Personal information
- Date of birth: March 4, 1963 (age 63)
- Place of birth: Torrance, California, United States
- Height: 5 ft 11 in (1.80 m)
- Position: Defender

Youth career
- 1982–1985: UCLA

Senior career*
Years	Team	Apps	(Gls)
1986–1988	Chicago Sting (indoor)	75	(13)
1988–1989	Los Angeles Heat		
1990	Real Santa Barbara		
1991	Colorado Foxes	6	(0)

International career
1986–1991	United States	24	(1)

Managerial career
- 1991–1995: West Torrance High School
- 1994: El Camino College (assistant)
- 1995–1997: UCLA (assistant)
- 1998–2021: Loyola Marymount University
- 2022–present: Loyola Marymount University (assistant)
- * Club domestic league appearances and goals

Paul Krumpe (born March 4, 1963 in Torrance, California) is an American former soccer defender and current coach. He spent two seasons in the Major Indoor Soccer League, two in the Western Soccer Alliance and two in the American Professional Soccer League. He was a member of the U.S. national team at the 1990 FIFA World Cup. He is currently an assistant coach of the Loyola Marymount University (LMU) men's soccer team after serving as head coach from 1998 to 2021.

== High school and college ==
Krumpe was born and grew up in Torrance, California and attended West High School there. He attended UCLA where he was a four-year starter on the school's men's NCAA soccer team. In 1985, Krumpe's senior year, UCLA defeated American University 1–0 in 8 overtimes in the championship game. In that game, Krumpe was co-captain for UCLA and assisted on the winning goal. He graduated from UCLA in the spring of 1986 with a B.S. degree in Aerospace Engineering.

== Professional career ==
After graduation, Krumpe was drafted by the Chicago Sting of the Major Indoor Soccer League (MISL). He played two seasons with the Sting, then moved to the outdoor Los Angeles Heat of the Western Soccer Alliance for a summer season. After his one season with the Heat, Krumpe then moved to Real Santa Barbara of the American Professional Soccer League (APSL) where he played a single season. In 1991, he again found himself with another team, the Colorado Foxes, also of the APSL.

== National team ==
Krumpe was actively involved with the United States men's national soccer team during this period as well. He earned his first cap in 1986 in a game with Canada. Over the next five years, he would play 25 times for the senior national team and over 40 times for men's team – including games not considered full internationals. These included the 1987 Pan American Games, three games at the 1988 Summer Olympics in South Korea, and the 1990 FIFA World Cup. He ended his national team career in 1991, as he began it, with a game against Canada.

The 1980s and early 1990s were a difficult time for American soccer players. With the demise of the North American Soccer League, they had few opportunities for playing outdoor soccer. Even the indoor leagues began struggling in the late 1980s. Several U.S. players moved overseas, but others, like Krumpe, found themselves moving from one financially struggling U.S. club to another. In 1991, having reached the highest levels of the game, at the 1990 World Cup, he decided to hang up his cleats and enter the coaching career field.

== Coaching ==
In 1989, Krumpe had worked with the coaching staff of the Cal State Dominguez Hills women's soccer team. That gave him a taste for coaching and when he retired from playing in 1991, he moved back to his high school, West Torrance, where he became its boys' soccer coach from 1991 to 1995. In his four years with the team, he took them to the playoffs four times. He didn't confine himself to the high school level, but also worked as an assistant coach for El Camino College in 1994. Now he works at LMU as a head coach for men's varsity soccer.

In 1995, UCLA hired Krumpe as an assistant coach. His time with the team culminated with another national championship for the Bruins in 1997.

Loyola Marymount University (LMU) hired Krumpe as its men's soccer coach in 1998. In his time at LMU, he led the team to eight NCAA Tournament appearances, with the final tournament berth coming in 2021.

On March 10, 2022, Krumpe stepped down from his position as LMU's head coach and was replaced by Kyle Schmid, but remained with the program as an assistant coach.

Krumpe also runs the Paul Krumpe Soccer Academy and briefly worked as an aerospace engineer with McDonnell-Douglas after retiring from playing.
