= Adrian Webster =

Adrian Webster may refer to:

- Adrian Webster (footballer, born 1980), New Zealand international football (soccer) player
- Adrian Webster (footballer, born 1951) (1951–2023), English football (soccer) player
