= North American Club Championship =

The North American Club Championship refers to two soccer tournaments:

- 1990 North American Club Championship (2 teams)
- Professional Cup (8 teams)
