= Ramiro Borja =

Ecuadorean-American soccer player (born 1961)

Personal information
- Full name: Ramiro A. Borja M.
- Date of birth: August 28, 1961 (age 65)
- Place of birth: Quito, Ecuador
- Positions: Forward; midfielder

Youth career
- 1979–1980: Rutgers

Senior career*
Years	Team	Apps	(Gls)
1986–1987	Memphis Storm (indoor)		
1987–1988	Los Angeles Lazers	11	(1)
1988–1989	Memphis Storm (indoor)		
1989–1991	Albany Capitals		

International career
1992	Puerto Rico		
- * Club domestic league appearances and goals

Ramiro Borja is a retired Ecuadorean-American soccer player. He played professionally in the Major Indoor Soccer League, American Indoor Soccer Association and American Professional Soccer League.

Borja, brother of Chico Borja, was raised in Belleville, New Jersey, and played prep soccer at Belleville High School. He attended Rutgers University, playing for the Rutgers Scarlet Knights men's soccer team in 1979 and 1980. In 1986, Borja signed with the Memphis Storm of the American Indoor Soccer Association. In 1987, he moved to the Los Angeles Lazers of the Major Indoor Soccer League, but was back with the Storm a year later. In 1989, he moved outdoors with the Albany Capitals of the American Soccer League. He played three seasons with the Capitals, the last two in the American Professional Soccer League. He was 1991 First Team All League.

== International ==
Borja competed for the Puerto Rico national football team during Puerto Rico's qualification games for the 1994 FIFA World Cup.
