= George Gelnovatch =

American soccer player and coach (born 1965)

Personal information
- Date of birth: February 12, 1965 (age 61)
- Place of birth: Wall Township, New Jersey, United States
- Height: 6 ft 2 in (1.88 m)
- Position: Defender

Youth career
- 1983–1986: Virginia Cavaliers

Senior career*
Years	Team	Apps	(Gls)
1987–1988	Minnesota Strikers (indoor)	15	(1)
1988	New Jersey Eagles		
1990	Penn-Jersey Spirit		
1991	Maryland Bays	18	(0)
1996	D.C. United	2	(0)

Managerial career
- 1989–1995: University of Virginia (assistant)
- 1996–: University of Virginia
- 1999: United States U18
- 1999, 2002: United States (assistant)
- * Club domestic league appearances and goals

George Gelnovatch (born February 12, 1965) is the men's soccer coach at the University of Virginia. He played professionally in the Major Indoor Soccer League and American Professional Soccer League. As head coach, he has led Virginia men's soccer to the College Cup Final Four in 1997, 2006, 2009, 2013, 2014, and 2019. Under his leadership, Virginia won its sixth and seventh NCAA National Championships of the sport in 2009 and 2014.

== Player ==
Gelnovatch grew up in Wall Township, New Jersey and played soccer at Wall High School, where he was part of three state champion teams. He attended the University of Virginia, playing on the men's soccer team from 1983 to 1986. He was a 1986 First Team All American. He ranks fifth on the school's all time lists for points (118) and goals (49). During his career, the Cavaliers went 67–14–4. In 1986, he earned first team all-ACC and first team all-American honors. In 1987, the Minnesota Strikers selected Gelnovatch in the fourth round of the Major Indoor Soccer League draft. He spent one season with Minnesota. In 1988, he moved to the New Jersey Eagles of the American Soccer League. In 1990, Gelnovatch joined the Penn-Jersey Spirit of the American Professional Soccer League. He was a first team All League defender that season. In April 1991, Gelnovatch moved to the Maryland Bays. In 1996, he played a handful of games for D.C. United in Major League Soccer.

== Coach ==
In 1989, Gelnovatch served as a part-time assistant coach under Bruce Arena with the Virginia Cavaliers. In 1995, he became a full-time assistant at Virginia. On January 3, 1996, Gelnovatch replaced Arena as head coach. He is most notable for leading the Cavaliers to the 2009 NCAA Division I Men's Soccer Championship where the Cavaliers won a penalty shoot-out against Akron. His teams have reached the NCAA tournament every year he's coached, except 2021. He has led the Cavaliers to three NCAA college cup appearances, four Atlantic Coast Conference tournament titles, and two Atlantic Coast Conference regular season titles. In September 1999, Arena appointed Gelnovatch as the head coach of the United States U-18 men's national soccer team. In 1999 and 2002, he also served as an assistant coach with the United States men's national soccer team.

== Head coaching record ==
Season	College	Won	Lost	Tied	Notes
1996	Virginia	16	3	3	ACC Tournament Runner-Up NCAA 1st Round
1997	Virginia	19	4	3	ACC Tournament Champions;NCAA Runner Up
1998	Virginia	16	4	3	NCAA Elite Eight
1999	Virginia	14	9	1	ACC Tournament Runner-Up NCAA Elite Eight
2000	Virginia	17	6	1	ACC Tournament Runner-Up NCAA Elite Eight
2001	Virginia	17	2	1	ACC Tournament Runner-Up NCAA Second Round
2002	Virginia	15	7	0	ACC Tournament Runner-Up NCAA Second Round
2003	Virginia	11	10	2	ACC Tournament Champions; NCAA Sweet Sixteen
2004	Virginia	18	5	1	ACC Tournament Champions; NCAA Elite Eight
2005	Virginia	12	5	3	NCAA Sweet Sixteen
2006	Virginia	17	4	1	NCAA Final Four
2007	Virginia	12	8	2	NCAA Second Round
2008	Virginia	11	9	1	ACC Tournament Runner-Up NCAA Second Round
2009	Virginia	19	3	3	ACC Tournament Champions NCAA Champions
2010	Virginia	11	6	3	NCAA First Round
2011	Virginia	12	8	1	NCAA First Round
2012	Virginia	10	7	4	NCAA Second Round
2013	Virginia	13	6	5	ACC Tournament Runner-Up NCAA Final Four
2014	Virginia	14	6	3	NCAA Champions
2015	Virginia	10	5	3	NCAA Second Round
2016	Virginia	10	3	5	NCAA Third Round
2017	Virginia	13	4	5	NCAA Second Round
2018	Virginia	10	4	3	NCAA Third Round
2019	Virginia	21	2	1	ACC Tournament Champions NCAA Runner-Up
2020	Virginia	7	8	1	ACC Tournament Semifinals
2021	Virginia	6	9	3	ACC Tournament First Round
2022	Virginia	10	4	5	ACC Tournament Semifinals NCAA Tournament Second Round
2023	Virginia	11	4	4	ACC Tournament Quarterfinals NCAA Tournament Third Round
2024	Virginia	11	7	3	ACC Tournament Semifinals NCAA Tournament Third Round
Overall		377	154	71	27 NCAA Appearances
