= Chris Reif =

American soccer player

Personal information
- Full name: Christopher M. Reif
- Place of birth: United States
- Positions: Defender; midfielder

Youth career
- 1984–1987: Connecticut Huskies

Senior career*
Years	Team	Apps	(Gls)
1988–1991	Maryland Bays		
1991	Baltimore Blast (indoor)	5	(2)
- * Club domestic league appearances and goals

Chris Reif is an American retired soccer who played professionally in the Major Indoor Soccer League and American Professional Soccer League.

Reif graduated from Calvert Hall High School. He attended the University of Connecticut, playing on the men's soccer team from 1984 to 1987. He was team captain his senior season as he earned Third Team All American honors. In 1988, the Cleveland Force selected Reif in the fourth round of the Major Indoor Soccer League draft but folded a few weeks later. Reif turned professional in 1988 with the Maryland Bays of the American Soccer League. He played with the Bays through the 1991 season. He was a 1990 and 1991 American Professional Soccer League Second Team All League defender. In May 1991, the Baltimore Blast signed Reif to a fifteen-day contract.
