= Sharif Omar Hashisho =

Sharif Omar Hashisho is a Qatari event producer and former professional football player.

== Early life and career ==
Sharif Hashisho was born in Doha, Qatar. He attended Tarek Bin Ziad school and graduated from Chapman University in 1988. In 1982, Sharif joined the junior football team at Al Sadd Sporting Club in Qatar and was named Top Goal Scorer in under 17 Qatar League. In 1985, He assumed the role of captain for the "American River College" football team. Hashisho played professionally for both the Sacramento Senators and L.A. Heat. In 1992, Hashisho founded Qvision Productions, an event managing company and managed official opening ceremonies for sports and international events, including Doha 2003, Doha 2006, Doha 2011, the AFC Asian Cup, FIFA World Cup Qatar 2022, FIFA Arab Cup, FIFA World Cup Qatar 2022, and the AFC Asian Cup Qatar 2023.
