= César Plasencia =

American soccer player and coach

Personal information
- Full name: César Plasencia Rodriguez
- Place of birth: Sacramento, California, United States
- Positions: Midfielder; forward

Youth career
- 1981–1982: Cosumnes River College
- 1983–1984: Cal-State, Sacramento

Senior career*
Years	Team	Apps	(Gls)
1986–1988	Atlas		
1989	Sacramento Senators		
1990	Real Santa Barbara		
1991	Salt Lake Sting	9	(0)

Managerial career
- 1993–1996: Cosumnes River College (assistant)
- 1998–2004: Cal-State, Sacramento (assistant)
- 2004–: Cosumnes River College
- * Club domestic league appearances and goals

César Plasencia (born Sacramento, California is a former U.S. soccer midfielder who played professionally in both Mexico and the United States. He is the head coach of the Cosumnes River College women's soccer team.

== Youth and college ==
Plasencia grew up in Sacramento, California and attended Christian Brothers High School. Following graduation from high school, he attended Cosumnes River College where he played on the men's soccer team. After two years, he moved to California State University, Sacramento for a single season. In 1990, he completed his coursework and graduated with a bachelor's degree in communications. Plasencia played for a variety of local amateur teams including Jalisco and Sacramento United.

== Playing career ==
In 1986, he moved to Mexico where he signed with First Division club Atlas. In 1989, he returned to the U.S. to play for the expansion Sacramento Senators of the Western Soccer League. The Senators folded at the end of the 1989 season and the WSL merged with the east-coast based American Soccer League (ASL) to form the American Professional Soccer League (APSL). Plasencia moved to Real Santa Barbara for the 1990 APSL season, but Santa Barbara folded at the end of the season. Plasencia made one more move, to the Salt Lake Sting, but once again, his team folded at the end of the season and Plasencia retired from playing professionally.

== Coaching career ==
In 1993, Plasencia was hired as an assistant coach for the men's soccer team at Cosumnes River College. He spent three years at Cosumnes before moving to California State University, Sacramento where he was again an assistant coach with the men's soccer team. However, in 2004, Cosumnes River College hired Plasencia as the head coach for the women's soccer team.

In February 2004, California State University, Sacramento inducted Plasencia into the school's Athletic Honor Roll.
