= Brad Smith (soccer, born 1965) =

American soccer player (born 1965)

Personal information
- Date of birth: March 15, 1965 (age 61)
- Place of birth: Dallas, Texas, United States
- Height: 5 ft 9 in (1.75 m)
- Position: Forward

Youth career
- Culver City High School

Senior career*
Years	Team	Apps	(Gls)
- Rot-Weiss Essen
- BVL Remscheid
1990	Los Angeles Heat		
1990–1992	Wichita Wings (indoor)	83	(31)
1991	Salt Lake Sting	11	(1)
1991	Tampa Bay Rowdies	5	(0)
1992	London Lasers	16	(3)
1992–1994	Dayton Dynamo (indoor)	71	(73)
1993	Tampa Bay Rowdies	21	(6)
1994	Los Angeles Salsa	?	(1)
1994–1996	Baltimore Spirit (indoor)	65	(45)
1996–1997	Cincinnati Silverbacks (indoor)	68	(34)
1998–1999	San Diego Flash	31	(5)
1998–1999	Baltimore Blast (indoor)	22	(8)
1999–2000	Buffalo Blizzard (indoor)	32	(14)
- * Club domestic league appearances and goals

Brad Smith is a retired American soccer forward who played professionally in Germany and the United States, including the Major Indoor Soccer League, National Professional Soccer League and American Professional Soccer League. He never played for Rot-Weiss Essen nor BVL Remscheid. He played for Franz Sales Haus, Herne, Schoppingen, Marl, and Göttingen. The latter four being in the "Oberliga" (third division) at the time. He returned to the United States in June 1990.

== Youth ==
Smith graduated from Culver City High School where he was an outstanding soccer and football player. Playing as a tailback, Smith was the 1983 Los Angeles Times High School Player of the Year. He was heavily recruited by several collegiate football programs. However, he was also drafted by both the San Diego Sockers of the North American Soccer League and the Cleveland Force of the Major Indoor Soccer League. Smith chose to neither sign with an American team nor attend college, but moved to Germany where he pursued a professional soccer career.

== Professional ==
Smith spent six years in the German 2. Bundesliga and 3. Liga playing for Rot-Weiss Essen and BVL Remscheid. In 1989, he returned to the Los Angeles area. In 1990, Smith played for the Los Angeles Heat of the American Professional Soccer League (APSL). That fall, he signed as a free agent with the Wichita Wings of the Major Indoor Soccer League where he played for two seasons. During the summer of 1991, Smith returned to the outdoor game, playing for the Salt Lake Sting and the Tampa Bay Rowdies of the APSL. With the collapse of the MISL and the Wichita Wings in 1992, Smith moved to the Dayton Dynamo of the National Professional Soccer League. In 1993, he returned to the Rowdies for the 1993 APSL season. In 1994, he played for the Los Angeles Salsa, which finished runner up to the Colorado Foxes. On November 1, 1994, the Baltimore Spirit purchased Smith's contract from the Dayton Dynamo. In October 1996, the Spirit released Smith and he signed as a free agent with the Cincinnati Silverbacks. The Silverbacks folded at the end of the season. In 1998, Smith again played outdoors, this time with the San Diego Flash of the USISL A-League, returning to the Flash again in 1999. On August 13, 1998, the Baltimore Blast selected Smith in the NPSL dispersal draft. In November 1999, the Blast sent Smith to the Buffalo Blizzard in exchange for future considerations. He suffered from several injuries before being waived in November 2000. He retired and entered the financial career field.
