= Steve Eise =

American soccer player

Personal information
- Position: Defender

Youth career
- 1985–1988: St. Louis Billikens

Senior career*
Years	Team	Apps	(Gls)
1989–1990	St. Louis Storm (indoor)	0	(0)
1990–1993	Colorado Foxes		
1990–1991	Detroit Rockers (indoor)		
- * Club domestic league appearances and goals

Steve Eise is an American retired soccer player who played professionally in the American Professional Soccer League.

Eise, brother of David Eise, graduated from Rosary High School in St. Louis, Missouri. He attended St. Louis University, playing on the men's soccer team from 1985 to 1988. On July 9, 1989, the St. Louis Storm selected Eise in the second round of the Major Indoor Soccer League Amateur Draft. He never played a first team game with the Storm. He also played indoors with the Detroit Rockers during the 1990–91 National Professional Soccer League season. In 1990, Eise joined the Colorado Foxes of the American Professional Soccer League. He was a 1990 Second Team All Western Conference and a 1991 All League Honorable Mention defender.
