= Joe Flanagan (soccer) =

American soccer player and coach

Personal information
- Positions: Forward; midfielder

Youth career
- 1986–1989: Cal State Dominguez Hills

Senior career*
Years	Team	Apps	(Gls)
1987	Los Angeles Heat		
1990	Los Angeles Heat		
1992	Los Angeles United (indoor)		
1995	Los Angeles Salsa U-23		

Managerial career
- 1992–1993: Cal State Dominguez Hills (assistant)
- 1994–: Cal State Dominguez Hills (men)
- 2002–: Cal State Dominguez Hills (women)
- * Club domestic league appearances and goals

Joe Flanagan is an American soccer coach who heads the Cal State Dominguez Hills men's and women's team. He was the 2000 and 2008 NCAA Division II Coach of the Year. A retired American soccer player, Flanagan played professionally in the American Professional Soccer League and Continental Indoor Soccer League.

== Player ==
Flanagan graduated from West High School. He attended Cal State Dominguez Hills, playing on the men's soccer team from 1986 to 1989. He finished his career at Dominguez Hills as the school's all time goal scorer. In 1987, Flanagan spent the collegiate off-season as an amateur with the Los Angeles Heat of Western Soccer Alliance. In 1990, he turned professional with the Heat, now playing in the American Professional Soccer League. In 1992, he played for the Los Angeles United in the Continental Indoor Soccer League. In 1995, Flanagan played for the Los Angeles Salsa U-23 team. He was selected as the 1995 Western Division Rookie of the Year.

== Coach ==
In 1992, Flanagan became an assistant coach to Marine Cano with the Cal State Dominguez Hills men's soccer team. In 1994, he succeeded Cano as the head coach of the men's team. In 2002, he also became the head coach of the women's team. In 2000 and 2008, Flanagan took the men's team to the NCAA Division II Men's Soccer Championship. He was also named the 2000 and 2008 NSCAA National Coach of the Year. In 2009, the women's team finished runner-up to the Grand Valley State Lakers in the NCAA Division II national championship.
