= Scott Cannon =

American soccer player (born 1968)

Personal information
- Date of birth: July 22, 1968 (age 58)
- Place of birth: Evansville, Indiana, United States
- Height: 5 ft 9 in (1.75 m)
- Positions: Defender; midfielder

Youth career
- 1986–1990: University of Evansville

Senior career*
Years	Team	Apps	(Gls)
1990–1991	Albany Capitals		
1991–1992	Harrisburg Heat (indoor)		
1994–1995	Detroit Rockers (indoor)	10	(0)
1995	Albany Alleycats		
1995–1996	Cincinnati Silverbacks (indoor)	29	(7)
1996	Colorado Rapids	21	(0)
1997	Richmond Kickers	23	(0)
1998	Columbus Crew	15	(0)
2000	Richmond Kickers	24	(0)
2001	Charleston Battery	5	(1)
2001	Tampa Bay Mutiny	9	(0)
- * Club domestic league appearances and goals

Scott Cannon (born July 22, 1968, in Evansville, Indiana) is an American former soccer player who played three seasons in Major League Soccer, two in the American Professional Soccer League, three in the National Professional Soccer League and at least four in the USISL and USL. He was the 1999 USL Defender of the Year and a two time USL All Star.

== High school and college ==
Cannon grew up in Evansville, Indiana, attending Reitz Memorial High School where he won 3 State Championships and was a 1985 and 1986 NSCAA High School All-American soccer player. He then went on to attend University of Evansville, playing on the men's soccer team from 1986 to 1990. In 1990, he anchored a defense with 20 shutouts and allowed only 5 goals in 25 games (NCAA records) during their undefeated season. Cannon was named a first team All-American and was inducted into the Evansville Athletic Hall of Fame in 2003

== Professional ==
In the spring of 1991, during his final semester of college, Cannon started his professional career with the Albany Capitals of the American Professional Soccer League (APSL). The Capitals made it to the finals of the APSL but lost in penalty kicks. In the summer of 1991, he also played for the U.S. at the World University Games. That fall, he signed with the Harrisburg Heat of the National Professional Soccer League (NPSL) for the 1991–1992 season, despite being selected first (third overall) by the Cleveland Crunch in the first round of the Major Indoor Soccer League (MISL) draft. He later signed with the Detroit Rockers at some point during the 1994-1995 NPSL season, playing only ten games with them. In the summer of 1995, Cannon spent one season with the expansion Albany Alleycats of USISL. That fall, he signed with the Cincinnati Silverbacks of NPSL.

In February 1996, the Colorado Rapids of Major League Soccer selected Cannon in the sixth round (52nd overall) of the Inaugural Player Draft. Cannon delayed reporting to the Rapids as the Silverbacks went to the NPSL championship series. When he arrived in the Colorado training camp, he reported injured with a bone spur in his ankle. Despite that, he played twenty-one games, starting sixteen, with the Rapids. The Rapids released Cannon at the end of the season and he played for the Richmond Kickers (USISL) in 1997. In March 1998, the Columbus Crew picked Cannon in the second round (21st overall) of the 1998 MLS Supplemental Draft. He spent the 1998 season in Columbus, where the team made it to the finals of the US Open Cup and the semi-finals of the MLS Cup. He was waived by the Crew on November 2, 1998. In May 2000, Cannon rejoined the Kickers for the 2000 USL season. He was the USL Defender of the Year and a first team All Star. In 2001, he moved to the Charleston Battery, playing five games before being called back to MLS by the Tampa Bay Mutiny on May 5. Two days later, the Mutiny signed Cannon for the remainder of the season. Cannon played nine games with the Mutiny. The Mutiny waived Cannon in November 2001. Even though he received several offers to continue playing, Cannon decided to retire from professional soccer.

== Coaching ==
Since retiring from playing, Cannon has served in a variety of youth soccer positions. He is currently the Director of Soccer for Rhode Island Surf Soccer Club.
