= Mike Mikes =

American soccer player and coach

Personal information
- Full name: Michael Mikes
- Place of birth: United States
- Position: Midfielder

Youth career
- 1983–1986: Evansville Purple Aces

Senior career*
Years	Team	Apps	(Gls)
1990–1995	Colorado Foxes		
1992–1993	Wichita Wings (indoor)	4	(0)

Managerial career
- 1991: Regis University (assistant)
- * Club domestic league appearances and goals

Michael Mikes is an American retired soccer player who spent most of his career with the Colorado Foxes in the American Professional Soccer League.

== Player ==
Mikes played for Scott Galagher in St. Louis as a child and graduated from St. John Vianney High School. He attended the University of Evansville, playing on the men's soccer team from 1983 to 1986. He was a 1985 Third Team and 1986 Second Team All American. In 2006, the University of Evansville inducted Mikes into the school's Hall of Fame. in 1990, Mikes joined the Colorado Foxes of the American Professional Soccer League, playing for them through at least 1995. He also played four games for the Wichita Wings during the 1992-1993 National Professional Soccer League season.

== Coach ==
In September 1991, Mikes became an assistant coach at Regis University.
