= Joe Barger =

American soccer and lacrosse player

Personal information
- Full name: T. Joseph Barger
- Place of birth: Fallston, Maryland, U.S.
- Height: 5 ft 11 in (1.80 m)
- Positions: Defender; midfielder

Youth career
- 1985–1988: Loyola Greyhounds

Senior career*
Years	Team	Apps	(Gls)
1989–1991	Baltimore Blast (indoor)	78	(5)
1990–1991	Maryland Bays		
1993	Baltimore Bays		
1993–1996	Baltimore Bays (indoor)		
1998–1999	Baltimore Blast (indoor)	4	(0)
- * Club domestic league appearances and goals

T. Joseph Barger is an American retired soccer and lacrosse player who played professionally in the American Professional Soccer League, Major Indoor Soccer League, and USISL.

In 1985, Barger graduated from Fallston High School. He attended Loyola University Maryland, playing on the men's soccer team from 1985 to 1988 and the men's lacrosse team his senior year. He graduated in 1989 with a bachelor's degree in finance.

In 1989, the Baltimore Blast selected Barger in the MISL Draft. He would spend two indoor seasons with the Blast. In 1990, he signed with the Maryland Bays of the American Professional Soccer League where he played two summer, outdoor seasons. In 1990, Barger and his team mates won the APSL championship. In September 1991, Barger retired to pursue a career in the financial industry. However, he returned in 1993, to play for the Baltimore Bays of the USISL. He went on to play at least one outdoor and three indoor seasons with the Bays. On January 7, 1999, the Blast signed Barger to a fifteen-day contract to cover for several injured players. He saw time in four games before being released.

In 2007, the Maryland Soccer Hall of Fame inducted Barger.
