= Dan Donigan =

American soccer player (born 1966)

Personal information
- Full name: Daniel Donigan
- Date of birth: August 3, 1966 (age 60)
- Place of birth: Trenton, New Jersey, United States
- Height: 6 ft 0 in (1.83 m)
- Position: Forward

College career
Years	Team	Apps	(Gls)
1985–1988	Connecticut Huskies		

Senior career*
Years	Team	Apps	(Gls)
1989	Boston Bolts	?	(4)
1989–1991	St. Louis Storm (indoor)	78	(27)
1990–1991	Penn-Jersey Spirit	?	(6)
1991–1992	Wichita Wings (indoor)	39	(18)
1993	Tampa Bay Rowdies	22	(0)
1992–1994	Milwaukee Wave (indoor)	71	(86)
1994	Rockford Raptors		
1996	Washington Warthogs (indoor)	3	(0)
1997	Milwaukee Wave (indoor)	21	(14)
1997–1999	St. Louis Ambush indoor)	27	(9)
2000	St. Louis Steamers (indoor)	10	(7)

International career
1988	United States futsal	4	(0)
1990	United States	1	(0)

Managerial career
- 1994–1996: Connecticut Huskies (assistant)
- 1997–2001: Saint Louis Billikens (assistant)
- 2001–2009: Saint Louis Billikens
- 2010–2018: Rutgers Scarlet Knights
- * Club domestic league appearances and goals

Dan Donigan (born August 3, 1966) is a retired United States soccer forward and former coach who played professionally in the Major Indoor Soccer League, American Professional Soccer League and National Professional Soccer League. Following his playing career he coached at the collegiate level as an assistant coach for Connecticut and Saint Louis, and subsequently as a head coach for Saint Louis and Rutgers.

== Player ==
=== High school ===
Donigan was born in Trenton, New Jersey and grew up in Hamilton Township, New Jersey where he attended Steinert High School. Donigan scored 34 goals in his senior year, leading Steinert to the Group 3 state championship. In 1999, he was named by The Star-Ledger as one of the top ten New Jersey high school soccer players of the 1980s.

=== College ===
After graduating from high school in 1985, Donigan attended the University of Connecticut (UConn) where he played as a forward on the men's soccer team from 1985 to 1988. During his four season with the Huskies, he was three-time second and third team All-American. In 1988, he received the adidas Adi Dasslar Award as the nation's "Most Outstanding Senior Soccer Player" in 1988. Donigan finished his collegiate career with 35 goals and 40 assists for 110 points. While he left college without completing his degree, he later returned and earned a BS in Business Administration in 1998.

=== Professional ===
After finishing his collegiate career, Donigan embarked on a life as a soccer journeyman. Like many U.S. soccer players in the 1980s and early 1990s, his was an itinerant life, moving from one failing indoor and outdoor club to another. In April 1989, he signed with the Boston Bolts of the American Soccer League. He scored four goals, adding seven assists, as the Bolts went to the ASL championship game only to fall to the Fort Lauderdale Strikers. On July 8, 1989, the St. Louis Storm selected Donigan in the first round (second overall) of the Major Indoor Soccer League draft. He signed with the Storm in September 1989. In 1990 and 1991, Donigan played for the Penn-Jersey Spirit of the American Professional Soccer League, successor league to the ASL. He was a 1990 APSL First Team All Star. In 1991, he played in 11 games, but scored no goals. In July 1991, the St. Louis Storm traded Donigan to the Wichita Wings in exchange for Mark Santel. He played one season in Wichita. On October 17, 1992, he signed with the Milwaukee Wave of the National Professional Soccer League. He spent two seasons with the Wave. In 1993, he spent the outdoor season with the Tampa Bay Rowdies (APSL). In May 1994, the Washington Warthogs selected Donigan in the Continental Indoor Soccer League draft. The CISL played indoor soccer during the summer and Donigan chose to play for the Rockford Raptors of the USISL instead. That summer, he also signed a three-year contract with the Milwaukee Wave, then backed out of the contract to become an assistant coach at UConn. At the end of the 1996 collegiate season, UConn changed its head coaches and the new coach brought in an entirely new cadre of assistants. Therefore, Donigan decided to resume his playing career. On January 4, 1997, Donigan signed with the Milwaukee Wave for the remainder of the 1996–1997 NPSL season. At the time, he had just moved to St. Louis to become an assistant coach with the St. Louis University men's soccer team. He played XXX seasons with the Wave. Donigan was then hired as an assistant coach with the St. Louis University men's soccer team. As a result, he did not play the beginning of the 1997–1998 season. On January 28, 1998, the Wave traded Donigan to the St. Louis Ambush in exchange for cash, a second-round pick in the 1998 college draft and future considerations. Donigan played parts of two seasons for the Ambush. In May 2000, he signed with the St. Louis Steamers of the World Indoor Soccer League.

=== National team ===
On September 15, 1990, he earned his only cap with the U.S. national team in a 3–0 victory over Trinidad and Tobago. In 1988, Donigan earned four caps for the United States national futsal team.

== Coach ==
In 1994 July, Donigan began his coaching career as assistant men's soccer coach at UConn. He would go on to serve as an assistant for three seasons. The college released Donigan in December 1996 after bringing in a new head coach. On February 27, 1997, St Louis University hired Donigan as their assistant coach. On February 5, 2001, the university hired him as its fifth head soccer coach. Donigan won the title of Atlantic 10 Conference Coach of the Year in 2006 and 2007. Dan Donigan was named head coach for the Rutgers men's soccer program on January 22, 2010.

Donigan was fired by Rutgers following the 2018 NCAA Division I men's soccer season.
