= Sacramento Senators =

Sacramento Senators may refer to:

- Sacramento Senators (baseball)
- Sacramento Senators (soccer)
