= Dave MacWilliams =

American soccer player (born 1957)

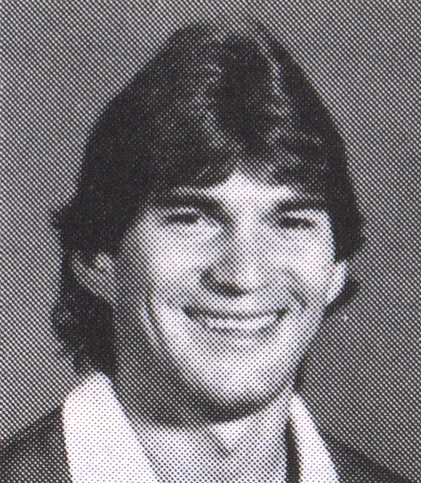
- MacWilliams circa 1984

Personal information
- Full name: David MacWilliams
- Date of birth: May 20, 1957 (age 69)
- Place of birth: Philadelphia, Pennsylvania, U.S.
- Position: Forward

College career
Years	Team	Apps	(Gls)
1975–1978	Philadelphia Rams		

Senior career*
Years	Team	Apps	(Gls)
1978–1979	Tampa Bay Rowdies (indoor)		
1979	Tampa Bay Rowdies	6	(1)
1979–1982	Philadelphia Fever (indoor)	106	(92)
1980	Philadelphia Fury	21	(4)
1982–1987	Baltimore Blast (indoor)	162	(115)
1987–1988	Chicago Sting (indoor)	34	(18)
- Philadelphia United German-Hungarians

Managerial career
- 1990–1991: Penn-Jersey Spirit
- 1994–1996: Baltimore Spirit
- 1996–1999: Philadelphia KiXX
- 2000–2017: Temple Owls
- * Club domestic league appearances and goals

Dave MacWilliams (last name also spelled McWilliams; born May 20, 1957) is an American retired soccer forward and head coach who played professionally in the North American Soccer League and Major Indoor Soccer League. He is also the former head coach of the Temple University men's soccer team.

== Player ==
=== Youth ===
MacWilliams was born in Philadelphia, Pennsylvania. In 1975, he graduated from Frankford High School where he had led the Pioneers to two Philadelphia Public League and City Championships. He then attended Philadelphia Textile, playing soccer there from 1975 to 1978. He was a 1978 second team All American and ranked fifth in career goals and first in career assists. He was inducted into the Philadelphia Textile, now known as Philadelphia University, Athletic Hall of Fame in 1985. He was also a member of the 1979 United States Pan-American Games team and 1980 Olympic team.

MacWilliams is one of 22 college players to be part of the 40–40 club, having both 40 goals and 40 assists in their college career.

=== Professional ===
In 1978, the Tampa Bay Rowdies of the North American Soccer League drafted MacWilliams. He played part of the 1978–1979 NASL indoor season with the Rowdies, then six games of the 1979 outdoor season. On November 6, 1979, the Rowdies sold his contract to the Philadelphia Fever of the Major Indoor Soccer League. In the summer of 1982, the Fever went into hiatus. When they did, they released MacWilliams who signed with the Baltimore Blast on August 11, 1982. MacWilliams had several excellent seasons with the Blast, but had knee surgery during the 1985–1986 season. His recovery lasted most of the 1986–1987 season during which he played only six games, scoring four goals. The Blast released him in July 1987. On January 14, 1988, MacWilliams signed with the Chicago Sting. The Sting experienced financial difficulties during the season and released MacWilliams and several others in June 1988 in a cost reduction move. With the Fever, "Mac Attack" was the league's 14th leading scorer in the 1979–80 season, 10th best in 1980–81, and 12th for 1981–82. With the Blast, MacWilliams was the 22nd best scoring in 1982–83 and 13th best for 1983–84. The Blast won the '83–'84 league championship with MacWilliams as captain. He holds the Blast record for play-off games (47) played and play-off points scored (73). He was inducted into the Baltimore Blast Hall of Fame in 2006.

== Coach ==
In April 1990, the expansion Penn-Jersey Spirit of the American Professional Soccer League hired MacWilliams as head coach. In August 1994, MacWilliams became head coach of the Baltimore Spirit of the National Professional Soccer League. After coaching for two and a half years and compiling a 37–30 record, MacWilliams resigned as head coach of the Spirit on January 29, 1996. On March 26, 1996, he was hired to coach the expansion Philadelphia KiXX. The KiXX fired him in March 1999. He had a 57–49 cumulative regular season record with the KiXX. In August 2000, Temple University hired MacWilliams to coach the school's men's soccer team. MacWilliams was fired as Temple's coach on November 15, 2017.

MacWilliams is currently the Director of Soccer of the Montgomery United S.C. youth soccer club and head coach of the elite U-17 team of the Eastern Pennsylvania Youth Soccer Association. He was inducted into the Philadelphia Soccer Hall of Fame in 1998.
