= Adrian Webster (footballer, born 1951) =

English footballer (1951–2023)

Personal information
- Date of birth: 6 November 1951
- Place of birth: Colchester, England
- Date of death: 8 November 2023 (aged 72)
- Positions: Defender; midfielder

Youth career
- 1963–1968: Colchester United

Senior career*
Years	Team	Apps	(Gls)
1968–1971	Colchester United		
1971–1972	Hillingdon Borough		
1972–1974	Vancouver Spartans		
1974–1979	Seattle Sounders	111	(3)
1979–1980	Pittsburgh Spirit (Indoor)	28	(3)
1980–1982	Phoenix Inferno (Indoor)	17	(0)

Managerial career
- 1981–1982: Phoenix Inferno
- 1989–1991: Arizona Condors
- 1991–1992: Brightlingsea United
- 1992–1993: Halstead Town
- * Club domestic league appearances and goals

Adrian Webster (6 November 1951 – 8 November 2023) was an English football player and coach who played in England, Canada and the United States.

== Playing career ==
Webster joined Colchester United F.C. as a fourteen-year-old schoolboy, where he also started his senior career, playing at Colchester for three years from 1968 to 1971. After leaving Colchester he went on to play for Hillingdon F.C.

When Bobby Cram moved to Canada in 1972 to become player-coach for the Vancouver Spartans, with him he took two Colchester United players, Adrian Webster and Neil Partner. Webster went on to play with the Spartans for two seasons in the BC Premier League. When the North American Soccer League awarded a franchise to the Seattle Sounders for the upcoming 1974 season, Seattle coach John Best spotted Webster playing in a Cup Final for the Spartans and signed him immediately.

Webster spent six seasons with the Sounders, starting off as a right-back. In 1977 now Head Coach Jimmy Gabriel moved Webster into central midfield and made him team captain. That season the Sounders went on to make the playoffs, losing in the final to a New York Cosmos side which included the legendary Pelé. Webster missed a considerable number of games in his last two seasons with the Seattle Sounders owing to injuries.

In 1979, he moved to Major Indoor Soccer League where he played with the Pittsburgh Spirit. The Spirit sat out the following season and Webster turned down an offer to join Cleveland Force in favour of a move to another new franchise the Phoenix Inferno.

== Coaching career ==
During his first season at Phoenix Inferno, Webster took over as head coach and led the Inferno into the playoffs. After a poor start to their second season, Webster was sacked. However, Webster stayed in Phoenix and managed an indoor soccer facility for five years. During that time he started a soccer programme at Scottsdale Community College.

In 1989 Adrian joined forces with local property developer Tony Koleski to form the Arizona Condors, playing in the South Division of the 1989 Western Soccer League. He was general manager and head coach for two seasons before the team folded. The Condors played one season in the WSL and their second season in the American Professional Soccer League (APSL).

In 1991 Webster returned to England and was soon given the manager's job at Brightlingsea Regent. During this period Webster started a Summer Soccer Camp for Colchester United. After one season with Brightlingsea, he then joined Halstead Town F.C. as Manager. In 1993 Webster was offered a full-time job in Youth Development at Colchester United where he spent 13 years working as the Soccer Centre Manager, Recruitment Officer, Youth Development Officer, Centre Of Excellence Manager and Coach of the U'16s side.

In 2006 Webster left Colchester to take up the role of assistant director of Football at the Colne Community School in Brightlingsea, Essex. While coaching at the Colne ex-Colchester United player Steve McGavin took him to Ipswich Town where he spent five years in the youth recruitment program. After ten years at the Colne he retired, and later on helped ex-Colne player Tom Austin as his number two for FC Clacton.

== Death ==
Webster died on 8 November 2023, at the age of 72.
