= Bobby Sibbald =

Footballer (born 1948)

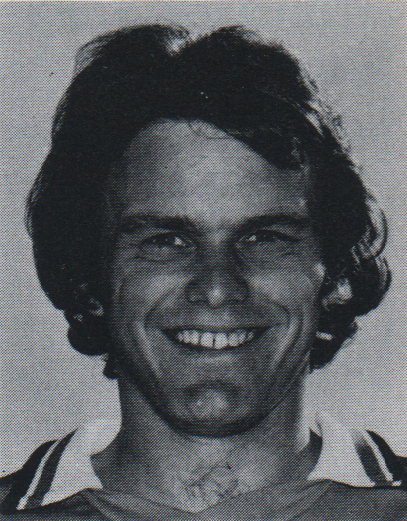
- Sibbald in 1979

Personal information
- Full name: Robert Louis Sibbald
- Date of birth: 25 January 1948 (age 78)
- Place of birth: Hebburn, England
- Height: 5 ft 7 in (1.70 m)
- Position: Defender

Youth career
- ?–1965: Leeds United

Senior career*
Years	Team	Apps	(Gls)
1965–1969	Leeds United	2	(0)
1969–1971	York City	79	(7)
1971–1975	Southport	170	(11)
1975	Los Angeles Aztecs	22	(3)
1975–1977	Southport	68	(2)
1977–1980	Los Angeles Aztecs	116	(4)

Managerial career
- 1989–1990: Los Angeles Heat
- * Club domestic league appearances and goals

Robert Louis Sibbald (born 25 January 1948) is an English former footballer and manager who played for Leeds United, York City and Southport in the Football League.

== Career ==
Born in Hebburn, County Durham, Sibbald progressed through the Leeds United youth system. He helped the youth team win the Jr European Cup before turning professional in January 1965. He was unable to affirm a regular place in the first team due to Paul Reaney being the first choice right back, and after making two league appearances, he joined York City in February 1969. He was captain for the 1969–70 season, but after losing his place in the team, joined Southport in July 1971 following an initial two-month trial. He made 45 appearances for Southport as they won the Fourth Division title in the 1972–73 season. He joined the Los Angeles Aztecs of the North American Soccer League in 1975, making 22 appearances and scoring three goals for them before rejoining Southport in the same year. After another two seasons at Southport, he rejoined the Aztecs in 1977 and made 116 appearances and scored four goals during his second spell with the team. He retired from playing in 1980 and became assistant coach at the Aztecs, before becoming head coach of the Los Angeles Heat.
