= Bobby Bruch =

American soccer player and coach (born 1966)

Personal information
- Date of birth: September 9, 1966 (age 60)
- Place of birth: United States
- Height: 5 ft 8 in (1.73 m)
- Positions: Midfielder; forward

Youth career
- 1982–1985: Seattle Pacific University

Senior career*
Years	Team	Apps	(Gls)
1986–1988	F.C. Seattle Storm		
1988–1989	Los Angeles Lazers (indoor)	16	(0)
1989	California Kickers		
1990	Los Angeles Heat		
1994–1995	Anaheim Splash (indoor)	7	(2)

Managerial career
- 1992–1995: Marina High School
- 2000–2002: Seattle Pacific University
- 2002: Seattle Sounders Women
- * Club domestic league appearances and goals

Bobby Bruch is an American retired soccer player who played professionally in the Western Soccer Alliance, Major Indoor Soccer League and American Professional Soccer League. He has coached at the youth, college and professional levels.

== Youth ==
Bruch graduated from Newport High School where he was a member of the 1982 Washington State High School soccer championship team. He attended Seattle Pacific University, playing on the men's soccer team from . In 1985 and 1986, the Falcons won the NCAA Men's Division II Soccer Championship. Bruch graduated with a bachelor's degree in business management.

== Professional ==
In 1986, Bruch signed with the F.C. Seattle Storm of the Western Soccer Alliance. He played three seasons with Seattle, winning the 1988 WSA championship. In the fall of 1988, he joined the Los Angeles Lazers for the 1988-1989 Major Indoor Soccer League season. In 1989, he played for the California Kickers of the WSA. In 1990, he moved to the Los Angeles Heat of the American Professional Soccer League. In 1994, Bruch joined the Anaheim Splash of the Continental Indoor Soccer League. His first game with the Splash came in the Western Conference final series where he scored the winning goal.

== Coach ==
In 1992, Bruch became the head coach of the Marina High School girls' soccer team, a position he held for four years. He left the team at the end of the 1995 season to coach the Mission Viejo Shamrocks, a girls' youth club. On October 17, 2000, Seattle Pacific University hired Bruch as the school's first women's soccer coach. He was the 2002 Great Northwest Athletic Conference Coach of the Year. In 2002, he resigned at the end of the season having compiled a two-season record of 21–14–3. In January 2002, he was also hired to coach the Seattle Sounders Women of the W-League.
