= Brian Ainscough =

Soccer coach

Personal information
- Date of birth: October 1964 (age 61–62)
- Place of birth: Dublin, Ireland
- Position: Midfielder

College career
Years	Team	Apps	(Gls)
1984	Fairleigh Dickinson Knights		

Senior career*
Years	Team	Apps	(Gls)
1988–1989	New Jersey Eagles		(1)
1990	Penn-Jersey Spirit		
1992–1993	Drogheda United	6	(0)

Managerial career
- 1991: Villanova Wildcats (assistant)
- 1992–1994: Boston College Eagles (assistant)
- 1995–1999: Providence Friars
- 2000–2004: Bowdoin Polar Bears
- 2005–2015: Northeastern Huskies
- * Club domestic league appearances and goals

Brian Ainscough is an Irish football club owner and former player and coach. He was the owner of Dundalk and CEO of United Soccer League Two club Boston Bolts (USL). He was previously owner of Kerry F.C., where under his tenure, the club won just one game.

Formerly a coach, who last coached the men's soccer team at Northeastern University from 2005 to 2014, he compiled a 79–80–33 overall record, including a 27–16–12 mark in conference play. He has posted a lower win percentage than his predecessor Ed Manz, posting only four straight top 5 finishes in conference play despite his long tenure. His best success came in 2009, when the team went 10–8–1, including an 8–3–1 mark in conference play. He has led the team to back-to-back finals appearances in the CAA tournament, narrowly missing the NCAA tournament both years, failing to build upon Manz's two Conference Regular Season championships.

He was previously the head men's soccer coach at Providence College, where he coached the Friars for four years and guided them to a 9–9–1 record his final year. In 1998, his Friars made the Big East tournament for the first time in over a decade. He started his coaching career as an assistant at Villanova University in 1991. From 1992 to 1994, he coached under Ed Kelly at Boston College.
