= Alvin James =

Jamaican-American soccer player

Personal information
- Date of birth: April 6, 1967 (age 59)
- Place of birth: Mandeville, Jamaica
- Height: 5 ft 9 in (1.75 m)
- Positions: Midfielder; forward

College career
Years	Team	Apps	(Gls)
1985–1986	UNC Greensboro Spartans		
1987–1988	FIU Golden Panthers		

Senior career*
Years	Team	Apps	(Gls)
1989–1994	Fort Lauderdale Strikers	63	(14)
1991–1992	Illinois Thunder (indoor)	23	(3)
1997	Florida Strikers	0	(0)

Managerial career
- 1999–2011: Weston Soccer Club
- American Heritage (Delray)
- 2011–2013: West Pines United
- 2013–: Miramar United Elite FC
Medal record
Men's soccer
Representing United States
Youth Championships
Winner	Florida State Championship	1984
Winner	Florida State Championship	1985
NCAA Division III Championship
Winner	UNC Greensboro	1985
Winner	UNC Greensboro	1986
American Soccer League
Winner	Fort Lauderdale Strikers	1989
National Championship
Winner	Fort Lauderdale Strikers	1989
- * Club domestic league appearances and goals

Alvin James (born April 6, 1967) is a retired Jamaican-American soccer midfielder / forward who played professionally in the American Soccer League, American Professional Soccer League, and National Professional Soccer League. He has coached youth soccer in South Florida for many years.

== Youth career ==
James was born in Mandeville, Jamaica, James moved to South Florida with his family as a young boy. He grew up playing soccer with the U-19 Lauderhill Lions FC winning 2 State Championships in 1984 and 1985.

In 1985, James graduated from Boyd Anderson High School.

== College career ==
James attended UNC-Greensboro, playing on the Spartans 1985 and 1986 NCAA Men's Division III Soccer National Championship Team. in 1985 the team went 20-5-0 overall record and 7-0-0 in the Dixie Intercollegiate Athletic Conference. In 1986 the team went 18–5–0 and won the DIII championship back-to-back.

In 2014, James and the rest of the 1985 championship squad were collectively inducted into the UNCG Athletics Hall of Fame.

He transferred to Florida International University where he completed his collegiate career with the Golden Panthers (during their transition between Division II to Division I in 1987 and 1988 and graduated with a degree in economics. In 1988 he had among the most assist on the team.

== Professional career ==
In 1989, James turned professional when he signed with the Fort Lauderdale Strikers of the American Soccer League. That season, the Strikers won the league championship. James played for the Strikers in 1990 and 1991.

On October 31, 1991, James signed with the Illinois Thunder of the National Professional Soccer League, but tore the anterior cruciate ligament in his right knee in February 1992.

He had reconstructive surgery on May 19, 1992, and lost the entire 1992 outdoor season. He came back and played for the Strikers in 1993 when they were in the American Professional Soccer League. He recorded 14 goals and 15 assists in 63 games across his outdoor career with the Strikers.

In 1997, James had a brief stint with the Florida Strikers in the D3 Professional League, marking the final chapter of his professional playing career.

== Coaching career ==
James coached for the Weston Soccer Club from 1999 to 2011 winning 4 State Championships for the Club putting them on the map as a viable and competitive club Nationally. The club was then awarded Academy Status where he coached the 1993/1994 U-16 squad.

Many players under James garnered athletic scholarships most notable where Alejandro Bedoya, Scotty Campbell, and Jean Alexander. James then went on to coach American Heritage School (Delray Beach, Florida) winning another 3 State Championships.

He left Weston FC and coached at West Pines United for 2 years from 2011 to 2013 before starting and becoming the DOC of his own club, Miramar United Elite FC in Miramar Florida in 2013.

== Statistics ==
=== Outdoor league statistics ===
Year	Lg	Team	GP	GS	Min	G	A	Pts	PKG	Shts
1989	ASL	Fort Lauderdale Strikers	8	4	511	0	0	0	0	0
1990	APSL	Fort Lauderdale Strikers	15	12	1136	5	2	0		0
1991	APSL	Fort Lauderdale Strikers	17	13	1308	2	2	0		0
1993	APSL	Fort Lauderdale Strikers	18	15	1270	7	3	0	1	0
1994	APSL	Fort Lauderdale Strikers	5	3	336	0	1	0	0	0
1997	D3 Pro League	Florida Strikers	0	0	0	0	0	0	0	0
Totals			63	47	4561	14	15	0	1	0

=== Postseason statistics ===
Year	Lg	Team	GP	GS	Min	G	A	Pts	PKG	Shts
1989	ASL	Fort Lauderdale Strikers	4	4	337	0	0	0	0	0
1990	APSL	Fort Lauderdale Strikers	3	2	225	1	2	0	0	0
1991	APSL	Fort Lauderdale Strikers	2	0	42	0	0	0	0	0
Totals			9	6	604	1	2	0	0	0

=== Indoor league statistics ===
Season	League	Team	GP	G	A	Pts	PIM	PPG	FCB	Shts	S%
1991–92	NPSL	Illinois Thunder	23	3	4	7	41	11	3	0	10.0%
totals			23	3	4	7	41	11	3	0	10.0%

== Honours ==
=== Player ===
Youth

- Lauderhill Lions FC
  - Florida State Championship: 1984, 1985

College

- UNC Greensboro Spartans
  - NCAA Division III National Championship: 1985, 1986
  - Dixie Intercollegiate Athletic Conference Regular Season Championship: 1985
  - All-Dixie Intercollegiate Athletic Conference Second Team: 1986

Club

- Fort Lauderdale Strikers
  - American Soccer League Championship: 1989

Individual & Inductions

- UNC Greensboro Spartans
  - UNCG Athletics Hall of Fame: 2014

=== Manager ===
- Weston Soccer Club
  - Florida State Championship (4x): 1999–2011
- American Heritage School (Delray Beach)
  - Florida High School Athletic Association (FHSAA) State Championship (3x)
