= Dale Caya =

American soccer player

Personal information
- Full name: Dale Edward Caya
- Place of birth: United States
- Position: Goalkeeper

Youth career
- 1982–1985: Temple Owls

Senior career*
Years	Team	Apps	(Gls)
1988	Philadelphia Inter		
1989–1991	Penn-Jersey Spirit		
- * Club domestic league appearances and goals

Dale Caya is an American retired soccer goalkeeper who was the 1990 American Professional Soccer League Goalkeeper of the Year.

Caya attended Temple University, playing on the men's soccer team from 1982 to 1985. In 1988, he played for the amateur Philadelphia Inter. In July 1989, Caya signed with the Penn-Jersey Football Club. In 1990, the club entered the American Soccer League as the Penn-Jersey Spirit. Caya was selected as first team all league that season. In 1991, he was on the roster of the Spirit for a handful of games, but never came off the bench. In 1992, he graduated from the Widener University School of Law.
