= Dave Smyth =

American soccer player and coach

Personal information
- Full name: David Smyth
- Place of birth: Hicksville, New York, United States
- Position: Defender

College career
Years	Team	Apps	(Gls)
1984–1987	North Carolina Tar Heels		

Senior career*
Years	Team	Apps	(Gls)
1988–1991	Albany Capitals		

International career
1988	United States	1	(0)

Managerial career
- 1992: Skidmore Thoroughbreds (asst.)
- 1993–1999: Duke Blue Devils (asst.)
- * Club domestic league appearances and goals

Dave Smyth is a retired U.S. soccer defender who spent two seasons in the American Soccer League and two in the American Professional Soccer League. He also earned one cap with the U.S. national team.

== Playing ==
=== High school and college ===
Smyth was the 1983 Nassau County Player of the year while playing with Hicksville High School. David Smyth attended UNC-Chapel Hill where he played as a sweeper on the men's soccer team from 1984 to 1987. He was a second team All-American in 1986 and a first team All-American in 1987. Playing as a defender, he placed eighth on the schools record. He left college to pursue a professional career before finishing his degree, but returned to UNC in the mid-1990s to gain a bachelor's degree in physical education.

=== Professional ===
In 1988, Smyth signed with the Albany Capitals of the American Soccer League. In 1990, the ASL merged with the Western Soccer League to form the American Professional Soccer League (APSL). The Capitals then spent the 1990 and 1991 season in the APSL before folding.

=== National team ===
Smyth earned one cap with the U.S. national team in a 1–0 loss to Guatemala. Most records list him as "Dan" Smyth.

== Coaching ==
After retiring from playing, Smyth spent a season as an assistant coach with Skidmore College. He then returned to North Carolina where he became an assistant men's soccer coach at Duke University until 1999. That year, he was hired to coach the Myrtle Beach Seadawgs of the USISL, but the team folded before the season began.
