= Bobby Cumming =

Scottish footballer (born 1955)

Personal information
- Full name: Robert Cumming
- Date of birth: 7 December 1955 (age 70)
- Place of birth: Airdrie, Scotland
- Height: 5 ft 8 in (1.73 m)
- Positions: Defender; midfielder

Senior career*
Years	Team	Apps	(Gls)
1971–1972	Albion Rovers	2	(0)
- Baillieston Juniors
1974–1987	Grimsby Town	365	(58)
1987–1988	Lincoln City		
1988–1990	Albany Capitals		
- Lincoln City
- Grimsby Borough
- Albany Capitals
- * Club domestic league appearances and goals

Robert Cumming (born 7 December 1955) is a Scottish former footballer. A combative defender or midfielder who spent the majority of his career at Grimsby Town, where he is remembered for the ferocity of his tackling, before joining Lincoln City in 1987. He was an integral part of Lincoln's Conference winning team and was rewarded by being voted the player of the season. He went on to enjoy another two seasons with the Imps in the Football League, and was voted 23rd in the top 100 Lincoln City league legends.

He emigrated to the United States in 1990, settling in Kendallville, Indiana and working as a finishing supervisor at MTA in Auburn, Indiana.

== Honours ==
Grimsby Town

- Football League Third Division: 1979–80
- Football League Group Cup: 1981–82
