= Chris Szanto =

American soccer player

Personal information
- Date of birth: September 17, 1967 (age 59)
- Place of birth: Poughkeepsie, New York, United States
- Height: 5 ft 10 in (1.78 m)
- Position: Defender

Youth career
- 1985–1989: NC State Wolfpack

Senior career*
Years	Team	Apps	(Gls)
1990–1991	Albany Capitals		
1990–1992	Cleveland Crunch (indoor)	54	(7)
1992–1993	Buffalo Blizzard (indoor)	36	(12)
1994–1996	New York Fever		
1997	Houston Hotshots (indoor)		

International career
1986–1987	U.S. U-20	20	(0)
- * Club domestic league appearances and goals

Chris Szanto (born September 17, 1967) is a retired American soccer defender who played professionally in the American Professional Soccer League, Major Indoor Soccer League, Continental Indoor Soccer League, NPSL and USISL. He was a member of the United States U-20 men's national soccer team which competed at the 1987 FIFA World Youth Championship.

== Youth ==
Szanto was born into a soccer family: his father immigrated to the U.S. from Hungary, bringing with him his love of the sport. Szanto was a 1984 First Team NSCAA High School All American soccer player at Arlington High School where he led his team to the 1984 State High School championship. Szanto attended the North Carolina State University where he played on the men's soccer team from 1985 to 1989. He was 1989 Third Team All American and in 2002 was named to the Atlantic Coast Conference's 50th Anniversary Men's Soccer Team.

== Professional ==
In 1990, he signed with the Albany Capitals of the American Professional Soccer League and played for them through the 1991 season. In 1990, the Cleveland Crunch selected Szanto in the first round of the Major Soccer League draft. He spent two seasons with the indoor team. In 1992, he moved to the Buffalo Blizzard of the National Professional Soccer League. In 1994, he joined the New York Fever of the USISL. Following the 1995 season, the Fever merged with the New York Centaurs and moved up to the A-League. In April 1997, the Houston Hotshots selected Szanto in the first round (eleventh overall) of the Continental Indoor Soccer League draft.

== National team ==
Szanto earned twenty caps with the United States U-20 men's national soccer team in 1986 and 1987. His time with the team culminated with three games at the 1987 FIFA World Youth Championship.
