= David Eise =

American soccer player

Personal information
- Date of birth: June 8, 1964 (age 62)
- Place of birth: St. Louis, Missouri, U.S.
- Position: Defender

Youth career
- 1984–1987: Indiana Hoosiers

Senior career*
| Years | Team | Apps | (Gls) |
| 1988–1989 | Los Angeles Lazers (indoor) | 24 | (1) |
| 1989 | California Kickers | | |
| 1989–1991 | St. Louis Storm (indoor) | 70 | (7) |
| 1991–1992 | Baltimore Blast (indoor) | 27 | (2) |
- * Club domestic league appearances and goals

David Eise is an American retired soccer defender who played professionally in the Western Soccer League and Major Indoor Soccer League.

Eise attended Indiana University, playing on the men's soccer team from 1984 to 1987. In 1988, the Los Angeles Lazers selected Eise in the Major Indoor Soccer League draft. The Lazers folded in 1989, and Eise moved to the St. Louis Storm where he played two seasons. In 1989, Eise spent the summer with the California Kickers of the Western Soccer League. On August 21, 1991, Eise signed with the Baltimore Blast. In May 1992, Eise retired from professional soccer to complete his degree at Indiana University. He graduated later that year with a bachelor's degree in criminal justice. Since then, he has held sales positions in The W.G. Watson Group and Southern Wine and Spirits of Colorado.
