= Darryl Gee =

American soccer player and coach

Personal information
- Date of birth: June 6, 1963 (age 63)
- Place of birth: Columbia, Maryland, U.S.
- Positions: Forward; defender

Youth career
- –1980: Oakland Mills Scorpions

Senior career*
Years	Team	Apps	(Gls)
1980–1984	New York Cosmos	32	(0)
1981–1984	New York Cosmos (indoor)	23	(4)
1984–1985	Los Angeles Lazers (indoor)	3	(0)
1988	Maryland Bays		
1989	Washington Diplomats		
1990–1991	Maryland Bays		

International career
1980–1981	U.S. U-20		

Managerial career
- 1999: Maryland Mania
- * Club domestic league appearances and goals

Darryl Gee (born June 6, 1963) is an American retired soccer player who played professionally in the North American Soccer League and Major Indoor Soccer League. He coaches youth soccer in Maryland.

Gee grew up in Columbia, Maryland where he was an outstanding high school soccer player for the Oakland Mills High School boys team. He scored 52 goals in 31 games during his junior and senior seasons at Oakland Mills, and was named to the 1980 Baltimore Sun High School Athlete of the Year, attracting the attention of scouts from the North American Soccer League.

After finishing high school, Gee played for the U.S. Olympic soccer team which qualified for the 1980 Summer Olympics. Gee scored a goal during the regional qualification round, which the U.S. won. However, due to the United States' boycott of the Olympics, held in the Soviet Union, Gee and his teammates were unable to compete.

Gee would go on to play for the U-20 national team at the regional qualification tournament for the 1981 FIFA World Youth Championship, to be held in Australia. The U.S. team easily handled its opponents, losing only to Mexico 2–0 in the final game. In Australia, the team did poorly, losing to Uruguay 3-0 and Poland 4-0 and tying Qatar 1-1. They then toured China, defeating Australia 2–1, but losing to China 5-1 and Egypt 1–0.

With an impressive resume at the junior level, the Minnesota Kicks of the North American Soccer League drafted Gee out of high school. The Kicks then traded Gee to the New York Cosmos in exchange for the Cosmos first and second round draft picks. However, he was unable to break into the starting lineup until June 1982. On September 28, 1982, the Cosmos played a farewell match against Brazilian club Flamengo in honor of Cosmos and Flamengo great Carlos Alberto. In that game, Alberto played the first half for the Cosmos. At half time, he gave Gee his jersey, then played the second half for Flamengo. Gee remained with the Cosmos, playing both indoor and outdoor seasons, until the team folded in 1984. In December 1987, Gee signed with the Maryland Bays of the American Soccer League. In 1990, the Bays took the APSL title. Gee retired from playing in 1992.

In 1999, he coached the Maryland Mania of the USL A-League in that team's single season of existence.

He runs the Darryl Gee Soccer Academy in Gaithersburg, Maryland.

Gee was inducted into the Maryland Soccer Hall of Fame.
