= Arizona Condors =

- Founded: 1989
- Dissolved: 1990
- Stadium: Mesa Community College; Mesa, Arizona
- Capacity: 6,000
- Owner: Tony Colecki
- Head Coach: Adrian Webster
- League: Western Soccer Alliance (1989); American Professional Soccer League (1990)
Home colors	Away colors

The Arizona Condors was an American soccer team founded in 1989 as a member of the Western Soccer League. The team folded following the 1990 season.

== History ==
In January 1989, the amateur Arizona Condors entered the Western Soccer League as an expansion team. Playing their home games at Mesa Community College, the team finished the season at 5–11, but did place forward Mark Kerlin on the All Star team. In 1990, the WSL merged with the American Soccer League to form the fully professional American Professional Soccer League. The Condors finished the 1990 season at 5–15 and folded. After the Condors folded, much of the team moved to the Phoenix Hearts of the USISL.

== Year-by-year ==
Year	Division	League	Reg. season	Playoffs	Open Cup
1989	N/A	WSA	4th, South	Did not qualify	Did not enter
1990	N/A	APSL	6th, WSL South	Did not qualify	Did not enter
