= Omid Namazi =

American soccer player-coach (born 1972)

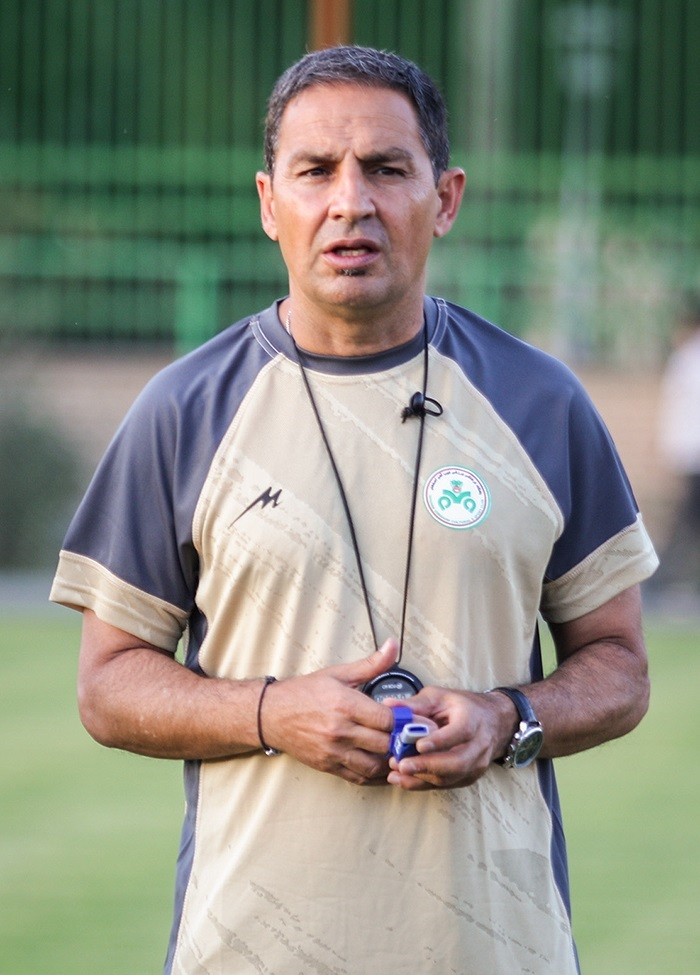
- Namazi in Zob Ahan training in 2018

Personal information
- Full name: Omid Hamid Namazi Zadeh
- Date of birth: December 8, 1972 (age 53)
- Place of birth: Provo, Utah, U.S.
- Height: 5 ft 10 in (1.78 m)
- Position: Defender

College career
Years	Team	Apps	(Gls)
1984–1987	West Virginia Mountaineers		

Senior career*
Years	Team	Apps	(Gls)
1988–1989	Washington Diplomats		
1990	Deportes Iquique		
1990–1991	Maryland Bays		
1992	Ft. Lauderdale Strikers	14	(1)
1992–1993	Reading		
1993–1994	Los Angeles Salsa		
1994–1996	Baltimore Spirit (indoor)	65	(10)
1996	Delaware Wizards		
1996	→ MetroStars (loan)	1	(0)
1996–2002	Philadelphia KiXX (indoor)	180	(72)
1997	New Jersey Stallions		
1997	Carolina Dynamo		
1998	Staten Island Vipers		
2001	South Jersey Barons	4	(0)
2003–2005	Cleveland Force (indoor)	18	(2)
2005–2006	St. Louis Steamers (indoor)	2	(0)
2007–2008	New Jersey Ironmen (indoor)	4	(0)

International career
2002–2003	United States futsal		

Managerial career
- 1999–2002: Philadelphia KiXX
- 2002–2003: San Diego Spirit
- 2004–2005: Cleveland Force
- 2005–2006: St. Louis Steamers
- 2007–2009: New Jersey Ironmen
- 2009: Ironbound (assistant)
- 2010: Chicago Red Stars
- 2010–2011: Steel Azin (assistant)
- 2011–2014: Iran (assistant)
- 2014: United States women (assistant)
- 2014–2017: United States U20 (assistant)
- 2016–2018: United States U18
- 2018: Zob Ahan
- 2019: United States U20 (assistant)
- 2019: Helsingør
- 2019: Iran U23 (assistant)
- 2019–2021: Houston Dynamo (assistant)
- 2022–2023: Hartford Athletic (assistant)
- 2023: Hartford Athletic
- 2025–: DC Power
- * Club domestic league appearances and goals

Omid Hamid Namazi Zadeh (Persian: امید نمازی; born December 8, 1972) is an Iranian-American soccer coach and former professional player who is the head coach of USL Super League club DC Power.

Namazi played professionally as a defender in the American Soccer League, American Professional Soccer League, Major League Soccer, USISL, and National Professional Soccer League. He was the NPSL's 2001 Defender of the Year and has also been a member of the United States national futsal team.

Namazi is a USSF “Pro” coaching license holder. He is a two-time Coach of the Year in the Major Indoor Soccer League and coached in the Women's United Soccer Association. As assistant coach of Iran, he led the team to qualification to the 2014 FIFA World Cup and the 2015 AFC Asian Cup.

== Early life ==
Namazi was born in Provo, Utah, when his father, Mehdi Namazi, was attending Brigham Young University to study for a master's degree. The family returned to Iran where Namazi grew up in Tehran. When he was eighteen, his father moved the family back to the United States after the Iranian Revolution. They settled in Washington, D.C. metro area of Herndon, Virginia. Namazi attended West Virginia University where he played on the men's soccer team from 1990 to 1993. He graduated with a bachelor's degree in exercise philosophy.

== Playing career ==
In 1988, Namazi turned professional with the Washington Diplomats of the American Soccer League. He spent two seasons with the Dips. Namazi played a handful of games with the Hershey Impact of the American Indoor Soccer Association during the 1989–1990 season before being released on January 13, 1990. In 1990, he moved to the Maryland Bays of the American Professional Soccer League. The Bays won the league championships that season. He played the 1991 season in Maryland before moving to the Fort Lauderdale Strikers for the 1992 season. Namazi played for Reading during the winter of 1992–1993. In April 1993, he signed with the Los Angeles Salsa of the APSL and played two seasons with them. In December 1994, he signed with the Baltimore Spirit of the National Professional Soccer League. In 1995, he was selected as Second Team All Rookie. In April 1995, the Seattle SeaDogs selected Namadi in the Continental Indoor Soccer League draft, but he declined to sign with them. In 1996, he moved outdoors with the Delaware Wizards of the USISL. He played with the MetroStars of Major League Soccer on loan from the Spirit on July 4, 1996. In June 1996, the Philadelphia KiXX selected Namazi in the NPSL expansion draft. In 1997, he was the USISL Defender of the Year with the New Jersey Stallions. In August 1997, he joined the Carolina Dynamo late in the season. In 1998, he played for the Staten Island Vipers. Namazi continued to play for the KiXX until he left four games into the 2002–2003 season. He was the 2001 NPSL Defender of the Year and won the 2002 MISL championship with the KiXX. In 2001, he played four games for the South Jersey Barons of the USISL. In December 2003, the Cleveland Force traded Steve Klein to the KiXX in exchange for the rights to Namazi. He played for the Force until 2005. In 2002 and 2003, Namazi played for the United States national futsal team.

== Managerial career ==
In March 1999, the Philadelphia KiXX fired Dave MacWilliams. Namazi, on injured reserve after knee surgery, served as interim head coach. His success led to a permanent contract in July 1999. In 2001, Namazi took the KiXX to the MISL championship series where the team fell to the Milwaukee Wave. In 2002, the KiXX won the championship, defeating the Wave. Four games into the 2002–2003 season, Namazi left the KiXX to become head coach of the San Diego Spirit of Women's United Soccer Association. He took the Spirit to the semifinals of the WUSA playoffs, the only season the Spirit made the playoffs. The WUSA collapsed at the end of the season and Namazi returned to playing for the Cleveland Force in October 2003. In March 2004, the Force named Namazi as interim head coach, making him the permanent head coach a month later. He took the Force to the 2005 MISL championship series, losing to the Milwaukee Wave. The Force collapsed during the off season. On September 21, 2005, Namazi became the head coach of the St. Louis Steamers. He took the Steamers to the championship series where they lost to the Baltimore Spirit. The Steamers folded during the off-season and Namazi moved to California to coach youth soccer for a year. He returned to coaching indoor soccer in September 2007 with the New Jersey Ironmen. On June 3, 2010, Namazi was named head coach of the Chicago Red Stars in the Women's Professional Soccer, replacing Emma Hayes.

In December 2010, Namazi was named as an assistant coach to the Iran Pro League club Steel Azin On April 28, 2011, he became assistant coach of the Iranian national team alongside Carlos Queiroz and goalkeeping coach Dan Gaspar. On June 18, 2013, Iran qualified for the 2014 FIFA World Cup, before qualifying for the 2015 AFC Asian Cup months later. On March 26, 2014, Namazi became the assistant coach of the United States women's national soccer team. Later in the year, he became the assistant coach to Tab Ramos with the United States men's national under-20 soccer team.

In January 2016, Namazi was appointed as the new head coach for the United States men's national under-18 soccer team. He won the 2017 CONCACAF U-20 Championship as assistant coach of the US team with Tab Ramos and Brad Friedel.

In May 2018, Namazi became head coach of Persian Gulf Pro League side Zob Ahan with signing a one-year deal. However, he and the club agreed to part ways only six months into the appointment.

Namazi then joined the technical staff of the United States U20 national team under manager Tab Ramos. In the beginning of April 2019, Namazi was also hired at the Danish club Helsingør. He was responsible for all scouting in North America. On April 22, Helsingør sacked their manager, and the club announced that Namazi would take charge as a caretaker for the rest of the season. On June 8, 2019, he agreed to continue as manager for the club for the upcoming season. However, Namazi expressed regret two weeks later and announced that he would not continue with the Danish club and would move back to the United States.

On September 2, 2022, Namazi joined Hartford Athletic of the USL Championship as an assistant coach and director of scouting. The move reunites Namazi with recently appointed manager Tab Ramos, who Namazi had previously coached with while on the staff of the United States men's national under-20 soccer team and the Houston Dynamo. After a 2-10-4 start to the 2023 season, Ramos was relieved of his coaching duties and Namazi was named head coach.

USL Super League club DC Power appointed Namazi as the club's head coach on July 10, 2025.

=== Managerial statistics ===
As of November 9, 2018

Team	From	To	Record							
Team	From	To	G	W	D	L	GF	GA	+/-	Win %
Zob Ahan	June 2018	November 2018	11	2	5	4	11	13	−2	18.18
Total			11	2	5	4	11	13	−2	18.18
