= Scott Cook (soccer) =

American soccer player

Personal information
- Full name: Scott G. Cook
- Place of birth: United States
- Position: Forward

Youth career
- 1983: Connecticut Huskies
- 1985–1987: South Carolina Gamecocks

Senior career*
Years	Team	Apps	(Gls)
1988	Maryland Bays		
1989	Orlando Lions		
1990–1991	Maryland Bays		
1988–1991	Dayton Dynamo (indoor)		
1991	Chicago Power (indoor)	18	(19)
1991–1995	Dayton Dynamo (indoor)		
1993	Charlotte Eagles		
- * Club domestic league appearances and goals

Scott Cook is an American retired soccer player who played professionally in the American Professional Soccer League, National Professional Soccer League and USISL.

Cook graduated Charles W. Woodward High School from where he was part of the school's 1982 Maryland state championship high school soccer team. In 1983, he attended the University of Connecticut, playing on the men's soccer team for one season before failing out of school. In 1985, Cook entered the University of South Carolina. He would play on the Gamecocks’ soccer team from 1985 to 1987. In 1988, he turned professional with the Maryland Bays of the American Soccer League. In 1989, he moved south to the Orlando Lions but was back with the Bays for the 1990 and 1991 seasons. In the fall of 1988, Cook also began his indoor soccer career. That year, he signed with the Dayton Dynamo of the National Professional Soccer League. Cook began the 1990–1991 season with Dynamo, scoring fourteen goals in eighteen games. However, in January 1991, Cook criticized Dynamo's owner for firing head coach Tony Glavin. The team suspended Cook, then traded him to the Chicago Power in exchange for cash. The Power won the NPSL championship that season. In September, the Power traded Cook back to the Dynamo in exchange for Mark Simpson. Cook remained with the Dynamo through the 1994–1995 season. In 1993, he also played for the Charlotte Eagles of the USISL. He was named to the USISL All Atlantic team that season. On May 11, 2018, Cook was inducted into the 2018 Maryland State Soccer Hall of Fame for outstanding contributions to the game of soccer.
