= New Jersey Eagles =

Former American soccer team

The New Jersey Eagles were an American soccer team founded in 1987 as the Cosmopolitan Eagles. In 1988, they entered the third American Soccer League as the New Jersey Eagles. They folded following the 1990 American Professional Soccer League season.

== History ==
Founded as the Cosmopolitan Eagles in 1987, they played an independent exhibition schedule that year. In 1988, they joined the American Soccer League, moving to the American Professional Soccer League in 1990 when the ASL merged with the Western Soccer League. League goals leader Jorge Acosta led the team to a first-place regular season finish in its first campaign, but it was all downhill after that. The bright spots of the 1989 and 1990 seasons were the play of the defense, anchored by ex-New York Cosmos players Andranik Eskandarian and Hubert Birkenmeier. Unfortunately, the offense sputtered in the wake of chronic knee injuries to Acosta, and the team lost many low-scoring one-goal games.

The Eagles played their home matches at Paterson, New Jersey's Hinchliffe Stadium during their first two seasons, and at Cochrane Stadium in Jersey City in their final season.

== Year-by-year ==
Year	Division	League	Reg. season	Playoffs	Open Cup
1988	N/A	ASL	1st, Northern	Semifinals	Did not enter
1989	N/A	ASL	5th, Northern	Did not qualify	Did not enter
1990	N/A	APSL	6th, ASL North	Did not qualify	Did not enter

== Ownership and staff ==
- (United States) Dominick Flora - President

== Head coach ==
- (United States) Ed Kelly – 1988

== Yearly awards ==
ASL Top Goal Scorer

- 1988 - Jorge Acosta (14 Goals)

ASL Top Points Scorer

- 1988 - Jorge Acosta (32 Points)

ASL All-Star Team Selection

- 1988 - Jorge Acosta Brian Ainscough
- 1989 - Paul Riley
