= John Abe =

German-American soccer player

Personal information
- Date of birth: October 12
- Place of birth: Furth, Germany
- Positions: Forward; midfielder

College career
Years	Team	Apps	(Gls)
- Essex Community College

Senior career*
Years	Team	Apps	(Gls)
1987–1991	Maryland Bays	74	(14)
1988–1991	Hershey Impact (indoor)	83	(80)
1991–1993	Harrisburg Heat (indoor)	72	(64)
1993–1994	Baltimore Spirit (indoor)	20	(12)
1995	Albany Alleycats		
- * Club domestic league appearances and goals

John Abe is a German-American retired soccer player who played professionally in the American Professional Soccer League and National Professional Soccer League.

== Early years ==
Born in Germany to an American military father and a German mother, Abe moved to Baltimore, Maryland when he was thirteen. He graduated from Northern High School before attending Essex Community College where he was a two-time junior college All American. In 1981, the Baltimore Blast drafted Abe in the 2nd round of the MISL draft .

== Career ==
In 1987, Abe signed with the Maryland Bays of the newly created American Soccer League. He remained with the Bays through the 1991 season and scored the game winning penalty kick in the 1990 APSL Championship game against the San Francisco Blackhawks. In the fall of 1988, he moved indoors with the Hershey Impact of the American Indoor Soccer Association. In 1991, the Impact moved to Harrisburg, Pennsylvania and became the Harrisburg Heat. Abe was named the first ever captain of the Heat but after just two season in Harrisburg, the team released Abe after they could not agree on contract terms. On November 23, 1993, Abe signed with the Baltimore Spirit. In 1995, he played his last season of professional soccer with the Albany Alleycats of the USISL. In 2001 Abe was named to the Harrisburg Heat All Decade team (1991–2001).

== Post-soccer career ==
Since retiring from professional soccer, Abe has been working for the Pennsylvania State Education Association and he coaches youth soccer in Central Pennsylvania. Abe has his USSF National "B" License and he also completed the three-week "B" level International Coaching Course of the German Football Association (DFB) (2013)

== Personal life ==
Abe currently lives in Enola, Pennsylvania.

He was inducted into the Maryland Soccer Association Hall of Fame in 2000.
