= Jean Harbor =

Nigerian-American soccer player

Personal information
- Date of birth: September 19, 1965 (age 61)
- Place of birth: Lagos, Nigeria
- Height: 6 ft 1 in (1.85 m)
- Position: Forward

College career
Years	Team	Apps	(Gls)
1983–1986	Alabama A&M Bulldogs		

Senior career*
Years	Team	Apps	(Gls)
- NEPA Lagos F.C.
- Enugu Rangers
1988–1989	Washington Diplomats		(14)
1990–1991	Maryland Bays	?	(25)
1991–1992	Baltimore Blast (indoor)	31	(14)
1992–1993	Tampa Bay Rowdies	29	(18)
1994	Montreal Impact	15	(13)
1995	Buffalo Blizzard (indoor)	7	(2)
1995	→ Seattle SeaDogs (loan) (indoor)	26	(40)
1996–1997	Colorado Rapids	29	(11)
1997	Seattle SeaDogs (indoor)		
1998–1999	Florida ThunderCats (indoor)	26	(25)
1999	Philadelphia KiXX (indoor)	15	(16)

International career
1992–1997	United States	15	(0)
- * Club domestic league appearances and goals

Azuka Jeanard Harbor (born September 19, 1965, in Lagos, Nigeria) is a Nigerian American former soccer player who was a forward for teams in Nigeria and the United States, where he moved in 1983 and gained citizenship in 1992. He earned 15 caps with the U.S. national team and was chosen second overall in the 1996 MLS Inaugural Player Draft by the Colorado Rapids.

== Youth ==
Harbor was born and raised in Nigeria, where he played for NEPA Lagos F.C. and Enugu Rangers. He moved to the United States in to attend college at Alabama A&M University in Normal, Alabama, where he majored in chemistry and was a forward on the men's soccer team from 1983 to 1986. He was a three-time second- and third-team All-American and held the school's career scoring record when he graduated.

== Early career ==
Evidence suggests he did not play soccer professionally for two years after graduating from Alabama A&M. One article mentions that he worked in a Maryland laboratory for several years after leaving Alabama. He apparently even continued to work at the facility after he began his professional playing career.

== Professional ==
In June 1988, the Washington Diplomats of the new American Soccer League (ASL) signed Harbor after Diplomats owner Julio Pinon noticed him play at the Embassy Cup tournament in Washington, D.C. that month. The Diplomats had struggled to score that season, but Harbor made an immediate impact and the team went on to win the ASL championship.

Harbor continued his high-scoring ways in the 1989 season, but was suspended by the league after striking Pedro Magallanes in the face during a game with the Fort Lauderdale Strikers. Limited by the month-long suspension, Harbor scored seven goals that season. In 1990, Harbor moved to the Maryland Bays. By then, the ASL had merged with the Western Soccer League to form the American Professional Soccer League (APSL). Harbor spent two seasons with the Bays. In 1990, he scored eight goals as the Bays won the league championship in a 2–1 victory over the San Francisco Bay Blackhawks. In 1991, Harbor led the league in scoring with 17 goals and 11 assists in 20 games as the Bays fell to the Albany Capitals in the semifinals; Harbor was named the league's most valuable player. The Bays folded at the end of the season.

With the collapse of the Bays, Harbor moved indoors in the fall of 1991 with the Baltimore Blast of the Major Soccer League. In 1992, the league and the Blast folded, and Harbor returned to the APSL, this time with the Tampa Bay Rowdies. By then, the struggling APSL had only five teams remaining. Harbor led the league in scoring with 13 goals and four assists in 15 games, earning first-team all-star honors. The Rowdies reached the championship game and lost to the Colorado Foxes. His five goals in four matches led all scorers in the 1992 Professional Cup, which involved eight clubs from three leagues: the APSL, the Canadian Soccer League, and the National Professional Soccer League (NPSL). Tampa Bay was defeated by Colorado again in the cup final. Harbor's scoring production fell in 1993, finishing the season with five goal and seven assists in 14 games. That season, the Rowdies lost to the Foxes in the playoff semifinals before folding.

In 1994, Harbor moved to the Montreal Impact. He exacted revenge on the Colorado Foxes that season, scoring the lone goal in the Impact's 1-0 victory over the Foxes in the title game. In March 1995, Harbor signed with the indoor Buffalo Blizzard of the NPSL amid their playoff push. The Blizzard made the playoffs but fell to the Cleveland Crunch in the first round. Harbor played seven regular-season games, scoring two goals; he played in all three of Buffalo's playoff games. In April 1995, Harbor signed a contract with Major League Soccer (MLS). However, when the league delayed its first season by a year, the league loaned him to the Seattle SeaDogs of the Continental Indoor Soccer League (CISL). In 26 games, he scored 40 goals.

In February 1996, MLS held its first player draft. The Colorado Rapids selected Harbor with the second pick of the draft. In that first season, Harbor led the team in scoring with 11 goals in 29 games, but the Rapids finished at the bottom of the table and failed to make the playoffs. Harbor then injured his knee in the 1997 preseason, requiring surgery. The Rapids released him in June 1997. Harbor returned to the Seattle SeaDogs and was the CISL all-star game's MVP. That season, Harbor also helped lead Seattle to the final CISL championship, defeating the Houston Hotshots two games to zero. Once again, Harbor's team and league folded at the end of the season. In October 1997, Harbor moved to the Florida ThunderCats of the NPSL as the team began preparations for its first and ultimately, only, season. The ThunderCats had significant financial problems during the 1998–1999 season and sold Harbor's contract to the Philadelphia KiXX before the 1999 playoffs. Harbor's playing career ended at age 33.

== National team ==
In 1992, Harbor became an American citizen. U.S. coach Bora Milutinović quickly called him up for an October 9 match against Canada. Harbor went on to earn fourteen caps while Milutinović was the coach, but he was unable to score. Milutinović dropped him from the national team after the 1993 Copa América, but he earned one more cap under Steve Sampson on October 16, 1996. The regular national-team players had gone on strike and USSF was forced to field an ad hoc player lineup for a game against Peru.

== Post-playing career ==
In 2004, Harbor worked for NASA.

== Personal ==
Harbor's son, Nyck Harbor, is a is an American football wide receiver and sprinter for the South Carolina Gamecocks. He was a highly regarded recruit at Archbishop Carroll High School in Washington who won the 2023 Franklin D. Watkins Memorial Award, which recognizes African American senior male high-school athletes who demonstrate academic, athletic, and community-service excellence.
