= Penn-Jersey Spirit =

Penn-Jersey Spirit played in the American Professional Soccer League in 1990 and 1991. The team's home stadium was Lions Stadium in Ewing Township, New Jersey, on the campus of Trenton State College (since renamed as The College of New Jersey). The team also played a small number of home games at La Salle University.

The team was coached by Dave MacWilliams and assisted by former local professional player Tom O'Dea. Mike Romeo was the team's goalkeeper coach. Notable players included Cris Vaccaro and Dan Donigan as well as a pair of current NCAA Division I coaches, David Masur of St. John's University and George Gelnovatch of University of Virginia. The team also had Matt Knowles, who was the first draft pick of the New York/New Jersey Metrostars in 1996.

The original ownership group included Spencer Rockman and Pat Varsalona, who were the co-founders of the Garden State Soccer League, New Jersey's largest adult semipro/amateur soccer league and long-time soccer entrepreneur Charles Cuttone, who sold his interest before the team's first season. Then-Rutgers head coach Bob Reasso served as the team's General Manager.

Although reasonably well-supported, the team ceased operations after its second season.

== Ownership ==
- (United States) Spencer Rockman - Co-Owner
- (United States) Pat Varsalona - Co-Owner
- (United States) Vincent Baldino - Co-Owner
- (United States) Charles Cuttone - Co-Owner

== Coaching staff ==
- (United States) Dave MacWilliams - Head Coach (1990-1991)
- (Brazil) Paulo Dias - Head Coach (1991)
- (United States) Tom O'Dea - Assistant Coach
- (United States) Mike Romeo - Goalkeeping Coach

== Honors ==
First Team All Star

- 1990 Dale Caya, Brian Ainscough, George Gelnovatch, Dan Donigan

Second Team All Star

- 1990 Pat O'Kelley

== Year-by-year ==
Year	Division	League	Reg. season	Playoffs	Open Cup	Avg. attendance
1990	1	APSL	3rd, ASL North	Did not qualify	Did not enter	2,614
1991	1	APSL	4th, American	Did not qualify	Did not enter	
