= Real Santa Barbara =

Former soccer team

Real Santa Barbara was a soccer team. The name real, meaning royal, came from Spanish teams (as in Real Madrid), just like current MLS club Real Salt Lake. The club played in the city of Santa Barbara, California. It was active for the 1989 season in the Western Soccer League and the 1990 season in the American Professional Soccer League.

== Coaches ==
- (United States) Andy Kuenzli (1989)
- (Soviet Union) Valery Volostnykh (1990)

== Former players ==
- (United States) Tim Vom Steeg (1989–90)
- (United States) Paul Krumpe (1990)

== Year-by-year ==
Year	Division	League	Reg. season	Playoffs	Open Cup
1989	N/A	WSL	3rd, South	Did not qualify	Did not enter
1990	N/A	APSL	4th, WSL South	WSL 1st Round	Did not enter
