= Los Angeles Heat =

- Nickname: LA Heat
Home colors	Away colors

The Los Angeles Heat was an American professional soccer team. The Heat joined the Western Soccer Alliance in 1986, then the American Professional Soccer League in 1990 when the WSL merged with the American Soccer League. The club played in Torrance, California at West High School until their final season in 1990.

The club folded in early 1991 following a season of low attendance and the lack of a suitable stadium after an announced move to Orange County. The Heat had accumulated $30,000 in unpaid bills and were one of several APSL teams to fold.

== Ownership and staff ==
- (Armenia) John Ajemain - President / Co-Owner (1990–91)
- (United States) Roland Martin - Co-Owner / Founder (1986–91)
- (United States) Lionel Conway - Co-Owner (1990–91)
- (United States) Eugene Schiappa - Co-Owner / Founder (1986–91)
- (United States) Dave Graefe - Co-Owner / Founder (1986–91)
- (United States) Mike Hogue - General Manager (1986–89)
- (United States) Dick White - General Manager (1990–91)
- (United States) Jill Fracisco - General Manager (1989–90)
- (United States) Bobby Bruch - Community Services Director
- (United States) Dawn Smith - Public Relations Director

== Coaching staff ==
- (Netherlands) Wim Suurbier (1986)
- (United States) Marine Cano (1987–88)
- (England) Bobby Sibbald (1989–90) Head Coach
- (United States) John Britton - Player/Assistant Coach (1986-1988, 1990). Head Coach (1988-1989)
- (England) Justin Fashanu - Player/Assistant Coach (1989)

== Year-by-year ==
Year	Division	League	Reg. season	Playoffs	Open Cup
1986	N/A	WSA	4th	No playoffs	Did not enter
1987	N/A	WSA	5th	Did not qualify	Did not enter
1988	N/A	WSA	4th	Did not qualify	Did not enter
1989	N/A	WSL	2nd, South	Semifinals	Did not enter
1990	N/A	APSL	2nd, WSL South	WSL Final	Did not enter
