= Albany Capitals =

Defunct American soccer club

The Albany Capitals joined the third incarnation of the American Soccer League in 1988. The team joined the American Professional Soccer League in 1990 when the ASL merged with the Western Soccer League.

The club was based in Albany, New York, and played their home games at Bleecker Stadium.

After the collapse of the NASL, the ASL took up the void. Several former NASL and International stars joined Albany including Chico Borja, Elvis Comrie and Hubert Birkenmeier (Cosmos), and England's World Cup star Paul Mariner (Ipswich, Arsenal).

== Year-by-year ==
Year	Division	League	Reg. season	Playoffs	Open Cup
1988	N/A	ASL	5th, Northern	Did not qualify	Did not enter
1989	N/A	ASL	3rd, Northern	Did not qualify	Did not enter
1990	N/A	APSL	2nd, ASL North	ASL Semifinals	Did not enter
1991	N/A	APSL	2nd, American	Final	Did not enter

Year	W	L	GF	GA	PTS
1988	7	13	26	35	21
1989	11	9	29	19	36
1990	14	6	35	22	42
1991	10	11	27	29	92

== Ownership and staff ==
- (United States) Armand Quadrini – Owner
- (United States) Joe Hennessey – General Manager
- (United States) Charlie Curto – Technical Advisor

== Former managers ==
- (England) Paul Mariner
- (England) John Bramley
