= Maryland Bays =

Former American Soccer League team

The Maryland Bays were an inaugural franchise of the third incarnation of the American Soccer League in 1988. They were based in Catonsville, Maryland, and played their games at the University of Maryland-Baltimore County. The team joined the American Professional Soccer League in 1990 when the ASL merged with the Western Soccer League. After the 1990 season, the club absorbed the Washington Stars, and moved to play in Columbia, Maryland.

For the first Maryland-based team called the Bays in 1967, see Baltimore Bays of the NPSL/NASL. For the second team to use the name in the ASL, see Baltimore Bays (ASL). For the fourth team to use the name in the USISL, see Baltimore Bays (USISL).

== Year-by-year ==
Year	Division	League	Reg. season	Playoffs	Open Cup
1988	2	ASL	2nd, Northern	Semifinals	Did not enter
1989	2	ASL	4th, Northern	Did not qualify	Did not enter
1990	2	APSL	1st, ASL North	Champion	Did not enter
1991	2	APSL	1st, Western	Semifinals	Did not enter

== Owner ==
- John Liparini

== Coach ==
- (United States) Lincoln Phillips (1988)
- (United States) Pete Caringi 1990
- (United States) Gary Hindley 1991

== Honors ==
Championships

- American Professional Soccer Champions 1990 defeated San Francisco Blackhawks in the Finals.
- 1990 Record 20–5–0 Undefeated in Playoffs, including Sweep of Tampa and Ft. Lauderdale in Playoffs.

MVP

- 1990 Philip Gyau
- 1991 Jean Harbor

Leading Scorer

- 1991 Jean Harbor

Coach of the Year

- 1991 Gary Hindley

First Team All Star

- 1988 Rob Ryerson, Elvis Comrie
- 1989 Eric Hawkes
- 1990 Philip Gyau
- 1991 Kevin Sloan, Jean Harbor
