= American Professional Soccer League =

Defunct soccer league in North America

- APSL logo (1993)
- Sport: Soccer
- Founded: 1990
- Folded: 1996
- No. of teams: 22 in 1990
- Country: United States; Canada
- Last champion: Seattle Sounders
- Broadcaster: Prime Network

The American Professional Soccer League (APSL) was a professional men's soccer league with teams from the United States and later Canada. It was formed in 1990 by the merger of the third American Soccer League with the Western Soccer League. It was the first outdoor soccer league to feature teams from throughout the United States since the demise of the North American Soccer League in 1984.

The league was sanctioned as Division II in the United States soccer league system but was the country's de facto top professional soccer league until 1995. In 1993, the APSL applied for the vacant Division I role but lost out to Major League Soccer who would begin play in 1996.

For its final two seasons in 1995 and 1996, the APSL changed its name to the A-League. It was subsequently absorbed by the emerging USISL organization with six of seven clubs joining the new USISL A-League in 1997. The USISL (later USL) retained the A-League name until 2004 when it became the USL First Division.

== History ==
In 1989, a match was held between the winners of the American Soccer League and the winners of the Western Soccer League to declare a national soccer champion. On February 22, 1990, the two leagues merged as the American Professional Soccer League. To reduce travel expenses, the inaugural season would be played under two separate leagues akin to Major League Baseball: the ASL became the American Soccer Conference and featured teams from the East Coast, while the WSL became the Western Soccer Conference and featured teams from the West Coast. Teams only played other teams from within the same conference and it was not until the title decider, between Maryland Bays and San Francisco Bay Blackhawks that teams from the two different conferences actually met in a competitive game.

Throughout its existence, the league would struggle financially and its roster of teams quickly dropped from 22 in 1990 to just 5 in 1992. However, in 1993 the league expanded when following the demise of the Canadian Soccer League, three former CSL clubs – Vancouver 86ers, Montreal Impact and Toronto Blizzard – joined the APSL.

As part of the conditions for been awarded the 1994 FIFA World Cup, the United States Soccer Federation had agreed to launch a new Division I professional league. In December 1993, together with League One America and Major League Soccer, the APSL was one of three proposals that was put before the USSF national board of directors. At the time the APSL was the only candidate who were currently operating a soccer league. It featured several established clubs and its roster of players included several members of the United States men's national soccer team. Despite this they lost out to MLS.

Despite rebranding itself as the A-League in 1995, it faced increasing competition on two fronts. The USISL had initially confined itself to organizing regional leagues but by 1995, it began organizing on a national level. By 1996, MLS was also up and running and a number of top A-League players left to join it. In 1996 the A-League and the USISL Select League, both operating as USSF Division II leagues, agreed to merge. Six of the seven remaining A-League teams, the Montreal Impact, Colorado Foxes, Seattle Sounders, Rochester Raging Rhinos, Vancouver 86ers, and Atlanta Ruckus, and two planned A-League expansion teams, the Toronto Lynx and Hershey Wildcats, effectively joined the USISL Select League in 1997. The combined league was operated by USISL but retained the A-League name.

== Complete team list ==
- Albany Capitals (1990–91) (New York)
- Arizona Condors (1990) (Arizona)
- Atlanta Ruckus (1995–96) (Georgia)
- Boston Bolts (1990) (Massachusetts)
- California Emperors (1990) (California)
- Colorado Foxes (1990–96) (Colorado)
- Fort Lauderdale Strikers (1990–94) (Florida)
- Los Angeles Heat (1990) (California)
- Los Angeles Salsa (1993–94) (California)
- Maryland Bays (1990–91) (Maryland)
- Miami Freedom (1990–92) (Florida)
- Montreal Impact (1993–96) (Quebec)
- New Jersey Eagles (1990) (New Jersey)
- New Mexico Chiles (1990) (New Mexico)
- New York Centaurs (1995) (New York)
- New York Fever (1996) (New York)
- Orlando Lions (1990) (Florida)
- Penn-Jersey Spirit (1990–91) (Pennsylvania)
- Portland Timbers (1990) (Oregon)
- Real Santa Barbara (1990) (California)
- Rochester Raging Rhinos (1996) (New York)
- Salt Lake Sting (1990–91) (Utah)
- San Diego Nomads (1990) (California)
- San Francisco Bay Blackhawks (1990–92) (California)
- Seattle Sounders (1994–96) (Washington)
- Seattle Storm (1990) (Washington)
- Tampa Bay Rowdies (1990–93) (Florida)
- Toronto Blizzard (1993) (Ontario)
- Toronto Rockets (1994) (Ontario)
- Vancouver 86ers (1993–96) (British Columbia)
- Washington Diplomats (1990) (Washington, D.C.)
- Washington Stars (1990) (Washington, D.C.)

== Champions ==
=== By year ===
Year	Teams	Winner	Runner-up	Top scorer
1990	22	Maryland Bays	San Francisco Bay Blackhawks	Chance Fry
1991	9	San Francisco Bay Blackhawks	Albany Capitals	Jean Harbor
1992	5	Colorado Foxes	Tampa Bay Rowdies	Jean Harbor
1993	7	Colorado Foxes	Los Angeles Salsa	Paulinho Criciúma
1994	7	Montreal Impact	Colorado Foxes	Paul Wright
1995	6	Seattle Sounders	Atlanta Ruckus	Peter Hattrup
1996	7	Seattle Sounders	Rochester Raging Rhinos	Wolde Harris

=== By club ===
Club	Winner	Runner-up	Seasons won
Colorado Foxes	2	1	1992, 1993
Seattle Sounders	2	0	1995, 1996
Maryland Bays	1	0	1990
San Francisco Bay Blackhawks	1	1	1991
Montreal Impact	1	0	1994

== League average attendance ==
- Regular season/playoffs
- 1996: 4,946/4,781
- 1995: 3,347/5,280
- 1994: 3,478/6,082
- 1993: 2,271/2,903
- 1992: 2,104/1,502
- 1991: 1,827/3,106
- 1990: 1,082/2,039
