= 1992 U.S. Interregional Soccer League (outdoor) season =

The 1992 United States Interregional Soccer League was an American outdoor soccer season run by the United States Interregional Soccer League.

== Regular season ==
- Regulation win = 6 points
- Shootout win (SW) = 4 points
- Shootout loss (SL) = 2 points
- Regulation loss = 0 points
- Bonus points (BP): An additional one point per goal up to a maximum of three points per game.

=== Southeast Conference ===
Place	Team	GP	W	L	SW	SL	GF	GA	GD	BP	Points
1	Orlando Lions	14	10	2	0	2	37	17	+20	30	94
2	Boca Raton Sabres	14	10	4	0	0	27	17	+10	26	86
3	Atlanta Datagraphic Magic	14	8	4	2	0	35	20	+15	29	85
4	Memphis United Express	14	8	5	0	1	36	22	+14	27	77
5	Nashville Metros	14	5	8	1	0	25	23	+2	21	55
6	Chattanooga Railroaders	14	2	10	1	1	22	40	−18	19	37
7	Gwinnett County Steamers	14	2	11	0	1	12	36	−24	11	25

=== South Central Conference ===
Place	Team	GP	W	L	SW	SL	GF	GA	GD	BP	Points
1	Dallas Rockets	14	12	0	1	1	29	13	+16	27	105
2	Oklahoma City Warriors	14	7	7	0	0	22	24	−2	21	63
3	Dallas Americans	14	6	8	0	0	21	22	−1	20	56
4	San Antonio Generals	14	6	8	0	0	27	32	−5	20	54
5	Austin Soccadillos	14	5	8	0	1	19	27	−6	17	49
6	Arkansas Diamonds	14	1	12	1	0	13	47	−34	11	21

=== Southwest Conference ===
Place	Team	GP	W	L	SW	SL	GF	GA	GD	BP	Points
1	El Paso Patriots	14	12	2	0	0	32	15	+17	29	96
2	New Mexico Chiles	14	6	5	1	2	29	22	−7	24	95
3	Tucson Amigos	14	5	8	0	1	23	36	−13	20	52
4	Arizona Cotton	14	4	9	1	0	22	28	−6	20	48

=== Pacific Conference ===
Place	Team	GP	W	L	SW	SL	GF	GA	GD	BP	Points
1	Palo Alto Firebirds	12	12	2	2	0	32	15	+17	26	94
2	North Bay Breakers	14	10	4	0	0	32	13	+19	26	86
3	San Francisco All Blacks	14	7	7	0	0	25	26	+1	23	65
4	East Bay Red Riders	14	7	7	0	0	25	24	+1	21	63

== Playoffs ==
=== First round ===
==== Oklahoma City Warriors vs. Dallas Americans ====
July 31, 1992
8:00 PM (CST)

Oklahoma City Warriors (OK)	0–2	Dallas Americans (TX)

Western Heights High School, Oklahoma City, Oklahoma

August 1, 1992
7:30 PM (EST)

Oklahoma City Warriors (OK)	3–0	Dallas Americans (TX)

Western Heights High School, Oklahoma City, Oklahoma

==== Tucson Amigos vs New Mexico Chiles ====
- Tucson Amigos defeated New Mexico Chiles: 2–0, 3–1
July 31, 1992
8:00 PM MDT

Tucson Amigos	2–0	New Mexico Chiles
Cathal Ledwith 47', 66'	Report

Rincon High School
Tucson, Arizona
August 2, 1992
1:00 PM MDT

New Mexico Chiles	1–3	Tucson Amigos
Felipe Ternero (55:10)	Report	36' Narciso Zazueta; (71:40) Olu Molomo; 79' Wade Colwell

University Stadium
Albuquerque, New Mexico

==== Atlanta Datagraphis Magic vs Memphis United Express ====
- Atlanta Datagraphic Magic defeated Memphis United Express: 5–1, 1–0
August 1, 1992
1:00 PM CDT

Memphis United Express	1–5	Atlanta Datagraphic Magic

Rhodes College
Memphis, Tennessee
August 1992

Atlanta Datagraphic Magic	v	Memphis United Express

=== Second round ===
- Dallas Rockets defeated Oklahoma City Warriors: 0–2, 3–1, 2–0 (MG)
- Tucson Amigos defeated El Paso Patriots: 1–2 (SO), 2–1
- Atlanta Datagraphic Magic defeated Boca Raton Sabres: 0–2, 3–0
- Palo Alto Firebirds defeated North Bay Breakers: 0–1, 4–2, 2–0 (MG)

=== Sizzlin' Six ===
August 14, 1992
5:00 PM (EST)

El Paso Patriots (TX)	3–1	Atlanta Datagraphic Magic (GA)

University High School, Orlando, Florida

August 14, 1992
7:00 PM (EST)

Orlando Lions (FL)	0–2	Palo Alto Firebirds (CA)
Azziz Essaffi (yellow card) 38'; Azziz Essaffi (yellow card) 39' (red card)	(Report)	Craig Huft; Jason Vanacour

University High School, Orlando, Florida

August 14, 1992
9:00 PM (EST)

Dallas Rockets (TX)	1–3	Tucson Amigos (AZ)

University High School, Orlando, Florida

August 15, 1992
4:00 PM (EST)

Dallas Rockets (TX)	3–2	Atlanta Datagraphic Magic (GA)

University High School, Orlando, Florida

August 15, 1992
6:00 PM (EST)

Orlando Lions (FL)	0–2	Tucson Amigos (AZ)
Tom Wurdack (red card) 48'; Paul Holmes (red card) 70'	(Report)	Narciso Zazueta; Andrew Kummer

University High School, Orlando, Florida

August 15, 1992
8:00 PM (EST)

Palo Alto Firebirds (CA)	2–0	El Paso Patriots (TX)

University High School, Orlando, Florida

== Final ==
August 16, 1992
7:00 PM (EST)

Palo Alto Firebirds (CA)	1–0	Tucson Amigos (AZ)
Jim Hutchinson 79'	(Report)

University High School, Orlando, Florida

== Points leaders ==
Rank	Scorer	Club	GP	Goals	Assists	Points
1	Efren Rodarte	El Paso Patriots	13	14	7	35
2	Sheldon Lee	Orlando Lions	13	13	3	29
3	Rahman Alarape	Atlanta Datagraphic Magic	10	10	1	21
3	Tim Trevino	Dallas Rockets	12	9	3	21
5	A. Pastor	North Bay Breakers	13			19

== Honors ==
- Most Valuable Player: Sheldon Lee
- Top Goal Scorer: Efren Rodarte, El Paso Patriots (14 goals)
- Points leader: Efren Rodarte, El Paso Patriots (35 points)
- Assists leader: Cory Kirkspell, Nashville Metros (7 assists)
- Coach of the Year: Joe Silviera
- Organization of the Year: Orlando Lions
- All League
  - Goalkeeper: Vince Da Silva
  - Defenders: Greg Schwager, Eric Dade, Guillermo McFarlane, Denny Panayi
  - Midfielders: Craig Huft, Robin Chan, Jim Hutchinson, Roderick Scott
  - Forwards: John Olu–Molomo, Narciso Zazueta
