= 1993 U.S. Interregional Soccer League (outdoor) season =

The 1993 United States Interregional Soccer League was an American outdoor soccer season run by the United States Interregional Soccer League.

== Southern Challenge Cup ==
In 1993, the league introduced the Southern Challenge Cup, a short season for teams which the league was considering for membership. The cup would allow these provisional teams to test their organization before beginning a season long competitive schedule. During the cup, the four provisional teams also played games against other teams in the league. These games counted both in the USISL and Southern Challenge Cup standings. The cup was capped by a final between the two top teams in which the Riverboat Gamblers defeated the Grasshoppers.

Place	Team	GP	W	L	GF	GA	GD	Points
1	New Orleans Riverboat Gamblers	9	6	3	20	17	+3	48
2	Birmingham Grasshoppers	9	5	4	18	9	+9	45
3	Jacksonville Fury	9	4	5	15	27	-12	35
4	Montgomery Capitals	9	2	7	13	38	-25	25

=== Final ===
1993

New Orleans Riverboat Gamblers (LA)	1-0	Birmingham Grasshoppers (AL)

== Regular season ==
=== Scoring ===
The standings published by the USISL list only the wins, losses, goals scored, goals allowed and total points. They do not provide the number of wins or losses that came through shootouts. They also do not provide the number of bonus points coming from goals or corner kicks.

- Regulation win = 6 points
- Shootout win (SW) = 4 points
- Shootout loss (SL) = 2 points
- Regulation loss = 0 points
- Bonus points (BP): An additional one-point per goal up to a maximum of three points per game.
- Northeast Division and Midwest Division teams received one point per corner kick each game.

=== Atlantic Division ===
Place	Team	GP	W	L	GF	GA	GD	Points
1	Greensboro Dynamo	16	14	2	41	14	+27	114
2	Delaware Wizards	16	10	6	34	22	+12	88
3	Raleigh Flyers	16	10	6	31	24	+7	84
4	Richmond Kickers	16	8	8	30	30	0	78
5	Charleston Battery	16	8	8	27	33	-6	72
6	Connecticut Wolves	16	7	9	29	33	-4	68
7	Baltimore Bays	16	5	11	28	38	-10	59
8	Charlotte Eagles	16	5	11	26	35	-9	52
9	Columbia Spirit	16	3	13	12	43	-31	32

=== Southeast Division ===
Place	Team	GP	W	L	GF	GA	GD	Points
1	Orlando Lions	16	14	2	46	10	+36	124
2	Atlanta Lasers	16	10	6	44	34	+10	93
3	Coral Springs Kicks	16	10	6	42	43	-1	92
4	Memphis Jackals	16	9	7	49	30	+19	87
5	Boca Raton Sabres	16	8	8	37	31	+6	80
6	Nashville Metros	16	6	10	29	37	-8	60
7	Chattanooga Express	16	3	13	33	45	-12	52

=== South Central Division ===
Place	Team	GP	W	L	GF	GA	GD	Points
1	Tulsa Roughnecks	16	12	4	33	18	+15	99
2	Oklahoma City Slickers	16	11	5	34	32	+2	97
3	Dallas Rockets	16	11	5	34	17	+17	94
4	San Antonio Pumas	16	8	8	39	35	+4	83
5	Austin Soccadillos	16	8	8	30	33	-3	69
6	DFW Toros	16	5	11	22	42	-20	52
7	Tyler Lightning	16	5	11	22	40	-18	49

=== Southwest Division ===
Place	Team	GP	W	L	GF	GA	GD	Points
1	East Los Angeles Cobras	16	11	5	40	18	+22	101
2	Montclair Standard Falcons	16	10	6	30	33	-3	89
3	El Paso Patriots	16	10	6	34	16	+18	87
4	New Mexico Chiles	16	9	7	25	15	+10	73
5	Tucson Amigos	16	8	8	23	30	-7	72
6	Valley Golden Eagles	16	3	13	20	42	-22	37
7	Arizona Cotton	16	3	13	12	43	-31	29

=== Pacific Division ===
Place	Team	GP	W	L	GF	GA	GD	Points
1	San Jose Hawks	16	14	2	42	11	+31	119
2	Palo Alto Firebirds	16	12	4	50	8	+42	107
3	San Francisco United All-Blacks	16	13	3	39	17	+22	106
4	Chico Rooks	16	11	5	47	29	+18	98
5	North Bay Breakers	16	8	8	37	25	+12	79
6	Santa Cruz Surf	16	7	9	27	42	-15	66
7	San Francisco Bay Diablos	16	3	13	20	51	-31	38
8	East Bay Red Riders	16	2	14	51	13	-38	13

== Playoffs ==
It appears the USISL allowed each division to determine how its teams entered the playoffs. In the Atlantic Division, the Richmond Kickers and Charleston Battery played a one-time game to determine who went to the division semifinals, despite the Kickers having six more points in the standings than the Battery. In the Southeast Division, the Orlando Lions had a bye into the Sizzlin' Six Tournament as reigning champions. Therefore, the next four teams entered the divisional semifinals. In the Southwest Division, the top three teams qualified for the playoffs, but the next two teams did not enter. Instead, the Valley Golden Eagles with a 3-13 record entered the divisional playoffs. In the rest of the divisions, the top four teams made the divisional playoffs.

=== Atlantic Division ===
==== Play-in game ====
July 28, 1993
7:30 PM EDT

Richmond Kickers (Virginia)	2-0	Charleston Battery (South Carolina)
Pat Burke 80'; Richie Williams	Report

University of Richmond Soccer Complex, Richmond, Virginia

==== Semifinals ====
- Greensboro Dynamo 4, Richmond Kickers 1
- Delaware Wizards 4, Raleigh Flyers 2
July 31, 1993
7:30 PM EDT

Greensboro Dynamo (North Carolina)	4–1	Richmond Kickers (Virginia)
Mike Gailey 14', 58', 61'; Jason Haupt 62'	Report	89:30' Robert Ukrop

UNCG Stadium, Greensboro, North Carolina
Attendance: 1,825
July 31, 1993
7:35 PM EDT

Delaware Wizards (Delaware)	4–2	Raleigh Flyers (North Carolina)
Mike McFarland 8'; Darek Bujak 45'; Chris Morgan 62'; Andy Barrett 87'	Report	16' Gregg Berhalter; 23' Toni Siikala

Glasgow High School, Newark, Delaware
Attendance: 3,417

==== Final ====
- Greensboro Dynamo defeated Delaware Wizards (5-0, 2-1)
August 6, 1993
7:30 PM EDT

Greensboro Dynamo (North Carolina)	5–0	Delaware Wizards (Delaware)
David Ulmsten 29' (pen.); Jason Haupt 47', 54' (pen.); Gabe Garcia 76'; Greg Fallon 88'	Report

UNCG Stadium, Greensboro, North Carolina
Attendance: 1,148
August 7, 1993
7:30 PM EDT

Greensboro Dynamo (North Carolina)	2–1 (OT)	Delaware Wizards (Delaware)
Eddie Radwanski 20'; Maher Atta 106'	Report	(red card) 59' Brian Japp; 69' Andy Logar

UNCG Stadium, Greensboro, North Carolina
Attendance: 2,634

=== Southeast Division ===
==== Semifinals ====
- Atlanta Lasers 3, Memphis Jackals 2
- Boca Raton Sabres 4, Coral Springs Kicks 1
August 1, 1993

Coral Springs Kicks	1–4	Boca Raton Sabres
		Jason Rocke; Richie White; Clichy De Gouveia

Mullins Park, Coral Springs, Florida
August 1, 1993

v

==== Final ====
- Atlanta Lasers defeated Boca Raton Sabres (1-0, 3-2)

v

v

=== South Central Division ===
==== Semifinals ====
July 31, 1993

Tulsa Roughnecks (OK)	2-0	San Antonio Pumas (Texas)
Gary Flood 20:24'; Jason Maricle 35:30'	Report

Metro Christian Stadium, Tulsa, Oklahoma
Attendance: 1,826

July 31, 1993

Oklahoma City Slickers	0-4	Dallas Rockets (TX)
Own goal	(Report)	Curtis Partain; 81' Kenny Latham

Taft Stadium, Oklahoma City
Attendance: 1,100

==== Final ====
- Dallas Rockets defeated Tulsa Roughnecks (4-3 (OT), 0-3, 1-0)
August 6, 1993

Dallas Rockets (TX)	4–3 (OT)	Tulsa Roughnecks (OK)
Patrick Krejs 40'; Heath Danford 73'; Scott Fernandez 89'; Kenny Latham 92'	Report	49' Virgil Stevens; 79' Gary Flood; 80'Mike Rawlins

August 8, 1993
7:30 PM EDT

Tulsa Roughnecks (OK)	3–0	Dallas Rockets (TX)
Gary Flood 64:52'; Virgil Stevens 74:41'; Jason Maricle 85:44'	Report

Metro Christian Stadium, Tulsa, Oklahoma
Attendance: 3,107
Mini Game
August 8, 1993
7:30 PM EDT

Tulsa Roughnecks (OK)	0–1	Dallas Rockets (TX)
	Report	11:59' Curtis Partain

Metro Christian Stadium, Tulsa, Oklahoma
Attendance: 3,107

=== Southwest Division ===
==== Semifinals ====
- East Los Angeles Cobras 7, Montclair Standard Falcons 3 ( Ezzy Ihekoronye 4 goals)
- Valley Golden Eagles 5, El Paso Patriots 2

==== Final ====
- East Los Angeles Cobras defeated Valley Golden Eagles (0-6, 3-0, 2-0)

(Ezzy Ihekoronye East Los Angeles Cobras MVP)

=== Pacific Division ===
==== Semifinals ====
- San Jose Hawks 6, Chico Rooks 0
- San Francisco All Blacks 3, Palo Alto Firebirds 2 (OT)

==== Final ====
- San Jose Hawks 3, San Francisco All Blacks 0

== Sizzlin' Six ==
As the defending champion, the Orlando Lions received a bye into the Sizzlin' Six Tournament. The other five teams were the winners of the divisional playoffs. The Sizzlin' Six Tournament began on Thursday, August 12. The three teams in this tournament with the best regular seasons, the Orlando Lions, Greensboro Dynamo and San Jose Hawks, all had 14-2 records. When they all won their games on Thursday, Friday's results became critical to choosing who would go to the championship game. However, all three teams won again on Friday. With all three teams having the same record, the tiebreaker went to goal differential. The Greensboro Dynamo had a +13 goal differential, the Orlando Lions had a +6 and the San Jose Hawks had a +5. This put the Dynamo and Lions in to the final. All games were held at the Municipal Stadium, Daytona, Florida.

=== Thursday ===
August 12, 1993
5:00 PM EST

Greensboro Dynamo (NC)	4-0	East Los Angeles Cobras (CA)

Municipal Stadium, Daytona, Florida

August 12, 1993
7:00 PM (EST)

Orlando Lions (FL)	5-1	Atlanta Lasers (GA)
Dylan Lewis 20'; Sheldon Lee 26' 62'; Tim Geltz 65'; Ian Gill 83'	(Report)	22' OG Ian Gill; (penalty missed) PK Chris Hellenkamp; (red card) 52' Richie Richmond

Municipal Stadium, Daytona, Florida
Attendance: 650

August 12, 1993
9:00 PM EST

San Jose Hawks (CA)	3-1	Dallas Rockets (TX)

Municipal Stadium, Daytona, Florida

=== Friday ===
August 13, 1993
5:00 PM EST 3

San Jose Hawks (CA)	4-1	East Los Angeles Cobras (CA)

Municipal Stadium, Daytona, Florida

August 13, 1993
7:00 PM (EST)

Orlando Lions (FL)	3-1	Dallas Rockets (TX)
Dylan Lewis; Aziz Essaffi 85'; Steve Freeman 89'	(Report)	(red card) 64' A.J. Jones

Municipal Stadium, Daytona, Florida

August 13, 1993
9:00 PM EST

Greensboro Dynamo (NC)	9-0	Atlanta Lasers (GA)

Municipal Stadium, Daytona, Florida

== Final ==
August 15, 1993
7:00 PM (EST)

Orlando Lions (FL)	1-2	Greensboro Dynamo (NC)
Warren Russ (red card) 37'; Sheldon Lee 45'	(Report)	53' Aidan Murphy; 70' Jason Haupt

Municipal Stadium, Daytona, Florida
Attendance: 1,000

== Points leaders ==
Rank	Scorer	Club	GP	Goals	Assists	Points
1	Sheldon Lee	Orlando Lions	16	19	7	45
2	Rahman Alarape	Atlanta Datagraphic Magic	16	15	8	38
3	Milton Cruz	Oklahoma City Slickers	16	14	6	34
4	John Mulrooney	Memphis Jackals	13	13	7	33
5	Ezzy Ihekoronye	East Los Angeles Cobras	10	13	6	32
5	Michael Guerrero	San Antonio Generals	16	11	10	32
7	Scott Wulferdingen	Chico Rooks	13	13	3	29
7	Michael Araujo	Coral Springs Kicks	15	9	11	29
9	Michael Ribera	San Antonio Generals	14	11	6	28
10	Ian Palmer	Tulsa Roughnecks	11	11	2	24
10	Efren Rodarte	El Paso Patriots	12	11	2	24
10	Jerry O'Hara	Palo Alto Firebirds	15	11	2	24

== Honors ==
- MVP: Ed Radwanski
- Goals leader: Sheldon Lee, Orlando Lions (19 goals)
- Points leader: Sheldon Lee, Orlando Lions (45 points)
- Assists leader: Michael Araujo, Coral Springs Kicks (11 assists)
- Goalkeeper of the Year: Vince Da Silva
- Coach of the Year: Mark Dillon
- All League
  - Goalkeeper: Vince Da Silva
  - Defenders: Michael Ditta, David Ulmstein, Derek Van Rheenen
  - Midfielders: Patrick Krehl, Ed Radwanski, Jason Haupt
  - Forwards: Sheldon Lee, David Mackey, Justin Wall, Mike Gailey
