= James Dunn (soccer) =

American soccer player

Personal information
- Date of birth: October 4, 1971 (age 55)
- Place of birth: Olympia, Washington, U.S.
- Height: 6 ft 1 in (1.85 m)
- Position: Defender

Youth career
- 1990: Washington Huskies
- 1991–1993: Seattle Pacific University

Senior career*
Years	Team	Apps	(Gls)
1994–1996	Seattle Sounders		
1997	Carolina Dynamo	16	(0)
1997	Seattle SeaDogs (indoor)		
1998–1999	Florida ThunderCats (indoor)	25	(7)
1999–2001	Wichita Wings (indoor)	80	(30)
- * Club domestic league appearances and goals

James Dunn is an American retired soccer defender who was the 2000 and 2001 National Professional Soccer League Defender of the Year. He also played in the American Professional Soccer League and the Continental Indoor Soccer League.

== Youth ==
Dunn, twin brother of Jason Dunn, graduated from North Thurston High School where he won the 1990 Class AAA High School soccer championship. In 1990, he played a single season with the University of Washington men's soccer team. He then transferred to Seattle Pacific University, playing on the men's soccer team there from 1991 to 1993.

== Professional ==
In 1994, Dunn signed with the Seattle Sounders of the American Professional Soccer League. The Sounders topped the table, but fell to the Colorado Foxes in the first round of the playoffs. Dunn was named Second Team All League. In 1995 and 1996, the Sounders won the league championship. In 1997, the Seattle SeaDogs selected Dunn in the fourth round (twenty-sixth overall) of the Continental Indoor Soccer League draft. He chose to move to the Carolina Dynamo instead. However, at the end of the 1997 A-League season, in which the Dynamo fell to the Milwaukee Rampage in the championship, Dunn joined the SeaDogs. The SeaDogs won the CISL championship, giving Dunn his third title in four seasons. In 1998, Dunn signed with the Florida ThunderCats of the National Professional Soccer League.

On March 15, 1999, the Thundercats sent Dunn to the Wichita Wings in exchange for Larry Inlow and Kevin Law. He played seven games for the Wings at the end of the season. In 2000 and 2001, Dunn was the NPSL Defender of the Year. The Wings folded in 2001.
