= Sheldon Lee =

Sheldon Lee may refer to:

- Sheldon Lee (politician) (1933–2025), Canadian politician
- Sheldon Lee (footballer), English football forward
- Sheldon Lee (Teenage Robot), a fictional character in My Life as a Teenage Robot

== See also ==
- Sheldon Lee Glashow (born 1932), American theoretical physicist
