= Narciso Zazueta =

Mexican footballer (born 1968)

Personal information
- Full name: Narciso Alberto Zazueta Catalan
- Date of birth: October 29, 1968 (age 58)
- Place of birth: Culiacán, Sinaloa, Mexico
- Height: 5 ft 10 in (1.78 m)
- Positions: Defender; forward

Senior career*
Years	Team	Apps	(Gls)
- Hermisillo Seris
1992–1994	Tucson Amigos		
1996–1997	Inter Tijuana		
- * Club domestic league appearances and goals

Narciso “Tanque” Zazueta is a retired Mexican footballer who played in both the United States and Mexico.

Zazueta played for Hermisillo Seris, a third division club in Mexico. In 1992, he joined the Tucson Amigos halfway through the 1992 United States Interregional Soccer League season. The Amigos were 1–6 at the time, but the addition of Zazueta and John Olu–Molomo led to the Amigos making the playoffs and going to the championship game where they lost to the Palo Alto Firebirds. Zazueta was All League. Zazueta continued to play for the Amigos until 1994, driving up from his home in Hermisillo, Mexico for practice and games. In July 1994, he joined an unknown team in the Mexican Second Division. He played for Inter Tijuana from 1996 to 1997 in Primera División A, Group II.
