= Dick McCormick =

American soccer player and coach

Personal information
- Date of birth: September 9, 1968 (age 58)
- Place of birth: Seattle, Washington, U.S.
- Height: 5 ft 9 in (1.75 m)
- Position: Midfielder

College career
Years	Team	Apps	(Gls)
1987–1988	Warner Pacific Knights		

Senior career*
Years	Team	Apps	(Gls)
1988–1990	Portland Timbers		
1989–1991	Tacoma Stars (indoor)	76	(6)
1992–1994	Canton Invaders (indoor)	57	(25)
1993	Portland Pride (indoor)	28	(27)
1994–1996	Seattle Sounders	52	(6)
1997	Seattle SeaDogs (indoor)	28	(31)
1998	Seattle Sounders	15	(4)
1998–1999	Florida ThunderCats (indoor)	8	(5)
2000–2002	Seattle Sounders	34	(1)

Managerial career
- 2002–c. 2005: Seattle Sounders (assistant)
- 2002–2005: Seattle Sounders Women
- * Club domestic league appearances and goals

Dick McCormick (born September 9, 1968) is an American former soccer player and current youth soccer coach. McCormick played as a midfielder in six indoor and outdoor leagues over his fourteen-year professional career. He has served as an assistant coach with the Seattle Sounders and head coach of the Sounders W-League women's team in the 2000s. He is currently the Director of Coaching with the Crossfire Premier soccer club.

== High school and college ==
McCormick grew up in the Capitol Hill neighborhood of Seattle. He attended Interlake High School where he was a four-year soccer letterman. He then attended Warner Pacific College, playing soccer in 1987 and 1988.

== Professional ==
In the summer of 1988, McCormick spent the collegiate off season with the semi-professional F.C. Portland of the Western Soccer Alliance. When he left college after the 1988 fall collegiate season, he rejoined the team which had become a fully professional team known as the Portland Timbers. In the fall of 1989, McCormick also signed with the Tacoma Stars of the Major Indoor Soccer League (MISL). Over the next two years, he would alternate between these two teams, playing outdoor with the Timbers in 1990 and indoor with the Stars in 1990–1991. In 1992, McCormick signed with the Canton Invaders of the indoor National Professional Soccer League (NPSL). He played two winter indoor seasons with the Invaders (1992–1993 and 1993–1994). In the summer of 1993, he played with the Portland Pride of the Continental Indoor Soccer League (CISL). In 1994, McCormick signed with the expansion Seattle Sounders of the American Professional Soccer League. He spent three seasons with the Sounders, then moved to the Seattle SeaDogs of the CISL for the summer of 1997. The SeaDogs won the championship, then folded. McCormick returned to the Sounders for the 1998 season, but moved to the Florida ThunderCats of the NPSL. The ThunderCats lasted only one season and McCormick signed with the Sounders as a free agent in April 2000.

== Coaching ==
McCormick began coaching on the youth soccer level with the Crossfire Premier soccer club in 1997. In February 2002, he was hired as an assistant coach with the Seattle Sounders and in July 2002, he became the head coach of the Seattle Sounders Saints, the Sounders women's team which competes in the W-League. He also coached a Boys Developmental team, a B-U13 State Cup Champion team, a G-U15 State Cup Champion team, and a G-U17 State Cup Quarter finalist team for Crossfire. In 2009, his G-U17 team won both state and region IV championships and competed at nationals in Boston as one of the top 6 teams in the nation. In 2010, his B-U14 team won the State Championship, then the Regional Championship, and then finished their journey in the finals of the National Championship where they lost.
