= Juan de la O =

Mexican footballer (born 1966)

Personal information
- Full name: Juan de la O Flores
- Date of birth: July 24, 1966 (age 60)
- Place of birth: Mexico City, Mexico
- Height: 6 ft 0 in (1.83 m)
- Position: Goalkeeper

Senior career*
Years	Team	Apps	(Gls)
1995	Mexico Toros (indoor)	17	(0)
1996–1997	Seattle SeaDogs (indoor)		
1997–1998	Philadelphia KiXX (indoor)	13	(0)
1998	Portland Pythons (indoor)		
1998–1999	Florida ThunderCats (indoor)	19	(0)
1999	Houston Hotshots (indoor)		
2000	Arizona Thunder (indoor)	22	(0)
2001	Sacramento Knights (indoor)	20	(0)
- * Club domestic league appearances and goals

Juan de la O (born July 24, 1966) is a Mexican indoor soccer goalkeeper who played in several U.S. indoor leagues. He was the 1997 Continental Indoor Soccer League Goalkeeper of the Year.

De La O began his indoor career in the Mexican indoor soccer leagues. In 1995, he played for the Mexico Toros of the Continental Indoor Soccer League. The team lasted only that one season before folding and the Seattle SeaDogs selected De La O in the CISL dispersal draft. He played the next two seasons with the SeaDogs. He was the 1996 CISL Goalkeeper of the Year. In 1997, the SeaDogs won the CISL championships as De La O was named the Championship Series MVP. When the CISL collapsed at the end of the 1997 season, D La O held the league record for lowest goals against average. Where the CISL had played a summer indoor season, the National Professional Soccer League played a winter indoor season. De La O therefore, moved to the Philadelphia KiXX of the NPSL in the fall of 1997. In 1998, several ex-CISL formed a new league, named the Premier Soccer Alliance. De La O signed with the Portland Pythons for the 1998 PSA season but was back in the NPSL that fall, this time with the Florida ThunderCats. In 1999, he played for the Houston Hotshots in the PSA, now known as the World Indoor Soccer League. He moved again for the 2000 WISL season, this time playing for the Arizona Thunder. He recorded the first two shutouts in WISL history. It appears he may have finished his U.S. career in 2001 with the Sacramento Knights. However, he may have continued to play in Mexico. BiChampion with "El Combinado" at ITAM (2017–2018).
