= Sergio Mora (disambiguation) =

Sergio Mora is an American boxer.

Sergio Mora may also refer to:

- Sergio Mora (born 1942), American soccer forward
- Sergio Mora (born 1979), Spanish football midfielder
