= Seattle SeaDogs =

Defunct American indoor soccer team

- Full name: Seattle SeaDogs
- Founded: 1993
- Dissolved: 1997
- Stadium: Seattle Center Arena; KeyArena; Seattle, Washington
- Capacity: 4,055 (Seattle Center); 14,545 (KeyArena)
- Manager: Fernando Clavijo (1994–1997)
- League: Continental Indoor Soccer League
- 1997: League: 1st Playoffs: Champions

The Seattle SeaDogs were an indoor soccer team based in Seattle, Washington, United States. They played in the Continental Indoor Soccer League (CISL) from 1995 to 1997 with home games at Mercer Arena and KeyArena. The team were owned by the Ackerley Group, who also operated the Seattle SuperSonics, and were announced in 1993 amid a wave of new professional soccer teams in the Seattle metropolitan area.

The SeaDogs, coached by Fernando Clavijo, had poor attendance during the first two seasons and failed to reach the playoffs, finishing in 1996 as the worst team in the CISL. The team then amassed the best regular season record in the league during the 1997 season and went undefeated during the playoffs to win their first CISL Championship. The league folded at the end of the season and the SeaDogs were dissolved.

== History ==
=== First seasons ===
On November 16, 1993, the Continental Indoor Soccer League (CISL) awarded an expansion franchise to the Ackerley Group, owner of the Seattle SuperSonics of the National Basketball Association. The region previously had other indoor teams, including the Tacoma Stars of the defunct Major Indoor Soccer League; a CISL bid for a Tacoma team had failed to garner support. The team's name, the SeaDogs, was announced in November 1994 alongside the unveiling of head coach Fernando Clavijo, a member of the United States national team who played in the 1994 FIFA World Cup. The team's mascot, a purple dog named "Salty", was named in a later fan contest. The SeaDogs were among several professional soccer teams in the Seattle area that had begun to play in the mid-1990s, including the outdoor Seattle Sounders and Everett BigFoot.

The SeaDogs held an open scrimmage prior to the regular season at their temporary home, Seattle Center Arena, that drew 98 spectators. The team made their debut on June 23, 1995, where they defeated the San Jose Grizzlies 6–5 in sudden-death overtime in front of 3,529 spectators in Seattle. They had poor attendance, with an average crowd of under 2,000 by early August, blamed in part due to competition from other professional soccer teams in the area. The SeaDogs finished their inaugural season with a 12–16 record and missed the playoffs; during the offseason, they lost top scorer Jean Harbor to the Colorado Rapids and key forward Michael Collins to the Sacramento Knights. Harbor later returned to the team on loan from the Rapids.

The team moved to KeyArena for the 1996 season and had an average attendance of 3,812—ninth of eleven teams in the CISL and 26 percent of the arena's capacity. The SeaDogs and Sounders, who played at nearby Memorial Stadium, had scheduled overlapping games on several nights that affected attendance figures for both teams. The SeaDogs finished last in the Western Division with a 10–18 record and a league-low 143 goals scored, but the team earned a franchise-record 11–5 victory against the Detroit Neon in their final match of the season. New signing Juan de la O won the CISL Goalkeeper of the Year Award for his performances, which included a league-low 148 goals allowed. Seattle made several acquisitions late in the season and into the offseason, including John Olu-Molomo in a trade from the San Diego Sockers and ex-Sounders players Bill Crook and Dick McCormick.

=== Championship and folding ===
The SeaDogs began their 1997 season with a franchise-best seven consecutive wins, including five road games to open the year; Harbor led the team in scoring, followed by Olu-Molomo prior to an injury to his right shoulder. They then lost several matches and dropped from the top of the Western Division standings but regained first place in late August with a 14–5 record. The SeaDogs finished the regular season with 21 wins and 7 losses—the best record in the league—and set several team records. They also drew an average of 2,769 spectators at KeyArena.

The team were seeded in the Western semifinals against the fourth-place Portland Pride, who hosted the first leg and held to a 2–2 draw at halftime; the SeaDogs scored six goals in the second half to win 8–2. Seattle completed a two-game sweep of Portland with a 6–5 victory at KeyArena with two last-minute goals to avoid a deciding mini-game round. The SeaDogs then opened the Western Final against the Sacramento Knights with a 6–2 away victory and played the following night at KeyArena. The Knights had a 2–0 lead at halftime, but four goals from the hosts gave Seattle a 4–3 victory and a berth in the CISL Championship against the Houston Hotshots, the 1996 runners-up.

The SeaDogs conceded four goals in the first two quarters of the championship's first game at KeyArena, played in front of 6,530, but rallied with three goals before halftime. An additional two goals from the hosts forced a sudden death overtime period, during which Olu-Molomo scored within two minutes to win the game 6–5 for Seattle. The SeaDogs clinched their first CISL Championship with a 7–1 win at The Summit in Houston the following night with two goals from McCormick. The title finished a "worst-to-first" turnaround for the SeaDogs, who had the league's worst record in 1996 and were undefeated in the playoffs—a league first. Juan de la O was named the championship's most valuable player, having made 15 saves in the second game.

The CISL folded following the departure of several teams at the end of the 1997 season; Seattle was one of three teams to commit to returning in 1998. Several teams moved to other indoor soccer leagues, but the SeaDogs elected to remain independent as its ownership explored various options. In June 1998, Clavijo accepted an offer to become head coach of the Florida ThunderCats of the National Professional Soccer League (NPSL).

== Arena ==
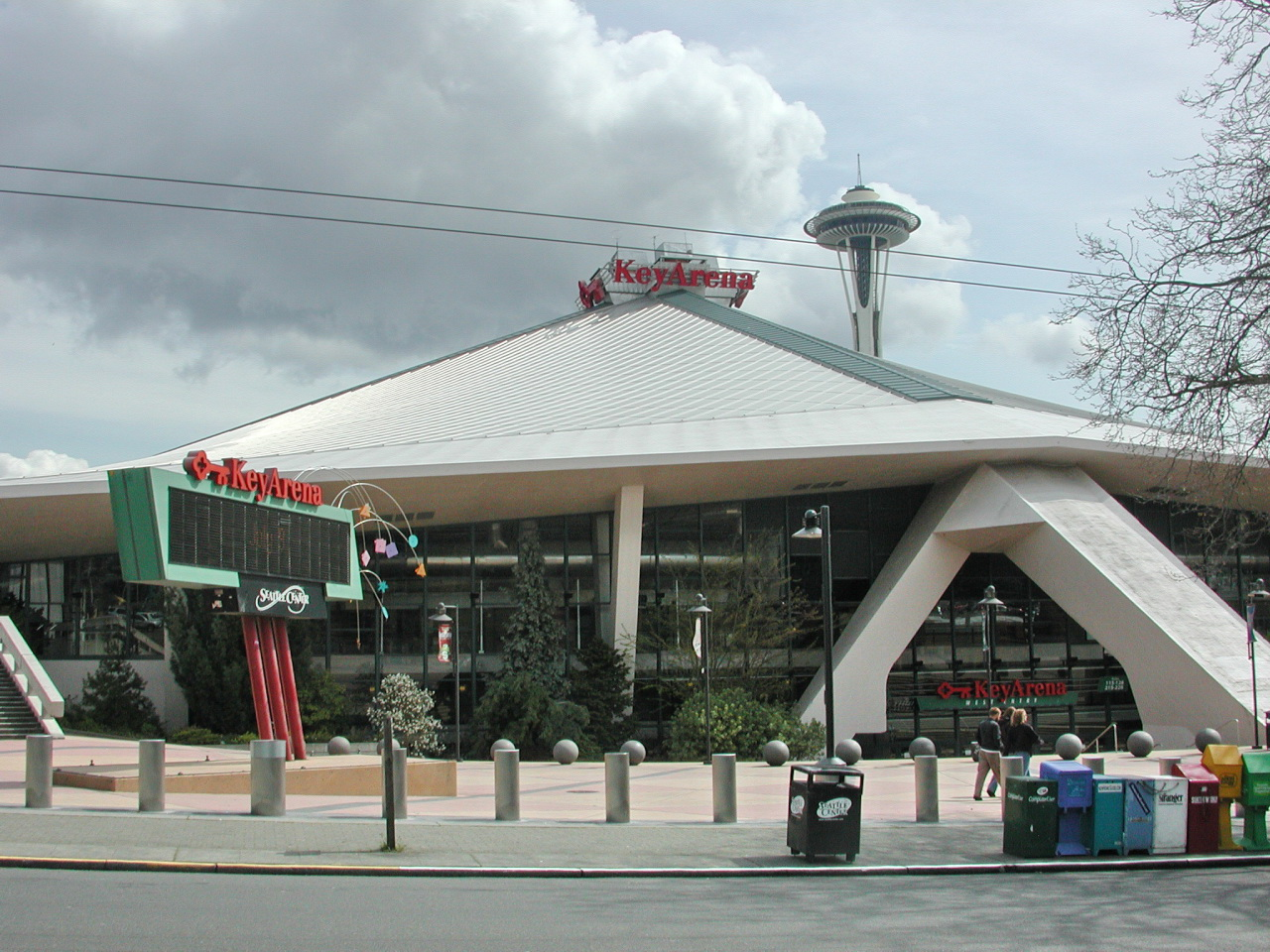
KeyArena, the home venue of the Seattle SeaDogs from 1996 to 1997

The SeaDogs signed a three-year lease agreement with the Seattle city government to use two public facilities: Seattle Center Arena (now known as Mercer Arena) in 1995 and KeyArena from 1996 to 1997. Both arenas were located on the grounds of the Seattle Center; due to the ongoing redevelopment of Seattle Center Coliseum, its successor KeyArena was unavailable for the opening season. Seattle Center Arena had 4,055 seats, while KeyArena had a capacity of 14,545 seats.

== Ownership and management ==
Like several other teams in the CISL, the SeaDogs shared ownership with a National Basketball Association team in the same market. The Ackerley Group, headed by media magnate Barry Ackerley, owned the SeaDogs and the SuperSonics. The teams were overseen by Full House Sports and Entertainment, a marketing subsidiary of the group. Home SeaDogs matches were broadcast on radio station KJR AM, also owned by the Ackerley Group, with play-by-play commentary by John Lynch.

Fernando Clavijo was head coach of the SeaDogs in all three of their seasons. Brian Schmetzer was an assistant coach and player; he later took over the Seattle Sounders of the USL First Division and their Major League Soccer incarnation.

== Year-by-year ==
Seattle SeaDogs seasons
Year	Record	Regular season	Playoffs	Avg. attendance
1995	12–16	4th, Western	Did not qualify	2,341
1996	11–17	4th, Western	Did not qualify	3,812
1997	21–7	1st, Western	Champions	2,769
Total	44–40	—	—	2,974

== Honors ==
CISL Championship

- Winners: 1997

CISL Goalkeeper of the Year

- 1996 – Juan de la O
- 1997 – Juan de la O

CISL Coach of the Year

- 1997 – Fernando Clavijo

CISL Championship Series MVP

- 1997 – Juan de la O

All-CISL First Team

- 1997 – Juan de la O (GK), John Olu-Molomo (FW)

CISL All Star Game MVP

- 1997 – Jean Harbor

== Players ==
The SeaDogs primarily used American players, including several who had played for the Sounders and the indoor Tacoma Stars. Among them were player–coach Brian Schmetzer, top goalscorer Jean Harbor, and forward John Olu-Molomo. Goalkeeper Juan de la O was named CISL Goalkeeper of the Year in 1996 and 1997.

=== 1997 roster ===
As of June 1997

Note: Flags indicate national team as defined under FIFA eligibility rules; some limited exceptions apply. Players may hold more than one non-FIFA nationality.

No.	Pos.	Nation	Player
0	GK	(Mexico) MEX	Juan de la O
1	GK	(United States) USA	Nat Gonazlez
2	DF	(United States) USA	Todd Woodhouse
3	MF	(United States) USA	Tom Bialek
4	MF	(United States) USA	Todd Stauber
5	DF	(United States) USA	Seth Spidahl
6	DF	(United States) USA	Dave Mattson
7	MF	(United States) USA	Dick McCormick
8	DF/MF	(Spain) ESP	Camilo Casal
9	MF	(United States) USA	Bruce Broughton
10	FW	(United States) USA	John Olu-Molomo
11	MF/FW	(United States) USA	Shane Decker

No.	Pos.	Nation	Player
12	DF	(United States) USA	John Purtteman
13	MF/FW	(United States) USA	David Wheeler
14	FW	(United States) USA	Jason Dunn
15	MF/FW	(United States) USA	Victor Bychov
17	DF	(United States) USA	Bill Crook
18	FW	(United States) USA	Jean Harbor
19	MF	(United States) USA	Shannon Murray
20	MF	(Mexico) MEX	Rafael Garcia
21	DF	(Argentina) ARG	Gaston Pernia
22	MF/FW	(Argentina) ARG	Marcelo Fontana
30	MF	(United States) USA	Tim Babcock
