= Paul Dougherty (footballer) =

English footballer (born 1966)

Personal information
- Date of birth: 12 May 1966 (age 60)
- Place of birth: Leamington Spa, England
- Positions: Forward; midfielder

Senior career*
Years	Team	Apps	(Gls)
1984–1987	Wolverhampton Wanderers	41	(3)
1985	→Torquay United (loan)	5	(0)
1987–1989	San Diego Sockers (indoor)	117	(60)
1988	San Diego Nomads	0	(0)
1989–1990	Baltimore Blast (indoor)	41	(13)
1990	Orlando Lions		
1990	Cheltenham Town	1	(0)
1990–1992	San Diego Sockers (indoor)	87	(80)
1991	Miami Freedom	5	(1)
1991	Fort Lauderdale Strikers	11	(6)
1992–1996	Buffalo Blizzard (indoor)	149	(221)
1993	→ Tampa Bay Rowdies (loan)	22	(8)
1995	Montreal Impact	24	(10)
1996–1997	Houston Hotshots (indoor)	55	(86)
1998	MetroStars	16	(3)
1998–1999	Tampa Bay Mutiny	23	(3)
1999	Chicago Fire	11	(0)
1999	→ Charleston Battery (loan)	4	(0)
2000	Colorado Rapids	24	(0)
2001	Pittsburgh Riverhounds	11	(3)
2004–2005	San Diego Sockers (indoor)	14	(7)

Managerial career
- 2001: San Diego Flash (assistant)
- 2002–: La Jolla Nomads
- 2002–08: UC San Diego (assistant)
- 2009–: San Diego WFC SeaLions
- * Club domestic league appearances and goals as of 17:47, 24 February 2007 (UTC)

Paul Dougherty (born 12 May 1966) is an English former professional soccer player and soccer coach who began his career with Wolverhampton Wanderers in England. He then moved to the United States where he became a journeyman player, bouncing through sixteen teams in multiple indoor and outdoor leagues.

He is currently the head coach of the San Diego WFC SeaLions, who play in the Women's Premier Soccer League.

== English football league ==
Dougherty began his career when he signed as an apprentice with English First Division club Wolverhampton Wanderers at age 16. He made his league debut while still an apprentice during the 1983/84 season that saw the club lose their top flight status. He made the most appearances of his Wolves career during the following season, which also saw him spend time on loan at Torquay United during February 1985.

He failed to establish himself as a regular choice though, and played only sporadically over the next two years as the club continued to slide down the divisions under a succession of managers. At the end of the 1986/87 season, he moved to the US to further his career there, where he would remain employed as a player for the next eighteen years. He did however make a very brief (1 game) return to English football playing for Cheltenham Town in October 1990.

== Indoor soccer ==
In the fall of 1986, the San Diego Sockers began working the paperwork to allow Dougherty to try out with the team. Dougherty arrived in California in January 1987 and began training with the Sockers' reserve team. On 11 February 1987, the Sockers traded Gary Collier to the Kansas City Comets in exchange for a foreign player visa. On 25 February 1987, Dougherty moved up to the Sockers' first team. In addition to playing for the Sockers, he later also enrolled at San Diego State University. Whereas his lack of height hindered his development as an outdoor player, it served him in good stead in the indoor game which prized quickness and agility oversize and stamina. Over the next five years, he earned four titles as the Sockers dominated indoor soccer. In 1989, he was named the "Championship Series Unsung Hero" as the Sockers knocked off the Baltimore Blast for the title. In August 1989, Dougherty became a free agent and when the Baltimore Blast made him an offer, the Sockers decided not to match it. On 2 September 1989, he signed with the Blast. In 1990, the Blast and Sockers again met in the championship series, this time with Dougherty playing for Baltimore, but the Sockers again defeated the Blast. He became a free agent and returned to England, where he received interest from only one fourth-division team. He then returned to the United States where he signed with the San Diego Sockers on 17 October 1990. When the Sockers moved to the Continental Indoor Soccer League (CISL) in 1992, Dougherty left the team and signed with the Buffalo Blizzard of the National Professional Soccer League (NPSL). During his two stints with the Sockers, Dougherty had played 204 games and scored 104 goals. At the time, the NPSL was the higher paying of the two indoor leagues. Dougherty remained with the Blizzard for three seasons, from 1992 to 1996. At the completion of the 1995–1996 NPSL season, Dougherty jumped both teams and leagues. On 1 May 1996, he signed with the Houston Hotshots of CISL. That season he was the CISL third leading scorer while the Hotshots went to the championship series, only to fall to the Monterrey La Raza. Dougherty was named All-CISL. The next season, the Hotshots did not go so far in the playoffs, but Dougherty led the league in scoring, garnering both All CISL and CISL MVP honors. The CISL folded at the end of the 1997, leading Dougherty to move to Major League Soccer (MLS)

== Outdoor minor leagues ==
By the time Dougherty moved to MLS, he was already a veteran of several outdoor US teams. While he made his name with the indoor game, he also was a consistent performer outdoors. In July 1988, while in San Diego with the Sockers, Dougherty signed with the San Diego Nomads as the team prepared for the Western Soccer Alliance playoffs. He played only one play-off games as the San Jose Earthquakes eliminated the Nomads in penalty kicks. Then in 1990, he spent the outdoor season with the Orlando Lions in the American Professional Soccer League (APSL) which had been formed that year by the merger of the WSA and east coast American Soccer League. On 12 June 1991, he signed with the Miami Freedom of the APSL. On 1 July 1991, the Freedom released Dougherty and seven other players in a bid to maintain financial solvency. He signed with the Fort Lauderdale Strikers the next day. While he sat out the 1992 APSL season, instead spending time with two of his indoor clubs, he returned to the APSL in 1993, this time on loan from the Blizzard to the Tampa Bay Rowdies. That season was one of his best as he bagged eight goals in twenty-two games and a spot on the APSL All Star team. Once again, he took time off from the outdoor game to devote himself to indoor soccer. However, in 1995 he signed with the Montreal Impact of A-League, successor to the APSL. He once again earned All Star honors.

== MLS ==
After the CISL folded at the end of 1997, Dougherty began pursuing full-time employment in an outdoor league. On 3 February 1998, the MetroStars of Major League Soccer (MLS) signed Dougherty. He played sixteen games that season, before the MetroStars traded him to the Tampa Bay Mutiny for Mike Duhaney in July. Dougherty began the 1999 season with the Mutiny but was traded on 2 August 1999 with Sam George and a draft pick to the Chicago Fire for Ritchie Kotschau and Manny Lagos. When Dougherty failed to produce with Chicago, they sent him on loan to the Charleston Battery of the USL First Division. In March 2000, Dougherty was able to add another team to his resume, having been a member of it for only a few hours. The Fire released Dougherty on 15 March 2000. He was then selected by the New England Revolution the next day in the Waiver Draft. The Revs then turned around and traded Dougherty to the Colorado Rapids in exchange for a fifth round pick in the upcoming Super Draft. Dougherty spent the 2000 season with the Rapids, but failed to score in twenty-four games and on 31 October 2000 he announced his retirement.

== Minor leagues ==
Dougherty didn't stay retired for long. Kai Haaskivi, a former indoor teammate of Dougherty's, was coaching the Pittsburgh Riverhounds of the USL A-League. The Riverhounds needed some added offensive production heading into the post season as well as for upcoming Open Cup games. Dougherty signed with the Riverhounds on 20 July 2001. Haaskivi's gamble paid off as Dougherty provided instant offence, including a goal in the Open Cup quarterfinal match against his old team, the Chicago Fire. At the end of the season the Riverhounds released Dougherty and he moved back to San Diego to pursue a coaching career. However, Dougherty was unable to call it quits to playing and on 5 February 2004, he rejoined the San Diego Sockers for one last indoor season. The Sockers folded midway through the season.

== Coaching ==
When the Riverhounds released Dougherty, he returned to San Diego where he became an assistant coach with the San Diego Flash of the USL A League. In 2002, he left the Flash and joined the staff of the La Jolla Nomads Soccer Club. This is significant in that Dougherty had begun his US outdoor career fourteen years earlier with the Nomads senior team, the San Diego Nomads. In 2004, he took the Nomads U-15 team to the US national championship only to have his boys fall, 5–4, to the Greater Boston Bolts. In addition to coaching with the Nomads, he became an assistant coach with the UC San Diego men's team as well as the Manchester Soccer Club and Rancho Santa Fe Attack.
