= Craig Huft =

American soccer player

Personal information
- Date of birth: May 8, 1966 (age 60)
- Place of birth: Livermore, California, U.S.
- Height: 5 ft 6 in (1.68 m)
- Positions: Forward; midfielder

College career
Years	Team	Apps	(Gls)
1986	Ohlone Renegades		
1987–1989	Cal State East Bay Pioneers		

Senior career*
Years	Team	Apps	(Gls)
1990	Salt Lake Sting	18	(1)
1992	Palo Alto Firebirds	20	(7)
1992	Milwaukee Wave (indoor)	6	(3)
1993–2001	Sacramento Knights (indoor)	177	(50)
- * Club domestic league appearances and goals

Craig Huft is an American retired soccer player who played professionally in the American Professional Soccer League, National Professional Soccer League and Continental Indoor Soccer League. He was 1992 USISL All League.

In 1986, Huft began his collegiate career at Ohlone College. He then transferred to Cal State Hayward where he played from 1987 to 1989. In 1988, he was NCAC Second Team All-Conference and in 1989 he was NSCAA First Team All-West Region. He was also captain of the 1989 team that went to the NCAA Division II Final Four in Greensboro, North Carolina. In 1990, Huft turned professional with the Salt Lake Sting of the American Professional Soccer League. In 1992, he played for the Palo Alto Firebirds in the USISL. The Firebirds won the league championship and Huft was named First Team All League. In November 1992, Huft signed with the Milwaukee Wave of the National Professional Soccer League. On December 4, 1992, the Wave released Huft after he played only six games, scoring three goals. In 1993, he signed with the Sacramento Knights of the Continental Indoor Soccer League. Huft remained with the Knights until the team ceased operations in 2001. Over Huft's nine seasons with the Knights, the team played in the Premier Soccer Alliance and the World Indoor Soccer League.
