= Michael Araujo =

South African soccer player

Personal information
- Date of birth: 22 May 1968 (age 58)
- Place of birth: South Africa
- Height: 5 ft 7 in (1.70 m)
- Positions: Midfielder; forward

Team information
- Current team: Team Boca (director of coaching)

Youth career
- 1978–1985: Arcadia Shepherds
- 1986–1988: College of Boca Raton

Senior career*
| Years | Team | Apps | (Gls) |
| 1988-89 | Arcadia Shepherds | 20 | (5) |
| 1990-1991 | Montreal Supra | 27 | (4) |
| 1992 | Boca Raton Sabres | 20 | (9) |
| 1993 | Coral Springs Kicks | 15 | (9) |
| 1993–1994 | Glenavon | 32 | (6) |
| 1995 | Atlanta Ruckus | 23 | (4) |
| 1995–1996 | Cincinnati Silverbacks (indoor) | 55 | (62) |
| 1997 | Orlando Sundogs | 4 | (1) |
| 1997 | Sacramento Knights (indoor) | 24 | (16) |
| 1998–2000 | SuperSport United | 40 | (8) |
| Total | | 260 | (124) |

Managerial career
- 2002–Current: Team Boca (director of coaching)
- * Club domestic league appearances and goals

Michael Araujo is a retired South African soccer player who played professionally in South Africa, the United States, Canada and Ireland.

== Player ==
=== Club career ===
Araujo's parents moved from Portugal to South Africa where he was born. In 1986, Araujo entered the College of Boca Raton, now known as Lynn University. He played two seasons of NAIA soccer at the College Boca Raton, winning the 1987 NAIA national men's soccer championship and received offensive MVP of the tournament. Araujo was also a 1987 NAIA All American. He finished his degree at Florida Atlantic University. In 1990, Roy Wiggemansen, former coach of Boca Raton, brought Araujo into the Montreal Supra which Wiggemansen now coached. Araujo was a Canadian Soccer League All Star midfielder that year. , In 1991-92, he played a for the Boca Raton Sabres in the USISL. On 30 March 1993, Araujo became one of the first players signed by the Coral Springs Kicks. He led the USISL in assists that season. In the fall of 1993, Araujo moved to Northern Ireland to play for Glenavon F.C.where he helped the team qualify for the early rounds of the European Champions League. In 1995, he played for the Atlanta Ruckus in the A-Leaguewhere he helped take the team all the way to the National A League championship vs the Seattle Sounders. He moved indoors in the fall of 1995 with the Cincinnati Silverbacks of the National Professional Soccer League, playing two seasons with the Silverbacks. In the spring of 1997, Araujo played four games for the Orlando Sundogs of the USISL before signing with the Sacramento Knights of the Continental Indoor Soccer League for the summer indoor season. In 1998, Araujo moved back to South Africa to join SuperSport United where he won the 1999 Bob Save Superbowl trophy and received the MVP award for the final. Araujo lives and plays for amateur clubs in the United States since retiring from Professional soccer.. In 2007, he played for the Fox and Hounds in the Gold Coast Soccer League Over 30 Division. In 2008, he was with Fort Lauderdale in the Florida Elite Soccer League.

=== International ===
Araujo played/captained the South African youth national team(1983&1984).

== Coach ==
Director of coaching for Team Boca boys soccer program (2002–present).
