= Bocabec Cove, New Brunswick =

Bocabec Cove
- Unincorporated community
- Location within New Brunswick.
- Coordinates: 45°10′09″N 67°00′58″W
- Country: Canada
- Province: New Brunswick
- County: Charlotte
- Parish: Saint Patrick
- Electoral Districts Federal: New Brunswick Southwest
- Provincial: Charlotte-The Isles

Government
  - Type: Local service district
- Time zone: UTC-4 (AST)
  - Summer (DST): UTC-3 (ADT)
- Postal code(s): E5B
- Area code: 506
- Highways: Route 127

Bocabec Cove is a community in Saint Patrick Parish, Charlotte County in the Canadian province of New Brunswick.

== See also ==
- List of communities in New Brunswick
