= Tim McCarty =

American football coach

Current position
- Title: Head coach
- Team: Western Heights HS (OK)

Playing career
- 1983: Fort Hays State
- Position: Defensive lineman

Coaching career (HC unless noted)
- 1984: Fort Hays State (SA)
- 1985: Russell HS (KS)
- 1986: Hays HS (KS)
- 1987: Kansas (GA)
- 1988: Middle Tennessee (TE)
- 1989: Shawnee Mission North HS (KS)
- 1990–1993: Dodge City (OC)
- 1994–1997: Southwest Baptist (OC/OL)
- 1999: Greenville (OL)
- 1999–2003: Tabor
- 2004–2005: East Central
- 2006–2008: Kansas State (assistant HC)
- 2009–2017: East Central
- ?–present: Western Heights HS (OK)

Head coaching record
- Overall: 71–94 (college)
- Tournaments: 0–1 (NAIA playoffs)

Accomplishments and honors

Championships
- 1 LSC North Division (2010)

Tim McCarty is an American football coach and former player. He is the head football coach at Western Heights High School in Oklahoma City. McCarty served two stints as the head football coach at East Central University in Ada, Oklahoma, from 2004 to 2005 and 2009 to 2017. From 1999 to 2003, he was the head football coach at Tabor College in Hillsboro, Kansas. His two tenures at East Central were separated by a three-year stint at the assistant head football coach at Kansas State University.

== Playing career ==
McCarty prepped at Concordia Junior-Senior High School in Concordia, Kansas and is a 1985 graduate of Fort Hays State University. He was a defensive lineman and served as a team captain for the 1983 squad that produced an 8–3 record. McCarty earned a master's of education in administration from Middle Tennessee State University in 1994.

== Coaching career ==
McCarty, a native Kansan, became Kansas State assistant coach on December 8, 2005 and was among head coach Ron Prince's first hires at Kansas State. He held that position from 2006 until 2008.

McCarty came to Kansas State after a two-year stint as the head coach at East Central University in Ada, Oklahoma. While at East Central, McCarty guided the Tigers to a 9–11 record, including a 6–4 finish in his first season in 2004 after being picked to finish last in the Lone Star Conference’s North Division that year.

Prior to East Central, McCarty coached Tabor College to a National Association of Intercollegiate Athletics (NAIA) power from the ground up. In his first season at Tabor in 1999, the Bluejays had just 14 players in the program and struggled through a 0–10 campaign. McCarty guided Tabor to a 3–7 record in 2000, a 5–5 mark in 2001, a 6–4 ledger in 2002 and ultimately a 9–2 record in 2003 that saw the Bluejays achieve a No. 15 national ranking and the program's first berth in the NAIA playoffs.

== Personal life ==
McCarty is married to the former Jillian Bailey of Brentwood, Tennessee. The couple have two daughters.

== Head coaching record ==
=== College ===
Year	Team	Overall	Conference	Standing	Bowl/playoffs	NAIA^{#}
Tabor Bluejays (Kansas Collegiate Athletic Conference) (1999–2003)
1999	Tabor	0–10	0–8	9th		
2000	Tabor	3–7	3–6	T–7th		
2001	Tabor	5–5	4–5	T–6th		
2002	Tabor	6–4	5–4	T–3rd		
2003	Tabor	9–2	8–1	2nd	L NAIA First Round	17
Tabor:		23–28	20–24			
East Central Tigers (Lone Star Conference) (2004–2005)
2004	East Central	6–4	5–4 / 3–2	T–6th / T–3rd (North)		
2005	East Central	3–7	2–7 / 2–3	T–11th / T–3rd (North)		
East Central Tigers (Lone Star Conference) (2009–2010)
2009	East Central	0–11	0–10 / 0–5	13th / 6th (North)		
2010	East Central	5–6	5–5 / 5–1	T–6th / T–1st (North)		
East Central Tigers (Great American Conference) (2011–2017)
2011	East Central	8–3	6–2	3rd		
2012	East Central	6–5	4–4	T–4th		
2013	East Central	5–5	5–5	T–6th		
2014	East Central	6–5	6–4	T–4th	L C.H.A.M.P.S. Heart of Texas Bowl	
2015	East Central	6–5	6–5	6th		
2016	East Central	1–10	1–10	12th		
2017	East Central	2–9	2–9	T–11th		
East Central:		48–66	42–61			
Total:		71–94				
National championship Conference title Conference division title or championship game berth
^{#}Rankings from final NAIA Coaches' Poll.
