= John Olu-Molomo =

Nigerian footballer (born 1968)

Personal information
- Date of birth: July 20, 1968 (age 58)
- Place of birth: Ibadan, Nigeria
- Height: 6 ft 0 in (1.83 m)
- Positions: Forward; midfielder

Youth career
- 1990: U.S. International University

Senior career*
| Years | Team | Apps | (Gls) |
| 1992 | Tucson Amigos | | |
| 1994–1996 | San Diego Sockers (indoor) | 62 | (91) |
| 1996–1997 | Seattle SeaDogs (indoor) | 39 | (50) |
| 1997–1998 | Philadelphia KiXX (indoor) | 33 | (29) |
| 1998–1999 | Florida Thundercats (indoor) | 23 | (28) |
| 1999 | Philadelphia KiXX (indoor) | 8 | (3) |
| 1999 | Dallas Sidekicks (indoor) | 14 | (10) |
- * Club domestic league appearances and goals

John Olu-Molomo (born July 20, 1968) is a Nigerian former professional soccer who played as a forward and midfielder in the Continental Indoor Soccer League and National Professional Soccer League.

== Career ==
Born on July 20, 1968, Olu-Molomo grew up in Ibadan, Nigeria. He attended Government College of Ibadan from 1978 to 1983. He entered Loma Linda University and earned a degree in business marketing, also completing a degree in occupational therapy. He began playing intramural soccer at Loma Linda. He spent one year with U.S. International University men's soccer team in 1990. In 1992, Olu-Molomo joined the Tucson Amigos of the USISL at mid-season when the team was 1-7. Tucson ended the season by losing in the championship game to the Palo Alto Firebirds. Olu-Molomo was All League. In 1994, Olu-Molomo signed with the San Diego Sockers of the Continental Indoor Soccer League. Olu-Molomo was the 1994 CISL Rookie of the Year On August 23, 1996, the Sockers traded Olu-Molomo to the Seattle SeaDogs. Olu-Molomo finished the 1996 season with Seattle, then spent the entire 1997 CISL season with Seattle, winning the league championship with them. In September 1997, the Edmonton Drillers selected Olu-Molomo in the National Professional Soccer League draft. On November 6, 1997, Edmonton traded Olu-Molomo to the Philadelphia KiXX in exchange for Ziad Allen. Olu-Molomo played for the KiXX that season. In 1998, the Florida Thundercats under the direction of former SeaDogs' coach Fernando Clavijo entered the NPSL. Clavijo brought much of the Seattle team, including Olu-Molomo, to the Thundercats. In February 1999, the Thundercats sent Olu-Molomo back to the Philadelphia KiXX. In 1999, Olu-Molomo played one season with the Dallas Sidekicks of the World Indoor Soccer League.
