= Rick Doucet =

Canadian businessman and politician

Rick Doucet MLA
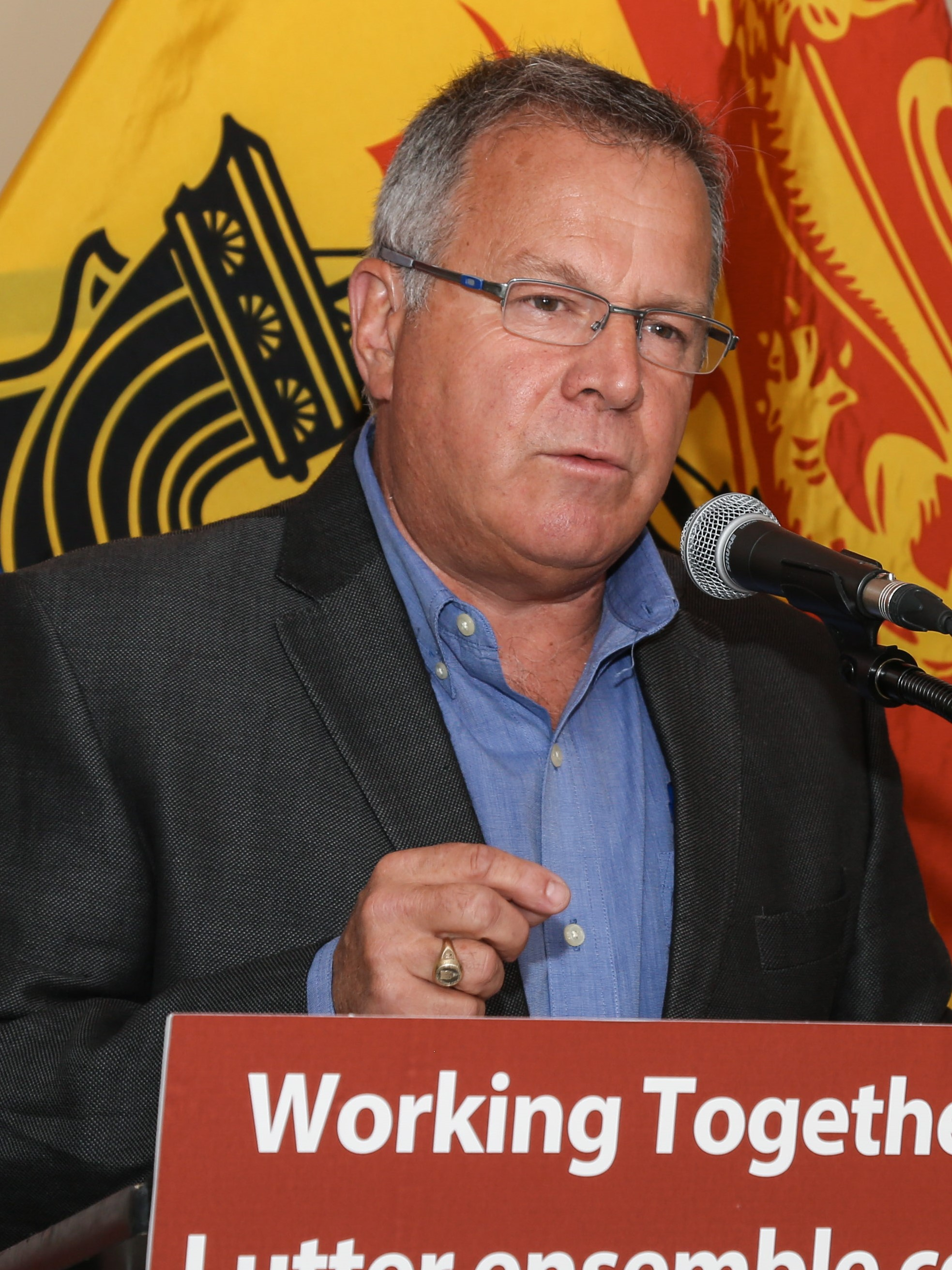
- Doucet in 2017

Minister of Aquaculture and Fisheries
- In office September 5, 2017 – October 5, 2018
- Premier: Brian Gallant
- Preceded by: Himself (Agriculture, Aquaculture, and Fisheries)
- Succeeded by: Benoît Bourque

Minister of Energy and Resource Development
- In office June 6, 2016 – October 5, 2018
- Premier: Brian Gallant
- Preceded by: Denis Landry (Natural Resources)
- Succeeded by: Roger Melanson

Minister of Agriculture, Aquaculture, and Fisheries
- In office October 7, 2014 – September 5, 2017
- Premier: Brian Gallant
- Preceded by: Mike Olscamp
- Succeeded by: Andrew Harvey (Agriculture, Mines, and Rural Affairs)

Minister of Economic Development
- In office October 7, 2014 – June 6, 2016
- Premier: Brian Gallant
- Preceded by: Bruce Fitch
- Succeeded by: Francine Landry

Member of the New Brunswick Legislative Assembly for Charlotte
- In office June 9, 2003 – September 18, 2006
- Preceded by: Sheldon Lee
- Succeeded by: riding redistributed

Member of the New Brunswick Legislative Assembly for Charlotte-The Isles
- In office 2006–2014
- Preceded by: first member
- Succeeded by: riding redistributed

Member of the New Brunswick Legislative Assembly for Fundy-The Isles-Saint John West
- In office 2014–2018
- Preceded by: first member
- Succeeded by: Andrea Anderson-Mason

Personal details
- Born: Sussex, New Brunswick
- Party: Liberal

Richard Michael Doucet (born in Sussex, New Brunswick) is a New Brunswick businessman and politician who has represented since 2003 the riding of Fundy-The Isles-Saint John West in the Legislative Assembly of New Brunswick.

== Family ==
Doucet lives in St. George, with his wife and two children, Nicole and Jonathan.

== Career ==
Doucet has had a varied career working in the air industry both as a marketing and sales official with a commercial airline and later as a cargo pilot. He started his own series of businesses in 1989 working simultaneously in the restaurant, photography, and advertising industries.

A Liberal, he was a member of the opposition shadow cabinet. He was critic for the Department of Energy from his first election in June 2003 until becoming critic for Fisheries & Aquaculture in February 2005.

Doucet received favourable media attention when shortly following his appointment as Energy Critic, he toured the province to visit all of its power generation facilities at his own expense.

He was re-elected in the 2006 election following which he joined the cabinet. On October 3, 2006, he was sworn in as Minister of Fisheries under the Shawn Graham government. He maintained this role throughout all of the four years the Liberals were in government.

Despite the losses received by the Shawn Graham Liberals in the 2010 provincial election, Doucet retained his seat, beating out the Progressive Conservative candidate Sharon Tucker. Doucet would sit in Opposition from 2010 to 2014, with his riding remaining the only Liberal controlled riding in southwestern New Brunswick. During his time in Opposition, Doucet was critic, at various periods, of Energy, Transportation and Public Safety. As critic for Public Safety, Doucet was very vocal in his displeasure with the Government's reaction to the flooding of December 2010 and Hurricane Arthur in July 2014.

In the 2014 election, Doucet's riding was affected by the 2013 electoral redistribution in New Brunswick. For this election, Doucet's principal challenger was incumbent Progressive Conservative MLA Jim Parrott. On September 22, 2014, Doucet was re-elected for a 4th consecutive time.

Doucet carried Motion 31 of the 3rd session of the 58th New Brunswick Legislative Assembly, to delegate a Select Committee on Cannabis to study the effects of legalization of cannabis on New Brunswick society.

On September 5, 2017, a cabinet portfolio rearrangement by the Gallant government had Mr. Doucet in charge of Aquaculture and Fisheries, as well as Energy and Resource Development

New Brunswick provincial government of Shawn Graham
Cabinet post (1)
| Predecessor | Office | Successor |
| David Alward | Minister of Fisheries; 2006–2010 previously part of the responsibilities of the Minister of Agriculture, Fisheries and Aquaculture and thereafter of the Minister of Agriculture, Aquaculture and Fisheries | Michael Olscamp |
