= Oven Head Island =

Island in New Brunswick, Canada

- Interactive map of Oven Head Island

Geography
- Location: Bay of Fundy

Administration
- Canada
- Province: New Brunswick
- County: Charlotte
- Parish: Saint Patrick Parish

Oven Head Island is a tidal island in the Saint Patrick Parish of Charlotte County, New Brunswick, Canada, where the Bay of Fundy enters Passamaquoddy Bay. The Digdeguash Estuary runs 6km from Oven Head to Salmon Falls.

The term "Oven Head" traditionally refers to both the tidal island, and the mainland adjacent to it attached by a gravel bar at low tide.

As of 2002, it was crown land protected under the Department of Energy and Resource Development, listed as Oven Head Provincial Park Reserve. It was later purchased by the Irving family who built private residences on the island.

It has brecciated rhyolite, and felsic pyroclastic rock.
