= Greg Schwager =

American soccer player

Personal information
- Full name: Gregory Schwager
- Date of birth: September 12, 1969 (age 57)
- Place of birth: United States
- Height: 6 ft 4 in (1.93 m)
- Position: Defender

Youth career
- 1991: San Jose State Spartans

Senior career*
Years	Team	Apps	(Gls)
1992–1993	Palo Alto Firebirds		
1994–1995	TuS Hoisdorf	20	(1)
1995–1996	TuS Celle	24	(1)
1996–1997	VfL Osnabrück	52	(4)
1998	Vejle Boldklub	9	(1)
1999	VfL Osnabrück	12	(0)
- * Club domestic league appearances and goals

Greg Schwager is a retired American soccer defender who played professionally in the United States, Germany and Denmark.

Schwager attended San Jose State University where he played on the men's soccer team in 1991. In 1992, he turned professional with the Palo Alto Firebirds of the USISL. That season, the Firebirds won the league championship and Schwager was named All League. In 1994, Schwager moved to Germany and signed with TuS Hoisdorf. He moved to TuS Celle FC a year later. In 1996, he moved up to VfL Osnabrück. He began the 1997–1998 season with VfL Osnabrück, but transferred to Vejle Boldklub of the Danish Superliga during the mid-season transfer window. He saw limited time with Vejle and was back in Germany with Osnabrück for the second half of the 1998–1999 season.
