= Charlotte (provincial electoral district, 1994–2006) =

Defunct provincial electoral district in New Brunswick, Canada

New Brunswick electoral district

Defunct provincial electoral district
- Legislature: Legislative Assembly of New Brunswick
- District created: 1994
- District abolished: 2006
- First contested: 1995
- Last contested: 2006

Charlotte was a provincial electoral district for the Legislative Assembly of New Brunswick, Canada, from 1994 to 2006. It was created from large parts of Charlotte Centre and Charlotte-Fundy. Following 2006, most of the district became part of Charlotte-The Isles

== Members of the Legislative Assembly ==
Assembly	Years	Member	Party
Riding created from Charlotte Centre, Charlotte-Fundy and Saint John West
53rd	1995–1999	Sheldon Lee	Liberal
54th	1999–2003	Sheldon Lee	Liberal
55th	2003–2006	Rick Doucet	Liberal
Riding dissolved into Charlotte-The Isles and Grand Bay-Westfield

== Election results ==
2003 New Brunswick general election
Party	Candidate	Votes	%	±%
Liberal	Rick Doucet	2,777	49.44	-8.49
Progressive Conservative	Sharon Tucker	1,573	28.00	-8.77
New Democratic	Patty Hooper	1,149	20.46	+15.15
Grey	Harold Smith	118	2.10	–
Total valid votes		5,617	100.0	
Liberal hold		Swing		+0.14

1999 New Brunswick general election
Party	Candidate	Votes	%	±%
Liberal	Sheldon Lee	3,263	57.93	-12.18
Progressive Conservative	Sharon Tucker	2,071	36.77	+12.36
New Democratic	Eugene A. Dugas	299	5.31	+2.92
Total valid votes		5,633	100.0	
Liberal hold		Swing		-12.27

1995 New Brunswick general election
Party	Candidate	Votes	%	±%
Liberal	Sheldon Lee	3,645	70.11	
Progressive Conservative	Sharon Tucker	1,269	24.41	
New Democratic	Eugene Dugas	124	2.39	
Confederation of Regions	Lynn Mason	107	2.06	
Independent	Teresa James	54	1.04	
Total valid votes		5,199	100.0	
Liberal notional hold		Swing		

== See also ==
- List of New Brunswick provincial electoral districts
- Canadian provincial electoral districts
