= Guillermo McFarlane =

American soccer player

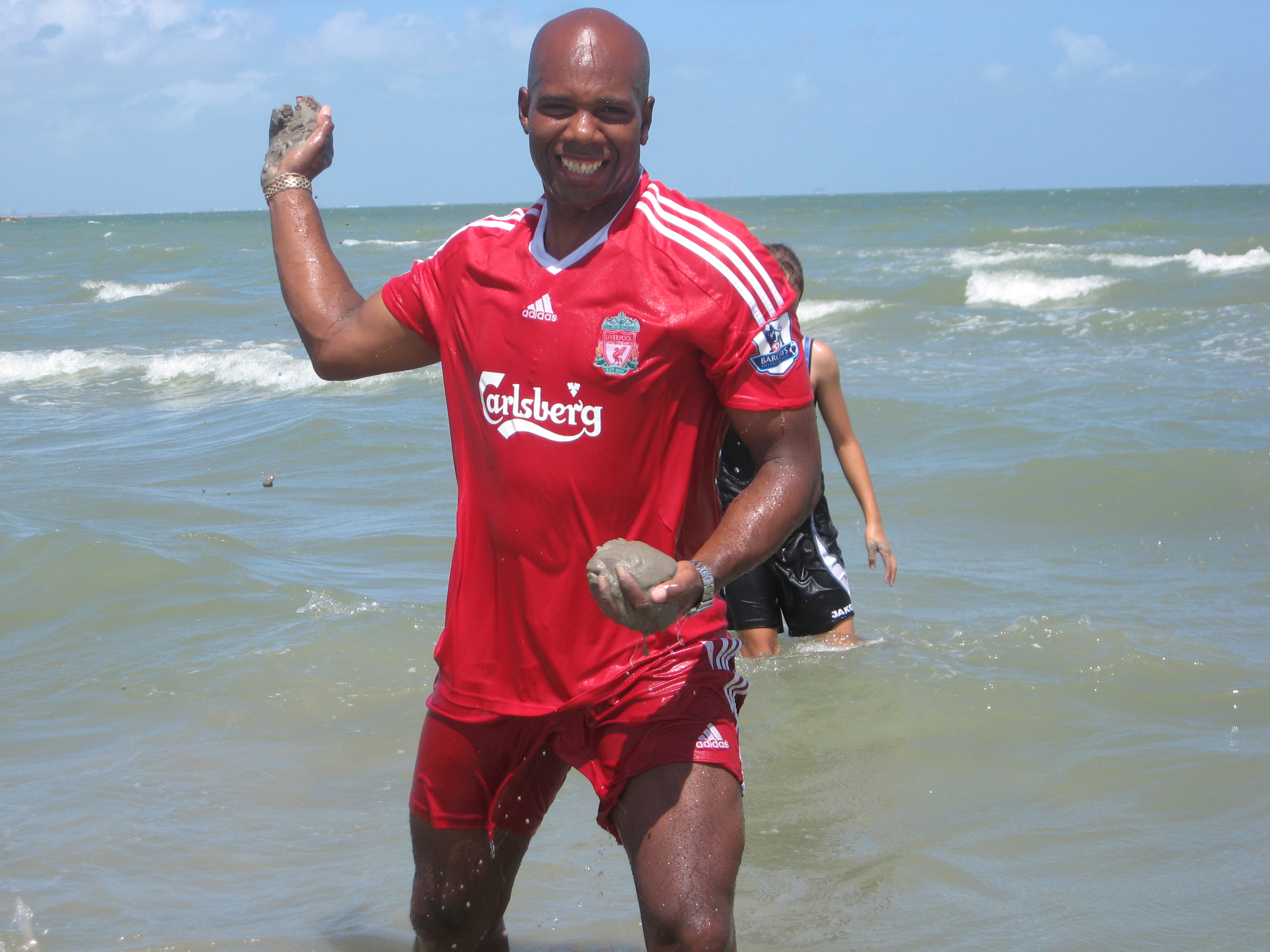

Personal information
- Date of birth: January 18, 1971 (age 55)
- Place of birth: Panama City, Panama
- Height: 5 ft 11 in (1.80 m)
- Position: Defender

Youth career
- United Allstars: University of Texas at El Paso

Senior career*
Years	Team	Apps	(Gls)
–2004	El Paso Patriots		
1999–2001	Wichita Wings (indoor)	45	(2)
- * Club domestic league appearances and goals

Guillermo McFarlane is an American retired soccer defender who played professionally in the USL A-League and National Professional Soccer League. McFarlane began playing soccer at the age of 18 and while at The University Of Texas At El Paso (UTEP), McFarlane was an NCCSA first team All American in 1991 and 1994. Also known as La Pantera.

In 1992, McFarlane played for the El Paso Patriots in the USISL. He was All League that season. He also played for El Paso in 1995 and 1996. In 1995, he was a South Central Division All Star defender. From 1997 to 2004, McFarlane played 147 games for the Patriots.while with the patriots before the U.S. open cup final against the Richmond Kikers, McFarlane was named Top Defender in the USA Today article on August 24, 1995. During those year, the Patriots played in various USISL/USL leagues, including the USISL Select League, USL A-League and USL Premier Development League. In 1999, McFarlane signed with the Wichita Wings of the National Professional Soccer League, playing two seasons with them. Parents are Guillermo E McFarlane Sr and Patricia Elena Leonard de McFarlane. Siblings are Narcisa Leonard and Irene Vasquez
