= DeCosta Young =

Canadian politician

Member of the Legislative Assembly of New Brunswick
- In office 1967–1978
- Succeeded by: Sheldon Lee
- Constituency: Charlotte (1967–74); Charlotte Centre (1974–78)

Personal details
- Born: April 11, 1919 Deer Island, New Brunswick
- Died: December 16, 2005 (aged 86) St. Stephen, New Brunswick
- Party: Progressive Conservative Party of New Brunswick
- Spouse: Pauline Rachael Johnson
- Children: 2
- Occupation: building contractor and sardine fishery operator

W. DeCosta Young (April 11, 1919 – December 16, 2005) was a Canadian politician. He had served in the Legislative Assembly of New Brunswick from 1967 to 1978 as member of the Progressive Conservative party.
