= Charlotte Centre =

Defunct provincial electoral district in New Brunswick, Canada

New Brunswick electoral district

Defunct provincial electoral district
- Legislature: Legislative Assembly of New Brunswick
- District created: 1973
- District abolished: 1994
- First contested: 1974
- Last contested: 1991

Charlotte Centre was a provincial electoral district in New Brunswick, Canada. It was created from the multi-member riding of Charlotte in the 1973 electoral redistribution, and was abolished in the 1994 electoral redistribution.

== Members of the Legislative Assembly ==
Assembly	Years	Member	Party
Riding created from Charlotte (1785–1974)
48th	1974–1978	DeCosta Young	Progressive Conservative
49th	1978–1982	Sheldon Lee	Liberal
50th	1982–1987	Sheldon Lee	Liberal
51st	1987–1991	Sheldon Lee	Liberal
52nd	1991–1995	Sheldon Lee	Liberal
Riding dissolved into Charlotte (1994–2006) and Fundy Isles

== Election results ==
1991 New Brunswick general election
Party	Candidate	Votes	%	±%
Liberal	Sheldon Lee	2,195	65.64	-7.38
Confederation of Regions	Connie M. Stewart	516	15.43	–
Progressive Conservative	Stanley John Smith	471	14.08	-8.90
New Democratic	Jean Stewart	162	4.84	+0.84
Total valid votes		3,344	100.0	
Liberal hold		Swing		-11.40

1987 New Brunswick general election
Party	Candidate	Votes	%	±%
Liberal	Sheldon Lee	2,431	73.02	+25.14
Progressive Conservative	Stanley J. Smith	765	22.98	-22.07
New Democratic	Graham Richardson	133	4.00	-3.06
Total valid votes		3,329	100.0	
Liberal hold		Swing		+23.60

1982 New Brunswick general election
Party	Candidate	Votes	%	±%
Liberal	Sheldon A. Lee	1,471	47.88	-5.83
Progressive Conservative	Gregory F. Thompson	1,384	45.05	-1.24
New Democratic	Wayne Townsend	217	7.06	–
Total valid votes		3,072	100.0	
Liberal hold		Swing		-2.30

1978 New Brunswick general election
Party	Candidate	Votes	%	±%
Liberal	Sheldon Lee	1,404	53.71	+7.08
Progressive Conservative	Robert D. "Bob" Lee	1,210	46.29	-3.77
Total valid votes		2,614	100.0	
Liberal gain from Progressive Conservative		Swing		+5.42

1974 New Brunswick general election
Party	Candidate	Votes	%
Progressive Conservative	DeCosta W. Young	1,211	50.06
Liberal	Sheldon Lee	1,128	46.63
Independent	William Hooper	80	3.31
Total valid votes		2,419	100.0
The previous multi-member riding of Charlotte went totally Progressive Conservative in the last election, with DeCosta Young being one of the four incumbents.

== See also ==
- List of New Brunswick provincial electoral districts
- Canadian provincial electoral districts
