= Bird Island (New Brunswick) =

Island in New Brunswick, Canada

Geography
- Location: Bay of Fundy

Administration
- Canada
- Province: New Brunswick
- County: Charlotte
- Parish: Saint Patrick Parish

Bird Island is an undeveloped island in the Saint Patrick Parish of Charlotte County, New Brunswick, Canada, where the Bay of Fundy enters Passamaquoddy Bay.

The island sits at the mouth of the Digdeguash River.
