= Andrea Anderson-Mason =

Canadian politician

Andrea Anderson-Mason KC
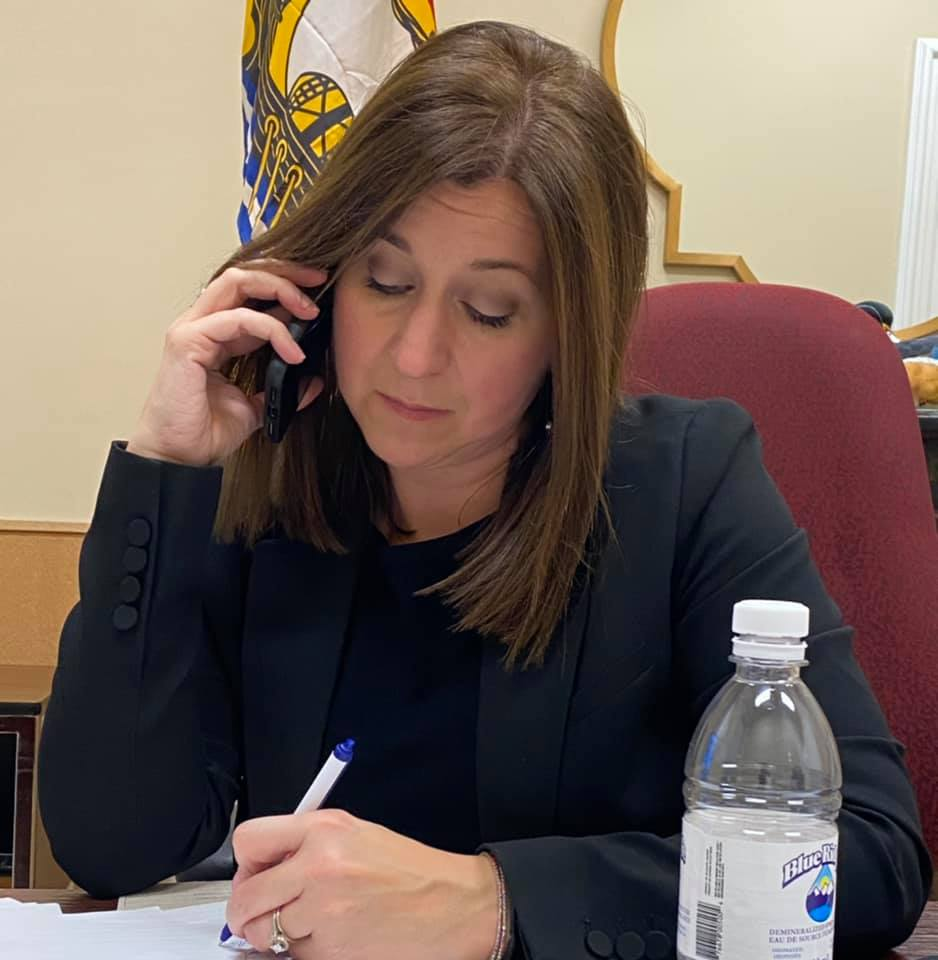

Attorney General of New Brunswick
- In office November 9, 2018 – September 29, 2020
- Premier: Blaine Higgs
- Preceded by: Brian Gallant
- Succeeded by: Ted Flemming

Minister of Justice
- In office November 9, 2018 – September 29, 2020
- Premier: Blaine Higgs
- Preceded by: Denis Landry (Justice and Public Safety)
- Succeeded by: Ted Flemming

Member of the New Brunswick Legislative Assembly for Fundy-The Isles-Saint John West
- In office September 24, 2018 – September 19, 2024
- Preceded by: Rick Doucet
- Succeeded by: Ian Lee

Personal details
- Party: Progressive Conservative

Andrea Dawn Anderson-Mason, KC is a lawyer and former Canadian politician, who was elected to the Legislative Assembly of New Brunswick in the 2018 election. She represented the electoral district of Fundy-The Isles-Saint John West as a member of the Progressive Conservative Party of New Brunswick until 2024. She was appointed the Minister of Justice and Attorney General of New Brunswick in the Government of Blaine Higgs on November 9, 2018. She was re-elected in the 2020 provincial election. She was not named to cabinet after the 2020 election. On May 24, 2024 she announced that she would not run in the next election, stating that she "has concluded that members of the legislature don't play a meaningful role in developing policy and legislation in the Higgs government".

Anderson‑Mason currently serves as the Manager of Privacy and Policy in the Secretariat Office at the University of New Brunswick.

https://www.unb.ca/faculty-staff/directory/university-secretariat/mason-anderson-andrea.html

== Electoral record ==
=== Fundy-The Isles-Saint John West ===
2020 New Brunswick general election
Party	Candidate	Votes	%	±%
Progressive Conservative	Andrea Anderson-Mason	4,740	66.47	+18.91
Liberal	Tony Mann	726	10.18	-20.07
People's Alliance	Vincent P. Edgett	688	9.65	-4.14
Green	Lois P. Mitchell	686	9.62	+3.76
New Democratic	Sharon R. Greenlaw	291	4.08	+1.55
Total valid votes		7,131	100.0	
Total rejected ballots		23	0.32	
Turnout		7,154	62.63	
Eligible voters		11,423		
Progressive Conservative hold		Swing		+19.49
Source: Elections New Brunswick

2018 New Brunswick general election
Party	Candidate	Votes	%	±%
Progressive Conservative	Andrea Anderson-Mason	3,808	47.6	
Liberal	Rick Doucet	2,422	30.3	
People's Alliance	Doug Ellis	1,104	13.8	
Green	Romey Frances Heuff	469	5.9	
New Democratic	Keith LeBlanc	203	2.5	
Total valid votes		8,006	100.0	
Total rejected ballots		23		
Turnout		8,029	71.03	
Eligible voters		11,303		
Source: Elections New Brunswick
