= Ian Lee (politician) =

Canadian politician

Member of the New Brunswick Legislative Assembly for Fundy-The Isles-Saint John Lorneville
- Incumbent
- Assumed office October 21, 2024
- Preceded by: Andrea Anderson-Mason

Personal details
- Party: Progressive Conservative

Ian Lee is a Canadian politician who was elected to the Legislative Assembly of New Brunswick in the 2024 election. He was elected in the riding of Fundy-The Isles-Saint John Lorneville.

Before running for office, Lee worked as a teacher at Fundy Middle and High School in St. George.

== Electoral record ==
2024 New Brunswick general election: Fundy-The Isles-Saint John Lorneville
| Party | Candidate | Votes | % | ±% |
|---|---|---|---|---|
| Progressive Conservative | Ian Lee | 3,971 | 59.02 | -7.8 |
| Liberal | Patty Borthwick | 2,052 | 30.50 | +20.8 |
| Green | Rhonda Connell | 346 | 5.14 | -4.6 |
| New Democratic | Chris Wanamaker | 158 | 2.35 | -1.5 |
| Consensus NB | Sharon Greenlaw | 113 | 1.68 | - |
| Libertarian | Keith Tays | 88 | 1.31 | - |
| Total valid votes | | 6,728 | 99.79 | |
| Total rejected ballots | | 14 | 0.21 | |
| Turnout | | 6,742 | - | |
| Eligible voters | | - | | |
| Progressive Conservative hold | | Swing | | -14.3 |
Source: Elections New Brunswick
