= Tom Wurdack =

American soccer player

Personal information
- Full name: Thomas Wurdack
- Date of birth: February 24, 1967 (age 59)
- Place of birth: St. Louis, Missouri, U.S.
- Height: 5 ft 10 in (1.78 m)
- Position: Defender

College career
Years	Team	Apps	(Gls)
1987–1988	UCF Knights		

Senior career*
Years	Team	Apps	(Gls)
1989–1990	Orlando Lions		
1992–1994	Orlando Lions		
1995–1996	Atlanta Ruckus		
1997	Orlando Sundogs	17	(2)
- * Club domestic league appearances and goals

Thomas Wurdack (born February 24, 1967) is a retired American soccer defender who played professionally in the American Professional Soccer League and USISL.

In 1987 and 1988, Wurdack played collegiate soccer with the University of Central Florida. In 1989, Wurdack turned professional with the Orlando Lions in the American Soccer League. In 1992 and 1993, he played for the second Orlando Lions in the USISL. In 1995, Wurdack played for the Atlanta Ruckus when it went to the A-League final. He then began the 1996 season with the Ruckus before being traded to the Rochester Rhinos. He refused to move to Rochester and sat out the rest of the season. In November 1996, Wurdack signed with the Orlando Sundogs, playing for them in 1997.
