= Vince Da Silva =

American soccer player

Personal information
- Full name: Vincent Da Silva
- Date of birth: February 4, 1967 (age 59)
- Position: Goalkeeper

Senior career*
Years	Team	Apps	(Gls)
1988	San Jose Earthquakes		
1989	Real Santa Barbara		
1992–1993	Palo Alto Firebirds		
1993–1996	Alverca	89	(0)
- * Club domestic league appearances and goals

Vincent Da Silva is an American retired soccer goalkeeper who played professionally in the United States and Portugal.

Da Silva was a member of the Santa Clara Sporting Club in his youth. In 1988, he played for the San Jose Earthquakes in the Western Soccer Alliance. That season, the F.C. Seattle Storm crushed the Earthquakes, 5–0, in the championship game. Da Silva came on in the 73rd minute for starter Aram Kardzair and kept a clean sheet for the rest of the game. In 1989, he played for Real Santa Barbara. In 1992, Da Silva had the lowest goals against average in the USISL while playing for the Palo Alto Firebirds. Da Silva was All League and the Firebirds won the league title. In 1993, Da Silva was All League for the second year in a row with the Firebirds. That fall, he moved to Porgugal to sign with F.C. Alverca in the Segunda Divisão de Honra.
