= Sheldon Lee (politician) =

Canadian politician (1933–2025)

Member of the Legislative Assembly of New Brunswick
- In office 1978–2003
- Preceded by: DeCosta Young
- Succeeded by: Rick Doucet
- Constituency: Charlotte Centre (1978–95); Charlotte (1995–03)

Personal details
- Born: March 24, 1933 Bonny River, New Brunswick, Canada
- Died: October 21, 2025 (aged 92) Quispamsis, New Brunswick, Canada
- Party: New Brunswick Liberal Association

Sheldon Albert Lee (March 24, 1933 – October 21, 2025) was a Canadian politician. He was the Liberal member of Legislative Assembly of New Brunswick for the riding of Charlotte Centre from 1978 to 1995 and then for the new district of Charlotte from 1995 New Brunswick general election until his retirement at the calling of the 2003 election. Lee died in Quispamsis, New Brunswick on October 21, 2025, at the age of 92.

== Electoral record ==
1999 New Brunswick general election
Party	Candidate	Votes	%	±%
Liberal	Sheldon Lee	3,263	57.93	-12.18
Progressive Conservative	Sharon Tucker	2,071	36.77	+12.36
New Democratic	Eugene A. Dugas	299	5.31	+2.92
Total valid votes		5,633	100.0	
Liberal hold		Swing		-12.27

1995 New Brunswick general election
Party	Candidate	Votes	%	±%
Liberal	Sheldon Lee	3,645	70.11	
Progressive Conservative	Sharon Tucker	1,269	24.41	
New Democratic	Eugene Dugas	124	2.39	
Confederation of Regions	Lynn Mason	107	2.06	
Independent	Teresa James	54	1.04	
Total valid votes		5,199	100.0	
Liberal notional hold		Swing		

1991 New Brunswick general election
Party	Candidate	Votes	%	±%
Liberal	Sheldon Lee	2,195	65.64	-7.38
Confederation of Regions	Connie M. Stewart	516	15.43	–
Progressive Conservative	Stanley John Smith	471	14.08	-8.90
New Democratic	Jean Stewart	162	4.84	+0.84
Total valid votes		3,344	100.0	
Liberal hold		Swing		-11.40

1987 New Brunswick general election
Party	Candidate	Votes	%	±%
Liberal	Sheldon Lee	2,431	73.02	+25.14
Progressive Conservative	Stanley J. Smith	765	22.98	-22.07
New Democratic	Graham Richardson	133	4.00	-3.06
Total valid votes		3,329	100.0	
Liberal hold		Swing		+23.60

1982 New Brunswick general election
Party	Candidate	Votes	%	±%
Liberal	Sheldon A. Lee	1,471	47.88	-5.83
Progressive Conservative	Gregory F. Thompson	1,384	45.05	-1.24
New Democratic	Wayne Townsend	217	7.06	–
Total valid votes		3,072	100.0	
Liberal hold		Swing		-2.30

1978 New Brunswick general election
Party	Candidate	Votes	%	±%
Liberal	Sheldon Lee	1,404	53.71	+7.08
Progressive Conservative	Robert D. "Bob" Lee	1,210	46.29	-3.77
Total valid votes		2,614	100.0	
Liberal gain from Progressive Conservative		Swing		+5.42

1974 New Brunswick general election
Party	Candidate	Votes	%
Progressive Conservative	DeCosta W. Young	1,211	50.06
Liberal	Sheldon Lee	1,128	46.63
Independent	William Hooper	80	3.31
Total valid votes		2,419	100.0
The previous multi-member riding of Charlotte went totally Progressive Conservative in the last election, with DeCosta Young being one of the four incumbents.

== Sources ==
- Canadian Parliamentary Guide, 1988, PG Normandin
