= Fernando Clavijo =

Uruguayan-American soccer player and coach (1956–2019)

Personal information
- Full name: Fernando Caetano Clavijo Cedrés
- Date of birth: January 23, 1956
- Place of birth: Maldonado, Uruguay
- Date of death: February 8, 2019 (aged 63)
- Place of death: Fort Lauderdale, Florida, U.S.
- Height: 5 ft 10 in (1.78 m)
- Positions: Midfielder; defender

Senior career*
Years	Team	Apps	(Gls)
1972–1979	Atenas		
1979–1981	New York Apollo/United	66	(5)
1981–1983	New York Arrows (indoor)	65	(11)
1983–1984	Golden Bay Earthquakes	40	(1)
1984–1988	San Diego Sockers (indoor)	187	(49)
1988–1989	Los Angeles Lazers (indoor)	46	(10)
1989–1992	St. Louis Storm (indoor)	136	(41)

International career
1990–1994	United States	61	(0)
1992	United States futsal	8	(2)

Managerial career
- 1991: St. Louis Storm
- 1995–1997: Seattle SeaDogs
- 1998–1999: Florida ThunderCats
- 1998: Nigeria (assistant)
- 1998: Project 40 (assistant)
- 1998: U.S. Futsal
- 1999: MetroStars (assistant)
- 2000–2002: New England Revolution
- 2003–2005: Haiti
- 2005–2008: Colorado Rapids
- 2009: Miami FC
Medal record
Representing United States
Winner	CONCACAF Gold Cup	1991
Runner-up	CONCACAF Gold Cup	1993
Men's Soccer
- * Club domestic league appearances and goals

Fernando Caetano Clavijo Cedrés (January 23, 1956 – February 8, 2019) was a Uruguayan-American soccer defender and former head coach of the New England Revolution and Colorado Rapids of Major League Soccer. He played three seasons in the American Soccer League, two in the North American Soccer League and ten in the Major Indoor Soccer League. He earned 61 caps with the United States men's national soccer team and eight with the U.S. national futsal team. He later coached both indoor and outdoor teams as well as at the national team level with Nigeria and Haiti. He was a member of the National Soccer Hall of Fame and is a 2014 inductee into the Indoor Soccer Hall of Fame.

== Club career ==
=== Outdoor ===
Clavijo began his professional playing career at the age of 16 with Uruguayan club Atenas de San Carlos. He spent his six seasons with Atenas at forward. In 1979, Clavijo, at the age of 22, left Uruguay and with his wife moved to the United States taking a job at a New Jersey restaurant. At this time, he started playing amateur soccer at an amateur club when some saw him playing and suggested him to try out for a professional club. After a successful trial, Clavijo signed with New York Apollo of the American Soccer League (ASL). The Apollo changed its name to the New York United between the 1979 and 1980 season. Clavijo then spent two seasons with the United. In 1983, he moved to the San Jose Earthquakes of the North American Soccer League (NASL). In 1984, he was an NASL All-Star with the Earthquakes.

=== Indoor ===
Clavijo began his indoor soccer career, which rapidly eclipsed his outdoor career, in 1981 with the New York Arrows of Major Indoor Soccer League. The move indoors also brought a change from forward to defender. In 1984, he moved to the San Diego Sockers where he contributed to the Sockers winning three championships in his four years with the team.

== International career ==
=== Outdoor ===
In 1987, Clavijo became an American citizen. On November 21, 1990, he debuted for the United States in a friendly match against the Soviet Union in Port of Spain, Trinidad and Tobago. He then became a key player for the American team, being part of the team that won the 1991 CONCACAF Gold Cup and that represented the United States in their home soil at the 1994 FIFA World Cup. Despite being 38 years old at the time (the oldest player on the American squad), Clavijo started three of the four matches the United States played in the tournament. Playing mostly as a left-back, he was on the field in the 2-1 historic victory against Colombia and in the 1–0 defeat against Brazil in the Round of 16. After the World Cup, Clavijo retired from professional soccer having represented the United States on 61 occasions in only five years of international career.

=== Futsal ===
In 1992, he had earned eight caps, scoring two goals, for the United States national futsal team. He was part of the team that finished second at the 1992 FIFA Futsal World Championship. In 1998, he also served as the head coach of the United States national futsal team.

== Coaching ==
Clavijo's coaching career began in 1991 with the St. Louis Storm where he was player-coach. In 1994, he became the head coach of the Seattle SeaDogs of the Continental Indoor Soccer League (CISL). In 1997, he was the CISL Coach of the Year. He then moved to the Florida ThunderCats of the National Professional Soccer League. He then assisted ex-U.S. coach Bora Milutinovic with the Nigerian national team at the 1998 FIFA World Cup. He followed Bora to Major League Soccer as well, assisting him with the MetroStars in 1999, the worst season for any team in league history at the time. He left the club after the year, assuming head coaching duties with the New England Revolution in December 1999.

Clavijo brought the Revolution to their second-ever playoff berth his first year in charge. Under his management the franchise finished the 2000 season with a .500 record, the best record in the franchise's history at that time. In his second season in charge the Revolution finished mid-table, but advanced to the 2001 U.S. Open Cup Final, losing away to the Los Angeles Galaxy (in Fullerton, CA.) by 1–2 in extra time. Clavijo was fired midway through the 2002 season.

On October 16, 2003, Clavijo became the head coach of the Haitian national team. He led them through World Cup Qualifying, resigning his position after Haiti lost to Jamaica. On December 22, 2004, the Colorado Rapids hired Clavijo as the team's head coach. Clavijo was inducted into the U.S. National Soccer Hall of Fame in 2005. Coach Clavijo resigned from the Colorado Rapids on August 20, 2008, after a record in all competitions of 43 wins – 55 losses – 26 draws. Clavijo served as Technical Director for MLS club FC Dallas from 2012 to 2019.

== Personal life ==
Clavijo died on February 8, 2019, in Fort Lauderdale, Florida, after five years with diagnosed multiple myeloma.

== Playing stats ==
=== MISL stats ===
Year	Team	GP	G	A	PTS	PIM
1981/82	New York	22	2	2	4	8
1982/83	New York	43	9	11	20	12
1984/85	San Diego	39	5	4	9	6
1985/86	San Diego	47	17	9	26	13
1986/87	San Diego	50	16	12	28	12
1987/88	San Diego	51	11	16	27	27
1988/89	Los Angeles	46	10	17	29	29
1989/90	St. Louis	52	17	18	35	10
1990/91	St. Louis	47	15	23	38	18
1991/92	St. Louis	37	9	19	28	4
TOTAL	MISL	434	111	131	242	139

=== NASL ===
Year	Team	GP	G	A	PTS
1983	Golden Bay	21	0	1	1
1984	Golden Bay	19	1	1	3
TOTAL	NASL	40	1	2	4
