= Sergio Mora (soccer, born 1942) =

American soccer player and coach

Personal information
- Full name: Sergio Mora Zuniga
- Date of birth: June 27, 1942
- Place of birth: San Isidro de El General, Costa Rica
- Date of death: December 26, 2009 (aged 67)
- Place of death: Lake Mary, Florida, United States
- Height: 5 ft 7 in (1.70 m)
- Position: Forward

International career
Years	Team	Apps	(Gls)
1972	United States	1	(0)

Managerial career
- 1995: Orlando Lions

Sergio "Sy" Mora Zuniga was a soccer player who played as a forward. Born in Costa Rica, he earned a cap in a 2–1 loss to Mexico on September 10, 1972.

In 1995, Mora, who coached several youth teams in central Florida, coached the Orlando Lions of the USISL. He also worked for Martin Marietta
