= Jason Haupt =

American soccer player

Personal information
- Place of birth: Miami, Florida, U.S.
- Positions: Forward; midfielder

Youth career
- 1987–1990: UNC Greensboro Spartans

Senior career*
Years	Team	Apps	(Gls)
1993–1997	Greensboro Dynamo	92	(30)
1999–2000	Carolina Dynamo	26	(9)
- * Club domestic league appearances and goals

Jason Haupt is an American retired soccer defender who played professionally in the USISL A-League.

== Youth ==
In 1984, Haupt's youth club, the Florida Gold Coast won the AAU U-16 national championship. He attended the University of North Carolina at Greensboro where he played on the men's soccer team from 1987 to 1990. In 1987, Haupt and his teammates won the NCAA Division III Men's Soccer Championship. Haupt was a 1989 and 1990 First Team Division III NCAA All American and finished his career with the school's career record of seventy-seven goals. In 2001, UNCG inducted Haupt into its Athletic Hall of Fame.

== Professional ==
In 1993, Haupt signed with the Greensboro Dynamo where he would remain for his professional career. In 1993, the Dynamo won the USISL championship and Haupt was All League In May 1994, Haupt had a season ending knee injury. He returned in 1996. In 1997, the Dynamo finished as runner up to the Milwaukee Rampage the championship The team went on hiatus in 1998, but when they resumed play in 1999, Haupt rejoined them, finishing his career in 2000.
