= East Bay Red Riders =

East Bay Red Riders were an American soccer team based in Oakland, California that played in the USISL.

== Year-by-year ==
Year	Division	League	Reg. season	Playoffs	Open Cup
1992	N/A	USISL	4th, Pacific	Did not qualify	Did not enter
1993	N/A	USISL	8th, Pacific	Did not qualify	Did not enter
