= Fundy-The Isles-Saint John Lorneville =

Provincial electoral district in New Brunswick, Canada

New Brunswick electoral district
- The riding of Fundy-The Isles-Saint John Lorneville (as it exists from 2023) in relation to other New Brunswick electoral districts
- Coordinates: 45.198°N 66.489°W

Provincial electoral district
- Legislature: Legislative Assembly of New Brunswick
MLA
Ian Lee
Progressive Conservative
- District created: 2006
- First contested: 2006
- Last contested: 2024

Demographics
- Population (2011): 15,276
- Electors (2013): 11,008
- Census division(s): Charlotte, Saint John

Fundy-The Isles-Saint John Lorneville (French: Fundy–Les-Îles–Saint-Jean Lorneville) is a provincial electoral district for the Legislative Assembly of New Brunswick, Canada.

== History ==
The constituency was created as Charlotte-The Isles in 2006 as a result of a merger of the old district of Charlotte with the district of Fundy Isles less Campobello Island which instead became part of the new Charlotte-Campobello district. The largest community within this riding is the town of St. George.

Ian Lee, is the current Member of the Legislative Assembly, a former teacher at Fundy Middle and High School. He was elected in 2024.

Under the recommendations of a 2012 Electoral Boundaries and Representation Commission, the boundaries of district were adjusted and accepted by the Provincial Government. While the district lost polls from its western boundary, it gained area in the east with the addition of polls in St. John County. The commission did not recommend a name change, but the electoral boundaries commission changed its name from Charlotte-The Isles to Fundy-The Isles-Saint John West. The riding was renamed Fundy-The Isles-Saint John Lorneville in the 2023 redistribution when it lost the communities of Martinon, Ketepec, Belmont, and Morna to Saint John West-Lancaster.

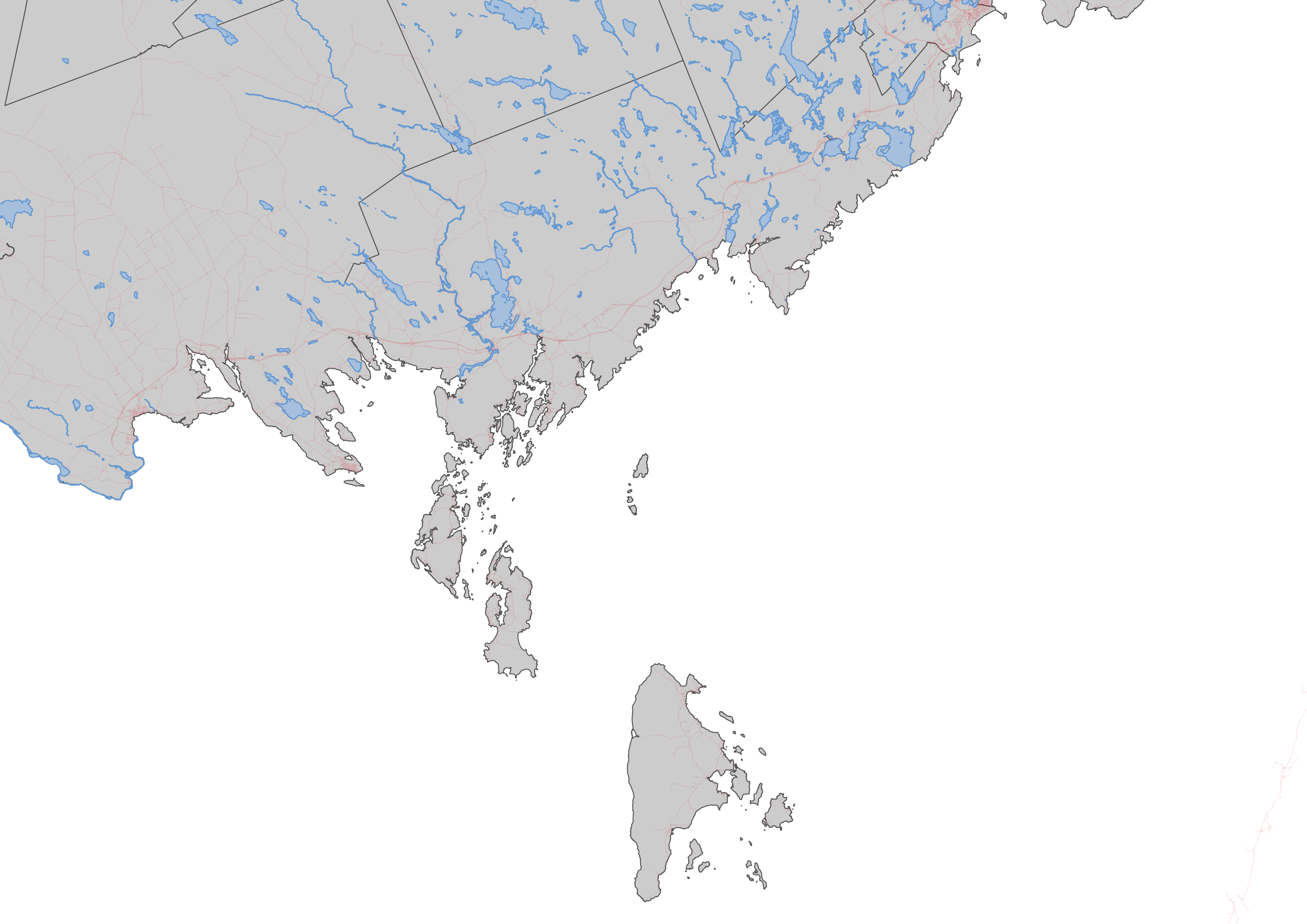
Fundy-The Isles-Saint John Lorneville (as it exists from 2023) and the roads in the riding

== Members of the Legislative Assembly ==
Assembly	Years	Member	Party
Charlotte-The Isles
Riding created from Charlotte and Fundy Isles
56th	2006–2010	Rick Doucet	Liberal
57th	2010–2014	Rick Doucet	Liberal
Fundy-The Isles-Saint John West
58th	2014–2018	Rick Doucet	Liberal
59th	2018–2020	Andrea Anderson-Mason	Progressive Conservative
60th	2020–2024	Andrea Anderson-Mason	Progressive Conservative
Fundy-The Isles-Saint John Lorneville
61st	2024–Present	Ian Lee	Progressive Conservative

== Election results ==
=== Fundy-The Isles-Saint John Lorneville ===
2024 New Brunswick general election
Party	Candidate	Votes	%	±%
Progressive Conservative	Ian Lee	3,971	59.02	-7.8
Liberal	Patty Borthwick	2,052	30.50	+20.8
Green	Rhonda Connell	346	5.14	-4.6
New Democratic	Chris Wanamaker	158	2.35	-1.5
Consensus NB	Sharon Greenlaw	113	1.68	-
Libertarian	Keith Tays	88	1.31	-
Total valid votes		6,728	99.79	
Total rejected ballots		14	0.21	
Turnout		6,742	-	
Eligible voters		-		
Progressive Conservative hold		Swing		-14.3
Source: Elections New Brunswick

2020 provincial election redistributed results
Party	%
Progressive Conservative	66.8
People's Alliance	10.0
Liberal	9.7
Green	9.7
New Democratic	3.8

=== Fundy-The Isles-Saint John West ===
2020 New Brunswick general election
Party	Candidate	Votes	%	±%
Progressive Conservative	Andrea Anderson-Mason	4,740	66.47	+18.91
Liberal	Tony Mann	726	10.18	-20.07
People's Alliance	Vincent P. Edgett	688	9.65	-4.14
Green	Lois P. Mitchell	686	9.62	+3.76
New Democratic	Sharon R. Greenlaw	291	4.08	+1.55
Total valid votes		7,131	99.68	
Total rejected ballots		23	0.32	
Turnout		7,154	61.8	
Eligible voters		11,577		
Progressive Conservative hold		Swing		+19.49
Source: Elections New Brunswick

2018 New Brunswick general election
Party	Candidate	Votes	%	±%
Progressive Conservative	Andrea Anderson-Mason	3,808	47.56	+22.17
Liberal	Rick Doucet	2,422	30.25	-32.22
People's Alliance	Doug Ellis	1,104	13.79	--
Green	Romey Frances Heuff	469	5.86	+1.47
New Democratic	Keith LeBlanc	203	2.53	-5.22
Total valid votes		8,006	100.0	
Total rejected ballots		23		
Turnout		8,029	71.03	
Eligible voters		11,303		
Source: Elections New Brunswick

2014 New Brunswick general election
Party	Candidate	Votes	%	±%
Liberal	Rick Doucet	4,498	62.47	+11.11
Progressive Conservative	Jim Parrott	1,828	25.39	-11.54
New Democratic	Terry James	558	7.75	+2.85
Green	Krysta Oland	316	4.39	+1.58
Total valid votes		7,200	100.0	
Total rejected ballots		41	0.57	
Turnout		7,241	62.76	
Eligible voters		11,538		
Liberal notional hold		Swing		+11.32
Source: Elections New Brunswick

=== Charlotte-The Isles ===
2010 New Brunswick general election
Party	Candidate	Votes	%	±%
Liberal	Rick Doucet	3,176	51.36	-4.21
Progressive Conservative	Sharon Tucker	2,284	36.93	-3.40
New Democratic	Sharon Greenlaw	303	4.90	+0.80
People's Alliance	Theresa James	247	3.99	–
Green	Burt Folkins	174	2.81	–
Total valid votes		6,184	100	
Total rejected ballots		40	0.64	
Turnout		6,224	70.81	
Eligible voters		8,790		
Liberal hold		Swing		-0.40
Source: Elections New Brunswick

2006 New Brunswick general election
Party	Candidate	Votes	%	±%
Liberal	Rick Doucet	3,619	55.57	
Progressive Conservative	Wayne Sturgeon	2,627	40.33	
New Democratic	Sharon Greenlaw	267	4.10	
Total valid votes		6,513	100.0	
Liberal notional gain		Swing		
Source: Elections New Brunswick

== See also ==
- List of New Brunswick provincial electoral districts
- Canadian provincial electoral districts
