= Western Heights High School (Oklahoma) =

High school in Oklahoma, United States

Coordinates: 35.42072°N 97.653956°W

Western Heights High School, Oklahoma City is the high school of Western Heights Public Schools, which is a small independent school district located in southwest Oklahoma City, Oklahoma, United States of America. It is located at 8201 SW 44th St, Oklahoma City, OK 73179.

== Alumni ==
- Jared Hess, wrestler, retired professional MMA fighter
