= Sheldon Lee (footballer) =

English footballer

Personal information
- Place of birth: India
- Positions: Forward; midfielder

Youth career
- 1983–1985: Swindon Town

Senior career*
Years	Team	Apps	(Gls)
1992–1994	Orlando Lions		
1997	Orlando Sundogs	27	(1)
- * Club domestic league appearances and goals

Sheldon Lee was an English association football forward who played professionally in the USISL A-League.

Born in India, Lee grew up in England. In 1992, the twenty-four-year-old Lee was the MVP of the United States Interregional Soccer League outdoor season. In 1993, he was the league's leading scorer and All League. In 1994, he began the season with eight goals in five games, but suffered a season-ending knee injury. In 1997, Lee spent one season with the Orlando Sundogs in the USISL A-League.
