= Efren Rodarte =

American soccer player

Personal information
- Positions: Forward; midfielder

Senior career*
Years	Team	Apps	(Gls)
1990–1991	Colorado Foxes		
1992–1999	El Paso Patriots		
- * Club domestic league appearances and goals

Efren Rodarte is an American retired soccer player who in 1993 led the USISL in scoring. He played professionally in the American Professional Soccer League and USISL.

In 1990, Rodarte signed with the Colorado Foxes of the American Professional Soccer League. He played both the 1990 and 1991 season with the Foxes. In 1992, he moved to the El Paso Patriots of the USISL, leading the league in scoring. He continued to play for the Patriots until 1999.
