= Houston Hotshots =

- Team logo (1994–2001, 2015)
- Full name: Houston Hotshots
- Founded: 1994; 2015 (new team)
- Dissolved: 2001 (past team); 2017 (new team)
- Ground: Northwest Indoor Soccer Houston, Texas
- Capacity: 1000
- Owner: William Alsobrook
- Head Coach/General Manager: Rafael Lopez (2015–17).
- League: PASL
- Website: http://www.houstonhotshots.net/
Home colours

The Houston Hotshots were a professional indoor soccer team in Houston, Texas. They play in the Premier Arena Soccer League (PASL) From 1994 to 1997 and 2000–2001, the Houston Hotshots were a full professional indoor soccer team in Houston, Texas. They played in the Continental Indoor Soccer League (CISL) from 1994 to 1997, and moved to the World Indoor Soccer League in 1999 after the CISL folded. The Hotshots folded in early 2001 after failing to attract new investors. On June 28, 2015, William Alsobrook filed the necessary paperwork to revive the club and announced his intention to field a team in the upcoming Premier Arena Soccer League season.

== History ==
They were coached by Chico Borja (1994) and Trevor Dawkins (1995–97 and 1999–2000), and played at the Compaq Center and Reliant Arena. The Hotshots averaged attendance of 5,607 fans per game in six seasons of play. In June 1994, Matt and Shannon Presley became the first husband and wife to play together in a professional soccer game.

In the first official game in the PASL Creighton Brooks scored a hat-trick vs Brownsville Barracudas on December 20, 2015.

== Year-by-year ==
Year	League	Reg. season	Playoffs	Avg. attendance
1994	CISL	6th Eastern 7-21	Opted out of Playoffs	6,492
1995	CISL	4th Southern 8-20	Opted out of Playoffs	5,942
1996	CISL	2nd Eastern 18-10	Lost Championship	7,118
1997	CISL	3rd Eastern 18-10	Lost Championship	6,930
1999	WISL	7th WISL, 6-16	Opted out of Playoffs	3,599
2000	WISL	4th WISL, 10-14	Lost Quarterfinal	2,887
2015/16 Winter	PASL	5th PASL South Central, 1-7	Opted out of Playoffs	100
2016/17 Winter	PASL	4th PASL South Central, 4-4	Opted out of Playoffs	TBD

== Former players ==
- (Iran) Arash Noamouz (1995)
- (England) Paul Dougherty (1996–97)
- (United States) Danny Buttitta (1993-96)

== Awards and honors ==
Championships

- CISL (Runner-up) (2): 1996, 1997

MVP Of the Year

- CISL (1997): Paul Dougherty

Rookie Of the Year

- CISL (1997): Goran Vasic
- WISL (2000): Clint Regier

Coach Of the Year

- CISL (1996): Trevor Dawkins
