= Boca Raton Sabres =

- Founded: 1992
- Dissolved: 1994
- League: USISL

The Boca Raton Sabres were a soccer club based in Boca Raton, Florida, that competed in the USISL.

The Sabres played their first season in 1992. The team made its home debut on May 6, 1992, defeating the Montreal Supra of the Canadian Soccer League 2–1 in an exhibition match. In their maiden season, coach Gerry Queen guided the team to a playoff appearance. Despite struggling with injuries in 1993, the Sabres reached the Division finals, where they lost to the Atlanta Lasers. In 1994, Rafiq Hassan took over as manager.

== Year-by-year ==
Year	Division	League	Reg. season	Playoffs	Open Cup
1992	N/A	USISL	2nd, Southeast	Round 2	Did not enter
1993	N/A	USISL	5th, Southeast	Divisional Finals	Did not enter
1994	3	USISL	5th, Southeast	Did not qualify	Did not enter
