= Orlando Lions =

Defunct American soccer club

The Orlando Lions were an American men's soccer team from Orlando, Florida which existed from 1985 to 1996. Over the years, the Lions competed at both the amateur and professional levels including some seasons as an independent team.

The Lions is a nickname that has persisted in the area in connection with later efforts to bring pro soccer to the area. It is used as a nickname for the current Orlando City SC team, which played in the third-tier USL Pro league between 2010 and 2014, and now plays in Major League Soccer.

== ASL/APSL ==
Founded in 1985, the Orlando Lions joined the third incarnation of the American Soccer League in 1988. The team joined the American Professional Soccer League in 1990 when the ASL merged with the Western Alliance. They merged with the Fort Lauderdale Strikers after the 1990 season. The club played in Orlando, Florida.

=== Year-by-year ===
Year	Division	League	Reg. season	Playoffs	Open Cup
1988	N/A	ASL	4th, Southern	Did not qualify	Did not enter
1989	N/A	ASL	4th, Southern	Did not qualify	Did not enter
1990	N/A	APSL	3rd, ASL South	Did not qualify	Did not enter

==== Yearly average attendance ====
- 1988 – 2,736
- 1989 – 2,761
- 1990 – not available

== USISL ==
The second Orlando Lions were a soccer club based in Orlando, Florida. The team began in the USISL and, in 1995, moved to the USISL Premier League.

=== Year-by-year ===
Year	Division	League	Reg. season	Playoffs	Open Cup
1992	N/A	USISL	1st, Southeast	Sizzling Six	Did not enter
1993	N/A	USISL	1st, Southeast	Final	Did not enter
1993/94	N/A	USISL Indoor	4th, Southeast	Did not qualify	N/A
1994	3	USISL	4th, Southeast	Divisional Semifinals	Did not enter
1994/95	N/A	USISL Indoor	3rd, North/South	Did not qualify	N/A
1995	"4"	USISL Premier League	8th, Eastern	Did not qualify	Did not enter
1995/96	N/A	USISL Indoor	2nd, Southeast	Did not qualify	N/A
1995	"4"	USISL Premier League	2nd, Southern	Did not qualify	Did not enter
1996	4	USISL Premier League	2nd EC Southern	unknown	Did not enter

=== Coaches ===
- (United States) Mark Dillon (1985–1988, 1992–1993)
- (Scotland) John Higgins (1988–1989)
- (United States) Gary Hindley (1989–1990)
- (United States) Sergio Mora (1995)
- (United States) Steve Lions (1995–96) Indoor

=== Yearly awards ===
USISL MVP

- 1992: Sheldon Lee

USISL Top Scorer

- 1993: Sheldon Lee

USISL All-Star

- 1992: Robin Chan
- 1993: Sheldon Lee, David Mackey

USISL Coach of the Year

- 1993: Mark Dillon
