= Continental Indoor Soccer League =

Indoor soccer league

- Founded: 1989
- First season: 1993
- Folded: 1997
- Country: United States; Mexico
- Number of clubs: 15
- Last champions: Seattle SeaDogs
- Most championships: Monterrey La Raza (2 titles)
- Broadcaster(s): Prime Network; FSN Southwest

The Continental Indoor Soccer League (CISL) was a professional indoor soccer league that played from 1993 to 1997.

== History ==
In the summer of 1989, Dr. Jerry Buss, the owner of the Los Angeles Lakers and California Sports, told his executive Vice President, Ron Weinstein, he was closing the doors on the Los Angeles Lazers of the Major Indoor Soccer League (MISL) and that if he ever wanted to "create a professional indoor soccer league that played in the summer months, out from under the shadow of the NBA, NFL, NHL, NCAA Football and NCAA Basketball", he would support the endeavor. One year later, in late 1990, Ron Weinstein incorporated the Continental Indoor Soccer League with his business partner Jorge Ragde. They drafted all the necessary franchise documents to bring the league into fruition and create what was the first professional sports league to operate under the "single entity" formula in 1991. Buss later took a leave of absence from the project and was temporarily replaced by Phoenix Suns owner, Jerry Colangelo, who joined as one of the inaugural members of the league.

Colangelo and Weinstein took the lead role in working to attract NBA and NHL owners. Through Buss's and Colangelo's cooperative efforts they orchestrated two CISL meetings in conjunction with their own NBA Board of Governors meetings. The first was held in 1991 in Marina Del Rey and the second in New York City in 1992. CISL was launched with 7 teams committed to begin playing in the summer of 1993 with another eight contracted for 1994.

Monterrey La Raza made the CISL the first US league to have a team from Mexico participating. In 1995, a second Mexican team entered the league, the Mexico City Toros.

By the end of the 1995 season, the third year of the league, 50% of the teams were already profitable. In 1996, CISL signed a three-year agreement with FOX Sports to televise a game of the week nationally in prime time. That same year, the Indianapolis (later Indiana) Twisters became the next expansion franchise admitted to the league.

In the fall of 1997, the surprising demise of the league took place primarily due to differences of direction between the NBA/NHL owners and three of the leagues non NBA/NHL teams: Dallas, Portland and Houston. They collaborated in an effort to leave the CISL and form their own league, The Premier Soccer Alliance. It is the opinion of many executives within the sports world, that indoor soccer has never again reached the pinnacle of the CISL since operations formally ceased in the winter of 1998.

The Continental Indoor Soccer League Championship Trophy was titled the "Lawrence Trophy" named in honor of the commissioner and founder's father, Lawrence Albert Weinstein.

== Teams ==
Team	NBA/NHL Affiliate	City/Area	Arena
Los Angeles United/Anaheim Splash	Los Angeles Lakers/Private owner	Los Angeles, California/Anaheim, California	The Forum/Arrowhead Pond of Anaheim
Arizona Sandsharks	Phoenix Suns	Phoenix, Arizona	America West Arena
Carolina Vipers	Private owner	Charlotte, North Carolina	Independence Arena
Dallas Sidekicks	Dallas Mavericks	Dallas	Reunion Arena
Detroit Neon/Safari	Detroit Pistons	Auburn Hills, Michigan	The Palace of Auburn Hills
Houston Hotshots	Private owner	Houston	The Summit
Indianapolis/Indiana Twisters	Private owner	Indianapolis	Market Square Arena
Las Vegas Dustdevils	Private owner	Las Vegas	MGM Grand Garden Arena/Thomas & Mack Center
Monterrey La Raza	Private owner	Monterrey, Nuevo León	Gimnasio Del Tec de Monterrey
Mexico Toros	Private owner	Mexico City	Palacio de los Deportes
Portland Pride	Private owner	Portland, Oregon	Memorial Coliseum/Moda Center
Pittsburgh Stingers	Pittsburgh Penguins	Pittsburgh	Pittsburgh Civic Arena
Sacramento Knights	Sacramento Kings	Sacramento, California	ARCO Arena
San Diego Sockers	Private owner	San Diego	San Diego Sports Arena
San Jose Grizzlies	San Jose Sharks	San Jose, California	San Jose Arena
Seattle SeaDogs	Seattle SuperSonics	Seattle	Seattle Center Coliseum/KeyArena
Washington Warthogs	Washington Capitals	Landover, Maryland	USAir Arena

== Lawrence Trophy Champions ==
Season	Champion	Series	Runner-up
1993	Dallas Sidekicks	2–1	San Diego Sockers
1994	Las Vegas Dustdevils	2–1	Dallas Sidekicks
1995	Monterrey La Raza	2–1	Sacramento Knights
1996	Monterrey La Raza	2–0	Houston Hotshots
1997	Seattle SeaDogs	2–0	Houston Hotshots

=== By Team ===
Team	Championships	Runner up	Champions	Runner-up
Monterrey La Raza	2	0	1995, 1996	
Dallas Sidekicks	1	1	1993	1994
Las Vegas Dustdevils	1	0	1994	
Seattle SeaDogs	1	0	1997	
Houston Hotshots	0	2		1996, 1997
Sacramento Knights	0	1		1995
San Diego Sockers	0	1		1993

== Annual awards ==
=== Most Valuable Player ===
- 1993: (Brazil) Tatu, Dallas Sidekicks
- 1994: (Brazil) Tatu, Dallas Sidekicks
- 1995: (United States) Preki, San Jose Grizzlies
- 1996: (Brazil) Tatu, Dallas Sidekicks
- 1997: (England) Paul Dougherty, Houston Hotshots

=== Goalkeeper of the Year ===
- 1993: (United States) Joe Papaleo, Dallas Sidekicks
- 1994: (United States) Antonio Cortes, San Diego Sockers
- 1995: (Wales) Mike Dowler, Sacramento Knights
- 1996: (Mexico) Juan de la O, Seattle SeaDogs
- 1997: (Mexico) Juan de la O, Seattle SeaDogs

=== Coach of the Year ===
- 1993: (England) Gordon Jago, Dallas Sidekicks
- 1994: (United States) George Fernandez, Anaheim Splash
- 1995: (Germany) Erich Geyer, Monterrey La Raza
- 1996: (England) Trevor Dawkins, Houston Hotshots
- 1997: (United States) Fernando Clavijo, Seattle SeaDogs

=== Rookie of the Year ===
- 1993: (United States) Marco Lopez, Monterrey La Raza
- 1994: (Nigeria) John Olu–Molomo, San Diego Sockers
- 1995: (United States) Mark Chung, San Diego Sockers
- 1996: (Chile) Carlos Farias, San Diego Sockers
- 1997: (Mexico) Guillermo Castaneda, Washington Warthogs

=== Defender of the Year ===
- 1993: (United States) Sean Bowers, Sacramento Knights
- 1994: (Scotland) Ralph Black, Anaheim Splash
- 1995: (United States) Danny Pena, Sacramento Knights
- 1996: (United States) Troy Snyder, Washington Warthogs
- 1997: (Mexico) Genoni Martinez, Monterrey La Raza

=== Playoff MVP ===
- 1993: (Brazil) Tatu, Dallas Sidekicks
- 1994: (Canada) Branko Šegota, Las Vegas Dustdevils
- 1995: (Brazil) Zizinho, Monterrey La Raza
- 1996: (Mexico) Raul Salas, Monterrey La Raza
- 1997: (Mexico) Juan de la O, Seattle SeaDogs
