= Florida ThunderCats =

- Florida ThunderCats logo
- Full name: Florida ThunderCats
- Founded: 1998; 28 years ago
- Dissolved: 1999; 27 years ago
- Ground: National Car Rental Center
- Capacity: 19,000
- Manager: (Uruguay) Fernando Clavijo
- League: NPSL

The Florida ThunderCats were an indoor soccer club based in Fort Lauderdale, Florida that competed in the National Professional Soccer League. The team folded after one season.

== Year-by-year ==
Year	League	Reg. season	Playoffs	Avg. attendance
1998–99	NPSL	4th, American East	Did not qualify	2,402
