= Willamette Valley Firebirds =

American soccer team

Willamette Valley Firebirds were an American soccer team that played in Corvallis, Oregon.

They began as the Palo Alto Firebirds based in Palo Alto, California, winning both the Pacific Conference and the USISL title in 1992. Former San Jose Earthquakes player Joe Silveira served as manager during the team's inaugural season. They moved to San Jose, California in 1994 and became the Silicon Valley Firebirds and played at PAL Stadium. They were renamed the Portland Firebirds in 1995 after they moved to Portland, Oregon. The next year they moved to Corvallis and became the Willamette Valley Firebirds.

== Year-by-year ==
Year	Division	League	Reg. season	Playoffs	Open Cup
1992	N/A	USISL	1st, Pacific	Champion	Did not enter
1993	N/A	USISL	2nd, Pacific	Divisional Semifinals	Did not enter
1994	3	USISL	6th, Pacific	Did not qualify	Did not enter
1995	3	USISL Pro League	4th, Northwest	Did not qualify	Did not qualify
1996	"4"	USISL Premier League	5th, Western Northern	Did not qualify	Did not qualify
1997	On Hiatus				
1998	On Hiatus				
1999	"4"	USL PDL	1st, Northwest	3rd Place	Did not qualify
2000	"4"	USL PDL	6th, Northwest	Did not qualify	Did not qualify
