= 2001–02 Rushden & Diamonds F.C. season =

Rushden & Diamonds
2001–02 season
- Manager: (England) Brian Talbot
- Stadium: Nene Park
- Third Division: 6th
- Play-offs: Runners-up
- FA Cup: Second round
- League Cup: First round
- Football League Trophy: First round
- Top goalscorer: Onandi Lowe (19)

During the 2001–02 English football season, Rushden & Diamonds competed in the Third Division.

== Season summary ==
In their first season ever in the Football League, Rushden & Diamonds finished 6th, qualifying for the play-offs. They eliminated Rochdale to reach the final, but lost 3–1 to Cheltenham Town.

== Kit ==
Rushden & Diamonds' kit was manufactured by Fila and sponsored by Dr. Martens.

== First-team squad ==
Squad at end of season

Note: Flags indicate national team as defined under FIFA eligibility rules; some limited exceptions apply. Players may hold more than one non-FIFA nationality.

| No. | Pos. | Nation | Player |
|---|---|---|---|
| 1 | GK | ENG | Billy Turley |
| 2 | DF | ENG | Tarkan Mustafa |
| 3 | DF | ENG | Paul Underwood |
| 4 | MF | IRL | Michael McElhatton |
| 5 | DF | WAL | Mark Peters |
| 7 | MF | ENG | Garry Butterworth |
| 8 | MF | AUS | Jon Brady |
| 9 | FW | ENG | Scott Partridge |
| 10 | FW | ENG | Duane Darby |
| 11 | MF | ENG | Andy Burgess |
| 12 | FW | ENG | Brett Angell |
| 15 | MF | ENG | Gary Mills |
| 16 | GK | WAL | Tony Pennock |
| 17 | DF | ENG | Gary Setchell |
| 18 | DF | SCO | Stuart Gray (Note: Gray was born in Harrogate, England, but also qualified to represent Scotland internationally through his father and represented Scotland at U-21 level.) |
| 19 | FW | FRA | Raphaël Jacquel |
| 20 | FW | JAM | Paul Hall (Note: Hall was born in Manchester, England, but also qualified to represent Jamaica internationally and made his international debut for Jamaica in 1997.) |

| No. | Pos. | Nation | Player |
|---|---|---|---|
| 21 | MF | ENG | Ritchie Hanlon |
| 22 | DF | ENG | Andrew Sambrook |
| 23 | DF | ENG | Brett Solkhon |
| 24 | GK | ENG | Adam Dowell |
| 25 | FW | WAL | Robert Duffy |
| 26 | DF | ENG | John Dempster |
| 27 | MF | ENG | Daniel Talbot |
| 28 | MF | ENG | David Bell (Note: Bell was born in Wellingborough, England, but also qualified to represent the Republic of Ireland internationally and represented the Republic of Ireland at U-21 and B level.) |
| 29 | MF | ENG | Stuart Wardley |
| 30 | DF | ENG | Delroy Gordon |
| 31 | FW | JAM | Onandi Lowe |
| 32 | DF | ENG | Chris Tedder |
| 33 | DF | IRL | David Bell |
| 34 | GK | WAL | Alex Davies |
| 35 | DF | NIR | Barry Hunter |
| 36 | DF | ENG | Andy Tillson |
| 37 | GK | ENG | Stuart Naylor |

=== Left club during season ===
Note: Flags indicate national team as defined under FIFA eligibility rules; some limited exceptions apply. Players may hold more than one non-FIFA nationality.

| No. | Pos. | Nation | Player |
|---|---|---|---|
| 4 | MF | IRL | Michael McElhatton (on loan to Chester City) |
| 6 | DF | ENG | Ray Warburton (to Boston United) |
| 9 | FW | ENG | Justin Jackson (to Doncaster Rovers) |
| 12 | MF | ENG | Jim Rodwell (to Boston United) |
| 14 | DF | IRL | Shaun Carey (Note: Carey was born in Kettering, England, but also qualified to represent the Republic of Ireland internationally and represented the Republic of Ireland at U-21 level.) (on loan to Stevenage Borough) |
| 19 | FW | ENG | Warren Patmore (to Woking) |
| 19 | FW | ENG | Christian Lee (on loan from Farnborough Town) |
| 19 | FW | ENG | Peter Thomson (on loan from Luton Town) |

| No. | Pos. | Nation | Player |
|---|---|---|---|
| 19 | FW | ENG | Stuart Douglas (on loan from Luton Town) |
| 20 | MF | ENG | Simon Wormull (to Stevenage Borough) |
| 21 | MF | ENG | Richard Butcher (to Kettering Town) |
| 22 | DF | ENG | Matty Stowell (to Hampton & Richmond Borough) |
| 24 | FW | FRA | Jean-Michel Sigere (to Stevenage Borough) |
| 29 | FW | ENG | Luke Rowlett (to Tamworth) |
| 31 | FW | ENG | Caleb Folan (Note: Folan was born in Leeds, England, but also qualified to represent the Republic of Ireland internationally through his grandfather and grandmother and represented the Republic of Ireland at B level before making his international debut for the Republic of Ireland national football team in October 2008.) (on loan from Leeds United) |
