= 2002 Football League Third Division play-off final =

Association football match

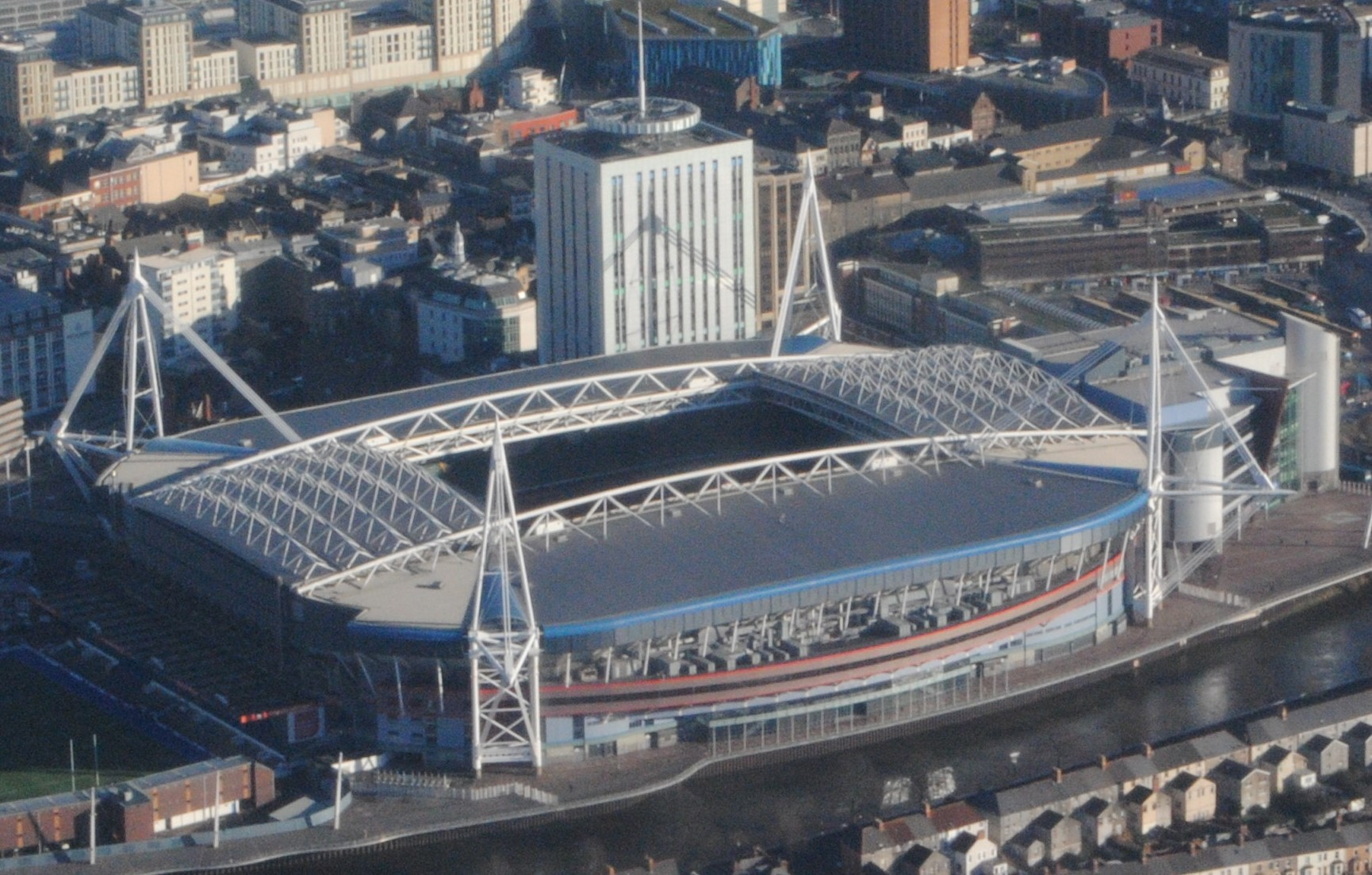
- The Millennium Stadium hosted the final.
- Event: 2001–02 Football League Third Division
Cheltenham Town	Rushden & Diamonds
3	1
- Date: 6 May 2002
- Venue: Millennium Stadium, Cardiff
- Man of the Match: Martin Devaney
- Referee: Anthony Leake
- Attendance: 24,368

The 2002 Football League Third Division play-off final was an association football match played on 6 May 2002 at the Millennium Stadium, Cardiff, between Cheltenham Town and Rushden & Diamonds. The match determined the fourth and final team to gain promotion from the Football League Third Division, English football's fourth tier, to the Second Division. The top three teams of the 2001–02 Third Division season gained automatic promotion to the Second Division, while those placed from fourth to seventh in the table took part in play-offs. The winners of the play-off semi-finals competed for the final place for the 2002–03 season in the Second Division. Cheltenham Town finished in fourth place while Rushden & Diamonds ended the season in sixth position. Hartlepool United and Rochdale were the losing semi-finalists, being defeated by Cheltenham and Rushden respectively.

The referee for the match, played in front of 24,368 spectators, was Anthony Leake. Neither side dominated the early stages of the match, but in the 27th minute, Cheltenham took the lead. Martin Devaney struck the ball towards the Rushden goal, where it was defended by Scott Partridge. His clearance went back to Devaney who struck the ball past Rushden's goalkeeper, Billy Turley from a tight angle. Within 14 seconds, the score was level at 1–1 as Paul Hall beat three Cheltenham defenders before shooting past Steve Book. Four minutes into the second half, Julian Alsop headed Anthony Griffin's cross goal-bound, and despite the ball being blocked by Andy Tillson, Alsop tapped it into the net to put Cheltenham back into the lead. In the 80th minute, substitute Neil Grayson's curling shot struck the Rushden goalpost but John Finnigan scored from the rebound. The match ended 3–1, and Cheltenham were promoted to the Second Division.

Rushden & Diamonds ended their following season as champions of the Third Division and secured automatic promotion to the Second Division. Cheltenham Town's next season saw them finish in 21st position in the Second Division which meant they were relegated back to the Third Division for the 2003–04 season.

== Route to the final ==
Football League Third Division final table, leading positions
Pos	Team	Pld	W	D	L	GF	GA	GD	Pts
1	Plymouth Argyle	46	31	9	6	71	28	+43	102
2	Luton Town	46	30	7	9	96	48	+48	97
3	Mansfield Town	46	24	7	15	72	60	+12	79
4	Cheltenham Town	46	21	15	10	66	49	+17	78
5	Rochdale	46	21	15	10	65	52	+13	78
6	Rushden & Diamonds	46	20	13	13	69	53	+16	73
7	Hartlepool United	46	20	11	15	74	48	+26	71

Cheltenham Town finished the regular 2001–02 season in fourth place in the Football League Third Division, the fourth tier of the English football league system, two positions ahead of Rushden & Diamonds. Both therefore missed out on the three automatic places for promotion to the Second Division and instead took part in the play-offs to determine the fourth promoted team. Cheltenham Town finished one point behind Mansfield Town (who were promoted in third place), nineteen behind Luton Town (who were promoted in second place), and twenty-four behind league winners Plymouth Argyle. Rushden & Diamonds ended the season five points behind Cheltenham Town.

Rushden & Diamonds faced Rochdale in their play-off semi-final with the first match of the two-legged tie taking place at Nene Park, Rushden's home ground, on 27 April 2002. Lee McEvilly put the visitors ahead on eight minutes before a header from Stuart Wardley levelled the match in the 34th minute. Eleven minutes after half-time, Paul Simpson scored from distance with a curling shot before Rushden saw a potential equalising goal from Onandi Lowe disallowed for a foul. Garry Butterworth then scored for Rochdale in the 72nd minute from the edge of the penalty area, and the match ended 2–2. The second leg of the semi-final took place three days later at Spotland in Rochdale. After a goalless first half, Mark Peters scored an own goal when his backpass rolled into the Rushden goal to give Rochdale the lead. Immediately after the restart, Butterworth's pass found Lowe who turned and scored to make it 1–1. In the 75th minute, Hall took advantage of a mistake by Griffiths to go round Billy Turley, the Rochdale goalkeeper, and score the deciding goal. Rushden won the match 2–1 and progressed to the play-off final with a 4–3 aggregate victory.

Cheltenham's opposition for their play-off semi-final were Hartlepool United; the first leg was held at Victoria Park in Hartlepool on 27 April 2002. The visiting side started strongly and eventually took the lead in injury time in the first half when Eifion Williams scored with a header from close range. With one minute remaining in the game, Martyn Lee won the ball from Chris Westwood and played it to Neil Grayson who levelled the score, ending the match 1–1. The second leg took place three days later at Whaddon Road in Cheltenham. Paul Arnison put Hartlepool ahead on 17 minutes with a low strike, but Williams equalised ten minutes later with a shot from 25 yards (23 metres). The second half was goalless, which meant the game ended 1–1 and 2–2 on aggregate, resulting in extra time. Grayson came close to scoring with a header, but no goals were scored in the additional period, so a penalty shootout was required to decide the match. Both sides scored four of their first five spot kicks. Alsop then scored to put Cheltenham ahead in sudden death before Ritchie Humphreys' strike hit the crossbar; despite appearing to have crossed the goalline, the shot was adjudged to have missed. Cheltenham progressed to the play-off final with a 5–4 victory on penalties.

== Match ==
=== Background ===
Neither side had appeared in the play-offs prior to this season. Rushden & Diamonds were playing in their maiden Football League season, having been promoted from the Conference as champions in the previous season. Cheltenham had also recently been promoted from non-League football, and had played in the Third Division since the 1999–2000 season. In the matches between the clubs during the regular season, Rushden had won the game at Nene Park 1–0 in September 2001 (the first competitive League meeting ever between the sides), while the return match at Whaddon Road the following March ended in a 1–1 draw. Julian Alsop was Cheltenham's top scorer during the regular season with 24 goals (20 in the league, 4 in the FA Cup), while Tony Naylor had 17 (12 in the league, 5 in the FA Cup). Lowe was Rushden's leading marksman with 19 (all in the league).

Neither side was a clear favourite to win the match, according to bookmakers. The match was shown live in the UK on ITV Sport Channel, one of the last games broadcast by the channel before it closed on 11 May 2002. The referee for the match was Anthony Leake. Both sides adopted a 4–4–2 formation and Cheltenham opted to wear their third-choice kit which was yellow, in preference to their "unlucky" orange strip.

=== Summary ===
The match kicked off around 3 p.m. on 6 May 2002 in front of 24,368 spectators at the Millennium Stadium in Cardiff. Neither side dominated the early stages of the match, but in the 27th minute, Cheltenham took the lead. Martin Devaney struck the ball towards the Rushden goal where it was cleared by Scott Partridge. The ball went back to Devaney, who struck it past Rushden's goalkeeper Turley from a tight angle. Within 14 seconds, the score was level as Paul Hall beat three Cheltenham defenders before shooting past Steve Book to make it 1–1.

Neither side made any personnel changes during the half-time interval, and the second half commenced with Cheltenham dominating. Four minutes in, Julian Alsop headed Anthony Griffin's cross goal-bound and despite the ball being blocked by Andy Tillson, Alsop tapped it into the net to put Cheltenham back into the lead. Alsop then missed a chance when he headed wide, before Cheltenham saw claims for a penalty denied after it appeared that Stuart Gray had handled the ball in the Rushden penalty area. In the 69th minute, Rushden made two substitutions, with Jon Brady and Brett Angell coming on to replace Gray and Partridge. Devaney was then substituted with an injury in the 75th minute and replaced by Neil Grayson. Five minutes later, his curling shot struck the Rushden goalpost, but John Finnigan scored from the rebound. The match ended 3–1 and Cheltenham were promoted to the Second Division.

=== Details ===
6 May 2002
15:00 BST

Cheltenham Town	3–1	Rushden & Diamonds
Devaney 27'; Alsop 49'; Finnigan 80'	Report	Hall 28'

Millennium Stadium, Cardiff
Attendance: 24,368
Referee: Anthony Leake

GK	1	Steve Book
RB	15	Richard Walker
CB	14	Anthony Griffin
CB	2	Michael Duff
LB	3	Jamie Victory
RM	8	Mark Yates
CM	27	Lee Williams
CM	28	John Finnigan
LM	21	Martin Devaney	(substituted off) 75'
ST	26	Tony Naylor
CF	19	Julian Alsop
Substitutes:
GK	21	Carl Muggleton
DF	17	Neil Howarth
MF	22	Martyn Lee
FW	29	Nathan Tyson
FW	9	Neil Grayson	(substituted on) 75'
Manager:
Steve Cotterill

GK	1	Billy Turley
CB	36	Andy Tillson
CB	3	Paul Underwood
CB	5	Mark Peters
RM	29	Stuart Wardley
CM	20	Paul Hall
CM	2	Tarkan Mustafa
CM	18	Stuart Gray (c)	(substituted off) 69'
LM	7	Garry Butterworth
CF	31	Onandi Lowe
CF	9	Scott Partridge	(substituted off) 69'
Substitutes:
GK	16	Tony Pennock
DF	17	Gary Setchell
DF	35	Barry Hunter
MF	8	Jon Brady	(substituted on) 69'
FW	12	Brett Angell	(substituted on) 69'
Manager:
Brian Talbot

== Post-match ==
Steve Cotterill, the Cheltenham manager, suggested the play-off route to promotion was his preference: "I always said this is the way to go up ... Cheltenham will never have another season like this". His counterpart, Brian Talbot admitted his side was second-best and that Cheltenham "edged it and deserved to win ... On the day the best team has won and we have got to reproduce it next season." Cheltenham became the eleventh consecutive team to win a final at the Millennium Stadium after being allocated the North End dressing room. Devaney was named as man of the match.

Rushden & Diamonds ended their following season as champions of the Third Division and secured automatic promotion to the Second Division. Cotterill moved to Stoke City by the end of May 2002, replacing Guðjón Þórðarson who was sacked four days after leading Stoke to promotion in the 2002 Football League Second Division play-off final. Cheltenham Town's next season saw them finish in 21st position in the Second Division which meant they were relegated back to the Third Division for the 2003–04 season.
