= 2003–04 Rushden & Diamonds F.C. season =

Rushden & Diamonds
2003–04 season
- Chairman: (England) Max Griggs
- Manager: (England) Brian Talbot (Northern Ireland) Barry Hunter (player-manager) (England) Ernie Tippett
- Stadium: Nene Park
- Second Division: 22nd (relegated)
- FA Cup: First round
- League Cup: First round
- Football League Trophy: Second round
- Top goalscorer: Onandi Lowe (15)

During the 2003–04 English football season, Rushden & Diamonds competed in the Second Division.

== Season summary ==
Despite chairman and owner Max Griggs declaring his intention to sell the club in October, by Christmastime Rushden & Diamonds were two points off the play-off spaces. However, their next 11 games saw a return of only 8 points, leaving the club in relegation peril. This came amidst the background of increasing financial woes, which culminated in four key players leaving on March's transfer deadline day, most notably top scorer Onandi Lowe. Manager Brian Talbot had already departed to take over at Oldham Athletic, leaving Barry Hunter to take over as player-manager. Ernie Tippett took over as permanent manager with 3 games left of the season, but lost all 3, condemning the club to an immediate return to the fourth tier.

== Kit ==
Rushden & Diamonds switched kit manufacturers to Errea. Dr. Martens remained kit sponsor.

== First-team squad ==
Squad at end of season

Note: Flags indicate national team as defined under FIFA eligibility rules; some limited exceptions apply. Players may hold more than one non-FIFA nationality.

No.	Pos.	Nation	Player
1	GK	ENG	Billy Turley
4	MF	ENG	Gary Mills
5	DF	ENG	Andy Edwards
6	DF	NIR	Barry Hunter
7	MF	ENG	Stuart Wardley
8	MF	ENG	Ritchie Hanlon
9	FW	VIN	Rodney Jack
12	DF	SCO	Stuart Gray (Note: Gray was born in Harrogate, England, but also qualified to represent Scotland internationally through his father and represented Scotland at U-21 level.)
14	DF	ENG	John Dempster
15	DF	ENG	Andrew Sambrook
16	FW	WAL	Robert Duffy

No.	Pos.	Nation	Player
17	GK	IRL	Stephen Gahan
18	MF	ENG	David Bell (Note: Bell was born in Wellingborough, England, but also qualified to represent the Republic of Ireland internationally and represented the Republic of Ireland at U-21 and B level.)
19	MF	ENG	Daniel Talbot
20	FW	ENG	Paul Kitson
21	MF	ENG	Owen Story
23	DF	IRL	David Bell
24	DF	NGA	Magnus Okuonghae (Note: Okuonghae was born in Lagos, Nigeria, but also qualified to represent England internationally and represented England at C level.)
25	FW	DR Congo	Eric Manangu
28	MF	ENG	Marcus Kelly
35	DF	ENG	Leo Roget

=== Left club during season ===
Note: Flags indicate national team as defined under FIFA eligibility rules; some limited exceptions apply. Players may hold more than one non-FIFA nationality.

No.	Pos.	Nation	Player
2	DF	ENG	Marcus Bignot (to Queens Park Rangers)
3	DF	ENG	Paul Underwood (to Luton Town)
10	FW	ENG	Duane Darby (to Shrewsbury Town)
10	FW	JAM	Trevor Benjamin (Note: Benjamin was born in Kettering, England, and represented England at U-21 level, but also qualified to represent Jamaica internationally and made his international debut for Jamaica in November 2002.) (on loan from Leicester City)
10	DF	IRL	Barry Quinn (on loan from Coventry City)
20	DF	WAL	Mark Peters (released)

No.	Pos.	Nation	Player
22	FW	JAM	Paul Hall (Note: Hall was born in Manchester, England, but also qualified to represent Jamaica internationally and made his international debut for Jamaica in 1997.) (to Tranmere Rovers)
31	FW	JAM	Onandi Lowe (to Coventry City)
35	GK	AUS	Andy Petterson (to Southend United)
35	GK	RSA	Paul Evans (released)
35	FW	ENG	Adebayo Akinfenwa (released)
36	GK	ENG	Jamie Ashdown (on loan from Reading)
