= Jon Brady =

Australian soccer player and manager

Personal information
- Full name: Jon Edmund Alexander Brady
- Date of birth: 14 January 1975 (age 51)
- Place of birth: Newcastle, New South Wales, Australia
- Height: 5 ft 10 in (1.78 m)
- Positions: Winger; centre-forward; wing-back

Team information
- Current team: Port Vale (manager)

Youth career
- 1991: Adamstown Rosebud

Senior career*
Years	Team	Apps	(Gls)
1991–1993	Brentford	0	(0)
1993–1994	Swansea City	0	(0)
1994–1995	Wycombe Wanderers	0	(0)
1994	Mjølner	12	(6)
1994–1998	Hayes	158	(19)
1998–2002	Rushden & Diamonds	127	(17)
2002	Woking	12	(1)
2002–2003	Chester City	33	(2)
2003–2005	Stevenage Borough	54	(3)
2005–2006	Hereford United	19	(0)
2006–2007	Cambridge United	53	(4)
2007	→ Kidderminster Harriers (loan)	9	(0)
2007–2008	Kettering Town		
2008–2009	Brackley Town		
Total		477	(52)

International career
1990	Australia U17		

Managerial career
- 2009–2015: Brackley Town
- 2021–2024: Northampton Town
- 2026–: Port Vale
- * Club domestic league appearances and goals

Jon Edmund Alexander Brady (born 14 January 1975) is an Australian soccer coach and former player who is the manager of EFL League Two club Port Vale.

Brady was a youth player with Adamstown Rosebud when he was spotted by English club Brentford. He went on to spend time with Swansea City and Wycombe Wanderers, though it was at Norwegian club Mjølner where he made his senior debut in 1994. He returned to England the following year to join non-League club Hayes. He was converted from centre-forward to playing on the wings and was a key player in the club's Isthmian League Premier Division title-winning campaign in 1995–96. Sold to Rushden & Diamonds for £40,000 in 1998, he won the Football Conference with the club in 2000–01. He played in the Football League Third Division the following season, taking his final tally at the club to 166 appearances. He then returned to non-League football with spells at Woking, Chester City, Stevenage Borough, Hereford United, Cambridge United, Kidderminster Harriers (on loan), Kettering Town and Brackley Town. He won the Conference North with Kettering Town in 2007–08.

He began his coaching career with Brackley Town, initially serving as caretaker manager in March 2009. He spent the next six-and-a-half years in charge, winning the Southern Premier Division in 2011–12, the Northamptonshire Senior Cup three times, and the Maunsell Cup twice. He resigned in September 2015 and went on to coach in the Academy at Northampton Town. He took caretaker charge of the first team in February 2021 and was given the job permanently despite relegation into League Two. They were beaten in the play-off semi-finals in his first full season in charge, before securing automatic promotion in 2022–23. He took the team to mid-table in League One and resigned in December 2024. He was appointed as the head coach at Port Vale in January 2026.

== Playing career ==
Brady was born and raised in Australia. He came through at Adamstown Rosebud. He finished runner-up to Ante Milicic in the National Youth League Player of the Year award in 1991. He joined Brentford after being scouted playing for the Northern New South Wales team in a tournament in Denmark as a young teenager. He had been playing senior men's football in Australia at the age of 15 and had to finish his schooling before his parents allowed him to go to Brentford. He went on to join Swansea City, where he was punched in a reserve game by the first-team manager.

He spent the 1994–95 season with Wycombe Wanderers without making a first-team appearance. Brady joined Hayes via a spell in Norway with Mjølner where he scored six goals in 12 games. He played 189 games for the Missioners in all competitions, scoring 26 goals. Nicknamed "Skippy", he was converted from a centre-forward to a wing-back by manager Terry Brown. He was part of the team that won the Isthmian League Premier Division in 1995–96, before transferring to Rushden & Diamonds in the summer of 1998 for a fee of £40,000. He earned his UEFA B Licence at the age of 23.

Brady was a Football Conference champion with Rushden & Diamonds in 2000–01, scoring the winner at Chester City on the final day of the season to make promotion mathematically certain. The following season saw him appear on the losing side for the Diamonds against Cheltenham Town in the play-off final at the Millennium Stadium. He said his time at Nene Park was the highlight of his playing career.

After a brief spell at Woking, he joined Chester City. He once again suffered play-off disappointment, losing the inaugural Football Conference play-offs at the semi-final stage to Doncaster Rovers. He was released from his Chester contract during their 2003–04 title winning campaign in order to join the coaching staff of Arsenal, but soon resumed his playing career with Stevenage Borough.

He played in the 2005 Conference play-off final defeat to Carlisle United at the Britannia Stadium. Brady signed for Hereford United on 11 June 2005. On 5 January 2006, he joined Cambridge United on a free transfer after telling Bulls manager Graham Turner he could no longer take the long commute from his Northampton home.

He subsequently joined Cambridge United, before a loan spell with Kidderminster Harriers in March 2007. He signed for Conference North side Kettering Town in June 2007. Kettering were promoted under the stewardship of manager Mark Cooper. He scored six goals in 28 games for Kettering.

He later lamented that "I did not fulfil my own potential" as a player, though he did achieve his coaching badges and ran his own business delivering PE in schools throughout Northamptonshire and Milton Keynes. The company employed a staff of 40, though he sold it off in order to focus on his career in management. He agreed to play three games for Brackley Town and eventually went on to manage the club. He was also offered a trial by homeclub club Newcastle Jets in 2009.

== Style of play ==
Brady began his career as a centre-forward, before being converted to wing-back. He was an excellent crosser and dead-ball kicker.

== Coaching career ==
=== Brackley Town ===
Brady was appointed manager of Southern League Premier Division club Brackley Town on a caretaker basis in March 2009 to run until the end of the 2008–09 season. He was given the job permanently on 17 April. The team qualified for the play-offs at the end of the 2009–10 campaign, but were beaten by Nuneaton Town at the semi-final stage. Brackley won the Southern Football League Premier Division title by an eight-point margin at the end of the 2011–12 season.

He was named Conference North Manager of the Month in August 2012 for overseeing impressive wins over Altrincham and Corby Town. He retained the award the following month after Brackley extended their unbeaten run to nine matches, of which eight were victories. Brackley qualified for the play-offs at the end of the 2012–13 season, though missed out on back-to-back promotions with a 1–0 defeat to FC Halifax Town in the final.

Brackley defeated League One side Gillingham by one goal to nil in the first round of the FA Cup on 18 November 2013 to reach the second round for the first time in their history, having earned a replay with a 1–1 draw at Priestfield Stadium nine days previously. Brackley finished 18th at the end of the 2014–15 campaign after facing a reduced playing budget, only avoiding relegation by winning their final three games. On 6 September 2015, Brady stepped down as manager with the club 19th in the table.

"You are arranging pre-match meals, arranging the coach. You are thinking, if we put a tea bar next to that turnstile, that might help. You are always looking at ways to bring in revenue. It was all about trying to find ways off the pitch to get us resources on it."

— Brady talked about his time as a non-League manager in July 2025.

=== Northampton Town ===
Brady joined Northampton Town as U16 coach in 2016 and was promoted to U18 coach in 2017. He led the side to the EFL Youth Alliance title in 2018.

Following the sacking of Keith Curle on 10 February 2021, Brady was placed in temporary charge of the first team. On 4 March, it was confirmed that Brady would remain in charge of the first-team until the end of the 2020–21 season. In the penultimate match of the season, Northampton were beaten 3–0 by Blackpool, a result that saw Northampton immediately relegated back to League Two. Despite the relegation, however, Brady was appointed permanent manager on 8 May after having won five of his 20 games in charge. He convinced the club to bring in Martin Foyle as head of recruitment and allow him to take the players on a three-day leadership programme with the British Army.

Following two defeats at the start of October, Brady held a team meeting and instructed his players to "sort things out" according to right-back Aaron McGowan, with the result being a winning streak. Brady and his side were in a good position for an immediate return to the third tier throughout the 2021–22 campaign, with the automatic promotion race going down to the final day. Despite beating Barrow 3–1, Bristol Rovers beat already-relegated Scunthorpe United 7–0 to move into third place on goals scored having needed to better Northampton's result by a five-goal margin. Northampton were subsequently defeated over two legs by Mansfield Town in the play-offs. Brady later said he had to "reshape the psychology, the motivation, the emotions for the players" following the disappointment. He also had to contend with the departures of club captain Fraser Horsfall, and strikers Danny Rose and Benny Ashley-Seal.

Brady aimed to push for promotion again and signed Danny Hylton from Luton Town to lead the front line. More significant additions, however, turned out to be loanees Marc Leonard and Kieron Bowie, from Brighton & Hove Albion and Fulham, who would actually spend the next two seasons on loan at the club. Sam Hoskins finished as top-scorer with 22 goals after Brady coached him to improve his timing in arriving in the box. Brady was nominated for the League Two Manager of the Month award after his side won both of their league fixtures in November. He signed a new rolling contract in January, as did his coaching team of Colin Calderwood, Marc Richards and James Alger. A series of injuries in the first-team led to him recruiting players such as Paul Osew and David Norman on minimum wage, as well as play youth team products like Max Dyche. He was awarded the League Two Manager of the Month award for March, having led his side to 13 points from five matches. This came on the strength of four clean sheets despite the ongoing injury crisis. At the end of the 2022–23 season, Northampton were promoted to League One automatically in third place. He praised the team's "tremendous courage and bouncebackability".

He found recruitment difficult in League One due to the presence of big-spending clubs in the division. He was nominated for the November League One Manager of the Month award after overseeing nine points from three league games. In January, Brady renewed his rolling contract with the club on improved terms with the side in ninth position in League One. Town ended the 2023–24 campaign in 14th-place, 16 points clear of the relegation places, which Brady said was his biggest achievement at Sixfields. It made him the first manager in 15 years to lead Northampton for a full League One campaign and avoid relegation. He considered walking away from the club after key players Shaun McWilliams, Louis Appéré and Sam Sherring rejected contract offers for moves elsewhere, though he was persuaded to stay by chairman Kelvin Thomas.

On 5 December 2024, Brady resigned as Northampton manager with the club in the relegation zone, following a run of six matches without a win. It came two days after he had spoken of his pride in the season-by-season progress shown by Northampton on the milestone of him reaching 200 games in charge. He confirmed that it was his decision as he had "achieved everything we set out to do", claiming that the team had gained "223 points over three seasons" and that he had earned "the right to go after something bigger". His resignation came as a surprise to pundits and supporters, who speculated that he needed a break following a lengthy spell with the club struggling with long-term injuries and a short-term dip in form. His assistant, Ian Sampson, who subsequently became caretaker manager, also expressed his shock at Brady's decision to leave.

=== Port Vale ===
Brady was strongly linked to vacant management positions at Bristol Rovers, Barrow and Port Vale. During his time out of the game he gained a diploma in Football Management and a leaders' course from the League Managers Association and spent six weeks with Villarreal. He was appointed as the manager at Port Vale on an 18-month contract on 6 January 2026. He found that Ronan Curtis and Devante Cole, the club's top assist and goal scorers respectively, had already agreed moves away from the club before he arrived at Vale Park. Nevertheless, he oversaw back-to-back wins in his first two games in charge, both cup fixtures, and Ben Waine said he brought "passion and positivity" to the club. Waine went on to score both of Vale's goals in the fourth and fifth rounds to take the Vale into the quarter finals of the FA Cup. Vale were relegated with three games left to play, with Brady commenting that "to score 33 goals in the season is not good enough".

His key signings for the 2026–27 season were Kyle Dempsey, Jasper Moon and Jackson Smith, with a top seven finish expected by pundits and fans. Vale were bottom of the table after failing to win in their first five games with only two goals scored. Brady defended his decision to let veteran striker Jayden Stockley go and bring in Mo Faal on loan after Stockley scored three goals in League One for AFC Wimbledon whilst Faal was sidelined until Christmas with an injury. He was given a vote of confidence by the board after his team ended September in the relegation zone. A sporting director in Micky Moore was appointed at the club, which Brady said was a "really important" positive move. Results improved after Brady switched to a 3–5–2 formation, deploying winger Onel Hernández as a striker. Brady was nominated for October's League Two Manager of the Month after his change in tactics led to ten points from five games.

== Management style ==
Brady has stated that he has an excellent ability to identify the key traits needed in players, saying that "I have two non-negotiables for every position". He does not have a set philosophy as he tries to fit the tactics to the players available to him, saying "I am flexible and adaptable". He also likes finding "rough diamonds or players who have not quite hit their potential" and then "accelerat[ing] a player's development".

== Personal life ==
Brady is married with three children. He ran the London Marathon in 2025 to raise money for the British Forces Foundation, and again in 2026 on behalf of the League Managers Association's children's charities.

== Career statistics ==
=== Playing statistics ===
Appearances and goals by club, season and competition
Club	Season	League			FA Cup		League Cup		Other		Total	
Club	Season	Division	Apps	Goals	Apps	Goals	Apps	Goals	Apps	Goals	Apps	Goals
Brentford	1991–92	Third Division	0	0	0	0	0	0	0	0	0	0
Brentford	1992–93	Second Division	0	0	0	0	0	0	0	0	0	0
Brentford	Total		0	0	0	0	0	0	0	0	0	0
Swansea City	1993–94	Third Division	0	0	0	0	0	0	0	0	0	0
Wycombe Wanderers	1994–95	Third Division	0	0	0	0	0	0	0	0	0	0
Mjølner	1994	Norwegian First Division	12	6	—		—		—		12	6
Hayes	1994–95	Isthmian League; Premier Division	18	6	—		—		—		18	6
Hayes	1995–96	Isthmian League; Premier Division	32	8	—		—		—		32	8
Hayes	1996–97	Football Conference	53	2	—		—		—		53	2
Hayes	1997–98	Football Conference	55	3	—		—		—		55	3
Hayes	Total		158	19	0	0	0	0	0	0	158	19
Rushden & Diamonds	1998–99	Football Conference	37	2	4	2	—		6 (Note: Two appearances one goal in FA Trophy; four appearances in Northamptonshire Senior Cup)	1	47	5
Rushden & Diamonds	1999–2000	Football Conference	27	3	6	2	—		8 (Note: Seven appearances in FA Trophy; one appearance in Conference League Cup)	0	41	5
Rushden & Diamonds	2000–01	Football Conference	41	11	2	0	—		5 (Note: Three appearances in FA Trophy; one appearance in Northamptonshire Senior Cup; one appearance in Conference League Cup)	0	48	11
Rushden & Diamonds	2001–02	Third Division	22	1	2	0	2	0	4 (Note: One appearance in JC Thompson Championship Shield; two appearances two goals in Northamptonshire Cup; one appearance in Division Three play-offs)	2	30	3
Rushden & Diamonds	Total		127	17	14	4	2	0	23	3	166	24
Woking	2002–03	Football Conference	12	1	0	0	—		0	0	12	1
Chester City	2002–03	Football Conference	18	1	2	0	—		3 (Note: One appearance in Football League Trophy; two appearances in Football Conference play-offs)	0	23	1
Chester City	2003–04	Football Conference	15	1	1	0	—		1 (Note: Appearance(s) in Football League Trophy)	0	17	1
Chester City	Total		33	2	3	0	—		4	0	40	2
Stevenage Borough	2003–04	Football Conference	20	0	0	0	—		2 (Note: Appearance(s) in FA Trophy)	1	22	1
Stevenage Borough	2004–05	Conference National	34	3	3	0	—		5 (Note: Two appearances one goal in Conference League Cup; three appearances in Conference National play-offs)	1	42	4
Stevenage Borough	Total		54	3	3	0	—		7	2	64	5
Hereford United	2005–06	Conference National	19	0	2	1	—		3	0	24	1
Cambridge United	2005–06	Conference National	19	1	0	0	—		0	0	19	1
Cambridge United	2006–07	Conference National	34	3	0	0	—		0	0	34	3
Cambridge United	Total		53	4	0	0	—		0	0	53	4
Kidderminster Harriers (loan)	2006–07	Conference National	9	0	0	0	—		0	0	9	0
Career total			477	52	22	5	2	0	37	5	538	62

=== Managerial statistics ===
As of match played 21 November 2026

Managerial record by team and tenure
Team	From	To	Record					Ref.
Team	From	To	P	W	D	L	Win %	Ref.
Brackley Town	1 March 2009	9 September 2015	306	132	76	98	43.1	
Northampton Town	10 February 2021	5 December 2024	200	75	50	75	37.5	
Port Vale	6 January 2026	Present	49	18	11	20	36.7	
Total			554	225	136	193	40.6	

== Honours ==
=== As a player ===
Hayes

- Isthmian League Premier Division: 1995–96

Rushden & Diamonds

- Football Conference: 2000–01

Kettering Town

- Conference North: 2007–08

=== As a manager ===
Brackley Town

- Southern Premier Division: 2011–12
- Northamptonshire Senior Cup: 2010–11, 2011–12, 2014–15
- Maunsell Cup: 2011–12, 2012–13

Northampton Town

- EFL League Two third-place promotion: 2022–23

Individual

- Conference North Manager of the Month: August 2012, September 2012
- EFL League Two Manager of the Month: March 2023
