= Scott Partridge =

English footballer

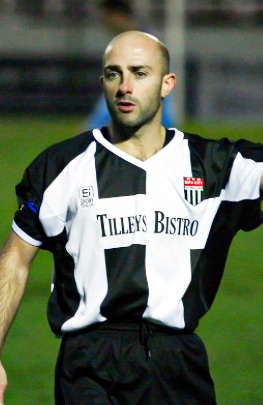
- Partridge playing for Bath City in 2007

Personal information
- Full name: Scott Malcolm Partridge
- Date of birth: 13 October 1974 (age 52)
- Place of birth: Leicester, England
- Height: 5 ft 9 in (1.75 m)
- Positions: Forward; winger

Youth career
- Grimsby Town
- –1992: Bradford City

Senior career*
Years	Team	Apps	(Gls)
1992–1994	Bradford City	5	(0)
1994–1997	Bristol City	57	(7)
1995	→ Torquay United (loan)	5	(2)
1996	→ Plymouth Argyle (loan)	7	(2)
1996	→ Scarborough (loan)	7	(0)
1997–1998	Cardiff City	36	(2)
1998–1999	Torquay United	34	(13)
1999–2001	Brentford	93	(21)
2001–2003	Rushden & Diamonds	44	(5)
2003	→ Exeter City (loan)	4	(2)
2003	Shrewsbury Town	4	(0)
2003–2004	Weymouth	14	(2)
2004–2008	Bath City	138	(68)
2008	Sheffield	23	(19)
2008–2009	Weston-super-Mare	9	(0)
Total		480	(143)
- * Club domestic league appearances and goals

Scott Malcolm Partridge (born 13 October 1974) is an English retired professional footballer who played as a forward in the Football League, most notably for Brentford. In a nomadic league career, he also played League football for Bristol City, Rushden & Diamonds, Torquay United, Cardiff City, Bradford City, Plymouth Argyle, Scarborough and Exeter City. He was described as "an immensely skilful little striker with a wonderful first touch", while "rarely getting the goals his contribution deserved".

== Career ==
=== Early years ===
A forward, Partridge began his career in the youth system at Grimsby Town, before moving to Bradford City and signing his first professional contract in July 1992. He made just five first team substitute appearances for the Bantams, before moving to First Division club Bristol City on a free transfer on 18 February 1994. He made something of a breakthrough at Ashton Gate, making 66 appearances and scoring eight goals over the course of three seasons, but was forced to spend time away on loan during the 1995–96 season. Partridge joined Third Division club Cardiff City for a £50,000 fee in February 1997, but after 13 months in which he was mainly utilised as a winger, he departed Ninian Park in March 1998, having made 41 appearances and scored just two goals.

=== Torquay United ===
On 26 March 1998, Partridge returned to Third Division club Torquay United (with whom he had previously had a loan spell during the 1995–96 season) on a free transfer. Despite failing to score in each of his five appearances at the end of the 1997–98 season, Partridge finally found his goalscoring touch during 1998–99, scoring 14 goals in 35 matches before departing Plainmoor in February 1999.

=== Brentford ===
Partridge joined high-flying Third Division club Brentford for a £100,000 fee on 19 February 1999. Paired with Lloyd Owusu in attack, he showed excellent form in what remained of the 1998–99 season, scoring seven goals in 14 matches to help the Bees to the Third Division title after victory over the eventual runners-up Cambridge United on the final day. Back in the Second Division, Partridge scored four goals in an eight-match spell between late August and early September 1999, but scored just twice more to finish a mid-table season with 47 appearances and six goals.

Partridge began the 2000–01 season on the bench, but regained his starting place under caretaker manager Ray Lewington in December 2000. Paired again with Lloyd Owusu, he scored 9 goals between December and the end of the season, to finish with 47 appearances and 10 goals. The 2000–01 season was memorable for Brentford's run to the final of the Football League Trophy, though despite playing the full 90 minutes at the Millennium Stadium, the Bees were beaten 2–1 by Port Vale. New manager Steve Coppell's signing of forward Ben Burgess on loan in August 2001 heralded the beginning of the end of Partridge's time at Griffin Park and after two early 2001–02 season appearances, he departed the club in September 2001. During 2 1/2 seasons with Brentford, Partridge made 110 appearances and scored 23 goals.

=== Rushden & Diamonds ===
Partridge dropped back down to the Third Division to join newly promoted Rushden & Diamonds on a free transfer on 14 September 2001. Aside from a spell of five goals in 12 matches between late October and late December 2001, Partridge failed to recapture any goalscoring form, but did help the team to the 2002 Third Division play-off final, which was lost 3–1 to Cheltenham Town.

Partridge was utilised almost exclusively as a substitute in the early months of the 2002–03 season, before being transfer-listed in December 2002. On 31 December 2002, Partridge joined Third Division club Exeter City on a one-month loan. He scored in each of his first two matches and made four appearances before his loan expired, despite attempts by manager Neil McNab to persuade him to stay. Partridge departed Rushden & Diamonds on 26 March 2003 and made 52 appearances and scored five goals for the club.

=== Shrewsbury Town ===
On 27 March 2003, Partridge joined Third Division club Shrewsbury Town on a contract running until the end of the 2002–03 season. He made just four appearances before his contract expired.

=== Non-League football ===
Weymouth player-manager Steve Claridge made Partridge his first signing of the 2003–04 season and he signed a three-year contract. He scored 11 goals in 30 appearances before being allowed to join Southern League Premier Division rivals Bath City on a free transfer on 9 January 2004. Partridge went on to have a successful 4 1/2-season spell at Twerton Park, with a pinnacle being the title-winning 2006–07 season, which secured promotion to the Conference South. After recovering from a neck injury, he played on until March 2008, before departing the club to look after his mother. Partridge joined Northern Premier League First Division South club Sheffield in 2008, but moved back up to the Conference South to join Weston-super-Mare on 31 December 2008 and made 9 appearances before retiring at the end of the 2008–09 season.

== Personal life ==
Partridge's father, Malcolm, was also a professional footballer. As of January 2004, he was living in Bristol.

== Career statistics ==
Appearances and goals by club, season and competition
Club	Season	League			FA Cup		League Cup		Other		Total	
Club	Season	Division	Apps	Goals	Apps	Goals	Apps	Goals	Apps	Goals	Apps	Goals
Bradford City	Total		5	0	0	0	2	0	0	0	7	0
Bristol City	1996–97	Second Division	6	0	0	0	1	1	—		7	1
Bristol City	Total		57	7	4	0	5	1	0	0	66	8
Torquay United (loan)	1995–96	Third Division	5	2	—		—		—		5	2
Plymouth Argyle (loan)	1995–96	Third Division	7	2	—		—		—		7	2
Scarborough (loan)	1995–96	Third Division	7	0	—		—		—		7	0
Cardiff City	1996–97	Third Division	14	0	—		—		—		14	0
Cardiff City	1997–98	Third Division	23	2	2	0	2	0	0	0	27	2
Cardiff City	Total		37	2	2	0	2	0	0	0	41	2
Torquay United	1997–98	Third Division	5	0	—		—		—		5	0
Torquay United	1998–99	Third Division	29	12	2	1	2	0	2 (Note: Appearances in Football League Trophy)	1	35	14
Torquay United	Total		39	14	2	1	2	0	2	1	45	16
Brentford	1998–99	Third Division	14	7	—		—		—		14	7
Brentford	1999–00	Second Division	41	6	2	0	2	0	2	0	47	6
Brentford	2000–01	Second Division	37	8	1	0	3	0	6	2	47	10
Brentford	2001–02	Second Division	1	0	0	0	1	0	0	0	2	0
Brentford	Total		93	21	3	0	6	0	8	2	110	23
Rushden & Diamonds	2001–02	Third Division	37	5	2	0	—		4 (Note: 3 appearances in Third Division play-offs, 1 appearance in Conference Shield)	0	43	5
Rushden & Diamonds	2002–03	Third Division	6	0	1	0	2	0	0	0	9	0
Rushden & Diamonds	Total		43	5	3	0	2	0	4	0	52	5
Exeter City (loan)	2002–03	Third Division	4	2	—		—		—		4	2
Shrewsbury Town	2002–03	Third Division	4	0	—		—		—		4	0
Weymouth	2003–04	Southern League Premier Division	14	2	0	0	—		0	0	14	2
Bath City	2003–04	Southern League Premier Division	12	16	—		—		0	0	12	16
Bath City	2004–05	Southern League Premier Division	27	9	0	0	—		0	0	27	9
Bath City	2005–06	Southern League Premier Division	42	20	0	0	—		1 (Note: Appearance in Southern League Premier Division play-offs)	0	43	10
Bath City	2006–07	Southern League Premier Division	30	17	0	0	—		0	0	30	17
Bath City	2007–08	Conference South	27	2	0	0	—		0	0	27	2
Bath City	Total		138	68	0	0	—		0	0	138	68
Weston-super-Mare	2008–09	Conference South	9	0	—		—		—		9	0
Career total			452	123	14	1	19	1	15	3	500	128

== Honours ==
Brentford

- Football League Third Division: 1998–99
- Football League Trophy runner-up: 2000–01

Rushden & Diamonds

- Conference Shield: 2001

Weymouth

- Southern League Premier Division second-place promotion: 2003–04

Bath City

- Southern League Premier Division: 2006–07

Individual

- FA Cup Player of the Round: Third qualifying round, 2004–05
- Team of the FA Cup: 2004–05
