= 2002 Football League play-offs =

Football League play-offs
- Season: 2001–02
- Champions: Birmingham City (First Division); Stoke City (Second Division); Cheltenham Town (Third Division)
- Matches: 15
- Goals: 35 (2.33 per match)
- Biggest home win: Norwich 3–1 Wolves (First Division)
- Biggest away win: Cardiff 0–2 Stoke (Second Division)
- Highest scoring: Norwich 3–1 Wolves; Rushden & Diamonds 2–2 Rochdale; Cheltenham 3–1 Rushden & Diamonds (4 goals)
- Highest attendance: 71,597 – Birmingham v Norwich (First Division final)
- Lowest attendance: 6,015 – Rushden & Diamonds v Rochdale (Third Division semi-final)
- Average attendance: 21,859

The Football League play-offs for the 2001–02 season were held in May 2002, with the finals taking place at Millennium Stadium in Cardiff. The play-off semi-finals will be played over two legs and will be contested by the teams who finish in 3rd, 4th, 5th and 6th place in the Football League First Division and Football League Second Division and the 4th, 5th, 6th and 7th placed teams in the Football League Third Division table. The winners of the semi-finals will go through to the finals, with the winner of the matches gaining promotion for the following season.

== Background ==
The Football League play-offs have been held every year since 1987. They take place for each division following the conclusion of the regular season and are contested by the four clubs finishing below the automatic promotion places.

In the First Division, Wolverhampton Wanderers, who were aiming to return to the top flight after nearly 20 years, finished 3 points behind their Black Country rivals West Bromwich Albion, who finished second and thus gained automatic promotion. Albion ended the season 10 points behind champions Manchester City, who returned to the Premier League after being relegated the previous season. Millwall who were aiming for a place in the top flight for the first time since 1990, finished in fourth place in the table. Birmingham City, who were aiming to return to the top flight for the first time since 1986, finished in fifth place. Norwich City finished 1 point behind Birmingham City and were looking for a place back in the Premiership for the first time since 1995.

== First Division ==
Pos	Team	Pld	W	D	L	GF	GA	GD	Pts
3	Wolverhampton Wanderers	46	25	11	10	76	43	+33	86
4	Millwall	46	22	11	13	69	48	+21	77
5	Birmingham City	46	21	13	12	70	49	+21	76
6	Norwich City	46	22	9	15	60	51	+9	75

=== Semi-finals ===
First leg

28 April 2002
12:00

Birmingham City	1–1	Millwall
Hughes 56'	Report	Dublin 80'

St Andrew's, Birmingham
Attendance: 28,282
Referee: Anthony Bates

28 April 2002
14:30

Norwich City	3–1	Wolverhampton Wanderers
Rivers 56'; McVeigh 73'; Mackay 90'	Report	Sturridge 22'

Carrow Road, Norwich
Attendance: 20,127
Referee: Roger Furnandiz

Second leg

1 May 2002
19:45

Wolverhampton Wanderers	1–0	Norwich City
Cooper 77'	Report

Molineux, Wolverhampton
Attendance: 27,418
Referee: Tony Leake

Norwich City won 3–2 on aggregate.

2 May 2002
19:45

Millwall	0–1	Birmingham City
	Report	John 90'

The New Den, London
Attendance: 16,391
Referee: Graham Laws

Birmingham City won 2–1 on aggregate.

=== Final ===
12 May 2002
15:30

Birmingham City	1–1 (a.e.t.)	Norwich City
Horsfield 102'	Report	Roberts 91'
Penalties
John (penalty scored); Devlin (penalty scored); Lazaridis (penalty scored); Carter (penalty scored)	4–2	(penalty scored) Roberts; (penalty missed) Mulryne; (penalty missed) Sutch; (penalty scored) Easton

Millennium Stadium, Cardiff
Attendance: 71,597
Referee: Graham Barber

== Second Division ==
Pos	Team	Pld	W	D	L	GF	GA	GD	Pts
3	Brentford	46	24	11	11	77	43	+34	83
4	Cardiff City	46	23	14	9	75	50	+25	83
5	Stoke City	46	23	11	12	67	40	+27	80
6	Huddersfield Town	46	21	15	10	65	47	+18	78

=== Semi-finals ===
First leg

28 April 2002
14:00

Stoke City	1–2	Cardiff City
Burton 84'	Report	Earnshaw 12'; Fortune-West 59'

Britannia Stadium, Stoke
Attendance: 21,245
Referee: Tony Leake

28 April 2002
15:00

Huddersfield Town	0–0	Brentford
	Report

Alfred McAlpine Stadium, Huddersfield
Attendance: 16,523
Referee: Graham Laws

Second leg

1 May 2002
19:45

Brentford	2–1	Huddersfield Town
Powell 14'; Owusu 46'	Report	Booth 2'

Griffin Park, Brentford
Attendance: 11,191
Referee: Graham Barber

Brentford won 2–1 on aggregate.

1 May 2002
19:45

Cardiff City	0–2 (a.e.t.)	Stoke City
	Report	O'Connor 90'; Oularé 115'

Ninian Park, Cardiff
Attendance: 19,367
Referee: Mike Dean

Stoke City won 3–2 on aggregate.

=== Final ===
11 May 2002
13:30

Brentford	0–2	Stoke City
	Report	Burton 16'; Burgess 45' (o.g.)

Millennium Stadium, Cardiff
Attendance: 42,523
Referee: Graham Laws

== Third Division ==
Pos	Team	Pld	W	D	L	GF	GA	GD	Pts
4	Cheltenham Town	46	21	15	10	66	49	+17	78
5	Rochdale	46	21	15	10	65	52	+13	78
6	Rushden & Diamonds	46	20	13	13	69	53	+16	73
7	Hartlepool United	46	20	11	15	74	48	+26	71

=== Semi-finals ===
First leg

27 April 2002
15:00

Hartlepool United	1–1	Cheltenham Town
Williams 45'	Report	Grayson 89'

Victoria Park, Hartlepool
Attendance: 7,135
Referee: Mike Dean

27 April 2002
15:00

Rushden & Diamonds	2–2	Rochdale
Wardley 34'; Butterworth 73'	Report	McEvilly 8'; Simpson 57'

Nene Park, Irthlingborough
Attendance: 6,015
Referee: Graham Barber

Second leg

30 April 2002
19:45

Cheltenham Town	1–1 (a.e.t.)	Hartlepool United
Williams 26'	Report	Arnison 17'
Penalties
Grayson (penalty scored); Lee (penalty scored); Yates (penalty scored); Duff (penalty missed); Finnigan (penalty scored); Alsop (penalty scored)	5–4	(penalty scored) Smith; (penalty missed) Stephenson; (penalty scored) Arnison; (penalty scored) Henderson; (penalty scored) Watson; (penalty missed) Humphreys

Whaddon Road, Cheltenham
Attendance: 7,165
Referee: Andy Hall

Cheltenham Town 2–2 Hartlepool United on aggregate. Cheltenham Town won 5–4 on penalties.

30 April 2002
19:45

Rochdale	1–2	Rushden & Diamonds
Peters 65' (o.g.)	Report	Lowe 67'; Hall 76'

Spotland, Rochdale
Attendance: 8,547
Referee: Roger Furnandiz

Rushden & Diamonds won 4–3 on aggregate.

=== Final ===
6 May 2002
15:00

Cheltenham Town	3–1	Rushden & Diamonds
Devaney 27'; Alsop 49'; Finnigan 80'	Report	Hall 28'

Millennium Stadium, Cardiff
Attendance: 24,368
Referee: Tony Leake
