= 2001–02 Football League =

103rd season of the Football League

The Football League
- Season: 2001–02
- Champions: Manchester City
- Promoted: Manchester City; West Bromwich Albion; Birmingham City
- Relegated: Halifax Town
- New team in League: Rushden & Diamonds

The 2001–02 Football League (known as the Nationwide Football League for sponsorship reasons) was the 103rd completed season of The Football League.

== Final league tables and results ==
The tables and results below are reproduced here in the exact form that they can be found at The Rec.Sport.Soccer Statistics Foundation website. Play-off results are from the same website.

== First Division ==
First Division
- Season: 2001–02
- Champions: Manchester City
- Promoted: Manchester City; West Bromwich Albion; Birmingham City
- Relegated: Crewe Alexandra; Barnsley; Stockport County
- Matches: 552
- Goals: 1,485 (2.69 per match)
- Top goalscorer: Shaun Goater (28 goals)

=== Team changes ===
The following teams changed division since the 2000–01 season.

==== From First Division ====
Promoted to FA Premier League

- Fulham
- Blackburn Rovers
- Bolton Wanderers

Relegated to Second Division

- Huddersfield Town
- Queens Park Rangers
- Tranmere Rovers

==== To First Division ====
Promoted from Second Division

- Millwall
- Rotherham United
- Walsall

Relegated from FA Premier League

- Manchester City
- Coventry City
- Bradford City

Pos	Team	Pld	W	D	L	GF	GA	GD	Pts	Qualification or relegation
1	Manchester City (C, P)	46	31	6	9	108	52	+56	99	Promotion to the Premier League
2	West Bromwich Albion (P)	46	27	8	11	61	29	+32	89	Promotion to the Premier League
3	Wolverhampton Wanderers	46	25	11	10	76	43	+33	86	Qualification for the First Division play-offs
4	Millwall	46	22	11	13	69	48	+21	77	Qualification for the First Division play-offs
5	Birmingham City (O, P)	46	21	13	12	70	49	+21	76	Qualification for the First Division play-offs
6	Norwich City	46	22	9	15	60	51	+9	75	Qualification for the First Division play-offs
7	Burnley	46	21	12	13	70	62	+8	75	
8	Preston North End	46	20	12	14	71	59	+12	72	
9	Wimbledon	46	18	13	15	63	57	+6	67	
10	Crystal Palace	46	20	6	20	70	62	+8	66	
11	Coventry City	46	20	6	20	59	53	+6	66	
12	Gillingham	46	18	10	18	64	67	−3	64	
13	Sheffield United	46	15	15	16	53	54	−1	60	
14	Watford	46	16	11	19	62	56	+6	59	
15	Bradford City	46	15	10	21	69	76	−7	55	
16	Nottingham Forest	46	12	18	16	50	51	−1	54	
17	Portsmouth	46	13	14	19	60	72	−12	53	
18	Walsall	46	13	12	21	51	71	−20	51	
19	Grimsby Town	46	12	14	20	50	72	−22	50	
20	Sheffield Wednesday	46	12	14	20	49	71	−22	50	
21	Rotherham United	46	10	19	17	52	66	−14	49	
22	Crewe Alexandra (R)	46	12	13	21	47	76	−29	49	Relegation to the Second Division
23	Barnsley (R)	46	11	15	20	59	86	−27	48	Relegation to the Second Division
24	Stockport County (R)	46	6	8	32	42	102	−60	26	Relegation to the Second Division

Rules for classification: 1) Points; 2) Goal difference; 3) Goals scored
(C) Champions; (O) Play-off winners; (P) Promoted; (R) Relegated

=== Play-offs ===
Semifinals; 1st leg –Apr 28; 2nd leg –May 1/2, 2002
3rd	Wolverhampton Wanderers	1	1	2
6th	Norwich City	3	0	3
4th	Millwall	1	0	1
5th	Birmingham City	1	1	2

Final at Millennium Stadium, Cardiff; May 12, 2002
5th	Birmingham City (pen.)	1 (4)
6th	Norwich City	1 (2)

=== First Division maps ===
Locations of the Football League First Division 2001–2002 teams
Locations of the Football League First Division London teams 2001–2002

== Second Division ==
Football League, Second Division
- Season: 2001–02
- Champions: Brighton & Hove Albion (1st third tier title, and second successive division championship)
- Direct promotion: Brighton & Hove Albion, Reading
- Promoted through play-offs: Stoke City
- Relegated: AFC Bournemouth, Bury, Cambridge United, Wrexham
- Matches: 552
- Goals: 1,472 (2.67 per match)
- Top goalscorer: Bobby Zamora (Brighton & Hove Albion), 28

=== Team changes ===
The following teams changed division since the 2000–01 season.

==== From Second Division ====
Promoted to First Division

- Millwall
- Rotherham United
- Walsall

Relegated to Third Division

- Bristol Rovers
- Luton Town
- Swansea City
- Oxford United

==== To Second Division ====
Promoted from Third Division

- Brighton & Hove Albion
- Cardiff City
- Chesterfield
- Blackpool

Relegated from First Division

- Huddersfield Town
- Queens Park Rangers
- Tranmere Rovers

Pos	Team	Pld	W	D	L	GF	GA	GD	Pts	Promotion or relegation
1	Brighton & Hove Albion (C, P)	46	25	15	6	66	42	+24	90	Promotion to Football League First Division
2	Reading (P)	46	23	15	8	70	43	+27	84	Promotion to Football League First Division
3	Brentford	46	24	11	11	77	43	+34	83	Qualification for the Second Division play-offs
4	Cardiff City	46	23	14	9	75	50	+25	83	Qualification for the Second Division play-offs
5	Stoke City (O, P)	46	23	11	12	67	40	+27	80	Qualification for the Second Division play-offs
6	Huddersfield Town	46	21	15	10	65	47	+18	78	Qualification for the Second Division play-offs
7	Bristol City	46	21	10	15	68	53	+15	73	
8	Queens Park Rangers	46	19	14	13	60	49	+11	71	
9	Oldham Athletic	46	18	16	12	77	65	+12	70	
10	Wigan Athletic	46	16	16	14	66	51	+15	64	
11	Wycombe Wanderers	46	17	13	16	58	64	−6	64	
12	Tranmere Rovers	46	16	15	15	63	60	+3	63	
13	Swindon Town	46	15	14	17	46	56	−10	59	
14	Port Vale	46	16	10	20	51	62	−11	58	
15	Colchester United	46	15	12	19	65	76	−11	57	
16	Blackpool	46	14	14	18	66	69	−3	56	
17	Peterborough United	46	15	10	21	64	59	+5	55	
18	Chesterfield	46	13	13	20	53	65	−12	52	
19	Notts County	46	13	11	22	59	71	−12	50	
20	Northampton Town	46	14	7	25	54	79	−25	49	
21	Bournemouth (R)	46	10	14	22	56	71	−15	44	Relegation to Football League Third Division
22	Bury (R)	46	11	11	24	43	75	−32	44	Relegation to Football League Third Division
23	Wrexham (R)	46	11	10	25	56	89	−33	43	Relegation to Football League Third Division
24	Cambridge United (R)	46	7	13	26	47	93	−46	34	Relegation to Football League Third Division

Rules for classification: In the Football League goals scored (GF) takes precedence over goal difference (GD).
(C) Champions; (O) Play-off winners; (P) Promoted; (R) Relegated

=== Play-offs ===
Semifinals; 1st leg –Apr 28th; 2nd leg –May 1st, 2002
3rd	Brentford	0	2	2
6th	Huddersfield Town	0	1	1
4th	Cardiff City	2	0	2
5th	Stoke City	1	2	3

Final at Millennium Stadium, Cardiff; May 11th, 2002
3rd	Brentford	0
5th	Stoke City	2

=== Second Division maps ===
Locations of the Football League Second Division 2001–2002 teams
Locations of the Football League Second Division London teams 2001–2002

== Third Division ==
Third Division
- Season: 2001–02
- Champions: Plymouth Argyle
- Promoted: Plymouth Argyle; Luton Town; Mansfield Town; Cheltenham Town
- Relegated: Halifax Town
- Matches: 552
- Goals: 1,397 (2.53 per match)
- Top goalscorer: Steve Howard (24 goals)

=== Team changes ===
The following teams changed division since the 2000–01 season.

==== From Third Division ====
Promoted to Second Division

- Brighton & Hove Albion
- Cardiff City
- Chesterfield
- Blackpool

Relegated to Football Conference

- Barnet

==== To Third Division ====
Promoted from Football Conference

- Rushden & Diamonds

Relegated from Second Division

- Bristol Rovers
- Luton Town
- Swansea City
- Oxford United

Pos	Team	Pld	W	D	L	GF	GA	GD	Pts	Qualification or relegation
1	Plymouth Argyle (C, P)	46	31	9	6	71	28	+43	102	Promotion to Football League Second Division
2	Luton Town (P)	46	30	7	9	96	48	+48	97	Promotion to Football League Second Division
3	Mansfield Town (P)	46	24	7	15	72	60	+12	79	Promotion to Football League Second Division
4	Cheltenham Town (O, P)	46	21	15	10	66	49	+17	78	Qualification for the Third Division play-offs
5	Rochdale	46	21	15	10	65	52	+13	78	Qualification for the Third Division play-offs
6	Rushden & Diamonds	46	20	13	13	69	53	+16	73	Qualification for the Third Division play-offs
7	Hartlepool United	46	20	11	15	74	48	+26	71	Qualification for the Third Division play-offs
8	Scunthorpe United	46	19	14	13	74	56	+18	71	
9	Shrewsbury Town	46	20	10	16	64	53	+11	70	
10	Kidderminster Harriers	46	19	9	18	56	47	+9	66	
11	Hull City	46	16	13	17	57	51	+6	61	
12	Southend United	46	15	13	18	51	54	−3	58	
13	Macclesfield Town	46	15	13	18	41	52	−11	58	
14	York City	46	16	9	21	54	67	−13	57	
15	Darlington	46	15	11	20	60	71	−11	56	
16	Exeter City	46	14	13	19	48	73	−25	55	
17	Carlisle United	46	12	16	18	49	56	−7	52	
18	Leyton Orient	46	13	13	20	55	71	−16	52	
19	Torquay United	46	12	15	19	46	63	−17	51	
20	Swansea City	46	13	12	21	53	77	−24	51	
21	Oxford United	46	11	14	21	53	62	−9	47	
22	Lincoln City	46	10	16	20	44	62	−18	46	
23	Bristol Rovers	46	11	12	23	40	60	−20	45	
24	Halifax Town (R)	46	8	12	26	39	84	−45	36	Relegation to Football Conference

Rules for classification: 1) Points; 2) Goal difference; 3) Goals scored
(C) Champions; (O) Play-off winners; (P) Promoted; (R) Relegated

=== Play-offs ===
Semifinals; 1st leg –Apr 27th; 2nd leg –Apr 30th, 2002
4th	Cheltenham Town (pens.)	1	1	2 (5)
7th	Hartlepool United	1	1	2 (4)
5th	Rochdale	2	1	3
6th	Rushden & Diamonds	2	2	4

Final at Millennium Stadium, Cardiff; May 6th, 2002
4th	Cheltenham Town	3
6th	Rushden & Diamonds	1

=== Third Division maps ===
Locations of the Football League Third Division teams 2001–2002

== Attendances ==
No.	Club	Average	Change	Highest	Lowest
1	Manchester City	33,059	-2.9%	34,657	30,238
2	Wolverhampton Wanderers	23,796	23.6%	28,015	19,231
3	Birmingham City	21,978	3.3%	29,178	17,310
4	Nottingham Forest	21,700	5.3%	28,546	15,632
5	West Bromwich Albion	20,910	18.4%	26,712	17,335
6	Sheffield Wednesday	20,870	8.3%	29,772	15,592
7	Norwich City	18,629	12.7%	21,251	15,710
8	Crystal Palace	18,121	6.2%	22,080	13,970
9	Sheffield United	18,020	4.7%	29,364	14,180
10	Coventry City	16,150	-21.5%	22,902	12,448
11	Burnley	15,948	-1.8%	21,823	13,162
12	Bradford City	15,489	-16.3%	20,209	12,846
13	Portsmouth	15,122	11.7%	19,103	12,336
14	Preston North End	14,887	1.9%	21,014	11,371
15	Watford	14,868	6.6%	18,911	12,160
16	Barnsley	13,323	-7.9%	18,803	10,976
17	Millwall	13,253	15.8%	17,058	10,021
18	Gillingham	8,602	-7.4%	10,477	7,025
19	Rotherham United	7,455	31.9%	11,426	5,586
20	Crewe Alexandra	7,129	6.4%	10,092	5,419
21	Wimbledon	6,961	-11.9%	13,564	4,249
22	Walsall	6,832	21.3%	9,181	5,080
23	Grimsby Town	6,431	13.9%	9,275	4,859
24	Stockport County	6,245	-11.2%	9,537	4,086

== See also ==
- 2001–02 in English football
- 2001 in association football
- 2002 in association football
