= Daniel Talbot (footballer) =

English footballer

Personal information
- Date of birth: 30 January 1984 (age 42)
- Place of birth: Enfield, England
- Position: Left winger

Team information
- Current team: Dunstable Town

Senior career*
Years	Team	Apps	(Gls)
2001–2004	Rushden & Diamonds	23	(1)
2005	Cambridge City		
2006	Potters Bar Town		
2007–2012	Chesham United	161	(23)
2012–2015	Hemel Hempstead Town	82	(7)
2015–2018	Chesham United		
2018–	Hitchin Town		
- * Club domestic league appearances and goals as of 13:12, 1 June 2019 (UTC)

Daniel Talbot (born 30 January 1984) is an English footballer who plays for Southern League Premier Division side Dunstable Town, where he plays as a midfielder.

He played in the Football League for Rushden & Diamonds before dropping into non-league football. His father is Brian Talbot.

== Honours ==
Rushden & Diamonds

- Football League Third Division: 2002–03
