= Neil Howarth =

English footballer (born 1971)

Personal information
- Date of birth: 15 November 1971 (age 54)
- Place of birth: Bolton, England
- Position: Defender

Youth career
- Burnley

Senior career*
| Years | Team | Apps | (Gls) |
| 1987–1994 | Burnley | 1 | (0) |
| 1993–1994 | → Macclesfield Town (Loan) | 23 | (3) |
| 1994–1999 | Macclesfield Town | 176 | (19) |
| 1999–2003 | Cheltenham Town | 120 | (7) |
| 2003–2006 | Telford United | 68 | (4) |
| 2006 | Kidderminster Harriers | 1 | (0) |
| Total | | 389 | (33) |

International career
| 1995–1997 | England C | 2 | (0) |

Managerial career
- 2008–2009: Kidderminster Harriers (assistant manager)
- 2009–2014: Cheltenham Town (assistant manager)
- 2018: Macclesfield Town (assistant manager)
- 2018: Macclesfield Town (caretaker)
- 2020–: Stourbridge (assistant manager)
- 2021–: Solihull Moors (assistant manager)
- * Club domestic league appearances and goals

Neil Howarth (born 15 November 1971) is an English football coach and former player. As a player, he played as a defender in the Football League with Macclesfield Town and Cheltenham Town.

== Career ==
Howarth is a former Burnley, Macclesfield Town and Cheltenham Town player, who as captain led Macclesfield Town to two Conference National titles, in 1995 and 1997, to FA Trophy winners in 1996, and to the runner-up spot in Division Three in 1998. He joined Cheltenham Town in February 1999 for a fee of £10,000 and made over 140 appearances for the club in four and a half seasons. helping them to the National Conference title in 1998–99. He left Cheltenham in 2003 when his contract was not renewed and joined Conference side Telford United where he spent two and a half seasons.

In January 2006, he joined Kidderminster Harriers as assistant manager to Mark Yates and helped revive the club after relegation from the Football League in 2005. He signed a new two-year contract in June 2007, and a further one-year contract in May 2009. He left Kidderminster Harriers the same day as boss Mark Yates and joined Cheltenham Town firstly as first team coach before becoming Assistant Manager. He left the club in 2014.

== Honours ==
Cheltenham Town

- Football League Third Division play-offs: 2002
