= Anthony Griffin (footballer) =

English footballer

Personal information
- Date of birth: 22 March 1979 (age 47)
- Place of birth: Bournemouth, England
- Height: 5 ft 11 in (1.80 m)
- Position: Right back

Senior career*
Years	Team	Apps	(Gls)
1996–1999	Bournemouth	5	(0)
1999–2004	Cheltenham Town	95	(1)
2004–2006	Dorchester Town	36	(0)
2005	→ Lymington & New Milton (loan)	6	(2)
Total		142	(3)
- * Club domestic league appearances and goals

Anthony Griffin (born 22 March 1979) in Bournemouth, England, is an English retired professional footballer who played as a defender for Bournemouth and Cheltenham Town in the Football League.

== Honours ==
Cheltenham Town

- Football League Third Division play-offs: 2002
