= Dale Roberts (footballer, born 1986) =

English footballer (1986-2010)

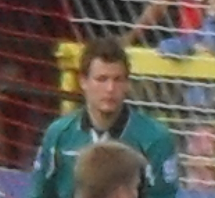
- Roberts playing for Rushden & Diamonds in 2010

Personal information
- Date of birth: 22 October 1986
- Place of birth: Horden, England
- Date of death: 14 December 2010 (aged 24)
- Place of death: Higham Ferrers, England
- Position: Goalkeeper

Youth career
- Sunderland
- 2003–2005: Middlesbrough

Senior career*
Years	Team	Apps	(Gls)
2005–2009	Nottingham Forest	0	(0)
2006	→ Eastwood Town (loan)	10	(0)
2006–2007	→ Alfreton Town (loan)	42	(0)
2008	→ Rushden & Diamonds (loan)	13	(0)
2008–2009	→ Rushden & Diamonds (loan)	14	(0)
2009–2010	Rushden & Diamonds	61	(0)
Total		140	(0)

International career
2009–2010	England C	6	(0)
- * Club domestic league appearances and goals

Dale Roberts (22 October 1986 – 14 December 2010) was an English footballer who played as a goalkeeper.

Roberts started his career in his native North-East with the academy sides at Sunderland and Middlesbrough before he moved to Nottingham Forest. He failed to make Forest's first team and had loans spells with Eastwood Town and Alfreton Town. He had two more loan spells both with Rushden & Diamonds before joining the Conference National side on a permanent deal in 2009. He won the club's player of the season in 2008–09. He also won six caps for the England C team, winning the 2009–10 player of the year, before his death by suicide at the age of 24.

== Club career ==
Roberts was born in Horden, County Durham. His mother was Isabella. He played for Cleveland Juniors Football Club and attended Easington Comprehensive School with fellow academy footballer Adam Johnson. He was with the Sunderland and Middlesbrough football academies, joining the latter in 2003 as a scholar and was part of Boro's FA Youth Cup winning squad in 2004 as back-up to David Knight.

Roberts began his senior career with Nottingham Forest after signing as a professional in 2005. He joined local Northern Premier League First Division side Eastwood Town on loan in March 2006, where he made 10 appearances. He joined Conference North club Alfreton Town on a season-long loan for the 2006–07 season in July, which he finished with 42 appearances.

He joined Conference National team Rushden & Diamonds on a one-month loan on 24 January 2008, which was extended for a second month in February. He made 19 first team appearances for the club, including the Conference League Cup Final. Roberts rejoined Rushden for a second loan spell in October 2008 as cover for Alan Marriott who was out with a stomach injury that needed surgery. The loan was extended until January 2009 and he finished the spell with 18 appearances, keeping five clean sheets, and subsequently signed permanently at Nene Park on 2 January 2009. He was named Rushden's player of the season in 2008–09.

== International career ==
Roberts' performances for Rushden & Diamonds during the 2008–09 season earned him international recognition. He made his debut for the England C team against Malta.

During the 2009–10 season, Roberts played in all four England C games, and was voted the England C player of the season. His last appearance for England C, and in fact in all senior football, came against Wales on 14 September 2010.

== Personal life ==
Roberts was engaged to Lindsey Cowan, but the pair split in May 2010 after revelations she had been having an affair with Roberts' teammate Paul Terry. Later in the year, Roberts and Cowan resumed their relationship and were still engaged to be married at the time of Roberts' death.

== Death ==
On 14 December 2010, just hours before he was due to play in an FA Trophy match against his former club Eastwood Town, it was announced that Roberts had died. The match was subsequently postponed. Roberts was found by Northamptonshire Police at his home in Higham Ferrers, Northamptonshire; they said that they were not treating the circumstances as suspicious. The club's FA Youth Cup tie the following day was postponed as was the following first team game against Eastbourne Borough. The cause of death was reported to be suicide by hanging. At an inquest opened at the end of the week, deputy coroner Rodney Haig gave cause of death as asphyxia. Following Roberts' death, Rushden retired their number one shirt. Coroner Anne Pember recorded a suicide verdict at the closing of Roberts' inquest, which heard the goalkeeper had killed himself after struggling to come to terms with an injury and national media speculation about his fiancée's affair with Paul Terry.

Roberts' number one jersey was also retired by phoenix club AFC Rushden & Diamonds. However, in 2015, Southern Football League rules meant that they had to register the number to a player, despite an appeal to The FA. AFC Rushden's appeal was later successful.

== Career statistics ==
Appearances and goals by club, season and competition
Club	Season	League^{[A]}		FA Cup		League Cup		Other^{[B]}		Total	
Club	Season	Apps	Goals	Apps	Goals	Apps	Goals	Apps	Goals	Apps	Goals
Nottingham Forest	2005–06	0	0	0	0	0	0	0	0	0	0
Nottingham Forest	2006–07	0	0	0	0	0	0	0	0	0	0
Nottingham Forest	2007–08	0	0	0	0	0	0	0	0	0	0
Nottingham Forest	2008–09	0	0	0	0	0	0	0	0	0	0
Nottingham Forest	Total	0	0	0	0	0	0	0	0	0	0
Eastwood Town (loan)	2005–06	10	0	0	0	0	0	0	0	10	0
Alfreton Town (loan)	2006–07	42	0	0	0	0	0	0	0	42	0
Rushden & Diamonds (loan)	2007–08	13	0	0	0	0	0	6	0	19	0
Rushden & Diamonds (loan)	2008–09	14	0	1	0	0	0	3	0	18	0
Rushden & Diamonds	2008–09	20	0	0	0	0	0	1	0	21	0
Rushden & Diamonds	2009–10	33	0	0	0	0	0	4	0	37	0
Rushden & Diamonds	2010–11	8	0	0	0	0	0	0	0	8	0
Rushden & Diamonds	Total	88	0	1	0	0	0	14	0	103	0
Career total		140	0	1	0	0	0	14	0	155	0

== Footnotes ==
A. The "League" column constitutes appearances and goals (including those as a substitute) in the Football Conference and Northern Premier League.
B. The "Other" column constitutes appearances and goals (including those as a substitute) in the Conference League Cup, FA Trophy and play-offs.
