= John Finnigan =

English footballer (born 1976)

Personal information
- Full name: John Francis Finnigan
- Date of birth: 29 March 1976 (age 50)
- Place of birth: Wakefield, England
- Position: Midfielder

Youth career
- Nottingham Forest

Senior career*
Years	Team	Apps	(Gls)
1994-1998	Nottingham Forest	0	(0)
1998	→ Lincoln City (loan)	6	(0)
1998–2002	Lincoln City	137	(3)
2002–2009	Cheltenham Town	220	(20)
2009–2010	Kidderminster Harriers	16	(3)
2010–2011	Bishop's Cleeve	12	(0)
2011–2012	Shortwood United		

Managerial career
- 2009–2010: Kidderminster Harriers (caretaker)
- * Club domestic league appearances and goals

John Francis Finnigan (born 29 March 1976) is an English football coach and former professional footballer.

He played as a midfielder in the Football League for Lincoln City and Cheltenham Town after starting his career with Nottingham Forest. He later had spells in Non-League for Kidderminster Harriers, Bishop's Cleeve and Shortwood United. He had a brief spell in charge of Kidderminster in 2009.

== Playing career ==
Born in Wakefield, Finnigan began his career with Nottingham Forest however failed to make an appearance at the City Ground and was loaned out to Lincoln City for his first spell with the club in 1998. He made his first league appearance for Lincoln in April 1998 against Macclesfield Town and featured in the Imps promotion to Division Two.

Finnigan signed permanently for Lincoln City for an undisclosed fee, later revealed as £50,000.00 and for the 2000–01 season he was made team captain. Finnigan missed a large chunk of the 2001–02 season with a neck injury and after four years at Sincil Bank he left the club in March 2002 to join Cheltenham Town.

In his first season with Cheltenham Town, Finnigan helped Cheltenham to promotion via the play-offs, scoring in the play-off final against Rushden & Diamonds at the Millennium Stadium, he received the 'players Player of the Season' award at Whaddon Road in his first full season.

He was made captain at the club and in 2006 he signed a new two-year contract under manager John Ward to keep him at Cheltenham until the summer of 2008. Finnigan then signed a contract extension to keep him at Cheltenham until 2010 alongside striker Steven Gillespie in August 2007. Finnigan suffered an injury which kept him out of action for a year in 2007.

In the close season of 2009, Finnigan was released by Cheltenham, with the remaining one year on his contract cancelled by mutual consent, quoting 'it was time to move on'. He signed for Conference National side Kidderminster Harriers on a two-year contract.

In October 2010, he parted company with Kidderminster Harriers.

== Coaching career ==
Finnigan was appointed as temporary manager of Kidderminster Harriers on 23 December 2009 following the departure of Mark Yates to Cheltenham Town.

== Personal life ==
Finnigan is married and has 2 sons. He owns a property maintenance business based in the Cotswolds.

== Honours ==
Lincoln city

• Promoted to division 2 1998

Cheltenham Town

- Football League Third Division play-offs: 2002
- Football League Two play-offs: 2006
