= Jim Rodwell =

English footballer and administrator

Personal information
- Date of birth: 20 November 1970 (age 55)
- Place of birth: Lincoln, England
- Position: Defender

Youth career
- 1987–1989: Darlington

Senior career*
Years	Team	Apps	(Gls)
1987–1989	Darlington	1	(0)
1989–1990	Sabah FA	22	(56)
1990	Hednesford Town	12	(39)
1991	Bedworth United	54	(4)
1991–1992	Nuneaton Borough	12	(8)
1992–1996	Halesowen Town	47	(2)
1996–2002	Rushden & Diamonds	150	(3)
2002	→Dagenham & Redbridge (loan)	1	(0)
2002	Boston United	19	(2)
2002–2003	Farnborough Town	19	(1)
2003	Aldershot Town	13	(0)
2003–2004	Tamworth	6	(0)
2004	Havant & Waterlooville		
2004	Boston United		
- * Club domestic league appearances and goals

Jim Rodwell (born 20 November 1970) is the Managing Director of Charlton Athletic Football Club and also a former footballer player.

== Career ==
Rodwell began his career playing junior football for Lincoln City and was offered apprentice forms prior to Lincoln being the first team relegated from the football league into the conference in 1987. With uncertainty surrounding the status of Lincoln's players, Rodwell instead undertook his apprenticeship with Darlington. From Darlington, Rodwell went to play football in Malaysia for the Sabah State team. After spells at Leeds United and Sheffield United, he moved to the non-league pyramid, joining the likes of Hednesford Town, Bedworth United, Nuneaton Borough and Halesowen Town. In 1995, Rodwell captained the Great Britain University side at the World Student Games in Fukuoka, Japan. In August 1996, he became Halesowen's record sale when Rushden & Diamonds paid £40,000 for his services. An integral part of Rushden's rise up the pyramid into the football league, he was named as the club's player of the year on two occasions.

In 2002, Rodwell also came third on ITV's Britain's Brainiest Footballer quiz.

Rodwell moved to Boston United in February 2002, helping the Pilgrims into the football league. From Boston, Jim played for Farnborough Town then Aldershot Town and finally Tamworth. In January 2004, he returned to Boston United, initially as Caretaker manager, before taking up a role as Director of football and eventually becoming Chairman in June 2006. In July 2007, after a turbulent time Rodwell resigned as chairman in the wake of the club being sold to Chestnut Homes.

On 11 February 2010 Rodwell became chief executive of Notts County after a buyout of County by Ray Trew. Rodwell left Notts County in March 2015 to take up the position of Chief Executive Officer at Scunthorpe United Football Club, and then on 22 April 2020 he was announced as chief executive of Sunderland. He left that post on 19 February 2021, after Sunderland was taken over by Kyril Louis-Dreyfus. Rodwell took the job as Interim CEO at Peterborough United whilst they searched for a permanent CEO after Bob Symns retirement.

From February 2022 until July 2022, Rodwell served as the interim CEO for Hull City.

Rodwell has sat on the board of both the English Football League and the Football Association Council.

On 20 December 2022, Rodwell was named chief operating officer of Charlton Athletic. The failure of a proposed takeover of the club led to Rodwell's departure on 10 February 2023. In July 2023 he was appointed Managing Director of Charlton after it was taken over by Global Football Partners.
