= Paul Hall (footballer) =

English-born Jamaican footballer (born 1972)

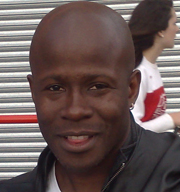
- Paul Hall, 2007

Personal information
- Full name: Paul Anthony Hall
- Date of birth: 3 July 1972 (age 54)
- Place of birth: Manchester, England
- Height: 5 ft 8 in (1.73 m)
- Position: Striker

Team information
- Current team: Queens Park Rangers (B Team Head Coach)

Senior career*
Years	Team	Apps	(Gls)
1990–1993	Torquay United	93	(3)
1993–1998	Portsmouth	188	(37)
1998–2000	Coventry City	10	(0)
1999	→ Bury (loan)	7	(0)
1999–2000	→ Sheffield United (loan)	4	(1)
2000	→ West Bromwich Albion (loan)	4	(0)
2000	→ Walsall (loan)	2	(1)
2000–2001	Walsall	49	(9)
2001–2004	Rushden & Diamonds	112	(26)
2004–2005	Tranmere Rovers	55	(13)
2005–2007	Chesterfield	91	(20)
2007–2008	Walsall	19	(1)
2008	→ Wrexham (loan)	11	(1)
2008	Newport County	13	(0)
2008–2010	Stratford Town	9	(1)
2010	Spalding United	15	(10)
2011	Mansfield Town	3	(0)
Total		685	(138)

International career
1997–2003	Jamaica	48	(14)

Managerial career
- 2021–2022: Jamaica (interim)
- 2022: Queens Park Rangers (caretaker)
- * Club domestic league appearances and goals

Paul Anthony Hall (born 3 July 1972) is a football coach and former professional footballer who is the head coach of EFL Championship club Queens Park Rangers B team.

As a player he was a striker he notably played in the Premier League for Coventry City, as well as in the Football League for Torquay United, Portsmouth, Bury, Sheffield United, West Bromwich Albion, Walsall, Rushden & Diamonds, Tranmere Rovers, Chesterfield and Wrexham. He saw out the final years of his career in non-league football with Newport County, Stratford Town, Spalding United and Mansfield Town. Born in Manchester, England, he represented Jamaica internationally, earning 48 caps and scoring 14 goals. He was part of their squad for FIFA World Cup 1998.

Since retiring he spent a spell coaching with Tamworth, before later moving to Queens Park Rangers as an under-23s coach. He later became assistant head coach of Jamaica and in 2021 became interim head coach. Following the departure of Michael Beale he was named interim manager back at QPR. During his playing career, Hall was a striker who could also play on the right wing.

== Playing career ==
Hall began his career as an apprentice at Torquay United, turning professional on 9 July 1990, although he had already made his league debut the previous season. He helped the Gulls to promotion via the play-offs, primarily playing as a winger, and made a total of 93 league appearances, before a £70,000 transfer to Portsmouth on 25 March 1993.

Hall was to spend five seasons with the Fratton Park outfit, and after some impressive displays he gained a call up to the Jamaica national football team to participate at the 1998 FIFA World Cup.

After some impressive performances at the World Cup, Hall moved to Coventry City for a fee of £300,000. Within four months at Coventry he had been told by manager Gordon Strachan that he did not fit into his plans, but Hall chose to stay and fight for a place, turning down a move to Port Vale in late November 1998. On 18 February 1999, he joined Bury on loan, but again returned to Highfield Road to fight for a first team place. The following season chances were even sparser, with loan moves to Sheffield United on 17 December 1999 (scoring once against Grimsby Town), and to West Bromwich Albion on 10 February 2000, neither of which resulted in permanent deals. He scored once during his spell at Coventry against Southend United in the League Cup.

On 17 March 2000, Hall left Highfield Road, joining Walsall on loan until the end of the season, and in the summer joined the Saddlers permanently on a free transfer. He helped the club to gain promotion to the Football League First Division via the play-offs, but found himself out of manager Ray Graydon's plans for the 2001–02 campaign. Port Vale attempted to take him loan on 20 September, but were told by Walsall that only a permanent deal would suffice. The following week, he was offered a trial at Queens Park Rangers, but again returned to Walsall. On 10 October 2001, he finally left the Bescot Stadium, joining league newcomers Rushden & Diamonds on a free transfer, playing alongside fellow former Torquay forwards Scott Partridge and Duane Darby. Hall spent three seasons with Rushden & Diamonds, making 112 appearances and scoring 26 goals. In the Third Division play-off final, Hall scored a superb solo goal straight from kickoff after Cheltenham scored. When financial problems forced Rushden to offload several players, he signed for Tranmere Rovers where he played 55 times and scored 13 goals.

For the 2005–06 season Hall signed on a free for Chesterfield, for whom he was the top scorer with 15 goals in 47 league and cup starts. On 4 June 2007, Hall returned to his former club Walsall. He scored once in his second spell at the club; a last minute winner against Hartlepool United.

On 11 January 2008, Hall and fellow Saddlers teammate, Danny Sonner both joined League Two strugglers Wrexham, however Hall's deal was only a loan deal. Hall scored his first goal for Wrexham on 9 March which was the opening goal in a 2–0 win at local rivals Chester City. Unfortunately for Hall he suffered an injury, and returned to Walsall. In July 2008, Hall signed for Conference South club Newport County under manager Dean Holdsworth. Hall's contract with Newport was cancelled in October 2008 by mutual consent. He joined Stratford Town of the Midland Football Alliance in November 2008.

In July 2010, Hall was named youth team coach at Mansfield Town, but left the club just two months later when financial trouble forced the club to shut down their youth team. He subsequently joined Spalding United as a player, and made his debut for the Tulips on 2 October 2010 in a 3–0 defeat. Hall returned to Mansfield on 19 November 2010 when he was hired as Duncan Russell's assistant manager. On 30 March 2011, Hall was registered as a player to help ease the injury crisis at Mansfield Town, after the club could only name three healthy substitutes in the match against Crawley Town the day before. He made three appearances before the end of the season. Hall left his assistant manager role on 7 June 2011.

== International career ==
Although born and raised in England, Hall was eligible to play for Jamaica because of family connections. He made his international debut for the "Reggae Boyz" in 1997, and helped Jamaica qualify for the 1998 World Cup. He subsequently started all three games in the World Cup. In total, he played 41 games and scored 14 goals for Jamaica.

== Coaching career ==
Hall currently holds a UEFA 'PRO' coaching licence. In 2009 Hall coached at Solihull College. In November 2010, he was named assistant manager at English Conference side Mansfield Town.

Hall joined up with Marcus Law at Conference National side Tamworth, and helped with coaching the team. Hall lives local to the Tamworth area, and passed on his experience to a young squad.

He has been the Senior Professional Development Coach at Queens Park Rangers since 2015.

In December 2021, Hall was named interim head coach of the Jamaica senior national team.

In November 2022 he was appointed QPR interim manager, taking charge of the 3–0 loss to Burnley. He was succeeded by former Blackpool manager Neil Critchley.

== Personal life ==
Hall studied at Staffordshire University for a degree in Sports Journalism, graduating in 2015. He has 2 sons, named Paul Junior born in 2000, and Corey, born in 2002.

== Honours ==
Torquay United

- Football League Fourth Division play-offs: 1991

Walsall

- Football League Second Division play-offs: 2001

Rushden & Diamonds

- Football League Third Division: 2002–03

Individual

- CONCACAF Gold Cup Best XI: 1998
- PFA Team of the Year: 2002–03 Third Division
