= Martyn Lee (footballer) =

English footballer

Personal information
- Date of birth: 10 September 1980 (age 46)
- Place of birth: Guildford, England
- Position: Midfielder

Senior career*
Years	Team	Apps	(Gls)
1998–2003	Wycombe Wanderers	41	(3)
2001–2002	→ Cheltenham Town (loan)	5	(0)
2003-2004	Maidenhead United		
2004-2006	Kingstonian FC		
- * Club domestic league appearances and goals

Martyn Lee (born 10 September 1980) is an English former professional footballer who played in the Football League for Wycombe Wanderers and Cheltenham Town.

== Honours ==
Cheltenham Town

- Football League Third Division play-offs: 2002
