= 1995–96 Torquay United F.C. season =

Torquay United
1995–96 season
- Chairman: Mike Bateson
- Manager: Don O'Riordan (until 29 October); Mick Buxton (caretaker) (until 16 November); Eddie May (from 17 November)
- Division Three: 24th
- FA Cup: Second round
- League Cup: Second round
- League Trophy: First round
- Top goalscorer: League: Paul Baker & Paul Buckle (4); All: Paul Baker, Paul Buckle & Ian Hathaway (4)
- Highest home attendance: 4,269 vs. Plymouth Argyle, 8 April 1996 (Division Three)
- Lowest home attendance: 1,135 vs. Swindon Town, 17 October 1995 (League Trophy)
- Average home league attendance: 2,454
Home colours

The 1995–96 Torquay United F.C. season was Torquay United's 62nd season in the Football League and their fourth consecutive season in Division Three. The season runs from 1 July 1995 to 30 June 1996.
