= Mark Peters (footballer, born 1972) =

Welsh footballer

Personal information
- Date of birth: 6 July 1972 (age 54)
- Place of birth: St Asaph, Wales
- Height: 6 ft 2 in (1.88 m)
- Position: Defender

Senior career*
Years	Team	Apps	(Gls)
1990–1992	Manchester City	0	(0)
1992–1993	Norwich City	0	(0)
1993–1994	Peterborough United	19	(0)
1994–1999	Mansfield Town	109	(9)
1999–2003	Rushden & Diamonds	119	(9)
2003–2005	Leyton Orient	41	(2)
2005–2008	Cambridge United	90	(5)
2008–2009	King's Lynn	29	(1)
2009–2011	St Albans City	52	(5)
2011	Weymouth	1	(0)

International career
	Wales U18	1	(0)
	Wales U21	3	(0)

Managerial career
- 2013: Corby Town (interim)
- 2020: Corby Town
- * Club domestic league appearances and goals

Mark Peters (born 6 July 1972) is a Welsh former professional footballer who played as a defender. He made over 230 appearances in the Football League.

== Career ==
=== Playing career ===
Peters began his career as a trainee at Manchester City in 1990 before spending the 1992–93 season at Norwich City. He moved to Peterborough United in August 1993, where he made his first team debut in 1993. Spells at Mansfield Town and Rushden & Diamonds between 1994 and 2003 yielded over 200 appearances with 18 goals. He joined Rushden in May 1999 and helped them win the Conference National title in 2001 and to promotion to Division Two (now League One) in 2003. He was released by Rushden in September 2003 when his contract was cancelled by mutual consent, and joined Leyton Orient.

Peters spent two seasons with Leyton Orient, where after being a regular in his first season, he only made one start in the 2004–05 season before joining Aldershot Town on a one-month loan in November 2004. A foot injury then interrupted his season and he did not play again until April 2005. He left Orient at the end of the season and joined Cambridge United in August 2005, where he combined playing coaching. He joined King's Lynn on a one-year contract in July 2008.

=== Coaching career ===
In 2009 Peters joined St Albans City as player/assistant manager and youth team coach. He later joined Corby Town, initially as youth manager, becoming assistant manager. Following the resignation of manager Chris Plummer in August 2013, he was made interim manager until Tommy Wright and Andrew Wilson were appointed in September, after which he returned to the post of youth coach. He subsequently worked at the FootballCV Academy, before becoming Head of Academy Coaching at Mansfield Town in June 2015. He returned to Corby Town as manager in February 2020, He left at the end of 2019–20 season.

== Honours ==
Rushden & Diamonds

- Football League Third Division: 2002–03
