= Garry Butterworth =

English footballer

Personal information
- Full name: Garry Jeffrey Butterworth
- Date of birth: 8 September 1969 (age 57)
- Place of birth: Whittlesey, England
- Position: Midfielder

Youth career
- ?–1986: Peterborough United

Senior career*
Years	Team	Apps	(Gls)
1986–1992	Peterborough United	124	(4)
1992	Kettering Town	8	(1)
1992–1994	Dagenham & Redbridge	83	(8)
1994–2002	Rushden & Diamonds	286	(9)
2002–2003	Farnborough Town	27	(1)
2003–2004	Kettering Town	31	(3)
2004	King's Lynn	4	(0)
2004–2005	Stamford	36	(2)
2005–2006	Wisbech Town	?	(?)
- * Club domestic league appearances and goals

Garry Butterworth (born 8 September 1969) is a professional footballer, having previously played for Dagenham & Redbridge, Rushden & Diamonds, Farnborough Town, and Kettering Town. He was a midfielder.

== Career ==
=== Rushden & Diamonds ===
Butterwoth moved to Rushden & Diamonds in 1994 for £22,000, going on to play 368 times for the club, a club record. He also set a club record by playing in over 100 consecutive games. During his time at the club, Rushden progressed from the Southern Football League Premier Division to the Football League. His final game for the club was at Millennium Stadium in the Division Three play-offs.

His testimonial in 2001 was attended by over 4,000 fans.

=== Farnborough Town ===
Following his departure from Nene Park Butterworth joined Farnborough Town, who had just gained promotion to the Football Conference. He spent just a season there, playing 26 times, and scoring two goals. During his season at the club Farnborough enjoyed their best ever spells in the FA Cup (reaching the 4th round), and the quarter-finals of the FA Trophy.

=== Kettering Town ===
After leaving Farnborough, Butterworth joined Kettering Town.

=== Coates Athletic ===
Butterworth has since returned to the football field in his local town Whittlesey, playing regularly for Peterborough District Football League side, Coates Athletic during the seasons 2010/2011, 2011/2012 and 2012/2013.

== Honours ==
Team Achievements

- Southern League Midland Division Champions
- Southern League Premier Division Champions
- Football Conference Champions
- Division Three Play-Off Finalists

Individual Honours Rushden & Diamonds

- Supporters' Player of the Year: 1995
- Supporters' Player of the Year: 1997
- Players' Player of the Year: 1997
