= Max Griggs =

British businessman (1938–2021)

William Maximillian Griggs (September 1938 – 8 July 2021) was the president of the R Griggs Group, owner of the Dr. Martens company, and one of the largest shoe manufacturers in the United Kingdom.

According to the 2019 Sunday Times Rich List Griggs and his son Stephen were worth £264 million.

In 1992 Max Griggs bought Rushden Town and Irthlingborough Diamonds football clubs. He merged them into one as Rushden & Diamonds F.C.

He died on 8 July 2021 aged 82.
