= Barry Hunter (footballer) =

Northern Irish footballer (born 1968)

Personal information
- Full name: Barry Victor Hunter
- Date of birth: 18 November 1968 (age 57)
- Place of birth: Coleraine, Northern Ireland
- Height: 6 ft 3 in (1.91 m)
- Position: Defender

Senior career*
Years	Team	Apps	(Gls)
1988–1993	Crusaders	74	(3)
1993–1996	Wrexham	91	(4)
1996–2001	Reading	84	(4)
1999	→ Southend United (loan)	5	(2)
2001–2006	Rushden & Diamonds	112	(6)
2006	Portadown	5	(0)
2014	116 Exiles	4	(12)
Total		371	(19)

International career
1995–1999	Northern Ireland	14	(1)

Managerial career
- 2004: Rushden & Diamonds
- 2005–2006: Rushden & Diamonds
- * Club domestic league appearances and goals

Barry Hunter (born 18 November 1968) is a former Northern Ireland international footballer, working as chief scout for Premier League club Liverpool.

Hunter was born in Coleraine, and made his name with Wrexham before transferring to Reading for £400,000. On ending his playing career at Portadown, he had a short spell as the caretaker-assistant manager at Swindon Town under Ady Williams. Williams and Hunter were replaced by Paul Sturrock and Kevin Summerfield.

He joined Premier League Blackburn Rovers as a senior scout in 2006, responsible for team assessments and player recruitment. He was recruited by Norwich City manager Glenn Roeder as the clubs chief scout in June 2008. In December 2008, Hunter moved to Manchester City as a senior scout/regional scouting manager.

In September 2012, Hunter moved to Liverpool as the club's chief scout.

== Honours ==
Rushden & Diamonds

- Football League Third Division: 2002–03
