= Billy Turley =

English footballer

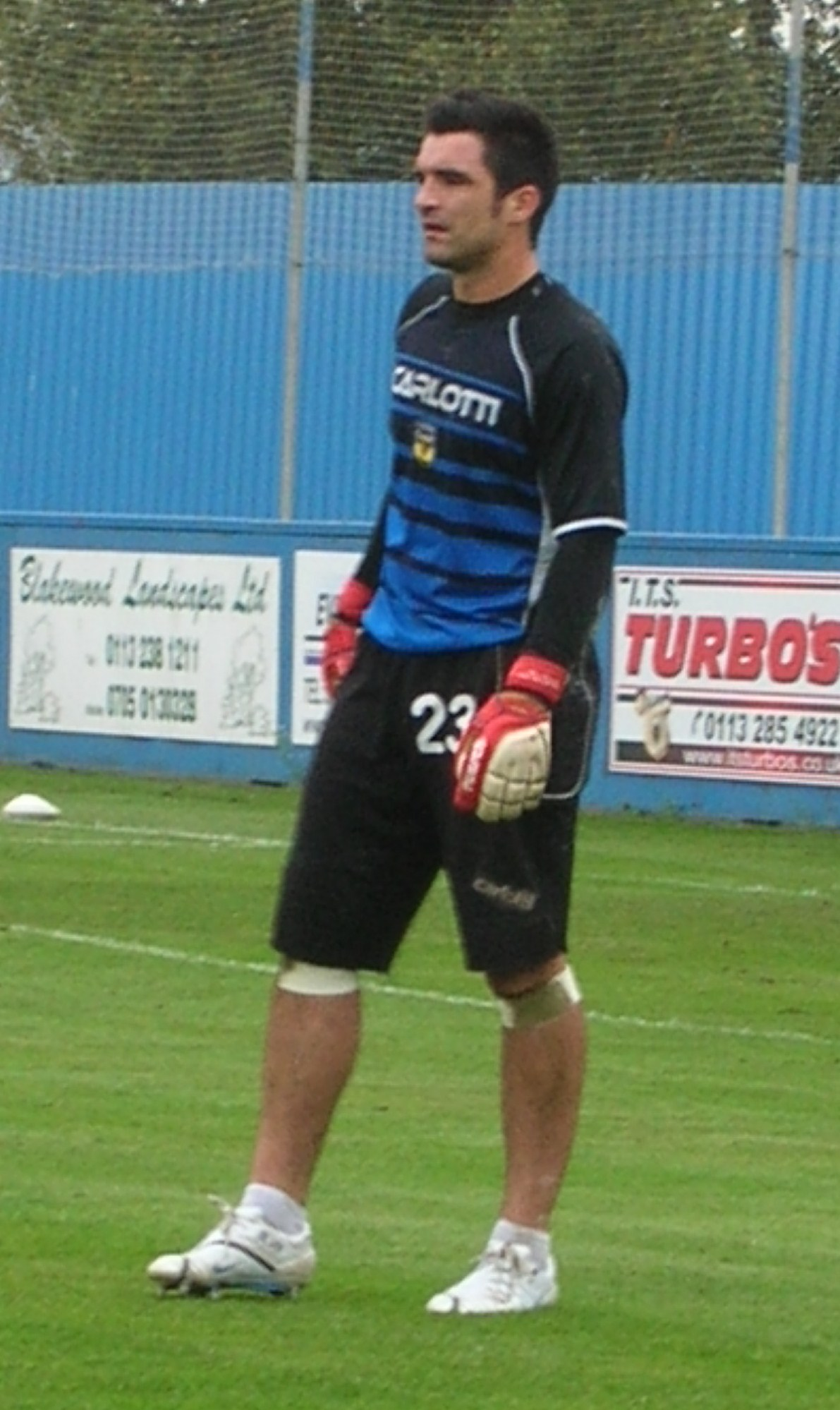

Personal information
- Full name: William Lee Turley
- Date of birth: 15 July 1973 (age 53)
- Place of birth: Wolverhampton, England
- Position: Goalkeeper

Senior career*
Years	Team	Apps	(Gls)
1994–1995	Evesham United		
1995–1999	Northampton Town	28	(0)
1998	→ Leyton Orient (loan)	19	(0)
1999–2005	Rushden & Diamonds	215	(0)
2005–2010	Oxford United	159	(0)
2010–2015	Brackley Town	144	(0)
Total		565	(0)
- * Club domestic league appearances and goals

William Lee Turley (born 15 July 1973) is an English retired football goalkeeper.

== Career ==
At Oxford United he was the first-choice goalkeeper under Jim Smith in the 2006–07 football season, ahead of Chris Tardif and continued to be during 2007–2009 under Darren Patterson and then Chris Wilder. He was liked by fans for his character and despite the occasional error, including missing a penalty in the penalty shoot-out loss to Exeter in the playoff semi-final in 2007, has produced some crucial saves for Oxford United. His banter, with fans and players alike, has made him an iconic figure in the Oxford United goal.

In 2002, while playing for Rushden & Diamonds, Turley became the first British footballer to test positive for an anabolic steroid. He escaped with only a warning from the Football Association (FA) after claiming that he had ingested the banned substance nandrolone unwittingly, suggesting that prescribed drugs could have triggered the positive result, and that a suspension would cause him distress due to personal problems. However, in 2004 Turley tested positive for the banned recreational drug cocaine, and was this time sacked by Rushden & Diamonds and handed a six-month ban by the FA. Richard Caborn, the sports minister at the time, questioned why the ban was not more severe, as in many other sports a second positive test would usually lead to a lifetime ban. On 29 May 2010 Turley signed for Southern League Premier Division team Brackley Town.

== Honours ==
Rushden & Diamonds

- Football League Third Division: 2002–03
