= Nene Park =

Sports venue in Northamptonshire, England

Coordinates: 52°19′40.92″N 0°35′59.97″W

- Nene Park in 2010
- Interactive map of Nene Park
- Location: Irthlingborough, Northamptonshire
- Owner: Conalgen Enterprises SA
- Capacity: 6,441 (4,641 seated)
- Record attendance: 6,431

Construction
- Opened: 1969
- Renovated: 1995 – 1998
- Closed: 2012
- Demolished: 27 February 2017 – 12 May 2017
- Cost: £30 million
- Architects: Rex Bryan Son & Pennock

Tenants
- Irthlingborough Diamonds (1969–1992); Rushden & Diamonds (1992–2011); Kettering Town (2011–2012)

Nene Park was a sports stadium in Irthlingborough, Northamptonshire, England, along the banks of the River Nene. From 1992 until the club's demise in 2011, it was the home ground of Rushden & Diamonds, and before that of predecessor Irthlingborough Diamonds. It became Kettering Town's home, but the club left in 2012 to play at Corby due to the costs of running the ground. Demolition began in 2017.

== History ==
=== Pre-Rushden & Diamonds ===
The original ground was built in 1969 as the home of Irthlingborough Diamonds, on land bought from the water board. In 1978, Nene Park became the first United Counties League stadium to have floodlights installed. They were turned on by Bobby Robson, then manager of Ipswich Town. He was watched by Brian Talbot, a player who managed the Rushden & Diamonds team some 20 years later.

=== After the merger ===
Beginning in February 1992, soon after the merger between Rushden Town and Irthlingborough Diamonds, the ground was radically redeveloped at an estimated cost of £30 million. In the first stage of the project, a new all-seater North Stand was built. It had a capacity of 1,000, and was completed in summer 1993, in time for the new football season. In the next stage, the old south stand, which included dressing rooms and the clubhouse, was torn down and replaced by another all-seater stand, similar in design to the North Stand, with a capacity of just over 1,000. The brand new Diamond Centre was erected, along with new floodlights and a freshly-laid pitch, as the stadium continued to take shape. The new structures were officially opened in April 1995 by the Prince of Wales. The focus then turned to the west side of the ground and the construction of the Peter De Banke (home) terrace, capable of holding 1,800.

With three sides of the ground complete and the capacity rising to over 4,000, only the new east stand, which was to be the focal point of the ground, remained to be constructed. Initially without a roof, the Airwair Stand was completed in December 1996, accommodating 2,372 spectators. During the following summer the roof was finally installed. The original plans also included the addition of a second tier should the club reach the Football League. However, another tier was never constructed. Although thought to be too big when built, the North Stand underwent some significant improvements. The press box was relocated further east along the stand to make room for brand new corporate boxes at the back of the structure. Behind the stand, new offices and administration facilities were built, as well as a 150 square-metre club souvenir 'Doc Shop'. The new complex was opened on 16 July 1998, by club chairman Max Griggs. During the 1997/1998 season, improvements were made to the adjacent training ground. New dressing rooms were constructed beside pitch two, with two entirely new training pitches (three and four) added to the Nene Park complex. Shortly before the 2000–01 season, the Dr. Martens Sports and Exhibition Centre was opened, which included a gymnasium, recreational facilities and offices. An all-weather pitch was developed later on in the season to complete the work. A Nando's outlet was also provided.

=== Later developments ===
In the mid 2000s, the all-seater Airwair Stand, the stadium's biggest, was closed. Falling attendances meant that keeping it open had become uneconomic, although it was opened when large numbers of travelling fans were expected, with a potential capacity of 2,372 if required. A section of the South Stand was allocated for teams with smaller followings. An unusual feature of the stadium was the model owls in each corner, to deter birds from nesting in the roof.

== Plans ==
Nene Park had permission to build a three-star, 150-bed hotel on its grounds. Strategic Director at Rushden & Diamonds, Helen Thompson said,

This is of huge significance to the Club to assist in working towards a sustainable future for the whole of the Nene Park Sports Complex and perpetuate the special gift that Max Griggs gave to the local community. Our personal thanks go to all those involved in supporting this application. In recent years Irthlingborough has unfortunately witnessed the redevelopment of many employment sites, we have a serious lack of local jobs. The range of full and part time positions this scheme will bring will provide an economic boost at a critical time, both during construction and once opened.

Nene Park was to be used as a training camp for athletes ahead of the 2012 London Olympics. The sports to be hosted were archery, fencing, football, judo, table tennis and wrestling.

On 11 December 2012, it was reported that Coventry City were considering moving to Nene Park, due to a rent dispute with their landlords at the Ricoh Arena. However, Coventry entered a ground-sharing agreement with Northampton Town, and played "home" matches at Northampton's Sixfields stadium during the 2013–14 season.

In September 2014, developers Rose Property Consultants announced plans to demolish Nene Park to make way for a leisure park, consisting of a multi-use football facility along with entertainment and retail zones.

On 27 February 2017, demolition started on the Nene Park site, and by 12 May 2017, the stadium had been completely demolished.

== Gallery ==
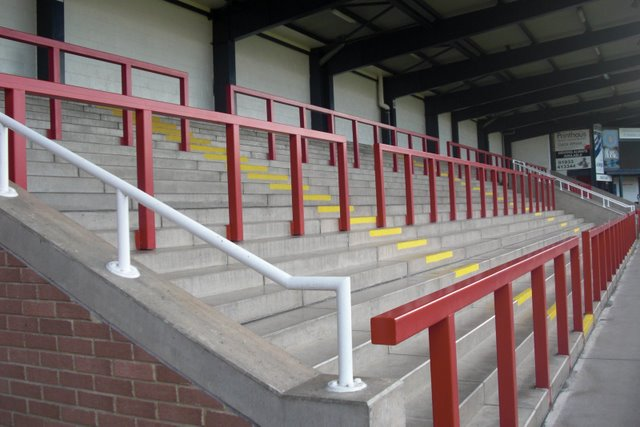
A portion of the Dale Roberts terrace

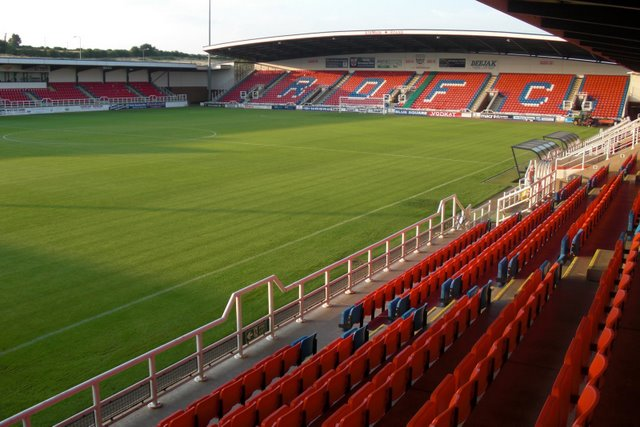
The view from the South Stand, looking over the pitch, the AirWair (right) and a section of the North Stand (left)

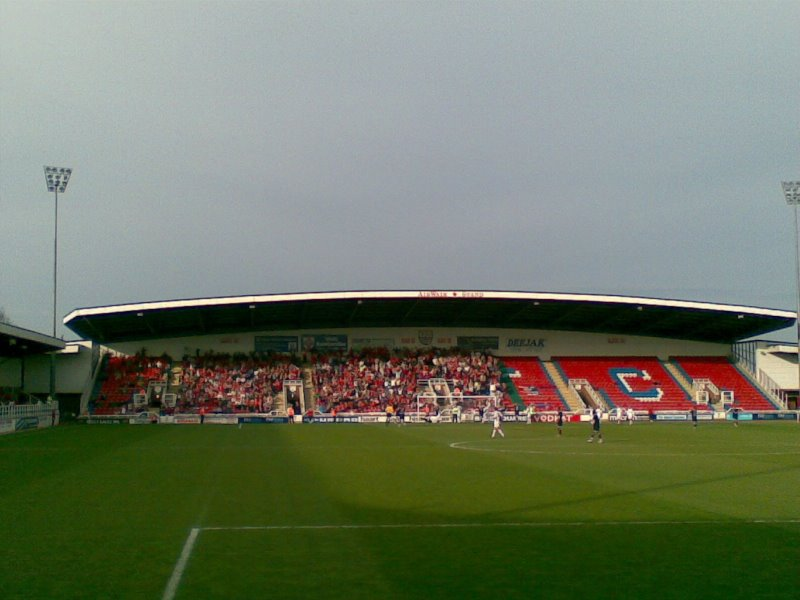
Aldershot fans in the Airwair Stand, celebrating their promotion to the Football League

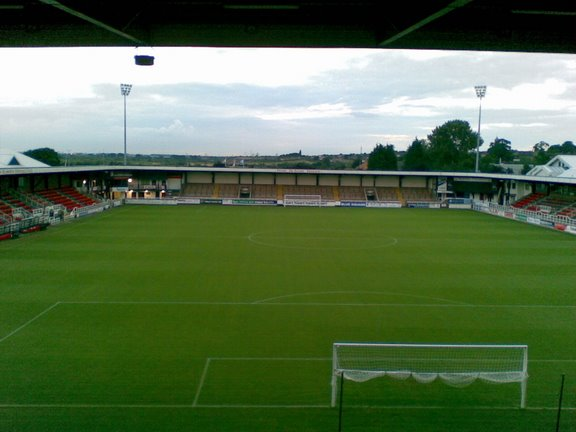
The view from the Airwair Stand, facing the Dale Roberts terrace

The site in 2012, when Kettering Town F.C. were tenants.

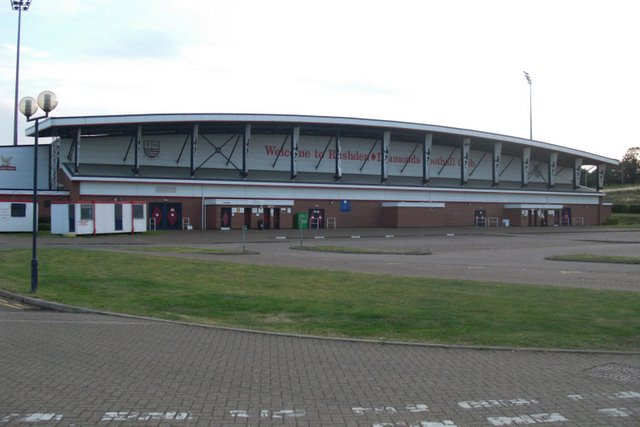
The exterior of Nene Park

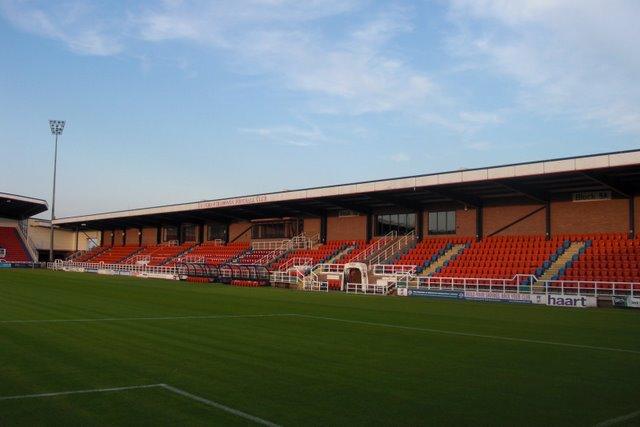
The South Stand

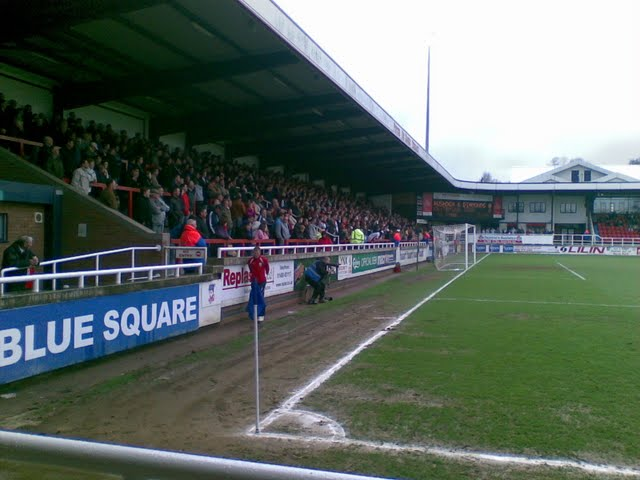
A packed Dale Roberts during Rushden's 1–0 win over Kettering

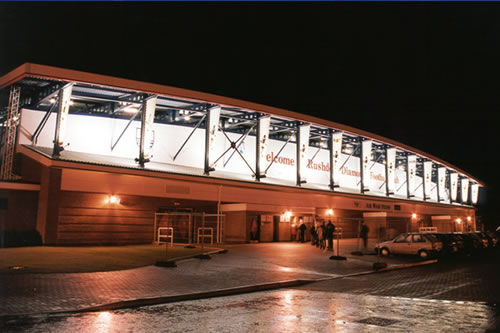
Exterior of the Airwair stand

== Average crowd sizes ==
| Season | Ave. Attendance | +/- ave. on prev. season | Competition | Occupier |
|---|---|---|---|---|
| 1992–93 | 322 | N/A | Southern Football League | Rushden and Diamonds |
| 1993–94 | 966 | +644 | Southern Football League | Rushden and Diamonds |
| 1994–95 | 1,521 | +855 | Southern Football League | Rushden and Diamonds |
| 1995–96 | 2,166 | +645 | Southern Football League | Rushden and Diamonds |
| 1996–97 | 2,514 | +348 | Conference National | Rushden and Diamonds |
| 1997–98 | 2,552 | +38 | Conference National | Rushden and Diamonds |
| 1998–99 | 3,041 | +489 | Conference National | Rushden and Diamonds |
| 1999–2000 | 3,298 | +257 | Conference National | Rushden and Diamonds |
| 2000–01 | 3,876 | +578 | Conference National | Rushden and Diamonds |
| 2001–02 | 4,403 | +527 | Third Division | Rushden and Diamonds |
| 2002–03 | 4,323 | -80 | Third Division | Rushden and Diamonds |
| 2003–04 | 4,457 | +134 | Second Division | Rushden and Diamonds |
| 2004–05 | 3,321 | -1,136 | League Two | Rushden and Diamonds |
| 2005–06 | 3,162 | -159 | League Two | Rushden and Diamonds |
| 2006–07 | 2,045 | -1,117 | Conference National | Rushden and Diamonds |
| 2007–08 | 1,586 | -459 | Conference National | Rushden and Diamonds |
| 2008–09 | 1,509 | -77 | Conference National | Rushden and Diamonds |
| 2009–10 | 1,678 | +169 | Conference National | Rushden and Diamonds |
| 2010–11 | 1,255 | -423 | Conference National | Rushden and Diamonds |
| 2011–12 | 1,399 | +144 | Conference National | Kettering Town |
| 2012–13* | 466 | -933 | Southern Football League | |

== Stands ==
The South Stand included the Diamond Centre and hospitality suites. Away fans, if travelling in small numbers, were situated in a block of this stand. There were 1,224 seats.

The North Stand was home to the press box and more hospitality suites. It held 976 people (all seated). After Kettering Town's demotion to the Southern League in 2012 it was decided to close this stand permanently due to lack of demand for the stand's capacity.

The Airwair Stand was the biggest stand in the stadium. Holding 2,372 fans, it was situated behind one of the goals. During Rushden and Diamonds' tenancy it was split between away fans and home fans. After the club's relegation to the Conference National it was closed in order to cut costs, only being used when a large number of away fans needed to be accommodated. That stayed the same during the first season of Kettering Town's tenancy. However, after their demotion to the Southern League it was permanently closed.

The Dale Roberts Terrace (Formerly the Peter De Banke Terrace), was named after the late former Rushden & Diamonds goalkeeper and fan favourite Dale Roberts, who died aged 24 in December 2010. It was opened in late 1994. Holding 1,800 fans, it was an all-standing covered terrace. Within two years of Max Griggs taking control of the club, the terrace was constructed, which replaced the temporary dressing rooms and offices.
