= 2002–03 Football League =

104th season of the Football League

The Football League
- Season: 2002–03
- Champions: Portsmouth
- Promoted: Portsmouth; Leicester City; Wolverhampton Wanderers
- Relegated: Shrewsbury Town; Exeter City
- New Club in League: Boston United

The 2002–03 Football League (known as the Nationwide Football League for sponsorship reasons) was the 104th completed season of The Football League.

Portsmouth won the First Division by some distance, passing manager Harry Redknapp's old club, West Ham on the way down. Leicester City earned a somewhat controversial promotion, as administration and a Creditor's Voluntary Agreement wrote off much of their debt. Partly as a result of this, the League would introduce a ten-point deduction for any teams going into administration from the next season onwards. The play-offs were won by Wolves, returning to the top flight after nearly 20 years and finally allowing owner Sir Jack Hayward to see the return he wanted on his years of investment.

Grimsby Town were relegated, after struggling in the division for five years on extremely limited resources. Both Brighton and Sheffield Wednesday suffered awful starts to the season (Brighton managing only a single win from their first sixteen matches), and despite good runs of form late in the season, neither were able to survive.

Wigan won their first promotion beyond the Second Division, helped by considerable investment in the team. Crewe Alexandra managed a promotion on considerably less resources, while play-off winners Cardiff City were another big-spending team that were able to earn promotion.

An ill-advised managerial change mid-season helped send Northampton down. Mansfield Town's first season out of the bottom division in over a decade ended as their previous spell had; with immediate relegation. Huddersfield started badly, and a financial crisis later in the season helped condemn them to relegation, only three years after they looked Premiership-bound. Cheltenham came close to survival, but a defeat on the final day of the season saw them return to the Third Division.

Rushden & Diamonds continued their meteoric rise, winning the Third Division title. They were helped in no small part by runners-up Hartlepool suffering a shocking late-season collapse, which cost them the title and manager Mike Newell his job. Wrexham took the last automatic promotion spot and bounced back from the previous season's relegation, as did play-off winners AFC Bournemouth.

A shock FA Cup victory over Everton did little to help Shrewsbury, and they finished bottom of the League. Exeter City were bought out pre-season in a high-profile takeover spearheaded by Uri Geller; Geller's associates proceeded to asset-strip the club, and despite a late-season run of form, Exeter fell victim to the first dual relegation from the League.

== Final league tables and results ==
The tables and results below are reproduced here in the exact form that they can be found at The Rec.Sport.Soccer Statistics Foundation website, with home and away statistics separated. Play-off results are from the same website.

== First Division ==
Football League, First Division
- Season: 2002–03
- Champions: Portsmouth (1st second tier title)
- Direct promotion to FA Premier League: Portsmouth, Leicester City
- Promoted to FA Premier League through play-offs: Wolverhampton Wanderers
- Relegated: Brighton & Hove Albion, Grimsby Town, Sheffield Wednesday
- Matches: 552
- Goals: 1,512 (2.74 per match)
- Top goalscorer: Svetoslav Todorov (Portsmouth), 26

Pos	Team	Pld	W	D	L	GF	GA	GD	Pts	Promotion or relegation
1	Portsmouth (C, P)	46	29	11	6	97	45	+52	98	Promotion to 2003–04 FA Premier League
2	Leicester City (P)	46	26	14	6	73	40	+33	92	Promotion to 2003–04 FA Premier League
3	Sheffield United	46	23	11	12	72	52	+20	80	Qualification for First Division Playoffs
4	Reading	46	25	4	17	61	46	+15	79	Qualification for First Division Playoffs
5	Wolverhampton Wanderers (O, P)	46	20	16	10	81	44	+37	76	Qualification for First Division Playoffs
6	Nottingham Forest	46	20	14	12	82	50	+32	74	Qualification for First Division Playoffs
7	Ipswich Town	46	19	13	14	80	64	+16	70	
8	Norwich City	46	19	12	15	60	49	+11	69	
9	Millwall	46	19	9	18	59	69	−10	66	
10	Wimbledon	46	18	11	17	76	73	+3	65	
11	Gillingham	46	16	14	16	56	65	−9	62	
12	Preston North End	46	16	13	17	68	70	−2	61	
13	Watford	46	17	9	20	54	70	−16	60	
14	Crystal Palace	46	14	17	15	59	52	+7	59	
15	Rotherham United	46	15	14	17	62	62	0	59	
16	Burnley	46	15	10	21	65	89	−24	55	
17	Walsall	46	15	9	22	57	69	−12	54	
18	Derby County	46	15	7	24	55	74	−19	52	
19	Bradford City	46	14	10	22	51	73	−22	52	
20	Coventry City	46	12	14	20	46	62	−16	50	
21	Stoke City	46	12	14	20	45	69	−24	50	
22	Sheffield Wednesday (R)	46	10	16	20	56	73	−17	46	Relegation to 2003–04 Second Division
23	Brighton & Hove Albion (R)	46	11	12	23	49	67	−18	45	Relegation to 2003–04 Second Division
24	Grimsby Town (R)	46	9	12	25	48	85	−37	39	Relegation to 2003–04 Second Division

Updated to match(es) played on 11 May 2003. Source: Soccerway
Rules for classification: 1) points; 2) goal difference; 3) number of goals scored.
(C) Champions; (O) Play-off winners; (P) Promoted; (R) Relegated

=== Play-offs ===
Semifinals; 1st leg – 10 May; 2nd leg – 14/15 May 2003
3rd	Sheffield United	1	4	5
6th	Nottingham Forest	1	3	4
4th	Reading	1	0	1
5th	Wolverhampton Wanderers	2	1	3

Final at Millennium Stadium, Cardiff; 26 May 2003
3rd	Sheffield United	0
5th	Wolverhampton Wanderers	3

=== First Division maps ===
Locations of the Football League First Division 2002–2003 teams
Locations of the Football League First Division London teams 2002–2003

== Second Division ==
Football League, Second Division
- Season: 2002–03
- Champions: Wigan Athletic (1st third tier title)
- Direct promotion: Wigan Athletic, Crewe Alexandra
- Promoted through play-offs: Cardiff City
- Relegated: Cheltenham Town, Huddersfield Town, Mansfield Town, Northampton Town
- Matches: 552
- Goals: 1,421 (2.57 per match)
- Top goalscorer: Robert Earnshaw (Cardiff City), 31

Pos	Team	Pld	W	D	L	GF	GA	GD	Pts	Promotion or relegation
1	Wigan Athletic (C, P)	46	29	13	4	68	25	+43	100	Promotion to Football League First Division
2	Crewe Alexandra (P)	46	25	11	10	76	40	+36	86	Promotion to Football League First Division
3	Bristol City	46	24	11	11	79	48	+31	83	Qualification for the Second Division play-offs
4	Queens Park Rangers	46	24	11	11	69	45	+24	83	Qualification for the Second Division play-offs
5	Oldham Athletic	46	22	16	8	68	38	+30	82	Qualification for the Second Division play-offs
6	Cardiff City (O, P)	46	23	12	11	68	43	+25	81	Qualification for the Second Division play-offs
7	Tranmere Rovers	46	23	11	12	66	57	+9	80	
8	Plymouth Argyle	46	17	14	15	63	52	+11	65	
9	Luton Town	46	17	14	15	67	62	+5	65	
10	Swindon Town	46	16	12	18	59	63	−4	60	
11	Peterborough United	46	14	16	16	51	54	−3	58	
12	Colchester United	46	14	16	16	52	56	−4	58	
13	Blackpool	46	15	13	18	56	64	−8	58	
14	Stockport County	46	15	10	21	65	70	−5	55	
15	Notts County	46	13	16	17	62	70	−8	55	
16	Brentford	46	14	12	20	47	56	−9	54	
17	Port Vale	46	14	11	21	54	70	−16	53	
18	Wycombe Wanderers	46	13	13	20	59	66	−7	52	
19	Barnsley	46	13	13	20	51	64	−13	52	
20	Chesterfield	46	14	8	24	43	73	−30	50	
21	Cheltenham Town (R)	46	10	18	18	53	68	−15	48	Relegation to Football League Third Division
22	Huddersfield Town (R)	46	11	12	23	39	61	−22	45	Relegation to Football League Third Division
23	Mansfield Town (R)	46	12	8	26	66	97	−31	44	Relegation to Football League Third Division
24	Northampton Town (R)	46	10	9	27	40	79	−39	39	Relegation to Football League Third Division

Rules for classification: In the Football League goals scored (GF) takes precedence over goal difference (GD).
(C) Champions; (O) Play-off winners; (P) Promoted; (R) Relegated

=== Play-offs ===
Semifinals; 1st leg – 10 May; 2nd leg – 13/14 May 2003
3rd	Bristol City	0	0	0
6th	Cardiff City	1	0	1
4th	Queens Park Rangers	1	1	2
5th	Oldham Athletic	1	0	1

Final at Millennium Stadium, Cardiff; 28 May 2003
6th	Cardiff City	1
4th	Queens Park Rangers (a.e.t.)	0

=== Second Division maps ===
Locations of the Football League Second Division 2002–2003 teams
Locations of the Football League Second Division London teams 2002–2003

== Third Division ==
Football League, Third Division
- Season: 2002–03
- Champions: Rushden & Diamonds (1st fourth tier title)
- Direct promotion: Rushden & Diamonds, Hartlepool United, Wrexham
- Promoted through play-offs: Bournemouth
- Relegated to Conference: Exeter City; Shrewsbury Town
- New club in the league: Boston United
- Matches: 552
- Goals: 1,419 (2.57 per match)
- Top goalscorer: Andy Morrell (Wrexham), 34

Pos	Team	Pld	W	D	L	GF	GA	GD	Pts	Promotion or relegation
1	Rushden & Diamonds (C, P)	46	24	15	7	73	47	+26	87	Promotion to Football League Second Division
2	Hartlepool United (P)	46	24	13	9	71	51	+20	85	Promotion to Football League Second Division
3	Wrexham (P)	46	23	15	8	84	50	+34	84	Promotion to Football League Second Division
4	Bournemouth (O, P)	46	20	14	12	60	48	+12	74	Qualification for the Third Division play-offs
5	Scunthorpe United	46	19	15	12	68	49	+19	72	Qualification for the Third Division play-offs
6	Lincoln City	46	18	16	12	46	37	+9	70	Qualification for the Third Division play-offs
7	Bury	46	18	16	12	57	56	+1	70	Qualification for the Third Division play-offs
8	Oxford United	46	19	12	15	57	47	+10	69	
9	Torquay United	46	16	18	12	71	71	0	66	
10	York City	46	17	15	14	52	53	−1	66	
11	Kidderminster Harriers	46	16	15	15	62	63	−1	63	
12	Cambridge United	46	16	13	17	67	70	−3	61	
13	Hull City	46	14	17	15	58	53	+5	59	
14	Darlington	46	12	18	16	58	59	−1	54	
15	Boston United	46	15	13	18	55	56	−1	54 (Note: Boston United had 4 points deducted for financial irregularities.)	
16	Macclesfield Town	46	14	12	20	57	63	−6	54	
17	Southend United	46	17	3	26	47	59	−12	54	
18	Leyton Orient	46	14	11	21	51	61	−10	53	
19	Rochdale	46	12	16	18	63	70	−7	52	
20	Bristol Rovers	46	12	15	19	50	57	−7	51	
21	Swansea City	46	12	13	21	48	65	−17	49	
22	Carlisle United	46	13	10	23	52	78	−26	49	
23	Exeter City (R)	46	11	15	20	50	64	−14	48	Relegation to Football Conference
24	Shrewsbury Town (R)	46	9	14	23	62	92	−30	41	Relegation to Football Conference

Rules for classification: In the Football League goals scored (GF) takes precedence over goal difference (GD).
(C) Champions; (O) Play-off winners; (P) Promoted; (R) Relegated

=== Play-offs ===
Semifinals; 1st leg −10 May; 2nd leg −13/14 May 2003
4th	Bournemouth	0	3	3
7th	Bury	0	1	1
5th	Scunthorpe United	3	0	3
6th	Lincoln City	5	1	6

Final at Millennium Stadium, Cardiff; 24 May 2003
4th	Bournemouth	5
6th	Lincoln City	2

=== Third Division maps ===
Locations of the Football League Third Division teams 2002–2003
Locations of the Football League Third Division London teams 2002–2003

== See also ==
- 2002–03 in English football
- 2002 in association football
- 2003 in association football
