= Rushden & Diamonds F.C. =

Former English association football club

Rushden & Diamonds
- Full name: Rushden & Diamonds Football Club
- Nickname: The Diamonds
- Founded: 1992; 34 years ago
- Dissolved: 2011; 15 years ago
- Ground: Nene Park; Irthlingborough
- Capacity: 6,441 (4,641 seated)
- 2010–11: Conference National, 13th
| Home colours | Away colours |

Rushden & Diamonds Football Club was an association football club based in Irthlingborough, Northamptonshire, England. Nicknamed "The Diamonds", the club played at Nene Park. The club's main rivals were county neighbours Kettering Town.

The club was formed by a merger of Rushden Town and Irthlingborough Diamonds in 1992. They entered the Southern League and won the Midland Division in the 1993–94 season and the Premier Division in the 1995–96 season. They then spent five seasons in the Conference National, before they won a place in the Football League after winning the 2000–01 Conference title. They lost the 2002 play-off final and then secured promotion into the Second Division after winning the Third Division title in 2002–03. Relegated the following season, they lost their Football League status after finishing bottom of League Two in 2006. The club were expelled from the Conference on 11 June 2011; their unstable financial position meant they could not guarantee to complete all their fixtures in the 2011–12 season, and resulted in their dissolution. They were succeeded by phoenix club AFC Rushden & Diamonds.

== History ==
=== The merger and the early years (1992–96) ===
Rushden and Diamonds was formed on 21 April 1992 by a merger of Rushden Town and Irthlingborough Diamonds. The move was the brainchild of Max Griggs. On 22 August 1992, Ollie Kearns scored the first league goal in the club's history, against Bilston Town in the Southern League Midland Division. The club's first few seasons were remarkable for the success the team enjoyed, finishing 3rd in the Southern League Midland Division in their inaugural season. The following year they won the division, winning promotion to the Southern League Premier Division, and two years later the Diamonds were again promoted as champions. The team had gained promotion to the Football Conference after just four years as a club.

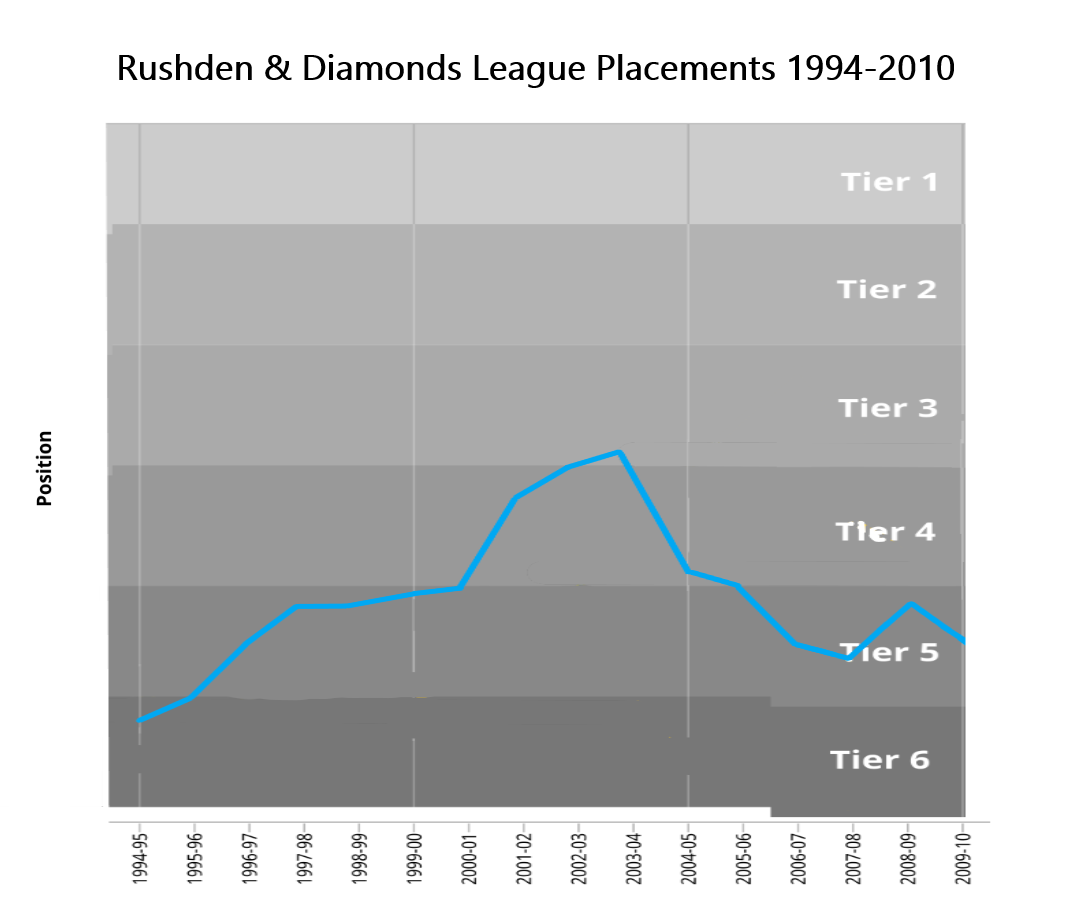
Rushden & Diamonds League Finishes from 1994 to their liquidation

=== Football Conference ===
After their rapid rise to the top tier of non-league football, the club then spent five seasons attempting to reach the Football League, finishing 12th in the 1996–97 season, and then 4th, 4th and 2nd in the Football Conference before they finally won promotion to the Football League as champions in 2001. It was within this period that the club had achieved their best success in the FA Cup, getting to the 3rd Round twice. In 1998–99, the Diamonds held Leeds United to a famous 0–0 draw at Nene Park, ahead of a record attendance of 6,431. After taking a shock early lead at Elland Road in the replay, they went on to lose 3–1. In the following campaign, the club were rewarded with a 3rd Round draw away to Sheffield United. The Diamonds secured a 1–1 draw at Bramall Lane, to force a replay. In the return fixture, the match went to penalties following a 1–1 deadlock after extra-time. In the shootout however, it was the Blades who finally edged the Diamonds out 6–5 to go through.

=== The Football League ===
In their first season in new surroundings, the Diamonds reached the Division Three Play-Off Final. After overcoming Rochdale 4–3 on aggregate over the two-legged Semi-Final, the club lost to Cheltenham Town in the final, 3–1 at the Millennium Stadium. In 2003, they won the division, pipping Hartlepool United to the Division Three championship on the last day of the season – their third promotion/league title in eight seasons.

The 2003–04 season in Division Two proved to be one of difficulty for Rushden & Diamonds. Despite a promising early start, a run of bad results over the winter period saw the club slip down the table, and in March 2004 Brian Talbot left the club after seven years as manager. The transfer window saw star players Paul Underwood, Onandi Lowe, Paul Hall and Marcus Bignot all depart as off the pitch problems mounted, and the club severely struggled for the remainder of the season. Barry Hunter took over as caretaker player-manager but they were relegated in 22nd place after losing their last three games of the season.

Ernie Tippett was confirmed as permanent manager for the start of the 2004–05 season. However, after a dismal run of results which saw the team the media predicted as promotion contenders fall to 22nd place in the League Two, he was sacked, and replaced by Barry Hunter, who was later appointed full-time manager. The club staved off relegation. The following season, after a summer in which Max Griggs handed the club over to the Supporters' Trust, the club continued to struggle and on 29 April, Rushden were relegated back to the Football Conference after a 2–0 away defeat to Boston United. Hunter's contract was not renewed over the summer.

=== Back in the Conference ===
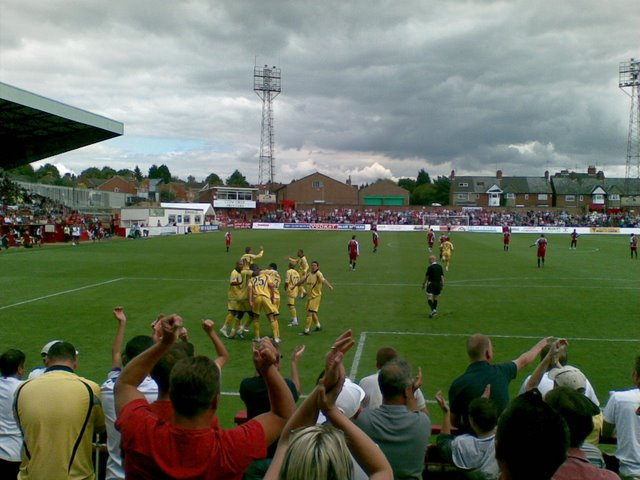
Rushden & Diamonds playing against Kettering in 2008.

The seasons following the Diamonds' return to the Football Conference were marred by instability on and off the pitch. Keith Cousins took over the club in November 2006 and resigned in 2011. He was replaced by Liam Beasant and Gary Calder, the latter of whom himself quit the club just weeks after taking over. Meanwhile, five managers (Paul Hart, Tony Godden, Graham Westley, Garry Hill, and Justin Edinburgh) took control of the team at different times.

During their first three seasons back in England's fifth division the Diamonds failed to finish in the top ten. By the end of the 2008–09 season, the average attendance was less than 50% of what it had been during their last season in the Football League. The sole highlight of these three years was reaching the Conference League Cup Final against Aldershot Town in 2007. With the scores level at 3–3 after extra-time, the Diamonds lost 4–3 on penalties.

However, the Diamonds' fortunes changed after the resignation of Garry Hill in February 2009, and the subsequent appointment of Justin Edinburgh as manager – initially as caretaker, but then full-time. During his first full season in charge, he led the club to the Football Conference play-offs as a result of finishing in 4th place– their first top-ten finish since 2003. The team eventually succumbed to a 3–1 aggregate defeat at the hands of eventual play-off winners Oxford United. The Diamonds also progressed to the second round of the FA Cup, having defeated Workington and Hinckley United before being knocked out by Brighton & Hove Albion at the Withdean Stadium.

The Diamonds struggled to replicate their successes the following season. During the summer and throughout the season some of the most influential players of the previous campaign left Nene Park, including Lee Tomlin, Mark Byrne, Jamie Stuart and Paul Terry. The Diamonds struggled to make a serious play-off push, and by mid-April were 10th in the table, some thirteen points off a promotion spot. Disappointing runs in the FA Cup, FA Trophy and Hillier Cup did little to consolidate the campaign.

Off-pitch events, however, defined the season. Any footballing disappointments were overshadowed by the death of first-team (and England C national football team 2010 Player of the Year) goalkeeper Dale Roberts on 14 December 2010. Meanwhile, chairman Keith Cousins resigned and was replaced by Gary Calder and Liam Beasant. Little over a month later vice-chairman Helen Thompson resigned from her position also, while by March – just three months after taking charge – Calder himself quit the club. As the season drew to an end, it was also revealed that the club was under a transfer embargo, and that only the intervention of the PFA prevented the Diamonds players refusing to play a game against Mansfield Town in March due to unpaid wages. Early in the season, the club had also become involved in a very public row with ex-player Leon Knight, who took to Twitter to air his grievances against the club.

=== Decline ===
The club were expelled from the Conference National on 11 June 2011, because their unstable financial position meant they could not guarantee being able to complete all their fixtures in the 2011–12 season. The club faced a winding-up petition, lodged by HM Revenue and Customs in the week commencing 13 June 2011, with reported debts of £750,000. An application in July to move to enter the Southern Football League was unsuccessful, and the club entered administration on 7 July 2011.

Fans immediately announced their desire to create a new fan-owned club called AFC Rushden & Diamonds that would field a senior side in 2012. The new club started in the United Counties League Division One.

== Club badge ==
The club's traditional colours are red, white and blue, which are reflected in the club's badge. The crest uses aspects from both the respective Rushden Town and Irthlingborough Diamonds badges. It is formed by a shield-like shape, with 'R&DFC' written in banner form underneath. In the top left corner is the Rampant Lion, representing the Sartoris family, who donated some land on Hayden Road to Rushden Sports Club in 1922.

On the opposite side at the top sit the Crosskeys of St. Peter's Church in Irthlingborough. Taken from the old Irthlingborough Diamonds crest, there are two keys, one for heaven and one for hell. Below the Lion in the bottom left quarter of the badge are the 'Blue Diamonds', taken from the old Irthlingborough Diamonds logo. Similarly, the three 'Red and White Hoops' sitting to the right originate from Rushden Town's badge. An illustration of the local River Nene runs through the centre of the badge, whilst the football located between the Diamonds and Hoops is self-explanatory.

== Stadium ==
Nene Park

Rushden & Diamonds played their home games at Nene Park, which was located on the outskirts of Irthlingborough, Northamptonshire adjacent to the A6, the stadium had a capacity of 6,441 (4,641 seated).

Initially the home of Irthlingborough Diamonds (the ground was obtained from the water board in 1969, providing the home for Irthlingborough Diamonds for over 20 years.), the stadium became the home of Rushden and Diamonds following the merger, and underwent major improvements during the 1990s and early 2000s as the club climbed up through the divisions.

The ground had also played host to England U21s games, as well as England C internationals. It served as a training camp for athletes competing at the 2012 London Olympics.

== Rivalries ==
=== Kettering Town ===
Rushden's main rivals were nearby Kettering Town. The clubs played seventeen competitive games together, 16 in the Conference National and one in the FA Cup. The first competitive game between the sides was played out on 8 March 1997, with Rushden running out 5–1 winners at Rockingham Road. In the early years, derby games between the two would regularly attract crowds in excess of 4,500. The clubs remained in the same division for five seasons before, in 2001, Rushden gained promotion to the Football League, while Kettering were relegated that same season from the Conference. After a seven-year gap, in 2008–09 the teams again found themselves in the same division, after Rushden suffered two relegations and Kettering gained promotion from the Conference North.

In the 16 league games contested and over 1,000 minutes of league football played between the two sides, Kettering won just twice, while Rushden recorded nine victories. In the same number of games, Rushden scored 25 goals to Kettering's eight. On 3 January 2011, for the most recent game between the two sides, Kettering ended an 11-year wait for a win over the Diamonds, defeating Rushden for only the second time in their history with a 2–1 triumph at Nene Park. Throughout the history of the fixture, Rushden & Diamonds maintained an impressive of record of having never lost a competitive away match against Kettering Town.

Past fixtures between the clubs played host to some unsavoury incidents. Diamonds frontman Duane Darby was charged with assault in November 2000, after a head-butting incident in the players tunnel, after a home match with Kettering on 23 September 2000. In a friendly match between the teams at Kettering in 2005, two flares were thrown onto the pitch. During another match between the two sides at Rockingham Road on Shrove Tuesday in 1998, eggs and flour were thrown over the wall at the Rushden fans. In a game between the two teams at Nene Park in 2009, a flare was thrown onto the playing surface from the Rushden section, prompting an investigation. That game also saw nine arrests, and the use of 60 police officers and a police helicopter.

=== Northampton Town ===
The rivalry between the Diamonds and Northampton Town occurred between 2004 and 2006, when the two clubs played in League Two together for two seasons. Eight games were played between the sides – four competitive league games and four pre-season cup games. The Diamonds recorded a sole league victory over Northampton, a 3–2 win at Nene Park during the 2004–2005 season after a last minute goal from Billy Sharp. They also defeated their rivals in two pre-season Maunsell Cup games. After the Diamonds' relegation out of the Football League this rivalry diminished in relevance, especially as this relegation led to the re-ignition of the Rushden–Kettering rivalry.

=== Other local rivals ===
Rushden also enjoyed rivalries with various other clubs throughout their history. Peterborough United and Luton Town were seen as small rivals during the club's Football League days, due to the relative geographical proximity of the three clubs. Following the Diamonds' relegation into the Conference, however (despite Luton's presence there also from 2009) these rivalries diminished considerably.

Rushden also had past rivalries from the club's younger years with Kidderminster Harriers, Cheltenham Town, and Yeovil Town, with the three clubs often competing against each other in their various play-off and championship pushes.

== Managers ==
| Tenure | Manager | Notes | Win ratio |
|---|---|---|---|
| 1992–97 | Roger Ashby | Southern League Midland Division Champions 1994 Southern League Premier Division Champions 1996 | 56% |
| 1997–2004 | Brian Talbot | Conference National Champions 2001 Football League Third Division Play-Off Finalists 2002 Football League Third Division Champions 2003 | 48% |
| 2004 | Barry Hunter | Caretaker | |
| 2004–05 | Ernie Tippett | | 17% |
| 2005 | Barry Hunter | Caretaker | |
| 2005–06 | Barry Hunter | | 24% |
| 2006 | Paul Hart | | 25% |
| 2006 | Tony Godden | Caretaker | 44% |
| 2006–07 | Graham Westley | | 62% |
| 2007–09 | Garry Hill | Conference Cup Runners-Up 2008 | 33% |
| 2009 | Justin Edinburgh | Caretaker | 42% |
| 2009–11 | Justin Edinburgh | Conference National Play-Off Semi-Finalists 2010 | 46% |

== Players ==
=== Retired numbers ===
1 – (England) Dale Roberts, Goalkeeper (2008–10) – posthumous honour.

=== Most appearances ===
Eight players have made over 200 appearances for the club:

| # | Player | Career | Appearances |
|---|---|---|---|
| 1 | (England) Garry Butterworth | 1994–2002 | 371 |
| 2 | (England) Andy Burgess | 1999–2006 & 2007–09 | 333 |
| 3 | (England) Paul Underwood | 1997–2004 | 301 |
| 4 | (England) Darren Collins | 1994–2000 | 286 |
| 5 | (England) Billy Turley | 1999–2004 | 253 |
| 6 | (England) Tim Wooding | 1997–2000 | 247 |
| 7 | (England) Jim Rodwell | 1996–2002 | 207 |
| 8 | (England) Andy Peaks | 1992–1997 | 205 |

=== Most goals ===
Top ten all-time goalscorers:

| # | Player | Career | Appearances | Goals | Goals per game ratio |
|---|---|---|---|---|---|
| 1 | (England) Darren Collins | 1994–2000 | 286 | 152 | 0.53 |
| 2 | (England) Dale Watkins | 1993–96 | 162 | 98 | 0.60 |
| 3 | (England) Mickey Nuttel | 1993–96 | 115 | 63 | 0.55 |
| 4 | (Jamaica) Onandi Lowe | 2001–04 | 97 | 52 | 0.54 |
| 5 | (England) Duane Darby | 2000–03 | 130 | 51 | 0.39 |
| 6 | (England) Andy Kirkup | 1992–96 | 166 | 48 | 0.29 |
| 7 | (England) Adie Mann | 1992–95 | 130 | 44 | 0.34 |
| 8 | (Canada) Simeon Jackson | 2004–08 | 104 | 43 | 0.41 |
| 8 | (England) Kevin Wilkin | 1995–97 | 95 | 43 | 0.45 |
| 10 | (England) Michael Rankine | 2006–09 | 144 | 40 | 0.28 |

=== Other records ===
- Biggest home victory: Rushden & Diamonds 8–0 Gateshead, 13 March 2010.
- Biggest away victory: Weymouth 0–9 Rushden & Diamonds, 21 February 2009.
- Heaviest defeat: Coventry City 8–0 Rushden & Diamonds, League Cup, 2 October 2002.
- Record attendance: 6,431, vs Leeds United, FA Cup third round, 2 January 1999.
- Most goals in a league season: Darren Collins, 30, 1995–96.

== Honours ==
League

- Third Division (level 4)
  - Champions: 2002–03
- Football Conference (level 5)
  - Champions: 2000–01
- Southern League Premier Division
  - Champions: 1995–96
- Southern League Division One Midlands
  - Champions: 1993–94

Cup

- Conference League Cup
  - Runners-up: 2007–08
- NFA Hillier Cup
  - Winners: 1994, 1999, 2007, 2008
- NFA Maunsell Cup
  - Winners: 1995, 2000, 2006, 2008
- Conference Shield
  - Winners: 2001
- Southern League Championship Cup
  - Winners: 1997
