= 1993 Fort Lauderdale Strikers season =

Fort Lauderdale Strikers
1993 season
- Owners: (United States) Joe Robbie; Noel Lemon
- Manager: Thomas Rongen
- Stadium: Lockhart Stadium
- APSL: Sixth place
- APSL playoffs: did not qualify
Home colors	Away colors

1993 Fort Lauderdale Strikers season

The 1993 Fort Lauderdale Strikers season was the club's 27th season in professional soccer and its fourth in the American Professional Soccer League (APSL). The Strikers played their home games at Lockhart Stadium in Fort Lauderdale, Florida. The team finished the season in sixth place out of seven teams in the APSL, failing to qualify for the playoffs.

- Manager: Thomas Rongen Rongen, a former Strikers player, managed the team through the season with a 37% success rate, earning 8 victories in 24 matches.
- Assistant Manager: Emilio Romero Romero continued to serve as the team's assistant manager during this season.

Season Results: The Strikers struggled to find consistent form throughout the season. Despite some competitive matches, they ended with one of the lowest points tallies in the league and did not make the postseason.

League Standings: The Strikers placed 6th in the 1993 APSL regular season, finishing just above Montreal Impact but well behind league leaders Vancouver 86ers.

== Background ==
The American Professional Soccer League (APSL) was the top professional soccer league in the United States in 1993. Formed from the merger of the Western Soccer League and the American Soccer League in 1990, the APSL aimed to foster the growth of soccer in the U.S. during a period when professional soccer was still gaining traction domestically. The 1993 season was notable for its ongoing efforts to keep soccer relevant in the lead-up to the 1994 FIFA World Cup, which was to be hosted by the United States.

The 1993 season featured a competitive field, with teams like the Vancouver 86ers and the Colorado Foxes dominating the regular season standings. Despite the growth of the sport and increased fan interest, the league still faced challenges, including financial instability and fluctuating attendance figures.

The Fort Lauderdale Strikers, managed by Thomas Rongen, finished the season in sixth place, missing the playoffs. Solid performances were key to keeping the team competitive in many matches despite their struggles in defense. However, the team ultimately fell short, with a goal differential that reflected their difficulties in balancing attack and defense.

== Rankings ==
=== APSL regular season ===
Place	Team	GP	W	L	WN	WE	WS	LN	LE	LS	GF	GA	GD	Points
1	Vancouver 86ers	24	15	9	11	2	2	8	0	1	43	35	+8	126
2	Colorado Foxes	24	15	9	12	0	3	6	3	0	40	34	+6	121
3	Tampa Bay Rowdies	24	12	12	10	2	0	10	1	1	53	47	+6	118
4	Los Angeles Salsa	24	12	12	8	1	3	9	0	3	41	37	+4	109
5	Toronto Blizzard	24	10	14	8	2	0	11	1	2	35	41	-6	97
6	Fort Lauderdale Strikers	24	9	15	8	0	1	11	1	3	39	52	-13	94
7	Montreal Impact	24	11	13	9	0	2	11	1	1	28	33	-5	90

== Statistics ==
=== League Performance ===
- Matches Played: 24
- Victories: 8
- Draws: 4
- Losses: 12
- Goals For (GF): 39
- Goals Against (GA): 52
- Goal Difference: -13

=== Match Results ===
Date	Opponent	Result	Goals For	Goals Against
04/04/1993	Tampa Bay Rowdies	W 3-2	3	2
12/04/1993	Los Angeles Salsa	L 2-3	2	3
18/04/1993	Impact de Montréal	L 0-1	0	1
25/04/1993	Colorado Foxes	L 1-2	1	2
02/05/1993	Vancouver 86ers	W 2-0	2	0
09/05/1993	Toronto Blizzard	W 4-1	4	1
16/05/1993	Tampa Bay Rowdies	L 0-2	0	2
23/05/1993	Los Angeles Salsa	W 3-0	3	0
30/05/1993	Impact de Montréal	L 1-4	1	4
06/06/1993	Colorado Foxes	W 2-1	2	1
13/06/1993	Vancouver 86ers	L 1-3	1	3
20/06/1993	Toronto Blizzard	L 0-2	0	2
27/06/1993	Tampa Bay Rowdies	L 1-2	1	2
04/07/1993	Los Angeles Salsa	W 3-1	3	1
11/07/1993	Impact de Montréal	D 2-2	2	2
18/07/1993	Colorado Foxes	W 1-0	1	0
25/07/1993	Vancouver 86ers	L 0-3	0	3
01/08/1993	Toronto Blizzard	L 2-3	2	3
08/08/1993	Tampa Bay Rowdies	L 0-3	0	3
15/08/1993	Los Angeles Salsa	D 1-1	1	1
22/08/1993	Impact de Montréal	D 1-1	1	1
29/08/1993	Colorado Foxes	L 0-4	0	4
05/09/1993	Vancouver 86ers	L 0-5	0	5
12/09/1993	Toronto Blizzard	W 2-1	2	1
19/09/1993	Tampa Bay Rowdies	D 1-1	1	1
26/09/1993	Los Angeles Salsa	W 3-2	3	2

=== Top Performers ===
- Top Scorer:
  - Marcelo Carrera - Scored a total of 12 goals throughout the season.
- Most Assists:
  - Shawn Medved - Provided 8 assists, showcasing strong playmaking abilities.

=== Match Statistics ===
- Matches Without Scoring: 2
- Matches Without Conceding: 2
- Drawn Games: 4
- Matches with More than 2.5 Goals: 18
- Average Goals Per Match: 1.63
- Clean Sheets: 3 (matches where the opponent did not score)

=== Player Statistics ===
Name	Position	GP/GS	Min	G
Jeff Betts	D	3/2	213	0
Scott Brennen		18/16	1541	0
Marcelo Carrera	M	17/16	1477	2
Juan Castillo	F	18/16	1530	1
John Clare	D	14/14	1296	1
Jean Derivois	M	1/1	43	0
Jefferson Doe	F	2/0	15	0
Zico Doe	F	23/20	1896	12
Troy Edwards	D	5/5	442	0
Eric Eichmann	F	19/17	1586	5
Dennis Hamlett	D	11/10	924	0
Alvin James	M	18/15	1330	7
Stan Lembryk	D	8/7	645	0
Zenon Luzniak	D	23/22	2041	0
Lalo Maradona	M	8/7	623	2
Andrew McKay	D	14/12	1099	2
Ivan McKinley	F	5/5	465	0
Shawn Medved	F	16/16	1485	0
Thomas Rongen	M	1/0	21	0
Alex Sanchez	M	20/10	989	2
Kenny Santos	M	20/19	1919	2
Patrick Tardieu	F	12/10	992	3
Jose Umanda	D	1/1	78	0

=== Goalkeeper Statistics ===
Name	GP/GS	Min	GA	Sho	GAA
Chris Antonopoulos	2/1	141	7	0	4.47
Juan Castillo	1/0	10	0	0	0.00
Mario Jimenez	4/4	350	3	0	0.77
Jorge Valenzuela	19/19	1748	42	2	2.16

== Transfers ==
=== Players In ===
- Jeff Betts (University of Portland) - Arrived on January 1, 1993
- Stan Lembryk (Loyola University Maryland) - Arrived on January 1, 1993
- Shawn Medved (Colorado Foxes) - Arrived on January 1, 1993
- Marcelo Carrera (Power) - Arrived on July 1, 1993
- Chris Antonopoulos (Florida International University) - Arrived on May 20, 1993

Players Out

- Omid Namazi - Transferred to Reading on December 6, 1992
- Jeff Betts - Released on June 18, 1993
- Neil Covone - Retired on January 1, 1993
- Arnie Mausser - Retired on January 1, 1993
