= Myles Stoddard =

American soccer player

Personal information
- Date of birth: January 7, 1977 (age 49)
- Place of birth: Reno, Nevada, United States
- Height: 5 ft 8 in (1.73 m)
- Position: Forward

Senior career*
Years	Team	Apps	(Gls)
1996	Reno Rattlers		
1997–1998	Nashville Metros	35	(0)
1999–2001	Utah Freezz (indoor)	62	(27)
2002–2005	Cleveland Foce (indoor)	68	(22)
2006–2007	California Cougars (indoor)	9	(3)
Total		174	(52)

International career
1997	United States U20	1	(0)
- * Club domestic league appearances and goals

Myles Stoddard (born January 7, 1977) is a former American soccer player.

== Career statistics ==
=== Club ===
Club	Season	League			Cup		Other		Total	
Club	Season	Division	Apps	Goals	Apps	Goals	Apps	Goals	Apps	Goals
Nashville Metros	1997	USISL A-League	9	0	0	0	0	0	9	0
Nashville Metros	1998	USISL A-League	26	0	0	0	0	0	26	0
Nashville Metros	Total		35	0	0	0	0	0	35	0
Utah Freezz	1999	World Indoor Soccer League	21	8	0	0	0	0	21	8
Utah Freezz	2000	World Indoor Soccer League	22	6	0	0	0	0	22	6
Utah Freezz	2001	World Indoor Soccer League	19	13	0	0	0	0	19	13
Utah Freezz	Total		62	27	0	0	0	0	62	27
Cleveland Foce	2002–03	MISL	23	5	0	0	0	0	23	5
Cleveland Foce	2003–04	MISL	34	13	0	0	0	0	34	13
Cleveland Foce	2004–05	MISL	11	4	0	0	0	0	11	4
Cleveland Foce	Total		68	22	0	0	0	0	68	22
California Cougars	2006–07	MISL	9	3	0	0	0	0	9	3
Career total			174	52	0	0	0	0	174	52
