= Jason Vanacour =

American lawyer

Personal information
- Full name: Jason Scott Vanacour
- Date of birth: June 14, 1971 (age 55)
- Place of birth: United States
- Height: 5 ft 10 in (1.78 m)
- Positions: Forward; midfielder

College career
Years	Team	Apps	(Gls)
1989–1993	Stanford Cardinal		

Senior career*
Years	Team	Apps	(Gls)
1992	Palo Alto Firebirds		
1993–1994	German leagues		
1994–1995	Arizona Sandsharks (indoor)	52	(11)
1995	Austrian league		
1995–1997	Tampa Bay Terror (indoor)	54	(15)
1996	Jacksonville Cyclones		
1997	Arizona Sandsharks (indoor)		
1997–1998	Cincinnati Silverbacks (indoor)	38	(12)
1998	Arizona Sahuaros		
1998–2000	Arizona Thunder (indoor)	53	(27)
2000–2001	Tucson Fireballs	17	(5)
- * Club domestic league appearances and goals

Jason Vanacour is a retired American soccer player who is the general counsel for the United States Youth Soccer Association. Vanacour played professionally in the National Professional Soccer League, USISL Select League, Continental Indoor Soccer League and had stints in Germany and Austria.

Vanacour grew up in Arizona, playing for the Cisco Lightning Soccer Club. He graduated from Cactus High School and attended Stanford University, playing on the men's soccer team from 1989 to 1993. During the 1992 collegiate off-season, Vanacour played for the Palo Alto Firebirds in the USISL. Vanacour graduated with a bachelor's degrees in political science and economics. In the summer of 1993, Vanacour played for the United States National B Team. Following graduation from Stanford, he worked briefly as a stockbroker, but left the job to play for the National B Team in a game in Bermuda. He then decided to pursue a professional playing career, joining the Arizona Sandsharks of the Continental Indoor Soccer League in 1994. He spent two seasons with the Sandsharks. During this time Vanacour also had brief stints in Germany and Austria, including traveling and playing with Casino Salzburg of the Austrian Bundesliga. In the fall of 1995, Vanacour moved to Florida to sign with the Tampa Bay Terror of the National Professional Soccer League. In 1996, he did not play for Arizona during the summer indoor season, but remained in Florida to play the summer outdoor season with the Jacksonville Cyclones of the USISL Select League. In 1997, Vanacour returned to play for the Sandsharks. Vanacour spent the 1997–1998 season with the Cincinnati Silverbacks in the NPSL. In 1998, Vanacour split his time between the outdoor Arizona Sahuaros of the USISL D-3 Pro League and the Arizona Thunder of the Premier Soccer Alliance. He was All League with the Thunder. In 1999, he played for only the Thunder, now in the World Indoor Soccer League. In 2000, he again split his time between two teams, the Thunder, and the Tucson Fireballs. He was All League with the Thunder.

By the 2001 season with the Fireballs, Vanacour had entered the Sandra Day O'Connor College of Law at Arizona State University. He graduated in 2003 and began practicing law with Snell & Wilmer L.L.P. in Phoenix in October. In April 2010, Vanacour was hired as the general counsel for United States Youth Soccer Association. After leaving United States Youth Soccer, Vanacour was assistant general counsel for a large hedge fund based in Dallas until 2013. Vanacour then opened his own law firm, Vanacour Schuler Zarin, which then became Vanacour Perkins and founded North American Subrogation ("Subro Smart"), which he eventually sold his stake in. Currently, Vanacour continues to run his law firm, but is also General Counsel and managing director for the Americas for Phoenix Advisors, Ltd., an Abu Dhabi-based firm focused on litigation funding, asset recovery, and advisory services in the GCC, surrounding regions of South Asia and Africa, the Americas and Europe.
