= 1994 Fort Lauderdale Strikers season =

Fort Lauderdale Strikers
1994 season
- Owner: (United States) Amancio Suarez
- Manager: Thomas Rongen
- Stadium: Lockhart Stadium
- APSL: Fifth place
- APSL playoffs: did not qualify
Home colors	Away colors

The 1994 season was the fifth and final year that the Fort Lauderdale Strikers competed in the American Professional Soccer League (APSL). It was the club's twenty-eighth overall season in professional soccer. The Strikers finished fifth place in the regular season standings and failed to qualify for the playoffs.

Following the conclusion of the 1994 season, the Strikers ceased operations in the APSL. The club merged with the Fort Lauderdale Kicks, a team in the third-division United States Interregional Soccer League (USISL), and brought the Strikers name to them. The new Strikers team competed in the 1995 USISL Professional League.

== Background ==
The 1994 season for the Fort Lauderdale Strikers took place during a time of transition for American professional soccer. The American Professional Soccer League (APSL), in which the Strikers competed, had faced ongoing financial difficulties and instability. The Strikers had roots dating back to the North American Soccer League (NASL) and continued to play after the league folded in 1984. They joined the APSL in 1990, but the league itself had financial issues due to limited revenue streams, insufficient media coverage, and a dwindling number of teams.

== Season Stats ==
1994 Fort Lauderdale Strikers season Game Stats

Match	Opponent	Date	Goals Scored	Goals Conceded
1	San Diego Sockers	April 16, 1994	1	0
2	Atlanta Ruckus	April 23, 1994	2	4
3	Montreal Impact	April 30, 1994	1	2
4	New England Revolution	May 7, 1994	1	1
5	Seattle Sounders	May 15, 1994	0	3
6	Minnesota Strikers	May 21, 1994	0	4
7	Calgary Kickers	June 5, 1994	2	0
8	Atlanta Ruckus	June 11, 1994	1	3
9	San Diego Sockers	June 19, 1994	1	4
10	New England Revolution	June 25, 1994	1	2

== Competitions ==
=== APSL regular season ===
Place	Team	GP	W	L	WN	WE	WS	LN	LE	LS	GF	GA	GD	Points
1	Seattle Sounders	20	14	6	14	0	0	4	1	1	38	16	+22	121
2	Los Angeles Salsa	20	12	8	10	1	1	5	1	2	36	2	+14	106
3	Montreal Impact	20	12	8	10	0	2	7	0	1	27	18	+9	93
4	Colorado Foxes	20	12	8	9	1	2	8	0	0	26	26	+0	92
5	Fort Lauderdale Strikers	20	8	12	5	1	2	9	0	3	23	33	-10	72
6	Vancouver 86ers	20	7	13	6	0	1	11	1	1	25	41	-16	65
7	Toronto Rockets	20	5	15	5	0	0	15	0	0	14	33	-19	44

== Season Overview ==
=== 1994 APSL Points Table ===
Position	Team	Points	Matches Played	Wins	Draws	Losses	Goals For	Goals Against	Goal Difference
1	Seattle Sounders	121	20	14	1	5	38	16	+22
2	Los Angeles Salsa	107	20	12	3	5	36	22	+14
3	Colorado Foxes	93	20	12	2	6	26	26	0
4	Impact de Montréal	93	20	12	3	5	27	18	+9
5	Fort Lauderdale Strikers	73	20	8	5	7	23	33	-10
6	Vancouver 86ers	65	20	7	2	11	25	41	-16
7	Toronto Rockets	44	20	5	0	15	14	33	-19

=== Competitions Overview ===
Total Matches: 20

Wins: 6

Draws: 5

Losses: 9

Goals For: 23

Goals Against: 33

Goal Difference: -10

=== Transfers ===
==== Players In ====
Date	Player	From
01/01/1994	Peter Isaacs	Irapuato
01/01/1994	Lenin Steenkamp	—
01/01/1994	Robert Ukrop	Richmond
06/04/1994	Steve Trittschuh	Rowdies
01/05/1994	Jim St. Andre	Colorado Foxes
01/07/1994	Renato Corsi	Morón
01/07/1994	Paul Holocher	Admira
15/07/1994	Patrick Olalere	New Orleans
01/09/1994	Lenin Steenkamp	Vipers (Return from loan)

==== Players Out ====
Date	Player	To
12/12/1993	Thomas Rongen	Unknown
01/01/1994	Troy Edwards	Vipers
01/01/1994	Denis Hamlett	Anaheim Splash
17/08/1994	Chris Antonopoulos	Unknown

==== Players Loaned Out ====
Date	Player	To
01/07/1994	Lenin Steenkamp	Vipers (Loan)

==== Players Released ====
Date	Player	Status
01/01/1994	Shawn Medved	Free

==== Staff Changes ====
Date	Staff Member	Status
17/08/1994	Thomas Rongen	Unknown
