= Greg Veatch =

American soccer forward

Personal information
- Place of birth: United States
- Position: Forward

Team information
- Current team: Real Phoenix FC
- Number: 18

Senior career*
Years	Team	Apps	(Gls)
1989–1990	Arizona Condors		
1993	Arizona Cotton (indoor)	12	(15)
1994–1995	Arizona Sandsharks (indoor)	29	(5)
1995–1996	Kansas City Attack (indoor)	21	(2)
1996	Seattle Sounders	21	(2)
1998–1999	Arizona Sahuaros		
1999–2000	Arizona Thunder (indoor)		
2005–2009	Arizona Inferno		
2012–present	Real Phoenix FC (indoor)		
- * Club domestic league appearances and goals

Greg Veatch is an American soccer forward who has spent most of his career in indoor leagues. He also played one season each in the Western Soccer League and American Professional Soccer League.

Veatch began his career in 1989 with the Arizona Condors of the Western Soccer League. In 1990, the WSL merged with the American Soccer League to form the American Professional Soccer League. The Condors jumped to the APSL for the 1990 season, then folded. In 1993, Veatch played for the Arizona Cotton in the USISL indoor league. He then moved to the Arizona Sandsharks of the Continental Indoor Soccer League for the 1994 and 1995 indoor seasons. In the fall of 1995, he signed with the Kansas City Attack of the National Professional Soccer League. He only spent one season with the Attack before signing with the A-League Seattle Sounders on July 17, 1996. The Sounders won the A-League title that year and Veatch was released after the championship game. In 1998 and 1999, he played for the Arizona Sahuaros in the USISL. He jumped to the Arizona Thunder in the World Indoor Soccer League in August 1999. On August 4, 2000, the Thunder placed him on the injured reserve list. He played for the Arizona Inferno in the Premier Arena Soccer League until 2009. He left retirement in 2012 to play for Real Phoenix FC.
