= Kerlin =

Kerlin is both a given name and a surname. Notable people, and places with the name include:

- Kerlin Blaise (born 1974), American football player
- Frank Kerlin, Fianna Fáil politician
- Gerard Kerlin (1910–1946), Irish chess player
- Jacob Kerlin McKenty (1827–1866), American politician
- Mark Kerlin (born 1962), American soccer player
- Orie Kerlin (1891–1974), American baseball player
- Robert T. Kerlin, American educator and activist
- Scott Kerlin, American soccer player
- Kerlin Gallery, an Irish contemporary art dealer
