= Dale Ervine =

American soccer player & coach (born 1964)

Personal information
- Date of birth: May 19, 1964 (age 62)
- Place of birth: Belfast, Northern Ireland, United Kingdom
- Height: 6 ft 0 in (1.83 m)
- Position: Midfielder

College career
Years	Team	Apps	(Gls)
1982–1985	UCLA Bruins		

Senior career*
Years	Team	Apps	(Gls)
1986, 1989–1990	Los Angeles Heat		
1987–1994	Wichita Wings (indoor)	249	(305)
1991	Fort Lauderdale Strikers	8	(3)
1993	Los Angeles Salsa	18	(2)
1993	Los Angeles United (indoor)		
1994–1997	Anaheim Splash (indoor)		
1998–1999	Sacramento Knights (indoor)		

International career
1985–1993	United States	5	(0)

Managerial career
- 1997: Anaheim Splash
- * Club domestic league appearances and goals

Dale Ervine (born May 19, 1964, in Torrance, California) is a former U.S. soccer midfielder who spent most of his career playing indoor soccer. He also earned five caps with the U.S. national team between 1985 and 1993.

== College ==
After graduating from North Torrance High in 1982, Ervine received a scholarship to UCLA. He spent four seasons as a midfielder with the Bruins. In 1982, 1983 and 1985, he was the team's Offensive MVP. In 1985, his last year at UCLA, the Bruins won the NCAA Championship. Ervine was awarded the team's overall MVP for the season and was named a first team All American.

== Professional ==
In 1986, Ervine turned professional with the Los Angeles Heat of the Western Soccer Alliance (WSA). He did not play with the Heat in 1987 or 1988, but returned for the 1989 and 1990 seasons. The Heat went to the WSL semifinals in 1989. Between the 1989 and 1990 season, the WSL merged with the American Soccer League (ASL) to form the American Professional Soccer League (APSL). The Heat continued their success in 1990 and made it to the APSL title game before folding. The next year, Ervine moved to the Fort Lauderdale Strikers. He did not return to the outdoor game until 1993 when he was back in Los Angeles, this time with the Los Angeles Salsa of the APSL. The Salsa fell to the Colorado Foxes in the title game. In 1987, Ervine joined the Wichita Wings of Major Indoor Soccer League (MISL). He would remain with the Wings for the next seven seasons. In 1992 MISL folded and the Wings moved to the National Professional Soccer League (NPSL) where he played until the end of the 1993–1994 season. In 1993, Ervine signed with Los Angeles United of the new indoor league the Continental Indoor Soccer League (CISL). While an indoor league, the CISL played during the summer rather than the traditional winter season played by the MISL and NPSL. L.A. United was sold to new ownership in 1994 and moved to Anaheim, California where it was renamed the Anaheim Splash. Ervine remained with the renamed team until it folded at the end of the 1997 season. The CISL folded at the end of the 1997 season. Ervine ended his CISL career number eight on the goals, assists and points lists with 135, 114 and 249 respectively. In August 1998, Ervine signed with the Sacramento Knights of the Premier Soccer Alliance. The PSA became the World Indoor Soccer League in 1999. Ervine retired from playing after the 1999 season.

== National team ==
=== U-21 ===
In 1983, Ervine was on the roster of the U.S. U-20 national team which went 1-0-2 at the 1983 FIFA World Youth Championship.

=== Senior team ===
Ervine earned five caps with the U.S. national team between 1985 and 1993. His first cap came his junior year of college when he played in a 1–1 tie with Canada on April 4, 1985. He played again a year later as a substitute for Eric Eichmann in another tie, this time with Uruguay on February 7, 1986. He did not appear again for the national team until March 23, 1993, when he came on for Sadri Gjonbalaj in a tie with El Salvador. His last cap came two days later in a 4–1 loss to Honduras.

=== Futsal ===
In 1992, he earned nine caps, scoring eleven goals, with the U.S. National Futsal Team. That year, the U.S. took second in the FIFA Futsal World Championship. His eleven goals puts him second on the all time U.S. goals list.

== Coach ==
In 1997, in addition to playing with the Splash, Ervine also coached the team. The Splash ended the season at 16-12 and was eliminated by the Sacramento Knights in the second round of the playoffs.
