= Billy Crook (American soccer) =

American soccer player (born 1964)

Personal information
- Full name: Bill Crook
- Date of birth: April 3, 1964 (age 62)
- Place of birth: Kent, Washington, United States
- Height: 6 ft 0 in (1.83 m)
- Position: Defender

Senior career*
Years	Team	Apps	(Gls)
1982–1983	Seattle Sounders	13	(0)
1984	Minnesota Strikers (NASL)	20	(0)
1984–1985	Minnesota Strikers (MISL)	9	(0)
1985	San Jose Earthquakes		
1985–1992	Tacoma Stars (indoor)	240	(43)
1988	Seattle Storm		
1990	Portland Timbers		
1993	Portland Pride (indoor)		
1994–1996	Seattle Sounders		
1997	Seattle SeaDogs (indoor)		
1997–1998	Cleveland Crunch (indoor)	6	(2)
1998–1999	Portland Pythons (indoor)		

International career
1984	United States	1	(0)
- * Club domestic league appearances and goals

Billy Crook (born April 3, 1964) is a former U.S. soccer defender who spent two seasons in the North American Soccer League, eight in Major Indoor Soccer League, two in the Western Soccer Alliance, at least two in the Continental Indoor Soccer League, and four in the American Professional Soccer League. He also earned one cap with the U.S. national team. He currently coaches youth soccer in Sumner, Washington.

== Club career ==
Crook was born in Kent, Washington and has seven siblings, Charlie Crook, Ronald Crook, Robert Crook, Brent Crook, Jennette Crook, Joell Crook and Jody Crook. He attended Kent-Meridian High School, graduating in 1982. That year, the Seattle Sounders of the North American Soccer League (NASL) drafted Crook and he bypassed college to turn professional. Crook spent the 1982 season on the Sounders' reserve team before breaking into the first team in 1983. At the end of the season, the Sounders folded and Crook moved to the Minnesota Strikers. When the NASL collapsed at the end of the season, the Strikers moved to the Major Indoor Soccer League. Crook spent the 1984–1985 MISL season with the Strikers before moving to the San Jose Earthquakes for the 1985 Western Alliance Challenge Series. He then signed with the Tacoma Stars of MISL later that year. He would play the next seven seasons with the Stars. During those years, he did continued to play an occasional outdoor season, first with the Seattle Storm of the WSA in 1988, then the Portland Timbers of the American Professional Soccer League (APSL) in 1990. When the Stars folded following the 1991–1992 MISL season, Crook moved to the Portland Pride for the 1993 Continental Indoor Soccer League. In 1994, he returned to outdoor soccer when he signed with the reconstituted Seattle Sounders, now playing in the APSL. That season, he was a second team All Star. He spent three seasons with the Sounders as they won the 1995 and 1996 league championships. In May 1997, Crook returned to indoor soccer with the Seattle SeaDogs of the CISL. That year, the SeaDogs won the league title, then folded, along with the league. Crook moved to the Cleveland Crunch for the 1997–1998 National Professional Soccer League (NPSL) season. In 1998, several ex-CISL teams formed the Premier Soccer Alliance. Crook joined the Portland Pythons of the PSA for the 1998 season. In 1999, the PSA was replaced by the World Indoor Soccer League (WISL). Crook again spent the season with the Pythons, now playing in the WISL. In February 2000, the St. Louis Steamers of Major Indoor Soccer League acquired the rights to Crook, but then traded it back to the Pythons in April. However, the Python folded and Crook retired.

== International career ==
Crook earned one cap with the U.S. national team in a scoreless tie with Ecuador on November 30, 1984.

== Coaching career ==
Crook coaches youth soccer in Washington State for the new Seattle Sounders Academy.
