= Rob Baarts =

Canadian soccer player and coach (born 1969)

Personal information
- Full name: Robert Baarts
- Date of birth: February 19, 1969 (age 57)
- Place of birth: Surrey, British Columbia, Canada
- Height: 6 ft 0 in (1.83 m)
- Positions: Forward; defender

College career
Years	Team	Apps	(Gls)
1987–1990	Portland Pilots		

Senior career*
Years	Team	Apps	(Gls)
1989	Portland Timbers		(7)
1993–1997	Portland Pride (indoor)	126	(119)
1998–1999	Portland Pythons (indoor)		
2000	Utah Freezz (indoor)		
2001	Portland Timbers	0	(0)

Managerial career
- 1989–1990: Portland City United
- 1991–2003: Portland Metro
- 1995–2002: Sunset High School
- 2001–2015: F.C. Portland
- 2004–2015: Portland Pilots (men's & women's assistant)
- 2016–2017: San Jose State Spartans (women's assistant)
- 2018–: New Mexico State Aggies (women's)
- * Club domestic league appearances and goals

Robert Baarts (born February 19, 1969) is a Canadian retired soccer player who played as a forward. In January 2018, he was named head coach of the New Mexico State University women's soccer team.

== College ==
Rob Baarts grew up in Surrey, British Columbia and attended college at the University of Portland. He spent four seasons on the Pilot's soccer team under coach Clive Charles. When he finished his career at Portland, he had 29 goals and 14 assists. Baarts’ highlight with the Pilots came in 1988 when he, Scott Benedetti and Kasey Keller took Portland to the NCAA Final Four where they lost to eventual champions Indiana University.

== Professional ==
In 1989, he also spent the collegiate off season with the Portland Timbers of the Western Soccer League. He was tied for seventh on the league's scoring list with seven goals.

Baarts has also played professionally with the Portland Pride of the Continental Indoor Soccer League (CISL), as well as the Portland Pythons and the Utah Freezz, both of the World Indoor Soccer League (WISL). In 1995, he was a CISL All Star with the Pride. In 1997, the Edmonton Drillers of the National Professional Soccer League selected Baarts in the dispersal draft after the CISL collapsed. However, he did not sign with the Drillers. In 1998, he signed with the Portland Pythons of the Premier Soccer Alliance but he collided with Tatu during an early season game against the Dallas Sidekicks. The collision resulted in a season-ending injury. In the spring of 2000, the expansion St. Louis Steamers drafted Baarts, then traded him to the Utah Freezz in exchange for future considerations. He was the 2000 WISL Defensive Player of the Year. In 2001, Baarts joined the Portland Timbers of the USL First Division. However, he was injured after impressing the coaching staff during the pre-season. The Timbers released him before he played a game with them.

His coaching career began at the youth level with the Portland City United. Baarts coached the boys varsity team at Sunset High School in Beaverton, Ore., from 1991 to 2003. He was the league's coach of the year back-to-back seasons in 2001–02.

The active United States Soccer Federation member is an "A" license holder, and has coached multiple youth soccer age division for the FC Portland Academy since 2004.In 2009, Baarts guided both the men's and women's programs into the postseason, and the women's program advanced to the NCAA Quarterfinals for the fourth consecutive year.

As an assistant at University of Portland, Baarts was responsible for all recruiting activities, opponent preparation and team travel. In addition, the Portland men's and women's soccer programs have had a 96 percent graduation rate in the last seven years under Baarts' academic progress direction. More than a dozen Pilots which played under Baarts have gone on to play professional soccer. As an assistant, Baarts was responsible for all recruiting activities, opponent preparation and team travel. In addition, the Portland men's and women's soccer programs have had a 96 percent graduation rate in the last seven years under Baarts' academic progress direction. More than a dozen Pilots which played under Baarts have gone on to play professional soccer.

He became an assistant coach and recruiting coordinator at San Jose State in March 2016.

On January 5, 2018, he became the head coach for the women's soccer team at New Mexico State University.
