= Ralph Black (soccer) =

Scottish-American soccer player and coach (born 1963)

Personal information
- Date of birth: October 6, 1963 (age 63)
- Place of birth: Glasgow, Scotland
- Height: 5 ft 8 in (1.73 m)
- Position: Defender

Senior career*
| Years | Team | Apps | (Gls) |
| 1981–1982 | Denver Avalanche (indoor) | 40 | (6) |
| 1982–1984 | Baltimore Blast (indoor) | 22 | (0) |
| 1984–1989 | Tacoma Stars (indoor) | 210 | (45) |
| 1988 | San Jose Earthquakes | | |
| 1989 | Seattle Storm | | |
| 1989–1990 | San Diego Sockers (indoor) | 91 | (16) |
| 1990–1992 | Tacoma Stars (indoor) | 42 | (16) |
| 1992 | Tampa Bay Rowdies | 14 | (0) |
| 1992–1993 | Buffalo Blizzard (indoor) | 58 | (32) |
| 1993–1994 | Anaheim Splash (indoor) | | |
| 1995 | Seattle SeaDogs (indoor) | 15 | (11) |
| 1996–1997 | Portland Pride (indoor) | | |
| 1998–1999 | Portland Pythons (indoor) | | |

Managerial career
- 1997–1998: Portland Pythons
- * Club domestic league appearances and goals

Ralph Black (born October 6, 1963) is a Scottish-American retired soccer defender who spent most of his career in indoor soccer.

== Indoor soccer ==
=== MISL ===
Black began his career with the Denver Avalanche of Major Indoor Soccer League (MISL). The Avalanche folded at the end of 1981–1982 season. He then moved to the Baltimore Blast. However, in 1984, MISL granted a franchise in Washington State, known as the Tacoma Stars. Black established himself as a mainstay in the Stars defense. He spent at least the 1989–1990 season with the San Diego Sockers. However, he was back in Tacoma for the 1991–1992 season. The Stars and MISL folded in 1992. He finished his career in the MISL ranked sixth on the all time games played list with 442 games.

=== NPSL ===
After the MISL folded, Black moved to the Buffalo Blizzard of the National Professional Soccer League (NPSL) for two seasons, 1992–1994.

=== CISL ===
However, in 1993 Black moved back west to sign with the expansion Anaheim Splash of the newly established Continental Indoor Soccer League (CISL). In 1994, he was the CISL Defender of the Year as well as a member of the All-CISL First Team. In 1995, he moved back to Pacific Northwest to play for the Seattle SeaDogs. He was named to the 1995 CISL All Star game, but was unable to play due to an injury. However, in 1996, he moved to the Portland Pride. He played that and the 1997 season with the Pride.

=== PSA/WISL ===
At the end of the 1997 season, the CISL folded and the Pride, under new ownership, changed its name to the Portland Pythons. The Pythons then helped found the Premier Soccer Alliance (PSA). The PSA played one season, 1998, before changin its name to the World Indoor Soccer League (WISL). Black remained with the team through all these changes, becoming the Pythons’ head coach for 1998 and 1999. At the end of the 1999 season, the Pythons folded when a rumoured move to Tacoma, Washington fell through.

== Outdoor soccer ==
Black was on the roster of the San Jose Earthquakes of the Western Soccer League during the 1988 season. In 1992, between the folding of the Tacoma Stars and his arrival in Buffalo to play for the Blizzard, Black spent a season with the Tampa Bay Rowdies of the American Professional Soccer League (APSL).

== Coaching ==
After retiring as a player, Black went on to be head coach of the Portland Pythons. He then moved into youth coaching and is currently the Boys' Director of Coaching for the Seattle United soccer club.
