= Derick Brownell =

American soccer player (born 1974)

Personal information
- Date of birth: February 2, 1974 (age 52)
- Place of birth: Buffalo, New York, U.S.
- Height: 5 ft 10 in (1.78 m)
- Position: Defender

College career
Years	Team	Apps	(Gls)
1992–1995	Santa Clara Broncos		

Senior career*
Years	Team	Apps	(Gls)
1996	San Jose Clash	0	(0)
1996	→ California Jaguars (loan)	12	(1)
1997	Carolina Dynamo	1	(0)
1997–2000	Charleston Battery	33	(2)
2001	Tucson Fireballs	2	(0)
- Arizona Thunder (indoor)
- * Club domestic league appearances and goals

Derick Brownell is an American retired soccer defender who played professionally in the USISL and World Indoor Soccer League.

== Youth ==
Born in New York, Derick Brownell, grew up in Arizona, graduating from Brophy College Preparatory. After participating as a member of the 1990 Brophy team which finished runner-up in the Arizona state soccer final, Brownell attended Santa Clara University where he played on the men's soccer team from 1992 to 1995 and graduated with a bachelor's degree in economics. He is currently married to Megan Brownell and has two children.

== Professional ==
On March 4, 1996, the San Jose Clash selected Brownell in the second round (thirteenth overall) of the 1996 MLS College Draft. The Clash sent him on loan to the California Jaguars of the USISL for the entire season. He was selected to the USISL All Select Team with the Jaguars. When the Clash released Brownell at the end of the season, the Carolina Dynamo signed him for the 1997 USISL season, but released Brownell in May 1997. He then signed with the Charleston Battery where he played until 2000. Brownell also played for the Arizona Thunder in the World Indoor Soccer League.
