= Eddie Soto =

American soccer player (born 1972)

Personal information
- Full name: Edwin Soto
- Date of birth: June 14, 1972 (age 54)
- Place of birth: Artesia, California, U.S.
- Height: 5 ft 10 in (1.78 m)
- Position: Forward

College career
Years	Team	Apps	(Gls)
1991	Chapman Panthers		
1992–1994	Cal State Fullerton Titans		

Senior career*
Years	Team	Apps	(Gls)
1994	Montclair Standard Falcons		
1995	Los Angeles Salsa U-23		
1995	Los Angeles Salsa		
1997–2000	Orange County Zodiac		

International career
2006–2007	United States (beach)		

Managerial career
- 1997: Long Beach City College (assistant)
- 2001–2003: Cal State Fullerton (assistant)
- 2004–2005: Long Beach State (assistant)
- 2006: Cal State Fullerton (assistant)
- 2006–2013: UCLA Bruins (assistant)
- 2009–2020: United States (beach)
- 2014–2018: San Francisco Dons
- 2019–: Cal State Dominguez Hills Toros
- * Club domestic league appearances and goals

Eddie Soto (born June 14, 1972) is an American former soccer player who played as a forward. Soto spent five seasons in the USISL and has served as an assistant men's and women's collegiate soccer coach for eight seasons.

== Youth ==
Soto played for the North Huntington Beach youth club, winning the 1991 James McGuire Trophy as the U.S. U-19 national champion. He was also a member of the U-18 and U-20 national teams. In addition to his national team and club commitments, Soto attended Cerritos High School where he was a two time Parade Magazine high school All-American and the 1990 California 3A Player of the Year. Soto graduated from Cerritos in 1991 and entered Chapman University that fall. He played one season at Chapman before transferring to Cal State Fullerton where he played from 1992 to 1994. He scored thirty-eight goals in his three seasons, earning second team All-American recognition in 1992. His thirty-eight goals places him second on the school's career goals list. He graduated in 1995 with a bachelor's degree in kinesiology.

== Professional ==
In 1994, Soto spent the collegiate off-season playing for the Montclair Standard Falcons of the USISL. In the spring of 1995, Soto signed with the Anaheim Splash of the Continental Indoor Soccer League, but the team released him before he entered a game. In June 1995, Soto signed with the Los Angeles Salsa U-23 in the USISL. In February 1996, the MetroStars of Major League Soccer selected Soto in the eighth round (79th overall) of the Inaugural Player Draft. The team waived him on March 26, 1996. Soto returned to Southern California where he played for U.S. Beach Soccer and worked as a machinist. In 1997, he signed with the Orange County Zodiac of the USL A-League. In March 1998, the San Jose Clash selected Soto in the second round (23d overall) in the 1998 MLS Supplemental Draft. Once again, the team released him in the preseason. In 2000, the Zodiac was renamed the Wave. Soto left the Wave at the end of 2000 season and spent some time with the USA Pro Beach Soccer Team before retiring from playing.

== Coaching ==
In addition to playing, Soto also coached at the collegiate and youth soccer levels. In 1997, he was the assistant coach with the Long Beach City College women's soccer team when they won the California State Championship. In 2001, he was hired as an assistant coach at Cal State Fullerton. In 2004, he moved to Long Beach State as an assistant. On July 12, 2006, UCLA hired Soto as an assistant coach, but he also spent that season with Cal State Fullerton. On April 15, 2009, Soto also became the head coach of the United States national beach soccer team In 2012, the Los Angeles Galaxy hired Soto to coach its U-18 Academy team. In January 2013, Soto became the head of the U-15 team.
