= Mark Kerlin =

American professional soccer player (born 1962)

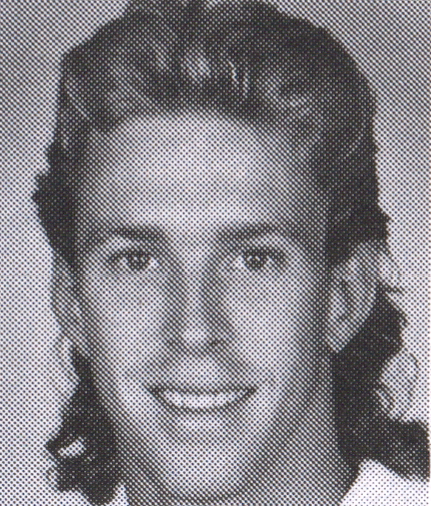
- Kerlin circa 1984

Personal information
- Date of birth: February 1, 1962 (age 64)
- Place of birth: Phoenix, Arizona, United States
- Height: 6 ft 2 in (1.88 m)
- Position: Forward

Senior career*
Years	Team	Apps	(Gls)
1981–1983	Phoenix Inferno (indoor)	59	(29)
1982–1983	Oklahoma City Slickers		
1983–1984	Phoenix Pride (indoor)	48	(32)
1984–1985	Dallas Sidekicks (indoor)	48	(25)
1985–1986	Baltimore Blast (indoor)	43	(12)
1986–1988	Wichita Wings (indoor)	102	(31)
1989–1990	Arizona Condors		
1989–1990	Tacoma Stars (indoor)	44	(13)
1991	San Francisco Bay Blackhawks	5	(0)
1992–1993	Cleveland Crunch (indoor)	12	(0)
1993	Arizona Sandsharks (indoor)		
1994–1995	Las Vegas Dustdevils (indoor)	45	(25)
1996–1997	Columbus Invaders (indoor)	26	(13)
1997	Arizona Sandsharks (indoor)	26	(31)
1998–2000	Arizona Thunder (indoor)		

Managerial career
- 2001: Arizona Heatwave
- * Club domestic league appearances and goals

Mark Kerlin (born February 1, 1962) is a retired U.S. soccer forward who spent most of his career in indoor leagues. He also played one season in the Western Soccer League and two in the American Professional Soccer League.

Kerlin, brother of Scott Kerlin, uncle of Drake Zane Kerlin, was born in Phoenix, Arizona, where he attended Moon Valley High School, graduating in 1980. In 1981, he signed with the Phoenix Inferno of the Major Indoor Soccer League (MISL). He played each of the last fourteen games of the 1981–1982 season, scoring ten goals. In 1982, he moved outdoors with the Oklahoma City Slickers of the American Soccer League. In 1983, the team changed its name to the Phoenix Pride. July 19, 1984, the expansion Dallas Sidekicks purchased Kerlin's contract from the Pride. He spent one season in Dallas before being traded to the Baltimore Blast on June 19, 1985. He spent one season in Baltimore before moving to the Wichita Wings in 1986. He played with the Wings for two seasons. In 1989, he signed with the Tacoma Stars. In 1989, Kerlin joined the Arizona Condors, an expansion team in the outdoor Western Soccer League (WSL). He was a first team All Star and one of the league's leading scorers. However, he broke his leg at some point in the fall of 1990 and missed the 1990–1991 indoor season. In 1990, the WSL merged with the American Soccer League to form the American Professional Soccer League (APSL) and Kerlin and his teammates made the move to the APSL for the 1990 season. The team folded at the end of the season and Kerlin played with the San Francisco Bay Blackhawks in 1991. In 1992, Kerlin was with the Cleveland Crunch of the National Professional Soccer League (NPSL). In 1993, the Continental Indoor Soccer League introduced summer indoor soccer. Rather than playing another outdoor season, he signed with the Arizona Sandsharks of the CISL. In 1994 and 1995, he played for the Las Vegas Dustdevils, winning the CISL championship in 1994. In 1996, he moved to the Columbus Invaders of the NPSL but was back with the Sandsharks in 1997. The Sandsharks ceased operations at the end of the season and in 1998, Kerlin joined the Arizona Thunder of the World Indoor Soccer League. He played through the 1999–2000 season.

Following his retirement from professional soccer, Kerlin coached the Arizona Heatwave in the United Soccer League W-League during the 2001 season.
