= Monterrey La Raza (1992–2001) =

Mexican indoor soccer club

- Full name: Monterrey La Raza
- Founded: 1992
- Dissolved: 2000
- Ground: Monterrey Tech Gym
- Capacity: 3,500
- League: Continental Indoor Soccer League; World Indoor Soccer League

The original Monterrey La Raza (Spanish: La Raza de Monterrey) was a professional indoor soccer team based in Monterrey, Nuevo León, Mexico. The team was founded on December 29, 1992, as a member of the Continental Indoor Soccer League. After the CISL folded, the La Raza took one season off and attempted to join the National Professional Soccer League before joining the World Indoor Soccer League in 1999. The team folded after it was expelled from the WISL before the 2001 season due to the lack of progress on building Arena Monterrey.

== Honors ==
Championships

- 1995 CISL: Monterrey defeated the Sacramento Knights 12–6, 4–5 (OT), 10–7 to win series 2–1.
- 1996 CISL: Monterrey defeated the Houston Hotshots 10–6, 6–5 to win series 2–1 in the minigames.
- 2000 WISL: Monterrey defeated the Dallas Sidekicks 6–5 in shootouts.

Division titles

- 1995 Eastern Division
- 1996 Eastern Division
- 1997 Eastern Division
- 2000 WISL Regular Season

== Year-by-year ==
League champions	Runners-Up	Division champions*	Playoff berth

Year	League	Reg. season	Playoffs	Avg. attendance
1993	CISL	4th 15–13	Semifinals	2,967
1994	CISL	2nd Eastern 17–11	Semifinals	3,374
1995	CISL	1st Eastern 23–5	Won Championship	3,137
1996	CISL	1st Eastern 18–10	Won Championship	2,447
1997	CISL	1st Eastern 20–8	Semifinals	2,684
1999	WISL	3rd WISL, 14–8	Semifinals	2,764
2000	WISL	1st WISL, 20–4	Won Championship	3,157

== Home arena ==
The Monterrey Tech Gym was the home turf for La Raza. It had a playing surface of 162 x 82.

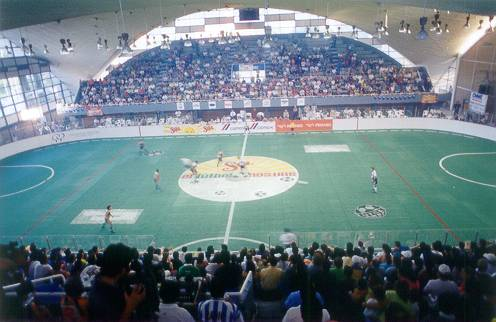
La Raza game at the Monterrey Tech in 2000 Season.

== Coach ==
- Erich Geyer 1993–1997, 1999–2000
