= Erich Geyer =

German footballer and manager

Personal information
- Date of birth: November 7, 1950 (age 75)
- Place of birth: Adelsdorf, West Germany
- Height: 6 ft 0 in (1.83 m)
- Positions: Forward; defender

Youth career
- Adelsdorf
- Büchenbach
- ASV Herzogenaurach

Senior career*
Years	Team	Apps	(Gls)
1973–1975	TSV Höchstadt		
1975–1976	1. FC Bamberg		
1976–1980	SpVgg Fürth	96	(11)
1980–1981	Hartford Hellions (indoor)	10	(0)
1981–1984	San Diego Sockers	57	(6)
1982–1983	San Diego Sockers (MISL)	39	(10)
1983–1984	San Diego Sockers (NASL indoor)	23	(8)
1984–1985	Chicago Sting (indoor)	17	(2)
1985	San Diego Sockers (MISL)	8	(0)

Managerial career
- 1984: San Diego Sockers (assistant)
- 1986–1988: Chicago Sting
- 1989–1992: San Diego Sockers (assistant)
- 1993–1997: Monterrey La Raza
- 1993–: Mexican Futsal
- 1999–2000: Monterrey La Raza
- 2002–2004: Harrisburg Heat
- 2004: Monterrey Fury
- 2004: Monterrey Tigres
- 2007–2009: Monterrey La Raza
- * Club domestic league appearances and goals

Erich Geyer (born November 7, 1950) is a German former football (soccer) defender who spent most of his career in the North American Soccer League and Major Indoor Soccer League. Following his retirement from playing, he coached for over twenty years.

== Player ==
Geyer graduated from the Hochschulinstitut fuer Leibesübungen in Erlangen, Germany. He then became a teacher and did not begin playing professional soccer until his early twenties when he signed with TSV Höchstadt. He played for Höchstadt from 1973 to 1975. After one season with 1. FC Bamberg in the Regionalliga, he moved to SpVgg Fürth in 1977. In 1980, he moved to the United States and joined the Hartford Hellions of the Major Indoor Soccer League. A forward in Germany, Geyer moved to defense in the U.S. After one season, he left the Hellions and signed with the San Diego Sockers of the North American Soccer League. He played four outdoor and one indoor NASL seasons with the Sockers. During the winter of 1982–83, the team competed in the MISL where it won the league championship. The Sockers then took the 1983–84 NASL indoor title before moving permanently to the MISL in the fall of 1984. However, the Sockers released Geyer during the preseason, and he signed as a free agent with the Chicago Sting in November 1984. On February 21, 1985, the Sting sold Geyer's contract back to the Sockers. The team released him again in June 1985.

== Coach ==
During the Sockers 1984 outdoor season, Geyer played only two games, spending most of the season as an assistant coach. He was named to succeed Willy Roy as Sting head coach on December 23, 1986. Geyer was fired by the Sting on February 22, 1988 and replaced by Gary Hindley. In 1989, he became an assistant coach with the San Diego Sockers, a position he held until the spring of 1992. In 1992, he became the head coach of the Monterrey La Raza of the Continental Indoor Soccer League. He was the 1995 CISL Coach of the Year. In 1993, he also became the head coach of the Mexican Futsal team. He left La Raza in 1997, then returned in 1999 as they played in the World Indoor Soccer League. In August 2002, the Harrisburg Heat announced they had hired Geyer to replace Richard Chinapoo. In March 2004, he became the head coach of the Monterrey Fury of the second Major Indoor Soccer League. When that team collapsed before the 2004–05 season, the Monterrey Tigres replaced it in the standings. Geyer became the head coach of the Tigres, but the league terminated the franchise after only a few games.

== Referee ==
After his retirement in 1985, Geyer became an MISL referee. He served in that capacity until hired as head coach of the Sting in 1986.
