= Randy Soderman =

American soccer player (born 1974)

Personal information
- Date of birth: May 1, 1974 (age 52)
- Place of birth: United States
- Height: 5 ft 11 in (1.80 m)
- Positions: Midfielder; defender

Youth career
- CISCO Soccer Club

College career
Years	Team	Apps	(Gls)
1992–1993	Glendale Gauchos		
1994	Grand Canyon Antelopes		

Senior career*
Years	Team	Apps	(Gls)
1992–1993	Arizona Cotton (indoor)		
1994	Arizona Cotton		
1995	Arizona Sandsharks (indoor)	26	(5)
1995–1996	Chicago Storm (indoor)	16	(3)
1996	Sacramento Knights (indoor)	13	(0)
1998–1999	Arizona Sahuaros	?	(9)
1998–2000	Arizona Thunder (indoor)	49	(31)
2000–2001	Tucson Fireballs	10	(1)
2004–2006	St. Louis Steamers (indoor)	66	(20)
2006–2008	Chicago Storm (indoor)	41	(14)
2007–2009	Arizona Sahuaros		
2012–2013	Real Phoenix FC (indoor)	10	(6)

Managerial career
- 2012: Tucson Extreme
- * Club domestic league appearances and goals

Randy Soderman (born May 1, 1974) is an American soccer player and technology entrepreneur.

== Early career ==
Randy Soderman, the younger brother of Rick Soderman, grew up playing for CISCO Soccer Club in Phoenix, Arizona.

In 1992, he graduated from Cactus High School. That year, he joined the Arizona Cotton for the 1992–93 USISL indoor season. Soderman attended Glendale Community College where he was a 1993 NJCAA Second Team All American.

In the summer of 1994, Soderman played outdoors with the Arizona Cotton. That fall, he entered Grand Canyon University, playing one season on the men's soccer team before declaring himself eligible for the CISL professional draft.

== Professional career ==
In 1995, he turned professional with the Arizona Sandsharks of the Continental Indoor Soccer League that was led by Ron Newman. That fall, he signed with the Chicago Power of the National Professional Soccer League.

In the summer of 1996, he decided against playing in Major League Soccer to continue indoor play with the Sacramento Knights of the CISL.

In 1998 and 1999, Soderman played for the Arizona Sahuaros of the USL D-3 Pro League, then returned to indoor summer soccer in 1999 with the Arizona Thunder of the World Indoor Soccer League where he won the WISL Defender of the Year award.

In 2000 and 2001, he was with the Tucson Fireballs in the USL D-3 Pro League.

In 2004, Soderman returned indoors with the St. Louis Steamers of the Major Indoor Soccer League. He played two season with the Steamers where he was voted to the MISL All-Star team in both years.

In 2006, the Milwaukee Wave selected Soderman as their first overall pick in the Dispersal Draft. That same year, Soderman was called up to the United States National Futsal Team.

On October 17, 2006, the Milwaukee Wave sent Soderman and Alen Osmanovic to the Chicago Storm in exchange for Anthony Maher and Tijani Ayegbusi.

The two seasons he spent with the Storm were the last two professional seasons Soderman played. Soderman retired from professional soccer in 2008 after the birth of his first daughter, Blakeley Soderman.

Since retiring for professional soccer in 2008, Soderman continue to play recreationally for many semi-pro teams. He returned to the Arizona Sahuaros, now playing in the National Premier Soccer League. In 2009, the Sahuaros played in the United States Adult Soccer Association.

On August 13, 2012, the Tucson Extreme of the Professional Arena Soccer League signed Soderman as head coach. I

On September of that year, the team announced it would delay its first season. Soderman instead, signed with Real Phoenix FC in the Professional Arena Soccer League.

Also, following retirement in 2008, Soderman entered into the technology industry where he founded Soderman Marketing & Xtraman Fundraising. In 2016, Soderman launched Elite Web Design of Phoenix as an extension of Soderman Marketing.

In 2016, Soderman co-founded and launched an auto glass software company called Glass Shop Go. In early 2018, Soderman was invited to join the Forbes Council.
