= Ken Hesse =

American soccer player

Personal information
- Full name: Kenneth Hesse
- Date of birth: February 3, 1972 (age 54)
- Place of birth: Denver, Colorado, U.S.
- Height: 6 ft 0 in (1.83 m)
- Position: Defender

Youth career
- 1990–1993: Cal State Fullerton

Senior career*
Years	Team	Apps	(Gls)
1994	Los Angeles Salsa		
1995	Colorado Foxes		
1996	MetroStars	1	(0)
1996	Anaheim Splash (indoor)	20	(2)
1998–2000	Orange County Zodiac	72	(5)
- * Club domestic league appearances and goals

Ken Hesse (born February 3, 1972) is an American retired soccer defender who played one game for the MetroStars in Major League Soccer.

Hesse attended Cal State Fullerton, playing soccer from 1990 to 1993. In 1994, he signed with the Los Angeles Salsa in the American Professional Soccer League. He moved to the Colorado Foxes for the 1995 APSL season. On March 4, 1996, the MetroStars selected Hesse in the second round (twelfth overall) of the 1996 MLS Supplemental Draft. He played the MetroStars first game, then was released. He then signed with the Anaheim Splash in the Continental Indoor Soccer League. In 1998, Hesse signed with the Orange County Zodiac in the USISL A-League. He played with the Zodiac through at least the 2000 season.
