= Kevin Smith (soccer) =

American soccer player

Personal information
- Position: Midfielder

Youth career
- 1989–1992: UC Irvine

Senior career*
Years	Team	Apps	(Gls)
1993	East Los Angeles Cobras		
1993–1994	Bournemouth FC		
1994	Los Angeles Salsa		

International career
1993	United States	1	(0)

Managerial career
- 2006–: Orange Coast College
- * Club domestic league appearances and goals

Kevin Smith was an American soccer player who earned one cap with the U.S. national team in 1993. He played professionally for two years then entered coaching. He is currently the head coach of the Orange Coast College women's soccer team.

== Club career ==
Smith attended UC Irvine where he played on the men's soccer team from 1989 to 1992. He ranks third on the school's career points list with 68. In 1993, Smith signed with the East Los Angeles Cobras of the USISL. In 1993, he moved to Bournemouth FC of the Wessex League. He was back in the United States in 1994 playing for the Los Angeles Salsa in the American Professional Soccer League.

== National team ==
Smith earned his one cap with the U.S. national team in an 8–1 win over the Cayman Islands on November 14, 1993. He came on for Mike Sorber at halftime.

== Coaching ==
Smith has spent most of his life as a teacher. Even while in college, he worked as a substitute teacher at Fountain Valley High School, a position he held until 1997. In 1991, he became the head coach of the boys’ soccer team. From 1992 to 1993, he worked as a coach in the Olympic Development Program. In 1993, he was an assistant at UC Irvine. In 1998, Smith moved from Fountain Valley to Cypress High School where he held a position as a full-time teacher and head coach of the boys soccer team. In 2006, he became the head coach of the Orange Coast College women's soccer team.
