= Veatch =

Veatch is a Scottish surname, a variant of Veitch. Notable people with the surname include:

- Dan Veatch (born 1965), American swimmer
- Greg Veatch, American soccer player
- Henry Babcock Veatch (1911–1999), American philosopher
- James C. Veatch (1819–1895), American lawyer, politician and Union Army general
- John Veatch (1808–1870), American scientist
- Laird Veatch, American collegiate athletic director
- Nathan Thomas Veatch (1886–1975), American engineer, co-founder of Black & Veatch
- Robert M. Veatch (1843–1925), American politician and businessperson
- Sarah Veatch, American biophysicist
