= Cactus High School =

High school in Glendale, Arizona

Location
- 6330 W. Greenway Road, Glendale, Arizona, United States; 33°37′36″N 112°11′44″W

Information
- Type: Public secondary
- Motto: Inherit the Tradition
- Established: 1977; 49 years ago
- Principal: Kristi Hammer
- Teaching staff: 53.18 (FTE)
- Enrollment: 1,036 (2024-2025)
- Student to teacher ratio: 19.48
- Colors: Columbia blue and silver
- Athletics conference: AIA 5A Conference
- Mascot: Cobra
- Rivals: Peoria High School
- Website: School website

Cactus High School is public secondary school located in Glendale, Arizona, United States, part of the Peoria Unified School District. The school opened its doors in August 1977. It is the district's smallest high school, with approximately 1,200 students.

In 1978, the first Cactus High School students, 1980 graduates, transferred from Peoria High School's campus during their sophomore year into the current building.

== Notable alumni ==
- Ryan Carpenter, MLB pitcher for the Detroit Tigers
- Khris Davis: didn't graduate, transferred to Deer Valley High School in 2004, professional baseball player, Oakland Athletics
- Kyle Kosier: Offensive lineman (NFL), free agent
- Brandon McDonald: Midfielder, Real Salt Lake (Major League Soccer)
- Jessica McDonald - professional soccer player. USWNT
- Zach Minter: defensive tackle (NFL), free agent
- Joe Riggs: professional mixed martial artist, WEC Middleweight Champion; formerly fighting for (Bellator) and Strikeforce; currently competing in the Ultimate Fighting Championship
- Tyler Schmitt - Professional longer snapper for Seattle Seahawks.
- Randy Soderman - professional soccer player
- Rick Soderman - professional soccer player
- Jason Vanacour - professional soccer player
