= Mike Ammann =

American soccer player (born 1971)

Personal information
- Date of birth: February 8, 1971 (age 55)
- Place of birth: Orange, California, United States
- Height: 6 ft 3 in (1.91 m)
- Position: Goalkeeper

Youth career
- 1990–1993: Cal State Fullerton Titans

Senior career*
Years	Team	Apps	(Gls)
1989	Los Angeles Heat	2	(0)
1993	East Los Angeles Cobras		
1994–1996	Charlton Athletic	34	(0)
1996–1998	Kansas City Wizards	60	(0)
1999–2000	MetroStars	46	(0)
2001	D.C. United	19	(0)
- * Club domestic league appearances and goals

Mike Ammann (born February 8, 1971) is an American former professional soccer player who played as a goalkeeper in England and Major League Soccer.

== Youth ==
Ammann was born in Orange, California. The younger brother of Bob Ammann, he played for the Los Angeles Heat in the Western Soccer League in 1989. In 1989, Ammann graduated from Mater Dei High School. He entered Cal State-Fullerton where he played on the men's soccer team from 1990 to 1993. In 1993, the Titans went to the NCAA Final Four. That year, he also played for the East Los Angeles Cobras in the USISL.

== Professional ==
After Mike Stevens, the director of Charlton Athletic, saw Ammann play in the 1994 NCAA Final Four, he offered him a trial. Ammann played for Charlton Athletic in the second tier of English football from 1994 to 1996.

When Major League Soccer started in 1996, Ammann was initially not signed, but late in the inaugural season he signed with the then-Kansas City Wiz. In 1997, he set a league record (since broken) of twenty-one wins, and ranked fourth in voting for the MLS Goalkeeper of the Year award. Before the 1999 season, Ammann was traded to the MetroStars with Mark Chung for Tony Meola and Alexi Lalas. That season the MetroStars squad finished with the worst record in league history. However, Ammann played well despite the lack of success, and was named Defensive Player of the Year two consecutive seasons. The 2000 season was Ammann's best as the Metros went through a rebirth. Ammann was selected to the 2000 MLS All Star game and started in goal for the Eastern Conference.

=== Injuries and retirement ===
Ammann missed the last five weeks of the 2000 MLS season after Mamadou Diallo collided with him in a game against the Tampa Bay Mutiny. Diallo stepped on Ammann, resulting in three broken three ribs, a punctured lung, and a concussion. The incident, which was dubbed "Crime of the Century" by Metro teammate Mike Petke, saw Diallo receive no punishment. Ammann missed the rest of the regular season because of these injuries, returning for the playoffs and shutting out the Chicago Fire 2–0.

With the emergence of Tim Howard for the MetroStars, Ammann was traded to D.C. United for Richie Williams and an allocation before the 2001 MLS season. Injuries dogged him, however, and he retired after not playing a minute in 2002. Ammann's doctor had never performed the procedure prior to operating on Ammann and left him permanently disabled. Ammann suffers disabilities in his right and left arms and hands. Dr. Hazel was found guilty by a jury of malpractice in D.C. Courts.

== Post-soccer career ==
Since 2003, Ammann worked in information technology and became the director of channel sales at Tintri. Ammann worked for Hitachi, ViON and EMC. In 2010, Ammann founded Twenty-Four Seven Goalkeeper, a goalkeeper academy in the Northern Virginia area, which taught both boys and girls of all ages. Ammann then merged 247GK with GK Icon and founded GK Icon USA some time before 2013. Ammann is currently the President of Purechannels, a global B2B Channel Marketing Agency. www.purechannels.com

== Honors ==
Individual

- MLS All-Star: 2000
