= Tucson Extreme =

American professional indoor soccer team

- Tucson Extreme logo
- Founded: 2012
- Dissolved: 2013
- Ground: Tucson Convention Center
- Coach: Randy Soderman
- League: Professional Arena Soccer League

The Tucson Extreme were an American professional indoor soccer team founded in 2012 with the intention of joining the Professional Arena Soccer League.

The Tucson Extreme was originally scheduled to begin play as a Southwestern Division team in the 2012–13 PASL season with home games at the Tucson Convention Center and Randy Soderman as head coach. They scheduled tryouts and advertised ticket sales but, in September 2012, delayed their launch by one year. The Extreme were then scheduled to play starting in the 2013–14 season but disbanded in early 2013.
