= The Maynard School =

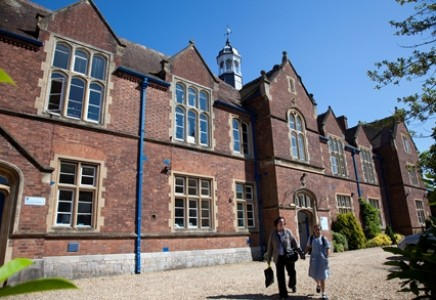

Location
- Denmark Road; Exeter, EX1 1SJ; England; 50°43′22″N 3°31′16″W

Information
- Type: Private day school
- Motto: Manus Justa Nardus (A just hand is a healing balm)
- Established: 1658; 368 years ago
- Founder: Sir John Maynard
- Local authority: Devon
- Department for Education URN: 113608 Tables
- Headmistress: Liz Gregory
- Gender: Girls
- Age: 4 to 18
- Enrolment: 370~
- Houses: Goldsmiths; Haberdashers; Armourers; Merchants
- Colours: Blue, Green
- Former pupils: Old Maynardians
- Website: http://www.maynard.co.uk

The Maynard School is a private selective day school for girls aged 4–18 in the city of Exeter in Devon. Founded in 1658, the school is the second oldest girls' school in the country, only predated by the Redmaids' High School in Bristol (1634).

== History ==
The Maynard School was founded by Sir John Maynard, a trustee of Elize Hele's charity, in 1658. Initially named the Blue Maid's Hospital, the school received extensive funding (alongside fellow beneficiary Hele's School) under the express condition that it be spent for "some godly purposes and charitable uses". Robert Vilvayne, a local landowner, further endowed the school by donating premises on Exe Island, while further significant donations were given to the school by Edmund Prideaux and Gilbert Keate. In the 1870s, on the basis of a recommendation from the Endowed Schools Commission, the school split in two. One became the Bishop Blackall Girls' Grammar School (which later merged with the Blue Maid's sister establishment Hele's School), while the second became Exeter High School for Girls. New premises were built in the suburb of St Leonards, and the school recommenced teaching in 1882. In 1912, shortly after its 250th anniversary, the school was renamed by headmistress E L Trenerry as The Maynard School for Girls.

During the blitz of 4 May 1942, three bombs fell on the school. Two hit the tennis courts – one demolished a wall and caused blast damage to windows and the roof, while the second severely damaged the boarding house and kitchen garden. The third bomb exploded in the front of the main building, severely damaging both the school and the houses on the nearby Barnfield Hill. The school was visited by King George VI following the destruction.

A large house called Leebourne on Spicer Road was destroyed in the bombing. It was home to nine year-old Fay Beauchamp, a pupil of the Maynard, and her parents. The raid killed Fay and her mother, Olive. The cellars of Leebourne were uncovered by workmen when the school sports hall, Bradley Hall, was built. The school field is now known as Leebourne after the house.

The current Headmistress is Liz Gregory, who took over from Sarah Dunn in September 2022.

== Academic environment ==
Although previously a boarding school, Maynard's now accepts only day students. Before World War 2, both boys and girls were welcomed in Y1 and Y2, although the Maynard now accepts girls only. Many of the original buildings constructed following the split with the Bishop Blackall School in the late nineteenth century remain largely unchanged, even in spite of the damage from the blitz. In addition to these buildings the school has expanded; creating indoor sports facilities, new tennis courts and libraries, a sixth form centre, an ICT facility (funded by the Wolfson Foundation) and most recently has updated the gym to create a Performing arts centre with an extension of a cardiovascular suite attached.

The school offers extra-curricular activities to its students; from team sports competing at the regional and national level, to language clubs and trips abroad. Girls take part in the Duke of Edinburgh Awards and participation in the annual Ten Tors hiking competition has been a particular staple in the school's history. Maynard teams have had Ten Tors success over the years, including being the first all-girls' teams back in 2005 and 2012.

== Academic standards ==
The school performs consistently well in UK school league tables, the 2016 results placed the school 16th in the country at GCSE in the Daily Telegraph Independent Schools League Tables. 2017 Department for Education League Tables ranked the school as the best independent school in Devon in key areas. In a recent ISI inspection, the school was rated excellent and its teaching staff were given the highest praise; the assessors noting that academic standards were above average even when compared to other selective schools.

In 2023, 74% achieved grades 9–7 in GCSE and 51% attained A*/A grades in A-level.

In 2025, the school received the distinction of ISI 'Significant Strength' award.

== Notable alumni ==
Alumnae are known as "Old Maynardians" and are members of the Old Maynardian Society.

- Gertrude Bacon, aeronautical balloonist and botanist
- Bridget Brereton, historian
- Jane Gibson, biochemist and professor at Cornell University
- Clare Morrall, novelist shortlisted for the Booker Prize
- Georgia Toffolo, television personality
- Margaret Turner-Warwick
- Violet Vanbrugh, actress
- Irene Vanbrugh, patron of the Royal Academy of Dramatic Art
- Mildred Veitch, businesswoman and horticulturalist
