= Michel Ndoumbé =

Cameroonian footballer

Personal information
- Date of birth: 1 February 1971 (age 55)
- Place of birth: Vienna, Austria
- Position: Defender

Senior career*
Years	Team	Apps	(Gls)
1986–1989	Diamant Yaoundé		
1990–1993	Union Douala		
1994	Los Angeles Salsa		
1994–1996	Újpest	16	
1996–1997	1. FC Košice		
1997	Orange County Zodiac		
1998–1999	San Diego Flash	47	(0)
2000	Orange County Waves	2	(0)

International career
1993–1995	Cameroon	3	(0)
- * Club domestic league appearances and goals

Michel Ndoumbé (born 1 February 1971) is a Cameroonian former professional footballer who played as a defender.
