= Arizona Sandsharks =

- Founded: 1992
- Ground: America West Arena; Phoenix, Arizona
- Capacity: 15,505
- League: Continental Indoor Soccer League

Arizona Sandsharks was a U.S. indoor soccer team that played in the Continental Indoor Soccer League (CISL). It was founded in 1992 and folded in 1997, along with the CISL.

== Club history ==
The Sandsharks were founded on August 3, 1992, under the ownership of Jerry Colangelo, owner of the NBA's Phoenix Suns, as a founding member of the Continental Indoor Soccer League. Unfortunately, the 'Sharks were unsuccessful on the turf as the club missed the playoffs in all four of its seasons in the CISL. At the box office, the 'Sharks record was mixed: they did manage higher-than-league average crowds at America West Arena in three of its four seasons, but still only drew 5,331 fans per match. (Summertime indoor soccer proved not to be very lucrative, as the CISL itself averaged only 5,464.)

In 1995, a brawl broke out at a game between the Sandsharks and the visiting Portland Pride, and Arizona's Franklin McIntosh continued the melee into the parking lot. When Colangelo attempted to break up the fight, McIntosh accidentally broke the owner’s nose. This proved to be the breaking point (literally) for Colangelo, who after years of financial losses sought to sell the team. Buyers were found in Kerry Dunne and Brian Weymouth, but the sale was completed just before the 1996 season, so the new owners chose to suspend operations for a year. After another awful season in 1997, though, the Sandsharks withdrew from the CISL; the club was then reorganized and renamed the Arizona Thunder, entering the Premier Soccer Alliance in 1998.

=== Year-by-year ===
Year	Record	Regular season	Playoffs	Avg. attendance
1993	6–22	6th	Did not qualify	5,316
1994	11–17	7th Western	Did not qualify	4,581
1995	11–17	4th Southern	Did not qualify	5,673
1997	8–20	5th Western	Did not qualify	6,153
Overall	36–76	–	–	5,331

=== Coaches ===
- Peter Duah 1993–1994
- Ron Newman 1995
- Luis Dabo & Petar Baralic 1997

== Notable players ==
- Randy Soderman
- Rick Soderman

== Honors ==
First team All Star

- 1994: Terry Woodberry
