= Jeff Betts =

American soccer player-coach

Personal information
- Date of birth: March 8, 1970 (age 56)
- Place of birth: Charles City, Iowa, United States
- Height: 5 ft 10 in (1.78 m)
- Position: Forward

College career
Years	Team	Apps	(Gls)
1988–1989	San Diego State Aztecs		
1991–1992	Portland Pilots		

Senior career*
Years	Team	Apps	(Gls)
1993	Fort Lauderdale Strikers	3	(0)
1993–1997	Portland Pride (indoor)	120	(139)
1993–1994	Milwaukee Wave (indoor)	26	(9)
1998–1999	Portland Pythons (indoor)	26	(35)
1998–1999	Florida ThunderCats (indoor)	17	(14)
2000–2001	Utah Freezz (indoor)	43	(29)
2002–2003	Dallas Sidekicks (indoor)	14	(4)

Managerial career
- 2000: Utah Freezz
- * Club domestic league appearances and goals

Jeff Betts (born March 8, 1970, in Charles City, Iowa) is an American former soccer forward and coach who spent most of his career playing indoor soccer. He was a three time All Star and the 2000 World Indoor Soccer League Coach of the Year.

== College ==
Betts began his collegiate soccer career at San Diego State University in 1988. In 1989, he led the team in scoring with 32 points on 10 goals and 12 assists. The 12 assists remains a San Diego single season record. He appears to have taken a year off from school before finishing his collegiate career with two seasons at the University of Portland in 1991 and 1992. He graduated in 1993.

== Professional ==
In 1993, he signed with the Fort Lauderdale Strikers in the American Professional Soccer League. He played three games before the Strikers waived him on June 18, 1993. He then signed with the Portland Pride of the Continental Indoor Soccer League (CISL). The CISL was a summer indoor league. That fall, he signed with the Milwaukee Wave of the National Professional Soccer League (NPSL) which played a winter indoor schedule. In 1994, he returned to the Pride and continued to play each summer with the team until the CISL collapsed following the 1997 season. His 139 goals put him sixth on the CISL's all time goals list and his 127 assists are fifth all time. In 1995, he scored 35 goals in 27 games, gaining him a place on the CISL All Star team. He was the All Star Game Offensive MVP. On February 7, 1996, the San Jose Clash selected Betts in the 7th round (68th overall) in the 1996 MLS Inaugural Player Draft. He did not sign with the Clash. Following the collapse of the CISL in 1997, several teams formed the Premier Soccer Alliance. With the new league, the Pride ownership chose to rename the team the Portland Pythons. This season, Betts scored 19 goals in 12 games and a spot on the All Star team. In 1998, Betts returned to the NPSL, this time with the Florida ThunderCats. In 1999, the PSA was renamed the World Indoor Soccer League. At some point, Betts may have also played for the Arizona Thunder. In 2000, he served as coach for the Utah Freezz as well as playing for the team. He was the 2000 WISL Coach of the Year. By the time the WISL ceased operations in 2001, Betts ranked third all time in WISL goals with 53 and sixth all time in assists with 39. The Freezz folded in 2001. On November 14, 2002, the Dallas Sidekicks of the Major Indoor Soccer League signed Betts. He played fourteen games, then left the team on February 6, 2003.
