= Octavio Zambrano =

Ecuadorian football coach (born 1958)

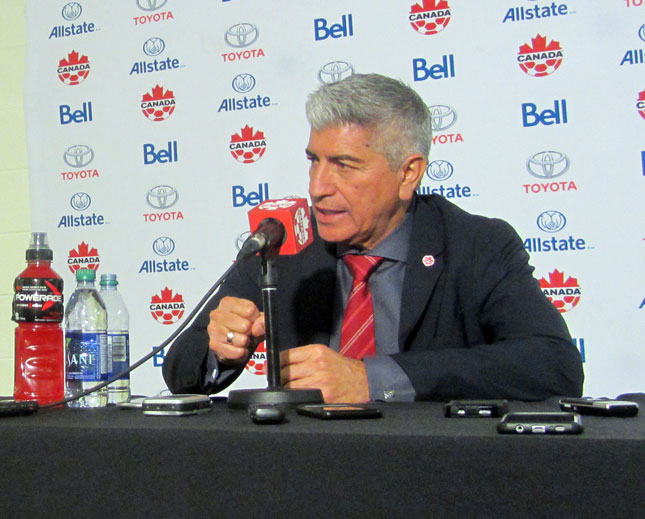
- Zambrano in 2017

Personal information
- Full name: Octavio Zambrano Viera
- Date of birth: 3 February 1958 (age 68)
- Place of birth: Guayaquil, Ecuador
- Position: Midfielder

College career
Years	Team	Apps	(Gls)
1980–1983	Chapman Panthers		

Senior career*
Years	Team	Apps	(Gls)
1979	Valdez		
1982–1983	Los Angeles Lazers (indoor)	17	(1)

Managerial career
- 1990: California Emperors (assistant)
- 1992–1993: Los Angeles Salsa (assistant)
- 1992–1994: East Los Angeles Cobras
- 1996–1997: Los Angeles Galaxy (assistant)
- 1997–1999: Los Angeles Galaxy
- 2000–2002: MetroStars
- 2006–2008: Tiligul-Tiras Tiraspol
- 2008–2009: Tatabánya
- 2009–2011: Sporting Kansas City (assistant)
- 2011–2013: Deportivo Pereira
- 2014–2015: El Nacional
- 2016: Delfín
- 2017–2018: Canada
- 2018–2019: Independiente Medellín
- 2019: Deportivo Pasto
- 2022–2023: FAS
- 2026: Monagas
- * Club domestic league appearances and goals

Octavio Zambrano Viera (born 3 February 1958) is an Ecuadorian football manager and former player who played as a midfielder.

Zambrano has coached in North America, Latin America, and Europe, and holds a UEFA "A" diploma and a USSF "A" coaching license. He was a successful coach in Major League Soccer during the late 1990s and early 2000s, with his 58.7% regular season winning record ranking second to Bruce Arena's 60.4%, according to the 2015 MLS facts and record book.

== Playing career ==
Zambrano was born in Guayaquil, Ecuador. He was an attacking midfielder and made his professional debut with Unión Deportiva Valdez of the Ecuadorian First Division. He moved to the United States from his native Ecuador in 1980 to attend Chapman University, and later played two seasons with the Los Angeles Lazers in the Major Indoor Soccer League.

== Coaching career ==
=== United States ===
In 1990, Zambrano was an assistant coach to Rildo Menezes (Ex-Santos of Brasil and New York Cosmos) with the California Emperors in the American Professional Soccer League. In 1992, he became both the assistant coach with the Los Angeles Salsa of the APSL and head coach of the East Los Angeles Cobras of USISL. He also coached the successful largely ethnic team from Southern California, LA Salsa U-19, a McGuire Cup finalist and was the 1994 USISL Western Division Coach of the Year. Following his work with the LA Salsa Zambrano was hired as director by the Mission Viejo Pateadores, one of the United States Top Soccer Academies.

He joined MLS as an assistant for Lothar Osiander with Los Angeles Galaxy reaching the MLS Cup final the first year of the league. Zambrano assumed head coaching duties when Osiander was fired early in the 1997 season. Zambrano's 1997 team went from last in the conference (3–9) to a record of 15–13, finished the season with 6 straight wins and made the playoffs. The 1998 Galaxy went 24 and 8 and broke all MLS scoring records, ending the year with 85 goals scored and a 2.66 goal per game average. The 1998 Galaxy became the first American professional soccer team to make it to a CONCACAF clubs final against Cruz Azul of Mexico. Zambrano coached the Western Division All Star Team and the Galaxy 97/98 achieved the record for most consecutive regular season wins (12). But in the playoffs they faltered, falling to expansion team Chicago Fire. Five games into the 1999 season, Zambrano was fired, the Galaxy made it to the MLS final the same year, losing against DC United.

Zambrano re-surfaced as the head coach of the MetroStars in 2000, replacing the much-traveled Bora Milutinović. He coached the team for three years. In 2000, he led the team from last in the East to first, winning the first trophy for the franchise, the MLS Eastern Division championship. For the first time, the MetroStars advanced the playoffs, defeating the Dallas Burn. Zambrano was fired after the 2002 season after failing to reach the playoffs.

From 2003 to 2006, Zambrano served a three-year term as elected Vice-President of FENODE (Ecuadorian/American Sports Federation).

=== Europe ===
In 2006, Zambrano was hired as the head coach for Tiligul-Tiras Tiraspol in Moldova. In 2008, after successfully taking Tiligul from the relegation zone to a fourth place overall, he left Tiligul and moved to Tatabánya in the Hungarian Soproni Liga. In 2009, he left Tatabanya.

=== Americas ===
Zambrano was hired by FIFA to write the CONCACAF Technical Report for the Gold Cup 2009. On 3 December 2009 Zambrano was hired by Kansas City Wizards now Sporting KC as assistant head coach, during his two-year term Sporting KC went from a non play-off team in five years, to the league semifinals and within one goal of the MLS 2011 final.

In January 2012, Zambrano was named head coach for Deportivo Pereira of the Colombian Categoría Primera B. Deportivo Pereira during the second semester of 2012 broke the record of points obtained in a single season by any Colombian professional soccer team since the installment of short tournaments. The team obtained 43 out 54 possible points, went unbeaten at home for 11 months and 20 days and was the highest scoring team in the league and the least scored against. During the first tournament of 2013, after a good start a string of injuries to main players coincided with a failure to secure a victory in four consecutive games and left the team out of the group of 8. In April 2013, the president and owner of Deportivo Pereira Alvaro Lopez Bedoya, opted to relieve Octavio Zambrano of his coaching duties and assigned him those of manager and technical director. Zambrano resigned his position in November 2013.

In June 2014, Zambrano became a TV game analyst for the Ecuadorian International Network Ecuavisa, as a member of Codigo Mundial, the highest-rated World Cup show in Ecuadorian TV; his participation in this show opened the door to take the reins of El Nacional, getting the club out of the relegation zone and into the group of 6, trying to secure a berth into Conmebol's International Tournaments: Copa Sudamericana and Copa Libertadores. In July 2015, Zambrano resigned from El Nacional.

=== Canada ===
In March 2017, it was announced that Zambrano would become the head coach of the Canadian men's national soccer team, replacing interim coach Michael Findlay.

Zambrano made his Canada debut with the under 23 team at the Aspire U-23 Tournament in Qatar, where the Canadians defeated Uzbekistan and Qatar to win the tournament. His debut with the senior team was in a friendly against Curaçao on 13 June in a 2–1 in Montreal before leading Canada to the quarter-finals of the 2017 CONCACAF Gold Cup a month later, Canada's first appearance in the knock-out stage of the Gold Cup since 2009.

On 8 January 2018, Zambrano was replaced as head coach of Canada by John Herdman, who had previously headed the Canadian women's program. He had lasted just nine months in charge of the program.

== Managerial statistics ==
Team	Nat	From	To	Record				
Team	Nat	From	To	G	W	D	L	%
FAS	El Salvador	2022	April 2023	29	11	9	9	0

== Honours ==
=== As a coach ===
FAS

- La Primera: Apertura 2022
