= Tyler Schmitt =

American football player (born 1986)

No. 48
- Position: Long snapper

Personal information
- Born: March 25, 1986 (age 40); Phoenix, Arizona, U.S.
- Listed height: 6 ft 2 in (1.88 m)
- Listed weight: 246 lb (112 kg)

Career information
- High school: Cactus (Glendale, Arizona)
- College: San Diego State (2004–2007)
- NFL draft: 2008: 6th round, 189th overall pick

Career history
- Seattle Seahawks (2008)
- Stats at Pro Football Reference

Tyler Schmitt (born March 25, 1986) is an American former professional football long snapper. He played college football at San Diego State University and was selected by the Seattle Seahawks in the sixth round of the 2008 NFL draft. He is considered the first pure long snapper to have been picked in the draft.

== Early life ==
Schmitt was born on March 25, 1986, in Phoenix, Arizona. He played high school football at Cactus High School in Glendale, Arizona.

== College career ==
He was the Aztecs long snapper for his four seasons at SDSU. He was also a possibility to play as a linebacker for depth purposes. Aztecs punter/holder, Michael Hughes, reported to NFL teams that Schmitt had never given a bad snap in his career.

== Professional career ==
Schmitt was selected by the Seattle Seahawks in the sixth round (189th overall) of the 2008 NFL draft. Schmitt became the first player to solely play long snapper to be selected in the NFL draft. He was placed on season-ending injured reserve with a back injury on August 26, 2008.

After missing his entire rookie season due to injury, Schmitt was released by the Seahawks on May 1, 2009. He never played in an NFL game.
