= Bob Ammann =

Swiss-American soccer player-coach

Personal information
- Date of birth: May 27, 1965 (age 61)
- Height: 1.97 m (6 ft 5 1/2 in)
- Position: Goalkeeper

Youth career
- 1983–1986: Cal State Fullerton Titans

Senior career*
Years	Team	Apps	(Gls)
1987	Autobahn		
1988	Los Angeles Heat		
1989	Edmonton Brick Men	26	(0)
1989–1990	Neuchatel Xamax		
- Brighton and Hove Albion
1993–1994	Los Angeles Salsa		

Managerial career
- 1995–2005: Cal State Fullerton Titans (assistant)
- 2006–2013: Cal State Fullerton Titans
- 2017–2019: Cal Poly Pomona Broncos (assistant)
- * Club domestic league appearances and goals

Bob "Bobby" Ammann (born May 27, 1965) is a retired Swiss-American soccer goalkeeper. Being a competitive NCAA Division I collegiate and professional athlete has helped Ammann develop a strong work ethic and competitive drive. Ammann's athletic experience as well as his social, business and institutional experiences has provided him a strong foundation to be an effective consultant for a wide spectrum of industries. He was previously the men's head soccer coach at Cal State Fullerton. He played professionally in the United States, Canada, Switzerland and England. He has worked in a number of capacities within the sport including product development, US Soccer as a coach and scout and Major League Soccer (MLS). Ammann has dual citizenship (Swiss and American) and is married with three children.

== Player ==
Ammann, older brother of Mike Ammann, graduated from Mater Dei High School. He attended Cal State Fullerton, playing on the men's soccer team from 1983 to 1986. In 1987, Ammann played for Autobahn Soccer Club. At the time, Justin Fashanu was in Los Angeles recuperating from an injured knee. While there, he worked out with Autobahn and spotted Ammann. In 1988, Fashanau became the head coach of the Los Angeles Heat in the Western Soccer Alliance. He signed Ammann who went on to earn second team All League honors that season. In 1989, Ammann moved to the Edmonton Brick Men of the Canadian Soccer League where he led the league in minutes played while helping them to the conference semi-finals. Ammann would be in goal when Edmonton beat Vancouver snapping the longest winning streak in North American Professional Sports. In the fall of 1989, Ammann became one of the first Americans to sign with a professional European club when he joined Neuchatel Xamax of the Swiss First Division in 1989 and 1990. He also had stints at Brighton and Hove Albion FC and Watford FC in England unfortunately cut short due to work permit issues. In the spring of 1993, the Los Angeles Salsa of the American Professional Soccer League made Ammann one of their first signings. A broken ulna prior to the start of the season minimized his contributions the first year. The Salsa would make the league final and participate in the CONCACAF Cup as one of the top teams in North America. Ammann played in goal in the team's first international match on foreign soil losing to Alianza of El Salvador 0–1 on a penalty kick in the round of 16. Ammann retired at the conclusion of the 1994 season after US Soccer denied the club permission to participate in the Mexican League. The club folded after its owner (Dr. William De La Pena) pulled his financial support and purchased Athletico Celaya of Mexico.

== Coach ==
After retiring, Ammann served as a full-time assistant coach with the Cal State Fullerton Titans. In spring 2006, he became head coach of the Titans. Ammann's coaching has included numerous youth clubs, Olympic development, collegiate and national teams. He is currently a youth national team scout working for US Soccer as well as a professional match evaluator for Major League Soccer. Ammann has helped develop numerous players who have gone on to professional careers as well as international recognition (Brian Dunseth, Joe DiGiamarino, Sheldon Thomas, Duncan Oughton, Mike Farfan and Gabriel Farfan). Ammann has also been instrumental administratively within the sport. He was the Big West Conference representative to the National Soccer Coaches Association of America and has served on numerous committees including the Farwest Rankings Committee. He has served as an NCAA representative at tournament games as well as spearheaded the implementation of rules to improve the college game. After a four-year stint away from the college game Ammann joined Cal Poly Pomona University in spring 2017 helping them lift West Region titles and appearances in the National Final Four in back-to-back seasons (2017 and 2018). The 2018 season also produced the university's first CCAA League championship. Ammann and the staff were voted by their peers as the "West Region Coaching Staff of the Year" in each of those seasons.

200
