= Iain Fraser (soccer) =

Canadian soccer player

Personal information
- Date of birth: April 3, 1964 (age 62)
- Place of birth: Jedburgh, Scotland, United Kingdom
- Height: 1.79 m (5 ft 10 1/2 in)
- Position: Defender

College career
Years	Team	Apps	(Gls)
1984–1986	Hartwick Hawks		

Senior career*
Years	Team	Apps	(Gls)
1986–1991	Kansas City Comets (indoor)	206	(19)
1987	Toronto Blizzard	8	(1)
1987-1988	Hamilton Steelers	24	(7)
1990–1991	Montreal Supra	36	(5)
1991–1992	Baltimore Blast (indoor)	40	(14)
1993–1994	Colorado Foxes		
1992–1995	Kansas City Attack (indoor)	97	(36)
1995	Sacramento Knights (indoor)	27	(15)
1996	New England Revolution	23	(0)
1997–2001	Sacramento Knights (indoor)	100	(19)
2001–2002	Baltimore Blast (indoor)	17	(4)

International career
1994–1997	Canada	30	(0)
- * Club domestic league appearances and goals

Iain Fraser (born April 3, 1964, in Jedburgh, Scotland) is a former Canadian professional soccer player.

Fraser is known as one of the first players drafted by Major League Soccer upon its creation, as well as the lead plaintiff in the lawsuit Fraser v. Major League Soccer against the league. The sporadic nature of professional soccer in the 1980s and 1990s in North America forced Fraser to become something of a journeyman, playing in numerous indoor and outdoor leagues.

== Club career ==
=== Early years ===
Although born in Jedburgh, Scotland, he grew up in Burlington, Ontario. Fraser attended Hartwick College in New York on a soccer scholarship. Graduating in 1986, Fraser played on three Division I NCAA tournament teams at Hartwick, playing in the Final Four in both 1984 and 1985. He was inducted into the Hartwick College Athletic Hall of Fame in 1997.

=== Indoor soccer ===
After graduating, Fraser was drafted in the second round by the Kansas City Comets of the original Major Indoor Soccer League. He would play for the indoor club for five years before joining the Baltimore Blast for the 1991/92 season. After the MISL folded, Fraser joined the Kansas City Attack of the indoor National Professional Soccer League in 1994. He stayed with Kansas City for three years despite interest from the rival Continental Indoor Soccer League.

=== Outdoor soccer ===
Due to the founding of the Canadian Soccer League in 1987, Fraser played indoor and outdoor soccer simultaneously, notably for Montreal Supra. This was common for many Canadian soccer players. In 1993 Fraser returned to outdoor soccer for two seasons with the Colorado Foxes of the American Professional Soccer League.

=== Major League Soccer ===
On February 7, 1996, Fraser was the fifth player selected overall in the 1996 MLS Inaugural Player Draft. Fraser spent only one season in the MLS, playing for the New England Revolution in their first-ever season. Although he missed the first few games due to injury, once he hit the field Fraser played every minute of every game after that, making his debut on June 6 in a loss to the LA Galaxy. Fraser recorded one assist during his time with the Revolution, on September 7, 1996 in a 2-0 win over the Dallas Burn. That year, the New England Revolution also featured midfielders Geoff Aunger and Mark Watson, both teammates of Fraser's from the Canada men's national soccer team. During his time in New England Fraser clashed with head coach Frank Stapleton, and ultimately requested a trade. On March 10, 1997, the Revolution placed Fraser on waivers.

Fraser is also known for his involvement in a 1997 antitrust lawsuit brought against Major League Soccer. The case alleged that the league's single entity structure, whereby all players are contracted to the league (and not to individual teams) was in fact an illegal monopoly. He was the first plaintiff listed in the lawsuit, leading the case to be known as Fraser vs Major League Soccer.

=== Sacramento Knights and retirement ===
He then joined the Sacramento Knights of the World Indoor Soccer League, where he was employed simultaneously as a player, Head Coach, and Director of Operations. Fraser is one of the few professionals to win honours both on-field and off-field in the same seasons, as he was both named defender of the year and coach of the year in 1999 and 2001. He stayed with the Knights until the WISL folded.

Fraser continues to be a top youth soccer coach in the Sacramento area for Folsom Lake Surf where he is also the Director of Coaching. Folsom Lake Surf is located in Folsom, CA.

== International career ==
He made his debut for Canada in a June 1994 friendly match against Morocco. He earned a total of 30 caps, scoring no goals. He has represented Canada in 10 FIFA World Cup qualification matches.

His final international was a November 1997 World Cup qualification match against Costa Rica, a game after which Randy Samuel, Alex Bunbury, Paul Dolan, Frank Yallop and Colin Miller also said farewell to the national team.

== Personal life ==
He is married to Dineen, has three children (Isabella, Dylan and Brandon) and makes his home in California, holding dual Canadian and American citizenship.
