= Mildred Veitch =

Anna Mildred Massyn Veitch B.A. (1 November 1889 – 19 March 1970) was a teacher and businesswoman, becoming the final member of the Veitch family of horticulturists to manage the family business of Veitch Nurseries.

== Early life and education ==
Mildred was the daughter of Peter Veitch and his wife, Harriett Drew.

Mildred was educated at The Maynard School in Exeter, remembered as a 'star pupil' who excelled in tennis, history, French and maths. In 1909, she won a place at St Hilda's College, Oxford to read history.

== Career ==
Following her degree, she taught history at Queen Margaret School, Scarborough, and Syndenham High School, before returning to the family business in Exeter 1919.

Following her father's death in 1929, she took over the family business although she retained the business name, "Robert Veitch and Son".

In 1931, she oversaw the nurseries moving from New North Road into larger premises in Alphington which were closer to another large site in Exminster. The interests in the High Street, Exeter were moved to Cathedral Close, and this shop and seed warehouse remained in business until the late 1960s.

The independence of the Veitch Nurseries ended in 1969 when Mildred was forced to sell the company to St Bridget Nurseries due to ill health, with no other family members remaining to take on the business. The business of Robert Veitch and Son Ltd was run separately for nearly twenty years, but Veitch's is now a subsidiary of St. Bridget and no longer trades under its own name.

Mildred is commemorated by a Camellia "Mildred Veitch".
