= Jorge Valenzuela =

Retired American goalkeeper

Personal information
- Full name: Jorge Valenzuela Jr.
- Date of birth: 1965 or 1966
- Place of birth: Denver, Colorado, United States
- Height: 5 ft 11 in (1.80 m)
- Position: Goalkeeper

Youth career
- 1983-1986: USC Upstate Spartans

Senior career*
Years	Team	Apps	(Gls)
1987–1989	Memphis Storm (indoor)	5	(22 saves)
1989–1990	Memphis Rogues (Indoor)	9	(70 saves)
1991–1992	Illinois Thunder (indoor)	16	(177 saves)
1992–1993	Canton Invaders (indoor)	23	(232 saves)
1992–1993	Denver Thunder (indoor)	7	(76 saves)
1992–1993	Fort Lauderdale Strikers	19	(? saves)
1993–1994	Harrisburg Heat (indoor)	26	(276 saves)
1994–1995	Anaheim Splash (indoor)	33	(460 saves)
Total		118	(1,313 saves)
- * Club domestic league appearances and goals

Jorge Valenzuela Jr. is a retired American soccer goalkeeper who played professionally in the United States during the late 1980s and 1990s. He competed outdoors in the American Professional Soccer League (APSL) with the Fort Lauderdale Strikers and had an extensive indoor career in the AISA, NPSL, and CISL, playing for clubs such as the Memphis Storm, Canton Invaders, Harrisburg Heat, and Anaheim Splash.

== Early life and youth career ==
Jorge Valenzuela Jr. was born in Denver, Colorado, and began playing soccer at a young age in the Aurora Soccer League. His father, Jorge Valenzuela Sr., was a nationally licensed soccer coach and a certified referee with the U.S. Soccer Federation. After the family moved to Carlsbad, New Mexico, Jorge Sr. was involved in the development of local youth soccer programs, and the family operated the Carlsbad Tortilla Factory, which sponsored regional youth teams including the under-19 Carlsbad Kickers.

During his youth, Jorge Jr., along with his brother Ricardo, participated in regional and national soccer training programs. Both were selected in 1982 for the Umbro American Select Squad, a group of U.S. players chosen to tour Wales and England. Jorge Jr. was also a member of the New Mexico Under-16 State Select Team and played as a guest for the Albuquerque Aztecs and University Sting of Las Cruces.

In addition to playing, Jorge Jr. obtained a Grade 1 referee certification through the U.S. Soccer Federation and earned a coaching license from the New Mexico State Youth Soccer Association. He competed in tournaments such as the Silver State Tournament in Reno, Nevada. He played for the local youth team "America," coached by his father where he helped lead the team to a runner-up finish in a regional tournament in Hobbs, New Mexico, scoring in the semifinal match.

He was a first team All-State, All-District, and All-Southern selection at Eldorado High School in Albuquerque. Following his high school career, he committed to play collegiate soccer for the University of South Carolina Upstate Spartans, then known as the University of South Carolina at Spartanburg.

== Playing career ==
=== College ===
Valenzuela played college soccer at USC-Upstate from 1983 to 1986. He earned NAIA All-America team 3 different times. As a four-year starter, he led the team to a 44-14-5 record. He holds school records for most wins (52), shutouts (28), and saves (393). His notable single-season statistics include a goals-against average (GAA) of 0.75 in 1984, 0.81 in 1986, and 155 saves in 1985, with a career GAA of 1.05. Under his tenure, the team made three consecutive appearances in the NAIA National Tournament, achieving third-place finishes in 1984 and 1985. Valenzuela was inducted into the USC Upstate Hall of Fame in 2007.

=== Outdoor ===
Fort Lauderdale Strikers (1992-1993)

Valenzuela played two seasons with the Fort Lauderdale Strikers in the American Professional Soccer League (APSL) he joined the team after recovering from surgery, initially training without a contract. In the 1992 season, he replaced longtime goalkeeper Arnie Mausser, Valenzuela had a 6–1 record including three games in the Professional Cup Series with one shutout and a goals against average of 0.75. During the 1993 season, he started all 19 games he played, recording 2 shutouts, and maintaining a goals-against average of 2.16.

=== Indoor ===
Memphis Storm (1987-1990)

Jorge Valenzuela became the first professional soccer player from both his hometown and the state, playing for the Memphis Storm (later called the Memphis Rogues) in the American Indoor Soccer Association (AISA). He was vital to the Storm's championship-winning season in 1987–88, Valenzuela helped the team to a 20–16 record.

Illinois Thunder (1992-1993)

In the 1991–92 season, Valenzuela appeared in 16 games and obtained nearly 200 saves for the Illinois Thunder of the National Professional Soccer League (NPSL). Thunder finished the regular season with a 20–20 record in the NPSL's National Division and qualified for the playoffs, where they posted a 1–2 record.

Harrisburg Heat (1993-1994)

Jorge Valenzuela Jr. later played as a goalkeeper for the Harrisburg Heat in the National Professional Soccer League (NPSL), which succeeded the American Indoor Soccer Association (AISA). On November 12, 1993, he recorded 20 saves in a 15–13 overtime loss to the Baltimore Spirit at the Farm Show Arena.

Denver Thunder (1992-1993)

During the 1992–93 season, Valenzuela played for the Denver Thunder in the National Professional Soccer League Indoor. The team finished the season with a 3–37 record in the NPSL's National Division. Valenzuela led the team with all three of its wins.

Canton Invaders (1992-1993)

In the 1992–93 NPSL season, Valenzuela appeared in 23 games for the Canton Invaders, who finished the season with a 13–27 record in the American Division. Valenzuela posted a goals-against average that was best among the team's qualifying goalkeepers during the season and recorded over 300 saves.

Anaheim Splash (1994-1995)

From 1994 to 1995, Valenzuela played for the Anaheim Splash in the Continental Indoor Soccer League (CISL). In 1995, he was named the CISL Goalkeeper of the Year with nearly 900 saves that season.

== Statistics ==
Indoor soccer

Over his indoor soccer career spanning from 1987 to 1995, Jorge Valenzuela appeared in 118 games across multiple teams in the American Indoor Soccer Association (AISA), National Professional Soccer League (NPSL), and Continental Indoor Soccer League (CISL). During this period, he played a total of 5,305 minutes, compiling a nearly even win-loss record of 44 wins and 45 losses.

Valenzuela conceded 628 goals with an overall save percentage of .574. His goals-against average (GAA) varied season to season, with performances including a 6.06 GAA with the Anaheim Splash in 1994 and a 7.49 GAA with the Harrisburg Heat in 1993–94. Over his career, he made 1,313 saves and recorded no shutouts.

Season	League	Team	GP	Min	W	L	GA	GAA	Shots	Saves	SV%
1987–88	AISA	Memphis Storm	2	85:39	1	0	8	5.58	48	19	.396
1988–89	AISA	Memphis Storm	3	10:00	0	0	1	6.00	4	3	.750
1989–90	AISA	Memphis Rogues	9	383:00	1	6	41	6.42	167	70	.419
1991–92	NPSL	Illinois Thunder	16	645:57	6	5	85	7.89	262	177	.676
1992–93	NPSL	Canton Invaders	23	871:24	3	12	111	7.65	343	232	.676
1992–93	NPSL	Denver Thunder	7	325:23	3	3	47	8.68	123	76	.618
1993–94	NPSL	Harrisburg Heat	26	1042:27	9	8	130	7.49	406	276	.680
1994	CISL	Anaheim Splash	23	1395:18	17	6	141	6.06	660	320	.485
1995	CISL	Anaheim Splash	9	546:27	4	5	64	7.03	276	140	.507
Total			118	5305:35	44	45	628	—	2,289	1,313	.574

Outdoor soccer

Jorge Valenzuela played for the Fort Lauderdale Strikers of the American Professional Soccer League (APSL) during the 1992 and 1993 seasons. Over two campaigns, he appeared in 23 matches, starting all of them, and compiled a career record of 10 wins and 13 losses with no ties. Valenzuela posted a goals against average (GAA) of 1.91 across 2,123 minutes played. In 1992, he achieved 0.75 GAA over four games, remaining undefeated, and in 1993 he played 19 games with a 2.15 GAA.

Year	League	Team	GP	GS	Min	W	L	GA	GAA	Shots	Saves	SV%
1992	APSL	Fort Lauderdale Strikers	4	4	361	4	0	3	0.75	3	?	-
1993	APSL	Fort Lauderdale Strikers	19	19	1762	6	13	42	2.15	42	?	-
Total			23	23	2123	10	13	45	1.91	45	?	-

== Honors ==
- New Mexico Under-16 State Select Team
- All-State, All-District, and All-Southern selection, Eldorado High School soccer
- 3x NAIA All-America team, USC-Upstate
- 1995 CISL Goalkeeper of the Year, Anaheim Splash
- 1988 AISA Championship, Memphis Storm.

== Personal life ==
After retiring from professional soccer in 1995, Valenzuela transitioned into business. He founded Speed Trainers USA and served as a Regional Director for Visalus Sciences. He practiced yoga before games and playing the saxophone to relax. Valenzuela resides in San Diego, California. His father, Jorge Valenzuela Sr., was a USSF referee and his brother, Ricardo Valenzuela, was a FIFA referee.
