= Anaheim Splash =

- Founded: 1994
- Dissolved: 1997
- Ground: Arrowhead Pond of Anaheim
- Capacity: 17,163
- League: Continental Indoor Soccer League

The Anaheim Splash was a U.S. indoor soccer team that played in the Continental Indoor Soccer League (CISL). It was founded in 1992 as the Los Angeles United, but was sold after the season. The new ownership moved the team to Anaheim, California and renamed it the Anaheim Splash. The team folded in 1997, along with the CISL.

== Los Angeles United ==
In the fall of 1992, Jerry Buss, owner of the Los Angeles Lakers, was instrumental in the founding of the CISL. On August 19, 1992, he was awarded a franchise named Los Angeles United. The team played in the Great Western Forum in Inglewood, California, which was also owned by Buss. The team went 6–22, drawing an average of less than 2,000 fans per game. At the end of the season, Buss sold the team to Ogden Facility Management.

== Ownership ==
- Jerry Buss (1993)
- Ogden Facility Management (1994–96)
- The Anaheim Splash, Inc. (1996–97)

== Staff ==
- (United States) Gary Sparks – Managing Partner (1996–97)
- (United States) Don Ebert – General Manager (1996)
- (United States) Tim Ryan – General Manager (1994–96)
- (United States) Steve Samaha – General Manager (1997)
- (United States) Tim Orchard – Co-Governor / Player Personnel Manager (1994–96)
- (United States) Brad Mayne = Co-Governor (1994–96)

=== Year-by-year ===
Year	Record	Regular season	Playoffs	Avg. attendance
1993	6–22	7th	Out of playoffs	1,913

=== Coach ===
- (United States) George Fernandez (1994–95)
- (Scotland) Ian Fulton (1996)
- (United States) Dale Ervine (1997)
- (United States) Mike Fox – Assistant Coach

== Anaheim Splash ==
When Ogden Facility Management purchased Los Angeles United, they moved the team to the Arrowhead Pond of Anaheim and renamed the team the Anaheim Splash to capitalize on the name of the team’s arena. The team saw an immediate turn around on the field, going 20–8 and losing to the Las Vegas Dustdevils in the playoff semifinals. In 1995, the CISL rearranged the teams, moving Anaheim to the Southern Division. Anaheim again won the division title before losing in the semifinals, this time to the Sacramento Knights. In 1996, the league began losing teams, leading to another readjustment of the teams, with the Splash returning to the Western Division, placing second in the division, but losing to the quarterfinals. In 1997, the Splash again finished second in the division, but lost in the second round to the Sacramento Knights. The CISL and Anaheim Splash both folded on December 23, 1997. During its four seasons in Anaheim, the Splash averaged 6,393 per game. The Splash also averaged 6,822 per game in the playoffs.

=== Year-by-year ===
Year	Record	Regular season	Playoffs	Avg. attendance
1994	20–8	1st Western	Semifinal	4,688
1995	17–11	1st Southern	Semifinal	8,429
1996	15–13	2nd Western	Quarterfinal	6,112
1997	16–12	2nd Western	Second round	6,343
4	68–44	–	–	6,393
with Los Angeles				
5	74–66	–	–	5,497

=== Honor ===
Coach of the Year

- 1994: George Fernandez

Defender of the Year

- 1994: Ralph Black

Goalkeeper of the Year

- 1995: Jorge Valenzuela

First Team All Star

- 1994: Ralph Black
- 1995: Sean Bowers

== Radio broadcasts ==
Joe Tutino called Splash games on KPLS radio in the 1994 and '95 seasons. Tutino, who was then a production assistant and update reader on "XTRA Sports 690," has gone on to a long career as the Los Angeles Galaxy's English-language announcer.
