= Denis Hamlett =

Costa Rican-American soccer player and coach (born 1969)

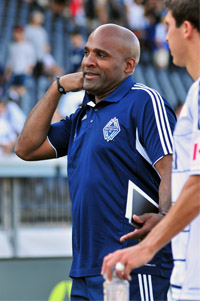
- Hamlett with Vancouver Whitecaps in 2011

Personal information
- Date of birth: January 9, 1969 (age 57)
- Place of birth: Puerto Limón, Costa Rica
- Height: 5 ft 10 in (1.78 m)
- Position: Center back

College career
Years	Team	Apps	(Gls)
1987	UNC Wilmington Seahawks		
1989–1991	George Mason Patriots		

Senior career*
Years	Team	Apps	(Gls)
1992–1993	Fort Lauderdale Strikers	19	(0)
1992–1994	Harrisburg Heat (indoor)	72	(24)
1994–1995	Anaheim Splash (indoor)	52	(26)
1996	Colorado Rapids	31	(0)
Total		174	(50)

Managerial career
- 1998–2007: Chicago Fire (assistant)
- 2008–2009: Chicago Fire
- 2010: Illinois Tech Scarlet Hawks (assistant)
- 2011: Vancouver Whitecaps (assistant)
- 2012–2013: Montreal Impact (assistant)
- 2015–2016: New York Red Bulls (assistant)
- 2017–2023: New York Red Bulls (sporting director)
- 2025–: Connecticut United (sporting director)
- * Club domestic league appearances and goals

Denis Hamlett (born January 9, 1969) is a Costa Rican-American former professional soccer player. He is currently the sporting director MLS Next Pro club Connecticut United FC.

Hamlett spent his entire professional career in the US, playing with the Fort Lauderdale Strikers and the Colorado Rapids, as well as indoor soccer with the Harrisburg Heat and Anaheim Splash. He has been a member of coaching staffs with Chicago Fire, Vancouver Whitecaps, Montreal Impact and New York Red Bulls, including a two-season stint as head coach in Chicago.

== Playing career ==
=== College ===
After his parents separated, Hamlett moved to the United States to live with his mother in Silver Spring, Maryland when he was ten years old, where he attended Albert Einstein High School. In 1987 Hamlett began playing college soccer for UNC Wilmington, before transferring to George Mason University in Fairfax, Virginia after his freshman season. He earned All-Colonial Athletic Association and All-Region accolades during his three seasons of play at George Mason. He graduated in 1992 with a bachelor's degree in public administration and was inducted into the school's Hall of Fame in 2006.

=== Professional ===
Hamlett began his professional career on June 10, 1992, when he signed with the Fort Lauderdale Strikers of American Professional Soccer League. He spent the 1992 and 1993 summers playing outdoor soccer with the Strikers. In the fall of 1992, he joined the Harrisburg Heat of the National Professional Soccer League. He spent two seasons with the Heat. Then from 1994 to 1995, he played summer indoor soccer for the Anaheim Splash of the CISL.

In 1996, Hamlett was drafted by the Colorado Rapids in the second round, 12th overall in Major League Soccer's inaugural draft. His stellar play continued with Colorado, where he won the BIC Tough Defender of the Year award. His playing career ended in 1997 when he suffered a stroke caused by a blood protein deficiency.

== Coaching career ==
Following his retirement from professional play in 1997, Hamlett attained his coaching license from U.S. Soccer. In 1998, Hamlett joined the coaching staff of the Chicago Fire.

He served as an assistant coach during the U.S. Project-40 squad's visit to Portugal, and continued his coaching duties with the Fire, becoming the senior assistant coach in 2001. Upon dismissal of former head coach Dave Sarachan, Hamlett received interim head coaching duties on June 20, 2007, but resumed assistant coaching duties following the arrival of Juan Carlos Osorio. When Osorio resigned take on the head coach job at the New York Red Bulls, Hamlett was hired as the head coach. Following Fire's failure to qualify for the 2009 MLS Cup, Hamlett was fired as head coach on 24 November 2009. Over his two-plus year tenure with the Fire, Hamlett helped the team to back-to-back Eastern Conference Finals, as well as the 2009 SuperLiga Final, going 24-18-21 in league play and 31-23-24 across all competitions.

Denis took up the post of interim coach of the men's soccer team at the Illinois Institute of Technology for the 2010 season, leading them to a conference title and playoff final appearance.

On January 8, 2011, it was announced that Hamlett had joined Vancouver Whitecaps FC in an assistant coaching role. On October 26, 2011, Vancouver announced that it had released Hamlett from his contract.

On January 7, 2012, the Montreal Impact announced that Hamlett was hired as an assistant to manager Jesse Marsch.

Hamlett again joined Marsch's staff with the New York Red Bulls beginning the 2015 season. Prior to the 2017 season, Hamlett moved to New York's front office to assume the role of sporting director.

On November 14, 2023, the Red Bulls fired Hamlett from the sporting director position along with not renewing head coach Troy Lesesne's contract.

Hamlett was appointed first-ever sporting director MLS Next Pro club Connecticut United in January 2025.
