= Utah Freezz =

- Full name: Utah Freezz
- Founded: 1999
- Dissolved: 2001
- Ground: E Center
- Capacity: 10,100
- Owner: Elmore Sports Group (Dave Elmore)
- League: WISL

The Utah Freezz were a professional American indoor soccer team based in Salt Lake City, Utah. The Freezz were a 1999 expansion team of the now-defunct World Indoor Soccer League. The team played in the E Center in West Valley City, Utah. Tim Mouser served as team president during its first two seasons and Chris Connolly was team president for the final season. The team was owned by the Elmore Sports Group.

Featuring a mix of local and professional talent under head coach Dave Poggi, the Freezz finished the 1999 season with a 12–10 record. Utah soccer fans embraced its newest sports franchise, helping the Freezz finished second in attendance with an average of 6,726 fans for thirteen home games. Freezz players Brian Alba, Beau Brown, and Justin Labrum received league recognition in 1999: Brown was named to the All-WISL Second Team while Brighton High School star Justin Labrum was named the 1999 WISL Rookie of the Year.

The team continued play until the WISL ended in 2001. During the Freezz's three years in the WISL, their average attendance was 5,748 per game.

== Year-by-year ==
Year	League	Reg. season	Playoffs	Avg. attendance
1999	WISL	4th WISL, 12–10	Lost Semifinals	6,726
2000	WISL	3rd WISL, 15–9	Lost Semifinals	4,775
2001	WISL	5th WISL, 10–14	Opted out of Playoffs	5,741

== Honors ==
Rookie of the Year
1999 — Justin Labrum
Coach of the Year
2000 — Jeff Betts
Defender Of The Year
2000 — Rob Baarts
