= Mike Fox (soccer) =

American soccer player (born 1961)

Personal information
- Full name: Michael Fox
- Date of birth: September 24, 1961 (age 65)
- Place of birth: Covina, California, United States
- Height: 5 ft 10 in (1.78 m)
- Position: Midfielder

College career
Years	Team	Apps	(Gls)
1979–1982	Cal State Fullerton Titans		

Senior career*
Years	Team	Apps	(Gls)
1983–1984	New York Cosmos	7	(0)
1984–1985	Las Vegas Americans (indoor)	41	(22)
1986	Los Angeles Heat		
1985–1990	Wichita Wings (indoor)	230	(78)
1990	California Emperors		
1991	St. Louis Storm (indoor)	18	(4)
1991–1992	Milwaukee Wave (indoor)	17	(7)
1993–1994	Wichita Wings (indoor)	7	(1)
1993–1994	Los Angeles Salsa		

International career
1984–1988	United States	16	(0)

Managerial career
- United F.C.
- * Club domestic league appearances and goals

Michael Fox (born September 24, 1961) is an American retired soccer midfielder. He began his professional career with the New York Cosmos in 1983 and ended it with the Los Angeles Salsa in 1994. In between those two teams, he played for numerous teams in multiple indoor and outdoor league. He also earned seventeen caps with the U.S. national team and was a member of the U.S. 1984 Olympic soccer team.

== College ==
Fox attended college at Cal State Fullerton where he played on the men's soccer team. He was a prolific scorer during his college career, netting 10 goals in 1980, 11 in 1981 and 17 in 1982. He also holds the school's season record for assists with 13 in 1980. In 1982, Fox was selected as a second team All American.

== Professional ==
The New York Cosmos of the American Soccer League selected Fox in the 1983 NASL College Draft. He played with the team from 1983 to 1984. Fox played one season with the Las Vegas Americans of the Major Indoor Soccer League from 1984 to 1985. He played seven games, scoring one goal with the Wichita Wings during the 1993-1994 National Professional Soccer League season. He played the 1986 Western Soccer Alliance season with the Los Angeles Heat. In August 1990, he signed a three-year contract with the California Emperors of the American Professional Soccer League. However, the Emperors folded at the end of the season. In February 1991, he signed with the St. Louis Storm. In October 1991, he moved to the Milwaukee Wave of the National Professional Soccer League. In January 1992, he suffered a season ending knee injury. He also spent two seasons, 1993 and 1994 with the Los Angeles Salsa of the American Professional Soccer League.

== National and Olympic teams ==
While playing for the Cosmos, Fox also played for the U.S. Olympic Team as it prepared for the 1984 Olympics. During those two years, he was the team's leading scorer. He played all three U.S. games at the 1984 Summer Olympics While the IOC allowed professionals at the 1984 Olympics, FIFA does not the games as full internationals. Therefore, these games and Fox's goals in them to not count as part of his stats with the national team. Fox earned seventeen caps with the national team between 1984 and 1988. His last official U.S. game was a scoreless tie with Ecuador on June 12, 1988.

Mike fox use to coach in southern California for a small Club named United F.C.. Mike Fox now lives just outside Denver in sunny Colorado, with his wife (Traci Fox), and youngest son (Nicholas Fox).

Mike Fox enjoys his favorite taco bell item, a Mexican pizza and is excited for their return.
