= Portland Pythons =

- Full name: Portland Pythons
- Founded: 1998
- Dissolved: 1999
- Stadium: Rose Garden Arena, Portland, Oregon
- Capacity: 18,500
- League: World Indoor Soccer League

Portland Pythons are a defunct indoor soccer team that played in the Premier Soccer Alliance (PSA) in 1998 which changed its name to the World Indoor Soccer League (WISL) in 1999. The team folded at the end of the 1999 season.

== History ==
In 1997, the Continental Indoor Soccer League (CISL) folded after five seasons. The CISL had been founded as a summer indoor soccer league in 1993. Although it had experienced some success in its early years, it barely made it through the 1997 season before folding. The Portland Pride was a charter member of the CISL and with the collapse of the league, the team’s ownership, Portland Professional Soccer, LLC, joined with several other CISL teams to form the Premier Soccer Alliance (PSA). With the new league came a new name as the Pride adopted the name Portland Pythons.

The Pythons performed poorly in the PSA’s first season. The team went 1–6 and failed to make the playoffs. At the end of the season, the PSA expanded into two new cities, but after a merger with the English Indoor Football League failed to materialize, the PSA renamed itself the World Indoor Soccer League (WISL).

The Pythons competed in the WISL in 1999, but folded at the end of the season after rumours of a move to Tacoma, Washington fell through.

== Arena ==
While the Pride had played in Memorial Coliseum, the Pythons held their home games in the Rose Garden Arena.

== Coach ==
- Ralph Black 1998–1999

== Year-by-year ==
Year	League	Record	Regular season	Playoffs	Attendance average
1998	PSA	1–6	4th	Did not qualify	5,210
1999	WISL	11–11	5th	Did not qualify	3,165
Total	WISL	12–17	–	–	3,603

== Honors ==
Goalkeeper of the Year

- 1999 Brett Phillips

First Team All PSA

- 1998 Jeff Betts, Billy Crook

First Team All WISL

- 1999 Brett Phillips
