= Tucson Fireballs =

Soccer club

Tucson Fireballs were a soccer club that competed in the United Soccer Leagues from 1997 to 2001. The club originally started as the Los Angeles Fireballs. They moved to Tucson, Arizona and became the Tucson Fireballs in 2000.

== Year-by-year ==
Year	Division	League	Reg. season	Playoffs	Open Cup
1997	3	USISL D-3 Pro League	9th, West	Did not qualify	Did not qualify
1998	3	USISL D-3 Pro League	4th, West	Division Semifinals	Did not qualify
1999	3	USL D-3 Pro League	7th, Western	Did not qualify	Did not qualify
2000	3	USL D-3 Pro League	3rd, Western	Did not qualify	Did not qualify
2001	3	USL D-3 Pro League	5th, Western	Did not qualify	Did not qualify

== Notable players ==
- Randy Soderman
- Rick Soderman
