= Scott Kerlin =

American soccer player

Personal information
- Place of birth: United States

Youth career
- Phoenix Inferno

Senior career*
Years	Team	Apps	(Gls)
1984	Phoenix Pride (indoor)		
1985	Dallas Americans		
1985–1986	Columbus Capitals (indoor)		
- Louisville Thunder (indoor)
- Fort Wayne Flames (indoor)
- * Club domestic league appearances and goals

Scott Kerlin is an American retired soccer player. Since retirement he has been actively involved in coaching. He has two daughters, Shaye and Racquel Kerlin. They both play collegiate soccer

Kerlin, brother of Mark Kerlin, spent several years in the Phoenix Inferno youth system. In 1985, he played for the Dallas Americans of the United Soccer League.

In July 1990, he founded the DFW Tornados.
