= Tim Orchard =

British physician, academic and NHS executive

Tim Orchard CBE
- Born: Timothy Robin Orchard
- Education: University of Cambridge
- Occupations: Physician, academic and NHS executive
- Known for: Gastroenterology and NHS leadership

Timothy Robin Orchard is a British physician, academic and National Health Service (NHS) executive. He is group chief executive of the North West London Acute Provider Group and professor of gastroenterology at Imperial College London. He previously served as chief executive of Imperial College Healthcare NHS Trust from 2018 to 2026. His clinical and academic work focuses on inflammatory bowel disease (IBD).

== Education and medical career ==
Orchard studied medicine at the University of Cambridge and completed clinical training at Charing Cross and Westminster Medical School. He subsequently undertook research at the University of Oxford. He joined St Mary's Hospital as a registrar in 2000 and became a consultant gastroenterologist. He was appointed professor of gastroenterology at Imperial College London in 2012.

== Clinical and academic work ==
Orchard's research and clinical practice concern Crohn's disease, ulcerative colitis and other aspects of inflammatory bowel disease, including its complications and treatment. He contributed to the British Society of Gastroenterology's 2011 guidance on the management of inflammatory bowel disease in adults and a 2016 European Crohn's and Colitis Organisation consensus on extraintestinal manifestations of IBD.

Orchard has also written on treatment guidance for Crohn's disease and on complications of inflammatory bowel disease outside the gastrointestinal tract. He has held professional roles within the British Society of Gastroenterology and the European Crohn's and Colitis Organisation.

== NHS leadership ==
Before becoming chief executive of Imperial College Healthcare NHS Trust in June 2018, Orchard held senior management roles at the Trust, including medical director and divisional director for medicine and integrated care. Writing in The BMJ in 2019, David Oliver identified Orchard among doctors holding chief executive posts at acute NHS trusts.

During the COVID-19 pandemic, Orchard commented publicly on hospital capacity, non-COVID treatment and workforce pressures. The Guardian reported on Imperial College Healthcare's preparations for a second wave in October 2020, while the Evening Standard covered his warnings about rising emergency demand and staff exhaustion in September 2021.

He also advocated redevelopment of St Mary's Hospital in Paddington, discussing the effect of ageing hospital buildings on healthcare delivery. BBC News reported on the hospital's condition and Orchard's case for rebuilding it in October 2024. In 2023 he became chair of the Shelford Group, a collaboration of NHS teaching and research trusts.

In April 2026, Orchard became group chief executive of the North West London Acute Provider Group, bringing together four NHS trusts under shared leadership. Health Service Journal reported on his appointment and subsequently covered his views on expectations placed on leaders of underperforming NHS organisations.

In May 2026, Orchard was ranked second in Health Service Journal's annual ranking of the most respected NHS trust chief executives, in the ranking's twelfth edition.

== Honours ==
Orchard was appointed CBE in the 2026 Birthday Honours for services to the NHS and healthcare research and innovation.

== Selected publications ==
- Mowat, C., et al. (2011). "Guidelines for the management of inflammatory bowel disease in adults". Gut, 60(5), 571–607. doi:10.1136/gut.2010.224154
- Harbord, M., et al. (2016). "The First European Evidence-based Consensus on Extra-intestinal Manifestations in Inflammatory Bowel Disease". Journal of Crohn's and Colitis, 10(3), 239–254. doi:10.1093/ecco-jcc/jjv213
- Orchard, T. (2010). "NICE guidance for anti-tumour necrosis factor therapy in Crohn's disease: what does it mean for the inflammatory bowel disease community?" Frontline Gastroenterology, 1(3), 144–146. doi:10.1136/fg.2010.001545
- Orchard, T. (2003). "Extraintestinal complications of inflammatory bowel disease". Current Gastroenterology Reports, 5(6), 512–517. doi:10.1007/s11894-003-0042-6
