= Rick Soderman =

American soccer player (born 1970)

Personal information
- Date of birth: April 4, 1970 (age 56)
- Place of birth: United States
- Height: 6 ft 2 in (1.88 m)
- Position: Forward

Youth career
- Glendale Community College

Senior career*
Years	Team	Apps	(Gls)
1993–1995	Arizona Sandsharks (indoor)	56	(34)
1995	Tucson Amigos (outdoor)	1	(1)
1995–1996	Chicago Storm (indoor)		
1996	Sacramento Knights (indoor)		
1997	Arizona Sandsharks (indoor)		
1998–2000	Arizona Thunder (indoor)		
2006–2010	Arizona Heat (indoor)		
- * Club domestic league appearances and goals

Rick Soderman (born April 4, 1970) is a retired American soccer forward who played professionally in the Continental Indoor Soccer League, National Professional Soccer League and World Indoor Soccer League.

In 1993, Soderman, older brother of Randy Soderman, signed with the Arizona Sandsharks of the Continental Indoor Soccer League. In the spring of 1995, he played outdoor for the Tucson Amigos of the USISL scoring the game-winning goal in overtime before rejoining the Sandsharks in mid-summer. In the fall of 1995, Soderman and his brother Randy both joined the Chicago Storm of the National Professional Soccer League. When the Sandsharks announced their intention to sit out the 1996 season, the Sacramento Knights drafted Rick Soderman in the April 1996 CISL draft. In 1997, Soderman returned to the Sandsharks. In 1998 through 2000, he played for the Arizona Thunder in the World Indoor Soccer League in which he was the leading scorer all 3 years. In 1999, he scored twenty goals in twenty-one games and was named to the All-Star Team. The Arizona Thunder folded in 2001 and Rick was drafted by the San Diego Sockers. At the height of his career finishing 3rd in the league in scoring and offered tryouts with numerous MLS teams, he decided to retire from Professional soccer to focus on his life after soccer. In 2001, he got a 2nd degree in Information Technology at Devry University and became a software engineer.

In 2006, Soderman joined the Arizona Heat of the Professional Arena Soccer League as a player/coach.

In the Fall of 2013, Soderman became head coach of the PASL-Premier semi-pro team Arizona Impact, leading them to a 5-2-1 record (two points back of the division title) in their inaugural season.

In the Summer of 2014, Soderman coached the semi-pro girls team, Impact FC, and won the National Championship in Las Vegas, Nevada.

Soderman now owns and runs multiple businesses including Soderman Marketing with his brother Randy which was started in 2012. He still continues to play soccer on a regular basis.
