= 2001 World Indoor Soccer League season =

2001 World Indoor Soccer League season provides an overview of the outcomes of the 2001 season for the World Indoor Soccer League. This was the league's final season, before it dissolved after some of its teams left for the Major Indoor Soccer League. The Dallas Sidekicks won their second title that year.

== League Standings ==
                          GP   W   L    PCT   GB     GF    GA  Home  Road
    
San Diego Sockers         24  14  10   .583  ----   133   114   8-4   6-6
Dallas Sidekicks          24  14  10   .583  ----   109   108   9-3   5–7
Sacramento Knights        24  11  13   .458   3.0   122   132   9-3  2–10
St. Louis Steamers        24  11  13   .458   3.0   123   125   7-5   4–8
Utah Freezz               24  10  14   .417   4.0   113   121   7-5   3–9

Playoffs
Semi-Finals               Dallas defeated Sacramento 2–1,5-4(OT)
                          San Diego defeated St. Louis 7–5,0-1,4-0
CHAMPIONSHIP:            Dallas defeated San Diego 6–3,3-5,2-1(OT)

=== Scoring leaders ===
GP = Games Played, G = Goals, A = Assists, Pts = Points

Player	Team	GP	G	A	Pts
Ato Leone	Sacramento Knights	24	25	17	42
Carlos Farias	San Diego Sockers	23	22	18	40
Tatu	Dallas Sidekicks	24	13	26	39
David Doyle	Dallas Sidekicks	24	22	14	36
Daryl Doran	St. Louis Steamers	24	24	11	35
Chris McDonald	Sacramento Knights	24	19	14	33
Justin Labrum	Utah Freezz	24	22	9	31
Mariano Bollella	San Diego Sockers	21	12	17	29
Jeff Betts	Utah Freezz	22	11	17	28

== League awards ==
Most Valuable Player: Ato Leone, Sacramento

Defender of the Year: Iain Fraser, Sacramento

Rookie of the Year: David Beltran, San Diego

Goalkeeper of the Year: Sagu, Dallas

Coach of the Year: Iain Fraser, Sacramento

== All-WISL Teams ==
First Team	Position	Second Team
Sagu, Dallas	G	D.J. Horvath, San Diego
Iain Fraser, Sacramento	D	Daryl Doran, St. Louis
Jeff Davis, St. Louis	D	Alejandro Cardenas, San Diego
Mariano Bollella, San Diego	M	Beau Brown, Utah
Ato Leone, Sacramento	F	Justin Labrum, Utah
Carlos Farias, San Diego	F	David Doyle, Dallas

https://www.indoorsoccerhall.com/awards
