= 2000 World Indoor Soccer League season =

Soccer season

== League Standings ==
                          GP   W   L    PCT   GB     GF    GA  Home  Road
    
Monterrey La Raza         24  20   4   .833  ----   167   126  12-0   8-4
Dallas Sidekicks          24  17   7   .708   3.0   153   107   9-3   8-4
Utah Freezz               24  15   9   .625   5.0   124   113  10-2   5-7
Houston Hotshots          24  10  14   .417  10.0   125   137   8-4  2-10
St. Louis Steamers        24   9  15   .375  11.0   125   137   5-7   4-8
Arizona Thunder           24   8  16   .333  12.0   105   118   5-7   3-9
Sacramento Knights        24   5  19   .208  15.0    94   155   4-8  1-11

Playoffs
Quarter-Finals:          Utah defeated Arizona 9-3           
                          St. Louis defeated Houston 5-3
Semi-Finals               Dallas defeated Utah 7-4
                          Monterrey defeated St. Louis 7-3
CHAMPIONSHIP:            Monterrey defeated Dallas 6-5(SO)

=== Scoring leaders ===
GP = Games Played, G = Goals, A = Assists, Pts = Points

Player	Team	GP	G	A	Pts
Marco Lopez	Monterrey La Raza	23	20	31	51
Tatu	Dallas Sidekicks	24	18	33	51
Mariano Bollella	Monterrey La Raza	23	27	22	49
Ato Leone	Houston Hotshots	24	25	21	46
Clint Regier	Houston Hotshots	24	31	13	44
David Doyle	Dallas Sidekicks	23	26	18	44
Marco Coria	Monterrey La Raza	21	27	16	43
Beau Brown	Utah Freezz	24	26	15	41
Renato Pereira	Monterrey La Raza	24	25	11	36
Jeff Betts	Utah Freezz	21	18	17	35

== League awards ==
Most Valuable Player: Mariano Bollella, Monterrey

Defender of the Year: Rob Baarts, Utah

Rookie of the Year: Clint Regier, Houston

Goalkeeper of the Year: Sagu, Dallas

Coach of the Year: Jeff Betts, Utah

== All-WISL Teams ==
First Team	Position	Second Team
Sagu, Dallas	G	Juan De La O, Arizona
Kiley Couch, Houston	D	Jeff Davis, St. Louis
Jason Vanacour, Arizona	D	Genoni Martinez, Monterrey
Mariano Bollella, Monterrey	M	Nick Stavrou, Dallas
Tatu, Dallas	F	Marco Lopez, Monterrey
David Doyle, Dallas	F	Beau Brown, Utah

https://www.indoorsoccerhall.com/awards
