= Los Angeles Salsa =

Defunct American soccer club

- Full name: Los Angeles Salsa Professional Soccer Club
- Nickname(s): LA Salsa
- Founded: 1992
- Dissolved: 1995
- Stadium: Titan Stadium; Fullerton, California
- Capacity: 10,000
- Owner: William De La Pena
- General Manager: Rick Davis
- Coach: Rildo da Costa Menezes (1993); Rick Davis (1994–1995)
- League: American Professional Soccer League
- 1994 APSL: 2nd

The Los Angeles Salsa was an American soccer team based in Los Angeles that played in the American Professional Soccer League (APSL) and the USISL Pro League. The club played on the campus of California State University, Fullerton at Titan Stadium in Orange County, California, from 1993 to 1994. They also played home games at Weingart Stadium on the campus of East Los Angeles College in Monterey Park, California, in 1994 and various high schools in 1995.

The club, founded in 1992, was owned by ophthalmologist William De La Pena and entered the APSL in 1993 as an expansion team. They hosted the APSL Championship, which they lost to the Colorado Foxes; the Salsa played in the 1994 CONCACAF Champions' Cup and were eliminated in the second round. The team left the APSL in January 1995 after plans to play in Mexico's Primera División A fell apart due to opposition from CONCACAF. The Salsa played for one season in the USISL Pro League before folding in 1996.

== History ==
=== Founding and APSL seasons ===
The Salsa was founded in 1992 by ophthalmologist William De La Pena and joined the APSL the following year as an expansion team. The league's previous team in the area, the Los Angeles Heat, had joined in 1990 and folded after the end of the season. Rick Davis, a former New York Cosmos player and television broadcaster, was named general manager; former Brazil national team member Rildo da Costa Menezes was hired as head coach. The club also partnered with the existing East Los Angeles Cobras, who became their under-23 reserve squad, and held an open tryout in December 1992. Forward Harut Karapetyan was the only player chosen out of 1,000 entrants.

The team finished fourth in their inaugural APSL season with 109 points after losing eight of their final matches. They drew an average attendance of over 4,000 during their 12 home matches at Titan Stadium. Forward Paulinho led the league in scoring with 15 goals and was named the most valuable player; his teammate Paul Wright was second in scoring with 13 goals. The Salsa won their playoffs semifinal against the Vancouver 86ers in a penalty shootout following a 2–2 draw. Paulinho had scored from a free kick in the third minute of stoppage time to force extra time and the shootout, which ended 3–1 for Los Angeles. The Salsa hosted the Colorado Foxes in the APSL Championship at Titan Stadium and lost 3–1 in extra time. Following the controversial substitution of Paulinho, the visitors scored twice in extra time to clinch their second consecutive league championship.

Rildo Menezes resigned as head coach following the 1993 season and was replaced in January 1994 by Rick Davis, who would also remain as general manager. Octavio Zambrano was also hired as assistant coach after a stint as the Cobras head coach and interim manager of the Salsa. The team competed in the 1994 CONCACAF Champions' Cup as the U.S. representative in place of the Colorado Foxes, who declined to use their berth. They played El Salvadorian club Alianza F.C. and lost 1–0 in the first leg, which was played in San Salvador and was decided by a penalty kick. The Salsa hosted the second leg at Titan Stadium and took a 2–1 lead at halftime to tie the series on aggregate score. The hosts then earned three red cards between the 53rd and 70th minutes, leaving Los Angeles with eight players. The Salsa conceded a match-tying goal to Alianza and drew 2–2; Alianza advanced with a 3–2 aggregate score.

The Salsa resumed APSL play in July 1994 with most of their 1993 lineup and added U.S. defender Jeff Agoos and Cameroonian defender Michel Ndoumbé during the offseason. Their season opener at Titan Stadium against the expansion Seattle Sounders drew an attendance of 2,148. The Salsa's third match of the season, a 3–0 win against the Houston Force on July 14, was later voided due to Houston's expulsion from the APSL. The nine points they earned from the match were lost and dropped the team from first in the league standings to third. Los Angeles finished the regular season with a 12–8 record, tied with the Montreal Impact and Colorado, but placed second in the league with 109 points. Wright and Paulinho were tied atop the scoring leaderboard with 27 points, with the former winning the title due to his 12 goals to Paulinho's 11. Paulinho earned his second most valuable player title.

Los Angeles played in a best-of-three series in the playoffs semifinals against Montreal, who they were winless against in three regular season matches. The first leg at Complexe sportif Claude-Robillard in Montreal ended in a 2–1 win for the hosts following a pair of red cards for defenders on both teams. The Impact took an early 2–0 lead that was reduced following a penalty kick for the Salsa in the 32nd minute that was converted by Paulinho; a penalty awarded to the Impact in the 81st minute was missed by Jean Harbor. The Salsa rallied to win 3–0 in the second leg at Titan Stadium with a first-half strike from Thor Lee and two goals by Paulinho in the final twelve minutes. The victory was followed by a 30-minute third leg that was played later that day, which ended scoreless and forced a penalty shootout, which the Impact won 2–1 in seven rounds. Goalkeeper Pat Harrington made three saves in the shootout for Montreal, while Patrick Diotte scored the winning penalty in sudden death.

=== Mexican league and USISL stint ===
On June 26, 1994, the United States Soccer Federation (USSF) permitted the Salsa to compete in Mexico's Primera División A, the second-highest tier of soccer in the country. A similar proposal had been rejected in June 1993; the team had been approached by the Mexican Football Federation and league representatives to play in the reformed league following the Salsa's victories in friendlies against Mexican clubs as well as the national teams of South Korea and Cameroon ahead of the 1994 FIFA World Cup. The decision was split among board members, with USSF president Alan Rothenberg among the votes in opposition. De La Pena also stated that he had entered discussions with Major League Soccer to join the new top-level league, but was at odds with the new league's single-entity structure that did not allow for independent ownership.

In August, FIFA began reviewing the cross-border play proposal after CONCACAF raised concerns about potential conflicts with existing statutes that govern leagues and national competitions. FIFA general secretary Sepp Blatter announced that the move was approved in October despite CONCACAF's opposition, but only for a single year; the announcement was made several weeks after the league's season began. The Salsa had already scheduled a series of 19 weekly exhibition matches against teams from the Primera División de México that began on October 29, 1994, and was scheduled to last until April 1995. A second team was fielded to allow the club to play year-round in both the APSL in summer and against Mexican opponents during the winter and spring. The first match, against C.D. Guadalajara (Chivas), drew 14,000 fans to Weingart Stadium and was followed by two more matches at the same stadium. The series was postponed in November due to a Mexican Football Federation boycott against California Proposition 187, which would ban some state-provided education and medical benefits from serving undocumented immigrants.

The Salsa withdrew from the 1995 APSL season on January 13, 1995, following a failed attempt to merge operations with the Vancouver 86ers. Davis, in his capacity as general manager, announced that the team would continue to seek entry into the Mexican league system or return to the APSL by 1996. The team retained their staff but lost several players to other leagues as it dropped to the USISL Pro League, the third division of American soccer, in April 1995 to replace the Cobras' slot. They also announced that their home matches would be played at local high schools instead of Titan Stadium with the World Cup Training Center in Mission Viejo as its main base.

The third-division Salsa signed veteran U.S. national team defender Paul Caligiuri, who announced that he would donate his salary to victims of the Oklahoma City bombing. The team made their home USISL debut on May 7, 1995, at Trabuco Hills High School, where they lost 5–3 to the San Fernando Valley Golden Eagles in front of 900 spectators. The Salsa finished atop the South Conference of the league's Western Division with a 16–5 record and 137 points to qualify for the regional playoffs. They defeated the San Diego Top Guns 5–1 to advance to the USISL Western Division championship, where they played in a home-and-home series against the Monterey Bay Jaguars, the North Conference winners. The Jaguars trailed 1–0 at halftime but came from behind with three goals in the final 13 minutes to win 3–2 during the first leg at Mission Viejo High School. The Salsa lost the second leg 2–1 in overtime from a breakaway shootout goal awarded for accumulated fouls.

The Salsa were invited to join the USISL Select League for the 1996 season, but did not return. The Los Angeles Galaxy made their Major League Soccer debut in April 1996 with Zambrano as an assistant coach and drafted Karapetyan from the Salsa. De La Pena had purchased Atlético de Celaya, an existing Mexican team, in 1995 and brought to the team to Los Angeles for exhibition matches the following year. The rights to a new USISL team in Orange County, purchased by Zambrano and a group of investors in August 1996, were used to create the Orange County Zodiac in 1997. Salsa assistant general manager Mark Rafter had also planned to bid for a USISL team.

== Stadiums ==
The Salsa played most of their home matches at Titan Stadium, a 10,000-seat stadium in the Orange County suburb of Fullerton. It was used primarily by Cal State Fullerton's soccer teams and was able to accommodate a regulation sized pitch for professional soccer. The Salsa signed a three-year lease with Cal State Fullerton for use of the stadium. The team also played some of its 1994 exhibition matches at Weingart Stadium on the campus of East Los Angeles College in Monterey Park, which had 22,355 seats.

== Year-by-year ==
| Year | Division | League | Reg. season | Playoffs | U.S. Open Cup | Continental | Avg. attendance |
|---|---|---|---|---|---|---|---|
| 1993 | 1 | APSL | 4th | Final | Did not enter | Did not qualify | |
| 1994 | 1 | APSL | 2nd | Semifinals | Did not enter | CCC: R2 | 3,341 |

== Players ==
- Jeff Agoos
- Yari Allnutt
- Bob Ammann
- Salvador Coreas Privado
- Paulinho Criciúma
- Albert "Beto" Diaz
- Dale Ervine
- Ian Feuer
- Mike Fox
- Kevin Grimes
- Patrick Garthwaite
- Waldir Guerra
- Philip Gyau
- Ken Hesse
- Zak Ibsen
- Harut Karapetyan
- Jerry Laterza
- Oscar Molina
- Omar Perez
- Rich Ryerson
- Marco Ruiz
- Jorge Salcedo
- Maciej Smagacz
- Brad Smith
- Kevin Smith
- Eddie Soto
- Bryan Spevak
- Jose Vasquez
- Arturo Velazco
- Hugo Pérez
