= Arizona Thunder =

- Founded: 1998
- Dissolved: 2000
- Ground: Arizona Veterans Memorial Coliseum
- Capacity: 15,505
- League: World Indoor Soccer League

The Arizona Thunder was a professional indoor soccer team based in Phoenix, Arizona, United States. In 1997, the team was a member of the Premier Soccer Alliance. In 1998, the alliance, with some additional teams, reconstituted itself as the World Indoor Soccer League (WISL). The Thunder continued to play in the WISL from 1998 to 2000. The team played in the Arizona Veterans Memorial Coliseum.

Many of the players grew up and played youth soccer in AZ including Randy Soderman, Rick Soderman, Jason Vanacour, Milo Iniguez, Mark Kerlin, Derick Brownell, Kenneth Wright (Thea), Sasha Hunter, Dave Cameron, Kevin Berry, Donny Gaillard, Greg Veatch along with many implants like Milos Tomic, Chris Sagar, Roger Salazar, Victor Gilgan,Chris Scotti, Tom Bratcher and the Dunn Brothers. Some games were televised on COX 9 In 1999 and in 2000. During the Thunder's three years in the WISL they averaged attendance of 4,261 fans per game.

== Year-by-year ==
Year	League	Reg. season	Playoffs	Avg. attendance
1998	PSA	3rd WISL, 3–4	Failed to Qualify	3,539
1999	WISL	6th WISL, 7–15	Failed to Qualify	4,183
2000	WISL	6th WISL, 8–16	Failed to Qualify	4,521

== Owner ==
John Ogden (Phoenix Power Soccer Club, Inc) 1998–2000

President/GM Mark Munhall

== Notable players ==
- Randy Soderman
- Rick Soderman
