= Sacramento Knights =

- Full name: Sacramento Knights
- Founded: 1993
- Dissolved: 2001
- Ground: ARCO Arena, Sacramento, California
- Capacity: 10,632
- League: Continental Indoor Soccer League World Indoor Soccer League

Sacramento Knights were an indoor soccer team that played from 1993 to 2001 in ARCO Arena and were owned by the NBA's Sacramento Kings. The team played in the Continental Indoor Soccer League from 1993 to 1997. The team then moved to the World Indoor Soccer League in 1998 after the CISL folded. The team itself folded when the WISL merged with the Major Indoor Soccer League in 2001.

== Personnel ==
The Knights were coached by retired English player Keith Weller from 1994 to 1997. Iain Fraser took over as head coach in 1998 as the team reformed in the Premier Soccer Alliance.

CISL award winners include 1995 Goalkeeper of the Year Mike Dowler, and two Defenders of the Year: Sean Bowers (1994) and Danny Pena (1995).

Iain Fraser won the Defender of the Year award in 1999 and 2001, while the Knights were part of the World Indoor Soccer League. Fraser took over as coach/player/director of the team until its end. Also as part of the WISL, Dan Madsen was goalkeeper of the year in 1998.

== Year-by-year ==
Year	League	Reg. season	Playoffs	Avg. attendance
1993	CISL	5th CISL, 12-16	Opted out of Playoffs	6,115
1994	CISL	4th West, 15-13	Lost Quarterfinal	6,961
1995	CISL	1st West, 20-8	Lost Championship	7,151
1996	CISL	3rd West, 14-14	Lost Quarterfinal	7,195
1997	CISL	3rd West, 14-14	Lost 1st Round	6,132
1998	PSA	2nd PSA, 6-5	Lost Championship	6,116
1999	WISL	1st WISL, 17-5	Won Championship	5,764
2000	WISL	7th WISL, 5-19	Opted out of playoffs	5,509
2001	WISL	4th WISL, 11-13	Lost Semifinal	5,136

== Notable players ==
- Iain Fraser
- Randy Soderman
- Rick Soderman

== See also ==
- Sacramento Knights players
