= East Los Angeles Cobras =

- Founded: 1993
- Dissolved: 1996
- League: USISL Pro League

The East Los Angeles Cobras were an American soccer team that played in East Los Angeles, California. They joined the USISL in 1993 and later became affiliated with the Los Angeles Salsa of the American Professional Soccer League. The Cobras moved to the USISL Pro League in 1995 and were temporarily renamed the Los Angeles Salsa U-23 as a replacement for the parent club.

== Year-by-year ==
Year	Division	League	Reg. season	Playoffs	Open Cup
1993	N/A	USISL	1st, Southwest	Sizzling Six	Did not enter
1994	3	USISL	1st, Southwest	Sizzling Nine	Did not enter
1995	3	USISL Pro League	1st, Western South	Divisional Finals	Did not qualify

== Coaches ==
- Octavio Zambrano: 1992–1994
