= Portland Pride =

- Founded: 1993
- Dissolved: 1997
- Stadium: Memorial Coliseum; Portland, Oregon
- Capacity: 12,888
- League: Continental Indoor Soccer League

The Portland Pride were an American indoor soccer team based in Portland, Oregon, that played in the Continental Indoor Soccer League (CISL) from 1993 to 1997.

== History ==
In 1993, a new league, the Continental Indoor Soccer League (CISL) began its first season. Traditionally, indoor soccer has been a winter sport, but the CISL decided to play a summer season. This would keep it from competing with the more established National Professional Soccer League.

Portland was announced as a founding member city for CISL on February 3, 1993. Owned by Brian Parrott, the team was named the "Pride" and played its home games in Portland, Oregon's Memorial Coliseum. In 1995, Parrott sold the team to a group led by Norm Daniels.

In 1997, the team and the league played its last season. At the end of the season, the Pride withdrew from the league due to a $2 million loss and a lack of confidence in the CISL, which later folded. The Pride ownership moved the team to the Premier Soccer Alliance where the team played under the name Portland Pythons.

== Coach ==
- John Bain 1993–1996
- Ian Fulton 1997

== Year-by-year ==
Year	Record	Regular season	Playoffs	Avg. attendance
1993	16–12	3rd	Semifinals	5,738
1994	15–15	5th Western	Out of playoffs	6,071
1995	11–17	5th Western	Out of playoffs	5,127
1996	10–18	5th Western	Out of playoffs	6,294
1997	13–15	4th Western	First Round	5,871
5	65–77	–	0–3	5,820

== Honors ==
First Team All Star

- 1995 Jeff Betts
