= World Indoor Soccer League =

Indoor soccer league

- Founded: 1998
- Folded: merged with MISL in 2001
- Country: United States; Mexico
- Number of clubs: 9
- Last champions: Dallas Sidekicks

The World Indoor Soccer League (WISL) was a United States–based indoor soccer league that operated from 1998 to 2001 and consisted of nine teams.

== History ==
After the demise of the Continental Indoor Soccer League, four of its teams decided to create a new indoor league to be called the Premier Soccer Alliance in 1998. The teams complemented their schedules with games against international teams. In 1999, two more former CISL teams (the Houston Hotshots and Monterrey La Raza) joined the league, which then changed its name to World Indoor Soccer League.

The World Indoor Soccer League (WISL) was formed through a merger between the US-based Premier Soccer Alliance and an English Indoor Football League, resulting in a name change from the original Premier Soccer League Alliance in 1999. Initially, plans included a European Division with teams like London United and Manchester Magic, but this concept was scrapped due to conflicting rules and lack of approval from The Football Association.

In 2000, the World Indoor Soccer League (WISL) considered a groundbreaking move, attempting to become the first U.S. professional sports league to sell its naming rights. The proposed deal would have resulted in a rebranded league, potentially named "The Pepsi World Indoor Soccer League." However, the effort ultimately did not come to fruition.

The WISL folded in December 2001 when Dallas, St. Louis, and San Diego agreed to join the MISL while the remaining teams, the Utah Freezz, the Sacramento Knights and the Houston Hotshots folded.

== Champions ==
=== Season by season ===
Season	Champion	Score / series	Runner-up
1998	Dallas Sidekicks	6 to 2	Sacramento Knights
1999	Sacramento Knights	7 to 6	Dallas Sidekicks
2000	Monterrey La Raza	6 to 5 (SO 3-1)	Dallas Sidekicks
2001	Dallas Sidekicks	2-1	San Diego Sockers

=== By team ===
Team	Championships	Runner up	Champions	Runner up
Dallas Sidekicks	2	2	1998, 2001	1999, 2000
Sacramento Knights	1	1	1999	1998
Monterrey La Raza	1	0	2000	
San Diego Sockers	0	1		2001

== Annual awards ==
=== Most Valuable Player ===
- 1998 – (Brazil) Tatu, Dallas
- 1999 – (Republic of Ireland) David Doyle, Dallas
- 2000 – (Argentina) Mariano Bollella, Monterrey
- 2001 – (Argentina) Ato Leone, Sacramento

=== Goalkeeper of the Year ===
- 1998 – (United States) Dan Madsen, Sacramento
- 1999 – (United States) Brett Phillips, Portland
- 2000 – (Brazil) Sagu (Edilson Xavier), Dallas
- 2001 – (Brazil) Sagu (Edilson Xavier), Dallas

=== Coach of the Year ===
- 1998 – (Brazil) Tatu, Dallas
- 1999 – (Canada) Iain Fraser, Sacramento
- 2000 – (United States) Jeff Betts, Utah
- 2001 – (Canada) Iain Fraser, Sacramento

=== Rookie of the Year ===
- 1998 – Jorge Fernandez, Sacramento
- 1999 – Justin Labrum, Utah
- 2000 – Clint Regier, Houston
- 2001 – David Beltran, San Diego

=== Defender of the Year ===
- 1998 – (United States) Rusty Troy, Dallas
- 1999 – (Canada) Iain Fraser, Sacramento
- 2000 – (Canada) Rob Baarts, Utah
- 2001 – (Canada) Iain Fraser, Sacramento

== Presidents ==
Gordon Jago 1998–2001

== Teams ==
Team	City/Area	Arena
Arizona Thunder	Phoenix, Arizona	Arizona Veterans Memorial Coliseum
Dallas Sidekicks	Dallas, Texas	Reunion Arena; American Airlines Center (One Game)
Houston Hotshots	Houston, Texas	The Summit; Reliant Arena
Monterrey La Raza	Monterrey, Nuevo León, Mexico	Gimnasio Nuevo León
Portland Pythons	Portland, Oregon	Rose Garden
Sacramento Knights	Sacramento, California	ARCO Arena
San Diego Sockers	San Diego, California	San Diego Sports Arena
St. Louis Steamers	St. Charles, Missouri	Family Arena
Utah Freezz	West Valley City, Utah	E-Center
