= 1999 Kansas City Wizards season =

Kansas City Wizards
1999 season
- Head coach: Ron Newman; Ken Fogarty; Bob Gansler
- Major League Soccer: West: 6th Overall: 11th
- Top goalscorer: League: Preki (7); All: Preki (7)
- Average home league attendance: 8,183
Home colors	Away colors

The 1999 Kansas City Wizards season was played at Arrowhead Stadium in Kansas City, Missouri. MLS did not allow matches to end in ties in 1999 and thus Shootouts were used to decide draws, the stats that follow do not include shootout goals scored and the teams actually point total in the regular season was 20 even though it is shown below as 24. Shootout win= 2 points, Shootout loss= 0 points. The Wizards first ever manager Ron Newman was let go and replaced with Bob Gansler.

== Squad ==
Note: Flags indicate national team as defined under FIFA eligibility rules; some limited exceptions apply. Players may hold more than one non-FIFA nationality.

No.	Pos.	Nation	Player
1	GK	USA	Tony Meola
2	DF	USA	Brandon Prideaux
3	FW	ENG	Paul Wright
3	DF	USA	Tony Soto
4	DF	USA	Scott Uderitz
5	FW	USA	Brian Johnson
6	DF	USA	Sean Bowers
7	MF	USA	Brian Loftin
8	MF	USA	Chris Brown
9	FW	CAN	Alex Bunbury
10	FW	SCO	Mo Johnston
11	MF	USA	Preki
12	FW	ZIM	Vitalis Takawira
13	MF	USA	Vicente Figueroa
14	DF	USA	Michael Green

No.	Pos.	Nation	Player
15	FW	USA	Scott Vermillion
16	MF	USA	Jake Dancy
17	MF	USA	Chris Klein
18	GK	USA	Chris Snitko
19	MF	USA	Chris Henderson
20	DF	NGR	Uche Okafor
21	MF	USA	Francisco Gomez
22	DF	USA	Alexi Lalas
23	FW	USA	Nino Da Silva
24	MF	USA	Ryan Turner
25	DF	YUG	Refik Sabanadzovic
30	GK	USA	Anthony Latronica
30	GK	MEX	Cesar Delgado
31	GK	USA	David Winner

== Competitions ==
=== Major League Soccer ===
Overall								Home						Away					
Pld	W	D	L	GF	GA	GD	Pts	W	D	L	GF	GA	GD	W	D	L	GF	GA	GD
32	8	0	24	33	53	−20	24	6	0	10	24	21	+3	2	0	14	9	32	−23

Last updated: 1999.
Source: Major League Soccer

Date	Opponents	H / A	Result F – A	Scorers	Attendance
March 20, 1999	Dallas Burn	A	0–4
March 27, 1999	Chicago Fire S.C.	H	0–3
April 3, 1999	New England Revolution	H	0–1
April 10, 1999	San Jose Earthquakes	H	1–1 (L)	Brown
April 17, 1999	Colorado Rapids	A	1–1 (L)	Lalas
April 24, 1999	Miami Fusion	A	0–1
April 28, 1999	Columbus Crew	H	0–1
May 8, 1999	Los Angeles Galaxy	H	2–1	Lalas; Klein
May 15, 1999	D.C. United	H	3–3 (L)	Henderson; Klein; Preki
May 22, 1999	Chicago Fire S.C.	A	1–3	Johnston
June 6, 1999	Los Angeles Galaxy	A	0–1
June 12, 1999	Dallas Burn	H	1–0	Own goal
June 20, 1999	MetroStars	H	6–0	Brown 2 Klein; Johnston; Preki; Gomez
June 26, 1999	D.C. United	A	0–3
July 3, 1999	Tampa Bay Mutiny	A	1–1 (W)	Bunbury
July 7, 1999	Colorado Rapids	H	1–2	Bunbury
July 10, 1999	Dallas Burn	A	0–5
July 22, 1999	Tampa Bay Mutiny	H	4–3	Lalas; Preki; Klein 2
July 25, 1999	Los Angeles Galaxy	A	1–2	Bunbury
July 31, 1999	San Jose Earthquakes	H	2–2 (W)	Preki 2
August 5, 1999	Chicago Fire S.C.	H	1–2	Johnston
August 8, 1999	Columbus Crew	A	1–2	Brown
August 14, 1999	MetroStars	A	2–1	Klein; Bunbury
August 25, 1999	Chicago Fire S.C.	A	0–2
August 29, 1999	Miami Fusion	H	2–0	Henderson; Preki
September 4, 1999	San Jose Earthquakes	A	0–2
September 7, 1999	New England Revolution	A	2–3	Preki; Henderson
September 10, 1999	Colorado Rapids	A	0–0 (L)
September 18, 1999	Dallas Burn	H	1–1 (L)	Lalas
September 25, 1999	Colorado Rapids	H	0–0 (L)
October 6, 1999	San Jose Earthquakes	A	0–1
October 9, 1999	Los Angeles Galaxy	H	0–1

== Squad statistics ==
No.	Pos.	Name	MLS		Total		Minutes		Discipline	
No.	Pos.	Name	Apps	Goals	Apps	Goals	League	Total	Yellow card	Red card
22	DF	(United States) Alexi Lalas	30	4	30	4	2700	2700	0	0
19	MF	(United States) Chris Henderson	30	3	30	3	2625	2625	0	0
11	MF	(United States) Preki	30	7	30	7	2572	2572	0	0
17	MF	(United States) Chris Klein	30	6	30	6	2198	2198	0	0
10	FW	(Scotland) Mo Johnston	29	3	29	3	2537	2537	0	0
8	MF	(United States) Chris Brown	28	4	28	4	1679	1679	0	0
20	DF	(Nigeria) Uche Okafor	26	0	26	0	2269	2269	0	0
5	FW	(United States) Brian Johnson	26	0	26	0	1674	1674	0	0
6	DF	(United States) Sean Bowers	25	0	25	0	1827	1827	0	0
19	MF	(United States) Scott Vermillion	24	0	24	0	1630	1630	0	0
13	--	(United States) Vicente Figueroa	22	0	22	0	1312	1312	0	0
9	FW	(Canada) Alex Bunbury	19	4	19	4	1579	1579	0	0
18	GK	(United States) Chris Snitko	16	0	16	0	1395	1395	0	0
12	FW	(Zimbabwe) Vitalis Takawira	18	0	18	0	651	651	0	0
2	DF	(United States) Brandon Prideaux	15	0	15	0	937	937	0	0
16	MF	(United States) Jake Dancy	14	0	14	0	964	964	0	0
1	GK	(United States) Tony Meola	9	0	9	0	765	765	0	0
23	FW	(United States) Nino DaSilva	8	0	8	0	331	331	0	0
31	--	(United States) David Winner	7	0	7	0	631	631	0	0
21	MF	(United States) Francisco Gomez	7	1	7	1	339	339	0	0
25	DF	(Federal Republic of Yugoslavia) Refik Sabanadzovic	6	0	6	0	436	436	0	0
3	FW	(England) Paul Wright	6	0	6	0	148	148	0	0
3	--	Tony Soto	4	0	4	0	176	176	0	0
4	DF	(United States) Scott Uderitz	2	0	2	0	143	143	0	0
30	--	Cesar Delgado	1	0	1	0	90	90	0	0

Final Statistics
