= 1997 Kansas City Wizards season =

Kansas City Wizards
1997 season
- Head coach: Ron Newman
- Major League Soccer: West: 1st Overall: 2nd
- USOC: Third Round
- Playoffs: Conference Semifinals
- Top goalscorer: League: Preki (12); All: Preki (13)
- Average home league attendance: 9,058
Home colors	Away colors	Third colors

The 1997 Kansas City Wizards season was the second in team and MLS history. Played at Arrowhead Stadium in Kansas City, Missouri.

MLS did not allow matches to end in ties and thus Shootouts were used to decide draws, the stats that follow do not include shootout goals scored and the teams actually point total in the regular season was 49 even though it is shown below as 63. Shootout win= 2 points, Shootout loss= 0 points.

== Squad ==
Note: Flags indicate national team as defined under FIFA eligibility rules; some limited exceptions apply. Players may hold more than one non-FIFA nationality.

No.	Pos.	Nation	Player
0	GK	USA	Mike Ammann
2	DF	USA	Steve Pittman
3	FW	ENG	Paul Wright
4	DF	SCO	Richard Gough
6	DF	USA	Sean Bowers
7	MF	USA	Diego Gutierrez
8	MF	USA	Damian Silvera
8	FW	USA	Jamel Mitchell
9	FW	USA	Ryan Tinsley
10	FW	SCO	Mo Johnston
11	MF	USA	Preki
12	FW	ZIM	Vitalis Takawira

No.	Pos.	Nation	Player
13	MF	USA	Mark Chung
14	FW	USA	Frank Klopas
16	MF	USA	John Diffley
17	MF	USA	Edmundo Rodriguez
18	GK	USA	Chris Snitko
19	MF	USA	Jake Dancy
19	DF	LBR	Dionysius Sebwe
20	DF	NGR	Uche Okafor
21	MF	USA	Matt McKeon
22	FW	USA	Brian Johnson
23	FW	USA	Nino DaSilva
27	DF	USA	John DeBrito

== Competitions ==
=== Major League Soccer ===
Overall								Home						Away					
Pld	W	D	L	GF	GA	GD	Pts	W	D	L	GF	GA	GD	W	D	L	GF	GA	GD
32	21	0	11	57	51	+6	63	12	0	4	35	24	+11	9	0	7	22	27	−5

Last updated: 1997.
Source: Major League Soccer

Date	Opponents	H / A	Result F – A	Scorers	Attendance
March 29, 1997	San Jose Earthquakes	H	2–2 (W)	Johnston; Preki
April 5, 1997	Los Angeles Galaxy	H	3–2	Takawira; Preki; Chung
April 12, 1997	Tampa Bay Mutiny	A	1–2	Preki
April 18, 1997	Dallas Burn	H	2–1	Klopas; Chung
April 27, 1997	Tampa Bay Mutiny	H	2–2 (L)	Johnston; Wright
May 3, 1997	New England Revolution	A	1–2	Preki
May 10, 1997	Los Angeles Galaxy	H	1–0	Preki
May 18, 1997	NY/NJ Metrostars	A	0–1
May 22, 1997	Columbus Crew	H	3–1	McKeon 2 Chung
May 30, 1997	Los Angeles Galaxy	A	3–1	Wright; Takawira; Own goal
June 6, 1997	Dallas Burn	A	1–1 (W)	Wright
June 8, 1997	San Jose Earthquakes	A	3–2	Chung; Preki 2
June 15, 1997	San Jose Earthquakes	H	1–3	Bowers
June 21, 1997	D.C. United	H	6–1	Wright; Klopas; Chung; Preki; Bowers; Rodriguez
June 25, 1997	Tampa Bay Mutiny	H	2–2 (W)	Wright; Chung
June 28, 1997	Colorado Rapids	A	3–3 (W)	Takawira 2 Johnston
July 4, 1997	Columbus Crew	A	2–1	Takawira 2
July 6, 1997	Dallas Burn	H	1–3	Tinsley
July 12, 1997	New England Revolution	A	0–2
July 19, 1997	D.C. United	H	3–2	Chung 2 Takawira
July 26, 1997	New England Revolution	H	0–0 (W)
August 2, 1997	Dallas Burn	A	2–1	Chung; Preki
August 9, 1997	Tampa Bay Mutiny	A	2–0	Bowers; Klopas
August 17, 1997	NY/NJ Metrostars	H	3–3 (W)	Klopas; Johnston; Chung
August 24, 1997	San Jose Earthquakes	A	2–2 (W)	Preki; McKeon
August 28, 1997	Colorado Rapids	H	1–0	Preki
August 31, 1997	D.C. United	A	0–2
September 6, 1997	Colorado Rapids	A	2–1	Johnson; Klopas
September 12, 1997	NY/NJ Metrostars	H	0–0 (L)
September 14, 1997	Columbus Crew	A	0–4
September 26, 1997	Colorado Rapids	H	5–2	Johnston 2 McKeon; Preki; Takawira
September 28, 1997	Los Angeles Galaxy	A	0–2

=== U.S. Open Cup ===
July 24, 1997 Third Round	San Francisco Bay Seals (California)	2–1	(Missouri) Kansas City Wizards	San Francisco, California
	White 1', 59'; Folan (yellow card) 18'; Simpson (yellow card) 60'		Klopas 40'; Johnston (yellow card) 60'; McKeon (yellow card) 66'; Preki (yellow card) 87'	Stadium: Negoesco Stadium; Attendance: 1,400; Referee: Tim Wayland

=== Eastern Conference semifinals ===
October 4, 1997 Game 1	Kansas City Wizards	0–3	Colorado Rapids	Kansas City, Missouri
	Pittman (yellow card) 35'; Tinsley (yellow card) 52'; Rodriguez (yellow card) 84'; Preki (yellow card) 84'	Report	Henderson 25'; Bravo 67'; Paule 75'	Stadium: Arrowhead Stadium; Attendance: 10,174; Referee: Brian Hall

October 8, 1997 Game 2	Colorado Rapids	3–2	Kansas City Wizards	Denver, Colorado
	Bravo 16', 68'; Harris 83'	Report	Takawira 9'; Gough (yellow card) 23'; McKeon (yellow card) 27'; Okafor (yellow card) 51'; Klopas (yellow card) 85'; Preki 88'	Stadium: Mile High Stadium; Attendance: 13,117; Referee: Paul Tamberino

== Squad statistics ==
No.	Pos.	Name	MLS		USOC		Playoffs		Total		Minutes		Discipline	
No.	Pos.	Name	Apps	Goals	Apps	Goals	Apps	Goals	Apps	Goals	League	Total	Yellow card	Red card
13	MF	(United States) Mark Chung	32	10	1	0	2	0	35	10	2871	3141	0	0
21	MF	(United States) Matt McKeon	31	4	1	0	2	0	34	4	2737	3007	0	0
9	MF	(United States) Ryan Tinsley	31	1	1	0	2	0	34	1	2588	2826	0	0
26	FW	(Scotland) Mo Johnston	29	6	1	0	2	0	32	6	2564	2834	0	0
3	FW	(England) Paul Wright	30	5	1	0	1	0	32	5	1646	1770	0	0
0	GK	(United States) Mike Ammann	29	0	0	0	2	0	31	0	2597	2777	0	0
20	DF	(Nigeria) Uche Okafor	27	0	1	0	2	0	30	0	2386	2641	0	0
11	MF	(United States) Preki	27	12	1	0	2	1	29	13	2330	2555	0	0
14	FW	(United States) Frank Klopas	27	5	1	1	2	0	30	6	1967	2123	0	0
12	FW	(Zimbabwe) Vitalis Takawira	28	8	0	0	2	1	30	9	2153	2299	0	0
6	DF	(United States) Sean Bowers	26	3	1	0	2	0	29	3	2017	2287	0	0
2	DF	(United States) Steve Pittman	26	0	1	0	2	0	29	0	2068	2317	0	0
4	DF	(Scotland) Richard Gough	17	0	0	0	2	0	19	0	1457	1637	0	0
17	MF	(United States) Edmundo Rodriguez	16	1	0	0	1	0	17	1	543	554	0	0
22	FW	(United States) Brian Johnson	14	1	1	0	0	0	15	1	951	966	0	0
18	GK	(United States) Chris Snitko	5	0	1	0	0	0	6	0	282	372	0	0
16	MF	(United States) John Diffley	6	0	0	0	0	0	6	0	148	148	0	0
8	MF	(United States) Damian Silvera	3	0	0	0	0	0	3	0	166	166	0	0
19	MF	(United States) Jake Dancy	3	0	0	0	0	0	3	0	116	116	0	0
27	DF	(United States) John DeBrito	2	0	0	0	1	0	3	0	53	74	0	0
8	FW	(United States) Jamel Mitchell	1	0	0	0	0	0	1	0	16	16	0	0
23	FW	(United States) Nino DaSilva	1	0	0	0	0	0	1	0	12	12	0	0

Final Statistics
