= 1998 Kansas City Wizards season =

Kansas City Wizards
1998 season
- Head coach: Ron Newman
- Major League Soccer: West: 6th Overall: 11th
- USOC: Third Round
- Top goalscorer: League: Mo Johnston (11); All: Mo Johnston (11)
- Average home league attendance: 8,073
| Home colors | Away colors |

The 1998 Kansas City Wizards season was the third MLS history. Played at Arrowhead Stadium in Kansas City, Missouri. MLS did not allow matches to end in ties in 1998 and thus Shootouts were used to decide draws, the stats that follow do not include shootout goals scored and the teams actually point total in the regular season was 32 even though it is shown below as 36. Shootout win= 1 point, Shootout loss= 0 points.

== Squad ==
Note: Flags indicate national team as defined under FIFA eligibility rules; some limited exceptions apply. Players may hold more than one non-FIFA nationality.

| No. | Pos. | Nation | Player |
|---|---|---|---|
| 1 | GK | USA | Mike Ammann |
| 2 | MF | USA | Matt McKeon |
| 3 | FW | ENG | Paul Wright |
| 4 | DF | USA | Scott Uderitz |
| 5 | MF | CRO | Goran Hunjak |
| 6 | DF | USA | Sean Bowers |
| 9 | FW | USA | Ryan Tinsley |
| 10 | FW | SCO | Mo Johnston |
| 11 | MF | USA | Preki |
| 12 | FW | ZIM | Vitalis Takawira |
| 13 | MF | USA | Mark Chung |
| 14 | FW | USA | John DeBrito |

| No. | Pos. | Nation | Player |
|---|---|---|---|
| 15 | FW | ENG | Paul Rideout |
| 15/19 | FW | USA | Scott Vermillion |
| 16 | MF | USA | Jake Dancy |
| 17 | MF | USA | Chris Klein |
| 18 | GK | USA | Chris Snitko |
| 20 | DF | NGR | Uche Okafor |
| 21 | DF | USA | Brian Bliss |
| 22 | FW | USA | Brian Johnson |
| 23 | FW | USA | Nino DaSilva |
| 24 | FW | USA | Pete Marino |
| 25 | DF | BIH | Refik Sabanadzovic |

== Competitions ==
=== Major League Soccer ===
| Overall | | | | | | | | Home | | | | | | Away | | | | | |
| Pld | W | D | L | GF | GA | GD | Pts | W | D | L | GF | GA | GD | W | D | L | GF | GA | GD |
|---|---|---|---|---|---|---|---|---|---|---|---|---|---|---|---|---|---|---|---|
| 32 | 12 | 0 | 20 | 45 | 50 | −5 | 36 | 10 | 0 | 6 | 26 | 14 | +12 | 2 | 0 | 14 | 19 | 36 | −17 |

Last updated: 1998.
Source: Major League Soccer

| Date | Opponents | H / A | Result F – A | Scorers | Attendance |
|---|---|---|---|---|---|
| March 21, 1998 | D.C. United | A | 2–3 | Johnston 2 |
| April 4, 1998 | MetroStars | H | 2–0 | Rideout; Preki |
| April 8, 1998 | Chicago Fire S.C. | H | 1–0 | Marino |
| April 11, 1998 | Miami Fusion | A | 1–1 (L) | Wright |
| April 18, 1998 | Los Angeles Galaxy | H | 1–2 | Rideout |
| April 25, 1998 | Dallas Burn | A | 1–3 | Tinsley |
| April 29, 1998 | Los Angeles Galaxy | H | 0–2 |
| May 13, 1998 | Tampa Bay Mutiny | A | 1–2 | Johnston |
| May 16, 1998 | New England Revolution | A | 3–1 | Takawira 3 |
| May 20, 1998 | Dallas Burn | A | 1–1 (W) | Own goal |
| May 23, 1998 | San Jose Earthquakes | H | 0–1 |
| May 27, 1998 | Columbus Crew | H | 1–1 (W) | Rideout |
| May 31, 1998 | Colorado Rapids | A | 1–2 | Takawira |
| June 6, 1998 | Tampa Bay Mutiny | H | 1–0 | Johnston |
| June 24, 1998 | Chicago Fire S.C. | A | 1–4 | Johnston |
| July 1, 1998 | New England Revolution | H | 1–0 | Preki |
| July 4, 1998 | Los Angeles Galaxy | A | 0–2 |
| July 11, 1998 | Dallas Burn | H | 2–0 | Wright; Johnston |
| July 19, 1998 | Colorado Rapids | H | 4–1 | Preki; Tinsley; Wright; Takawira |
| July 25, 1998 | San Jose Earthquakes | A | 1–1 (L) | Johnston |
| July 29, 1998 | MetroStars | A | 2–2 (L) | Preki; Wright |
| August 8, 1998 | Colorado Rapids | H | 3–1 | Johnston 2 Wright |
| August 13, 1998 | Los Angeles Galaxy | A | 0–3 |
| August 16, 1998 | Columbus Crew | A | 3–5 | Preki 2 Rideout |
| August 23, 1998 | Miami Fusion | H | 2–0 | Takawira; Vermillion |
| August 26, 1998 | D.C. United | H | 1–2 | Preki |
| August 29, 1998 | Chicago Fire S.C. | H | 2–2 (L) | Chung; Johnston |
| September 2, 1998 | Colorado Rapids | A | 2–3 | Takawira; Chung |
| September 5, 1998 | San Jose Earthquakes | H | 5–1 | Johnston; Preki 3 Wright |
| September 17, 1998 | Chicago Fire S.C. | A | 0–1 |
| September 19, 1998 | Dallas Burn | H | 0–1 |
| September 27, 1998 | San Jose Earthquakes | A | 0–2 |

=== U.S. Open Cup ===
| Date | Round | Opponents | H / A | Result F – A | Scorers | Attendance |
|---|---|---|---|---|---|---|
| July 8, 1998 | Third Round | Nashville Metros | A | 1–3 | Rideout |

== Squad statistics ==
| No. | Pos. | Name | MLS | | USOC | | Total | | Minutes | | Discipline | |
| No. | Pos. | Name | Apps | Goals | Apps | Goals | Apps | Goals | League | Total | Yellow card | Red card |
|---|---|---|---|---|---|---|---|---|---|---|---|---|
| 13 | MF | (United States) Mark Chung | 30 | 2 | 1 | 0 | 31 | 2 | 2551 | 2641 | 0 | 0 |
| 3 | FW | (England) Paul Wright | 30 | 6 | 1 | 0 | 31 | 6 | 2060 | 2150 | 0 | 0 |
| 9 | MF | (United States) Ryan Tinsley | 30 | 2 | 0 | 0 | 30 | 2 | 2305 | 2305 | 0 | 0 |
| 6 | DF | (United States) Sean Bowers | 29 | 0 | 0 | 0 | 29 | 0 | 2565 | 2565 | 0 | 0 |
| 12 | FW | (Zimbabwe) Vitalis Takawira | 29 | 7 | 0 | 0 | 29 | 7 | 1769 | 1769 | 0 | 0 |
| 0 | GK | (United States) Mike Ammann | 27 | 0 | 1 | 0 | 28 | 0 | 2430 | 2520 | 0 | 0 |
| 15 | FW | (England) Paul Rideout | 27 | 4 | 1 | 1 | 28 | 5 | 2114 | 2204 | 0 | 0 |
| 10 | FW | (Scotland) Mo Johnston | 26 | 11 | 1 | 0 | 27 | 11 | 2080 | 2170 | 0 | 0 |
| 11 | MF | (United States) Preki | 25 | 10 | 1 | 0 | 26 | 10 | 2164 | 2254 | 0 | 0 |
| 20 | DF | (Nigeria) Uche Okafor | 22 | 0 | 1 | 0 | 23 | 0 | 1967 | 2057 | 0 | 0 |
| 19 | MF | (United States) Scott Vermillion | 22 | 1 | 1 | 0 | 23 | 1 | 1955 | 2045 | 0 | 0 |
| 2 | MF | (United States) Matt McKeon | 22 | 0 | 1 | 0 | 23 | 0 | 1875 | 1965 | 0 | 0 |
| 4 | DF | (United States) Scott Uderitz | 22 | 0 | 1 | 0 | 23 | 0 | 1660 | 1750 | 0 | 0 |
| 25 | DF | (Federal Republic of Yugoslavia) Refik Sabanadzovic | 21 | 0 | 1 | 0 | 22 | 0 | 1644 | 1719 | 0 | 0 |
| 17 | MF | (United States) Chris Klein | 17 | 0 | 0 | 0 | 17 | 0 | 782 | 782 | 0 | 0 |
| 5 | MF | (Croatia) Goran Hunjak | 12 | 0 | 1 | 0 | 13 | 0 | 261 | 276 | 0 | 0 |
| 24 | FW | (United States) Pete Marino | 11 | 1 | 0 | 0 | 11 | 1 | 276 | 276 | 0 | 0 |
| 14 | DF | (United States) John DeBrito | 9 | 0 | 0 | 0 | 9 | 0 | 267 | 267 | 0 | 0 |
| 22 | FW | (United States) Brian Johnson | 6 | 0 | 0 | 0 | 6 | 0 | 140 | 140 | 0 | 0 |
| 18 | GK | (United States) Chris Snitko | 5 | 0 | 0 | 0 | 5 | 0 | 450 | 450 | 0 | 0 |
| 21 | DF | (United States) Brian Bliss | 3 | 0 | 0 | 0 | 3 | 0 | 106 | 106 | 0 | 0 |
| 16 | MF | (United States) Jake Dancy | 2 | 0 | 0 | 0 | 2 | 0 | 135 | 135 | 0 | 0 |
| 23 | FW | (United States) Nino DaSilva | 1 | 0 | 0 | 0 | 1 | 0 | 32 | 32 | 0 | 0 |

Final Statistics
