= List of Sporting Kansas City seasons =

Since its foundation in 1996, the American soccer club Sporting Kansas City has played in Major League Soccer. The team has won the MLS Cup twice, and the U.S. Open Cup four times. The following list is inclusive of all competitive competitions that the club has participated in.

Peter Vermes was the team's coach from 2009 to 2025, a 15-year tenure that was the longest in MLS history and included an MLS Cup title in 2013.

== Key ==
Key to competitions

- Major League Soccer (MLS) – The top-flight of soccer in the United States, established in 1996.
- U.S. Open Cup (USOC) – The premier knockout cup competition in U.S. soccer, first contested in 1914.
- CONCACAF Champions League (CCL) – The premier competition in North American soccer since 1962. It went by the name of Champions' Cup until 2008.

Key to colors and symbols

1st or W	Winners
2nd or RU	Runners-up
3rd	Third place
Last	Wooden Spoon
♦	MLS Golden Boot
	Highest average attendance
Italics	Ongoing competition

Key to league record

- Season = The year and article of the season
- Div = Division/level on pyramid
- League = League name
- Pld = Games played
- W = Games won
- L = Games lost
- D = Games drawn
- GF = Goals for
- GA = Goals against
- GD = Goal difference
- Pts = Points
- PPG = Points per game
- Conf. = Conference position
- Overall = League position

Key to cup record

- DNE = Did not enter
- DNQ = Did not qualify
- NH = Competition not held or canceled
- QR = Qualifying round
- PR = Preliminary round
- GS = Group stage
- R1 = First round
- R2 = Second round
- R3 = Third round
- R4 = Fourth round
- R5 = Fifth round
- Ro16 = Round of 16
- QF = Quarterfinals
- SF = Semifinals
- F = Final
- RU = Runners-up
- W = Winners

== Seasons ==
Season	League									Position		Playoffs	USOC	Continental			Average attendance (Note: Average attendance only includes statistics from regular season matches.)	Top goalscorer(s) (Note: Top goalscorer(s) includes all goals scored in the regular season, MLS Cup Playoffs, U.S. Open Cup, MLS is Back Tournament, CONCACAF Champions League, FIFA Club World Cup, and other competitive continental matches.)	
Season	Pld	W	L	D	GF	GA	GD	Pts	PPG	Conf.	Overall	Playoffs	USOC	CCL	LC	Other(s)	Average attendance	Name(s)	Goals
1996	32	17	15	0	61	63	–2	41	1.28	3rd	5th	SF	QF	DNE	NH	—	12,878	(United States) Preki	22
1997	32	21	11	0	57	51	+6	49	1.53	1st	2nd	QF	Ro16	DNQ	NH	—	9,058	(United States) Preki	13♦ (Note: Preki won the MLS Golden Boot (41 points))
1998	32	12	20	0	45	50	–5	32	1.00	6th	11th	DNQ	Ro16	DNQ	NH	—	8,072	(Scotland) Mo Johnston	11
1999	32	8	24	0	33	53	–20	20	0.63	6th	11th	DNQ	DNQ	DNQ	NH	—	8,183	(United States) Preki	7
2000	32	16	7	9	47	29	+18	57	1.78	1st	1st	W	R2	DNQ	NH	—	9,112	(Denmark) Miklos Molnar	17
2001	27	11	13	3	33	53	–20	36	1.33	3rd	7th	QF	Ro16	NH	NH	Copa Merconorte (GS)	10,954	(United States) Roy Lassiter	10
2002	28	9	10	9	37	45	–8	36	1.29	5th	8th	QF	SF	SF	NH	—	12,255	(United States) Preki	12
2003	30	11	10	9	48	44	+4	42	1.40	2nd	4th	SF	Ro16	DNQ	NH	—	15,573	(United States) Preki	12♦ (Note: Preki won the MLS Golden Boot (41 points))
2004	30	14	9	7	38	30	+8	49	1.63	1st	2nd	RU	W	DNQ	NH	—	14,816	(United States) Davy Arnaud	14
2005	32	11	9	12	52	44	+8	45	1.41	5th	9th	DNQ	QF	QF	NH	—	9,691	(United States) Josh Wolff	12
2006	32	10	14	8	43	45	–2	38	1.19	5th	11th	DNQ	Ro16	DNQ	NH	—	11,083	(Trinidad and Tobago) Scott Sealy	11
2007	30	11	12	7	45	45	0	40	1.33	5th	8th	SF	QR1	DNQ	NH	—	11,586	(United States) Eddie Johnson	15
2008	30	11	10	9	37	39	–2	42	1.40	4th	6th	QF	QF	DNQ	NH	—	10,686	(United States) Davy Arnaud	8
2009	30	8	13	9	33	42	–9	33	1.10	6th	13th	DNQ	QF	DNQ	NH	SuperLiga (GS)	10,053	(United States) Josh Wolff	11
2010	30	11	13	6	36	35	+1	39	1.30	3rd	9th	DNQ	QR2	DNQ	NH	—	10,287	(Sierra Leone) Kei Kamara	10
2011	34	13	9	12	50	40	+10	51	1.50	1st	5th	SF	QF	DNQ	NH	—	17,810	(United States) Teal Bunbury	12
2012	34	18	7	9	42	27	+15	63	1.85	1st	2nd	QF	W	DNQ	NH	—	19,405	(Sierra Leone) Kei Kamara	12
2013	34	17	10	7	47	30	+17	58	1.71	2nd	2nd	W	Ro16	QF	NH	—	19,405	(Argentina) Claudio Bieler	12
2014	34	14	13	7	48	41	+7	49	1.44	5th	10th	R1	Ro16	GS	NH	—	19,950	(United States) Dom Dwyer	24
2015	34	14	11	9	48	45	+3	51	1.50	6th	10th	R1	W	DNQ	NH	—	19,371	(United States) Dom Dwyer	17
2016	34	13	13	8	42	41	+1	47	1.38	5th	8th	R1	Ro16	GS	NH	—	19,512	(United States) Dom Dwyer	12
2017	34	12	9	13	40	29	+11	49	1.44	5th	11th	R1	W	DNQ	NH	—	19,565	(Guinea-Bissau) Gerso Fernandes	8
2018	34	18	8	8	65	40	+25	62	1.82	1st	3rd	SF	QF	DNQ	NH	—	19,774	(Hungary) Dániel Sallói	13
2019	34	10	16	8	49	67	–18	38	1.12	11th	21st	DNQ	R4	SF	DNE	—	18,601	(Chile) Felipe Gutiérrez	12
2020	21	12	6	3	38	25	+13	39	1.86	1st	3rd	QF	NH	DNQ	DNQ/NH	MLS is Back (QF)	21,188	(Mexico) Alan Pulido	7
2021	34	17	7	10	58	40	+18	58	1.7	3rd	4th	QF	NH	DNQ	QF	—	18,757	(Hungary) Dániel Sallói	16
2022	34	11	16	7	42	54	-12	40	1.18	12th	23rd	DNQ	SF	DNQ	NH	—	18,365	(Scotland) Johnny Russell	8
2023	34	12	14	8	48	51	-3	44	1.29	8th	15th	QF	R32	DNQ	R32	—	18,616	(Mexico) Alan Pulido	14
2024	34	8	19	7	51	66	–15	31	0.91	13th	27th	DNQ	RU	DNQ	R32	—	21,193	(Nigeria) William Agada	10
2025	34	7	20	7	46	70	-20	28	0.82	15th	27th	DNQ	DNQ	R1	DNQ	—	16,604	(Serbia) Dejan Joveljić	18
Total	956	377	368	211	1,359	1,334	+49	1,307	1.37	—	—	—	—	—	—	—	—	(United States) Preki	81
