= MLS Cup 2000 =

2000 edition of the MLS Cup

- Event: MLS Cup
Kansas City Wizards	Chicago Fire
1	0
- Date: October 15, 2000
- Venue: Robert F. Kennedy Memorial Stadium, Washington, D.C., U.S.
- MLS Cup MVP: Tony Meola (Kansas City Wizards)
- Referee: Paul Tamberino
- Attendance: 39,159
- Weather: Sunny, 77 °F (25 °C)

MLS Cup 2000 was the fifth edition of the MLS Cup, the championship soccer match of Major League Soccer (MLS), the top-level soccer league of the United States. It took place on October 15, 2000, at Robert F. Kennedy Memorial Stadium in Washington, D.C., and was contested by the Kansas City Wizards and Chicago Fire to decide the champion of the 2000 MLS season.

Both teams finished atop their respective divisions, with the Wizards winning the Supporters' Shield for best overall record. The 2000 final was the first edition to not feature a team from the Eastern Division due to the three-division system used from 2000 to 2001. Kansas City had finished the 1999 season with the second-worst record in MLS, but used key acquisitions to improve under second-year coach Bob Gansler. Chicago were attempting to win their second MLS Cup title in three years.

The Wizards won 1–0 and became the first Western Division team to win the MLS Cup. The lone goal of the match was scored by Miklos Molnar in the first half; goalkeeper Tony Meola was named the match's most valuable player for his ten saves to earn a shutout. The final was played in front of 39,159 spectators and broadcast nationally on ABC.

== Venue ==
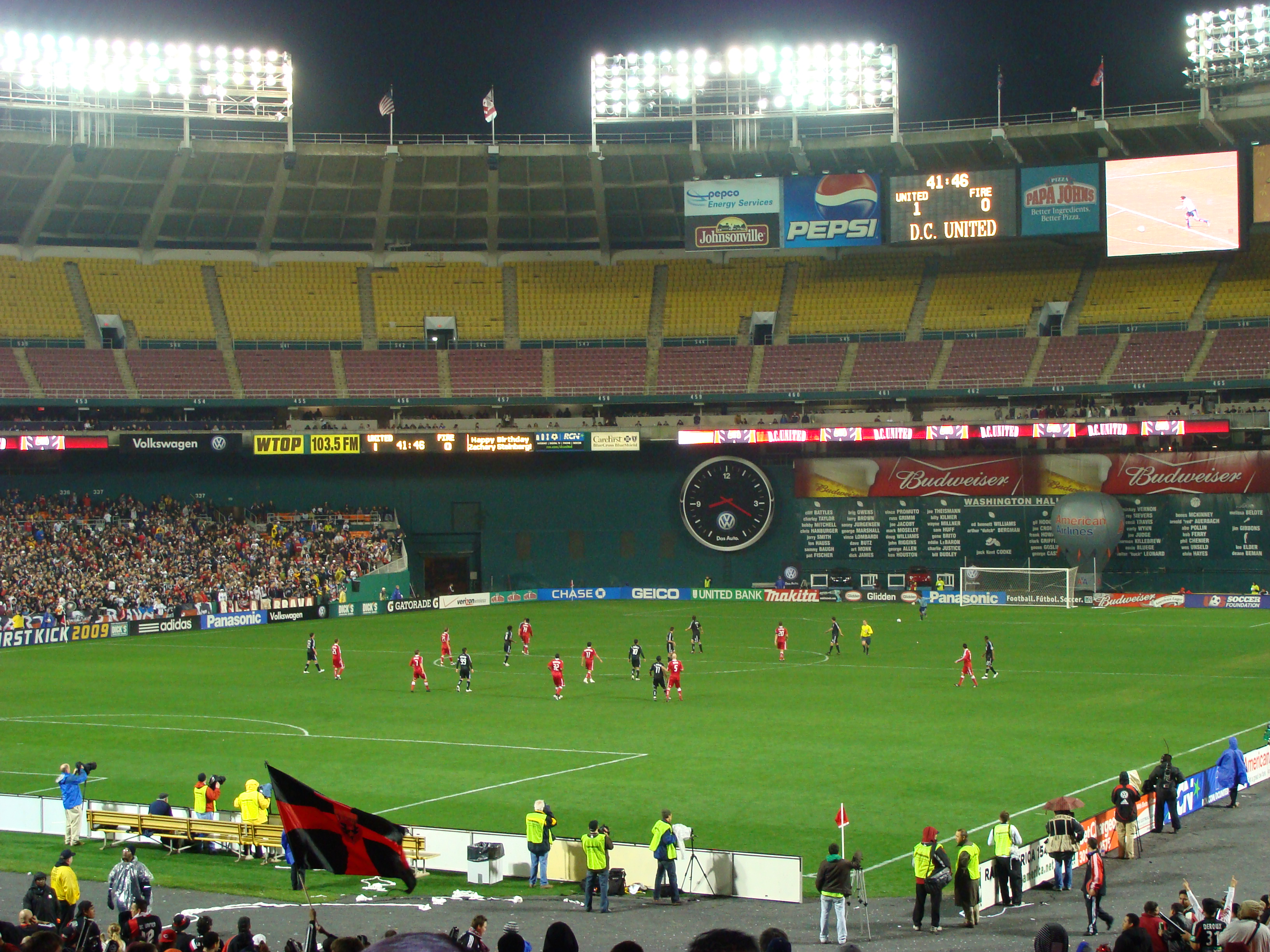
Robert F. Kennedy Memorial Stadium hosted the MLS Cup final for the second time.

Robert F. Kennedy Memorial Stadium in Washington, D.C., the home of D.C. United, was announced as the host venue of MLS Cup 2000 on February 23, 2000. At the time of the match in October 2000, seating capacity of the stadium was 56,454 spectators. The other bidder, Raymond James Stadium in Tampa, Florida, had been favored by the league and was unable to resolve a scheduling conflict with a college football team until too late in the selection process.

The stadium previously hosted MLS Cup 1997, during which United won their second league championship; it was also part of the 1994 FIFA World Cup and the 1996 Olympics men's soccer tournament. The 2000 final was the first MLS Cup to not feature D.C. United, as the team failed to qualify for the playoffs. United sold over 38,000 tickets prior to the match, with prices ranging from $25 to $80. A pre-match gala was held at the Ronald Reagan Building and International Trade Center in Washington, D.C. to present the 2000 season awards for MLS players and coaches.

== Road to the final ==
The MLS Cup is the post-season championship of Major League Soccer, a professional club soccer league based in the United States. The 2000 season was the fifth in the league's history and was contested by twelve teams organized into three divisions (later renamed conferences), each with four teams. The 32-match regular season, which ran for 26 weeks from March to September, was arranged to have each team play opponents within their division four times and six teams outside of their division twice; the regular season also had a set of four home-and-away matches for two out-of-division teams, determined by standings from the opposite conference in the 1999 season. Prior to the season, MLS eliminated the previously used countdown clock and shootout tiebreakers in favor of international rules. Referees would manage time on a count-up clock with stoppage time and tied matches would be allowed following two periods of five-minute golden goal overtime.

The MLS Cup Playoffs ran from mid-September to October and was contested by the winners of the three divisions and five wild card teams with the most points regardless of division, who were then seeded based on overall standings. The playoffs were organized into three rounds, the first two being a home-and-away series organized into a best-of-three format. Teams were awarded three points for a win and one point for a draw, and the first team to earn five points would advance. The MLS Cup final remained a single match at a predetermined venue.

MLS Cup 2000 was contested by the Kansas City Wizards of the Western Division and the Chicago Fire of the Central Division. Both teams finished atop their respective divisions with 57 points, but the Wizards clinched the Supporters' Shield on the goal difference tiebreaker by two goals. The Fire, who won the MLS Cup in 1998, were the top-scoring team during the 2000 season, while the Wizards conceded the fewest goals. Kansas City and Chicago met twice during the regular season, trading wins at home; the Wizards won 4–3 on March 25 and the Fire won 3–2 on June 4. MLS Cup 2000 was the first edition of the league's championship to not feature D.C. United, whose stadium was used for the match.

=== Kansas City Wizards ===
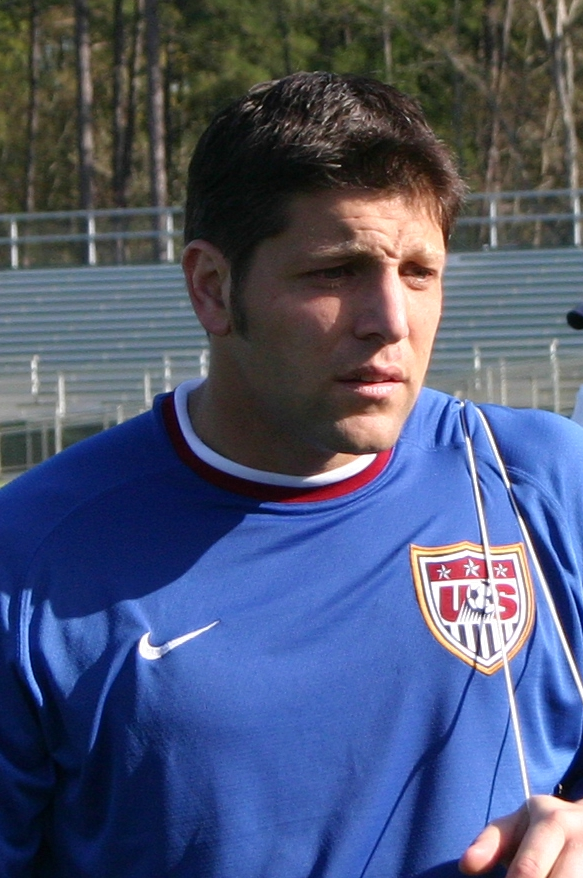
Goalkeeper Tony Meola was named the league MVP and set an MLS record with 16 shutouts during the regular season.

The Kansas City Wizards (originally the "Wiz") qualified for the playoffs in their first two seasons, finishing atop the Western Conference in 1997, but had never appeared in the MLS Cup final. The Wizards then finished with a 12–20 record in 1998 and failed to qualify for the playoffs under head coach Ron Newman, who was fired after a 0–7 start the following year. Newman was replaced by Bob Gansler, who finished the 1999 season with a 8–24 record, the second-worst in the league, while rebuilding the team's roster. Several members of the inaugural season's team, including forward Vitalis Takawira and defenders Sean Bowers and Scott Uderitz, were waived by the Wizards at the end of the 1999 season, while Alexi Lalas announced his retirement.

Gansler and new general manager Curt Johnson made several key signing in the offseason, beginning with the acquisition of Danish forward Miklos Molnar from Sevilla F.C. in January 2000. The Wizards traded defender Scott Vermillion to the Colorado Rapids in exchange for defenders Peter Vermes and Matt McKeon, who had previously played for the Wiz. The team signed two players they selected in the 2000 MLS SuperDraft: defender Nick Garcia, the second-overall pick, and Kerry Zavagnin, a third-round pick from the A-League. Kansas City finished their preseason with a 3–2–2 record, including two weeks in Bolivia, and saw the return of goalkeeper Tony Meola from an injury that kept him from playing for most of the 1999 season.

The Wizards opened the 2000 season with a 4–3 defeat of the Chicago Fire and went on an eleven-match unbeaten streak, amassing a 10–0–2 record through the end of May. The team's turnaround was credited to an improved defense, conceding only five goals and allowing Meola to earn a league-record shutout streak of 681 minutes, and consistent production from Molnar, who scored nine goals. The streak was broken by Chicago, who won 3–2 at Soldier Field on June 4, but Kansas City remained atop the league standings with an eight-point lead over the Los Angeles Galaxy in the Western Division.

Kansas City went winless in four league matches for most of June, in part due to the absence of Molnar while playing for the Danish national team, but maintained their home shutout streak. The team were also eliminated from the U.S. Open Cup in a penalty shootout by the Chicago Sockers of the USL Premier Development League in the third tier. After a 2–0 defeat of the Galaxy and a scoreless draw with the San Jose Earthquakes, the Wizards were shutout in three consecutive losses and ended July with a 3–1 victory against the Columbus Crew. Kansas City was represented in the 2000 MLS All-Star Game with five players, including West captain Preki, and manager Bob Gansler.

The Wizards' lead in the Western Division standings narrowed to four points by early August as the team lost 5–1 and drew 1–1 with the Galaxy in back-to-back matches. Kansas City then lost Meola to a national team call-up and forwards Molnar and Mo Johnston to injuries, but were able to win 3–0 in San Jose with a starting lineup of reserve players. Following a 2–1 loss to the Miami Fusion at home, the Wizards began a five-match stretch to close out the season, including four matches played on the road. The team earned draws against the MetroStars and Colorado Rapids, clinching a playoff spot, while four of its forwards were sidelined with injuries. Kansas City clinched the Western Division title with a 1–0 road victory against the New England Revolution, which was followed by the Supporters' Shield through a draw against the Tampa Bay Mutiny with several reserve players. Gansler was named Coach of the Year for his team's improved record, while Tony Meola earned the MLS MVP Award, Goalkeeper of the Year, and Comeback Player of the Year for his league-record 16 shutouts. Peter Vermes was also named Defender of the Year for his role in the Wizards' league-best 29 goals conceded.

In the quarterfinals of the MLS Cup Playoffs, Kansas City faced the eighth-seed Colorado Rapids, who had eliminated them in the first round of the 1997 playoffs. The Wizards opened their playoff run with a 1–0 victory at home through a Molnar goal in the 18th minute, but were held to a scoreless draw at Mile High Stadium in Denver to force a third match in the series. The Rapids had the majority of scoring chances in both matches, but were denied by Meola's goalkeeping and a strong defensive performance from the Wizards. Kansas City advanced to the semifinals with a 3–2 victory at home in the third leg of the series, clinching a 7–1 lead on points. The Wizards took the lead in the 11th minute through a goal from Chris Henderson and followed up with two goals early in the second half from Molnar in the 65th minute and Francisco Gomez in the 69th minute; Paul Bravo scored for the Rapids a minute after Gomez's goal, but the team failed to mount a comeback after Junior Agogo was sent off with a red card.

The Wizards played the semifinals against the fifth-seeded Los Angeles Galaxy, who had eliminated them in the 1996 playoffs and had finished as MLS Cup runners-up in 1999. The first leg at Arrowhead Stadium in Kansas City ended in a scoreless draw as six yellow cards were given to players, including three in overtime. The Wizards lost the second leg at the Rose Bowl in overtime by a 2–1 scoreline, having earned a 1–1 draw in regulation time. Kansas City fell behind in the 16th minute from a shot by Cobi Jones, but midfielder Matt McKeon equalized in the 29th minute; substitute defender Danny Califf, who had returned from the Summer Olympics team, scored a header in the third minute of golden goal overtime to clinch a Galaxy victory. In the deciding third leg at Arrowhead Stadium, the Wizards went ahead in the 22nd minute through a Molnar penalty kick and won 1–0 in regulation time, tying the series at four points apiece. During the sixth minute of the ensuing sudden-death overtime, Molnar scored the team's first golden goal of the season by collecting an errant ball from Danny Califf, who had also conceded the penalty kick in regulation time.

=== Chicago Fire ===
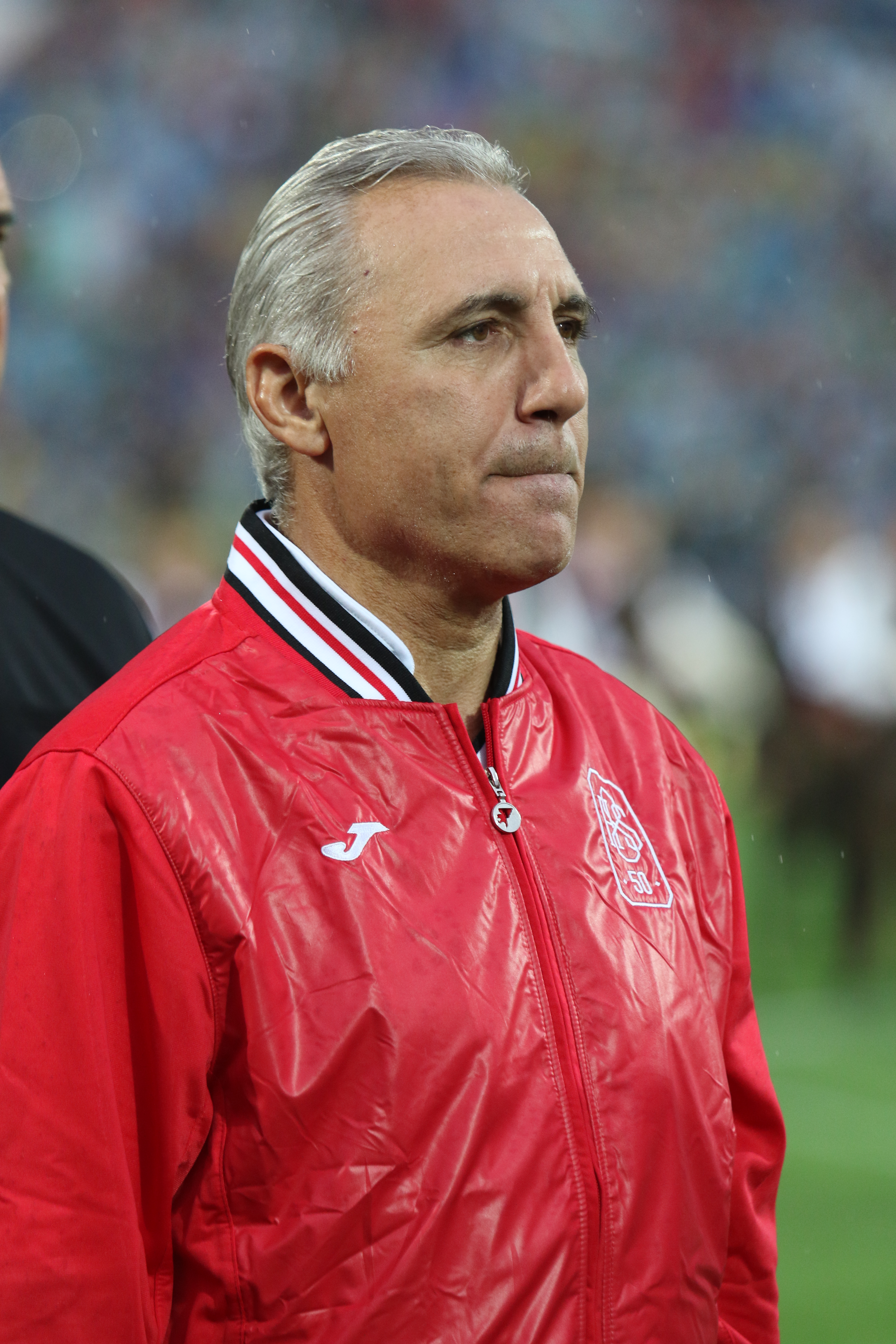
Bulgarian forward Hristo Stoichkov (pictured in 2016) signed a one-year contract to join the Chicago Fire in 2000

The Chicago Fire entered the league as an expansion team in 1998 and won the MLS Cup and U.S. Open Cup in their inaugural season under the direction of head coach Bob Bradley and a core of veteran players from Eastern Europe. Their second season ended in the first round of the playoffs, where they were eliminated by the Dallas Burn, who mounted a comeback in the third match of the series to win 3–2. The Fire were able to retain most of their starting players over the offseason, but released veterans Roman Kosecki and Jerzy Podbrożny to Polish clubs and lost Frank Klopas to retirement. In early February, Chicago acquired midfielder DaMarcus Beasley from Los Angeles and selected defender Carlos Bocanegra with the fourth pick in the MLS SuperDraft to add younger talent to their starting lineup. Bulgarian forward Hristo Stoichkov was signed to a one-year contract the following month to serve as a veteran star for the team; his signing required the trade of Francis Okaroh to Miami for compliance with the league's salary cap.

After a month-long preseason in Florida and Costa Rica, the Fire began their regular season campaign with four consecutive away matches and played without goalkeeper Zach Thornton due to a calf injury. Chicago were defeated in their first two matches, losing 4–2 to Dallas and 4–3 to Kansas City, while captain Peter Nowak and midfielder Chris Armas were sidelined with their own injuries. Backup goalkeeper Greg Sutton was waived by the team after starting in the two losses and replaced by Chris Snitko, acquired in a trade with Kansas City; Snitko's acquisition forced a further trade of forward Junior Agogo to comply with the league's salary cap ahead of the signing of veteran midfielder Mike Sorber from the New England Revolution. The Fire closed out their road tour with a 2–0 victory against the Columbus Crew and a 2–3 loss to D.C. United in overtime.

Chicago returned home to Soldier Field with a 1–0 victory against the Miami Fusion, due in part to Thornton's return from his injury and the debuts of Bocanegra and Sorber for the team. The Fire settled into a stretch of five home fixtures over seven matches, winning four times and improving their record to 6–5–1 to overtake Dallas and Tampa Bay for first place in the Central Division. Stoichkov was left out of the starting lineup for most of May due to a groin strain and replaced by Ante Razov, who recorded 10 goals in 12 matches to lead MLS in scoring and earned the first hat-trick in club history. Chicago also lost a trio of key players—Razov, Armas, and defender C. J. Brown—to the U.S. national team for the 2000 U.S. Cup for two weeks in June; as a result, the team dipped into second in the Central Division before regaining their lead with a victories against Kansas City and Miami at home.

The Fire stayed atop the Central Division and were five points behind Kansas City in the overall league standings by late June, but conceded late goals to tie Los Angeles and San Jose during a three-match road trip. As the team entered a crowded stretch of league and U.S. Open Cup matches, they lost several players to international call-ups as well as both Stoichkov to a torn groin muscle and defender Luboš Kubík to a sprained knee for a month. Chicago fell behind Tampa Bay in the Central Division standings entering the All-Star break at the end of July after several draws and overtime matches. The Fire defeated Tampa Bay to draw level with them on points atop the Central Division and the two team stayed tied through two more matches in mid-August.

With four of six remaining matches against Central Division rivals, the Fire began an unbeaten streak to clinch the division title and earn a 17–9–6 overall record for the regular season. Following a victory against the Los Angeles Galaxy and tie with Tampa Bay, the latter ending with two injured defenders, Chicago won three consecutive home matches to reach second place in the overall league standings. The Fire finished the regular season with a 3–2 victory in Columbus and tied Kansas City atop the league standings with 57 points, but lost the Supporters' Shield through a tiebreaker. Chicago would enter the playoffs without several injured players as well as Olympic call-ups Josh Wolff and Evan Whitfield, requiring additional lineup changes. Bocanegra won the MLS Rookie of the Year Award, while the midfield trio of Armas, Nowak, and Stoichkov were named to the MLS Best XI for their regular season performances.

In the playoff quarterfinals, Chicago faced the seventh-seeded New England Revolution, the only team they hadn't defeated during the regular season. The first leg, played on damaged turf at Soldier Field after a National Football League game, remained scoreless at half-time but opened with a goal in the 50th minute by Wolde Harris to give the visiting Revolution a lead. The Fire responded with an equalizer four minutes later through an own goal by Mauricio Wright and a second goal in the 73rd minute from Dema Kovalenko to win 2–1. The series was tied at three points apiece after New England won 2–1 in the second leg at Foxboro Stadium, taking the lead through a goal from Eric Wynalda in the 18th minute. A penalty from Stoichkov was saved in first-half stoppage time, but Kovalenko managed to score an equalizer for Chicago in the 83rd minute; the Revolution responded two minutes later with a header from Wright to force a decisive third match. The Fire hosted the final quarterfinal leg and set an MLS record for largest margin of victory in the playoffs by winning 6–0, scoring four times during the first half. Stoichkov and Razov each scored twice, the latter earning four assists to set a team record, while Nowak added a first-half stoppage time shot and Sam George finished off the match in the 75th minute with his goal.

The Fire opened their semifinal series against the New York/New Jersey MetroStars with a 3–0 victory at Soldier Field despite missing Nowak to a hamstring injury. Stoichkov and Kovalenko each scored in the first half, while Razov added an insurance goal late in the second half and Thornton made eight saves to keep a shutout. The MetroStars played the second leg with first-choice goalkeeper Mike Ammann, who had returned from injury, and shutout the Fire 2–0 at Giants Stadium to force a third match in the series. Mark Chung opened the scoring in the 40th minute and Adolfo Valencia added an insurance goal in the 84th minute, while the Fire offense were stifled and unable to create scoring chances until late in the second half. Chicago clinched a series victory and their second MLS Cup berth by defeating the MetroStars 3–2 at Soldier Field. Following goals from Brown and Stoichkov in the first half-hour of the match, the MetroStars rallied with a pair of goals from Valencia within four minutes to tie the match at 2–2 heading into half-time. The winning goal came in the 88th minute from Razov, who received a long pass from Armas and dribbled around Ammann to break the second-half deadlock.

=== Summary of results ===
Note: In all results below, the score of the finalist is given first (H: home; A: away). Playoffs were in best-of-three format requiring five points to advance and sudden death extra time as a tiebreaker.

Kansas City Wizards				Round	Chicago Fire			
1st place in Western Division: Pos. / Club / Pld. / W / L / D / Pts.; 1 / Kansas City Wizards (SS) / 32 / 16 / 7 / 9 / 57; 2 / Los Angeles Galaxy / 32 / 14 / 10 / 8 / 50; 3 / Colorado Rapids / 32 / 13 / 15 / 4 / 43; 4 / San Jose Earthquakes / 32 / 7 / 17 / 8 / 29; Source: MLS Qualified for playoffs Supporters' Shield winner				Regular season	1st place in Central Division: Pos. / Club / Pld. / W / L / D / Pts.; 1 / Chicago Fire / 32 / 17 / 9 / 6 / 57; 2 / Tampa Bay Mutiny / 32 / 16 / 12 / 4 / 52; 3 / Dallas Burn / 32 / 14 / 14 / 4 / 46; 4 / Columbus Crew / 32 / 11 / 16 / 5 / 38; Source: MLS Qualified for playoffs			
Opponent (Pts.)	1st leg	2nd leg	3rd leg	MLS Cup Playoffs	Opponent (Pts.)	1st leg	2nd leg	3rd leg
Colorado Rapids (7–1)	1–0 (H)	0–0 (A)	3–2 (H)	Quarterfinals	New England Revolution (6–3)	2–1 (H)	1–2 (A)	6–0 (H)
Los Angeles Galaxy (4–4) (1–0 SDET)	0–0 (H)	1–2 (ASDET) (A)	1–0 (SDET) (H)	Semifinals	MetroStars (6–3)	3–0 (H)	0–2 (A)	3–2 (H)

== Broadcasting ==
The MLS Cup final was broadcast in the United States on ABC with English commentary and Spanish via secondary audio programming. The English broadcast was led by play-by-play announcer Jack Edwards and color commentator Ty Keough, who were joined by studio hosts Rob Stone and Alexi Lalas. The Spanish broadcast comprised play-by-play announcer Roberto Abramowitz and MetroStars coach Octavio Zambrano as color commentator. The ABC broadcast drew a 1.0 national rating, matching the 1999 final. The local broadcast in the Kansas City area had an estimated 5 percent share of televisions, falling behind concurrent broadcasts of the film Blank Check and a Kansas City Chiefs game that drew 64 percent.

The match was also carried via streaming radio on Internetsoccer.com with English commentary from Dave Johnson and Miami Fusion coach Ray Hudson. Local radio stations in the Chicago area also broadcast the match, including WIND-AM in Spanish and WNVR-AM in Polish.

== Match ==
=== Summary ===
The match was played on a sunny day at RFK Stadium, which had 39,159 spectators; it was played at the same time as a home Washington Redskins game at nearby FedEx Field. The ceremonial pre-game coin toss was conducted by retired Dutch player and coach Johan Cruyff, who formerly played for the Washington Diplomats in the North American Soccer League. Both teams fielded their normal starting lineups despite reports of a slight concussion for Fire midfielder Jesse Marsch. Kansas City wore their blue home jerseys, while Chicago played in white.

The Wizards kicked off at 3:30 p.m. but were immediately dispossessed of the ball by the Fire, who quickly created a shot that forced Tony Meola to make his first save of the match. The ensuing corner kick was sent in by Hristo Stoichkov and converted into a bicycle kick by defender Tenywa Bonseu that went over the goal. Kansas City responded with two crosses into the penalty area in the following minute that were cleared without incident by the Chicago defense. A misplayed ball from Meola in the sixth minute gave Stoichkov a chance to score from 30 yards (27 m) on an empty goal, but he instead dribbled towards goal and was tackled by the Wizards defenders.

The opening goal was scored in the 11th minute by the Wizards, who used a long run along the right touchline by Chris Klein after he stole the ball from Diego Gutiérrez. Klein then sent a low cross into the box that deflected off Marsch to reach Miklos Molnar, whose second attempt at a shot lightly pushed the ball into the goal. Kansas City almost scored a second goal minutes later through a shot by Preki from outside the box that went over the crossbar. The Fire created several of their own chances to equalize through Stoichkov, but his shot in the 19th minute was high and a follow-up in the 25th minute hit the goalpost from 12 yards (11 m). Klein, who squandered a chance with only goalkeeper Zach Thornton in front of him, sent a cross to Mo Johnston, who missed a tap-in from close range in the 34th minute.

The first half ended with a 1–0 scoreline and six saves for Meola as the Wizards were outshot 16–5 by the Fire. Kansas City were immediately tested in the second half by Gutiérrez's cross into the box, which Piotr Nowak shot straight at Meola. The Fire were given room to counterattack while the Wizards focused on their defense; the second half was described as "more physical" and featured five yellow cards. In the 54th minute, a Stoichkov free kick was deflected by the Kansas City wall and bounced towards goal, where Gutiérrez attempted a shot from close range that hit the crossbar. Stoichkov was involved in the next chance minutes later as he fell in the penalty area while between Meola and Nick Garcia and unsuccessfully lobbied referee Paul Tamberino for a penalty.

On a rare Kansas City attack, Molnar received a long ball in the penalty area and made a shot that was deflected over the crossbar by Thoronton. It was followed by more close-range saves by Meola as the team withstood more Chicago attacks, particularly in the final ten minutes of regulation time. A slip pass by Ante Razov to Josh Wolff in the 82nd minute forced Meola to make a diving save; it was followed in the next minutes by Dema Kovalenko's shot at close range and Stoichkov's attempt. Meola maintained a shutout as the Wizards won 1–0 to clinch their first MLS Cup title; he was named MLS Cup MVP for his ten saves during the match, including several in the last minutes. The Wizards were outshot 22–6 by the Fire.

=== Details ===
October 15, 2000
3:30 p.m. EST

Kansas City Wizards	1–0	Chicago Fire
Molnar 11'	Report (Archived)

Robert F. Kennedy Memorial Stadium, Washington, D.C.
Attendance: 39,159
Referee: Paul Tamberino

GK	1	(United States) Tony Meola		(yellow card) 76'
RB	3	(United States) Nick Garcia		(yellow card) 58'
CB	6	(United States) Peter Vermes
LB	4	(United States) Brandon Prideaux
RM	17	(United States) Chris Klein (c)	(substituted off) 88'
CM	15	(United States) Kerry Zavagnin
CM	2	(United States) Matt McKeon
CM	11	(United States) Preki	(substituted off) 74'
LM	19	(United States) Chris Henderson
FW	10	(Scotland) Mo Johnston		(yellow card) 48'
FW	7	(Denmark) Miklos Molnar
Substitutes:
DF	20	(Nigeria) Uche Okafor	(substituted on) 74'
DF	21	(United States) Francisco Gomez	(substituted on) 88'
Manager:
(United States) Bob Gansler

GK	18	(United States) Zach Thornton
RB	15	(United States) Jesse Marsch	(substituted off) 59'
CB	2	(United States) C.J. Brown
CB	12	(United States) Carlos Bocanegra
LB	30	(Uganda) Tenywa Bonseu		(yellow card) 76'
RM	21	(Ukraine) Dema Kovalenko		(yellow card) 47'
CM	11	(United States) Diego Gutiérrez	(substituted off) 70'
CM	10	(Poland) Piotr Nowak (c)	(substituted off) 83'
LM	14	(United States) Chris Armas
CF	8	(Bulgaria) Hristo Stoichkov
CF	9	(United States) Ante Razov
Substitutes:
FW	16	(United States) Josh Wolff	(substituted on) 59'
MF	7	(United States) DaMarcus Beasley	(substituted on) 70'
MF	5	(Czech Republic) Luboš Kubík	(substituted on) 83'
Manager:
(United States) Bob Bradley

MLS Cup MVP:
Tony Meola (Kansas City Wizards)

Assistant referees:
Craig Lowry (United States)
George Vergara (United States)
Fourth official:
Kevin Stott (United States)

Match rules

- 90 minutes.
- 30 minutes of extra time if necessary.
- Penalty shootout if scores still level.
- Seven named substitutes.
- Maximum of three substitutions.

== Post-match ==
The Wizards became the third team to win the MLS Cup and the first from the Western Division. A trio of veteran Kansas City players—Molnar, Mo Johnston, and Alex Bunbury—announced their retirement from professional soccer after the final for unspecified reasons. Johnston, along with Preki and Uche Okafor, was an original member of the inaugural Wizards team who had stayed with the franchise. A public celebration for the team with 2,000 fans was held at Arrowhead Stadium on October 16 after their return from Washington, D.C.

It was the first championship for Lamar Hunt since the Kansas City Chiefs won Super Bowl IV in 1970. The replica MLS Cup trophy given to Kansas City remained in the possession of Hunt and his family until 2012, when it was returned to Sporting Kansas City (the rebranded Wizards). The 2000 title was the second for a professional soccer team from Kansas City, after the 1969 North American Soccer League title won by the Kansas City Spurs. The team hosted and won MLS Cup 2013, their second league championship, in a penalty shootout against Real Salt Lake.

The Fire described the match's result as disappointing, with Stotichkov calling it a "team loss—from the goalkeeper to me on top". The team returned to Chicago to train for another match the following week—the 2000 U.S. Open Cup final against the Miami Fusion, who had not played for two months. The Fire won 2–1 at Soldier Field and earned their second U.S. Open Cup title. Kansas City and Chicago were among the four MLS teams who qualified for the 2002 CONCACAF Champions' Cup, where the Wizards advanced to the semifinals before being eliminated by Monarcas Morelia.
