= Digital =

Digital usually refers to something using discrete digits, often binary digits.

== Businesses ==
- Digital bank, a form of financial institution
- Digital Equipment Corporation (DEC) or Digital, a computer company
- Digital Research (DR or DRI), a software company

== Computing and technology ==
=== Hardware ===
- Digital electronics, electronic circuits which operate using digital signals
  - Digital camera, which captures and stores digital images
    - Digital versus film photography
  - Digital computer, a computer that handles information represented by discrete values
  - Digital recording, information recorded using a digital signal

=== Socioeconomic phenomena ===
- Digital culture, the anthropological dimension of the digital social changes
- Digital divide, a form of economic and social inequality in access to or use of information and communication technologies
- Digital economy, an economy based on computing and telecommunications resources
- Digital rights, legal rights of access to computers or the Internet

=== Other uses in computing and technology ===
- Digital data, discrete data, usually represented using binary numbers
- Digital marketing, search engine and social media marketing
- Digital media, media stored as digital data
  - Digital radio, which uses digital technology to transmit or receive
  - Digital television, television systems which broadcast using digital signals
- Digital signal (electronics), signals formed from a discrete set of waveforms, rather than continuous ranges
- Digital signal (signal processing), sampled analog signals represented as a sequence of digital values

== Entertainment and media ==
=== Music ===
- Digital (album), by KRS-One
- "Digital" (Goldie song) (1998)
- "Digital" (Joy Division song) (1978)
- "Digital (Did You Tell)", a song by Stone Sour (2010)
- "Digital", a song by Alexandra Stan from Unlocked
- "Digital", a song by Imagine Dragons from Origins
- "Digital", a song by Soulja Boy from The DeAndre Way
- "Digital", a song by T-Pain from Three Ringz
- "Digitoll", a song by Coldrin from Optimize

=== Other media ===
- Digital: A Love Story (2010), an indie video game by Christine Love
- Digital painting, a method of creating visual art using computers

== Other uses ==
- Relating to the fingers
  - Digital exam, in proctology
- Digital Party, a political party in Uruguay
- Digital Playground Inc., an American independent pornographic film studio
- Vitalis Takawira or Digital, professional football player

== See also ==
- Digit (disambiguation)
- Digital download (disambiguation)
- Digital fingerprint (disambiguation)
- Binary code
- Boolean algebra
- Category:Digital media
