= Can You Dig It =

Can You Dig It may refer to:

- Can You Dig It? (album), a 2009 compilation album of music from Blaxploitation films
- Can You Dig It (The Mock Turtles song), a song by The Mock Turtles, 1991
- "Can U Dig It?", a song by Pop Will Eat Itself, 1989
- "C.U.D.I. (Can U Dig It)", a song by Cosmo's Midnight, 2019
- "Can You Dig It?", a song by the Beatles, a fragment of which was released as "Dig It" on the album Let It Be, 1970
- "Can You Dig It?", a song by the Monkees from Head, 1968
- "Can You Dig It", a song by MC Lyte from Act Like You Know, 1991

== See also ==
- Dig It (disambiguation)
