= Digit =

Digit may refer to:

== Mathematics and science ==
- Numerical digit, as used in mathematics or computer science
  - Western digits, the most common modern representation of numerical digits
- Digit (anatomy), the most distal part of a limb, such as a finger or toe
- Digit (unit), an ancient measurement unit
- Hartley (unit) or decimal digit, a unit of information entropy

== Personalities ==
- Digit, a gorilla studied by Dian Fossey, killed by poachers and buried near Fossey's grave
  - Digit Fund, now the Dian Fossey Gorilla Fund International, founded by Fossey to raise money for anti-poaching patrols

== Arts and media ==
- Digit (Cyberchase), a character in the TV series Cyberchase
- Digit (EP), by Echobelly, 2000
- Digit (magazine), an Indian information technology magazine
- Liquid and digits, a type of gestural, interpretive, rave and urban street dance

== Science and technology ==
- Digit, a humanoid robot created by Agility Robotics

== See also ==
- Dig It (disambiguation)
- Digital (disambiguation)
