= Mike Mekelburg =

American soccer player (born 1975)

Personal information
- Full name: Michael Mekelburg, Jr.
- Date of birth: February 20, 1975 (age 51)
- Place of birth: United States
- Height: 6 ft 1 in (1.85 m)
- Position: Midfielder

Youth career
- Black Watch SC

College career
| Years | Team | Apps | (Gls) |
| 1993–1996 | USF Bulls | | |

Senior career*
| Years | Team | Apps | (Gls) |
| 1997 | Tampa Bay Mutiny | 0 | (0) |
| 1997–1998 | Baltimore Spirit (indoor) | 3 | (0) |
| 1998 | Milwaukee Rampage | 17 | (4) |
| 1999 | Charleston Battery | 19 | (1) |
| 1999 | Raleigh Capital Express | 10 | (1) |
- * Club domestic league appearances and goals

Mike Mekelburg (born February 20, 1975) is an American retired soccer midfielder who played professionally in the USISL and National Professional Soccer League.

== Youth ==
Mekelburg grew up in Tampa, Florida, playing for Tampa's Black Watch S.C. In 1993, he graduated from George D. Chamberlain High School where he played on the boys' soccer team. In 1992, the Chamberlain soccer team finished runner-up to Killian in the Florida 4A high school soccer championship. Mekelburg attended the University of South Florida, playing for the men's soccer team from 1993 to 1996. He was a 1996 First Team All American.

== Professional ==
In December 1996, the Tampa Bay Terror selected Mekelburg in the National Professional Soccer League draft. In February 1997, the Tampa Bay Mutiny picked him in the first round (eighth overall) of the 1997 MLS College Draft. Mekelburg signed with the Mutiny, but injuries kept him off the field. The team waived him on June 24, 1997. In July, Dallas Sidekicks then chose Mekelburg in the Continental Indoor Soccer League Supplemental Draft after Mekelburg had trained with them for several weeks. The Sidekicks did not sign him and Mekelburg joined the Baltimore Spirit of the National Professional Soccer League in September 1997. In 1998, he played for the Milwaukee Rampage in the USISL A-League. On January 28, 1999, he signed a two-year contract with the Charleston Battery. On July 24, 1999, the Battery traded Mekelburg to the Raleigh Capital Express in exchange for Edmundo Rodriguez.
