= Gilmar (footballer, born 1970) =

Brazilian footballer

Personal information
- Full name: Gilmar Antônio Batista
- Date of birth: 16 May 1970 (age 56)
- Place of birth: São Paulo, Brazil
- Height: 1.85 m (6 ft 1 in)
- Position: Striker

Senior career*
Years	Team	Apps	(Gls)
1997–1998	Tampa Bay Mutiny	28	(11)
- São Caetano
2001	→ MetroStars (loan)	4	(0)
- * Club domestic league appearances and goals

Gilmar Antônio Batista (born 16 May 1970 in São Paulo) is a Brazilian retired professional association football player.

== Playing career ==
Gilmar was signed by MetroStars, on loan, as a replacement for Clint Mathis in 2001.

== Statistics ==
Club performance			League		Cup		League Cup		Continental		Total	
Season	Club	League	Apps	Goals	Apps	Goals	Apps	Goals	Apps	Goals	Apps	Goals
USA			League		Open Cup		League Cup		North America		Total	
1997	Tampa Bay Mutiny	MLS	16	8	0	0	0	0	0	0	16	8
1998	Tampa Bay Mutiny	MLS	12	3	0	0	0	0	0	0	12	3
Brazil			League		Copa do Brasil		League Cup		South America		Total	
?	São Caetano	?	-	-	-	-	-	-	-	-	-	-
USA			League		Open Cup		League Cup		North America		Total	
2001	MetroStars (loan)	MLS	4	0	0	0	0	0	0	0	4	0
Career total			0	0	0	0	0	0	0	0	0	0
