= 1997 Major League Soccer season =

2nd season of Major League Soccer

- Season: 1997
- Teams: 10
- MLS Cup: D.C. United (2nd title)
- Supporters' Shield: D.C. United (1st shield)
- CONCACAF Champions' Cup: D.C. United; Colorado Rapids
- Matches: 160
- Goals: 522 (3.26 per match)
- Top goalscorer: Jaime Moreno (16 goals)
- Longest winning run: Kansas City Wizards; Games: 7 (07/19 – 08/31)
- Longest losing run: New England Revolution; Games: 9 (07/20 – 09/12)
- Highest attendance: 57,407; NE 2–1 TB (April 20, 1997)
- Lowest attendance: 4,120; COL 1–0 DAL (April 23, 1997)
- Total attendance: 2,336,889
- Average attendance: 14,606

Locations of teams for the 1997 Major League Soccer season
Western Conference Eastern Conference

The 1997 Major League Soccer season was the second season of Major League Soccer. It was also the 85th season of FIFA-sanctioned soccer in the United States, and the 19th with a national first-division league.

Following the 1996 season, the Wiz changed names, becoming the Wizards, following legal action from electronics retailer The Wiz.

The regular season began on March 29, and concluded on September 28. The 1997 MLS Cup Playoffs began on October 4, and concluded with MLS Cup 1997 on October 26. D.C. United won their first Supporters' Shield and defended their MLS Cup championship becoming the first team to win back-to-back cups.

== Overview ==
=== Season format ===
The season began on March 22 and concluded with MLS Cup on October 26. The 10 teams were split evenly into two conferences. Each team played 32 games that were evenly divided between home and away. Each team played every other team in their conference four times, for a total of 16 games. The rest of the schedule consisted of three games against each team from the opposite conference, with four games against one designated team.

The top four teams from each conference qualified for the MLS Cup Playoffs. The conference semifinals and finals were played as a best-of-three series, and the winners advanced to MLS Cup. In all rounds, draws were broken by penalty shootout if necessary. The away goals rule was not used in any round.

The team with the most points in the regular season was awarded the MLS Supporters' Shield. The winner of MLS Cup, and the runner-up, qualified for the CONCACAF Champions' Cup.

=== Stadiums and locations ===
Team	Stadium	Capacity
Colorado Rapids	Mile High Stadium	76,273
Columbus Crew	Ohio Stadium	102,329
D.C. United	RFK Stadium	46,000
Dallas Burn	Cotton Bowl	92,100
Kansas City Wizards	Arrowhead Stadium	81,425
Los Angeles Galaxy	Rose Bowl	92,542
New England Revolution	Foxboro Stadium	60,292
NY/NJ MetroStars	Giants Stadium	80,200
San Jose Clash	Spartan Stadium	30,456
Tampa Bay Mutiny	Houlihan's Stadium	74,301

=== Personnel and sponsorships ===
Team	Head coach	Captain	Shirt sponsor
Colorado Rapids	(United States) Glenn Myernick		
Columbus Crew	(United States) Tom Fitzgerald	(Argentina) Marcelo Carrera	Snickers
D.C. United	(United States) Bruce Arena		MasterCard
Dallas Burn	(United States) Dave Dir		
Kansas City Wizards	(England) Ron Newman		—
Los Angeles Galaxy	(Ecuador) Octavio Zambrano		—
New England Revolution	(Netherlands) Thomas Rongen		—
NY/NJ MetroStars	(Brazil) Carlos Alberto Parreira	(United States) Tony Meola	Fujifilm
San Jose Clash	(Republic of Ireland) Brian Quinn	(United States) John Doyle	Honda
Tampa Bay Mutiny	(Poland) John Kowalski		

=== Coaching changes ===
Team	Outgoing coach	Manner of departure	Date of vacancy	Incoming coach	Date of appointment
Los Angeles Galaxy	(Germany) Lothar Osiander	Fired	June 10, 1997	(Ecuador) Octavio Zambrano	June 10, 1997
San Jose Clash	(England) Laurie Calloway	Fired	June 25, 1997	(Republic of Ireland) Brian Quinn	June 25, 1997

== Standings ==
=== Eastern Conference ===
Pos	Team	Pld	W	SOW	L	GF	GA	GD	Pts	Qualification
1	D.C. United	32	17	4	11	70	53	+17	55	MLS Cup Playoffs
2	Tampa Bay Mutiny	32	14	3	15	55	60	−5	45	MLS Cup Playoffs
3	Columbus Crew	32	12	3	17	42	41	+1	39	MLS Cup Playoffs
4	New England Revolution	32	11	4	17	40	53	−13	37	MLS Cup Playoffs
5	NY/NJ MetroStars	32	11	2	19	43	53	−10	35	

Source: MLS

=== Western Conference ===
Pos	Team	Pld	W	SOW	L	GF	GA	GD	Pts	Qualification
1	Kansas City Wizards	32	14	7	11	57	51	+6	49	MLS Cup Playoffs
2	Los Angeles Galaxy	32	14	2	16	55	44	+11	44	MLS Cup Playoffs
3	Dallas Burn	32	13	3	16	55	49	+6	42	MLS Cup Playoffs
4	Colorado Rapids	32	12	2	18	50	59	−9	38	MLS Cup Playoffs
5	San Jose Clash	32	9	3	20	55	59	−4	30	

Source: MLS

=== Overall standings ===
Pos	Team	Pld	W	SOW	L	GF	GA	GD	Pts	
1	D.C. United (C, S)	32	17	4	11	70	53	+17	55	Qualification for the CONCACAF Champions' Cup
2	Kansas City Wizards	32	14	7	11	57	51	+6	49	
3	Tampa Bay Mutiny	32	14	3	15	55	60	−5	45	
4	Los Angeles Galaxy	32	14	2	16	55	44	+11	44	
5	Dallas Burn	32	13	3	16	55	49	+6	42	
6	Columbus Crew	32	12	3	17	42	41	+1	39	
7	Colorado Rapids	32	12	2	18	50	59	−9	38	Qualification for the CONCACAF Champions' Cup
8	New England Revolution	32	11	4	17	40	53	−13	37	
9	NY/NJ MetroStars	32	11	2	19	43	53	−10	35	
10	San Jose Clash	32	9	3	20	55	59	−4	30	

Source: MLS
Rules for classification: 1) points; 2) head-to-head record; 3) goal difference; 4) number of goals scored
(C) MLS Cup champions; (S) Supporters' Shield winners

== MLS Cup playoffs ==
=== Bracket ===
- The ties were a best-of-three series.

Conference semifinals
1	D.C. United	4	1 (4)	x
4	New England Revolution	1	1 (3)	x
Eastern Conference
2	Tampa Bay Mutiny	1	0	x
3	Columbus Crew	2	2	x
1	Kansas City Wizards	0	2	x
4	Colorado Rapids	3	3	x
Western Conference
2	LA Galaxy	0 (0)	0	x
3	Dallas Burn	0 (2)	3	x

Conference finals
1	D.C. United	3	1	x
3	Columbus Crew	2	0	x
4	Colorado Rapids	1	2	x
3	Dallas Burn	0	1	x

MLS Cup
1	D.C. United	2
4	Colorado Rapids	1

=== Conference semifinals ===
Eastern Conference

October 5, 1997
Game 1

D.C. United	4–1	New England Revolution
Wegerle 13', 56'; Moreno 65', 76'	Report	Burns 89'

RFK Stadium, Washington, D.C.
Attendance: 12,540
Referee: Tim Weyland
October 8, 1997
Game 2

New England Revolution	1–1	D.C. United
Moore 72'	Report	Williams 53'
Penalties
Moore (penalty scored); Burns (penalty scored); Chronopoulos (penalty scored); Galderisi (penalty missed); Naveda (penalty missed); Keegan (penalty missed); McKinley (penalty missed)	3–4	(penalty scored) Etcheverry; (penalty scored) Moreno; (penalty scored) Kelderman; (penalty missed) Agoos; (penalty missed) Iroha; (penalty missed) Harkes; (penalty scored) Llamosa

Foxboro Stadium, Foxborough, Massachusetts
Attendance: 16,233
- D.C. United advance to the Conference Finals.

October 5, 1997
Game 1

Tampa Bay Mutiny	1–2	Columbus Crew
Gilmar 35'	Report	Farrell 11'; Wood 83'

Houlihan's Stadium, Tampa, Florida
Attendance: 8,272
Referee: Noel Kenny
October 8, 1997
Game 2

Columbus Crew	2–0	Tampa Bay Mutiny
McBride 43'; Warzycha 73'	Report

Ohio Stadium, Columbus, Ohio
Attendance: 13,102
Referee: Joshua Patlak
- Columbus Crew advance to the Conference Finals.

Western Conference

October 5, 1997
Game 1

Los Angeles Galaxy	0–0	Dallas Burn
	Report
Penalties
Karapetyan (penalty missed); Armas (penalty missed); Machón (penalty missed); Vanney (penalty missed)	0–2	(penalty scored) Sutter; (penalty missed) Soehn; (penalty missed) Santel; (penalty scored) Álvarez

Rose Bowl, Pasadena, California
Attendance: 18,921
Referee: Kevin Stott
October 8, 1997
Game 2

Dallas Burn	3–0	Los Angeles Galaxy
Washington 29', 69'; Peinado 86'	Report

Cotton Bowl, Dallas, Texas
Attendance: 11,248
Referee: Esse Baharmast
- Dallas Burn advance to the Conference Finals.

October 4, 1997
Game 1

Kansas City Wizards	0–3	Colorado Rapids
	Report	C. Henderson 25'; Bravo 67'; Paule 75'

Arrowhead Stadium, Kansas City, Missouri
Attendance: 10,174
Referee: Brian Hall
October 8, 1997
Game 2

Colorado Rapids	3–2	Kansas City Wizards
Bravo 16', 68'; Harris 83'	Report	Takawira 9'; Preki 88'

Mile High Stadium, Denver, Colorado
Attendance: 13,117
Referee: Paul Tamberino
- Colorado Rapids advance to the Conference Finals.

=== Conference finals ===
Western Conference

October 12, 1997
Game 1

Dallas Burn	0–1	Colorado Rapids
	Report	S. Henderson 42'

Cotton Bowl, Dallas, Texas
Attendance: 7,376
Referee: Kevin Stott
October 15, 1997
Game 2

Colorado Rapids	2–1	Dallas Burn
Patiño 22'; C. Henderson 87'	Report	Álvarez 5'

Mile High Stadium, Denver, Colorado
Attendance: 18,452
Referee: Noel Kenny
- Colorado Rapids advance to MLS Cup.

Eastern Conference

October 12, 1997
Game 1

D.C. United	3–2	Columbus Crew
Sanneh 9', 45'; Díaz Arce 29'	Report	Farrell 57'; Dooley 73'

RFK Stadium, Washington, D.C.
Attendance: 11,820
Referee: Kevin Terry
October 15, 1997
Game 2

Columbus Crew	0–1	D.C. United
	Report	Díaz Arce 47'

Ohio Stadium, Columbus, Ohio
Attendance: 9,506
Referee: Arturo Angeles
- D.C. United advance to MLS Cup.

=== MLS Cup ===
October 26, 1997

D.C. United	2–1	Colorado Rapids
Moreno 37'; Sanneh 68'	Report	Paz 75'

RFK Stadium, Washington, D.C.
Attendance: 57,431
Referee: Brian Hall

== Player statistics ==
=== Goals ===
Rank	Player	Club	Goals
1	(Bolivia) Jaime Moreno	D.C. United	16
2	(El Salvador) Raúl Díaz Arce	D.C. United	15
3	(Venezuela) Giovanni Savarese	NY/NJ MetroStars	14
4	(United States) Preki	Kansas City Wizards	12
4	(El Salvador) Ronald Cerritos	San Jose Clash	12
4	(United States) Dante Washington	Dallas Burn	12
7	(Mexico) Damián Álvarez	Dallas Burn	11
7	(Brazil) Wélton	Los Angeles Galaxy	11
9	(United States) Jeff Baicher	San Jose Clash	10
9	(United States) Mark Chung	Kansas City Wizards	10
9	(United States) Roy Lassiter	Tampa Bay Mutiny	10
9	(United States) Lawrence Lozzano	San Jose Clash	10

=== Hat-tricks ===
Player	Club	Against	Result	Date
(El Salvador) Raúl Díaz Arce^{4}	D.C. United	Colorado Rapids	5–2	April 12
(Argentina) Alberto Naveda	New England Revolution	NY/NJ MetroStars	3–1	May 30
(United States) Dante Washington	Dallas Burn	San Jose Clash	3–1	July 18
(Ecuador) Eduardo Hurtado	Los Angeles Galaxy	Tampa Bay Mutiny	6–1	September 7
(El Salvador) Jose Vasquez	Los Angeles Galaxy	San Jose Clash	3–2	September 21

=== Assists ===
Rank	Player	Club	Assists
1	(Colombia) Carlos Valderrama	Tampa Bay Mutiny	15
2	(United States) Preki	Kansas City Wizards	12
2	(United States) Eddie Lewis	San Jose Clash	12
4	(United States) Chris Henderson	Colorado Rapids	9
4	(El Salvador) Mauricio Cienfuegos	Los Angeles Galaxy	9
6	(United States) Lawrence Lozzano	San Jose Clash	8
6	(United States) Steve Ralston	Tampa Bay Mutiny	8
6	(United States) Eric Wynalda	San Jose Clash	8
6	(Uruguay) Adrián Paz	Colorado Rapids	8
6	(United States) Miles Joseph	NY/NJ MetroStars	8

=== Clean sheets ===
Rank	Player	Club	Clean sheets
1	(United States) Brad Friedel	Columbus Crew	7
2	(Italy) Walter Zenga	New England Revolution	6
3	(United States) Mike Ammann	Kansas City Wizards	5
3	(United States) Marcus Hahnemann	Colorado Rapids	5
3	(United States) Tony Meola	NY/NJ MetroStars	5
6	(Mexico) Jorge Campos	Los Angeles Galaxy	4
7	(United States) Mark Dodd	Dallas Burn	3
7	(United States) Mark Dougherty	Tampa Bay Mutiny	3
7	(United States) Kevin Hartman	Los Angeles Galaxy	3
7	(United States) Mark Simpson	D.C. United	3

== Awards ==
=== Individual awards ===
Award	Player	Club
Most Valuable Player	(United States) Preki	Kansas City Wizards
Defender of the Year	(United States) Eddie Pope	D.C. United
Goalkeeper of the Year	(United States) Brad Friedel	Columbus Crew
Coach of the Year	(United States) Bruce Arena	D.C. United
Rookie of the Year	(United States) Mike Duhaney	Tampa Bay Mutiny
Scoring Champion	(United States) Preki	Kansas City Wizards
Goal of the Year	(Bolivia) Marco Etcheverry	D.C. United
Fair Play Award	(United States) Mark Chung	Kansas City Wizards

=== Best XI ===
Goalkeeper	Defenders	Midfielders	Forwards
(United States) Brad Friedel, Columbus	(United States) Jeff Agoos, D.C. United (United States) Thomas Dooley, Columbus (Scotland) Richard Gough, Kansas City (United States) Eddie Pope, D.C. United	(United States) Mark Chung, Kansas City (Bolivia) Marco Etcheverry, D.C. United (United States) Preki, Kansas City (Colombia) Carlos Valderrama, Tampa Bay	(El Salvador) Ronald Cerritos, San Jose (Bolivia) Jaime Moreno, D.C. United

=== Player of the Month ===
Month	Player	Club
April	(Bolivia) Jaime Moreno	D.C. United
May	(Switzerland) Alain Sutter	Dallas Burn
June	(United States) John Harkes	D.C. United
July	(Brazil) Wélton	Los Angeles Galaxy
August	(United States) Brad Friedel	Columbus Crew
September	(Italy) Walter Zenga	New England Revolution

=== Weekly awards ===
Player of the Week
Week	Player	Club
Week 1	(United States) Dave Salzwedel	San Jose Clash
Week 2	(Italy) Giuseppe Galderisi	Tampa Bay Mutiny
Week 3	(Colombia) Carlos Valderrama	Tampa Bay Mutiny
Week 4	(El Salvador) Raúl Díaz Arce	D.C. United
Week 5	(United States) Dante Washington	Dallas Burn
Week 6	(Italy) Roberto Donadoni	NY/NJ MetroStars
Week 7	(South Africa) Doctor Khumalo	Columbus Crew
Week 8	(Argentina) Damian Alvarez	Dallas Burn
Week 9	(Mozambique) Chiquinho Conde	New England Revolution
Week 10	(United States) Preki Radosavljević	Kansas City Wizards
Week 11	(United States) Eric Wynalda	San Jose Clash
Week 12	(United States) Preki Radosavljević	Kansas City Wizards
Week 13	(Brazil) Gilmar	Tampa Bay Mutiny
Week 14	(United States) Paul Bravo	Colorado Rapids
Week 15	(United States) Tab Ramos	NY/NJ MetroStars
Week 16	(United States) Dante Washington	Dallas Burn
Week 17	(Colombia) Antony de Ávila	NY/NJ MetroStars
Week 18	(Brazil) Gilmar	Tampa Bay Mutiny
Week 19	(Jamaica) Wolde Harris	Colorado Rapids
Week 20	(United States) Thomas Dooley	Columbus Crew
Week 21	(Venezuela) Giovanni Savarese	NY/NJ MetroStars
Week 22	(Bolivia) Marco Etcheverry	D.C. United
Week 23	(Ecuador) Eduardo Hurtado	Los Angeles Galaxy
Week 24	(United States) Cobi Jones	Los Angeles Galaxy
Week 25	(United States) Martín Vásquez	Tampa Bay Mutiny
Week 26	(United States) Marcelo Balboa	Colorado Rapids

== Attendance ==
Rank	Team	GP	Cumulative	High	Low	Mean
1	New England Revolution	16	340,762	57,407	10,242	21,298
2	Los Angeles Galaxy	16	330,015	53,147	7,232	20,626
3	NY/NJ MetroStars	16	270,288	26,322	10,510	16,893
4	D.C. United	16	267,171	28,749	9,675	16,698
5	Columbus Crew	16	240,650	22,259	10,662	15,041
6	San Jose Clash	16	217,546	23,501	7,955	13,597
7	Colorado Rapids	16	189,355	36,252	4,120	11,835
8	Tampa Bay Mutiny	16	181,322	18,070	6,984	11,333
9	Dallas Burn	16	154,845	16,089	4,451	9,678
10	Kansas City Wizards	16	144,935	12,485	6,272	9,058
Total		160	2,336,889	57,407	4,120	14,606
