= Cesar Delgado (footballer, born 1977) =

Mexican footballer

Personal information
- Full name: Cesar Delgado Rios
- Date of birth: 16 January 1977 (age 49)
- Place of birth: Guadalajara, Mexico
- Height: 6 ft 0 in (1.83 m)
- Position: Goalkeeper

College career
Years	Team	Apps	(Gls)
1995–1996	Yavapai Roughriders	36	(0)

Senior career*
Years	Team	Apps	(Gls)
1998	Arizona Sahuaros		
1999	Kansas City Wizards	1	(0)
2001	Arizona Sahuaros	4	(0)
Total		5	(0)
- * Club domestic league appearances and goals

Cesar Delgado Rios (born 16 January 1977) is a former Mexican footballer who played for Kansas City Wizards in the MLS. He was waived after playing in one game: a 4–0 away loss at Dallas Burn. Very little information is known about Delgado. He was signed by the Wizards following both of their goalkeepers sustaining injuries before the 1999 season. In the first game of the MLS season, he started, making 4 saves but allowing 4 goals in a 0–4 loss. The next day in training, it is reported that he didn't train with the team because he had to watch tape of the game for all of training. He was waived soon after. Information beyond this is hard to come by and even as much as his jersey number in the game that he played in is unsure but is assumed to be 1. He wore number 30 in the game. It is known that he attended and played college soccer for Yavapai College.

== Career statistics ==
=== Club ===
Club	Season	League			Cup		Other		Total	
Club	Season	Division	Apps	Goals	Apps	Goals	Apps	Goals	Apps	Goals
Kansas City Wizards	1999	MLS	1	0	0	0	0	0	1	0
Arizona Sahuaros	2001	USL2	4	0	0	0	0	0	4	0
Career total			5	0	0	0	0	0	5	0
