= Digital fingerprint =

Digital fingerprint may refer to:

- Message digest, the output of a one-way function when applied to a stream of data
  - Public key fingerprint, short sequence of bytes used to identify a longer public key
- Fingerprint (computing)
  - Acoustic fingerprint, a condensed digital summary generated from an audio signal
  - Device fingerprint, a compact summary of software and hardware settings collected from a remote device, for example a computer or a web browser
  - Digital video fingerprinting, a technique to summarize characteristic components of a video recording
  - TCP/IP stack fingerprinting, the remote detection of the characteristics of a TCP/IP stack
  - Content ID, a Google technology used on YouTube to identify content protected by copyright
