= Edmundo Rodriguez =

Mexican footballer (born 1970)

Eddie Rodriguez
Personal information
- Full name: Edmundo Rodriguez
- Date of birth: April 22, 1970 (age 56)
- Place of birth: Guadalajara, Mexico
- Height: 6 ft 4 in (1.93 m)
- Positions: Midfielder; defender

College career
Years	Team	Apps	(Gls)
1991–1992	New Mexico Lobos		

Senior career*
Years	Team	Apps	(Gls)
- Chivas
- Tecos
1995	Arizona Sandsharks (indoor)	23	(4)
1995–1996	Tampa Bay Terror (indoor)	14	(4)
1996	MetroStars	11	(0)
1996	Sacramento Knights (indoor)	2	(0)
1996–1997	Tampa Bay Terror (indoor)	16	(1)
1997	Kansas City Wizards	16	(1)
1997	→ Albuquerque Geckos (loan)		(2)
1998	Hershey Wildcats	10	(0)
1998–1999	Raleigh Flyers		
1999	Charleston Battery	15	(1)
1999–2001	Harrisburg Heat (indoor)	59	(19)
2000	Raleigh Capital Express	20	(1)
2001	Atlanta Silverbacks	24	(4)

Managerial career
- Tampa Spartans (women's assistant)
- * Club domestic league appearances and goals

Edmundo "Eddie" Rodriguez (born April 22, 1970) is a Mexican retired soccer player. He spent most of his career in the U.S. leagues including two seasons in Major League Soccer. He has also served as an assistant coach with the University of Tampa women's soccer team.

== Youth ==
Rodriguez spent his youth in Guadalajara before moving to the United States with his family when he was fourteen. In 1991, he entered the University of New Mexico, where he played soccer in 1991 and 1992. In his two seasons with the Lobos, he scored twenty goals in twenty-seven games. In 1992, he was the MPSF Pacific Division MPV and a first team All-American. he also set the single season goals record and UNM as well as the point leader in school history

== Professional ==
In 1993, Rodriguez moved back to Mexico, where he played in the Mexican first and second divisions with Chivas and Tecos. In the summer of 1995, he returned to the United States and signed with the Arizona Sandsharks of the Continental Indoor Soccer League. That fall, he moved to the Tampa Bay Terror for the 1995–1996 National Professional Soccer League. In February 1996, the MetroStars selected Rodriguez in the first round (second overall) of the 1996 MLS Supplemental Draft. He assisted on the first goal in MetroStars’ history, but never scored a goal or added an assist before being released after eleven games. He returned to the Terror for the 1996–1997 season. In February 1997, the San Jose Clash picked up Rodriguez in the third round (24th overall) in the 1997 MLS Supplemental Draft. The Clash waived him in March. He then signed with the Kansas City Wizards. Although Rodriguez had begun in the midfield, he moved to backline with the Wizards. He played sixteen games, scoring one goal. The Wizards also sent him on loan to the Albuquerque Geckos. The Wizards waived him in April 1998. He unsuccessfully attempted to sign with the Tampa Bay Mutiny and ended up playing for the Raleigh Flyers of the USISL that season. In July 1999, the Express traded Rodriguez to the Charleston Battery in exchange for Mike Mekelburg. He played fifteen games for the Battery. In the fall of 1999, he returned to the NPSL, this time with the Harrisburg Heat. He would play the next two winter indoor seasons in Harrisburg. On May 9, 2000, he returned to Raleigh, now to play for the Raleigh Capital Express. In April 2001, he moved to the Atlanta Silverbacks. He may have also played for the Jacksonville Cyclones in the USISL.

== Coach ==
Rodriguez has spent some time as an assistant coach with the University of Tampa women's soccer team.
