= Michael Green (soccer, born 1978) =

American soccer player

Personal information
- Date of birth: July 16, 1978 (age 48)
- Place of birth: Columbia, Maryland, U.S.
- Position: Defender

College career
Years	Team	Apps	(Gls)
1996–1998	Virginia Cavaliers	55	(2)

Senior career*
Years	Team	Apps	(Gls)
1999–2001	Kansas City Wizards	3	(0)
1999	→ MLS Pro-40 (loan)	2	(0)
2000	→ MLS Pro-40 (loan)	20	(0)
2001–2003	Pittsburgh Riverhounds	52	(3)
2004	Charleston Battery	8	(2)
Total		85	(5)
- * Club domestic league appearances and goals

Michael Green (born July 16, 1978) is an American former soccer player who played for Kansas City Wizards in the MLS.

== Career statistics ==
=== Club ===
Club	Season	League			Cup		Other		Total	
Club	Season	Division	Apps	Goals	Apps	Goals	Apps	Goals	Apps	Goals
Kansas City Wizards	1999	MLS	0	0	0	0	0	0	0	0
Kansas City Wizards	2000	MLS	0	0	0	0	0	0	0	0
Kansas City Wizards	2001	MLS	3	0	0	0	0	0	3	0
Kansas City Wizards	Total		3	0	0	0	0	0	3	0
MLS Pro-40 (loan)	1999	USL A-League	2	0	0	0	0	0	2	0
MLS Pro-40 (loan)	2000	USL A-League	20	0	0	0	0	0	20	0
MLS Pro-40 (loan)	Total		22	0	0	0	0	0	22	0
Pittsburgh Riverhounds	2001	USL A-League	9	1	0	0	0	0	9	1
Pittsburgh Riverhounds	2002	USL A-League	22	0	0	0	0	0	22	0
Pittsburgh Riverhounds	2003	USL A-League	21	2	0	0	0	0	21	2
Pittsburgh Riverhounds	Total		52	3	0	0	0	0	52	3
Charleston Battery	2004	USL A-League	8	2	0	0	0	0	8	2
Career total			85	5	0	0	0	0	85	5
