= Sean Henderson =

American soccer player

Personal information
- Date of birth: July 25, 1972 (age 54)
- Place of birth: Everett, Washington, U.S.
- Height: 6 ft 0 in (1.83 m)
- Position: Midfielder

Youth career
- 1990–1993: UCLA Bruins

Senior career*
| Years | Team | Apps | (Gls) |
| 1994 | East Los Angeles Cobras | | |
| 1994–1996 | TuS Celle | 23 | (1) |
| 1996–1998 | Colorado Rapids | 55 | (4) |
| 1999–2004 | Seattle Sounders | 78 | (5) |

International career
| | United States U20 | 5 | (0) |
- * Club domestic league appearances and goals

Sean Henderson (born July 25, 1972) is an American retired soccer midfielder who spent two seasons in Germany, three in Major League Soccer and five in the USL A-League. He is now the scouting director for Seattle Sounders FC.

== Player ==
=== Youth ===
Henderson, younger brother to Chris Henderson, was born and raised in Everett, Washington, attending Cascade High School where he was a two-time high school All American and helped the Bruins win the state championship in 1987 and 1989. After high school, he attended UCLA where he played from 1990 to 1993. In his first year at UCLA, they won the NCAA National Championship. In 1993, he was named captain, selected as an All American and was voted as the team Offensive MVP. In 1991, Henderson was a member of the North Huntington Beach Untouchables that won the U19 National Championship.

=== Professional ===
In 1994, Henderson turned professional with the East Los Angeles Cobras in the USISL. That fall, he moved to Germany and signed with Regionalliga club TuS Celle. In 1996, he returned to the United States and signed with the Colorado Rapids of Major League Soccer, playing alongside his brother. In 1997, the Rapids went to the MLS championship game where it lost to D.C. United. San Jose Earthquakes picked up Henderson in the waiver draft but failed to earn a roster spot for the 1999 season. He appears in the 99 media guide and program until June 1999. On June 30, 1999, Henderson moved to the second division Seattle Sounders of the USL A-League. He played there until retiring from professional soccer in 2005.

=== U-20 National Team ===
Henderson made five appearances with the United States U-20 men's national soccer team.

== Coach ==
Henderson joined Crossfire Premier, a youth club based in Redmond, Washington, in 1999. Henderson joined the Seattle Sounders FC Academy for their inaugural season in 2010. After 8 years as an academy coach he became the Director of Scouting for Sounders in 2018. Henderson holds his US Soccer A License and the Elite Formation License from the French Soccer Federation

== Honors ==
Henderson was inducted into the Cascade High School Hall of Fame in 2012 as well as the Snohomish County Sports Hall of Fame in 2020 and again in 2023 (as part of the 1987 State Championship Boys Soccer team).
