= Matt McKeon =

American retired soccer midfielder (born 1974)

Personal information
- Full name: Matthew John McKeon
- Date of birth: September 24, 1974 (age 52)
- Place of birth: St. Louis, Missouri, United States
- Height: 6 ft 2 in (1.88 m)
- Position: Midfielder

College career
Years	Team	Apps	(Gls)
1992–1995	St. Louis Billikens		

Senior career*
Years	Team	Apps	(Gls)
1996–1998	Kansas City Wizards	65	(4)
1999	Colorado Rapids	28	(0)
2000–2002	Kansas City Wizards	79	(9)

International career
1999	United States	2	(0)
- * Club domestic league appearances and goals

Matthew John McKeon (born September 24, 1974) is an American retired soccer midfielder who played seven seasons in Major League Soccer. He earned two caps with the United States men's national soccer team and was a member of the 1996 U.S. Olympic soccer team.

== Youth ==
McKeon was born in St. Louis, Missouri. McKeon graduated from De Smet Jesuit High School where he was a Parade Magazine High School All American soccer player his senior season. He was also the 1992 Gatorade Boys Soccer Player of the Year. A product of Saint Louis University, where he was a 1994 and 1995 First Team All-American. In 1996, the Missouri Athletic Club awarded him the Hermann Trophy.

McKeon is one of 22 college players to be part of the 40-40 club, having both 40 goals and 40 assists in their college career.

== Professional ==
On March 4, 1996, McKeon was the first pick in the 1996 MLS College Draft, going to the Kansas City Wizards. He was known as a tough defender, and led the league in fouls committed during the 1997 season. The Wizards traded him to the Colorado Rapids for Chris Henderson in November 1998. A year later, the Rapids traded him and Peter Vermes to the Wizards for Scott Vermillion, an allocation, and an exchange of draft picks. McKeon was a "salary cap casualty" in the 02/03 offseason, being cut from the team despite strong play. In seven seasons in MLS, McKeon scored 13 goals and 19 assists in league play.

== International ==
McKeon earned two caps with the United States national team, both at the 1999 Confederations Cup, his first coming on July 30 against Germany. He also played at the 1996 Summer Olympics.

McKeon currently is the boys youth director of soccer and coaches several teams for Sporting JB Marine Soccer Club in St. Louis.

== Honors ==
Individual

- MLS All-Star: 2000
