= Digital download =

Digital download may refer to:

- Downloading, the processing of copying data to a computer from an external source
- Digital distribution, a method of downloading software or audio-visual media as opposed to buying it at a traditional point of sale
  - Music download, a specific type of digital distribution
  - Downloadable content (DLC), downloadable media usually for a video game
  - Digital distribution of video games, the process of delivering video game content in a digital way
