= Dig It =

Dig It may refer to:

- Dig It (Klaus Schulze album), 1980
- Dig It!, a 1958 jazz album by The Red Garland Quintet
- Dig-It (Lee Konitz and Ted Brown album), recorded in 1996 and released in 1999
- "Dig It" (Beatles song), 1970
- "Dig It" (Skinny Puppy song), 1986
- "Dig It", a 2024 song by Bring Me The Horizon from their album Post Human: Nex Gen
- Dig It (manga), a 2025 manga series by Yoshidamaru
