= Nino Da Silva =

Brazilian footballer

Personal information
- Full name: Nino Da Silva
- Date of birth: 26 May 1979 (age 47)
- Place of birth: Santos, São Paulo, Brazil
- Height: 5 ft 9 in (1.75 m)
- Position: Striker

Senior career*
Years	Team	Apps	(Gls)
1997–1999	Kansas City Wizards	10	(0)
1997	→ Orlando Sundogs (loan)	5	(1)
1998	→ MLS Pro-40 (loan)	11	(3)
1999	→ MLS Pro-40 (loan)	7	(2)
2000	MetroStars	3	(0)
Total		36	(6)
- * Club domestic league appearances and goals

Nino Da Silva (born 26 May 1979 in Santos, São Paulo) is a Brazilian former professional footballer.

== Early life ==
Nino was born in Brazil to Nilton Da Silva, a former professional indoor soccer player. Attended St. Viator Catholic High School in Arlington Heights, Illinois. Was teammates with Walter Payton's son Jarrett Payton, Eric Peterson, and John Valentino at St. Viator. Led St. Viator to a 3rd place State finish his senior year. A standout American high school soccer player, Nino was two-time National Player of the Year in 1996 and 1997.

== Acting ==
In 2005, Da Silva played the part of Eddie Souza in The Game of Their Lives, a movie about the U.S. victory over England in the 1950 FIFA World Cup.

== Statistics ==
Club performance			League		Cup		League Cup		Continental		Total	
Season	Club	League	Apps	Goals	Apps	Goals	Apps	Goals	Apps	Goals	Apps	Goals
USA			League		Open Cup		League Cup		North America		Total	
1997	Kansas City Wizards	MLS	1	0	0	0	0	0	0	0	1	0
1998	Kansas City Wizards	MLS	1	0	0	0	0	0	0	0	1	0
1999	Kansas City Wizards	MLS	8	0	0	0	0	0	0	0	8	0
2000	MetroStars	MLS	3	0	0	0	0	0	0	0	3	0
Career total			13	0	0	0	0	0	0	0	13	0
