= Brian Johnson (soccer) =

American soccer player and coach

Personal information
- Date of birth: March 7, 1974 (age 52)
- Place of birth: Carmichael, California, U.S.
- Height: 5 ft 7 in (1.70 m)
- Position: Midfielder

College career
| Years | Team | Apps | (Gls) |
| 1992–1996 | Fresno State Bulldogs | | |

Senior career*
| Years | Team | Apps | (Gls) |
| 1997–2001 | Kansas City Wizards | 67 | (1) |
| 1997 | → Sacramento Scorpions (loan) | | |
| 1997 | → Nashville Metros (loan) | 6 | (0) |
| 1998 | → MLS Pro 40 (loan) | 6 | (0) |
| 2001 | → Pittsburgh Riverhounds (loan) | 10 | (1) |
| 2002 | Pittsburgh Riverhounds | 22 | (0) |

International career
| 1990–1993 | United States U20 | | |

Managerial career
- 2003–2004: Ohio State Buckeyes (assistant)
- 2005–2009: Real Salt Lake (assistant)
- 2010: West Virginia Mountaineers (assistant)
- 2021–: Tampa Bay United
- * Club domestic league appearances and goals

Brian "B.J." Johnson (born March 7, 1974) is an American retired soccer midfielder who spent five seasons in Major League Soccer with the Kansas City Wizards. He is currently the Sporting Director and MLS NEXT Homegrown Division Under 19 head coach for Tampa Bay United Soccer Club.

== Playing career ==
In 1992, Johnson graduated from Granada High School in Livermore, California. He attended the Fresno State University, playing on the men's soccer team from 1992 to 1996. He spent the 1995 season training with the U.S. Olympic soccer team. In 1996, he returned to Fresno State where he was a 1996 Third Team All American. Johnson completed his degree and graduated from Excelsior College in 2004. In 1993, he played for the United States U-20 men's national soccer team at the 1993 FIFA World Youth Championship. In February 1997, the Kansas City Wizards selected Johnson in the first round (seventh overall) of the 1997 MLS College Draft. The Wizards sent him on loan to the Nashville Metros for the first half of the season. He returned to the Wizards in July and saw limited playing time through the end of the season. He had become a regular by 2000 when the Wizards won the 2000 MLS Cup. His playing time rapidly dwindled in 2001 and he went on loan to the Pittsburgh Riverhounds of the USL A-League. The Wizards released Johnson at the end of the season and he signed with the Riverhound where he finished his career in 2002.

== Coaching career ==
In 2003, Ohio State University hired Johnson as an assistant with its men's soccer team. In January 2005, he moved to Real Salt Lake of Major League Soccer as an assistant coach. In 2010, he left Real Salt Lake to become an assistant with the West Virginia Mountaineers.

== Personal life ==
Johnson is the father of professional soccer player Tate Johnson.
