= Uche Okafor =

Nigerian footballer (1967–2011)

Personal information
- Full name: Uchenna Kizito Okafor
- Date of birth: 8 August 1967
- Place of birth: Owerri, Nigeria
- Date of death: 6 January 2011 (aged 43)
- Place of death: Little Elm, Texas, United States
- Height: 1.90 m (6 ft 3 in)
- Position: Defender

Senior career*
Years	Team	Apps	(Gls)
1986–1988	ACB Lagos	?	(?)
1988–1991	KRC Mechelen	?	(?)
1991–1992	UR Namur	?	(?)
1992–1993	Le Touquet AC	?	(?)
1993–1994	Hannover 96	4	(0)
1994	União de Leiria	0	(0)
1995	Ironi Ashdod	13	(0)
1995–1996	Farense	0	(0)
1996–2000	Kansas City Wizards	109	(3)

International career
1988–1998	Nigeria	34	(0)
- * Club domestic league appearances and goals

Uchenna Kizito Okafor //, often shortened to Uche Okafor (8 August 1967 – 6 January 2011) was a Nigerian professional footballer who played as a defender. He made 34 international appearances for the Nigeria national team.

== Club career ==
Okafor's club career took him to many countries before he settled in the USA. Okafor was drafted to Kansas City Wizards in the ninth round of the 1996 MLS Inaugural Player Draft, and played there for five seasons before retiring after the 2000 season.

== International career ==
Okafor played every match when Nigeria won the 1994 African Cup of Nations, but sustained an ankle injury shortly thereafter. He was part of the squad to the 1994 World Cup but did not get any playing time. He played one out of their four games in the 1998 World Cup, though, as well as at the 1988 Olympics.

== Post-playing career ==
Okafor coached for the Associated Soccer Group, a member of the North Texas Soccer Association. He was head coach for the 91 Gold Central boys team and the 93 HP Central boys team who play in the Plano Premier Select Soccer league.

Okafor was a regular pundit on African football on ESPN's coverage and their PressPass programme.

== Death ==
Okafor's body was discovered by his wife in January 2011 shortly after he returned home from dropping off his daughter in school in their house in Little Elm, a town about 30 miles northwest of Dallas. The Tarrant County Medical Examiner's Office said that he hanged himself in an upstairs hallway. Okafor's family rejected the suicide ruling of the Little Elm Police Department, suspecting foul play.

Kent Babb, reporter for the Kansas City Star, published an in-depth analysis of Uche's death on 19 May 2012.

== Honours ==
Kansas City Wizards

- MLS All-Star, 1998
- MLS Cup: 2000
- Supporters' Shield: 2000
