= Jake Dancy =

American soccer player

Personal information
- Date of birth: April 9, 1978 (age 48)
- Place of birth: Diamond Bar, California, U.S.
- Height: 5 ft 10 in (1.78 m)
- Position: Defender

College career
Years	Team	Apps	(Gls)
1996	Fresno State Bulldogs	20	(1)

Senior career*
Years	Team	Apps	(Gls)
1997	Orange County Zodiac	15	(2)
1997–1999	Kansas City Wizards	19	(0)
1998	→ Hershey Wildcats (loan)	3	(1)
2000	Orange County Zodiac	28	(1)
2000–2003	Kansas City Attack/Comets (indoor)	70	(12)
2001	Connecticut Wolves	13	(1)
2004	Kansas City Comets (indoor)	16	(4)
2007–2008	Orlando Sharks (indoor)	2	(0)
Total		166	(20)

Managerial career
- 2007–2008: Orlando Sharks
- * Club domestic league appearances and goals

Jake Dancy is an American retired soccer defender who played professionally in Major League Soccer, the USL A-League and the second Major Indoor Soccer League. He also coached one season in the second MISL.

== Player ==
=== College ===
In 1996, Dancy attended Fresno State University where he played twenty games, scoring one goal with a team that went to the NCAA quarterfinals. He was named to the Soccer America All Freshman Team.

=== Professional ===
Dancy spent time with the Kansas City Wizards during the 1997 Major League Soccer pre-season, but was not signed to a contract. In May 1997, he joined the Orange County Zodiac of the USISL A-League. The Wizards called him up in August of that year and he played three games at the end of the season. The Wizards kept him on the roster for the 1998 season, but he played only one game in May and one in September with three games on loan to the Hershey Wildcats. In 1999, Dancy played fourteen games for the Wizards. The Wizards released him at the end of the season. In February 2000, the MetroStars selected Dancy in the sixth round (sixty-first overall) of the 2000 MLS SuperDraft. The team released him on February 22, 2000. Dancy joined the Zodiac for the 2000 season. In 2001, he finished his outdoor career with the Connecticut Wolves. In the fall of 2000, he signed with the Kansas City Attack of the National Professional Soccer League. In 2001, the Attack was renamed the Comets as the team moved to the second Major Indoor Soccer League. The Comets released Dancy at the end of the 2003 season. In January 2004, he returned to the Comets for the second half of the 2003–2004 season, playing fourteen games for the Comets that season. He then began the 2004–2005 season with the Comets, playing two games before being released. Dancy also played a handful of games as a player-coach for the Orlando Sharks during the 2007–2008 MISL season.

== Coach ==
On September 25, 2007, Dancy became the head coach of the Orlando Sharks of the MISL. The team folded at the end of the season.

== Personal ==
In February 1997, Dancy had an altercation with Brian Kamler during a preseason match. Kamler's face was broken in seven places, including his cheek and around his left eye. Kamler filed a lawsuit against Dancy and the U.S. Soccer Federation for $7.3 million. Dancy was charged with a felony for assault by the Los Angeles County District Attorney's office. A trial was held on May 18, 1998, and Dancy pleaded no contest to the charge. Dancy was sentenced five years probation.

== Present Life ==
Dancy currently works as the Operations Manager and National Sales Director for the Mystery Shopping Company, Shoppers' Critique International.
