= Mo Johnston =

Scottish footballer and manager (born 1963)

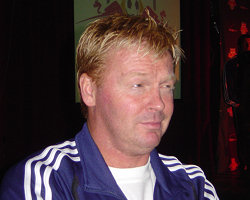

Personal information
- Full name: Maurice John Giblin Johnston
- Date of birth: 13 April 1963 (age 63)
- Place of birth: Glasgow, Scotland
- Height: 5 ft 9 in (1.75 m)
- Position: Forward

Youth career
- Milton Battlefield

Senior career*
Years	Team	Apps	(Gls)
1979–1983	Partick Thistle	85	(41)
1983–1984	Watford	38	(23)
1984–1987	Celtic	99	(52)
1987–1989	Nantes	66	(22)
1989–1991	Rangers	76	(31)
1991–1993	Everton	34	(10)
1993–1995	Heart of Midlothian	35	(5)
1995–1996	Falkirk	41	(6)
1996–2001	Kansas City Wizards	149	(31)
Total		623	(221)

International career
1984–1991	Scotland	38	(14)

Managerial career
- 2005–2006: New York Red Bulls
- 2007–2008: Toronto FC
- * Club domestic league appearances and goals

Maurice John Giblin Johnston (born 13 April 1963) is a Scottish former football player and coach. Johnston, who played as a forward, started his senior football career with Partick Thistle in 1981. He moved to Watford in 1983, where he scored 23 league goals and helped them reach the 1984 FA Cup Final. In 1984 he joined Celtic and scored 72 goals in 128 matches, won the Scottish Cup in 1985 and the Scottish league championship in 1986. Johnston signed for Nantes in 1987. He returned to Glasgow with Rangers in 1989, becoming the second player to cross the Old Firm divide since World War II (Alfie Conn was first) and the first open Catholic to play for Rangers since World War I.

Johnston won two Scottish league titles with Rangers, scoring 46 goals in 100 games. He later played for Everton, Hearts, Falkirk and American Major League Soccer (MLS) side Kansas City Wizards. Johnston received his first international cap for Scotland in 1984, when he was at Watford. He scored 14 goals in 38 appearances for Scotland, including one at the 1990 World Cup.

After retiring as a football player in 2001, Johnston coached in MLS. He was most recently the manager and later Director of Soccer at MLS club Toronto FC before he parted company with them on 14 September 2010.

== Club career ==
=== Partick Thistle ===
Johnston started his career in 1981 with Partick Thistle and scored 41 goals in two and a half seasons there.

=== Watford ===
Johnston then moved on to English club Watford for a fee of £210,000 in November 1983, when they were struggling against relegation from the First Division a season after finishing second. His arrival revived their season as they recovered well to finish mid table, as he scored 20 goals in just 29 league games. He also helped them reach their first ever FA Cup final, which they lost 2–0 to Everton. He began the 1984–85 season still at Vicarage Road and got three goals in nine First Division games before returning to Scotland.

=== Celtic ===
Johnston scored 14 league goals in 27 games during his first season at the club. In 1985–86 he scored 15 goals from 32 Premier Division games as Celtic won the league title. During the 1986–87 season Johnston scored 23 goals from 40 games.

=== Nantes ===
Johnston moved on to French club Nantes in 1987 and scored 22 goals in two seasons there. After initially claiming he would never return to Scotland, Johnston reconsidered and appeared at a press conference to announce that he would sign for Celtic at the end of his contract with Nantes.

=== Rangers ===
In July 1989, Johnston opted not to return to Celtic (who had recently sold his replacement Frank McAvennie back to West Ham United) and instead joined Graeme Souness's Rangers. From the early 20th century onwards, Catholics had not been knowingly signed by Rangers, nor employed in other prominent roles as an 'unwritten rule'. Johnston was "their first major Roman Catholic signing". He was the highest-profile Catholic to sign for the club since the World War I era, though other Catholics had signed for Rangers before. The move angered both Celtic and Rangers supporters. A handful of Rangers fans burned scarves and threatened to hand in season tickets over the signing but attendances held firm while Celtic fans referred to Johnston as Judas. Rangers' kitman Jimmy Bell protested by making Johnston arrange his own kit and withholding from him the chocolate bars dispensed to other players until he scored against Celtic. He won over a lot of Rangers fans in November 1989, when he scored a late winning goal in an Old Firm derby match.

=== Everton ===
On 18 November 1991, Johnston signed to Everton for £1.5M, forming a three-man strikeforce alongside Tony Cottee and Peter Beardsley. He scored seven goals in 21 league games as Everton finished mid table in the 1991–92 campaign of the First Division. Johnston scored three goals in 13 games as Everton finished 13th in the first season of the new Premier League, losing his place in the first team to new signing Paul Rideout. One of his goals in the 1992–93 season came in a 3–0 away win over Manchester United in the second game of the Premier League season, and another the winning goal against Aston Villa two weeks later.

Despite the departure of Peter Beardsley to Newcastle United in the close season, Johnston remained out of the team during the 1993–94 campaign as manager Howard Kendall reverted to the traditional 4–4–2 formation and partnered Tony Cottee with Paul Rideout in attack.

In October 1993, Johnston was given a free transfer when attempts to sell him failed.

=== Return to Scottish football ===
Johnston returned to Scotland with Edinburgh club Heart of Midlothian, making 31 appearances in his first season and scoring four goals. He found himself out of the team the following season and was given another free transfer in February 1995 after a long dispute over the settlement of his contract. Joining Falkirk, he scored one goal in the remainder of that season and five in the next season as Falkirk were relegated from the Scottish Premier Division.

=== MLS ===
In 1996, Johnston moved to the United States and Major League Soccer, signing with the Kansas City Wiz (later renamed the Wizards). He scored 31 goals in 149 games for the club, adding a goal in 15 playoff games. He was part of the Wizards team that won the MLS Cup in 2000.

== International career ==
Mo Johnston made his debut with the Scotland national team in 1984 and played regularly under manager Andy Roxburgh following his appointment in July 1986.

He had been expected to make the squad for the 1986 FIFA World Cup but was dropped by Alex Ferguson (caretaker manager until the end of the World Cup after the death of Jock Stein in September 1985) after a late night incident during Scotland's preparations for their play-off against Australia in November 1985, in which Johnston had disturbed a member of the coaching staff in his hotel room. In Ferguson's autobiography, Managing My Life, which was published 14 years later, Ferguson stated that he had already warned Johnston about his conduct after he and teammate Frank McAvennie had bought drinks for themselves, fellow Scotland teammates and a group of young women in the hotel bar.

He played a part in getting Scotland to Italia 90 but retired from international competition after their early elimination. He briefly returned to the national side team for several Euro qualifiers in late 1991 but got injured against Switzerland and finally, in 1992 after scoring 14 goals in 38 caps, permanently retired from the national team. He was in the starting lineup for all three of Scotland's matches in the 1990 World Cup, scoring a penalty kick against Sweden.

== Managerial career ==
Johnston retired after the 2001 season, and from 2003 to 2005 was an assistant coach to Bob Bradley for the MetroStars. After Bradley was fired with three games left in the 2005 season, Johnston was named interim head coach. With a record to end the season of two wins and a tie, he led the team to the playoffs and was promoted to the full-time position with re-branded New York Red Bulls after the season. On 27 June 2006, after a 2-3-7 start to the 2006 season, Johnston was fired.

On 22 August 2006, Maple Leaf Sports & Entertainment (MLSE); owners of MLS club Toronto FC, announced Johnston as Head Coach beginning their inaugural 2007 season. Before the start of the 2008 season, it was announced that Johnston was moving upstairs to fill the role of Director of Football, though he retained the title of manager, while John Carver took over coaching duties at the time. Johnston earned himself the name "Trader Mo" because in the first half of the first season alone he had traded 9 players. Johnston's tenure as Director of Soccer ended when he was fired, along with head coach Preki, on 14 September 2010. Johnston's regular season record as Director of Soccer Operations was 32-51-31.

== Career statistics ==
=== International ===
Appearances and goals by national team and year
National team	Year	Apps	Goals
Scotland	1984	6	4
Scotland	1985	3	0
Scotland	1986	3	1
Scotland	1987	4	0
Scotland	1988	7	3
Scotland	1989	7	4
Scotland	1990	6	2
Scotland	1991	2	0
Total		38	14

Scores and results list Scotland's goal tally first, score column indicates score after each Johnston goal.

List of international goals scored by Mo Johnston
No.	Date	Venue	Opponent	Score	Result	Competition
1	28 February 1984	Hampden Park, Glasgow, Scotland	Wales	2–1	2–1	1984 British Home Championship
2	12 September 1984	Hampden Park, Glasgow, Scotland	Yugoslavia	5–1	6–1	Friendly
3	14 November 1984	Hampden Park, Glasgow, Scotland	Spain	1–0	3–1	1986 FIFA World Cup qualification
4	14 November 1984	Hampden Park, Glasgow, Scotland	Spain	2–0	3–1	1986 FIFA World Cup qualification
5	12 November 1986	Hampden Park, Glasgow, Scotland	Luxembourg	3–0	3–0	UEFA Euro 1988 qualifying
6	17 February 1988	Prince Faisal bin Fahd Stadium, Riyadh, Saudi Arabia	Saudi Arabia	1–1	2–2	Friendly
7	14 September 1988	Ullevaal Stadion, Oslo, Norway	Norway	2–1	2–1	1990 FIFA World Cup qualification
8	19 October 1988	Hampden Park, Glasgow, Scotland	Yugoslavia	1–0	1–1	1990 FIFA World Cup qualification
9	8 February 1989	Tsirion Stadium, Limassol, Cyprus	Cyprus	1–0	3–2	1990 FIFA World Cup qualification
10	8 March 1989	Hampden Park, Glasgow, Scotland	France	1–0	2–0	1990 FIFA World Cup qualification
11	8 March 1989	Hampden Park, Glasgow, Scotland	France	2–0	2–0	1990 FIFA World Cup qualification
12	26 April 1989	Hampden Park, Glasgow, Scotland	Cyprus	1–0	2–1	1990 FIFA World Cup qualification
13	19 May 1990	Hampden Park, Glasgow, Scotland	Poland	1–0	1–1	Friendly
14	16 June 1990	Stadio Luigi Ferraris, Genoa, Italy	Sweden	2–0	2–1	1990 FIFA World Cup

=== Coaching record ===
As of 18 October 2014

Team	From	To	Record								
Team	From	To	G	W	D	L	GF	GA	GD	Win %	Ref.
MetroStars/NY Red Bulls	4 October 2005	26 June 2006	16	5	7	4	21	23	−2	31.25	
Toronto FC	22 August 2006	1 February 2008	30	6	7	17	25	49	−24	20.00	
Total			46	11	14	21	46	72	−26	23.91	—

== Honours ==
Watford

- FA Cup runner-up: 1983–84

Celtic

- Scottish Premier Division: 1985–86
- Scottish Cup: 1984–85

Rangers

- Scottish Premier Division: 1989–90, 1990–91
- Scottish League Cup runner-up: 1989–90

Kansas City Wizards

- MLS Cup: 2000
- Western Conference (MLS): 2000
- Supporters' Shield: 2000

Scotland

- The Rous Cup: 1985

Individual

- MLS All-Star: 1996, 1997, 1998

== See also ==
- Played for Celtic and Rangers
