= Scott Vermillion =

American soccer player (1976–2020)

Personal information
- Date of birth: December 23, 1976
- Place of birth: Independence, Missouri, U.S.
- Date of death: December 25, 2020 (aged 44)
- Place of death: Olathe, Kansas, U.S.
- Position: Defender

Youth career
- Olathe Soccer Club
- Olathe East High School

College career
Years	Team	Apps	(Gls)
1995–1997	Virginia Cavaliers		

Senior career*
Years	Team	Apps	(Gls)
1998	Kansas City Wizards	22	(1)
1999–2001	Colorado Rapids	28	(2)
2001	D.C. United	12	(0)

International career
1992–1993	United States U17		
1996	United States U20		
- * Club domestic league appearances and goals

Scott Vermillion (December 23, 1976 – December 25, 2020) was an American professional soccer player from Olathe, Kansas, who played for the Kansas City Wizards and Colorado Rapids. He entered the league in 1998 as a member of Generation Adidas, then known as Project 40. He was a Third Team All American in his junior year at the University of Virginia before joining Project 40. In his final season at UVA the team finished as runner up to UCLA in the 1997 NCAA Division I Men's Soccer Tournament.

He died on December 25, 2020, at the age of 44 from acute alcohol and prescription drug poisoning. In 2022, Boston University examined his brain and found that he suffered from chronic traumatic encephalopathy (CTE). Vermillion was the first American soccer player to have been diagnosed with CTE posthumously.
