= Chris Henderson =

American soccer player (born 1970)

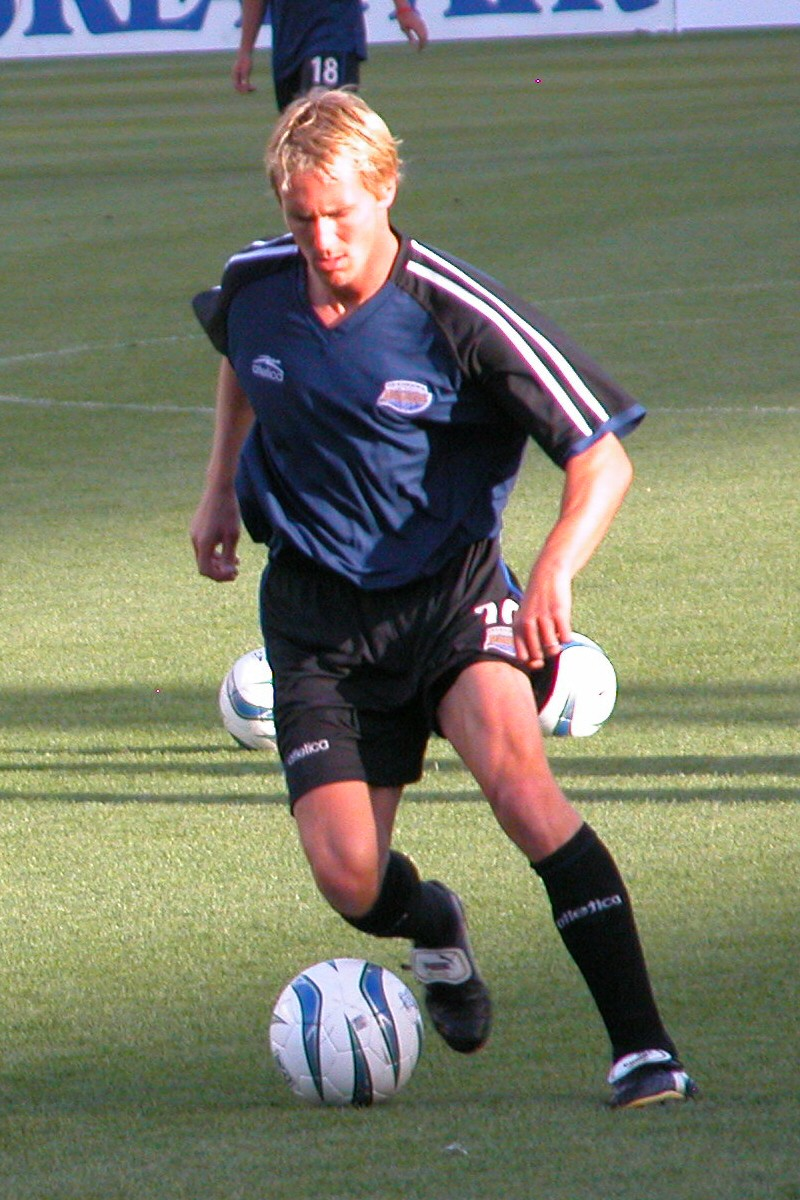
- Henderson playing for Colorado Rapids

Personal information
- Full name: Christopher Henderson
- Date of birth: December 11, 1970 (age 55)
- Place of birth: Edmonds, Washington, U.S.
- Height: 5 ft 9 in (1.75 m)
- Position: Midfielder

Team information
- Current team: Atlanta United (Sporting director)

College career
Years	Team	Apps	(Gls)
1989–1990	UCLA Bruins		

Senior career*
Years	Team	Apps	(Gls)
1989	Seattle Storm	12	(3)
1994–1995	FSV Frankfurt	15	(2)
1995–1996	Stabæk	12	(3)
1996–1998	Colorado Rapids	87	(12)
1999–2000	Kansas City Wizards	61	(12)
2001	Miami Fusion	25	(3)
2002–2005	Colorado Rapids	91	(19)
2005	Columbus Crew	21	(2)
2006	New York Red Bulls	32	(3)
Total		332	(59)

International career
1990–2001	United States	79	(3)
Medal record
Representing United States
Winner	CONCACAF Gold Cup	1991
Runner-up	CONCACAF Gold Cup	1993
Runner-up	CONCACAF Gold Cup	1998
Men's Soccer
- * Club domestic league appearances and goals

Christopher Henderson (born December 11, 1970) is an American former professional soccer player who played as a midfielder. He is currently the chief soccer officer and sporting director of Atlanta United FC.

== Club career ==
=== Early career ===
Henderson, older brother to Sean Henderson and younger brother to Pat Henderson, attended Cascade High School in Everett, Washington. In 1989, he was awarded the Gatorade Player of the Year. He played a single season with the Seattle Storm of the Western Soccer League earning first team All-Star honors and 1989 Rookie of the Year.

Henderson played two years of college soccer at UCLA, where he helped the team win a national championship his sophomore season. Upon graduating from college, Henderson played for 2. Bundesliga club FSV Frankfurt during the 1994–95 season. After the end of that season, he moved to the Norwegian league for Stabæk prior to 1996. He was inducted into the UCLA Athletics Hall of Fame in 2016.

=== Major League Soccer ===
Henderson returned to the U.S. and on March 11, 1996, the Colorado Rapids of Major League Soccer (MLS) named Henderson as a Discovery Player. He immediately stood out by starting 29 games, scoring three goals and eight assists, and being named the Rapids' Team MVP. Henderson spent the next two seasons with the Rapids, registering nine goals and 22 assists over 51 games. He then moved to the Kansas City Wizards for the 1999 season, where he started 29 games, scoring three goals and six assists. Henderson was scoring champion for KC in 2000, registering nine goals and nine assists in the KC Wizards team that won the MLS Cup and MLS Supporters' Shield.

He moved to the Miami Fusion for the 2001 season, where he scored three goals and eight assists on a team that went on to win the MLS Supporters' Shield in their final year. Upon Fusion's contraction, Henderson was reacquired by the Rapids in the 2002 MLS Dispersal Draft. Henderson continued to be a threat on the right for the Rapids, scoring 11 goals and seven assists in his first season back. He is the Rapids' all-time leader with 178 games played, 53 assists, 120 points, and a member of The Rapids Gallery of Honor. Henderson was traded to the Columbus Crew in May 2005. His final season he went to the NY/NJ MetroStars — soon renamed New York Red Bulls. Henderson played every match of the 2006 season and playoffs, and by its end he was the league's all-time leader in games/minutes played, though he has since lost the title. He went on to announce his retirement from professional soccer on December 22, 2006.

== International career ==
Henderson earned 79 caps with the U.S. national team throughout the 1990s, beginning with a call-up while still at UCLA. He started in a victory over Iceland and quickly established himself on the national team, seeing time in nearly every game leading up to the 1990 FIFA World Cup. He was on the U.S. roster at the 1990 World Cup – and the tournament's youngest player at 19. Henderson was a member of the U.S. team at the 1992 Summer Olympics in Barcelona.He was a key player in the US Men's National Team's first Gold Cup Championship in 1991. Henderson was the first player to score a goal for the United States Men's National Team in Copa America in 1993 in Ecuador.

Henderson continued to play with the national team until 1998. His last game in the 1990s came in a February 25, 1998 loss to Belgium as the U.S. prepared for the 1998 FIFA World Cup Henderson earned his next cap on October 25, 2000. His final cap, came on September 1, 2001. Over his 79-cap national team career, Henderson scored three goals and ten assists for the United States Men's National Team and three goals for the USA Men's Olympic Team.

== International goals ==
No.	Date	Venue	Opponent	Score	Result	Competition
1.	22 June 1993	Quito, Ecuador	Venezuela	1–0	3–3	1993 Copa América
2.	16 November 1997	Foxborough, United States	El Salvador	3–0	4–2	1998 FIFA World Cup qualification

== Post-playing career ==
Following his retirement as a player, Henderson rejoined the Kansas City Wizards as an assistant coach for the 2007 season. On January 24, 2008, it was announced that Henderson would be joining the front office of the Seattle Sounders FC as the technical director. Under Henderson, the Sounders reached the playoffs in 12 consecutive years starting with their expansion season in 2009. They have won four U.S. Open Cups, one Supporters' Shield, and two MLS Cup championships since joining the league.

Henderson was named the chief soccer officer and sporting director of Inter Miami CF on January 18, 2021. In 2023 Inter Miami CF won Leagues Cup and in 2024 they won MLS Supporter's Shield.

== Career statistics ==
Appearances and goals by club, season and competition
Club	Season	League			National cup (Note: Includes Open Cup)		League cup		Continental		Total	
Club	Season	Division	Apps	Goals	Apps	Goals	Apps	Goals	Apps	Goals	Apps	Goals
FSV Frankfurt	1994–95	2. Bundesliga	15	2	0	0	–		–		15	2
Colorado Rapids	1996	Major League Soccer	29	3								
Colorado Rapids	1997	Major League Soccer	30	7								
Colorado Rapids	1998	Major League Soccer	28	2								
Colorado Rapids	Total		87	12								
Kansas City Wizards	1999	Major League Soccer	30	3								
Kansas City Wizards	2000	Major League Soccer	31	9								
Kansas City Wizards	Total		61	12								
Miami Fusion	2001	Major League Soccer	25	3								
Colorado Rapids	2002	Major League Soccer	28	11								
Colorado Rapids	2003	Major League Soccer	26	4								
Colorado Rapids	2004	Major League Soccer	29	3								
Colorado Rapids	2005	Major League Soccer	8	1								
Colorado Rapids	Total		91	19								
Columbus Crew	2005	Major League Soccer	21	2								
New York Red Bulls	2006	Major League Soccer	32	3								
Career total			332	53								

== Honors ==
United States

- CONCACAF Gold Cup: 1991

Individual

- MLS All-Star: 1997, 2000 mls all star game 2001 USA
- MLS Humanitarian of the Year Award: 2004
