= Sean Bowers =

American soccer player and coach

Personal information
- Full name: Sean Patrick Bowers
- Date of birth: August 12, 1968 (age 58)
- Place of birth: San Diego, California, U.S.
- Height: 6 ft 2 in (1.88 m)
- Position: Defender

Youth career
- La Jolla Nomads
- 1987–1988: Miramar College
- 1989–1990: Quincy University

Senior career*
Years	Team	Apps	(Gls)
1991	San Diego Sockers (indoor)	1	(0)
1991–1995	Detroit Rockers (indoor)		
1993	Sacramento Knights (indoor)		
1995	Anaheim Splash (indoor)	52	(18)
1996–1999	Kansas City Wizards	111	(3)
1997–2001	Detroit Rockers (indoor)	56	(55)
2001–2003	Baltimore Blast (indoor)	74	(42)
2003–2005	San Diego Sockers (indoor)	38	(14)
2009–2010	San Diego Sockers (indoor)	3	(3)

International career
1995–2004	United States (futsal)	36	(5)

Managerial career
- 1999: William Jewell College (assistant)
- 2000–2001: Detroit Rockers US Olympics (assistant)
- 2001: Detroit Rocker Hawks
- 2002–2003: Baltimore Blast (interim)
- 2003–2005: California Baptist University (assistant)
- 2006: California Baptist University
- 2006–2008: San Diego SeaLions
- 2007–: Miramar College
Medal record
Representing United States
CONCACAF Futsal Championship
Gold medal – first place	1996	United States
Gold medal – first place	2004	United States (captain)
Futsal Mundialito
Bronze medal – third place	1998	Brazil
NPSL
Gold medal – first place	1991–92	Detroit Rockers
MISL
Gold medal – first place	2002–03	Baltimore Blast
PASL
Gold medal – first place	2009–10	San Diego Sockers
US Open Cup (indoor)
Gold medal – first place	2009–10	San Diego Sockers
- * Club domestic league appearances and goals

Sean Patrick Bowers (born August 12, 1968) is an American former professional soccer player who played as a defender. He had a long career primarily in indoor soccer, where he was named the 1992 NPSL Rookie of the Year, won four Defender of the Year awards across multiple leagues, and was a six-time first-team All-Star in four different indoor circuits. He also appeared in four seasons of Major League Soccer with the Kansas City Wizards.

Bowers represented the United States men's national futsal team from 1995 to 2004, earning a national record 36 caps and five goals. As captain from 1998 onward, he led the team to CONCACAF Futsal Championship titles in 1996 and 2004, competed in the 1996 and 2004 FIFA Futsal World Championships, and helped the United States finish third at the 1998 Futsal Mundialito.

Following his retirement in 2010, Bowers coached at the collegiate and semi-professional levels, including as head coach of the women's soccer programs at California Baptist University (2006) and Miramar College (2007–present), and as head coach of the San Diego SeaLions (2006–2008). He also served as interim head coach of the Baltimore Blast during their 2002–03 MISL championship season.

Bowers is the current president of the San Diego Sockers of the Major Arena Soccer League (MASL) and executive vice president of sports management at Frontwave Arena.

== High school and college ==
Bowers grew up in San Diego, California, where he played his youth soccer with the San Diego Nomads. He also played goalkeeper at Mira Mesa High School where he was two-time All City. Following high school, he attended Miramar College for two years before finishing college at Quincy University in Quincy, Illinois. He played soccer at both Miramar and Quincy. In 1990, Bowers led Quincy in scoring, being named the team MVP. He graduated in 1991 with a bachelor's degree in political science.

== Playing career ==
Bowers had a lengthy professional career spanning indoor and outdoor soccer from 1991 to 2010, primarily as a defender. He earned multiple accolades across leagues, including being a six-time first-team All-Star, four-time Defender of the Year, and the only player in NPSL/MISL history to achieve at least 1,000 blocks and 1,000 points.

=== Early indoor career (1991–1996) ===
In 1991, Bowers signed with the San Diego Sockers of the Major Indoor Soccer League (MISL), appearing in their season opener. He soon moved to the Detroit Rockers of the National Professional Soccer League (NPSL), where he was named NPSL Rookie of the Year in 1991–92 as the Rockers won the league championship.

He remained with the Rockers through 1995, earning NPSL Defender of the Year honors in 1994 and 1995, and was a four-time NPSL All-Star. In 1993, while with the Rockers, he also played a single season with the Sacramento Knights of the summer Continental Indoor Soccer League (CISL) and was named CISL Defender of the Year. Bowers returned to the CISL in 1995 and 1996 with the Anaheim Splash.

=== MLS outdoor career and concurrent indoor play (1996–1999) ===
The Kansas City Wiz (later Wizards) of the newly formed Major League Soccer (MLS) selected Bowers in the third round (26th overall) of the 1996 MLS Inaugural Player Draft. He played four seasons with the Wizards from 1996 to 1999, appearing in 111 league matches and scoring 3 goals. He served as team captain in 1999 and earned the club's Defender of the Year award twice (1996 and 1997).

During this period, he continued indoor play, rejoining the Detroit Rockers in 1997 (and later 2000–01 after a brief gap) until the team folded in 2001.

=== Later indoor career and retirement (2001–2010) ===
The Baltimore Blast selected Bowers in the dispersal draft following the Rockers' closure. With the NPSL transitioning to the new Major Indoor Soccer League (MISL), he spent two seasons with the Blast (2001–03), winning the 2003 MISL championship and earning 2002–03 MISL Defender of the Year and All-Star honors.

On July 16, 2003, the Blast traded Bowers to the San Diego Sockers in exchange for Carlos Farias and the first and second picks in the 2003 Amateur Draft. He played 33 games with the Sockers from 2003–05 (scoring 14 goals) but only five games in the following season before the team folded.

Bowers initially retired in 2005 to settle in San Diego and pursue coaching. He returned briefly in 2009–10 with the revived San Diego Sockers of the Professional Arena Soccer League (PASL), contributing to their PASL championship and US Open Cup title before retiring fully.

== Futsal ==
Bowers was a member of the United States men's national futsal team from 1995 to 2004, earning a total of 36 caps and scoring 5 goals.

A defender, Bowers received his first call-up in 1996 shortly after his rookie season in Major League Soccer, despite having no prior futsal experience. He quickly became a regular starter and served as team captain from 1998 to 2004.

Under his captaincy, the United States won the CONCACAF Futsal Championship gold medals in 1996 and 2004, qualifying for the FIFA Futsal World Championship in both years. Bowers captained the team at the 1996 FIFA Futsal World Championship in Spain and the 2004 FIFA Futsal World Championship in Taiwan (Chinese Taipei). In 2004, the U.S. advanced to the second round for the first time since 1992.

In 1998, the team finished third at the Futsal Mundialito in Brazil.

Bowers retired from international futsal following the 2004 World Championship. He holds the U.S. men's national futsal team record for most caps (36), surpassing the previous mark of 30 held by Jim Gabarra.

== Coaching ==
In 1999, Bowers became an assistant coach with William Jewell College women's soccer team. This was the start of his coaching career. Bowers began coaching on the professional level with the Detroit Rockers in 2000–2001. That season, he served as an assistant coach in addition to playing. In 2001, he became the head coach with the Detroit Rocker Hawks, winners of the 2001 USASA Women's U.S. Open Cup. In 2002, he became the interim head coach of the Baltimore Blast. At the time, the Blast were at the bottom of the standings. Bowers took them into the playoffs and the Blast ended up winning the MISL championship that season. In 2003, the Blast traded Bowers to the San Diego Sockers. When Bowers arrived in southern California, he became an assistant coach with the California Baptist University women's team from 2003 to 2005. He was elevated to the position of head coach in 2006, taking them to an end of season ranking of ninth in the NAIA. He also was named the head coach of the San Diego SeaLions of the Women's Premier Soccer League (WPSL) in 2006. That year the SeaLions went to the WPSL semifinals. On March 27, 2007, Miramar College announced the creation of a women's soccer team with Bowers as its coach.

== Honors ==
Rookie of the Year

- NPSL: 1991–1992

Defender of the Year

- NPSL: 1994, 1995
- CISL: 1993
- MISL II: 2002

First Team All Star

- NPSL: 1993, 1995
- CISL: 1993, 1995
- MISL II: 2002, 2003
