= Vitalis Takawira =

Zimbabwean footballer (born 1972)

Personal information
- Full name: Vitalis Takawira
- Date of birth: 24 September 1972 (age 54)
- Place of birth: Salisbury, Rhodesia
- Position: Striker

Senior career*
Years	Team	Apps	(Gls)
1989–1995	Dynamos		
1995–1996	FC Winterthur	10	(9)
1996–2000	Kansas City Wizards	110	(29)
2000–2002	Milwaukee Rampage	70	(39)
2002–2004	Milwaukee Wave United	30	(8)

International career^{‡}
1992–1999	Zimbabwe	26	(12)
- * Club domestic league appearances and goals as of 15 August 2010 ‡ National team caps and goals as of 15 August 2010

Vitalis "Digital" Takawira (born 24 September 1972 in Salisbury) is a retired Zimbabwean football player. He has played forward and attacking midfield professionally in Zimbabwe, Switzerland and the United States, as well as for the Zimbabwe national team.

== Career ==
He came to prominence in Zimbabwe while playing for popular Harare outfit, Dynamos, where he was top goal scorer for five seasons. Takawira was the top scorer in the Zimbabwean First Division four times and won the African Golden Boot in 1994. He signed with Major League Soccer in 1996, and was allocated to Kansas City Wiz (later Wizards). Takawira spent the next four years with Kansas City, playing 110 times, with 29 goals scored and 19 assists in the league. After goals, he would often celebrate with the Digital Crawl, where he would get down and walk on all fours as teammates joined in.

After leaving MLS, Takawira moved down to the A-League, where he played for Milwaukee Rampage and Milwaukee Wave United. He was named A-League MVP in 2000 and helped Rampage to the league title in 2002.

For Zimbabwe, Takawira played from 1992 to 1999, and scored 12 goals in 26 appearances.

== Honors ==
Individual

- MLS All-Star: 1996, 1997
