= 2000 Kansas City Wizards season =

Kansas City Wizards
2000 season
- Head coach: Bob Gansler
- Major League Soccer: West: 1st Overall: 1st
- USOC: Second Round
- Playoffs: Champions
- Top goalscorer: League: Miklos Molnar (12); All: Miklos Molnar (17)
- Average home league attendance: 9,112
Home colors	Away colors

In 2000 the Kansas City Wizards earned their first ever honor winning the MLS Supporters' Shield by finishing atop the regular season point total (57). The Wizards continued good play took them through the playoffs and into MLS Cup 2000 versus the Chicago Fire where they finished their season in a 1-0 victory earning the club the MLS Double. 2000 was the first season that MLS games could finish in a draw, but to do so tied matches had an additional ten-minute overtime.

== Squad ==
Note: Flags indicate national team as defined under FIFA eligibility rules; some limited exceptions apply. Players may hold more than one non-FIFA nationality.

No.	Pos.	Nation	Player
1	GK	USA	Tony Meola
2	MF	USA	Matt McKeon
3	DF	USA	Nick Garcia
4	DF	USA	Brandon Prideaux
5	FW	USA	Brian Johnson
6	DF	USA	Peter Vermes
7	FW	DEN	Miklos Molnar
8	MF	USA	Chris Brown
9	FW	CAN	Alex Bunbury
10	FW	SCO	Mo Johnston
11	MF	USA	Preki
12	FW	UGA	Peter Byaruhanga

No.	Pos.	Nation	Player
13	MF	USA	Vicente Figueroa
14	DF	USA	Michael Green
15	MF	USA	Kerry Zavagnin
16	DF	USA	John Wilson
17	MF	USA	Chris Klein
18	DF	USA	Tahj Jakins
19	MF	USA	Chris Henderson
20	DF	NGR	Uche Okafor
21	MF	USA	Francisco Gomez
22	FW	TTO	Gary Glasgow
23	FW	RUS	Ihor Dotsenko
25	GK	USA	Bo Oshoniyi

== Competitions ==
=== Major League Soccer ===
Overall								Home						Away					
Pld	W	D	L	GF	GA	GD	Pts	W	D	L	GF	GA	GD	W	D	L	GF	GA	GD
32	16	9	7	47	29	+18	57	11	1	4	27	14	+13	5	8	3	20	15	+5

Last updated: 2000.
Source: Major League Soccer

Date	Opponents	H / A	Result F–A	Scorers	Attendance
March 25, 2000	Chicago Fire S.C.	H	4–3	Molnar; Klein; Henderson; Preki	
April 1, 2000	Colorado Rapids	H	3–0	Molnar; Johnston; Klein	
April 8, 2000	Miami Fusion	A	0–0		
April 15, 2000	San Jose Earthquakes	H	2–0	Henderson; Molnar	
April 19, 2000	MetroStars	A	2–1	Molnar 2	
April 22, 2000	Tampa Bay Mutiny	H	1–0	Johnston	
April 29, 2000	Colorado Rapids	A	5–0	Johnston; Klein; Preki; McKeon; Henderson	
May 6, 2000	Los Angeles Galaxy	A	0–0		
May 13, 2000	MetroStars	H	2–0	McKeon; Henderson	
May 17, 2000	D.C. United	H	2–0	Zavagnin; Molnar	
May 20, 2000	San Jose Earthquakes	H	2–0	Vermes; Molnar	
May 27, 2000	Tampa Bay Mutiny	A	2–1	Vermes; Molnar	
June 4, 2000	Chicago Fire S.C.	A	2–3	Glasgow; Henderson	
June 10, 2000	D.C. United	A	0–0		
June 17, 2000	Dallas Burn	A	1–4	McKeon	
June 21, 2000	Dallas Burn	H	0–0		
June 24, 2000	Los Angeles Galaxy	H	2–0	Klein; Glasgow	
July 4, 2000	San Jose Earthquakes	A	0–0		
July 8, 2000	MetroStars	H	0–1		
July 15, 2000	Columbus Crew	A	0–2		
July 19, 2000	New England Revolution	H	0–1		
July 22, 2000	Columbus Crew	H	3–1	Klein; Henderson 2	
August 2, 2000	Colorado Rapids	H	3–1	Zavagnin; Molnar; Glasgow	
August 5, 2000	Los Angeles Galaxy	H	1–5	Johnston	
August 12, 2000	Los Angeles Galaxy	A	1–1	Klein	
August 16, 2000	San Jose Earthquakes	A	3–0	Gomez; Figueroa; Henderson	
August 18, 2000	Miami Fusion	H	1–2	Gomez	
August 23, 2000	MetroStars	A	0–0		
August 26, 2000	Colorado Rapids	A	1–1	Preki	
September 2, 2000	Tampa Bay Mutiny	H	1–0	Molnar	
September 6, 2000	New England Revolution	A	1–0	Molnar	
September 9, 2000	Tampa Bay Mutiny	A	2–2	Henderson; Molnar	

=== U.S. Open Cup ===
Date	Round	Opponents	H / A	Result F–A	Scorers	Attendance
June 14, 2000	Second Round	Chicago Sockers	A	0–0 PK (6-7)		

=== MLS Cup Playoffs ===
Date	Round	Opponents	H / A	Result F–A	Scorers	Attendance
September 16, 2000	Conference Semifinals	Colorado Rapids	H	1–0	Molnar	
September 20, 2000	Conference Semifinals	Colorado Rapids	A	0–0		
September 24, 2000	Conference Semifinals	Colorado Rapids	H	3–2	Henderson; Molnar; Gomez	
September 29, 2000	Conference Finals	Los Angeles Galaxy	H	0–0		
October 3, 2000	Conference Finals	Los Angeles Galaxy	A	1–2	McKeon	
October 6, 2000	Conference Finals	Los Angeles Galaxy	H	2–0	Molnar 2	
October 15, 2000	MLS Cup 2000	Chicago Fire S.C.	N	1–0	Molnar	

== Squad statistics ==
No.	Pos.	Name	MLS		USOC		Playoffs		Total		Minutes		Discipline	
No.	Pos.	Name	Apps	Goals	Apps	Goals	Apps	Goals	Apps	Goals	League	Total	Yellow card	Red card
6	DF	(United States) Peter Vermes	32	2	1	0	7	0	40	2	2916	3695	0	0
3	DF	(United States) Nick Garcia	32	0	1	0	7	0	40	0	2916	3695	0	0
15	MF	(United States) Kerry Zavagnin	31	2	1	0	7	0	39	2	2743	3522	0	0
19	MF	(United States) Chris Henderson	31	9	1	0	7	1	39	10	2694	3406	0	0
11	MF	(United States) Preki	31	3	1	0	7	0	39	3	2485	3138	0	0
1	GK	(United States) Tony Meola	31	0	0	0	7	0	38	0	2826	3485	0	0
4	DF	(United States) Brandon Prideaux	31	0	0	0	7	0	38	0	2809	3468	0	0
2	MF	Matt McKeon	30	3	0	0	7	1	37	4	2631	3202	0	0
17	MF	(United States) Chris Klein	27	6	1	0	7	0	35	6	2205	2883	0	0
10	FW	(Scotland) Mo Johnston	25	4	1	0	5	0	30	4	1982	2451	0	0
8	MF	(United States) Chris Brown	22	0	1	0	4	0	27	0	1116	1442	0	0
7	FW	(Denmark) Miklos Molnar	17	12	0	0	7	5	24	17	1353	2012	0	0
5	FW	(United States) Brian Johnson	18	0	1	0	3	0	22	0	586	619	0	0
21	MF	(United States) Francisco Gomez	14	2	1	0	6	1	21	3	709	1001	0	0
20	DF	(Nigeria) Uche Okafor	14	0	1	0	1	0	16	0	298	434	0	0
22	FW	(Trinidad and Tobago) Gary Glasgow	11	3	1	0	0	0	12	3	479	599	0	0
13	--	Vicente Figueroa	8	1	1	0	0	0	9	1	322	400	0	0
9	FW	(Canada) Alex Bunbury	5	0	1	0	0	0	6	0	259	326	0	0
12	--	Peter Byaruhanga	6	0	0	0	0	0	6	0	170	170	0	0
16	DF	(United States) John Wilson	3	0	0	0	0	0	3	0	103	103	0	0
25	GK	(United States) Bo Oshoniyi	1	0	1	0	0	0	2	0	90	210	0	0
18	DF	(United States) Tahj Jakins	2	0	0	0	0	0	2	0	118	118	0	0
23	FW	(Russia) Ihor Dotsenko	2	0	0	0	0	0	2	0	90	90	0	0

Final Statistics
