= 2001 Kansas City Wizards season =

Kansas City Wizards
2001 season
- Head coach: Bob Gansler
- Major League Soccer: West: 3rd Overall: 7th
- USOC: Third Round
- Playoffs: Quarterfinals
- Copa Merconorte: Group Stage
- Top goalscorer: League: Roy Lassiter (7); All: Roy Lassiter (10)
- Average home league attendance: 10,954
Home colors	Away colors

The following are stats for the Kansas City Wizards' 2001 season. The 2001 MLS season was cut short as a result of the terrorist attacks of 9/11.

== Squad ==
Note: Flags indicate national team as defined under FIFA eligibility rules; some limited exceptions apply. Players may hold more than one non-FIFA nationality.

No.	Pos.	Nation	Player
1	GK	USA	Tony Meola
2	MF	USA	Matt McKeon
3	DF	USA	Nick Garcia
4	DF	USA	Brandon Prideaux
5	FW	USA	Brian Johnson
6	DF	USA	Peter Vermes
7	FW	USA	AJ Wood
7	MF	USA	Mark Santel
8	MF	USA	Chris Brown
9	MF	USA	Kerry Zavagnin
10	FW	SCO	Mo Johnston
12	FW	UGA	Peter Byaruhanga

No.	Pos.	Nation	Player
13	MF	USA	Andrew Gregor
14	DF	USA	Michael Green
15	FW	USA	Roy Lassiter
16/29	DF	USA	Mike Burns
17	MF	USA	Chris Klein
18	DF	USA	Tahj Jakins
20	DF	USA	Jose Burciaga Jr.
21	MF	USA	Francisco Gomez
22	FW	TTO	Gary Glasgow
23/32	FW	JAM	Onandi Lowe
25	GK	USA	Bo Oshoniyi
26	MF	USA	Narciso Fernandes

== Competitions ==
=== Major League Soccer ===
Overall								Home						Away					
Pld	W	D	L	GF	GA	GD	Pts	W	D	L	GF	GA	GD	W	D	L	GF	GA	GD
27	11	3	13	33	53	−20	36	8	1	4	19	21	−2	3	2	9	14	32	−18

Last updated: 2001.
Source: Major League Soccer & RSSSF

Date	Opponents	H / A	Result F – A	Scorers	Attendance
April 7, 2001	D.C. United	A	2–3	Lassiter; McKeon
April 14, 2001	Los Angeles Galaxy	H	2–1	Brown; Klein
April 18, 2001	Miami Fusion	H	2–1	Brown; Johnston
April 21, 2001	Columbus Crew	A	3–0	Gomez; Brown; McKeon
April 28, 2001	San Jose Earthquakes	H	0–0
May 2, 2001	MetroStars	A	1–4	Zavagnin
May 5, 2001	Los Angeles Galaxy	A	1–2 (OT)	McKeon
May 19, 2001	Chicago Fire S.C.	A	0–2
May 24, 2001	MetroStars	H	1–0	Lowe
June 2, 2001	Tampa Bay Mutiny	A	2–1	Gomez; Lassiter
June 9, 2001	Miami Fusion	A	1–5	McKeon
June 13, 2001	Los Angeles Galaxy	A	0–4
June 16, 2001	D.C. United	H	0–3
June 23, 2001	San Jose Earthquakes	A	0–2
June 30, 2001	Tampa Bay Mutiny	H	3–0	Gomez; Brown; McKeon
July 4, 2001	Chicago Fire S.C.	H	0–7
July 7, 2001	New England Revolution	A	2–1	Klein; Brown
July 14, 2001	Dallas Burn	H	3–2	Lassiter 2 Lowe
July 18, 2001	Colorado Rapids	A	0–0
July 29, 2001	New England Revolution	H	2–0	Santel; Glasgow
August 4, 2001	Columbus Crew	H	1–3	Lowe
August 12, 2001	Colorado Rapids	A	2–2	Gomez; Lassiter
August 15, 2001	Los Angeles Galaxy	H	1–2 (OT)	Lowe
August 19, 2001	Colorado Rapids	H	3–2	Klein; Lassiter; Glasgow
August 25, 2001	Dallas Burn	A	0–3
September 1, 2001	San Jose Earthquakes	A	0–3
September 8, 2001	San Jose Earthquakes	H	1–0	Lassiter

=== U.S. Open Cup ===
Date	Round	Opponents	H / A	Result F – A	Scorers	Attendance
June 27, 2001	Second Round	Seattle Sounders (USL)	H	4–0	Own goal Santel; McKeon; Burns
July 11, 2001	Third Round	Chicago Fire S.C.	H	0–1

=== MLS Cup Playoffs ===
Date	Round	Opponents	H / A	Result F – A	Scorers	Attendance
September 22, 2001	Conference Semifinals	Miami Fusion	A	0–2
September 26, 2001	Conference Semifinals	Miami Fusion	H	3–0	Lowe; McKeon; Gomez
September 29, 2001	Conference Semifinals	Miami Fusion	A	1–2	Lowe

=== Copa Merconorte ===
Team	Pts	Pld	W	D	L	GF	GA	GD
(Mexico) Santos Laguna	15	6	5	0	1	15	6	+9
(Peru) Sporting Cristal	11	6	3	2	1	10	10	0
(United States) Kansas City Wizards	4	6	1	1	4	8	12	−4
(Ecuador) Barcelona	3	6	0	3	3	9	14	−5

Date	Opponents	H / A	Result F – A	Scorers	Attendance
August 1, 2001	Sporting Cristal	H	1–2	Lowe
August 8, 2001	Santos Laguna	A	2–4	McKeon; Lassiter
August 29, 2001	Barcelona SC	A	3–2	Lassiter; Brown; Gomez
September 12, 2001	Sporting Cristal	A	1–2	Lowe
October 17, 2001	Barcelona SC	H	1–1	Lassiter
November 21, 2001	Santos Laguna	H	0–1

== Squad statistics ==
No.	Pos.	Name	MLS		USOC		Playoffs		Copa Merconorte		Total		Minutes		Discipline	
No.	Pos.	Name	Apps	Goals	Apps	Goals	Apps	Goals	Apps	Goals	Apps	Goals	League	Total	Yellow card	Red card
9	MF	(United States) Kerry Zavagnin	27	1	2	0	3	0	6	0	38	1	2472	3326	0	0
2	MF	(United States) Matt McKeon	26	5	2	1	3	1	6	1	37	8	2372	3362	0	0
8	MF	(United States) Chris Brown	27	5	2	0	3	0	5	1	37	6	2034	2814	0	0
3	DF	(United States) Nick Garcia	24	0	2	0	3	0	5	0	34	0	2142	2976	0	0
21	MF	(United States) Francisco Gomez	24	4	1	0	3	1	6	1	34	6	1320	1889	0	0
17	MF	(United States) Chris Klein	24	3	1	0	3	0	5	0	33	3	2039	2769	0	0
15	FW	(United States) Roy Lassiter	23	7	2	0	3	0	5	3	33	10	1648	2100	0	0
6	DF	(United States) Peter Vermes	20	0	2	0	3	0	4	0	29	0	1826	2636	0	0
16/29	DF	(United States) Mike Burns	19	0	2	1	3	0	5	0	29	1	1179	1981	0	0
4	DF	(United States) Brandon Prideaux	23	0	2	0	0	0	3	0	28	0	2028	2335	0	0
22	FW	(Trinidad and Tobago) Gary Glasgow	18	2	1	0	3	0	5	0	27	2	1124	1687	0	0
7	MF	(United States) Mark Santel	21	1	2	1	0	0	4	0	27	2	813	1089	0	0
1	GK	(United States) Tony Meola	17	0	0	0	3	0	4	0	24	0	1534	2164	0	0
13	MF	(United States) Andrew Gregor	13	0	2	0	3	0	5	0	23	0	812	1428	0	0
23/32	FW	(Jamaica) Onandi Lowe	13	4	1	0	3	2	3	2	20	8	1034	1604	0	0
10	FW	(Scotland) Mo Johnston	11	1	0	0	3	0	2	0	16	1	864	1077	0	0
25	GK	(United States) Bo Oshoniyi	11	0	2	0	0	0	2	0	15	0	938	1298	0	0
18	DF	(United States) Tahj Jakins	10	0	1	0	0	0	2	0	13	0	604	792	0	0
14	--	(United States) Michael Green	3	0	1	0	0	0	1	0	5	0	154	334	0	0
20	DF	(United States) Jose Burciaga Jr.	3	0	0	0	0	0	1	0	4	0	93	183	0	0
5	FW	(United States) Brian Johnson	3	0	0	0	0	0	0	0	3	0	62	62	0	0
26	--	Narciso Fernandes	1	0	0	0	0	0	0	0	1	0	6	6	0	0

Final Statistics
