= 2002–03 Rushden & Diamonds F.C. season =

Rushden & Diamonds
2002–03 season
- Manager: Brian Talbot
- Stadium: Nene Park
- Third Division: 1st (promoted)
- FA Cup: First round
- League Cup: Second round
- Football League Trophy: First round

During the 2002–03 English football season, Rushden & Diamonds competed in the Third Division.

== Season summary ==
Rushden & Diamonds finished the season as Third Division champions, ensuring their first ever season in the Second Division.

== Kit ==
Rushden & Diamonds retained the previous season's kit, which was manufactured by Fila and sponsored by Dr. Martens.

== First-team squad ==
Squad at end of season

Note: Flags indicate national team as defined under FIFA eligibility rules; some limited exceptions apply. Players may hold more than one non-FIFA nationality.

No.	Pos.	Nation	Player
1	GK	(England) ENG	Billy Turley
3	DF	(England) ENG	Paul Underwood
4	DF	(Northern Ireland) NIR	Barry Hunter
5	DF	(Wales) WAL	Mark Peters
6	DF	(England) ENG	Andy Edwards
7	MF	(England) ENG	Stuart Wardley
8	MF	(England) ENG	Ritchie Hanlon
9	FW	(England) ENG	Dean Holdsworth
10	FW	(England) ENG	Duane Darby
11	MF	(England) ENG	Andy Burgess
12	DF	(Scotland) SCO	Stuart Gray (Note: Gray was born in Harrogate, England, but also qualified to represent Scotland internationally through his father and represented Scotland at U-21 level.)
13	GK	(England) ENG	Stuart Naylor
14	DF	(England) ENG	Marcus Bignot

No.	Pos.	Nation	Player
15	MF	(England) ENG	Gary Mills
16	GK	(England) ENG	Adam Sollitt
17	DF	(England) ENG	Gary Setchell
18	MF	(England) ENG	David Bell (Note: Bell was born in Wellingborough, England, but also qualified to represent the Republic of Ireland internationally and represented the Republic of Ireland at U-21 and B level.)
19	MF	(England) ENG	Daniel Talbot
20	DF	(England) ENG	Andrew Sambrook
21	FW	(Wales) WAL	Robert Duffy
22	FW	(Jamaica) JAM	Paul Hall (Note: Hall was born in Manchester, England, but also qualified to represent Jamaica internationally and made his international debut for Jamaica in 1997.)
24	DF	(England) ENG	John Dempster
31	FW	(Jamaica) JAM	Onandi Lowe
33	DF	(Republic of Ireland) IRL	David Bell
36	MF	(England) ENG	Owen Story
40	DF	(Nigeria) NGA	Magnus Okuonghae (Note: Okuonghae was born in Lagos, Nigeria, but also qualified to represent England internationally and represented England at C level.)

=== Left club during season ===
Note: Flags indicate national team as defined under FIFA eligibility rules; some limited exceptions apply. Players may hold more than one non-FIFA nationality.

No.	Pos.	Nation	Player
2	DF	(England) ENG	Tarkan Mustafa (on loan to Doncaster Rovers; sold to Dagenham & Redbridge)
6	DF	(England) ENG	Andy Tillson (retired)
9	FW	(England) ENG	Scott Partridge (on loan to Exeter City; sold to Shrewsbury Town)
14	MF	(Republic of Ireland) IRL	Michael McElhatton (retired)

No.	Pos.	Nation	Player
16	GK	(Wales) WAL	Tony Pennock (to Farnborough Town)
23	DF	(England) ENG	Brett Solkhon (on loan to Canvey Island; sold to Kettering Town)
25	FW	(England) ENG	Tony Battersby (released)
