= 2002 Kansas City Wizards season =

Kansas City Wizards
2002 season
- Head coach: Bob Gansler
- Major League Soccer: West: 5th Overall: 8th
- USOC: Semifinals
- Playoffs: Quarterfinals
- CONCACAF Champions' Cup: Semifinals
- Top goalscorer: League: Preki; Chris Klein (7); All: Preki (12)
- Average home league attendance: 12,255
Home colors	Away colors

== Squad ==
Note: Flags indicate national team as defined under FIFA eligibility rules; some limited exceptions apply. Players may hold more than one non-FIFA nationality.

No.	Pos.	Nation	Player
1	GK	USA	Tony Meola
2	MF	USA	Matt McKeon
3	DF	USA	Nick Garcia
4	DF	USA	Mike Burns
5	MF	USA	Kerry Zavagnin
6	DF	USA	Peter Vermes
7	MF	USA	Diego Gutierrez
8	MF	USA	Chris Brown
9	FW	ARG	Darío Fabbro
10	MF	USA	Francisco Gomez
11	MF	USA	Preki
12	FW	TRI	Gary Glasgow

No.	Pos.	Nation	Player
14	DF	USA	Carey Talley
15	FW	USA	Roy Lassiter
16	FW	ENG	Stephen Armstrong
17	MF	USA	Chris Klein
18/28	DF	USA	Chris Brunt
19	MF	USA	Eric Quill
20	DF	USA	Jose Burciaga Jr.
21	FW	RUS	Igor Simutenkov
22	FW	USA	Davy Arnaud
25	GK	USA	Bo Oshoniyi
30	GK	USA	Taly Goode

== Competitions ==
=== Major League Soccer ===
Overall								Home						Away					
Pld	W	D	L	GF	GA	GD	Pts	W	D	L	GF	GA	GD	W	D	L	GF	GA	GD
28	9	9	10	37	45	−8	36	7	3	4	22	21	+1	2	6	6	15	24	−9

Last updated: 2002.
Source: Major League Soccer

Date	Opponents	H / A	Result F – A	Scorers	Attendance
March 23, 2002	Colorado Rapids	H	1–1	Brown
April 13, 2002	San Jose Earthquakes	H	2–0	Klein; Brown
April 20, 2002	D.C. United	A	1–2 (OT)	Preki
April 27, 2002	Dallas Burn	A	1–1	Klein
May 4, 2002	Los Angeles Galaxy	H	1–2 (OT)	Preki
May 11, 2002	Colorado Rapids	A	0–2
May 18, 2002	Los Angeles Galaxy	H	2–1	Gutierrez; Preki
May 25, 2002	MetroStars	A	1–1	Klein
June 1, 2002	Dallas Burn	H	2–2	Fabbro 2
June 8, 2002	San Jose Earthquakes	A	0–3
June 15, 2002	D.C. United	H	2–0	Brown; Armstrong
June 19, 2002	Columbus Crew	A	1–1	Preki
June 22, 2002	New England Revolution	H	3–2	Simutenkov 2 Talley
June 29, 2002	San Jose Earthquakes	A	1–2	Fabbro
July 4, 2002	D.C. United	H	2–1	Fabbro; Talley
July 6, 2002	Dallas Burn	H	1–1	McKeon
July 13, 2002	New England Revolution	A	4–2	Klein 2 Zavagnin; Fabbro
July 20, 2002	Los Angeles Galaxy	A	2–2	Klein; Talley
July 24, 2002	MetroStars	H	1–3	Simutenkov
July 27, 2002	San Jose Earthquakes	H	2–1	Armstrong; Simutenkov
July 31, 2002	Dallas Burn	A	1–0	Armstrong
August 10, 2002	D.C. United	A	0–0
August 14, 2002	Chicago Fire S.C.	A	1–5	Preki
August 18, 2002	Columbus Crew	H	0–4
August 21, 2002	Los Angeles Galaxy	A	1–2	Preki
August 31, 2002	Chicago Fire S.C.	H	2–1	Fabbro; Brown
September 14, 2002	Colorado Rapids	H	1–2	Preki
September 20, 2002	Colorado Rapids	A	1–1	Klein

=== U.S. Open Cup ===
Date	Round	Opponents	H / A	Result F – A	Scorers	Attendance
July 17, 2002	Third Round	Rochester Rhinos	A	3–2 (ASDET)	Fabbro; Simutenkov; Brown
August 24, 2002	Quarterfinals	Milwaukee Rampage	A	2–0	Quill; Preki
September 10, 2002	Semifinals	Columbus Crew	A	2–3 (ASDET)	Own goal Quill

=== MLS Cup Playoffs ===
Date	Round	Opponents	H / A	Result F – A	Scorers	Attendance
September 25, 2002	Conference Semifinals	Los Angeles Galaxy	A	2–3 (OT)	Preki; Brown
September 28, 2002	Conference Semifinals	Los Angeles Galaxy	H	4–1	Simutenkov; Quill; Preki; Fabbro
October 2, 2002	Conference Semifinals	Los Angeles Galaxy	A	2–5	Klein; Preki

=== CONCACAF Champions' Cup ===
Date	Round	Opponents	H / A	Result F – A	Scorers	Attendance
March 3, 2002	First Round	W Connection	A	1–0	Gomez
March 16, 2002	First Round	W Connection	H	2–0	Burns; Preki
April 10, 2002	Quarterfinals	Santos Laguna	A	1–2	Glasgow
April 24, 2002	Quarterfinals	Santos Laguna	H	2–0	Talley; Brown
August 7, 2002	Semifinals	Monarcas Morelia	A	1–6	Fabbro
August 28, 2002	Semifinals	Monarcas Morelia	H	1–1	Brown

== Squad statistics ==
No.	Pos.	Name	MLS		USOC		Playoffs		CCC		Total		Minutes		Discipline	
No.	Pos.	Name	Apps	Goals	Apps	Goals	Apps	Goals	Apps	Goals	Apps	Goals	League	Total	Yellow card	Red card
8	MF	(United States) Chris Brown	28	4	3	1	3	1	6	2	40	8	1512	2333	0	0
5	MF	(United States) Kerry Zavagnin	27	1	3	0	3	0	6	0	39	1	2484	3606	0	0
3	DF	(United States) Nick Garcia	27	0	3	0	3	0	5	0	38	0	2499	3531	0	0
11	FW	(United States) Preki	25	7	3	1	3	3	5	1	36	12	2141	3018	0	0
16	FW	(England) Stephen Armstrong	26	3	3	0	3	0	4	0	36	3	1791	2323	0	0
2	MF	(United States) Matt McKeon	23	1	3	0	2	0	6	0	34	1	1146	1877	0	0
17	MF	(United States) Chris Klein	25	7	3	0	3	1	2	0	33	8	2171	2924	0	0
4	DF	(United States) Mike Burns	24	0	2	0	1	0	6	1	33	1	1966	2680	0	0
14	DF	(United States) Carey Talley	24	3	2	0	3	0	4	1	33	4	1902	2635	0	0
7	MF	(United States) Diego Gutierrez	22	1	1	0	3	0	4	0	30	1	1914	2573	0	0
1	GK	(United States) Tony Meola	17	0	2	0	3	0	6	0	28	0	1519	2551	0	0
10	MF	(United States) Francisco Gomez	20	0	0	0	0	0	6	1	26	1	1249	1448	0	0
21	FW	(Russia) Igor Simutenkov	19	4	2	1	3	1	1	0	25	6	1480	1827	0	0
19	FW	(United States) Eric Quill	16	0	3	2	3	1	3	0	25	3	992	1688	0	0
6	DF	(United States) Peter Vermes	13	0	2	0	3	0	5	0	23	0	1181	2002	0	0
9	FW	(Argentina) Darío Fabbro	16	6	2	1	2	1	2	1	22	9	1116	1507	0	0
25	GK	(United States) Bo Oshoniyi	13	0	0	0	0	0	0	0	13	0	1096	1096	0	0
18/28	--	Chris Brunt	5	0	3	0	0	0	2	0	10	0	158	299	0	0
12	FW	(Trinidad and Tobago) Gary Glasgow	3	0	0	0	0	0	4	1	7	1	174	389	0	0
22	FW	(United States) Davy Arnaud	3	0	2	0	0	0	1	0	6	0	43	178	0	0
15	FW	(United States) Roy Lassiter	2	0	0	0	0	0	3	0	5	0	61	191	0	0
20	DF	(United States) Jose Burciaga Jr.	0	0	0	0	0	0	2	0	2	0	0	102	0	0
30	--	Taly Goode	0	0	1	0	0	0	0	0	1	0	0	90	0	0

Final Statistics
