= Gary Mills (footballer, born 1981) =

English footballer

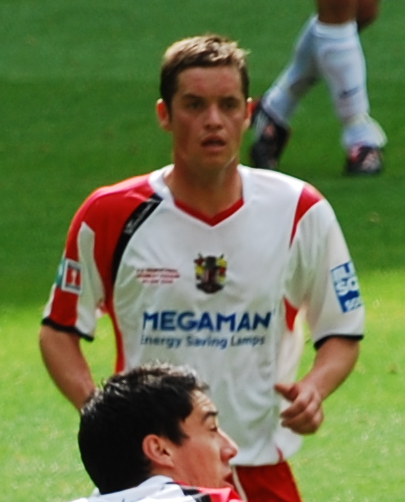
- Mills playing for Stevenage Borough in the 2009 FA Trophy final

Personal information
- Full name: Gary Leonard Mills
- Date of birth: 20 May 1981 (age 45)
- Place of birth: Isle of Sheppey, England
- Height: 5 ft 9 in (1.75 m)
- Position: Midfielder

Youth career
- ?–1997: Coventry City
- 1997–1998: Rushden & Diamonds

Senior career*
Years	Team	Apps	(Gls)
1998–2006	Rushden & Diamonds	124	(2)
2006–2007	Crawley Town	21	(0)
2007	Rushden & Diamonds	17	(0)
2007	Tamworth		
2007–2008	Kettering Town		
2008–2009	Stevenage Borough	30	(1)
2009–2011	Mansfield Town	44	(1)
2010	→ Forest Green Rovers (loan)	2	(0)
2011	Rushden & Diamonds	21	(0)
2011	Bath City	4	(0)
2011–2012	Nuneaton Town	23	(5)
2012–2013	Lincoln City	18	(0)
2013–2014	Boston United	0	(0)
2013–2014	→ King's Lynn Town (loan)	18	(0)
2015	Rugby Town	2	(0)
2016	King's Lynn Town	8	(0)
2020–2021	St Ives Town	0	(0)
Total		330	(9)

Managerial career
- 2015: Rugby Town (player-manager)
- 2016–2017: Corby Town
- 2023–2024: Burton Albion (caretaker)
- * Club domestic league appearances and goals

Gary Leonard Mills (born 20 May 1981) is an English football coach and former player who is the assistant manager at EFL League Two club Port Vale. He was a midfielder during his 18-year playing career, which he mostly spent in non-League football. His son, Harley, is a professional footballer.

Mills began his career at Rushden & Diamonds, helping the club to win the Conference title in 2000–01 and the Third Division title in 2002–03. However, he left Rushden shortly before relegation out of the Football League was confirmed in 2006. He had made 143 appearances in seven seasons at the club. He then spent the next seven years playing in the Conference for Crawley Town, Rushden & Diamonds (in two further spells), Tamworth, Kettering Town, Stevenage Borough, Mansfield Town, Forest Green Rovers (on loan), Bath City, Nuneaton Town, Lincoln City and Boston United. He won the Conference North with Kettering Town in 2007–08 and was promoted out of the Conference North play-offs with Nuneaton Town in 2011–12. He also lifted the FA Trophy with Stevenage Borough in 2008–09, playing in the 2009 FA Trophy final at Wembley Stadium. He went on to play for King's Lynn Town lower down the pyramid.

He turned to coaching, spending seven games in charge at Rugby Town in 2015 and managing Corby Town from October 2016 to April 2017. He coached at Wrexham, King's Lynn Town, Northampton Town, Milton Keynes Dons, Coventry City, Burton Albion, Rotherham United and Port Vale. He took caretaker charge at Burton Albion for part of the 2023–24 season.

== Career ==
=== Rushden & Diamonds ===
Mills spent time in the Academy at Coventry City. He later came through the Rushden & Diamonds youth team and was rated as a £50,000 talent by manager Brian Talbot in December 1999.

In the following season, Mills was part of the Rushden squad that secured promotion to the Football League after winning the Conference.

He scored his first goal for the club in a 2–1 victory over Tranmere Rovers on 25 February 2004.

On 11 September 2004, Mills suffered a dislocated ankle in a league match against Oxford United, leading him to miss the rest of the 2004–05 campaign.

He left Nene Park on 20 April 2006, his contract cancelled by mutual consent, having not played since early February. Rushden's relegation from the Football League was confirmed nine days later.

=== Later career ===
Mills joined fellow Conference National side Crawley Town on 10 August 2006, though he also had an unsuccessful trial with League One side Yeovil Town in July.

Mills rejoined Rushden & Diamonds on 9 January 2007 on a short-term contract.

On 25 May 2007 Mills signed for Conference North side Tamworth, managed by namesake Gary Mills. On 24 October, Mills was sacked by Tamworth following an argument with manager Gary Mills. The manager accused Mills of having "no bottle, no balls, and no discipline", regarding the player's lack of effort and reaction to being dropped from the first team. The player Mills, meanwhile, retorted that Tamworth was "the worst club [I have] ever been at."

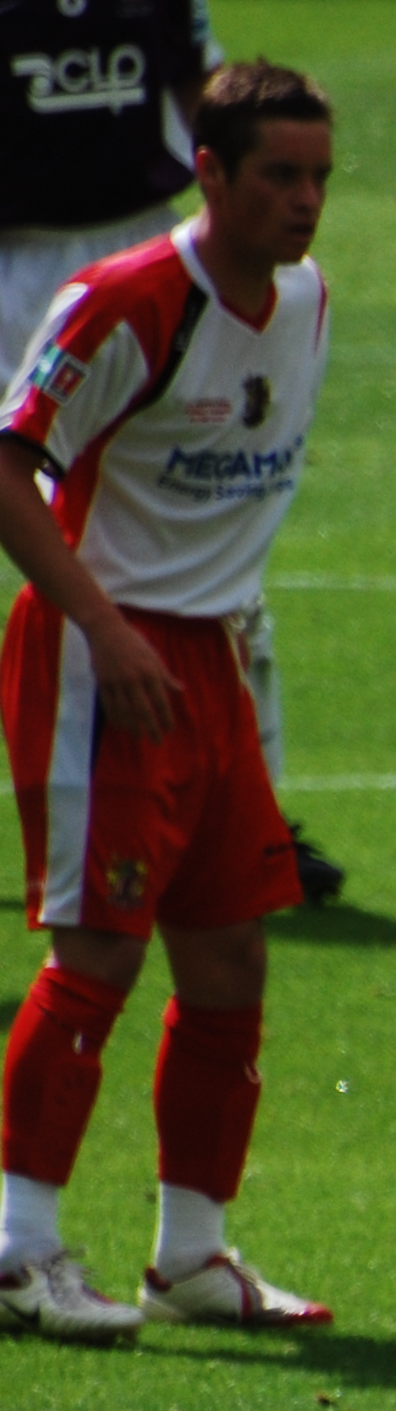
Mills playing for Stevenage Borough in the 2009 FA Trophy final.

Mills signed for Stevenage Borough on 13 May 2008, having been previously managed by manager Graham Westley whilst he was at Rushden & Diamonds. Boro qualified for the Conference Premier play-offs, losing out 4–3 on aggregate to Cambridge United in the semi-finals.

On 26 May 2009, Mills rejected a contract offer from Stevenage Borough to sign for Mansfield Town on a two-year deal. He was appointed as team captain, though was made available for loan in January 2010 after three months out of the first XI. He was replaced as captain by Luke Foster, though managed to return to the starting line-up by the end of the 2009–10 season.

In October 2010, Mills signed for fellow Conference side Forest Green Rovers on a one-month loan deal. He left Mansfield by mutual consent on 12 January 2011.

On 13 January 2011, Mills was signed by Rushden & Diamonds manager Justin Edinburgh for his third spell at the club. He said that "I'm delighted to be back. I never wanted to leave".

Mills joined Bath City on a one-year deal on 23 May 2011. He played four games before finding himself surplus to requirements at Twerton Park.

After leaving Bath, Mills signed for Conference North outfit, Nuneaton Town. On 13 May 2012, Mills was a part of the Nuneaton side that was victorious in the Conference North play-off final to earn promotion to the Conference National.

On 21 May 2012, Mills signed a one-year contract with Lincoln City. He was named as team captain by manager David Holdsworth. He left the club by mutual consent on 4 March 2013, three months after sustaining a serious knee injury.

In May 2013, Mills joined Boston United, though only featured in one Lincolnshire Senior Cup game. In August 2013, he joined King's Lynn Town, managed by former Rushden teammate Gary Setchell, on a three-month loan deal.

== Style of play ==
Mills was a midfielder who harassed and pressured opponents, breaking up play and passing the ball on to teammates.

== Coaching career ==
Mills was assistant manager to Kevin Wilkin at Wrexham from May 2014 until March 2015, when he and Wilkin both left the club following defeat in the 2015 FA Trophy final. Mills was appointed as manager at Northern Premier League Division One South club Rugby Town on 13 May 2015. He won one of his seven league games in charge. He played two league games. He resigned on 11 September.

In June 2016, Mills returned to his former club, King's Lynn Town, as player-coach. He was promoted to assistant manager in September 2016. On 19 October 2016, Mills was appointed as the manager of Southern League Division One Central side Corby Town. He was sacked on 9 April 2017 after a run of five games without a win that left the Steelman 21st in the table.

He then joined Northampton Town within their academy set-up as the lead coach at under-16 level. He joined St Ives Town as a coach in July 2020. In December 2022, he was appointed lead professional development coach at Coventry City, joining the club from Milton Keynes Dons where he had held a similar position. In September 2023, Mills was appointed first-team coach at League One club Burton Albion. Following the sacking of Dino Maamria on 9 December 2023, Mills was appointed caretaker manager. He returned to his role of first-team coach following the appointment of Martin Paterson on 11 January 2024. On 31 May 2024, Mills departed Burton Albion following the departure of Paterson. He joined Steve Evans coaching staff at Rotherham United in July 2024, departing alongside Evans in March 2025. He returned to his coaching role at Milton Keynes Dons. He joined Port Vale as assistant to new manager Jon Brady in January 2026.

== Personal life ==
His son, Harley, turned professional at Peterborough United.

== Career statistics ==
=== Playing statistics ===
Appearances and goals by club, season and competition
Club	Season	League			FA Cup		League Cup		Other		Total	
Club	Season	Division	Apps	Goals	Apps	Goals	Apps	Goals	Apps	Goals	Apps	Goals
Rushden & Diamonds	1999–2000	Conference	16	0	0	0	—		0	0	16	0
Rushden & Diamonds	2000–01	Conference	21	0	1	0	—		2 (Note: 1 appearance in the Football League Trophy and 1 appearances in the Conference Trophy)	0	24	0
Rushden & Diamonds	2001–02	Third Division	9	0	0	0	2	0	1 (Note: Appearance in the Football League Trophy)	0	12	0
Rushden & Diamonds	2002–03	Third Division	30	0	2	0	2	0	1	0	35	0
Rushden & Diamonds	2003–04	Second Division	30	1	1	0	1	0	2	0	34	1
Rushden & Diamonds	2004–05	League Two	7	1	0	0	1	0	0	0	8	1
Rushden & Diamonds	2005–06	League Two	11	0	2	0	0	0	1	0	14	0
Rushden & Diamonds	Total		124	2	6	0	6	0	7	0	143	2
Crawley Town	2006–07	Conference National	21	0	0	0	—		0	0	21	0
Rushden & Diamonds	2006–07	Conference National	17	0	—		—		0	0	17	0
Stevenage Borough	2008–09	Conference Premier	30	1	2	0	—		7 (Note: 4 appearances in the FA Trophy and 2 appearances in the play-offs)	0	39	1
Mansfield Town	2009–10	Conference Premier	26	0	3	0	—		0	0	29	0
Mansfield Town	2010–11	Conference Premier	18	1	0	0	—		0	0	18	1
Mansfield Town	Total		44	1	3	0	0	0	0	0	47	1
Forest Green Rovers (loan)	2010–11	Conference Premier	2	0	0	0	—		0	0	2	0
Rushden & Diamonds	2010–11	Conference Premier	21	0	—		—		0	0	21	0
Bath City	2011–12	Conference Premier	4	0	0	0	—		0	0	4	0
Nuneaton Town	2011–12	Conference North	23	5	—		—		1 (Note: Appearance in the Birmingham Senior Cup)	0	24	5
Lincoln City	2012–13	Conference Premier	18	0	4	0	—		0	0	22	0
Boston United	2013–14	Conference North	0	0	0	0	—		1 (Note: Appearance in the Lincolnshire Senior Cup)	0	1	0
King's Lynn Town (loan)	2013–14	Northern Premier League; Premier Division	18	0	2	0	—		0	0	20	0
Rugby Town	2015–16	Northern Premier League; Division One South	2	0	0	0	—		0	0	2	0
King's Lynn Town	2016–17	Southern League; Premier Division	8	0	2	1	—		1	0	11	1
St Ives Town	2020–21	Southern League; Premier Division Central	0	0	0	0	—		0	0	0	0
Career total			332	9	19	1	6	0	17	0	374	10

=== Managerial statistics ===
Managerial record by team and tenure
Team	From	To	Record					Ref
Team	From	To	P	W	D	L	Win %	Ref
Burton Albion (caretaker)	9 December 2023	11 January 2024	8	2	2	4	25.0	

== Honours ==
Rushden & Diamonds

- Football League Third Division: 2002–03
- Football Conference: 2000–01

Kettering Town

- Conference North: 2007–08

Stevenage Borough

- FA Trophy: 2008–09

Nuneaton Town

- Conference North play-offs: 2012
