= Darío Fabbro =

Argentine footballer

Personal information
- Full name: Darío Raúl Fabbro
- Date of birth: 11 March 1976 (age 50)
- Place of birth: General Deheza, Argentina
- Height: 1.88 m (6 ft 2 in)
- Position: Striker

Senior career*
Years	Team	Apps	(Gls)
1995–1997	Huracán	22	(2)
1998	Almagro	3	(0)
1999–2000	Godoy Cruz	11	(1)
2000–2001	Emelec	21	(0)
2001–2002	Deportes Concepción		
2002–2003	Kansas City Wizards	24	(6)
2003	New England Revolution	8	(2)
2004–2005	Temperley	10	(1)
2006–2007	Platense FC		
- * Club domestic league appearances and goals

Darío Raúl Fabbro (born 11 March 1976) is an Argentine former professional footballer who played as a striker. He played in the MLS for Kansas City Wizards and New England Revolution, in Honduras for Platense, in Chile for Deportes Concepción, among other clubs.

== Career ==
Fabbro started his career with Club Atlético Huracán in Argentina before playing for C.S. Emelec of Ecuadorian Serie A, where he appeared in the 2000 Merconorte Cup. He also played for Deportes Concepción of the Chilean Primera División. He played with the Kansas City Wizards of Major League Soccer during their spring training visit to Argentina in early March 2002, scoring twice and assisting once.

Fabbro officially signed for the Wizards in April of the 2002 season as a "discovery player," occupying the club's 18th and final senior roster spot and third and final foreigner spot. During his tenure with the Wizards, he scored six goals in sixteen appearances, including a brace against the Dallas Burn on 1 June 2002. He was the first Argentine to ever suit up for the club.

On 21 August 2003, the New England Revolution acquired Fabbro and striker Chris Brown from the Kansas City Wizards in exchange for Wolde Harris, Jorge Gabriel Vázquez, and a conditional SuperDraft pick.

Fabbro made his Revolution debut in a 2–1 loss to the LA Galaxy on 23 August 2003. While a member of the Revolution, Fabbro recorded three goals. He scored them in three straight games, all of which were against the MetroStars, on 18 October, 25, and then in game one of the Eastern Conference Semifinal on 1 November. He provided an assist to Pat Noonan in the second leg of the tie, helping the Revolution advance to the Eastern Conference Final for the second time in the club's history.

== Personal life ==
His brother is the also former footballer Jonathan Fabbro.

== Post-retirement ==
Fabbro has served as a football agent.
