= Onandi Lowe =

Jamaican footballer (born 1974)

Personal information
- Full name: Onandi Lowe
- Date of birth: 2 December 1974 (age 51)
- Place of birth: Kingston, Jamaica
- Height: 6 ft 3 in (1.91 m)
- Positions: Forward; utility player

Youth career
- 1993–1996: Harbour View

Senior career*
Years	Team	Apps	(Gls)
1996–1997	Montreal Impact	26	(16)
1997–1998	Waterhouse	30	(14)
1998–1999	Arnett Gardens	10	(8)
1999	Richmond Kickers	16	(15)
2000–2001	Rochester Raging Rhinos	19	(5)
2001	Kansas City Wizards	13	(4)
2001	→ Port Vale (loan)	5	(1)
2001–2002	→ Rushden & Diamonds (loan)	12	(7)
2002–2004	Rushden & Diamonds	78	(42)
2004	Coventry City	2	(1)
2004–2005	Arnett Gardens		(2)
2005–2007	Portmore United		
2006	→ Miami FC (loan)	0	(0)
2008	Arnett Gardens		(2)
Total		211+	(114+)

International career
- Jamaica U17
- Jamaica U20
- Jamaica U23
1995–2004	Jamaica	81	(27)

Managerial career
- 2010: August Town
- * Club domestic league appearances and goals

Onandi Lowe (born 2 December 1974), also known as Nandi, is a Jamaican former international footballer who played in every outfield position, but was best known as a prolific forward. He spent some of his career in the top flight Jamaica National Premier League and had stints in North America and England. He scored 27 goals in 65 international appearances and appeared at the 1998 FIFA World Cup. However, he found himself on the wrong side of the law with drugs in the latter part of his career and has been described as "one of Jamaica's most controversial players". His son, Damion Lowe, is also a professional footballer.

He started his career at Harbour View, before joining Canadian side Montreal Impact in 1996. He returned to Jamaica with Waterhouse the following year before signing with the American side Richmond Kickers via Arnett Gardens in 1999. He then helped Rochester Raging Rhinos to win the A-League in 2000. He joined Kansas City Wizards the following year and also had a brief spell on loan at English side Port Vale. He signed with Rushden & Diamonds in February 2002 and hit 49 goals in 90 league games. He transferred to Coventry City in March 2004 before returning to Jamaican side Arnett Gardens later in the year following his arrest by British police. He later played for Portmore United, Miami FC, and Arnett Gardens again, before he retired in 2008.

== Club career ==
After leaving Dunoon Technical High in his hometown of Kingston, Lowe joined Harbour View, a top Jamaican club, in 1993. A big, versatile free-kick specialist who could play anywhere on the pitch and was known for his strong left foot, Lowe moved to Canada in 1996 to join Montreal Impact. He helped Impact to the A-League's Northeast Division final in 1997, scoring twice against Toronto Lynx in the semi-finals. He returned to Jamaica after two seasons with Impact, joining Waterhouse and then Arnett Gardens. He moved back to the A-League with Richmond Kickers, scoring 15 goals and gaining seven assists in 1999. He played for Rochester Raging Rhinos in 2000 and scored in the tournament's final, in a 3–1 win over Minnesota Thunder at Frontier Field.

In 2001, he tried his luck in Europe, joining Port Vale on loan for the end of the 2000–01 season. However, his deal at Vale Park was not made permanent after he quit the club when chairman Bill Bell refused to provide him with a car; when a reporter asked if he was upset about paying the wages of a player that had absconded, Bell replied "dunner worry kid, we won't be paying him". He scored two goals for Port Vale, the first against Darlington in the Football League Trophy; Vale would go on to win the trophy in his absence. He scored once in a league game against Cambridge United. He spent the rest of the year with Kansas City Wizards and scored eight goals in 20 games.

Lowe joined Rushden & Diamonds of the Football League Third Division on loan in December 2001, then signed permanently with "Diamonds" in February 2002. He spent two years with the club, during which time he made close to 100 appearances, keeping a goalscoring rate of better than one every two games, making him a crowd favourite at Nene Park. This record includes a hat-trick against Mansfield Town at Field Mill on 30 March 2002, as part of the club's run to the play-off final, which ended in a 3–1 defeat to Cheltenham Town at the Millennium Stadium. He went on to score 16 goals in 42 games in 2002–03, as the club finished as the division's champions. Moving on to Coventry City in March 2004, he got off to a bad start with manager Eric Black after failing to report for duty following an international game. He scored once against Crewe Alexandra in two matches before he was released at the end of the 2003–04 season due to his ongoing drug trial.

Returning to Jamaica with old club Arnett Gardens, he attempted to return to England with Peterborough United in March 2005 and ran into problems gaining a work permit; rejection for his permit also prevented him a move to Oxford United later in the year. He started the 2006 season with Miami FC in the US, only to be released after a month because of disciplinary problems. After two years with Portmore United he rejoined Arnett in the Jamaica National Premier League during the January 2008 transfer window.

== International career ==
Lowe debuted for the Jamaica in 1995. He went on to play at the 1995 Caribbean Cup, scoring in a 2–1 win over Saint Lucia at The National Stadium. He also scored at the 1996 Caribbean Cup, winning Jamaica's consolidation goal in a 3–1 defeat to Suriname at the Hasely Crawford Stadium. He formed a prolific strike partnership with Walter Boyd in the "Reggae Boyz" "Road To France Campaign" in 1998. He then found himself in and out of the team for mainly disciplinary reasons. He played two matches at the 1998 World Cup, the 3–1 defeat to Croatia and the 2–1 win over Japan, after being selected by coach René Simões. He went on to score twice in his country's success at the 1998 Caribbean Cup, against Netherlands Antilles in a group win, as well as the only goal of the semi-final clash with Antigua and Barbuda.

He featured in qualification for the 2002 World Cup, scoring against Costa Rica and Trinidad and Tobago in June 2001. He featured in the 2003 CONCACAF Gold Cup. He scored and was then sent off in a 2–0 win over Guatemala at the Miami Orange Bowl. Jamaica went on to lose 5–0 to Mexico at the quarter-final stage. His last international was a March 2004 friendly match against Honduras in which he also scored a goal. During his 2004 drug trial, he was suspended from international duty, and despite being cleared of the charges in 2005, the 31-year-old Lowe was not selected again. He earned 65 caps for his country.

== Legal troubles ==
British police arrested Lowe in April 2004 for trafficking £117,000 worth of crack cocaine; he denied the charges. The exact charge was 'attempting to possess 1.17 kg (2.5 lb) of crack cocaine with intent to supply'. The Prosecution claimed he signed for the package under the fake name of "Kevin Brown" and intended to profit financially from knowingly trafficking the drugs. Lowe countered that the fake name was to avoid paparazzi and that he had no idea about the contents of the package: "I am Jamaican, maybe you think differently. If I am a mate and you said, 'can you do that for me', I am not going to think anything bad of you." Lowe said in a police interview: "I thought he was a friend". In February 2005, he was cleared as the charges were dismissed for lack of evidence.

He was arrested and charged in St Catherine in December 2007 for possession of marijuana. He had been driving a car with 42 marijuana cigarettes, he posted the $300 bail and was released from custody.

== Coaching career ==
After completing his JFF coaching certification, Lowe coached briefly with August Town in the National Premier League.

== Career statistics ==
=== Club ===
Appearances and goals by club, season and competition
Club	Season	League			FA Cup		Other		Total	
Club	Season	Division	Apps	Goals	Apps	Goals	Apps	Goals	Apps	Goals
Montreal Impact	1996	A-League	14	9						
Montreal Impact	1997	USISL A-League	12	7						
Montreal Impact	Total		26	16						
Waterhouse	1997–98	National Premier League	30	14						
Arnett Gardens	1998–99	National Premier League	10	8						
Richmond Kickers	1999	USL A-League	16	15						
Rochester Raging Rhinos	2000	USL A-League	19	5						
Kansas City Wizards	2001	Major League Soccer	13	4						
Port Vale (loan)	2000–01	Second Division	5	1	—		1	1	6	2
Rushden & Diamonds	2001–02	Third Division	25	19	1	0	3	1	29	20
Rushden & Diamonds	2002–03	Third Division	39	15	2	1	1	0	42	16
Rushden & Diamonds	2003–04	Second Division	26	15	0	0	1	1	27	16
Rushden & Diamonds	Total		90	49	3	1	5	2	98	52
Coventry City	2003–04	First Division	2	1	0	0	0	0	2	1
Miami FC	2006	USL First Division	0	0						

=== International ===
Appearances and goals by national team and year
National team	Year	Apps	Goals
Jamaica	1995	10	3
Jamaica	1996	17	3
Jamaica	1997	2	0
Jamaica	1998	16	2
Jamaica	1999	6	0
Jamaica	2000	10	9
Jamaica	2001	10	5
Jamaica	2002	1	0
Jamaica	2003	7	3
Jamaica	2004	2	2
Total		81	27

Scores and results list Jamaica's' goal tally first, score column indicates score after each Lowe goal.

List of international goals scored by Onandi Lowe
No.	Date	Venue	Opponent	Score	Result	Competition	Ref.
1	19 July 1995	National Stadium, Kingston, Jamaica	Saint Lucia	1–0	2–1	1995 Caribbean Cup	
2	1 August 1995	Varsity Stadium, Toronto, Canada	Canada	1–0	1–3	Friendly	
3	6 December 1995	Warner Park Sporting Complex, Basseterre, Saint Kitts and Nevis	Saint Kitts and Nevis	3–0	3–0	Friendly	
4	28 May 1996	Hasely Crawford Stadium, Port of Spain, Trinidad and Tobago	Suriname	1–3	1–3	1996 Caribbean Cup	
5	4 September 1996	National Stadium, Kingston, Jamaica	Costa Rica	2–0	2–0	Friendly	
6	4 October 1996	Estadio Bellavista, Ambato, Ecuador	Ecuador	1–1	1–2	Friendly	
7	24 July 1998	National Stadium, Kingston, Jamaica	Netherlands Antilles	1–0	3–2	1998 Caribbean Cup	
8	29 July 1998	Hasely Crawford Stadium, Port of Spain, Trinidad and Tobago	Antigua and Barbuda	1–0	1–0	1998 Caribbean Cup	
9	5 July 2000	National Stadium, Kingston, Jamaica	Barbados	2–0	5–0	Friendly	
10	5 July 2000	National Stadium, Kingston, Jamaica	Barbados	3–0	5–0	Friendly	
11	8 July 2000	Hasely Crawford Stadium, Port of Spain, Trinidad and Tobago	Trinidad and Tobago	1–1	4–2	Friendly	
12	8 July 2000	Hasely Crawford Stadium, Port of Spain, Trinidad and Tobago	Trinidad and Tobago	2–1	4–2	Friendly	
13	8 July 2000	Hasely Crawford Stadium, Port of Spain, Trinidad and Tobago	Trinidad and Tobago	4–2	4–2	Friendly	
14	16 July 2000	Arnos Vale Stadium, Arnos Vale, Saint Vincent and the Grenadines	Saint Vincent and the Grenadines	1–0	1–0	2002 FIFA World Cup qualification	
15	23 July 2000	National Stadium, Kingston, Jamaica	Honduras	2–1	3–1	2002 FIFA World Cup qualification	
16	16 August 2000	National Stadium, Kingston, Jamaica	El Salvador	1–0	1–0	2002 FIFA World Cup qualification	
17	3 September 2000	National Stadium, Kingston, Jamaica	Saint Vincent and the Grenadines	2–0	2–0	2002 FIFA World Cup qualification	
18	27 January 2001	Miami Orange Bowl, Miami, United States	Bolivia	1–0	3–0	Friendly	
19	10 June 2001	National Stadium, Kingston, Jamaica	Cuba	1–0	4–1	Friendly	
20	10 June 2001	National Stadium, Kingston, Jamaica	Cuba	4–1	4–1	Friendly	
21	20 June 2001	Estadio Alejandro Morera Soto, Alajuela, Costa Rica	Costa Rica	1–1	1–2	2002 FIFA World Cup qualification	
22	30 June 2001	Queen's Park Oval, Port of Spain, Trinidad and Tobago	Trinidad and Tobago	1–1	2–1	2002 FIFA World Cup qualification	
23	12 February 2003	National Stadium, Kingston, Jamaica	United States	1–2	1–2	Friendly	
24	25 May 2003	National Stadium, Kingston, Jamaica	Nigeria	1–0	3–2	Friendly	
25	15 July 2003	Miami Orange Bowl, Miami, United States	Guatemala	1–0	2–0	2003 CONCACAF Gold Cup	
26	18 February 2004	National Stadium, Kingston, Jamaica	Uruguay	1–0	2–0	Friendly	
27	31 March 2004	National Stadium, Kingston, Jamaica	Honduras	1–0	2–2	Friendly	

== Honours ==
Rochester Raging Rhinos

- A-League: 2000

Rushden & Diamonds

- Football League Third Division: 2002–03

Jamaica

- Caribbean Cup: 1998
