= Owen Story =

English footballer

Personal information
- Full name: Owen Story
- Date of birth: 3 August 1984 (age 42)
- Place of birth: Burton upon Trent, England
- Position: Right midfielder

Team information
- Current team: Melton Town

Youth career
- Leicester Nirvana
- Rushden & Diamonds

Senior career*
Years	Team	Apps	(Gls)
2003–2004	Rushden & Diamonds	5	(0)
2004–2005	Team Bath		
2005	Torquay United	2	(0)
2005	Bath City		
2005–2008	Hinckley United	110	(23)
2008–2009	Redditch United		
2009	King's Lynn		
2010–2013	Brackley Town		
2013	Leamington		
2013–2015	Brackley Town		
2015–2018	Barwell		
2018–2019	Bedworth United		
2019–	Melton Town		
- * Club domestic league appearances and goals

Owen Story (born 3 August 1984 in Burton upon Trent) is an English footballer who plays for Leicestershire Senior League Premier Division side Melton Town, where he plays as a forward.

== Playing career ==
Story began his career as a trainee with Rushden & Diamonds, turning professional in February 2003. He made his league debut, as a substitute for Duane Darby, on 20 September 2003, a 2–1 defeat away to AFC Bournemouth and played five more times for the Rushden first team, all as substitute, before leaving at the end of that season.

He subsequently played for Team Bath before joining Torquay United in January 2005. He played just twice for Torquay before being released.

On his release, he returned to Bath, joining Bath City in April 2005 from where he joined Hinckley United later that season.

He played over 100 games for Hinckley, in a number of roles from right midfield, left midfield, striker and even right back.

He left to join Redditch United in 2008.

On 14 November 2018 Barwell confirmed that Story had left the club to join fellow Southern League Premier Central side Bedworth United.
