= Brett Solkhon =

English footballer

Personal information
- Full name: Brett Michael Solkhon
- Date of birth: 12 September 1982 (age 44)
- Place of birth: Canvey Island, England
- Positions: Defender; midfielder

Team information
- Current team: St Ives Town (on dual registration from Kettering Town)

Youth career
- Ipswich Town
- Arsenal

Senior career*
Years	Team	Apps	(Gls)
2000–2003	Rushden & Diamonds	3	(0)
2002–2003	→ Canvey Island (loan)		
2003–2009	Kettering Town	237	(33)
2009–2010	Corby Town	28	(3)
2010	Brackley Town	8	(1)
2010–2011	Kettering Town	43	(7)
2011–2014	Brackley Town	119	(11)
2014–	Kettering Town	216	(56)
2020–	St Ives Town (dual)	1	(0)
- * Club domestic league appearances and goals as of 16:00, 23 November 2019 (UTC)

Brett Michael Solkhon (born 12 September 1982) is an English footballer who plays for Northern Premier League Division One Midlands side St Ives Town, on dual registration from Southern League Premier Division Central side Kettering Town, where he plays as a defender.

== Playing career ==
=== Ipswich Town & Arsenal ===
Born on Canvey Island, England, Solkhon was born at Rochford hospital in Essex and attended Castle View School on Canvey Island from 1994 to 1999.

He played at youth level for Ipswich Town and Arsenal.

=== Rushden & Diamonds ===
Brett signed for Rushden & Diamonds in 2000 where he played for two seasons, helping them to secure promotion to the Conference National. Solkhon made 9 appearances in all competitions, he was also loaned out to Canvey Island for the 2002–03 season.

=== Kettering Town ===
Solkhon signed for Kettering Town in 2003 and became their longest serving player of nearly five years. He played in many historic Kettering FA Cup matches, most notably against Notts County against whom he scored and got an assist in a 2–1 win, and Fulham to whom Kettering lost 2–4, with 2 goals from Craig Westcarr. He was released by Kettering in May 2009.

=== Corby Town ===
Solkhon signed for newly promoted Corby Town in the Conference North on 22 May 2009. He made 28 appearances and scored three goals during the 2009–10 season, but departed the club in March 2010.

=== Brackley Town ===
Brett moved to Brackley Town in 2011, where he was a part of their Southern League Premier Division championship winning side. In 2014.

=== Kettering Town ===
Solkhon once again rejoined Kettering Town for his third spell, winning the Southern League Division One Central title in his first season.

Brett agreed to re-sign for Kettering Town for the 2018–19 season.

=== St Ives Town ===
Solkhon joined Southern League Premier Central side St Ives Town on dual registration in September 2020.

== Personal life ==
=== Betting scandal ===
On 31 July 2015, it was revealed that Solkhon, and a teammate, Elliot Sandy had been involved in betting, and consequently were charged by the FA. These bets related to the Estonia Meistriliiga, Gambon Championnat and Moldova Divizia B.

== Career statistics ==
=== Club ===
As of match played 30 September 2020

Appearances and goals by club, season and competition
Club	Season	League			National Cup		League Cup		Other		Total	
Club	Season	Division	Apps	Goals	Apps	Goals	Apps	Goals	Apps	Goals	Apps	Goals
Rushden & Diamonds	1999–00	Conference National	1	0	0	0	—		0	0	1	0
Rushden & Diamonds	2000–01	Football League Third Division	1	0	0	0	0	0	0	0	1	0
Rushden & Diamonds	2001–02	Football League Third Division	1	0	0	0	0	0	0	0	1	0
Rushden & Diamonds	Rushden & Diamonds		3	0	0	0	0	0	0	0	3	0
Canvey Island (loan)	2002–03	Isthmian League Premier Division	—	—	0	0	—		0	0	—	—
Kettering Town	2002–03	Conference National	12	1	0	0	—		0	0	12	1
Kettering Town	2003–04	Isthmian League Premier Division	42	5	0	0	—		0	0	42	5
Kettering Town	2004–05	Conference North	35	3	0	0	—		0	0	35	3
Kettering Town	2005–06	Conference North	31	2	0	0	—		0	0	31	2
Kettering Town	2006–07	Conference North	38	11	0	0	—		0	0	38	11
Kettering Town	2007–08	Conference North	42	10	0	0	—		0	0	42	10
Kettering Town	2008–09	Conference National	37	1	0	0	—		0	0	37	1
Kettering Town	Kettering Town		286	46	0	0	—	—	0	0	286	46
Corby Town	2009–10	National League North	28	3	0	0	—		0	0	28	3
Brackley Town	2009–10	Southern League Premier Division	8	1	0	0	—		0	0	8	1
Kettering Town	2010–11	Conference National	43	7	0	0	—		0	0	43	7
Brackley Town	2011–12	Southern League Premier Division	42	5	0	0	—		0	0	42	5
Brackley Town	2012–13	National League North	35	1	0	0	—		0	0	35	1
Brackley Town	2013–14	National League North	42	5	0	0	—		0	0	42	5
Brackley Town	Brackley Town		119	11	0	0	—	—	0	0	119	11
Kettering Town	2014–15	Southern League Division One Central	41	11	0	0	—		0	0	41	11
Kettering Town	2015–16	Southern League Premier Division	41	6	0	0	—		0	0	41	6
Kettering Town	2016–17	Southern League Premier Division	37	5	0	0	—		0	0	37	5
Kettering Town	2017–18	Southern League Premier Division	41	22	0	0	—		0	0	41	22
Kettering Town	2018–19	Southern League Premier Central	37	10	0	0	—		0	0	37	10
Kettering Town	2019–20	National League North	19	2	0	0	—		0	0	19	2
Kettering Town	Kettering Town		216	56	0	0	—	—	0	0	216	56
St Ives Town (dual)	2020–21	Southern League Premier Central	1	0	0	0	—		0	0	1	0
Career total			655	111	0	0	0	0	0	0	655	111

== Honours ==
=== Club ===
Rushden & Diamonds

- Conference National: 2000–01

Kettering Town

- Conference North: 2007–08
- Southern League Division One Central: 2014–15
- Hillier Cup: 2016–17, 2017–18
- Southern League Premier Central: 2018–19

Brackley Town

- Southern League Premier Division: 2011–12
