= 2006–07 Football Conference =

Football Conference
- Season: 2006-07

The 2006–07 season was the 28th season of the Football Conference.

== Overview ==
This season saw the promotion of Dagenham & Redbridge and Morecambe to the Football League for the first time, whilst Droylsden, Farsley Celtic, Histon and Salisbury City were promoted to the Conference National for the first time in their history.

At the end of the season Scarborough and Farnborough Town went out of business, whilst Hayes and Yeading merged to form a new club, Hayes & Yeading United and Moor Green merged with Southern League side Solihull Borough to form Solihull Moors (which took Moor Green's place in the Conference North).

Oxford United drew the biggest crowds, with an average of 6,332 spectators and a peak of 11,065 in their match against Woking. Exeter City came second far behind them, with an average of 3,627, just beating Oxford's average with a peak of 6,670 in their match against Southport. Other teams could not match Oxford's average even in their most popular matches.

== Conference National ==
Conference National
- Season: 2006–07
- Champions: Dagenham & Redbridge (1st Football Conference title)
- Direct promotion: Dagenham & Redbridge
- Promoted through play-offs: Morecambe
- Relegated to Conference North/Conference South: St Albans City, Southport, Tamworth
- Promoted for the next season: Droylsden, Farsley Celtic, Histon, Salisbury City
- Matches: 552
- Goals: 1,412 (2.56 per match)
- Top goalscorer: Paul Benson (Dagenham & Redbridge), 28
- Biggest home win: Cambridge United – Weymouth 7–0 (31 March 2007)
- Biggest away win: St Albans City – Grays Athletic 0–6 (21 October 2006)
- Highest scoring: Forest Green Rovers – Stevenage Borough 4–4 (9Apr 2007); St Albans City – Aldershot 3–5 (19 August 2006)
- Longest winning run: ?
- Longest unbeaten run: Oxford United, 17 matches
- Longest losing run: ?
- Highest attendance: Oxford United v Woking, 11,065 (26 December 2006)
- Lowest attendance: ?
- Average attendance: 1,914 (6 short of Conference record; + 6% compared with the previous season)

A total of 24 teams contested the division, including 18 sides from last season, two relegated from the Football League Two, two promoted from the Conference North and two promoted from the Conference South.

=== Promotion and relegation ===
Teams promoted from 2005–06 Conference North

- Northwich Victoria
- Stafford Rangers

Teams promoted from 2005–06 Conference South

- Weymouth
- St Albans City

Teams relegated from 2005–06 Football League Two

- Oxford United
- Rushden & Diamonds

=== League table ===
| Pos | Team | Pld | W | D | L | GF | GA | GD | Pts | Promotion or relegation |
|---|---|---|---|---|---|---|---|---|---|---|
| 1 | Dagenham & Redbridge (C, P) | 46 | 28 | 11 | 7 | 93 | 48 | +45 | 95 | Promotion to Football League Two |
| 2 | Oxford United | 46 | 22 | 15 | 9 | 66 | 33 | +33 | 81 | Qualification for the Conference National play-offs |
| 3 | Morecambe (O, P) | 46 | 23 | 12 | 11 | 64 | 46 | +18 | 81 | Qualification for the Conference National play-offs |
| 4 | York City | 46 | 23 | 11 | 12 | 65 | 45 | +20 | 80 | Qualification for the Conference National play-offs |
| 5 | Exeter City | 46 | 22 | 12 | 12 | 67 | 48 | +19 | 78 | Qualification for the Conference National play-offs |
| 6 | Burton Albion | 46 | 22 | 9 | 15 | 52 | 47 | +5 | 75 | |
| 7 | Gravesend & Northfleet | 46 | 21 | 11 | 14 | 63 | 56 | +7 | 74 | |
| 8 | Stevenage Borough | 46 | 20 | 10 | 16 | 76 | 66 | +10 | 70 | |
| 9 | Aldershot Town | 46 | 18 | 11 | 17 | 64 | 62 | +2 | 65 | |
| 10 | Kidderminster Harriers | 46 | 17 | 12 | 17 | 43 | 50 | −7 | 63 | |
| 11 | Weymouth | 46 | 18 | 9 | 19 | 56 | 73 | −17 | 63 | |
| 12 | Rushden & Diamonds | 46 | 17 | 11 | 18 | 58 | 54 | +4 | 62 | |
| 13 | Northwich Victoria | 46 | 18 | 4 | 24 | 51 | 69 | −18 | 58 | |
| 14 | Forest Green Rovers | 46 | 13 | 18 | 15 | 59 | 64 | −5 | 57 | |
| 15 | Woking | 46 | 15 | 12 | 19 | 56 | 61 | −5 | 57 | |
| 16 | Halifax Town | 46 | 15 | 10 | 21 | 55 | 62 | −7 | 55 | |
| 17 | Cambridge United | 46 | 15 | 10 | 21 | 57 | 66 | −9 | 55 | |
| 18 | Crawley Town | 46 | 17 | 12 | 17 | 52 | 52 | 0 | 53 (Note: Crawley Town were deducted 10 points for entering administration.) | |
| 19 | Grays Athletic | 46 | 13 | 13 | 20 | 56 | 55 | +1 | 52 | |
| 20 | Stafford Rangers | 46 | 14 | 10 | 22 | 49 | 71 | −22 | 52 | |
| 21 | Altrincham | 46 | 13 | 12 | 21 | 53 | 67 | −14 | 51 | Reprieved from relegation (Note: Altrincham were reprieved from relegation due to Boston United's double relegation from Football League Two.) |
| 22 | Tamworth (R) | 46 | 13 | 9 | 24 | 43 | 61 | −18 | 48 | Relegation to Conference North |
| 23 | Southport (R) | 46 | 11 | 14 | 21 | 57 | 67 | −10 | 47 | Relegation to Conference North |
| 24 | St Albans City (R) | 46 | 10 | 10 | 26 | 57 | 89 | −32 | 40 | Relegation to Conference South |

(C) Champions; (O) Play-off winners; (P) Promoted; (R) Relegated

=== Locations ===
Locations of the Conference National 2006–2007 teams
Locations of the Conference National London teams 2006–2007

=== Results ===
| Home \ Away | ALD | ALT | BRT | CAM | CRA | D&R | EXE | FGR | GRN | GRY | HAL | KID | MOR | NOR | OXF | R&D | SOU | STA | SAC | STB | TAM | WEY | WOK | YOR |
|---|---|---|---|---|---|---|---|---|---|---|---|---|---|---|---|---|---|---|---|---|---|---|---|---|
| Aldershot | | 0–0 | 3–2 | 0–1 | 0–2 | 1–1 | 3–2 | 2–1 | 3–2 | 1–0 | 1–0 | 4–2 | 0–1 | 1–3 | 1–1 | 2–2 | 2–2 | 4–2 | 2–0 | 4–0 | 3–3 | 0–1 | 2–2 | 0–2 |
| Altrincham | 0–0 | | 2–3 | 5–0 | 1–1 | 0–5 | 1–2 | 2–2 | 0–2 | 1–0 | 1–0 | 0–1 | 0–2 | 3–0 | 0–3 | 2–1 | 2–1 | 0–1 | 2–0 | 2–1 | 2–0 | 0–0 | 2–3 | 0–4 |
| Burton Albion | 1–3 | 2–1 | | 2–1 | 2–1 | 0–2 | 1–0 | 1–0 | 0–1 | 3–0 | 1–0 | 1–1 | 2–1 | 2–0 | 1–2 | 1–2 | 0–1 | 0–0 | 1–0 | 2–1 | 1–0 | 1–1 | 2–1 | 1–2 |
| Cambridge United | 2–0 | 2–2 | 1–2 | | 1–2 | 4–2 | 1–3 | 1–1 | 3–0 | 2–0 | 1–2 | 1–1 | 1–3 | 0–1 | 0–3 | 0–1 | 2–2 | 0–1 | 0–2 | 1–0 | 1–0 | 7–0 | 3–0 | 0–5 |
| Crawley Town | 1–2 | 1–1 | 1–0 | 1–1 | | 0–0 | 0–3 | 3–1 | 1–1 | 0–1 | 2–0 | 0–0 | 4–0 | 0–2 | 0–1 | 1–0 | 2–1 | 1–2 | 2–1 | 3–0 | 1–0 | 0–3 | 0–0 | 3–0 |
| Dagenham & Redbridge | 2–1 | 4–1 | 3–0 | 2–0 | 2–1 | | 4–1 | 1–1 | 2–1 | 0–0 | 1–0 | 1–3 | 2–1 | 5–0 | 0–1 | 1–2 | 0–0 | 1–1 | 4–2 | 2–0 | 4–0 | 4–1 | 3–2 | 2–1 |
| Exeter City | 0–0 | 2–1 | 3–0 | 2–0 | 1–1 | 3–2 | | 1–0 | 1–3 | 2–1 | 4–1 | 1–1 | 1–0 | 1–1 | 2–1 | 0–0 | 2–1 | 1–2 | 4–2 | 1–1 | 1–0 | 4–0 | 1–0 | 1–1 |
| Forest Green Rovers | 3–0 | 2–2 | 1–0 | 1–1 | 1–0 | 0–1 | 2–1 | | 0–1 | 0–0 | 2–0 | 2–1 | 1–3 | 2–1 | 1–5 | 0–2 | 1–2 | 2–1 | 2–2 | 4–4 | 2–0 | 3–2 | 2–3 | 0–1 |
| Gravesend & Northfleet | 1–1 | 3–1 | 0–0 | 2–0 | 1–0 | 0–0 | 2–2 | 1–1 | | 2–0 | 2–0 | 1–3 | 2–1 | 3–0 | 1–0 | 1–0 | 0–4 | 1–4 | 3–2 | 1–1 | 4–1 | 1–3 | 1–0 | 0–1 |
| Grays Athletic | 1–2 | 1–1 | 0–1 | 1–1 | 0–0 | 0–1 | 2–2 | 1–1 | 0–2 | | 1–0 | 3–0 | 0–1 | 1–0 | 2–2 | 3–1 | 4–0 | 1–1 | 2–1 | 0–2 | 1–0 | 2–2 | 3–0 | 0–0 |
| Halifax Town | 2–0 | 1–1 | 1–2 | 1–0 | 2–1 | 3–1 | 2–1 | 2–2 | 1–1 | 0–2 | | 2–0 | 1–1 | 0–2 | 1–1 | 0–0 | 1–1 | 3–1 | 4–1 | 2–1 | 3–1 | 4–1 | 3–0 | 1–1 |
| Kidderminster Harriers | 0–0 | 3–2 | 0–0 | 1–0 | 0–1 | 1–4 | 0–2 | 2–2 | 1–2 | 2–1 | 1–0 | | 0–1 | 0–1 | 0–0 | 0–0 | 2–0 | 2–0 | 1–3 | 1–2 | 0–2 | 0–1 | 0–1 | 2–1 |
| Morecambe | 2–1 | 0–1 | 0–1 | 2–2 | 1–0 | 1–1 | 2–2 | 1–1 | 1–0 | 1–0 | 4–0 | 0–1 | | 2–1 | 0–3 | 1–0 | 0–0 | 1–0 | 2–0 | 3–3 | 0–0 | 2–0 | 2–0 | 1–3 |
| Northwich Victoria | 1–3 | 1–1 | 0–3 | 0–4 | 2–1 | 2–0 | 1–0 | 2–0 | 1–2 | 0–3 | 3–2 | 0–1 | 0–2 | | 1–0 | 4–1 | 3–1 | 4–0 | 0–3 | 0–0 | 0–1 | 0–1 | 0–2 | 1–2 |
| Oxford United | 2–0 | 1–1 | 0–0 | 1–1 | 1–1 | 2–2 | 1–0 | 0–2 | 1–0 | 1–1 | 2–0 | 0–1 | 0–0 | 5–1 | | 0–1 | 2–2 | 2–0 | 2–1 | 2–0 | 2–1 | 4–1 | 0–0 | 2–0 |
| Rushden & Diamonds | 1–0 | 3–0 | 1–2 | 3–1 | 1–1 | 2–3 | 3–0 | 2–0 | 0–0 | 1–3 | 0–1 | 0–1 | 2–2 | 1–0 | 1–0 | | 2–3 | 2–1 | 1–0 | 2–2 | 1–1 | 4–1 | 2–0 | 0–1 |
| Southport | 1–0 | 2–1 | 3–1 | 1–2 | 3–1 | 1–4 | 0–1 | 1–2 | 2–2 | 3–1 | 1–1 | 0–1 | 1–2 | 1–2 | 0–1 | 1–2 | | 5–1 | 1–1 | 1–2 | 1–0 | 0–1 | 0–0 | 0–1 |
| Stafford Rangers | 0–3 | 1–0 | 1–1 | 1–2 | 0–1 | 1–2 | 0–1 | 0–1 | 3–1 | 4–2 | 2–3 | 1–2 | 1–3 | 2–0 | 0–1 | 1–1 | 1–0 | | 2–2 | 1–3 | 0–4 | 2–0 | 1–0 | 0–0 |
| St Albans City | 3–5 | 1–5 | 0–1 | 0–0 | 2–2 | 1–2 | 1–2 | 0–0 | 2–3 | 0–6 | 3–2 | 1–1 | 0–2 | 1–3 | 0–2 | 3–2 | 2–2 | 0–3 | | 2–3 | 1–0 | 1–0 | 0–1 | 4–2 |
| Stevenage Borough | 3–2 | 0–1 | 2–1 | 4–1 | 2–3 | 1–2 | 0–0 | 3–3 | 3–0 | 1–0 | 2–1 | 1–2 | 3–3 | 0–2 | 2–2 | 1–0 | 3–1 | 6–0 | 1–2 | | 3–0 | 1–0 | 3–2 | 1–2 |
| Tamworth | 2–0 | 1–0 | 0–1 | 0–1 | 0–1 | 0–2 | 1–0 | 1–1 | 2–1 | 4–2 | 1–0 | 0–0 | 0–1 | 0–1 | 1–3 | 1–4 | 1–1 | 0–0 | 1–1 | 2–1 | | 1–3 | 3–1 | 2–2 |
| Weymouth | 1–0 | 1–2 | 1–1 | 2–1 | 3–2 | 1–1 | 2–1 | 1–0 | 2–1 | 3–2 | 1–0 | 1–1 | 2–1 | 1–1 | 1–1 | 1–1 | 2–0 | 1–2 | 2–1 | 0–1 | 3–1 | | 2–3 | 1–2 |
| Woking | 2–0 | 2–0 | 0–0 | 0–1 | 1–2 | 2–2 | 0–2 | 3–3 | 2–2 | 1–0 | 2–2 | 3–0 | 1–1 | 3–2 | 1–0 | 3–0 | 1–1 | 1–1 | 1–2 | 0–1 | 0–2 | 4–0 | | 1–2 |
| York City | 1–0 | 1–0 | 3–2 | 1–2 | 5–0 | 2–3 | 0–0 | 0–0 | 0–2 | 2–2 | 2–0 | 1–0 | 2–3 | 2–1 | 1–0 | 3–1 | 2–2 | 0–0 | 0–0 | 0–1 | 0–2 | 1–0 | 0–1 | |

Updated to match(es) played on unknown. Source: Soccerbase
Legend: Blue = home team win; Yellow = draw; Red = away team win.

=== Play-offs ===
Semifinals; 1st leg – 4 May 2007; 2nd leg – 7/8 May 2007
2nd | Oxford United | 1 | 1 | 2 (3)
5th | Exeter City (a.e.t.), pen.) | 0 | 2 | 2 (4)
3rd | Morecambe | 0 | 2 | 2
4th | York City | 0 | 1 | 1

Final at Wembley Stadium; 20 May 2007
3rd | Morecambe | 2
5th | Exeter City | 1

==== Semifinals ====
4 May 2007
1st Leg

| Exeter City | 0–1 | Oxford United |
|---|---|---|
| | Report | Taylor 40' (o.g.) |

St. James Park, Exeter
Attendance: 8,659
8 May 2007
19:45
2nd Leg

| Oxford United | 1–2 | Exeter City |
|---|---|---|
| Odubade 27' | Report 1 | Phillips 39'; Stansfield 70' |
Penalties
| Duffy (penalty scored); Burgess (penalty scored); Johnson (penalty scored); Quinn (penalty missed); Turley (penalty missed); Zebroski (penalty missed) | 3–4 | (penalty missed) Jones; (penalty scored) Gill; (penalty scored) Taylor; (penalty scored) Mackie; (penalty missed) Logan; (penalty scored) Tully |

Kassam Stadium, Oxford
Attendance: 10,691

Exeter City won 4–3 on Penalties after tying 2–2 on Aggregate.

4 May 2007
1st Leg

| York City | 0–0 | Morecambe |
|---|---|---|
| | Report |

Bootham Crescent, York
Attendance: 6,660
Referee: G Lewis
7 May 2007
2nd Leg

| Morecambe | 2–1 | York City |
|---|---|---|
| Curtis 40', 48' | Report | Bowey 20' (pen.) |

Christie Park, Morecambe
Attendance: 5,567
Referee: R East

Morecambe won 2–1 on Aggregate.

==== Play-Off Final ====
20 May 2007
14:00

| Exeter City | 1–2 | Morecambe |
|---|---|---|
| Phillips 8' | Report | Thompson 42'; Carlton 82' |

Wembley Stadium, London
Attendance: 40,043
Referee: Michael Oliver

=== Top scorers in order of league goals ===
| Pos | Player | Club | League | Play- offs | FA Cup | FA Trophy | Total |
|---|---|---|---|---|---|---|---|
| 1 | (England) Paul Benson | Dagenham & Redbridge | 28 | 0 | 0 | 2 | 30 |
| 2 | (England) Charlie MacDonald | Gravesend & Northfleet | 27 | 0 | 0 | 2 | 29 |
| 3 | (Wales) Steve Morison | Stevenage Borough | 24 | 0 | 2 | 8 | 34 |
| = | (Jamaica) Clayton Donaldson | York City | 24 | 0 | 1 | 1 | 26 |
| 5 | (Canada) Simeon Jackson | Rushden & Diamonds | 19 | 0 | 1 | 0 | 20 |
| 6 | (Wales) Robert Duffy | Oxford United | 18 | 0 | 1 | 2 | 21 |
| 7 | (England) Robbie Simpson | Cambridge United | 17 | 0 | 0 | 0 | 17 |
| 8 | (Republic of Ireland) Daryl Clare | Burton Albion | 16 | 0 | 2 | 0 | 18 |
| 9 | (Scotland) Craig McAllister | Woking | 15 | 0 | 1 | 1 | 17 |
| 10 | (England) Neil Grayson | Stafford Rangers | 13 | 0 | 0 | 0 | 13 |

== Conference North ==
Conference North
- Season: 2006–07
- Champions: Droylsden (1st Football Conference North title)
- Direct promotion: Droylsden
- Promoted through play-offs: Farsley Celtic
- Relegated to Level 7 or folded: Lancaster City, Worksop Town; Scarborough (folded)
- Promoted for the next season: Boston United, AFC Telford United
- Matches: 462
- Goals: 1,281 (2.77 per match)
- Biggest home win: Droylsden – Lancaster City 6–1 (17 February 2007); Droylsden – Stalybridge Celtic 6–1 (18 September 2006); Hinckley – Lancaster 5–0 (23 April 2007); Hucknall – Lancaster 5–0 (20 January 2007); Hyde – Lancaster 5–0 (22 January 2007)
- Biggest away win: Stalybridge Celtic – Hyde United 3–7 (1 January 2007); Lancaster City – Scarborough 1–5 (22 January 2007); Lancaster City – Workington 1–5 (7 October 2006); Vauxhall Motors – Harrogate 1–5 (27 January 2007); Barrow – Redditch United 0–4 (9 September 2006); Lancaster City – Nuneaton 0–4 (6 January 2007); Stalybridge Celtic – Barrow 0–4 (27 January 2007)
- Highest scoring: Stalybridge Celtic – Hyde United 3–7 (1 January 2007)
- Longest winning run: ?
- Longest unbeaten run: ?
- Longest losing run: ?
- Highest attendance: ?
- Lowest attendance: ?
- Average attendance: ?

A total of 22 teams contested the division, including 19 sides from last season, one relegated from the Conference National and two promoted from the Northern Premier League.

=== Promotion and relegation ===
Teams promoted from 2005–06 Northern Premier League

- Blyth Spartans
- Farsley Celtic

Teams relegated from 2005–06 Conference National

- Scarborough

=== League table ===
| Pos | Team | Pld | W | D | L | GF | GA | GD | Pts | Promotion or relegation |
|---|---|---|---|---|---|---|---|---|---|---|
| 1 | Droylsden (C, P) | 42 | 23 | 9 | 10 | 85 | 55 | +30 | 78 | Promotion to Conference Premier |
| 2 | Kettering Town | 42 | 20 | 13 | 9 | 75 | 58 | +17 | 73 | Qualification for the Conference North play-offs |
| 3 | Workington | 42 | 20 | 10 | 12 | 61 | 46 | +15 | 70 | Qualification for the Conference North play-offs |
| 4 | Hinckley United | 42 | 19 | 12 | 11 | 68 | 54 | +14 | 69 | Qualification for the Conference North play-offs |
| 5 | Farsley Celtic (O, P) | 42 | 19 | 11 | 12 | 58 | 51 | +7 | 68 | Qualification for the Conference North play-offs |
| 6 | Harrogate Town | 42 | 18 | 13 | 11 | 58 | 41 | +17 | 67 | |
| 7 | Blyth Spartans | 42 | 19 | 9 | 14 | 56 | 50 | +6 | 66 | |
| 8 | Hyde United | 42 | 18 | 11 | 13 | 79 | 62 | +17 | 65 | |
| 9 | Worcester City | 42 | 16 | 14 | 12 | 67 | 54 | +13 | 62 | |
| 10 | Nuneaton Borough | 42 | 15 | 15 | 12 | 54 | 45 | +9 | 60 | |
| 11 | Moor Green | 42 | 16 | 11 | 15 | 53 | 51 | +2 | 59 | Merged into Solihull Moors (Note: At the end of the season, Moor Green merged with Solihull Borough of the Level 8 Southern League Division One Midlands to form Solihull Moors, with the new club taking Moor Green's place in the Conference North.) |
| 12 | Gainsborough Trinity | 42 | 15 | 11 | 16 | 51 | 57 | −6 | 56 | |
| 13 | Hucknall Town | 42 | 15 | 9 | 18 | 69 | 69 | 0 | 54 | |
| 14 | Alfreton Town | 42 | 14 | 12 | 16 | 44 | 50 | −6 | 54 | |
| 15 | Vauxhall Motors | 42 | 12 | 15 | 15 | 62 | 64 | −2 | 51 | |
| 16 | Barrow | 42 | 12 | 14 | 16 | 47 | 48 | −1 | 50 | |
| 17 | Leigh RMI | 42 | 13 | 10 | 19 | 47 | 61 | −14 | 49 | |
| 18 | Stalybridge Celtic | 42 | 13 | 10 | 19 | 64 | 81 | −17 | 49 | |
| 19 | Redditch United | 42 | 11 | 15 | 16 | 62 | 67 | −5 | 48 | |
| 20 | Scarborough | 42 | 13 | 16 | 13 | 50 | 45 | +5 | 45 (Note: Scarborough were deducted 10 points for entering administration.) | Club folded |
| 21 | Worksop Town (R) | 42 | 12 | 9 | 21 | 44 | 62 | −18 | 45 | Relegation to the Northern Premier League Premier Division |
| 22 | Lancaster City (R) | 42 | 2 | 5 | 35 | 27 | 110 | −83 | 1 (Note: Lancaster City were deducted 10 points for entering administration.) | Relegation to the Northern Premier League Division One North (Note: Lancaster City were relegated two divisions to the Northern Premier League Division One North due to financial problems.) |

(C) Champions; (O) Play-off winners; (P) Promoted; (R) Relegated

=== Locations ===
Locations of the Football Conference North 2006–2007 teams

=== Results ===
| Home \ Away | ALF | BRW | BLY | DRO | FAR | GAI | HAR | HIN | HUC | HYD | KET | LNC | LEI | MOG | NUN | RED | SCA | STL | VAU | WRC | WRK | WKS |
|---|---|---|---|---|---|---|---|---|---|---|---|---|---|---|---|---|---|---|---|---|---|---|
| Alfreton Town | | 1–0 | 0–1 | 1–3 | 0–1 | 3–1 | 0–0 | 0–1 | 2–1 | 2–2 | 1–1 | 2–1 | 1–0 | 3–0 | 0–3 | 0–0 | 1–1 | 1–2 | 2–0 | 0–2 | 1–1 | 3–0 |
| Barrow | 1–1 | | 0–2 | 2–1 | 2–2 | 3–0 | 2–3 | 1–0 | 1–0 | 1–2 | 0–1 | 3–0 | 2–0 | 1–1 | 0–1 | 0–4 | 1–1 | 2–1 | 0–0 | 0–1 | 0–0 | 1–2 |
| Blyth Spartans | 3–0 | 1–0 | | 0–3 | 4–1 | 2–0 | 0–0 | 3–1 | 2–2 | 0–0 | 2–2 | 3–0 | 1–0 | 0–1 | 1–2 | 1–2 | 2–0 | 1–0 | 1–2 | 2–2 | 0–2 | 2–0 |
| Droylsden | 1–1 | 2–1 | 0–0 | | 4–1 | 2–1 | 2–0 | 3–1 | 5–3 | 4–2 | 1–1 | 6–1 | 2–2 | 1–0 | 4–2 | 2–1 | 1–3 | 6–1 | 1–0 | 2–1 | 2–1 | 3–2 |
| Farsley Celtic | 1–1 | 2–2 | 3–0 | 0–3 | | 1–0 | 1–0 | 0–2 | 1–0 | 1–1 | 2–1 | 3–1 | 1–1 | 0–1 | 0–1 | 4–0 | 0–2 | 1–1 | 3–2 | 1–0 | 1–2 | 1–0 |
| Gainsborough Trinity | 4–0 | 1–0 | 0–2 | 3–2 | 0–0 | | 1–3 | 1–0 | 2–3 | 2–3 | 2–3 | 1–0 | 0–0 | 1–0 | 1–1 | 2–2 | 3–1 | 2–0 | 1–2 | 1–3 | 1–0 | 1–1 |
| Harrogate Town | 0–1 | 1–1 | 1–2 | 1–1 | 1–0 | 1–1 | | 2–0 | 1–1 | 1–2 | 2–3 | 3–0 | 2–1 | 1–1 | 1–1 | 2–2 | 0–1 | 0–0 | 1–0 | 1–0 | 4–0 | 1–0 |
| Hinckley United | 2–2 | 1–1 | 2–1 | 2–1 | 2–1 | 1–1 | 0–1 | | 1–1 | 2–0 | 3–1 | 5–0 | 3–1 | 2–0 | 2–2 | 3–1 | 1–1 | 2–3 | 1–1 | 3–3 | 2–1 | 0–1 |
| Hucknall Town | 0–2 | 1–3 | 1–2 | 2–2 | 0–1 | 3–3 | 0–3 | 1–2 | | 4–2 | 1–2 | 5–0 | 1–3 | 3–2 | 2–1 | 2–2 | 0–1 | 2–1 | 2–2 | 4–2 | 2–1 | 4–0 |
| Hyde United | 2–1 | 1–1 | 5–1 | 2–1 | 3–4 | 3–0 | 4–0 | 2–0 | 1–0 | | 3–5 | 5–0 | 2–0 | 4–1 | 3–2 | 0–2 | 1–1 | 3–1 | 1–1 | 0–0 | 1–1 | 1–2 |
| Kettering Town | 0–1 | 3–2 | 1–1 | 1–0 | 3–2 | 4–2 | 3–1 | 1–2 | 0–0 | 1–0 | | 3–3 | 4–0 | 1–1 | 3–2 | 3–1 | 3–1 | 2–1 | 0–1 | 1–1 | 2–3 | 2–2 |
| Lancaster City | 0–2 | 0–2 | 0–2 | 1–2 | 1–2 | 0–1 | 0–2 | 1–4 | 0–1 | 2–3 | 0–1 | | 0–0 | 0–3 | 0–4 | 1–2 | 1–5 | 0–1 | 2–2 | 0–2 | 1–5 | 0–3 |
| Leigh RMI | 2–0 | 0–3 | 3–1 | 2–2 | 1–3 | 2–0 | 1–3 | 2–3 | 4–3 | 2–0 | 1–2 | 0–1 | | 2–2 | 1–0 | 0–0 | 1–1 | 1–3 | 0–3 | 2–1 | 2–0 | 2–1 |
| Moor Green | 2–0 | 0–0 | 0–2 | 5–2 | 1–1 | 2–1 | 0–1 | 0–1 | 1–2 | 1–1 | 1–2 | 3–1 | 0–0 | | 1–1 | 1–1 | 1–2 | 2–1 | 5–2 | 3–1 | 1–0 | 0–1 |
| Nuneaton Borough | 1–0 | 3–0 | 1–1 | 1–0 | 1–1 | 0–1 | 0–0 | 0–1 | 2–1 | 0–0 | 2–1 | 1–0 | 0–1 | 0–1 | | 1–0 | 1–1 | 3–2 | 1–1 | 1–1 | 0–0 | 0–0 |
| Redditch United | 3–2 | 1–1 | 0–2 | 0–0 | 1–4 | 1–1 | 2–1 | 1–3 | 1–2 | 2–1 | 4–4 | 2–2 | 2–1 | 0–1 | 2–0 | | 1–1 | 1–2 | 3–3 | 1–2 | 4–1 | 0–1 |
| Scarborough | 0–1 | 1–1 | 0–1 | 1–0 | 0–0 | 0–0 | 1–1 | 3–0 | 1–2 | 1–2 | 1–1 | 1–2 | 1–1 | 3–0 | 1–3 | 3–2 | | 0–1 | 0–1 | 1–0 | 0–1 | 2–1 |
| Stalybridge Celtic | 3–2 | 0–4 | 3–2 | 1–2 | 0–2 | 0–2 | 0–2 | 2–2 | 2–2 | 3–7 | 0–0 | 3–1 | 2–1 | 2–3 | 4–3 | 3–2 | 2–2 | | 3–3 | 1–1 | 1–2 | 3–0 |
| Vauxhall Motors | 1–2 | 0–1 | 2–0 | 2–3 | 1–2 | 0–1 | 1–5 | 2–2 | 1–2 | 1–0 | 1–1 | 4–1 | 2–1 | 1–1 | 1–3 | 1–1 | 1–1 | 2–2 | | 2–0 | 1–2 | 2–0 |
| Worcester City | 0–0 | 3–0 | 3–2 | 3–1 | 0–1 | 1–1 | 2–3 | 3–1 | 2–0 | 2–2 | 2–0 | 4–1 | 1–2 | 0–1 | 3–3 | 1–1 | 3–2 | 1–1 | 3–3 | | 2–2 | 2–1 |
| Workington | 1–1 | 1–1 | 3–0 | 0–0 | 3–0 | 1–2 | 3–2 | 1–1 | 1–0 | 3–1 | 2–0 | 1–1 | 0–1 | 3–2 | 2–0 | 1–0 | 0–1 | 2–1 | 2–0 | 0–1 | | 3–2 |
| Worksop Town | 2–0 | 2–0 | 1–1 | 0–2 | 2–2 | 1–2 | 0–0 | 1–1 | 1–3 | 3–1 | 0–2 | 3–1 | 2–0 | 0–1 | 0–0 | 2–3 | 0–0 | 2–1 | 1–4 | 0–2 | 1–3 | |

Updated to match(es) played on unknown. Source: Sky Sports Football Yearbook 2007–2008. Glenda Rollin & Jack Rollin (eds.). Headline, 2007.
Legend: Blue = home team win; Yellow = draw; Red = away team win.

=== Play-offs ===
Semifinals
2nd | Kettering Town | 1 | 0 | 1 (2)
5th | Farsley Celtic (a.e.t.), pen.) | 1 | 0 | 1 (4)
3rd | Workington | 0 | 1 | 1
4th | Hinckley United | 0 | 2 | 2

Final
5th | Farsley Celtic | 4
4th | Hinckley United | 3

==== Semifinals ====
2 May 2007
19:45 GMT
1st Leg

| Farsley Celtic | 1–1 | Kettering Town |
|---|---|---|
| Reeves 17' | Report | Solkhon 75' |

The Citadel, Farsley
Attendance: 1,621
5 May 2007
15:00 GMT
2nd Leg

| Kettering Town | 0–0 (a.e.t.) | Farsley Celtic |
|---|---|---|
| | Report |
Penalties
| Penalty scored Penalty missed | 2–4 | Penalty scored |

Rockingham Road, Kettering
Attendance: 2,033

Farsley Celtic won 4–2 in penalties after tying 1–1 on Aggregate.

2 May 2007
19:45 GMT
1st Leg

| Hinckley United | 0–0 | Workington |
|---|---|---|
| | Report |

De Montfort Park, Hinckley
Attendance: 1,092
5 May 2007
15:00 GMT
2nd Leg

| Workington | 1–2 | Hinckley United |
|---|---|---|
| Hewson 87' | Report | Jackson 43'; Marrison 47' |

Borough Park, Workington
Attendance: 1,519

Hinkley United won 2–1 on Aggregate.

==== Play-Off Final ====
14 May 2007
19:45 GMT

| Hinckley United | 3–4 | Farsley Celtic |
|---|---|---|
| Shilton 19'; Cartwright 21', 83' | Report | Grant 15'; Reeves 79', 89' (pen.); Crossley 87' |

Pirelli Stadium, Burton
Attendance: 2,495

== Conference South ==
Conference South
- Season: 2006–07
- Champions: Histon (1st Football Conference South title)
- Direct promotion: Histon
- Promoted through play-offs: Salisbury City
- Relegated to Level 7: Bedford, Farnborough Town (folded)
- Promoted for the next season: Bath City, Bromley, Hampton & Richmond Borough, Maidenhead United
- Matches: 462
- Goals: 1,311 (2.84 per match)
- Biggest home win: Havant & Waterlooville – Hayes 6–0 (3 March 2007)
- Biggest away win: Weston-super-Mare – Hayes 0–5 (7 February 2007)
- Highest scoring: Dorchester – Sutton 5–4 (18 November 2006); Havant & Waterlooville – Bishop's Stortford 5–4 (22 January 2007)
- Longest winning run: ?
- Longest unbeaten run: ?
- Longest losing run: ?
- Highest attendance: ?
- Lowest attendance: ?
- Average attendance: ?

A total of 22 teams contested the division, including 18 sides from last season, two promoted from the Isthmian League and two promoted from the Southern Football League.

=== Promotion and relegation ===
Teams promoted from 2005–06 Southern Football League

- Salisbury City
- Bedford Town

Teams promoted from 2005–06 Isthmian League

- Braintree Town
- Fisher Athletic

=== League table ===
| Pos | Team | Pld | W | D | L | GF | GA | GD | Pts | Promotion or relegation |
|---|---|---|---|---|---|---|---|---|---|---|
| 1 | Histon (C, P) | 42 | 30 | 4 | 8 | 85 | 44 | +41 | 94 | Promotion to Conference Premier |
| 2 | Salisbury City (O, P) | 42 | 21 | 12 | 9 | 65 | 37 | +28 | 75 | Qualification for the Conference South play-offs |
| 3 | Braintree Town | 42 | 21 | 11 | 10 | 51 | 38 | +13 | 74 | Qualification for the Conference South play-offs |
| 4 | Havant & Waterlooville | 42 | 20 | 13 | 9 | 75 | 46 | +29 | 73 | Qualification for the Conference South play-offs |
| 5 | Bishop's Stortford | 42 | 21 | 10 | 11 | 72 | 61 | +11 | 73 | Qualification for the Conference South play-offs |
| 6 | Newport County | 42 | 21 | 7 | 14 | 83 | 57 | +26 | 70 | |
| 7 | Eastbourne Borough | 42 | 18 | 15 | 9 | 58 | 42 | +16 | 69 | |
| 8 | Welling United | 42 | 21 | 6 | 15 | 65 | 51 | +14 | 69 | |
| 9 | Lewes | 42 | 15 | 17 | 10 | 67 | 52 | +15 | 62 | |
| 10 | Fisher Athletic | 42 | 15 | 11 | 16 | 78 | 80 | −2 | 56 | |
| 11 | Farnborough Town | 42 | 19 | 8 | 15 | 59 | 52 | +7 | 55 (Note: Farnborough Town were deducted 10 points for entering administration.) | Expelled and folded (Note: Farnborough Town folded before the following season. They were reformed as Farnborough F.C. in the Southern Football League Division One South & West, two divisions below the Conference South.) |
| 12 | Bognor Regis Town | 42 | 13 | 13 | 16 | 56 | 62 | −6 | 52 | |
| 13 | Cambridge City | 42 | 15 | 7 | 20 | 44 | 52 | −8 | 52 | |
| 14 | Sutton United | 42 | 14 | 9 | 19 | 58 | 63 | −5 | 51 | |
| 15 | Eastleigh | 42 | 11 | 15 | 16 | 48 | 53 | −5 | 48 | |
| 16 | Yeading | 42 | 12 | 9 | 21 | 56 | 78 | −22 | 45 | Merged into Hayes & Yeading United (Note: At the end of the season, Yeading and Hayes merged together, forming Hayes & Yeading United.) |
| 17 | Dorchester Town | 42 | 11 | 12 | 19 | 49 | 77 | −28 | 45 | |
| 18 | Thurrock | 42 | 11 | 11 | 20 | 61 | 80 | −19 | 44 | |
| 19 | Basingstoke Town | 42 | 9 | 16 | 17 | 46 | 58 | −12 | 43 | |
| 20 | Hayes | 42 | 11 | 10 | 21 | 47 | 73 | −26 | 43 | Merged into Hayes & Yeading United |
| 21 | Weston-super-Mare | 42 | 8 | 11 | 23 | 49 | 77 | −28 | 35 | Reprieved from relegation (Note: Weston-super-Mare were reprieved from relegation due to Farnborough Town folding and the merger of Hayes and Yeading.) |
| 22 | Bedford Town (R) | 42 | 8 | 7 | 27 | 43 | 82 | −39 | 31 | Relegation to the Southern League Premier Division |

(C) Champions; (O) Play-off winners; (P) Promoted; (R) Relegated

=== Locations ===
Locations of the Football Conference South teams 2006–2007
Locations of the Football Conference South London teams 2006–2007

=== Results ===
| Home \ Away | BAS | BED | BST | BOG | BRA | CAM | DOR | EAB | EAS | FAR | FIS | H&W | HAY | HIS | LEW | NPC | SAL | SUT | THU | WEL | WSM | YEA |
|---|---|---|---|---|---|---|---|---|---|---|---|---|---|---|---|---|---|---|---|---|---|---|
| Basingstoke Town | | 0–1 | 1–0 | 4–0 | 1–2 | 0–0 | 2–2 | 0–1 | 0–1 | 0–2 | 2–1 | 2–1 | 1–1 | 1–2 | 0–0 | 0–1 | 1–1 | 0–2 | 1–1 | 1–3 | 0–1 | 1–3 |
| Bedford Town | 0–0 | | 3–1 | 2–3 | 1–2 | 0–1 | 1–1 | 1–1 | 1–1 | 0–2 | 1–4 | 2–1 | 1–2 | 0–2 | 0–2 | 0–2 | 1–2 | 2–0 | 3–1 | 2–2 | 2–1 | 2–5 |
| Bishop's Stortford | 3–1 | 2–2 | | 0–1 | 0–2 | 2–1 | 4–3 | 1–0 | 1–1 | 2–1 | 2–2 | 1–0 | 3–1 | 0–0 | 3–0 | 2–2 | 1–1 | 3–2 | 2–1 | 1–3 | 2–2 | 2–0 |
| Bognor Regis Town | 1–2 | 1–0 | 2–4 | | 1–2 | 0–1 | 3–0 | 1–1 | 0–0 | 1–1 | 1–1 | 0–0 | 5–1 | 0–0 | 1–1 | 1–1 | 1–1 | 0–4 | 3–0 | 1–1 | 3–1 | 3–1 |
| Braintree Town | 1–0 | 2–0 | 3–1 | 1–2 | | 2–1 | 3–1 | 1–1 | 1–1 | 2–1 | 2–2 | 0–0 | 0–1 | 1–1 | 1–1 | 2–1 | 0–0 | 0–1 | 0–1 | 2–1 | 0–1 | 3–1 |
| Cambridge City | 0–1 | 0–0 | 0–1 | 2–0 | 1–0 | | 0–1 | 1–0 | 2–0 | 1–1 | 0–0 | 3–0 | 2–2 | 0–1 | 1–0 | 2–1 | 1–3 | 2–3 | 2–3 | 0–1 | 2–3 | 3–0 |
| Dorchester Town | 1–2 | 1–3 | 0–1 | 0–1 | 0–0 | 3–1 | | 0–0 | 1–0 | 4–1 | 1–3 | 1–3 | 0–2 | 1–2 | 1–5 | 0–4 | 0–3 | 5–4 | 3–1 | 0–1 | 1–5 | 3–2 |
| Eastbourne Borough | 1–1 | 0–3 | 2–1 | 2–0 | 1–2 | 2–1 | 1–1 | | 0–0 | 0–0 | 3–1 | 1–1 | 0–0 | 1–1 | 2–1 | 2–1 | 1–0 | 2–0 | 3–1 | 0–0 | 3–0 | 2–0 |
| Eastleigh | 3–1 | 2–0 | 1–1 | 0–4 | 0–3 | 0–1 | 1–1 | 1–1 | | 3–1 | 4–0 | 0–1 | 2–1 | 1–0 | 0–0 | 3–1 | 0–1 | 1–0 | 1–1 | 1–3 | 1–1 | 1–4 |
| Farnborough Town | 1–1 | 3–2 | 3–1 | 3–1 | 2–1 | 2–1 | 1–1 | 1–0 | 1–0 | | 2–0 | 2–1 | 1–3 | 2–3 | 1–1 | 1–0 | 0–1 | 4–0 | 2–1 | 2–1 | 0–0 | 2–1 |
| Fisher Athletic | 3–3 | 3–0 | 0–1 | 3–0 | 3–0 | 3–0 | 1–1 | 0–3 | 3–1 | 3–0 | | 3–3 | 3–0 | 1–4 | 5–1 | 3–3 | 1–4 | 2–1 | 3–5 | 2–1 | 1–1 | 3–1 |
| Havant & Waterlooville | 1–0 | 4–0 | 5–4 | 2–2 | 1–1 | 2–3 | 2–0 | 2–1 | 1–1 | 2–0 | 1–3 | | 6–0 | 2–1 | 1–1 | 3–1 | 3–1 | 1–0 | 3–0 | 4–0 | 2–1 | 4–0 |
| Hayes | 1–1 | 3–1 | 1–2 | 2–3 | 2–3 | 0–1 | 4–0 | 1–1 | 2–1 | 1–1 | 4–3 | 0–1 | | 1–3 | 1–4 | 0–1 | 0–4 | 0–4 | 1–1 | 0–1 | 1–0 | 0–1 |
| Histon | 4–2 | 1–0 | 0–2 | 2–1 | 2–0 | 2–1 | 3–0 | 1–2 | 1–0 | 2–1 | 2–1 | 4–0 | 5–0 | | 3–2 | 1–0 | 4–2 | 2–1 | 3–1 | 1–0 | 3–2 | 1–2 |
| Lewes | 2–2 | 5–1 | 2–3 | 1–1 | 0–1 | 1–1 | 2–2 | 1–1 | 0–3 | 1–0 | 2–0 | 1–1 | 2–0 | 3–1 | | 2–0 | 1–0 | 3–1 | 1–1 | 4–2 | 4–2 | 3–2 |
| Newport County | 3–0 | 2–0 | 4–1 | 3–1 | 0–1 | 1–2 | 0–1 | 4–0 | 3–1 | 3–4 | 4–2 | 1–0 | 2–0 | 5–1 | 1–1 | | 4–3 | 3–1 | 1–3 | 3–1 | 1–0 | 4–1 |
| Salisbury City | 0–0 | 3–1 | 3–1 | 2–1 | 0–1 | 2–0 | 1–1 | 1–2 | 1–0 | 0–1 | 3–0 | 1–1 | 0–0 | 0–3 | 1–1 | 2–1 | | 1–0 | 0–0 | 1–0 | 0–0 | 4–0 |
| Sutton United | 3–3 | 3–1 | 1–1 | 3–2 | 0–0 | 2–2 | 0–0 | 3–1 | 2–2 | 1–0 | 2–2 | 0–1 | 1–0 | 1–0 | 0–2 | 1–1 | 0–1 | | 2–1 | 1–2 | 3–1 | 1–3 |
| Thurrock | 2–2 | 2–1 | 0–3 | 1–1 | 0–1 | 1–0 | 2–3 | 2–4 | 1–1 | 1–4 | 5–1 | 1–1 | 0–1 | 0–4 | 3–2 | 2–2 | 1–5 | 3–0 | | 1–2 | 2–2 | 1–0 |
| Welling United | 0–2 | 5–0 | 2–3 | 3–0 | 4–1 | 1–0 | 1–2 | 1–0 | 2–1 | 1–0 | 2–0 | 1–1 | 1–1 | 2–4 | 0–0 | 2–3 | 1–2 | 1–0 | 1–2 | | 1–0 | 5–1 |
| Weston-super-Mare | 1–3 | 2–1 | 1–2 | 1–3 | 0–0 | 0–1 | 1–2 | 2–4 | 3–3 | 2–1 | 0–1 | 1–5 | 0–5 | 1–2 | 1–1 | 3–4 | 1–1 | 0–2 | 2–1 | 1–2 | | 2–1 |
| Yeading | 1–1 | 2–1 | 1–1 | 2–0 | 0–1 | 5–0 | 0–0 | 2–5 | 1–4 | 2–1 | 1–1 | 1–1 | 1–1 | 1–3 | 1–0 | 1–1 | 1–3 | 2–2 | 2–1 | 0–1 | 0–0 | |

Updated to match(es) played on unknown. Source: Sky Sports Football Yearbook 2007–2008. Glenda Rollin & Jack Rollin (eds.). Headline, 2007.
Legend: Blue = home team win; Yellow = draw; Red = away team win.

=== Play-offs ===
Semifinals
2nd | Salisbury City (a.e.t.) | 1 | 3 | 4
5th | Bishop's Stortford | 1 | 1 | 2
3rd | Braintree Town (pen.) | 1 | 1 | 2 (4)
4th | Havant & Waterlooville | 1 | 1 | 2 (2)

Final
2nd | Salisbury City | 1
3rd | Braintree Town | 0

==== Semifinals ====
2 May 2007
1st Leg

| Bishop's Stortford | 1–1 | Salisbury City |
|---|---|---|
| | | Matthews 64' |

Woodside Park, Bishop's Stortford
Attendance: 1,049
2nd Leg

| Salisbury City | 3–1 (a.e.t.) | Bishop's Stortford |
|---|---|---|
| Tubbs 18'; Matthews 100'; Fowler 118' | Report | Porter 34' |

The Raymond McEnhill Stadium, Salisbury
Attendance: 1,920

Salisbury City won 4–2 on Aggregate.

2 May 2007
1st Leg

| Havant & Waterlooville | 1–1 | Braintree Town |

Draper Tools Community Stadium, Havant
Attendance: 1,011
5 May 2007
2nd Leg

| Braintree Town | 1–1 | Havant & Waterlooville |
Penalties
| Penalty scored | 4–2 | Penalty scored Penalty missed |

Cressing Road, Braintree
Attendance: 1,539

Braintree Town won 4–2 on Penalties after tying 2–2 on Aggregate.

==== Play-Off Final ====
13 May 2007

| Salisbury City | 1–0 | Braintree Town |
|---|---|---|
| Tubbs 84' |

Broadhall Way, Stevenage
Attendance: 3,167
