= Tahj Jakins =

American soccer player

Personal information
- Date of birth: November 11, 1975 (age 50)
- Place of birth: Salt Lake City, Utah, U.S.
- Height: 6 ft 2 in (1.88 m)
- Position: Defender

Youth career
- 1993–1996: UCLA Bruins

Senior career*
Years	Team	Apps	(Gls)
1997–2000	Colorado Rapids	61	(0)
1999	→ Raleigh Capital Express (loan)	3	(0)
2000–2001	Kansas City Wizards	12	(0)
2000	→ MLS Pro-40 (loan)	10	(0)
2000	→ Raleigh Capital Express (loan)	5	(0)
2001	→ Pittsburgh Riverhounds (loan)	5	(0)
- * Club domestic league appearances and goals

Tahj Jakins (born November 11, 1975) is an American retired soccer defender who played five seasons in Major League Soccer.

== Youth ==
Born in Utah, Jakins grew up in southern California, playing for the North Huntington Beach Futbol Club. In 1993, he entered UCLA where he played on the school's soccer team. In 1996, he earned first team All American recognition. That year, he also played in two games with the U.S. national B-Team, but was never called up to the senior national team.

== Professional ==
On February 1, 1997, the Colorado Rapids selected Jakins with the first pick in the 1997 MLS College Draft. He was a regular with the Rapids for three seasons. In 2000, he played one game before being waived on April 7, 2000. The Kansas City Wizards then signed him. He played two games for them that season, but spent several loan periods away from the team. In 2000, he played for the MLS Pro-40 and Raleigh Capital Express of the USL A-League. In 2001, he went on loan to the Pittsburgh Riverhounds. The Wizards waived Jakins on November 17, 2001. He may have also played for the Minnesota Thunder.
