= Miklos Molnar =

Danish footballer (born 1970)

Personal information
- Full name: Miklos Jon Molnar
- Date of birth: 10 April 1970 (age 56)
- Place of birth: Copenhagen, Denmark
- Height: 1.79 m (5 ft 10 in)
- Position: Striker

Youth career
- B 1908
- Fremad Amager

Senior career*
Years	Team	Apps	(Gls)
1987–1988	Hvidovre IF	31	(7)
1989	Frem	26	(14)
1990–1991	Standard Liège	41	(16)
1991–1992	→ Servette (loan)	34	(18)
1992–1994	Saint-Étienne	19	(2)
1994	Lyngby	18	(6)
1994–1995	FSV Frankfurt	20	(12)
1995–1996	Herfølge Boldklub	21	(10)
1996–1997	Lyngby	38	(29)
1997–2000	Sevilla	44	(16)
2000	Kansas City Wizards	17	(12)
2011	B1908	1	(0)
Total		310	(142)

International career
1986–1988	Denmark U19	7	(4)
1989–1992	Denmark U21	21	(8)
1990–2000	Denmark	18	(2)

Managerial career
- 2011: B1908 (director of football)
- * Club domestic league appearances and goals

Miklos Jon Molnar (Hungarian: Molnár Miklós János; born 10 April 1970) is a Danish former professional footballer who played as a striker. Nicknamed the "Danish Dynamite", Molnar played for a number of European clubs as well as the Denmark national team. He was the top goalscorer of the 1989 and 1997 Danish championships, and won the 2000 MLS Cup with American team Kansas City Wizards. He scored two goals in 18 caps for the Denmark national football team, and represented his country at the 1998 FIFA World Cup and UEFA Euro 2000 tournaments. He was also a member of the Denmark team competing at the 1992 Summer Olympics.

After retiring from football in 2000, Molnar took up triathlon and competed semi-professionally. In 2005, he ran under three hours (2:59:20) in the Copenhagen Marathon and under 10 hours (9:50) in an Ironman in Austria.

== Biography ==
Born in Copenhagen, Molnar played football in Copenhagen clubs B 1908, Fremad Amager and Hvidovre IF. Molnar's talent was acknowledged, as he played seven games and scored four goals for the Danish under-19 youth national team from 1986 to 1988. He made his senior debut in 1987 for Hvidovre in the Danish 2nd Division, before moving to play semi-professionally for top-flight club Boldklubben Frem in 1989. Molnar got his senior level breakthrough when he became joint top goalscorer of the 1989 Danish 1st Division championship with 14 goals, as Frem finished eighth of 14 teams. He was selected for the Danish under-21 national team in June 1989. Several clubs were interested in buying Molnar, including Danish club AGF, English club Chelsea, French club Olympique Lyonnais and Standard Liège from Belgium.

In January 1990, Molnar moved abroad to play professionally for Standard Liège. In his first full season at Liège, Molnar scored 11 goals in 26 games, and he was called up to the Danish national team by national manager Richard Møller Nielsen. Molnar made his national team debut in September 1990, and he played a total three national team games until June 1991. When Liège hired new manager Arie Haan, Molnar did not feel appreciated and sought to be loaned out. He moved from Liège to Swiss club Servette FC in the summer 1991. Molnar became league top goalscorer, as he scored 18 goals in 34 games for Servette in the Swiss 1991–92 Nationalliga A championship.

Molnar was an integral part of the Danish under-21 national team from 1991 to 1992, forming a successful attacking partnership with Peter Møller. Molnar played all Denmark's games from the qualification to the semi-finals of the 1992 UEFA European Under-21 Football Championship, which qualified Denmark for the 1992 Summer Olympics in Barcelona. He was named 1991 Danish under-21 Player of the Year. Molnar played all of Denmark's three games at the 1992 Olympics final tournament, but was sent off for a physical scuffle with a defender in Denmark's final game before elimination against the Australia under-23s. He ended his under-21 career after the 1992 Olympics, having scored a total eight goals in 21 caps.

Having ended his loan at Servette, Molnar looked to find a new club in the summer 1992. Molnar was bought by French club AS Saint-Étienne for FRF 6.000.000. He did not fit into Saint-Étienne's technical short passing tactics, and did not find goalscoring success at the club.

He was released from his contract in January 1994, and moved back home to Denmark. In February 1994, he agreed to play for Lyngby BK in the top-flight Danish championship, now called the Danish Superliga. With the stated ambition of moving abroad, Molnar played half a year at Lyngby, but did not get along with Lyngby manager Michael Schäfer. He moved to German club FSV Frankfurt in September 1994. Despite scoring 12 goals in 20 games in the 1994–95 German 2nd Bundesliga season, Molnar could not keep Frankfurt from relegation into the lower Regionalliga division.

Molnar went home to Denmark, and started playing for Superliga club Herfølge BK in September 1995. When Lyngby's first-choice striker David Nielsen left the club in June 1996, Molnar moved back to his old club to fill the spot. He was the leading goal scorer in the 1996–97 Danish Superliga with 26 goals in 33 games, and was recalled to the Danish national team by new national manager Bo Johansson, after a hiatus of more than five years. After three goals in five games at the start of the 1997–98 Superliga season, Molnar was sold to Spanish club Sevilla FC in the secondary Segunda División league, where he joined fellow Danish international Thomas Rytter.

In his first year at Sevilla, Molnar scored ten goals in 27 games, and he was included in the Danish squad for the 1998 World Cup. He took part in one match at the tournament, when he most remarkably came on as a substitute in the 58th minute of the 1–1 draw with South Africa, only to be sent off eight minutes later. His second season at Sevilla was not as successful, and Molnar was dropped from the team. When visiting American international midfielder Chris Henderson in Colorado, a former teammate of his, Molnar had been fascinated by the atmosphere in the American Major League Soccer (MLS) championship. In January 2000, he moved to MLS to play for Kansas City Wizards. While at the Wizards, he was included in the Danish squad for the 2000 European Championship in June 2000. He played a single match at the tournament, before ending his national team career. He retired from football in October 2000, after scoring the game-winning goal during the 2000 MLS Cup, as the Wizards beat Chicago Fire 1–0.

On 2 October 2011, he got a comeback, playing 20 minutes for his childhood-club, B1908, in a 2nd division game.

== Honours ==
- 1991 Danish under-21 Player of the Year
- MLS Cup: 2000
