= Chris Brown (soccer, born 1977) =

American soccer midfielder and forward

Personal information
- Full name: Christopher Brown
- Date of birth: March 10, 1977 (age 49)
- Place of birth: Portland, Oregon, United States
- Height: 5 ft 11 in (1.80 m)
- Positions: Midfielder; forward

Youth career
- 1995–98: Portland Pilots

Senior career*
Years	Team	Apps	(Gls)
1999–2003	Kansas City Wizards	123	(16)
2003–2004	New England Revolution	3	(3)
2004	San Jose Earthquakes	11	(2)
2005–2007	Real Salt Lake	60	(7)
2008	Portland Timbers	27	(8)
Total		224	(36)
- * Club domestic league appearances and goals

Chris Brown (born March 10, 1977, in Portland, Oregon) is an American soccer midfielder and forward who last played for Portland Timbers of USL-1.

== Youth ==
Brown is an alumnus of Jesuit High School in Portland Oregon where he played soccer under the guidance of Dave Nicholas, varsity coach for the Crusaders. Brown played college soccer at the University of Portland from 1995 to 1998, scoring a total of 33 goals in his four years there, and being awarded for the MAC Award as a senior.

== Professional ==
On February 2, 1999, Brown was selected fifth overall in the 1999 MLS College Draft by the Kansas City Wizards. He immediately earned a spot in the Wizards rotation as a rookie, playing in 28 games and starting 19, while scoring four goals and making three assists. He saw reduced playing time in 2000 after the Wizards' acquisition of Miklos Molnar, appearing in 22 games but only registering one assist; he did, however, make four appearances, two of them starts, assisting Kansas City in winning their first MLS Cup. Brown regained his starting spot in 2001, and would fluctuate between being a starter and a valuable substitute for Kansas City for the next three years.

However, during the 2003 season, the Wizards traded Brown along with Darío Fabbro to the New England Revolution in exchange for Wolde Harris and Jorge Vazquez. In his first start there, Brown's explosive scoring yielded him a hat-trick. However, he was traded again during the 2003 off-season to the San Jose Earthquakes the then reigning MLS champions, making it difficult for Brown to displace veteran team members and capture a starting position. In San Jose, he finished the season with two goals and one assist in eleven appearances. When the MLS announced two expansion teams, Brown was recruited by John Ellinger inaugural coach of Real Salt Lake to come and play for him there where he has remained a versatile and consistent starter. He was waived at the end of 2007 and signed for USL-1 side Portland Timbers in January, 2008. In January 2009, Brown announced his retirement from playing professional soccer.
