= George F. Donnelly Cup =

Association football competition

The George F. Donnelly Cup was an annual amateur soccer competition organized by the United States Adult Soccer Association. It is named after George F. Donnelly, president of the former National Soccer League and prominent figure in promoting soccer in the United States.

The competition includes a men's tournament and a women's tournament. Each tournament is composed of four "Regional Select" teams (one for each region in the USASA), who have competed as "State Select" teams in regional qualifying tournaments. These select teams are made up of the best amateur players within any given state's soccer association.

The Donnelly Cup, until 2009, was held each year during the Martin L. King Jr. holiday weekend in January. Prior to 2003, it was conducted during Thanksgiving Day weekend in November.

In 2010, the competition was staged during July in Lancaster, MA, and won for the third time by the Connecticut State Soccer Association (CSSA) entry.

== Champions ==
=== Men ===
- 2010 - Connecticut State Select Team Region I
- 2008 - Illinois State Select Team Region II
- 2007 - Illinois State Select Team Region II
- 2006 - North Texas State Select Team Region III
- 2005 - North Texas State Select Team Region III
- 2004 - California-South State Select Team Region IV
- 2003 - California-South State Select Team Region IV
- 2002 - California-South State Select Team Region IV
- 2001 - Connecticut State Select Team Region I
- 2000 - Eastern New York State Select Team Region I
- 1999 - Connecticut State Select Team Region I
- 1998 - Oregon State Select Team Region IV
- 1997 - Florida State Select Team Region III
- 1996 - California-North State Select Team Region IV
- 1995 - Indiana State Select Team Region II
- 1994 - Eastern New York State Select Team Region I
- 1993 - California-South State Select Team Region IV
- 1992 - Florida State Select Team Region III
- 1991 - Washington State Select Team Region IV
- 1990 - Minnesota State Select Team Region II

=== Women ===
- 2008 - Utah State Select Team Region IV
- 2007 - Illinois State Select Team Region II
- 2006 - California South State Select Team Region IV
- 2005 - California South State Select Team Region IV
- 2004 - Illinois State Select Team Region II
- 2003 - California-North State Select Team Region IV
- 2002 - California-North State Select Team Region IV
- 2001 - Massachusetts State Select Team Region I
- 2000 - California-North State Select Team Region IV
- 1999 - Utah State Select Team Region IV
- 1998 - Oregon State Select Team Region IV
- 1997 - California-North State Select Team Region IV
- 1996 - Eastern New York State Select Team Region I
- 1995 - California-South State Select Team Region IV
- 1994 - Minnesota State Select Team Region II
- 1993 - Metropolitan D.C.-Virginia State Select Team Region I
- 1992 - Metropolitan D.C.-Virginia State Select Team Region I
- 1991 - Metropolitan D.C.-Virginia State Select Team Region I
- 1990 - California-North State Select Team Region IV
