= USASA National Women's Amateur =

American women's soccer tournament

The USASA National Women's Amateur is an American women's soccer tournament run by the United States Adult Soccer Association. It began in 1980 and was the top-level national tournament for women's soccer in the United States until the formation of the Women's Open in 1996.

While USASA always accepted applications for the Amateur, the competition was not held at the annual national finals weekend from 2009-2012.

The following is a list of Women's Amateur champions.

Pre-Open Era

- 1980: Seattle PCI Sharks (WA)
- 1981: Romiosa F.C. (Note: Seattle PCI Sharks in 1980) (WA) (2)
- 1982: F.C. Lowenbrau (Note: Seattle PCI Sharks in 1980 and Romiosa F.C. in 1981) (WA) (WA) (3)
- 1983: Michelob Ladies (TX)
- 1984: Chapel Hill Kix (NC)
- 1985: Michelob Ladies (TX) (2)
- 1986: Fairfax Wildfire (VA)
- 1987: Michelob Ladies (TX) (3)
- 1988: California Tremors (CA)
- 1989: Michelob Ladies (TX) (4)
- 1990: Opus County S.C. (MA)
- 1991: Texas Challenge (TX)
- 1992: Ajax America (CA)
- 1993: Ajax America (CA)(2)
- 1994: Sacramento Storm (CA)
- 1995: Sacramento Storm (CA) (2)

Open Era

- 1996: Soccer Academy United (VA)
- 1997: Soccer Academy United (VA) (2)
- 1998: Soccer Academy United (VA) (3)
- 1999: Colorado Rush (CO)
- 2000: Real Colorado Cougars (Note: Colorado Rush in 1999) (CO) (2)
- 2001: J.B. Marine S.C. (MO)
- 2002: St. Paul Blackhawks (MN)
- 2003: Hibernian Saints (WA)
- 2004: Chicago Eclipse Select (IL)
- 2005: Chicago Eclipse Select (IL) (2)
- 2006: Chicago Eclipse Select (IL) (3)
- 2007: New York Athletic Club (NY)
- 2008: Turbo D'Feeters (TX)
- 2009-2012: Not Held
- 2013: ASA Chesapeake Charge (MD)
- 2014: Olympic Club (CA)
- 2023: NTX Image
- 2024: Pan World Elite (UT)
- 2025: Pan World Elite (UT) (2)
- 2026: Rochester Lazers
