= 2007 National Amateur Cup =

Soccer tournament

Following are the results of the 2007 National Amateur Cup, the annual open cup held by the United States Adult Soccer Association.

The competition was won by Boston Olympiakos.

== Region I ==
Preliminary round

May 13, 2007
1:00PM

| Aegean Hawks | 1-2 | AC United |
|---|---|---|
| 1H' | | Danny Skelton; 2OT' Scott Zakroski |

Washington, DC

Quarterfinals

May 27, 2007

| AC United | 5-0 | Phoenix |

Columbia, MD
May 27, 2007

| Baltimore Colts | 7-0 | Wallace FC |

Brooklandville, MD
May , 2007

| Boston Olympiakos | - |

May , 2007

| Danbury United | - |

Semifinals

May 30, 2007
1:00PM

| AC United | 0-2 | Baltimore Colts |
|---|---|---|
| | | Sebastian Haensel (2) |

Baltimore, MD
May 2007

| Boston Olympiakos | 2-0 | Danbury United |

Final

June 24, 2007
12:00PM

| Boston Olympiakos | 3-0 | Baltimore Colts |

Oakford, PA

== Region II ==
The Region II tournament took place at Lakeshore Youth Soccer Complex in Stevensville, MI from June 15–17.

Group A

June 15, 2007

| Detroit United | 3-0 | Club Independiente |

June 15, 2007

| Bavarian | 3-1 | Indianapolis Rangers |

June 16, 2007

| Detroit United | 3-2 | Indianapolis Rangers |

June 16, 2007

| Bavarian | 11-0 | Club Independiente |

June 16, 2007

| Indianapolis Rangers | 5-4 | Club Independiente |

June 16, 2007

| Bavarian | 3-1 | Detroit United |

Group B

June 15, 2007

| Croatian Eagles | 4-1 | Lexington Wanderers |

June 15, 2007

| Scott Gallagher | 11-0 | BSC VIVA |

June 15, 2007

| AAC Eagles | 4-1 | Concordia SC |

June 16, 2007

| Lexington Wanderers | 4-0 | Concordia SC |

June 16, 2007

| Croatian Eagles | 4-3 | Scott Gallagher |

June 16, 2007

| AAC Eagles | 8-1 | BSC VIVA |

June 16, 2007

| Croatian Eagles | 0-0 | Concordia SC |

June 16, 2007

| AAC Eagles | 1-0 | Scott Gallagher |

June 16, 2007

| Lexington Wanderers | 5-2 | BSC VIVA |

June 17, 2007
8:00AM

| Croatian Eagles | 3-1 | Bavarian |

June 17, 2007
8:00AM

| AAC Eagles | 2-1 | Lexington Wanderers |

Saint Joseph, MI

== National Championship ==
Semifinals

August 3, 2007
6:00PM

| Hot Spurs | 1-5 | Boston Olympiakos |

Tukwila, WA
August 3, 2007
6:00PM

| A.A.C. Eagles | 2-1 | St. Petersburg Kickers |
|---|---|---|
| 55' Ryan Kneipper |

Tukwila, WA

=== Final ===
August 5, 2007
2:00PM

| Boston Olympiakos | 2–0 | A.A.C. Eagles |
|---|---|---|
| 23'; 73' Alfaro | (Report) |

Tukwila, WA

== USASA Open Cup ==
National Semifinals

August 3, 2007
9:00AM

| Indios USA | 3-1 | Aegean Hawks |
|---|---|---|
| 38' Giber Becerra; 45'+, 73' David Briseño | | 15' (pk) |

Tukwila, WA
August 3, 2007
9:00AM

| RWB Adria | 0-0 | Azzurri |
|---|---|---|
| | | Azzurri win PKs 4–3 |

Tukwila, WA

National Final

August 4, 2007
4:30PM

| Indios USA | 2-0 | Azzurri |
|---|---|---|
| 82' Brooks; 89' David Briceno |

Tukwila, WA

== See also ==
2007 U.S. Open Cup
