= 2022 Hank Steinbrecher Cup =

Tournament details
- Country: United States of America
- Dates: June 3 – June 5, 2022
- Teams: 4

Final positions
- Champions: Flint City Bucks (Fourth title)
- Runners-up: Denton Diablos FC

Tournament statistics
- Matches played: 3
- Goals scored: 8 (2.67 per match)

The 2022 Hank Steinbrecher Cup was the eighth edition of the United States Adult Soccer Association's (USASA) tournament whose winner is recognized with the title of U.S. National Amateur Champions. The two previous editions where canceled due to COVID-19 pandemic in the United States.

USL League Two (USL L2) side Flint City Bucks were the defending champion, having won the last three competitions.

== Host selection ==
Flint City Bucks were selected to host the tournament following their crowning as the 2019 National Amateur Champion. USASA director Duncan Riddle confirmed in March of 2022 that the Bucks would retain their rights to host the 2022 tournament following the two previous tournaments being canceled.

== Teams ==
The tournament featured the 2019 USASA National Amateur Cup winner Lansdowne Yonkers FC, 2021 National Premier Soccer League (NPSL) champion Denton Diablos FC and the defending Steinbrecher Cup winner Flint City Bucks. Ordinarily the tournament would have also featured the previous season's USL League 2 champion. However, the 2019 USL League 2 champion was the previously qualified Flint City Bucks, there was not a 2020 USL League 2 season, and the 2021 USL League 2 Champion Des Moines Menace where unable to travel for the tournament so in their place the 2022 NSL Spring Champion Regals SCA was invited.

== See also ==
- 2021 NPSL season
- 2021 USL League Two season
