= 2005 National Amateur Cup =

Soccer tournament

Following are the results of the 2005 National Amateur Cup, the annual amateur cup held by the United States Adult Soccer Association.

== Region I ==
Preliminary round

May 15, 2005

Medford	3-0	Bridgeport Internationals
		Bridgeport forfeits

May 15, 2005

Dynamos	5-2	Rahway Rio United

Quarterfinals

May 29, 2005

Medford	2-0	Phantoms Future

May 29, 2005

Kappa Real Wyckoff	5-1	KOHA

May 29, 2005

Wallace	0-1	Allied SC

June 12, 2005
2:00PM

Dynamos	1-0	Vereinigung Erzgebirge

Mt. Vernon

Semifinals

June 19, 2005

Medford	4-2	Kappa Real Wyckoff

June 19, 2005

Dynamos	1-3	Allied SC

VA

Final

June 26, 2005
4:00PM

Medford	1-5	Allied SC
		JC Cole (2); Tony Taminini (2); Joe Sladek

Oakford, PA

== Region II ==
The Region II tournament took place in Dayton, OH from June 16–18.

Assyrian Winged Bull (Michigan) advanced to the National finals.

== Region III ==
The Region III tournament took place in Plano, TX from May 27–30.

Barracudas (Texas) advance to National finals.

== Region IV ==
The Region IV tournament took place in Seattle, WA from June 3–5.

Group A

June 3, 2005
3:00PM

Denver Kickers	-	FC Swoosh

Seattle, WA
June 3, 2005
3:00PM

Guadalajara Atotonilco	1-3	Hibernian Saints

Seattle, WA
June 4, 2005
9:00AM

Guadalajara Atotonilco	-	Denver Kickers

Seattle, WA
June 4, 2005
9:00AM

FC Swoosh	2-5	Hibernian Saints

Seattle, WA
June 4, 2005
3:00PM

Denver Kickers	1-5	Hibernian Saints

Seattle, WA
June 4, 2005
3:00PM

FC Swoosh	-	Guadalajara Atotonilco

Seattle, WA

Group B

June 3, 2005
3:00PM

Seattle Americans	-	Westside Action

Seattle, WA
June 3, 2005
3:00PM

Santa Clara Sporting	-	Lazio

Seattle, WA
June 4, 2005
9:00AM

Seattle American	-	Santa Clara Sporting

Seattle, WA
June 4, 2005
9:00AM

Westside Action	-	Lazio

Seattle, WA
June 4, 2005
3:00PM

Westside Action	-	Santa Clara Sporting

Seattle, WA
June 4, 2005
3:00PM

Lazio	-	Seattle American

Seattle, WA

Final

June 5, 2005
9:00AM

Hibernian Saints	2-1	Santa Clara Sporting

Seattle, WA

== National Championship ==
Semifinals

August 5, 2005
7:00PM

Hibernian Saints	2-1	Assyrian Winged Bull

Frisco, TX
August 5, 2005
8:00PM

Barracudas	0-3	Allied SC

Frisco, TX

Final

August 7, 2005
11:00AM

Hibernian Saints	2-1	Allied SC

Frisco, TX

== U.S. Open Cup Qualifying ==
=== Region I ===
Quarterfinals

April 24, 2005

Perth Amboy ZPA	1-0	Kappa Real Wyckoff

May 8, 2005

Greek–American Atlas	3-2	Bridgeport International

May 8, 2005

Phantoms Future	0-3	Green Briar Rebels
Phantoms forfeit

May 8, 2005

Baltimore Colts	4–1	Ukrainian Nationals

Semifinals

May 22, 2005

Greek–American Atlas	6-3	Green Briar Rebels

May 22, 2005

Baltimore Colts	4-2	Perth Amboy ZPA

Final

June 26, 2005
6:00PM

Greek–American Atlas	1-2	Baltimore Colts
		Pat Healey

Oakford, PA

=== Region II ===
Quarterfinals

April 23, 2005

Polonia Mielec	2-1	Carpathia Kickers
1H'		1H'; 89'

Buffalo Grove, IL
April 23, 2005

AAC Eagles	2-0	Milwaukee Kickers
44', 67'

Buffalo Grove, IL
April 23, 2005

Reggae Boyz	7-4	Irish American
1H' (2); 2H' (5)		1H' (2); 2H' (2)

Indianapolis, IN
April 23, 2005

Grand Rapids Alliance	1-3	St. Louis Kutis

Grand Rapids, MI

Semifinals

May 7, 2005
2:00PM

Polonia Mielec	3-1	Reggae Boyz

May 7, 2005
2:00PM

AAC Eagles	W-L	St. Louis Kutis

Referee: Tim Deters

Final

May 21, 2005
2:00PM

Polonia Mielec	2-4	AAC Eagles
10' Tomasz Duniec		6' Marek Nowacki; 94' David Otachel

=== Region III ===
Roma (Dallas) and Azzurri (North Texas) qualify for Lamar Hunt Open Cup. Azzurri advance to USASA Open Cup finals.

=== Region IV ===
Group A

May 20, 2005
3:00PM

Arizona Sahuaros	2-0	Club Marin

Sacramento, CA
May 20, 2005
3:00PM

Barza	1-3	Salinas Valley Samba

Sacramento, CA
May 21, 2005
9:00AM

Salinas Valley Samba	3-0	Arizona Sahuaros

Sacramento, CA
May 21, 2005
9:00AM

Club Marin	2-0	Barza

Sacramento, CA
May 21, 2005
3:00PM

Arizona Sahuaros	4-0	Barza

Sacramento, CA
May 21, 2005
3:00PM

Salinas Valley Samba	2-0	Club Marin

Sacramento, CA

Group B

May 20, 2005
5:00PM

Northern Nevada Aces	0-9	Sacramento Knights

Sacramento, CA
May 20, 2005
5:00PM

Sonoma County Sol	6-0	Titanes
David Brinceno (2); Miguel Santoyo; Brandon Boone; Tyler Hurst; Tony Bussard

Sacramento, CA
May 21, 2005
11:00AM

Titanes	3-2	Northern Nevada Aces

Sacramento, CA
May 21, 2005
11:00AM

Sacramento Knights	1-2	Sonoma County Sol
67'		26' Brandon Boone; 62' Chris Daly

Sacramento, CA
May 21, 2005
5:00PM

Northern Nevada Aces	0-10	Sonoma County Sol
		20' Justin Delacruz; 21', 2H' Carlos Barrajas; Tony Brussard; Tyler Hurst (2); Adrian Zavala; Brandon Boone; David Briceno; Derek Shaffer

Sacramento, CA
May 21, 2005
5:00PM

Titanes	0-4	Sacramento Knights

Sacramento, CA

Final

22 May 2005
9:00AM

Salinas Valley Samba	1–1 (a.e.t.)	Sonoma County Sol
90'+		67' Miguel Santoyo (pk)
Penalties
Penalty scored Penalty missed	4–5	(penalty scored) Purdy; (penalty scored) Miguel Santoyo; (penalty scored) Trevor Hurst; (penalty scored) Carlos Barrajas; (penalty scored) Adrian Zavala

Sacramento, CA

=== National Semifinals ===
August 5, 2005
9:00AM

Sonoma County Sol	1-2	AAC Eagles

Frisco, TX
August 5, 2005
9:00AM

Azzurri	0-4	Baltimore Colts

Frisco, TX

=== National Final ===
August 6, 2005
10:30AM

AAC Eagles	2-5	Baltimore Colts

Frisco, TX

== See also ==
2005 U.S. Open Cup
