= Atlanta Datagraphic =

Atlanta Datagraphic was an amateur U.S. soccer club sponsored by the Datagraphic firm of Atlanta, Georgia. It won the 1979 National Amateur Cup.

== History ==
In 1979, George D. Baker, president of Datagraphic, a printing firm located in Atlanta, Georgia, founded a men’s amateur soccer team. The team rapidly proved itself as one nation’s top amateur clubs as it took the 1979 National Amateur Cup. Over the years, the club expanded to include youth, women’s and over-30 teams. By the mid-1980s, the club had over thirty teams. In 1986, the senior team was coached by David Chadwick. In 1992, it fielded a semi-professional club, the Atlanta Datagraphic Magic in the USISL. Datagraphic played in the Atlanta District Amateur Soccer League during the 1980s.

== Coaches ==
- Tim Hankinson 1984
- David Chadwick 1986
- John Staniforth 1991
- Daniel "Danny" Hay 1982
- Doug Yearwood 1998

== Honors ==
National Amateur Cup

- Winner (1) – 1979
- Runner Up (2) – 1980, 1987
- 3rd in nation Under 19 – 1982

National O30 Amateur Cup

- Runner Up 1998
