= 2002 National Amateur Cup =

Soccer tournament

Following are the results of the 2002 National Amateur Cup, the annual amateur cup held by the United States Adult Soccer Association.

== Quarterfinals ==
June 16, 2002

| Baltimore Colts | W-L |

Horsham, PA
June 22, 2002

| Milwaukee Bavarians | 1-0 | Minnesota Inferno |
|---|---|---|
| 88' Ryan Seymour |

Milwaukee, WI
May 27, 2002
11:00AM

| Iguana | 4-1 | Haz Binz |
|---|---|---|
| John Sheringham (2); Brian Gibson; Damon Sparks | | Joel Johnson |

Gulfport, MS
June 2, 2002

| North Huntington Beach | 3-1 | Seattle Hibernian |

== Semifinals ==
July 19, 2002
6:30PM

| Milwaukee Bavarians | 2-1 | North Huntington Beach |
|---|---|---|
| Adam Riesz; 88' Ryan Seymour |

Oakford, PA
July 19, 2002
8:00PM

| Baltimore Colts | 3-1 | Iguana |
|---|---|---|
| Machel Millwood (3) |

Oakford, PA

== Final ==
July 21, 2002
1:00PM

| Milwaukee Bavarians | 3-1 | Baltimore Colts |
|---|---|---|
| Ryan Seymour; Adam Riesz; Jake Provan |

Oakford, PA

Champions: Milwaukee Bavarian
Coach: Tom Zaiss
Roster: Adam Reisz, Scott Kreitmeier, Giovanni Luna, Jake Banas, Joe Hammes, Delroy Perrin, Scott Dombrowski, Jake Provan, Steve Provan, Dominic DaPra, David Moxom, Brian Doherty, Ryan Seymour, Joel DaPra, Joaquin Santos, Rob Walton, Craig Posselt, Dean Beck, Matt Schmidt, Jon Coleman, Jamie Eichmann.

=== Men's Over 30 ===
Quarterfinals

June 2002

| Bier FC | 4-3 | Boston Bulldogs |

June 19, 2002

| Milwaukee Bavarians | 6-2 | Scott Gallagher |
|---|---|---|
| Jason Willan (3); Nick Igel (2) |

Oakford, PA
May 27, 2002
9:00AM

| Azzurri | 2-1 | Kickers |

Gulfport, MS
June 2, 2002

| Seattle Hibernian | 4-1 | New Mexico Rangers |

Semifinals

July 19, 2002
3:00PM

| Milwaukee Bavarians | 0-2 | Hibernian Saints |

Oakford, PA
July 19, 2002
5:00PM

| Bier FC | 2-3 | Azzurri |

Oakford, PA

Final

July 21, 2002
9:00AM

| Hibernian Saints | 3-1 | Azzurri |

Oakford, PA

=== Men's Under 23 ===
Semifinals

June 19, 2002
11:30AM

| FC Milwaukee | 0-3 | Colorado Rush |

Oakford, PA
July 19, 2002
1:30PM

| Baltimore Bays | 5-2 | Selection Dallas |

Oakford, PA

Final

July 21, 2002
9:00AM

| Baltimore Bays | 2-1 | Colorado Rush |

Oakford, PA

=== Men's Under 20 ===
Semifinals

June 19, 2002
10:30AM

| Kansas City Athletics | 9-1 | Fontana Express |

Oakford, PA
July 19, 2002
12:30PM

| Westchester | 3-4 | Lakeland Lazers |

Oakford, PA

Final

| July 21, 2002 | Kansas City Athletics | 2–2 | Lakeland Lazers | Oakford, PA |
Note: Kansas City Athletics won 4–2 on penalties

=== Women's Open ===
June 16, 2002

| United German Hungarians | 1-2 | Peninsula Aztecs |
|---|---|---|
| Darci Borski |

Horsha, PA

Semifinals

July 19, 2002
9:00AM

| TC Stars | 0-1 | California Blues |

Oakford, PA
June 19, 2002
9:30AM

| Peninsula Aztecs | w/o | Memphis Mercury |

Oakford, PA

Final

July 20, 2002
4:00PM

| California Blues | 5-0 | Peninsula Aztecs |

Oakford, PA

=== Women's Amateur ===
June 16, 2002

| United German Hungarians | 2-0 | Opus County |
|---|---|---|
| Julie Ortale; Emily Karabell |

Horsham, PA
May 24, 2002

| Turbo/Defeeters | 2-3 | HAS Challengers |

Gulfport, MS

Semifinals

July 19, 2002
2:30PM

| St. Paul Blackhawks | 5-4 | Hibernian Saints |

Oakford, PA
July 19, 2002
4:30PM

| United German Hungarians | 3-2 | HAS Challengers |
|---|---|---|
| Megan McLaughlin (2); Nettie Hibbs |

Oakford, PA

Final

July 21, 2002
11:00AM

| St. Paul Blackhawks | 2-1 | United German Hungarians |
|---|---|---|
| Rachel Roth; 42' Brianna Valento | | 85' Erin Farchic (pk) |

Oakford, PA

=== Women's Over–30 ===
May 24, 2002

| North Texas United | 3-2 | South Texas Allies |

Gulfport, MS

Semifinals

July 19, 2002
3:30PM

| DSPX Stars | 1-5 | Forza |

Oakford, PA
July 19, 2002
5:30PM

| Total Sports Pavilion | 2-3 | Texas United |

Oakford, PA

Final

July 21, 2002
9:30AM

| Forza | 6-0 | Texas United |

Oakford, PA

=== Women's Under 23 ===
Semifinals

July 19, 2002
1:00PM

| FC Milwaukee | 2-3 | Utah Spiders |

Oakford, PA
July 19, 2002
11:00AM

| Oakwood | 4-1 | Dallas Sting |

Oakford, PA

Final

July 21, 2002
11:30AM

| Utah Spiders | 2-1 | Oakwood |

Oakford, PA

=== Women's Under 20 ===
Semifinals

July 19, 2002
11:30AM

| Eclipse Select | 4-0 | Utah Futtball Club |

Oakford, PA
July 19, 2002
1:30PM

| PDA | 2-1 | Dallas Sting |

Oakford, PA

Final

July 21, 2002
9:30AM

| Eclipse Select | 3-0 | PDA |

Oakford, PA

== Veterans Cup ==
The Veteran's Cup took place from June 19–23 at the Southern West Virginia Sports Complex in Beckley, WV.

Men's Over 40 1st Division
Semifinals

June 22, 2002
5:00PM

| Radnor United | 5-1 | Greensboro United |

Beckley, WV
June 22, 2002
5:00PM

| Mecklenburg | 3-0 | Dayton United |

Beckley, WV

Final

June 23, 2002
8:00AM

| Radnor United | 1-0 | Mecklenburg |
|---|---|---|
| 8' Jan Emmons |

Beckley, WV

Men's Over 40 Premier
Semifinals

June 22, 2002
7:00PM

| MGS Bavarian | 2-0 | New Haven United |

Beckley, WV
June 22, 2002
7:00PM

| Palm Beach Ambassador | 4-2 | Stoneham |

Beckley, WV

Final

June 23, 2002
10:00AM

| MGS Bavarian | 0-1 | Palm Beach Ambassadors |
|---|---|---|
| | | 103' Orlando Rodriguez |

Beckley, WV

Men's Over 50
Semifinals

June 22, 2002
7:00PM

| New England Over The Hill | 2-0 | Kutis |

Beckley, WV
June 22, 2002
7:00PM

| Greensboro United | 3-0 | Oklahoma Strays |

Beckley, WV

Final

June 23, 2002
10:00AM

| New England Over The Hill | 4-0 | Greensboro United |

Beckley, WV

Women's Over 40
Semifinals

June 22, 2002
5:00PM

| Camp Springs | 4-1 | Annandale Five |

Beckley, WV
June 22, 2002
5:00PM

| He Kini Popo | 3-0 | Copa De Vida |

Beckley, WV

Final

June 23, 2002
8:00AM

| Camp Springs | 1-0 | He Kini Popo |

Beckley, WV

Women's Over 50
Semifinals

| June 22, 2002 | Michigan Shooting Stars | 1–1 | Virginia Freedom | Beckley, WV |
| 5:00PM |
Note: Michigan Shooting Stars won 3–2 on penalties

June 22, 2002
5:00PM

| Sheer Power | 1-0 | Evergreen Steelers |

Beckley, WV

Final

June 23, 2002
10:00AM

| Michigan Shooting Stars | 0-1 | Sheer Power |
|---|---|---|
| | | Jan McFadden |

Beckley, WV

== Coed Cup ==
The Coed Cup took place from August 23–25 at Hampton Roads Soccer Complex in Virginia Beach, VA.

Open Division
Semifinal
Fados Irish Pub Conquistadores 1–0 Mall Rats

Final
Fados Irish Pub Conquistadores 3–2 Hassan Jones

Champion: Fados Irish Pub Conquistadores (Metro DC/Virginia)
Coach: Ramon Madan

Over 30 Division
Third place
Hot Pink Panthers 4–1 Olympia I

Final
Dave's Crew 1–0 Florida Kickers

Champion: Dave's Crew (Metro DC/Virginia)

== Open Cup Qualifying ==
=== Quarterfinals ===
June 2, 2002
2:00PM

| Vereinigung Erzgebirge | W-L | Rochester Italia |

Binghamton, NY
May 19, 2002

| AAC Eagles | 5-0 | Indiana |
|---|---|---|
| 8' Klopp; 18' Beck; 35' Dan Stebbins; 50', 53' Cartledge |

Chicago, IL
May 26, 2002
3:00PM

| Real Madrid | 2-1 | DS United |

Gulfport, MS
June 2, 2002

| Tyneside United | W-L | Mexico SC |

Salt Lake City, UT

=== Semifinals ===
July 19, 2002
8:30AM

| AAC Eagles | 8-2 | Tyneside United |

Oakford, PA
July 19, 2002
9:30AM

| Vereinigung Erzgebirge | 2-1 | Real Madrid |

Oakford, PA

=== Final ===
July 20, 2002
2:00PM

| AAC Eagles | 3-0 | Vereinigung Erzgebirge |

Oakford, PA

== George F. Donnelly Cup ==
The 2002 tournament changed its usual Thanksgiving weekend date to the third week of January the following year. See 2003 for full results.

Men's Tournament
Champion: California-South (Region IV)

Women's Tournament
Champion: California-North (Region IV)

== See also ==
2002 U.S. Open Cup
