= Washington British Lions =

The Washington British Lions was an American soccer team which won the National Amateur Cup in 1969. The club were prominent in local leagues of Washington, D.C., and Maryland, including the National Soccer League. Between 1963 and 1968 they won four MSSA Cups run by the Maryland State Soccer Association, and reached another three finals, the last of which was in 1970. The Lions also enjoyed extended runs in the National Amateur Cup on several occasions culminating in their successful bid in 1969 final when they defeated Kutis of St. Louis 4-1. Another Maryland State Soccer Association affiliated club would not win the tournament again until Christos FC's 2016 success. Former Dundalk and Glenavon goalkeeper, Walter Durkan, also lined out for the Lions before going on to become a referee in the North American Soccer League.
