= Beadling Soccer Club =

Soccer club in Greater Pittsburgh

Beadling Soccer Club is an American soccer club primarily located in the South Hills suburbs of Pittsburgh, Pennsylvnia. It is the oldest continuously operating soccer club in the United States.

== History ==
Founded in 1898 as Pittsburgh Beadling, the club was originally formed and primarily made up of immigrant miners from Europe. In 1911, the team entered the Pittsburgh Press League, commonly known as the Miners League, after having spent its first thirteen years as an independent recreational team. In 1913, it won its first league title. Three years later, it went to its first West Penn Cup where it finished runner up to Homestead Steel Works. In 1919, it won its first West Penn Cup. The team later entered the Keystone League. In 1973, the National Soccer Hall of Fame inducted Joseph Delach, coach of Beadling. At some point, the club began fielding two teams, the RD and the Blues.

In 1984, the club added youth teams. The club has grown and currently operate multiple locations in Allegheny, Beaver, Butler, Washington, and Westmoreland Counties. Historically, the youth teams have competed in US Youth Soccer and US Club Soccer local and regional leagues and tournaments, with girls teams also participating in the Girls Academy League. In 2021, Beadling boys teams starting birth year 2008 joined the MLS Next league.

== Honors ==
West Penn Cup

- Winner: 1919
- Runner Up: 1916

National Amateur Cup

- Winner: 1954
- Runner Up: 1958
