= 1998 National Amateur Cup =

Soccer tournament

Following are the results of the 1998 National Amateur Cup, the annual amateur cup held by the United States Adult Soccer Association.

== Quarterfinals ==
June 7, 1998

Schwaben AC	2-0	Milwaukee Bavarians

Indianapolis, IN
May 1998

Cassal	W-L	Region IV

Albuquerque, NM
June 1998

Los Rayos	W-L	McCormick Kickers

Birmingham, AL
June 7, 1998

New York	3-2	Sunburst SC

Trenton, NJ

== Semifinals ==
July 17, 1998
5:00PM

Schwaben AC	1-0	Los Rayos

Chicago, IL
July 17, 1998
3:00PM

Cassal	2-0	New York

Chicago, IL

== Final ==
July 19, 1998
11:30AM

Schwaben	2-1	Cassal
40', 70' Robert Juszczyk		60' Ricardo Delgado (pk)

Chicago, IL

=== Men's Over 30 ===
Quarterfinals

June 1998

McCormick Kickers	W-L	Region II

June 1998

Greek Americans	W-L	Region IV

June 1998

St. Louis Kutis	W-L	Regional

Indianapolis, IN
June 7, 1998

Hibernian	4-0	Kilkenny Pub
		2', 67' Jeff Kraft; 10' John Abe; 80' Chris Webbert

Mercer County Park, Trenton, NJ
Attendance: 400

Semifinals

July 17, 1998
2:00PM

Kutis S.C.	3-1	McCormick Kickers
Steve Maurer; Kirk Moser; Jeff Cacciatore

Chicago, IL
July 17, 1998
11:00AM

Greek Americans	2-1	Kilkenny
Harry Nelson (3); Steve Mauer; John Hayes		Becker; Polahan

Chicago, IL

Final

July 19, 1998
9:30AM

SF Greek Americans	4-1	St. Louis Kutis
		Kevin Groark

Chicago, IL

=== Men's Under 23 ===
Semifinals

July 18, 1998

Scott Gallagher	3-1	Wolfpack
Jeff DiMaria; Ryan Benton; Ken Costello

Chicago, IL
July 18, 1998

ATU Eagles	3-0	Hermes

Chicago, IL

Final

July 19, 1998

Scott Gallagher	3-2	ATU Eagles
Mike Moriarty (2); Todd Hunter

Chicago, IL

Champions: Scott Gallagher (St. Louis)
Coach: Tommy Howe
Roster: Brian Benton, Mark Beste, Ken Costello, Kirk Daues, Jeff DiMaria, Mike Francis, Todd Hunter, Kevin Kalish, Casey Klipfel, Matt Little, Tim Matter, Mike Moriarty, Pat Moriarty, Vince Pinon, Dave Popp, Ed Schoenbein, Josh Woodworth.

=== Men's Under 20 ===
The Under–20 championship took place from July 23–26 at the Rose Mofford Sports Complex in Phoenix, AZ.

Region I
Semifinals

July 4, 1998

Columbia Darby	2-1	New Jersey Rovers
Jason Lockerman; Joe DeSalva

Edinboro, PA
July 4, 1998

Nether Providence Mustangs	L-W	Beadling Blue

Edinboro, PA

Final

July 5, 1998

Columbia Darby	5-0	Beadling Blue
3' Lockerman; 4' DiSalvo; 35' Wierzbowski; 43' Watson; 76' Buehler

Edinboro, PA

Region II
Semifinals

June 30, 1998

Club Ohio/Dynamo	4-1	Team KC
Brian Feldhaus; Miles Jablonka (2); Chris Lindemeyer		Mark Roennigke

Cincinnati, OH
June 30, 1998

Mequon United	4-3	Busch

Cincinnati, OH

Final

July 1, 1998
10:00AM

Club Ohio/Dynamo	3-1	Mequon United
6' Brian Feldhaus; 8' Bobby Biggs; 78' Tim Ashton

Cincinnati, OH

Region III

- Memphis Futbol Club

Region IV

- Colorado Rush Nike Warriors

National Semifinals

July 24, 1998
8:00AM

Columbia Darby	4-3	Memphis Futbol Club
51', 68' David Buehler; 56' Joseph DiSalvo (pk); 66' Evans		82' Semrau; 85' Gaither; 88' Taylor Sterling

Phoenix, AZ
July 24, 1998
5:30AM

Colorado Rush Nike Warriors	3-2	Club Ohio/Dynamo
15' Lisi; 34' Brian Mullan; 75' John Carroll		3' Feldhaus; 81' Campbell

Phoenix, AZ

Third place

July 26, 1998
8:00AM

Memphis Futbol Club	4-2	Club Ohio/Dynamo
13', 24', 44' Michael Shipman; 18' Steven Brooks		15' Biggs; 82' Barnes

Phoenix, AZ

Final

July 26, 1998
8:00AM

Colorado Rush Nike Warriors	5-1	Columbia Darby
22', 28' John Carroll; 74', 78', 81' Brian Mullan		79' Donohue

Phoenix, AZ

=== Women's Open ===
Semifinals

July 17, 1998
10:00AM

Ajax	5-0	Michigan Hawks

Chicago, IL
July 1998

Dallas Lightning	W-L	Region I winner

Finals

July 18, 1998
2:00 PM

California Ajax	5-0	Dallas Lightning
		Christine Keeley; Sonia Ibanez; Bryn Blalack; Yvette Okler

Chicago, IL

=== Women's Amateur ===
Quarterfinals

June 7, 1998

Soccer Academy	1-0	Opus County

Mercer County, NJ
July 7, 1998

Indiana Blaze	2-1	Michigan Hawks
Jennifer Martin; Alysa Pykett

Kuntz Stadium, Indianapolis, IN

Semifinals

July 17, 1998
1:00PM

Houston Challengers	4-1	Indiana Blaze

Chicago, IL
July 17, 1998
4:00PM

Colorado Rush	2-1	Soccer Academy United

Chicago, IL

Final

July 19, 1998
11:00AM

Houston Challengers	0-2	Soccer Academy United

Chicago, IL

=== Women's Over–30 ===
Semifinals

July 17, 1998
9:00AM

Dallas Sting 30	2-0	Busch S.C.

Chicago, IL
July 17, 1998
12:00PM

Zenith Bohemians	3-2	Brentwood Survivors

Chicago, IL

Final

July 19, 1998
9:00AM

Zenith Bohemians	4-1	Dallas Sting 30

Chicago, IL

=== Women's Under 23 ===
Semifinals

July 18, 1998

J.B. Marine	1-0	D'Feeters
Tracy Grose

Chicago, IL
July 18, 1998

ATU Eagles	6-2	Vista United

Chicago, IL

Final

July 25, 1998

J.B. Marine	4-1	ATU Eagles
Tracy Grose; Courtney Coppedge; Erin Grimsley; Kasey Truman

Chicago, IL

Champions: J.B. Marine (St. Louis)
Coach: Mike Gauvain
Roster: Kristin Boeker, Sara Burkett, Courtney Coppedge, Tory Dolan, Becky Feldman, Erin Grimsley, Tracy Grose, Stefanie Kraay, Susan Kraeger, Liz LaTour, Krista Odenwald, Jamie Parker, Lindsey Rector, Molly Schmelzle, Christen Seaman, Emily Stevens, Amy Timmerman, Kasey Truman.

=== Women's Under 20 ===
The Under–20 championship took place from July 23–26 at the Rose Mofford Sports Complex in Phoenix, AZ.

Region I
Semifinals

July 4, 1998

Braddock Road Zephyr	3-0	Greater Boston Bolts

Edinboro, PA
July 4, 1998

Northport/Cow Harbor Elite	W-L	Northport/Cow Harbor Voyagers

Edinboro, PA

Final

July 5, 1998

Braddock Road Zephyr	1-0	Northport/Cow Harbor Elite
97' Jennifer Keefe

Edinboro, PA

Region II
Semifinals

June 30, 1998

Team Acceleration	2-1	Busch
Beth Wechsler; Michelle Burke

Cincinnati, OH
June 30, 1998

Michigan Hawks	2-0	Cardinal Premier

Cincinnati, OH

Final

July 1, 1998
10:00AM

Team Acceleration	3-2	Michigan Hawks
23' Janice Mentrup; 89' Claire Kohake; Amy Reinshagen (pk)		27' Dawson; Leplae

Cincinnati, OH

Region III

- Dallas Sting

Region IV

- Southern California Blues

National Semifinals

July 23, 1998
8:00AM

Braddock Road Zephyr	4-0	Team Acceleration
25' Moore; 44' Shreve; 82' Newell; 84' Botta

Phoenix, AZ
July 23, 1998
5:30AM

Dallas Sting	4-3	So California Blues
11' Meredith Florance; 60' Kara Brown; 90' Nikki Hales; 112' Nikki Hales (pk)		14' Gerhard; 80' Luke; 89' Hollis

Phoenix, AZ

Third place

July 25, 1998
8:00AM

So Cal Blues	4-0	Team Acceleration
35' Hollis; 50', 75' Clemens; 64' Luke

Phoenix, AZ

Final

July 25, 1998
8:00AM

Braddock Road Zephyr	2-1	Dallas Sting
35' Emily Janss; 62' Kathleen Tracy		13' Nikki Hales

Phoenix, AZ

== Veterans's Cup ==
Men's Over–40 Premier
Round Robin
Moon SC W–L Seattle Soccer West
SCASA Sundowners 1–1 Seattle Soccer West
Moon SC W–L New England Stars
SCASA Sundowners 4–0 New England Stars
SCACA Sundowners 3–0 Moon SC
Seattle Soccer West – New England Stars

Final

July 12, 1998

Moon SC	8-0	SCASA Sundowners

Bellingham, WA

Champions: Moon Soccer Club (West Pennsylvania)
Roster: Michael Bowdler, Mark Carol, Gabe D'Achille, Mehdi Faradi, Fran Farzan, Jim Frantti, William Kammerer, Bill Lorimer, Pat McKeown, Tom McKeown, Jeff Miller, Ray Pronto, Chas Reist, Emil Ros, Dave Tomalno, Andy Walker, Peter Wassen, Colin Williams.

Men's Over–50
Champions: Seattle Reign

Women's Over–40
Champions: Las Margaritas (Washington)

== U.S. Open Cup Qualifying ==
=== Region I ===
Quarterfinals

April 26, 1998

German American	2-0	Boston United

April 26, 1998

Bridgeport Italians	1-3	Greek Americans Atlas

April 26, 1998

Garfield Vistula	2-0	L.C.C. International

April 26, 1998

German Hungarians	2-1	High Topps

Semifinals

May 10, 1998

Greek–American/Atlas	W-L	German American

May 10, 1998

Garfield Vistula	5-1	United German Hungarian

Final

May 1998

Greek–American/Atlas	W-L	Garfield Vistula

Randall Island, NY

=== Region II ===
Semifinals

June 6, 1998

Wisla	4-0	Milwaukee Kickers

June 6, 1998

Kutis	W-L	Sectional finalist

Final

June 7, 1998

Chicago Wisla	1-0	St. Louis Kutis

=== Region III ===
Final

May 1998

Los Lobos	W-L	Region III finalist

=== Region IV ===
Semifinals

May 16, 1998

Fresno	4-2	Colorado
Rene Vela (3)

Albuquerque, NM
May 16, 1998
4:30PM

San Nicolas	4-3	Arizona
Rene Vela (3)

Albuquerque, NM

Final

May 17, 1998

San Nicolas	5-0	Fresno
Rene Vela (3); Thiago Martins (2)

Albuquerque, NM

== George F. Donnelly Cup ==
Tournament took place from November 27–29 at Nova Southeastern University in Ft. Lauderdale, FL. The following state select teams were represented:
Men– (Region I) Connecticut, (Region II) Nebraska, (Region III) South Carolina, (Region IV) Oregon.
Women– (Region I) Metropolitan D.C.–Virginia, (Region II) Illinois, (Region III) Tennessee, (Region IV) Oregon.

Men's Tournament

November 27, 1998
4:30PM

Nebraska	T-T	Oregon

Ft. Lauderdale, FL
November 27, 1998
6:30PM

Connecticut	3-1	South Carolina
Robert Jachym; Bogdan Lonevsky; Lee Williams

Ft. Lauderdale, FL
November 28, 1998
12:00PM

Oregon	7-1	Connecticut

Ft. Lauderdale, FL
November 28, 1998
12:00PM

South Carolina	L-W	Nebraska

Ft. Lauderdale, FL
November 29, 1998
11:00AM

Oregon	6-2	South Carolina

Ft. Lauderdale, FL
November 29, 1998
11:00AM

Connecticut	3-3	Nebraska
Robert Jachym (2); Gary Clark

Ft. Lauderdale, FL

MVP: Chris Brown (Oregon)
Champion: Oregon
Coaches: Clive Charles, Rob Baarts
Roster: Jason Boykoff, Chris Brown, Zack Chown, Jimmy Clarke, Kiley Couch, Steve Elliott, Danny Falcone, Roger Gantz, Luke Ganzar, Billy Merck, Lennie Quashie, Scott Sagar, Nick Vorberg, Jim Weber, Brian Winters.

Women's Tournament

November 27, 1998
4:30PM

Illinois	L-W	Metro D.C.–Virginia

Ft. Lauderdale, FL
November 27, 1998
6:30PM

Oregon	W-L	Tennessee

Ft. Lauderdale, FL
November 28, 1998
10:00AM

Illinois	L-W	Oregon

Ft. Lauderdale, FL
November 28, 1998
10:00AM

Metro D.C.–Virginia	W-L	Tennessee

Ft. Lauderdale, FL
November 29, 1998
9:00AM

Illinois	W-L	Tennessee

Ft. Lauderdale, FL
November 29, 1998
9:00AM

Metro D.C.–Virginia	2-7	Oregon

Ft. Lauderdale, FL

MVP: Justi Baumgardt (Oregon)
Champion: Oregon
Coaches: Clive Charles, Paul Gouldsbrough
Roster: Justi Baumgardt, Heather Beem, Joy Boswell, Courtney Carter, Sarah Charles, Valerie Fletcher, Erin Goodling, Tammy Gradwahl, Anne Lyons, Wynne McIntosh, Tracy Osborn, Nicole Pfeifer, Maria Schierman, Kristen Wair.

== U.S. Soccer Festival ==
The tournament took place at St. Paul's School in Concord, NH and Singer Family Park in Manchester, NH from August 2–8.

Men's Tournament

August 2, 1998
6:00PM

NH Phantoms	0-4	East
		24' Luzak; 51' Rhine; 67' Clarke; 75' Kvello

Concord, NH
Attendance: 150
Referee: Adam Gersting
August 3, 1998
3:00PM

U.S. U–18	2-3	West
32' Wickart; 71' Herrera		30' Engram; 73' Goodson; 85' Ochoa

Concord, NH
Referee: Emiliano Monje
August 3, 1998
7:30PM

NH Phantoms	1-8	South
49' Simmons		25', 43' Houser; 27' Redd; 30' Curtis; 48', 67' Briggs; 54' Robinson; 87' Wilson

Manchester, NH
Attendance: 373
Referee: Bob Thunelius
August 4, 1998
3:00PM

Midwest	1-3	East
14' Deist		10' Wolynick; 50', 54' Bob Rhine

Concord, NH
Referee: Brian Poeschel
August 5, 1998
6:00PM

West	3-5	Midwest
10', 79' Keith Defini; 88' Mark Hogenhout		10' Keith Defini20' Mondelli; 40' Jeff Dominguez; 50' Jeff Deist; 67' B. Adams; 77' Wojtek

Manchester, NH
Referee: Boris Lazari
August 5, 1998
8:00PM

U.S. U–18	1-1	South
39' Herrera (pk)		42' Binkley

Manchester, NH
Referee: Brad Branch
August 7, 1998
3:00PM

South	1-2	West
16' Wilson		10' Estrada; 20' Ochoa

Concord, NH
Referee: Harry Kaltsounis
August 7, 1998
6:00PM

U.S. U–18	4-0	East
22' Buddle; 33' Herrera; 90' Cooks		58' Own goal

Manchester, NH
Referee: Bob Peterson
August 7, 1998
8:00PM

Granite State All–Stars	1-7	Midwest
49' Walker		10', 29' Adams; 52', 78' Mullan; 62', 86', 87' Deist

Manchester, NH
Referee: Joe Pimentel

Exhibition

August 8, 1998
5:00PM

NH Phantoms	2-2	U.S.U–18
35' Tapia; 44' Fleming		30' Buddle; 85' Wickart

Manchester, NH
Referee: Steve Taylor

Third place

August 8, 1998
11:00AM

Midwest	5-4	South
23' DiGuardi; 59' Mondelli; 60', 71' Mullan; 74' Madrigal		41' Howser; 76' Robinson; 81', 90' Howser

Manchester, NH
Referee: Jose Maria Arias

Final

August 8, 1998
9:00PM

East	5-2	West
29' Kodiat; 41' Rhine; 45' John Wolyniec; 61' Clarke		26' Own goal 56' 65' Ochoa

Manchester, NH
Referee: Gibby Widner

Champions: USASA Region I East

Women's Tournament

August 3, 1998
3:00PM

U.S. U–18	5-0	South
13' Putz; 37' Burkett; 66' Wallis; 77' Borgman; 88' Worden

Concord, NH
Attendance: 55
Referee: Joe Pimental
August 3, 1998
3:00PM

West	1-1	Midwest
63' Koleski		90' Taylor

Concord, NH
Attendance: 10
Referee: Steve Taylor
August 3, 1998
3:00PM

U.S. U–16	2-1	East
18' Zepeda; 60' Morrell		37' Kurowski

Concord, NH
Attendance: 63
Referee: Harry Kaltsounis
August 4, 1998
3:00PM

East	2-4	South
35' Smith; 90' Salmon		17', 57' Fotopoulos; 25' Benoit; 28' Woodward

Concord, NH
Referee: Bob Peterson
August 4, 1998
6:00PM

U.S. U–16	3-3	West
43' Morrell; 55', 75' Veronica Zepeda		1', 38' Tara Koleski; 50' Carol Hatcher

Manchester, NH
Attendance: 75
Referee: Gibby Widener
August 4, 1998
8:00PM

U.S. U–18	2-1	Midwest
25' Welsh; 47' Patrick		39' Tajak

Manchester, NH
Referee: Jose Maria Arias
August 6, 1998
3:00PM

U.S. U–16	2-0	Midwest
52' Zepeda; 90' Edwards

Concord, NH
Referee: Brian Poeschel
August 6, 1998
3:00PM

South	2-5	West
45' Mielde; 51' Janss		35' Eaton; 39' Baumgardt; 67', 69', 73' Tara Koleski

Concord, NH
Referee: Adam Gersting
August 6, 1998
7:30PM

U.S. U–18	1-0	East
76' Wallis

Manchester, NH
Referee: Bob Thunelius

Exhibition

August 8, 1998
3:00PM

U.S. U–16	1-1	U.S.U–18
89' Aleisha Cramer		41' Christie Welsh

Manchester, NH
Attendance: 215
Referee: Brad Branch

Third place

August 8, 1998
1:00PM

Midwest	4-2	East
12', 32' Moorman; 80', 86' Sarver		11' Gibbons; 66' Kurowski

Manchester, NH
Referee: Boris Lazier

Final

August 8, 1998
7:00PM

South	1-4	West
36' Rawlings		4', 76' Baumgardt; 24', 77' Koleski

Manchester, NH
Referee: Emiliano Monje

Champions: USASA Region IV West

== See also ==
1998 U.S. Open Cup
