= 1997 National Amateur Cup =

Soccer tournament

Following are the results of the 1997 National Amateur Cup, the annual amateur cup held by the United States Adult Soccer Association.

== Quarterfinals ==
May 1997

McCormick Kickers	2-1	North Carolina

Dallas, TX
May 18, 1997

Los Angeles SC	1-0	Denver Kickers

Fullerton, CA
June 15, 1997

Milwaukee SC	5-2	Saints FC

Indianapolis, IN
June 8, 1997

VE White	2-1	Team Urbanski

West Windsor, NJ

== Semifinals ==
July 12, 1997
8:30PM

McCormick Kickers	1-0	Los Angeles SC
Martin Nebrelius

Portland, OR
July 12, 1997

Milwaukee SC	4-1	VE White
Peter Metz (2); Drew Watzka; 79' Tony Colvin

Portland, OR

== Final ==
July 13, 1997
9:30AM

McCormick Kickers	4-0	Milwaukee SC
Martin Nebrelius (2); Rob Heald; David Weimerskirk

Portland, OR

MVP: Martin Nebrelius (McCormick Kickers)

=== Men's Over 30 ===
Quarterfinals

May 1997

McCormick Kickers	4-0	Georgia

Dallas, TX
May 18, 1997

Micro Standard	4-2	SF Greek American
won PKs		lost PKs

Fullerton, CA
June 15, 1997

St. Louis Kutis	4-1	Cincinnati

Indianapolis, IN
June 8, 1997

La Dolce Vita	W-L	Needham United

West Windsor, NJ

Semifinals

July 12, 1997

McCormick Kickers	1-0	Micro Standard
88' Peter Ward (pk)

Portland, OR
July 12, 1997

St. Louis Kutis	6-2	La Dolce Vita
Harry Nelson (3); Steve Mauer; John Hayes		Becker; Polahan

Portland, OR

Final

July 13, 1997	McCormick Kickers	1–1	St. Louis Kutis	Portland, OR
	Craig Gordon
Note: McCormick Kickers won 4–1 on penalties

=== Men's Under 23 ===
Region I
Semifinals

June 29, 1997
11:00AM

Clark Comets	W-L	Soccer America Spirit

Trenton, NJ
June 29, 1997
11:00AM

East Brunswick United	-	Milan SC

Trenton, NJ

Final

June 29, 1997
3:00PM

Clark Comets	W-L

Trenton, NJ

Region II
Semifinal

July 14, 1997

Louisville Alliance	5-2	Illinois

Indianapolis, IN

Final

July 15, 1997

Louisville Alliance	3-2	Cleveland Kickers
Sean Mondelli (2); Jeff Bauer

Indianapolis, IN

Region III
Final

July 6, 1997

Dallas Speed	5-0	Houston Revolution

Houston, TX

Region IV
No entries.

National Semifinal

July 26, 1997
3:00PM

Louisville Alliance	3-2	Dallas Speed
1H', 44', 66' Matt Wilkerson

Trenton, NJ

National Final

July 27, 1997
1:00PM

Louisville Alliance	1-0	Clark Comets
12' Jeff Bauer

Trenton, NJ

MVP: Matt Wilkerson (LSA)
Champions: Louisville Soccer Alliance of Louisville, KY
Coach: Bob Ramsey
Roster: Jeff Bauer, Jed Boswell, Rick Dengelegi, Chris Egan, Sean Endicott, Tim Fisk, Matt Haynie, Jed Hayden, Juan Jackson, Steve Kitchens, John Landrum, Leighton Main, Brandon Mayes, Sean Mondelli, Eric Voyer, Matt Wilkerson, Erin Wilson, David Wright.

=== Women's Open ===
Semifinals

July 19, 1997

Sacramento Storm	W-L	Region I/II winner

Portland, OR
July 19, 1997

Dallas Lightning	W-L	Region I/II winner

Portland, OR

Finals

July 20, 1997
7:30 PM

Sacramento Storm	2-4	Dallas Lightning
		Christine Keeley; Sonia Ibanez; Bryn Blalack; Yvette Okler

Portland, OR

=== Women's Amateur ===
Semifinals

July 12, 1997

Soccer Academy United	2-1	Michigan Hawks

Portland, OR
July 12, 1997

California Tremors	5-1	Turbo

Portland, OR

Final

July 13, 1997

Soccer Academy United	2-1	California Tremors

Portland, OR

=== Women's Over–30 ===
Semifinals

July 12, 1997

San Francisco Vikings	3-0	Dallas Sting 30

Portland, OR
July 12, 1997

Annandale TBA	2-0	St. Louis Busch

Portland, OR

Final

July 13, 1997

San Francisco Vikings	4-3	Annandale TBA

Portland, OR

=== Women's Under 23 ===
Champions: Kingwood Wave of Texas.

== U.S. Open Cup Qualifying ==
=== Region I ===
Semifinals

May 3, 1997

Bridgeport Italians	4-3	Vistula Polish Club
Gary Cronin; Marek Jurkowski (2); Clark Brisson

Bridgeport, CT
Attendance: 200
May 10, 1997

Total Fitness	4-2	Baltimore Colts
Gil Hokayama; Marek Jurkonski; Marius Mierzejewski; Robert Tonewo

Final

May 18, 1997

Bridgeport Italians	4-2	Total Fitness
Gil Hokayama; Marek Jurkonski; Marius Mierzejewski; Robert Tonewo

Trenton, NJ

=== Region II ===
June 1997

Mequon United	4-1	Chicago Wisla
Scott Repa (2); 55' Eric Cherveny; Ted Storm

Indianapolis, IN

=== Region III ===
May 25, 1997

Los Lobos	1-0	Houston Rangers

Richardson, TX

=== Region IV ===
Semifinal

May 1997

Inter SC	4-3	Aurora

Final

May 18, 1997

Inter SC	2-0	Brewmen
Buzz Ponti (2)

Cal State Fullerton

== George F. Donnelly Cup ==
Tournament took place from November 28–30 at the Nova Southeastern University Soccer Complex in Ft. Lauderdale, FL.

Men's Tournament

November 1997

Florida	W-L	Metro D.C.–Virginia

Ft. Lauderdale, FL

Champion: Florida

Women's Tournament

November 28, 1997

Eastern New York	L-W	California North

Ft. Lauderdale, FL
November 28, 1997

Illinois	-	Florida

Ft. Lauderdale, FL
November 29, 1997

Eastern New York	T-T	Illinois

Ft. Lauderdale, FL
November 29, 1997

California North	-	Florida

Ft. Lauderdale, FL
November 30, 1997

Eastern New York	6-0	Florida

Ft. Lauderdale, FL
November 30, 1997

California North	-	Illinois

Ft. Lauderdale, FL

Champion: California North
Women's MVP: Jen Lalor (California North)

== U.S. Soccer Festival ==
The tournament took place at the National Sports Center in Blaine, MN from August 4–9.

Men's Tournament

August 4, 1997

U.S. U–18	2-1	West

Blaine, MN
August 4, 1997

US World University	5-0	South

Blaine, MN
August 5, 1997

US World University	2-1	Midwest
Brian West; Josh Wolff		Gino Diguardi

Blaine, MN
August 5, 1997

East	4-1	West
2' Chris Jones; Shane Dougherty; Matt Leonard; Tom Greaser		Chris Brown

Blaine, MN
August 6, 1997

Midwest	5-3	South

Blaine, MN
August 6, 1997

U.S. U–18	1-1	East

Blaine, MN
August 7, 1997

South	2-1	U.S. U–18

Blaine, MN
August 7, 1997

US World University	1-0	West

Blaine, MN
August 8, 1997

East	1-1	Midwest

Blaine, MN

Fifth place

August 9, 1997

West	3-2	South

Blaine, MN

Third place

August 9, 1997

U.S. U–18	1-0	Midwest

Blaine, MN

Final

August 9, 1997

East	1-0	US World University
Ross Paulie; Gary Gilmore		Andrew Gregor

Blaine, MN

Champions: USASA Region I East

Women's Tournament

August 5, 1997

United States	2-0	East
66' Michelle Akers; Jena Kluegel

Blaine, MN
August 5, 1997

U.S. U–17	3-0	West
Alyson Wagner; Kelly Rheem; Abby Wambach

Blaine, MN
August 5, 1997

Midwest	2-0	South

Blaine, MN
August 6, 1997

U.S. U–17	4-2	South

Blaine, MN
August 6, 1997

West	1-0	East

Blaine, MN
August 6, 1997

United States	6-0	Midwest

Blaine, MN
August 8, 1997

South	3-2	East

Blaine, MN
August 8, 1997

Midwest	2-1	West

Blaine, MN
August 8, 1997

United States	8-2	U.S. U–17
Brandi Chastain (4)

Blaine, MN

Champions: United States Women's National Team
Roster: Goalkeepers— Tracy Ducar, Briana Scurry; Defenders— Brandi Chastain, Joy Fawcett, Holly Manthei, Christie Pearce, Thori Staples, Sara Whalen; Midfielders— Bryn Blalack, Kristi Devert, Julie Foudy, Jena Kluegal Kristine Lilly, Tisha Venturini; Strikers— Michelle Akers, Kristine Keely, Mia Hamm, Angela Hucles.

== See also ==
1997 U.S. Open Cup
