= 1999 National Amateur Cup =

Soccer tournament

Following are the results of the 1999 National Amateur Cup, the annual amateur cup held by the United States Adult Soccer Association.

== Semifinals ==
July 16, 1999
5:00PM

United German Hungarian	3-2	McCormick Kickers

St. Louis, MO
July 16, 1999
3:00PM

Southfield Arsenal	3-2	Santa Clara Sporting

St. Louis, MO

== Final ==
July 18, 1999
1:00PM

Southfield Arsenal	7-5	United German Hungarian
91' Ben Craft; 100' Daniel Savich; 106' Joe DiMaggio		90'+5

St. Louis, MO

Champions: Southfield Arsenal
Staff: Nadhir Zoma (Manager), Waad Sana (Head coach), Raad Sana (Assistant coach)
Captain: Kevin Messing
Roster: Scot. Babinski, John Benoist, Ben Craft, Nate Craft, Chris Crawford, Joe DiMaggio, Sam Giullette, Rodrigo Gonzalez, Matt Kessler, Tim Lieckfelt, Dave Matovski, Chris Messing, Brandon Podolski, Steve Saborio, Daniel Savich, Adam Schokora, Jeff Shuk, Brett Woleben.

=== Men's Over 30 ===
June 1999

Budweiser Flyers	2-1	Via Systems

Mercer County Park, Trenton, NJ
Attendance: 400

Semifinals

July 16, 1999
2:00PM

Micro Standards	2-0	Budweiser Flyers

St. Louis, MO
July 16, 1999

Radnor SC	3-1	Texas Comets

St. Louis, MO

Final

July 18, 1999
9:00AM

Micro Standards	3-0	Radnor SC

St. Louis, MO

=== Men's Under 23 ===
Semifinals

July 16, 1999
1:30PM

Arsenal	2-1	Charles River United

St. Louis, MO
July 16, 1999
11:30AM

Scott Gallagher	3-1	Colorado Rush Nike

St. Louis, MO

Final

July 18, 1999
11:00AM

Scott Gallagher	5-0	Arsenal

St. Louis, MO

=== Men's Under 20 ===
Semifinals

July 16, 1999
1:30PM

DSA Strikers	2-1	Philadelphia Express

St. Louis, MO
July 16, 1999
11:30AM

Busch	4-1	San Jose International

St. Louis, MO

Final

July 18, 1999
9:00AM

Busch	1-0	DSA Strikers

St. Louis, MO

=== Women's Open ===
June 1999

San Diego Auto Trader	W-L	SoCal Blues

Final

July 18, 1999
2:00 PM

San Diego Auto Trader	14-0	Patrick Real Wyckoff

St. Louis, MO

=== Women's Amateur ===
Semifinals

July 16, 1999
3:00PM

Colorado Rush	5-2	Michigan Hawks

St. Louis, MO
July 16, 1999
5:00PM

Texas Kicks	0-8	Soccer Academy United

St. Louis, MO

Final

July 18, 1999
11:00

Colorado Rush	2-0	Soccer Academy United

St. Louis, MO

=== Women's Over–30 ===
Semifinals

July 16, 1999
3:00PM

Zenith Bohemian	6-1	J.B. Marine

St. Louis, MO
July 16, 1999
5:00PM

Austin Allies	4-2	Total Sports Pavilion

St. Louis, MO

Final

July 18, 1999
1:00PM

Zenith Bohemians	4-0	Austin Allies

=== Women's Under 23 ===
Semifinals

July 16, 1999
11:00AM

Colorado Rush Nike	4-1	Michigan Hawks

St. Louis, MO
July 16, 1999
1:00PM

Tampa Bay Heather	2-3	PDA Splash

St. Louis, MO

Final

July 18, 1999
11:00AM

Colorado Rush Nike	3-2	PDA Splash

St. Louis, MO

=== Women's Under 20 ===
Semifinals

July 16, 1999

Colorado Rush Nike	5-2	Buffalo Grove Cobras

St. Louis, MO
July 16, 1999

BFC Energizers	2-1	Texas United

St. Louis, MO

Final

July 18, 1999
9:00AM

Colorado Rush Nike	3-0	BFC Energizers

St. Louis, MO

== Veteran's Cup ==
The Veteran's Cup took place from July 2–4 in Bellingham, WA.

Men’s Over 40 Premier
Champion: Scotland Yard (Florida)

Men’s Over 50
Champions: Austin Wanderers (Texas South)

Women’s Over 40
Las Margaritas 8–0 Texas
Las Margaritas 3–2 Virginia
Las Margaritas 8–1 Oregon 1
Las Margaritas 2–0 Oregon 2

Champions: Las Margaritas (Seattle, WA)

Women’s Over 50
Champions: Emerald City Slicker (Washington)

== Coed Cup ==
The Coed Cup took place at the Sportsplex soccer fields in League City, TX.

Open Division
Champion: Mall Rats (Metro DC/Virginia)

Over 30 Division
Champion: Plaza Delphinus (Texas South)

== Open Cup Qualifying ==
=== Quarterfinals ===
May 23, 1999

Olympia Stamford	0-6	United German-Hungarians

May 23, 1999

Bavarian Leinenkugel	2-1	PNA

May 31, 1999

Los Lobos	4-2	McAllen Sun Devils

Montgomery, AL
May 23, 1999

Atotonilco	1-2	Mexico SC

Pomona, CA

=== Semifinals ===
July 16, 1999
9:00AM

Bavarian Leinenkugel	4-1	Mexico SC
10', 39' Scott Kreitmeir; 28' Craig Posselt; 65' Richard Cartledge		74' Manuel Hernandez (pk)

St. Louis, MO
July 16, 1999
9:00AM

United German Hungarian	7-2	Los Lobos

St. Louis, MO

=== Final ===
July 17, 1999
3:00PM

United German Hungarian	2-1	Bavarian Leinenkuge
10' Pat Morris; 42' Ray DeStephanis		65' Jamie Eichmann

St. Louis, MO

== George F. Donnelly Cup ==
Tournament took place from November 26–28 at Nova Southeastern University in Ft. Lauderdale, FL. The following state select teams were represented:
Men– (Region I) Connecticut, (Region II) Nebraska, (Region III) Tennessee, (Region IV) Washington.
Women– (Region I) Metropolitan D.C.–Virginia, (Region II) Minnesota, (Region III) Florida, (Region IV) Utah.

Men's Tournament

November 26, 1999
4:30PM

Connecticut	2-3	Nebraska
Luis Perez; Paul Wright

Ft. Lauderdale, FL
November 26, 1999
6:30PM

Washington	1-2	Tennessee

Ft. Lauderdale, FL
November 27, 1999
12:00PM

Washington	2-3	Connecticut
Renwick Hutson; Luis Perez; Bogdan Lonevsky

Ft. Lauderdale, FL
November 27, 1999
12:00PM

Tennessee	4-2	Nebraska

Ft. Lauderdale, FL
November 28, 1999
11:00AM

Connecticut	4-2	Tennessee
Renwick Hutson (2); Bogdan Lonevsky; Tony Cartiera

Ft. Lauderdale, FL
November 28, 1999
11:00AM

Nebraska	-	Washington

Ft. Lauderdale, FL

Champion: Connecticut Select
Staff: Boris Medvedev (Coach), Alberto Lopez (Assistant), Chris Lopez (Trainer)
Roster: Tony Cartiera, Kyle Fletcher, Bill Gatti, Renwick Hutson, Davis Koval, Bohdan Lonevsky, Alberto Lopez Jr., Antonio Lopez, Hector Navarrate, Peter Nunes, Richard Palmer, Rocco Santangello, Lee Sharkee, Tomas Voznica, Paul Wright, Gary Zucker, Alan Zuniga.

Women's Tournament

November 26, 1999
4:30PM

Utah	1-0	Florida

Ft. Lauderdale, FL
November 26, 1999
6:30PM

Minnesota	-	Metro D.C.–Virginia

Ft. Lauderdale, FL
November 27, 1999
10:00AM

Florida	6-1	Minnesota
Andrea Sellers (2)

Ft. Lauderdale, FL
November 27, 1999
10:00AM

Metro D.C.–Virginia	0-1	Utah
		PK

Ft. Lauderdale, FL
November 29, 1999
9:00AM

Metro D.C.–Virginia	1-3	Florida
		Andrea Sellers (2); Ginger Sellick

Ft. Lauderdale, FL
November 29, 1999
9:00AM

Minnesota	0-6	Utah

Ft. Lauderdale, FL

MVP: Mary Flaherty (Florida)
Champion: Utah Select

== U.S. Soccer Festival ==
The tournament took place at the Tualatin Hills Park and Recreational Center in Beaverton, OR from August 2–8.

Men's Tournament

August 2, 1999

U.S. U–18	2-0	West

Portland, OR
August 2, 1999

U.S. U–17	2-1	Midwest

Portland, OR
August 2, 1999

East	2-1	Oregon Select

Portland, OR
August 2, 1999

South	4-0	U.S. U–18

Portland, OR
August 4, 1999

Midwest	4-1	Oregon Select

Portland, OR
August 4, 1999

West	2-1	Canada U–18
		Murat Sukru

Portland, OR
August 4, 1999

South	3-0	U.S. U–18

Portland, OR
August 4, 1999

East	1-1	U.S. U–17

Portland, OR
August 6, 1999

Oregon Select	2-1	U.S. U–17

Portland, OR
August 6, 1999

West	6-0	West

Portland, OR
August 6, 1999

East	4-2	Midwest

Portland, OR
August 6, 1999

U.S. U–18	0-0	Canada U–18

Portland, OR
August 7, 1999

U.S. U–18	4-0	Oregon Select
Kyle Martino (pk)

Portland, OR
August 7, 1999

U.S. U–17	3-1	Canada U–18
		22'

Portland, OR

Third place

August 7, 1999

Midwest	6-5	South

Portland, OR

Final

August 7, 1999

East	3-2	West

Portland, OR

Women's Tournament

August 2, 1999

U.S. U–16	1-1	East

Portland, OR
August 2, 1999

West	4-1	South

Portland, OR
August 2, 1999

California Storm	4-1	Midwest

Portland, OR
August 4, 1999

West	1-0	East

Portland, OR
August 4, 1999

California Storm	0-0	South

Portland, OR
August 4, 1999

Midwest	2-1	U.S. U–16

Portland, OR
August 6, 1999

South	3-1	Midwest

Portland, OR
August 6, 1999

California Storm	3-2	East

Portland, OR
August 6, 1999

West	3-1	U.S. U–16
		50' Leslie Osborne

Portland, OR
August 7, 1999

California Storm	2-0	U.S. U–16

Portland, OR

Third place

August 7, 1999

Midwest	4-2	East

Portland, OR

Final

August 7, 1999

South	3-2	West

Portland, OR

== See also ==
1999 U.S. Open Cup
