= 2001 National Amateur Cup =

Soccer tournament

Following are the results of the 2001 National Amateur Cup, the annual amateur cup held by the United States Adult Soccer Association.

== Quarterfinals ==
June 17, 2001
1:00PM

| SC Baltimore Stars | 2-4 | Boston Olympiakos |
|---|---|---|
| 40' Kaiser Chowdhry (pk); 75' | | 82', 88' |

Horsham, PA
June 17, 2001

| Minnesota Inferno | 0-1 | Milwaukee Bavarians |

Blaine, MN
May 27, 2001

| Triangle Wellspring | W-L |

Tulsa, OK
June 3, 2001
1:00PM

| Santa Clara Sporting | W-L |

Salt Lake City, UT

== Semifinals ==
July 13, 2001
4:30PM

| Boston Olympiakos | 2-5 | Santa Clara Sporting |

Orlando, FL
July 13, 2001
7:00PM

| Milwaukee Bavarians | 5-2 | Triangle Wellspring |
|---|---|---|
| Dan Stebbins; Kris Kelderman (2); Marshall Morehead |

Orlando, FL

== Final ==
July 15, 2001
11:00AM

| Milwaukee Bavarian | 3-2 | Santa Clara Sporting |
|---|---|---|
| 21' Dominic DaPra; 29' Dan Stebbins; 40' Scott Kreitmeir | | 5', 12' |

Orlando, FL

MVP: Matt Schmidt GK (Bavarians)
Champions: Milwaukee Bavarian
Coach: Tom Zaiss
Roster: Kris Kelderman, Scott Kreitmeir, Giovanni Luna, Adam Pearson, Kevin Kusnick, Delroy Perrin, Jamie Eichmann, Bill Hambrook, Dan Stebbins, Dominic DaPra, Jon Szczepanski, Peter Schweinert, Rob Pearson, Nick Igel, Richard Cartledge, Marshall Morehead, Craig Posselt, Dean Beck, Jim Klopp, Matt Schmidt, Troy Troskey, Jon Coleman.

=== Men's Over 30 ===
Champions: Lake City Hawks (Mercer Island, WA)

=== Men's Under 23 ===
Final

July 15, 2001

| Northern United | 2-1 | Brito Produce |
|---|---|---|
| Adam Acosta; George Grygar |

Orlando, FL

MVP: Adam Acosta
Champions: Northern United (Sandy, UT)

=== Men's Under 20 ===
Semifinal

July 13, 2001

| Busch | 3-1 | North Texas Comets |
|---|---|---|
| Pat Noonan (2); Jason Cole |

Orlando, FL

Final

July 15, 2001

| Busch | 3-1 | Match Fit Academy |
|---|---|---|
| Jackie Jewsbury; Mike Tranchilla (2) |

Orlando, FL

MVP: Mike Tranchilla (Busch)
Champions: Busch (St. Louis, MO)

=== Women's Open ===
July 13, 2001

| SoCal Blues | W-L |

Orlando, FL
June 13, 2001

| Detroit Rocker Hawks | W-L |

Orlando, FL

Final

July 15, 2001

| SoCal Blues | 0-1 | Detroit Rocker Hawks |

Orlando, FL

=== Women's Amateur ===
Semifinals

July 13, 2001

| J.B. Marine | 4-0 | Ipswich |
|---|---|---|
| Laura Kram; Missy Peabody; Amy Schmidt; Kathleen Schafer |

Orlando, FL
July 13, 2001

| Hibernian Caledonian | W-L |

Orlando, FL

Final

July 15, 2001

| J.B. Marine | 2-1 | Hibernian Caledonian |
|---|---|---|
| 27’ Laura Kram; Missy Peabody |

Orlando, FL

MVP: Laura Kram (J.B. Marine)
Champions: Jefferson Barracks Marine (St. Louis, MO)

=== Women's Over 30 ===
Semifinal

July 13, 2001

| Texas United | - | J.B. Marine |

Orlando, FL

Final

July 15, 2001

| Zenith Bohemian | W-L |

Orlando, FL

Champions: Zenith Bohemians (Seattle)

=== Women's Under 23 ===
Semifinal

July 13, 2001

| Club Ohio | L-W | North Texas Sting |

Orlando, FL

Final

July 15, 2001

| PDA Galaxy | 1-0 | North Texas Sting |

Orlando, FL

=== Women's Under 20 ===
Semifinals

July 13, 2001
9:00AM

| F.C. Milwaukee Nationals | 2-1 | North Texas Sting |
|---|---|---|
| 20', 72' Laura Culhane | | 65' |

Orlando, FL
July 13, 2001

| Colorado Girls Club | 4-0 | PDA United Counties |

Orlando, FL

Final

July 15, 2001
9:00AM

| F.C. Milwaukee Nationals | 2-1 | Colorado Girls Club |
|---|---|---|
| 20’ Leslie Osborne |

Orlando, FL

Champions: F.C. Milwaukee Nationals
Coach: Tony Wright
Roster: Betz, Culhane, Gordon, Hatch, Klopp, Krofta, Kubacki, Osborne, Schmidt, Suminski, Taylor, Walter.

== Veterans Cup ==
The Veteran's Cup took place from June 21–24 at the YMCA Soccer Complex in Beckley, WV.

Men's Over 40 Premier
Semifinals

June 23, 2001
5:00PM

| Scotland Yard | 2-1 | Beadling |

Beckley, WV
June 23, 2001
5:00PM

| Palm Beach | 1-0 | Olympiakos AC |

Beckley, WV

Final

June 24, 2001

| Scotland Yard | 2-1 | Palm Beach |
|---|---|---|
| 47' George Clamp; 60' Kevin McCarron | | Rick Christensen |

Beckley, WV

Men's Over 50
Semifinals

June 23, 2001
5:00PM

| Texas Wanderers | 2-0 | PA W. Premier |

Beckley, WV
June 23, 2001
5:00PM

| Chaldean Arsenal | 3-2 | Neoth |

Beckley, WV

Final

June 24, 2001

| Texas Wanderers | 5-0 | Chaldean Arsenal |
|---|---|---|
| Zequinha (3) |

Beckley, WV

Women's Over 40
Semifinals

June 23, 2001
5:00PM

| Camp Spring | 3-0 | Fighting Pine Cones |

Beckley, WV
June 23, 2001
5:00PM

| Copa Di Vida | 2-1 | He Kini Popo |
|---|---|---|
| 49' Janet Charnley |

Beckley, WV

Final

June 24, 2001

| Copa Di Vida | 1-0 | Camp Springs |
|---|---|---|
| 49' Janet Charnley |

Beckley, WV

Women's Over 50
Semifinals

June 23, 2001
5:00PM

| Evergreen Steelers | 2-0 | Georgia Flash |

Beckley, WV
June 23, 2001
5:00PM

| Virginia Vintage | 1-0 | Cambridge |

Beckley, WV

Final

June 24, 2001

| Virginia Vintage | 0-2 | Evergreen Steelers |
|---|---|---|
| | | 1' Joyce Trader; Maj Surowieck |

Beckley, WV

== Coed Cup ==
The Coed Cup took place from September 28–30 at Russell Creek Park in Plano, TX.

Open Division
Group scores:
Fados Irish Pub Conquistadores 2–1 TNT–WSA
Fados Irish Pub Conquistadores 4–3 North Texas Shooters
Fados Irish Pub Conquistadores 3–2 Killer Ducks
Fados Irish Pub Conquistadores 1–1 Houston Challengers

Semifinals
Fados Irish Pub Conquistadores 2–0 (OT) Ann Arbor United
Serrano's Salsa Co. 2–0 Mall Rats

Final
Fados Irish Pub Conquistadores 2–1 Serrano's Salsa Co.

Champion: Fados Irish Pub Conquistadores (Metro DC/Virginia)

Over 30 Division
Group scores:
Hot Pink Panthers 0–2 Express
Hot Pink Panthers 1–1 Olympia
Hot Pink Panthers 7–0 Blackhawk
Hot Pink Panthers 2–0 Killer Ducks

Final
Hot Pink Panthers 1–0 Express

Champion: Hot Pink Panthers (Metro DC/Virginia)

== Open Cup Qualifying ==
=== Quarterfinals ===
June 2, 2001

| Olympia Stamford | 4-1 | ZPA Perth Amboy |
|---|---|---|
| Roland Demba (2); David Siljanowski (2) | | 2H' pk |

Baltimore, MD
May 30, 2001
6:30PM

| Chaldean Arsenal | 3-2 | Chicago Adria |

Southfield, MI
May 27, 2001

| Uruguay SC | 3-0 | McAllen Vikingos |

Tulsa, OK
June 3, 2001

| Mexico SC | 2-1 | San Francisco Glens |
|---|---|---|
| Edgardo Contreras (2) |

Salt Lake City, UT

=== Semifinals ===
Olympia Stamford was disqualified for use of ineligible players. Mexico SC advanced to the final.

July 13, 2001
11:00AM

| Chaldean Arsenal | 0-3 | Uruguay SC |

Orlando, FL
July 13, 2001
11:00AM

| Olympia Stamford | 3-2 | Mexico SC |

Orlando, FL

=== Final ===
July 14, 2001
5:30PM

| Uruguay SC | 3-0 | Mexico SC |
|---|---|---|
| 55' Pablo Gentile; 68', 80' Pablo Dos Santos |

Orlando, FL

Champions: Uruguay SC
Staff: Gerry Schiavo, Jeena O'Sant Gee, Leonardo Tonna, Carlos Pasos
Captain: Gustavo Britos
Roster: Gustavo Aragoasa, Ulises Gonzalez, Alejandro Valle, Andres Peralta, Serge Jeoseph, Alejandro Gorosito, Andres Polonsky, Pablo Gentile, Juan Yalet, Alejandro Romairone, Pablo Dos Santos, Julio Barrios, Sebastian Zurita.

== George F. Donnelly Cup ==
The tournament took place from November 23–25 in Fort Lauderdale, FL.

Men's Tournament
Connecticut 1–0 Minnesota
Connecticut 4–2 Washington
Connecticut 5–3 North Texas

MVP: Richard Palmer (Connecticut)
Champion: Connecticut Select (Region I)
Staff: Boris Medvedev (coach), Alberto Lopez (manager)
Roster: Paul Brooks, Mike Butler, Tony Cartiera, T.J. DeLucia, Jose Dias, Kevin Gonzales, Vincent Kwarula, Bohdan Lonevskiy, Samuel Lopes, Alberto Lopez Jr., Antonio Lopez, Everson Maciel, Fernando Nogareda, Rodrigo Nunes, Pedro Oliveira, Richard Palmer, Maurizio Rocha, Roberto Vargas, Nick Venditti, Alex Zunniga.

Women's Tournament
Champion: Massachusetts Select (Region I)

== U.S. Soccer Festival ==
The U.S. Soccer Festival took place at Trinity Christian College in Palos Heights, IL, and Moraine Valley Community College in Palos Hills, IL from July 29 – August 4.

Men's Tournament

July 29, 2001
2:30PM

| UNAM U–20 | 1-0 | Midwest |

Chicago, IL
July 29, 2001
2:30PM

| U.S. U–18 | 1-4 | East |

Chicago, IL
July 29, 2001
4:30PM

| West | 1-1 | Illinois Select |

Chicago, IL
July 29, 2001
4:30PM

| South | 2-1 | U.S. U–17 |
|---|---|---|
| 2H' (2) | | Justin Mapp |

Chicago, IL
July 31, 2001
6:00PM

| South | 4-1 | UNAM U–20 |

Chicago, IL
July 31, 2001
6:00PM

| Midwest | 1-1 | U.S. U–17 |
|---|---|---|
| 88' Matt Thomas | | 17' Eddie Johnson |

Chicago, IL
July 31, 2001
6:00PM

| East | 2-1 | Illinois Select |

Chicago, IL
July 31, 2001
8:00PM

| U.S. U–18 | 0-3 | West |
|---|---|---|
| | | 35' |

Chicago, IL
August 2, 2001
6:00PM

| West | 2-1 | East |

Chicago, IL
August 2, 2001
6:00PM

| South | 2-1 | Midwest |

Chicago, IL
August 2, 2001
6:00PM

| U.S. U–18 | 8-0 | Illinois Select |
|---|---|---|
| 10', 29' Cameron; Michael Enfield; Ryan Alexander; 65' Joe Vide (pk); Ned Grabavoy; 67' Brett Weisner; 72' Joe Vide |

Chicago, IL
August 2, 2001
8:00PM

| UNAM U–20 | 2-2 | U.S. U–17 |
|---|---|---|
| 1' | | 50', 71' Erwin Diaz |

Chicago, IL
August 3, 2001
4:00PM

| Illinois Select | - | U.S. U–17 |

Chicago, IL

Third place

August 3, 2001
4:00PM

| Midwest | 2-1 | East |

Chicago, IL

Exhibition

August 3, 2001
6:00PM

| U.S. U–18 | 2-1 | UNAM U–20 |
|---|---|---|
| 78' Andre Schmid; 83' Brett Wiesner | | 49' |

Chicago, IL

Final

August 3, 2001
8:00PM

| South | 0-3 | West |

Chicago, IL

Champions: West (Region IV)

Women's Tournament

July 30, 2001
6:00PM

| West | 2-2 | Midwest |

Chicago, IL
July 30, 2001
6:00PM

| East | 0-0 | U.S. U–16 |

Chicago, IL
July 30, 2001
8:00PM

| Mexico U–18 | 4-2 | South |

Chicago, IL
August 1, 2001
6:00PM

| Midwest | 2-4 | Mexico U–18 |

Chicago, IL
August 1, 2001
6:15PM

| South | 0-1 | East |

Chicago, IL
August 1, 2001
8:00PM

| West | 1-5 | U.S. U–16 |
|---|---|---|
| | | Stacey Lindstrom; Adele Letro (2); Christina Estrada; Angela Woznuk |

Chicago, IL
August 3, 2001
4:00PM

| Mexico U–18 | 0-3 | U.S. U–16 |
|---|---|---|
| | | 47', 63' Christina Estrada (2); 59' Angela Woznuk |

Chicago, IL
August 3, 2001
:00PM

| West | 4-1 | East |

Chicago, IL
August 3, 2001
6:00PM

| South | 4-1 | Midwest |

Chicago, IL

Third place

August 4, 2001
2:00PM

| East | 3-0 | Midwest |

Chicago, IL

Final

August 4, 2001
4:00PM

| South | 2-2 | West |
|---|---|---|
| | | Temryss Lane (2) |

Chicago, IL

Champions: South (Region II) won by PKs

== See also ==
2001 U.S. Open Cup
