= National Amateur Cup =

American soccer competition

- Original amateur cup trophy
- Organizer(s): USASA
- Founded: 1922; 104 years ago
- Region: United States
- Teams: 16
- Qualifier for: U.S. Open Cup
- Current champion(s): El Farolito SC (2026) (1st title)
- Most championships: St. Louis Kutis; Milwaukee Bavarian SC (7 titles)
- Website: usasa.com/cup
- 2026

The National Amateur Cup, also known as the USASA Amateur Cup, is an American knockout soccer competition open to all amateur teams affiliated with the United States Soccer Federation through United States Adult Soccer Association (USASA). The National Amateur Cup began in the 1922–23 season in response to the number of teams applying to play in the National Challenge Cup.

The winner of the men's National Amateur Cup tournament is awarded the Fritz Marth Cup and an entry into the U.S. Open Cup.

== History ==
In 1922, the United States Football Association established the National Amateur Cup in response to the growing number of teams entering the open National Challenge Cup. The 1922–23 competition was played through the semifinals; however, the tournament was never completed due to inclement weather. In the 1923–24 season Fleisher Yarn was crowned as the first amateur champion in the United States. St. Louis Kutis S.C. is the most successful amateur club having won the National Amateur Cup seven times.

While the USSF originally managed the competition, that responsibility is now held by the United States Adult Soccer Association (USASA).

== Format ==
The National Amateur Cup progresses from state competitions through regional competitions, resulting in national tournament.

Starting with the 2019 U.S. Open Cup, the winner of the previous year's National Amateur Cup qualifies for the U.S. Open Cup tournament proper, bypassing the local qualification process.

== Champions ==
=== Men's finals ===
Key

- (a.e.t.) – Match went to extra time
- (p) – Match decided by a penalty shoot-out after extra time

Ed.	Year	Winner	Score	Runner-up	Ref.
–	1923	(Finals not held)			
1	1924	Fleisher Yarn (1)	3–0	Chicago Swedish-Americans	
2	1925	Toledo S.C. (1)	3–1	Weekawken McLeod Council	
3	1926	New Bedford Defenders (1)	1–0	Pittsburgh Heidelberg SC	
4	1927	Pittsburgh Heidelberg SC (1)	3–0	New Bedford La Flamme Cobblers	
5	1928	Swedish Americans (1) (Note: Title shared.)	–	–	
5	1928	Fall River Powers Hudson Essex	–	–	
6	1929	Pittsburgh Heidelberg SC (2)	9–0	Newark First German SC	
7	1930	Fall River Rafferty (1) (Note: Title awarded to Fall River R after Pittsburgh forfeited.)	3–3	Pittsburgh Gallatin SC	
8	1931	Akron Goodyear (1)	1–1	New Bedford Black Cats	
8	1931	Akron Goodyear (1)	2–0 (Note: Tie breaker match.)	New Bedford Black Cats	
9	1932	Cleveland Shamrocks (1)	2–1	New Bedford Santo Cristo	
10	1933	Philadelphia German-Americans (1)	5–1	Pittsburgh McKnight Beverage	
11	1934	Philadelphia German-Americans (2)	2–1	Pittsburgh Heidelberg SC	
12	1935	W. W. Riehl SC (1)	3–0	Fall River All-Americans	
13	1936	Brooklyn DSC Germans (1)	2–0	Pittsburgh Castle Shannon	
14	1937	Trenton Highlander (1)	1–0	Pittsburgh Castle Shannon	
15	1938	Fall River Ponta Delgada (1)	2–1	Pittsburgh Heidelberg SC	
16	1939	Fall River St. Michael's (1)	3–1	Pittsburgh Gallatin S.C.	
17	1940	Morgan Strasser (1)	1–0	Fall River Firestone	
18	1941	Fall River S.C. (1)	2–1	Detroit Chrysler S.C.	
19	1942	Fall River S.C. (2)	4–0	Morgan Strasser	
20	1943	Morgan Strasser (1)	4–1	Baltimore Santa Maria S.C.	
21	1944	S.C. Eintracht (1)	5–2	Morgan Strasser	
22	1945	S.C. Eintracht (2)	1–0	Raferty's	
23	1946	Fall River Ponta Delgada (2)	5–2	Pittsburgh Castle Shannon	
24	1947	Fall River Ponta Delgada (3)	10–1	St. Louis Carondelets	
25	1948	Fall River Ponta Delgada (4)	4–1	Pittsburgh Curry Vets	
26	1949	Elizabeth S.C. (1)	6–?	Zenthoefer Furs	
27	1950	Fall River Ponta Delgada (5)	0–1	Pittsburgh Harmarville	
27	1950	Fall River Ponta Delgada (5)	4–1	Pittsburgh Harmarville	
28	1951	German-Hungarian S.C. (1)	4–3	Pittsburgh Harmarville	
29	1952	St. Louis Raiders (1)	3–1	Ludlow Lusitano	
30	1953	Fall River Ponta Delgada (6)	2–0	Chicago Slovaks	
31	1954	Pittsburgh Beadling (1)	2–5	St. Louis Simpkins-Ford	
31	1954	Pittsburgh Beadling (1)	5–1	St. Louis Simpkins-Ford	
32	1955	Pittsburgh Heidelberg Tornados (1)	2–2	A.A.C. Eagles	
32	1955	Pittsburgh Heidelberg Tornados (1)	5–0	A.A.C. Eagles	
33	1956	St. Louis Kutis (1)	1–0	Philadelphia Ukrainians	
34	1957	St. Louis Kutis (2)	2–0	Rochester Ukrainian	
35	1958	St. Louis Kutis (3)	2–1	Pittsburgh Beadling	
36	1959	St. Louis Kutis (4)	5–0	Detroit St. Andrew Scots	
36	1959	St. Louis Kutis (4)	2–2	Detroit St. Andrew Scots	
37	1960	St. Louis Kutis (5)	4–0	Patchogue S.C.	
38	1961	St. Louis Kutis (6)	11–3	Italian-American Stars A.C.	
38	1961	St. Louis Kutis (6)	3–3	Italian-American Stars A.C.	
39	1962	Detroit Carpathia (1)	4–0	New Brunswick American Hungarian	
40	1963	Rochester Italian-American (1)	1–0	St. Louis St. Ambrose	
41	1964	Chicago Schwaben (1)	4–0	Philadelphia United German-Hungarians	
42	1965	Philadelphia United German-Hungarians (1)	6–0	St. Louis St. Ambrose	
43	1966	Chicago Kickers (1)	5–2	Rochester Italian Americans	
44	1967	Italian-American Stars A.C. (1)	2–0	St. Louis Kutis	
45	1968	Chicago Kickers (2)	2–1	Detroit Carpathia Kickers	
46	1969	Washington British Lions (1)	4–1	St. Louis Kutis	
47	1970	Chicago Kickers (3)	6–5	Philadelphia United German-Hungarians	
48	1971	St. Louis Kutis (7)	4–1	Cleveland Inter-Italians	
49	1972	St. Louis Busch S.C. (1)	1–0	Portuguese American Athletic Club (New Bedford)	
50	1973	Philadelphia Inter (1)	3–2	San Jose Grenadiers	
51	1974	Philadelphia Inter (2)	3–2	St. Louis Big Four Chevrolet S.C.	
52	1975	Milwaukee Bavarian (1)	3–0	Trenton S.C.	
53	1976	Milwaukee Bavarian (2)	3–1	Trenton S.C.	
54	1977	Denver Kickers (1)	3–1	Philadelphia United German-Hungarian	
55	1978	Denver Kickers (2)	8–3	Cleveland Inter-Italia	
56	1979	Atlanta Datagraphic (1)	1–0	San Francisco Glens	
57	1980	St. Louis Busch Bavarians (1)	3–2	Atlanta Datagraphic	
58	1981	St. Louis Busch Bavarians (2)	3–2	Philadelphia Bayern	
59	1982	Seattle Croatia (1)	1–0	Virginia Kicks	
60	1983	Denver Kickers (3)	2–1	Milwaukee Bavarian	
61	1984	Dallas Mean Green (1)	5–0	Detroit Ukrainian S.C.	
62	1985	Club España (1)	2–1	Washington F.C. Mitre Eagles	
63	1986	Fairfax Spartans (1)	3–0	St. Louis Busch	
64	1987	Polish American Eagles (1)	3–1	Atlanta Datagraphic	
65	1988	Dallas Mean Green (2)	1–0	Philadelphia Inter	
66	1989	A.A.C. Eagles (1)	2–0	Philadelphia Inter	
67	1990	St. Petersburg Kickers (1)	1–0	San Francisco Glens	
68	1991	St. Louis Scott Gallagher (1)	3–1	San Francisco El Farolito	
69	1992	Madison 56ers (1)	2–1	IFC Greensboro	
70	1993	Seattle Murphy's Pub (1)	2–1	St. Louis Scott Gallagher	
71	1994	Denver Kickers (4)	1–0	A.A.C. Eagles	
72	1995	Denver Kickers (5)	0–0 (Note: No playoff held, Denver was crowned champion.)	Team Lapine	
73	1996	Washington Iberia (1)	2–1	Dallas Speed	
74	1997	St. Petersburg McCormick Kickers (2)	4–0	Milwaukee Sport Club	
75	1998	Chicago Schwaben (1)	2–1	Los Angeles Cassal	
76	1999	Detroit Arsenal (1)	7–5	Philadelphia United German-Hungarians	
77	2000	Southfield Arsenal (1)	1–0	North Texas Legends	
78	2001	Milwaukee Bavarian (3)	3–2	Santa Clara Sporting Club	
79	2002	Milwaukee Bavarian (4)	3–1	Baltimore Colts	
80	2003	Milwaukee Bavarian (5)	3–1	St. Petersburg Kickers	
81	2004	Assyrian Winged Bull (1)	4–3	Denver Kickers	
82	2005	Washington Hibernian Saints (1)	2–1	Maryland Allied S.C.	
83	2006	Azzurri (1)	n/a	HNK Zirinski	
84	2007	Boston Olympiakos (1)	2–0	A.A.C. Eagles	
85	2008	Florida Kickers (3)	n/a	Baltimore Colts	
86	2009	Aegean Hawks (1)	n/a	A.A.C. Eagles	
87	2010	Boston Olympiakos (1)	n/a	Carpathia Kickers	
88	2011	RWB Adria (1)	n/a	PSA Elite	
89	2012	Battery Park Gunners (1)	n/a	RWB Adria	
90	2013	RWB Adria (2)	n/a	ASC New Stars	
91	2014	New York Greek Americans (1)	4–2	Guadalajara FC	
92	2015	Quinto Elemento FC (1)	n/a	Maryland Bays	
93	2016	Christos FC (1)	1–0	Milwaukee Bavarian	
94	2017	Lansdowne Boys (1)	2–2 (9–8 p)	Milwaukee Bavarian	
95	2018	Milwaukee Bavarian (6)	2–0	West Chester United SC	
96	2019	Newton Pride (1)	4–0	Horizon FC	
–	2020	(Cancelled due to the COVID-19 pandemic in the United States)			
97	2021	Lansdowne Yonkers (2)	2–1	Cal FC	
98	2022	Milwaukee Bavarian (7)	1–0	Northern Virginia FC	
99	2023	SC Mesoamerica (1)	2–1	Newtown Pride	
100	2024	New York Pancyprian-Freedoms (1)	6–0	FC Milwaukee Torrent	
101	2025	West Chester United (1)	4–3 (a.e.t.)	RWB Adria	
102	2026	El Farolito SC (1)	3–1 (a.e.t.)	Lansdowne Yonkers FC	

=== Women's finals ===
Year	Winner	Runner-up	Ref.
2004	Chicago Eclipse Select		
2005	Chicago Eclipse Select (2)		
2006	Chicago Eclipse Select (3)		
2007	New York Athletic Club		
2008	Turbo D'Feeters		
2013	ASA Chesapeake Charge		
2014	Olympic Club		
2021	Rockford Raptors	Sidekicks FC	
2022	Pan World Elite WFC		
2023	NTX Image	Rochester Lazers	
2024	Pan World Elite WFC (2)	Winger FC	
2025	Pan World Elite WFC (3)	Capital Pride	
2026	Rochester Lazers	Milwaukee Torrent	

== Performance ==
National Amateur Cup winners by teams
Team	Winners	Runners-up	Years won	Years runner-up
Milwaukee Bavarian SC	7	3	1975, 1976, 2001, 2002, 2003, 2018, 2022	1983, 2016, 2017
St. Louis Kutis S.C.	7	2	1956, 1957, 1958, 1959, 1960, 1961, 1971	1967, 1969
Fall River Ponta Delgada	6	0	1938, 1946, 1947, 1948, 1950, 1953	
Denver Kickers	5	1	1977, 1978, 1983, 1994, 1995	2004
Pittsburgh Heidelberg SC	2	3	1927, 1929	1926, 1934, 1938
A.A.C. Eagles	1	4	1989	1955, 1994, 2007, 2009
Chicago Kickers	4	0	1966, 1968, 1970, 1975	
Morgan Strasser	2	2	1940, 1943	1942, 1944
St. Louis Busch Bavarians	3	1	1972, 1980, 1981	1986
Philadelphia Inter	2	2	1973, 1974	1988, 1989
RWB Adria	2	2	2011, 2013	2012, 2025
Philadelphia German-Americans	2	0	1933, 1934	
Fall River S.C.	2	0	1941, 1942	
Atlanta Datagraphic	1	2	1979	1980, 1987
Philadelphia United German-Hungarians	1	4	1965	1964, 1970, 1977, 1999
Lansdowne Yonkers FC	2	0	2017, 2021	2026
Chicago Schwaben	2	0	1964, 1998	
S.C. Eintracht	2	0	1944, 1945	
Boston Olympiakos	2	0	2007, 2010	
Dallas Mean Green	2	0	1984, 1988	
Pittsburgh Castle Shannon	0	3		1936, 1937, 1946
Detroit Carpathia Kickers	1	2	1962	1968, 2010
Italian-American Stars A.C.	1	1	1967	1961
Newtown Pride FC	1	1	2019	2023
Pittsburgh Beadling	1	1	1954	1958
Rochester Italian-American	1	1	1963	1966
St. Louis Scott Gallagher	1	1	1991	1993
St. Petersburg Kickers	1	1	1990	2003
El Farolito SC	1	1	2026	1991
New York Pancyprian-Freedoms	1	0	2024	
West Chester United SC (USLPA)	1	1	2025	2018
Baltimore Colts	0	2		2002, 2008
Cleveland Inter-Italians	0	2		1971, 1978
Pittsburgh Harmarville	0	2		1950, 1951
San Francisco Glens	0	2		1979, 1990
St. Louis St. Ambrose	0	2		1963, 1965
Fleisher Yarn	1	0	1924	
Chicago Swedish–Americans	0	1		1924
Toledo S.C.	1	0	1925	
Weekawken McLeod Council	0	1		1925
New Bedford Defenders	1	0	1926	
New Bedford La Flamme Cobblers	1	0	1927	
Swedish Americans	1	0	1928	
Fall River Powers Hudson Essex	1	0	1928	
Newark First German SC	0	1		1929
Fall River Rafferty	1	1	1930	1945
Pittsburgh Gallatin SC	0	2		1930, 1939
Akron Goodyear	1	0	1931	
New Bedford Black Cats	0	1		1931
Cleveland Shamrocks	1	0	1932	
New Bedford Santo Cristo	0	1		1932
Pittsburgh McKnight Beverage	0	1		1933
W. W. Riehl SC	1	0	1935	
Fall River All-Americans	0	1		1935
Brooklyn DSC Germans	1	0	1936	
Trenton Highlander	1	0	1937	
Fall River St. Michael's	1	0	1939	
Fall River Firestone	0	1		1940
Detroit Chrysler S.C.	0	1		1941
Baltimore Santa Maria S.C.	0	1		1943
St. Louis Carondelets	0	1		1947
Pittsburgh Curry Vets	0	1		1948
Elizabeth S.C.	1	0	1949	
Zenthoefer Furs	0	1		1949
German-Hungarian S.C.	1	0	1951	
St. Louis Raiders	1	0	1952	
Ludlow Lusitano	0	1		1952
Chicago Slovaks	0	1		1953
St. Louis Simpkins-Ford	0	1		1954
Pittsburgh Heidelberg Tornados	1	0	1955	
Philadelphia Ukrainians	0	1		1956
Rochester Ukrainian	0	1		1957
Detroit St. Andrew Scots	0	1		1959
Patchogue S.C.	0	1		1960
Italian-American Stars A.C.	1	1	1967	1961
New Brunswick American Hungarian	0	1		1962
Washington British Lions	1	0	1969	
Portuguese American Athletic Club (New Bedford)	0	1		1972
San Jose Grenadiers	0	1		1973
St. Louis Big Four Chevrolet S.C.	0	1		1974
Trenton S.C.	0	2		1975, 1976
Philadelphia Bayern	0	1		1981
Seattle Croatia	1	0	1982	
Virginia Kicks	0	1		1983
Detroit Ukrainian S.C.	0	1		1984
Club España	1	0	1985	
Washington F.C. Mitre Eagles	0	1		1985
Fairfax Spartans	1	0	1986	
Polish American Eagles	1	0	1987	
Madison 56ers	1	0	1992	
IFC Greensboro	0	1		1992
Seattle Murphy's Pub	1	0	1993	
Team Lapine	0	1		1995
Washington Iberia	1	0	1996	
Dallas Speed	0	1		1996
St. Petersburg McCormick Kickers	1	0	1997	
Milwaukee Sport Club	0	1		1997
Los Angeles Cassal	0	1		1998
Detroit Arsenal	1	0	1999	
North Texas Legends	0	1		2000
Southfield Arsenal	1	0	2000	
Santa Clara Sporting Club	0	1		2001
Assyrian Winged Bull	1	0	2004	
Maryland Allied S.C.	0	1		2005
Washington Hibernian Saints	1	0	2005	
HNK Zirinski	0	1		2006
Azzurri	1	0	2006	
Florida Kickers	1	0	2008	
Aegean Hawks	1	0	2009	
PSA Elite	0	1		2011
Battery Park Gunners	1	0	2012	
ASC New Stars	0	1		2013
New York Greek American SC	1	0	2014	
Guadalajara FC	0	1		2014
Quinto Elemento FC	1	0	2015	
Maryland Bays	0	1		2015
Christos FC	1	0	2016	
Horizon FC	0	1		2019
Cal FC	0	1		2021
Northern Virginia FC	0	1		2022
SC Mesoamerica	1	0	2023	
FC Milwaukee Torrent	0	1		2024
