= 2003 National Amateur Cup =

Soccer tournament

Following are the results of the 2003 National Amateur Cup, the annual amateur cup held by the United States Adult Soccer Association.

== Region I ==
Quarterfinals

May 2003

Phoenix Ultra	5-0	Greek–American Atlas

Horsham, PA
May 2003

Kearny Scots	2-1	Jerry D's
Jimmy Wandling (2)

Kearny, NJ

Rochester Italian–American	w/o	D.C.–Virginia

May 2003

Watertown United	2-1	El Michoacan

New York

Semifinals

June 2003

Phoenix Ultra	6-1	Watertown United

Horsham, PA
June 8, 2003
1:30PM

Kearny Scots	3-2	Rochester Italian–American
Chris Martinovic (2); Sebastien DiBello

Kearny, NJ

Final

June 15, 2003
12:30PM

Phoenix Ultra	1-2	Kearny Scots
		Jimmy Wandling; M. Orias

Horsham, PA

== Region II ==
Group A

June 27, 2003
7:00PM

Southern Ohio	2-1	Missouri

Farmington Hills, MI
June 27, 2003
7:00PM

Ohio North	1-7	Milwaukee Bavarian

Farmington Hills, MI
June 28, 2003
10:00AM

Ohio North	-	Southern Ohio

Farmington Hills, MI
June 28, 2003
10:00AM

Milwaukee Bavarian	-	Missouri

Farmington Hills, MI
June 28, 2003
4:00PM

Southern Ohio	-	Milwaukee Bavarian

Farmington Hills, MI
June 28, 2003
4:00PM

Missouri	-	Ohio North

Farmington Hills, MI

Group B

June 27, 2003
7:00PM

Indiana Invaders	0-2	Chaldean Arsenal
		Ryan McMahan; Chris Crawford

Farmington Hills, MI
June 27, 2003
7:00PM

Green White	1-2	Detroit United

Farmington Hills, MI
June 28, 2003
10:00AM

Green White	-	Indiana Invaders

Farmington Hills, MI
June 28, 2003
10:00AM

Detroit United	-	Chaldean Arsenal

Farmington Hills, MI
June 28, 2003
4:00PM

Indiana Invaders	-	Detroit United

Farmington Hills, MI
June 28, 2003
4:00PM

Chaldean Arsenal	-	Green White

Farmington Hills, MI

Final

June 29, 2003
11:30AM

Milwaukee Bavarian	3-2	Chaldean Arsenal
Nick Igel; Ryan Seymour; 62' Adam Riesz		Jordan Gruber; Ryan McMahen

Farmington Hills, MI

== Region III ==
The Region III tournament took place at the SportPlex in Gulfport, MS from May 23–26.

Group A

May 23, 2003
1:00PM

Saturn United	2-1	Iguana

Gulfport, MS
May 23, 2003
1:00PM

Legends	5-2	Estudiantes

Gulfport, MS
May 24, 2003
12:00PM

Legends	7-0	Saturn United

Gulfport, MS
May 24, 2003
12:00PM

Estudiantes	2-2	Iguana

Gulfport, MS
May 25, 2003
9:00AM

Iguana	0-2	Legends

Gulfport, MS
May 25, 2003
9:00AM

Saturn United	8-1	Estudiantes

Gulfport, MS

Group B

May 23, 2003
1:00PM

Olympiakos	2-1	Tulsa Rangers

Gulfport, MS
May 24, 2003
12:00PM

St. Petersburg Kickers	5-0	Olympiakos

Gulfport, MS
May 25, 2003
9:00AM

Tulsa Rangers	3-4	St. Petersburg Kickers

Gulfport, MS

Final

May 26, 2003
10:00AM

Legends	2-3	St. Petersburg Kickers

Gulfport, MS

== Region IV ==
The Region IV tournament took place in Albuquerque, NM from May 30–June 1.

Group A

May 30, 2003
3:00PM

Sonny's FC	3-5	Colorado Rocks

Albuquerque, NM
May 30, 2003
3:00PM

Utah	3-3	Soccer Center United

Albuquerque, NM
May 31, 2003
9:00AM

Soccer Center United	3-0	Sonny's FC

Albuquerque, NM
May 31, 2003
9:00AM

Colorado Rocks	2-2	Utah

Albuquerque, NM
May 31, 2003
3:00PM

Sonny's FC	0-5	Utah

Albuquerque, NM
May 31, 2003
3:00PM

Colorado Rocks	3-2	Soccer Center United

Albuquerque, NM

Group B

May 30, 2003
3:00PM

Caledonian Saints	6-0	Aguilas America

Albuquerque, NM
May 30, 2003
3:00PM

A–1 Pools	0-5	Santa Clara Sporting

Albuquerque, NM
May 31, 2003
9:00AM

Santa Clara Sporting	3-1	Caledonian Saints

Albuquerque, NM
May 31, 2003
9:00AM

Aguilas America	3-4	A–1 Pools

Albuquerque, NM
May 31, 2003
3:00PM

A–1 Pools	0-4	Caledonian Saints

Albuquerque, NM
May 31, 2003
3:00PM

Aguilas America	0-11	Santa Clara Sporting

Albuquerque, NM

Final

June 1, 2003
9:00AM

Hibernian Caledonian Saints	5-0	Colorado Rocks

Albuquerque, NM

== National Championship ==
Semifinals

July 18, 2003
7:00PM

Hibernian Caledonian Saints	2-3	St. Petersburg Kickers

Milwaukee, WI
July 18, 2003
7:00PM

Milwaukee Bavarians	3-2	Kearny Scots
86'; 116' Brian Doherty

Milwaukee, WI

Final

July 20, 2003
12:00PM

Milwaukee Bavarians	3-2	St. Petersburg Kickers
47', 90' Dan Stebbins; 60' Adam Riesz		24', 32' Clarke

Milwaukee, WI

== U.S. Open Cup Qualifying ==
=== Region I ===
Semifinal

May 11, 2003

Vistula Garfield	4-2	Greek American Atlas

May 11, 2003

Bridgeport Italians	W-L	Briar Red

Final

May 25, 2003
2:00PM

Bridgeport Italians	W-L	Vistula Garfield

Bridgeport, CT

=== Region II ===
Semifinal

April 27, 2003

AAC Eagles	3-2	FC Indiana

Chicago, IL

Final

May 18, 2003

AAC Eagles	0-1	Milwaukee Bavarians
		60' Adam Riesz

Gurnee, IL

=== Region III ===
Semifinal

May 24, 2003
3:00PM

Darby	0-4	DS United

Gulfport, MS

Final

May 25, 2003
3:00PM

DS United	4-0	Arsenal

Gulfport, MS

=== Region IV ===
Group A

May 30, 2003
3:00PM

NuLab	1-7	Banat Arsenal

Albuquerque, NM
May 31, 2003
9:00AM

Banat Arsenal	2-3	Chico Rooks

Albuquerque, NM
May 31, 2003
5:00PM

Chico Rooks	7-2	NuLab

Albuquerque, NM

Group B

May 30, 2003
3:00PM

Monarch	0-1	Tyneside United

Albuquerque, NM
May 31, 2003
9:00AM

Tyneside United	5-3	Brewmen

Albuquerque, NM
May 31, 2003
5:00PM

Brewmen	3-1	Monarch

Albuquerque, NM

Final

June 1, 2003
1:00PM

Tyneside United	2-3	Chico Rooks

Albuquerque, NM

=== National Semifinals ===
June 18, 2003
8:30AM

Chico Rooks	3-0	DS United
Barragan; Morales; Tong

Milwaukee, WI
June 18, 2003
9:00AM

Milwaukee Bavarians	3-2	Bridgeport Italians
N. Dombrowski; Jake Provan; 116' Jake Provan		Barnett; Fernandez

Milwaukee, WI

=== National Final ===
June 19, 2003
7:30PM

Milwaukee Bavarians	5-0	Chico Rooks
7' S. Dombrowski; 19' J. Provan; 55' DaPra; 81' N. Dombrowski; 86' Troskey

Milwaukee, WI

== George F. Donnelly Cup ==
The tournament took place from January 18–20 at Nova Southeastern University in Fort Lauderdale, FL.

Men's Tournament

January 18, 2003
2:30PM

California–South	1-2	North Texas

Ft. Lauderdale, FL
January 18, 2003
3:00PM

Connecticut	1-2	Nebraska

Ft. Lauderdale, FL
January 19, 2003
12:00PM

North Texas	3-4	Nebraska

Ft. Lauderdale, FL
January 19, 2003
12:30PM

California–South	3-0	Connecticut

Ft. Lauderdale, FL
January 20, 2003
11:00AM

Nebraska	0-6	California–South

Ft. Lauderdale, FL
January 20, 2003
11:00AM

Connecticut	0-1	North Texas

Ft. Lauderdale, FL

Champion: California–South
MVP: Jason Thompson (Cal South)

Women's Tournament

January 18, 2003
12:30PM

Iowa	3-2	Massachusetts

Ft. Lauderdale, FL
January 18, 2003
1:00PM

California–North	4-0	Tennessee

Ft. Lauderdale, FL
January 19, 2003
10:00AM

Iowa	2-1	Tennessee

Ft. Lauderdale, FL
January 19, 2003
10:30AM

Massachusetts	0-5	California–North

Ft. Lauderdale, FL
January 20, 2003
8:45AM

California–North	8-1	Iowa

Ft. Lauderdale, FL
January 20, 2003
8:45AM

Massachusetts	0-0	Tennessee

Ft. Lauderdale, FL

Champion: California–North
MVP: Chardonnay Poole (Cal North)

== See also ==
2003 U.S. Open Cup
