= 1995 National Amateur Cup =

Soccer tournament

Following are the results of the 1995 National Amateur Cup, the annual amateur cup held by the United States Adult Soccer Association.

== Quarterfinals ==
June 18, 1995

Team Lapine	3-0	Bridgeport Italians

June 11, 1995

AAC Eagles	4-1	Thermadyne

Kuntz Stadium
Indianapolis, IN
May 29, 1995

Raleigh United	6-3	Atlanta Ethio
6', 11', 44', 54', 75' Neal; 80' Lamb		45', 81' Elisho own goal

Nashville, TN
May 29, 1995

Denver Kickers	W-L	Alianza

Denver, CO

== Semifinals ==
July 14, 1995
6:30 PM

Raleigh United	1-2	Team Lapine
		30’ Darryl Stewart; 47’ Tim Ashe

Kuntz Stadium
Indianapolis, IN
July 14, 1995
7:00 PM

Denver Kickers	3-1	AAC Eagles
Smith		Stevens (2)

Kuntz Stadium
Indianapolis, IN

== Final ==
July 16, 1995	Team Lapine	0–0	Denver Kickers	Indianapolis, IN
1:00PM				Stadium: Kuntz Stadium
Note: Denver Kickers won 5–3 on penalties

=== Men's Over 30 ===
Semifinals

July 14, 1995
1:30 PM

Atlanta Datagraphics	1-0	Hunter

Kuntz Stadium
Indianapolis, IN
July 14, 1995
2:00 PM

Lake City Hawks	1-3	Kutis
		Ted Hantak (2); John Klein

Kuntz Stadium
Indianapolis, IN

Final

July 16, 1995
11:30 AM

Kutis	4-0	Atlanta Datagraphics
Ted Hantack; Steve Maurer; Tim Walters; John Hayes

Kuntz Stadium
Indianapolis, IN
Referee: John Konstantinidis

=== Women's Amateur ===
Semifinals

July 14, 1995
4:00 PM

Sacramento Storm	5-2	J.B. Marine
Brandi Chastain (4); Julie Foudy

Kuntz Stadium
Indianapolis, IN
July 14, 1995
6:00 PM

Orlando Lions	1-2	L.I. Lady Rough Riders

Kuntz Stadium
Indianapolis, IN

Final

July 16, 1995
11:00 AM

Sacramento Storm	4-1	L.I. Lady Rough Riders
Julie Foudy

Kuntz Stadium
Indianapolis, IN

=== Women's Over–30 ===
Semifinals

July 14, 1995
11:00 AM

Vikings United	4-0	St. Louis Kickers
Nilica

Kuntz Stadium
Indianapolis, IN
July 14, 1995
11:30 AM

Sting 30	0-2	TBA Soccer Association
Rex; Cornell; Gmitter		Rappolt; Miller

Kuntz Stadium
Indianapolis, IN

Final

July 16, 1995
10:00 AM

TBA Soccer Association	3-2	Vikings United

Kuntz Stadium
Indianapolis, IN
Referee: Roger O'Brien

== U.S. Open Cup Qualifying ==
The winners of each region are entered into the First round proper of the U.S. Open Cup.

Region I
Semifinals

May 7, 1995

Greek American Atlas	4-1	Brooklyn Italians
Carl Christian (2); Shan Wiseman; Roberto Jara

New York
May 1995

Philadelphia Flames	L-W	Fairfax Spartans

Final

May 1995	Greek American Atlas	1–1	Fairfax Spartans
Note: Greek American won on penalties

Region II
Semifinals

May 20, 1995

AAC Eagles	w/o	Kansas City

May 20, 1995

Thermadyne	W–L	Milwaukee Kickers

Final

June 4, 1995

AAC Eagles	4–1	Thermadyne

Region III
Semifinals

May 13, 1995

Excel	5-1	Raleigh United

New Orleans, LA
May 13, 1995

St. Petersburgh Kickers	3-2	North Texas

New Orleans, LA

Final

May 14, 1995

St. Petersburgh Kickers	4-1	Excel

New Orleans, LA

Region IV
Semifinals

April 29, 1995

San Nicolas	2-0	Dirty Dozen

April 29, 1995

CD Mexico	1-2	Flamengo SC

San Francisco, CA

Final

May 20, 1995

San Nicolas	0-5	Flamengo

Santa Barbara, CA

== George F. Donnelly Cup ==
Tournament took place from November 24–26 at Brian Piccolo in Ft. Lauderdale, FL. The following state select teams were represented:

Men's Tournament

November 24, 1995
8:00PM

Connecticut	0-3	California–North

Ft. Lauderdale, FL
November 24, 1995
6:30PM

Indiana	1-0	Florida

Ft. Lauderdale, FL
November 25, 1995
12:00PM

Florida	2-1	Connecticut

Ft. Lauderdale, FL
November 25, 1995
12:00PM

California–North	1-2	Indiana

Ft. Lauderdale, FL
November 26, 1995
11:00AM

California North	1-3	Florida

Ft. Lauderdale, FL
November 26, 1995
11:00AM

Indiana	2-0	Connecticut

Ft. Lauderdale, FL

Champion: Indiana Select

Women's Tournament

November 24, 1995
4:30PM

Metro DC–Virginia	-	North Texas

Ft. Lauderdale, FL
November 24, 1995
6:30PM

California–South	-	Southern Ohio

Ft. Lauderdale, FL
November 25, 1995
10:00AM

Metro DC–Virginia	-	Southern Ohio

Ft. Lauderdale, FL
November 25, 1995
10:00AM

North Texas	-	California–South

Ft. Lauderdale, FL
November 26, 1995
9:00AM

North Texas	3-2	Southern Ohio

Ft. Lauderdale, FL
November 26, 1995
9:00AM

California–South	w/o	Metro DC–Virginia

Ft. Lauderdale, FL

Champion: California–South

== See also ==
1995 U.S. Open Cup
