= 2000 National Amateur Cup =

Soccer tournament

Following are the results of the 2000 National Amateur Cup, the annual amateur cup held by the United States Adult Soccer Association.

== Quarterfinals ==
June 18, 2000
2:30PM

Ukrainian Nationals	W-L	Patrick Real Wyckoff

Trenton, NJ
May 29, 2000

Legends	1-0	Georgia

Tulsa, OK

== Semifinals ==
July 21, 2000
4:30PM

Legends	W-L	Santa Clara Sporting

Oakford, PA
July 21, 2000
8:00PM

Ukrainian Nationals	1-5	Southfield Arsenal

Oakford, PA

== Final ==
July 18, 2000
1:00PM

Southfield Arsenal	1-0	Legends
Scott Barbinski

Oakford, PA

=== Men's Over 30 ===
June 18, 2000

Needham United	1-5	VE Erzgebirge

Trenton, NJ

Semifinals

July 21, 2000
3:00PM

Data Graphics	W-L	Lake City Hawks

Oakford, PA
July 21, 2000
6:30PM

VE Erzgebirge	W-L	PNA

Oakford, PA

Final

July 23, 2000

VE Erzgebirge	4-2	Atlanta Data Graphics
Mike Serban (2); Scott Reiber; Jamie McGroarty

Oakford, PA

=== Men's Under 23 ===
Semifinals

July 21, 2000
11:30AM

Oklahoma SC	W-L	Internazionale

Oakford, PA
July 21, 2000
1:30PM

Greater Boston Eagles	W-L	Cleveland Kickers

Oakford, PA

Final

July 23, 2000

Internazionale	W-L

Oakford, PA

=== Men's Under 20 ===
Semifinals

July 21, 2000
10:30AM

Memphis FC	W-L	Colorado Rush

Oakford, PA
July 21, 2000
12:30PM

Medford Strikers Red	W-L	Busch

Oakford, PA

Final

July 23, 2000

Colorado Rush	W-L

Oakford, PA

=== Women's Open ===
July 21, 2000
9:00 PM

Team Heat	L-W	Ajax Farm

Oakford, PA
June 21, 2000
9:00 PM

Patrick Real Wyckoff	L-W	Detroit Rocker Hawks

Trentond, NJ

Final

July 23, 2000

Ajax	2-1	Detroit Rocker Hawks

Oakford, PA

=== Women's Amateur ===
Semifinals

July 21, 2000
2:30PM

Turbo	L-W	Real Colorado

Oakford, PA
July 21, 2000
4:30PM

Opus County	-	J.B. Marine

Oakford, PA

Final

July 18, 2000

Real Colorado Rush	W-L

Oakford, PA

=== Women's Over–30 ===
Semifinals

July 21, 2000
3:30PM

Sting 30	W-L	Zenith Bohemians

Oakford, PA
July 21, 2000
6:30PM

Total Sports Pavilion	1-0	J.B. Marine
Linda Dinga

Oakford, PA

Final

July 22, 2000

Total Sports Pavilion	3-2	Sting 30
Colleen O'Day; 87' Gayle Smith (pk); 93' Cathy Welch

Oakford, PA

=== Women's Under 23 ===
Semifinals

July 21, 2000
11:00AM

Outrage	W-L	Colorado Stars

Oakford, PA
July 21, 2000
1:00PM

BFC Energizer	0-4	Detroit Rocker Hawks

Oakford, PA

Final

July 23, 2000

Outrage	W-L	Detroit Rocker Hawks

Oakford, PA

=== Women's Under 20 ===
Semifinals

July 21, 2000
11:30AM

Texas Image	W-L	Real Colorado

Oakford, PA
July 21, 2000
1:30PM

Windsor World Class	W-L	J.B. Marine

Oakford, PA

Final

July 23, 2000

Windsor World Class	W-L

Oakford, PA

== Veteran's Cup ==
The Veteran's Cup took place from June 30 – July 2 at Mine Falls Park and Main Dunstable School in Nashua, NH.

Men’s Over 40 Premier
Final

July 2, 2000

New Haven United	2-1	Scotland Yard

Nashua, NH

Men’s Over 50
Final

July 2, 2000

Texas Wanderers	4-3	Over The Hill

Nashua, NH

Women’s Over 40
Final

July 2, 2000

Camp Spring	1-0	Copa De Vida
20' Laurie Albrecht

Nashua, NH

Champion: Camp Springs (Maryland)
Coach: Dr. William Blandford
Roster: Laurie Albrecht, Denise Carley, Alice Deppe, Betsy Ferris, Claire Hanelin, Chris Hazell, Regina Jenkins, Laura LeMire, Mary Neilon, Mary Jo O'Connell, Leslie Pearson, Donna Ryan, Tina Santos, Kathy Seymour, Pam Shields, Valerie Stello.

Women’s Over 50
Final

July 2, 2000

Virginia Vintage	2-1	Zodiac

Nashua, NH

== Coed Cup ==
The Coed Cup took place at the Sportsplex soccer fields in League City, TX.

Open Division
Champion: Conquistadores/Fado Irish Pub (Metro DC/Virginia)

Over 30 Division
Champion: Kickers (Florida)

== Open Cup Qualifying ==
=== Quarterfinals ===
May 21, 2000

Jerry D's	2-1	Stamford Olympia
Joe Koziol (2)		Toma Gojevic

Baltimore, MD
May 21, 2000

Milwaukee Bavarian	5-0	Southfield Arsenal
8' Klopp; 18' Beck; 35' Dan Stebbins; 50', 53' Cartledge

Glendale, WI
May 27, 2000

Los Lobos	0-5	Uruguay SC

Tulsa, OK
May 21, 2000
1:00PM

Real Colorado	0-5	Mexico SC

Denver, CO

=== Semifinals ===
July 21, 2000
8:30AM

Uruguay SC	0-1	Mexico SC
		90'+ Joel Ramirez

Oakford, PA
July 21, 2000
9:30AM

Jerry D's	1-4	Milwaukee Bavarian
Tim Wittman		Nick Igel; Jon Szczepanski; Scott Kreitmeir; Craig Posselt

Oakford, PA

=== Final ===
July 22, 2000
4:00PM

Mexico SC	1-0	Bavarian Leinenkugel
30' Orlando Ramirez

Oakford, PA

Champions: Mexico SC
Coach: Ramon Mendoza
Roster: Eliseo Shorty Lopez, Fidel Chavez, Jeremy Schultz, Francisco Alvarez, Edgardo Contreras, Jose Luis Capi Delgadillo, Jesus Ortuño, Roberto Coronado, Milton Blanco, Orlando Ramirez, Eddie Rodriguez, Marcos Lopez, Oscar Ruelas, Joel Ramirez.

== George F. Donnelly Cup ==
The tournament took place from November 24–26 in Ft. Lauderdale, FL.

Men's Tournament
Champion: Eastern New York State (Region I)

Women's Tournament
Champion: California-North (Region IV)
Coaches: Rick Caldwell, J. T. Thomas
Roster: Emmy Barr, LaKeysia Beene, Emily Burt, Kelsey Carlson, Ronnie Fair, Elie Foster, Megan Horvath, Carmel Murphy, Carly Smolak, Cary Sanchez-Raygor, Maite Zabala.

== U.S. Soccer Festival ==
The tournament took place at the University of Rhode Island in Kingston, RI from July 31 – August 5.

Men's Tournament

August 1, 2000
3:00PM

U.S. U–18	1-1	Midwest

Kingston, RI
August 1, 2000
6:30PM

Rhode Island All–Stars	0-2	West

Kingston, RI
August 1, 2000
6:45PM

U.S. U–20	-	South

Kingston, RI
August 1, 2000
8:30PM

Canada U–20	-	East

Kingston, RI
August 2, 2000
3:00PM

Rhode Island All–Stars	1-1	Midwest

Kingston, RI
August 2, 2000
3:00PM

U.S. U–18	-	West

Kingston, RI
August 2, 2000
6:45PM

Canada U–20	-	South

Kingston, RI
August 2, 2000
8:30PM

U.S. U–20	4-0	East
17', 30', 72', 77' Abe Thompson

Kingston, RI
August 4, 2000
3:00PM

East	-	South

Kingston, RI
August 4, 2000
3:00PM

West	-	Midwest

Kingston, RI
August 4, 2000
6:45PM

Rhode Island All–Stars	1-4	U.S. U–18

Kingston, RI
August 4, 2000
8:30PM

U.S. U–20	1-2	Canada U–20
52' Conor Casey		30' Gaspare Borselino; 80' Julian DeGuzman

Kingston, RI

Exhibition

August 5, 2000
6:00PM

U.S. U–20	-	U.S. U–18

Kingston, RI

Third place

August 5, 2000
4:30PM

East	1-3	Midwest
		Gavin Clinton (2)

Kingston, RI

Final

August 5, 2000
8:00PM

West	W-L	South

Kingston, RI

Champions: USASA Region IV West

Women's Tournament

August 1, 2000
3:00PM

U.S. U–18	-	Midwest

Kingston, RI
August 1, 2000
3:00PM

USYSA U–17	-	West

Kingston, RI
August 1, 2000
3:00PM

California Storm	-	South

Kingston, RI
August 1, 2000
3:00PM

U.S. U–16	-	East

Kingston, RI
August 2, 2000
3:00Pm

U.S. U–18	-	West

Kingston, RI
August 2, 2000
3:00PM

U.S. U–16	-	South

Kingston, RI
August 2, 2000
3:00PM

USYSA U–17	-	Midwest

Kingston, RI
August 2, 2000
6:30PM

East	-	California Storm

Kingston, RI
August 4, 2000
3:00PM

East	-	South

Kingston, RI
August 4, 2000
3:00PM

U.S. U–16	-	California Storm

Kingston, RI
August 4, 2000
3:00PM

U.S. U–18	-	USYSA U–17

Kingston, RI
August 4, 2000
6:30PM

West	2-0	Midwest

Kingston, RI

Exhibition

August 5, 2000
4:00PM

U.S. U–18	-	California Storm

Kingston, RI

Exhibition

August 5, 2000
4:00PM

U.S. U–16	-	USYSA U–17

Kingston, RI

Third place

August 5, 2000
4:30PM

East	-	Midwest

Kingston, RI

Final

August 5, 2000
6:30PM

West	W-L	South

Kingston, RI

Champions: USASA Region IV West

== See also ==
2000 U.S. Open Cup
