= 1996 National Amateur Cup =

Soccer tournament

Following are the results of the 1996 National Amateur Cup, the annual amateur cup held by the United States Adult Soccer Association.

== Quarterfinals ==
June 1996

Washington Iberia	3-2	Bridgeport Italians

June 1996

Seattle Hibernian	1-0	Santa Clara Sporting

June 1996

Cleveland Kickers	5-0	Ann Arbor

June 1996

Dallas Speed	4-1	Raleigh United

== Semifinals ==
July 19, 1996
6:00 PM

Iberia SC	5-2	Hibernian Saints
Ferry (2); Hayes (2); Hult		McCargo (2)

St. Louis Soccer Park
St. Louis, Missouri
July 19, 1996
8:00 PM

Cleveland Kickers	1-2	Dallas Speed
Smith		Stevens (2)

St. Louis Soccer Park
St. Louis, Missouri

== Final ==
July 21, 1996
1:00 PM

Iberia S.C.	2-1	Dallas Speed
Matthew Ferry(2)		Ivan Polic

St. Louis Soccer Park
St. Louis, Missouri
Referee: Kevin Yant

MVP: Matthew Ferry (Iberia)
Lineups:
Iberia S.C.– Walter Tombini, Walter Gill, Matthew Ferry, Moataz El-Said, Sean Roach, Elias Christian, David Hayes, Andrew Zamora, James Kelley, Orjan Hutt, Dan Daugherty.
Dallas Speed– Jason Phillips, Brett Duarte, Jeff Wagner, Steven Jay, Ivan Polic, Patrick Fraley, Jason Walls, Scott Cramford, Michael Reasheres, Heath Danford, Michael Curtis.

=== Men's Over 30 ===
Quarterfinals

June 1996

La Dolce Vita	3-1	Needham

June 1996

Suncoast	4-0	Soccer Nut

June 1996

Greek–Americans	2-1	Lake City Hawks

June 1996

Kutis O–30	3-1	Needham

Semifinals

July 19, 1996
6:00 PM

Kutis O–30	3-1	Suncoast
John Hayes; Tony Glavin; Steve Mauer		Peter Lamb

St. Louis Soccer Park
St. Louis, Missouri
July 19, 1996
8:00 PM

La Dolce Vita	0-1	Greek–Americans A.C.
		Brooks

St. Louis Soccer Park
St. Louis, Missouri

Final

July 21, 1996
12:00 PM

Kutis O–30	3-4	SF Greek–American
Mauer; Terry; Hays		Deteray; Petuskey; Elberse; Brockman

St. Louis Soccer Park
St. Louis, Missouri
Referee: John Konstantinidis

MVP: Stephen Petosky (Greek Americans)
Lineups:
Greek Americans– Aram Kardzair, Jan Elberse, Erik Jensen, Dan McNevin, Glen Van Shaatum, John Brooks, Derek Van Rheenen, Mike Nieto, Stephen Petuskey, Todd Brockman, Steve Mauer, Ronnie Morris, Mike Twellman, Eric Visser, Michael Delanay, Matthew McPhee.
Kutis O-30– Patrick Baker, Terry Brown, Jeff Cacciatore, Mark Fredrickson, Tony Glavin, Tom Groark, Tom Hayes, John Hayes, Jimmy Kavanaugh, Tim Louchman, Rick Reiner.

=== Women's Open ===
Quarterfinals

June 1996

Sacramento Storm	2-1	Ajax

June 1996

Texas Lightning	2-0	Thunder

Semifinals

July 19, 1996

Sacramento Storm	W-L	Region I/II winner

Albuquerque, New Mexico
July 19, 1996

Texas Lightning	W-L	Region I/II winner

Albuquerque, New Mexico

Finals

July 20, 1996
7:30 PM

Sacramento Storm	1-2	Texas Lightning

Albuquerque, New Mexico

=== Women's Amateur ===
Quarterfinals

June 1996

Soccer Academy	2-1	Opus County

June 1996

Team Excel	4-0	Houston Challengers

June 1996

Trintoc Premier	2-1	Columbine Istari

June 1996

J.B. Marine	W-L	Region II finalist

Semifinals

July 19, 1996
2:00 PM

J.B. Marine	6-2	Team Excel
Grose (3); Kraay; McCarthy; Stevens		Geltz; Barnes

SIU at Edwardsville
St. Louis, Missouri
July 19, 1996
6:00 PM

Soccer Academy	6-2	Trintoc Premier
Kunihiro (2); Rahrman (2); Andersen; Goldblatt		Peck; Pizzo

St. Louis Soccer Park
St. Louis, Missouri

Final

July 21, 1996
11:00 AM

Soccer Academy	6-0	J.B. Marine
Goldblatt (3); Demco (2); Smith

SIU at Edwardsville
St. Louis, Missouri
Referee: Paul Scott

MVP: Michelle Demko (Soccer Academy)
Lineups:
Soccer Academy– Megan McCarthy, Jill Ellis, Laura Kerrigan, Randy Goldblatt, Jeanny McMahon, Keri Dzczkanica, Nancy Rahrman, Jeanny Smith, Trisha Tagliaferro, Michelle Demko, Cindy Kunihiro, Peggy McCarthy, Betsy Andersen, M. Hoefler.
J.B. Marine– Lisa Berra, Sara Burkett, Tory Dolan, Tracy Grose, Erin Grimsley, Ann Kerber, Michell McCarthy, Lindsey Roetar, Emily Stevens, Harper Mance, Liz Latown, Kristin Bocker, Stephanie Kraay, Susan Kraegen.

=== Women's Over–30 ===
Quarterfinals

June 1996

TBA Soccer Association	2-0	Brentwood

June 1996

Dallas Sting 30	4-0	Atlanta Breeze

June 1996

San Francisco Vikings	4-3	Emerald City Rain

June 1996

St. Louis Kickers	W-L	Region II finalist

Semifinals

July 19, 1996
10:00 AM

St. Louis Kickers	1-0	Sting 30
Nilica

SIU at Edwardsville
St. Louis, Missouri
July 19, 1996
12:00 PM

TBA Soccer Association	3-2	San Francisco Vikings
Rex; Cornell; Gmitter		Rappolt; Miller

SIU at Edwardsville
St. Louis, Missouri

Final

July 21, 1996
10:00 AM

St. Louis Kickers	1-3	TBA Soccer Association
Stipper		Ashley; Rex; Pickering

SIU at Edwardsville
St. Louis, Missouri
Referee: Roger O'Brien

MVP: Sandy Rex (TBA Soccer)
Lineups:
TBA Soccer Association– Coleen O'Day, Pam Cornell, Kim Crabbe, Ann Germain, Lisa Gmitter, Helen Norton, Emily Pickering, Sandy Rex, Sibyl Tilson, Williamson.
St. Louis Kickers– Terry Long, Margaret Ashley, Patrice Kelley, Theresa Beck, Jaqueline Leach, Mary Wilmering, Christi Nilica, Jo Marie Hughes, Dianna Brokaw, Linda Becker, Patty Stipper, Neen Kelley.

== U.S. Open Cup Qualifying ==
The winners of each region are entered into the First round proper of the U.S. Open Cup.

Region I

June 1996

Mo's Sports Shop	1-0	Greek–American/Atlas

Region II

May 19, 1996

RWB Adria	3-2	Milwaukee Kickers

Region III

May 11, 1996

St. Petersburgh Kickers	4-1	Houston Rangers

Region IV

June 1996

San Jose Oaks	2-0	Cassal SC

== George F. Donnelly Cup ==
Tournament took place from November 29–December 1 at Brian Piccolo Park in Ft. Lauderdale, FL. The following state select teams were represented:
Men– (Region I) Eastern Pennsylvania, (Region II) Minnesota, (Region III) Florida, (Region IV) California-North.
Women– (Region I) Eastern New York, (Region II) Southern Ohio, (Region III) Florida, (Region IV) Oregon.

Men's Tournament

November 29, 1996
4:30PM

Eastern Pennsylvania	-	California North

November 29, 1996
6:30PM

Minnesota	-	Florida

November 30, 1996
12:00PM

Florida	-	Eastern Pennsylvania

November 30, 1996
12:00PM

California North	-	Minnesota

December 1, 1996
11:00AM

California North	-	Florida

December 1, 1996
11:00AM

Minnesota	-	Eastern Pennsylvania

Champion: California North
MVP: Phil Karn (Eastern Pennsylvania)

Women's Tournament

November 29, 1996
4:30PM

Florida	-	Eastern New York

November 29, 1996
6:30PM

Oregon	-	Southern Ohio

November 30, 1996
10:00AM

Florida	-	Oregon

November 30, 1996
10:00AM

Eastern New York	-	Southern Ohio

December 1, 1996
9:00AM

Eastern New York	-	Oregon

December 1, 1996
9:00AM

Southern Ohio	-	Florida

Champion: Eastern New York
Women's MVP: Noelle Meeke (Eastern New York)

== U.S. Soccer Festival ==
The tournament took place at the Retama Polo Center in San Antonio, TX from August 4–10.

Men's Tournament

August 6, 1996

South	3-1	East

San Antonio, TX
August 6, 1996

West	2-1	U.S. Armed Forces

San Antonio, TX
August 6, 1996

U.S. U–20	1-1	North

San Antonio, TX
August 7, 1996
4:30PM

U.S. U–20	1-2	East

San Antonio, TX
August 7, 1996

U.S. Armed Forces	0-4	South

San Antonio, TX
August 7, 1996
6:30PM

West	4-0	North

San Antonio, TX
August 8, 1996
4:30PM

U.S. Armed Forces	1-4	East

San Antonio, TX
August 8, 1996
6:30PM

West	0-2	U.S. U–20

San Antonio, TX
August 8, 1996
6:30PM

North	3-6	South

San Antonio, TX

Fifth place

August 9, 1996
5:00PM

North	6-3	U.S. Armed Forces

San Antonio, TX

Third place

August 9, 1996	U.S. U–20	0–0	East	San Antonio, TX
7:00PM
Note: U.S. U–20 won 4–2 on penalties

Final

August 10, 1996

South	3-2	West
Ross Paulie; Gary Gilmore		Andrew Gregor

San Antonio, TX

Champions: South
Roster: Goalkeepers — Jon Busch, Gabriel Wolf; Defenders — Todd Denault, Rob Heald, Damon Hughes, John Mulrooney; Midfielders — Josh Campbell. Sergio Jaramillo, Chad Leeper, Mike Meckleberg, Richard Mulrooney, Ross Paule, Doug Schenkel; Forwards—Gary Gilmore, Allen Kozic, Juan Carlos Mendoza.

Women's Tournament

August 5, 1996

West	2-2	North

San Antonio, TX
August 5, 1996

South	2-0	East

San Antonio, TX
August 6, 1996

U.S. U–16	0-0	West

San Antonio, TX
August 6, 1996

North	1-0	South

San Antonio, TX
August 7, 1996
4:30PM

South	1-3	West

San Antonio, TX
August 7, 1996
6:30PM

East	0-3	U.S. U–16

San Antonio, TX
August 8, 1996
4:30PM

U.S. U–16	1-1	South

San Antonio, TX
August 8, 1996
6:30AM

North	4-1	East

San Antonio, TX
August 9, 1996
5:00PM

East	0-3	West

San Antonio, TX
August 9, 1996
9:00PM

U.S. U–16	0-1	North

San Antonio, TX

Final

August 10, 1996

West	1-0	North
Heather Aldama

San Antonio, TX

Champions: West
Roster: Erin Fahey, Kimberly Stiles, Jody Payne, Heather Aldama, Tari Beck, Melissa Ribaudo, Jennca Johnson, Robyn Bretzing, Jennifer Agao, Laurie Hegedorn, Tara Bilanski, Rita Hermiz, Becky Hogan, Lisa Busch, Michelle Voiland.

== See also ==
1996 U.S. Open Cup
