= United States Adult Soccer Association =

Amateur soccer organization

USSF
- Short name: USASA
- Founded: 1982; 44 years ago
- Headquarters: Geneva
- Location: Bridgeview, Illinois
- USSF affiliation: 1982
- President: Jim Sadowski
- Vice-President: Fritz Marth
- Website: usadultsoccer.com

The United States Adult Soccer Association (USASA) is a national organization for amateur soccer in the United States. It consists of 54 state associations in four regions, as well as national, regional, and state leagues. It compares to the United States Youth Soccer Association and its 54 affiliated State Associations – as it was once all one bodied structure.

== History ==
The USASA was founded in 1982 at the first meeting of the Senior Division of the United States Soccer Federation. Later that year, the United States Soccer Federation reorganized and the senior division became a separate member. The USASA has been known as the United States Senior Soccer Division, the United States Soccer Association, the United States Amateur Soccer Association, and finally its current name of the United States Adult Soccer Association.

== Presidents ==
Years	Name	Organization	Ref.
1982–1983	Millton Aimi	Texas South	
1983–1984	Jim Depew	Texas North	
1984–1989	Edward Nunes	California North	
1989–1991	Millton Aimi	Texas South	
1991–1997	Gianfranco Borroni	Ohio North	
1997–2006	Mike Edwards	New Mexico	
2006–2010	Brooks McCormick	Florida	
2010–2014	Richard Groff	Eastern Pennsylvania	
2014–2024	John Motta	New Hampshire	
2024–present	Jim Sadowski	Metropolitan DC/Virginia	

== Organization ==
USASA is governed by an executive committee composed of a president, vice-president, treasurer, secretary, four regional directors, two at-large members, affiliate director and an independent director. USASA is organized into four regions which break down into 54 affiliated state associations. National Leagues must extend across all four time-zones, have 36 teams and play for a minimum of three months. USASA rules also provide for multi-state leagues which span four states, involve sixteen teams, and play for at least three months per year.

USASA has one men's national league, the National Premier Soccer League, and two women's national leagues, the Women's Premier Soccer League and the United Women's Soccer. USASA's multi-state leagues are Cascadia Premier League, Eastern Development Program, American Premier Soccer League, Mountain Premier League, National Independent Soccer Association, and West Coast Soccer Association. USASA is also affiliated with the American Youth Soccer Organization, the Beer City Cup, Home Team Soccer Tournaments, LLC, SAY Soccer, and US Club Soccer.

== State Premier leagues ==
League	State association	Region	Ref.
Cosmopolitan Soccer League	Eastern New York State Soccer Association	Region I	
Long Island Soccer Football League	Eastern New York State Soccer Association	Region I	
United Soccer League of Pennsylvania	Eastern Pennsylvania Soccer Association	Region I	
Maryland Super Soccer League	Maryland State Soccer Association	Region I	
Washington Premier League	Maryland State Soccer Association	Region I	
DC Premier League	Maryland State Soccer Association	Region I	
Buffalo & District Soccer League	Western New York Soccer Association	Region I	
Rochester District Soccer League	Western New York Soccer Association	Region I	
Michigan Premier Soccer League	Michigan Soccer Association	Region II	
Florida Suncoast Soccer League	Florida Adult Soccer Association	Region III	
Atlanta District Amateur Soccer League	Georgia Soccer	Region III	
Colorado Super League	Colorado Soccer	Region IV	
San Francisco Soccer Football League	California Soccer Association North	Region IV	
Utah Premiership Soccer League	Utah Adult Soccer	Region IV	
Wasatch Women Soccer League	Utah Adult Soccer	Region IV	
Evergreen Premier League	Washington State Adult Soccer Association	Region IV	
Northwest Premier League	Washington State Adult Soccer Association	Region IV	

Region I

- Connecticut State Soccer Association
- Delaware Soccer Association
- Maine Soccer Association
- Maryland State Soccer Association
- Mass Adult State Soccer
- New Hampshire Soccer Association
- New Jersey Soccer Association
- Eastern New York State Soccer Association
- Western New York Soccer Association
- Eastern Pennsylvania Soccer Association
- PA West
- Rhode Island Soccer Association
- Vermont State Soccer Association
- Metropolitan DC-Virginia Soccer Association
- West Virginia Soccer Association

Region III

- Alabama Soccer Association
- Arkansas Soccer Association
- Florida Adult Soccer Association
- Georgia Soccer
- Louisiana Soccer Association
- Mississippi Soccer Association
- North Carolina Adult Soccer Association
- Oklahoma Soccer Association
- South Carolina Amateur Soccer Association
- Tennessee Soccer
- Texas North Soccer
- Texas State Soccer Association — South

Region II

- Illinois State Soccer Association
- Indiana Soccer
- Iowa Soccer
- Kansas Soccer Association
- Kentucky Soccer Association
- Michigan Soccer Association
- Minnesota Soccer Association
- Missouri Soccer Association
- Nebraska State Soccer
- Ohio Soccer Assoc. — North
- Southern Ohio Adult Soccer Association
- South Dakota Adult Soccer Association
- Wisconsin Soccer Leagues

'Region IV

- Alaska Adult Soccer Association
- Arizona State Soccer Association
- California Soccer Association North
- California South
- Colorado Soccer
- Hawaii Soccer Association
- Idaho State Soccer Association
- Montana State Soccer Association
- Nevada State Soccer Association
- New Mexico State Soccer Association
- Oregon Adult Soccer Association
- Utah Adult Soccer
- Washington State Adult Soccer Association
- Wyoming Soccer

== Competitions ==
=== Men's ===
==== The USASA National Amateur Cup ====
The National Amateur Cup is the most prestigious and longest running tournament for all of amateur soccer in the entire country, crowning its first champion, Fleisher Yarn in 1924.

To qualify for the national tournament a team must win their respective regional cup. The winner of this tournament is awarded the Fritz Marth Amateur Cup. In addition to the trophy the winner of the National Amateur Cup is awarded an entry into both the Hank Steinbrecher Cup, and the Lamar Hunt US Open Cup, which has been in existence since 1914.

==== Hank Steinbrecher Cup ====
In 2013, USASA and U.S. Soccer began a competition to pit the champions of the different men's amateur competitions (USASA National Amateur Cup, National Premier Soccer League, USL League Two and defending Hank Steinbrecher Cup holder) against each other for the title of "Champions of Champions" The competition eventually allowed in other champions such as those from the United Premier Soccer League, United States Specialty Sports Association and the USASA Werner Fricker champion.

Beginning in 2024, USSF delegated the funding of the cup to the affiliates, including potential reorganization or renaming. In 2026, USSF announced that the winner of the Hank Steinbrecher Cup will earn an automatic bid in the following years U.S. Open Cup. Vermont Green FC earned the automatic bid for the 2027 U.S. Open Cup.

Year	Winner	Result	Runner-up	Third place	Result	Fourth place
2013	Carolina Dynamo (USL PDL)	1–1 (3–2 p)	Lehigh Valley United Sonic (NPSL)	Croatian Eagles (USASA)	3–1	Battery Park Gunners (NAC)
2014	RWB Adria (NAC)	1–0	Sonoma County Sol (NPSL)	NTX Rayados (USASA)		Ocean City Nor'easters (USL PDL)
2015	Chattanooga FC (NPSL)	3–0	Michigan Bucks (USL PDL)	Maryland Bays (USASA)		New York Greek Americans (NAC)
2016	Chicago Fire U23 (USL PDL)	2–1	Chattanooga FC (NPSL)	Quinto Elemento FC (NAC)		West Chester United (USASA)
2017	Michigan Bucks (USL PDL)	3–0	AFC Cleveland (NPSL)	Chicago FC United (Hank Steinbrecher Cup)	4–0	Christos FC (NAC)
2018	Michigan Bucks (2) (Hank Steinbrecher Cup)	2–0	Charlotte Eagles (USL PDL)	Lansdowne Bhoys FC (NAC)	2–1	Elm City Express (NPSL)
2019	Flint City Bucks (3) (Hank Steinbrecher Cup)	3–0	Chicago FC United (USL2)	FC Motown (NPSL)	3–1	Milwaukee Bavarian SC (NAC)
2020	Canceled due to COVID-19 pandemic					
2021	Canceled due to COVID-19 pandemic					
2022	Flint City Bucks (4)(USL2)	2–1	Denton Diablos FC (NPSL)	Lansdowne Bhoys FC (NAC)		Houston Regals (USSSA)
2023	West Chester United SC (NPSL)	4–4 (4–2 p)	Ventura County Fusion (USL2)	Atletico Olympians FC (UPSL)		Athletico Olanchano (USSSA)
2024	Canceled (Note: The 2024 Hank Steinbrecher Cup was set to feature 2023 NPSL national champion Tulsa Athletic (host) and 2024 USSSA national champion Houston Regals. Following Tulsa's suspension from the NPSL, the game was canceled. In response, both teams organized the American Champions Cup on June 29, 2024, which was won by hosts Tulsa Athletic, 2–1.)					
2025	El Farolito SC (NPSL)	1–0	Seacoast United Phantoms (USL2)	Houston Regals (USSSA)		West Chester United SC (NAC)
2026	Vermont Green FC (USL2)	4–1	West Chester United SC (NAC)	Hickory FC (NPSL)		Azteca FC (USSSA)

=== Women's competitions ===
==== Women's Amateur Cup ====
USASA has run two different competitions, starting in 1980. Originally, USASA set up National Women's Amateur, which was open to all amateur teams throughout the country. Through 1995, the Women's Amateur Cup was the highest level of completition in the United States. In 1996, USASA introduced the USASA National Women's Open, but the Women's Amateur Cup continued through 2014. Prior to the Women's Open Cup, Michelob Ladies (TX) was the most successful team with four championships. After the Open Cup, both Soccer Academy United (VA) and Chicago Eclipse Select won the Amateur Cup three times.

==== National Women's Open ====
In 1996, USASA introduced the Women's Open, which was open to all amateur and semi-professional teams in the United States until 2011. In 2009, the competition changed its name to the Women's Cup, reverting to the Women's Open in 2013. Professional teams entered the competition beginning in 2012. In 2015, the competition reverted to fully amateur. After the 2016 Women's Open, the competition was not competed until 2023, when it was reintroduced as a fully amateur competition.

==== Brandi Chastain Cup ====
On March 12, 2025, USASA announced the Brandi Chastain cup which features four top women's amateur teams competing.

Year	Winner	Result	Runner-up	Semi-finalist	
2025	California Storm (WPSL)	4–1	Pan World Elite (NAC)	New England Mutiny (UWS)	Richmond Ivy (USLW)

=== Coed competitions ===
==== Veteran's Cup ====
Established in 1998, the Adult Soccer Fest is formally known as the Veteran's Cup, a 5–day event sponsored by USASA for teams with players 30 years and older. Matches for over–30 teams to over–70 mens are played in an 11 v 11 format, while over–70 women and over–75 teams play in an 7 v 7 format. In December 2024, USASA announced that they would be returning the Adult Soccer fest to its original name Veteran's Cup.

== See also ==
- List of USASA affiliated leagues
