= List of defunct Texas sports teams =

This is a list of former sports teams from the US state of Texas:

== Baseball ==
=== Major leagues ===
==== Negro leagues ====
Sources:

- Austin Black Senators (early 1910s)
- Abilene Eagles
- Cleburne Yellow Jackets
- Dallas Black Giants
- Dallas Brown Bombers
- Dallas Green Monarchs
- Fort Worth Black Cats
- Fort Worth Black Panthers
- Fort Worth Giants
- Fort Worth Wonders
- Galveston Flyaways
- Houston Black Buffaloes
- Houston Eagles
- Jasper Steers
- Mineola Black Spiders
- Paris Giants
- San Angelo Black Sheep Herders
- San Antonio Black Bronchos
- San Antonio Black Indians
- San Antonio Bombers
- Waco Black Cardinals
- Waco Black Navigators
- Waco Yellowjackets
- Waco Tigers
- Wichita Falls Black Spudders

=== Minor leagues ===
==== American Association (20th century) ====
- Houston Buffaloes (1959–1961)

==== American Association of Independent Professional Baseball ====
- Coastal Bend Aviators (2003–2007)

==== Big State League ====
- Abilene Blue Sox (1956–1957), moved from West Texas–New Mexico League
- Austin Pioneers (1947–1955)
- Beaumont Exporters or Beaumont Shippers (1956); Beaumont Pirates (1957)
- Bryan Majors (1953); Bryan Indians (1954)
- Corpus Christi Clippers (1954–1957)
- Del Rio Indians (1954)
- Gainesville Owls (1947–1951)
- Galveston White Caps (1954–1955), moved from Gulf Coast League
- Greenville Majors (1947–1950), moved from East Texas League (1946); Greenville Majors (1953)
- Harlingen Capitals (1954–1955), moved from Gulf Coast League (1951–1953) and Rio Grande Valley League (1950)
- Longview Cherokees (1952–1953)
- Lubbock Hubbers (1956), moved from West Texas–New Mexico League
- Paris Red Peppers (1947), moved from East Texas League (1946); Paris Panthers (1948); Paris Indians (1952–1953)
- Port Arthur Sea Hawks (1955–1956), moved from Evangeline League (1954) and Gulf Coast League (1950–1953); Port Arthur Redlegs (1957)
- Sherman-Denison Twins (1947–1951)
- Temple Eagles (1949–1954); Temple Redlegs (1957)
- Texarkana Bears (1947–1953), moved from East Texas League (1946)
- Texas City Hubbers (1955); Texas City Exporters (1956)
- Tyler East Texans (1951–1953); Tyler Tigers (1954–1955)
- Victoria Eagles (1956); Victoria Rosebuds (1957), moved to Texas League (1958–1961)
- Waco Dons (1947); Waco Pirates (1948–1953), (1954–1956)
- Wichita Falls Spudders 1947–1953, moved to Longhorn League (1954); Wichita Falls Spudders (1956–1957)

==== Central Baseball League ====
- Abilene Prairie Dogs (1995–1999)
- Coastal Bend Aviators (2003–2007)
- Corpus Christi Barracudas
- Lubbock Crickets (?-1995)
- Rio Grande Valley WhiteWings (1994–2003, 2006–2007) now Harlingen WhiteWings (2008–present)
- San Antonio Tejanos (1995)
- Tyler Wildcatters (1994–1997)

==== Continental Baseball League ====
- Texas Heat (2007)

==== Mexican League ====
- Tecolotes de los Dos Laredos (Owls of the Two Laredos) (1940–1984); renamed Tecolotes de Nuevo Laredo (1985–present)

==== Texas Association (Class-C) ====
First stage: 1896/second stage:1923–1926

Teams/years

* Austin Rangers	1923–1924
* Austin Senators	1896, 1925–1926
* Corsicana Oilers	1923–1928
* Dallas Navigators	1896
* Denison Tigers	1896
* Fort Worth Panthers	1896
* Galveston Sandcrabs	1896
* Houston Buffaloes	1896
* Marlin Bathers	1923–1925
* Mexia Gushers	1923–1928
* Palestine Pals	1925–1926
* San Antonio Missionaries	1896
* Sherman Students	1896
* Sherman Twins	1923
* Paris Midlands	1896
* Temple Surgeons	1924–1926
* Terrell Terrors	1925–1926
* Waco Indians	1923–1924

==== Texas League ====
- Alexandria Aces
- Amarillo Giants
- Amarillo Gold Sox (1939–1982)
- Amarillo Sonics
- Ardmore Rosebuds
- Ardmore Territorians
- Austin Braves
- Austin Senators
- Beaumont Exporters (1920–49) and (1953–55)
- Beaumont Golden Gators (1983–1986)
- Beaumont Millionaires
- Beaumont Oil Gushers
- Beaumont Oilers
- Brenham Orphans
- Cleburne Railroaders (1906–1907)
- Corpus Christi Giants
- Corsicana Oil Citys
- Corsicana Oilers
- Dallas Eagles (1958–1964)
- Dallas Giants (1958–1964), under name Dallas Rangers
- Dallas Griffins
- Dallas Marines
- Dallas Rangers (1958–1964)
- Dallas Rebels (1958–1964), under name Dallas Rangers
- Dallas Steers (1958–1964), under name Dallas Rangers
- Dallas Submarines
- Dallas-Fort Worth Spurs (1965–1971)
- El Paso Dodgers
- El Paso Sun Kings
- Fort Worth Cats (1958–1964), under name Dallas Rangers
- Fort Worth Panthers (1958–1964), under name Dallas Rangers
- Galveston Buccaneers
- Galveston Crabs
- Galveston Pirates
- Galveston Sand Crabs
- Houston Buffaloes (1907–1958)
- Houston Wanderers
- Longview Cannibals
- Midland Angels (1985–1998), now Midland RockHounds
- Midland Cubs (1972–1984), now Midland RockHounds
- Paris Eisenfelder's Homeseekers
- Paris Parisites
- Rio Grande Valley Giants (1960–1961)
- San Antonio Bears
- San Antonio Brewers
- San Antonio Bronchos
- San Antonio Bullets
- San Antonio Dodgers (1977–1987), now San Antonio Missions
- San Antonio Indians
- The San Antonio Missions were AA Team that moved to Amarillo in 2018 and renamed Sod Poodles
- Sherman-Denison Students
- Texarkana Casketmakers
- Tyler Sports
- Victoria Rosebuds (1959–1961)
- Victoria Toros
- Waco Cubs
- Waco Navigators
- Waco Steers
- Waco Tigers
- Wichita Falls Spudders (1920–1957)
- Wichita Pilots (1989–2007), became Wichita Wranglers in 1989
- Wichita Wranglers (1989–2007)

==== Texas–Louisiana League ====
- Laredo Apaches (1940–1995)
- Beaumont Bullfrogs (1994)

==== West Texas–New Mexico League ====
- Abilene Apaches (1939); became Abilene Blue Sox (1946–1955)
- Amarillo Gold Sox (1939–1942); Amarillo Gold Sox (1946–1955), moved to Western League 1956–1958
- Big Spring Barons 1938–1940; Big Spring Bombers (1941); Big Spring Pirates (1942)
- Borger Gassers (1939–1942, 1946–1954)
- El Paso Texans (1955), moved to Southwestern League 1956–1957, moved from Arizona–Texas League 1952–1954
- Lamesa Lobos (1939–1941); Lamesa Dodgers (1942); Lamesa Lobos (1946–1952)
- Lubbock Hubbers (1938–1942), (1946–1955), moved to Big State League (1956–1958)
- Midland Cardinals (1937–1938); Midland Cowboys (1939–1940)
- Monahans Trojans (1937)
- Odessa Oilers (1937); Odessa Oilers (1940)
- Pampa Oilers (1939–1942), (1946–1955), moved to Southwestern League (1956–1957)
- Plainview Ponies (1953–1955), moved to Southwestern League (1956–1957)
- Wichita Falls Spudders (1941–1942)
- Wink Spudders (1937–1938)

== Basketball ==
=== Men's ===
==== American Basketball Association ====
- Dallas Chaparrals (1967–1973), became the San Antonio Spurs
- Houston Mavericks (1967–1969)

==== Continental Basketball Association ====
- Wichita Falls Texans (1988–1994)

=== Women's ===
==== National Women's Basketball League ====
- Houston Stealth (2002–2004)

==== Women's National Basketball Association ====
- San Antonio Stars (2003−2017), became the Las Vegas Aces
- Houston Comets (1997–2008)

== Cricket ==
=== Pro Cricket ===
- Texas Arrow Heads (2004)

== Football ==
=== Major football leagues ===
==== American Football League–National Football League ====
- Houston Oilers (1960–1996), became the Tennessee Oilers (1997–1998), then renamed the Tennessee Titans
- Dallas Texans (1952)
- Dallas Texans (1960–1962), became the Kansas City Chiefs

==== Canadian Football League ====
- San Antonio Texans (1995)

==== Spring Football League ====
- Houston Marshals (2000)
- San Antonio Matadors (2000)

==== United States Football League ====
- Houston Gamblers (1984–1985)
- San Antonio Gunslingers (1984–1985)

==== World Football League ====
- San Antonio Wings (1975)
- Houston Texans (1974–1975)

==== World League of American Football ====
- San Antonio Riders (1991–1992)

=== Arena-indoor football ===
==== American Professional Football League ====
- Conroe Storm (2007–2008)
- Texas Thunder (2004)
- Wichita Falls Diablos (2008)

==== Arena Football League ====
- Austin Wranglers (2004–2007)
- Dallas Desperados (2002–2008)
- Dallas Texans (1990–1993)
- Fort Worth Cavalry (1994)
- Houston Thunderbears (1996–2001)
- San Antonio Force (1992)
- San Antonio Talons (2012–2014)
- Texas Terror (1996–1997)

==== Alliance of American Football AFL ====
- San Antonio Commanders (2019)

==== AF2 ====
- Laredo Law

==== Champions Indoor Football ====
- San Angelo Bandits (2015–2016)

==== Indoor Professional Football League ====
- Texas Terminators (1999)

==== Intense Football League ====
- El Paso Rumble (2004)
- Laredo Lobos (2006–2007)
- Lubbock Lone Stars (2004–2005)

==== National Indoor Football League ====
- Beaumont Drillers (2003–2008)
- Fort Worth Sixers (2007)
- Houston Wild Riders (2007)
- Lubbock Gunslingers (2004–2005)
- San Antonio Steers (2007)
- Waco Marshals (2004)
- Wichita Falls Thunder (2004)

==== Professional Indoor Football League ====
- Texas Bullets (1998)

==== Women's Professional Football League ====
- Austin Rage (2003)
- Tulsa Black Widows (2006)

== Hockey ==
=== Ice hockey ===
==== American Hockey League ====
- Houston Aeros (1994–2013)
- San Antonio Rampage 2002-2020 - Team moved to Las Vegas for the 2020–2021 season

==== American Hockey Association (1926–1942) ====
- Dallas Texans (1941–1945)
- Fort Worth Rangers (1941–1945)

==== Central Hockey League ====
Includes teams that began in the WPHL before the merger in 2001.

- Amarillo Gorillas/Rattlers (1996–2010)
- Austin Ice Bats (1996–2008)
- Border City Bandits (Texarkana, Texas, 2000–2001)
- Corpus Christi IceRays (1998–2010)
- Dallas Freeze (1992–1995)
- El Paso Buzzards (1996–2003)
- Fort Worth Brahmas (1997–2013)
- Fort Worth Fire (1992–1999)
- Laredo Bucks (2002–2012)
- Lubbock Cotton Kings (1999–2007)
- Odessa Jackalopes (1997–2011)
- Rio Grande Valley Killer Bees (2003–2012)
- San Angelo Saints/Outlaws (1997–2005)
- San Antonio Iguanas (1994–1997, 1998–2002)

==== Central Hockey League (1963–1984) ====
- Amarillo Wranglers (1968–1969, 1970–1971)
- Dallas Black Hawks (1967–1981)
- Fort Worth Texans (1974–1982)
- Fort Worth Wings (1967–1974)
- Houston Apollos (1965–1969)

==== Southwest Hockey League (1975–1977) ====
- Amarillo Wranglers (1975–1977)

==== United States Hockey League ====
- Dallas Texans (1945–46, 1948–49)
- Fort Worth Rangers (1945–49)
- Houston Huskies (1947–1949)
- Houston Skippers (1946–47)

==== Western Professional Hockey League ====
Teams that did not join the CHL in 2001:

- Central Texas Stampede (1996–2001)
- Lake Charles Ice Pirates (1997–2001)
- Waco Wizards (1996–2000)

==== World Hockey Association ====
- Houston Aeros (1972–1978)

=== Roller hockey ===
==== Roller Hockey International ====
- Austin Chiles (1999)
- Dallas Stallions (1999)

== Soccer ==
=== Men's ===
==== Continental Indoor Soccer League ====
- Dallas Sidekicks (1983–2004)
- Houston Hotshots (1993–2000)

==== Lone Star Soccer Alliance ====
- Austin Thunder (1987–92)
- Dallas Inter (1987–92), as Dallas Express in 1987, as Dallas Mean Green in 1988, as F.C. Dallas in 1989–91
- Houston Alianza (1988–91)
- Houston Dynamos–Houston International (1987–1991)
- Houston Summit (1978–1980)
- San Antonio Alamo (1987–90, as San Antonio International in 1987–89)
- San Antonio XLR8 (1992)
- Wichita Falls Fever (1989–92)

==== North American Soccer League ====
- Dallas Tornado (1967–1981)
- Houston Hurricane (1978–1980)
- Houston Stars (1968)

==== United Soccer Leagues ====
- Amarillo Challengers
- Austin Lightning (2002–2007)
- Austin Lone Stars (1987–2000)
- Dallas Americans (1984–85)
- Dallas Lightning (1993–1996); originally Tyler Lightning, then Texas Lightning
- Dallas Rockets (1991–1992)
- El Paso/Juarez Gamecocks (1985)
- Houston Dynamos (1984)
- Houston Express (1988–1990)
- Houston Force (1995)
- San Antonio Scorpions (2011–2015)

=== Women's ===
==== Women's Premier Soccer League ====
- Houston Stars

== Team tennis ==
=== World TeamTennis ===
- Austin Aces (2014–2015; relocated to become the Orange County Breakers)
- Houston E-Z Riders (1974)
- Houston Astro-Knots (1982–1983)
- Houston Wranglers (2005–2007)
- Texas Wild (2013–2014; relocated to become the California Dream and then folded after the 2015 season)
- Dallas Stars (1982–1983)
- San Antonio Racquets (1985–1994)

== Lacrosse ==
=== Major League Lacrosse ===
- Dallas Rattlers (2017–2020)

== See also ==
- List of defunct Florida sports teams
- List of defunct Georgia sports teams
- List of defunct Idaho sports teams
- List of defunct Mississippi sports teams
- List of defunct Ohio sports teams
- List of defunct Pennsylvania sports teams
- Sports in San Antonio

== Sources ==
- "Texas Almanac 2008–2009", The Dallas Morning News, c.2008
