= 1984 United Soccer League season =

United Soccer League
- Season: 1984
- Teams: 9
- Champions: Fort Lauderdale Sun
- Premiers: Oklahoma City Stampede
- Matches: 108
- Goals: 400 (3.7 per match)
- Top goalscorer: Jose Neto (22 goals)

The 1984 USL season was the United Soccer League's first and only full season.

== Background ==
The creation of Ingo Krieg, owner of the Jacksonville Tea Men, the United Soccer League formally announced its existence on February 1, 1984. The roots go back to Krieg's frustration over the direction taken by the second division American Soccer League, which was declining after rapid expansion to the west coast and midwestern states in the 1970s and some southern states in the 1980s had produced a string of short-lived franchises that were not able to make ends meet financially. Krieg joined with the owner of the Dallas Americans to found a new second division league called the United Soccer League that would try to operate within its means, feature primarily American players, play a mostly regional schedule to reduce travel expenses, and embrace a "grass roots" approach to growing the game in their towns. In late January 1984, the Detroit Express joined Jacksonville and Dallas in announcing their intention to move to the USL for the upcoming season. By late February, the USL had added the Oklahoma City Stampede (a reorganized and re-branded version of the ASL's Oklahoma City Slickers) as well as new organizations the Buffalo Storm, Fort Lauderdale Sun and New York Nationals. In the following weeks, the list of teams grew to include one last ASL defector, the Rochester Flash, another new club, the Houston Dynamos, and the Charlotte Gold (also a new franchise but one that employed many of the office staff and players from the recently folded Carolina Lightnin'). On March 18, 1984, the league announced a final line-up of nine teams in three divisions (Detroit ultimately dropped out due to the league not being sanctioned by the USSF). Dr. William Burfeind, who had resigned as ASL president in January, agreed to be the USL's first commissioner. The ASL, left with no active teams, quietly closed up shop.

== The season ==
The regular season ran from May 12 through August 15, and it went fairly smoothly for a recently founded league. Because the NASL was shedding franchises rapidly in the early 80's, a number of skilled and experienced professionals were available and were signed to rosters around the league. The standings reflected a relatively balanced and competitive group of clubs with no dominant or glaringly weak members. Though some franchises seemed to be on more stable footing than others, all nine teams completed their full 24-game schedules. Buffalo, Fort Lauderdale and Oklahoma City finished atop their respective divisions to earn postseason berths, and Houston defeated Dallas in a one-game wild card match to earn the fourth spot in the playoff semifinals.

The semifinal round began with considerable confusion. To determine teams' place in the standings, the league had adopted a points system that awarded five points for any win, two for a shootout loss (there were no ties), and up to three bonus points per game for regulation goals scored. In July, the league had announced a playoff format that would have the team with the most standings points face the team with the lowest points on one side of the bracket while the teams with the 2nd and 3rd most points would square off on the other. Teams therefore expected the semifinals matchups to be top seed Oklahoma City (127 points) vs. Buffalo (96 points) and Fort Lauderdale (122 points) vs. Houston (112 points), with Oklahoma City and Fort Lauderdale earning home field advantage for the three-game series. However, on Friday, August 17, just a few days before the first semifinal games, league officials held a conference call in which, after reviewing the minutes of an organizational meeting from April, they determined that their plan then had been for the top seed to face the wild card game winner regardless of points totals. The matchups were adjusted accordingly to be Oklahoma City vs. Houston and Fort Lauderdale vs. Buffalo. The Storm owner, Sal DeRosa, announced that all games between his team and Fort Lauderdale would take place in Florida because he did not feel optimistic about his club's ability to attract fans to a mid-week game with a 5:00 p.m. kick off time (due to the stadium having no lights) on short notice. The Sun made quick work of Buffalo, while Houston upset Oklahoma City. The best-of-three championship round was tightly contested. The first game had to be settled by a shootout, with Houston coming out on top at home. The Sun would rally two days later to win Game 2 in Fort Lauderdale by a score of 3–0, setting up a rubber match the next day. This game, too, would end in a tie and be decided in a shootout, but this time Fort Lauderdale prevailed to claim the first (and ultimately only) USL championship.

== League standings ==
=== Northern Division ===
| Pos | Team | Pld | W | T | L | GF | GA | GD | BP | Pts | PCT |
|---|---|---|---|---|---|---|---|---|---|---|---|
| 1 | Buffalo Storm | 24 | 11 | 0 | 13 | 48 | 41 | +7 | 41 | 96 | .313 |
| 2 | New York Nationals | 24 | 10 | 0 | 14 | 32 | 53 | −21 | 34 | 84 | .125 |
| 3 | Rochester Flash | 24 | 7 | 0 | 17 | 27 | 49 | −22 | 30 | 65 | .917 |

=== Southern Division ===
| Pos | Team | Pld | W | T | L | GF | GA | GD | BP | Pts | PCT |
|---|---|---|---|---|---|---|---|---|---|---|---|
| 1 | Fort Lauderdale Sun | 24 | 15 | 0 | 9 | 53 | 34 | +19 | 47 | 122 | .604 |
| 2 | Charlotte Gold | 24 | 11 | 0 | 13 | 48 | 59 | −11 | 50 | 105 | .500 |
| 3 | Jacksonville Tea Men | 24 | 11 | 0 | 13 | 46 | 50 | −4 | 43 | 98 | .354 |

=== Southwest Division ===
| Pos | Team | Pld | W | T | L | GF | GA | GD | BP | Pts | PCT |
|---|---|---|---|---|---|---|---|---|---|---|---|
| 1 | Oklahoma City Stampede | 24 | 15 | 0 | 9 | 55 | 42 | +13 | 52 | 127 | .708 |
| 2 | Houston Dynamos | 24 | 13 | 0 | 11 | 54 | 38 | +16 | 47 | 112 | .521 |
| 3 | Dallas Americans | 24 | 14 | 0 | 10 | 37 | 34 | +3 | 40 | 110 | .417 |

== Playoffs ==
=== Wild card ===
August 18, 1984

| Houston Dynamos (TX) | 2–1 | Dallas Americans (TX) |
|---|---|---|
| Jose Neto; Jose Neto 69' |

J.K. Butler Stadium, Houston, Texas

=== Semifinal 1 ===
August 22, 1984
7:35 CST

| Houston Dynamos (TX) | 3–1 (a.e.t.) | Oklahoma City Stampede (OK) |
|---|---|---|
| Walter Schlothauer 2'; Jose Neto 94' (pen.); Manny Neves 109' (pen.) | | 12', (red card) 110' Thompson Usiyan |

J.K. Butler Stadium, Houston, Texas
Attendance: 2,431
Referee: Bob Evans (USA)

August 24, 1984
7:35 CST

| Oklahoma City Stampede (OK) | 1–2 | Houston Dynamos (TX) |
|---|---|---|
| Kenny Killingsworth 13' | | (yellow card) 28' Manny Andruszewski; 55', 69' Jose Neto |

Taft Stadium, Oklahoma City
Referee: Bill Schofield (USA)

=== Semifinal 2 ===
August 23, 1984
8:00 EST

| Fort Lauderdale Sun (FL) | 3–0 | Buffalo Storm (NY) |
|---|---|---|
| Mark Schwartz 59:20' (Cubillas); Teófilo Cubillas 62:58', 76:59' (Crescitelli); Tom Groark (yellow card) 70:13'; John Lignos (yellow card) 76:59' |

Lockhart Stadium, Fort Lauderdale, Florida
Attendance: 3,186

August 25, 1984
8:00 EST

| Fort Lauderdale Sun (FL) | 5–1 | Buffalo Storm (NY) |
|---|---|---|
| Mark Schwartz 12:16', 17:49', 45:21'; Teófilo Cubillas 42:20'; Christiansen (yellow card) 52'; Dave Watson 56:53' | | 49:12', (yellow card) 52' Jerry Martello; (yellow card) 55' Corney |

Lockhart Stadium, Fort Lauderdale, Florida
Attendance: 4,502

== Final ==
August 29, 1984
8:30 CST

| Houston Dynamos (TX) | 1–1 (a.e.t.) | Fort Lauderdale Sun (FL) |
|---|---|---|
| Giulio Bernardi 105:30' | | (red card) 78' Tom Mulroy; (red card) 83' Asa Hartford; 98:12' Keith Weller (Christensen); (red card) David Irving |
Penalties
| Jose Neto (penalty scored); Walter Schlothauer (penalty scored); Giulio Bernardi (penalty scored); Lesh Shkreli (penalty scored) | 4–2 | (penalty missed) Mark Longwell; (penalty scored) Boris Bandov; (penalty missed) Ronil Dufrene; (penalty scored) Tom Groark |

J.K. Butler Stadium, Houston, Texas
Referee: Manuel Ortiz (USA)

August 31, 1984
8:00 EST

| Fort Lauderdale Sun (FL) | 3–0 | Houston Dynamos (TX) |
|---|---|---|
| Mark Schwartz (Crescitelli) 11:04'; Mark Schwartz (Cubillas) 22:43'; Teófilo Cubillas (Dufrene) 33:15' | Report |

Lockhart Stadium, Fort Lauderdale, Florida
Attendance: 4,250
Referee: Ron Miller

September 1, 1984
8:00 EST

| Fort Lauderdale Sun (FL) | 1–1 (a.e.t.) | Houston Dynamos (TX) |
|---|---|---|
| Dave Watson (Bandov) 41:08' | Report | 33:20' Jose Neto (Hilton) |
Penalties
| Teófilo Cubillas (penalty scored); Mark Schwartz (penalty missed); John Lignos (penalty missed); Tom Mulroy (penalty missed); Boris Bandov (penalty scored) ? (penalty missed) ? (penalty missed) ? (penalty missed); Dave Watson (penalty scored) | 3–2 | (penalty scored) Jose Neto; (penalty missed) ? (penalty missed) ? (penalty scored) Nathan Sacks; (penalty missed) Beto Dos Santos; (penalty missed) ? (penalty missed) ? (penalty missed) Manny Andruszewski; (penalty missed) Glenn Davis |

Lockhart Stadium, Fort Lauderdale, Florida
Attendance: 4,642

== Honors ==
- MVP: Jose Neto
- Leading goal scorer: Jose Neto
- Leading goalkeeper: Jim Tietjens
- Rookie of the Year: Mark Schwartz
- Coach of the Year: Gary Hindley
- Playoffs MVP: Mark Schwartz
- Executive of the Year: Peter Kane

== Points leaders ==
| Rank | Scorer | Club | Goals | Assists | Points |
|---|---|---|---|---|---|
| 1 | Jose Neto | Houston Dynamos | 22 | 8 | 30 |
| 2 | David Kemp | Oklahoma City Stampede | | | 28 |
| 3 | Thompson Usiyan | Oklahoma City Stampede | | | 26 |
| 4 | Mark Schwartz | Fort Lauderdale Sun | 13 | 6 | 19 |
| 5 | Carlos Salguero | Buffalo Storm | | | 19 |
| 6 | Tony Johnson | Houston Dynamos | 11 | 7 | 18 |
