= 1989 National Challenge Cup =

- Dewar Challenge Cup

Tournament details
- Country: United States

Final positions
- Champions: St. Petersburg Kickers
- Runners-up: New York Greek; American Atlas
- 1990 CONCACAF Champions' Cup: St. Petersburg Kickers; New York Greek; American Atlas

The 1989 National Challenge Cup was the 76th edition of the national soccer championship of the United States.

The St. Petersburg Kickers (FSSL) won the cup 2–1 against New York Greek American Atlas (HASL) at St. Louis Soccer Park in Fenton, Missouri.

== Open Cup Bracket ==
Home teams listed on top of bracket

Regionals; Apr 23-May 14
FSSL	St. Petersburg Kickers	5
GA	Genesis F.C.	0
LSSA	FC Dallas	1
TN	Nashville Blues	0
CSL	Chicago Eagles
WSA	Madison 56ers	2
BSSL	St.Louis Michelob	1
HASL	NY Greek AA	2
MA	Hellenic AA	0
VA	Washington Uprising	3
PA	Philadelphia International	2
PL	Exiles SC	2
IL	Valley Eagles	1
SJVSL	Fresno Oro	w/o
OR

Quarterfinals; May 14-Jun 4
FSSL	St. Petersburg Kickers	1
LSSA	FC Dallas	0
CSL	Chicago Eagles	0
BSSL	St.Louis Michelob	0
HASL	NY Greek AA	2
VA	Washington Uprising	1
PL	Exiles SC	4
SJVSL	Fresno Oro	3

Semifinals; June 18
FSSL	St. Petersburg Kickers	1
CSL	Chicago Eagles	1
HASL	NY Greek AA	4
PL	Exiles SC	1

Final; July 8
FSSL	St. Petersburg Kickers	2
HASL	NY Greek AA	1

== Final ==
July 8, 1989

St. Petersburg Kickers (FSSL)	2–1 (overtime)	NY Greek AA (HASL)
Garth Pollonais 46'; Gordon Singleton (Kevin Dixon) 119'	(Report)	John Lignos 80'

St. Louis Soccer Park; Fenton, Missouri

Tournament MVP: Joey Valenti

== Sources ==
- St. Petersburg Times
- St. Louis Post-Dispatch
- Newsday
- The Capital Times
- Wisconsin State Journal
- Daily Breeze
- Chicago Sun-Times
- Washington Post
- The Dallas Morning News
- Los Angeles Times
