= Henryk Apostel =

German-born Polish footballer and manager

Personal information
- Full name: Henryk Paweł Apostel
- Date of birth: 29 January 1941 (age 85)
- Place of birth: Beuthen, Germany
- Position: Striker

Senior career*
| Years | Team | Apps | (Gls) |
| 1959–1962 | Polonia Bytom | | |
| 1962–1968 | Legia Warsaw | | |
| 1969 | Chicago Eagles | | |
| 1970 | Legia Warsaw | | |
| 1971–1972 | Śląsk Wrocław | | |
| 1973–1974 | Chicago Eagles | | |
| 1974 | Polonia Warsaw | | |
| 1976 | Chicago Eagles | | |

International career
| 1962 | Poland | 1 | (0) |

Managerial career
- 1974–1977: Pogoń Siedlce
- 1977–1981: Poland U18
- 1983–1984: Poland U21
- 1984–1988: Śląsk Wrocław
- 1988: Lech Poznań
- 1988–1991: Chicago Eagles
- 1991–1993: Lech Poznań
- 1993: Górnik Zabrze
- 1994–1995: Poland
- 1996–1997: Wisła Kraków
- 1997: Górnik Zabrze
- 1998: Sur SC
- 1998–1999: KSZO Ostrowiec Świętokrzyski
Medal record
Men's football
Representing Poland (as manager)
UEFA European Under-18 Championship
| Runner-up | 1980 East Germany |
| Runner-up | 1981 West Germany |
- * Club domestic league appearances and goals

Henryk Paweł Apostel (born 29 January 1941) is a Polish former professional football manager and player.

He played for Polonia Bytom, Legia Warsaw, Chicago Eagles, Śląsk Wrocław and Polonia Warsaw. He capped once for Poland.

He managed Pogoń Siedlce, Poland U18, Poland U21, Śląsk Wrocław, Lech Poznań, Chicago Eagles, Górnik Zabrze, Poland, Wisła Kraków, Sur SC and KSZO Ostrowiec Świętokrzyski. Apostel managed Chicago Eagles to the 1990 U.S. Open Cup title.

== Honours ==
=== Player ===
Polonia Bytom

- Ekstraklasa: 1962

Legia Warsaw

- Ekstraklasa: 1968–69
- Polish Cup: 1963–64, 1965–66

=== Manager ===
Poland U18

- UEFA European Under-18 Championship runner-up: 1980, 1981

Śląsk Wrocław

- Polish Cup: 1986–87
- Polish Super Cup: 1987

Chicago Eagles

- U.S. Open Cup: 1990

Lech Poznań

- Ekstraklasa: 1991–92, 1992–93
- Polish Super Cup: 1992

Individual

- Ekstraklasa Hall of Fame: 2024
