= 1992 U.S. Open Cup =

- Dewar Challenge Cup

Tournament details
- Country: United States

Final positions
- Champions: San Jose Oaks
- Runners-up: Bridgeport Vasco da Gama
- 1993 CONCACAF Cup Winners Cup: San Jose Oaks

The 1992 United States Open Cup was the 79th edition of the soccer tournament to crown the national champion of the United States.

The San Jose Oaks (SFDML) won the cup 2–1 against Vasco da Gama (LISA) of Bridgeport, Connecticut in a match played at Kuntz Stadium in Indianapolis, Indiana.

== Bracket ==
Quarterfinals
SFDML | San Jose Oaks | 3
USASA | Kells Celtic | 0
USASA | Indianapolis Inferno | 2
USASA | Scott Gallacher | 0
LSSA | FC Dallas | 1
USISL | Dallas Rockets | 2
USASA | Fairfax Spartans | 0
LISA | Vasco da Gama | 1

Semifinals
SFDML | San Jose Oaks | 3
USASA | Indianapolis Inferno | 1
USISL | Dallas Rockets | 0
LISA | Vasco da Gama | 2

Final
SFDML | San Jose Oaks | 2
LISA | Vasco da Gama | 1

=== Regional semifinals ===
- I Bridgeport Vasco da Gama (CT) 2-1 New York Greek Americans (NY)
- I Fairfax Spartans (VA) 3-1 Philadelphia United German Hungarians (PA)
- II Indianapolis Inferno SC (IN) 5-2 Bavarian Leinenkugel SC (WI)
- II St. Louis Scott Gallacher (MO) 1-0 Chicago Italian-American Maroons (IL)
- III Dallas Rockets (TX) 5-0 Galveston Norte America (TX)
- III FC Dallas (TX) 1-0 St. Petersburg Kickers (FL)
- IV Kells Celtic (OR) 2-0 Flamengo (UT)
- IV San Jose Oaks (CA) 2-0 Santa Barbara (CA)

=== Regional Finals ===
- I Fairfax Spartans (VA) 0-1 Bridgeport Vasco da Gama (LISA)
- II Indianapolis Inferno SC (IN) 2-0 St.Louis Scott Gallacher (MO)
- III Dallas Rockets (USISL) 2-1 FC Dallas (LSSA)
- IV San Jose Oaks (SFDML) 3-0 Kells Celtic (OR)

=== Semifinals ===
- Bridgeport Vasco da Gama 2-0 Dallas Rockets
- San Jose Oaks 3-1 Indianapolis Inferno SC

=== Championship ===
July 11, 1992

| San Jose Oaks | 2–1 | Bridgeport Vasco da Gama |
|---|---|---|
| John Hughes; Dave Palic | (Report) | Sheldon Neal 80' |

Kuntz Stadium
Attendance: 2,500

Tournament MVP: John Hughes (San Jose)
