= Dynamos =

Dynamos may mean:

- The plural of dynamo

An association football club:

- Dynamos F.C. (South Africa), a South African association football club
- Dynamos F.C., a Zimbabwean association football club
- Lusaka Dynamos F.C., a Zambian association football club
- Power Dynamos F.C., a Zambian association football club
- Houston Dynamos, a defunct association football club based in Houston, Texas that was a member of the Lone Star Soccer Alliance.
