= Tony Johnson (soccer) =

American soccer player

Personal information
- Date of birth: 1961 (age 64–65)
- Place of birth: Erwin, North Carolina, U.S.
- Position: Forward

Youth career
- 1979–1982: UNC Tar Heels

Senior career*
Years	Team	Apps	(Gls)
1983	Pennsylvania Stoners	?	(6)
1984–1985	Houston Dynamos	22	(11)
1984	New York Arrows (indoor)	4	(0)
1984–1986	Columbus Capitals (indoor)	55	(50)
1986–1987	Memphis Storm (indoor)		
1988–1989	Houston Express (indoor)		
- * Club domestic league appearances and goals

Tony Johnson is an American retired soccer forward who played professionally in the American Soccer League, United Soccer League, American Indoor Soccer Association, Lone Star Soccer Alliance and the Southwest Indoor Soccer League.

Johnson began high school at Buies Creek High School before the school was consolidated into Harnett Central High School in 1977. He graduated in 1979 after finishing runner up for the North Carolina High School Soccer Player of the Year. He attended UNC Chapel Hill where he played on the men's soccer team from 1979 to 1982. He graduated in 1983 with a bachelor's degree in communications. In 2005, he was inducted into the North Carolina Soccer Hall of Fame. He began his professional career in 1983 with the Pennsylvania Stoners of the American Soccer League. He spent part of 1984 with the New York Arrows of Major Indoor Soccer League. In 1984, he played for the Houston Dynamos of the United Soccer League. He continued to play for the Dynamos in 1985, but the team played as an independent. He may have continued to play each summer with the Dynamos, as he is listed with the team when they defeated the Orlando Lions in 1987. By that time, the Dynamos were playing in the Lone Star Soccer Alliance. In the fall of 1984, he joined the Columbus Capitals of the American Indoor Soccer Association. He played for the Capitals through the 1985–1986 season after which the team folded. He then moved to the Memphis Storm. He played one last indoor season, when he was with the Houston Express for the 1988-89 Southwest Indoor Soccer League season.

Since retirement he has coached the Albion Hurricanes soccer club.
