= Amr Aly =

American soccer player

Personal information
- Full name: Amr O. Aly
- Date of birth: August 1, 1962 (age 64)
- Place of birth: Cairo, Egypt
- Position: Forward

College career
Years	Team	Apps	(Gls)
19xx–1984	Columbia Lions		

Senior career*
Years	Team	Apps	(Gls)
- New York Cosmos (indoor)
1985–1986	LA Lazers (indoor)	36	(6)
1986–1987	New York Express (indoor)	7	(2)
1989	New Jersey Eagles		
1990	Brooklyn Italians		

International career
1984–1985	United States	8	(0)
- * Club domestic league appearances and goals

Amr Aly (born August 1, 1962) (Arabic: عمر علي) is an American retired soccer forward. He attended Columbia University where he won the 1984 Hermann Trophy as the college player of the year.

He was a member of the 1984 U.S. Olympic Soccer Team and earned a total 8 caps, scoring no goals between 1984 and 1985. He was a member of the U.S. National Soccer Team 1980–1987, including the 1981 FIFA World Youth Championship in Australia. He scored two of the U.S. team's four goals in the 1980 China Great Wall Tournament. He appeared in one match at the 1983 Pan American Games and two matches at the 1987 Pan American Games, but these are not considered full internationals.

After graduating from Columbia, Amr played indoor soccer for the New York Cosmos, LA Lazers and New York Express for its single season in 1985–1986. He also played a single outdoor season in 1989 with the New Jersey Eagles of the American Professional Soccer League. In 1990, he played for the Brooklyn Italians in the Cosmopolitan Soccer League. The Italians went to the 1990 U.S. Open Cup final where it fell to the A.A.C. Eagles. Aly assisted on the lone Italians goal in the 2–1 loss.

Amr was inducted into the Columbia University Athletics Hall of Fame in 2008 along with the 1983 Columbia Soccer Team that was undefeated until the NCAA Division I final game; and in 2014 in his individual capacity.

He is currently a partner in the Intellectual Property practice at the Jenner & Block law firm. Before that, he was a partner at Mayer Brown.
