= Giulio Bernardi =

American soccer defender

Personal information
- Date of birth: July 6, 1960 (age 66)
- Place of birth: San Jose, California, United States
- Height: 5 ft 9 in (1.75 m)
- Position: Forward

Youth career
- 1978–1981: San Jose State

Senior career*
Years	Team	Apps	(Gls)
1982	Georgia Generals		
1983	Pennsylvania Stoners	?	(9)
1983–1984	Memphis Americans (indoor)	32	(15)
1984	Houston Dynamos		
1984–1985	Dallas Sidekicks (indoor)		
- * Club domestic league appearances and goals

Giulio Bernardi (born July 6, 1960, in San Jose, California) was an American soccer defender who spent two seasons in the American Soccer League, one in the United Soccer League and several in Major Indoor Soccer League.

Bernardi attended San Jose State where he played on the men's soccer team from 1978 to 1981. In 1981, he was a third team NSCAA All American. He is currently third on the Spartans all times goals list with 64 and third on the all-time assists list with 27. The New York Cosmos of the NASL drafted Bernardi in the first round of the 1982 draft, but did not sign him. Instead, he played the 1982 season with the Georgia Generals and 1983 season with the Pennsylvania Stoners, both of the American Soccer League. Giulio led the Stoners in scoring with nine goals as they fell to the Jacksonville Tea Men in the championship series. In the fall of 1983, he joined the Memphis Americans of Major Indoor Soccer League (MISL). In 1984, he played for the Houston Dynamos of the United Soccer League. The Dynamos went to the league championship before falling to the Fort Lauderdale Sun. In 1984, he signed with the Dallas Sidekicks of MISL.

Bernardi later entered the coaching field. In 2005, he was the head coach of the Mustang SC Pacific U14 Boys. In 2006, he was an assistant coach with Mustang Soccer of the Super Y-League.
