= Lynn Venable =

American soccer player

Personal information
- Date of birth: March 10, 1962 (age 64)
- Place of birth: Dallas, Texas, United States
- Height: 6 ft 2 in (1.88 m)
- Position: Goalkeeper

Youth career
- 1980–1983: North Texas Mean Green

Senior career*
Years	Team	Apps	(Gls)
1984	Dallas Mean Green		
1990	Indiana Kick (indoor)		
1990–1991	Dallas Sidekicks (indoor)	5	(0)
1992–1993	Dallas Rockets	29	(0)
1997	Arizona Sandsharks (indoor)		
- * Club domestic league appearances and goals

Lynn Venable is a retired American soccer goalkeeper who played professionally in the American Indoor Soccer Association, Major Indoor Soccer League, USISL and Continental Indoor Soccer League.

Venable graduated from Lloyd V. Berkner High School in Richardson, Texas. He attended North Texas State where he played on the men's soccer team from 1980 to 1983. In 1984, he Venable played for the Dallas Mean Green as they won the National Amateur Cup. On January 5, 1990, he signed with the Indiana Kick of the American Indoor Soccer Association. In the fall of 1990, he signed with the Dallas Sidekicks of the Major Indoor Soccer League. The Sidekicks released him at the end of the season. In 1991, he joined the Dallas Rockets of the USISL where he played for two seasons. In 1997, he played for the Arizona Sandsharks of the Continental Indoor Soccer League.
