= 1992 U.S. Open =

1992 U.S. Open may refer to:

- 1992 U.S. Open (golf), a major golf tournament
- 1992 US Open (tennis), a Grand Slam tennis tournament
- 1992 U.S. Open Cup, a soccer tournament
