= 1990 U.S. Open Cup =

- Dewar Challenge Cup

Tournament details
- Country: United States

Final positions
- Champions: A.A.C. Eagles
- Runners-up: Brooklyn Italians
- 1991 CONCACAF Champions' Cup: A.A.C. Eagles; Brooklyn Italians

The 1990 United States Open Cup is the 77th edition of the tournament to crown the national champion of the United States.

The A.A.C. Eagles (MSL) of Chicago won the cup 2–1 against the Brooklyn Italians (NESSL) at Kuntz Stadium in Indianapolis, Indiana.

== Bracket ==
Quarterfinals; May 13-Jun 3
USASA	Mike Duffy's	0
MSL	AAC Eagles	1
LSSA	FC Dallas	1
FSSL	St. Petersburg Kickers	0
CA	Los Angeles Zamora	2
SFSFL	Greek-American	1
USASA	German-Hungarian	3
NESSL	Brooklyn Italians	5

Semifinals; July 1
MSL	A.A.C. Eagles	3
LSSA	FC Dallas	0
CA	Los Angeles Zamora	0
NESSL	Brooklyn Italians	4

Final; July 28
MSL	A.A.C. Eagles	2
NESSL	Brooklyn Italians	1

=== Regional semifinals ===
- I Philadelphia United German-Hungarians (PA) 4-2 Acton Colonials (MA)
- I Brooklyn Italians (NY) 3-1 Beadling Blues (PA)
- II A.A.C. Eagles(IL) 1-0 Madison 56ers (WI)
- II Mike Duffy's (MO) 3-1 Craftsman Paint (MO)
- III FC Dallas(TX) 2-1 Houston Meadows (TX)
- III St. Petersburg Kickers (FL) 4-1 Atlanta Datagraphic (GA)
- IV San Francisco Greek-American (CA) 1-0 Washington Fatigues (WA)
- IV Los Angeles Zamora (CA) 2-1 OT Colorado Comets (CO)

=== Regional Finals ===
- I United German-Hungarian USASA 3-5 Brooklyn Italians NESSL
- II Mike Duffy's USASA 0-1 A.A.C. Eagles MSL
- III FC Dallas LSSA 1-0 St. Petersburg Kickers FSSL
- IV Los Angeles Zamora CA 2-1 OT Greek-American SFSFL

=== National semifinals ===
- Los Angeles Zamora CA 0-4 OT Brooklyn Italians NESSL
- A.A.C. Eagles MSL 3-0 FC Dallas LSSA

== Championship ==
July 28, 1990

A.A.C. Eagles	2–1	Brooklyn Italians
57' Janusz Kieca; 89' Piotr Modrzejewski	(Report)	64' Jean Yves (Amr Aly)

Kuntz Stadium
Indianapolis, Indiana
Attendance: 3116
