= Tom Mulroy =

American soccer executive (born 1956)

Tommy Mulroy
Personal information
- Date of birth: September 28, 1956 (age 70)
- Place of birth: Bronx, United States
- Position: Defender

Youth career
- Blau-Weiss Gottschee
- Clarktown Sports Club
- 1974–1975: Ulster County Community College

Senior career*
Years	Team	Apps	(Gls)
1976	Miami Toros	12	(1)
1977	Fort Lauderdale Strikers (indoor)	1	(1)
1977	Cleveland Cobras	19	(3)
1978	New York Eagles	22	(6)
1978–1979	Pittsburgh Spirit (indoor)	23	(10)
1979	Cleveland Cobras	18	(2)
1979–1981	Hartford Hellions (indoor)	53	(10)
1981	New York Eagles		
1983–1984	New York Arrows (indoor)	25	(8)
1983-1984	Fort Lauderdale Sun		
1986–1987	New York Express (indoor)	6	(0)
1987	Louisville Thunder (indoor)		
- * Club domestic league appearances and goals

Thomas "Soccer Tom" Mulroy is a soccer executive, industry entrepreneur, and retired American professional soccer defender who played for 13 years in the North American Soccer League, Major Indoor Soccer League, United Soccer League and American Indoor Soccer Association. Tom served as an official spokesperson for the 1994 FIFA World Cup.

== Player ==
Mulroy grew up in New York playing in the Blau-Weiss Gottschee youth system. He attended Ulster County Community College where he was a 1974 and 1975 National Junior College All American. In 1993, he was inducted into the NJCAA Hall of Fame. In 1976, he played for the Miami Toros of the North American Soccer League. In 1977 Mulroy scored a goal for the, newly relocated from Miami, Fort Lauderdale Strikers in a February indoor match before moving on to become a defensive midfielder for the Cleveland Cobras of the American Soccer League. In 1978, he went to the ASL's New York Eagles for one season before returning to the Cobras in 1979. During the winter of 1978–1979, he played for the Pittsburgh Spirit during the inaugural season of the Major Indoor Soccer League. He was a second team All-Star. He later played for the Hartford Hellions and New York Arrows of MISL. In 1982, he tried out with the Fort Lauderdale Strikers, but if he was signed he played no first team games. In 1984, he played for the Fort Lauderdale Sun in the United Soccer League. Although he normally played as a defender, on June 3, 1984, he played goalkeeper for the Sun in a 4–2 win over the Buffalo Storm after the Jim Tietjens the Suns' only goalkeeper went down injured. In September 1986, he signed with the short lived New York Express of MISL. The team folded during the season. He then finished the season with the Louisville Thunder of the American Indoor Soccer Association and retired.

== World record ==
In 1978, Mulroy broke the world record for juggling a soccer ball. He recorded 12,295 touches over the course of more than 2 hours in a 20'x25' observation deck atop the Empire State Building.

== Post-playing career ==
Since retirement he founded Soccer Marketing & Promotions, Inc. and created Se Habla Futbol. He served on the Executive Committee for the 1996 Olympic Soccer Games and was named Official Spokesperson for World Cup USA '94.

Mulroy was hired by Traffic Sports USA to serve as President of Fort Lauderdale Strikers of the North American Soccer League in 2012. Under Mulroy's leadership, the Strikers strengthened bonds within the local community and saw increased attendance and community engagement. Mulroy left the club in November 2014 citing "philosophical differences" with new owners of the franchise, a group of Brazilian investors who later abandoned the historic club.

Tom Mulroy is currently Technical Director at South Florida club Weston Select.
