= Stephen Myers =

Stephen or Steven Myers may refer to:

- Stephen Myers (engineer)
- Stephen Myers (abolitionist)
- Steven Myers (CEO)
- Steven Myers (politician)
- Steve Myers, American soccer goalkeeper
