= 1986–87 Southwest Indoor Soccer League season =

The 1986–87 Southwest Indoor Soccer League season was the inaugural season of the United Soccer Leagues.

== League standings ==
Pos	Team	Pld	W	L	GF	GA	GD	BP	Pts
1	Garland Genesis	16	14	2	31	17	+14	1	57
2	Lubbock Lazers	15	7	8	25	21	+4	16	44
3	Oklahoma City Warriors	16	8	8	69	70	−1	10	42
4	Albuquerque Outlaws	11	2	9	14	29	−15	1	9
5	Amarillo Challengers	4	2	2	12	14	−2	0	8

== Semifinal ==
- The Lubbock Lazers defeated the Oklahoma City Warriors in a best of 3 series.

== Final ==
1987

Garland Genesis (TX)	7–2	Lubbock Lazers (TX)

Fair Park Coliseum
Lubbock, Texas

== Honors ==
- Most Valuable Player: Greg Nichols
- Leading scorer: Greg Nichols
- Assist Leader: Danny Perge
- Goalkeeper of the Year: Steve Myers
- Rookie of the Year: Ty Kongdara
- Coach of the Year: Chico Villar
