= Greg Nichols =

American soccer player

Personal information
- Full name: Gregory Nichols
- Date of birth: June 24, 1965 (age 61)
- Place of birth: Liberal, Kansas, U.S.
- Height: 6 ft 0 in (1.83 m)
- Positions: Forward; defender

College career
Years	Team	Apps	(Gls)
1982–1985	Lewis & Clark Pioneers		

Senior career*
Years	Team	Apps	(Gls)
1986–1987	Garland Genesis (indoor)		(47)
1987–1990	Canton Invaders (indoor)	77	(19)
1990–1991	Dallas Sidekicks (indoor)	6	(0)
1991	Dallas Mean Green		(7)
1991–	Dallas Rockets (indoor)		
- * Club domestic league appearances and goals

Greg Nichols is an American retired soccer defender who played professionally in the American Indoor Soccer Association and Major Indoor Soccer League. He was the 1987 MVP of the Southwest Indoor Soccer League.

From 1982 to 1985, Nichols played collegiate soccer at Lewis & Clark College in Portland, Oregon. In 1986, Nichols signed with the Garland Genesis of the Southwest Indoor Soccer League. This was the first season for both he league and for Garland. Nichols went on to score 47 goals and add 15 assists as the Genesis won the league championship. Nichols was named league MVP. In 1987, Nichols moved to the Canton Invaders of the American Indoor Soccer Association. In Nichols' three seasons with the Invaders, the team won three consecutive AISA championships. In 1990, he signed with the Dallas Sidekicks of the Major Indoor Soccer League where he spent one season. Nichols remained in Dallas after being released by the Sidekicks and played for Dallas Mean Green in the Lone Star Soccer Alliance during the summer of 1991. He was second on the league's points list. In the fall of 1991, he returned to the SISL, this time with the Dallas Rockets.

In 2006, Nichols was inducted into the USL Hall of Fame.
