= Lakewood Arena =

Multi-purpose arena in Bradenton, Florida

Lakewood Arena was a planned 7,400-seat multi-purpose arena in Bradenton, Florida. While preliminary construction had been done, developer DVA Sports had financial and technical problems preventing the completion of the arena. The arena was to be home to the Gulf Coast Swords ECHL ice hockey team. However, due to the years of delays, including an almost 2-year hiatus in construction, the ECHL terminated the Swords franchise in September 2006. As of November 2008, only 3 walls were standing and the property was foreclosed. DVA Sports managed to have foreclosure auctions postponed twice by making interest payments on their debt until 2009.

== New Owners ==
The uncompleted building was sold April 21, 2009 at foreclosure auction to Schroeder-Manatee Ranch, one of the property's lien holders. SMR, who was the only bidder, paid $100. The current structure was torn down in November 2009.
