= List of defunct Idaho sports teams =

Idaho Sports teams, Defunct, list

This is a list of former sports teams from the US state of Idaho.

== Baseball ==
Twin Falls, Idaho, had minor league baseball teams playing in the Pioneer League from 1939 to 1969.

=== Minor League ===
==== Northwest League ====
- Boise A's (1975, 1976)
- Boise Buckskins (1978)
- Lewiston Broncs (1955–74, and WIL: 1952–54)

==== Pioneer League ====
- Boise Braves (1955–63)
- Boise Pilots (1939–42, 1946–51, 1954)
- Boise Yankees (1952, 1953)
- Caldwell Cubs (1967–72), Treasure Valley Cubs (1964–66)
- Idaho Falls Padres (2000–03), were also known as the Idaho Falls Braves (1993–99), Idaho Falls Gems (1992), Idaho Falls Braves (1986–1991, Idaho Falls Nuggets (1985), Idaho Falls A's (1982–1984), Idaho Falls Angels (1978–1981), they are now called the Idaho Falls Chukars
- Lewiston Indians (1939)
- Magic Valley Cowboys, formerly known as the Twin Falls Cowboys, played between 1939 and 1969. From 1946 to 1949, it was affiliated with the New York Yankees, and from 1961 to 1964, it was affiliated with the Philadelphia Phillies.
- Pocatello Athletics
- Pocatello Cardinals
- Pocatello Chiefs (1962–65), Pocatello Bannocks (1952–60, 1961), Pocatello Giants (1960)
- Pocatello Gems
- Pocatello Pioneers
- Pocatello Posse

=== NCAA ===
- Boise State Broncos (1971–1980, 2020)
- Idaho Vandals (190x–1980)
- Idaho State Bengals (195x–1974)

== Basketball ==
=== Continental Basketball Association ===
- Idaho Stampede (1997–2006)

=== NBA Development League ===
- Idaho Stampede (2006–16)

== Football ==
=== Indoor Professional Football League ===
- Idaho Stallions (1999–2001)

== Soccer ==
=== National Premier Soccer League ===
- Idaho Wolves (2004)

== Tennis ==
=== World TeamTennis ===
- Idaho Sneakers (1994-2000)

== See also ==
- List of defunct Florida sports teams
- List of defunct Georgia sports teams
- List of defunct Mississippi sports teams
- List of defunct Ohio sports teams
- List of defunct Pennsylvania sports teams
