= List of defunct Ohio sports teams =

Sports

This is a list of former sports teams from the US state of Ohio:

== Baseball ==
=== Major League Baseball ===
- Cincinnati Red Stockings were the first professional baseball club founded in 1866 and disbanded following the 1870 season. During the offseason, core members such as brothers Harry & George Wright moved to Boston to help start a newly formed baseball club called the Boston Red Stockings, eventually becoming known as the Boston Braves; the team moved to Milwaukee and became the Milwaukee Braves, and finally moved to Atlanta and are now the Atlanta Braves.
- Cleveland Spiders

=== Frontier League ===
- Ohio Valley Redcoats (2005 split season between Marietta, Lorain and Lafayette, Indiana. Original Ohio Valley team from 1993 to 1998 was based in Parkersburg, West Virginia)
- Canton Crocodiles (1997–2001, sold to group from Washington, Pennsylvania and are now the Washington Wild Things)
- Canton Coyotes (2002)
- Newark Buffalos/Bison (1994–1995)
- Chillicothe Paints (1994–2008, team name is used as wood-bat league collegiate team)
- Portsmouth Explorers (1993–1995)
- Zanesville Greys (1993–1996, moved to Canton for 1997 season)
- Lancaster Scouts (1993–1995)

=== Negro National League ===
- Cincinnati Cubans
- Cleveland Browns
- Cleveland Cubs
- Columbus Elite Giants (would move to Washington, D.C. and become the Washington Elite Giants, and later move to Baltimore and become the Baltimore Elite Giants for the rest of the team's existence)
- Cleveland Elites
- Cleveland Hornets
- Cleveland Tate Stars
- Columbus Buckeyes
- Dayton Marcos
- Toledo Tigers

=== Negro National League (1933–1948) ===
- Cleveland Red Sox

=== National Colored Base Ball League ===
- Cincinnati Browns

=== Negro American League ===
- Cincinnati Buckeyes/Cleveland Buckeyes (would move to Louisville, Kentucky and become the Louisville Buckeyes for the rest of the team's existence)
- Cincinnati Clowns (would move to Indianapolis, Indiana and become the Indianapolis Clowns for the rest of the team's existence)
- Cincinnati Tigers

=== American Association (20th Century) ===
- Columbus Senators/Columbus Red Birds (moved to Omaha, Nebraska and became the Omaha Cardinals for the rest of the team's existence)
- Toledo Mud Hens (first) (moved to Wichita, Kansas and became the Wichita Braves, would move again to Fort Worth, Texas and become the Fort Worth Cats, and move again to Dallas, Texas and become the Dallas Rangers for the rest of the team's existence)
- Toledo Mud Hens (second) (moved to Charleston, West Virginia and became the Charleston Senators for the rest of the team's existence)

=== American Association ===
- Cincinnati Kelly's Killers
- Columbus Buckeyes (AA)
- Columbus Solons
- Toledo Blue Stockings
- Toledo Maumees

=== Union Association ===
- Cincinnati Outlaw Reds

=== Players' League ===
- Cleveland Infants

=== National Association of Professional Base Ball Players ===
- Cleveland Forest Citys

=== International Association ===
- Columbus Buckeyes (minor league)

== Basketball ==
=== National Basketball Association ===
- Cincinnati Royals (moved to Kansas City, Missouri and became the Kansas City Kings, would move again to Sacramento, California and are now the Sacramento Kings)
- Cleveland Rebels

=== World Basketball League ===
- Youngstown Pride (1987–1992) (ceased operations when the WBL folded in 1992)

=== International Basketball Association ===
- Youngstown Hawks (1999–2000) (franchise was moved to Saskatoon, Saskatchewan, Canada during the 1999–2000 campaign)

=== American Basketball League ===
- Columbus Quest (1996–1998)

=== Continental Basketball Association ===
- Columbus Horizon (1991–1994)

=== International Basketball League ===
- Akron Lightning

=== International Basketball League (1998–2001) ===
- Cincinnati Stuff

=== National Basketball League ===
- Akron Firestone Non-Skids
- Akron Wingfoots
- Cincinnati Comellos
- Cleveland Brassmen
- Cleveland Transfers
- Cleveland White Horses
- Columbus Athletic Supply
- Dayton Metropolitans
- Dayton Rens
- Toledo Chevrolets
- Toledo Jeeps

=== American Basketball League ===
- Cleveland Rosenblums
- Toledo Red Man Tobaccos

=== American Basketball League (1961–1963) ===
- Cleveland Pipers

=== Women's National Basketball Association ===
- Cleveland Rockers

=== Women's Professional Basketball League ===
- Dayton Rockettes

=== American Basketball League ===
- Columbus Quest

== Football ==
=== National Football League ===
- Cleveland Rams (moved to Los Angeles and became the Los Angeles Rams, moved to St. Louis and became the St. Louis Rams before returning to Los Angeles and once again becoming the Los Angeles Rams)
- Portsmouth Spartans (moved to Detroit in 1934 and became the Detroit Lions)
- Akron Pros (defunct)
- Canton Bulldogs/Cleveland Bulldogs/Cleveland Indians (NFL) (defunct)
- Cincinnati Reds (NFL) (defunct)
- Cleveland Tigers/Cleveland Indians (NFL) (defunct)
- Cincinnati Celts (defunct)
- Columbus (NFL) (Panhandles/Tigers) (defunct)
- Dayton Triangles (defunct)
- Oorang Indians (defunct)
- Toledo Maroons (moved to Kenosha, Wisconsin and became the Kenosha Maroons for the rest of the team's existence)

=== Arena Football League ===
- Cincinnati Rockers (1992–1993)
- Columbus Destroyers (2004–2008)
- Columbus Thunderbolts (1991)
- Cleveland Thunderbolts (1992–1994)
- Cleveland Gladiators (2008-2019

=== National Indoor Football League ===
- Dayton Warbirds

=== Continental Football League ===
- Akron Vulcans

=== Continental Indoor Football League ===
- Steubenville Stampede (2005–2007)
- Summit County Rumble (2006–2007)

=== Eastern Indoor Football League ===
- Mahoning Valley HitMen
- Northeast Ohio Panthers

=== Pre-NFL Teams ===
- Elyria Athletics
- Ironton Tanks
- Massillon Tigers
- Shelby Blues
- Youngstown Patricians

=== World League of American Football ===
- Ohio Glory

== Hockey ==
=== National Hockey League ===
- Cleveland Barons (NHL) (merged with the Minnesota North Stars and later moved to Dallas to become the Dallas Stars)

=== All-American Hockey League ===
- Dayton Jets (1985–87), (formed from the Findlay Warriors, eventually merged to form the Miami Valley Sabres in 1987)
- Miami Valley Sabres (1987–89), (ceased operations after the league folded in the summer of 1989)
- Troy Sabres (1982–87), (merged with the Dayton Jets to form the Miami Valley Sabres in 1987)

=== American Hockey League ===
- Cleveland Barons (1937–73) (moved to Jacksonville, Florida and become the Jacksonville Barons for the rest of the team's existence)
- Cleveland Barons (2001–06) (moved to Worcester, Massachusetts to become the Worcester Sharks before moving to San Jose, California where they are now the San Jose Barracuda)

=== Central Hockey League ===
- Youngstown SteelHounds

=== ECHL ===
- Cincinnati Cyclones (previously a member of the IHL)
- Columbus Chill (moved to Reading, Pennsylvania and are now the Reading Royals)
- Toledo Storm (defunct)
- Dayton Bombers

=== International Hockey League ===
- Akron Americans (defunct)
- Dayton Gems (original) (merged with the Milwaukee Admirals, now in the American Hockey League)
- Cleveland Falcons/Indians (transferred to the American Hockey League and became the Cleveland Barons (1937–73); eventually moved to Jacksonville, Florida and became the Jacksonville Barons for the rest of the team's existence)
- Cleveland Lumberjacks (1992–2001) (formerly the Muskegon Lumberjacks (1984–92); franchise ceased operations when the IHL folded in 2001)
- Dayton Gems (2009–2012) (second) (defunct)
- Cincinnati Cyclones (went defunct, moved to the ECHL)
- Cincinnati Mohawks (defunct)
- Dayton Owls (moved to Grand Rapids, Michigan and became the Grand Rapids Owls for the rest of the team's existence)
- Columbus Owls (defunct)
- Marion Barons (defunct)
- Toledo Blades/Toledo Hornets/Toledo Goaldiggers (defunct)
- Toledo Mercurys (defunct)
- Troy Bruins (defunct)

=== United Hockey League/Colonial Hockey League ===
- Columbus Stars (defunct)
- Dayton Ice Bandits (defunct)
- Ohio Gears/Arctic Xpress of Massillon/Canton Ice Patrol. (defunct)

=== World Hockey Association ===
- Cincinnati Stingers (defunct)
- Cleveland Crusaders (moved to Saint Paul, Minnesota and became the Minnesota Fighting Saints for the rest of the team's existence)
- Dayton Arrows (moved to Houston, Texas and became the Houston Aeros for the rest of the team's existence)

=== North Eastern Hockey League ===
- Findlay Freedom (defunct)

=== Continental Elite Hockey League ===
- Daytona Gems (defunct)
- Toledo Ice Diggers (defunct)
- Toledo Wolf Pack (defunct)

=== International Independent Hockey League ===
- Ohio Valley Ice Cats (defunct)

=== Federal Hockey League ===
- Mentor Ice Breakers

== Soccer ==
=== Major Indoor Soccer League ===
- Cincinnati Kids
- Cleveland Crunch
- Cleveland Force

=== United States Interregional Soccer League ===
- Cincinnati Cheetahs
- Ohio Xoggz / Columbus Xoggz
- Toledo Twisters

=== USL League Two ===
Known as the Premier Development League before 2019

- Columbus Shooting Stars

=== American Soccer League ===
- Cincinnati Comets
- Cleveland Stars/Cleveland Cobras
- Columbus Magic

=== North American Soccer League ===
- Cleveland Stokers

=== National Professional Soccer League ===
- Canton Invaders / Columbus Invaders
- Cincinnati Silverbacks
- Columbus Capitals
- Dayton Dynamo
- Toledo Pride

== Softball ==
=== Men's Professional Softball Leagues ===
- Cincinnati Rivermen
- Cincinnati Suds
- Cleveland Competitors
- Cleveland Jaybirds
- Columbus All-Americans

=== National Pro Fastpitch ===
- Akron Racers

== Tennis ==
=== World TeamTennis ===
- Cleveland Nets (moved to New Orleans, Louisiana and became the New Orleans Nets for the rest of the team's existence)

== Ultimate Disc ==
=== American Ultimate Disc League ===
- Columbus Cranes (2012)

== See also ==
- List of defunct Florida sports teams
- List of defunct Georgia sports teams
- List of defunct Idaho sports teams
- List of defunct Mississippi sports teams
- List of defunct Pennsylvania sports teams
- List of defunct Texas sports teams
