= Asa Hartford =

Scottish footballer and coach

Personal information
- Full name: Richard Asa Hartford
- Date of birth: 24 October 1950 (age 76)
- Place of birth: Clydebank, Scotland
- Height: 5 ft 7 in (1.70 m)
- Position: Midfielder

Youth career
- Drumchapel Amateurs

Senior career*
Years	Team	Apps	(Gls)
1967–1974	West Bromwich Albion	214	(18)
1974–1979	Manchester City	185	(22)
1979	Nottingham Forest	3	(0)
1979–1981	Everton	81	(6)
1981–1984	Manchester City	75	(7)
1984	Fort Lauderdale Sun (Note: Asa Hartford played in at least 5 official matches for Fort Lauderdale Sun in 1984 United Soccer League, in which he scored 1 goal.)	5+	(1+)
1984–1985	Norwich City	28	(2)
1985–1987	Bolton Wanderers	81	(8)
1987–1989	Stockport County	45	(0)
1989	Oldham Athletic	7	(0)
1989–1991	Shrewsbury Town	25	(0)
Total		749+	(64+)

International career
1970–1973	Scotland U23	5	(0)
1972–1982	Scotland	50	(5)
1977	Scotland U21	1	(0)

Managerial career
- 1985–1987: Bolton Wanderers (player-coach)
- 1987–1989: Stockport County
- 1990–1991: Shrewsbury Town
- 1991: Boston United
- 1993: Stoke City (caretaker manager)
- 1996–2005: Manchester City (asst/caretaker manager)
- 2007–2008: Macclesfield Town (assistant manager)
- * Club domestic league appearances and goals

Richard Asa Hartford (born 24 October 1950) is a Scottish former football player and coach. He started his professional career with West Bromwich Albion. His early progress led to a proposed transfer to Leeds United in November 1971, but this collapsed when a medical examination discovered a heart condition. Hartford instead moved to Manchester City in 1974. He helped City win the 1976 League Cup Final. After a brief spell with Nottingham Forest, Hartford moved to Everton in 1979 and then had a second spell with Manchester City. After playing for Fort Lauderdale Sun, Hartford joined Norwich City. His shot resulted in the only goal of the 1985 League Cup Final. He is also one of the few footballers to have made over 1,000 competitive appearances.

Hartford was also a regular in the Scotland national team, earning 50 caps between 1972 and 1982. He was selected for the Scotland squads in the 1978 and 1982 World Cups. Towards the end of his playing career, Hartford became a coach. He was the player/manager of Stockport County and Shrewsbury Town. Since retiring as a player, Hartford has worked in a variety of coaching and scouting roles.

== Club career ==
Hartford first played for Drumchapel Amateurs in Glasgow, but began his professional career at West Bromwich Albion in 1967. During his time with West Brom, the team won the 1968 FA Cup Final (although he did not play in the final), were beaten FA Cup semi-finalists in 1969 and reached the League Cup final in 1970.

A proposed transfer to Don Revie's Leeds United in November 1971 was cancelled, when the Leeds doctor found that Hartford had a hole-in-the-heart condition during a pre-transfer medical examination. He was eventually transfer listed by then West Brom coach Don Howe, alongside favourites Len Cantello and Jeff Astle, in April 1974. Hartford moved on to Manchester City for £210,000, making his debut for City in a 4–0 victory against West Ham. He helped City win the 1976 League Cup Final.

At the beginning of the 1979–80 season he was transferred to Brian Clough's Nottingham Forest (to replace Archie Gemmill) for £500,000, only to be sold on to Everton for £400,000 after just three games with Forest. In October 1981 John Bond took him back to Manchester City for £375,000. His second stint with City was less successful, as he suffered an ankle injury and the club were relegated in 1983. Hartford left City in 1984 and signed for American club Fort Lauderdale Sun.

He returned to English football soon afterwards with Norwich City. In the 1985 League Cup Final, Hartford's shot was deflected by Sunderland's Gordon Chisholm for the only goal of the match. They were relegated in the same season.

He then had stints with Bolton Wanderers and Oldham Athletic, and then took up coaching/managerial roles with Stockport County and Shrewsbury Town.

== International career ==
Hartford made his full international debut for Scotland on 26 April 1972, in a friendly match with Peru. Hartford made six appearances for Scotland during 1972, but was not selected again until October 1975.

He became a regular in the international side in 1977, as Scotland defeated Czechoslovakia and Wales to qualify for the 1978 World Cup in Argentina. Brian Glanville, in his frequently updated The Story of the World Cup, wrote "The Scots had an abundance of fine midfield players at a time when most other countries looked for them desperately; Bruce Rioch, Don Masson, Asa Hartford, Archie Gemmill, Lou Macari, Graeme Souness". Hartford played in all Scotland games in Argentina. His side lost 3–1 to Peru, drew 1–1 with Iran and defeated eventual runners-up Netherlands 3–2, which meant that Ally MacLeod's team exited the competition after the first round.

Hartford's international career came to an end after the 1982 World Cup, where he recorded his 50th and final cap for Scotland in the game against Brazil. This appearance secured Hartford a place on the national team's roll of honour, as the 8th player to make 50 appearances for Scotland. Hartford did not appear in any other matches at the 1982 World Cup, as Scotland were again eliminated after the group stage.

== Coaching and managerial career ==
Hartford was player/manager at Stockport County (1987–89) and Shrewsbury Town (1990–91) before his retirement as a player. He subsequently joined ex-international teammates Kenny Dalglish (at Blackburn Rovers), Joe Jordan and Lou Macari (at Stoke City where he spent four matches as caretaker manager) in various coaching/managerial roles. He became assistant manager at Manchester City in 1995, working with Alan Ball. He was caretaker manager in September 1996, after Ball left, but he did not express any interest in becoming manager on a permanent basis. He stayed with City for several years as their reserve team coach, until Stuart Pearce brought in his own coaching staff in May 2005.

Hartford became a first team coach with Blackpool in December 2005, but left the club in May 2006. On 29 June 2007 it was announced that he had been appointed assistant manager at Macclesfield Town but both he and Ian Brightwell were sacked in February 2008 to be replaced by Keith Alexander. In April 2008 he was given a role with Accrington Stanley coaching the junior teams and the reserves, but was made redundant from this role in October 2011. He subsequently worked for Birmingham City as a scout.

== Career statistics ==
=== As a player ===
Appearances and goals by club, season and competition
Club	Season	League			FA Cup		League Cup		Other^{[A]}		Total	
Club	Season	Division	Apps	Goals	Apps	Goals	Apps	Goals	Apps	Goals	Apps	Goals
West Bromwich Albion	1967–68	First Division	6	1	0	0	0	0	0	0	6	1
West Bromwich Albion	1968–69	First Division	26	7	4	1	0	0	7	3	37	11
West Bromwich Albion	1969–70	First Division	35	1	1	0	7	0	4	0	47	1
West Bromwich Albion	1970–71	First Division	34	2	4	0	2	1	5	0	45	3
West Bromwich Albion	1971–72	First Division	39	1	1	0	1	0	3	0	44	1
West Bromwich Albion	1972–73	First Division	41	3	5	1	3	1	4	1	53	6
West Bromwich Albion	1973–74	Second Division	33	3	4	0	2	0	0	0	39	3
West Bromwich Albion	1974–75	Second Division	0	0	0	0	0	0	3	0	3	0
West Bromwich Albion	Total		214	18	19	2	15	2	26	4	274	26
Manchester City	1974–75	First Division	30	2	1	0	1	0	0	0	32	2
Manchester City	1975–76	First Division	39	9	2	1	9	2	3	0	53	12
Manchester City	1976–77	First Division	40	4	4	0	1	0	2	0	47	5
Manchester City	1977–78	First Division	37	4	2	0	5	0	2	0	46	4
Manchester City	1978–79	First Division	39	3	3	0	5	0	8	2	55	5
Manchester City	Total		185	22	12	1	21	2	15	2	233	27
Nottingham Forest	1979–80	First Division	3	0	0	0	0	0	0	0	3	0
Everton	1979–80	First Division	35	1	5	1	3	0	0	0	43	2
Everton	1980–81	First Division	39	5	6	0	3	0	0	0	48	5
Everton	1981–82	First Division	7	0	0	0	0	0	0	0	7	0
Everton	Total		81	6	11	1	6	0	0	0	98	7
Manchester City	1981–82	First Division	30	3	2	0	4	1	0	0	36	4
Manchester City	1982–83	First Division	38	3	3	1	4	0	0	0	45	4
Manchester City	1983–84	Second Division	7	1	0	0	0	0	0	0	7	1
Manchester City	Total		75	7	5	1	8	1	0	0	88	9
Norwich City	1984–85	First Division	28	2	4	0	8	3	0	0	40	5
Bolton Wanderers	1985–86	Third Division	46	5	1	0	4	1	7	1	58	7
Bolton Wanderers	1986–87	Third Division	35	3	5	0	0	0	3	0	43	3
Bolton Wanderers	Total		81	8	6	0	4	1	10	1	101	10
Stockport County	1987–88	Fourth Division	31	0	4	0	1	0	1	0	37	0
Stockport County	1988–89	Fourth Division	14	0	0	0	0	0	1	0	15	0
Stockport County	Total		45	0	4	0	1	0	2	0	52	0
Oldham Athletic	1988–89	Second Division	7	0	0	0	0	0	0	0	7	0
Shrewsbury Town	1989–90	Third Division	17	0	1	0	1	0	1	0	20	0
Shrewsbury Town	1990–91	Third Division	8	0	0	0	2	0	0	0	10	0
Shrewsbury Town	Total		25	0	1	0	3	0	1	0	30	0
Career Total			744	63	62	5	66	9	54	7	926	84

A. The "Other" column constitutes appearances and goals in the Anglo-Italian Cup, Anglo-Scottish Cup, FA Charity Shield, Football League Trophy, Football League play-offs Texaco Cup, UEFA Cup, UEFA Cup Winners' Cup, Watney Cup.

=== As a manager ===
Managerial record by team and tenure
Team	From	To	Record				
Team	From	To	P	W	D	L	Win %
Stockport County	12 June 1987	1 April 1989	93	24	34	35	25.8
Shrewsbury Town	1 January 1990	17 January 1991	55	16	19	20	29.1
Stoke City	10 September 1994	29 September 1994	4	3	0	1	75.0
Total			152	43	53	56	28.3

== Honours ==
West Bromwich Albion

- Football League Cup runner-up: 1969–70

Manchester City

- Football League Cup: 1975–76

Norwich City

- Football League Cup: 1984–85

Bolton Wanderers

- Associate Members' Cup runner-up: 1985–86

Individual

- Scotland national football team roll of honour: 1982
- PFA Team of the Year: 1986–87 Third Division

== See also ==
- List of footballers in England by number of league appearances
- List of men's footballers with the most official appearances
- List of Scotland national football team captains
