= Tupelo T-Rex =

- City: Tupelo, Mississippi
- League: WPHL
- Division: Southeast Division
- Operated: 1998–2001
- Home arena: BancorpSouth Center
- Colors: Green, white, yellow, purple
- Owners: Bill MacFarlane (1998–99); T-Rex 2000, Inc. (1999–2001)
- General manager: Kevin J Carr
- Head coach: Peter Esdale; David Latta; George Dupont

Championships
- Regular season titles: 1 (2000–01)

The Tupelo T-Rex was a professional ice hockey team in the Western Professional Hockey League and played their home games at BancorpSouth Center from 1998 to 2001. The owners of the T-Rex also fielded a junior team in the America West Hockey League from 2001 to 2003 when they were unable to continue fielding a professional team.

== History ==
The franchise was originally owned by Bill MacFarlane and was later taken over by a local ownership group in January 2000. During the 2000–01 season, the team brought in President and GM Kevin J Carr previously from the Long Beach Ice Dogs of the IHL as well key play makers including Jason Firth, Brant Blackned, and Barry McKinley who helped lead the T-Rex to a regular season championship.

=== Issues with Tupelo, CHL, and SEHL ===
After the 2000–01 season, Tupelo was invited to be a part of the WPHL-Central Hockey League merger. It would have set up a local rivalry with a CHL member, the Memphis RiverKings. However, the T-Rex ownership refused and decided not to join the merger. Their attempts to join two other pro leagues backfired when the CHL invoked a non-compete clause, claiming the territorial rights to Tupelo as part of the merger. With no other options, Tupelo folded as a pro franchise and began as a junior team in the America West Hockey League, where they lasted two more seasons before folding again in 2003.

In 2003, the T-Rex attempted to join the Atlantic Coast Hockey League, which was then succeeded by the South East Hockey League after a league split. However, the team was again barred by the Central Hockey League, which still had a five-year non-compete clause at the BancorpSouth Center, and no professional hockey team could enter the venue in Tupelo.

The legal issues the team faced prevented the team from recovering by the time the non-compete clause terminated. Since then, the only ice hockey to have been played at the BancorpSouth Arena has been by the Ole Miss Rebels and Mississippi State Bulldogs ACHA D3 men's ice hockey clubs.

== See also ==
List of defunct Mississippi sports teams
