= Garth Pollonais =

Trinidad and Tobago footballer

Personal information
- Place of birth: Trinidad and Tobago
- Position: Forward

College career
Years	Team	Apps	(Gls)
1986–1989	Erskine Flying Fleet		

Senior career*
Years	Team	Apps	(Gls)
–1990	St. Petersburg Kickers		
1990–1991	Atlanta Attack (indoor)		
1991	Tampa Bay Rowdies	4	(0)
1991–	Tulsa Ambush (indoor)		
1993	Malta Carib Alcons		
1994	Charleston Battery	23	(10)
1994–1995	Atlanta Magic (indoor)		
1995–1997	Raleigh Flyers		

International career
1981–1982	Trinidad and Tobago U18		
1984	Trinidad and Tobago U21		
- Trinidad and Tobago

Managerial career
- 1993: Malta Carib Alcons (assistant)
- 1996–1997: North Carolina Tar Heels (assistant)
- 2000–2002: Erskine Flying Fleet (men)
- 2001: Erskine Flying Fleet (women)
- 2002–2003: Greenville Lions
- * Club domestic league appearances and goals

Garth Pollonais is a Trinidad and Tobago former professional association footballer who played as a forward in both Trinidad and the United States.

== Club career ==
=== Early career ===
Pollonais grew up in Trinidad. He attended St. Augustine Senior Secondary High School where he was captain of the boys' soccer team in 1981 and the 1981 Trinidad and Tobago National High School Player of the Year. He also played for a variety of amateur teams including the Maple Soccer Club, Tacarigua United and Malt Carib Soccer Academy. In 1986, Pollonais entered Erskine College in South Carolina where he played four seasons of men's soccer. He was a four-time All-American and scored 88 career goals, adding 40 assists. He graduated in 1990 with a bachelor's degree in behavioural science and was inducted into the Erskine Hall of Fame in 2001. In addition to playing collegiate soccer in the US, Pollonais also played for the St. Petersburg Kickers during the college off season. In 1989, the Kickers won the 1989 National Challenge Cup 2–1 over Greek American AA, with Pollonais scoring the first goal of the game. In 1990, the Kickers won the National Amateur Cup.

=== Professional ===
In July 1990, the Wichita Wings selected Pollonais in the third round of the Major Indoor Soccer League draft. However, the Atlanta Attack chose him in the first round of the National Professional Soccer League draft and Pollonais chose to sign with Atlanta. Pollonais was forced to wait to play his first game with the Attack as the team had its limit of foreign players. Not until he received his green card in January 1991 was he able to enter a game. In the summer of 1991, he played for the Tampa Bay Rowdies in the American Professional Soccer League. In the fall of 1991, the Tulsa Ambush selected Pollonais in the NPSL expansion draft. In 1993, he played for the Malta Carib Alcons where he was the Eastern Region Player of the Year. In 1994, he played for the Charleston Battery in the USISL. He moved to the Atlanta Magic for the 1994–1995 indoor season before signing with the Raleigh Flyers in the spring of 1995.

== International career ==
Pollonais played for the Trinidad and Tobago U-18 national football team in 1981 and 1982. In 1984, he moved up to the U-21 national team. He later played for the full national team.

== Coaching career ==
Following his graduation from high school in 1981, Pollonais remained at St. Augustine to coach the boys' soccer team, a position he held from 1982 to 1985. During his tenure, the team won the national championship and was a four-time Eastern Regional champion. In 1993, he returned to Trinidad where he was an assistant coach with the Malta Carib Alcons. In 1996 and 1997, Pollonais served as an assistant coach with the University of North Carolina Tar Heels men's soccer team. In 1996, Pollonais began coaching at the Ravenscroft School. That year, he also became a coach with the Capital Area Soccer League. In 2000, he left both Ravenscroft and CASL when Erskine College hired him to coach the school's men's soccer team. He was the 2000 Carolinas-Virginia Conference Coach of the Year. In 2001, he became the interim coach for the women's team, a position he held for one season. In 2002, he was hired as the head coach of the Greenville Lions of the USL D-3 Pro League. The team folded following the 2003 season.
