= Manny Neves =

Portuguese-American soccer player

Personal information
- Date of birth: April 13, 1960 (age 66)
- Place of birth: Azores, Portugal
- Height: 5 ft 6 in (1.68 m)
- Position: Midfielder

Youth career
- 1979: San Diego Mesa College

Senior career*
Years	Team	Apps	(Gls)
1980–1981	California Surf	25	(0)
1982	San Diego Sockers	0	(0)
1984–1985	Houston Dynamos		
1986	Los Angeles Heat		(0)
1987–1988	San Diego Sockers (indoor)	3	(0)
- * Club domestic league appearances and goals

Manny Neves is a retired Portuguese-American soccer midfielder who played professionally in the North American Soccer League, United Soccer League, and Major Indoor Soccer League.

Born in the Azores Island of Pico, Neves’ family moved to San Diego, California at the age of 10. He graduated from Point Loma High School. He attended San Diego Mesa College in 1979, playing on the school's soccer team. The California Surf of the North American Soccer League drafted Neves. In December 1979, Neves signed with the California Surf of the North American Soccer League. The Surf folded at the end of the season and Neves moved to the San Diego Sockers where he played on the club's reserve team, but broke his leg during a game in Mexico. In 1984, Neves played for the Houston Dynamos in the United Soccer League. The USL collapsed in 1985, and the Dynamos played an independent schedule that season. In 1986, he played for the Los Angeles Heat of the Western Soccer Alliance. In 1987, he signed with the San Diego Sockers of the Major Indoor Soccer League.
