= List of defunct Mississippi sports teams =

This is a list of former sports teams from the US state of Mississippi:

== Baseball ==
=== Minor Leagues ===
==== Big South League ====
- Tupelo Tornado (1997–1998)

==== Central Baseball League ====
- Jackson Senators II (2002–2005)

==== Cotton States League ====
- Greenwood Dodgers (1934–1940 1947, 1952)
- Jackson Senators I (pre-1953)

==== Texas League ====
- Jackson Mets (1975–1990)
- Jackson Generals (1991)

==== Texas–Louisiana League ====
- Greenville Bluesmen

== Basketball ==
=== Global Basketball Association ===
- Jackson Jammers 1992–93
- Mississippi Coast Sharks 1992–93

== Football ==
=== Indoor ===
==== Indoor Professional Football League ====
- Mississippi Fire Dogs (1999–2002)
- Tupelo FireAnts (2001–2004)

==== United Indoor Football ====
- Tupelo FireAnts (2005)
- Mississippi Mudcats (2007–2008)

==== North American Football League ====
Gulf Coast Stingrays (2000–2001)

== Hockey ==
=== Minor Leagues ===
==== Western Professional Hockey League ====
- Tupelo T-Rex (1998–2001)

==== America West Hockey League ====
- Tupelo T-Rex (2001–2003)

==== East Coast Hockey League ====
- Jackson Bandits (1999–2003)

== See also ==
- List of defunct Florida sports teams
- List of defunct Georgia sports teams
- List of defunct Idaho sports teams
- List of defunct Ohio sports teams
- List of defunct Pennsylvania sports teams
- List of defunct Texas sports teams
