= Greenville Lions =

- Full name: Greenville Lions
- Nickname: The Lions
- Founded: 2001
- Dissolved: 2003
- Ground: Sirrine Stadium; Greenville, South Carolina
- Capacity: 15,000
- Owner: Miguel Banda
- President: Scott Halkett
- Head Coach: (Trinidad and Tobago) Garth Pollonais
- League: USL D3 Pro League, USL Premier Development League
- 2003 (PDL): 5th, Mid Atlantic Division
| Home colors | Away colors |

Greenville Lions were an American soccer team that played in the United Soccer Leagues (USL) D3 Pro League (later known as the USL Second Division) and operated an amateur team, Greenville Lions Premier, in the Premier Development League (PDL), the third and fourth tiers of the American soccer pyramid at the time. The team was founded in 2001 and operated until 2003.

The Lions played their home games at Sirrine Stadium on the grounds of Greenville High School in the city of Greenville, South Carolina.

== History ==
The Greenville Lions were founded as a professional soccer team in 2001 based out of Greenville, South Carolina to play in the third tier of the American soccer pyramid at the time, the USL D3 Pro League. The team was owned by Miguel Banda and Scott Halkett served as Club President. Following a successful first season, losing the championship game 0–1 to the Utah Blitzz, the club would launch and operate amateur teams in the USL Premier Development League (PDL) and the Super Y-League

== Year-by-year ==
| Year | Division | League | Reg. season | Playoffs | Open Cup |
|---|---|---|---|---|---|
| 2001 | 3 | USL D-3 Pro League | 3rd, Southern | Final | Did not qualify |
| 2002 | 3 | USL D-3 Pro League | 2nd, Southern | 1st Round | 2nd Round |
| 2003 | 4 | USL PDL | 6th, Mid-Atlantic | Did not qualify | Did not qualify |

== Coaches ==
- (Trinidad and Tobago) Garth Pollonais 2002–03

== Stadia ==
- Sirrine Stadium, Greenville, South Carolina 2003
