= Tulsa Pride =

The Tulsa Pride was an American soccer club based in Tulsa, Oklahoma that was a member of the Lone Star Soccer Alliance. The Pride were an amateur team that intended to draw its squad from collegiate players wishing to play during the summer. It was coached by Steve Earle, a former coach for the Tulsa Roughnecks. The Pride won their first two games of the season, and started the season 7–2. They finished the season 10–4, winning their division, and lost to America F.C. in the first round of the LSSA playoffs.

== Year-by-year ==
| Year | Division | League | Reg. season | Playoffs | U.S. Open Cup |
|---|---|---|---|---|---|
| 1992 | N/A | LSSA | 1st, Northern | Playoffs | Did not enter |
