= Ronil Dufrene =

American soccer player

Ron Dufrene
Personal information
- Full name: Ronil Dufrene
- Date of birth: July 4, 1962
- Place of birth: Haiti
- Height: 5 ft 9 in (1.75 m)
- Position: Midfielder

College career
Years	Team	Apps	(Gls)
1982	Ulster Senators		
1983	FIU Panthers		

Senior career*
Years	Team	Apps	(Gls)
1984	Fort Lauderdale Sun		
1984–1985	Dallas Sidekicks (indoor)	15	(0)
1985	South Florida Sun		
1986–1988	Stade Reims	42	(0)

International career
1991	United States	2	(0)
- * Club domestic league appearances and goals

Ronil Dufrene (born July 4, 1962) is a former soccer player. He spent at least one season in the United Soccer League, one in the Major Indoor Soccer League and two in the French Ligue 2. Born in Haiti, he represented the United States national team.

== College ==
Dufrene attended Ulster Community College, earning All American recognition in 1982. He then transferred to Florida International University in 1983

== Professional career ==
Dufrene signed with the Fort Lauderdale Sun of the United Soccer League. He joined the Dallas Sidekicks of Major Indoor Soccer League as a free agent on October 3, 1984. He was injured in an automobile accident on November 17, 1984, which led to his missing several months. The team released him on April 16, 1985. In 1986, he joined Stade Reims of Ligue 2. Over two seasons, he played 42 league games.

== National team ==
Dufrene earned two caps with the U.S. national team in 1991. The first was a 1–0 loss to Switzerland on February 1, 1991. Dufrene came on for Jimmy Banks in the 71st minute. The second was another 1–0 loss, this time to Bermuda on February 21, 1991. Mark Santel replaced him in the 71st minute.
