= 1978 National Challenge Cup =

- Dewar Challenge Cup

Tournament details
- Country: United States

Final positions
- Champions: Maccabee Los Angeles (4th title)
- Runners-up: Bridgeport Vasco da Gama

The 1978 National Challenge Cup was the 65th edition of the USSF's annual open soccer championship. Teams from the North American Soccer League declined to participate. Maccabee Los Angeles of Los Angeles defeated the Bridgeport Vasco da Gama of Bridgeport, Connecticut in the final game. The score was 2–0.
