= Mark Schwartz (soccer) =

American soccer player and coach

Personal information
- Place of birth: United States
- Position: Forward

Youth career
- 1979–1982: Appalachian State Mountaineers

Senior career*
Years	Team	Apps	(Gls)
1984	Fort Lauderdale Sun	24	(13)
1985	South Florida Sun	5	(3)
1986	Houston Dynamos		
1988–1989	Fort Lauderdale Strikers	?	(4)

Managerial career
- 1986–1988: Andrew College
- * Club domestic league appearances and goals

Mark Schwartz is a retired American soccer forward who played in the United Soccer League and the third American Soccer League. He was the 1984 USL Rookie of the Year.

In 1979, Schwartz graduated from Miramar High School in Miramar, Florida, where he was a star soccer player. During his three high school seasons, he scored 104 goals. He then attended Appalachian State University where he played on the men's soccer team. He graduated in 1982 and was inducted into the school's Athletic Hall of Fame in 2005. In 1984, Schwartz turned professional Fort Lauderdale Sun of the United Soccer League. He was the Rookie of the Year and playoff MVP. In the fall of 1984, Schwartz had an unsuccessful trial with the Dallas Sidekicks of the Major Indoor Soccer League. He then returned to Florida where he coached the Hollywood Hills High School girls team and played for the amateur Lowenbrau Lions of the Gold Coast Soccer League's First Division. In 1985, the Sun moved and changed their name to the South Florida Sun. The team and the league collapsed six games into the season. Schwartz then worked as a carpenter, coached Hollywood High and played for the Lowenbrau Lions. In 1986, Andrew College hired Schwartz took start a women's soccer team at the college. In 1986, he played for the Houston Dynamos. In March 1988, he signed with the Fort Lauderdale Strikers of the American Soccer League. He then started the Strikers first game of the 1989 season, but didn't play after that. He asked for and was granted his release from the team in May. Starting in August 2015, Mark has been working as a Project Engineer for Bernhardt Design in Lenoir, North Carolina.

== Yearly awards ==
- USL Rookie of the Year: 1984
- USL Playoff MVP: 1984
