= Joey Valenti =

American soccer player

Personal information
- Date of birth: August 29, 1968 (age 58)
- Place of birth: Tampa, Florida, United States
- Position: Midfielder

Youth career
- –1986: Leto Falcons

College career
Years	Team	Apps	(Gls)
1986–1989	Duke Blue Devils		

Senior career*
Years	Team	Apps	(Gls)
1989–	St. Petersburg Kickers		
1992–1993	Greensboro Dynamo		
1993	Tampa Bay Rowdies	3	(0)
1993–1995	Carolina Dynamo	48	(3)

International career
1985	United States U-16		
- * Club domestic league appearances and goals

Joey Valenti (born August 29, 1968) is a retired American soccer midfielder who played on the U.S. team at the 1985 FIFA U-16 World Championship.

Valenti attended A. P. Leto High School in Tampa, Florida where he was a 1986 Parade Magazine High School All American soccer player. Valenti and his teammates won the 1985 Florida State 4A soccer championship. In 1985, he was selected to play for the U.S. at the 1985 FIFA U-16 World Championship. Valenti and his teammates went 1–2 in the group stage and did not qualify for the second round. In 1986, he entered Duke University, playing for the Blue Devils' men's soccer team from 1986 to 1989. His freshman year, Duke won the NCAA Men's Soccer Championship and in 1988, Valenti was selected as a first team All American garnering second team honors in 1989. In 1989, Valenti was the 1989 National Challenge Cup MVP as his team, the St. Petersburg Kickers took the title. In 1992, Valenti signed with the Greensboro Dynamo of the USISL, playing for them in 1992 and 1993. In the summer of 1993, Valenti played three games with the Tampa Bay Rowdies of the American Professional Soccer League. He then returned to the Dynamo, now known as the Carolina Dynamo, playing with them until 1995. Valenti played 48 games, scoring 3 goals, over his four seasons with the Dynamo.
