= Efrain Chacurian =

Argentine-American soccer player (1924–2019)

Personal information
- Full name: Efrain Chacurian
- Date of birth: February 22, 1924
- Place of birth: Córdoba, Argentina
- Date of death: February 15, 2019 (aged 94)
- Position: Forward

Senior career*
Years	Team	Apps	(Gls)
1939–1947	Racing Club		
1947	New York Armenians		
1947–1949	Brooklyn Hispano		
1950–1958	New York Swiss		
1958–1965	Bridgeport Vasco da Gama		

International career
1953–1954	United States	4	(1)

Managerial career
- 1974–1980: Bridgeport City
- 1965–1975: Southern Connecticut State
- 1976–1979: Yale (men)
- 1978–1980: Yale (women)
- 1983–1988: Bridgeport College (assistant)
- 1989–2019: Bridgeport College
- * Club domestic league appearances and goals

Efraín or Yeprem "Chico" Chacurian (February 22, 1924 – February 15, 2019) was an Argentine-American soccer forward. He earned four caps, scoring one goal, as a member of the U.S. national team in 1953 and 1954. He was inducted into the National Soccer Hall of Fame in 1992.

== Professional career ==
Chacurian was born in Argentina to Armenian immigrant parents. In 1939, he signed with Racing Club of the Argentine First Division. He was fifteen years old at the time. In 1947 at the age of twenty-three, he moved to the United States to live with relatives of his mother to find work when a players' strike in Argentina left him penniless.

When he arrived in New York, he joined the semi-pro New York Armenians of the New York Eastern District League. In the six months he spent with the Armenians, he was named the league MVP as his team took the league title. This brought him to the attention of Brooklyn Hispano of the American Soccer League (ASL). He signed with Hispano in 1947.

When not playing, Chacurian held several side jobs including time as a printer and as a watchmaker. He also played with several All Star teams against visiting European national and professional clubs. This included games in 1949 against Scotland, Inter Milan and Celtic.

However, in the fall of 1949, Chacurian considered returning to Argentina. As he related it, "I bought a ticket to go home and visit. It took 18 days sailing one-way to Argentina. I saw my mother, and I played professional soccer down there again. Everything was successful, but I realized, I can't live here anymore. America is pulling me back." He was back in the U.S. by the end of February 1950. He then joined the New York Swiss of the German American Soccer League (GASL), and spent the next eight seasons with the Swiss. In 1958, he moved to Bridgeport City in Connecticut.

== National team ==
In 1949, the U.S. began preparations for the 1950 FIFA World Cup. While the team had considered adding Chacurian to the roster, his return to Argentina to visit his family in 1949 led to his not being selected for the team. Chacurian was not called up to the U.S. until June 8, 1953, when the team lost 6–3 to England. He played the first three games in 1954 as the U.S. attempted to qualify for the 1954 FIFA World Cup. After two losses to Mexico, the U.S. was out of the cup. However, the team had two more qualification games against Haiti yet to play. Chacurian played in both losses to Mexico and the first game against Haiti. In that game, a 3–2 win in Port-au-Prince, Chacurian scored. It was his last game with the national team.

== Coaching ==
After he retired from playing, Chacurian entered the coaching ranks as an assistant at Southern Connecticut State University. He spent ten years with Southern Connecticut.

In the fall of 1972, Yale University hired Chacurian to coach freshman soccer at Yale. During his first season there, Chico guided the team to an undefeated season (10–0) and established a culture of winning and camaraderie; his charges scored 34 goals and had only four scored against them, posting seven consecutive shutouts and even beating the Yale varsity team. In 1976, when freshmen were allowed to join the varsity directly, and the Ivy League discontinued freshman soccer in favor of a junior varsity program, Yale University moved Chacurian up to work in both the men's and then the women's soccer programs. In May 1989, he became the head coach at Bridgeport College after serving as an assistant coach for six years. He also won five league titles as the coach of Bridgeport Vasco da Gama between 1974 and 1980

Chacurian lived in Stratford, Connecticut and has a soccer field in Short Beach named after him. In 1992, he was inducted into the National Soccer Hall of Fame.

== Career statistics ==
=== International goals ===
#	Date	Venue	Opponent	Score	Result	Competition
1.	March 3, 1954	Paul Magloire Stadium, Port-au-Prince, Haiti	Haiti	2–3	Win	1954 FIFA World Cup Q.
Correct as of August 27, 2011
