= Bridgeport Vasco da Gama =

Bridgeport Vasco da Gama is an American soccer club founded in the 1940s and based in Bridgeport, Connecticut. The club plays in the Connecticut Soccer League.

The team is notable for making the finals of the 1978 National Challenge Cup and 1992 U.S. Open Cup. They lost the 1978 final to Maccabi Los Angeles, and the 1992 final to the San Jose Oaks.

== Head coaches ==
- Efrain Chacurian (1974-1980)
- (Poland) Leszek Wrona (1993-1994)
