= Nathan Sacks =

South African soccer player

Nathan Sacks נתן זקס
Personal information
- Date of birth: 16 June 1959 (age 67)
- Place of birth: Pretoria, South Africa
- Position: Midfielder

Senior career*
Years	Team	Apps	(Gls)
1981	Dallas Tornado	16	(0)
1981–1983	Pittsburgh Spirit (indoor)	51	(15)
1984	Houston Dynamos		
1983–1986	Los Angeles Lazers (indoor)	93	(20)
1986	Los Angeles Heat	-	(-)
1986–1987	Tampa Bay Rowdies (indoor)	-	(-)
1987–1988	Bnei Yehuda		
1989–1990	Los Angeles Heat		
- * Club domestic league appearances and goals

Nathan Sacks (Hebrew: נתן זקס) is a former South African professional football (soccer) player who spent one season in the North American Soccer League.

== Professional ==
In 1981, Sacks signed with the Dallas Tornado of the North American Soccer League. In the fall of 1981, he moved to the Pittsburgh Spirit of the Major Indoor Soccer League. In 1984, Sacks played for the Houston Dynamos in the United Soccer League. In the fall of 1983, he signed with the Los Angeles Lazers of the Major Indoor Soccer League. He would play three seasons with the Lazers. In 1986, he played for the Los Angeles Heat in the Western Soccer Alliance. That fall, he signed with the Tampa Bay Rowdies of the American Indoor Soccer Association. He returned to the Heat for the 1989 and 1990 seasons.
