= Leszek Wrona =

Polish footballer and manager

Personal information
- Date of birth: 20 September 1955 (age 71)
- Place of birth: Kraków, Poland
- Height: 1.73 m (5 ft 8 in)
- Positions: Defender; midfielder

Senior career*
Years	Team	Apps	(Gls)
1972–1976	Garbarnia Kraków		
1976–1978	Legia Warsaw	0	(0)
1979–1980	Hutnik Kraków		(17)
1980–1984	Ruch Chorzów	102	(5)
1984–1987	Paderborn		
1987–1989	Ruch Chorzów		
1989–1990	Garfield Vistula		
1990–1991	Gremio Lusitano		
1991–1992	Polonia Falcons		
1992–1995	Connecticut Wolves		
1993–1994	Bridgeport Vasco da Gama		
1995–1997	Albany Alleycats		
1998–2000	Western Mass Pioneers		

Managerial career
- 1990–1991: Gremio Lusitano (player-manager)
- 1992: Polonia Falcons (player-manager)
- 1993–1995: Connecticut Wolves (player-manager)
- 1993–1994: Bridgeport Vasco da Gama (player-manager)
- 1996–1997: Albany Alleycats (player-manager)
- 1998–2000: Western Mass Pioneers (player-manager)
- 2004–2006: Western Mass Pioneers
- 2008–2010: Western Mass Pioneers
- * Club domestic league appearances and goals

Leszek Wrona (born 20 September 1955) is a Polish former professional footballer who played as a defender in Poland, Germany and the United States. After his retirement, he remained in the United States where he coached in the USISL and USL PDL. Wrona is regarded as one of the finest players in Connecticut soccer history.

== Biography ==
In 1972, the seventeen-year-old Wrona debuted for Garbarnia Kraków. In 1976, he moved to Legia Warsaw where he spent most of two seasons with the club's reserve team. He played one league cup game against Stal Mielec on 8 June 1976. In 1979, he moved to second division Hutnik Kraków where he tied for the league scoring lead that season. In 1980, he signed with Ruch Chorzów.

In 1984, Wrona moved to Germany where he joined TuS Schloß Neuhaus. In 1985, the team merged with TuS Paderborn-Neuhaus to form SC Paderborn 07. Wrona remained with the renamed team for two more seasons before briefly spending time with the New Jersey Eagles during the 1988 American Soccer League season. He then returned to Ruch Chorzów where he was part of the club's 1989 Polish championship. He left the team after the championship and moved to the United States.

He played for Garfield Vistula. In 1990, Wrona became a player-coach with Gremio Lusitano, taking the team to the 1991 LASA league championship. In 1992, he moved to the Polonia Falcons where he took them to the 1992 CSSA Cup Championship. In 1993, the expansion Connecticut Wolves of the USISL hired Wrona as the team's first head coach. He both coached and played for the Wolves until resigning in June 1995. During that time, he also played and coached for Bridgeport Vasco da Gama.

After leaving Wolves, Wrona spent the rest of the 1995 season playing for the Albany Alleycats. That year, he also became the head coach of the Plainville High School boys’ team, a position he held until 1999. In 2000, he became the head coach of the Plainville girls’ team. In 1996, Wrona briefly coached the Albany Alleycatsteam, then became the head coach for the 1997 season. In 1997, Gremio Lusitano founded the Western Mass Pioneers to compete in the USISL D-3 Pro League. In October 1997, the team named Wrona as head coach. Wrona took the Pioneers to the 1998 league championship. He left the team in 2000, returned in 2004, left the team in 2006 and returned in 2008. He left the team for the third time in June 2010.

Wrona now runs a youth soccer academy out of an indoor soccer facility in Bristol. Leszek Wrona's Soccer Academy aims to give young players coaching, aiming to improve their ball skills as well as their "soccer IQ".
