= A.A.C. Eagles =

American soccer team

AAC Eagles
- Full name: American Athletic Club Eagles
- Nickname: Eagles
- Founded: 1940; 86 years ago
- Chairman: Renata Bechtoldt
- Coach: Pawel Otachel
- League: Premier Soccer League of Chicagoland
Home colors

AAC Eagles Chicago Soccer Academy is an American soccer team based in Chicago, Illinois, United States. Founded in 1940, the team plays in Region II of the United States Adult Soccer Association, a network of amateur leagues at the fifth tier of the American Soccer Pyramid. They joined the United Premier Soccer League in 2022. However, due to a dispute with league management, the team left for the local Metropolitan Soccer League, and following that league's merger with the National Soccer League to become the Greater Chicago Soccer League, they left for the Premier League where they play as of 2024.

The team's colors are red and white.

== History ==
The Eagles were formed as an ethnic club by Polish American immigrants to the Chicago area in 1940. Originally known as the Polish American Athletic Club Eagles (PAAC Eagles), the team first played in the National Soccer League of Chicago, and played under that name until 1950, when the team became officially known as the Chicago Eagles. Since then the team has been known by various names, swapping between its earlier names (PAAC Eagles, Chicago Eagles), and newer variants (Chicago American Eagles, Polish Eagles), before settling on its current incarnation in the mid-1990s. The Eagles currently play in the Metropolitan Soccer League, which is a member of the United States Adult Soccer Association Region II group of leagues.

The Eagles have a long and distinguished history of competing in the National Challenge Cup. Having already reached the final stages of the competition during its early years in 1948 and 1949, the Eagles reached the semifinals in 1989, losing on penalties to eventual winners St. Petersburg Kickers, and won the tournament in 1990 in the pre-MLS era, beating the Brooklyn Italians 2–0 in the final thanks to goals from Janusz Kieca and Peter Modrzejewski. Their win in the competition also gave them entry to the 1991 CONCACAF Champions' Cup, where they lost 4–1 on aggregate in the first round to Bermudian club PHC Zebras.

The Eagles qualified for the cup again in 1994, the last all-amateur competition prior to the entrance of teams from Major League Soccer, but lost 2–1 to Bavarian Leinenkugel in the quarterfinals. Since the introduction of professional teams into the cup the Eagles have not fared as well. They lost in the first round to the Chicago Stingers in 1995, lost in the first round again in 2002 to New York Freedom, and lost in the first round for a third time in 2005, this time falling 4–1 to USL Premier Development League side Chicago Fire Premier.

In 2008 the club qualified for their fourth modern U.S. Open Cup, beating the Milwaukee Bavarians and Des Moines Menace Reserves in their regional qualification tournament, but lost 4–0 in the first round to the Pittsburgh Riverhounds of the USL Second Division.

In addition to their USOC triumph in 1990, the Eagles won the USASA Open Cup in 1989 and 2002. They are nine-time Illinois state champions, eleven-time Metropolitan Soccer League Major Division champions, and also sponsored the Chicago Eagles Select which briefly played in the USL Premier Development League in 2001 and 2002.

In 2022 Eagles announced via social media their joining the United Premier Soccer League. This would only last for the Spring 2022, after which they left for the local Metropolitan Soccer League. When that league merged with the National Soccer League to ultimately form the Greater Chicago Soccer League in 2023, the Eagles chose to play in the Premier Soccer League of Chicagoland.

== Players ==
=== Current roster ===
Note: Flags indicate national team as defined under FIFA eligibility rules; some limited exceptions apply. Players may hold more than one non-FIFA nationality.

No.	Pos.	Nation	Player
—	MF	USA	Christopher Gasiorek
—	FW	POL	Marek Golik
—	MF	POL	Michael Kausta
—	FW	USA	Matthew Kochanowski
—	DF	POL	Piotr Kolasinski
—	MF	POL	Jacek Lechowicz
—	GK	POL	Marek Los
—	DF	POL	Mariusz Misiaszek
—	DF	POL	Miroslaw Modzelewski
—	DF	POL	Mariusz Napiorkowski
—	MF	USA	Mark Nerkowski
—	MF	POL	Pawel Otachel

No.	Pos.	Nation	Player
—	DF	POL	Lukasz Pieniazek
—	DF	POL	Marcin Pieniazek
—	FW	POL	Jakub Piotrowski
—	DF	POL	Pawel Policht
—	FW	POL	Rafal Popko
—	MF	POL	Marcin Simson
—	MF	POL	Adrian Skital
—	MF	POL	Sebastian Skital
—	GK	POL	Piotr Sliwa
—	FW	POL	Kamil Szczepanski
—	DF	POL	Darek Szewczyk
—	MF	POL	Rafal Zalewski
—	MF	USA	Michael Stankiewicz

== Year-by-year ==
Year	Division	League	Regular-season	Playoffs	U.S. Open Cup
1948		–			Quarterfinals (West)
1949		–			Final (West)
1989	5	USASA			Semifinals
1990	5	USASA			Champions
1994	5	USASA			Quarter-finals
1995	5	USASA			1st Round
2002	5	USASA			1st Round
2005	5	USASA			1st Round
2008	5	USASA			1st Round
2010	5	USASA			Did not qualify
2011	5	USASA			1st Round

== Honors ==
- U.S. Open Cup Winner (1): 1990
- National Amateur Cup Winner (1): 1989
- Peel Cup Winner (7): 1950, 1954, 1955, 1957, 1963, 1999, 2000
- Participations in CONCACAF Champions' Cup: 1991

== Head coaches ==
- (Poland) Pawel Otachel (present)
