= Steve Myers =

American soccer player

Personal information
- Full name: Stephen Martin Myers
- Date of birth: July 6, 1963 (age 63)
- Place of birth: Tulsa, Oklahoma, U.S.
- Position: Goalkeeper

Senior career*
Years	Team	Apps	(Gls)
1984	Tulsa Roughnecks	1	(0)
1986–1992	Oklahoma City Warriors		
- * Club domestic league appearances and goals

Stephen Martin Myers (born July 6, 1963) is an American retired soccer goalkeeper who played professionally in the North American Soccer League. In November 2009 he was sentenced to 24 years in prison for kidnapping and sexual assault of a child.

== Biography ==
In 1984, Myers signed with the Tulsa Roughnecks of the North American Soccer League. He played his only game with the Roughnecks in a 1–0 loss to the Toronto Blizzard on May 12, 1984, In 1985, a second Roughnecks briefly played an independent exhibition schedule with Myers in goal. In 1986, Myers joined the semi-professional Oklahoma City Warriors of the Southwest Indoor Soccer League. He was the 1986–87 Southwest Indoor Soccer League Goalkeeper of the Year. Myers continued to play for the Warriors through 1992.

He later coached girls youth soccer for the Littleton Soccer Club in Littleton, Colorado. In October 2008 he was arrested, for statutory rape of a 13-year-old girl who was one of his students. He pleaded guilty in August 2009. In November 2009 he was sentenced to 24 years in prison in Jefferson County District Court for kidnapping and sexual assault of a child.
