= Wichita Falls Fever =

The Wichita Falls Fever was an American soccer club based in Wichita Falls, Texas that was a member of the Lone Star Soccer Alliance.

== Year-by-year ==
Year	Division	League	Reg. season	Playoffs	U.S. Open Cup
1989	N/A	LSSA	4th	Playoffs	Did not enter
1990	N/A	LSSA	3rd, Northern	Did not qualify	Did not enter
1991	N/A	LSSA	2nd, Northern	Playoffs	Did not enter
1992	N/A	LSSA	3rd, Northern	Did not qualify	Region III Semifinals
