= Houston Alianza =

- Full name: Houston Alianza International Soccer Team
- Nickname: Alianza
- Founded: 1987
- Dissolved: 1992
- Ground: Houston, Texas, US
Home colours	Away colours	Third colours

The Houston Alianza, also known as Allianza Internacional, was an American soccer club based in Houston, Texas, that was a member of the Lone Star Soccer Alliance from 1988 to 1991.

== History ==
Alianza began as an Hispanic All-Star team from the Houston Soccer Association. The team entered the LSSA for the 1988 season and continued to exist until folding before the 1992 season. During its early existence, Victor Delgadillo managed the team which was composed of several ex-professionals from Mexico and Central America who now played strictly as amateurs.

== Year-by-year ==
Year	Division	League	Reg. season	Playoffs	U.S. Open Cup
1988	N/A	LSSA	4th	Playoffs	Did not enter
1989	N/A	LSSA	5th	Did not qualify	Did not enter
1990	N/A	LSSA	3rd, Southern	Did not qualify	Did not enter
1991	N/A	LSSA	2nd, Southern	Playoffs	Did not enter
