= Austin Thunder =

American Soccer Team

- Founded: 1987
- Ground: House Park; Westlake High School
- Capacity: 6,500
- Coordinates: 30.27798°N 97.749578°W
- Coach: Nigel Bowman

The Austin Thunder was an American soccer club based in Austin, Texas that was a member of the Lone Star Soccer Alliance.

== History ==
In 1987, Nigel Bowman and Jeff Brown founded The Austin Thunder, the first semi-professional soccer team in Austin, as part of the Lone Star Soccer Alliance, initially playing at House Park. The Thunder ended their first season with a 3–3 record, finishing third in the Lone Star Soccer Alliance.

Lone Star Soccer Alliance announced that the 1998 season would have five teams in an eight-game season format. For the second season in a row, The Austin Thunder finished in third place in the Lone Star Soccer Alliance.

In the 1989 season, Nigel Bowman continued to encourage soccer in Austin by developing new talent for the team. Working to improve the players understanding of the game, in addition to their physical talents. These changes lead the team to their first championship game, where they played FC Dallas, who had 35 straight wins over the last three seasons. The Thunder were able to beat FC Dallas 3–2 in the final, claiming their only LSSA championship. Three players made the all-star team that year. Richard Johnson at defense, Nigel Bowman at midfield, and Derek Missimo at forward.

LSSA added two more teams for the 1990 season and split the league into two divisions. The Thunder played in the South Division and was aligned the Houston Dynamos, Houston Alianza, and San Antonio Alamo. Bringing back nine players from their 1989 championship team allowed the Thunder to reach the playoffs for a second year in a row. In a repeat of the 1989 finals, the Thunder met FC Dallas in the semi-finals, losing 1–0.

1991 was another successful season for the Austin Thunder, with the team winning the South division and earning a spot in the LSSA championship against long time powerhouse FC Dallas. In a rematch of the 1989 finals, the Austin Thunder fell to FC Dallas in the seventh round of a penalty shoot-out, after playing 120 minutes to a 3–3 tie. For the 1991 LSSA all-star game, Nigel Bowman was selected to co-coach the South's team.

The Austin Thunder started the 1992 season with a friendly against Queen's Park F.C., a professional team from Scottish Football League Second Division. The Austin Thunder's 1992 season was both their last season in the LSSA and last season as a semi-professional team. As of 2024, they continue to play amateur soccer in the Austin Men's Soccer Association.

== Austin Thunder Ladies ==
Austin Thunder also had a girls program that was a finalist in the Division One Texas State Cup in 1989. Playing in youth tournaments, the Austin Thunder Ladies won the 1991 South Texas State Cup. The Thunder Ladies team's success continued and in 1991 they were invited to England for the Watford International Women's Tournament. After losing their first game to Sheffield Wednesday, the Thunder Ladies beat Manchester women's select, North West to earn a place in the finals. The Austin Thunder Ladies beat Sheffield Wednesday 3–2 in the finals to capture the Watford International Women's Tournament.

== Year-by-year ==
| Year | Division | League | Reg. season | Playoffs | U.S. Open Cup |
|---|---|---|---|---|---|
| 1987 | N/A | LSSA | 3rd | No playoff | Did not enter |
| 1988 | N/A | LSSA | 3rd | Playoffs | Did not enter |
| 1989 | N/A | LSSA | 2nd | Champion | Did not enter |
| 1990 | N/A | LSSA | 2nd, Southern | Playoffs | Did not enter |
| 1991 | N/A | LSSA | 1st, Southern | Final | Did not enter |
| 1992 | N/A | LSSA | 3rd, Southern | Did not qualify | Did not enter |
| 1993–2023 | Fully Amateur | | | | |
| 2024 | Fully Amateur | | | | 3rd Qualifying Round |
| 2025 | TBD | | | | 2nd Qualifying Round |

== Honors ==
- Lone Star Soccer Alliance
  - Champions: 1989
  - Runners up: 1991
- South Texas State Cup
  - Champions: 1987
- Austin Men's Soccer Association
  - Champions 2009, 2010, 2011, 2013, 2014, 2016, 2023, 2024

== See also ==
- Austin Lone Stars
- Austin Lightning
- Austin Aztex
- Austin Aztex U23
- Austin Bold FC
- Austin United FC
- Austin FC
- Austin FC II
