= John Lignos =

American soccer player

Personal information
- Date of birth: February 2, 1958 (age 68)
- Place of birth: Chios, Greece
- Height: 5 ft 11 in (1.80 m)
- Position: Defender

Senior career*
Years	Team	Apps	(Gls)
1979–1980	New England Tea Men	30	(0)
1979–1981	New England Tea Men (indoor)	28	(6)
1981–1983	Jacksonville Tea Men		
1984	Fort Lauderdale Sun		
1987–1988	Canton Invaders (indoor)		
- Greek-American/Atlas
1996–1997	Toronto Shooting Stars (indoor)	20	(2)

International career
1982	United States	1	(0)
- * Club domestic league appearances and goals

John Lignos (born in Chios, Greece) was a U.S. soccer player who spent four seasons in the North American Soccer League, one in the American Soccer League and one in the United Soccer League. He also earned one cap with the U.S. national team and was selected for the 1980 U.S. Olympic soccer team.

== Professional ==
Born in the town of Amades on the Greek island of Chios, but moved to New York when he was eleven. In 1979, he was the top draft pick of the New England Tea Men of the North American Soccer League. While usually playing on the defensive line, he moved to defensive midfielder in 1980 to make room for rookie defender Mike Gibbon. Following the 1980 season, the Tea Men moved to Jacksonville, Florida. Lignos moved with the team. He played twenty-seven games, scoring one goal, as the Tea Men remained in the NASL for the 1981 and 1982 seasons. In 1983, the Tea Men left the NASL for the American Soccer League (ASL). They won the 1983 ASL championship over the Pennsylvania Stoners. The ASL folded at the end of the season. On April 17, 1984, Lignos signed with the Fort Lauderdale Sun in the United Soccer League for the 1984 season. He played at least one season with the Canton Invaders during the 1987-1988 American Indoor Soccer League season. He returned to the professional game in 1996 for one season with the Toronto Shooting Stars in the National Professional Soccer League.

== Semi-professional ==
Lignos then moved back to New York where he joined the Greek-American/Atlas of the Cosmopolitan Soccer League. In 1989, the Greek-Americans went to the National Challenge Cup final where it fell, 2–1, to the St. Petersburg Kickers. Lignos scoring the Greek-Americans’ lone goal.

== National team ==
Lignos was selected for the U.S. soccer team which qualified for the 1980 Summer Olympics. However, he and his teammates did not compete after President Jimmy Carter boycotted the Olympics following the Soviet invasion of Afghanistan. Lignos earned one cap with the U.S. national team in a 2–1 win over Trinidad and Tobago on March 21, 1982, when he came on for Tom O’Hara.
