= San Antonio International =

San Antonio International was an American soccer club based in San Antonio, Texas that was a member of the Lone Star Soccer Alliance.

The club was known as the San Antonio Alamo in their final season.

== Year-by-year ==
Year	Division	League	Reg. season	Playoffs	U.S. Open Cup
1987	N/A	LSSA	4th	No playoff	Did not enter
1988	N/A	LSSA	5th	Did not qualify	Did not enter
1989	N/A	LSSA	6th	Did not qualify	Did not enter
1990	N/A	LSSA	1st, Southern	Playoffs	Did not enter
