= Gulf Coast Swords =

- City: Bradenton, Florida
- League: ECHL
- Home arena: Lakewood Arena
- Colors: Black, Red, White

Franchise history
- 1989–2000: Hampton Roads Admirals
- 2001–2004: Columbus Cottonmouths
- never played: Gulf Coast Swords

The Gulf Coast Swords were a planned expansion team of the East Coast Hockey League (ECHL). Due to years of delays in the construction of Lakewood Arena in Bradenton, Florida, the ECHL terminated the franchise on September 28, 2006, more than two years after the franchise was supposed to begin play.

== History ==
The franchise originated in Norfolk, Virginia in 1989 as the Hampton Roads Admirals and played at the Norfolk Scope until the completion of the 1999–2000 ECHL season when the Admirals' ownership obtained a franchise in the AHL as the Norfolk Admirals. The Admirals' owners sold their ECHL franchise rights to the Columbus Cottonmouths, an organization that had been playing in the Central Hockey League, in 2001. In April 2004, the ECHL Board of Governors approved a voluntary suspension request for the franchise and a transfer of home territory request from the membership, allowing the franchise to relocate to Florida.

A contest was held to name the relocated franchise in September 2004, with over 3,000 entries received. The winning entry was created by eleven-year-old Mitchell Hudson, whose father Brian suggested the idea of creating a logo after an evening dinner as a way "to keep him busy for the weekend." The logo was later debuted in front of seventy people at nearby Lakeland County Club, located several miles from the nearby arena.

The Swords were originally granted a waiver to skip the 2004–05 ECHL season due to their relocation from Columbus, Georgia, and join the league at the start of the 2005–06 ECHL season. On February 7, 2005, Waldinger-Albridge (the contractor assigned to build the Swords' new arena) halted construction on the new arena. During the league's teleconference in April 2005, ECHL commissioner Brian McKenna attempted to contact DVS Sports, the firm in charge of building the new arena. DVA Sports Vice President Larry Kish did not return any calls. The Swords eventually asked for a second one-year waiver in order for their arena to be completed. Despite a full season without a game played, coach Brian Curran was retained by the team and remained under contract during the franchise's inactive status.

After years of mounting debt (estimated to be near $20,000,000 in unpaid bills), several lawsuits, and years of franchise inactivity, the ECHL finally terminated the franchise on September 28, 2006, "effective immediately." The decision was made at the annual ECHL Board Of Governors meeting, which was held in Pittsburgh, Pennsylvania. The league terminated the franchise based on the belief that construction would never continue. The incomplete, unnamed arena sat at Lakewood Ranch with no activity in the previous eighteen months. A statement from then-ECHL commissioner McKenna said that "there's a lot of talk, but we have not been presented with any evidence that it is moving forward. You've got to be building a facility. Even if the project changes hands, that's a long way away from where you need to be."

The Schroeder-Manatee Group closed the door on the unbuilt arena on April 21, 2009. The land originally used to build the unnamed arena was purchased by the group at a foreclosure sale for $100. Court battles and bankruptcy hearings (including two for DVS Sports) prevented the property from being sold beforehand. Both Chuck Madden and Larry Kish were both on hand for the foreclosure sale and the end of what they had started. Madden described the sale to be "like a funeral" to him. Due to changing building codes and an incomplete arena with three concrete walls standing alone, demolition was also considered due to the incomplete building not meeting building codes for hurricane resistance. Coincidentally, one of the arena's potential uses was for it to be used as a hurricane shelter.

Local officials decided to raze the remaining walls to the incomplete arena in October 2009. Local residents called the walls an eyesore and mockingly referred to the walls as "Stonehenge". Instead of exploding the walls and creating more rubble and cleanup, the walls were eventually lowered to the ground by C&M Road Builders and Southeast Site Development.
