= List of defunct Georgia sports teams =

This is a list of former sports teams from the US state of Georgia:

== Baseball ==
=== Major Leagues ===
==== Negro league baseball ====
- Atlanta Black Crackers (1920–1938)

=== Minor Leagues ===
==== Georgia–Florida League ====
- Albany Cardinals (1947–1958)
- Americus Phillies (1947–1950), Americus Rebels (1951)
- Americus-Cordele Orioles (1954–1955)
- Brunswick Pirates (1951–1956)
- Cordele A's (1950–1953)
- Cordele Indians (1947–1949)
- Dublin Orioles (1958)
- Fitzgerald A's (1956)
- Fitzgerald Orioles (1957)
- Fitzgerald Pioneers (1953), Fitzgerald Redlegs (1954)
- Moultrie A's (1948–1949)
- Moultrie Cubs (1950)
- Moultrie Giants (1952)
- Moultrie Packers (1947)
- Moultrie Reds (1955–1956)
- Moultrie To-baks (1951)
- Moultrie/Brunswick Phillies (1957–1958)
- Thomasville Dodgers (1953–1958)
- Thomasville Tigers (1947–1950)
- Thomasville Tomcats (1952)
- Tifton Blue Sox (1951–1953) (1955)
- Tifton Indians (1954)
- Tifton Phillies (1956)
- Valdosta Dodgers (1946–1952), Valdosta Browns (1953), Valdosta Tigers (1954–1958)
- Valdosta Trojans (1939–1942)
- Waycross Bears, (1947–1955), Waycross Braves (1956–1958),

==== South Coast League ====
- Macon Music (2007)
- South Georgia Peanuts (2007)

==== Southern League ====
- Atlanta Crackers (1884-1965)
- Savannah White Sox (1962), became Lynchburg White Sox (1963–1965), Evansville White Sox (1966–1968), Columbus White Sox (1969), Columbus Astros (1970–1988), Columbus Mudcats (1989–1990), the Carolina Mudcats (1991–2011)
- Columbus Confederate Yankees (1964–1966)
- Macon Peaches
- Savannah Braves
- Savannah Indians
- Savannah Senators

==== Western Carolinas League / South Atlantic League ====
- Albany Polecats (1992–1995)
- Augusta Pirates
- Augusta Tourists
- Columbus Indians (1991), later became the Columbus RedStixx (1992–2002), moved to Eastlake, Ohio
- Macon Braves became the Rome Braves in 2003
- Macon Peaches
- Macon Pirates
- Macon Redbirds
- Savannah Cardinals (1984–1995), became the Savannah Sand Gnats in 1996
- Savannah Sand Gnats (1996-2015), moved to Columbia, South Carolina to become the Columbia Fireflies
- South Georgia Waves, based in Albany, GA in 2002 and Columbus, GA in 2003, became Columbus Catfish (2004-2008), moved to Bowling Green, Kentucky and now play as the Bowling Green Hot Rods.

== Basketball ==
=== Men's ===
==== Global Basketball Association ====
- Albany Sharp Shooters (1991–1992)
- SouthGA Blues (1991–1992)

=== Women's ===
==== American Basketball League ====
- Atlanta Glory (1996–1998)

== Football ==
=== Atlantic Coast Football League ===
- Atlanta Spartans (1964)

=== Arena football ===
- Georgia Force (2002–2008 (League folded), 2011–2012 (Team folded))

== Hockey ==
=== Major leagues ===
==== National Hockey League (NHL) ====
- Atlanta Flames (1972–1980) – relocated to Calgary, Alberta, now Calgary Flames
- Atlanta Thrashers (1999–2011) – relocated to Winnipeg, Manitoba, now Winnipeg Jets

=== Minor leagues ===
==== Atlantic Coast Hockey League ====
- Macon Trax (2002–2003) Moved to WHA2 for 2003–04

==== Central Hockey League ====
- Columbus Cottonmouths (1996–2001) Obtained a franchise in the East Coast Hockey League
- Macon Whoopee (1996–2001)

==== East Coast Hockey League/ECHL ====
- Augusta Lynx (1998–2008) Folded midseason
- Columbus Cottonmouths (2001–2004) Cottonmouths' organization joined the Southern Professional Hockey League and the ECHL franchise moved to Bradenton–Sarasota, Florida, to play as Gulf Coast Swords, franchise revoked in summer 2006 after construction halted on proposed home arena
- Macon Whoopee (2001–2002) moved to Lexington, Kentucky, as Lexington Men O' War, now Utah Grizzlies

==== International Hockey League ====
- Atlanta Knights (1992–1996) Became the Quebec Rafales (1996–1998)

==== Southern Hockey League ====
- Macon Whoopees (1973–1974)

==== Southern Professional Hockey League ====
- Augusta RiverHawks (2010–2013) Arena's ice system failed and the team became the Macon Mayhem in 2015
- Columbus Cottonmouths (2004–2017)
- Macon Trax (2004–2005)

== Soccer ==
=== North American Soccer League ===
- Atlanta Chiefs (1967–1972), became the Atlanta Apollos in 1973, revived the Chief's name in 1979, then folded in 1981
- Atlanta Silverbacks (1998 as the Atlanta Ruckus-2016), A-League, USISL, USL and finally NASL

=== United Soccer Leagues ===
- Atlanta Magic/Atlanta Datagraphic Magic/Atlanta Lasers (Indoor: 1991–1992) (Outdoor: 1993–1996)
- Atlanta Express (Indoor: 1990/91) (Outdoor: 1991)
- Georgia Steamers (1990–1991), became the Atlanta Quicksilver then was renamed the Atlanta Lightning

=== Women's United Soccer Association ===
- Atlanta Beat (2000–2003)

== See also ==
- List of defunct Florida sports teams
- List of defunct Mississippi sports teams
- List of defunct Ohio sports teams
- List of defunct Pennsylvania sports teams
