= Jim Tietjens =

American soccer player

Personal information
- Full name: James Arthur Paul Tietjens
- Date of birth: February 25, 1960 (age 66)
- Place of birth: St. Louis, Missouri, United States
- Position: Goalkeeper

Youth career
- 1978–1979: St. Louis Billikens

Senior career*
Years	Team	Apps	(Gls)
1980–1983	Fort Lauderdale Strikers	2	(0)
1980–1983	Fort Lauderdale Strikers (indoor)	2	(0)
1983–1984	Kansas City Comets (indoor)	7	(0)
1984	Fort Lauderdale Sun	23	(0)
1985	South Florida Sun	6	(0)
- * Club domestic league appearances and goals

Jim Tietjens is a retired American soccer goalkeeper who played professionally in the North American Soccer League, Major Indoor Soccer League and United Soccer League.

Tietjens graduated from Oakville High School. He then attended St. Louis University where he played on the men's soccer team from 1978 and 1979. He was inducted into the Billikens Hall of Fame in 1995. In 1980, he turned professional with the Fort Lauderdale Strikers of the North American Soccer League. He spent three season with the Strikers as a backup to Jan van Beveren except for two games during his rookie season when injuries put him in the nets. He suffered a knee injury requiring surgery during a February 1983 indoor tournament and remained a backup for the 1983 season. In November 1983, he signed with the Kansas City Comets of the Major Indoor Soccer League. However, he lost much of the early season with a dislocated shoulder then served as a backup for the rest of the season. In May 1984, he signed with the Fort Lauderdale Sun of the United Soccer League. He led the league with the lowest goals against average. He continued to play for the Sun, now known as the South Florida Sun in 1985. He had the second lowest goals against average. When the team and the league collapsed after six games, Tietjens moved back to St. Louis where he worked for Rawling Sports. In October 1991, Tietjens was diagnosed with a heart problem. In July 1992, Tietjens was given a life saving heart transplant.

Jim is currently the Director of Trade Marketing Planning at Anheuser Busch in St. Louis, MO.

== Yearly Awards ==
- USL Top Goalkeeper: 1984
