= St. Petersburg Kickers =

St. Pete Kickers FC
- Full name: St. Petersburg Kickers FC
- Nickname: Kickers FC
- Founded: 1957
- Stadium: Ed Radice Sports Complex
- General Manager: George Fotopoulos
- League: Florida Suncoast Soccer League

The St. Petersburg Kickers FC are an amateur American soccer team from St. Petersburg, Florida that compete in the Florida Suncoast Soccer League (FSSL). They are notable as the first team from Florida to win the U.S. Open Cup.

== History ==
Founded by Kurt Herbach in 1957, the Kickers won their first national title, the Over-30 championship, in 1967. By 1989, the team had won eleven Florida Suncoast Soccer League championships and four Florida State Cups. The club's most prestigious victory came on the national stage winning the 1989 National Challenge Cup (now known as US Open Cup).

In 1997, the team moved to Land o' Lakes, Florida, eventually taking the name of Florida Kickers FC. That year the club won both the National Amateur Cup and the National Over-30 championship. In 2008, it won its third national amateur championship.

== Honors ==
- National Challenge Cup winners: 1 (1989)
- National Amateur Cup winners: 3 (1990, 1997, 2008)
- National Amateur Cup runners-up: 1 (2003)
- Participations in CONCACAF Champions' Cup: 1990

== Coaches ==
- Steve Gogas (1972-)
- Chris McMaster
- Wim Suurbier (1994)

== Notable players ==
- (United States) Derek Backman
- (United States) Matt Clare
- (United States) Garth Pollonais
- (United States) Andrew Restrepo
- (United States) Joey Valenti
- (United States) Tanner Wolfe
- (United States) J.P. Reyes
