= Fort Lauderdale Sun =

- Full name: South Florida Sun
- Founded: 1984
- Dissolved: July 1985; 41 years ago
- Stadium: Lockhart Stadium
- Capacity: 19,020
- Owner: Ronnie Sharp
- Chairman: Jeff Sarkin (General Manager)
- Head Coach: Keith Weller
- League: United Soccer League (1984–1985)
- Champions
Home colors	Away colors	Third colors

Fort Lauderdale/South Florida Sun was a professional U.S. soccer team which played two seasons in the United Soccer League.

== Origins ==
In November 1983, The Fort Lauderdale Strikers of the North American Soccer League, motivated in part by the lack of a suitable arena in the Fort Lauderdale area for the league's winter indoor season, announced that they would be moving to Minnesota. The outdoor version of the Strikers had attracted a relatively robust fan base in the late 1970s and early 80s, and retired Miami Toros and Strikers player Ronnie Sharp headed up a group that believed that the city was still a good market for the game. They were granted a franchise by the second division American Soccer League's expansion committee to join them in 1984, but this decision was challenged when league meetings opened in January of that year. League by-laws allowed the owners of dormant franchises to retain territorial control, and the owner of dormant franchises in New York and Miami wanted to claim his control over south Florida and be the one to lead a Fort Lauderdale expansion effort. This dispute would be the catalyst for a seismic change in the second tier of pro soccer, as the owners of the ASL's Jacksonville Tea Men and Dallas Americans would see it as confirmation that the ASL was too hampered by its cadre of inactive owners and not financially sound enough to have much of a future. They broke away to form what they hoped would be a better-organized and more stable league to be called the United Soccer League. The USL offered Sharp's group a place, and the rest of the teams who had been planning to play in the ASL in 1984 either also defected to the new league or folded over the next few months. The new Fort Lauderdale club chose the name Sun, and they joined the Tea Men and Charlotte Gold in the Southern Division of the nine team USL.

== 1984: Champions ==
When the Sun built its team for the 1984 season, they were able to secure the services of several former Strikers who had chosen not to go north with the NASL club. Teófilo Cubillas, Jim Tietjens, Ernst-Jean Baptiste, and player-coach Keith Weller all signed with the Sun (though Cubillas would only commit to playing home games), and they were joined by former English international Dave Watson and former Scottish international Asa Hartford, giving the Sun one of the most talented rosters in the league. This paid dividends, as they played to a 15–9 record, scoring fifty-three goals and giving up only thirty-four. The Sun finished at the top of the Southern Division and just a few standings points behind the Oklahoma City Stampede for the top seed in the playoffs. They would achieve this on-field success despite primary owner Ronnie Sharp's arrest less than a month into the season for alleged participation in a large drug smuggling operation.

In the playoff semifinals, the Sun crushed the Buffalo Storm by scores of 3‍–‍0 and 5‍–‍1. The championship round against the Houston Dynamos would be much more closely contested. Houston won the first game at home in a shootout. The Sun won Game 2 by a score of 3‍–‍0, setting up a decisive Game 3 on September 1. This game also ended tied after regulation and overtime, but the Sun would win the shootout round this time to clinch the first USL championship. During the series, the troubled Sharp announced that he had sold the team to a group composed mainly of doctors who were also former Strikers season tickets holders.

== 1985: League Cup and league collapse ==
Though the USL tried to help teams operate within their means through strict salary caps and schedules that heavily featured regional play to reduce travel expenses, none of the teams were able to turn a profit in the first season. At its founding, the league had announced plans to stage an indoor season in the winter to promote year-round engagement with the fans, but the indoor season never materialized. Then, every team but Houston failed to meet a February deadline to post a performance bond to guarantee their return for a 1985 outdoor season, leading the Dynamos to withdraw from the league. The first division NASL was also in deep trouble, with only a few of its remaining nine teams willing to commit to another outdoor season. A last-ditch idea to merge the USL and NASL to salvage some form of professional outdoor soccer that summer was discussed, but USL commissioner William Burfeind announced that this merger would not go through on March 5. Within a few weeks the NASL had cancelled its upcoming season and five USL teams (including the Sun's division rivals in Charlotte and Jacksonville) folded or went dormant.

The renamed South Florida Sun were joined by only the Dallas Americans, Tulsa Tornado's (who had moved from Oklahoma City and re-branded), and an expansion team in El Paso/Juarez for the USL's 1985 season. To buy time to attract a few more members, the USL decided to re-arrange the schedule by splitting the season into two parts. In the first part of the season, the four teams would compete for the "USL Cup" in a round-robin style tournament. A 12-game regular season was to begin in late June. USL Cup play got underway on May 19, but the league's future looked bleak. Commissioner Burfeind resigned just as the games were starting. The teams in Tulsa and Dallas were both having trouble making payroll, and unpaid players in Tulsa refused to participate in one exhibition and one USL Cup game. The Sun was soon facing payroll issues of their own, but the team still managed to finish at the top of USL Cup table with a 4-2 record. As was befitting a league that had been on life support since before its first game of the season, the acting commissioner was not present when the Sun clinched the cup nor was an actual USL Cup trophy presented to them, causing Sun player-coach, Keith Weller, to proclaim "There ain't no cup." Despite the fact that the team and the league were barely hanging on, the Sun's front office attempted to proceed as though it was business as usual, even managing to sign former New York Cosmos and Dutch national team star Johan Neeskens to a three-year contract in mid-June. On June 22, with no new teams having joined the league, the Sun began regular season play at home against Dallas. The 3-1 victory would turn out to be the final USL game and the only league game in which Neeskens would suit up for South Florida (despite the "three-year contract," he would never receive an official paycheck). Before the Sun's next scheduled match, creditors foreclosed on the league and locked officials out of their offices. The USL voted to suspend play on June 25.

Following the league’s collapse, the Sun were the only USL club that did not immediately fold. Desperate to keep professional soccer alive in the area, the ownership group scrambled to find new financial backing while the coaches worked to schedule exhibition matches that they hoped would earn enough money to make up the back pay owed to the team and sustain them through the summer. A cancelled July 2 exhibition against the U.S. National Team was replaced with a game against the Topez-Haitian All-Stars of Miami on July 4, and plans were made to host the Minnesota Strikers two days later. However, the Sun was unable to raise the money needed to pay for the Strikers' travel and lodging, and the game against the Topez-Haitian All-Stars, which served as a warm-up act for the town's Independence Day fireworks, would be the only game that the team would participate in as an independent club. The Sun rallied to win 4–3 before a crowd of 3,529. The morning after the game, the Sun players, who had not received their full paychecks since May 31, voted on how to equitably distribute the net proceeds from the gate amongst the players and remaining staff. Team owners soon came to grips with the fact that the organization simply did not have the means to carry on. They officially announced the suspension of operations a few days later, and the players began to disperse back into everyday life.

=== Florida Derby ===
On June 27, 1984 the Sun made their only appearance in the Florida Derby, falling to the Tampa Bay Rowdies, 5–1, in an inter-league friendly. Two more derby matches were planned for in 1985, but the Sun closed up shop before those games could materialize.

== Honors ==
Champion

- 1984

USL Invitational Cup

- 1985

Rookie of the Year

- Mark Schwartz 1984

Top Goalkeeper

- Jim Tietjens 1984

== Year-by-year ==
Year	Team Name	Division	League	Reg. season	Playoffs	League Cup	National Cup
1984	Fort Lauderdale Sun	2	USL	1st, Southern (15–9)	Champions	none	Did not enter
1985	South Florida Sun	2	USL	1st (1–0)	none	Champions (4–2)	Did not enter

=== 1985 USL League Cup standings ===
Place	1985 League Cup	GP	W	T	L	GF	GA	%	Avg. Att.
1	South Florida Sun	6	4	0	2	9	8	.667	2,195
2	Dallas Americans	6	3	0	3	12	9	.500	2,400
3	Tulsa Tornado's	6	3	0	3	7	7	.500	500
4	El Paso/Juarez Gamecocks	6	2	0	4	10	15	.333	1,430

=== 1985 team scoring leaders* ===
USL Rank	Scorer	GP	Goals	Assists	Points
2(tied)	Hassan Nazari	5	3	1	4
7	Wolfgang Rausch	5	1	2	3
9	Tom Fazekas	5	3	0	3

=== 1985 team goalkeeping stats* ===
USL Rank	Player	GP	W–L	Min	SH	SV	SO	GA	GAA
2	Jim Tietjens	6	4–2	540	75	21	1	8	1.33

*USL cup only

== See also ==
- Fort Lauderdale Strikers (1977–1983)
- Fort Lauderdale Strikers (1988–94)
- Fort Lauderdale Strikers (1994–1997)
- Miami Fusion Now defunct MLS team (1997–2001)
- Fort Lauderdale Strikers -of Div. 2 NASL, originally named Miami FC
- Fort Lauderdale–Tampa Bay rivalry
