= Dallas Inter =

American soccer club

The Dallas Express was an American soccer club based in Dallas, Texas that was a member of the Lone Star Soccer Alliance.

The team began its existence as the Dallas Mean Green, a local, unaffiliated team which competed at the amateur level. In 1984, it won the National Amateur Cup. In 1987, The Mean Green entered the Lone Star Soccer Alliance under the name Dallas Express. They resumed their original name the next season, but in 1989, became known as F.C. Dallas. In their final season, the team was known as Dallas Inter.

== Year-by-year ==
Year	Division	League	Reg. season	Playoffs	Amateur Cup	National Cup
1984	N/A	N/A	N/A	N/A	Champion	
1985	N/A	N/A	N/A	N/A		
1986	N/A	N/A	N/A	N/A		
1987	N/A	LSSA	1st	Champion (no playoff)		Semifinal
1988 National Amateur Cup Champions	N/A	LSSA	1st	Champion	Champion	Semifinal
1989	N/A	LSSA	1st	Final		Quarterfinal
1990	N/A	LSSA	1st, Northern	Final		Semifinal
1991	N/A	LSSA	1st, Northern	Champion		First round
1992	N/A	LSSA	1st, Southern	Champion		Quarterfinal
