= Lone Star Soccer Alliance =

American soccer league in Texas

Lone Star Soccer Alliance was a soccer league that existed from 1987 to 1992. While most of the teams came from Texas, some also came from Oklahoma and Kansas.

== History ==
First proposed by the Houston Dynamos, on April 18, 1987, the Lone Star Soccer Alliance was formed when the Dynamos were joined by Dallas Express, San Antonio International, and Austin Thunder. The league was initially associated with the Texas State Soccer Association South. In 1989, it was approved as a regional league by the United States Soccer Federation. The LSSA was created as a regional outdoor soccer league and as a development league for the professional league that American soccer fans hoped was on the horizon.

== LSSA champions ==
Season	Champion	Series	Runner-up
1987	Dallas Express	No playoff	Houston Dynamos
1988	Dallas Mean Green	5–3	Houston Dynamos
1989	Austin Thunder	3–2	F.C. Dallas
1990	Oklahoma City Spirit	3–0	F.C. Dallas
1991	F.C. Dallas	3–3 (6–5 PKs)	Austin Thunder
1992	Dallas Inter	2–1	America F.C.

== Complete team list ==
- America F.C. (1992)
- Austin Thunder (1987–92)
- Dallas Inter (1987–92, as Dallas Express in 1987, as Dallas Mean Green in 1988, as F.C. Dallas in 1989–91)
- Houston International (1987–91, as Houston Dynamos in 1987–90)
- Houston Alianza (1988–91)
- Oklahoma City Spirit (1990–92)
- San Antonio Alamo (1987–90, as San Antonio International in 1987–89)
- San Antonio XLR8 (1992)
- Tulsa Pride (1992)
- Wichita Blue (1990–92)
- Wichita Falls Fever (1989–92)
