= Houston Dynamos =

- Full name: Houston Dynamos Soccer Team
- Nickname: The Dynamos
- Short name: Houston Dynamos
- Founded: 1984
- Dissolved: 1991
- Stadium: Houston, Texas, United States.
- League: United Soccer League, Lone Star Soccer Alliance
Home colors	Away colors	Third colors

Houston Dynamos was a U.S. soccer team that existed in various forms from 1984 to 1991. Before its final season in 1991, the team's name was changed to Houston International.

== History ==
By the winter of 1983/84, the American professional soccer boom of the 1970s had completely cooled, and the high hopes of those who felt that the sport's moment had finally arrived in the U.S. had come crashing back to Earth. Though youth and amateur participation in the sport was growing dramatically, the two main professional outdoor leagues had yet to figure out how to operate in a way that was profitable and sustainable. Both the first division North American Soccer League and the second division American Soccer League had welcomed several new markets the 1970s, but by the early 1980s the leagues were both awash in red ink, and every offseason saw multiple clubs folding or relocating.

At the ASL's annual winter meetings in January, the league found itself down to only four active teams plus one planning to re-activate from dormancy. Disagreements at those meetings over expansion plans and frustration with the league's perpetual instability and dysfunctional power structure ultimately led a pair of disgruntled owners to break away from the ASL and start laying the foundations for a new second division league to be called the United Soccer League. The USL hoped to succeed where the NASL and ASL had failed by allowing teams to operate on reasonable budgets, building a grass roots connection between clubs and their fans by employing mostly American players who would stay in town year-round to play both outdoors and indoors, and expanding gradually and carefully. The upstart league would end up attracting five clubs that were either direct defectors from the ASL or were rebooted versions of ASL clubs, and the ASL would quietly close up shop. It was in the midst of this rapidly evolving but cautiously optimistic environment that Peter Kane and John M. Gaughan would establish the Houston Dynamos as one of the four new clubs that would also be playing in the USL that summer.

== 1984: United Soccer League ==
The Dynamos joined the Oklahoma City Stampede and Dallas Americans in the Southwest Division of the USL for its debut season. The franchise hired Gary Hindley to be its first coach, and the former Pennsylvania Stoners assistant convinced eight players from that squad to join him in Texas after the news broke that the Stoners would not be fielding a team in 1984. They also signed Brazilian forward Jose Neto, an impactful veteran of teams in the ASL, MISL and NASL. Houston finished second in its division with a 13-11 record and qualified for the playoffs as a wild card team. In the wild card game, the Dynamos knocked off Dallas 2-1, and in the best-of-three semifinals, they swept the top-seeded Stampede. In the final round, their surprising quest for a championship came up just short as the Fort Lauderdale Sun beat them two games to one in a closely contested series in which the first and third games were both decided by shootouts. When end-of-season honors were announced, Neto was named the league's Most Valuable Player, Hindley was named Coach of the Year, and Peter Kane won the Executive of the Year award.

== 1985: Independent ==
Despite the steps that the USL had taken to help its teams live within their means such as a mostly regional schedule to reduce travel costs and a league-imposed salary cap, its franchises had all lost money during the first season, and its future looked bleak. The indoor season discussed at the league's founding never came to fruition, so revenues dried up almost completely once the outdoor season ended. In February, Peter Kane, who was also the chair of the USL's Executive Committee, asked all owners to post a $50,000 performance bond to demonstrate that they had the means to participate in another outdoor season. When the Dynamos were the only team able to raise the money on time, their leadership decided to withdraw from the league.

Houston's choice looked prescient that June when the USL, which only fielded four teams for its 1985 season, was forced to abruptly shut down after a chaotic seven weeks of play in which all of its members ran out of money, games were cancelled when unpaid players refused to dress, and creditors foreclosed on the bankrupt league office. The Dynamos, on the other hand, were able to schedule and complete a slate of exhibition games that ran the whole summer. Thanks to the efforts of new general manager Jim Walker and the financial support of their owners, the Dynamos were able to play games against (among others) the U.S. National Team, touring international sides Sheffield United, Guadalajara, Linfield, and Glentoran, the MISL's Cleveland Force, and teams like the Tulsa Roughnecks who were gamely trying to carry on after the NASL cancelled its 1985 season. During a period when the last few professional outdoor teams left in the country were routinely missing pay periods and/or collapsing mid-season, the Dynamos stood out as a stable organization with solid backing that took care of its players.

1984 and 1985 rosters

== 1986-1991: Amateur ==
The mid-season collapse of the United Soccer League in 1985 and the failure of the North American Soccer League to return in 1986 as they had initially promised left the United States without a professional outdoor soccer league for the first time in over 50 years. Dynamos ownership decided that it no longer made sense to run the operation as a professional club when there was little hope for the creation of a stable league in the immediate future. Rather than shutting down altogether, though, they re-organized to become a developmental program for top amateur players. Amidst this low point in American soccer, the organization's spirits got a lift on May 24, 1986, when the club arranged for Pelé to come to their exhibition game against the U.S. National Team at Delmar Stadium. The Brazilian legend participated in a ceremonial opening kick, spent time posing for pictures with local youth teams and gave hundreds of Houston area soccer enthusiasts a thrilling memory.

This new version of the Dynamos also joined a regional amateur league that summer. This league was a precursor of the Lone Star Soccer Alliance, which formally began play (with the Dynamos as a founding member) in 1987. Operations during this period were decidedly modest, but Peter Kane, John Gaughan and Jim Walker remained committed to the idea that this kind of grass roots development was essential to making soccer a more widely embraced part of American culture. Walker in particular became well known for his dedication to helping soccer grow in the Houston area, and he regularly hosted or participated in camps and clinics while also serving as LSSA president. The Dynamos would finish as league runners-up in 1987 and 1988 and would play in the LSSA every summer until they folded (though they were known as Houston International during their final season in 1991).

== Postscript ==
Though the Major League Soccer team that now calls Houston home is Houston Dynamo FC, this team does not have a direct connection to the original Dynamos franchise. The current club's owners followed the trend of MLS teams borrowing naming practices from European clubs (in this case, several clubs with the word "Dynamo" in their names such as FC Dynamo Kyiv) while also honoring Houston's reputation as "the energy capital of the world." However, the owners were aware and pleased that it was simultaneously a nod to one part of the city's soccer history when they settled on the name.

The original "Dynamos" name and their logo more directly live on in Houston (at a smaller scale) thanks to the Cy-Fair Youth Soccer Club's "Dynamos Select" program, which was founded in 1990 when Jim Walker was hired by that club as their Director of Training. To this day, the program's teams sport the original Dynamos logo (in a different color scheme) superimposed on an outline of Texas.

== Year-by-year ==
Year	League	Reg. season	Playoffs	U.S. Open Cup
1984	USL	2nd, Southwest	Finals	Did not enter
1985	Independent	N/A		Did not qualify
1986	Amateur	N/A		Did not qualify
1987	LSSA	2nd	Finals	Did not enter
1988	LSSA	2nd	Finals	Did not enter
1989	LSSA	3rd	Semifinals	Did not enter
1990	LSSA	4th, Southern	Did not qualify	Did not enter
1991	LSSA	3rd, Southern	Did not qualify	
