= List of NCAA Division I men's soccer season goals leaders =

In association football, or soccer, scoring a goal is the only method of scoring. In National Collegiate Athletic Association (NCAA) Division I soccer, there is no formal award for a golden boot, which indicates the top goalscorer in American college soccer for the season. Despite this, the NCAA keeps record of the season goalscoring leader by season.

From 1959 to 1971, there were no classifications to the NCAA nor its predecessor, the Intercollegiate Soccer Football Association (ISFA). Then, from 1972 to 1973, colleges were classified as either "NCAA University Division (Major College)" or "NCAA College Division (Small College)". Since 1974, the NCAA has been broken down into three divisions.

Below is a list of the NCAA Division I men's soccer season goals leaders since the NCAA sponsored men's soccer in 1959.

== Key ==
Pos.	FW	MF	DF	GPG	Ref.
Position	Forward	Midfielder	Defender	Goals per game	References

Class (Cl.) key
Fr	Freshman	So	Sophomore	Jr	Junior	Sr	Senior

^	Player still competing in NCAA Division I
*	Elected to the National Soccer Hall of Fame
Player (X)	Denotes the number of times the player had been the scoring leader up to and including that season

== List ==
Season	Player	Pos.	Cl.	Team	GP	GS	GPG	Ref.
1959	Walter Chyzowych*	MF	So.	Temple	14	25	1.79	
1960	Herb Schmidt	FW	Jr.	Rutgers	13	33	2.54	
1961	Pete Milich	FW	Jr.	Akron	14	31	2.43	
1962								
1963	Carl Gentile	FW		Saint Louis	14	30	2.14	
1964								
1965	Dov Markus	FW	Sr.	LIU Brooklyn	14	35	2.50	
1966								
1967	Charlie Duccilli	FW	Sr.	Temple	14	23	1.64	
1968								
1969	Manuel Hernandez			San Jose State	13	26		
1970	Shoa Agonafer			UCLA	15	23		
1971	Sergio Velasquez	FW		UCLA	15	24		
1972	Jose Almeyda			Wright State	12	25	2.08	
1973	Jack Cardosa			West Virginia	17	29		
1974								
1975	Bob Rohrbach			Dayton	14	31		
1976	Angelo DiBernardo	FW	Fr.	Indiana				
1977								
1978	Thompson Usiyan	FW	So.	Appalachian State	13	34		
1979	Bjørn Tronstad	FW	Fr.	San Francisco	26	29		
1980	Thompson Usiyan	FW	Sr.	Appalachian State	17	45	2.65	
1981	Damien Kelly	FW	So.	Eastern Illinois	23	24	1.04	
1982	Michael King			Fairleigh Dickinson	21	31		
1983	Mark Erwin			Wake Forest	21	36		
1984	Sam Okpodu				19	29		
1985								
1986	David Doyle			Campbell	20	34		
1987	Ken Snow	FW	Fr.	Indiana	25	28	1.12	
1988	Ken Snow (2)	FW	So.	Indiana	22	22	1.00	
1989	Ken Snow (3)	FW	Jr.	Indiana	22	20	0.91	
1990								
1991	Mike Gailey*		Sr.	UNC Greensboro	21	25		
1992	Robert Ukrop		Jr.	Davidson	27	31		
1993	Jimmy Glenn			Clemson	24	32		
1994								
1995								
1996								
1997								
1998	Wojtek Krakowiak	MF	Jr.	Clemson	24	31	1.29	
1999	Conor Casey	FW	Fr.	Portland	18	23	1.28	
2000	Chris Carrieri	FW	Jr.	North Carolina	24	25	1.04	
2001	Dipsy Selolwane	FW	Sr.	Saint Louis	20	25	1.25	
2002	Joseph Ngwenya	FW	So.	Coastal Carolina	24	27	1.13	
2003	Joseph Ngwenya (2)	FW	Jr.	Coastal Carolina	22	21	0.95	
2004	Jason Garey	FW	Jr.	Maryland	25	22	0.88	
2004	Ryan Pore	FW	Jr.	Tulsa	23	22	0.96	
2005	Jason Garey (2)	FW	Sr.	Maryland	25	22	0.88	
2006	Joseph Lapira	FW	Jr.	Notre Dame	23	22	0.96	
2007	O'Brian White	FW	Jr.	Connecticut	24	23	0.96	
2008	Steve Zakuani	FW	So.	Akron	23	20	0.87	
2009	Teal Bunbury	FW	So.	Akron	25	17	0.68	
2010	Corey Hertzog	FW	Jr.	Penn State	22	20	0.91	
2011	Ashton Bennett	FW	Sr.	Coastal Carolina	22	23	1.05	
2012	Chris Thomas	FW	Sr.	Elon	22	23	1.05	
2013	Patrick Mullins	FW	Jr.	Maryland	26	19	0.73	
2014	Cameron Porter	FW	Sr.	Princeton	17	15	0.88	
2014	Neco Brett	FW	Jr.	Robert Morris	18	15	0.83	
2014	Andy Craven	FW	Sr.	North Carolina	22	15	0.68	
2015	David Olsen	FW	Sr.	Seattle	23	16	0.70	
2015	Gordon Wild	FW	Fr.	USC Upstate	15	16	1.07	
2016	Albert Ruiz	FW	Sr.	Florida Gulf Coast	20	22	1.10	
2017	Niklas Brodacki	FW	So.	Central Arkansas	21	17	0.81	
2018	Andre Shinyashiki	FW	Sr.	Denver	21	28	1.33	
2019	Robbie Robinson	FW	Jr.	Clemson	19	18	0.95	
2019	Thibaut Jacquel	FW	So.	Campbell	21	18	0.86	
2020	Gloire Amanda	FW	Jr.	Oregon State	14	15	1.07	
2021	Nick Markanich	FW	Sr.	Northern Illinois	20	16	0.80	
2022	Duncan McGuire	FW	Sr.	Creighton	24	23	0.96	
2023	Charlie Sharp	FW	Sr.	Western Michigan	20	19	0.95	
2024	Emil Jääskeläinen	FW	Sr.	Akron	21	23	1.10	
2025	Donavan Phillip	FW	Jr.	NC State	22	19	0.86	
