= 1985 United Soccer League season =

United Soccer League
- Season: 1985
- Teams: 4
- Champions: Season canceled
- League Cup winner: South Florida Sun
- Matches: 13
- Goals: 42 (3.23 per match)
- Top goalscorer: Josue Portillo (8 goals)
- Matches played includes 12 League Cup and 1 regular season

The 1985 USL season was the United Soccer League's second and final season. The season was abruptly suspended after the pre-season League Cup and one regular season game.

== History ==
The United Soccer League played its first season in 1984 as the de facto United States second division. The previous second division, the American Soccer League, had been unstable and barely surviving for several years by the end of its 1983 season, and two of its owners broke away in January 1984 to form the United Soccer League as a fiscally sound replacement. The USL played the 1984 season with nine teams in three divisions, but all of those teams lost money, and most failed to post a performance bond to commit to another season the following winter. In February 1985, USL leadership participated in merger talks with the North American Soccer League (which also found itself with only a few clubs willing to commit to another season) to try to salvage some form of professional outdoor soccer, but on March 5, USL Commissioner William Burfeind announced the merger would not take place. The NASL cancelled its 1985 season shortly afterwards, and five of the USL franchises (the New York Nationals, Charlotte Gold, Jacksonville Tea Men, Buffalo Storm and Rochester Flash) went dormant or folded while the Houston Dynamos withdrew to become independent. This left only the Dallas Americans, South Florida Sun (formerly Fort Lauderdale Sun), Tulsa Tornado's (who had previously been the Oklahoma City Stampede but had moved in December) and the expansion El Paso/Juarez Gamecocks committed to a 1985 season.

== The 1985 Season ==
The season was scheduled to run from May 19 through August 24. By mid-May, league officials had extensively revamped the schedule. In hopes of attracting a few more members before the second half of the season, they decided to open with a round-robin set of games in which the teams would play each other twice (once at home and once away) to compete for the "USL Cup." After a short break, the league planned to continue with a twelve-game regular season. Almost immediately, there were signs that multiple teams and the league itself were in serious financial distress. Commissioner Burfeind resigned and league vice president Kalman Csapo replaced him just as USL Cup play was starting. The Tulsa Tornado's owners were facing lawsuits related to payment for stadium rent, and after one round of paychecks bounced, they started missing pay periods for players and coaches altogether. The unpaid squad refused to play in a scheduled home exhibition on June 6th or travel to Dallas for a USL Cup match on June 8th, and the head coach and several players left the team. At the same time Dallas had to grant its players a stock participation program and pay back-salaries to keep their team afloat, and the South Florida Sun began missing pay periods for its players as well.

In June, an Oklahoma-based group of investors led by former University of Oklahoma and professional football player Jimbo Elrod and country singer Sammie Jo Cole made an offer to purchase majority control of the Tulsa franchise and take additional steps to rescue the failing league, and this allowed the Tornado's to piece together a roster and fund the travel to Fort Lauderdale for the last game of the Cup round on June 15. The Sun would prevail 1-0 in this game to clinch the best record and lay claim to the cup, but acting commissioner Csapo was not at the game nor was there a physical trophy on hand to present to the winners. Within days El Paso/Juarez owner, Pedro Meneses, announced that he was dropping out of the league. He paid all debts through the end of June and released his players. Only the thin possibility of a new ownership group taking over the Gamecocks tenuously kept the team in the league.

=== Final USL match ===
In what should have been the start of the regular season, the Sun rallied to defeat Dallas, 3–1, on Saturday, June 22. It turned out to be the USL's swan song. The Gamecocks/Tornado's match scheduled for the same night was cancelled due to ongoing payroll and stadium rent issues in Tulsa. South Florida were scheduled to host El Paso/Juarez on June 26. Instead on the evening of June 25, the league voted to suspend the remainder of the season. Once this decision was made, Elrod and Cole withdrew their offer to invest in the league, and the last outdoor soccer league in the U.S. found itself out of options and out of business.

June 22, 1985
8:05 EDT

South Florida Sun (FL)	3–1	Dallas Americans (TX)
Rongen (yellow card) 20:19'; Bandov 74:34', 90:45' (Cubillas); Neeskens (Saldana) 83:57'; Christensen (yellow card) 90:10'	Report	12:42', (yellow card) 29:29' Nazari; (yellow card) 90:10' DeRouse

Lockhart Stadium, Fort Lauderdale, Florida
Attendance: 2,069

=== A last gasp in Florida ===
The suspension of the season triggered an immediate shut down for the teams from Dallas, Tulsa and El Paso/Juarez, but the Sun tried to carry on as an independent squad by scrambling to schedule exhibition games that would keep them active and generate income to help them offset their payroll debt. They managed to arrange matches with a Miami-based team of Haitian players and the Minnesota Strikers for the first week of July, but after failing to raise the funds to pay for Minnesota's travel, only the game against the Topez-Haitian All Stars was actually played. The Sun rallied to win what was to be the final game involving a USL squad, 4–3, on July 4, 1985, before a Lockhart Stadium crowd of 3,529. The match's proceeds were divvied up among the players and remaining staff, and team ownership announced the official suspension of operations a few days later.

=== USL Cup Table ===
Pos	Team	Pld	W	T	L	GF	GA	PCT	Avg. Att.
1	South Florida Sun	6	4	0	2	9	8	.667	2,195
2	Dallas Americans	6	3	0	3	12	9	.500	2,400
3	Tulsa Tornados	6	3	0	3	7	7	.500	500
4	El Paso/Juarez Gamecocks	6	2	0	4	10	15	.333	1,430

=== Scoring leaders ===
Rank	Scorer	Club	GP	Goals	Assists	Points
1	Josue Portillo	El Paso/Juarez Gamecocks	6	8	0	8
2	Mark Schwartz	South Florida Sun	5	3	1	4
2	Hassan Nazari	Dallas Americans	5	3	1	4
4	Boris Bandov	South Florida Sun	6	0	4	4
5	Teófilo Cubillas	South Florida Sun	2	1	2	3
6	Zequinha	Tulsa Tornados	4	1	2	3
7	Wolfgang Rausch	Dallas Americans	5	1	2	3
8	Miguel Carcamo	El Paso/Juarez Gamecocks	5	0	3	3
9	Tom Fazekas	Dallas Americans	5	3	0	3
10	Arnaldo Correa	El Paso/Juarez Gamecocks	6	2	1	3
11	Tony Crescitelli	South Florida Sun	6	2	1	3

=== Goalkeeping leaders ===
Player	Club	GP	W–L	Min	SH	SV	SO	GA	GAA
Delroy Allen	Tulsa Tornados	5	3–2	434	60	17	0	6	1.24
Jim Tietjens	South Florida Sun	6	4–2	540	75	21	1	8	1.33
Randy Phillips	Dallas Americans	5	2–3	470	62	16	1	9	1.72
Juan Carlos Villalobos	El Paso/Juarez Gamecocks	5	2–3	470	73	17	1	13	2.49
Leroy Alexandre	El Paso/Juarez Gamecocks	1	0–1	90	9	–	0	2	2.00
