= Jim Millinder =

American soccer player and coach

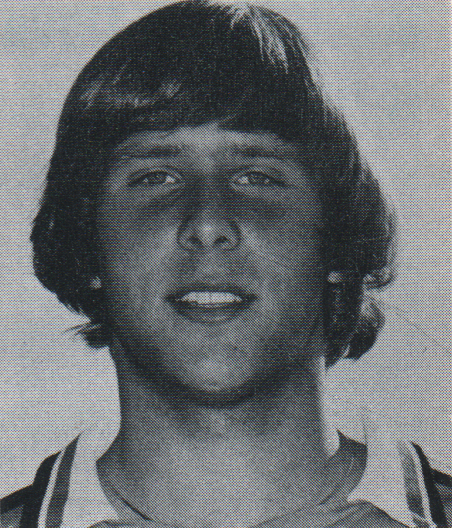
- Millinder in 1979

Personal information
- Date of birth: November 27, 1958 (age 67)
- Place of birth: Salina, Kansas, U.S.
- Height: 5 ft 10 in (1.78 m)
- Positions: Midfielder; defender

College career
Years	Team	Apps	(Gls)
1976–1977	El Camino College		

Senior career*
Years	Team	Apps	(Gls)
1978	New York Cosmos	0	(0)
1979	Los Angeles Aztecs	4	(0)
1979–1980	Tulsa Roughnecks (indoor)	5	(0)
1980–1981	Fort Lauderdale Strikers	0	(0)
1982–1983	Oklahoma City Slickers		
1983–1985	Los Angeles Lazers (indoor)	34	(2)
1984	Oklahoma City Stampede		
1985	Tulsa Tornados		
1990	San Diego Nomads		

International career
1976	U.S. U-20		

Managerial career
- 1978–1989: El Camino College (assistant)
- 1990–1993: El Camino College (women)
- 1992–1993: El Camino College (men)
- 1994–1995: Loyola Marymount Lions (women)
- 1996–2006: USC Trojans (women)
- 2013–2023: San Francisco Dons (women)
- * Club domestic league appearances and goals

Jim Millnder is an American retired soccer player and coach who played professionally in the North American Soccer League and Major Indoor Soccer League, American Soccer League and United Soccer League. He coached collegiate soccer for twenty-nine years.

== Player ==
Millinder graduated from North Torrance High School. He then played soccer at El Camino College where he was a 1977 Junior College All American. He was inducted into the El Camino Athletic Hall of Fame in 1992. In 1978, he turned professional with the New York Cosmos of the North American Soccer League. He saw no first team games and in 1978, he moved to the Los Angeles Aztecs. He played four games for the Aztecs then was sent to the Tulsa Roughnecks for the 1979–1980 NASL indoor season. In June 1980, the Roughnecks sent Millinder and cash to the Fort Lauderdale Strikers in exchange for David Irving. He played no games for the Strikers before being released. In 1982, he joined the Oklahoma City Slickers of the American Soccer League. He was a 1983 ASL All Star with the Slickers. That fall, he signed with the Los Angeles Lazers of the Major Indoor Soccer League. He spent two indoor seasons with the Lazers. In 1984, he spent the summer with the Oklahoma City Stampede of the United Soccer League. In 1985, he played for the Tulsa Tornados. In 1990, he briefly played for the San Diego Nomads of the American Professional Soccer League.

In 1976, Millinder played for the United States U-20 men's national soccer team during its unsuccessful qualification campaign for the 1977 FIFA World Youth Championship.

== Coach ==
In 1978, Millinder became an assistant coach to both the men's and women's soccer teams at El Camino College. In 1987, he was the interim head coach of the men's team as it won the California Junior College State Championship. In 1990, he was elevated to the position of head coach of the women's team and took the team to the 1990 California Junior College State Championship. He finished his tenure with a 66–8–16 record. He also coached the men's team during the 1992 and 1993 seasons to a 43–9–17 record. In 1994, Millinder became the head coach at Loyola Marymount University. He compiled am 8–27–4 record over two seasons. In May 1996, the University of Southern California hired Millinder as the head coach of the women's soccer team. On November 16, 2006, the university announced it would not renew Millinder's contract. He had compiled a 136–70–21 record, but had never taken a team past the second round of the NCAA post-season tournament. Millender became head coach of the University of San Francisco in 2012.

Millinder has also coached numerous amateur teams including Ajax, the 1992 U.S. Women's Amateur National Champion.
