= Neil Cohen =

American professional soccer player (born 1955)

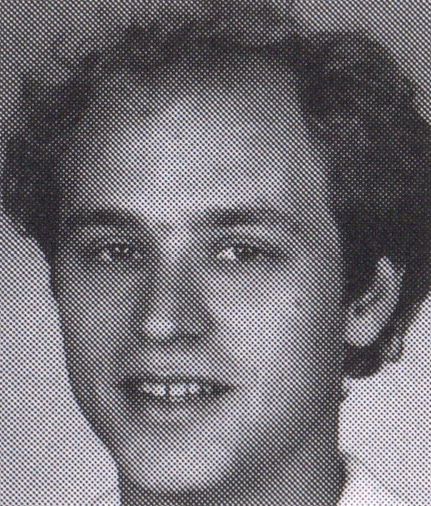
- Cohen circa 1984

Personal information
- Date of birth: September 12, 1955 (age 71)
- Place of birth: Dallas, Texas, United States
- Height: 6 ft 2 in (1.88 m)
- Position: Defender

Senior career*
Years	Team	Apps	(Gls)
1974–1978	Dallas Tornado	71	(0)
1979	Tulsa Roughnecks	3	(0)
1979	San Jose Earthquakes	5	(1)
1979–1980	Houston Summit (indoor)	27	(2)
1980–1981	Baltimore Blast (indoor)	34	(5)
1981	Dallas Tornado	32	(2)
1981–1982	Denver Avalanche (indoor)	43	(1)
1982–1984	St. Louis Steamers (indoor)	62	(1)
1983–1985	Dallas Americans		
1984–1985	Dallas Sidekicks (indoor)	13	(0)

International career
1976	United States	1	(0)
- * Club domestic league appearances and goals

Neil Cohen (born September 12, 1955, in Dallas, Texas) is a former U.S. soccer defender. He played eight seasons in the North American Soccer League and six in the Major Indoor Soccer League. He also earned one cap with the U.S. national team in 1976. In 2008, Neil was elected to the FC Dallas, "Texans Credit Union Walk of Fame" for his contributions to soccer in Texas.

== Player ==
=== Youth ===
Cohen grew up in Dallas, Texas, graduating from Bryan Adams High School in 1973. He was the first high school All American soccer player from Texas in 1973. He played for the internationally renowned Texas Longhorns Soccer Club.

=== Professional ===
In 1974, he signed with the Dallas Tornado of the North American Soccer League (NASL). He played five seasons with the Tornado before moving to the Tulsa Roughnecks in 1979. He played only three games before moving to the San Jose Earthquakes. He sat out the 1980 season with injuries, but returned to the Tornado for the 1981 season. The Tornado folded at the end of the season. When the Tornado folded in 1981, Cohen was already established in the Major Indoor Soccer League. In 1979, he signed with the Houston Summit. The team moved to Baltimore following the 1979–1980 season, changing its name to the Baltimore Blast. Cohen played one season in Baltimore before moving to the Denver Avalanche for the 1981–1982 season. When the Avalanche folded, Cohen moved to the St. Louis Steamers for two seasons before signing with the Dallas Sidekicks as a free agent on July 19, 1984. He injured his knee on December 30, 1984, which put him out for the rest of the season. He retired on September 24, 1985. In 1983, Cohen also played for the Dallas Americans of the American Soccer League in 1983 and the United Soccer League in 1984 and 1985.

=== National team ===
Cohen began playing with the U.S. junior teams in 1974, taking part in the failed qualification campaign for the 1976 Summer Olympics. He went on to play for the U.S. at the 1975 Pan American Games. The U.S. went 0–2 in group play and did not qualify for the second round. He was the first American player to represent his country at all three levels: Youth, Olympic and National Team. On October 3, 1976, Cohen earned his lone cap with the U.S. national team in a scoreless tie with Mexico in a World Cup qualification game. He started, then came off for Santiago Formoso in the 80th minute.

== Coach ==
Cohen coached youth soccer in the Dallas area with Texas Longhorns Soccer Club, FC Lynx and Solar Soccer Club. He received his USSF "B" license at the age of 18 from National Team Coach Dettmar Cramer. He retired in 2006 from youth soccer.

Also at the time in 1973, he was the youngest American player ever signed into the North American Soccer League at the age of 18. He made his debut at the age of 18 vs the St. Louis Stars in Busch Stadium.
