= Wolfgang Rausch =

German footballer (1947–2025)

Personal information
- Date of birth: 30 April 1947
- Place of birth: Aachen, North Rhine-Westphalia, Germany
- Date of death: 10 May 2025 (aged 78)
- Height: 1.77 m (5 ft 10 in)
- Position: Defender

Senior career*
Years	Team	Apps	(Gls)
1965–1968	1. FC Köln	47	(0)
1968–1974	Rot-Weiss Essen		
1974–1977	Kickers Offenbach	103	(21)
1977–1979	Bayern Munich	51	(3)
1979–1981	Dallas Tornado	82	(17)
1979–1980	Detroit Lightning (indoor)	27	(21)
1980–1981	Dallas Tornado (indoor)	17	(21)
1981–1982	New Jersey Rockets (indoor)	44	(32)
1982	Oklahoma City Slickers		
1983–1985	Dallas Americans		

International career
1967	West Germany U-23	2	(0)

Managerial career
- 1982: Oklahoma City Slickers (assistant)
- 1983–1985: Dallas Americans
- * Club domestic league appearances and goals

Wolfgang Rausch (30 April 1947 – 10 May 2025) was a German professional footballer who played as a defender. He made a total of 257 appearances in the Bundesliga during his playing career.

== Career ==
Rausch was born in Aachen. In 1979, he left Germany for the United States where he signed with the Dallas Tornado of the North American Soccer League. Rausch played three outdoor and one indoor seasons with the Tornado. While with the Tornado, he also played the 1979–1980 Major Indoor Soccer League season on loan with the Detroit Lightning. In the fall of 1981, Rausch left the Tornado and signed with the New Jersey Rockets of the MISL. In 1982, he moved back outdoors with the Oklahoma City Slickers of the second division American Soccer League at the request of head coach Brian Harvey, an ex-teammate from the Tornado. During his season in Oklahoma, Rausch was also an assistant coach. After one season, he joined the newly established Dallas Americans as a player-coach. The ASL collapsed after the 1983 season and the Americans moved to the United Soccer League for the 1984 and 1985 seasons.

== Death ==
On 10 May 2025, Rausch died at the age of 78.
