= Bill Sautter =

American soccer player and golfer

Personal information
- Date of birth: March 5, 1958 (age 68)
- Place of birth: Abington, Pennsylvania, United States
- Height: 6 ft 1 in (1.85 m)
- Positions: Defender; forward

Youth career
- 1973: Abington High School

College career
Years	Team	Apps	(Gls)
1974–1977	Temple Owls		

Senior career*
Years	Team	Apps	(Gls)
1978–1979	Tulsa Roughnecks	40	(6)
1979–1980	Los Angeles Aztecs (indoor)	9	(4)
1980–1982	San Jose Earthquakes	16	(1)
1980–1981	San Jose Earthquakes (indoor)	36	(5)
1981	Pennsylvania Stoners		
1982–1983	Oklahoma City Slickers		
1982–1983	Golden Bay Earthquakes (indoor)		
1984	Oklahoma City Stampede		
1985	Tulsa Tornados		
- * Club domestic league appearances and goals

Bill Sautter (born March 5, 1958) is an American former soccer player who played professionally in the North American Soccer League, Major Indoor Soccer League, American Soccer League and United Soccer League.

== Family ==
Bill Sautter Sr. has three children. His oldest son is named H. Sautter Jr. His only daughter is named Katherine Emma Sautter,. His youngest son is named Jimmy Sautter.

== Soccer ==
=== Youth ===
In 1974, Sautter graduated from Abington High School where he was a 1973 All State soccer player. He was inducted into the Abington High School Hall of Fame in 1992. He then attended Temple University where he played on the men's soccer team from 1974 to 1977. He was a 1975 Honorable Mention (third team) and a 1976 and 1977 Second Team All American.

=== Professional ===
In 1978, he turned professional with the Tulsa Roughnecks of the North American Soccer League. He set a league record by scoring three goals in his first four shots on goal. In the fall of 1979, he moved to the Los Angeles Aztecs for the 1979–1980 NASL indoor season. In the spring of 1980, he moved to the San Jose Earthquakes, but was released early in the 1981 season. He then signed with the Pennsylvania Stoners of the American Soccer League. In 1982, he joined the Oklahoma City Slickers of the American Soccer League. In July 1983, the league indefinitely suspended him after he assaulted a referee who had just ejected him from a game against the Pennsylvania Stoners. In 1984, he played for the Oklahoma City Stampede in the United Soccer League. In 1985, he played for the Tulsa Tornados.

== Golf ==
Sautter began playing golf when he was 30. He now is the golf instructor at the Philadelphia Cricket Club and has played in a few Champions Tour events.
