= Oklahoma City Slickers =

The Oklahoma City Slickers was the name given to two different American soccer clubs based in Oklahoma City. The first team competed in the second American Soccer League in 1982 and 1983. The club was re-organized and re-branded in 1984 as the Oklahoma City Stampede and again in 1985 as the Tulsa Tornado's to play in the short-lived United Soccer League. The second Oklahoma City Slickers competed in the USISL from 1993 to 1996. Home games (for all outdoor seasons except 1985) were played at historical Taft Stadium in Oklahoma City.

== Oklahoma City Slickers (1982–83) ==
In 1982, the Oklahoma City Slickers were one of two new clubs to join the long-standing but struggling American Soccer League (at the time the unofficial 2nd division league in the US). Head coach Brian Harvey and General Manager Jim Walker assembled a team that was composed largely of young Americans but that was bolstered by a handful of older English and German players who had experience playing in top European leagues, including Wolfgang Rausch, Phil Parkes and Jeff Bourne. Among this mix were a number of capable players who had spent time in the top division North American Soccer League but had found themselves squeezed out as the league had shrunk by ten teams since 1980, and they began to make waves in the smaller pond of the ASL fairly quickly. After an uneven start, the squad found its footing, surprising many on their way to a regular season record of 19–3–6 (good for 2nd best in the league). They entered the playoffs on an eleven-game win streak and cruised through the first round against the Carolina Lightnin’. In the best-of-three championship round, they beat the Detroit Express at the Pontiac Silverdome in the first game; however, they failed to capitalize on their chance to close out the series at home in Game 2 and went on to lose the deciding Game 3 in Detroit. Brian Harvey and Jim Walker were named the league's coach and GM of the year.

In 1983, the Slickers faced changes and turmoil on and off of the field. The year began with Jim Walker being fired in January. The team also lost several key players during the offseason, with Wolfgang Rausch leaving to become a player-coach for the expansion Dallas Americans, who also snapped up three other starters from the ‘82 squad (including leading scorer Jeff Bourne). Then, just as the season was getting underway, news emerged that majority owner Ralph Penn had been stripped of many assets, including his shares in the team, due to a variety of legal and financial troubles. The shares were placed into court-appointed receivership and then sold at auction. The players and coaches who remained had to endure missed paychecks and uncertainty about whether the club would last through the season, and the team started 0–8. Local businessman David Fraser began providing cash to help the club meet its financial obligations and was awarded majority control, and Walker returned to the front office to help stabilize the floundering franchise. Their efforts allowed the players and coaches to focus on soccer, and the team began to find ways to win some games; however, they still finished the season with a league worst 7–17 record.

When Fraser returned his shares to the minority owners in November, citing unsustainable out of pocket spending and an overwhelming level of debt that the club was still carrying, it appeared that Oklahoma City's first experience with professional soccer was coming to an end. But when the remaining American Soccer League owners held their annual meetings in January 1984, the owners of the Jacksonville Tea Men and Dallas Americans decided to break from the slowly dying ASL and form a new league they would name the United Soccer League. Fraser saw in the USL a chance to try his hand at team ownership again without the red ink he had inherited in taking over the Slickers. He revived much of the Slickers' operation in order to found a new franchise, the Oklahoma City Stampede.

=== Year-by-year ===
Year	Division	League	Reg. season	Playoffs	National Cup
1982	2	ASL	2nd	Finals	Did not enter
1983	2	ASL	3rd, Western	Did not qualify	Did not enter

=== Notable players ===
- Jeff Bourne (1982)
- Phil Parkes (1982–83)
- Bill Sautter (1982–83)
- Austin Hudson (1982–83)
- Jim Millinder (1982–83)
- Tom Alioto (1982–83)
- Peter Knezic (1982–83)
- Rudy Pena (1983)
- Delroy Allen (1983)

== Oklahoma City Stampede/Tulsa Tornado's (1984-85) ==
Oklahoma City Stampede (Logo)

Though the name and colors of town's pro soccer team were different heading into the 1984 season (black and gold was replaced with red and white), fans of the Slickers from the previous two summers would have been familiar with the majority of the Stampede's roster as well as GM Walker and coach Harvey. Seasoned forwards David Kemp and Thompson Usiyan came over from the NASL and provided a significant offensive boost to this young core of former Slickers when they finished 2nd and 3rd in league scoring, respectively. Goalkeeper Delroy Allen posted a 1.61 Goals Against Average and three shutouts to key the defense. The revitalized club finished atop the Southwest Division and tied with the Fort Lauderdale Sun for the USL's best regular season record (15–9). The league's points system, which awarded five points for a win, two for a shootout loss and up to three bonus points per game for regulation goals, gave the Stampede the top seed heading into the playoffs. The team initially believed this meant a first-round matchup against the Buffalo Storm, who had won the Northern Division despite having a losing record, because they were the playoff qualifier with the lowest number of standings points. However, a last-minute conference call among owners clarified that the top seed should face the wild card play-in winner regardless of the standings points, and the Stampede found out just a few days before the semifinals began that they would instead be facing a much tougher and more familiar opponent in the Houston Dynamos. Despite owning a 4-2 record against Houston in the regular season, The Stampede was eliminated by the Dynamos two games to none.

The USL had plans to promote stability and increase community presence by operating its teams year-round with an indoor season in the winter, and owner David Fraser spoke early on about playing in the winter of 1984/85 in what was then Oklahoma City's largest indoor sports arena, the Myriad Convention Center. However, these plans never materialized for the team or the rest of the league, and the playoff loss to Houston on August 24 would be the last game the team would play in Oklahoma City as the Stampede. In December, Fraser announced plans to move the team to Tulsa and rename it the Tornado's (the apostrophe is not a typo), hoping to fill the void left by the folding of the NASL's Tulsa Roughnecks the previous September. But in the months following this announcement, it would become clear that despite respectable attendance figures and measures to keep salaries and costs in this new league manageable, profitability and stability would be just as elusive for the USL as it had for its predecessor, the ASL. In February a last-ditch set of USL/NASL merger discussions that hoped to bring a financial boost to the USL and a boost in membership to the flagging NASL ended without an agreement. In short order the NASL cancelled the 1985 outdoor season, and six of the nine USL teams either ended operations or withdrew from the league. Only Dallas and Fort Lauderdale (renamed South Florida) along with an expansion team in El Paso/Juarez joined Tulsa to attempt the USL's 1985 outdoor season. Further compounding the challenges of attracting fans and sponsors in a new town on short notice, the Roughnecks' former general manager, Noel Lemon, announced in January that he had received permission to use the Roughnecks name for a new squad that he was putting together for the 1985 NASL campaingn. When the NASL cancelled the season, Lemon's club announced a 20-game exhibition schedule that was to start in the same month as Tornado's games, leaving the relatively small city of Tulsa with two hastily assembled and underfunded clubs directly competing for the attention of the town's soccer fans.

The USL re-arranged its schedule to open the season in late May with a round-robin series of games to compete for the "USL Cup," with plans to have a twelve game regular season in the second half of the summer. The Tornado's organization immediately began showing signs of serious financial distress. The owners faced a lawsuit from investors related to stadium rent payments, and after not receiving pay for some time, the players boycotted a June 6 exhibition game at home and a June 8 USL Cup game in Dallas. Coach Harvey resigned and some players began to take their leave. New investors began talks to take over principal ownership from the Frasers, and they provided funding that allowed the Tornado's to piece together a roster and travel to Fort Lauderdale for the final match of the USL Cup series. However, the 1–0 loss on June 15 would be the team's swan song. The opening of Tulsa's "regular season" on June 22 was cancelled due to still unresolved stadium rent and team payroll issues. The league's other teams and the league itself were not faring any better, and a few days later creditors foreclosed on the USL and locked officials out of their offices. The season was suspended on June 25.

=== Year-by-year ===
Year	Division	League	Reg. season	Playoffs	National Cup
1984	2	USL	1st, Southwest Division	Semifinals	Did not enter
1985	2	USL	season suspended	N/A	Did not enter

=== Notable players ===
- David Kemp (1984)
- Thompson Usiyan (1984–85)
- Austin Hudson (1984)
- Jim Millinder (1984)
- Tom Alioto (1984)
- Peter Knezic (1984)
- Rudy Pena (1984)
- Carl Bennett (1984)
- Kevin Terry (1984)
- Delroy Allen (1984–85)
- Bill Sautter (1984–85)
- Zequinha (1985)
- Ricardo Alonso (1985)

== Oklahoma City Slickers (1993–96) ==
In February 1993, the United States Interregional Soccer League announced the merger of the Oklahoma City Warriors of the USISL and the Oklahoma City Spirit of the Lone Star Soccer Alliance. The new team would compete in the USISL using the name the Oklahoma City Slickers. Brian Harvey coached the Slickers in their first year with Warriors head coach Chico Villar serving as an assistant and team general manager. The team also returned to Taft Stadium. In 1994, Duane Cummings replaced Harvey as head coach. The Slickers withdrew from the league and disbanded after the 1995–96 USISL indoor season.

=== Year-by-year ===
Year	Division	League	Reg. season	Playoffs	National Cup
1994	N/A	USISL	7th, South Central	Did not qualify	Did not enter
1994–95	N/A	USISL Indoor	1st, South Central	Finals	N/A
1995	3	USISL Premier	4th, Western	First round	Did not enter
1995–96	N/A	USISL Indoor	3rd, Central	Sizzlin' Five	N/A
