= Rudy Pena =

American soccer player (born 1958)

Personal information
- Date of birth: September 17, 1958 (age 68)
- Place of birth: Dallas, Texas, U.S.
- Position: Midfielder

Youth career
- 1969–1976: Dallas Oak Cliff Pirates

Senior career*
Years	Team	Apps	(Gls)
- Dallas Tornado
1983	Oklahoma City Slickers		
1984	Oklahoma City Stampede		
1985–1986	Milwaukee Wave (indoor)	39	(5)

International career
- United States U-19
- United States U-23
- * Club domestic league appearances and goals

Rudy Pena is an American retired soccer player who played professionally in the North American Soccer League, American Soccer League and United Soccer League.

Pena graduated from Sunset High School where he was an All American. A member of the Oak Cliff Dallas Pirates. Who won the under-19 Robbie International Cup, (1976) in Toronto, Canada. He was a member of the U.S. under-19 National Team. He also played on the U.S. under 23 National team. He then played soccer at Hartwick College from 1977 to 1980. He was a member of the team which won the 1977 NCAA championship. In 1981, he played for the Dallas Tornado of the North American Soccer League. In 1983, he played for the Oklahoma City Slickers of the American Soccer League. In 1984, he played for the Oklahoma City Stampede in the United Soccer League. In 1985 he played for the Tulsa Tornados in the USL. He finished his professional career with the Milwaukee Wave in the American Indoor Soccer Association. In 2011 he was inducted to the Hartwick College Athletic Hall of Fame with the 1977 NCAA Div. I National Soccer Championship Team.
