= Jerome Friedman =

Jerome Friedman may refer to:

- Jerome Isaac Friedman (born 1930), American physicist
- Jerome B. Friedman (born 1943), United States federal judge
- Jerome H. Friedman (born 1939), American statistician
