= Dave Kemp =

English footballer (born 1953)

Personal information
- Full name: David Michael Kemp
- Date of birth: 20 February 1953 (age 73)
- Place of birth: Harrow, London, England
- Position: Forward

Senior career*
Years	Team	Apps	(Gls)
- Harrow Borough
- Maidenhead United
1973–1975	Slough Town	50	(41)
1975–1976	Crystal Palace	35	(10)
1976–1978	Portsmouth	64	(32)
1978–1979	Carlisle United	61	(22)
1979–1982	Plymouth Argyle	84	(39)
1981	→ Gillingham (loan)	9	(2)
1982	→ Brentford (loan)	3	(1)
1982	Edmonton Drillers	16	(7)
1983	Seattle Sounders	20	(9)
1983–1984	Tulsa Roughnecks (indoor)	17	(6)
1984	Chicago Sting (indoor)	8	(0)
1984	Oklahoma City Stampede	28	(24)
1984	Wimbledon	0	(0)
Total		345	(126)

Managerial career
- 1985: Hagahöjdens BK, Norrköping
- 1990–1992: Plymouth Argyle
- 1992–1993: Slough Town
- 2000–2001: Oxford United
- * Club domestic league appearances and goals

David Michael Kemp (born 20 February 1953) is an English former professional football player and manager. He was assistant manager at Middlesbrough.

== Playing career ==
Kemp began his career with Harrow Borough, subsequently playing for Maidenhead United and Slough Town before joining Crystal Palace in April 1975. He moved to Portsmouth in November 1976 and was their leading goalscorer in both the 1976–77 and 1977–78 seasons, despite not playing a full season for the club. A hugely popular player whilst at the club he even featured in Roy of the Rovers magazine photographed alongside his fictional goalscoring counterpart.

During the time he played for Pompey, a song was sung in his honour, to the tune of Lily The Pink. It is a song that is still sung today (2017). Kemp's reputation as a fans' favourite was further enhanced when he was inducted into the Portsmouth Hall of Fame in April 2016.

He moved to Carlisle United in March 1978, moving to Plymouth Argyle in September 1979 for a then club record fee of £75,000. He had loan spells with Gillingham (December 1981) and Brentford (March 1982), before joining NASL side Edmonton Drillers in June 1982. He spent the 1983 NASL season with Seattle Sounders and also played for San José Earthquakes before leaving the NASL in 1984 for the Oklahoma City Stampede of the short-lived United Soccer League (he accrued the 2nd-highest points total in the league).

== Managerial career ==
Kemp then played for and was assistant manager of, Swedish side Hagahöjdens BK, Norrköping (22 matches, 14 goals). He returned to England in 1986, joining the coaching staff at Wimbledon. He was first team coach when Wimbledon won the FA Cup in 1988. He later took over as manager at Plymouth Argyle in March 1990.

In July 1992, he took over as manager of Conference side Slough Town. He guided Slough to fifth place in the Conference, their highest-ever finish, but left at the end of his first season to become assistant manager at Crystal Palace under new manager Alan Smith where they won the 1993–94 League Championship (and with it promotion to the Premier League), and reached the semi-finals of the League Cup and FA Cup in the 1994–95 season.

He was appointed as assistant manager of Wycombe Wanderers, again under Smith, at the start of the 1995–96 season, leaving along with Smith after a poor start to the 1996–97 season.

He then became assistant manager under John Docherty at Millwall and was later first-team coach at Wimbledon under Joe Kinnear until the summer of 1999 when he returned to Millwall as first-team coach. In December 1999, Kemp was appointed first-team coach at Portsmouth under new manager Tony Pulis.

In October 2000, he was appointed as manager of Oxford United, with Joe Kinnear as Director of Football. Kinnear left to manage Luton Town in February 2001 and Kemp was dismissed two months later following relegation and protests by the Oxford fans. In December 2001, he was appointed as Chief Scout for Leicester City. Later that month he was named as one of the best 101 players to have played for Plymouth Argyle before joining Stoke City as first-team coach in August 2004, again working under Tony Pulis. Kemp left Stoke in June 2005 when Pulis was dismissed.

In September 2005, Pulis took over as manager of Plymouth Argyle and again appointed Kemp as his assistant. Kemp remained in this post under new manager Ian Holloway until August 2006. In October 2006, he rejoined Stoke City as assistant manager, but became chief scout when Peter Reid was appointed as assistant manager. In July 2010, Reid left Stoke to become manager at Plymouth and Pulis again appointed Kemp as his assistant. Kemp remained as assistant to Pulis as Stoke earned automatic promotion to the Premier League in 2008. Stoke established themselves as a Premier League outfit during Kemp's time as assistant and finished as runners-up in the 2011 FA Cup. He left Stoke at the end of the 2012–13 season. He followed Pulis to Crystal Palace in January 2014 and then West Bromwich Albion in January 2015. Kemp left his position as Albion's Assistant Head Coach at the end of the 2016–17 season and retired from football after spending more than 40 years in the game. After a short break Kemp returned to football with Middlesbrough.

== Career statistics ==
Appearances and goals by club, season and competition
Club	Season	League			FA Cup		League Cup		Other (Note: Includes Football League Group Cup.)		Total	
Club	Season	Division	Apps	Goals	Apps	Goals	Apps	Goals	Apps	Goals	Apps	Goals
Crystal Palace	1974–75	Third Division	1	0	0	0	0	0	0	0	1	0
Crystal Palace	1975–76	Third Division	30	9	4	2	3	2	0	0	37	14
Crystal Palace	1976–77	Third Division	4	1	0	0	2	2	0	0	6	2
Crystal Palace	Total		35	10	4	2	5	4	0	0	44	16
Portsmouth	1976–77	Third Division	31	16	2	1	0	0	0	0	33	17
Portsmouth	1977–78	Third Division	33	16	3	2	5	3	0	0	41	21
Portsmouth	Total		64	32	5	3	5	3	0	0	74	38
Carlisle United	1977–78	Third Division	13	4	0	0	0	0	0	0	13	4
Carlisle United	1978–79	Third Division	45	18	3	2	2	1	0	0	50	21
Carlisle United	1979–80	Third Division	3	0	0	0	2	1	0	0	5	1
Carlisle United	Total		61	22	3	2	4	2	0	0	68	26
Plymouth Argyle	1979–80	Third Division	29	15	0	0	0	0	0	0	29	15
Plymouth Argyle	1980–81	Third Division	46	24	3	3	2	1	0	0	51	28
Plymouth Argyle	1981–82	Third Division	9	0	0	0	3	1	3	1	15	2
Plymouth Argyle	Total		84	39	3	3	5	2	3	1	95	45
Gillingham (loan)	1981–82	Third Division	9	2	2	1	0	0	0	0	11	3
Brentford (loan)	1981–82	Third Division	3	1	0	0	0	0	0	0	3	1
Edmonton Drillers	1982	NASL	16	7	–		–		–		16	7
Seattle Sounders	1983	NASL	20	9	–		–		–		20	9
Wimbledon	1984–85	Second Division	0	0	0	0	1	0	0	0	1	0
Career total			292	122	17	11	20	11	3	1	332	145
