= Knezic =

Knezic or Knezić is a surname. Notable people with the surname include:

- Károly Knezić (1808–1849), Hungarian general
- Peter Knezic (born 1959), American soccer player
