= Steve Sharp (soccer) =

American soccer player

Personal information
- Place of birth: Rancho Palos Verdes, California
- Position: Forward

Senior career*
Years	Team	Apps	(Gls)
1985	New York Cosmos (indoor)	0	(0)
1985	Tulsa Tornados		
1985	Los Angeles United		
1985–1987	Tacoma Stars (indoor)	34	(2)
1988	Los Angeles Heat		
1990	Los Angeles Heat		
1990	San Diego Nomads		
1996	Valley Golden Eagles		(1)

International career
1984–1985	United States	8	(1)
- * Club domestic league appearances and goals

Steve Sharp is a former U.S. soccer forward who played in the Major Indoor Soccer League, Western Soccer Alliance and American Professional Soccer League. He also earned eight caps, scoring one goal, with the U.S. national team in 1984 and 1985.

== Professional ==
Sharp grew up in California where attended Rolling Hills High School. In the February 1985, Sharp signed with the New York Cosmos in the Major Indoor Soccer League. The Cosmos folded a month later. He appeared briefly for the Tulsa Tornados of the United Soccer League before moving back to California where he spent the summer with the Los Angeles United, an independent outdoor soccer team. On October 15, 1985, he signed with the Tacoma Stars of the MISL. He then spent one season with the Los Angeles Heat of the Western Soccer Alliance (WSA) in 1988. Two years later, he began the season with the Los Angeles Heat, now playing in the American Professional Soccer League. After seeing little playing time, he requested and gained his release from the team then signed with the San Diego Nomads where he finished the season.

== National team ==
Sharp earned eight caps, scoring one goal, with the U.S. national team in 1984 and 1985. He earned his first cap as a substitute for Chance Fry in an October 9, 1984 win over El Salvador. His one goal with the U.S. came in a 2–2 tie with Ecuador on December 2, 1984. His last appearance with the U.S. came in an April 4, 1985 tie with Canada.
