= Zequinha (footballer, born 1948) =

Brazilian footballer

Personal information
- Full name: José Márcio Pereira da Silva
- Date of birth: 17 November 1948 (age 77)
- Place of birth: Leopoldina, Minas Gerais, Brazil
- Height: 5 ft 8 in (1.73 m)
- Position: Forward

Senior career*
Years	Team	Apps	(Gls)
1967–1969	Flamengo	–	(–)
1970–1974	Botafogo	–	(–)
1975–1977	Grêmio	–	(–)
1978	São Paulo FC	–	(–)
1979	Dallas Tornado	27	(8)
1979–80	Detroit Lightning (indoor)	22	(20)
1980–1981	Dallas Tornado	49	(10)
1980–81	Dallas Tornado (indoor)	15	(12)
1981–83	Tampa Bay Rowdies (indoor)	26	(26)
1982	Tampa Bay Rowdies	24	(4)
1983	Tulsa Roughnecks	16	(2)
1983–84	Tulsa Roughnecks (indoor)	27	(20)
1983–84	Tacoma Stars (indoor)	10	(6)
1984	Dallas Americans	–	(–)
1985	Tulsa Tornados	4	(1)

International career
1971–1973	Brazil	5	(0)
- * Club domestic league appearances and goals

José Márcio Pereira da Silva (born 17 November 1948), better known in the United States as Zequinha is a Brazilian former footballer, who played as a forward in Brazil and the United States.

== Biography ==
Born in Leopoldina, Minas Gerais, Zequinha started his career in 1967 at Flamengo and he left to play for Botafogo two years later. After six season there, he then made the transfer to Grêmio in 1975 and stayed on for three years, before moving to São Paulo FC for one season.

With the popularity of the North American Soccer League at its zenith, Zequinha moved to the U.S. and joined the Dallas Tornado in 1979. Rather than go home during the off-season, he chose to play indoor soccer in the MISL for the Detroit Lightning. He played two more years in Dallas before the team was merged with the Tampa Bay Rowdies after the 1981 season. After two indoor and one outdoor season with the Rowdies he joined the Tulsa Roughnecks and was a member of their Soccer Bowl winning side in 1983. From there he moved back to MISL, playing indoors for the Tacoma Stars. He finished out his career in the USL, first with the Dallas Americans in 1984, then with the Tulsa Tornados in 1985. It was in the indoor game that he had his greatest success while in the U.S. He was a member of Tampa Bay's 1983 indoor Grand Prix winning side, scoring the game-tying goal with 1:55 remaining in regulation to send the match to golden goal overtime.
