= Doumar's Cones and BBQ =

Restaurant in Norfolk, Virginia, U.S.

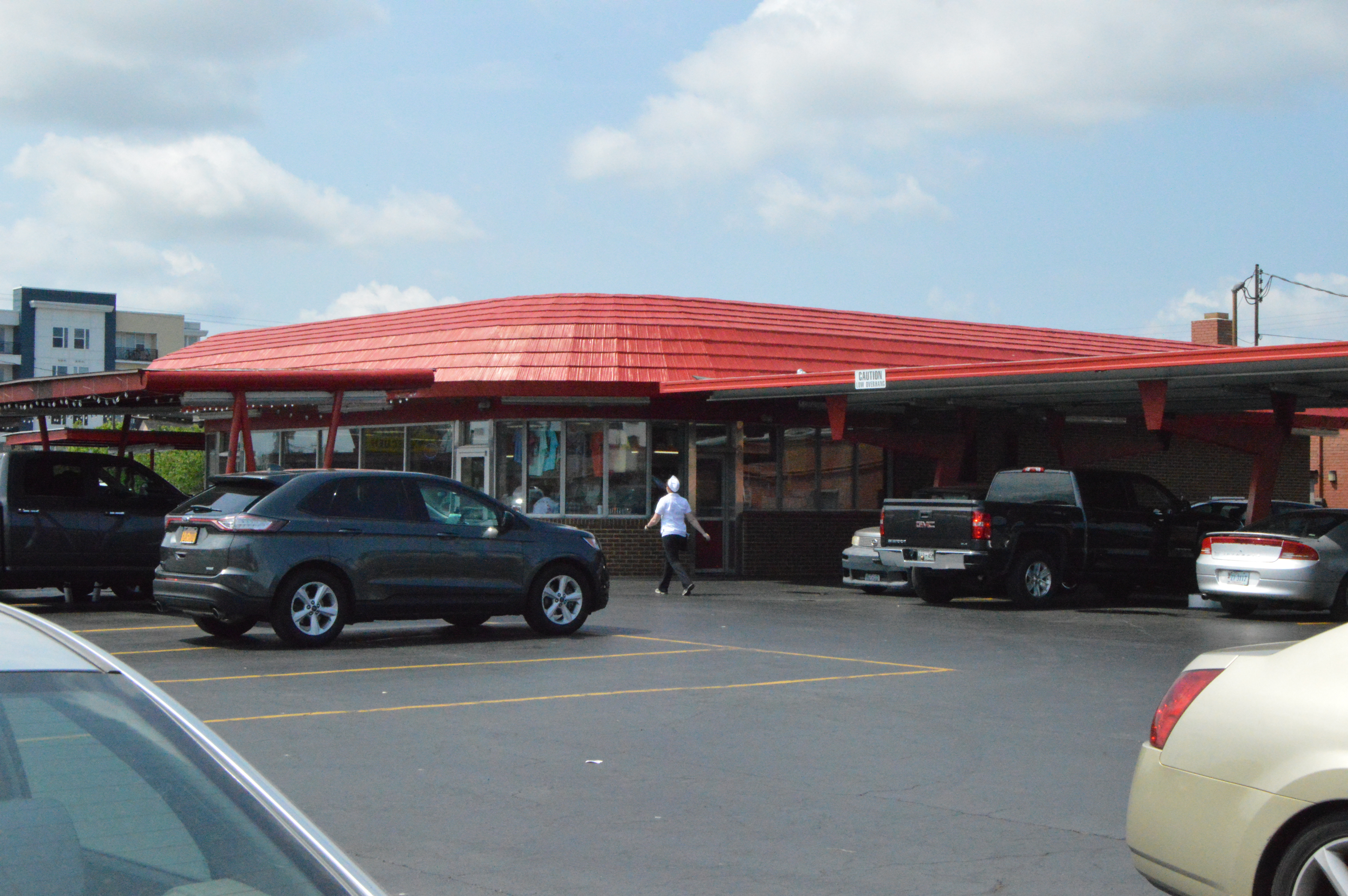
Northeastern view of Doumar's Barbecue

Doumar's Cones and BBQ is a Norfolk, Virginia, restaurant. Historically, the business operated at the Ocean View Amusement Park. At that location Abe Doumar, the business' creator, is credited with creating the world's first ice cream cone.

== Restaurant ==
Doumar is said to have created the first ice cream cone in 1904 at the St. Louis Exposition. In 1913, Doumar opened a vending location on the boardwalk of the Virginia Beach Oceanfront in that popular resort city. Later, he opened another restaurant at Ocean View Amusement Park. After a hurricane destroyed the stands in 1933, Abe's brother George opened the new restaurant at its location on Monticello Avenue in 1934. Doumar's Cones and BBQ is known for its barbecue, ice cream and curb service with carhop waitresses who take orders at customer cars.

Doumar's Cones and BBQ never offered curb service on skates. Although a curb once separated the restaurant and the service parking area, it has since been paved over. Doumar's Cones and BBQ is usually confused with a similar nearby drive-in, called Schoes, which went out of business. Their curb service girls wore skates and hot pants.

== The Doumar Family ==
Abe Doumar was born in Syria in 1881 and moved to the U.S. around 1895. He brought his mother, father and three brothers (Charlie, George, and John) to the United States prior to his death in 1947.

George Doumar, born in 1892, re-built Doumar's and worked at the restaurant until he died in 1974. His son, Albert Doumar, born in 1922 in Norfolk, worked at the restaurant until August 2013, making daily ice cream cones with a cone making machine that dates from 1905. Albert Doumar died after battling bladder cancer on May 14, 2014.

A son of George Doumar, Robert G. Doumar, was a federal judge.

In May 1999, the restaurant was awarded a James Beard Foundation Award in the "America's Classics" category which honors legendary family-owned restaurants around the country. In July 2002, they received the Gourmet Magazine Award for the best ice cream cones in the US. In August 2008, the restaurant was featured on Food Network's hit series Diners, Drive-Ins, and Dives.

In 2011, director Spike Lee used Doumar's for a series of promos for the Ed Schultz show as part of MSNBC's "Lean Forward" campaign. In one episode, Schultz is seen sitting at Doumar's lunch counter when he delivers the line "I need two shows."

== Ice cream cone ==
Legend holds that Abe, at 16, began to sell paperweights and other items while dressed in Arab robes. One night, he bought a waffle from another vendor. Leonidas Kestekidès was a fellow Greek Ottoman who came from Ghent in Belgium with the Fritz waffle machine invented by his cousin Georges Krieger-Zacharidès (Fritz) in 1855 in Brussels. Abe rolled the waffle up and placed a scoop of ice cream on top. He then began selling the cones at the St. Louis Exposition. His cones were such a success that he designed a four-iron baking machine and had a foundry make it for him. At the Jamestown Exposition in 1907, his outlet sold nearly twenty-three thousand cones. After that, Abe bought a semiautomatic 36-iron machine which produced 20 cones per minute.
