= Thompson Usiyan =

Nigerian footballer (1956–2021)

Personal information
- Date of birth: 27 April 1956
- Place of birth: Effurun, Nigeria
- Date of death: 31 August 2021 (aged 65)
- Place of death: La Mesa, California, U.S.
- Height: 6 ft 1 in (1.85 m)
- Position: Forward

College career
Years	Team	Apps	(Gls)
1977–1980	Appalachian State Mountaineers	49	(109)

Senior career*
Years	Team	Apps	(Gls)
1981–1982	Montreal Manic	58	(21)
1981–1982	Montreal Manic (indoor)	16	(13)
1983–1984	Tulsa Roughnecks	11	(1)
1983–1984	Tulsa Roughnecks (indoor)	13	(3)
1984	Oklahoma City Stampede		
1984–1987	Minnesota Strikers (indoor)	87	(66)
1985	Tulsa Tornados		
1987–1988	Los Angeles Lazers (indoor)	66	(63)
1989	Maryland Bays		
1989–1991	St. Louis Storm (indoor)	97	(92)
1991	Hamilton Steelers	7	(2)
1991–1992	San Diego Sockers (indoor)	62	(58)
1992–1993	St. Louis Ambush (indoor)	11	(2)
1993	San Diego Sockers (indoor)	22	(29)
1995	San Jose Grizzlies (indoor)	11	(18)

International career
1976–1981	Nigeria		
- * Club domestic league appearances and goals

Thompson Usiyan (27 April 1956 – 31 August 2021) was a Nigerian professional footballer who played as a forward. He holds the NCAA Division I career scoring record and played in the North American Soccer League, Major Indoor Soccer League, American Soccer League and Continental Indoor Soccer League. He was a member of the Nigerian Olympic soccer team which boycotted the 1976 Olympics. He made several appearances for the Nigeria national team.

== Youth career ==
In 1976, Usiyan was selected as a member of the Nigerian 1976 Olympic team. Although the team travelled to the Olympics, which were held in Montreal, Quebec, Canada, it did not compete as a result of a boycott of the games by African and Arab nations. Usiyan chose to remain in North America and received scholarship offers to attend Clemson University, Howard University and Appalachian State University. He chose Appalachian where he set an NCAA record of 109 career goals. Usiyan also set records for most career points (255), goals in a season (46 in 1980), and points in a season (108 in 1980). He was the Southern Conference Player of the Year in 1977, '78, and '80.

== Club career ==
In 1981, Usiyan signed with the Montreal Manic of the North American Soccer League. The Manic traded Usiyan to the Tulsa Roughnecks following the 1982 season. Leg injuries limited him to eleven games for the Roughnecks in 1983. The team released him on 11 March 1984. On 12 April 1984, he signed with the Oklahoma City Stampede of the United Soccer League. He led the league in scoring and finished third in the points standings. In the fall of 1984, he signed with the Minnesota Strikers of the Major Indoor Soccer League. In 1985, he briefly returned to the outdoor game when he signed with the Tulsa Tornados of the USL, but the league collapsed after only six games. Usiyan had arthroscopic surgery later in the summer, but returned to the Strikers in the fall of 1985 and spent the next two seasons in Minnesota. On 26 March 1987, the Strikers traded Usiyan to the Los Angeles Lazers in exchange for Greg Ion after Usiyan had a locker room fight with Strikers goalkeeper Tino Lettieri. Usiyan remained with the Lazers through the 1987–88 season. He did not play again until signed by the Maryland Bays of the American Soccer League in June 1989. During his time away from soccer, he finished his business degree at Appalachian State. On 9 August 1989, he returned to MISL when he signed with the St. Louis Storm. During his two seasons in St. Louis, Usiyan began working as a tax consultant. After finishing his degree, he had spent some time as an accountant and after his retirement, he became a full-time tax consultant. During the summer of 1991, Usiyan played for the Hamilton Steelers in the Canadian Soccer League. On 9 September 1991, the Storm traded Usiyan to the San Diego Sockers in exchange for Branko Segota and the Sockers 1992 first round draft choice. Usiyan won the 1992 MISL championship with the Sockers. On 20 November 1992, Usiyan signed with the St. Louis Ambush of the National Professional Soccer League. On 1 June 1993, the Arizona Sandsharks drafted Usiyan in the first round of the 1993 Continental Indoor Soccer League supplemental draft. Two days later, the San Diego Sockers traded Wes Wade to the Sandsharks in exchange for Usiyan, Alex Golovnia and Nassim Olabi. On 10 September 1993, the league suspended Usiyan indefinitely for accumulated red cards. On 21 June 1995, the San Jose Grizzlies of the CISL drafted Usiyan after he was cleared by the league to play. He retired permanently at the end of the season.

Usiyan was the MISL's sixteenth leading scorer in 1984–85 as a member of the Minnesota Strikers, with 62 points in 47 games. He was fifteenth best a season later with 60 points in 40 contests. Usiyan finished eighth in scoring in the 1987–88 season as a member of the Los Angeles Lazers with 88 points in 51 games. He was sixth best in 1990–91 with 102 points in 51 games played for the St. Louis Storm. Usiyan was amongst the leaders one final time (in the league's last season) finishing fifteenth with 57 points in 40 games playing with the San Diego Sockers. He was named Championship Series Most Valuable Player as the Sockers won the championship.

== International career ==
Usiyan made several appearances for Nigeria, including a 2–0 1982 FIFA World Cup qualifying loss to Algeria on 10 October 1981 in Lagos. He scored on his debut, a friendly match against Kenya in 1976. Usiyan also played for Nigeria at the 1976 African Cup of Nations finals in Ethiopia. He won a silver medal with the Nigerian squad at the 1978 All-Africa Games in Algiers.

Usiyan made his home in San Diego where he was a tax consultant.
