= Estadio Olímpico Benito Juárez =

Stadium in Ciudad Juarez, Chihuahua, Mexico

- Interactive map of Estadio Olímpico Benito Juárez
- Location: Ciudad Juárez, Chihuahua, Mexico
- Coordinates: 31°45′11″N 106°28′4″W
- Owner: Universidad Autónoma de Ciudad Juárez
- Operator: FC Juárez
- Capacity: 19,703
- Surface: Grass

Construction
- Groundbreaking: 2 October 1980
- Opened: 12 May 1981

Tenants
- El Paso/Juarez Gamecocks (1985); Indios de Ciudad Juarez (2005–2011); Indios de la UACJ (2012–2016); FC Juárez (2015–present)

Estadio Olímpico Benito Juárez (Benito Juárez Olympic Stadium) is a multi-purpose stadium in Ciudad Juárez, Chihuahua, Mexico. It is the home stadium of Liga MX football club FC Juárez. The stadium was completed in 1980 and had its first sports match the following year. It has a capacity of 19,703, making it the stadium with the lowest seating capacity in Liga MX.

== History ==
The proposal for the construction of the stadium dates back to 1978, when a group of sport journalists from Ciudad Juárez urged Mexican President José López Portillo to build an Olympic stadium during an official visit he had in the city. The journalists were Armando Muro, Sergio "Yonékura" Montenegro, Miguel Moreno, Salvador Juvenal Esparza, "El Cuervo" Galván, Juvenal Aragón, Manuel del Castillo, and a man with the surname Rocha.

After months of public interest, the construction of a new stadium was approved and the costs were divided between the Chihuahua state government and the federal government. The stadium was publicly inaugurated on 2 October 1980 during a ceremony presided by López Portillo in another visit to the city. Its first sport event was held on 12 May 1981 with a scoreless draw between the Mexico national football team and Spanish football club Atlético Madrid. Although the match ended without goals, it featured several offensive attempts, with both goalkeepers playing a key role in preserving the draw. At the time, Ciudad Juárez did not have a professional football team, and the match marked the first occasion that the Mexico national team played in the city. The game drew 23,000 spectators.

In 1986, the Mexican government transferred ownership of the stadium to the Universidad Autónoma de Ciudad Juárez (UACJ). The university currently rents the stadium to FC Juárez for use as the club's home venue. FC Juárez has played at the stadium since 2015. In February 2016, Pope Francis celebrated mass near the stadium before visiting it, where a large crowd awaited him. Large screens were set up inside the stadium so attendees could follow the ceremony.

Since FC Juárez's promotion to Liga MX, Mexico's top-division football league, for the Apertura 2019 tournament, the stadium's ground conditions have improved due to regular maintenance. At the end of that calendar year, the team installed a new LED lighting system at the stadium at a cost of approximately US$400,000, allowing FC Juárez to meet the lighting standards of the Mexican Football Federation.

In July 2024, FC Juárez played a friendly match against German Bundesliga club Eintracht Frankfurt at the stadium. The match attracted local attention, as it marked the first time since the 1981 inauguration match that a European team had played at the venue. FC Juárez lost the match 1–2.

== Facilities ==
The stadium was built on a 38,000 m^{2} (410,000 sq ft) area. It has served as the home stadium of Liga MX football club FC Juárez. The venue is multi-purpose, featuring an association football pitch and an Olympic athletics track. The stadium is used for sporting events as well as activities and events organized by UACJ and the Ciudad Juárez community. It is located on the grounds of Chamizal Public Federal Park, a city park connecting Ciudad Juárez and El Paso, Texas, US, adjacent to Chamizal National Memorial in El Paso. This land was once a disputed boundary area between the US and Mexico. The stadium is approximately 2.5 km (1.6 mi) from the US border. Owned by UACJ, it serves as an official sports facility of the university and is considered part of its campus.

The playing surface is grass and undergoes two seasonal treatments per year, in summer and winter, in response to the weather conditions in Ciudad Juárez. The field is 105 m (344 ft) long and 68 m (223 ft) wide. There are two gyms inside the stadium's buildings for weight training and gymnastics. Adjacent to the stadium is a training complex known as the Collegiate Sports Unit (Unidad Deportiva Universitaria), which opened to the public in 2017. The complex includes facilities for football, futsal, track and field, volleyball, and tennis. The stadium's parking lot has capacity for 1,500 vehicles.

=== Capacity ===
Reported seating capacity figures for the stadium vary by source, ranging from 19,703 to 22,800. While UACJ lists the capacity as 22,800, several media outlets report a reduced capacity of 19,703 following seating modifications that converted unassigned seating areas into seats.

This discrepancy drew attention in 2019, when FC Juárez was promoted to Liga MX, which requires stadiums to have a minimum seating capacity of 20,000. At the time of promotion, the stadium reportedly met the requirement with a capacity of 22,800; however, subsequent modifications reportedly reduced the seating total to 19,703. Liga MX officials did not take action against FC Juárez, stating that the stadium met capacity requirements at the time of the club's admission to the league, despite later modifications affecting seating totals.

Since 2019, the stadium has had the lowest seating capacity among all stadiums used by Liga MX teams.
