= Tulsa Tornado's =

American professional soccer team

Tulsa Tornados (Logo)

The Tulsa Tornado's were a professional outdoor soccer team from Tulsa, Oklahoma. They played in the 2nd division United Soccer League during the partially completed 1985 season.

The team was created when the owner of the Oklahoma City Stampede, David Fraser, announced that he was moving the franchise to Tulsa and changing their name in December 1984. Their new name (containing an incorrect apostrophe) referred to city's location in Tornado Alley. The previous September, the North American Soccer League's Tulsa Roughnecks had announced that they were folding, and Fraser may have been hoping to take advantage of a fairly well-established fanbase that had enjoyed a championship run just one year prior. Before the team could begin playing in Tulsa, though, the situation for the team and the league changed drastically. All of the franchises in the one-year-old USL had lost money in 1984, and most of them failed to post a performance bond to guarantee their return for 1985. In February a last-ditch set of USL/NASL merger discussions that hoped to bring a financial boost to the USL and a boost in membership to the flagging NASL ended without an agreement. In short order the NASL announced that there would be no 1985 season, and six of the nine USL teams either ended operations or withdrew from the league. Only the Dallas Americans, South Florida Sun, and the expansion El Paso/Juarez Gamecocks, joined Tulsa to attempt the upcoming season. Further compounding the challenges of attracting fans and sponsors in a new town on short notice, the Roughnecks' former general manager, Noel Lemon, announced in January that he had been authorized to use the Roughnecks name for a new squad that he was assembling for the 1985 NASL campaign. When the NASL cancelled the season, the Roughnecks put together a 20-game exhibition slate that was to start in the same month as the Tornado's games, leaving the relatively small city of Tulsa with two hastily assembled and underfunded clubs competing for the attention of the town's soccer fans.

The USL re-arranged its schedule to open with a round-robin tournament for the "USL Cup" (each team was to play the others twice) to be followed by a twelve-game regular season. Play began on May 19, and the Tornado's organization started to collapse almost immediately. Tulsa's soccer fans overwhelmingly favored the rebooted Roughnecks, who brought back many of the players that had suited up for the previous iteration of the club, and the Tornado's only attracted around 500 spectators per game to the three USL cup matches they hosted. Reports soon emerged that the owners were failing to make payroll for the coaches and players and that they were also facing lawsuits related to missed rent payments to the University of Tulsa for the use of Skelly Stadium. The unpaid team refused to take the field for a June 6 home exhibition game or travel to Dallas for a June 8 USL Cup game. Around this time, coach Brian Harvey resigned and several players began to take their leave. New investors led by former University of Oklahoma and professional football player Jimbo Elrod and country singer Sammie Jo Cole engaged in negotiations to take over principal ownership of the Tornado's and offer some support to the rest of the league as well, and the club did travel to Fort Lauderdale (albeit with a "substantially different" roster) to compete in the final game of the Cup round on June 15. However, the 1-0 loss would be their final match. The regular season opener scheduled for June 22 was cancelled due to still unresolved payroll and stadium rent issues, and a few days later creditors foreclosed on the USL and locked officials out of their offices. The season was suspended on June 25. Elrod and Cole backed off of their investment plan, which likely would have moved the Tornado's back to Oklahoma City to end the cross-town competition between the two Tulsa clubs and possibly make room for the Roughnecks in the USL, when the league suspended operations.

== 1985 League Cup standings ==
| Place | 1985 League Cup | GP | W | T | L | GF | GA | % | Avg. Att. |
|---|---|---|---|---|---|---|---|---|---|
| 1 | South Florida Sun | 6 | 4 | 0 | 2 | 9 | 8 | .667 | 2,195 |
| 2 | Dallas Americans | 6 | 3 | 0 | 3 | 12 | 9 | .500 | 2,400 |
| 3 | Tulsa Tornado's | 6 | 3 | 0 | 3 | 7 | 7 | .500 | 500 |
| 4 | El Paso/Juarez Gamecocks | 6 | 2 | 0 | 4 | 10 | 15 | .333 | 1,430 |

=== Team scoring leader ===
| USL Rank | Scorer | GP | Goals | Assists | Points |
|---|---|---|---|---|---|
| 6 | Zequinha | 4 | 1 | 2 | 3 |

=== Team goalkeeping stats ===
| USL Rank | Player | GP | W–L | Min | SH | SV | SO | GA | GAA |
|---|---|---|---|---|---|---|---|---|---|
| 1 | Delroy Allen | 5 | 3–2 | 434 | 60 | 17 | 0 | 6 | 1.24 |

== 1985 Roster ==
- (Jamaica) Delroy Allen; 5 Apps 0 Goals
- (Argentina) Ricardo Alonso
- (South Africa) Mike Connell
- (United States) John Dolinsky
- (Sweden) Däniel Johansson; 6 Apps 3 Goals
- (United States) Peter Knezic
- (United States) Art Kramer
- (United States) Jim Millinder
- (England) Neil Ridgeway
- (United States) Bill Sautter
- (United States) Steve Sharp
- (England) Don Tobin
- (United States) Tim Tyma
- (Nigeria) Thompson Usiyan
- (United States) Scott Westbrook
- (Brazil) Zequinha; 4 Apps 1 Goal
