= Arenda Wright Allen =

American judge (born 1960)

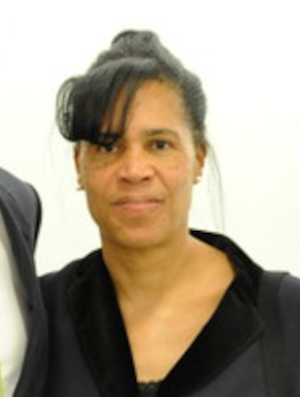

Senior Judge of the United States District Court for the Eastern District of Virginia
- Incumbent
- Assumed office May 13, 2026

Judge of the United States District Court for the Eastern District of Virginia
- In office May 12, 2011 – May 13, 2026
- Appointed by: Barack Obama
- Preceded by: Jerome B. Friedman
- Succeeded by: vacant

Personal details
- Born: Arenda Lauretta Wright; December 9, 1960 (age 65) Philadelphia, Pennsylvania, U.S.
- Education: Kutztown University of Pennsylvania (BA); North Carolina Central University (JD)

Military service
- Allegiance: United States
- Branch/service: United States Navy
- Years of service: 1985–2005
- Rank: Commander
- Unit: Navy Judge Advocate General's Corps

Arenda Lauretta Wright Allen (born December 9, 1960) is a senior United States district judge of the United States District Court for the Eastern District of Virginia. She formerly worked as an assistant United States attorney and a federal public defender in Norfolk, Virginia.

== Early life and education ==
Born in Philadelphia, Wright Allen graduated from Kutztown University of Pennsylvania (then called Kutztown State College) with her Bachelor of Arts degree in 1982 and later from North Carolina Central University School of Law with a Juris Doctor in 1985. In May 2013, Wright Allen was awarded an honorary doctorate from Kutztown University of Pennsylvania.

== Career ==
Wright Allen started her legal career as a Judge Advocate General's Corps officer in the United States Navy as an active duty officer between 1985 and 1990 and in the United States Navy Reserve between 1992 and 2005. She was an Assistant United States Attorney in the Eastern District of Virginia from 2001 to 2005. Wright Allen joined the Federal Public Defender's Office for the Eastern District of Virginia in 2005, where she had served as a Supervisory Assistant Federal Public Defender until becoming a federal judge in 2011.

=== Federal judicial service ===
On the recommendation of U.S. Senators Jim Webb and Mark R. Warner, Wright Allen was nominated to the United States District Court for the Eastern District of Virginia by President Barack Obama on December 1, 2010, to a seat vacated Jerome B. Friedman, who assumed senior status on November 30, 2010. The United States Senate confirmed Wright Allen on May 11, 2011, by a 96–0 vote. She received her judicial commission the following day. She assumed senior status on May 13, 2026.

=== Overturning Virginia's same-sex marriage ban ===
On February 13, 2014, Allen overturned Virginia's statutory same-sex marriage ban, finding the ban unconstitutional. In her ruling, Allen inadvertently attributed the principle that "all men are created equal" to the U.S. Constitution, rather than the Declaration of Independence – an error which she corrected in a subsequent amended ruling.

== Personal life ==
Allen is married to Delroy Allen, a retired Jamaican-American soccer player.

== See also ==
- List of African-American federal judges
- List of African-American jurists

Legal offices
Preceded by Jerome B. Friedman	Judge of the United States District Court for the Eastern District of Virginia; 2011–2026	Vacant
