= Jeff Bourne (footballer) =

English footballer

Personal information
- Full name: Jeffrey Albert Bourne
- Date of birth: 19 June 1948
- Place of birth: Linton, Derbyshire, England
- Date of death: 31 July 2014 (aged 66)
- Height: 5 ft 10 in (1.78 m)
- Position: Striker

Senior career*
Years	Team	Apps	(Gls)
–1971	Burton Albion		
1971–1977	Derby County	73	(14)
1976	→ Dallas Tornado (loan)	22	(15)
1977–1978	Crystal Palace	32	(10)
1978	Dallas Tornado	30	(21)
1979	Atlanta Chiefs	29	(18)
1979–1980	Sheffield United	26	(11)
1980	Atlanta Chiefs	19	(5)
1980–1981	Seattle Sounders	32	(8)
1980–1981	Seattle Sounders (indoor)	17	(21)
1981–1984	Wichita Wings (indoor)	113	(109)
1982	→ Oklahoma City Slickers (loan)		(20)
1983	→ Dallas Americans (loan)		(17)
- * Club domestic league appearances and goals

Jeffrey Albert Bourne (19 June 1948 – 31 July 2014) was an English footballer who played as a striker. Born in Linton, Derbyshire, he spent most of his early career in the lower English divisions before moving to the United States, where he played six seasons in the North American Soccer League, two in the second division American Soccer League. He led the ASL in scoring in 1983.

== England ==
Bourne began his career with non-league club Burton Albion before signing with Derby County in February 1971. He saw limited time with the first team, playing mostly with the reserves until January 1974. He finished the 1973–1974 season with nine goals as Derby County finished third in the standings. He found himself back with the reserves the next season, with occasional stretches of first team. In 1975, he was part of the team that won the First Division, contributing 17 appearances and 2 goals. In 1976, Derby County loaned Bourne to the Dallas Tornado of the North American Soccer League (NASL). When it became apparent that Bourne would never be more than a sporadic player with the club, Derby County sold his contract to Crystal Palace F.C. for £30,000 in March 1977. At the time that Bourne joined Crystal Palace the team was in a free fall. They had slipped from the top division to the third in two seasons and appeared in danger of falling further. Crystal Palace had just sold Paul Hammond to the Tampa Bay Rowdies of the NASL. They then used the cash to purchase Bourne. Bourne made an immediate impact, scoring nine goals in fifteen games and helping Crystal Palace return to the Second Division. Despite his contribution, Bourne was considered a poor long-term investment and he was sent to the Dallas Tornado in the spring of 1978.

== United States ==
Bourne first played in the United States when he came to the Dallas Tornado of the North American Soccer League on loan from Derby County in 1976. He scored fifteen goals in twenty-two games earning second-team All Star honors. In 1978, Dallas purchased his contract from Crystal Palace. In 1979, the Tornado traded Bourne to the Atlanta Chiefs for the first round in the 1979 College Draft. Bourne scored eighteen goals in twenty-nine games for the Chiefs in 1979, but his production dropped to five goals in twenty games in 1980. As a result, the Chiefs sent Bourne to the Seattle Sounders where he finished the season with two goals in eight games. That winter, Bourne was one of the top players during the NASL indoor season, scoring twenty-one goals in seventeen games. Bourne played the 1981 season, his last in the NASL, with Seattle. In the fall of 1981, he signed with the Wichita Wings of the Major Indoor Soccer League. In the 1981–1982 season, he twenty goals. In 1982, he signed on loan from the Wings to the Oklahoma City Slickers of the American Soccer League. The Slickers went to the championship series where it fell to the Detroit Express. Bourne then returned to the Wings for the 1982-1983 indoor season. The Slickers attempted to acquire him for the 1983 ASL season, but the Wings asking price was too high and Bourne signed with the Dallas Americans. He led the league in scoring with seventeen goals. He returned to the Wings and was the league's second-leading scorer when he suffered a season-ending injury in April 1984. There are also indications that he may have played in the United Soccer League in 1984.

== Death ==
Bourne died on 31 July 2014 from motor neurone disease, having only been diagnosed with the disease nine weeks previously.
