= Robert G. Doumar =

American judge (1930–2023)

Senior Judge of the United States District Court for the Eastern District of Virginia
- In office April 30, 1996 – November 4, 2023

Judge of the United States District Court for the Eastern District of Virginia
- In office December 3, 1981 – April 30, 1996
- Appointed by: Ronald Reagan
- Preceded by: Richard Boykin Kellam
- Succeeded by: Jerome B. Friedman

Personal details
- Born: Robert George Doumar; February 17, 1930 Norfolk, Virginia, U.S.
- Died: November 4, 2023 (aged 93) Norfolk, Virginia, U.S.
- Party: Republican
- Education: University of Virginia (BA, LLB, LLM)

Robert George Doumar (February 17, 1930 – November 4, 2023) was a United States district judge of the United States District Court for the Eastern District of Virginia.

== Early life, education, and career ==
Doumar's father, George Doumar (Arabic: جورج دومار), was from Syria and immigrated to America in 1901. His mother Margot (Arabic: مارغوت دومار) came from what is now Lebanon later in an arranged marriage. Both were Arabic-speaking Christians and both became U.S. citizens. The family-owned eatery, Doumar's, in Norfolk, Virginia still exists there, and features curb service, homemade barbecue, and handmade ice cream cones. The Doumar family credits Doumar's uncle, Abe Doumar, with inventing the ice cream cone, although Abe's nephew Albert conceded, "There were 40 ice cream stands in the World's Fair and all of them claim they invented the ice cream cone."

Born in Norfolk, Doumar received a Bachelor of Arts degree from the University of Virginia in 1951 and a Bachelor of Laws from the University of Virginia School of Law in 1953. He was in the United States Army from 1953 to 1955 as a lawyer, and was in private practice in Norfolk from 1955 to 1981. Doumar was Norfolk city chairman of the Republican Party during 1957–63 and 1966–74. Doumar ran, unsuccessfully, as a Republican for the Virginia House of Delegates in 1959 and 1961. He also lost a state Senate bid in 1967. According to Doumar, he played a major role in every Republican campaign in Norfolk since 1957. Doumar co-managed Richard Nixon's Norfolk campaigns in 1968 and 1972 and was a delegate to the Republican National Convention in 1968, 1972, and 1976. He had been a Republican State Central Committee member 10 years when he was nominated as a federal judge.

Doumar was married to the former Dorothy Mundy, who served as the Rector of Old Dominion University in Norfolk. He has two children and six grandchildren. During the Trump administration, his nephew, attorney George R.A. Doumar, applied unsuccessfully to a federal district judgeship in the Eastern District of Virginia. Doumar died on November 4, 2023, at the age of 93.

== Federal judicial service ==
As a delegate to three Republican national conventions, Doumar met California Governor Ronald Reagan, with whom he shared a skepticism about government and an admiration for individual rights. After Reagan won the White House, Senator John Warner, a law school classmate, sponsored Doumar for the bench. On November 5, 1981, President Reagan nominated Doumar to a seat on the United States District Court for the Eastern District of Virginia vacated by Judge Richard Boykin Kellam. Doumar was confirmed by the United States Senate on December 3, 1981, and received his commission the same day. He received a Master of Laws from the University of Virginia School of Law in 1988, and assumed senior status on April 30, 1996.

== Comments ==
An August 17, 1991 article entitled "Judge Inflames Aids Case" states: "U.S. District Judge Robert G. Doumar said that people infected with the AIDS virus 'should be shot' if they have unprotected sex." In 2017, Doumar stated from the bench that child porn producers should be "shot." In an interview with The Virginian-Pilot, he confirmed "I said it. I said that they should be shot."

== Notable cases ==
Doumar presided over the case of Yaser Esam Hamdi in the cases of Hamdi v. Rumsfeld and Jeffrey Spruill v. U.S., 243 F. Supp. 2d 527, 2002 U.S. Dist. LEXIS 25492 (E.D. Va., 2002). Doumar ruled that a U.S. citizen designated as an enemy combatant was entitled to a lawyer, and that the government had to provide evidence justifying his detention. The Fourth Circuit reversed Doumar, but the Supreme Court reversed the Fourth Circuit and upheld Doumar's basic rulings, 8-1, with multiple opinions. 542 U.S. 507 (2004). He also presided over the case against the Government of Sudan arising out of the bombing of the U.S.S. Cole in Yemen.

In the case of U.S. v. Martinovich, the defendant appealed alleging "a litany of errors." On January 7, 2016, in vacating Doumar's sentence as "procedurally unreasonable," the Fourth Circuit stated: "Here, we are once again[fn 6] confronted with a case replete with the district court’s ill-advised comments and interference." Footnote 6: "See, e.g., United States v. Cherry, 720 F.3d 161, 167-69 (4th Cir. 2013); United States v. Ecklin, 528 F. App’x 357, 363(4th Cir. 2013); United States v. Garries, 452 F. App’x 304, 309-11 (4th Cir. 2011) (per curiam); Murphy v. United States, 383 F. App’x 326, 334 (4th Cir. 2010) (per curiam); United States v. Dabney, 71 F. App’x 207, 210 (4th Cir. 2003) (per curiam)."

According to press reports, during the hearing "[o]ne appeals court judge expressed incredulity at Doumar's misstatement of federal sentencing rules during Martinovich's sentencing hearing" and "[a]nother said the judge's frequent interruptions of Martinovich's defense reminded him of another case two years ago." "We admonished him," 4th Circuit Judge James A. Wynn Jr. said. "Tried to be as kind as we could. … Looks like the same case." "Circuit Judge Stephanie D. Thacker was unable to complete a sentence at one point as she considered this 'misstatement of the law.' 'I just — I mean — how do you — it couldn't be more clear,' Thacker told an assistant U.S. attorney."

The ABA Journal reported on the Fourth Circuit's opinion in Martinovich in a 13 January 2016 article: "Federal judge crossed the line with imprudent comments and trial interruptions, 4th Circuit says."

On April 19, 2016, the Fourth Circuit also reversed Doumar's dismissal in G. G. v. Gloucester County School Board as to a transgender boy's Title IX claim. Doumar's opinion stated as to Title IX: "the Department of Education's interpretation [of Section 106.33] should not be given controlling weight". Doumar's opinion as to a motion for a preliminary injunction stated: "The School Board contends that granting the preliminary injunction and allowing G.G. to use the male restroom would endanger the safety and privacy of other students" and "G.G.'s unsupported claims, which are mostly inadmissible hearsay, fail to show that his presence in the male restroom would not infringe upon the privacy of other students". The Fourth Circuit rejected both of these assertions, concluding that "the record is devoid of any evidence tending to show that G.G.’s use of the boys’ restroom creates a safety issue," and that Doumar "abused [his] discretion when [he] denied G.G.’s request for a preliminary injunction without considering G.G.’s proffered evidence." At the district court hearing on the motion to dismiss, Judge Doumar had stated that he had “no problem with transgender” but had “a lot of problems with sex." "I am worried about where we are going," Doumar declared. "Maybe I am just old-fashioned. . . . Where the U.S is going scares me. It really scares me." The Supreme Court subsequently denied the school board's petition for a writ of certiorari, upholding the Fourth Circuit.

In 2016, Doumar recused himself from a 'highly contentious' lawsuit over mold contamination in housing for military families, saying that both sides had questioned his impartiality and citing a litany of heated conflicts between himself and the attorneys.

== Sources ==
Legal offices
Preceded by Richard Boykin Kellam	Judge of the United States District Court for the Eastern District of Virginia; 1981–1996	Succeeded by Jerome B. Friedman
