= Delroy Allen =

Jamaican-American footballer (born 1958)

Personal information
- Date of birth: 6 October 1958 (age 68)
- Place of birth: Montego Bay, Jamaica
- Height: 6 ft 2 in (1.88 m)
- Position: Goalkeeper

Youth career
- 1971–1974: Santos Boys Club, Henry Compton Secondary School, and Henry Compton Old Boys.

Senior career*
Years	Team	Apps	(Gls)
1980–1981	Tulsa Roughnecks (indoor)	9	(0)
1981	Tulsa Roughnecks	4	(0)
1983	Oklahoma City Slickers		
1984	Oklahoma City Stampede	22	(0)
1985	Tulsa Tornados	5	(0)
- * Club domestic league appearances and goals

Delroy Allen (born 6 October 1958) is a retired Jamaican-American soccer goalkeeper who played professionally in the North American Soccer League, American Soccer League and United Soccer League.

== Early life ==
Allen attended boys elementary school in Montego Bay. He then moved to London, England in 1967. Allen attended Langford Elementary School and Henry Compton Secondary Boys School, Brown Jones House Fulham, London, England.

Allen moved to the United States in 1974 and attended Midwood High School in Brooklyn, New York, where graduated in 1976. He attended college at Fulton–Montgomery Community College, Jacksonville University and received his Bachelor of Science, cum laude, from Old Dominion University.

== Soccer career ==
Allen played professionally as a soccer goalkeeper in the North American Soccer League, American Soccer League and United Soccer League.

He also played for the JU Dolphins men's soccer team in 1978 and 1979 and holds the school record for lowest career goals against average. He was selected to the East team of the NCSAA Senior Bowl In 1980, the Tulsa Roughnecks of the North American Soccer League came to Jacksonville to play a pre-season game with the Washington Diplomats. Allen went to watch the Roughnecks practice and noticed that they had only one goalkeeper. He offered to play in the Roughnecks' scrimmage. Tulsa head coach Charlie Mitchell offered Allen a contract contingent on him gaining his U.S. citizenship. Allen did so in August 1980 and signed immediately after with the Roughnecks. He joined the Roughnecks in time for the 1980–1981 NASL indoor season, then played the 1981 outdoor season. In 1983, he played for the Oklahoma City Slickers of the American Soccer League. In 1984, he played for the Oklahoma City Stampede of the United Soccer League. In 1985, he moved to the Tulsa Tornados of the USL. However, the league folded after six games.

== Personal life ==
Allen is married to Arenda Wright Allen, a United States district judge.
