= Peter Knezic =

American soccer player (born 1959)

Peter A. Knezic
Personal information
- Date of birth: June 26, 1959 (age 67)
- Place of birth: Cudahy, Wisconsin, U.S.
- Height: 5 ft 11 in (1.80 m)
- Positions: Midfielder; defender

Youth career
- 1967–?: Milwaukee Serbians

College career
Years	Team	Apps	(Gls)
1977–1980	Milwaukee Panthers		

Senior career*
Years	Team	Apps	(Gls)
1980–1981	Chicago Horizons (indoor)	0	(0)
1982–1983	Oklahoma City Slickers		
1984	Oklahoma City Stampede		
1984–1985	Chicago Sting (indoor)	3	(0)
1985	Tulsa Tornados		
1985–1990	Milwaukee Wave (indoor)	191	(81)

Managerial career
- 1986–: Milwaukee Wave (assistant)
- 1989–1990: UW–Milwaukee Panthers
- * Club domestic league appearances and goals

Peter Knezic (born June 26, 1959) is an American retired soccer player who played professionally in the Major Indoor Soccer League, American Soccer League, United Soccer League and American Indoor Soccer League. He coached at the professional, collegiate and youth soccer level where he is currently the coaching director at Milwaukee Kickers Soccer Club.

== Youth ==
Knezic grew up in Cudahy, Wisconsin where in 1967 he began playing youth soccer with the Milwaukee Serbians. He moved up the club ranks and eventually played for their senior team where he was part of three Wisconsin Major Division and two Wisconsin Challenge Cup championships. He attended the University of Wisconsin–Milwaukee where he was a 1979 Honorable Mention (third team) All American soccer player.

== Professional ==
In 1980, both the Chicago Sting of the North American Soccer League and the Chicago Horizons of the Major Indoor Soccer League drafted Knezic. He signed with the Horizons and played one season with them before the team folded. In 1982, he signed with the Oklahoma City Slickers of the American Soccer League. He remained with the Slickers through the 1983 season. When both the team and the league collapsed, he moved to the Oklahoma City Stampede of the newly established United Soccer League. In 1985, he moved to the Tulsa Tornados, but the team and league collapsed six games into the season. In the fall of 1985, he signed with the Milwaukee Wave of the American Indoor Soccer Association. He was selected for the All Star game that season. Knezic suffered from back problems during the 1986–1987 season and when not playing, served as the team's assistant coach and general manager for player personnel. He continued to play for the Wave through the 1989–1990 season. In March 1992, the Wave retired his playing number - #5. In 1989, Knezic was hired to coach the UW–Milwaukee Panthers women's soccer team. Over two seasons, he compiled a 17-17-4 record and resigned on March 13, 1991. He was inducted into the Wisconsin Soccer Hall of Fame in 2007.
