= Hassan Nazari =

Iranian footballer

Personal information
- Full name: Hassan Nazari
- Date of birth: August 19, 1956 (age 70)
- Place of birth: Abadan, Iran
- Height: 1.70 m (5 ft 7 in)
- Position: Defender

Senior career*
Years	Team	Apps	(Gls)
1972–1974	Sepah Abadan F.C.		
1974–1975	Sanat Naft Abadan F.C.		
1975–1978	Taj		
1978–1982	Al-Ahli		
1985	Dallas Americans	5	(3)
1989	Richardson Rockets		

International career
1975–1978	Iran	34	(1)
- * Club domestic league appearances and goals

Hassan Nazari (Persian: حسن نظری, born August 19, 1956, in Abadan, Iran) is a retired Iranian footballer. He usually played as a defender.

== Playing career ==
Nazari began his career in his hometown of Abadan, playing for clubs like Sepah Abadan and Sanat Naft. His good play got him a transfer to one of Iranian football's better teams, Taj. There he could win the Hazfi Cup in 1977.

By the time he was 19 he got his first call up to the national team. He was a starter at the 1976 Asian Cup in Tehran, which Iran won. He also participated in the football tournament at the 1976 Olympics where Iran progressed to the quarter-finals.

He played his last meaningful games for the national team at World Cup 1978 in Argentina. He finished his international career with 35 caps and 1 goal.

After the revolution in Iran, he settled for UAE and in particular Al-Ahli club of Dubai. Jointly with his national teammate, Hassan Roshan, they won the championship for Al Ahli in 1980.

He then moved to Qatar and played his last season of professional football. In 1985, he played for the Dallas Americans in the United Soccer League. In 1989, he played for the Richardson Rockets in the Southwest Independent Soccer League.

== After retirement ==
After retiring, he moved to the United States where he was able to obtain his "A" coaching license. He also was involved with the Dallas Tornado. After a short time there he created the Dallas Texans Soccer Club, which is a very successful youth team. During this time he also married an American woman. He now lives with his wife and children in Dallas, Texas, and is the coaching director for the Dallas Texans Soccer Club, where he also coaches teams still. The club is often regarded as one of the best in the nation, often ranking #1. Several of the teams he has coached have gone on to win National Championships, the 87, 88, and 92 boys. Notable alumni Nazari has coached include Clint Dempsey, Omar Gonzalez, Nick Garcia and Lee Nguyen.
