= El Paso/Juarez Gamecocks =

Mexican football club

- Full name: El Paso/Juarez Gamecocks
- Nickname: Los Gallos
- Founded: 1985
- Dissolved: June 1985; 41 years ago
- Stadium: Estadio Olímpico Benito Juárez
- Capacity: 22,000
- League: United Soccer League (1985)
- 1985: fourth

The El Paso/Juarez Gamecocks were a professional soccer team that played one season in the United Soccer League. They played 6 games in the USL's 1985 League Cup before folding. The entire league collapsed after only one regular season game had been played. For their part, the team paid off all debts, and the player's salaries through the end of the month before releasing them all from their contracts. The Gamecocks were owned by Pedro Meneses, who also founded Juarez City's first television station, XEJ-TDT (Channel 50).

== 1985 standings ==
Place	1985 League Cup	GP	W	T	L	GF	GA	%	Avg. Att.
1	South Florida Sun	6	4	0	2	9	8	.667	2,195
2	Dallas Americans	6	3	0	3	12	9	.500	2,400
3	Tulsa Tornado's	6	3	0	3	7	7	.500	500
4	El Paso/Juarez Gamecocks	6	2	0	4	10	15	.333	1,430

== Management ==
- (Mexico) Pedro Meneses, Owner
- (Mexico) Luis Garcia, Operations Manager
- (Mexico) José "Che" Gómez, Head Coach

== Team leaders ==
=== Scoring ===
USL Rank	Player	GP	Goals	Assists	Points
1	Josue Portillo	6	8	0	8
8	Miguel Carcamo	5	0	3	3
10	Arnaldo Correa	6	2	1	3

=== Goalkeeping ===
Player	GP	W	L	Min	SH	SV	SO	GA	GAA
Juan Carlos Villalobos	5	2	3	470	73	17	1	13	2.49
Leroy Alexandre	1	0	1	90	9	-	0	2	2.00
