= List of NCAA Division I men's soccer career goals leaders =

In association football, or soccer, scoring a goal is the only method of scoring. In National Collegiate Athletic Association (NCAA) Division I soccer, where a player's career is at most four seasons long, it is considered a notable achievement to reach the 60-goal threshold. In even rarer instances, players have reached the 80 and 100-goal plateaus. The top 30 highest goal-scorers in NCAA Division I men's soccer history are listed below. The NCAA did not split into its current divisions format until August 1973. From 1959 to 1971, there were no classifications to the NCAA nor its predecessor, the Intercollegiate Soccer Football Association (ISFA). Then, from 1972 to 1973, colleges were classified as either "NCAA University Division (Major College)" or "NCAA College Division (Small College)".

== Key ==
Pos.	DF	MF	FW	Ref.
Position	Defender	Midfielder	Forward	References

*	Elected to the National Soccer Hall of Fame
Team (X)	Denotes the number of times a player from that team appears on the list

== List ==
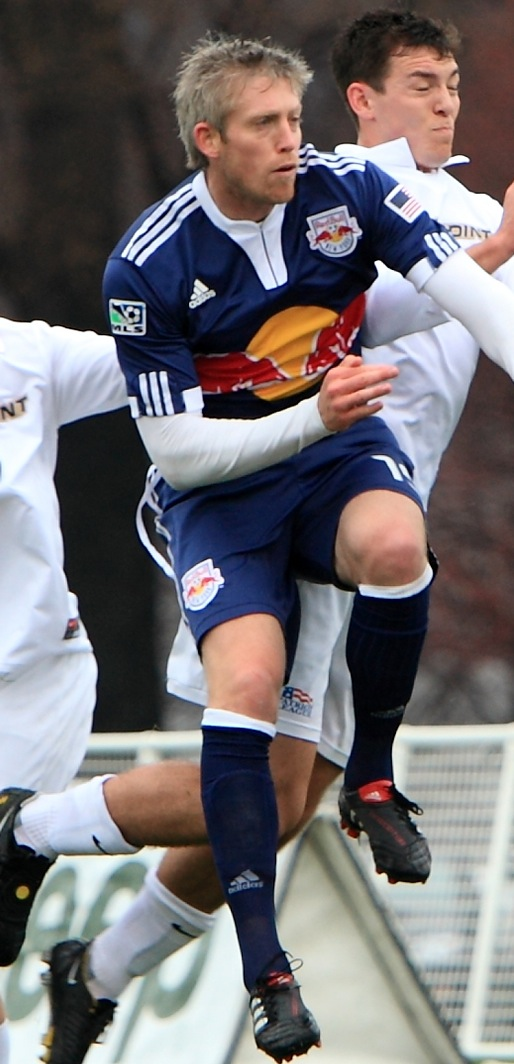
John Wolyniec scored 75 goals for Fordham.

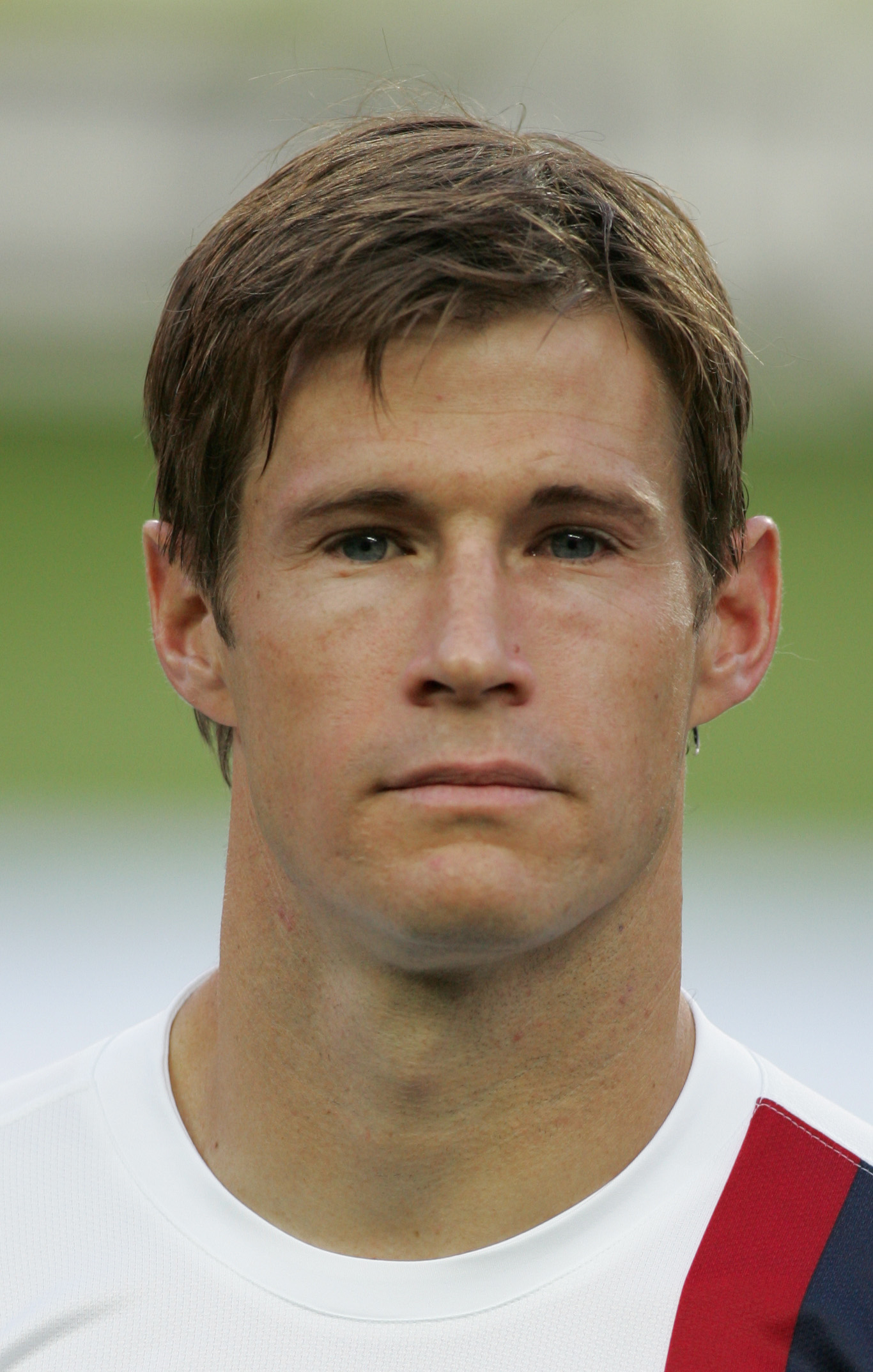
Brian McBride scored 72 goals for Saint Louis.

Nat.	Player	Pos.	Team	Career start	Career end	Matches played	Goals scored	GPG	Ref.
NGA	Thompson Usiyan	FW	Appalachian State	1977	1980	49	109	2.224	
USA	Herb Schmidt	FW	Rutgers	1959	1961	39	90	2.308	
FIN	Heikki Ritvanen	FW	UCF	1996	1999	69	88	1.275	
USA	Michael King	FW	Fairleigh Dickinson	1982	1985	91	87	0.956	
USA	Pete Milich	FW	Akron	1960	1963	48	85	1.771	
USA	Ken Snow	FW	Indiana	1987	1990	87	84	0.967	
SWE	Ole Mikkelsen	FW	UCLA	1977	1980	100	82	0.820	
USA	Dante Washington	FW	Radford	1988	1992	88	82	0.932	
BER	Dale Russell	FW	Philadelphia U	1973	1976	66	81	1.227	
URS	Dov Markus	FW	LIU Brooklyn	1965	1967	48	78	1.625	
NGA	Sam Okpodu	FW	NC State	1981	1984	79	78	0.987	
USA	Steve Burks	FW	Indiana (2)	1973	1976	72	77	1.069	
CAN	Nick Papadakis	FW	Hartwick	1963	1966	43	76	1.767	
ETH	Shoa Agonafer	FW	UCLA	1969	1972	70	76	1.086	
USA	Robert Ukrop	FW	Davidson	1988	1992	95	76	0.800	
JAM	Wolde Harris	FW	Clemson	1993	1995	61	76	1.246	
USA	Cesidio Colasante	MF	La Salle	1994	1997	77	76	0.987	
USA	Ismael Perez	MF	San Jose State	1975	1978	60	75	1.250	
USA	John Wolyniec	FW	Fordham	1995	1998	81	75	0.926	
ISL	Siggi Eyjólfsson	MF	UNC Greensboro	1995	1998	87	75	0.862	
NGA	Nnamdi Nwokocha	MF	Clemson (2)	1979	1982	63	74	1.174	
IRL	David Doyle	FW	Campbell	1983	1986	75	72	0.960	
USA	Brian McBride*	FW	Saint Louis	1990	1993	89	72	0.809	
USA	Jeff Gaffney	FW	Virginia	1982	1985	84	69	0.821	
ESP	Manuel Hernandez	FW	San Jose State (2)	1975	1978	47	68	1.447	
USA	Mark Erwin	FW	Wake Forest	1980	1983	83	68	0.819	
USA	Keith DeFini	FW	Creighton	1990	1993	77	68	0.883	
FIN	Toni Siikala	FW	Campbell (2)	1992	1995	60	68	1.133	
