= Brian Harvey (footballer, born 1947) =

English footballer and American collegiate soccer coach

Personal information
- Date of birth: 12 January 1947
- Place of birth: Liverpool, England
- Date of death: 13 January 2023 (aged 76)
- Place of death: Oklahoma City, U.S.
- Position: Midfielder

Youth career
- 1963: Sheffield Wednesday

Senior career*
Years	Team	Apps	(Gls)
1964–1965	Chester	1	(0)
- South Coast United
1968–1970	Dallas Tornado	45	(4)
1971–1973	Caroline Hill		
1973–1974	Kwong Wah		
1974	Melbourne Hakoah		
1974–1977	Urban Services		

Managerial career
- ????–1977: Urban Services (player-coach)
- 1982–1984: Oklahoma City Slickers
- 1985: Tulsa Tornados
- 1986–????: Oklahoma City Stars
- 1990–1992: Oklahoma City Spirit
- * Club domestic league appearances and goals

Brian Harvey (12 January 1947 – 13 January 2023) was an English footballer. He was the brother of once-capped England man Colin Harvey.

== Player ==
Harvey played one game for Chester during the 1964–1965 season. In 1966, he graduated from St. Bonaventure. A member of the Dallas Tornado World Tour in 1967-1968, he then moved to the United States where he signed with the Dallas Tornado of the North American Soccer League. He then embarked on a career playing in Australia. In September 1971, he moved to Hong Kong to play for Caroline Hill.

== Manager ==
In 1982, Harvey became the head coach of Oklahoma City Slickers, playing in the American Soccer League. That season, he took the Slickers to the championship game and was named the 1982 Coach of the Year. In 1984, the Slickers moved to the United Soccer League where it played as the Oklahoma City Stampede. In 1985, the team moved to Tulsa, becoming the Tulsa Tornados. Harvey remained head coach for each of the team's four seasons. In 1986, Harvey established the men's soccer team at Oklahoma City University. In 1994, he began the women's soccer team.

== Personal life ==
Brian Harvey was the brother of Colin Harvey, who played for and managed his hometown club Everton. Colin also represented Sheffield Wednesday, and received one cap for England.
