= 1983 American Soccer League =

American Soccer League 1983 season
- Season: 1983
- Teams: 6
- Champions: Jacksonville Tea Men
- Premiers: Jacksonville Tea Men
- 1984 CONCACAF Champions' Cup: Jacksonville Tea Men
- Top goalscorer: Jeff Bourne (17)

Statistics of the American Soccer League II for the 1983 season.

== League standings ==
Eastern Division
Pos	Team	Pld	W	L	GF	GA	BP	Pts
1	Jacksonville Tea Men	25	18	7	62	36	54	144
2	Pennsylvania Stoners	25	12	13	46	48	46	106
3	Carolina Lightnin'	25	12	13	43	37	43	103

Source: rsssf.com

Western Division
Pos	Team	Pld	W	L	GF	GA	BP	Pts
1	Dallas Americans	25	13	12	48	40	47	112
2	Detroit Express	25	12	13	36	44	38	98
3	Oklahoma City Slickers	25	8	17	27	57	26	66

Source: rsssf.com

== Playoffs ==
=== Bracket ===
Semifinals; Best-of-3
1	Jacksonville Tea Men	0(1)	2	2
4	Carolina Lightnin'	0(3)	0	0
2	Dallas Americans	0	3	0
3	Pennsylvania Stoners	5	1	1

ASL Championship; Best-of-3
1	Jacksonville Tea Men	0	4	1
3	Pennsylvania Stoners	3	1	0

=== Semi-finals ===
Higher seed	Series	Lower seed	Game 1	Game 2	Mini-game	Attendance
Dallas Americans	1–2	Pennsylvania Stoners	0–5	3–1	0–1	August 10 • BSD Stadium • 1,807; August 13 • John Clark Stadium • 5,437
Jacksonville Tea Men	2–1	Carolina Lightnin'	0–0 (1–3)	2–0	2–0	August 10 • Memorial Stadium • 5,464; August 13 • Gator Bowl • 8,002

=== ASL Championship ===
Higher seed	Series	Lower seed	Game 1	Game 2	Game 3	Attendance
Jacksonville Tea Men	2–1	Pennsylvania Stoners	0–3	4–1	1–0	August 17 • BSD Stadium • 3,028; August 19 • Gator Bowl • 7,130; August 21 • Gator Bowl • 7,326
