= Herb Schmidt =

American soccer player-coach

Personal information
- Full name: Herbert Schmidt
- Place of birth: Summit, New Jersey, U.S.
- Position: Forward

College career
Years	Team	Apps	(Gls)
1959–1961	Rutgers Scarlet Knights	39	(90)

Senior career*
Years	Team	Apps	(Gls)
1960	New York Hota		

Managerial career
- 1963: Penn State Nittany Lions (assistant lacrosse)
- 1964: Penn State Nittany Lions (lacrosse)
- 1967: Lafayette College
- 1968–1973: Penn State Nittany Lions (soccer)
- * Club domestic league appearances and goals

Herbert Schmidt is an American retired soccer and lacrosse player and coach. He holds the second most career men's NCAA goals and the most by an American player.

== Player ==
Schmidt grew up in Summit, New Jersey and graduated from Summit High School where he played basketball and was captain of the 1957 boys' soccer team. He then attended Rutgers University where he was a 1960 First Team and 1961 Honorable Mention All American soccer player. He was also a two-time Lacrosse All-American. He is listed under several categories in the NCAA soccer record book and is a member of the Rutgers Athletic Hall of Fame. In 1960, he played for New York Hota of the German American Soccer League.

== Coach ==
In 1963, Penn State University hired Schmidt as assistant lacrosse coach. In 1964, he became head coach of the lacrosse team. In 1965, he was drafted into the Army. Upon his release in 1968, he served one year as both the lacrosse and soccer coach at Lafayette College, but returned to Penn State in 1968, at which time, he became the head coach of the men's soccer team. He served as head coach until replaced by Walter Bahr in 1974. He had compiled a 38–21–8 and taken the team to four NCAA post-season tournaments. In 1986, Schmidt became the Associate Athletic Director, a position he held until his retirement in 2006.
