= 2005 Maryland Terrapins men's soccer team =

American college soccer season

2005 Maryland Terrapins men's soccer

NCAA Tournament National Champions
- Conference: Atlantic Coast Conference
- U. Soc. Coaches poll: No. 1
- TopDrawerSoccer.com: No. 1
- Record: 19–4–2 (7–1–0 ACC)
- Head coach: Sasho Cirovski (13th season)
- Home stadium: Ludwig Field

2005 ACC men's soccer standings
	Conf.					Overall
Team	W		L		T	W		L		T
No. 1 Maryland +	7	–	1	–	0	19	–	4	–	2
No. 10 Virginia +	6	–	2	–	0	12	–	5	–	3
No. 23 NC State +	4	–	3	–	1	11	–	7	–	1
No. 18 Virginia Tech +	3	–	2	–	3	10	–	5	–	5
No. 14 Duke ‡	3	–	3	–	2	12	–	5	–	3
No. 5 North Carolina +	3	–	3	–	2	17	–	4	–	3
No. 4 Clemson +	2	–	4	–	2	15	–	6	–	3
No. 11 Wake Forest +	1	–	5	–	2	13	–	8	–	2
Boston College	0	–	6	–	2	5	–	9	–	2
‡ – 2005 ACC Tournament champion + – Invited to the 2005 NCAA Division I Men's Soccer Tournament; As of December 17, 2005; Rankings from United Soccer Coaches; Source:The ACC

The 2005 Maryland Terrapins men's soccer team represented the University of Maryland, College Park during the 2005 NCAA Division I men's soccer season. It was the 60th season of the university fielding a program. The Terrapins were led by 13th year head coach, Sasho Cirovski.

The 2005 season was one of the program's best seasons in history, as they won their second NCAA National Championship in program history, and third claimed overall national championship in men's soccer. It was their first title since 1968.

== Schedule ==
Date Time, TV	Rank^{#}	Opponent^{#}	Result	Record	Site (Attendance) City, State
Exhibitions
August 19*; 4:00 p.m.	No. 2	vs. No. 19 UConn	W 1–0		Jackson Field (850); Akron, OH
August 21*; 7:00 p.m.	No. 2	at Akron	L 0–2		Jackson Field (1,500); Akron, OH
Regular season
September 2*; 10:00 p.m.	No. 2	at Cal State Fullerton	W 7–0	1–0–0	Titan Stadium (777); Fullerton, CA
September 4*; 4:00 p.m., FSC2	No. 2	at No. 9 UCLA	L 0–4	1–1–0	Drake Stadium (1,129); Los Angeles, CA
September 9*; 7:00 p.m.	No. 12	No. 5 Santa Clara	W 3–1	2–1–0	Ludwig Field (2,827); College Park, MD
September 11*; 1:00 p.m.	No. 12	No. 15 VCU	W 3–0	3–1–0	Ludwig Field (1,292); College Park, MD
