= Jerome B. Friedman =

American judge

Senior Judge of the United States District Court for the Eastern District of Virginia
- In office November 30, 2010 – August 19, 2011

Judge of the United States District Court for the Eastern District of Virginia
- In office November 12, 1997 – November 30, 2010
- Appointed by: Bill Clinton
- Preceded by: Robert G. Doumar
- Succeeded by: Arenda Wright Allen

Personal details
- Born: February 19, 1943 (age 83) Newark, New Jersey
- Education: Old Dominion University (BS); Wake Forest University (JD)

Jerome Barry "Jerry" Friedman (born February 19, 1943) is a former United States district judge of the United States District Court for the Eastern District of Virginia.

== Education and career ==
Born in Newark, New Jersey, Friedman received a Bachelor of Science degree from Old Dominion College (now Old Dominion University) in 1965, and a Juris Doctor from Wake Forest University School of Law in 1969. He was a trust administrator for First Union National Bank from 1969 to 1970. He was in private practice from 1970 to 1985. He was a judge on the Virginia General District Court for Juvenile & Domestic Relations from 1985 to 1991. He was a judge on the Virginia Beach Circuit Court from 1991 to 1997, serving as chief judge from 1994 to 1997.

== Federal judicial service ==
On June 26, 1997, Friedman was nominated by President Bill Clinton to a seat on the United States District Court for the Eastern District of Virginia vacated by Robert G. Doumar. Friedman was confirmed by the United States Senate on November 7, 1997, and received his commission on November 12, 1997. He assumed senior status on November 30, 2010 and retired from the court on August 19, 2011.

== See also ==
- List of Jewish American jurists

Legal offices
Preceded by Robert G. Doumar	Judge of the United States District Court for the Eastern District of Virginia; 1997–2010	Succeeded by Arenda Wright Allen
