= 1963 Saint Louis Billikens men's soccer team =

American college soccer season

1963 Saint Louis Billikens men's soccer
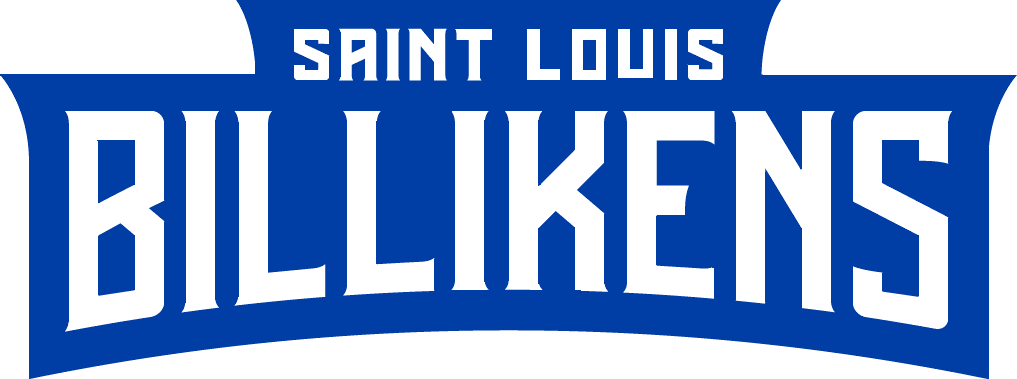

National Champions

NCAA Tournament, W 3–0 vs. Navy
- Conference: Independent
- Record: 12–0–1
- Head coach: Bob Guelker (6th season)

The 1963 Saint Louis Billikens men's soccer team represented Saint Louis University during the 1963 NCAA soccer season. The Billikens won their fourth NCAA title this season. It was the sixth ever season the Billikens fielded a men's varsity soccer team.

== Roster ==
- Bill Bayer
- Dave Behnen
- Fred Boyd
- Bill Brown
- Jim Bryon
- John Butler
- Don Ceresia
- Larry Cronin
- Bob Ernst
- Carl Gentile
- Jack Gilsinn
- Joe Hennessy
- Dan Leahy
- Kevin Kelly
- Terry Knox
- Tom Layton
- Raymond Mann
- Tom Mataya
- Pat McBride
- Mike Moore
- Jim Rick
- Gerry Schwalbe
- David Sirinek
- Adrian Vanderzalm

== Schedule ==
Date Time, TV	Rank^{#}	Opponent^{#}	Result	Record	Site City, State
Regular season
09-21-1963*		Air Force	W 4–0	1–0–0	St. Louis, MO
09-25-1963*		MacMurray	W 3–0	2–0–0	St. Louis, MO
09-28-1963*		Ball State	W 12–0	3–0–0	St. Louis, MO
10-04-1963*		Notre Dame	W 8–1	4–0–0	St. Louis, MO
10-12-1963*		at Wheaton	W 5–0	5–0–0	Wheaton, IL
10-13-1963*		at Chicago	W 16–0	6–0–0	Chicago, IL
10-19-1963*		at Washington University	W 12–0	7–0–0	St. Louis, MO
10-26-1963*		at Miami (FL)	W 6–0	8–0–0	Miami, FL
11-02-1963*		at Illinois	W 10–2	9–0–0	Champaign, IL
11-09-1963*		at Michigan State	W 10–2	9–0–0	East Lansing, MI
NCAA Tournament
11-21-1960*		California; First Round	W 2–0	12–1–0	St. Louis, MO
11-25-1960*		vs. West Chester; Semifinals	W 2–1	13–1–0	Brooklyn, NY
11-26-1960*		vs. Maryland; Final	W 3–2	14–1–0	Brooklyn, NY
*Non-conference game. ^{#}Rankings from United Soccer Coaches. (#) Tournament seedings in parentheses.
