= Dallas Americans =

Dallas Americans (Logo)

Dallas Americans was an American professional soccer club based near Dallas, Texas. The team played in the American Soccer League in 1983 and the United Soccer League in 1984 and 1985. Both leagues unofficially served as the second division of professional American soccer at the time. The team's home games were played at John Clark Stadium in Plano, Texas.

== 1983-American Soccer League ==
The Americans were created when Bobby Moffat, who had played in Dallas for the defunct Tornado of the North American Soccer League, organized an ownership group who purchased the rights to the ASL's dormant Golden Gate Gales franchise and relocated it to Texas. The Dallas side would bring the league's membership up to a very lean six teams for the 1983 season. The first Americans roster included several players who had suited up for the Tornado, including Neil Cohen, Kim Røntved, Billy Phillips, Jeff Bourne, and Wolfgang Rausch. Rausch and Bourne had played for the Oklahoma City Slickers the previous year, but the Americans convinced Rausch to return to Dallas to serve as a player-coach, and they outbid the Slickers for the chance to bring in Bourne on loan from the Wichita Wings of the MISL. Two other starters from the '82 Slickers would join Rausch and Bourne in Dallas, leading to a contentious rivalry between the two clubs.

On the field, the Americans got off to a strong start but slowed down towards the end of the season on their way to a 13-12 record. Bourne's 17 goals led all scorers in the league. By virtue of having the best record in the Western Division, they qualified for the playoffs, where the Pennsylvania Stoners eliminated them 1-0 in a mini game after the teams both won at home to split the two-leg series.

Though 1984 was to have been the American Soccer League's 50th season, the organization had been in a period of decline for some time. It had tried to expand from its traditional base in the northeastern states to the midwest and west coast in the 1970s and the southern states in the 1980s, but having such a large footprint stretched the modest resources of most clubs to the point of breaking, especially in the area of travel costs. What resulted was a league with a constant turnover of teams from year to year. At the annual January meetings, Americans owner Bill Spears and Jacksonville Tea Men owner Ingo Krieg decided that the ASL was not an atmosphere in which their teams could carry on. They worked over the weekend to lay plans for a new second division league, to be called the United Soccer League, that they hoped would solve some of the ASL's chronic structural and financial problems. By April 1984, all of the remaining ASL teams had either followed Dallas and Jacksonville over to the USL or chosen to fold, and the ASL quietly went out of business.

== 1984 and 1985-United Soccer League ==
The USL began play on May 12, 1984, with nine teams in three regional divisions. The Americans were in the league's Southwest Division, along with the Oklahoma City Stampede (a re-organized and re-branded version of the Slickers) and the Houston Dynamos. Most of the 1983 team returned for the 1984 season, but Jeff Bourne had suffered an injury while playing indoors with Wichita, and he would not suit up for the Americans again. The USL's Southwest Division would prove to be the league's most competitive, producing both the top seed (the Stampede) and both wild card teams (Dallas and Houston) for the playoff tournament. The Americans' 14-10 record was one game better than Houston's but the league had a standings points system that rewarded goals scored in addition to wins which placed Houston two points ahead of Dallas in the final ranking. That earned the Dynamos the right to host the wild card play-in game, and they defeated Dallas 2-1 to end the Americans' season on August 18.

By the following winter, professional outdoor soccer in the U.S. was in dire straits at all levels. The NASL had shrunk from twenty-four teams in 1980 to nine in 1984, and only a few of those teams were planning to return for 1985. The USL's teams found that revenues had not kept up with expenses in their first season despite the fact that the league was designed to be fiscally responsible through measures such as tight salary caps and schedules heavy on regional matchups to reduce travel costs. The last-ditch option of merging the NASL and USL in order to bolster the USL teams' finances and the give the last few interested NASL teams somewhere to play was discussed, but these discussions did not lead to an agreement and were called off on March 5. Almost immediately the NASL cancelled its 1985 season, and five USL clubs went dormant or folded while Houston withdrew to play independently.

Dallas elected to soldier on in the USL for its 1985 season despite the league only having three other teams: the South Florida Sun, the Tulsa Tornado's (who had moved from Oklahoma City and re-branded again) and the expansion El Paso/Juarez Gamecocks. None of the teams were on solid financial footing, and the situation became even more difficult when the league's commissioner resigned in April. To buy some time to attract more teams to join the league (a hope that would prove fruitless), the league re-arranged the schedule to take place in two parts: a six-game round-robin tournament among the existing four teams to compete for the "USL Cup" followed by a 12-game regular season. Play began in May, and signs of trouble were popping up all around. The Tornado's players and coaches, who had not been paid for several weeks, refused to participate in an exhibition game against the Americans on June 6 in Tulsa, and they did not travel to Dallas for a USL Cup game on June 8. Dallas was having its own problems making payroll, and team management was forced to offer players shares of stock in the team in lieu of pay. The Americans finished tied for 2nd place in the USL Cup Standings with a 3-3 record. On June 22, the Americans travelled to Fort Lauderdale to for the first "regular season" game. The 3-1 loss to the Sun would be the only game the USL would be able to stage in its second half. The Tornado's/Gamecocks match scheduled for later the same night was cancelled due to Tulsa's ongoing issues with team payroll and stadium rent. A few days later, creditors foreclosed on the bankrupt league and locked officials out of their offices. The USL voted to suspend play on June 25, and the Dallas Americans would be disbanded shortly afterwards.

== Year-by-year ==
Year	Division	League	Reg. season	Playoffs	U.S. Open Cup
1983	2	ASL	1st, Western	Semifinals	Did not enter
1984	N/A	USL	3rd, Southwest	Wild Card	Did not enter
1985	N/A	USL	2nd	No playoff	Did not enter

== 1985 USL League Cup standings ==
Place	1985 League Cup	GP	W	T	L	GF	GA	%	Avg. Att.
1	South Florida Sun	6	4	0	2	9	8	.667	2,195
2	Dallas Americans	6	3	0	3	12	9	.500	2,400
3	Tulsa Tornado's	6	3	0	3	7	7	.500	500
4	El Paso/Juarez Gamecocks	6	2	0	4	10	15	.333	1,430

=== 1985 team scoring leaders (USL Cup only) ===
USL Rank	Scorer	GP	Goals	Assists	Points
2(tie)	Hassan Nazari	5	3	1	4
7	Wolfgang Rausch	5	1	2	3
9	Tom Fazekas	5	3	0	3

== Yearly Awards ==
ASL Top Goal Scorer

- Jeff Bourne- 1983 (17 Goals)

ASL Top Points Scorer

- Jeff Bourne - 1983 (38 Points)
