= United Soccer League (1984–85) =

Former soccer league in the US

- Founded: 1984
- Folded: 1985
- Country: United States
- Number of clubs: 4–9
- Last champions: Fort Lauderdale Sun (1984)
- Most championships: Fort Lauderdale Sun (1)
- Most League Cups: South Florida Sun (1)

The United Soccer League was a professional soccer league in the United States in 1984 and 1985.

== History ==
=== Background ===
As the year 1984 began, professional outdoor soccer in the United States was crumbling. Both the higher-level North American Soccer League (NASL) and de facto second division American Soccer League (ASL) had undergone a period of ambitious growth in the 1970's, but the majority of teams at both levels had yet to figure out how to translate the attention generated by high-profile players such as Pelé and the recent surge in American youth participation in soccer into stability or profitability for the professional game. Both leagues suffered from a constant turnover in teams, with multiple clubs folding or relocating after every season. The ASL's push for national relevance included hiring Basketball Hall of Famer Bob Cousy as commissioner in 1974 and opening a headquarters in Manhattan as they expanded beyond their traditional base in the northeastern states and eventually became a coast-to-coast league. This boom turned out to be short-lived as the ASL teams operated at a smaller scale than their NASL counterparts, and travel costs for the far-flung league overstretched club budgets. The last of the west coast clubs folded in 1980, and the league completed its 1983 season with just six teams, all of whom were on shaky financial footing.

When the ASL owners came together the following January in Atlanta for their annual meetings, the Pennsylvania Stoners and Oklahoma City Slickers announced plans to go dormant, and Stoners president William Burfeind also resigned as league president. This left only four active franchises plus the Rochester Flash, who planned to re-activate after sitting out in 1983. In an effort to keep the league from shrinking to the point of collapse, the owners were considering adding as many as four new franchises in the coming season. However, a dispute arose over plans to have one of them based in Fort Lauderdale. The city had just seen the NASL's Strikers move to Minnesota and was a choice location with a community of soccer fans already in place. Jacksonville Tea Men owner Ingo Krieg chaired the ASL's expansion committee, which voted to award a franchise to a local group led by retired NASL all-star Ronnie Sharp. But, the owner of dormant teams in New York and Miami claimed that he should have first dibs on leading the Fort Lauderdale expansion effort instead, citing league by-laws that allowed inactive owners like him to retain territorial control and keep full voting privileges. By this point, the ASL had eleven inactive owners, and Krieg and Dallas Americans owner Bob Spears started to feel fed up with the fact that league decisions were being debated and voted on by a group that mostly did not have any skin in the game. Despite the fact that they both had been ASL members for only one season, they agreed that they had seen enough. They spent the weekend discussing the idea of breaking away to start a new league that would be better organized and more sustainable than the ASL had proven to be.

Their vision was a league that would avoid the overspending and over-expansion that had plagued both the NASL and ASL and would be more successful at building a grass roots connection between its member clubs and local supporters. Reasonable budgets, year round operation with an indoor season in the winter months, rosters featuring mostly American players to promote fan connection to home-grown talent, and measured expansion were a few of the cornerstones on which this new organization was to be structured. Almost immediately, the Detroit Express and Sharp's Fort Lauderdale group elected to join Jacksonville and Dallas in the new circuit, to be called the United Soccer League, and Dr. Burfeind agreed to be their commissioner (though he chose not to have the Stoners franchise come to the USL with him). In Oklahoma City, David Fraser, who had stepped in midseason to bail the Slickers out of a financial crisis in 1983 but then released his controlling interest that November after learning that the team was still saddled with significant debt, revived and renamed the operation as a new USL franchise so that they could start out with a clean financial slate. Similarly, staff and players from the Carolina Lightnin' were not out of a job for long following owner Bob Benson's decision to shutter the ASL team in February. An ownership group led by Felix Sabates hired a number of them when they were granted a Charlotte USL franchise in April. Initial excitement for the new league was strong enough that two NASL teams, the Tampa Bay Rowdies and Tulsa Roughnecks, were reportedly willing to consider the USL's overtures about moving over in 1985. By late March, Rochester chose to follow the crowd, and the ASL quietly ended operations.

=== Debut season (1984) ===
By the time the dust settled, Detroit elected not to field a team due to the new league not being sanctioned by the USSF. This left the USL with three direct transfers from the ASL (the Jacksonville Tea Men, Dallas Americans and Rochester Flash), two teams with new or modified ownership and new names but many of the same staff and players as their recently folded ASL predecessors (the Charlotte Gold and Oklahoma City Stampede), and four new teams (the Buffalo Storm, Fort Lauderdale Sun, Houston Dynamos, and New York Nationals). The clubs were organized into three regional divisions: Northern (Buffalo, Rochester, New York), Southern (Charlotte, Jacksonville, Fort Lauderdale) and Southwest (Oklahoma City, Dallas, Houston). In keeping with the league's commitment to modest budgets, a salary cap was put in place, and the schedule minimized travel expenses by having teams play half of their 24 games within their regional divisions. Because of this imbalanced schedule, teams would only have to travel once each to the six cities in the more distant divisions, and they were scheduled to go to all three towns in another division on the same trip, cutting down the need for air travel and overnight hotel stays to just two roughly week-long swings for each team.

The 1984 season got underway on May 12 and lasted until September 1. For a minor league that had been organized in just five months and had four members that were brand new, this first season was reasonably stable, with all nine teams completing their full schedules. Among the bright spots for the league was that several of the teams managed to sign players with experience in the NASL and/or MISL, elevating the quality of play, and a league-wide parity (even the top two teams only managed 15–9 records) led to many engaging and competitive games. But despite these successes, life in the USL largely ended up featuring the same substandard fields/stadiums, bare bones accommodations, and financial instability that had defined life in the ASL. In the league's troubled Northern Division, for example, the New York Nationals started 5–0 but then went just 5-14 the rest of the way after the club's money troubles prompted the head coach and several key players to leave a month into the season, and the Buffalo Storm, who were unable to host night games during the summer's hottest months due to their home field having no lights, averaged less than 1,000 fans per game at their home fixtures.

At the end of regular season play, Oklahoma City, Fort Lauderdale and Buffalo had qualified for the playoffs as division winners, and Houston and Dallas made the field as wild card teams. After Houston eliminated Dallas in the Wild Card game, they went on to upset the top-seeded Stampede in the semifinals two games to none. Fort Lauderdale swept Buffalo in the other semifinal series, with both games being played in Florida due to the Storm's pessimism about drawing any kind of crowd at 5:00 p.m. on a weeknight. In the very tightly contested best-of-three championship series, Fort Lauderdale prevailed over Houston two games to one with both the first and third games being settled by a tiebreaker shootout.

=== Contraction and collapse (1985) ===
Though the USL survived its first season seemingly intact, the league found itself in crisis heading into the winter of 1984/85. The owners were passionate about building up the sport, but almost none of them had the deep pockets and/or patience necessary to persevere through unprofitable early years while they gradually built up a strong network of sponsors, investors and fans. The indoor season planned at the league's founding never materialized, and in February, most teams failed to post a performance bond to demonstrate their readiness for another outdoor season. The NASL likewise found itself with only a handful of teams willing to commit to another outdoor campaign, and there were discussions about merging the leagues to stave off the demise of both. The sides failed to come to an agreement, though, and USL commissioner Burfeind announced that there would be no merger on March 5. By the end of the month, the NASL had abandoned plans for a 1985 season, and Houston had left the USL to be independent while five other clubs (New York, Rochester, Buffalo, Charlotte and Jacksonville) had gone dormant or folded. Only Dallas, Fort Lauderdale (who were renamed South Florida Sun), and the Tulsa Tornado's (who had re-located in December from Oklahoma City and had also been renamed) chose to return. The El Paso/Juarez Gamecocks were added as an expansion team to bring USL membership to a paltry four teams for the 1985 season.

Once the league line up had been finalized, they re-organized the schedule to be divided into two parts with slim hopes that they may manage to attract some more members before the second part was to begin. They opened play with a round-robin tournament for the "USL Cup" with each team playing the other three once at home and once on the road. Signs of trouble were all around. Commissioner Burfeind resigned just as USL Cup play got underway. The Dallas Americans ran out of cash and were forced to offer the players shares of team stock in place of paychecks. Tulsa also fell behind on payroll as well as stadium rent, and the unpaid players and coaches refused to suit up for a home exhibition game on June 6 or travel to Dallas on June 8 for a Cup game. When a new investor group led by former University of Oklahoma and professional football player Jimbo Elrod made an offer to become majority owners of the Tulsa franchise and take some other steps to help the league avoid collapse, the Tornado's did manage to piece together a roster and travel to Fort Lauderdale to play the final match of the USL Cup round on June 15. Despite having payroll issues of their own, the South Florida Sun defeated Tulsa 1-0 to clinch the best record and claim the cup. As a harbinger of things to come, there was no physical trophy on hand to present to the winners, causing Sun player-coach Keith Weller to quip "There ain't no cup." No new teams had joined the league by June 22, when the 12-game regular season was scheduled to begin. The Tornado's/Gamecocks match scheduled for that night was cancelled because the Tornado's stadium rent and payroll issues remained unresolved. This may have been just as well, as the Gamecocks owner had already quietly ended his relationship with the league, paid bills and salaries through the end of the month, and released the players as of then. The Sun beat Dallas 3–1 at Lockhart Stadium on the same day in what would turn out to be the USL's final match. A few days later, creditors locked league officials out of their offices. Play was suspended league-wide on June 25, and a few days later Jimbo Elrod's group withdrew their rescue offer, leaving no way for the USL to carry on.

The demise of the USL and NASL (which would never realize its stated goal of relaunching in 1986) meant that for the first time in over fifty years there was no professional outdoor soccer league in the U.S. This was a temporary void, however, as the Western Soccer Alliance and third incarnation of the American Soccer League would form and grow in the latter half of the 1980s, eventually to merge into the American Professional Soccer League, precursor to the USL First Division.

== Champions ==
Year	Champion	Runner-up	League Cup
1984	Fort Lauderdale Sun	Houston Dynamos	Not held
1985	Season canceled		South Florida Sun

== Teams ==
- Buffalo Storm (1984)
- Charlotte Gold (1984)
- Dallas Americans (1984–85)
- El Paso/Juarez Gamecocks (1985)
- Fort Lauderdale Sun (1984) → South Florida Sun (1985)
- Houston Dynamos (1984)
- Jacksonville Tea Men (1984)
- New York Nationals (1984)
- Oklahoma City Stampede (1984) → Tulsa Tornado's (1985)
- Rochester Flash (1984)
