= 1984–85 American Indoor Soccer Association season =

American Indoor Soccer Association
- Season: 1984–85
- Champions: Canton Invaders
- Matches: 120
- Goals: 1,408 (11.73 per match)
- Top goalscorer: Lesh Shkreli (59)

The 1984–85 American Indoor Soccer Association season was the inaugural season of the AISA. The league began with six teams, all based in the Midwest. Canton won the regular season by five games. Lesh Shkreli of Columbus ran away with the scoring title, and also won the MVP vote. Canton coach Klaas de Boer took home Coach of the Year honors. Louisville upset Columbus with a semifinals-sweep, and faced Canton in the finals. In the championship round, the Invaders handled the Thunder in four games.

== League Standings ==
Pos	Team	Pld	W	L	GF	GA	GD	PCT	GB
1	Canton Invaders	40	31	9	263	187	+76	.775	—
2	Columbus Capitals	40	26	14	305	261	+44	.650	5
3	Louisville Thunder	40	21	19	225	202	+23	.525	10
4	Kalamazoo Kangaroos	40	15	25	208	243	−35	.375	16
5	Chicago Vultures	40	14	26	194	267	−73	.350	17
6	Milwaukee Wave	40	13	27	213	248	−35	.325	18

Source: RSSSF

== Playoffs ==
Semifinals
1	Canton Invaders	11	14	9	–	–
4	Kalamazoo Kangaroos	10	12	2	–	–
2	Columbus Capitals	5	3	6	5	–
3	Louisville Thunder	6	7	4	6	–

Finals
1	Canton Invaders	9	8	4	3	–
3	Louisville Thunder	6	7	11	1	–

== League Leaders ==
=== Scoring ===
Player	Team	GP	G	A	Pts
Lesh Shkreli	Columbus	40	59	44	103
Neil Ridgeway	Kalamazoo	40	48	28	76
Kia Zolgharnain	Canton	40	49	25	74
Salvador Valencia	Chicago	37	44	26	70
Peter Knezic	Milwaukee	40	24	46	70
Jim Gabarra	Louisville	33	44	23	67
Mike Fall	Louisville	38	29	37	66
Art Kramer	Canton	38	39	24	63
Tim Sedlacek	Milwaukee	39	41	21	62
Tony Johnson	Columbus	38	35	25	60

=== Goalkeeping ===
Player	Team	GP	Min	SA	SV	GA	GAA	W	L
Mike Barbarick	Canton	28	1588	1359	491	114	4.27	20	7
Rick Schweizer	Louisville	37	2155	1902	806	177	4.93	19	18
Bill Naumovski	Canton	15	810	710	279	73	5.40	11	2
Bernie Watt	Kalamazoo	20	1186	985	427	109	5.51	7	12
Sepp Gantenhammer	Columbus	12	664	595	193	65	5.87	10	0

== League awards ==
- Most Valuable Player: Lesh Shkreli, Columbus
- Coach of the Year: Klaas de Boer, Canton
- Defender of the Year: Oscar Pisano, Canton
- Goalkeeper of the Year: Rick Schweizer, Louisville

== All-AISA Teams ==
First Team	Pos	Second Team
Rick Schweizer, Louisville	G	Mike Barbarick, Canton
Tom Alioto, Milwaukee	D	Mike Noonan, Louisville
Oscar Pisano, Canton	D	Keith Tozer, Louisville
Peter Knezic, Milwaukee	M	Neil Ridgway, Kalamazoo
Lesh Shkreli, Columbus	F	Jim Gabarra, Louisville
Kia Zolgharnain, Canton	F	Art Kramer, Canton
