= Memphis Americans (2021) =

Professional indoor soccer team based in Southaven, Mississippi

- Founded: 2021
- Dissolved: 2023
- Stadium: Landers Center
- Capacity: 8,500
- Owner: Andrew Haines; Michael Taylor
- League: NISL
- Website: http://www.memphisamericans.com

The Memphis Americans are professional indoor soccer teams based in the Memphis suburb of Southaven, Mississippi. They are the second team to use this name. This version of the Americans play in the National Indoor Soccer League while the original Memphis Americans played in Memphis, Tennessee from 1981 to 1984 in the MISL at the Mid-South Coliseum.

On April 29, 2021, the Memphis Americans were officially announced as a charter team in the new NISL to field both men's and women's teams. They play at the Landers Center in Southaven, Mississippi.

== History ==
=== The Original Americans ===
In May 1981, the Christian group Athletes in Action, headed by former stand out soccer player Kyle Rote, Jr., purchased the financially troubled MISL team then known as the Hartford Hellions and moved the team to Memphis. The team, renamed the Americans, played in Memphis through the end of the 1984 season before relocating to Las Vegas, for the 1984–85 season but retained the name "Americans". The team folded due to financial troubles at the end of the 1984-1985 season.

=== The Americans: Reborn ===
On April 29, 2021, the Memphis Americans were officially announced as a charter team in the new NISL to field both men's and women's team.

== Year-by-year ==
Year	League	Regular season	Playoffs	Avg. attendance
2021–22	NISL (men)	13–6	Runner Up	
2021–22	NISL (women)	15–4	Champions	
2022–23	NISL (men)	8-5	Canceled/Did not qualify	
2022–23	NISL (women)	10-3	Canceled/Champions	

== Head coach ==
Corey Adamson

== Assistant Coach ==
Bo Melson

== Memphis Americans Men's Team ==
Men's team
Player	Number
Bernardo Ferreira	9
Brandon Rothfuss	3
Cesar Ramirez	8
Cordarius Williams	15
Corey Adamson	4
Dustin Hammer	23
Dan Rodman	13
Djordje Djordjevic	33
Giovanni Alvarado	32
Jonathan Boggus	2
Jowayne Laidley	10
Kevin Valencia	6
Matthew Klinck	12
Mike Scharf	5
Paulo Ndenzako	22
Mike Scharf	21
Paulo Ndenzako	7
Samuel Castro 14	14

== Memphis Americans Women's team ==
Memphis Americans Women's team
Player	Number
Alexis Catt	7
Angel Hailey	1
Ashlynn Jones	22
Bailey Tadlock	24
Bruna Leiria	9
Elizabeth Fraysur	2
Jennifer Osmond	4
Julia Osmond	6
Kelsey Keown	10
Kim Urquia	3
Kristen Sparks	8
Lauren Odino-Draughon	5
Megan Angelino	23
Molly Ambrose	17
Rebeka Pasikazia	15
Stacie Murray-Owers	11
Sydney Walker	14
Tanya Crehan	19

== Arenas ==
- Landers Center, in Southaven, Mississippi
