= Yılmaz Orhan =

Cypriot footballer

Yilmaz Orhan
Personal information
- Date of birth: 13 March 1955 (age 71)
- Place of birth: Nicosia, Cyprus
- Height: 5 ft 11 in (1.80 m)
- Positions: Forward; midfielder

Senior career*
Years	Team	Apps	(Gls)
- Aveley
1976–1977	West Ham United	8	(0)
1977	Team Hawaii	24	(2)
1978	Houston Hurricane	13	(2)
1978–1980	San Diego Sockers	52	(5)
1979–1980	Hartford Hellions (indoor)	28	(22)
1980–1981	St. Louis Steamers (indoor)	35	(30)
1981–1982	Buffalo Stallions (indoor)	16	(12)
1981–1983	Kansas City Comets (indoor)	51	(73)
1983–1984	Memphis Americans (indoor)	47	(49)
1984–1985	Las Vegas Americans (indoor)	48	(22)
1985–1986	Baltimore Blast (indoor)	15	(2)
1986	Pittsburgh Spirit (indoor)	4	(0)
1986–1987	Kansas City Comets (indoor)	5	(0)
1987	Louisville Thunder (indoor)	21	(28)
1987	Milwaukee Wave (indoor)	6	(2)
- * Club domestic league appearances and goals

Yilmaz Orhan (born 13 March 1955 in Nicosia, Cyprus) is a former football forward who played professionally in the United States and England.

== Career ==
=== Early career ===
Spotted by Terry Matthews while playing for Aveley, Orhan made his First Division debut for West Ham United in January 1976. He made eight league appearances, and featured in one cup game, but failed to score while with the club.

=== North America ===
In April 1977, Orhan moved to Team Hawaii for the franchise's single season in the North American Soccer League. In 1978, he signed with the Houston Hurricane, but was traded to the San Diego Sockers during the season. He played through the 1980 outdoor season with the Sockers. He played on loan to the Hartford Hellions for the 1979–1980 Major Indoor Soccer League season. In the fall of 1980, he left the Sockers and dedicated himself to indoor soccer. That fall, he signed with the St. Louis Steamers. He moved to the Buffalo Stallions for the 1981–1982 season. In 1982, he moved to the Kansas City Comets. In October 1983, the Comets put Orhan up for a trade after an altercation with the team's trainer. The team eventually waived him and he signed with the Memphis Americans. In 1984, the Americans moved to Las Vegas for the 1984–1985 season. The Americans released him at the end of the season. During the off-season, Orhan served his four-month sentence for drunken driving which led to his showing late to the Baltimore Blast with whom he had signed during the off season. In March 1986, the Blast sold Orhan's contract to the Pittsburgh Spirit. In the fall of 1986, he moved to the Kansas City Comets in 1987. He played five games for the Kansas City Comets before being released. He then signed with the Louisville Thunder of the American Indoor Soccer Association for the remainder of the season. In October 1987, he signed with the Milwaukee Wave.
