= Nick Kolarac =

American soccer player (born 1992)

Personal information
- Date of birth: May 10, 1992 (age 34)
- Place of birth: Pittsburgh, Pennsylvania, United States
- Height: 5 ft 9 in (1.75 m)
- Position: Midfielder

Team information
- Current team: Steel City
- Number: 10

Youth career
- 2008–2010: Century United

College career
Years	Team	Apps	(Gls)
2010–2014	Saint Francis Red Flash	75	(20)

Senior career*
Years	Team	Apps	(Gls)
2013	IMG Academy Bradenton	12	(1)
2014	Michigan Bucks	17	(3)
2014	Philadelphia Fury	10	(6)
2015–2016	Pittsburgh Riverhounds	20	(0)
2016–2017	St. Louis Ambush (indoor)	28	(8)
2017–2018	Fort Pitt Regiment	21	(5)
2019–2025	Steel City (Note: The team's name was changed from Pittsburgh Hotspurs to Steel City in February 2023.)	54	(16)
2026-	Bridge City FC	0	
- * Club domestic league appearances and goals as of 3:48, May 29th 2023 (EST)

Nick Kolarac (born May 10, 1992) is a professional American soccer player who plays for Bridge City FC in the MISL. He played in three different professional leagues in the United States including the USL, MASL, and MISL. Kolarac also played in the top 2 development leagues in the America the PDL and NPSL.

== Career ==
=== College and semi-professional ===
Kolarac was born in Pittsburgh, Pennsylvania, and was raised in Imperial, Pennsylvania. He played high school soccer for West Allegheny Senior High School and according to ESPN Rise he led the nation in assists with 39 his senior year 2010. Kolarac played for the Red Flash of Saint Francis University from 2010 to 2013. He appeared in 75 matches, tallying 20 goals and 14 assists over that time. While in college, Kolarac also played for the IMG Academy Bradenton of the Premier Development League in 2013, making 12 appearances. In 2014, he made 17 appearances and scored 3 goals for the Michigan Bucks of the PDL also. The Bucks would go on to win the PDL championship that season.

=== Professional ===
In 2014 following his college career, Kolarac trialed with the Colorado Rapids of Major League Soccer and was offered a contract by UMF Tindastóll of the 1. deild karla, the second division of football in Iceland. After playing for the Michigan Bucks, Kolarac signed with the Philadelphia Fury on August 10, 2014. Kolarac was the leading point scorer for the Philadelphia Fury and was the only player to start all 10 matches. It was announced on March 12, 2015, that Kolarac signed for his hometown club, the Pittsburgh Riverhounds of the USL. On January 11, 2017, Kolarac agreed to terms with the St. Louis Ambush (2013–) of the MASL. Kolarac went on to score his first professional indoor goal in his debut against the Florida Tropics It was announced on April 25, 2017, that Kolarac signed with Fort Pitt Regiment after the 16–17 Ambush season. That season Kolarac was a staple in the midfield for the club starting 10 out of 10 matches as well as being the leading point scorer on the team with 3 goals and 3 assists. Kolarac resigned with the Fort Pitt Regiment on May 1 for the 2018 season he was also named team captain for the squad. Kolarac played a crucial part in the 2018 season for Fort Pitt. He had 10 appearances for the club while also notching NPSL All Conference XI for the East Conference and led them to there first winning record since 2014. On March 26, 2019, Kolarac became the first signing in the history of the Pittsburgh Hotspurs. The club announced they were signing the veteran midfielder for the 2019 NPSL season. Kolarac led the Hotspurs to their first playoff berth in club history in 2021 with a 8–2 overall record in the Rustbelt conference. Kolarac had 3 goals and 4 assists on the season. Kolarac was selected to the 2021 all conference XI, and also won Goal of the season for the NPSL.

== Honors ==
- PDL Champion: 2014
- All-NEC First Team: 2013
- All-NEC Second Team: 2012
- NSCAA All-North Atlantic Region: 2012, 2013
- Led country in assists senior year high school 2009 with 39 assists
- Captain for Fort Pitt Regiment 2016–2018
- NPSL All East Conference XI Midfield selection 2017
- NPSL All East Conference XI Midfield selection 2018
- Named Captain of the Pittsburgh Hotspurs 2019-
- NPSL All East Conference XI Midfield selection 2019
- NPSL 2020 Members Cup Champion
- NPSL All Rust Belt Conference XI Forward selection 2021 (4th consecutive year)
- NPSL Goal of the season award
