= Memphis Americans =

- Founded: 1981
- Dissolved: 1984 (moved)
- Stadium: Mid-South Coliseum
- Capacity: 10,085
- Owner: Kyle Rote, Jr.
- Head coach: Kyle Rote, Jr.
- League: MISL
- Website: https://web.archive.org/web/20170913013705/http://memphisamericans.com memphisamericans.com (web archive)

The Memphis Americans were a soccer team based in Memphis, Tennessee that played in the original Major Indoor Soccer League (MISL) from 1981 to 1984. Their home arena was the Mid-South Coliseum.

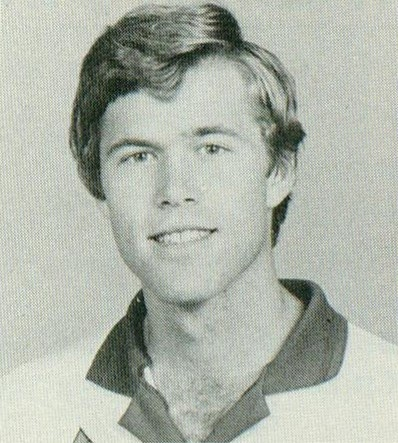
Steve Doerr

A new version of the team played in 2021 at Landers Center in Southaven, Mississippi, a suburb of Memphis.

== History ==
In May 1981, the Christian group Athletes in Action, headed by former stand out soccer player Kyle Rote, Jr., purchased the financially troubled MISL team then known as the Hartford Hellions and moved the team to Memphis. The team, renamed the Americans, played in Memphis through the end of the 1984 season before relocating to Las Vegas, but retained the name "Americans".

The team's first coach was German Horst Bertl, who was an experienced player and coach from the Bundesliga, but new to indoor soccer. In the later years to save money the team's general manager, Kyle Rote Jr, would coach the team.

The team was primarily stocked with talented foreign players such as Tony Carbognani, Helmut Dudek and Stan Stamenkovic. Some Hartford players came with the franchise to Memphis, including Thomas Nevers, Hank Liotart and Bruce Rudroff. The Memphis franchise added young Americans like number one draft choice Mike Garrett and Steve Allison along with more experienced pros to round out the first year roster. The team was very competitive and finished at just under .500 in the first season.

The team had good attendance at the Mid-South Coliseum – averaging around 7,000 per game in the 10,000 arena – but expectations were higher and even as they entered year two there was some expectation that the ownership needed to do better. A new group of owners were added shortly after that and included local owners that would provide more attention to franchise operations. In year two the team continued to compete at around .500 and play attractive soccer. After the end of their third season, the team was moved to Las Vegas – where they only lasted one additional year.

Several Memphis players continued to play professionally after the Memphis team, including Carbognani (MISL) and National Professional Soccer League (NPSL) players Stamenkovic, Kunovac, Garrett (NPSL player-coach with Toledo and Kalamazoo), and Dudek. Stamenkovic was known for his ball-handling skills and was among the recognizable players on the team. Dudek played as a defender and was known for his shot power. Garrett was an American player, and Carbognani focused on passing and ball control. Richard But was the primary goalkeeper, while Bill Mishalow served as the backup goalkeeper. Art Hughes, a native of Memphis, played for the team, blocked shots, and served as an ambassador to the Memphis City Schools, where he helped establish the school system's inaugural soccer programs.

The Americans average attendance in Memphis was 5,763 in their three years before moving to Las Vegas and becoming the Las Vegas Americans.

=== Resurrection and new league ===
In April 2021, a new version of the Memphis Americans were announced as charter members of the newly created version of the National Indoor Soccer League (not to be confused with what would become the third incarnation of the Major Indoor Soccer League.) The new team has adopted the history of the original franchise and joins the charter Fayetteville Fury and Columbus Rapids. On April 29, 2021, the Americans were officially announced as a charter team in the new NISL to field both men's and women's teams.

== Coaches & players ==
=== Coaches ===
- (Germany) Horst Bertl
- (United States) Kyle Rote, Jr.

=== Players ===
- (United States) Gary Allison (1983–84)
- (United States) Steve Allison (1981–84)
- (Poland) Richard But (1981–84)
- (Argentina) Tony Carbognani (1981–82) 43 Apps 39 Goals
- (United States) Steve Doerr (1981–1984) 100 Apps 17 Goals
- (Germany) Helmut Dudek (1981–82) 43 Apps 34 Goals
- (Chile) Jorge Espinoza (1981–84)
- (United States) Mike Garrett (1981–1983) 57 Apps 5 Goals
- (Socialist Federal Republic of Yugoslavia) (Croatia) Fred Grgurev (1983–84) 50 Apps 42 Goals
- (Germany) Bernd Holzenbein (1983–84)
- (United States) Art Hughes (1982–84) 101 App 79 Goals
- (Germany) Helmut Kremers (1981–82) 14 Apps 13 Goals
- (Netherlands) Hank Liotart (1981–82) 39 Apps 8 Goals
- (United States) Bill Mishalow (1981–84)
- (United States) Thomas Nevers (1981–82) 35 Apps 7 Goals
- (Cyprus) Yilmaz Orhan (1983–84) 47 Apps 49 Goals
- (United States) Bruce Rudroff
- (South Africa) Derek Smethurst (1981–82) 33 Apps 35 Goals
- (Socialist Federal Republic of Yugoslavia) (Serbia) Stan Stamenkovic (1981–83) 77 Apps 101 Goals
- (United States) Matt O'Sullivan (1981–84) 107 Apps 11 Goals
