= Air horn =

Noisemaking device

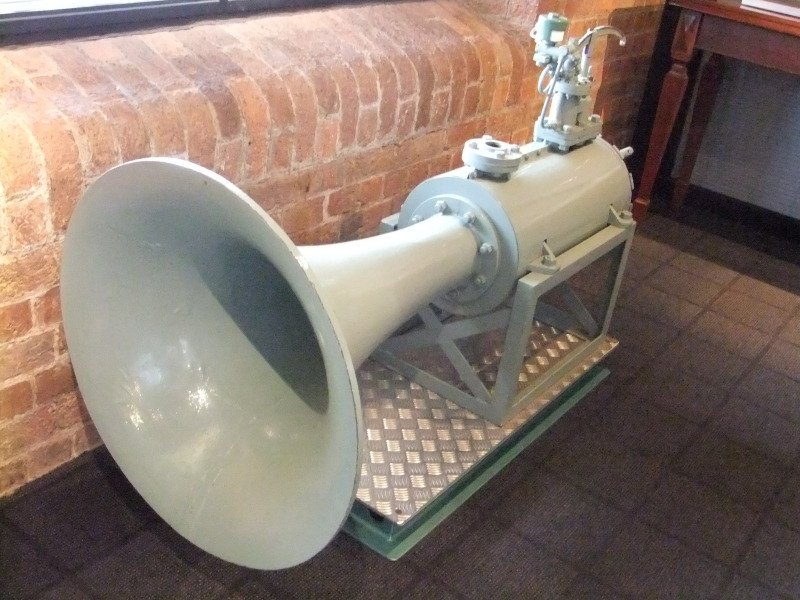
Steam whistle from a supertanker, in Merseyside Maritime Museum, United Kingdom

An air horn is a pneumatic device designed to create a loud noise for signaling purposes. It usually consists of a source which produces compressed air, which passes into a horn through a reed or diaphragm. The stream of air causes the reed or diaphragm to vibrate, creating sound waves, then the horn amplifies the sound making it louder. Air horns are widely employed as vehicle horns, installed on large buses, semi-trailer trucks, fire trucks, trains, and some ambulances as a warning device, and on ships as a signaling device.

== Operation ==
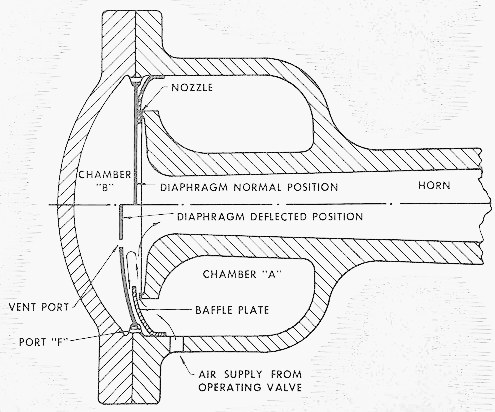
Diagram of a typical locomotive air horn power chamber, showing operation

An air horn consists of a flaring metal or plastic horn or trumpet (called the "bell") attached to a small air chamber containing a metal reed or diaphragm in the throat of the horn. Compressed air flows from an inlet line through a narrow opening past the reed or diaphragm, causing it to vibrate, which creates sound waves. The flaring horn serves as an acoustic impedance transformer to improve the transfer of sound energy from the diaphragm to the open air, making the sound louder. In most horns it also determines the pitch of the sound. When vibrated by the diaphragm, the column of air in the horn vibrates in standing waves. The length of the horn determines the wavelength of the sound waves generated, and thus the fundamental frequency (pitch) of the note produced by the horn. The longer the horn, the lower the pitch.

Larger air horns used on ships and foghorns function similarly to a whistle; instead of a diaphragm the air escapes from a closed cylindrical resonator chamber through a precisely shaped slit directed against a knife edge (fipple). The air blowing past the knife edge oscillates, creating sound waves. The oscillations excite standing waves in the resonator chamber, so the length of the chamber determines the pitch of the note produced.

== Trucks and buses ==
In trucks and buses, the air horn is powered with compressed air from the vehicle's air brake system. In trucks, a cord mounted on the ceiling of the operator's cab is pulled or in buses, a valve lever on the side of the dashboard is pushed down or pulled up to open the valve, supplying varying amounts of air to the horn. Thus, an outstretched hand reaching upward and pumping is a signal to the driver of an air horn equipped vehicle, requesting a toot. In modern trucks and buses, the horn is actuated by a button on the steering wheel (just like a normal car horn). Some trucks and buses have both electric and air horn, selectable by a switch on the dashboard. This is to prevent the use of the powerful air horn in populated areas.

=== Emergency vehicles ===
Toronto Fire uses air horn while responding

Many fire trucks, ambulances, and other large emergency vehicles operate air horns as a means of warning vehicles to clear the right-of-way.

There are also electronic horns for emergency vehicles, which produce a similar easily recognizable sound. These are typically integrated into the same system as the vehicle's electronic siren, and sound through the same speakers. In the last several decades, electronic sound systems with more widely varying frequencies have been chosen as common supplemental warning systems.

== Locomotives ==
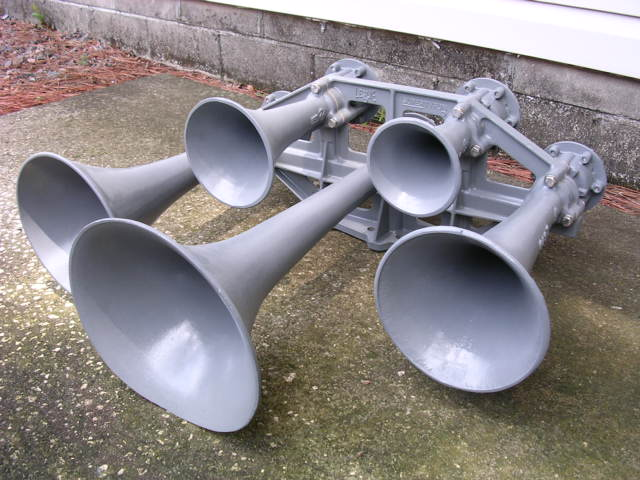
Leslie model S5T five-chime locomotive air horn.

Originally, diesel locomotives were equipped with truck horns. After an accident in which a driver mistook a train for a truck, the need for a unique-sounding train horn became clear. Consequently, North American trains now have at least two horns with different tones forming the airhorn, that sound simultaneously, creating a harmonic interval or chord. Each individual horn is called a "chime". Three and five-chime configurations are the most common, but two chime horns also exist.

Fifteen to twenty seconds before entering a level crossing, federal law requires locomotives to sound their horns in a standard warning sequence. This succession consists of two long, one short, and one long horn sounding repeated as necessary until the locomotive clears the crossing. Exceptions to federal law occur in locations with established quiet zone ordinances that prohibit sounding locomotive horns.

In recent years, it has become a fad for bicycle, car, and truck enthusiasts to install large air horns on their vehicles. Some jurisdictions do not allow an airhorn to be attached, whether or not it can be activated.

Cyclist Yannick Read attached a train horn to his bicycle and set the Guinness World Record for the world's loudest bicycle horn.

== Portable or personal air horns ==
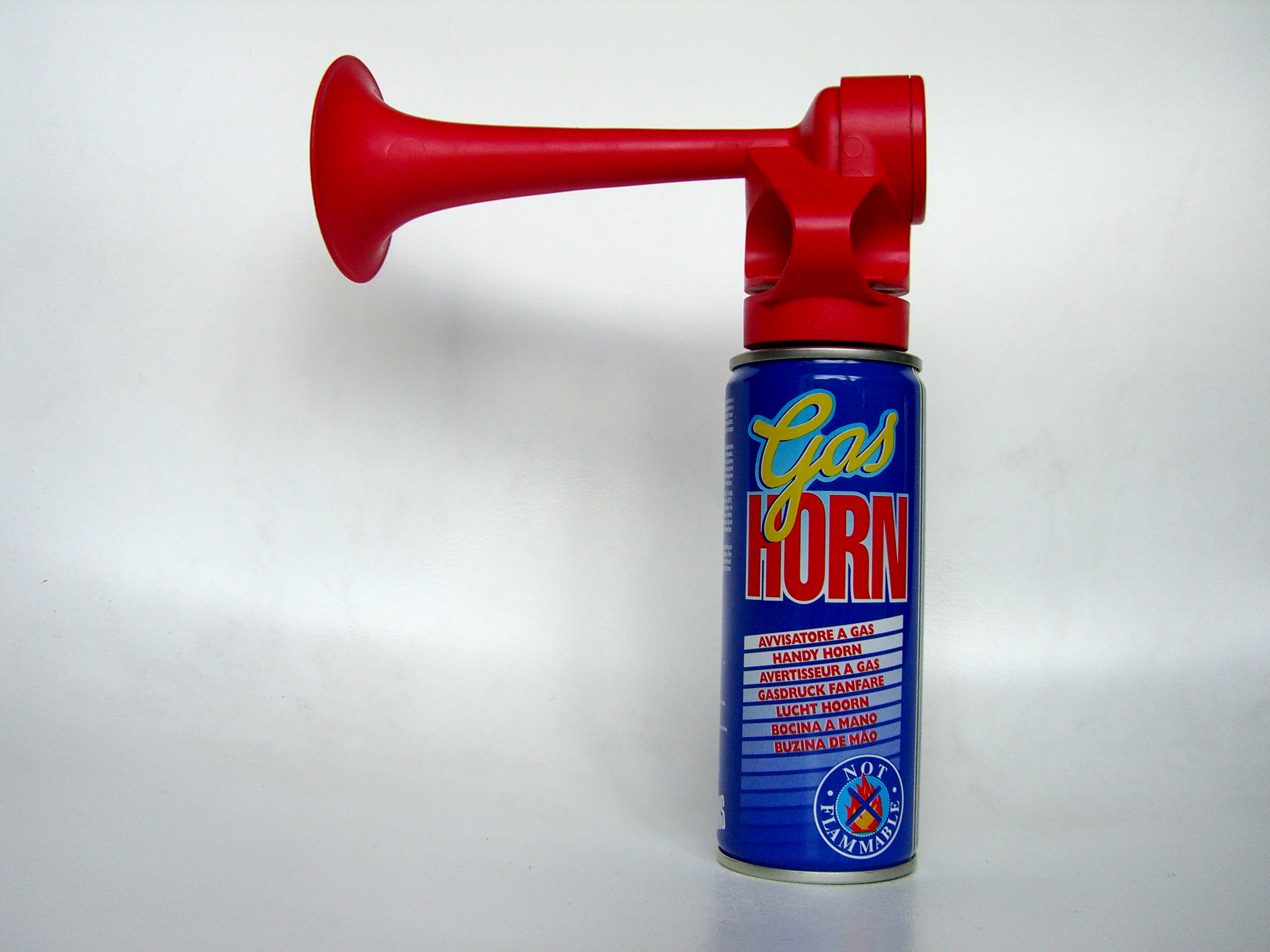
A small portable air horn used for sporting events, boating, or safety, powered by a can of compressed gas. It is operated by pressing a button on the top.

Portable air horns are also readily available packaged with a can of compressed gas as the air source. These are often sounded by fans at sporting events such as American football, basketball, ice hockey, and association football, and at other events such as graduations, and political conventions.

Small versions are sometimes used as bicycle horns, since they yield a louder warning sound than traditional bicycle bells or bulb reed horns.

Another use is as a non-lethal weapon for self-defense, mainly as an auditory distraction to get away from an attacker. For outdoor activities like hiking, hunting, cross-country skiing, canoeing, fishing, an air horn can be handy to frighten away unwanted or aggressive wildlife, signalling for help and to announce one's location.

Portable air horns (especially those that contain fluorocarbons) have the potential to be abused as a substitute for recreational drugs since many such refrigerants can be inhaled for a quick and dangerous intoxication.

== Use in sports ==
The air horn is used for signaling goals, home runs, touchdowns, and other points in various sports:

- Ice hockey
- The National Lacrosse League (NLL)
- Major League Baseball (MLB)
- Indoor soccer (Especially in the MISL)
- The National Football League (NFL)

NHL arenas normally employ two horns—a high-pitched horn (or a siren, as in the home arenas of the Boston Bruins and Montreal Canadiens) that announces the end of the period (or the start of instant replay reviews), and a much louder horn sounded when the home team scores and/or wins a game. Some MLB and NFL stadiums use horns for similar purposes, such as when a member of the home team hits a home run or touchdown. In many places, air horns are used for signaling the end of the period or quarter on scoreboard systems.

The idea of a goal horn in NHL ice hockey is said to have begun in 1973, when Bill Wirtz, then-owner of the Chicago Blackhawks, liked the sound of the Kahlenberg Q-3 on his yacht so much that he had another Q-3 mounted inside of the team's home arena, Chicago Stadium, to be sounded whenever the Blackhawks scored a goal. Since then, every NHL, AHL (with the exception of the Chicago Wolves, who instead use a siren and fireworks), ECHL, SHL, and CHL team has picked up a horn, including many more leagues.

In mixed martial arts, an air horn is commonly used to signal the end of a round as opposed to the bell used in boxing and professional wrestling. However, CZW, GCW, and other independent wrestling companies allow air horns, while major companies such as WWE and IMPACT Wrestling have banned them.

== Use in music ==
The air horn is a popular sample in reggae music. Jamaican dancehall music was the first musical genre to use the effect, and has been using it for over four decades, initially blasted live by Jamaican dancehall selectors and crowds in live shows as well as on mixtape recordings, and in Puerto Rican reggaeton, a reggae hybrid genre since the late '80s and '90s. The sound effect has been used in hip hop and electronic music as well. New York DJ Cipha Sounds popularized the sample since 2001 on his radio show on Hot 97, and the sound is still sampled in music to the present day.

== Other uses ==
The "Air Horn Orchestra" gathered at the North Carolina Governor's Mansion every Wednesday for 30 weeks from April 13, 2016, until November 2, 2016, to protest the state's Public Facilities Privacy & Security Act, also known then as House Bill 2, and Governor Pat McCrory by making a loud, disruptive noise. The 30th and final performance on November 2 was expected to set the Guinness World Record for the number of simultaneously sounding air horns, having had 342 participants. This was the last performance owing to the gubernatorial election six days later.

== See also ==
- Vuvuzela
- Train horn
- Foghorn
