= 1990 Major League Baseball draft =

Baseball draft of amateur players

General information
- Date: June 1990

Overview
- 1,487 total selections
- First selection: Chipper Jones; Atlanta Braves
- First round selections: 40
- Hall of Famers: 2: 3B Chipper Jones; RHP Mike Mussina

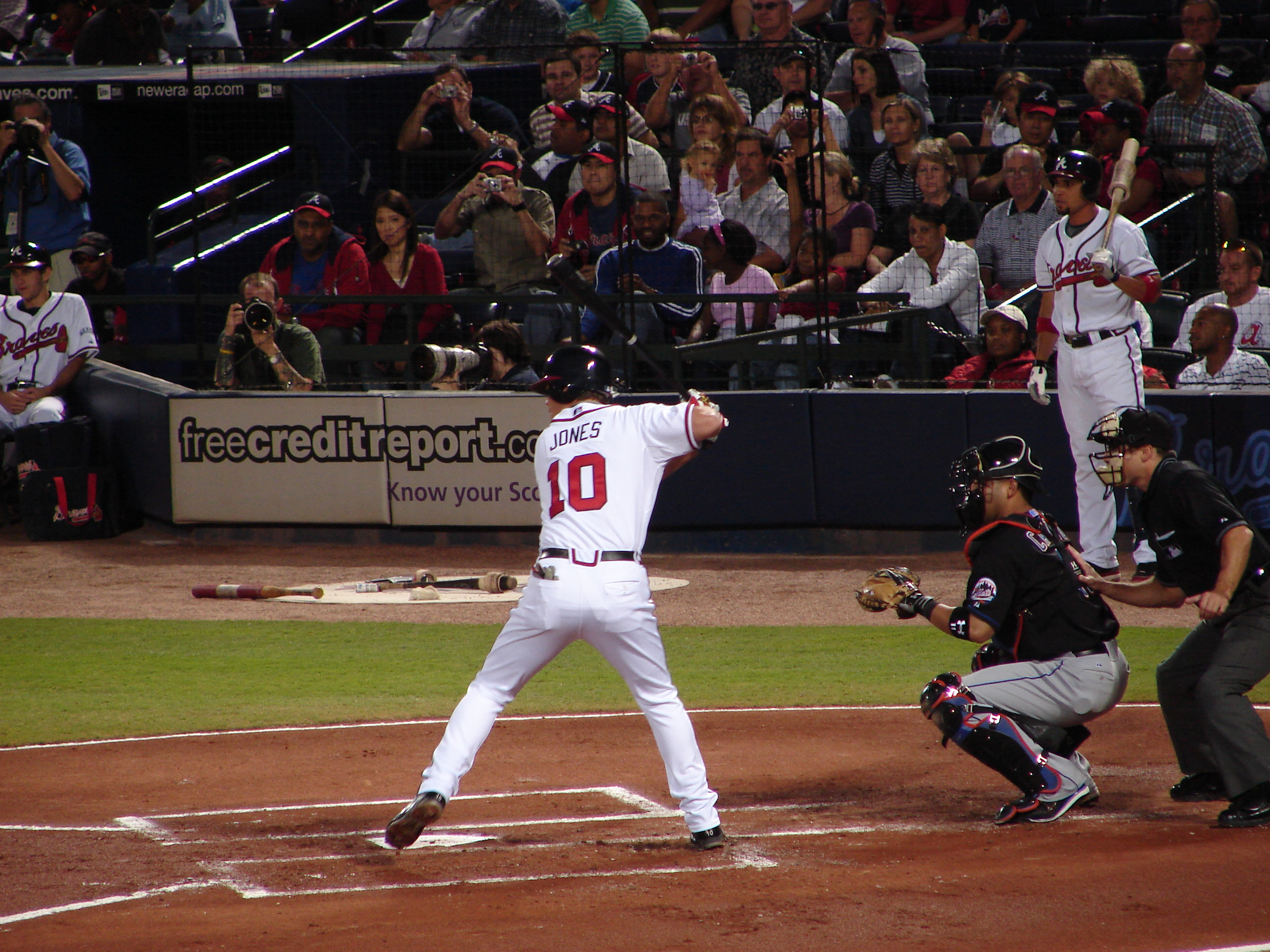
Number 1 pick in the 1990 draft and MLB Hall of Fame member Chipper Jones.

The 1990 Major League Baseball draft was held in June 1990. The draft placed amateur baseball players onto major league teams. 1,487 players were distributed to 26 teams. The draft consisted of first round selections, supplemental first round selections, compensation picks, and many more rounds, in fact, it went a record 101 rounds with 40 first round selections. With a league-worst record of 65 wins and 97 losses in the 1989 MLB Season, the Atlanta Braves selected shortstop, Chipper Jones out of the Bolles School with the first pick of the draft. Nine NBA and NFL players were drafted in 1990. Seven of the first 10 picks were selected directly out of high school.

== First-round selections ==
The following are the first-round picks in the 1990 Major League Baseball draft.

= All-Star	= Baseball Hall of Famer

Pick	Player	Team	Position	Hometown/School
1	Chipper Jones	Atlanta Braves	SS	The Bolles School (FL)
2	Tony Clark	Detroit Tigers	OF	Christian High School (CA)
3	Mike Lieberthal	Philadelphia Phillies	C	Westlake High School (CA)
4	Alex Fernandez	Chicago White Sox	RHP	Miami Dade College
5	Kurt Miller	Pittsburgh Pirates	RHP	West High School (CA)
6	Marc Newfield	Seattle Mariners	1B	Marina High School (CA)
7	Dan Wilson	Cincinnati Reds	C	Minnesota
8	Timothy Costo	Cleveland Indians	SS	Iowa
9	Ronnie Walden	Los Angeles Dodgers	LHP	Blanchard High School (OK)
10	Carl Everett	New York Yankees	OF	Hillsborough High School (FL)
11	Shane Andrews	Montreal Expos	SS	Carlsbad High School (NM)
12	Todd Ritchie	Minnesota Twins	RHP	Duncanville High School (TX)
13	Donovan Osborne	St. Louis Cardinals	LHP	UNLV
14	Todd Van Poppel	Oakland Athletics (Note: Pick from Milwaukee Brewers as compensation for signing of free agent Dave Parker)	RHP	Martin High School (TX)
15	Adam Hyzdu	San Francisco Giants (Note: Pick from Houston Astros as compensation for signing of free agent Ken Oberkfell)	OF	Cincinnati
16	Daniel Smith	Texas Rangers	LHP	Creighton
17	Jeromy Burnitz	New York Mets	OF	Oklahoma State
18	Aaron Holbert	St. Louis Cardinals (Note: Pick from Boston Red Sox as compensation for signing of free agent Tony Peña)	SS	Jordan High School (CA)
19	Eric Christopherson	San Francisco Giants (Note: Pick from San Diego Padres as compensation for signing of free agent Craig Lefferts)	C	San Diego State
20	Mike Mussina	Baltimore Orioles	RHP	Stanford
21	Thomas Nevers	Houston Astros (Note: Pick from San Francisco Giants as compensation for signing of free agent Kevin Bass)	SS	Edina High School (MN)
22	Steve Karsay	Toronto Blue Jays	RHP	Christ the King Regional High School (NY)
23	Lance Dickson	Chicago Cubs	LHP	Arizona
24	Rondell White	Montreal Expos (Note: Pick from California Angels as compensation for signing of free agent Mark Langston)	OF	Jones County High School (GA)
25	Robert Beckett	San Diego Padres (Note: Pick from Kansas City Royals as compensation for signing of free agent Mark Davis)	LHP	McCallum High School (TX)
26	Donald Peters	Oakland Athletics	RHP	St. Francis College

== Supplemental first round selections ==
Pick	Player	Team	Position	Hometown/School
27	Mike Zimmerman	Pittsburgh Pirates (Note: Supplemental pick for loss of free agent Jim Gott)	RHP	South Alabama
28	Gabe White	Montreal Expos (Note: Supplemental pick for loss of free agent Mark Langston)	RHP	Sebring High School (FL)
29	Midre Cummings	Minnesota Twins (Note: Supplemental pick for loss of free agent Jeff Reardon)	OF	Miami Edison Senior High School (FL)
30	Paul Ellis	St. Louis Cardinals (Note: Supplemental pick for loss of free agent Tony Peña)	C	UCLA
31	Brian Williams	Houston Astros (Note: Supplemental pick for loss of free agent Kevin Bass)	RHP	South Carolina
32	Scott Sanders	San Diego Padres (Note: Supplemental pick for loss of free agent Mark Davis)	RHP	Nicholls State
33	Marcus Jensen	San Francisco Giants (Note: Supplemental pick for loss of free agent Craig Lefferts)	C	Skyline High School (CA)
34	Dave Zancanaro	Oakland Athletics (Note: Supplemental pick for loss of free agent Storm Davis)	LHP	UCLA
35	Stan Spencer	Montreal Expos (Note: Supplemental pick for loss of free agent Hubie Brooks)	RHP	Stanford
36	Kirk Dressendorfer	Oakland Athletics (Note: Supplemental pick for loss of free agent Dave Parker)	RHP	Texas
37	Ben Van Ryn	Montreal Expos (Note: Supplemental pick for loss of free agent Pascual Perez)	LHP	East Noble High School (IN)
38	Tony Manahan	Seattle Mariners	SS	Arizona State
39	Samuel Hence	Cleveland Indians	OF	Stone High School (MS)
40	Stan Robertson	Montreal Expos	OF	Plainview High School (TX)

== Background ==
The draft went a record 99 rounds, surpassing 1989's total of 88, and included a record 1,487 selections. The Astros had the most selections with 100. Seattle followed second with 75. The 1990 draft included two Class A clubs, the Erie Sailors of the New York–Penn League and the Miami Miracle of the Florida State League. Rule 4 draft regulations permitted minor league clubs to participate. Erie made one selection, 24-year-old Brigham Young outfielder Gary Daniels. Miami made 16 selections, signing 15 of them, including All-American outfielder Paul Carey of Stanford in the fourth round. Atlanta made Chipper Jones, a high school shortstop from the Bolles School in Jacksonville, Florida, the draft's top pick. Detroit followed by picking outfielder Tony Clark out of Christian High School in El Cajon, California. The top three picks and seven of the top 10 choices were out of high school.

In the weeks leading up to the draft, the Atlanta Braves, having been awarded the top selection after finishing with the league's worst record from the year before, had narrowed down their options and were still largely undecided on whom they would take. One name most frequently mentioned was Todd Van Poppel, a right-handed prep pitcher who could scrape triple-digits with his fastball. Van Poppel, however, adamantly stated that he would not sign with the club if they drafted him, and fell to 14th overall due to his massive signing bonus demands. The Braves instead chose a shortstop from Jacksonville's Bolles School, named Chipper Jones, who would go on to be not just one of the greatest draft picks of all time, but one of the consensus greatest third basemen and switch-hitters in baseball history. Van Poppel, on the other hand, found very little success in the majors, and professional hitters exploited the lack of movement on his fastball and erratic command. Jones' endearing, easygoing Southern persona and remarkable consistency over his nearly 20-year career (all as a Brave) earned him a first ballot Hall of Fame selection.

== Other notable players ==
- Bob Wickman†, 2nd round, 44th overall by the Chicago White Sox
- Dave Fleming, 3rd round, 79th overall pick by the Seattle Mariners
- Rich Becker, 3rd round, 85th overall pick by the Minnesota Twins
- Paul Carey, 4th round, 100th overall pick by the Miami Miracle
- James Baldwin†, 4th round, 105th overall pick by the Chicago White Sox
- Mike Myers, 4th round, 122nd overall pick by the San Francisco Giants
- Garret Anderson†, 4th round, 125th overall pick by the California Angels
- Ray Durham†, 5th round, 132nd overall pick by the Chicago White Sox
- Bret Boone†, 5th round, 134th overall pick by the Seattle Mariners
- Mike Lansing, 6th round, 155th overall pick by the Miami Miracle
- Mike Hampton†, 6th round, 161st overall pick by the Seattle Mariners
- Troy Percival†, 6th round, 179th overall pick by the California Angels
- Kevin Young, 7th round, 187th overall pick by the Pittsburgh Pirates
- David Bell, 7th round, 190th overall pick by the Cleveland Indians
- Greg Norton, 7th round, 203rd overall pick by the San Francisco Giants, but did not sign
- Fernando Viña†, 9th round, 253rd overall pick by the New York Mets
- Tony Graffanino, 10th round, 264th overall pick by the Atlanta Braves
- Rusty Greer, 10th round, 279th overall pick by the Texas Rangers
- Darren Dreifort, 11th round, 307th overall pick by the New York Mets, but did not sign
- Pat Meares, 12th round, 329th overall pick by the Minnesota Twins
- Brian Shouse, 13th round, 349th overall pick by the Pittsburgh Pirates
- Mike Williams†, 14th round, 374th overall pick by the Philadelphia Phillies
- Rick White, 15th round, 403rd overall pick by the Pittsburgh Pirates
- Ricky Ledée, 16th round, 435th overall pick by the New York Yankees
- Dave Mlicki, 17th round, 460th overall pick by the Cleveland Indians
- Brian Daubach, 17th round, 469th overall puck by the New York Mets
- Marvin Benard, 20th round, 535th overall pick by the Philadelphia Phillies, but did not sign
- Damian Miller†, 20th round, 544th overall pick by the Minnesota Twins
- Eddie Guardado†, 21st round, 570th overall pick by the Minnesota Twins
- Andy Pettitte†, 22nd round, 594th overall pick by the New York Yankees
- Jason Varitek†, 23rd round, 625th overall pick by the Houston Astros, but did not sign
- Jorge Posada†, 24th round, 646th overall pick by the New York Yankees
- Chris Singleton, 30th round, 807th overall pick by the Houston Astros, but did not sign
- Jason Bere†, 36th round, 952nd overall pick by the Chicago White Sox
- Mark Sweeney, 39th round, 1032nd overall pick by the Los Angeles Dodgers, but did not sign
- Rodney Mazion, 48th round, 1222nd overall pick by the Seattle Mariners, but did not sign
- Alan Benes, 49th round, 1251st overall pick by the San Diego Padres, but did not sign
- Rick Helling, 50th round, 1269th overall by the New York Mets, but did not sign
- Al Levine, 53rd round, 1323rd overall pick by the San Diego Padres, but did not sign
- Kelly Wunsch, 54th round, 1327th overall pick by the Atlanta Braves, but did not sign

† All-Star
‡ Hall of Fame

=== NFL/NBA players drafted ===
- Chris Weinke, 2nd round, 62nd overall by the Toronto Blue Jays
- Jeff Brohm, 4th round, 109th overall by the Cleveland Indians
- Scott Burrell, 5th round, 150th overall by the Toronto Blue Jays
- Dino Philyaw, 14th round, 379th overall by the Cleveland Indians
- Mark Fields, 21st round, 565th overall by the Cincinnati Reds, but did not sign
- Kerry Collins, 26th round, 690th overall by the Detroit Tigers, but did not sign
- Greg McMurtry, 27th round, 716th overall by the Detroit Tigers, but did not sign
- Rodney Peete, 28th round, 742nd overall by the Detroit Tigers, but did not sign
- Bimbo Coles, 54th round, 1341st overall by the California Angels, but did not sign

Preceded by Ben McDonald	1st overall picks Chipper Jones	Succeeded by Brien Taylor
