= Bruce Rudroff =

American soccer player

Personal information
- Date of birth: May 11, 1955 (age 71)
- Place of birth: Jefferson City, Missouri, United States
- Height: 6 ft 0 in (1.83 m)
- Position: Defender

Youth career
- 1973–1976: St. Louis University

Senior career*
Years	Team	Apps	(Gls)
1977–1979	Seattle Sounders	36	(1)
1979–1980	Tulsa Roughnecks (indoor)	4	(1)
1980–1981	Hartford Hellions (indoor)	37	(2)
1981–1984	Memphis Americans	109	(4)

International career
1979	United States	2	(0)
- * Club domestic league appearances and goals

Bruce Rudroff (born May 11, 1955, in Jefferson City, Missouri) was a U.S. soccer defender. Rudroff played three seasons in the North American Soccer League and four in the Major Indoor Soccer League. He also earned two caps with the U.S. national team.

== College ==
Rudroff attended St. Louis University where he played on the men's soccer team from 1973 to 1976. The Billikens won the 1973 NCAA Men's Soccer Championship and Rudroff was a third team All American in 1974. He was inducted into the Billikens Athletic Hall of Fame in 1995.

== Professional ==
The Seattle Sounders of the North American Soccer League (NASL) drafted Rudroff in the first round of the 1977 College Draft. While he spent most of 1977 with the Sounders reserve team, he did see time in nine first team games after Mel Machin was injured. His time with the Sounders peaked in 1978 with twenty-three games, but he played only four in 1979. Following the season, the Sounders traded him and Tommy Ord to the Tulsa Roughnecks in exchange for Jack Brand, Roger Davies and David Nish. Rudroff did not sign with the Roughnecks, but with the Hartford Hellions of the Major Indoor Soccer League. When the Hellions moved to Memphis in 1981, Rudroff went with the team, which was renamed the Memphis Americans.

== National team ==
Rudroff earned two caps with the U.S. national team. Both came in losses to the USSR. The first was a 3–1 loss on February 3, 1979. The second was a 4–1 loss on February 11, 1979.
