= 2010 National Soccer Hall of Fame Induction Class =

These are the results for the voting for the National Soccer Hall of Fame 2010 induction class. Thomas Dooley and Preki Radosavljević were selected for the Player category, Kyle Rote, Jr. as a Veteran and Bruce Arena as a Builder.

The Hall of Fame inducts individuals in three categories, Player, Veteran and Builder. The Hall of Fame also selects individuals for special awards including the Colin Jose Media Award, Eddie Pearson Award and a Medal of Honor.

== Player ==
To be eligible in this category, a player must have been retired at least three years and not more than ten. Voting began on November 7, 2009 and ended a month later. Any player who was named on at least 66.7% of the ballots cast was selected for induction. Any player who received less than 5% of the ballots was dropped from the Player eligibility list and will be placed on the Veterans eligibility list when they meet the criteria for that list.

=== Voting results ===
Voters cast 117 votes. The balloting was tight with only two individuals exceeding the minimum of 66.7% required for induction.

Elected to the Hall of Fame:

- Thomas Dooley
- Preki Radosavljević

70.94%
68.38%

Not elected but remaining on future ballots:

- Earnie Stewart
- Shannon MacMillan
- Joe-Max Moore
- Marco Etcheverry
- Carlos Valderrama
- Cindy Parlow
- Peter Vermes
- Chris Henderson

58.12%
54.70%
52.14%
50.43%
47.01%
38.46%
37.61%
31.62%

=== Eligible players ===
The following individuals were also declared eligible for induction in 2010, but were not among those that got the top number of votes.

- Mike Burns
- Mauricio Cienfuegos
- Raúl Díaz Arce
- John Doyle
- Robin Fraser
- Eduardo Hurtado
- Dominic Kinnear
- Roy Lassiter
- Victor Nogueira
- Peter Nowak
- John O'Brien
- Mike Sorber
- Steve Trittschuh
- Tisha Venturini

== Veteran ==
On October 9, 2009, the Veterans Screening Committee announced the selection of the following ten candidates from a pool of 338 eligible players. On April 12, 2010, the Hall of Fame announced that, with 195 votes cast, Kyle Rote, Jr. was selected by one vote over Glenn Myernick.

Elected to the Hall of Fame:

- Kyle Rote, Jr.

60.42%

Not elected:

- Glenn Myernick
- Shep Messing
- Desmond Armstrong
- George Best
- Linda Hamilton
- Teófilo Cubillas
- Bruce Murray
- Bill McPherson
- Lori Henry

58.33%
50.00%
45.83%
43.75%
39.58%
38.46%
35.42%
20.83%
12.50%

== Builder ==
On October 19, 2009, the Builder's Screening Committee announced the selection of the following ten candidates from a list of 59 eligible candidates. On January 23, 2010, the Hall of Fame announced that Bruce Arena was selected for induction.

Elected to the Hall of Fame:

- Bruce Arena

77.78%

Not elected but remaining on future ballots:

- Bob Gansler
- Tony DiCicco
- Chuck Blazer
- Francisco Marcos
- Bob Contiguglia
- Don Garber
- Sigi Schmid
- Kevin Payne
- Fritz Marth

57.41%
51.85%
46.30%
40.74%
38.89%
38.89%
37.04%
25.93%
22.22%
