= Tim Sedlacek =

American soccer player

Personal information
- Date of birth: August 1961 (age 65)
- Place of birth: Seattle, Washington, United States
- Position: Forward

Senior career*
Years	Team	Apps	(Gls)
1979–1980	Seattle Sounders	0	(0)
1981–1982	Phoenix Inferno (indoor)	17	(0)
1982–1983	Dallas Americans		
1984–1986	Milwaukee Wave (indoor)	60	(56)
1987–1988	Louisville Thunder (indoor)	26	(8)

Managerial career
- Fife High School
- Highline Community College (assistant)
- 1990–: Highline Community College
- * Club domestic league appearances and goals

Tim Sedlacek is a retired American soccer forward who played professionally in the Major Indoor Soccer League, American Soccer League and American Indoor Soccer Association.

== Player ==
In 1979, Sedlacek signed with the Seattle Sounders of the North American Soccer League. He spent two years with the Sounders' reserve team. In the fall of 1981, he moved indoors with the Phoenix Inferno of the Major Indoor Soccer League. In 1982, he joined the Dallas Americans of the American Soccer League. In 1984, Sedlacek signed with the Milwaukee Wave of the American Indoor Soccer Association. He played two season with the Wave before finishing his career with the Louisville Thunder in 1988.

== Coach ==
Sedlacek spent two years coaching Fife High School. He also served as an assistant coach at Highline Community College before becoming head coach in November 1990.
