= Rick Schweizer =

American soccer player and coach (born 1959)

Personal information
- Date of birth: February 19, 1959 (age 67)
- Place of birth: New York, New York, United States
- Position: Goalkeeper

College career
Years	Team	Apps	(Gls)
1977–1979	New Haven Chargers		

Senior career*
Years	Team	Apps	(Gls)
1980–1981	Hartford Hellions (indoor)	0	(0)
1981–1984	Pittsburgh Spirit (indoor)	19	(0)
1984–1985	Louisville Thunder (indoor)	37	(0)
1986–1988	Milwaukee Wave (indoor)	25	(0)
1988–1989	Dayton Dynamo (indoor)	5	(0)

Managerial career
- 1988–1990: Dayton Dynamo
- 1991: New York Kick
- New Haven Chargers (women's assistant)
- * Club domestic league appearances and goals

Rick Schweizer is a retired American soccer goalkeeper who played professionally in the Major Indoor Soccer League and American Indoor Soccer Association. He was the 1985 AISA Goalkeeper of the Year. Schweizer coached both collegiately and professionally. He was the 1990 National Professional Soccer League Coach of the Year.

== Player ==
In 1980, Schweizer graduated from the University of New Haven where he was a three-year starter on the men's soccer team. In 1980, he signed with the Hartford Hellions of the Major Indoor Soccer League. In 1981, he moved to the Pittsburgh Spirit for three seasons. In 1984, Schweizer signed with the Louisville Thunder of the American Indoor Soccer Association. He was a 1985 First Team All Star and the 1985 AISA Goalkeeper of the Year. In 1986, he moved to the Milwaukee Wave for two seasons. In the spring of 1988, the Wave released him and Schweizer moved to the Dayton Dynamo. He briefly retired after becoming the Dynamo's head coach. However, he returned to playing when the Dynamo released goalkeeper Arnie Mausser in January 1989.

== Coach ==
On September 14, 1988, Schweizer became the head coach of the Dayton Dynamo. He coached the team for two seasons, being named the 1990 AISA Coach of the Year. On February 26, 1991, he became the head coach of the New York Kick which folded at the end of the season. In June 1995, the Connecticut Kicks hired Schweizer as head coach. However, the Kicks never played a game. He also served as an assistant coach with the University of New Haven women's team.
