= Major League Indoor Soccer =

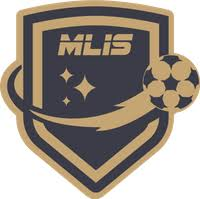
- Founded: August 2022; 4 years ago
- Country: United States
- Other club from: Canada
- Conferences: North, South
- Number of clubs: 15 (as of September 7, 2026)
- Current champions: Canadian Crusaders (1st title) (2025-26)
- Website: www.mlispro.com

Major League Indoor Soccer (MLIS) is an indoor soccer league that began play in 2022 and based in the United States.

== History ==
Major League Indoor Soccer was announced in August 2022 to begin play in December of the same year. The league launched with 12 teams divided among three divisions: East, Central, and South. The league's first game featured Rapid City FC defeat the Cincinnati Swerve 8-1 at GameTime Training Center in Fairfield, Ohio.

On March 29, 2024, the league announced a merger with the National Indoor Soccer League, keeping the Major League Indoor Soccer name.

Bernie Lilavois would be named new commissioner of the MLIS in November 2024.

In July 2025, MLIS announced the launch of Major League Indoor Soccer Extended (MLISX), an amateur league designed to provide a pathway to professionalism for players, coaches, and officials. The league will be operated by MLIS, but each franchise will be independently owned and managed.

== Men's teams ==
Active

On August 18, 2022, Chicago (Mustangs), Cleveland Crunch, and Grand Rapids (Rapid City FC) were announced as charter teams.

Former NISL team Central Florida Crusaders relocated to Toronto and joined the MLIS ahead of the 2024-25 season as the Canadian Crusaders, the league's first team based outside the United States.

Panathinaikos Chicago would join the MLIS for the 2024-25 season, though they would not return for 2025-26.

The league expanded to 13 teams for the 2025-26 season with the addition of Atlético Pro FC, Dallas CD La Cuadra, Boulder United FC Halo, Las Vegas Turf Monsters, Utah Uprising FC, Bridge City FC, and Rockford Thunder. The league would be redivided into two conferences, North and South.

In July 2026, the MLIS announced that the Tampa Bay Terror would be promoted up from MLISX, the first such promotion in league history. On September 7, 2026, the league added Mesquite United FC for both MLIS and WMLIS.

On September 27, the Chicago Mustangs left the league to rejoin the MASL2.

MLIS announced future expansion clubs in Nashville, Scranton, and Long Island to begin play in the 2027-28 MLIS season.

East Conference
Team	City	Arena	Capacity	Founded	Men's Coach
Atletico Orlando FC	Winter Park, Florida	Sofive Soccer Center Winter Park		2025	Victor Rada
Bridge City FC	Sewickley, Pennsylvania	Sewickley Sports Arena	2,000	2025	Travis MacKenzie
Canadian Crusaders	Toronto, Canada	Scarborough Soccer Centre	2000	2022	Lorenzo Redwood
Cleveland Crunch	Cleveland, Ohio	TBA		1989	Antonio Jose Manfut
Tampa Bay Terror	Lakewood Ranch, Florida	Turf City SRQ		1995	Dominic Coco
West Conference
Amarillo Bombers	Amarillo, Texas	Amarillo Civic Center	4,987	2018	Chad Webb
Colorado Foxes	Denver, Colorado	Foothills Fieldhouse		1990	Raymundo Reza
Dallas CD La Cuadra	Carrollton, Texas	TOCA Soccer and Sports Center Carrollton		2025	Jose Galarza
Mesquite United	Mesquite, Texas	Ultimate Indoor Sports Mesquite		2026	Travis Avant III

Inactive

Team	City/Area	Founded
Las Vegas Turf Monsters	Las Vegas, Nevada	2024
Red Cedar FC	Novi, Michigan	2024
Utah Uprising FC	Draper, Utah	2024

Future Teams

Team	City	Arena	Capacity	Founded	Men's Coach
Long Island	Long Island, New York	TBA	TBA	2026	TBA
Nashville	Nashville, Tennessee	TBA	TBA	2026	TBA
Scranton	Scranton, Pennsylvania	TBA	TBA	2026	TBA

Former Teams

Team	City/Area	Founded	Fate
Austin Emerald	Austin, Texas		Joined PASL
Cincinnati Swerve	Cincinnati, Ohio		Joined MASL3
Colorado Bucks SC	Littleton, Colorado	2023	Rebranded
Detroit Waza Flo	Detroit, Michigan		Joined MASL3
Houston Bolt	Houston, Texas		Joined PASL
Illinois Stateline Falcons	Rockford, Illinois		Folded
Omaha Kings	Omaha, Nebraska		Joined MASL2
Ohio Extreme	Lima, Ohio		Folded
Panathinaikos Chicago	Hoffman Estates, Illinois	2020	Left, still plays in NPSL
Rapid City FC	Grand Rapids, Michigan		Folded
Rockford Thunder	Rockford, Illinois	2025	
Summit City Sentinels	Fort Wayne, Indiana	2024	Demoted to MLISX
Springfield Demize	Springfield, Missouri		Joined PASL
Wichita Selection	Park City, Kansas		Joined PASL

== Women's teams ==
On March 12, 2024, the league announced the Women’s Major League Indoor Soccer (WMLIS) to begin play in 2024–25 season.

Women’s Major League Indoor Soccer (WMLIS)

East Division
Team	City/State	Arena	Capacity	Founded	Joined	Head coach
Chicago Mustangs	Hoffman Estates, Illinois	Grand Sports Arena		2024	2024	Armando Gamboa
Fort Wayne Fever	Fort Wayne, Indiana	Classic City Center		2024	2024	Sam Pech
New Jersey Angels	Wall Township, New Jersey	GoodSports USA		2026	2026	Carlos Figueroa
Zoo City FC	Kalamazoo, Michigan	Let's Play Soccer Portage		2023	2024	Michael Rayburn
West Division
Team	City/State	Arena	Capacity	Founded	Joined	Head Coach
Amarillo Bombers	Amarillo, Texas	Amarillo Civic Center	4,987	2026	2027	TBA
Mesquite United	Mesquite, Texas	Ultimate Indoor Sports Mesquite		2026	2026	TBA
New Mexico Lightning	Albuquerque, New Mexico	TBA		2019	2025	Steve Patterson
Phoenix Pulse FC	Glendale, Arizona	Arizona Sports Complex		2025	2025	Mike Navarro

Former teams
Team	City	Founded	Fate
Panathinaikos Chicago	Hoffman Estates, Illinois	2020	Doesn't play indoor, but has local womens program
Las Vegas Monsters	Las Vegas, Nevada	2025	
Summit City Sentinels	Fort Wayne, Indiana	2025	Rebranded into Fort Wayne Fever
Utah Uprising	Draper, Utah	2025	

== Championships ==
Men's

Year	Winner	Score	Runner-up	Site	Host City
2022-23	Grand Rapids City	16-7	Omaha Kings	Grand Sports Arena	Chicago, Illinois
2023-24	Cleveland Crunch	9-4	Omaha Kings	Baxter Arena	Omaha, Nebraska
2024-25	Amarillo Bombers	10-8 (OT)	Cleveland Crunch	Wolstein Center	Cleveland, Ohio
2025-26	Toronto Crusaders	6-4	Amarillo Bombers	Orleans Arena	Las Vegas, Nevada

Women's

Year	Winner	Score	Runner-up	Site	Host
2024-25	Chicago Mustangs	8–7	Summit City United	Wolstein Center	Cleveland, Ohio
2025-26	Utah Uprising FC	10-4	Chicago Mustangs	Orleans Arena	Las Vegas, Nevada

== 2025–26 season ==
as of February 2026 (standings subject to frequent change)

The MLIS is in its regular season with two conferences (North and South). Teams play a 12-game schedule, with the top two from each advancing to finals in Las Vegas (March 28–29, 2026).

Points: 3 for regulation win, 2 for OT/SO win, 1 for OT/SO loss.

=== North Conference ===
Team	GP	W	L	OTL	Pts	W%	RW	OTW	GF	GA	Diff	Home	Away	SO	Streak
x Toronto	12	11	1	0	33	.917	11	0	106	55	+51	6–0–0	5-1-0	0–0	W1
x Cleveland	12	10	2	1	31	.861	10	0	133	67	+66	6–0–0	4–1–1	0–0	W4
o Pittsburgh	12	7	5	0	20	.556	6	1	97	81	+16	4–2–0	3–3–0	0–0	L1
o Chicago	12	6	6	0	18	.500	6	0	89	91	-2	3–4–0	3–2–0	0–0	L2
o Lansing	12	5	7	0	13	.361	3	2	100	129	-29	2–4–0	3–3–0	0–0	W1
o Rockford	12	3	9	2	9	.278	2	1	67	108	-39	2–1–2	1–6–0	0–0	L1
o Ft. Wayne	12	0	12	1	1	.028	0	0	69	132	-63	0–6–0	0–5–1	0–0	L7

=== South Conference ===
Team	GP	W	L	OTL	Pts	W%	RW	OTW	GF	GA	Diff	Home	Away	SO	Streak
x Amarillo	12	11	1	0	33	.917	11	0	129	57	+72	6–0–0	5–1–0	0–0	W2
x Utah	12	9	3	0	27	.750	9	0	126	83	+43	5–1–0	4–2–0	0–0	W5
o Orlando	12	7	5	2	27	.639	7	0	101	68	+33	5–0–1	2–3–1	0–0	L3
o Boulder	12	5	7	0	14	.389	4	1	75	70	+5	3–3–0	2–4–0	0–0	L1
o Las Vegas	12	3	9	0	8	.222	2	1	59	118	-59	0–6–0	3–3–0	0–0	L5
o Dallas	12	1	11	0	3	.083	1	0	44	138	-94	1–5–0	0–6–0	0–0	L1

Legend: x – Clinched playoff spot; o – Eliminated from playoffs.
