= Canadian Crusaders =

Canadian professional indoor soccer club based in Toronto

- Full name: Canadian Crusaders
- Founded: August 4, 2022; 4 years ago (as Central Florida Crusaders)
- Stadium: Scarborough Soccer Centre
- Owner: Luigi Di Serio
- Head coach: Lorenzo Redwood
- League: Major League Indoor Soccer
- 2024–25: Regular season: 3rd Playoffs: 8th
- Website: www.cacrusaders.com

Canadian Crusaders is an indoor soccer team based in Scarborough, within the city of Toronto. The team plays in Major League Indoor Soccer (MLIS) and began play in the 2024–25 season.

== History ==
=== Central Florida Crusaders ===
The Central Florida Crusaders were announced as an expansion team for the National Indoor Soccer League in August 2022, to begin play in the 2022-23 season. The team played its home games Addition Financial Arena. The team finished its inaugural season with a 13-2 record, winning the 2022-23 NISL Championship.

=== Relocation to Toronto ===
In March 2024, the NISL was acquired by Major League Indoor Soccer. In August 2024, it was announced that the Central Florida Crusaders would relocate to Toronto, rebranding as the Canadian Crusaders.

Prior to the start of the 2025–26 season, MLIS announced that the league would be split into two conferences, with the Canadian Crusaders being placed in the North Conference. The Canadian Crusaders won the 2026 MLIS Championship, defeating the Amarillo Bombers, 6-4.

== Year-by-year ==
Year	League	Record	Playoffs	Avg. Attendance
2022–23	NISL	1st NISL, 13-2	Won Championship	1,000
2024–25	MLIS	3rd MLIS, 9-3	Semifinals	
2025–26	MLIS	1st North, 11-1	Won Championship	

== Arena ==
Canadian Crusaders play their home games in the Scarborough Soccer Centre in Toronto. During the team's time in Orlando, the Crusaders played at Addition Financial Arena on the University of Central Florida's main campus.

== Honours ==
=== Team ===
Competitions	Titles	Seasons
MLIS Champions	1	2025-2026
NISL Champions	1	2022-2023

=== Players ===
Honor	Player	Seasons
MLIS Goalkeeper of the Year	Filip Zendelek	2025
MLIS Goalkeeper of the Year	Filip Zendelek	2026
MLIS Defender of the Year	Sebastian Lopez	2025

=== Coaches ===
Competitions	Titles	Seasons
MLIS Coach of the Year	Johnny Williams	2025

== See also ==
- Toronto Shooting Stars – defunct indoor soccer club, member of the National Professional Soccer League
- Toronto ThunderHawks – defunct indoor soccer club, member of the National Professional Soccer League
- Mississauga MetroStars – defunct indoor soccer club, member of the Major Arena Soccer League
