= Travis MacKenzie =

American soccer player (born 1986)

Personal information
- Full name: Travis MacKenzie
- Date of birth: June 3, 1986 (age 40)
- Place of birth: Carnegie, Pennsylvania, United States
- Height: 5 ft 10 in (1.78 m)
- Position: Midfielder

College career
Years	Team	Apps	(Gls)
2004–2007	Duquesne Dukes	73	(21)

Senior career*
Years	Team	Apps	(Gls)
2008	Pittsburgh Riverhounds	19	(3)
2008–2010	Milwaukee Wave (indoor)	21	(7)
2010	Pittsburgh Riverhounds	17	(1)
- * Club domestic league appearances and goals as of August 25, 2010

Travis MacKenzie (born June 3, 1986, in Carnegie, Pennsylvania) is an American soccer player and associate head coach of the Chartiers Valley Colts soccer team who last played for Pittsburgh Riverhounds in the USL Second Division.

== Career ==
=== College and amateur ===
MacKenzie attended Chartiers Valley High School where amongst other awards he was an NSCAA All-American, a two-time Regional All-American, a three-time All-State selection, and the 2004 Almanac Athlete of the Year.

He subsequently played four years of college soccer at the Duquesne University, where he had an equally stellar career; he was a member of the Atlantic 10 All-Rookie Team and the Atlantic 10 Pre-Season All-Rookie Team as a freshman in 2004, was an NSCAA Mid-Atlantic All-Region Second Team and Atlantic 10 First Team All-Conference selection as a sophomore in 2005, was a member of the NSCAA Mid-Atlantic All-Region First, Atlantic 10 First Team All-Conference and Atlantic 10 Pre-Season All-Conference teams as a junior in 2005, and was on the Hermann Trophy Watch List prior to his senior season in 2007.

=== Professional ===
MacKenzie turned professional in 2008 when he signed for the Pittsburgh Riverhounds of the USL Second Division. He made his professional outdoor debut on April 19, 2008, in the team's 2008 season opener against the Cleveland City Stars, scored his first professional goal on June 7, 2008, in a 5–3 defeat to the Wilmington Hammerheads, and finished his freshman season with three goals in 19 games.

He subsequently played two seasons of pro indoor soccer with the Milwaukee Wave of the Major Indoor Soccer League in 2008-09 and 2009–10; in two seasons with the Wave he accumulated up 26 points in 21 games, including 7 goals, before returning to the Riverhounds in 2010.

== Coaching career ==
On November 7, 2025, Bridge City FC of Major League Indoor Soccer announced Travis MacKenzie as the club's first head coach.
