= Thomas Nevers =

American soccer player

Personal information
- Date of birth: June 8, 1956 (age 70)
- Place of birth: Middletown, Connecticut, U.S.
- Positions: Defender; forward

College career
Years	Team	Apps	(Gls)
1974–1977	UConn Huskies		

Senior career*
Years	Team	Apps	(Gls)
1978	Chicago Sting	3	(0)
1979–1980	Memphis Rogues	26	(0)
1979–1980	Memphis Rogues (indoor)	10	(1)
1980–1981	Hartford Hellions (indoor)	36	(11)
1981–1982	Memphis Americans (indoor)	35	(7)
- * Club domestic league appearances and goals

Thomas Nevers is an American retired soccer player who played professionally in the North American Soccer League and Major Indoor Soccer League.

== Youth ==
Nevers graduated from E. O. Smith High School in 1974 where he was a four sport letterman (soccer, baseball, golf and track). He led his high school team to the 1972 state championship and was an NSCAA High School All American. He is a member of the E.O. Smith High School Athletic Hall of Fame. He is also a member of the Connecticut Soccer Hall of Fame in 2007. He then attended the University of Connecticut where he played on the men's soccer team from 1974 to 1977.

== Professional ==
Nevers turned professional in 1978 with the Chicago Sting of the North American Soccer League. In 1979, he moved to the Memphis Rogues where he played two outdoor seasons. In the fall of 1979, he began his indoor career with the Memphis Rogues of the indoor North American Soccer League, where he scored one goal in 11 games for the league runners-up. After one season, he transferred to the Hartford Hellions before the team moved to Memphis, Tenn. and his finished his career with the relocated Memphis Americans during the 1981-1982 MISL season.
