= Helmut Dudek =

Polish-German footballer

Personal information
- Date of birth: 14 December 1957
- Place of birth: Bytom, Poland
- Date of death: 22 May 1994 (aged 36)
- Place of death: Leverkusen, Germany
- Height: 5 ft 11 in (1.80 m)
- Position: Defender

Senior career*
Years	Team	Apps	(Gls)
1978–1980	Borussia Mönchengladbach	6	(0)
1980-1981	Wichita Wings (indoor)	38	(22)
1981–1984	Memphis Americans (indoor)	133	(120)
1984–1985	Las Vegas Americans (indoor)	47	(25)
1985–1986	Pittsburgh Spirit (indoor)	45	(18)
1986–1987	Minnesota Strikers (indoor)	34	(11)
1987–1988	Baltimore Blast (indoor)	33	(8)
Total		336	(204)
- * Club domestic league appearances and goals

Helmut Dudek (14 December 1957 – 22 May 1994) was a Polish-German football defender who won the 1978–79 UEFA Cup with Borussia Mönchengladbach. He also played eight seasons in the Major Indoor Soccer League.

In 1978, Dudek, native of Poland who later became a West German citizen, signed with Borussia Mönchengladbach and was a member of the team as it won the 1978–79 UEFA Cup. He played a total of six games for Borussia before moving to the United States in 1980. That summer, he signed with the Wichita Wings of the Major Indoor Soccer League. The next year, he joined the Memphis Americans and played three seasons with the team in Memphis and another after the team moved west to Las Vegas, Nevada, where they became the Las Vegas Americans. In 1982, he was a First Team All Star. The Americans folded at the end of the 1984–85 season and the Pittsburgh Spirit hired Don Popovic, the American head coach. Popovic brought Dudek, and several other players, to the Spirit as free agents. Dudek spent he 1985–86 season in Pittsburgh. The team folded at the end of the season and Dudek signed with the Minnesota Strikers on 18 September 1986. After one season, the Strikers sent Dudek to the Baltimore Blast for future considerations. He spent one season in Baltimore, then left the league to return to Germany. He died on 22 May 1994 of cancer.

== Honors ==
- MISL All-Star Team: 1982
