= Mike Fall =

American soccer player

Personal information
- Date of birth: March 1, 1961 (age 65)
- Place of birth: Columbia, South Carolina, U.S.
- Positions: Forward; midfielder

Youth career
- 1978–1979: Bishop Moore High School

College career
Years	Team	Apps	(Gls)
1981–1982	Tampa Spartans		

Senior career*
Years	Team	Apps	(Gls)
1982–1984	Memphis Americans (indoor)	40	(4)
1983–1984	Jacksonville Tea Men		
1984–1986	Louisville Thunder (indoor)	76	(45)
1986	Orlando Lions		
1986–1987	Tampa Bay Rowdies (indoor)		
1987–1988	Tampa Bay Rowdies		
- * Club domestic league appearances and goals

Mike Fall is an American retired soccer player who played professionally in the Major Indoor Soccer League, American Indoor Soccer Association and American Soccer League.

== Youth ==
Fall graduated from Bishop Moore High School in Orlando, Florida where he was part of the school's state championship soccer team. He attended the University of Tampa, playing two years on the men's soccer team (1981–1982). In 1981, Tampa won the NCAA Division II Men's Soccer Championship.

== Professional ==
In 1983, the Tampa Bay Rowdies selected Fall in the North American Soccer League draft and he appeared in one indoor exhibition match for Tampa Bay. When the Rowdies did not sign him for the outdoor season, Fall joined the Jacksonville Tea Men of the American Soccer League. The Tea Men won the 1983 championship, with Fall scoring two goals. Fall spent the 1983-1984 indoor season with the Americans, then returned to the Tea Men, now playing in the United Soccer League, for the 1984 outdoor season. In the fall of 1984, Fall joined the Louisville Thunder of the American Indoor Soccer League. He spent two seasons with the Thunder. In 1985, Fall was the captain of the U.S. soccer team at the 1985 Summer Universiade. In 1986, Fall joined the independent Orlando Lions. In 1986, the Thunder traded Fall to the Rowdies in exchange for the rights to Pete Smith. In 1988, he played for the Rowdies in the American Soccer League.
