= Steve Doerr =

American soccer player

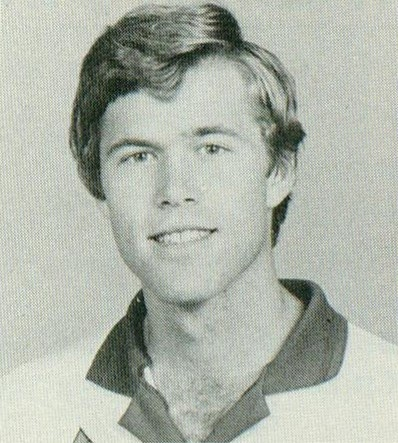
- Player picture for the Memphis Americans

Personal information
- Date of birth: July 7, 1959 (age 67)
- Place of birth: Phoenix, Arizona, U.S.
- Height: 6 ft 1 in (1.85 m)
- Position: Midfielder

Youth career
- 1977–1980: Indiana Hoosiers

Senior career*
Years	Team	Apps	(Gls)
1981–1984	Memphis Americans (indoor)	100	(17)
- * Club domestic league appearances and goals

Steve Doerr is an American retired soccer midfielder who played professionally for the Memphis Americans in the Major Indoor Soccer League.

Doerr attended Indiana University, playing on the men's soccer team from 1977 to 1980. In 1978 and 1980, the Hoosiers finished runner-up to the San Francisco Dons in the NCAA Division I Men's Soccer Championship. In 1981, Doerr turned professional with the Memphis Americans of the Major Indoor Soccer League. He played one hundred games for the Americans over three seasons before retiring in 1984.
