= Keith Tozer =

American soccer player (born 1957)

Personal information
- Date of birth: April 4, 1957 (age 69)
- Place of birth: Grosse Pointe, Michigan, United States
- Positions: Forward; defender

College career
Years	Team	Apps	(Gls)
1975–1978	Oneonta State Red Dragons		

Senior career*
Years	Team	Apps	(Gls)
1978–1979	Cincinnati Kids (indoor)	23	(4)
1979	Pennsylvania Stoners		
1979–1981	Hartford Hellions (indoor)	48	(9)
1981–1984	Pittsburgh Spirit (indoor)	85	(8)
1984–1987	Louisville Thunder (indoor)	83	(27)
1989–1990	Atlanta Attack (indoor)	17	(5)

Managerial career
- 1984–1987: Louisville Thunder
- 1987–1989: Los Angeles Lazers
- 1989–1992: Atlanta/Kansas City Attack
- 1992–2014: Milwaukee Wave
- 1996–1998: United States futsal (interim/assistant)
- 1998–?: United States futsal
- * Club domestic league appearances and goals

Keith Tozer is a retired American soccer player who played professionally in the Major Indoor Soccer League, American Soccer League and American Indoor Soccer Association. He is currently the commissioner of the Major Arena Soccer League.

== Player ==
=== College ===
Tozer grew up in upstate New York. After graduating from high school, he attended Oneonta State from 1975 to 1979, where he played as a forward on the men's soccer team. He finished his four seasons at Oneonta with the school's all-time points record of 117 points off 50 goals and 17 assists. In 2002, Oneonta State inducted Tozer into the school's Athletic Hall of Fame.

== Professional ==
In 1978, the Major Indoor Soccer League (MISL) was preparing for its first season. When they held their first college draft, the Cincinnati Kids selected Tozer as the league's first draft pick. He played a single season with the Kids, as the team folded at the end of the 1978–1979 season. When the Kids folded, Tozer moved outdoors to the Pennsylvania Stoners for the 1979 American Soccer League season. The Stoners made it to the league's playoff semifinals before being eliminated by the Columbus Magic. Tozer moved back to the MISL where he played for the Hartford Hellions for two seasons. At the end of the 1980–1981 season, Hartford moved to Memphis. Tozer did not move with the team, but joined the Pittsburgh Spirit. Tozer spent the next three seasons with the Spirit. While with the Spirit, Tozer spent time assisting with a summer soccer camp. That experience gave Tozer a taste for coaching which he would use in later years. In 1984, Tozer left both the Spirit and MISL when he moved to the Louisville Thunder of the American Indoor Soccer Association (AISA). The AISA was formed in March 1984 as a rival to MISL. Tozer played nearly 100 games with the Thunder over three seasons, but more significantly, he was the team's head coach. In his first two seasons with the Thunder, Tozer saw his team fall in the championship series to the Canton Invaders. In his third season with the team, Tozer and the Thunder finally mastered the Invaders, winning their first AISA championship. Tozer left the Thunder in 1987 to become the head coach of the Los Angeles Lazers (MISL), having coached the Thunder to a 70–37 record, three championship series and one AISA title.

== Coach ==
=== Professional ===
In 1987, Tozer became the head coach of the Lazers. Over the next two seasons, Tozer coached the team to a 62–70 record. In 1989 the Lazers folded and Tozer moved back to the AISA where he became a player/coach for the Atlanta Attack. He played only one season with the Attack, 1989–1990. At the end of the season, he retired from playing professionally, becoming a dedicated head coach for the Attack. He remained with the team when it moved to Kansas City in 1991 to become the National Professional Soccer League (NPSL) Kansas City Attack. When Tozer left the team at the end of the 1991–1992 season, he had led the team to a 74–46 record.

Tozer joined the Milwaukee Wave in 1992. In 1997–1998 he took the Wave to their first NPSL championship, and since then Tozer and the Wave won the NPSL title two more times, in 1999–2000 and 2000–2001. In 2001, the NPSL became the second incarnation of Major Indoor Soccer League. Tozer and the Wave continued their winning way, taking the MISL championship in 2004–2005.

Tozer guided the Wave again to a 15–5 record during the 2010–11 season tied with the Baltimore Blast for first place. The Wave beat the Missouri Comets in two games in the semi-finals and then beat the Baltimore Blast 16–7 in Baltimore for the Wave's fifth MISL Championship.

On January 29, 2012, Tozer recorded his 700th win as a coach in a 25–10 victory over the Syracuse Silver Knights. Tozer is currently the winningest professional indoor coach in North American indoor soccer history. On March 28, 2014, he parted ways on good terms as coach of the Milwaukee Wave.

=== Futsal ===
Tozer's success as a professional indoor coach has led to his selection as the interim U.S. Futsal team coach in 1996. He took the U.S. to the 1996 CONCACAF Futsal championship that year. Despite that success, he remained and interim/assistant coach until 1998 when he was hired as the team's head coach. That year he took the U.S. to third, its best finish ever, at the 1998 Futsal World Cup. In 2000, the U.S. took third at the CONCACAF championship before winning the tournament in 2004.

Since 1984 Tozer has become one of the most successful coaches in U.S. soccer history, and the all-time winningest coach in North America indoor soccer with over 700 wins, six league championships and eight coach of the year awards. He also owns a motivational company, Teamwork Concepts.

=== Executive ===
On June 3, 2021, Tozer was named commissioner of the Major Arena Soccer League. Shep Messing and JP Dellacamera also joined the league in other leadership roles.
