= Hank Liotart =

Dutch-American former soccer player (born 1943)

Personal information
- Full name: Henk Liotart
- Date of birth: November 15, 1943 (age 82)
- Place of birth: Baarn, Netherlands
- Height: 5 ft 11 in (1.80 m)
- Positions: Forward; midfielder

Senior career*
Years	Team	Apps	(Gls)
1964–1967	Blauw-Wit Amsterdam		(2)
1967	Pittsburgh Phantoms		
1968	Cleveland Stokers	31	(7)
1969	Dallas Tornado		
1970–1972	Zwolle		(20)
1972–1974	N.E.C.	7	(0)
1974–1976	Seattle Sounders	45	(2)
1976–1977	Portland Timbers	28	(2)
1979–1980	San Diego Sockers	12	(0)
1979–1980	Hartford Hellions (indoor)	26	(5)
1980–1981	Wichita Wings (indoor)	26	(1)
1981–1982	Memphis Americans (indoor)	39	(8)
1982	Bernadotte FF		

International career
1975	United States	4	(0)

Managerial career
- 1980: San Diego Sockers
- Hartford Hellions
- * Club domestic league appearances and goals

Hank Liotart (born November 15, 1943, in Baarn, Netherlands) is a Dutch-American former soccer player. Liotart played one season in the National Professional Soccer League, eight in the North American Soccer League and at least one in Major Indoor Soccer League. He also played eight years in the Netherlands. Liotart earned four caps with the U.S. national team in 1975.

== Professional ==
In 1964, Liotart signed with Blauw-Wit Amsterdam and spent three seasons in the Netherlands before moving to the U.S. When Liotart arrived in the U.S., he signed with the Pittsburgh Phantoms of the National Professional Soccer League (NPSL). The Phantoms folded at the end of the season and the NPSL merged with the United Soccer Association in 1968 to form the North American Soccer League (NASL). Liotart moved to the Cleveland Stokers for the 1968 NASL season. The Stokers folded at the end of the season and Liotart moved again, this time to the Dallas Tornado for the 1969 season. In 1970, he moved back to the Netherlands to sign with PEC Zwolle. In 1972, Zwolle transferred Liotart to N.E.C. Liotart left Nijmegen and returned to the U.S. in 1974. That year, the Seattle Sounders were an expansion team in the NASL. The team's coach John Best had played with Liotart in both Cleveland and Dallas and recruited him into the team. Liotart was a second team NASL All Star in 1974. He remained with the Sounders until 1976 when the team traded him to the Portland Timbers ten games into the season. That year, Liotart was invited to play for the U.S., actually an NASL all star team, in the Bicentennial Cup. In 1977, he played with Portland, then left the league for a season. In 1979, he signed with the San Diego Sockers for the 1979 and 1980 seasons. Liotart then played at least one season with the Memphis Americans of the Major Indoor Soccer League (MISL). In 1982, he played for the Oklahoma City Slickers in the American Soccer League.

== National team ==
Liotart earned four caps with the U.S. national team. His first game came in a 4–0 loss to Poland on June 24, 1975. He started, then came off for Dave D'Errico in the 67th minute. In August, the U.S. was invited to the Mexico City Tournament. Liotart played all three games in the tournament. His last cap came in the third game, a 2–0 loss to Mexico on August 24, 1975. He again started the game, but came off for Poli Garcia in the 71st minute.

== Coaching ==
In 1980, Liotart coached the San Diego Sockers in the NASL. He then coached the Hartford Hellions of MISL at some time in his career to a 3–9 record.
