= Art Hughes (American soccer) =

American soccer player

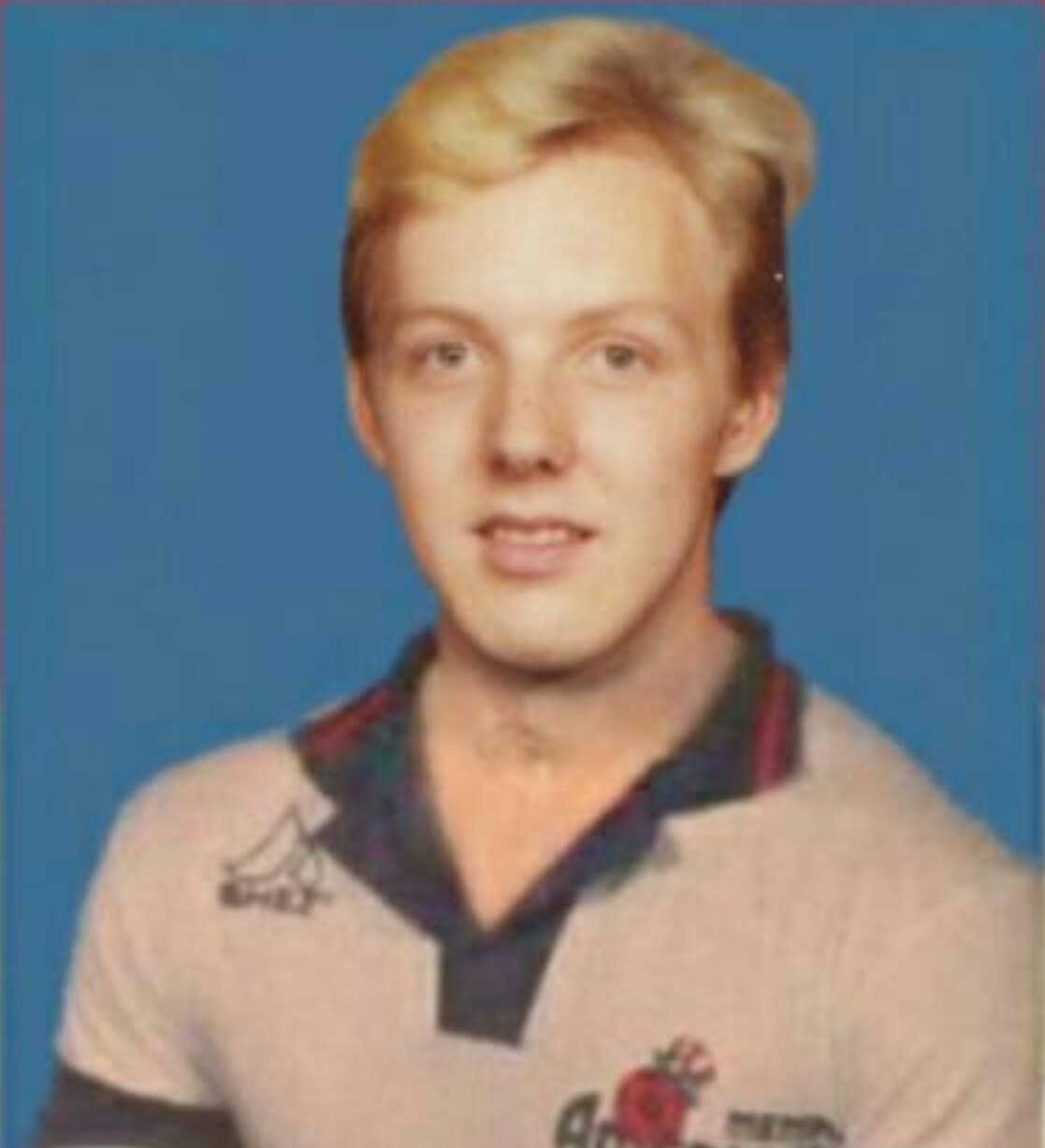

Personal information
- Full name: Arthur Hughes
- Date of birth: July 17, 1965 (age 61)
- Place of birth: Memphis, Tennessee, U.S.
- Height: 6 ft 1 in (1.85 m)
- Position: Defender

Youth career
- 1979–1982: Memphis Central

Senior career*
Years	Team	Apps	(Gls)
1982–1984	Memphis Americans	50	(13)
1984–1987	Louisville Thunder	101	(49)
1987–90	Memphis Storm	55	(18)
1990–91	Memphis Rogues (SISL)	10	(2)
- * Club domestic league appearances and goals

Art Hughes is an American retired professional soccer defender who played in the 1980s in the original Major Indoor Soccer League, the American Indoor Soccer Association, and the SISL currently the United Soccer League.

Hughes attended Memphis Central, playing on the men's soccer team from 1979 to 1982. In 1981 Hughes was selected to the Tennessee All-State team, and would turn professional in the fall of 1982 with the Memphis Americans of the Major Indoor Soccer League.

At the end of the 1984 season he signed with the Louisville Thunder of the AISA playing three seasons and helping the team win the league championship in 1986–87. The 1987–88 season found Hughes returning to Memphis playing with the Memphis Storm also of the AISA for three seasons until the end of the 1989–90 season.

For the 1989–90 season the Memphis Storm was sold and the new owners changed the team name to the Memphis Rogues which was the name of the cities North American Soccer League team from the late 1970s. The team switched leagues and joined the Sunbelt Independent Soccer League for the 1990–91 season.

Hughes played with the team until an auto accident ended his career in 1991.

During his career, Hughes was coached and mentored by several notable figures in soccer, including 1974 West German World Cup champion Bernd Holzenbein, U.S. National Soccer Hall of Famer Kyle Rote Jr, and current U.S. national futsal team coach Keith Tozer.

Beyond his 1987 AISA Championship and 4 time All-Star team picks in both the MISL and AISA Hughes is probably most remembered for what he did in 1989 off the soccer pitch. In December 1988 while playing with the Memphis Storm of the American Indoor Soccer Association word came of a huge cyclone that had just devastated Bangladesh. Having recently lost a childhood school mate Hughes decided to donated his entire seasons salary to help rebuild a school in the West Bengal Narayanganjri region most ravaged by the storm.

== Yearly awards ==
- MISL All-Star Team - 1984
- AISA All-Star Team - 1985, 1986, 1988
