= Bishop Moore Catholic High School =

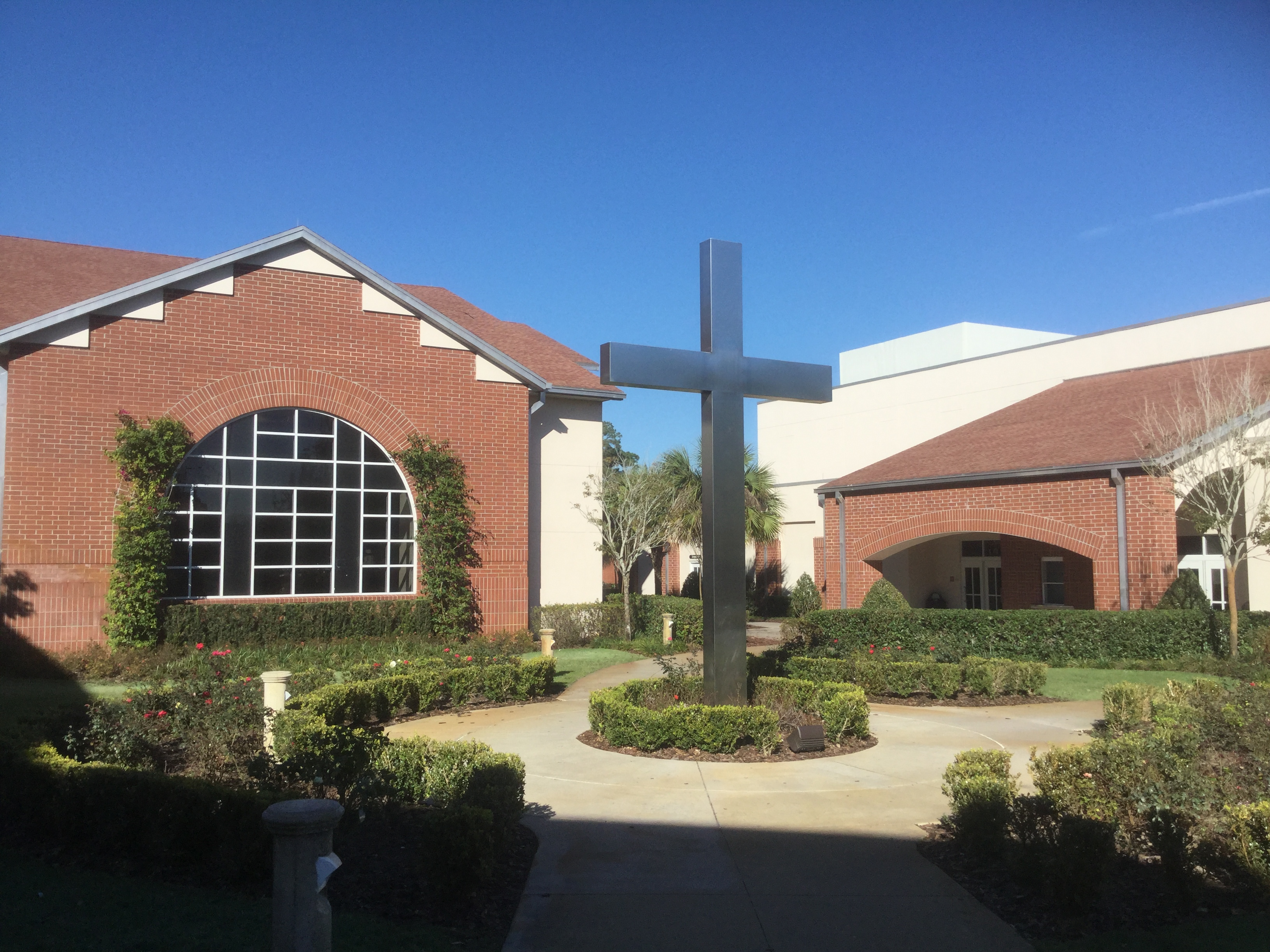
- Central part of the campus, January 2017

Location
- 3901 Edgewater Drive; Orlando, (Orange County), Florida 32804; United States
- 28.5877°N 81.3913°W

Information
- Type: Private, coeducational
- Motto: Virtus et Scientia (Virtue and Knowledge)
- Religious affiliation: Catholic
- Established: 1954; 72 years ago
- Founder: Monsignor Bartok and the Sisters of St. Joseph
- Authority: Diocese of Orlando
- Superintendent: Erika Wikstrom
- President: Thomas Doyle
- Principal: Nick Pavgouzas
- Grades: 9–12
- Campus size: 50 acres (20 ha)
- Campus type: Urban (Large city)
- Colors: Black and gold
- Mascot: Hornet
- Accreditation: Southern Association of Colleges and Schools
- Yearbook: Moore Memories
- Tuition: $14,172 - Catholic; $19,572 - non Catholic
- Website: www.bishopmoore.org

Bishop Moore Catholic High School is a private Catholic high school in the College Park neighborhood of Orlando, Florida in the United States. The school is located within the Diocese of Orlando and remains the only Catholic high school in Greater Orlando. The enrollment capacity is approximately 1,500 students.

== Description ==
The school was built in 1954 and was named after Bishop John Moore; he was the second bishop of the Diocese of St. Augustine, which had been the only diocese in Florida prior to the creation of the Archdiocese of Miami (1958).

John Moore was born in County Westmeath, Ireland, and moved to Charleston, South Carolina at the age of 14. He served as Bishop of St. Augustine from 1877 to 1901. Moore was influential in the expansion of Catholic schools in Florida and in the recruitment of religious nuns and priests to meet the ministerial needs of the diocese.

The school sits on a 50-acre (20 ha) campus adjacent to Little Lake Fairview. There are multiple campus buildings. An extensive renovation and expansion occurred in 2002 with the addition of a new gymnasium complex, administrative building, library complex, band room, and classroom space. Loretta Hall and the Massaro Science Wing were restored. The landmark "Golden Dome" remains in use as a secondary gymnasium and was recently renovated to include extra classrooms and a space for theater productions. Most of the buildings are original to the campus, with new additions being to the science labs in summer 2011. In the summer of 2016, the media center and Mary Martha Hall were renovated to add a new student cafe and additional classrooms. In May 2021, the new Moore Center for Excellence, a multi-purpose athletic and academic facility, was dedicated and opened.

== Notable alumni ==
- Jen Kiggans, US House of Representatives
- Jennifer Arnold, featured on The Little Couple
- Jenn Brown, ESPN sportscaster
- Drew Butera, Retired MLB player (Twins, Dodgers, Angels, Royals, Rockies), Current MLB coach (Angels)
- Hunter Cattoor, basketball player
- Manny Coto, TV and film writer and producer
- Mike Fall, former professional soccer player
- Mel Martinez, former U.S. Senator
- Michael Mainelli, 695th Lord Mayor of the City of London
- Michael McClendon, former MLB player (Milwaukee Brewers)
- Mandy Moore, singer and actress
- Tim Geltz, former professional soccer player
- Emily Piriz, featured on American Idol
- Tony Renna, former IndyCar driver
- Bob Spitulski, former NFL player
- Aaron Sagers, television presenter
