= Mike Barbarick =

American soccer player (born 1959)

Personal information
- Birth name: Michael Barbarick
- Date of birth: August 1, 1959 (age 67)
- Place of birth: Darby, Pennsylvania, U.S.
- Height: 6 ft 2 in (1.88 m)
- Position: Goalkeeper

Youth career
- 1977–1979: Washington Huskies

Senior career*
Years	Team	Apps	(Gls)
1981–1982	Seattle Sounders (indoor)	1	(0)
1982	Seattle Sounders	0	(0)
1982	San Diego Sockers	3	(0)
1983	Pennsylvania Stoners	16	(0)
1984	Houston Dynamos	24	(0)
1984–1985	Canton Invaders (indoor)	28	(0)
- * Club domestic league appearances and goals

Mike Barbarick (born 1 August 1959) is an American retired soccer goalkeeper who played professionally in the North American Soccer League, American Soccer League, United Soccer League and American Indoor Soccer Association.

Barbarick attended the University of Washington, playing on the men's soccer team from 1977 to 1980. In 1981, he signed with the Seattle Sounders of the North American Soccer League and played one game during the 1981-1982 NASL indoor season and was voted second star of the game. He began the 1982 outdoor season with the Sounders before being traded to the San Diego Sockers during the season. He was nominated by Ron Neuman for NASL Rookie of the Year in 1982. In 1983, he played for the Pennsylvania Stoners of the American Soccer League. In 1984, he played for the Houston Dynamos of the United Soccer League. He led the American Indoor Soccer Association with the lowest goals against average and greatest number of victories during the 1984–1985 season.
