= National Indoor Soccer League =

Former Indoor Soccer League

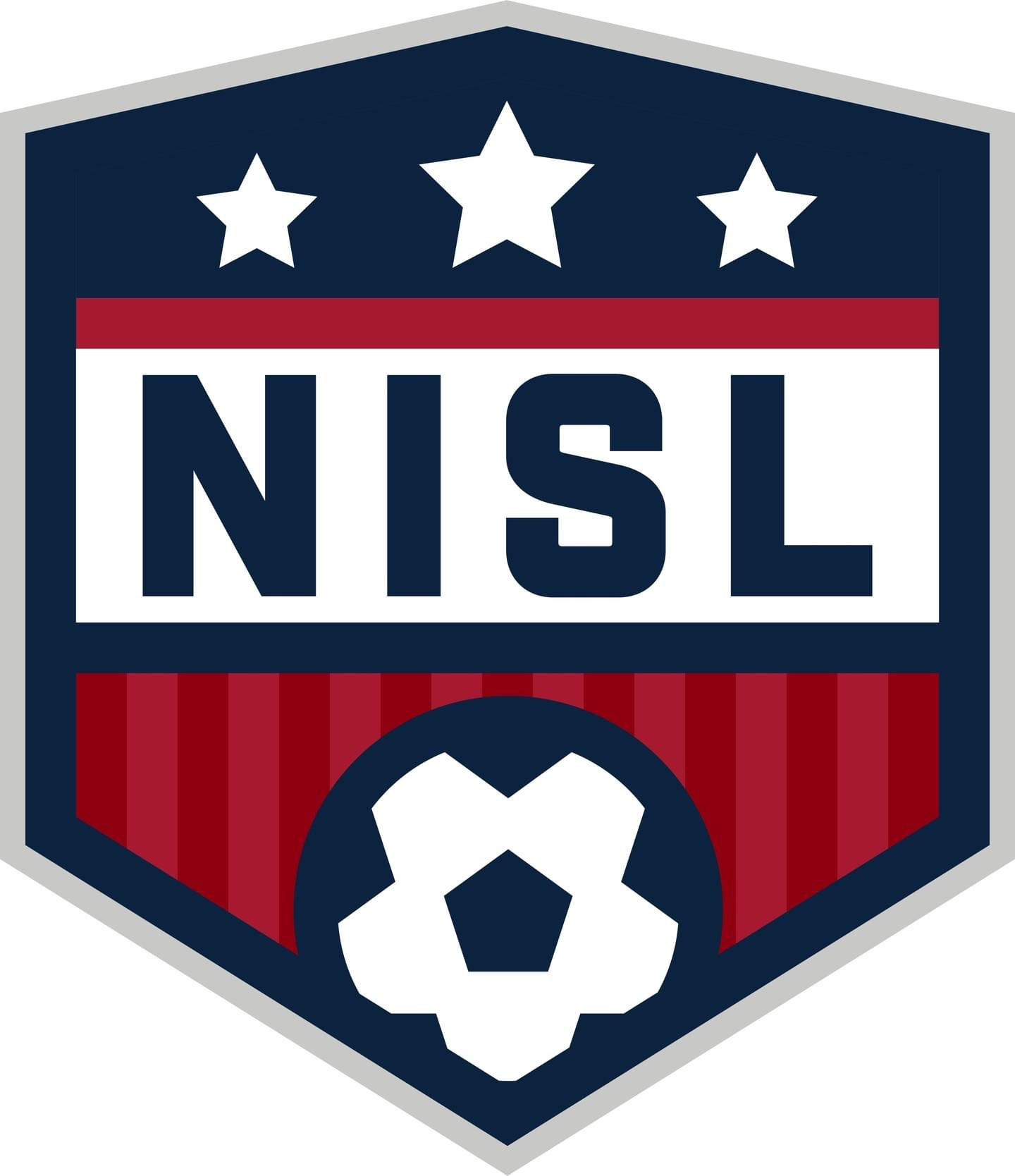
- Founded: January 2021
- Folded: March 2024; 2 years ago
- Country: United States
- Number of clubs: 5
- Last champions: Fayetteville Fury (Men); Memphis Americans (Women)
- Most championships: Fayetteville Fury (Men) (1 title); Memphis Americans (Women) (1 title)

The National Indoor Soccer League (NISL) was an indoor soccer league plagued with internal controversy that began play in 2021 and was based in the Southeast United States. The league fielded men's and women's divisions. On March 24, 2021, the league announced its partnership with Nike yet internal sources state that the partnership never materialized based on the business practices of the NISL management and ownership. On March 29, 2024, the league announced a merger with Major League Indoor Soccer.

== History ==
On April 29, 2021, the Memphis Americans were officially announced as a charter team in the new NISL On June 7. 2021, the Fayetteville Fury were announced as the league's second team. On August 17, 2021, the Columbus Rapids became the third franchise to join the league. On December 16, 2021, 10 days before the season opener, the Rome (Ga.) Gladiators, a travel team, became the fourth and final team to join the league for its inaugural season.

On July 7, 2022, it was announced that an expansion team was coming to Tampa.

On November 16, 2023, after a fight between the players and coaches of the Memphis Americans and Tampa Bay Strikers, the Memphis Americans went on hiatus.

After endless controversy related to player and staff wages, safety, sponsorship fulfillment, and general business practices on the part of the league and its owner/director Andrew Haines, on March 29, 2024, the league announced its merger with Major League Indoor Soccer with many staff and players never receiving their wages in full.

== Staff ==
- Andrew Haines – Executive Board of Directors
- Joshua Blair – Executive Board of Directors
- Jason Gibson – Executive Board of Directors
- Michael Taylor – Executive Board of Directors
- Donald Bunney – Creative Director

== Teams ==
=== Final season ===
Team	City/Area	Arena	Capacity	Men's Coach	Women's Coach	Founded
Albany Aces	Albany, Georgia	Albany Civic Center	7,200		TBA	2023
Central Florida Crusaders	Orlando, Florida	Addition Financial Arena	9,400	Tom Traxler	Tom Traxler	2022
Fayetteville Fury	Fayetteville, North Carolina	Crown Coliseum	10,000	Jay Burbee	Jay Burbee	2021
Magic City SC	Pelham, Alabama	Pelham Civic Center	4,100	Jennifer Pfieffer	TBA	2023
Tampa Bay Strikers	Tampa, Florida	Yuengling Center	10,411	Martín Gramática	Martín Gramática	2022

=== Former ===
Team	City/Area	Arena	Capacity	Founded	Went Inactive
Rome Gladiators	Rome, Georgia	N/A	N/A	2021	2022
Columbus Rapids	Columbus, Georgia	Columbus Civic Center	7,573	2021	2023
Memphis Americans	Southaven, Mississippi	Landers Center	8,500	2021	2023

== Champions ==
Men's Champions
Year	Champion	Runner-up	Final Score	Location
2021–2022	Fayetteville Fury	Memphis Americans	5–3	Crown Coliseum
2022–2023	Central Florida Crusaders			Playoffs cancelled; championship awarded based on regular-season standings.
2024	cancelled			

Women's Champions
Year	Champion	Runner-up	Final Score	Location
2021–2022	Memphis Americans	Rome Gladiators	5–3	Crown Coliseum
2022–2023	Memphis Americans			Awarded Championship
2024	cancelled			
