= Landers Center =

Arena in Mississippi, United States

Coordinates: 34.927124°N 89.9969°W

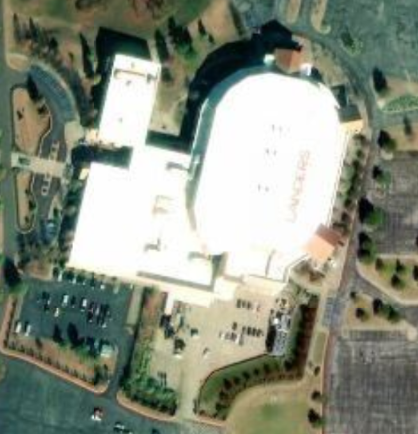

- Location within Mississippi Location within the United States
- Former names: DeSoto Civic Center (2000–2011)
- Address: 4560 Venture Drive
- Location: Southaven, Mississippi
- Owner: DeSoto County
- Operator: DeSoto County Convention & Visitors Bureau
- Capacity: In-the-Round: 10,045; End-Stage 180: 7,888; Boxing/wrestling: 10,000; Basketball: 9,000; Football, hockey, ice show, rodeo/circus: 8,500
- Field size: Maximum Floor Dimensions: 250’ L x 140’ W Maximum Floor Area: 35,000 sq. ft. Ice Floor Dimensions: 200’ L x 85’ W

Construction
- Groundbreaking: April 24, 1998
- Opened: September 16, 2000
- Cost: $35 million ($65.4 million in 2025 dollars)
- Architect: Johnson Bailey Henderson McNeel Architects
- General contractor: Carothers Construction Inc.

Tenants
- Memphis RiverKings (CHL) (2000–2007); Memphis Xplorers (AF2) (2001–2006); Memphis Hustle (NBAGL) (2017–present); Memphis Americans (NISL) (2021–2023); Mid-South Monarchs (FPHL) (2026–present); Mississippi Wolfpack (AAL) (2027–present)

Website
- http://landerscenter.com/

The Landers Center is an 8,400-seat multi-purpose arena in Southaven, Mississippi. It is home to the Memphis Hustle of the NBA G League, a minor league basketball team affiliated with the Memphis Grizzlies.

== History ==
The center was built in 2000. On January 4, 2012, Memphis-based Landers Auto Group purchased the naming rights. The name was changed to the Landers Center. Several now-defunct teams have called the arena home. These teams include the Memphis Xplorers of the AF2, the Mississippi RiverKings (previously called the Memphis RiverKings) of the Central Hockey League and Southern Professional Hockey League, and the Memphis Americans of the National Indoor Soccer League. Currently, it is home to the Memphis Hustle of the NBA G League.

The center houses a 17,000 square foot convention center and 400 seat performing arts center. It is used as a concert venue, boxing arena, and for ice shows and circuses. Since 2009, the Mid-South Fair has been held at the Landers Center. Formerly, the fair was held in midtown Memphis at the Fairgrounds.

During the 2021–22 NBA G League season, the Landers Center served as one of the temporary home arenas for the Capitanes de la Ciudad de México during their inaugural season at the NBA G League despite also being temporarily stationed at Fort Worth, Texas at the time due to the long-term effects of the COVID-19 pandemic.

In March 2026, an expansion team in the Federal Prospects Hockey League was announced to begin play at the Landers Center for the 2026–2027 season.
