= Jim Gabarra =

American soccer player and coach

Personal information
- Full name: James Michael Gabarra
- Date of birth: September 22, 1959 (age 67)
- Place of birth: Key West, Florida, United States
- Height: 5 ft 11 in (1.80 m)
- Position: Forward

College career
Years	Team	Apps	(Gls)
1978–1981	Connecticut Camels		

Senior career*
Years	Team	Apps	(Gls)
1982–1983	Detroit Express		
1984	New York Nationals		
1984–1985	Louisville Thunder (indoor)	30	(45)
1985	Dallas Sidekicks (indoor)	10	(0)
1985–1987	Louisville Thunder (indoor)	67	(33)
1987–1989	Los Angeles Lazers (indoor)	87	(38)
1989–1990	Los Angeles Heat		
1989–1991	San Diego Sockers (indoor)	93	(29)
1991–1992	Tacoma Stars (indoor)	36	(20)
1992–1993	Milwaukee Wave (indoor)	33	(28)
1993	Los Angeles United (indoor)	28	(14)
1996	Washington Warthogs (indoor)	27	(13)

International career
1988–1989	United States	14	(0)

Managerial career
- 1982–1983: Louisville Thunder
- 1985–1987: Milwaukee Wave
- 1994–1997: Washington Warthogs
- 1994–1998: Naval Academy (assistant)
- 2001–2010: Washington Freedom
- 2004: San Diego Spirit
- 2011: Sky Blue FC
- 2012: New Jersey Wildcats
- 2013–2015: Sky Blue FC
- 2016–2018: Washington Spirit
- * Club domestic league appearances and goals

James Michael Gabarra (born September 22, 1959) is an American retired soccer forward who coached the Washington Spirit National Women's Soccer League team, and previously coached Sky Blue FC and the Washington Freedom women's soccer teams. He played professionally in the American Soccer League, United Soccer League, American Indoor Soccer Association, Major Indoor Soccer League and Western Soccer Alliance.

== Early career ==
A native of Key West, Florida, Gabarra attended Connecticut College where he played soccer from 1978 to 1981. In 1989, Connecticut College inducted Gabarra into its Athletic Hall of Fame. After finishing college in the spring of 1982, Gabarra was signed by the Detroit Express of the American Soccer League (ASL). The Express won the ASL championship that season, defeating the Oklahoma City Slickers two games to one to take the title. However, both the Express and the ASL barely made it through the 1983 season before they both folded. Gabarra spent most of his time with the Express on the substitute's bench.

In 1984, the United Soccer League (USL) attempted to replace the ASL as the de facto U.S. second division. Gabarra moved to the USL where he joined the New York Nationals. The USL fared little better than the ASL, and the Nationals folded at the end of the season. The league itself collapsed during its second season, but by that time Gabarra was establishing himself as an indoor star.

== Indoor soccer ==
In 1984, the Louisville Thunder of the newly established American Indoor Soccer Association (AISA) signed Gabarra. With the move to indoor soccer, Gabarra found his niche. That year he led the Thunder in scoring as the team went to the AISA championship series, only to lose to the Canton Invaders. On September 18, 1985, during the AISA off season, Gabarra signed with the Dallas Sidekicks of Major Indoor Soccer League (MISL) as a free agent. He played ten games with the team, assisting on one goal, before moving back to the Louisville Thunder. In 1986, Gabarra and the Thunder finally overcame the Invaders and took the 1985–1986 AISA title. The next season, he moved to the Los Angeles Lazers of MISL. He stayed with the Lazers for three seasons. However, the team folded at the end of the 1988–1989 season. Gabarra then moved to the San Diego Sockers where he was a part of the 1990–1991 championship team. He moved once more, this time to the Tacoma Stars for the 1991–1992 season.

By the 1991–1992 season, the MISL was on its last legs. At the end of the season, the league and the Stars folded. He then moved to the Milwaukee Wave of the National Professional Soccer League.

During that time, Gabarra also played two outdoor seasons with the Los Angeles Heat. In 1989, the Heat were members of the Western Soccer League (WSL). That year, they lost in penalty kicks to the San Francisco Bay Blackhawks in the semifinals. At the end of the 1989 season, the WSL merged with the American Soccer League to form the American Professional Soccer League (APSL). The Heat continued its excellent play in 1990, making it to the Western Conference championship series, where it fell again to the Blackhawks.

== Olympics, futsal and national team ==
In 1986, Gabarra began playing for the U.S. Olympic soccer team as it began the qualification process for the 1988 Summer Olympics to be held in Seoul, South Korea. The U.S. qualified, and Gabarra was part of the team which went 1–1–1 and failed to reach the second round.

Gabarra used his extensive indoor soccer experience to contribute to the U.S. Futsal team. He was the captain of the team from 1986 to 1996, during which he earned 30 indoor caps and scored 17 goals, both U.S. records. In 1989, the U.S. Futsal FIFA Futsal World Championship. Three years later, Gabarra and his teammates took second at the Futsal championship, losing 4–1 to Brazil in the championship game.

Gabarra earned his first cap with the U.S. national team in a May 14, 1988 loss to Colombia. He went on to earn a total of 14 caps in 1988 and 1989. During 1989, he usually came on as a substitute. His last match with the national team came on November 5, 1989, in a scoreless tie with El Salvador.

== Coaching ==
Gabarra began his transition from playing to coaching early in his career when he became the player/coach of the Louisville Thunder in 1985. He lasted two seasons as the head coach. After he retired from playing with the collapse of the Tacoma Stars and the MISL, he returned to coaching with the Milwaukee Wave. He lasted only the 1992–1993 season. In 1994, he became the head coach of the Washington Warthogs of the Continental Indoor Soccer League (CISL) and remained with the team through the 1997 season when the league folded. He also served as a volunteer assistant coach to his wife who is the women's soccer coach at the U.S. Naval Academy.

On August 11, 2000, the Washington Freedom of the Women's United Soccer Association announced it had hired Gabarra as its first head coach. The WUSA was a new league which did not begin competitive play until the 2001 season. That year the Freedom stumbled badly, finishing second to the bottom in the standings and placing no players on the All Star team. In 2002, the Freedom made a complete turnaround and reached the WUSA championship, only to fall 3–2 to the Carolina Courage.

In 2003, Gabarra led the Freedom to a second consecutive WUSA championship game. This time it won, defeating the Atlanta Beat 2–1 in overtime. That was the last year for the WUSA, as it folded due to financial difficulties. When the WUSA folded, the Freedom recreated itself as an independent soccer club, the Freedom Soccer Club. Gabarra remained on as its head coach despite briefly coaching the San Diego Spirit during a tournament in 2004. In 2007, Gabarra coached the Freedom's W-League franchise to the W-League championship and was one of three finalists for W-League Coach of the Year.

When the Freedom returned to professional soccer in 2009 as part of the new Women's Professional Soccer league, Gabarra continued as head coach. The team made the playoffs both that year and in 2010; however, the team suffered a 10-game winless streak in the latter. After losing the first-round playoff game (as happened in 2009 as well), Gabarra resigned, citing "irreconcilable differences" with team management.

Gabarra signed with Sky Blue FC in 2011. After the WPS folded, Gabarra coached the New Jersey Wildcats of the W-League for the 2012 season. Gabarra returned to coach Sky Blue FC in 2013 as part of the National Women's Soccer League, where he led the team to the playoffs in their first year in the new league but did not return under his tenure. He left in October 2015 to become the general manager and head coach of the Washington Spirit

In his first year in those roles with the Spirit, the team hosted a home playoff match, won a playoff game, and advanced to the NWSL Championship for the first times in club history. The Spirit drew the Western New York Flash in regulation and extra periods before losing 4–3 in penalty kicks.

== Personal life ==
Gabarra is husband of the former women's soccer player Carin Jennings-Gabarra, and the father of the soccer player Tyler Gabarra. Gabarra is of Polish descent with roots in Wisła.
