= Bridge City FC =

American professional indoor soccer club based in Pittsburgh

- Full name: Bridge City Football Club
- Founded: May 23, 2025; 17 months ago
- Stadium: Sewickley Sports Arena; Sewickley, Pennsylvania
- Capacity: 2,000
- Owner(s): Grant Glorioso; Jack Shearer; Josh DiMatteo
- Head coach: Travis MacKenzie
- League: Major League Indoor Soccer
- Website: bridgecityfc.soccershift.com

Bridge City FC is an indoor soccer team based in Sewickley, Pennsylvania, within the Pittsburgh metropolitan area. The team plays in Major League Indoor Soccer and began play in 2025.

== History ==
=== Founding ===
Bridge City FC was announced as an MLIS expansion team in May 2025, under the ownership of Pittsburgh natives and former Major Arena Soccer League players Jack Shearer, Josh DiMatteo, and Grant Glorioso. Its name is an allusion to one of Pittsburgh's nicknames, "The City of Bridges". The team is the first indoor soccer team located in the Pittsburgh area since the short-lived Pittsburgh Stingers folded three decades earlier. On November 7, 2025, Bridge City announced former Pittsburgh Riverhounds' player Travis MacKenzie as the club's first head coach. On November 11, 2026, Bridge City announced former Chartiers Valley School District and University of Pitt player, Eric Prex as the club's next head coach succeeding Travis Mackenzie.

=== Inaugural Season ===
Prior to the start of the 2025–26 season, MLIS announced that the league would be split into two conferences, with Bridge City FC being placed in the North Conference. Bridge City FC defeated Summit City Sentinels 9–8 in their first ever match on November 22, 2025. Bridge City FC made their home debut on December 13, 2025, a 6-2 victory over Red Cedar FC in front of a sold-out crowd at Sewickley Sports Arena. Bridge City finished their inaugural season with a 7-5 record, third in the North Conference but failing to qualify for the postseason. Owner/goalkeeper Grant Glorioso led the league in saves (212) and save percentage (.765), and tied for third most wins in the league (7). Glorioso and Jack Shearer would be named to the MLIS All-League Second Team, with Josh DiMatteo selected to the Third Team.

== Year-by-Year ==
Year	League	Pld	Record	GF	GA	GD	Position	Playoffs	Avg. Attendance
2025-26	MLIS	12	7-5	97	81	+16	3rd, North	Did Not Qualify	2,000

== Arena ==
Bridge City FC plays their home games in Sewickley Sports Arena, a 2,000-seat arena in Sewickley. The arena once served as the home of the Pittsburgh Spirit, the city's first indoor soccer team.

== Club crest and colors ==
Bridge City FC wears the traditional Pittsburgh sports colors of black and gold. The club's crest is a shield featuring one of the city's iconic bridges with Pittsburgh's 412 area code above the team's name and the year of the club's founding.

== See also ==
- Pittsburgh Spirit- defunct indoor soccer club, member of the Major Indoor Soccer League
- Pittsburgh Riverhounds SC- professional soccer club in USL Championship
- Steel City FC- pre-professional soccer club with teams in USL League Two and USL W League
