= Major Indoor Soccer League =

Major Indoor Soccer League has been the name of three different American professional indoor soccer leagues:

- Major Indoor Soccer League (1978–1992), known in its final two seasons as the Major Soccer League
- Major Indoor Soccer League (2001–2008), founded by former NPSL teams and later joined by WISL teams
- Major Indoor Soccer League (2008–2014), known as the National Indoor Soccer League in 2008 and adopted the MISL name in 2009
