= Louisville Thunder =

Indoor soccer club in Louisville, Kentucky

Louisville Thunder was an indoor soccer club based in Louisville, Kentucky. The team played in the American Indoor Soccer Association

== Stadium ==
From the club's inaugural season in 1984 to 1987, home games were played in Broadbent Arena. It is a multi-purpose arena that also served the Louisville RiverFrogs and Louisville IceHawks of the ECHL. It has a 6,600 seat capacity

== Team records ==
=== Year-by-year ===
| Year | Division | League | Reg. season | Playoffs | Avg. attendance |
|---|---|---|---|---|---|
| 1984–85 | 2 | AISA | 3rd | Final | 1,915 |
| 1985–86 | 2 | AISA | 2nd | Final | 2,843 |
| 1986–87 | 2 | AISA | 1st, Southern | Champions | 2,187 |

=== Appearances ===
As of November 21, 2023

| # | Name | Career | AISA | Playoffs | Total |
|---|---|---|---|---|---|
| 1 | (United States) Chris Hellenkamp | 1985-87 | 120 | 20 | 140 |
| 2 | (Iran) Saeed Bakhtiari | 1985-87 | 103 | 19 | 122 |
| 3 | (United States) Jim Gabarra | 1985, 1986–87 | 97 | 20 | 117 |
| 4 | (United States) Mike Fall | 1985–87 | 78 | 20 | 98 |
| 5 | (United States) Keith Tozer | 1985–87 | 83 | 12 | 95 |

| # | Name | Career | USL | Playoffs | Open Cup | Total |
|---|---|---|---|---|---|---|
| 1 | (England) Cameron Lancaster | 2015–18, 2020– | 69 | 5 | 5 | 79 |
| 2 | (United States) Brian Ownby | 2017– | 20 | 7 | 3 | 30 |
| 3 | (Denmark) Magnus Rasmussen | 2015–16, 2018–19 | 25 | 4 | 0 | 29 |
| 3 | (United States) Luke Spencer | 2017–20 | 23 | 5 | 1 | 29 |
| 5 | (United States) George Davis IV | 2016–21 | 23 | 1 | 1 | 25 |

=== Assists ===
As of November 8, 2022

| # | Name | Career | USL | Playoffs | Open Cup | Total |
|---|---|---|---|---|---|---|
| 1 | (United States) Oscar Jimenez | 2016– | 27 | 5 | 4 | 36 |
| 2 | (United States) Brian Ownby | 2017– | 28 | 3 | 1 | 32 |
| 3 | (Republic of Ireland) Niall McCabe | 2015– | 26 | 3 | 2 | 31 |
| 4 | (United States) Paolo DelPiccolo | 2016– | 17 | 1 | 1 | 19 |
| 5 | (Serbia) Ilija Ilic | 2015–18 | 14 | 0 | 2 | 16 |

== Coaches ==
- (United States) Keith Tozer (1984–87)

== League honors ==
- AISA Goalkeeper of the Year
  - Rick Schweizer : 1985
- AISA All-Star Team
  - Rick Schweizer : 1985
  - Art Hughes : 1985
  - Zoran Savic : 1986, 1987
  - Art Hughes : 1986, 1987
  - Chris Hellenkamp : 1987
- Regular Season Points Leader
  - Zoran Savic : 1986

== See also ==
- Sports in Louisville, Kentucky
