= Kyle Rote Jr. =

American soccer player-coach

Kyle Rote
Personal information
- Full name: William Kyle Rote Jr.
- Date of birth: December 25, 1950 (age 75)
- Place of birth: Dallas, Texas, United States
- Height: 6 ft 0 in (1.83 m)
- Position: Forward

College career
Years	Team	Apps	(Gls)
1969–1972	Sewanee Tigers		

Senior career*
Years	Team	Apps	(Gls)
1972–1978	Dallas Tornado	121	(42)
1979	Houston Hurricane	21	(1)

International career
1973–1975	United States	5	(0)

Managerial career
- 1983–1984: Memphis Americans
- * Club domestic league appearances and goals

William Kyle Rote Jr. (born December 25, 1950) is an American former professional soccer forward who played seven seasons in the North American Soccer League (NASL) and earned five caps with the United States men's national soccer team between 1973 and 1975. He led the NASL in scoring in 1973. He later coached the Memphis Americans of the Major Indoor Soccer League (MISL). He is a member of the National Soccer Hall of Fame.

== Family background ==
Rote Jr. is the son of Kyle Rote, an all-American college football player at Southern Methodist University who also played in the National Football League as wide receiver for the New York Giants. In fact, Rote Jr. remembers his father's positive reaction when he (Rote Jr.) changed sports in college, remembering his father as saying, “If that’s what you want to do, I’m going to support you in that. Don’t feel like you need to follow in my footsteps. You make your own footsteps.”

Rote Jr. says of his father, “He really freed me up.”

Rote Jr.’s cousin-once-removed Tobin Rote played in the NFL, quarterbacking for four different teams.

== Youth ==
While in high school, Rote Jr. helped to start the Black Bandits in the Dallas youth soccer league. One of his goals of playing soccer was to stay in shape during the off-season to American tackle football. And in fact, he received the “All-Texas” honor for both quarterback and defensive back in tackle football. Rote Jr. graduated from Highland Park High School in Dallas, Texas, in 1968.

He attended Oklahoma State University initially intending to concentrate on American football. But after receiving a broken leg in football practice, he decided to switch sports to soccer. He transferred to the University of the South in Sewanee, Tennessee, then one of the few universities in the southern U.S. with a varsity soccer program, in large part because his best friends from high school were already there. And Rote Jr. felt the two of them could help the program.

In addition, Rote Jr. also competed in track and field while at the University of the South.

== Professional ==
Rote was discovered by legendary sports businessman Lamar Hunt, who was searching for an American star to help market the newly established North American Soccer League (NASL). Rote Jr. also played a number of scrimmages against the Tornado during college breaks. The Dallas Tornado selected Rote in the first round of the 1972 draft.

He spent the 1972 season on the bench before becoming a starter in 1973. That season, he became the first American ever to lead the league in scoring (and the only U.S.-born player to do so in the NASL's 17-year history) and was named the Rookie of the Year. In October 1978, the Houston Hurricane purchased Rote's contract from the Tornado for $250,000. He played the 1979 season with Houston, then announced his retirement in February 1980.

Rote Jr. won the made-for-television Superstars competition in 1974, 1975, and 1977.

Rote Jr. earned a total of $185,000 from his three Superstars victories. This compared to $8,000 a year as a U.S. soccer player. He also received “several times my soccer salary” in commercial endorsements. Out of respect for his teammates, he did not upgrade to expensive clothes or an expensive car, although he said, “When you’re young, you’re married, you’re just trying to get started, so it helped us financially, no question about that.” Some U.S. players only received around $2,000 a year, which was below the U.S. poverty line at the time.

While with the Dallas Tornado, Rote Jr. and several teammates would sometimes fly in a day early to promote their team and the sport of soccer overall. This might cause them to miss last-minute practices, but they were willing to do so for the long-term interests of both the Tornado and the sport of soccer in the United States.

== Coach ==
In August 1983, Rote took over as head coach of the Memphis Americans of the Major Indoor Soccer League (MISL). At the time, he was the team's general manager. When the team moved to Las Vegas, Nevada, during the 1984 off-season, Rote chose to remain in Memphis. In July 1984, the Dallas Sidekicks offered him the position of head coach, but Rote declined.

== Business and post-soccer career ==
As an active player, Kyle worked with Jokari, Inc, to revive the Kickari which became the Kikari during 1978. Like the paddle game, the Kikari was a specialized soccer ball attached to weighted base (or stake) via an elastic string. Kyle worked with Jim Brown at Jokari for tournaments and also endorsed the Jokari distributed Subbuteo for the U.S. market. Kyle authored the book Improve Your Soccer With Kikari. Kyle also endorsed a sports drink, Nutrament.

After his retirement, Rote became a sports agent. He currently lives in Memphis, Tennessee, and is the founder and chief executive officer of Athletic Resource Management, Inc., representing professional and post-collegiate athletes and coaches in football and basketball. Rote also works as a motivational speaker.

Rote hosted a local quiz show called News Channel 3 Knowledge Bowl for many years before WREG-TV meteorologist Jim Jaggers took over as host.

== Personal life ==
Rote is married to Mary Lynne Lykins and has four children: Will, John, Josie and Ben. In 2009, he was inducted into the Texas Sports Hall of Fame. On April 10, 2009, the National Soccer Hall of Fame announced that Rote was selected for induction into the Hall of Fame.
