= Hartford Hellions =

- Full name: Hartford Hellions
- Nickname: Hellions
- Founded: 1979
- Dissolved: 1981 (moved)
- Ground: New Haven Coliseum; Hartford Civic Center
- League: MISL

The Hartford Hellions were a soccer team based in Hartford, Connecticut that played in the Major Indoor Soccer League from 1979 to 1981. The Hellions played their first season in the New Haven Coliseum. Before moving to the remodeled Hartford Civic Center they also played games at the Springfield (MA) Civic Center. The team was conceived and owned by Glastonbury accountant William Chipman. In two seasons in Hartford, the Hellions averaged 4,361 fans per game.

In May 1981, Athletes in Action purchased the Hellions and moved the team to Memphis, Tennessee. The new owners renamed the Hellions the Memphis Americans.

== Coaches ==
Hank Liotart – Head Coach 1979-80

- (Germany) Hubert Vogelsinger – Technical Advisor 1979-80

Charlie McCully – Head Coach 1980-81
