= 2015–16 Baltimore Blast season =

Baltimore Blast
2015–16 MASL season
- Owner: Edwin F. Hale, Sr.
- Head Coach: Danny Kelly
- Arena: Royal Farms Arena; 201 West Baltimore Street; Baltimore, Maryland 21201
- Major Arena Soccer League: 1st, Eastern (regular season)
- Ron Newman Cup: MASL Champion
- Top goalscorer: Vini Dantas (20 goals, 10 assists)
- Highest home attendance: 9,442 (November 7 vs. Chicago Mustangs)
- Lowest home attendance: 3,204 (November 21 vs. Waza Flo)
- Average home league attendance: 6,102 (10 games)

The 2015–16 Baltimore Blast season is the twenty-fourth season of the Baltimore Blast professional indoor soccer club. The Blast, an Eastern Division team in the Major Arena Soccer League, play their home games at Royal Farms Arena in downtown Baltimore, Maryland.

The team is led by owner Edwin F. Hale, Sr. and head coach Danny Kelly. Following a 10–5 victory on February 15 over the Chicago Mustangs, Baltimore clinched first place in the Eastern Division and the top seed in the Divisional Final.

The Blast finished the regular season 15-4 and went undefeated in the postseason, winning four of their six playoff games in overtime, en route to the team's eighth championship. Pat Healey won his second consecutive Defender of the Year award while Lucas Roque received the MASL Finals MVP.

== History ==
Launched in July 1992 as the Baltimore Spirit, an expansion team in the second National Professional Soccer League for the 1992–93 season, the team replaced the original Baltimore Blast which folded earlier in 1992 when the first Major Indoor Soccer League shut down. Ed Hale, an owner of the original Blast, bought the Spirit in July 1998 and changed the name to Baltimore Blast. In 2001, the team was a founding member of the second MISL. When that league shut down in 2008, they co-founded the National Indoor Soccer League which, one season later, became the third MISL.

After the 2013-14 season, Baltimore was one of three teams that left the MISL, leading to the league's collapse. Along with five other former MISL teams, the Blast joined the teams of the Professional Arena Soccer League, which was soon rebranded as the Major Arena Soccer League. With the Rochester Lancers folding and the failed launch of Hartford City FC, the MASL Eastern Division for the 2015–16 season consists of former MISL club Syracuse Silver Knights, plus former PASL clubs Waza Flo and Harrisburg Heat.

== Off-field moves ==
All MASL games are now scored with traditional soccer scoring where every goal is worth one point.

== Schedule ==
Win Loss

=== Regular season ===
Game	Day	Date	Kickoff	Opponent	Results		Location	Attendance
Game	Day	Date	Kickoff	Opponent	Score	Record	Location	Attendance
1	Saturday	November 7	7:35pm	Chicago Mustangs	W 7–4	1–0	Royal Farms Arena	9,442
2	Saturday	November 14	7:35pm	Syracuse Silver Knights	W 6–0	2–0	Royal Farms Arena	4,140
3	Saturday	November 21	7:35pm	Waza Flo	W 11–1	3–0	Royal Farms Arena	3,204
4	Saturday	November 28	2:05pm	at Harrisburg Heat	W 9–2	4–0	Farm Show Large Arena	1,973
5	Friday	December 4	7:35pm	San Diego Sockers	W 8–5	5–0	Royal Farms Arena	8,953
6	Saturday	December 11	7:30pm	at Syracuse Silver Knights	W 5–2	6–0	Oncenter War Memorial Arena	1,986
7	Friday	December 18	7:35pm	Harrisburg Heat	W 5–1	7–0	Royal Farms Arena	4,611
8	Thursday	December 31	5:05pm	at Harrisburg Heat	W 8–3	8–0	Farm Show Large Arena	1,583
9	Saturday	January 2	7:05pm	Syracuse Silver Knights	W 7–3	9–0	Royal Farms Arena	4,021
10	Friday	January 8	7:35pm	Waza Flo	W 9–3	10–0	Royal Farms Arena	3,921
11	Saturday	January 9	7:35pm	Harrisburg Heat	W 6–4	11–0	Royal Farms Arena	6,630
12	Sunday	January 24	1:00pm	at Syracuse Silver Knights	L 2–3	11–1	Oncenter War Memorial Arena	2,948
13	Saturday	January 30	7:05pm	at St. Louis Ambush	W 6–1	12-1	Family Arena	5,721
14	Sunday	January 31	3:05pm	at Missouri Comets	L 4–6	12–2	Independence Events Center	4,101
15	Friday	February 12	7:35pm	at Waza Flo	Postponed		Dort Federal Credit Union Event Center	
16	Monday	February 15	6:35pm	at Chicago Mustangs	W 10–5	13–2	Sears Centre Arena	3,339
17	Friday	February 19	7:35pm	Missouri Comets	L 4–5 (OT)	13–3	Royal Farms Arena	8,121
18	Sunday	February 21	5:05pm	Harrisburg Heat	W 9–0	14–3	Royal Farms Arena	7,984
19	Friday	February 26	7:35pm	at St. Louis Ambush	W 9–4	15–3	Family Arena	6,719
20	Saturday	February 27	7:35pm	at Missouri Comets	L 4–5	15–4	Independence Events Center	5,214

=== Post-season ===
Game	Day	Date	Kickoff	Opponent	Results		Location	Attendance
Game	Day	Date	Kickoff	Opponent	Score	Record	Location	Attendance
Division Final #1	Friday	March 11	7:35pm	Syracuse Silver Knights	W 6-5 (3OT)	1–0	Royal Farms Arena	4,041
Division Final #2	Sunday	March 13	4:05pm	at Syracuse Silver Knights	W 6–4	2–0	Oncenter War Memorial Arena	2,042
Eastern Final #1	Thursday	March 24	7:05pm	at Missouri Comets	W 4–3 (OT)	3–0	Independence Events Center	3,011
Eastern Final #2	Tuesday	March 29	7:05pm	Missouri Comets	W 4–3 (2OT)	4–0	Royal Farms Arena	4,102
MASL Final #1	Sunday	April 10	6:05pm	Soles de Sonora	W 7–4	5–0	Royal Farms Arena	7,243
MASL Final #2	Friday	April 15	8:05pm	at Soles de Sonora	W 14–13 (OT)	6–0	El Centro de Usos Múltiples	8,324

.

== Personnel ==
=== Team roster ===
- As of January 15, 2016

Note: Flags indicate national team as defined under FIFA eligibility rules; some limited exceptions apply. Players may hold more than one non-FIFA nationality.

No.	Pos.	Nation	Player
0	GK	ITA	William Vanzela
1	GK	USA	Jeremy Figler
4	FW	USA	Andrew Hoxie
6	DF	JPN	Kaoru Forbess
7	MF	USA	Levi Houapeu
8	FW	BRA	Lucas Roque
9	DF	USA	Pat Healey
11	FW	USA	Tony Donatelli
12	DF	BRA	Adriano Dos Santos
13	DF	USA	Jereme Raley

No.	Pos.	Nation	Player
14	DF	ENG	Onua Obasi
15	FW	ENG	Jamie Darvill
17	MF	USA	Jeremy Ortiz
19	DF	CMR	Uzi Tayou
22	MF	BRA	Juan Pereira
23	MF	BRA	Jonatas Melo
24	FW	FRA	Sofiane Tergou
27	FW	KOR	Jinho Kim
28	FW	BRA	Vini Dantas
80	MF	USA	Geaton Caltabiano

=== Staff ===
The team's coaching staff includes head coach Danny Kelly, assistant coach David Bascome, athletic trainer Heather Kohlbus, physical therapist Paul Ernst, team doctor Dr. Richard Levine, and equipment manager Mark Meszaros. The Blast front office includes owner Edwin F. Hale, Sr., team president and general manager Kevin Healey, assistant general manager Mike Conway, director of ticket operations Jason Carrick, and marketing coordinator Stephen Cooke.

== Statistics ==
=== Top scorers ===
Rank	Scorer	Games	Goals	Assists	Points
1	(United States) Tony Donatelli	18	17	17	34
2	(Brazil) Vini Dantas	12	20	10	30
3	(Brazil) Lucas Roque	18	19	7	26
4	(United States) Pat Healey	19	6	17	23
5	(United States) Andrew Hoxie	19	15	5	20

Last updated on October 18, 2016. Source: "Scoring Leaders". Major Arena Soccer League.
