= 2017–18 Baltimore Blast season =

Baltimore Blast
2017–18 MASL season
- Owner: Edwin F. Hale, Sr.
- Head Coach: Danny Kelly
- Arena: SECU Arena
- Major Arena Soccer League: 1st, Eastern (regular season)
- Ron Newman Cup: MASL Champion
- Top goalscorer: Tony Donatelli (22 goals, 21 assists)
- Highest home attendance: 3,800 (Twice; 2017-12-01 vs. Ontario Fury, and 2018-02-03 vs. Syracuse Silver Knights)
- Lowest home attendance: 2,923 (2017-12-02 vs. St. Louis Ambush)
- Average home league attendance: 3,491 (11 games)

The 2017–18 Baltimore Blast season is the twenty-sixth season of the Baltimore Blast professional indoor soccer club. The Blast, an Eastern Division team in the Major Arena Soccer League, play their home games at SECU Arena in Towson, Maryland.

The team is led by owner Edwin F. Hale, Sr. and head coach Danny Kelly. The Blast entered the season as defending champions as they defeated the Sonora Suns in the Ron Newman Cup finals in April 2017 for the second consecutive season.

Following a 6-5 victory on February 10 over the Milwaukee Wave, Baltimore clinched a playoff berth in the Eastern Division for the 2018 Ron Newman Cup playoffs. The Blast then clinched the regular-season Eastern Division championship after an 8-7 overtime win over the Florida Tropics on February 24. The Blast finished the regular season 17-5 and defeated Syracuse, Milwaukee and Monterrey in the postseason, successfully defending their title en route to the team's tenth championship (including one won by the original Blast franchise). William Vanzela received the MASL Final MVP.

== History ==
Launched in July 1992 as the Baltimore Spirit, an expansion team in the second National Professional Soccer League for the 1992–93 season, the team replaced the original Baltimore Blast which folded earlier in 1992 when the first Major Indoor Soccer League shut down. Ed Hale, an owner of the original Blast, bought the Spirit in July 1998 and changed the name to Baltimore Blast. In 2001, the team was a founding member of the second MISL. When that league shut down in 2008, they co-founded the National Indoor Soccer League which, one season later, became the third MISL.

After the 2013-14 season, Baltimore was one of three teams that left the MISL, leading to the league's collapse. Along with five other former MISL teams, the Blast joined the teams of the Professional Arena Soccer League, which was then rebranded as the Major Arena Soccer League. The MASL Eastern Division for the 2017-18 season remains unchanged from the previous season, consisting of the defending MASL Ron Newman Cup Champion Baltimore Blast, former MISL club Syracuse Silver Knights, former PASL club Harrisburg Heat, and the Florida Tropics.

== Off-field moves ==
The Blast announced in August 2017 that they would move from the Royal Farms Arena to the SECU Arena on the campus of Towson University, beginning in the 2017-2018 MASL season. The move will be the first time the Blast franchise will play home games in an arena other than the Royal Farms Arena.

== Schedule ==
Win Loss

=== Regular season ===
Game	Day	Date	Kickoff	Opponent	Results		Location	Attendance
Game	Day	Date	Kickoff	Opponent	Score	Record	Location	Attendance
1	Friday	November 10	7:35 PM	Cedar Rapids Rampage	W 8–7	1–0	SECU Arena	3,733
2	Friday	November 17	7:35 PM	Syracuse Silver Knights	W 7–6	2–0	SECU Arena	3,521
3	Saturday	November 18	7:35 PM	Florida Tropics	L 4–5	2–1	RP Funding Center	2,356
4	Friday	December 1	7:35 PM	Ontario Fury	W 8–5	3–1	SECU Arena	3,800
5	Saturday	December 2	6:05 PM	St. Louis Ambush	W 5–4	4–1	SECU Arena	2,923
6	Sunday	December 10	3:05 PM	Florida Tropics	W 10–1	5–1	SECU Arena	3,429
7	Friday	December 15	7:35 PM	Florida Tropics	W 7–6	6–1	RP Funding Center	1,741
8	Saturday	December 16	7:05 PM	Harrisburg Heat	L 5–6 (SO)	6–2	Farm Show Large Arena	1,316
9	Saturday	December 30	7:05 PM	Kansas City Comets	W 5–3	7–2	Silverstein Eye Centers Arena	4,009
10	Sunday	December 31	3:05 PM	Cedar Rapids Rampage	W 3–2	8–2	U.S. Cellular Center	1,820
11	Saturday	January 6	6:05 PM	Harrisburg Heat	W 4–3 (OT)	9–2	SECU Arena	3,725
12	Friday	January 12	7:05 PM	Syracuse Silver Knights	W 5–4 (OT)	10–2	Oncenter War Memorial Arena	1,747
13	Friday	January 19	7:35 PM	Kansas City Comets	W 15–8	11–2	SECU Arena	3,041
14	Saturday	January 20	6:05 PM	Harrisburg Heat	W 12–5	12–2	SECU Arena	3,554
15	Friday	January 26	7:35 PM	Harrisburg Heat	W 4–2	13–2	Farm Show Large Arena	1,439
16	Saturday	February 3	6:05 PM	Syracuse Silver Knights	W 8–7 (OT)	14–2	SECU Arena	3,800
17	Saturday	February 10	1:05 PM	Milwaukee Wave	W 6–5	15–2	UW-Milwaukee Panther Arena	3,476
18	Friday	February 16	7:35 PM	Cedar Rapids Rampage	L 5–6	15–3	U.S. Cellular Center	1,826
19	Saturday	February 17	7:05 PM	Milwaukee Wave	L 1–5	15–4	UW-Milwaukee Panther Arena	5,974
20	Friday	February 23	7:35 PM	Milwaukee Wave	W 9–6	16–4	SECU Arena	3,242
21	Saturday	February 24	6:05 PM	Florida Tropics	W 8–7 (OT)	17–4	SECU Arena	3,631
22	Sunday	March 4	4:05 PM	Syracuse Silver Knights	L 4–6	17–5	Oncenter War Memorial Arena	3,007

=== Post-season ===
Game	Day	Date	Kickoff	Opponent	Results		Location	Attendance
Game	Day	Date	Kickoff	Opponent	Score	Record	Location	Attendance
Division Final #1	Thursday	March 8	7:05 P.M.	Syracuse Silver Knights	W 7–6	1–0	Oncenter War Memorial Arena	1,653
Division Final #2	Sunday	March 11	5:05 P.M.	Syracuse Silver Knights	W 5–4	2–0	SECU Arena	3,611
Conference Final	Friday	March 16	7:35 PM	Milwaukee Wave	W 10–6	3–0	SECU Arena	3,173
Final	Sunday	March 25	5:05 P.M.	Monterrey Flash	W 4–3	4–0	Arena Monterrey	8,220

== Personnel ==
=== 2017–18 roster ===
==== Active Players ====
- As of March 6, 2018

Note: Flags indicate national team as defined under FIFA eligibility rules; some limited exceptions apply. Players may hold more than one non-FIFA nationality.

No.	Pos.	Nation	Player
0	GK	BRA	William Vanzela
4	FW	USA	Andrew Hoxie
8	FW	BRA	Lucas Roque
9	DF	USA	Pat Healey
11	MF	USA	Tony Donatelli
12	DF	BRA	Adriano Dos Santos
13	DF	USA	Jereme Raley
16	MF	USA	Nicholas Tait
17	FW	USA	Jamie Thomas
19	DF	BRA	Marco Nascimento

No.	Pos.	Nation	Player
20	DF	USA	Mike Deasel
21	FW	USA	Jon Orlando
22	FW	BRA	Juan Pereira
23	MF	BRA	Jonatas Melo
25	FW	BRA	Daniel Peruzzi
26	DF	BRA	Elton de Oliveria
28	FW	BRA	Vini Dantas
78	FW	USA	Nelson Santana
82	DF	RSA	Jonathan Greenfield
99	GK	USA	Joey Kapinos

==== Inactive Players ====
Note: Flags indicate national team as defined under FIFA eligibility rules; some limited exceptions apply. Players may hold more than one non-FIFA nationality.

No.	Pos.	Nation	Player
7	MF	USA	Ricky Greensfelder

=== Staff ===
The team's coaching staff includes head coach Danny Kelly, assistant coach David Bascome, athletic trainer Heather Kohlbus, physical therapist Paul Ernst, team doctor Dr. Richard Levine, and equipment manager Mark Meszaros. The Blast front office includes owner Edwin F. Hale, Sr., team president and general manager Kevin Healey, and assistant general manager Mike Conway.

== Statistics ==
=== Top scorers ===
Rank	Scorer	Games	Goals	Assists	Points
1	(United States) Tony Donatelli	20	22	21	43
2	(Brazil) Vini Dantas	17	20	15	35
3	(United States) Andrew Hoxie	20	16	9	25
4	(Brazil) Jonatas Melo	22	11	13	24
5	(Brazil) Adriano Dos Santos	20	7	14	21

Last updated on March 6, 2018. Source:
