= 2016–17 Baltimore Blast season =

Baltimore Blast
2016–17 MASL season
- Owner: Edwin F. Hale, Sr.
- Head Coach: Danny Kelly
- Arena: Royal Farms Arena; 201 West Baltimore Street; Baltimore, Maryland 21201
- Major Arena Soccer League: 1st, Eastern (regular season)
- Ron Newman Cup: MASL Champion
- Top goalscorer: Tony Donatelli (18 goals, 19 assists)
- Highest home attendance: 9,722 (February 4 vs. Milwaukee Wave)
- Lowest home attendance: 4,121 (November 18 vs. Florida Tropics SC)
- Average home league attendance: 6,299 (10 games)

The 2016–17 Baltimore Blast season is the twenty-fifth season of the Baltimore Blast professional indoor soccer club. The Blast, an Eastern Division team in the Major Arena Soccer League, play their home games at Royal Farms Arena in downtown Baltimore, Maryland.

The team is led by owner Edwin F. Hale, Sr. and head coach Danny Kelly. The Blast entered the season as defending champions as they defeated the Sonora Suns in the Ron Newman Cup finals in April 2016. Following an 8-4 victory on February 17 over the Syracuse Silver Knights, Baltimore clinched a playoff berth in the Eastern Division for the 2017 Ron Newman Cup playoffs. The Blast then clinched the regular-season Eastern Division championship after a 5-4 overtime win in Syracuse on February 24.

The Blast finished the regular season 14-6 and defeated Harrisburg, Milwaukee and Sonora in the postseason, successfully defending their title en route to the team's ninth championship (including one won by the original Blast franchise). Vini Dantas received the MASL Finals MVP.

== History ==
Launched in July 1992 as the Baltimore Spirit, an expansion team in the second National Professional Soccer League for the 1992–93 season, the team replaced the original Baltimore Blast which folded earlier in 1992 when the first Major Indoor Soccer League shut down. Ed Hale, an owner of the original Blast, bought the Spirit in July 1998 and changed the name to Baltimore Blast. In 2001, the team was a founding member of the second MISL. When that league shut down in 2008, they co-founded the National Indoor Soccer League which, one season later, became the third MISL.

After the 2013-14 season, Baltimore was one of three teams that left the MISL, leading to the league's collapse. Along with five other former MISL teams, the Blast joined the teams of the Professional Arena Soccer League, which was then rebranded as the Major Arena Soccer League. With the Waza Flo folding and the launch of the Florida Tropics SC, the MASL Eastern Division for the 2016-17 season consists of the defending MASL Ron Newman Cup Champion Baltimore Blast, former MISL club Syracuse Silver Knights, former PASL club Harrisburg Heat, and the expansion Tropics.

== Off-field moves ==
In the offseason, the Baltimore Blast, Harrisburg Heat, and St. Louis Ambush left the MASL and joined the expansion Florida Tropics SC to form the Indoor Professional League. The Blast, Heat and Ambush re-joined the MASL in August 2016, with the Tropics being considered an expansion franchise for the MASL.

== Schedule ==
Win Loss

=== Regular season ===
Game	Day	Date	Kickoff	Opponent	Results		Location	Attendance
Game	Day	Date	Kickoff	Opponent	Score	Record	Location	Attendance
1	Saturday	November 5	7:05 pm	Harrisburg Heat	W 11–6	1–0	Farm Show Large Arena	1,627
2	Friday	November 11	7:35 pm	Milwaukee Wave	L 3–4	1–1	Royal Farms Arena	7,813
3	Friday	November 18	7:35 pm	Florida Tropics	W 7–1	2–1	Royal Farms Arena	4,121
4	Saturday	December 3	7:05 pm	Florida Tropics	W 5–1	3–1	Lakeland Center	2,134
5	Saturday	December 10	7:35 pm	Florida Tropics	W 7–0	4–1	Royal Farms Arena	7,450
6	Sunday	December 11	5:05 pm	Kansas City Comets	L 1–5	4–2	Silverstein Eye Centers Arena	3,118
7	Saturday	December 17	7:05 pm	Dallas Sidekicks	W 8–4	5–2	Allen Event Center	1,661
8	Thursday	December 29	7:00 pm	Syracuse Silver Knights	W 6–3	6–2	Oncenter War Memorial Arena	2,032
9	Friday	December 30	7:35 pm	Harrisburg Heat	L 4–7	6–3	Farm Show Large Arena	1,675
10	Saturday	January 7	7:05 pm	Dallas Sidekicks	W 7–2	7–3	Royal Farms Arena	7,230
11	Saturday	January 14	7:05 pm	Harrisburg Heat	W 5–2	8–3	Royal Farms Arena	5,102
12	Friday	January 20	7:05 pm	Cedar Rapids Rampage	L 3–5	8–4	U.S. Cellular Center	1,871
13	Saturday	January 21	6:05 pm	Milwaukee Wave	L 2–7	8–5	UW-Milwaukee Panther Arena	3,171
14	Sunday	January 29	4:05 pm	St. Louis Ambush	W 10–1	9–5	Royal Farms Arena	4,751
15	Saturday	February 4	7:05 pm	Milwaukee Wave	W 5–2	10–5	Royal Farms Arena	9,722
16	Friday	February 17	7:35 pm	Syracuse Silver Knights	W 8–4	11–5	Royal Farms Arena	6,131
17	Sunday	February 19	4:05 pm	Syracuse Silver Knights	L 2–7	11–6	Royal Farms Arena	4,524
18	Friday	February 24	7:30 pm	Syracuse Silver Knights	W 5–4 (OT)	12-6	Oncenter War Memorial Arena	2,949
19	Sunday	February 26	3:05 pm	St. Louis Ambush	W 3–1	13-6	Family Arena	3,378
20	Sunday	March 5	4:05 pm	Harrisburg Heat	W 11–3	14-6	Royal Farms Arena	6,152

=== Post-season ===
Game	Day	Date	Kickoff	Opponent	Results		Location	Attendance
Game	Day	Date	Kickoff	Opponent	Score	Record	Location	Attendance
Division Final #1	Saturday	March 11	7:05 p.m.	Harrisburg Heat	L 4–5	0-1	Royal Farms Arena	4,214
Division Final #2	Wednesday	March 15	7:35 p.m.	Harrisburg Heat	W 7–4	1-1	Farm Show Large Arena	1,142
Division Final #3	Wednesday	March 15	9:35 p.m.	Harrisburg Heat	W 4–1	2-1	Farm Show Large Arena	1,142
Conference Final #1	Saturday	March 18	7:05 p.m.	Milwaukee Wave	W 8–7 (OT)	3-1	Royal Farms Arena	3,235
Conference Final #2	Tuesday	March 21	6:35 p.m.	Milwaukee Wave	L 4–8	3-2	UW-Milwaukee Panther Arena	2,218
Conference Final #3	Tuesday	March 21	8:35 p.m.	Milwaukee Wave	W 2–1	4-2	UW-Milwaukee Panther Arena	2,218
Ron Newman Cup Final #1	Friday	April 7	8:05 pm	Soles de Sonora	L 2–4	4-3	Royal Farms Arena	6,701
Ron Newman Cup Final #2	Sunday	April 9	9:05 pm	Soles de Sonora	W 9–8 (OT)	5-3	El Centro de Usos Múltiples	8,000
Ron Newman Cup Final #3	Monday	April 10	12:05 am	Soles de Sonora	W 1–0	6-3	El Centro de Usos Múltiples	8,000

== Personnel ==
=== Team roster ===
- As of January 13, 2017

Note: Flags indicate national team as defined under FIFA eligibility rules; some limited exceptions apply. Players may hold more than one non-FIFA nationality.

No.	Pos.	Nation	Player
0	GK	ITA	William Vanzela
1	GK	USA	Chris Fenner
4	FW	USA	Andrew Hoxie
6	DF	USA	Josh Hughes
8	FW	BRA	Lucas Roque
9	DF	USA	Pat Healey
11	FW	USA	Tony Donatelli
12	DF	BRA	Adriano Dos Santos
13	DF	USA	Jereme Raley
17	DF	USA	Jamie Thomas

No.	Pos.	Nation	Player
18	MF	USA	Travis Pittman
21	FW	ITA	Daniel Peruzzi
22	MF	BRA	Juan Pereira
23	MF	BRA	Jonatas Melo
24	FW	FRA	Sofiane Tergou
26	DF	BRA	Elton de Oliveria
28	FW	BRA	Vini Dantas
32	DF	USA	Jordan Becker
78	DF	USA	Nelson Santana
80	MF	USA	Geaton Caltabiano

=== Staff ===
The team's coaching staff includes head coach Danny Kelly, assistant coach David Bascome, athletic trainer Heather Kohlbus, physical therapist Paul Ernst, team doctor Dr. Richard Levine, and equipment manager Mark Meszaros. The Blast front office includes owner Edwin F. Hale, Sr., team president and general manager Kevin Healey, assistant general manager Mike Conway, and marketing coordinator Stephen Cooke.

== Statistics ==
=== Top scorers ===
Rank	Scorer	Games	Goals	Assists	Points
1	(United States) Tony Donatelli	20	19	23	42
2	(Brazil) Vini Dantas	18	20	11	31
3	(United States) Andrew Hoxie	19	17	6	23
4	(Brazil) Jonatas Melo	20	11	8	19
5	(Brazil) Lucas Roque	11	6	7	13

Last updated on March 5, 2017. Source:
