= 2014–15 Baltimore Blast season =

Baltimore Blast
2014–15 MASL season
- Owner: Edwin F. Hale, Sr.
- Head Coach: Danny Kelly
- Arena: Royal Farms Arena; 201 West Baltimore Street; Baltimore, Maryland 21201
- Major Arena Soccer League: 1st, Eastern (regular season)
- Ron Newman Cup: Eastern Conference Champion
- Top goalscorer: Tony Donatelli (17 goals, 18 assists)
- Highest home attendance: 7,812 (November 8 vs. Syracuse Silver Knights)
- Lowest home attendance: 4,911 (November 21 vs. Harrisburg Heat)
- Average home league attendance: 6,201 (10 games)

The 2014–15 Baltimore Blast season was the twenty-third season of the Baltimore Blast professional indoor soccer club. The Blast, an Eastern Division team in the Major Arena Soccer League, played their home games at Royal Farms Arena in downtown Baltimore, Maryland.

The team was led by owner Edwin F. Hale, Sr. and head coach Danny Kelly. The Blast finished the regular season with an 18–2 record, good enough for first place in the Eastern Division and the top seed in the Divisional Final. The team defeated the Rochester Lancers to win the Eastern Division and the Missouri Comets to win the Eastern Conference. They were beaten by the Monterrey Flash for the 2014–15 Ron Newman Cup. The MASL honored Pat Healey as league's Defender of the Year and William Vanzela as Goalkeeper of the Year.

== History ==
Launched in July 1992 as the Baltimore Spirit, an expansion team in the second National Professional Soccer League for the 1992–93 season, the team replaced the original Baltimore Blast which folded earlier in 1992 when the first Major Indoor Soccer League shut down. Ed Hale, an owner of the original Blast, bought the Spirit in July 1998 and changed the name to Baltimore Blast. In 2001, the team was a founding member of the second MISL. When that league shut down in 2008, they co-founded the National Indoor Soccer League which, one season later, became the third MISL.

After the 2013-14 season, Baltimore was one of three teams that left the MISL, leading to the league's collapse. Along with five other former MISL teams, the Blast joined the teams of the Professional Arena Soccer League, which was soon rebranded as the Major Arena Soccer League. The other teams in the Eastern Division are former MISL clubs Syracuse Silver Knights and Rochester Lancers, plus PASL clubs Detroit Waza and Harrisburg Heat.

== Off-field moves ==
Four of the five Eastern Division teams (the three former MISL clubs plus Harrisburg) keep score with multi-point scoring at their home games. Most goals are worth two points but goals scored from outside a 45-foot arc on the turf are worth three points. Games played at Detroit or in the Central, Southern, and Pacific Divisions are scored with traditional soccer scoring where every goal is worth one point.

== Schedule ==
Win Loss

=== Pre-season ===
| Game | Day | Date | Kickoff | Opponent | Results | | Location | Attendance |
| Game | Day | Date | Kickoff | Opponent | Score | Record | Location | Attendance |
|---|---|---|---|---|---|---|---|---|
| 1 | Thursday | October 23 | 7:00pm | at Harrisburg Heat | W 31–11 | 1–0 | Sports City Harrisburg | |

=== Regular season ===
| Game | Day | Date | Kickoff | Opponent | Results | | Location | Attendance |
| Game | Day | Date | Kickoff | Opponent | Score | Record | Location | Attendance |
|---|---|---|---|---|---|---|---|---|
| 1 | Saturday | November 8 | 7:35pm | Syracuse Silver Knights | W 16–7 | 1–0 | Royal Farms Arena | 7,812 |
| 2 | Friday | November 14 | 7:35pm | Detroit Waza | W 26–0 | 2–0 | Royal Farms Arena | 5,516 |
| 3 | Friday | November 21 | 7:35pm | Harrisburg Heat | W 27–0 | 3–0 | Royal Farms Arena | 4,911 |
| 4 | Saturday | November 29 | 7:00pm | at Syracuse Silver Knights | W 11–4 | 4–0 | Oncenter War Memorial Arena | 2,951 |
| 5 | Friday | December 12 | 7:35pm | Milwaukee Wave | W 13–8 | 5–0 | Royal Farms Arena | 6,421 |
| 6 | Saturday | December 13 | 7:35pm | Milwaukee Wave | W 14–10 | 6–0 | Royal Farms Arena | 5,311 |
| 7 | Friday | December 19 | 7:30pm | at Syracuse Silver Knights | W 12–4 | 7–0 | Oncenter War Memorial Arena | 2,237 |
| 8 | Saturday | December 27 | 1:00pm | at Rochester Lancers | W 19–8 | 8–0 | Blue Cross Arena | 6,230 |
| 9 | Saturday | January 3 | 7:05pm | at Harrisburg Heat | W 29–8 | 9–0 | Farm Show Large Arena | 1,487 |
| 10 | Saturday | January 10 | 7:35pm | Syracuse Silver Knights | W 22–4 | 10–0 | Royal Farms Arena | 6,431 |
| 11 | Friday | January 16 | 7:05pm | at Milwaukee Wave♣ | W 5–3 | 11–0 | UW–Milwaukee Panther Arena | 2,317 |
| 12 | Saturday | January 17 | 7:05pm | at Detroit Waza♣ | W 9–6 | 12–0 | Melvindale Civic Center | 734 |
| 13 | Saturday | January 24 | 6:05pm | Rochester Lancers | W 15–7 | 13–0 | Royal Farms Arena | 6,942 |
| 14 | Friday | February 6 | 7:00pm | at Las Vegas Legends♣ | L 4–5 (OT) | 13–1 | Orleans Arena | 2,028 |
| 15 | Saturday | February 7 | 7:05pm | at San Diego Sockers♣ | L 2–7 | 13–2 | Valley View Casino Center | 6,247 |
| 16 | Friday | February 13 | 7:35pm | Rochester Lancers | W 11–0 | 14–2 | Royal Farms Arena | 6,761 |
| 17 | Friday | February 20 | 7:35pm | Chicago Mustangs | W 24–0 | 15–2 | Royal Farms Arena | 6,642 |
| 18 | Saturday | February 21 | 6:05pm | Harrisburg Heat | W 25–5 | 16-2 | Royal Farms Arena | 5,270 |
| 19 | Friday | February 27 | 7:35pm | at Harrisburg Heat | W 24–13 | 17–2 | Farm Show Large Arena | 4,989 |
| 20 | Sunday | March 1 | 4:00pm | at Rochester Lancers | W 25–23 | 18–2 | Blue Cross Arena | 10,215 |

♣ Game played with traditional soccer scoring (all goals worth 1 point).

=== Post-season ===
| Game | Day | Date | Kickoff | Opponent | Results | | Location | Attendance |
| Game | Day | Date | Kickoff | Opponent | Score | Record | Location | Attendance |
|---|---|---|---|---|---|---|---|---|
| Division Final | Wednesday | March 11 | 7:05pm | Rochester Lancers | W 6–4 | 1–0 | Royal Farms Arena | 5,544 |
| Eastern Final #1 | Friday | March 13 | 7:35pm | Missouri Comets | W 6–4 | 2–0 | Royal Farms Arena | 4,562 |
| Eastern Final #2 | Sunday | March 15 | 3:05pm | at Missouri Comets♣ | W 10–7 | 3–0 | Independence Events Center | 3,862 |
| MASL Final #1 | Friday | March 20 | 7:35pm | Monterrey Flash | L 4–6 (2OT) | 3–1 | Royal Farms Arena | 6,712 |
| MASL Final #2 | Sunday | March 22 | 5:05pm | at Monterrey Flash♣ | W 6–4 | 4–1 | Arena Monterrey | 8,783 |
| MASL Final #3 | Sunday | March 22 | 7:35pm^{1} | at Monterrey Flash♣ | L 4–3 (OT) | 4–2 | Arena Monterrey | 8,783 |

♣ Game played with traditional soccer scoring (all goals worth 1 point).
^{1} Mini-game played as a tie-breaker.

== Personnel ==
=== Team roster ===
- As of February 24, 2015

Note: Flags indicate national team as defined under FIFA eligibility rules; some limited exceptions apply. Players may hold more than one non-FIFA nationality.

| No. | Pos. | Nation | Player |
|---|---|---|---|
| 0 | GK | ITA | William Vanzela |
| 1 | GK | USA | Phil Saunders |
| 2 | FW | ENG | Jamie Darvill |
| 4 | FW | CRC | Diego Zuniga |
| 6 | DF | CRC | Edwin Cubillo |
| 7 | MF | USA | Levi Houapeau |
| 8 | MF | BRA | Lucas Roque |
| 9 | MF | USA | Pat Healey |
| 11 | MF | USA | Tony Donatelli |
| 12 | DF | BRA | Adriano Dos Santos |
| 13 | FW | BRA | Lucio Gonzaga |

| No. | Pos. | Nation | Player |
|---|---|---|---|
| 14 | DF | ENG | Onua Obasi |
| 15 | FW | BRA | Adauto Neto |
| 16 | FW | HAI | Max Ferdinand |
| 19 | FW | LBR | Jerjer Gibson |
| 20 | DF | USA | Mike Deasel |
| 22 | MF | BRA | Juan Pereira |
| 23 | DF | BRA | Jonatas Melo |
| 24 | DF | USA | Drew Ruggles |
| 25 | DF | USA | Kaoru Forbess |
| 28 | FW | BRA | Vini Dantas |

=== Staff ===
The team's coaching staff includes head coach Danny Kelly, assistant coach David Bascome, trainer Jason Hickman, physical therapist Paul Ernst, team doctor Dr. Richard Levine, and equipment manager Mark Meszaros. The Blast front office includes owner Edwin F. Hale, Sr., team president and general manager Kevin Healey, assistant general manager Mike Conway, director of ticket operations Jason Carrick, and marketing coordinator Stephen Cooke.

== Statistics ==
=== Top scorers ===
| Rank | Scorer | Games | Goals | Assists | Points |
|---|---|---|---|---|---|
| 1 | (United States) Tony Donatelli | 20 | 17 | 18 | 35 |
| 2 | (Brazil) Lucas Roque | 15 | 25 | 7 | 32 |
| 3 | (United States) Pat Healey | 20 | 7 | 22 | 29 |
| 4 | (Haiti) Max Ferdinand | 20 | 12 | 16 | 28 |
| 5 | (Brazil) Adauto Neto | 16 | 9 | 12 | 21 |

Last updated on March 2, 2015. Source: "Scoring Leaders". Major Arena Soccer League.

== Awards and honors ==
Baltimore goalkeeper William Vanzela and defender Pat Healey were selected for the 2014-15 MASL All-League First Team. Baltimore defender Onua Abasi and midfielder/forward Vini Dantas were named to the league's all-rookie team for 2014–15.

On March 13, the MASL announced the finalists for its major year-end awards. These nominees included Baltimore goalkeeper William Vanzela for Goalkeeper of the Year, Pat Healey for Defender of the Year, and defender Onua Obasi for Rookie of the Year. On March 19, the league announced that voters selected Vanzela as the MASL's Goalkeeper of the Year and Healey as Defender of the Year.
