= 2002–03 Major Indoor Soccer League season =

Major Indoor Soccer League
- Season: 2002–03
- Champions: Baltimore Blast
- Matches: 144
- Goals: 1,564 (10.86 per match)
- Top goalscorer: (United States) Dino Delevski (50)
- Biggest home win: Dallas 2–22 Philadelphia (February 8); Philadelphia 6–26 Kansas City (March 4)
- Biggest away win: Milwaukee 23–8 Kansas City (October 12)
- Longest winning run: 11 games by Milwaukee (January 5–February 15)
- Longest losing run: 8 games by Dallas (December 28–February 1)
- Average attendance: 5,420

The 2002–03 Major Indoor Soccer League season was the second season for the league. The regular season started on September 28, 2002, and ended on March 23, 2003.

== Teams ==
Team	City/Area	Arena
Baltimore Blast	Baltimore, Maryland	Baltimore Arena
Cleveland Force	Cleveland, Ohio	CSU Convocation Center
Dallas Sidekicks	Dallas, Texas	Reunion Arena
Harrisburg Heat	Harrisburg, Pennsylvania	Pennsylvania Farm Show Complex & Expo Center
Kansas City Comets	Kansas City, Missouri	Kemper Arena
Milwaukee Wave	Milwaukee, Wisconsin	Bradley Center
Philadelphia KiXX	Philadelphia, Pennsylvania	Wachovia Spectrum
San Diego Sockers	San Diego, California	San Diego Sports Arena

== Map of clubs ==
Eastern Conference Western Conference

== League standings ==
=== Eastern Conference ===
Pos	Team	Pld	W	L	PF	PA	PD	PCT	GB
1	Philadelphia KiXX	36	24	12	406	367	+39	.667	—
2	Cleveland Force	36	19	17	388	428	−40	.528	5
3	Baltimore Blast	36	18	18	394	395	−1	.500	6
4	Harrisburg Heat	36	15	21	423	460	−37	.417	9

=== Western Conference ===
Pos	Team	Pld	W	L	PF	PA	PD	PCT	GB
1	Milwaukee Wave	36	28	8	505	317	+188	.778	—
2	Kansas City Comets	36	17	19	495	472	+23	.472	11
3	San Diego Sockers	36	14	22	361	448	−87	.389	14
4	Dallas Sidekicks	36	9	27	342	427	−85	.250	19

== Playoffs ==
Conference Semi-Finals
E2	Cleveland Force	14
E3	Baltimore Blast	16
W2	Kansas City Comets	13
W3	San Diego Sockers	11

Conference Finals
E1	Philadelphia KiXX	6
E3	Baltimore Blast	8
W1	Milwaukee Wave	20
W2	Kansas City Comets	19

Championship
E3	Baltimore Blast	12	15	13
W1	Milwaukee Wave	19	12	12

== Scoring leaders ==
GP = Games Played, G = Goals, A = Assists, Pts = Points

Player	Team	GP	G	A	Pts
(United States) Dino Delevski	Kansas City	32	50	32	140
(Chile) Carlos Farias	San Diego	35	37	28	111
(United States) Greg Howes	Milwaukee	36	41	16	102
(United States) Joe Reiniger	Milwaukee	32	35	22	100

== League awards ==
- Most Valuable Player: (Federal Republic of Yugoslavia) Dino Delevski, Kansas City
- Defender of the Year: (Mexico) Genoni Martinez, Harrisburg
- Rookie of the Year: (United States) P.J. Wakefield, Baltimore
- Goalkeeper of the Year: (United States) Victor Nogueira, Milwaukee
- Coach of the Year: (United States) Keith Tozer, Milwaukee
- Championship Series MVP: (United States) Denison Cabral, Baltimore

== All-MISL Teams ==
First Team	Pos.	Second Team
(United States) Victor Nogueira, Milwaukee	G	(United States) Pete Pappas, Philadelphia
(United States) Sean Bowers, Baltimore	D	(United States) Troy Dusosky, Milwaukee
(Mexico) Genoni Martinez, Harrisburg	D	(United States) Pat Morris, Philadelphia
(United States) Dino Delevski, Kansas City	F	(Bermuda) David Bascome, Harrisburg
(United States) Greg Howes, Milwaukee	F	(United States) Todd Dusosky, Milwaukee
(United States) Joe Reiniger, Milwaukee	F	(Chile) Carlos Farias, San Diego

=== All-Rookie Team ===
Player	Pos.	Team
(United States) Jesse Llamas	G	Dallas
(United States) Kevin Sakuda	D	San Diego
(United States) Carl Schmitt	D	Milwaukee
(United States) P.J. Wakefield	F	Baltimore
(Canada) Robbie Aristodemo	F	San Diego
(United States) Anthony Maher	F	Cleveland
