= 2003–04 Major Indoor Soccer League season =

Major Indoor Soccer League
- Season: 2003–04
- Champions: Baltimore Blast; 2nd title
- Matches: 162
- Goals: 1,790 (11.05 per match)
- Top goalscorer: (United States) Greg Howes (57)
- Biggest home win: Kansas City 6–15 Milwaukee (November 14)
- Biggest away win: Philadelphia 13–8 Kansas City (November 28); Baltimore 11–6 St. Louis (January 17); Milwaukee 8–3 Philadelphia (February 22); Dallas 8–3 Monterrey (March 10); Dallas 8–3 St. Louis (March 17)
- Longest winning run: 7 games by Baltimore (January 2–23)
- Longest losing run: 7 games by Monterrey (December 27–January 23)
- Average attendance: 5,587

The 2003–04 Major Indoor Soccer League season was the third season for the league. The regular season started on October 4, 2003, and ended on April 5, 2004.

== Teams ==
Team	City/Area	Arena
Baltimore Blast	Baltimore, Maryland	1st Mariner Arena
Cleveland Force	Cleveland, Ohio	CSU Convocation Center
Dallas Sidekicks	Dallas, Texas	Reunion Arena
Kansas City Comets	Kansas City, Missouri	Kemper Arena
Milwaukee Wave	Milwaukee, Wisconsin	UW–Milwaukee Panther Arena
Monterrey Fury	Monterrey, Mexico	Arena Monterrey
Philadelphia KiXX	Philadelphia, Pennsylvania	Wachovia Spectrum
San Diego Sockers	San Diego, California	San Diego Sports Arena
St. Louis Steamers	St. Louis, Missouri	Family Arena

== Map of clubs ==
Eastern Division Central Division Western Division

== League standings ==
=== Central Division ===
Pos	Team	Pld	W	L	GF	GA	GD	PCT	GB
1	Milwaukee Wave	36	27	9	235	161	+74	.750	—
2	Kansas City Comets	36	17	19	227	270	−43	.472	10
3	St. Louis Steamers	36	14	22	158	205	−47	.389	13

=== Eastern Division ===
Pos	Team	Pld	W	L	GF	GA	GD	PCT	GB
1	Baltimore Blast	36	25	11	241	192	+49	.694	—
2	Philadelphia KiXX	36	20	16	194	184	+10	.556	5
3	Cleveland Force	36	15	21	178	200	−22	.417	10

=== Western Division ===
Pos	Team	Pld	W	L	GF	GA	GD	PCT	GB
1	Dallas Sidekicks	36	21	15	213	167	+46	.583	—
2	San Diego Sockers	36	13	23	160	195	−35	.361	8
3	Monterrey Fury	36	10	26	184	216	−32	.278	11

== Playoffs ==
Quarterfinals
4	Philadelphia KiXX	5
5	Kansas City Comets	8
3	Dallas Sidekicks	7
6	Cleveland Force	4

Semifinals
1	Milwaukee Wave	7
5	Kansas City Comets	3
2	Baltimore Blast	6
3	Dallas Sidekicks	1

Championship
1	Milwaukee Wave	3	4	2	–	–
2	Baltimore Blast	12	8	6	–	–

== Scoring leaders ==
GP = Games Played, G = Goals, A = Assists, Pts = Points

Player	Team	GP	G	A	Pts
(United States) Greg Howes	Milwaukee	36	57	28	85
(Mexico) Genoni Martinez	Monterrey	35	39	28	67
(Chile) Carlos Farias	Baltimore	35	22	43	65
(United States) Dino Delevski	Kansas City	30	43	20	63
(United States) Marco Lopez	Monterrey	35	29	32	61
(United States) Todd Dusosky	Milwaukee	31	24	36	60
(United States) Denison Cabral	Baltimore	36	36	16	52
(United States) Paul Wright	San Diego	31	21	28	49
(United States) Steve Butcher	St. Louis	29	31	17	48
(Federal Republic of Yugoslavia) Goran Vasić	Philadelphia	35	14	34	48

== League awards ==
- Most Valuable Player: (United States) Greg Howes, Milwaukee
- Defender of the Year: (Mexico) Genoni Martinez, Monterrey
- Rookie of the Year: (United States) Jamar Beasley, Kansas City
- Goalkeeper of the Year: (United States) Pete Pappas, Philadelphia
- Coach of the Year: (Brazil) Tatu, Dallas
- Championship Series MVP: (United States) Scott Hileman, Baltimore

== All-MISL Teams ==
First Team	Pos.	Second Team
(United States) Pete Pappas, Philadelphia	G	(United States) Dan Green, Milwaukee
(Mexico) Genoni Martinez, Monterrey	D	Sean Bowers, San Diego
(United States) Pat Morris, Philadelphia	D	(United States) Jeff Davis, Kansas City
(United States) Greg Howes, Milwaukee	F	(United States) Dino Delevski, Kansas City
(United States) Todd Dusosky, Milwaukee	F	(United States) Denison Cabral, Baltimore
(Chile) Carlos Farias, San Diego	F	(United States) Don D'Ambra, Philadelphia

=== All-Rookie Team ===
Player	Pos.	Team
(Brazil) Sanaldo Carvalho	G	Kansas City
(United States) Jeremy Aldrich	D	Philadelphia
(United States) Adam Guren	D	Cleveland
(United States) Jamar Beasley	F	Kansas City
(Brazil) Adauto Neto	F	Cleveland
(United States) Shaun David	F	Dallas
