= 2001–02 Major Indoor Soccer League season =

Major Indoor Soccer League
- Season: 2001–02
- Champions: Philadelphia KiXX
- Matches: 132
- Goals: 1,663 (12.6 per match)
- Top goalscorer: (United States) Dino Delevski (86)
- Biggest home win: Harrisburg 6–24 Kansas City (December 1)
- Biggest away win: Baltimore 18–4 Harrisburg (January 13)
- Longest winning run: 8 games by Milwaukee (December 2–January 6, January 13–February 8)
- Longest losing run: 8 games by Harrisburg (March 1–22)
- Average attendance: 5,065

The 2001–02 Major Indoor Soccer League season was the first season for the second incarnation of the Major Indoor Soccer League following the dissolution of the National Professional Soccer League. The regular season started on October 20, 2001, and ended on April 14, 2002.

== Teams ==
Team	City/Area	Arena
Baltimore Blast	Baltimore, Maryland	Baltimore Arena
Cleveland Crunch	Cleveland, Ohio	CSU Convocation Center
Harrisburg Heat	Harrisburg, Pennsylvania	Pennsylvania Farm Show Complex & Expo Center
Kansas City Comets	Kansas City, Missouri	Kemper Arena
Milwaukee Wave	Milwaukee, Wisconsin	Bradley Center
Philadelphia KiXX	Philadelphia, Pennsylvania	Wachovia Spectrum

== Map of clubs ==
Major Indoor Soccer League clubs

== League standings ==
Pos	Team	Pld	W	L	PF	PA	PD	PCT	GB
1	Milwaukee Wave	44	34	10	663	468	+195	.773	—
2	Philadelphia KiXX	44	30	14	578	498	+80	.682	4
3	Kansas City Comets	44	24	20	673	651	+22	.545	10
4	Baltimore Blast	44	18	26	555	589	−34	.409	16
5	Cleveland Crunch	44	16	28	566	623	−57	.364	18
6	Harrisburg Heat	44	10	34	449	655	−206	.227	24

== Playoffs ==
Semifinals
1	Milwaukee Wave	18
4	Baltimore Blast	12
2	Philadelphia KiXX	18
3	Kansas City Comets	13

Championship
1	Milwaukee Wave	11	4	6
2	Philadelphia KiXX	4	11	8

== Scoring leaders ==
GP = Games Played, G = Goals, A = Assists, Pts = Points

Player	Team	GP	G	A	Pts
(United States) Dino Delevski	Kansas City	43	86	31	210
(Canada) Hector Marinaro	Cleveland	42	60	73	188
(United States) Denison Cabral	Baltimore	44	57	24	133
(United States) Joe Reiniger	Milwaukee	35	48	36	131
(Brazil) Nino Da Silva	Kansas City	43	40	36	115
(United States) Wes Wade	Kansas City	40	31	45	110
(United States) Paul Wright	Baltimore	40	30	40	104
(United States) Brian Loftin	Milwaukee	42	43	18	102
(Canada) Chris Handsor	Philadelphia	42	36	26	102
(Romania) Alex Zotincă	Kansas City	43	31	21	98

== League awards ==
- Most Valuable Player: (United States) Dino Delevski, Kansas City
- Defender of the Year: (United States) Sean Bowers, Baltimore
- Rookie of the Year: (United States) Billy Nelson, Baltimore
- Goalkeeper of the Year: (United States) Victor Nogueira, Milwaukee
- Coach of the Year: (United States) Keith Tozer, Milwaukee
- Championship Series MVP: (Canada) Chris Handsor, Philadelphia

== All-MISL Teams ==
=== First Team ===
Player	Pos.	Team
(United States) Victor Nogueira	G	Milwaukee
(United States) Sean Bowers	D	Baltimore
(United States) Pat Morris	D	Philadelphia
(United States) Dino Delevski	F	Kansas City
(Canada) Hector Marinaro	F	Cleveland
(United States) Joe Reiniger	F	Milwaukee

=== Second Team ===
Player	Pos.	Team
(United States) Pete Pappas	G	Philadelphia
(United States) Troy Dusosky	D	Milwaukee
(United States) Nick Corneli	D	Harrisburg
(Brazil) Denison Cabral	M	Baltimore
(United States) Brian Loftin	F	Milwaukee
(Bermuda) David Bascome	F	Harrisburg

=== All-Rookie Team ===
Player	Pos.	Team
(Canada) Brian Bowes	G	Kansas City
(United States) Billy Nelson	D	Baltimore
(Canada) Marco Reda	D	Cleveland
(United States) Johnny Torres	M	Milwaukee
(United States) Jason Webb	M	Harrisburg
(United States) Justin Evans	F	Cleveland
