= 2005–06 Major Indoor Soccer League season =

Major Indoor Soccer League
- Season: 2005–06
- Champions: Baltimore Blast; 3rd title
- Matches: 90
- Goals: 1,004 (11.16 per match)
- Top goalscorer: (United States) Giuliano Celenza (38)
- Biggest home win: Baltimore 3–12 St. Louis (January 24)
- Biggest away win: St. Louis 10–4 Milwaukee (January 13)
- Longest winning run: 8 games by Milwaukee (November 6–December 31)
- Longest losing run: 11 games by California (November 11–January 1)
- Average attendance: 4,737

The 2005–06 Major Indoor Soccer League season was the fifth season for the league. The regular season started on November 6, 2005, and ended on April 9, 2006.

== Teams ==
Team	City/Area	Arena
Baltimore Blast	Baltimore, Maryland	1st Mariner Arena
California Cougars	Stockton, California	Stockton Arena
Chicago Storm	Chicago, Illinois	UIC Pavilion
Milwaukee Wave	Milwaukee, Wisconsin	UW–Milwaukee Panther Arena
Philadelphia KiXX	Philadelphia, Pennsylvania	Wachovia Spectrum
St. Louis Steamers	St. Louis, Missouri	Scottrade Center

== Map of clubs ==
Major Indoor Soccer League clubs

== League standings ==
Pos	Team	Pld	W	L	GF	GA	GD	PCT	GB
1	St. Louis Steamers	30	23	7	199	139	+60	.767	—
2	Baltimore Blast	30	17	13	184	168	+16	.567	6
3	Milwaukee Wave	30	17	13	193	167	+26	.567	6
4	Chicago Storm	30	13	17	145	161	−16	.433	10
5	Philadelphia KiXX	30	10	20	138	175	−37	.333	13
6	California Cougars	30	10	20	145	194	−49	.333	13

== Playoffs ==
Semifinals
1	St. Louis Steamers	7	9	–
4	Chicago Storm	1	2	–
2	Baltimore Blast	10	8	1
3	Milwaukee Wave	4	10	0

Finals
1	St. Louis Steamers	2	4	0
2	Baltimore Blast	4	1	1

== Scoring leaders ==
GP = Games Played, G = Goals, A = Assists, Pts = Points

Player	Team	GP	G	A	Pts
(United States) Greg Howes	Milwaukee	28	37	33	70
(Brazil) Adauto Neto	Baltimore	30	36	22	58
(United States) Todd Dusosky	Milwaukee	30	27	30	57
(Chile) Carlos Farias	St. Louis	28	15	34	49
(United States) Giuliano Celenza	Baltimore	29	38	8	46
(United States) Jamar Beasley	St. Louis	30	33	12	45
(United States) John Ball	California	26	14	22	36
(Canada) Giuliano Oliviero	Milwaukee	27	14	20	34
(United States) Matthew Stewart	Chicago	30	17	15	32
(Mexico) Genoni Martinez	St. Louis	25	16	15	31

== League awards ==
- Most Valuable Player: (Brazil) Adauto Neto, Baltimore
- Defender of the Year: (Mexico) Genoni Martinez, St. Louis
- Rookie of the Year: (Mexico) Vicente Figueroa, California
- Goalkeeper of the Year: (United States) Brett Phillips, St. Louis
- Coach of the Year: (United States) Omid Namazi, St. Louis
- Championship Series Finals MVP: (Jamaica) Machel Millwood, Baltimore

== All-MISL Teams ==
=== First Team ===
Player	Pos.	Team
(United States) Brett Phillips	G	St. Louis
(Mexico) Genoni Martinez	D	St. Louis
(United States) Pat Morris	D	Philadelphia
(United States) Greg Howes	F	Milwaukee
(Brazil) Adauto Neto	F	Baltimore
(United States) Giuliano Celenza	F	Baltimore

=== Second Team ===
Player	Pos.	Team
(Brazil) Sagu	G	Baltimore
(United States) Matt Schmidt	D	Milwaukee
(United States) Lazo Alavanja	D	Chicago
(United States) Danny Kelly	D	Baltimore
(United States) Todd Dusosky	F	Milwaukee
(United States) Jamar Beasley	F	St. Louis
(United States) Shaun David	F	St. Louis
(Chile) Carlos Farias	F	St. Louis

=== All-Rookie Team ===
Player	Pos.	Team
(United States) Dominik Jakubek	G	California
(United States) Denny Clanton	D	Chicago
(United States) Josh Rife	D	Philadelphia
(Denmark) Ronnie Ekelund	M	California
(Mexico) Vicente Figueroa	F	California
(Greece) Gus Kartes	F	Chicago
