= 2013–14 Major Indoor Soccer League season =

Major Indoor Soccer League
- Season: 2013–14
- Champions: Missouri Comets
- Top goalscorer: Ian Bennett (27 goals)
- Biggest home win: BAL 29-0 PEN (December 21)
- Biggest away win: MIS 28-7 STL (November 23); MIS 27-6 STL (February 27)
- Highest scoring: MIS 26-21 STL (February 22)
- Longest winning run: Baltimore, 9 wins January 24, 2014 – March 2, 2014
- Longest losing run: Pennsylvania, 11 losses November 15th, 2013 – January 11, 2014
- Highest attendance: 8,910, BAL @ ROC (February 23)
- Lowest attendance: 922, SYR @ PEN (December 1)
- Average attendance: 4,658

The 2013–14 Major Indoor Soccer League season was the third under the United Soccer Leagues banner, fifth under the MISL name, and the sixth season overall. The season began on November 15 and concluded on March 2. Each team played a 20-game schedule. This was the final season for this third incarnation of the MISL. Six of the seven teams joined the Professional Arena Soccer League, later renamed Major Arena Soccer League.

== News ==
On December 4, the MISL Board of Governors approved video review of three-point goals. The decision states: "Referees will be able to use the reviews to determine the position of the ball in relation to the 3-point arc when the ball was struck. Reviews will not be used to determine if the ball crossed the goal line." The first game the new system was available was the December 6 game between the Pennsylvania Roar and the Rochester Lancers.

== Teams and arenas ==
=== New Teams ===
Team	City/Area	Arena	Joined	Head Coach
Pennsylvania Roar	Reading, Pennsylvania	Sovereign Center	2013	(United States) Eric Puls
St. Louis Ambush	St. Charles, Missouri (St. Louis area)	Family Arena	2013	(United States) Daryl Doran

=== Teams that left the MISL ===
Team	City/Area	Arena	Founded	Joined MISL	Left MISL	New League
Chicago Soul	Hoffman Estates, Illinois (Chicago area)	Sears Centre	2012	2012	2013	Folded
Wichita Wings	Park City, Kansas (Wichita area)	Hartman Arena	2011	2011	2013	Folded

=== Stadiums and locations ===
Baltimore Blast	Rochester Lancers	Pennsylvania Roar	Syracuse Silver Knights
Baltimore Arena	Blue Cross Arena	Santander Arena	War Memorial at Oncenter
Capacity: 11,286	Capacity: 12,000	Capacity: 11,200	Capacity: 6,195

Milwaukee Wave	Missouri Comets	St. Louis Ambush
U.S. Cellular Arena	Independence Events Center	Family Arena
Capacity: 9,500	Capacity: 5,800	Capacity: 9,643

Locations of teams for the 2013–14 Major Indoor Soccer League season.

== Managerial changes ==
Team	Outgoing manager	Incoming manager	Date of appointment
Missouri Comets	(Denmark) Kim Røntved	(North Macedonia) Vlatko Andonovski	Offseason
Rochester Lancers	(United States) Jim Resch	(United States) Josh Rife	Offseason

== Results table ==
Abbreviation and Color Key: Baltimore Blast – BAL • Milwaukee Wave – MIL • Missouri Comets – MIS • Pennsylvania Roar – PEN Rochester Lancers – ROC • St. Louis Ambush – STL • Syracuse Silver Knights – SYR Win • Loss • Home
Club	Match																			
Club	1	2	3	4	5	6	7	8	9	10	11	12	13	14	15	16	17	18	19	20
Baltimore Blast	ROC	MIL	MIL	ROC	PEN	PEN	PEN	MIS	PEN	STL	SYR	SYR	ROC	SYR	STL	MIS	PEN	SYR	ROC	PEN
Baltimore Blast	19-8	0-8	10-12	12-0	21-2	29-0	24-0	14-6	16-5	14-2	8-9	10-5	17-2	12-10	12-6	18-4	23-6	10-9	22-5	18-2
Milwaukee Wave	MIS	BAL	PEN	BAL	MIS	STL	SYC	STL	ROC	MIS	MIS	STL	STL	SYC	ROC	PEN	STL	MIS	STL	MIS
Milwaukee Wave	23-21 (OT)	8-0	21-4	12-10	6-15	24-4	20-10	13-11	28-12	4-22	16-4	21-9	19-12	15-13 (OT)	15-7	30-4	20-9	9-15	16-12	4-9
Missouri Comets	MIL	STL	STL	MIL	STL	SYC	ROC	BAL	ROC	SYC	PEN	MIL	MIL	STL	BAL	PEN	STL	MIL	STL	MIL
Missouri Comets	21-23 (OT)	28-7	12-10 (OT)	15-6	24-13	15-18	19-17	6-14	11-9 (OT)	8-11	13-5	22-4	4-16	26-2	4-18	24-4	26-21	15-9	27-6	9-4
Pennsylvania Roar	SYR	STL	MIL	SYR	ROC	BAL	BAL	ROC	BAL	BAL	MIS	STL	ROC	SYR	MIS	MIL	ROC	BAL	SYR	BAL
Pennsylvania Roar	7-18	4-17	4-21	9-10	2-11	2-21	0-29	5-10	0-24	5-16	5-13	16-0	8-24	13-24	4-24	4-30	2-18	6-23	7-24	2-18
Rochester Lancers	BAL	SYR	SYR	PEN	BAL	STL	SYR	PEN	MIS	STL	MIS	MIL	SYR	PEN	BAL	MIL	SYR	PEN	BAL	SYR
Rochester Lancers	8-19	8-21	8-20	11-2	0-12	16-7	7-10	10-5	17-19	12-14	9-11 (OT)	12-28	16-14	24-8	2-17	7-15	10-17	18-2	5-22	16-17
St. Louis Ambush	PEN	MIS	MIS	SYR	ROC	MIS	MIL	SYR	MIL	ROC	BAL	PEN	MIS	MIL	MIL	BAL	MIL	MIS	MIS	MIL
St. Louis Ambush	17-4	7-28	10-12 (OT)	10-6	7-16	13-24	4-24	14-12	11-13	14-12	2-14	0-16	2-26	9-21	12-19	6-12	9-20	21-26	6-27	12-16
Syracuse Silver Knights	PEN	ROC	ROC	PEN	STL	ROC	MIS	STL	MIL	MIS	ROC	BAL	BAL	PEN	BAL	MIL	ROC	BAL	PEN	ROC
Syracuse Silver Knights	18-7	21-8	20-8	10-9	6-10	10-7	18-15	12-14	10-20	11-8	14-16	9-8	5-10	24-13	10-12	13-15 (OT)	17-10	9-10	24-7	17-16

MISL published schedule and results.

== Standings ==
2013-14 League Champions 2013-14 Playoff Team

Team		GP	W	L	GB	PCT	PF	PA	Home	Road
1	Baltimore Blast	20	17	3	---	.850	309	101	9-1	8-2
2	Milwaukee Wave	20	16	4	1	.800	324	203	8-2	8-2
3	Missouri Comets	20	14	6	3	.700	329	217	7-3	7-3
4	Syracuse Silver Knights	20	12	8	5	.600	278	223	7-3	5-5
5	Rochester Lancers	20	6	14	11	.300	216	280	4-6	2-8
6	St. Louis Ambush	20	4	16	13	.200	186	348	3-7	1-9
7	Pennsylvania Roar	20	1	19	16	.050	105	375	1-9	0-10

Updated to matches played on 3/2/2014

== Statistics ==
=== Top scorers ===
Rank	Scorer	Club	Games	2pt Goals	3pt Goals	Assists	Points
1	(Liberia) Leo Gibson	Missouri Comets	20	21	3	25	76
2	(Jamaica) Kenardo Forbes	Syracuse Silver Knights	20	19	5	14	67
3	(Canada) Ian Bennett	Milwaukee Wave	20	23	4	6	64
4	(Brazil) Marcio Leite	Milwaukee Wave	20	18	1	22	61
5	(Jamaica) Machel Millwood	Syracuse Silver Knights	20	17	1	21	58
6	(Canada) Vahid Assadpour	Missouri Comets	16	18	2	15	57
7	(United States) Mike Lookingland	Baltimore Blast	20	13	4	18	56
8	(Spain) Nick Perera	Milwaukee Wave	19	16	2	13	51
9	(Uruguay) Carlos Muñoz	Milwaukee Wave	17	14	5	6	49
10	(United States) Tony Donatelli	Baltimore Blast	20	18	1	9	48

Last updated on March 4, 2014. Source: MISL.com Statistics - Total Points

=== Top 2pt Goal Scorers ===
Rank	Scorer	Club	Games	2pt Goals
1	(Canada) Ian Bennett	Milwaukee Wave	20	23
2	(Liberia) Leo Gibson	Missouri Comets	20	21
3	(Jamaica) Kenardo Forbes	Syracuse Silver Knights	20	19
4	(United States) Tony Donatelli	Baltimore Blast	20	18
4	(Brazil) Marcio Leite	Milwaukee Wave	20	18
4	(Canada) Vahid Assadpour	Missouri Comets	16	18
7	(Jamaica) Machel Millwood	Syracuse Silver Knights	20	17
8	(United States) Gary Boughton	Rochester Lancers	19	16
8	(Spain) Nick Perera	Milwaukee Wave	19	16
10	(Bosnia and Herzegovina) Slaviša Ubiparipović	Syracuse Silver Knights	17	15

Last updated on March 2, 2014. Source: MISL.com Statistics - Total Points

== Playoffs ==
The MISL Playoffs began with the semifinals, featuring the No. 1 and No. 4 seeds and the No. 2 and No. 3 seeds meeting in home-and-home series with a 15-minute mini game to decide the series following the second game if needed. The championship followed the same format. The higher seed having the option to choose which game it hosts.

Semi-Finals
1	Baltimore	2
4	Syracuse	1
2	Milwaukee	1
3	Missouri	2

Championship
1	Baltimore	1
3	Missouri	2

=== Semi-finals ===
Game 1

March 7, 2014
7:30 PM EST

Syracuse Silver Knights	7 – 20	Baltimore Blast
	Report

Oncenter War Memorial Arena
Attendance: 3,991
Referee: Shane Butler
March 9, 2014
3:10 PM CDT

Missouri Comets	20 – 6	Milwaukee Wave
	Report

Independence Events Center
Attendance: 4,774
Referee: Ryan Cigich

Game 2

March 10, 2014
7:00 PM CDT

Milwaukee Wave	12 – 9	Missouri Comets
	Report

U.S. Cellular Arena
Attendance: 4,236
Referee: Ryan Cigich
March 11, 2014
7:35 PM EDT

Baltimore Blast	6 – 9	Syracuse Silver Knights
	Report

1st Mariner Arena
Attendance: 3,822
Referee: Mark Bailey

Mini-Game Tie Breaker

March 10, 2014
10:00 PM CDT

Milwaukee Wave	2 – 6	Missouri Comets
	Report

U.S. Cellular Arena
Attendance: 4,236
Referee: Ryan Cigich
March 11, 2014
9:55 PM EDT

Baltimore Blast	4 – 3	Syracuse Silver Knights
	Report

1st Mariner Arena
Attendance: 3,822
Referee: Mark Bailey

=== MISL Finals ===
Game 1

March 14, 2014
7:35 PM CDT

Missouri Comets	15 – 8	Baltimore Blast
	Report; Report

Independence Events Center
Attendance: 4,524
Referee: Ryan Cigich

Game 2

March 16, 2014
5:05 PM EDT

Baltimore Blast	19 – 4	Missouri Comets
	Report; Report

1st Mariner Arena
Attendance: 6,447
Referee: Ron Cory

Mini-Game Tie Breaker

March 16, 2014
7:35 PM EDT

Baltimore Blast	4 – 6	Missouri Comets
	Report; Report

1st Mariner Arena
Attendance: 6,447
Referee: Ron Cory

== Awards ==
=== Individual awards ===
Award	Name	Team
MVP	Mike Lookingland	Baltimore Blast
Coach of the Year	Danny Kelly	Baltimore Blast
Rookie of the Year	Odaine Sinclair	St. Louis Ambush
Defender of the Year	Mike Lookingland	Baltimore Blast
Goalkeeper of the Year	William Vanzela	Baltimore Blast
Championship MVP	Brian Harris	Missouri Comets

=== All-League First Team ===
Name	Position	Team
Mike Lookingland	D	Baltimore Blast
Nelson Santana	D	Syracuse Silver Knights
Kenardo Forbes	M/F	Syracuse Silver Knights
Leo Gibson	M/F	Missouri Comets
Marcio Leite	M/F	Milwaukee Wave
William Vanzela	GK	Baltimore Blast

=== All-League Second Team ===
Name	Position	Team
Brian Harris	D	Missouri Comets
Bozidar Jelovac	D	Syracuse Silver Knights
Vahid Assadpour	M/F	Missouri Comets
Ian Bennett	M/F	Milwaukee Wave
Machel Millwood	M/F	Syracuse Silver Knights
Marcel Feenstra	GK	Milwaukee Wave

=== All-Rookie Team ===
Name	Position	Team
Chad Vandegriffe	D	St. Louis Ambush
Tony Walls	D	Milwaukee Wave
Odaine Sinclair	M/F	St. Louis Ambush
Max Touloute	M/F	Missouri Comets
Diego Zuniga	M/F	Baltimore Blast
Scott Krotee	GK	Pennsylvania Roar
