= McAvan =

McAvan is a surname. Notable people with the surname include:

- Bobby McAvan (born 1953), Scottish footballer
- Linda McAvan (born 1962), English politician
