= Robbie Aristodemo =

Canadian soccer player

Personal information
- Full name: Robert David Aristodemo
- Date of birth: May 20, 1977 (age 49)
- Place of birth: Etobicoke, Ontario, Canada
- Height: 5 ft 6 in (1.68 m)
- Position: Central midfielder

Youth career
- Malton Bullets

College career
Years	Team	Apps	(Gls)
1996–2000	Tulsa Golden Hurricane		

Senior career*
Years	Team	Apps	(Gls)
2001–2003	Toronto Lynx	72	(3)
2002–2004	San Diego Sockers (indoor)	72	(20)
2004	Seattle Sounders	8	(0)
2004–2005	Cleveland Force (indoor)	39	(11)
2005–2006	Toronto Lynx	43	(0)
2006–2011	Baltimore Blast (indoor)	143	(39)
2016–2019	Florida Tropics SC (indoor)	20	(2)

International career^{‡}
1993	Canada U17	2	(0)
1996, 1997	Canada U20	9	(0)
1998–2000	Canada U23	16	(0)
1997–2000	Canada	7	(0)
2012	Canada futsal		

Managerial career
- Towson High School JV
- 2010–: Montverde Academy
- 2018–: Clermont Kicks FC
- 2018–2020: Florida Tropics SC (assistant)
- * Club domestic league appearances and goals as of 3 February 2020 ‡ National team caps and goals as of 15 December 2016

Robert David Aristodemo (born May 20, 1977) is a Canadian former professional soccer player who played as a midfielder. He is the current head coach for Montverde Academy's varsity girls team, the Orlando Kicks FC of United Women's Soccer, and an assistant coach with the Major Arena Soccer League's Florida Tropics SC. Aristodemo played indoors for the Baltimore Blast from 2006 to 2011, before he announced his retirement before the 2011–2012 season. Aristodemo came out of retirement on December 15, 2016 to join the expansion Florida Tropics.

== Club career ==
Aristodemo was drafted by the Toronto Lynx out of the University of Tulsa in 2001. In his first season with the Lynx he played 26 games and scored one goal and had three assists. At the end of the season he was awarded A-League Rookie of the year as well as Team MVP in his first season. In 2002, he led the A-League in minutes played. In 2004 the Etobicoke native requested a transfer and signed with the Seattle Sounders where he only played eight games before being released. In 2005 Aristodemo returned to Toronto, where he again missed out on the playoffs. Currently he is ranked second in the All-Time assists leaders for the Lynx with 14. In 2006, he helped the Lynx to a team-record 10-game undefeated streak at home. Aristodemo also helped the Lynx reach the final of the Open Canada Cup which they lost 2–0 against Ottawa St. Anthony Italia. On August 20 prior to the match against Rochester Rhinos he was honoured for reaching a career milestone of playing his 100th game for the Lynx.

=== Indoors ===
Aristedemo played indoors for the 2002-3 and 2003–4 seasons with the San Diego Sockers of the Major Indoor Soccer League. He joined the Cleveland Force of MISL in 2004 and played one season there before joining the Baltimore Blast in 2005. Aristodemo won three championships with Baltimore and also captained the team for a time.

== International career ==
Aristodemo played at the 1993 FIFA U-17 World Championship in Japan, in a team alongside Paul Stalteri and Jason Bent. He then also played at the 1997 FIFA World Youth Championship in Malaysia, again with Stalteri and Bent.

He made his senior debut for Canada in an August 1997 friendly match against China. He earned a total of 7 caps, scoring no goals. He has represented Canada in 1 FIFA World Cup qualification match. In 2000, he was part of Canada's squad that won their first 2000 CONCACAF Gold Cup, but he did not play.

His final international was a June 2000 World Cup qualification match against Cuba.

Aristodemo was included in Canada's 2012 CONCACAF Futsal Championship team, making him the only Canadian to have played on all Canadian nations teams, both indoor and outdoor.

== Personal life ==
Aristodemo and his wife Carrie have a 14-year-old daughter named Zallie and a 12-year-old son named Ryker. He graduated from the University of Tulsa with a degree in exercise science. In addition he coached Towson High School's girls JV soccer team for 3 years.

Since 2010, Aristodemo has coached the girls varsity team at Montverde Academy near Orlando, Florida.

As of the 2021-22 Major Arena Soccer League season, Aristodemo is also providing broadcast commentary for the Florida Tropics.

== Achievements ==
- CONCACAF U20 Tournament – 1996
- CONCACAF Gold Cup – 2000
- A-League Rookie of the Year and Team MVP – 2001
