= Pennsylvania Roar =

- Founded: 2013
- Dissolved: 2014
- Ground: Santander Arena
- Capacity: 7,083
- League: Major Indoor Soccer League
- 2013-14: Regular Season: 7th Place; Playoffs: Did not qualify

The Pennsylvania Roar was the name of a professional indoor soccer team based in Reading, Pennsylvania. They were a member of the Major Indoor Soccer League.

The Roar were co-owned by Glen Goldstein and his wife, Dawn Goldstein, who also co-owned the St. Louis Ambush of the MISL.

== Year-by-year ==
Year	League	Reg. season	Playoffs	Attendance average
2013-14	MISL III	7th MISL, 1–19	Did not qualify	1,549
Total		1-19; Win % = .050	N/A; Win % = N/A	1,549

== Head coaches ==
- (United States) Eric Puls

== Arenas ==
- Santander Arena
