= Rusty Troy =

American soccer player (born 1966)

Personal information
- Date of birth: November 15, 1966 (age 59)
- Place of birth: Houston, Texas, United States
- Date of death: September 12, 2026
- Height: 6 ft 0 in (1.83 m)
- Positions: Forward; defender

College career
| Years | Team | Apps | (Gls) |
| 1984–1987 | North Texas Mean Green | | |

Senior career*
| Years | Team | Apps | (Gls) |
| 1988–1992 | Baltimore Blast (indoor) | 185 | (78) |
| 1990 | Washington Diplomats | | |
| 1992–1994 | Baltimore Spirit (indoor) | 76 | (74) |
| 1994 | Baltimore Bays | 4 | (0) |
| 1994 | Las Vegas Dustdevils (indoor) | 19 | (13) |
| 1995–2001 | Dallas Sidekicks (indoor) | 111 | (79) |
| 1997–1999 | Milwaukee Wave (indoor) | 53 | (22) |

International career
| 1998 | USA Futsal | | |
- * Club domestic league appearances and goals

Rusty Troy is a retired American soccer player. He played for the University of North Texas. He was drafted and played professionally in the Major Indoor Soccer League, National Professional Soccer League, American Professional Soccer League and USISL. He was the 1989 MISL Rookie of the Year and the 1998 PSA Defender of the Year.

== Youth ==
Troy played his youth soccer in Dallas Texas for club team called the Texas Longhorns. In 1984, Troy graduated from MacArthur High School (Irving, Texas). He attended the University of North Texas, playing on the men's soccer team from 1984 to 1987.He started every game for the University of North Texas.

== Professional ==
Troy was selected by the Chicago Sting with the 3rd pick of the 1st round in the 1988 MISL draft. Baltimore selected him with the 1st pick in the Dispersal draft after the sting folded that summer. In June 1988, the Chicago Sting selected Troy in the first round (third overall) of the 1988 Major Indoor Soccer League college draft. The Milwaukee Wave also selected him with the first pick of the 1988 American Indoor Soccer Association Amateur Draft. Troy signed with the Sting, but when the team folded soon after, the Baltimore Blast took him with the first pick in the Dispersal Draft. He became a regular on the Blast as the team went to the MISL finals and Troy was named the 1989 MISL Rookie of the Year. Troy played for the Blast until they folded in 1992. In 2012, he was inducted into the Baltimore Blast Hall of Fame. In 1990, Troy spent the summer with the Washington Diplomats of the American Professional Soccer League. In 1992, he signed with the expansion Baltimore Spirit of the National Professional Soccer League. In 1994, after completing the indoor season with the Spirit, Troy moved to the outdoor Baltimore Bays of the USISL. He played four games, then returned to the University of North Texas to finish his degree in finance. That summer, he also played for the Las Vegas Dustdevils as they won the Continental Indoor Soccer League title. In 1995, Troy signed as a free agent with the Dallas Sidekicks. He would play for the Sidekicks every summer until his retirement in 2001. In 1998, he was the Premier Soccer Alliance Defender of the Year.Dallas Sidekicks In addition to his summers with the Dallas Sidekicks.Troy also spent two winter indoor seasons (1997–1999) with the Milwaukee Wave. On April 9, 2001, Troy announced his retirement from soccer with the Dallas Sidekicks at the end of the 2001 WISL season. In 1998, he was the Premier Soccer Alliance Defender of the Year for the Dallas Sidekicks. Troy was selected as the 1989 MISL Rookie of the Year. He is one of a select group of 8 players too have won two championships with the Dallas Sidekicks. One in 1994 in the Continental Indoor Soccer League and the other in 1998 the Premier Soccer Alliance with the Dallas Sidekicks

== International ==
Troy played for United States national futsal team at the 1998 Rio de Janeiro Futsal Tournament. Troy retired from professional soccer on April 9, 2001.
