= Mike Stankovic =

Serbian-American soccer player

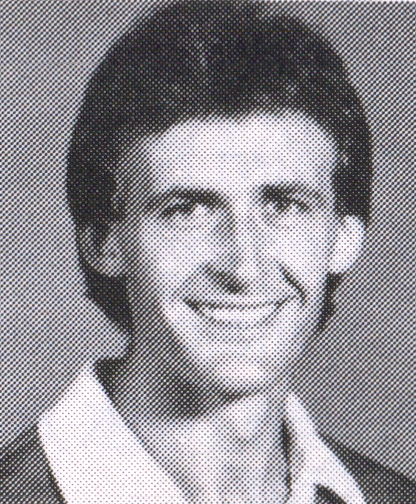
- Stankovic circa 1984

Personal information
- Date of birth: November 11, 1956 (age 69)
- Place of birth: Kaludra, Yugoslavia
- Position: Defender

Senior career*
Years	Team	Apps	(Gls)
1980	Memphis Rogues	28	(5)
1980–1981	Dallas Tornado (indoor)	16	(24)
1981	Dallas Tornado	15	(0)
1981–1987	Baltimore Blast (indoor)	212	(120)
1987–1989	Wichita Wings (indoor)	96	(42)
1989–1991	Baltimore Blast (indoor)	74	(34)
1992–1998	Baltimore Blast (indoor)	108	(67)

Managerial career
- 1991–1992: Baltimore Blast (assistant)
- 1992–1996: Baltimore Blast (assistant)
- 1996–1998: Baltimore Blast
- 2010: Ghana (assistant)
- 2011: Qatar (assistant)
- * Club domestic league appearances and goals

Mike Stankovic (born November 11, 1956) is a Serbian-American retired soccer defender who played professionally in the North American Soccer League, Major Indoor Soccer League and National Professional Soccer League.

== Biography ==
In 1980, he moved to the United States where he signed with the Memphis Rogues of the North American Soccer League., where he was voted Most Valuable Player but missed their run at the 1979–80 NASL Indoor season finals through suspension after receiving a red card in the Division Finals against the Minnesota Kicks.

He moved to the Dallas Tornado in the fall of 1980 and played for the Tornado during the 1980-1981 NASL indoor season. He played the 1981 outdoor season with the Tornado, then moved indoors permanently when he signed with the Baltimore Blast of the Major Indoor Soccer League. In August 1987, he signed as a free agent with the Wichita Wings. During his six seasons with the Blast, Stankovic was a five time All Star. On January 20, 1989, the Wings traded Stankovic and Peter Ward to the Blast in exchange for Keder and David Byrne.

After retiring from pro soccer he founded the "Mike Stankovic Pro Soccer Academy". In 2010, Stankovic served as an assistant to Milovan Rajevac on the Ghana national football team at the 2010 FIFA World Cup. After the cup, Rajevac and Stankovic moved to manage the Qatar national football team.

In March 2013, Stankovic was one of six men named to the 2013 class of the Indoor Soccer Hall of Fame. The other inductees are Gordon Jago, Preki, Kai Haaskivi, Zoltán Tóth, and Brian Quinn.

In 2023, the Baltimore Blast retired jersey #5 to honor Stankovic and Denison Cabral.

== Awards and honors ==
- MISL All-Star Team: 1985
- MISL 10th Year Anniversary All Decade Team
- Voted Memphis Rogues Most Valuable Player: 1980
- 1983–84 Major Indoor Soccer League Champion
