= Marcio Leite =

Brazilian footballer

Márcio Leite
Personal information
- Full name: Márcio Leite
- Date of birth: August 5, 1984 (age 42)
- Place of birth: Aracaju, Brazil
- Height: 6 ft 0 in (1.83 m)
- Positions: Defender; midfielder

Team information
- Current team: Milwaukee Wave
- Number: 77

Senior career*
Years	Team	Apps	(Gls)
2006–	Milwaukee Wave (indoor)	241	(171)
2007	→ Carolina RailHawks (loan)	12	(0)
2009	Croatian Eagles		
2021	→ San Diego Sockers (loan; indoor)	9	(0)
- * Club domestic league appearances and goals as of 16 December 2022

Márcio Leite (born August 5, 1984, in Aracaju) is a Brazilian soccer player who currently plays for the Milwaukee Wave of the MASL in the United States.

Leite signed with the Milwaukee Wave of the then Major Indoor Soccer League in the fall of 2006. In the summer of 2007, the Wave sent him on loan with the expansion Carolina RailHawks of the USL First Division. He played twelve games with the RailHawks and returned to Milwaukee for the 2007–2008 season. In the fall of 2008, the Wave moved to the newly created Xtreme Soccer League. However, Leite suffered a season ending torn anterior cruciate ligament in his left knee in the first pre-season game. He then spent the winter in rehabilitation and working as a coach. Leite was injured again with the same injury while playing for the Croatian Eagles Soccer Club in the annual Labor Day Croatian-North American Soccer Tournament in Cleveland, Ohio in September 2009.
