= Monterrey Fury =

Mexican football club

Monterrey Fury/Tigres UANL
- Full name: Monterrey Fury; UANL Tigres
- Founded: 2003
- Dissolved: 2004
- Ground: Arena Monterrey; 2003–2004
- Capacity: 17,599
- League: Major Indoor Soccer League
| Home colors | Away colors |

The Monterrey Fury were a Mexican team playing in a United States–based soccer league. The team was awarded a Major Indoor Soccer League expansion franchise for the 2003–2004 season. The most notable thing that happened to the team during its first season was that it was forced to forfeit several games after using an illegal player.

Shortly before the start of the 2004–2005 season, the MISL terminated the Fury franchise because of "a long series of non-compliance and disregard for the obligations and responsibilities of an MISL member club." UANL Tigres, a Mexican 1st Division team, was awarded a new MISL franchise. However, because of a dispute over who owned the rights to an MISL franchise in Monterrey, the Tigres elected not to complete its purchase of the team, and the MISL voted to discontinue operations in Mexico on December 30, 2004.

The team's home and road games were all broadcast live on local television and radio.

== Year-by-year ==
| Year | League | Reg. season | Playoffs |
|---|---|---|---|
| 2003–04 | MISL | 3rd West, 10–26 | Failed to Qualify |
| 2004–05 | MISL | 9th MISL, 1–5 | Monterrey Tigres folded |

== Head coaches ==
- Andres Carranza (2003–2004)
- Erich Geyer (2004)

== Arena ==
- Arena Monterrey (2003–2004)
