= Bobby McAvan =

Scottish-Canadian soccer player

Personal information
- Date of birth: December 3, 1953 (age 72)
- Place of birth: Dundee, Scotland
- Positions: Forward; midfielder; defender

Senior career*
Years	Team	Apps	(Gls)
1981–1985	Baltimore Blast (indoor)	97	(9)

Managerial career
- 2002–2003: Baltimore Blast
- * Club domestic league appearances and goals

Bobby McAvan is a retired Scottish-Canadian professional soccer player. After retiring, he became a commentator on the Baltimore Blast games, before coaching them for the 2002-03 season.
