= Andrew Hoxie =

American soccer player (born 1986)

Personal information
- Full name: Andrew Jerod Hoxie
- Date of birth: October 8, 1986 (age 40)
- Place of birth: Enid, Oklahoma, United States
- Height: 6 ft 4 in (1.93 m)
- Position: Forward

Team information
- Current team: Utica City
- Number: 9

College career
Years	Team	Apps	(Gls)
2005–2009	William & Mary Tribe		

Senior career*
Years	Team	Apps	(Gls)
2005–2008	Virginia Legacy	46	(20)
2010–2013	Rochester Rhinos	81	(17)
2010	→ Harrisburg City Islanders (loan)	1	(0)
2014	Orange County Blues	16	(2)
2014–2015	Rochester Lancers (indoor)	19	(19)
2015	PSA Elite		
2015–2021	Baltimore Blast (indoor)	94	(67)
2021–2022	Florida Tropics (indoor)	4	(0)
2022–	Utica City (indoor)	11	(2)
- * Club domestic league appearances and goals as of April 18, 2022

Andrew Jerod Hoxie (born October 8, 1986) is an American soccer player for Utica City FC in the Major Arena Soccer League.

== Career ==
=== College and amateur ===
Hoxie grew up in Newport News, Virginia, and attended Denbigh Baptist Christian School, where he won a state championship with the Minutemen. The team was coached by his father, Hal Hoxie. He played four years of college soccer at The College of William & Mary from 2005 to 2009 (redshirting in 2008), garnishing the CAA Player of the Year Award in his senior season, as well as earning third team All-American honors in 2009, and finishing his career with the Tribe with 91 points on 35 goals and 21 assists.

During his college years Hoxie also played for Virginia Legacy in the USL Premier Development League, scoring 20 goals in 42 appearances in his 4 campaigns with the club.

=== Professional ===
Hoxie was drafted in the third round (37th overall) of the 2010 MLS SuperDraft by San Jose Earthquakes, having impressed professional scouts at the 2010 MLS Combine by scoring two goals and adding an assist in three games, but was not offered a contract with the MLS team.

Hoxie signed with USSF Division 2 club Rochester Rhinos on March 30, 2010, and made his professional debut on April 10, 2010, in Rochester's season opening game against Miami FC. He scored hs first professional goal on April 25, 2010, in a game against the Austin Aztex. Rochester re-signed Hoxie for the 2012 season on October 25, 2011.

In November 2021, Hoxie signed with Florida Tropics SC.

On February 2, 2022, the Tropics conducted a trade with Utica City FC that saw Hoxie and Lucio Gonzaga move to Utica in exchange for Ricardo Diegues and Alencar Ventura Junior.

== Honors ==
=== Rochester Rhinos ===
- USSF Division 2 Pro League Regular Season Champions (1): 2010

=== Baltimore Blast ===
- Major Arena Soccer League Ron Newman Cup (3): 2015, 2016, 2017
