= Adauto Neto =

Brazilian footballer (born 1980)

Personal information
- Full name: Adauto Neto Calheira
- Date of birth: December 31, 1980 (age 45)
- Place of birth: Itabuna, Brazil
- Height: 5 ft 10 in (1.78 m)
- Position: Attacking midfielder

Youth career
- 1995–1998: Esporte Clube Vitória

College career
| Years | Team | Apps | (Gls) |
| 1999–2001 | Mobile Rams | | |

Senior career*
| Years | Team | Apps | (Gls) |
| 2000 | Mid Michigan Bucks | 3 | (0) |
| 2002 | Dallas Burn | 4 | (0) |
| 2003 | Syracuse Salty Dogs | 19 | (1) |
| 2003–2005 | Cleveland Force (indoor) | 51 | (44) |
| 2004 | Rochester Rhinos | 16 | (0) |
| 2005–2008 | Baltimore Blast (indoor) | 100 | (46) |
| 2008–2009 | New Jersey Ironmen (indoor) | 21 | (2) |
| 2009–2010 | Philadelphia KiXX (indoor) | 20 | (18) |
| 2010 | Crystal Palace Baltimore | 29 | (2) |
| 2010–2015 | Baltimore Blast (indoor) | 92 | (61) |
| 2015–2016 | Harrisburg Heat (indoor) | 3 | (0) |

Managerial career
- 2021–: Baltimore Blast (assistant)
- * Club domestic league appearances and goals as of May 12, 2020

Adauto Neto Calheira (born December 31, 1980) is a Brazilian soccer player who is currently an assistant coach for the Baltimore Blast in the Major Arena Soccer League.

== Career ==
=== College and amateur ===
Neto came from his native Brazil to the United States in 1999 to play college soccer at the University of Mobile. During his four years with the Rams he was a three-time NAIA Division 3 All-American.

During his college years Neto also briefly played with the Mid-Michigan Bucks in the Premier Development League.

=== Professional ===
Neto was drafted in the fourth round (44th overall) of the 2002 MLS SuperDraft by Dallas Burn, and featured in 4 regular season Major League Soccer games for the team in his debut season, before being released at the end of the season. He subsequently played for the Syracuse Salty Dogs and the Rochester Rhinos in the A-League.

Neto also has extensive indoor soccer experience, having spent seven years playing in the Major Indoor Soccer League and the Xtreme Soccer League with Cleveland Force, Baltimore Blast, the New Jersey Ironmen, and the Philadelphia KiXX. He was voted the 2004–05 MISL Most Valuable Player, won two MISL titles (both with the Blast), and helped bring the Ironmen within a single game of a championship in 2009.

After six years out of the professional outdoor game, Neto signed with Crystal Palace Baltimore of the USSF Division 2 Professional League prior to the 2010 season.

=== Coaching ===
Neto joined the Baltimore Blast coaching staff in December 2021.

== Club career statistics ==
(correct as of 1 October 2010)

| Club | Season | League | | | Cup | | | Play-Offs | | | Total | | |
| Club | Season | Apps | Goals | Assists | Apps | Goals | Assists | Apps | Goals | Assists | Apps | Goals | Assists |
|---|---|---|---|---|---|---|---|---|---|---|---|---|---|
| Dallas Burn | 2002 | 4 | 0 | ? | ? | ? | ? | - | - | - | 4 | 0 | ? |
| Syracuse Salty Dogs | 2003 | 19 | 1 | ? | ? | ? | ? | - | - | - | 19 | 1 | 0 |
| Rochester | 2004 | 16 | 0 | ? | ? | ? | ? | - | - | - | 16 | 0 | 0 |
| Crystal Palace Baltimore | 2010 | 29 | 2 | 3 | 1 | 0 | 0 | - | - | - | 30 | 2 | 3 |
| Total | 2010–present | 29 | 2 | 3 | 0 | 0 | 0 | - | - | - | 30 | 2 | 3 |
| Career totals | | 68 | 3 | 3 | 1 | 0 | 0 | - | - | - | 69 | 3 | 3 |
