= Pat Healey =

American soccer player (born 1985)

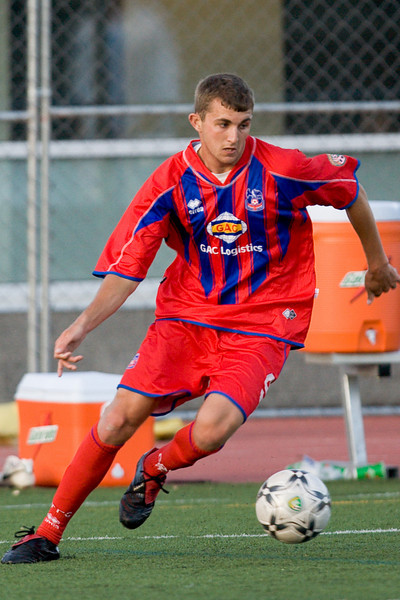
- Healey with Crystal Palace Baltimore in 2008

Personal information
- Full name: Patrick Joseph Healey
- Date of birth: December 20, 1985 (age 40)
- Place of birth: Baltimore, Maryland, United States
- Height: 5 ft 11 in (1.80 m)
- Position: Midfielder

College career
Years	Team	Apps	(Gls)
2004–2007	Towson Tigers		

Senior career*
Years	Team	Apps	(Gls)
2008–2010	Crystal Palace Baltimore	64	(7)
2008–2018	Baltimore Blast (indoor)	201	(71)
2023–2024	Harrisburg Heat (indoor)	6	(0)

International career^{‡}
2012–2018	United States futsal		

Managerial career
- 2018–2025: Harrisburg Heat
- 2025–: Lady of Mt. Carmel
- * Club domestic league appearances and goals as of November 27, 2024 ‡ National team caps and goals as of July 3, 2014

Pat Healey (born December 20, 1985) is an American soccer coach and former player, who is currently coaching at Lady of Mt. Carmel. He was formerly the head coach and general manager of the Harrisburg Heat and played for the Baltimore Blast, both in the Major Arena Soccer League.

== Early life ==
Healey, who was born in Baltimore, Maryland and grew up in Bel Air, Maryland, and attended Calvert Hall College High School.

== Career ==
=== Playing ===
==== College ====
Healey played college soccer at Towson University. He was named the 2007 Colonial Athletic Association Player of the Year, was a three-time All-CAA selection, and a two-time NSCAA/ADIDAS All-South Atlantic Region player.

==== Professional ====
Healey was drafted in the first round of the 2008 MLS Supplemental Draft by the Kansas City Wizards, but was released on February 19, 2008, after the team's initial pre-season training camp.

He signed his first professional contract with Crystal Palace Baltimore of the USL Second Division on March 18, 2008, clocking over 40 appearances for the team, and helping them to the 2008 USL Second Division playoffs. On March 16, 2010, Baltimore announced the re-signing of Healey to a new contract for the 2010 season.

Healey also has experience playing professional indoor soccer. He was selected in the Territorial Round of the 2008 MISL Amateur Draft by the Baltimore Blast, and signed a contract to play with the Blast during the USL2 offseasons in October 2008. With the Blast, Healey was a member of the team which won the 2008/2009 NISL Championship.

Healey was one of only three Blast players to play all 20 regular season games for the 2009–10 MISL. He scored six goals and assisted on six more. In the playoffs, he had two assists in his team's two games. Healey significantly upped his scoring tally for the 2010–11 MISL season, leading the team with 17 goals and 48 total points. He went goalless however in the Blast's playoff championship game, despite registering 4 shots on goal, as the Blast fell soundly to the Milwaukee Wave, 7–16.

On January 8, 2023, Healey played for his Harrisburg Heat team as a player-coach due to injuries and illnesses that left the Heat short-handed.

=== Coaching ===
In August 2018, it was announced that the Harrisburg Heat had signed Healey as head coach and general manager. In October 2025, the Heat announced that Pat Healey was stepping down from his roles in order to accept a coaching position at Lady of Mt. Carmel, so that he spend more time with his family.

== Personal life ==
Healey is the son of Kevin Healey, who is currently the president of the Harrisburg Heat and previously served as general manager and coach of the Baltimore Blast. Pat Healey played and coached under his father’s leadership at both teams.

== Career statistics ==
As of 2 October 2010

Appearances and goals by club, season and competition
Club	Season	League		Cup (Note: Includes Lamar Hunt US Open Cup)		Play-Offs		Total	
Club	Season	Apps	Goals	Apps	Goals	Apps	Goals	Apps	Goals
Crystal Palace Baltimore	2008	19	5	4	2	2	1	25	8
Crystal Palace Baltimore	2009	19	2	1	0	0	0	20	2
Crystal Palace Baltimore	2010	26	0	1	0	0	0	27	0
Total		64	7	6	2	1	72	10	5
