= Denison Cabral =

Brazilian-American soccer player (born 1974)

Personal information
- Date of birth: January 26, 1974 (age 52)
- Place of birth: Florianópolis, Brazil
- Height: 5 ft 6 in (1.68 m)
- Positions: Forward; midfielder

Senior career*
Years	Team	Apps	(Gls)
- Sadia
- Palmeiras
1994–1997	Washington Warthogs (indoor)	100	(109)
1996–1998	Baltimore Bays (indoor)		
1998–2010	Baltimore Blast (indoor)	356	(445)
2017–2018	Harrisburg Heat (indoor)	7	(2)

International career
2007–2008	US Futsal		

Managerial career
- 2016–2018: Harrisburg Heat
- * Club domestic league appearances and goals

Denison Cabral is a retired Brazilian-American soccer forward /midfielder who played professionally in the Continental Indoor Soccer League, National Professional Soccer League and USISL. He played three games for the United States national futsal team at the 2008 FIFA Futsal World Cup, scoring one goal for the American team. In 2007 the Brazilian-American participated in his first official FIFA event as a member of the US Futsal Men's team in the 2007 Pan American games in Rio de Janeiro, Brasil. Denison served as the captain of the United States national futsal Team in the world cup qualifying tournament CONCACAF in Guatemala 2008.

Cabral began his career with Sadia F.A. and Palmeiras. In 1994, he moved to the United States to train and perhaps play with a local outdoor team. While in Florida, he saw an indoor game on television. He decided to attend a trial with the Washington Warthogs of the Continental Indoor Soccer League and gained a contract. Cabral went on to play four seasons with the Warthogs. In the fall of 1995, Cabral attended an open tryout with the Baltimore Bays of the USISL. He impressed the Bay's coach, Kevin Healey, enough to gain a contract. Since the Warthogs played a summer indoor season and the Bays played from November through February, this allowed Cabral to move between the two teams without conflict. In his first season with the Bays, Cabral won the USISL indoor championship, scoring five goals in the final and gaining both regular season and playoff MVP awards. Cabral began the 1997–98 USISL I-League season with the Bays. In January 1998, the Bays released Cabral to allow him to sign with the Baltimore Spirit of the National Professional Soccer League as the Spirit released Jason Dieter in order to allow him to sign with the Bays. That summer the Spirit were renamed the Baltimore Blast. Cabral remained with the Blast until September 2010, when the Blast released Cabral after the team could not come to a contract agreement with him. In November 2004, he injured his right knee, losing most of the season. Then in February 2006, he injured his left knee, again losing most of the season. During his years with Baltimore, Cabral won five championships (2003, 2004, 2006, 2008, 2009), was a six-time All Star, and was MVP of the 2003 championship series.

Cabral was named the head coach of the Harrisburg Heat prior to the 2016-2017 MASL Season. Cabral lead the Heat to a 10–10 record, and their first playoff appearance in the MASL, being named Coach of the Year in the process.

In 2023, the Baltimore Blast retired jersey #5 to honor Cabral and Mike Stankovic.

== International ==
In May 2007, Cabral became an American citizen. He immediately began to play for the United States national futsal team, participating in the 2007 Pan American games in Rio, 2008 COMCACAF in Guatemala, and at the 2008 FIFA Futsal World Cup.
