= Vini Dantas =

Brazilian footballer

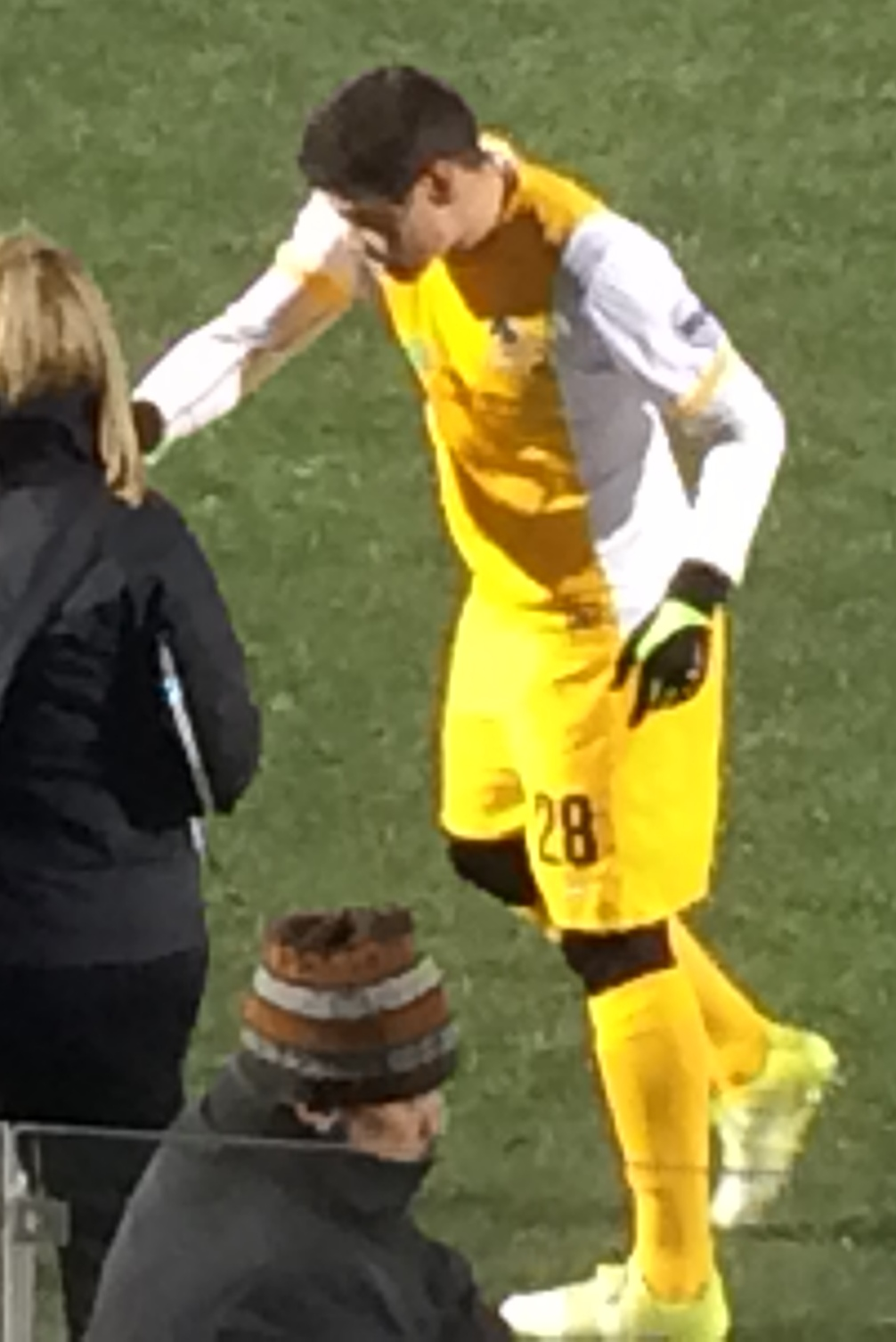
- Dantas on Riverhounds debut

Personal information
- Full name: Vinicius Helder dos Anjos Dantas
- Date of birth: 14 September 1989 (age 37)
- Place of birth: São Paulo, Brazil
- Height: 1.83 m (6 ft 0 in)
- Position: Striker

Team information
- Current team: Utica City

College career
Years	Team	Apps	(Gls)
2007–2010	Azusa Pacific Cougars		

Senior career*
Years	Team	Apps	(Gls)
2011–2012	Molde	6	(1)
2012	Bodø/Glimt	13	(6)
2013	Lahti	30	(6)
2014	Ottawa Fury	26	(2)
2014–2020	Baltimore Blast (indoor)	100	(136)
2015	Pittsburgh Riverhounds	16	(2)
2020–2021	Tacoma Stars (indoor)	14	(16)
2022	Baltimore Blast (indoor)	2	(3)
2022–2023	Florida Tropics (indoor)	19	(19)
2023–2024	Texas Outlaws (indoor)	18	(28)
2024–	Utica City (indoor)	0	(0)
- * Club domestic league appearances and goals as of October 16, 2024

Vinicius "Vini" Helder dos Anjos Dantas (born 14 September 1989) is a Brazilian football striker who plays for Utica City FC of the Major Arena Soccer League.

== Career ==
Dantas grew up in São Paulo in Brazil, predominantly playing futsal. He moved to the United States at age 18 to attend Azusa Pacific University on a football scholarship. In 2011, he was spotted by former Liverpool player Jason McAteer who took him to Tranmere Rovers, where he was offered a contract. However, he was not granted a work permit in England, and the contract could not be fulfilled.

In August 2011, he signed for the Norwegian club Molde FK, and on 17 September 2011 he made his Tippeligaen debut when he replaced Daniel Chima in the 65th minute against Fredrikstad FK. Dantas scored his first goal for Molde in the club's 3-1 victory over Sarpsborg 08 on 20 November 2011. Molde won the league title in his first season, qualifying for the 2012–13 UEFA Champions League in the process. Dantas made one appearance for Molde during its qualifying rounds, coming on as a 72nd-minute substitute against FK Ventspils on 24 July 2012. During the 2012 season, Dantas played only one match for Molde but played regularly for Molde's reserve team in the Second Division where he scored 15 goals in 12 matches in 2012. In total, Dantas made six first team league appearances for Molde, scoring one goal.

On 31 August 2012, Dantas joined the First Division side Bodø/Glimt of the Tippeligaen on a free transfer. Dantas stayed at the club for one season, scoring six goals in 13 matches. In March 2013, Dantas left Norway and signed a 1-year contract for Finnish team FC Lahti of the Veikkausliiga, the top flight of Finnish football.

In 2014, Dantas joined the Canadian club Ottawa Fury FC in the NASL, and made history by scoring the first-ever goal in franchise history. Dantas went on to score two goals for Ottawa in 26 matches during the 2014 season. However, it was announced on November 26, 2014 that he would not be resigned by the club. Following his release from Ottawa, Dantas began playing indoor soccer for the Baltimore Blast of the Major Arena Soccer League. Following the season, he was named a part of the All-Rookie Team after scoring 16 goals for the team and advancing to the championship series.

On March 16, 2015, Dantas signed with United Soccer League club Pittsburgh Riverhounds. Dantas debuted for the Riverhounds on 28 March 2015 in the club's opening match of the 2015 season, a 5-2 victory over the Harrisburg City Islanders. Dantas came on as a substitute for Miroslav Čabrilo at the start of the second half and provided an assist on Rob Vincent's second goal in the 90th minute. Dantas scored his first goal for the club on the third matchday of the season, the game-tying goal of a 1–1 draw with Saint Louis FC on 11 April 2015.

In March 2022, Dantas rejoined the Baltimore Blast.

On July 13, 2022, Dantas signed with Florida Tropics SC on a two-year deal.

Dantas joined Utica City FC in October 2024.

== Career statistics ==
As of 29 March 2015

Season	Club	League	League		Cup		Continental		Total	
Season	Club	League	Apps	Goals	Apps	Goals	Apps	Goals	Apps	Goals
2011	Molde	Tippeligaen	5	1	1	0	–		6	1
2012	Molde	Tippeligaen	1	0	2	1	–		3	1
2012	Bodø/Glimt	Adeccoligaen	13	6	0	0	–		13	6
2013	Lahti	Veikkausliiga	30	6	4	1	–		34	7
2014	Ottawa Fury	NASL	26	2	2	1	–		28	3
2015	Pittsburgh Riverhounds	USL	16	2	0	0	–		16	2
Career total			91	17	9	3	–		100	20

== Honours ==
Molde

- Tippeligaen: 2012
