= Baltimore Blast =

- Nickname: Blast
- Founded: 1992; 34 years ago (as Baltimore Spirit)
- Stadium: TU Arena
- Capacity: 3,580
- Chairman: Edwin F. Hale, Sr.
- Coach: David Bascome
- League: Major Arena Soccer League
- 2023–24: 5th, Eastern Division; Playoffs: DNQ
- Website: baltimoreblast.com
Home colors	Away colors

The Baltimore Blast are an American professional indoor soccer team based in the Baltimore metropolitan area, that competes in the Major Arena Soccer League (MASL).

Including one championship victory as the original Baltimore Blast, the team has won 10 championships since its founding in 1980. Since the 2017-2018 season, home games have been played at Towson University's TU Arena. The Blast previously played at CFG Bank Arena in downtown Baltimore. Team colors are red and gold. Their current head coach is David Bascome, who took over from Danny Kelly who held the position for 15 years.

== History ==
=== NPSL, MISL II and MISL III years ===
The team was founded by North Carolina–based software executive Bill Stealey as the Baltimore Spirit at the end of July 1992 and joined the National Professional Soccer League. The team replaced the earlier Baltimore Blast, who folded along with the original Major Indoor Soccer League. When the team was purchased by Ed Hale, a former owner of the original team, the Spirit were renamed the Blast on July 10, 1998 (Hale had the rights to the Blast name, hence the reason why the team decided to change its name) and joined the new MISL II in 2001. After the MISL II folded in 2008, the team announced it would be joining the new National Indoor Soccer League, which would later acquire the rights to, and became, the third version of the MISL.

=== Shift to MASL ===
One day after the 2013–2014 MISL Championship final, USL President Tim Holt announced a number of teams would not be returning to the MISL the following year. The franchise announced on April 2, 2014, that it would not return to the Major Indoor Soccer League (MISL) after its contract with the United Soccer Leagues (USL), owners of the circuit, expired following the 2013–14 season. It was officially announced the Blast would be one of six teams joining the Professional Arena Soccer League (later renamed the Major Arena Soccer League) in the 2014–2015 season.

In their first two seasons as a member of MASL, the Blast would win 33 out of 39 games. They placed first in the Eastern Division in both the 2014-2015 and 2015-2016 seasons, played in the 2015 and 2016 championship series and won the 2016 series over Soles de Sonora two games to none. The Blast repeated as Newman Cup Champions in 2017, again winning the final series over Soles de Sonora two games to one. In 2018, the Blast won their third straight championship, defeating the Monterrey Flash 4-3 in the final.

=== Attempted launch of the IPL ===
On February 18, 2016, Blast owner Ed Hale announced his intentions to leave the Major Arena Soccer League and form a new league.

On May 3, 2016, the expansion franchise Florida Tropics SC held a press conference stating they would be joining the IPL. At the press conference, Ed Hale was announced as the chairman of the league, and Sam Fantauzzo, former owner of the Rochester Lancers, was announced as the first commissioner of the league. It was announced that the St. Louis Ambush, Baltimore Blast, and Harrisburg Heat had "resigned" from the MASL.

On August 29, 2016, the Blast, Heat, Ambush re-entered the MASL with the expansion Tropics joining. The move effectively folded the IPL as no teams remained in the league.

After rejoining the MASL, the Blast would go on to win their second Eastern Division championship and MASL championship over Soles de Sonora for the second year in a row.

=== Move to SECU Arena ===
The Blast announced in August 2017 that they would move from the Royal Farms Arena to the SECU Arena on the campus of Towson University, beginning in the 2017-2018 MASL season. The move was the first time the Blast franchise played home games in an arena other than the Baltimore Arena. In June 2021 the Blast announced an affiliation partnership with Baltimore Kings, who will be playing their first arena soccer season in MASL 3 in January 2022. In March 2023, the Blast announced that the Rochester Lancers would be their affiliate in MASL 2

== Players ==
=== 2023–24 roster ===
==== Active players ====
- As of 2 April 2024

Note: Flags indicate national team as defined under FIFA eligibility rules; some limited exceptions apply. Players may hold more than one non-FIFA nationality.

No.	Pos.	Nation	Player
0	GK	USA	Zach Haussler
1	GK	USA	Quantrell James
2	DF	GUI	Oumar Sylla
4	DF/MF	USA	Erik Lorent
6	MF	USA	Josh Hughes
7	FW	BRA	Victor Parreiras
8	MF	USA	Jesus Pacheco
9	FW	USA	Moises Gonzalez
11	MF	USA	Tony Donatelli
12	DF	BRA	Adriano Dos Santos
13	DF	USA	Jereme Raley
14	DF/MF	USA	Ethan Watson
17	FW	USA	Jamie Thomas

No.	Pos.	Nation	Player
18	DF	USA	Brayden Wise
19	FW	BRA	Ricardo Diegues
20	DF	USA	Mike Deasel
21	FW	USA	Dom Alvarado
22	FW	BRA	Juan Pereira
24	GK	USA	Mike Zierhoffer
25	MF	USA	Jairo Guevara
27	FW	USA	Jack Shearer
33	FW	GHA	Ozzy Annang
42	DF	USA	Jack Schindler
70	MF	BRA	Richardinho Sobreira
88	DF	USA	Patrick Thompson
89	DF	USA	Joshio Sandoval

==== Inactive players ====
Note: Flags indicate national team as defined under FIFA eligibility rules; some limited exceptions apply. Players may hold more than one non-FIFA nationality.

No.	Pos.	Nation	Player
—	MF	USA	Jonathan Sousa
—			Rafa Santos
—	MF	JAM	Renan Pastre
—	FW	BRA	Victor France

No.	Pos.	Nation	Player
—	MF	JAM	Isamnia Cohen
23	MF	BRA	Jonatas Melo
31	FW	JAM	Kevaughn Frater

==== Staff ====
- (Bermuda) David Bascome – Head coach, (2020–present)
- (Brazil) Adauto Neto – Assistant coach
- (Brazil) Sergio Moura – Assistant coach

=== Retired numbers ===
Player	Number
Stan Stamenkovic	#10

=== Hall of Fame ===
Position	Person	Inducted
Coach	(England) Kenny Cooper	2004
FW	(Socialist Federal Republic of Yugoslavia) Stan Stamenkovic	2004
DF	(Socialist Federal Republic of Yugoslavia) Mike Stankovic	2004
DF	(United States) Bruce Savage	2005
N/A	(United States) Earl Foreman	2005
FW	(United States) Tim Wittman	2005
FW	(United States) Joey Fink	2006
FW	(United States) Dave MacWilliams	2006
FW	(Germany) Heinz Wirtz	2007
FW	(Canada) Domenic Mobilio	2008
GK	(United States) Keith Van Eron	2008
FW	(England) Billy Ronson	2009
DF	(Trinidad and Tobago) Richard Chinapoo	2009
FW	(Canada) Pat Ercoli	2010
GK	(Puerto Rico) Cris Vaccaro	2010
DF	(United States) Doug Neely	2011
FW	(United States) Dan Counce	2012
DF	(United States) Rusty Troy	2012
FW	(United States) Tarik Walker	2013
MF	(Brazil) Denison Cabral	2014
DF	(United States) Lance Johnson	2015
MF/Coach	(United States) Danny Kelly	2017
GK	(Brazil) Sagu	2018
DF	(United States) PJ Wakefield	2019
FW	(United States) Giuliano Celenza	2019
MF	(United States) Lee Tschantret	2020
FW/Coach	(Bermuda) David Bascome	2020
Trainer	(United States) Marty McGinty	2020

=== Notable former players ===
- (Brazil) Denison Cabral
- (United States) Jason Dieter
- (Ivory Coast) Levi Houapeu
- (United States) Jason Maricle
- (Scotland) Tony McPeak
- (United States) Tino Nuñez
- (England) Onua Obasi
- (United States) Rusty Troy
- (United States) Barry Stitz
- (United States) PJ Wakefield
- (United States) Tarik Walker

== Year-by-year ==
Year	League	GP	W	L	Win%	GF	GA	GF/G	GA/G	Finish	Playoffs	GP	W	L	Win%	Avg. attendance
1992–93	NPSL II	40	27	13	.675	309	256	7.73	6.40	1st American	Quarterfinal	2	0	2	.000	5,444
1993–94	NPSL II	40	26	14	.650	322	293	8.05	7.33	1st American	First Round	2	0	2	.000	6,471
1994–95	NPSL II	40	23	17	.575	317	307	7.93	7.68	3rd American	First Round	3	1	2	.333	5,733
1995–96	NPSL II	40	25	15	.625	306	258	7.65	6.45	2nd American	Division Semifinal	6	3	3	.500	5,037
1996–97	NPSL II	40	20	20	.500	260	258	6.50	6.45	2nd East	Conference Semifinal	5	3	2	.600	4,760
1997–98	NPSL II	40	12	28	.300	250	300	6.25	7.50	3rd East	DNQ	—N/a	—N/a	—N/a	—N/a	5,001
1998–99	NPSL II	40	19	21	.475	271	290	6.78	7.25	3rd East	DNQ	—N/a	—N/a	—N/a	—N/a	4,795
1999–2000	NPSL II	44	26	18	.591	339	275	7.70	6.25	1st East	Conference Final	4	2	2	.500	5,445
2000–01	NPSL II	40	22	18	.550	300	260	7.50	6.50	3rd American	Conference Final	5	3	2	.600	5,376
2001–02	MISL II	44	18	26	.409	265	274	6.02	6.23	4th MISL	Semifinal	1	0	1	.000	4,998
2002–03	MISL II	36	18	18	.500	189	182	5.25	5.06	3rd Eastern	Champions	5	4	1	.800	5,559
2003–04	MISL II	36	25	11	.694	241	192	6.69	5.33	1st Eastern	Champions	4	4	0	1.000	6,330
2004–05	MISL II	39	15	24	.385	205	238	5.26	6.10	7th MISL	DNQ	—N/a	—N/a	—N/a	—N/a	5,752
2005–06	MISL II	30	17	13	.567	184	168	6.13	5.60	2nd MISL	Champions	6	4	2	.667	7,005
2006–07	MISL II	30	15	15	.500	154	150	5.13	5.00	5th MISL	DNQ	—N/a	—N/a	—N/a	—N/a	7,449
2007–08	MISL II	30	19	11	.633	186	135	6.20	4.50	3rd MISL	Champions	5	5	0	1.000	7,230
2008–09	NISL	18	14	4	.778	132	66	7.33	3.67	1st NISL	Champions	1	1	0	1.000	7,534
2009–10	MISL III	20	11	9	.550	105	97	5.25	4.85	2nd MISL	Semifinal	2	0	2	.000	6,259
2010–11	MISL III	20	15	5	.750	131	93	6.55	4.65	1st MISL	Runner-up	1	0	1	.000	6,933
2011–12	MISL III	24	18	6	.750	165	108	6.88	4.50	1st Eastern	Runner-up	4	2	2	.500	5,961
2012–13	MISL III	26	21	5	.808	181	108	6.96	4.15	1st MISL	Champions	4	4	0	1.000	5,544
2013–14	MISL III	20	17	3	.850	147	46	7.35	2.30	1st MISL	Runner-up	6	3	3	.500	6,123
2014–15	MASL	20	18	2	.900	167	69	8.35	3.45	1st Eastern	Runner-up	6	4	2	.667	6,201
2015–16	MASL	19	15	4	.789	129	57	6.79	3.00	1st Eastern	Champions	6	6	0	1.000	6,102
2016–17	MASL	20	14	6	.700	113	69	5.65	3.45	1st Eastern	Champions	9	6	3	.667	6,299
2017–18	MASL	22	17	5	.773	143	108	6.50	4.91	1st Eastern	Champions	4	4	0	1.000	3,491
2018–19	MASL	24	17	7	.708	144	103	6.00	4.29	2nd Eastern	Semifinal	4	2	2	.500	3,317
2019–20	MASL	23	15	8	.652	175	104	7.61	4.52	4th Eastern	Play-off cancelled	—N/a	—N/a	—N/a	—N/a	2,641
2021	MASL	did not participate														
2021–22	MASL	21	12	9	.571	142	111	6.76	5.29	2nd Eastern	Quarterfinal	3	1	2	.333	2,183
2022–23	MASL	24	13	11	.542	141	101	5.88	4.21	2nd Eastern	Runner-up	7	4	3	.571	2,778*
2023–24	MASL	24	13	11	.458	140	154	5.83	6.42	5th Eastern	DNQ	—N/a	—N/a	—N/a	—N/a	1,780
2024–25	MASL	24	16	8	.667	167	123	6.96	5.13	3rd MASL	Semifinal	2	1	1	.500	1,570
2025–26	MASL	24	14	10	.583	164	141	6.83	5.88	2nd MASL	Semifinal	3	1	2	.333	1,564
Total		982	587	395	.598	6,584	5,494	6.70	5.59		9 Championships	110	68	42	.626	–
*Attendance average excludes one 15 minute mini match played directly after their quarter-final matchup.

== Records ==
Statistics below show the all-time regular-season club leaders and include player statistics from the original Baltimore Blast which competed in the Major Indoor Soccer League (1978–1992). Bold indicates active Blast players.

Category	Record holder	Total
Games	(United States) Tim Wittman	441
Goals	(Brazil) Denison Cabral	445
Assists	(Socialist Federal Republic of Yugoslavia) Srboljub Stamenković	199
Game-winning goals	(Brazil) Denison Cabral	32
Blocks	(United States) Lance Johnson	694
Shutouts	(Brazil) **William Vanzela**	11
Wins	(Brazil) **William Vanzela**	105

== Head coaches ==
- (England) Kenny Cooper Sr. (1992–1994)
- (United States) Dave MacWilliams (1994–1996)
- (United States) Mike Stankovic (1996–1998)
- (United States) Kevin Healey (1998–2002)
- (United States) Sean Bowers (2002)
- (England) Bobby McAvan (2002–2003)
- (United States) Tim Wittman (2003–2006)
- (United States) Danny Kelly (2006–2020)
- (Bermuda) David Bascome (2020–present)

== Arenas ==
- Royal Farms Arena; Baltimore, Maryland (1992–2017) (previously known as Baltimore Civic Center, Baltimore Arena, 1st Mariner Arena)
- SECU Arena; Towson, Maryland (2017–present)
