= Danny Kelly (soccer) =

American soccer player and coach

Personal information
- Date of birth: March 7, 1969 (age 57)
- Place of birth: Bronx, New York, United States
- Height: 5 ft 9 in (1.75 m)
- Position: Midfielder

College career
Years	Team	Apps	(Gls)
1987–1990	Penn State Nittany Lions		

Senior career*
Years	Team	Apps	(Gls)
1991–1999	Harrisburg Heat (indoor)	179	(224)
1993	San Diego Sockers (indoor)	23	(14)
1996	Rochester Rhinos	20	(2)
1997–1998	Hershey Wildcats	37	(5)
1999–2006	Baltimore Blast (indoor)	220	(106)

International career
- U.S. Futsal

Managerial career
- 2006–2020: Baltimore Blast
- * Club domestic league appearances and goals

Danny Kelly (born March 7, 1969) is a former midfielder and coach.

== Player ==
=== Youth ===
Kelly played in the Blau-Weiss Gottschee youth system. He then played college soccer at Penn State University in State College, Pennsylvania. While at Penn State he was a four-year letter winner from 1987 to 1990. He earned national recognition and honors during his college career. He still holds Penn State records, including one for single season assists.

=== Professional ===
On February 14, 1991, the Kansas City Comets selected Kelly in the third round of the Major Soccer League draft. He did not sign with the Comets, but began his professional career when he signed as the first-ever draft choice the Harrisburg Heat of the National Professional Soccer League on October 19, 1991. In 1995, the Heat finished runner-up in the NPSL Championship Series. In 1996, he played for the Rochester Rhinos of the A-League as they finished runner-up to the Seattle Sounders. In 1997, he joined the Hershey Wildcats of the USISL. He would also play the 1998 outdoor season with the Wildcats. On September 11, 1998, the Heat traded Kelly to the Baltimore Blast in exchange for Michael Henning and cash. Kelly finished his seven seasons with the Heat in fifth place on the team's all-time points list despite missing large parts of several seasons with injuries. In eight seasons in Baltimore he compiled more than 200 points and ranks sixth on the team's all-time scoring list. In 2001, the Blast moved to the newly created Major Indoor Soccer League. A three-time League All-Star, Kelly represented the Blast in the 2006 MISL All-Star Game and leads the team's defenders that season in points. Kelly also ranks 20th on the League's all-time scoring list. The current Harrisburg Heat retired Kelly's number during a halftime ceremony on December 8, 2012.

=== International ===
Kelly played for the United States national futsal team.

== Coach ==
In 2006, Kelly was hired as the head coach of the Baltimore Blast of the Major Indoor Soccer League. He was named interim player-coach after his predecessor Tim Wittman was suspended by the league for assaulting a referee. Kelly won the 2008-2009 National Indoor Soccer League Coach of the Year. He led the Blast team to 7 Championship titles.

On 28 May 2020, the Blast announced that Kelly had "moved on" and that his assistant David Bascome would be taking over as head coach.
