= Tony Donatelli =

American soccer player

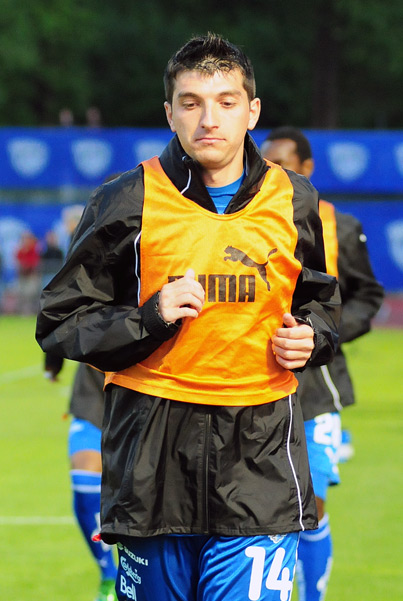

Personal information
- Full name: Anthony Donatelli
- Date of birth: June 7, 1984 (age 42)
- Place of birth: Glenside, Pennsylvania, United States
- Height: 6 ft 1 in (1.85 m)
- Position: Midfielder

Team information
- Current team: Baltimore Blast
- Number: 11

College career
Years	Team	Apps	(Gls)
2002–2005	Temple Owls		

Senior career*
Years	Team	Apps	(Gls)
2004–2005	Ocean City Barons	34	(14)
2006–2008	Vancouver Whitecaps	61	(6)
2006–2008	Philadelphia KiXX (indoor)	59	(37)
2008–2010	Montreal Impact	73	(13)
2008	→Trois-Rivières Attak (loan)	1	(0)
2011	Rochester Rhinos	23	(3)
2012	Charleston Battery	20	(3)
2012–	Baltimore Blast (indoor)	188	(173)
2013	VSI Tampa Bay FC	26	(2)
2014	Ottawa Fury	26	(4)
2015	Harrisburg City Islanders	3	(0)

International career
	United States national futsal team	2	(0)
- * Club domestic league appearances and goals as of December 17, 2022

Anthony Donatelli (born June 7, 1984, in Glenside, Pennsylvania) is an American soccer player who plays as a midfielder for the Baltimore Blast of the Major Arena Soccer League.

== Career ==
=== Youth and college ===
Donatelli played for Hunter Soccer Club as a child before playing college soccer at Temple University from 2002 to 2005, and with the Ocean City Barons in the USL Premier Development League. In 2005, he was named to the PDL All-Eastern Conference Team after finishing second in Barons scoring with ten goals and six assists in sixteen games played. Tony played youth soccer for The Philadelphia soccer club, FC Coppa.

=== Professional ===
Donatelli was drafted in the third round of the 2006 MLS Supplemental Draft by Houston Dynamo, but was not offered a contract by the team. He signed instead with the Vancouver Whitecaps in the USL First Division, and scored two goals and two assists in twenty-four games played in his debut season. In the 2006 playoffs, Donatelli made a significant impact, scoring three times in four games including a goal in Vancouver's 3–0 win over the Rochester Rhinos in the USL Division One Championship game.

On June 10, 2008, Donatelli was traded to Montreal Impact for Charles Gbeke. On October 20, 2008, Donatelli accepted a two-year extension deal. During the 2008 season he was loaned for a match to the Impact's farm team Trois-Rivières Attak in the Canadian Soccer League. During the 2009 USL season Donatelli contributed by helping the Impact clinch a playoff spot under new head coach Marc Dos Santos. He recorded his first playoff goal in the quarterfinal match against Charleston Battery in the second match of the aggregate series. The match concluded in a 2–1 victory for the Impact, which resulted in 4–1 victory on aggregate allowing the Impact to advance to the semifinals. He scored his second playoff goal against the Puerto Rico Islanders where match resulted in 2–1 victory for the Impact, and allowing the Impact to advance to the finals by winning their second match on aggregate. Montreal would advance on to the finals where their opponents would end up being the Vancouver Whitecaps FC, thus marking the first time in USL history where the final match would consist of two Canadian clubs. On October 17, 2009, in the second game of finals Donatelli scored the opening goal on a penalty kick in a 3–1 victory, therefore winning the match and claiming Montreal's third USL Championship.

Donatelli signed with San Jose Earthquakes on January 28, 2011. He trained with the club for one month before being waived on March 1, 2011, prior to the start of the MLS season. He subsequently signed with USL Pro club Rochester Rhinos on March 18, 2011.

Donatelli moved to fellow USL Pro team Charleston Battery on March 27, 2012, and helped the club win the USL Pro League title.

After the 2012 outdoor season, Donatelli returned to the indoor game where he signed with the Baltimore Blast of the Major Indoor Soccer League. He would help them win the 2012/13 MISL title and over the next three years, Donatelli played both indoor and outdoor soccer, before focusing solely on the indoor game starting in the 2015/16 campaign. During his time with the Blast, he helped them win three straight Major Arena Soccer League championships from 2015 - 2018.

In 2016, Donatelli earned his first cap with the U.S. Futsal National Team in a 4–4 draw against Canada in the 2016 CONCACAF Futsal Championship.

== Honors ==
Baltimore Blast

- Major Indoor Soccer League Championship: 2012/13
- Major Arena Soccer League Championship: 2015/16, 2016/17, 2017/18

Charleston Battery

- USL Pro League Championship: 2012

Montreal Impact

- USL First Division Championship: 2009

Philadelphia Kixx

- Major Indoor Soccer League Championship: 2007

Vancouver Whitecaps

- USL First Division Championship: 2006

== Career stats ==
Team	Season	League	Domestic League			Domestic Playoffs			Domestic Cup^{1}			Concacaf Competition^{2}			Total		
Team	Season	League	Apps	Goals	Assists	Apps	Goals	Assists	Apps	Goals	Assists	Apps	Goals	Assists	Apps	Goals	Assists
South Jersey Barons	2004	PDL	18	4	0	-	-	-	2	0	0	-	-	-	20	4	0
Ocean City Barons	2005	PDL	16	10	6	-	-	-	3	3	0	-	-	-	19	13	6
Vancouver Whitecaps FC	2006	USL-1	24	2	2	5	3	1	-	-	-	-	-	-	29	5	3
Vancouver Whitecaps FC	2007	USL-1	27	4	2	2	0	0	-	-	-	-	-	-	39	4	2
Vancouver Whitecaps FC	2008	USL-1	10	0	1	-	-	-	1	0	0	-	-	-	11	0	1
Trois-Rivières Attak	2008	CSL	1	0	0	-	-	-	-	-	-	-	-	-	1	0	0
Montreal Impact	2008	USL-1	16	4	1	4	0	0	-	-	-	8	3	0	28	7	1
Montreal Impact	2009	USL-1	27	2	3	4	2	0	2	1	0	-	-	-	33	5	3
Montreal Impact	2010	USSF D2	30	7	3	4	0	0	4	0	1	-	-	-	38	7	4
		Total CSL	1	0	0	–	–	–	–	–	–	–	–	–	1	0	0
		Total PDL	16	10	6	–	–	–	5	3	0	–	–	–	21	13	6
		Total USSF D2	134	19	12	19	5	1	7	1	1	8	3	0	168	28	14
