= William Vanzela =

Brazilian-born Italian footballer

Personal information
- Date of birth: March 1, 1985 (age 41)
- Place of birth: Cascavel, Brazil
- Position: Goalkeeper

Team information
- Current team: Empire Strykers
- Number: 13

Senior career*
Years	Team	Apps	(Gls)
- Paraná Clube
2012–2020	Baltimore Blast (indoor)	147	(2)
2013	Lazio (7v7)		
2021	San Diego Sockers (indoor)	5	(0)
2021–2023	Baltimore Blast (indoor)	33	(1)
2023–	Empire Strykers (indoor)	0	(0)

International career
- Italy (7v7)

Managerial career
- 2015–: Johns Hopkins Blue Jays (assistant)
- 2017–2018: Johns Hopkins Blue Jays (women's goalkeeping)
- * Club domestic league appearances and goals as of November 27, 2024

William Vanzela is a Brazil-born Italian goalkeeper who has been a long term goalkeeper of Baltimore Blast at Major Arena Soccer League. He has also played in Paraná Clube prior to joining the Blast. He was selected to represent Italy in the FIF7 Mundialito 2011 held in Brazil where they won the Championship. He was also awarded the best goalkeeper for 2 consecutive season in FIF7 from 2011-2012 and in 2013 he join Lazio (7v7) club and play in FIF7 World Club Championship.

In 2024, Vanzela filed a lawsuit against the Baltimore Blast and its owner, alleging that the team falsely accused him in multiple public statements of being involved in nefarious and criminal activity to damage his reputation. He also alleged that the team wrongly withheld his salary. The Baltimore Blast countersued, claiming that the team's former general manager provided Vanzela with at least $15,000 in unauthorized payments. In November 2026, Vanzela and the Baltimore Blast reached a framework to settle both lawsuits.
