= Dino Delevski =

Macedonian footballer (born 1976)

Personal information
- Date of birth: 20 August 1976 (age 50)
- Place of birth: Skopje, Yugoslavia
- Height: 6 ft 3/4 in (1.85 m)
- Position: Forward

College career
Years	Team	Apps	(Gls)
1996–1999	Oklahoma City Stars		

Senior career*
Years	Team	Apps	(Gls)
1999–2001	Wichita Wings (indoor)	52	(68)
2001–2005	Kansas City Comets (indoor)	136	(213)
2003	Milwaukee Wave United	23	(8)
2006–2007	Philadelphia KiXX (indoor)	34	(15)
2007–2008	Monterrey La Raza	28	(44)
2008–2009	Rockford Rampage	6	(5)
2009	Milwaukee Wave (indoor)	7	(5)
Total		286	(358)
- * Club domestic league appearances and goals

Dino Delevski (born in Skopje, SR Macedonia, SFR Yugoslavia) is an American soccer player of Macedonian descent.

== Club career ==
In 1996, Delevski graduated from Capitol Hill High School. He was a 1996 All State High School soccer player at Capitol Hill. He attended Oklahoma City University where he was a 1999 Second Team NAIA All American soccer player. On 25 January 2000, Delevski signed with the Wichita Wings of the National Professional Soccer League. During the 2000-2001 (final) season of the league, he made the National Conference team for the 2001 NPSL All-Star Game, held in Buffalo, New York (then home of the Buffalo Blizzard). On 20 August 2001, the Kansas City Comets selected Delevski in the first round of the dispersal draft. Delevski signed with the Comets. He was selected as 2002 and 2003 NPSL MVP. During this time in Kansas City, Delevski started his youth coaching career in Kearney, Missouri. Delevski also was named the All-Star Game MVP in 2003, scoring a Hattrick during his exciting performance. In 2003, he played outdoors with the Milwaukee Wave United of the A-League. That year, he also became an American citizen. On 22 September 2005, the Philadelphia KiXX selected Delevski in the Dispersal Draft. Delevski did not sign with the KiXX until 16 February 2006. He had stayed with the KiXX for the 2007-2008 MISL II season with fellow Macedonian Sandre Naumoski. Delevski was a valuable contributor to that team winning his first championship as the Philadelphia KiXX defeated the Detroit Ignition 13–8 to win the 2007 Major Indoor Soccer League title at Compuware Arena. Delevski then he would be traded to the Monterrey La Raza early in the season, where he immediately emerged as one of the League's leading scorers and leaders of the team. In 2008, Delevski joined the Rockford Rampage of the National Indoor Soccer League. On 25 February 2009, the Rampage released Delevski. A week later, he signed with the Xtreme Soccer League which assigned him to the Milwaukee Wave. Delevski is currently a coach for the Chicago Inferno of the MASL.

== Honors ==
- 1996 Oklahoma High School All State
- 1999 Second Team NAIA All American
- MISL MVP
  - 2002, 2003
- First Team All MISL
  - 2002, 2003, 2008
- Second Team All MISL
  - 2004, 2005
