= Cable Dahmer Arena =

Indoor arena in Independence, Missouri, U.S.

Coordinates: 39.039128°N 94.357560°W

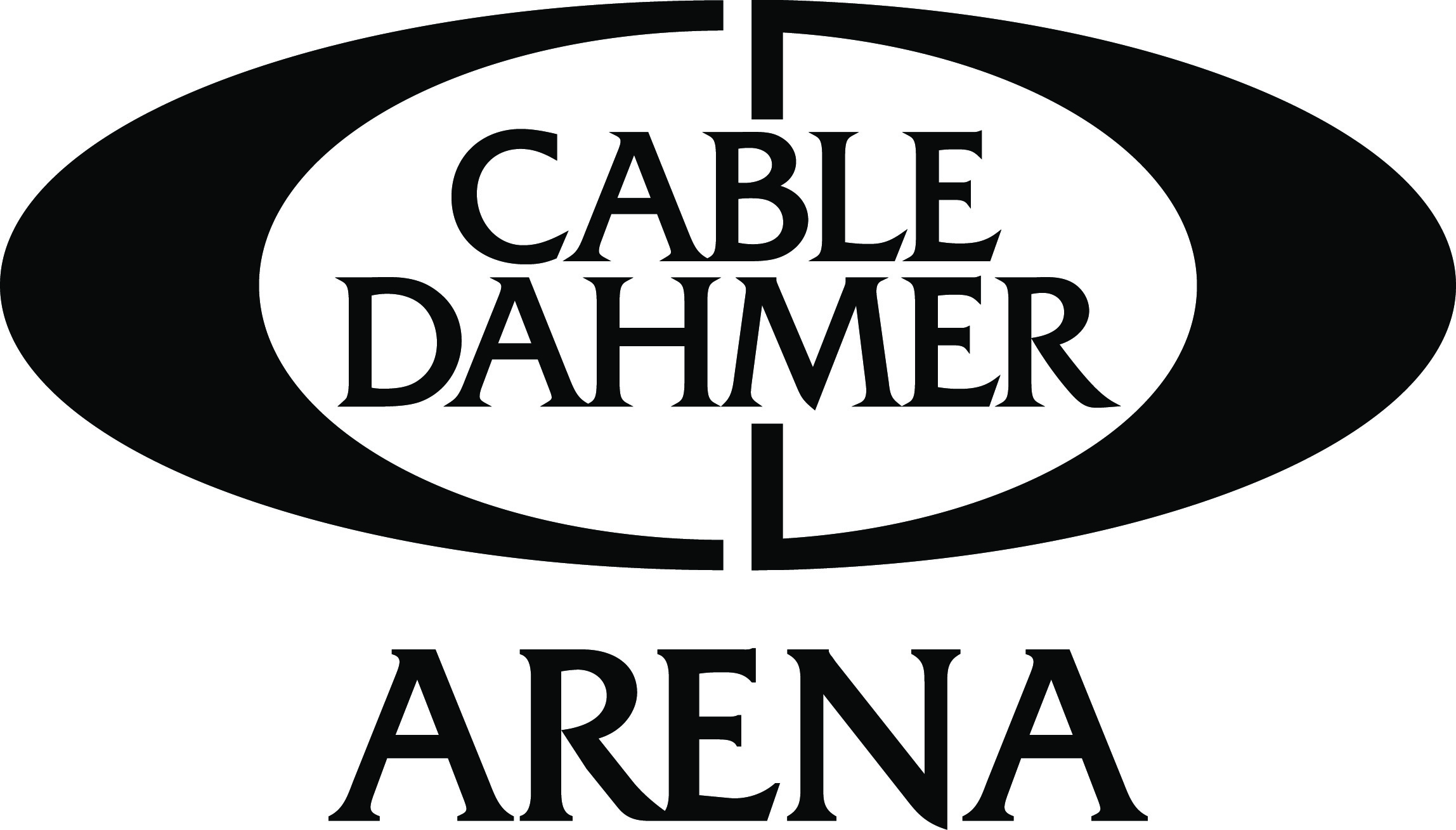

- Location within Missouri Location within the United States
- Former names: Independence Events Center (2009–15); Silverstein Eye Centers Arena (2015–20)
- Address: 19100 East Valley View Parkway
- Location: Independence, Missouri, U.S.
- Owner: City of Independence
- Operator: Global Spectrum
- Capacity: Ice hockey: 5,800 fixed seats Up to 7,000 seats for concerts and special events

Construction
- Groundbreaking: September 17, 2008
- Opened: November 7, 2009
- Cost: $60 million ($90 million in 2025 dollars)
- Architect: Sink Combs Dethlefs
- Project manager: Benham Construction
- Structural engineers: Martin/Martin, Inc.
- General contractor: J.E. Dunn Construction Group

Tenants
- Missouri/Kansas City Mavericks (CHL/ECHL) (2009–present); Kansas City Comets (MASL) (2010–present); Kansas City Phantoms (CIF) (2017–2018); Kansas Jayhawks (ACHA); Kansas City Force (X League) (2022)

Website
- cabledahmerarena.com

Cable Dahmer Arena (formerly, Silverstein Eye Centers Arena and Independence Events Center) is a 5,800-seat multi-purpose indoor arena in Independence, Missouri, United States. It was opened in November 2009. It serves as the home arena and administrative offices for Kansas City Mavericks in the ECHL, as well as hosts the home games of the Kansas City Comets of the Major Arena Soccer League. The arena hosts more than 100 events every year, with a very large spectrum of its events including: trade shows, professional sporting events, festivals, community events, concerts and its primary tenant, Kansas City Mavericks.

The arena which is owned by the city of Independence is just southeast of the Interstate 70/Interstate 470 interchange. The privately owned Independence Center shopping center is just north of it across Interstate 70.

== Features ==
- Community Ice Rink (2nd Sheet of Ice) located within the Events Center
- 2 8' 3-13/16" Tall x 35' 4-5/16" Wide Daktronics sidewall video boards at 6mm pixel density
- 2 12'5" Tall x 71'9" Wide Daktronics endwall video boards at 6mm pixel density
- More video board pixels than the T-Mobile Center
- 360° LED ribbon board (used as scorebars under each video wall)
- 200 VIP style loge seats
- 8 Visiting locker rooms
- 29 luxury suites
- 4 full service concession stands
- 7 full service box office windows

== Events ==
The arena has hosted many artists including Ariana Grande (who kicked off her major world tour here), Bruno Mars, Alan Jackson, and many more. On February 26, 2020, the arena hosted an episode of AEW Dynamite. Another episode was filmed at the arena on November 3, 2021. The arena hosted All Elite Wrestling's Title Tuesday event on October 10, 2023.

== NHL hockey ==
The St. Louis Blues played a home exhibition pre-season game against the Chicago Blackhawks on October 2, 2021. The Blues returned to Cable Dahmer Arena on October 1, 2022, taking on the Dallas Stars, and again on September 30, 2023 for another matchup against the Stars.
