= David Bascome =

Bermudian footballer

David Bascome MBE
Personal information
- Full name: David Scott Bascome
- Date of birth: 29 January 1970 (age 56)
- Place of birth: Smiths, Bermuda
- Height: 5 ft 10 in (1.78 m)
- Position: Forward

Senior career*
Years	Team	Apps	(Gls)
1987–1990	North Village Rams		
1991, 1993–2000	Harrisburg Heat (indoor)	200	(183)
1992	Denver Thunder (indoor)	10	(3)
2003–2008	Baltimore Blast (indoor)	117	(81)
2004	Harrisburg City Islanders	2	(0)

International career
1992–2000	Bermuda	9	(0)

Managerial career
- 2006–2020: Baltimore Blast (assistant)
- 2020–: Baltimore Blast
- * Club domestic league appearances and goals

David Bascome MBE (born 29 January 1970) is a retired association football forward who is currently the head coach of the Baltimore Blast in the Major Arena Soccer League.

== Club career ==
David Bascome started his First Division soccer career at the age of 16 with North Village Rams in Bermuda. At 20 years of age, he signed his first professional contract with the Harrisburg Heat of the National Professional Soccer League, USA. After 12 seasons of professional indoor soccer, Bascome won his first Championship during his 2003–2004 campaign with the Baltimore Blast, then won 7 more 3 as a player and 4 as an assistant coach.

After retiring, he was named to the assistant coaching position of the Blast on 12 October 2006, and helped lead the team to the 2008 MISL Championship in his second season on the coaching staff.

The modern Harrisburg Heat of the Professional Arena Soccer League retired Bascome's #40 jersey in a halftime ceremony during the 29 December 2012, game. Bascome played with the original Harrisburg Heat in 1991 and from 1993 through 2000.

Bascome served as Baltimore Blast assistant coach beginning in 2006. On 28 May 2020, he was promoted to head coach. Earlier in 2020, David's brother Andrew Bascome was named head coach of USL League Two's FC Bascome Bermuda.

== International career ==
Bascome made his debut for Bermuda in a February 1992 friendly match against Norway and he has earned a total of 12 caps, scoring 2 goals. He has represented his country in 5 FIFA World Cup qualification matches.

His final international match was a March 2000 World Cup qualification match against the British Virgin Islands.

== Personal life ==
Bascome was appointed a Member of the Order of the British Empire (MBE) in the 2003 Birthday Honours for services to sport and young people in Bermuda.

In 2016, Bascome and his brother Andrew Bascome revealed they had been sexually abused early in their football careers, with Andrew stating the abuse "went on for years."
