= Major Indoor Soccer League (2001–2008) =

Defunct soccer league in the United States (2001–2008)

- Sport: Indoor soccer
- Founded: 2001
- Folded: 2008
- Countries: United States and Mexico
- Last champion: Baltimore Blast
- Broadcaster: Fox Soccer Channel

The Major Indoor Soccer League (MISL) was the top professional indoor soccer league in the United States. The league was a member of the United States Soccer Federation. The MISL had replaced the NPSL which folded in 2001. According to MISL.net, the league ceased operations as of May 31, 2008. "We are considering structural changes that will bring us greater efficiencies, while also allowing long term growth and expansion of the League", said John Hantz, former Chairman of the MISL, and Owner/Operator of the Detroit Ignition. All the teams from MISL went to the new indoor leagues: NISL, MASL and the XSL. The NISL and XSL used the same playing rules as the MISL.

== History ==
In the summer of 2001, the National Professional Soccer League disbanded. The six surviving teams organized the MISL as a single-entity structure similar to Major League Soccer. In 2002, the MISL absorbed two teams from the World Indoor Soccer League: the Dallas Sidekicks and San Diego Sockers. The St. Louis Steamers, another former WISL team, joined the league the following year. On May 27, 2008, Commissioner Steve Ryan stepped down as the commissioner of the MISL, and then on June 2, 2008, the Management Committee of the MISL announced they had ceased operations effective May 31, 2008 to reform the league. Following the league's dissolution, all MISL's teams from its final season joined either the National Indoor Soccer League, Professional Arena Soccer League, or the Xtreme Soccer League.

== Organization ==
The MISL was organized in a single table playing a 30-game schedule. Traditionally, the season began in October and ended in March. The league also conducted an All-Star Game at midseason. It pitted Eastern teams against Western teams and USA All-Stars against World All-Stars as well as the MISL All-Stars against a Mexican team. No All-Star Game was played in the 2004–2005 and 2006–2007 seasons. The All-Star game scheduled for the 2007–08 season in Stockton, California was also canceled.

The top six teams qualified for the playoffs, which began in April. In the first round, the sixth place team played the third place team while the fourth and fifth place teams also played either other. The top two teams received a bye in the first round. The survivors of the first round played the top two seeds in the semifinals with the first place team playing the lowest surviving seed from the first round and the second place team playing the highest surviving seed. The two semi-final winners met in the MISL Championship Final. The first two rounds were a two-game series with a golden goal tie breaker. The Championship Final was a single game at a predetermined neutral site.

== Television ==
The MISL had a relative lack of television coverage for being a national professional sports league. In February 2007, the league and Versus announced a partnership to deliver a nationally televised game of the week starting in March 2007. For the 2006–2007 season, Versus broadcast two regular season games, a MISL Championship Series Semifinal game on April 14, and the MISL Championship Series Final. Additionally, the MISL produced its first-ever live magazine show to preview the 2007 MISL Championship Series. Before the 2006–2007 season, national television coverage was limited to the MISL Championships in 2005 and 2006, which were shown on ESPN2.

For the 2007–08, the MISL signed an agreement with Fox Soccer Channel to televise 20 games that season.

In addition to national television, certain games were shown in local markets over local cable networks like CN8.

== MISL teams ==
Team	City/Area	Arena
Baltimore Blast	Baltimore	1st Mariner Arena
California Cougars	Stockton, California	Stockton Arena
Chicago Storm	Hoffman Estates, Illinois (Chicago area)	UIC Pavilion/Sears Centre
Cleveland Force/Crunch	Cleveland, Ohio	Wolstein Center
Dallas Sidekicks	Dallas	Reunion Arena
Detroit Ignition	Plymouth Township, Michigan (Detroit area)	Compuware Arena
Harrisburg Heat	Harrisburg, Pennsylvania	Pennsylvania Farm Show Complex & Expo Center
Kansas City Comets	Kansas City, Missouri	Kemper Arena
Milwaukee Wave	Milwaukee	U.S. Cellular Arena
Monterrey Fury/Tigres	Monterrey, Mexico	Arena Monterrey
Monterrey La Raza	Monterrey, Mexico	Arena Monterrey
New Jersey Ironmen	Newark, New Jersey	Prudential Center
Orlando Sharks	Orlando, Florida	Amway Arena
Philadelphia KiXX	Philadelphia	Wachovia Spectrum
St. Louis Steamers	St. Louis	Family Arena/Savvis Center
San Diego Sockers	San Diego	San Diego Sports Arena

== MISL Championship ==
=== Championship series ===
Season	Date(s)	Champion	Series	Runner-up	Host
2001–02	April 26, 27 & May 3	Philadelphia KiXX	2-1	Milwaukee Wave	Milwaukee/Philadelphia
2002–03	April 12, 13 & 18	Baltimore Blast	2-1	Milwaukee Wave	Baltimore/Milwaukee
2003–04	April 23, 24 & May 1	Baltimore Blast	3-0	Milwaukee Wave	Baltimore/Milwaukee
2004–05	May 14 & 21	Milwaukee Wave	2-0	Cleveland Force	Milwaukee/St. Louis
2005–06	April 28 & 30	Baltimore Blast	2-1	St. Louis Steamers	Baltimore/St. Louis
2006–07	April 21	Philadelphia KiXX	1-0	Detroit Ignition	Detroit
2007–08	April 25	Baltimore Blast	1-0	Monterrey La Raza	Milwaukee

=== Championship formats ===
Series	Years
Single game	2006–07, 2007–08
Two game plus golden goal series	2004–05, 2005–06
Best-of-three series	2001–02, 2002–03
Best-of-five series	2003–04

=== MISL Championships Won ===
Team	Championships	Winning years
Baltimore Blast	4	2002–03, 2003–04, 2005–06, 2007–08
Philadelphia KiXX	2	2001–02, 2006–07
Milwaukee Wave	1	2004–05

== MISL All-Star Game ==
Season	Date	Winner	Score	Loser	MVP	Host	Attendance	Notes
2001–02	2/17/2002	East All-Stars	17-15(OT)	West All-Stars	Joel Shanker	Cleveland	13,216	
2002–03	3/9/2003	West All-Stars	20-13	East All-Stars	Dino Delevski	Milwaukee	8,429	Tatu's final All-Star game as a player
2003–04	2/29/2004	Team USA	10-1	Team International	Giuliano Celenza	St. Louis	4,129	
2004–05	N/A	N/A	N/A	N/A	N/A	N/A	N/A	No game scheduled
2005–06	2/11/2006	MISL All-Stars	9-5	Mexican National Indoor Team	Todd Dusosky	Milwaukee	8,671	
2006–07	N/A	N/A	N/A	N/A	N/A	Stockton	N/A	Replaced by several games between a Mexican All-Star team and individual MISL clubs
2007–08	N/A	N/A	N/A	N/A	N/A	Stockton	N/A	Game canceled

== Rules ==
The MISL game was the standard North American version of indoor soccer. It was different from the FIFA-sanctioned futsal.

Each MISL game consisted of four 15-minute quarters. There were breaks between the first two and the last two quarters. There was also a 15-minute halftime. Ties resulted in consecutive 15-minute sudden death overtimes.

An MISL field was roughly the size of an ice hockey rink, measuring 200 feet by 80 feet. Goals measured 14 feet by 8 feet and are set into the boards. Players were allowed to bounce the ball off the dasher boards. Play stopped if the ball leaves the field of play.

During an MISL game, each team was allowed to have 6 players on the field at a time. One player was the goalkeeper who handled the ball while in the penalty arc. The other players were generally divided as two defenders, one midfielder, and two forwards. Substitution was unlimited and may happen "on the fly" during play.

Fouls and misconducts were generally the same as outdoor soccer with a few changes. First, all kicks were direct, with no whistle to restart play, which usually resulted in a "quick start". Also, the MISL utilized blue cards in addition to the traditional yellow and red cards of outdoor soccer.

Blue cards were for fouls that earn possible two-minute power plays. Yellow cards were given for dissent, resulting in a 5-minute penalty but the offending team did not play short.

All red cards in the MISL resulted in a two-minute power play. Red cards were awarded for violent conduct or accumulation of cards (3 blues or 2 yellows).

Originally, the MISL had a multiple point scoring system where goals were worth 1, 2, or 3 points depending upon the distance that they were scored or game situation. The former WISL teams objected to this. After the 2003 Championship, the league began using a traditional one-point-per-goal rule because of a controversial goal scored during the deciding game. However, the league went back to multipoint scoring in 2006 with 2- and 3-point goals.

== Average attendance ==
Year	Regular season	Playoffs
2001–02	5,065	9,280
2002–03	5,420	7,010
2003–04	5,587	6,330
2004–05	4,388	5,864
2005–06	4,737	7,386
2006–07	4,711	4,023
2007–08	4,577	4,463
Seasons	Average	Playoffs Avg.
7	4,957	6,212

== See also ==
- List of professional sports teams in the United States and Canada
- Sports league attendances
- Record attendances in United States club soccer
