= 2008–09 Xtreme Soccer League season =

Xtreme Soccer League
- Season: 2008–09
- Champions: Detroit Ignition
- Matches played: 40
- Goals scored: 421 (10.53 per match)
- Top goalscorer: Lucio Gonzaga (23)
- Biggest home win: Chicago 8–23 New Jersey (January 9)
- Biggest away win: Milwaukee 20–5 Chicago (April 5)
- Longest winning run: 5 games by Detroit (January 10–February 8)
- Longest losing run: 5 games by Chicago (December 31–February 1)
- Highest attendance: 8,272 New Jersey – Milwaukee (March 29)
- Lowest attendance: 1,308 New Jersey – Chicago (January 4)
- Average attendance: 3,435

The 2008–09 Xtreme Soccer League season was the only season for the league. The members of the XSL's first season were four former MISL II teams: the Chicago Storm, the Detroit Ignition, the Milwaukee Wave, and the New Jersey Ironmen. The regular season kicked off on December 13, 2008, and concluded on April 5, 2009.

On March 29, 2009, the Detroit Ignition claimed the XSL championship when the New Jersey Ironmen defeated the Milwaukee Wave 15–14.

The league went on a one-year hiatus after its inaugural season but never returned to active play. The Milwaukee Wave joined the MISL III for the 2009–10 season.

== League standings ==
Pos	Team	Pld	W	L	PF	PA	PD	PCT	GB
1	Detroit Ignition	20	12	8	238	208	+30	.600	—
2	New Jersey Ironmen	20	11	9	246	239	+7	.550	1
3	Milwaukee Wave	20	10	10	236	216	+20	.500	2
4	Chicago Storm	20	7	13	176	233	−57	.350	5

Source: XSL

== Scoring leaders ==
GP = Games Played, G = Goals, A = Assists, Pts = Points

Player	Team	GP	G	A	Pts
Lucio Gonzaga	New Jersey	19	23	9	63
Marco Terminesi	Milwaukee	20	19	12	52
Adauto Neto	New Jersey	18	15	16	46
Ryan Mack	Detroit	19	15	10	43
Carlos Farias	New Jersey	18	11	16	43
Giuliano Oliviero	Milwaukee	20	10	20	40
Ian Bennett	Chicago	20	13	7	35
Goran Vasić	New Jersey	16	9	16	34
Kyt Selaidopoulos	Detroit	20	9	14	33
Miodrag Djerisilo	Chicago	18	11	8	32

== Players of the Month ==
Month	Offense	Defense	Goalkeeper
December	Giuliano Oliviero, Milwaukee	Josh Rife, Detroit	Marcel Feenstra, Milwaukee
January	Lucio Gonzaga, New Jersey	Troy Dusosky, Milwaukee	Danny Waltman, Detroit
February	Adauto Neto, New Jersey	Fabinho Ribeiro, Chicago	Nick Vorberg, Milwaukee
March	Adauto Neto, New Jersey	Rey Martinez, New Jersey	Danny Waltman, Detroit

== League awards ==
- Most Valuable Player: Danny Waltman, Detroit
- Offensive Player of the Year: Lucio Gonzaga, New Jersey
- Defensive Player of the Year: Josh Rife, Detroit
- Goalkeeper of the Year: Danny Waltman, Detroit
- Rookie of the Year: Marco Terminesi, Milwaukee
- Coach of the Year: Matt Johnson, Detroit

== All-XSL Team ==
Player	Pos.	Team
Danny Waltman	G	Detroit
Josh Rife	D	Detroit
Troy Dusosky	D	Milwaukee
Lucio Gonzaga	M/F	New Jersey
Marco Terminesi	M/F	Milwaukee
Adauto Neto	M/F	New Jersey
