= 2006–07 Major Indoor Soccer League season =

Major Indoor Soccer League
- Season: 2006–07
- Champions: Philadelphia KiXX; 2nd title
- Matches: 90
- Goals: 1,028 (11.42 per match)
- Top goalscorer: (United States) Jamar Beasley (40)
- Biggest home win: California 6–26 Philadelphia (December 2)
- Biggest away win: Baltimore 20–9 California (January 11)
- Longest winning run: 8 games by Baltimore (February 2–March 11)
- Longest losing run: 8 games by California (February 7–March 23)
- Average attendance: 4,711

The 2006–07 Major Indoor Soccer League season was the sixth season for the league. The regular season started on November 4, 2006, and ended on April 7, 2007.

== Teams ==
Team	City/Area	Arena
Baltimore Blast	Baltimore, Maryland	1st Mariner Arena
California Cougars	Stockton, California	Stockton Arena
Chicago Storm	Chicago, Illinois	Sears Centre
Detroit Ignition	Plymouth, Michigan	Compuware Arena
Milwaukee Wave	Milwaukee, Wisconsin	UW–Milwaukee Panther Arena
Philadelphia KiXX	Philadelphia, Pennsylvania	Wachovia Spectrum

== Map of clubs ==
Major Indoor Soccer League clubs

== League Standings ==
Pos	Team	Pld	W	L	PF	PA	PD	PCT	GB
1	Detroit Ignition	30	18	12	374	330	+44	.600	—
2	Chicago Storm	30	17	13	372	341	+31	.567	1
3	Philadelphia KiXX	30	17	13	377	343	+34	.567	1
4	Milwaukee Wave	30	16	14	397	360	+37	.533	2
5	Baltimore Blast	30	15	15	327	322	+5	.500	3
6	California Cougars	30	7	23	331	482	−151	.233	11

== Playoffs ==
Semifinals
1	Detroit Ignition	11	10	2
4	Milwaukee Wave	13	8	0
2	Chicago Storm	11	6	0
3	Philadelphia KiXX	8	10	2

Finals
1	Detroit Ignition	8
3	Philadelphia KiXX	13

== Scoring leaders ==
GP = Games Played, G = Goals, A = Assists, Pts = Points

Player	Team	GP	G	A	Pts
(United States) Jamar Beasley	Detroit	29	40	22	107
(United States) Greg Howes	Milwaukee	30	35	29	105
(United States) Don D'Ambra	Philadelphia	28	32	18	85
(United States) Todd Dusosky	Milwaukee	24	24	29	78
(England) Stephen Armstrong	Chicago	29	32	7	76
(Mexico) Genoni Martinez	Philadelphia	27	22	21	73
(Hungary) Mark Ughy	Chicago	24	28	14	71
(United States) Denison Cabral	Baltimore	28	25	14	65
(Jamaica) Machel Millwood	Baltimore	28	28	9	65
(United States) Enrique Tovar	California	28	26	10	63

== League awards ==
- Most Valuable Player: (United States) Jamar Beasley, Detroit
- Defender of the Year: (Mexico) Genoni Martinez, Philadelphia
- Rookie of the Year: (England) Stephen Armstrong, Chicago
- Goalkeeper of the Year: (United States) Pete Pappas, Philadelphia
- Coach of the Year: (United States) Mark Pulisic, Detroit
- Championship Series Finals MVP: (United States) Don D'Ambra, Philadelphia

== All-MISL Teams ==
=== First Team ===
Player	Pos.	Team
(United States) Pete Pappas	G	Philadelphia
(Mexico) Genoni Martinez	D	Philadelphia
(United States) Pat Morris	D	Philadelphia
(United States) Jamar Beasley	F	Detroit
(United States) Greg Howes	F	Milwaukee
(United States) Don D'Ambra	F	Philadelphia

=== Second Team ===
Player	Pos.	Team
(Brazil) Sagu	G	Baltimore
(Brazil) Sanaldo Carvalho	G	Detroit
(United States) Troy Dusosky	D	Milwaukee
(South Africa) Jonathan Greenfield	D	Detroit
(Hungary) Mark Ughy	F	Chicago
(United States) Todd Dusosky	F	Milwaukee
(England) Stephen Armstrong	F	Chicago

=== All-Rookie Team ===
Player	Pos.	Team
(United States) Patrick Hannigan	G	Philadelphia
(United States) Mike Lookingland	D	Baltimore
(United States) Nate Craft	D	Detroit
(England) Stephen Armstrong	F	Chicago
(Brazil) Marcio Leite	F	Milwaukee
(United States) Tony Donatelli	F	Philadelphia
