= 2007–08 Major Indoor Soccer League season =

Major Indoor Soccer League
- Season: 2007–08
- Champions: Baltimore Blast; 4th title
- Matches: 135
- Goals: 1,549 (11.47 per match)
- Top goalscorer: (United States) Greg Howes (45)
- Biggest home win: Orlando 5–27 New Jersey (March 2)
- Biggest away win: Detroit 25–7 Chicago (December 22)
- Longest winning run: 8 games by Detroit (February 15–March 28)
- Longest losing run: 16 games by Orlando (October 26–January 12)
- Average attendance: 4,577

The 2007–08 Major Indoor Soccer League season was the seventh and final season for the league. The regular season started on October 19, 2007, and ended on April 5, 2008.

== Teams ==
Team	City/Area	Arena
Baltimore Blast	Baltimore, Maryland	1st Mariner Arena
California Cougars	Stockton, California	Stockton Arena
Chicago Storm	Chicago, Illinois	Sears Centre
Detroit Ignition	Plymouth, Michigan	Compuware Arena
Milwaukee Wave	Milwaukee, Wisconsin	UW–Milwaukee Panther Arena
Monterrey La Raza	Monterrey, Mexico	Arena Monterrey
New Jersey Ironmen	Newark, New Jersey	Prudential Center
Orlando Sharks	Orlando, Florida	Amway Arena
Philadelphia KiXX	Philadelphia, Pennsylvania	Wachovia Spectrum

== Map of clubs ==
Major Indoor Soccer League clubs

== League Standings ==
Pos	Team	Pld	W	L	PF	PA	PD	PCT	GB
1	Detroit Ignition	30	22	8	455	310	+145	.733	—
2	Milwaukee Wave	30	22	8	424	297	+127	.733	—
3	Baltimore Blast	30	19	11	392	289	+103	.633	3
4	Monterrey La Raza	30	16	14	441	399	+42	.533	6
5	Chicago Storm	30	15	15	321	346	−25	.500	7
6	New Jersey Ironmen	30	14	16	343	381	−38	.467	8
7	Philadelphia KiXX	30	12	18	310	349	−39	.400	10
8	California Cougars	30	11	19	364	450	−86	.367	11
9	Orlando Sharks	30	4	26	235	464	−229	.133	18

== Playoffs ==
Quarterfinals
4	Monterrey La Raza	8	17	3
5	Chicago Storm	10	5	0
3	Baltimore Blast	22	6	–
6	New Jersey Ironmen	10	4	–

Semifinals
1	Detroit Ignition	11	21	0
4	Monterrey La Raza	15	2	2
2	Milwaukee Wave	8	13	–
3	Baltimore Blast	13	14	–

Finals
4	Monterrey La Raza	11
3	Baltimore Blast	14

== Scoring leaders ==
GP = Games Played, G = Goals, A = Assists, Pts = Points

Player	Team	GP	G	A	Pts
(United States) Greg Howes	Milwaukee	28	45	32	130
(United States) Dino Delevski	Monterrey	28	44	13	108
(Mexico) Genoni Martinez	Monterrey	30	31	24	96
(United States) Dan Antoniuk	New Jersey	29	39	11	89
(United States) Denison Cabral	Baltimore	29	36	12	88
(Jamaica) Machel Millwood	Baltimore	29	30	23	83
(United States) Jamar Beasley	Detroit	26	33	14	82
(Brazil) Marcio Leite	Milwaukee	30	27	20	80
(Brazil) Hewerton Moreira	Detroit	30	24	24	77
(United States) Enrique Tovar	California	27	29	13	74

== League awards ==
- Most Valuable Player: (United States) Greg Howes, Milwaukee
- Defender of the Year: (Mexico) Genoni Martinez, Monterrey
- Rookie of the Year: (Canada) Frederico Moojen, New Jersey
- Goalkeeper of the Year: (Brazil) Sagu, Baltimore
- Coach of the Year: (United States) Keith Tozer, Milwaukee
- Championship Series Finals MVP: (United States) Denison Cabral, Baltimore

== All-MISL Teams ==
First Team	Pos.	Second Team
(Brazil) Sagu, Baltimore	G	(United States) Danny Waltman, Detroit
(Mexico) Genoni Martinez, Monterrey	D	(United States) Pat Morris, Philadelphia
(United States) Droo Callahan, Detroit	D	(United States) P.J. Wakefield, Baltimore
(United States) Greg Howes, Milwaukee	F	(United States) Denison Cabral, Baltimore
(United States) Dino Delevski, Monterrey	F	(Brazil) Marcio Leite, Milwaukee
(United States) Dan Antoniuk, New Jersey	F	(United States) Jamar Beasley, Detroit

=== All-Rookie Team ===
Player	Pos.	Team
(Argentina) Jose Bontti	G	Philadelphia
(United States) Jonathan Santos	D	Milwaukee
(Guyana) J. P. Rodrigues	D	Orlando
(United States) Warren Ukah	F	Milwaukee
(Canada) Frederico Moojen	F	New Jersey
(United States) Ivan Medina	F	Monterrey
