= 2004–05 Major Indoor Soccer League season =

Major Indoor Soccer League
- Season: 2004–05
- Champions: Milwaukee Wave
- Matches: 145
- Goals: 1,581 (10.9 per match)
- Top goalscorer: (United States) Greg Howes (41)
- Biggest home win: Monterrey 2–10 San Diego (October 29)
- Biggest away win: Philadelphia 8–2 Kansas City (April 23)
- Longest winning run: 6 games by Chicago (January 21–February 18) and Milwaukee (February 13–26)
- Longest losing run: 7 games by Chicago (December 12–January 16)
- Average attendance: 4,338

The 2004–05 Major Indoor Soccer League season was the fourth season for the league. The regular season started on October 9, 2004, and ended on April 24, 2005.

== Teams ==
Team	City/Area	Arena
Baltimore Blast	Baltimore, Maryland	1st Mariner Arena
Chicago Storm	Chicago, Illinois	UIC Pavilion
Cleveland Force	Cleveland, Ohio	CSU Convocation Center
Kansas City Comets	Kansas City, Missouri	Kemper Arena
Milwaukee Wave	Milwaukee, Wisconsin	UW–Milwaukee Panther Arena
Monterrey Tigres	Monterrey, Mexico	Arena Monterrey
Philadelphia KiXX	Philadelphia, Pennsylvania	Wachovia Spectrum
San Diego Sockers	San Diego, California	San Diego Sports Arena
St. Louis Steamers	St. Louis, Missouri	Scottrade Center

== Map of clubs ==
Major Indoor Soccer League clubs

== League standings ==
Pos	Team	Pld	W	L	GF	GA	GD	PCT	GB
1	Milwaukee Wave	39	24	15	219	173	+46	.615	—
2	Cleveland Force	39	23	16	233	217	+16	.590	1
3	Philadelphia KiXX	39	22	17	215	195	+20	.564	2
4	St. Louis Steamers	40	20	20	210	219	−9	.500	4.5
5	Chicago Storm	39	18	21	212	217	−5	.462	6
6	Kansas City Comets	39	18	21	207	237	−30	.462	6
7	Baltimore Blast	39	15	24	205	238	−33	.385	9
8	San Diego Sockers	10	4	6	52	45	+7	.400	5.5
9	Monterrey Tigres	6	1	5	28	40	−12	.167	6.5

== Playoffs ==
Semifinals
1	Milwaukee Wave	4	6	–
4	St. Louis Steamers	3	5	–
2	Cleveland Force	6	10	–
3	Philadelphia KiXX	3	6	–

Finals
1	Milwaukee Wave	10	10	–
2	Cleveland Force	9	9	–

== Scoring leaders ==
GP = Games Played, G = Goals, A = Assists, Pts = Points

Player	Team	GP	G	A	Pts
(United States) Greg Howes	Milwaukee	36	41	32	73
(United States) John Ball	Cleveland	38	30	31	61
(United States) Carlos Farias	St. Louis	36	29	29	58
(United States) Dino Delevski	Kansas City	31	34	22	56
(United States) Giuliano Celenza	Baltimore	37	32	17	49
(United States) Don D'Ambra	Philadelphia	34	32	16	48
(Federal Republic of Yugoslavia) Novi Marojević	Chicago	39	29	19	48
(United States) Daryl Doran	St. Louis	38	17	31	48
(Bermuda) John Barry Nusum	Philadelphia	31	28	17	45
(United States) Kevin Sloan	Philadelphia	37	31	14	45

== League awards ==
- Most Valuable Player: (United States) Greg Howes, Milwaukee
- Defender of the Year: (United States) Pat Morris, Philadelphia
- Rookie of the Year: (Bermuda) John Barry Nusum, Philadelphia
- Goalkeeper of the Year: (United States) Pete Pappas, Philadelphia
- Coach of the Year: (United States) Omid Namazi, Cleveland
- Championship Series Finals MVP: (United States) Todd Dusosky, Milwaukee

== All-MISL Teams ==
First Team	Pos.	Second Team
(United States) Pete Pappas, Philadelphia	G	(United States) Nick Vorberg, Milwaukee
(United States) Pat Morris, Philadelphia	D	(Federal Republic of Yugoslavia) Vlatko Andonovski, Kansas City
(Mexico) Genoni Martinez, Cleveland	D	(United States) Chris Morman, Milwaukee
(United States) Greg Howes, Milwaukee	F	(United States) Dino Delevski, Kansas City
(United States) John Ball, Cleveland	F	(United States) Giuliano Celenza, Baltimore
(United States) Don D'Ambra, Philadelphia	F	(Chile) Carlos Farias, St. Louis

=== All-Rookie Team ===
Player	Pos.	Team
(United States) Danny Waltman	G	Chicago
(United States) Lazo Alavanja	D	Chicago
(United States) Chris Fehrle	D	Philadelphia
(Mexico) Byron Alvarez	F	Chicago
(Bermuda) John Barry Nusum	F	Philadelphia
(Brazil) James Koehler	F	Kansas City
