= Goran Vasić =

Yugoslav footballer

Personal information
- Date of birth: July 3, 1972 (age 54)
- Place of birth: Belgrade, Yugoslavia
- Height: 5 ft 9 in (1.75 m)
- Positions: Midfielder; forward

Youth career
- 1980–1989: Red Star Belgrade

Senior career*
Years	Team	Apps	(Gls)
1990–1993	Jugopetrol		
- Palilulac Beograd
1997	Houston Hotshots (indoor)		
1998–2002	Cleveland Crunch (indoor)	144	(118)
1999–2001	Pittsburgh Riverhounds	28	(0)
2002–2006	Philadelphia KiXX (indoor)	133	(60)
2007	Milwaukee Wave (indoor)	11	(2)
2007–2008	New Jersey Ironmen (indoor)	37	(19)

Managerial career
- 2008–2009: New Jersey Ironmen (assistant)
- 2018: Zobahan (assistant)
- * Club domestic league appearances and goals

Goran Vasic (born 3 July 1972) is a Yugoslav retired association football player who played professionally in Yugoslavia and the United States.

When Vasic was eight, he entered the Red Star Belgrade youth system. In 1990, he began his professional career with FK Jugopetrol. He played for FK Palilulac Beograd before moving to the United States in May 1997. When he arrived, Vasic signed with the Houston Hotshots of the Continental Indoor Soccer League. In 1998, he moved to the Cleveland Crunch of the National Professional Soccer League, winning the league championship with them that season. In 2002, the Crunch traded Vasic to the Philadelphia KiXX. Vasic again won the league title as the KiXX took the 2002 Major Indoor Soccer League championship over the Milwaukee Wave. The KiXX released Vasic during the 2006 off season. On February 13, 2007, Vasic signed with the Wave for the second half of the season. In the fall of 2007, Vasic joined the New Jersey Ironmen, playing two seasons with them, the second in the Xtreme Soccer League. In addition to his indoor career, Vasic also played the 1999 and 2000 outdoor seasons with the Pittsburgh Riverhounds of the USL A-League.

On November 28, 2008, Vasic became an assistant coach with the Ironmen.
