= Josh Rife =

American soccer player

Personal information
- Date of birth: December 29, 1979 (age 46)
- Place of birth: Honolulu, Hawaii, U.S.
- Height: 6 ft 0 in (1.83 m)
- Positions: Defender; midfielder

College career
Years	Team	Apps	(Gls)
1998–1999	TCU Horned Frogs		
2000–2001	Indiana Hoosiers		

Senior career*
Years	Team	Apps	(Gls)
2003–2012	Charlotte Eagles	204	(7)
2005–2006	Philadelphia KiXX (indoor)	25	(6)
2006–2009	Detroit Ignition (indoor)	12	(9)
2009–2013	Milwaukee Wave (indoor)	94	(22)
2013	VSI Tampa Bay FC	26	(2)
2017	Cedar Rapids Rampage (indoor)	1	(0)

Managerial career
- 2008–?: Palm Beach Atlantic Sailfish (assistant)
- 2013–2014: Rochester Lancers
- 2015: Pittsburgh Riverhounds (assistant)
- 2015: Pittsburgh Riverhounds U23
- 2016–2017: Liberty Flames (assistant)
- 2018: Mississippi State Bulldogs (assistant)
- 2019–2024: Ball State Cardinals
- 2025–: Indiana Hoosiers
- * Club domestic league appearances and goals

Josh Rife is an American retired soccer player who currently coaches for the Indiana Hoosiers women's soccer team. He previously was the head coach of the Ball State Cardinals.

== Playing career ==
=== Youth and college ===
Rife grew up in Denton, Texas, and attended Denton High School, where he was a varsity starter all four years. He played club soccer for the Texas Longhorns, a Dallas based soccer club, from the age of nine until he was eighteen years old. At the age of eleven he toured Norway, Sweden, and Denmark with a Venezuelan youth team and played in a series of tournaments where he garnered local and national attention.

He played two years of college soccer at Texas Christian University as a starting defender, before transferring to Indiana University in 2000 to pursue a higher level of play under legendary coach Jerry Yeagley. During his two years at Indiana Rife started 46 matches, was awarded first team All-Big Ten Selection in 2000 and 2001 and first team NSCAA All-Region selection in 2001, and helped the team to two College Cups, the Big Ten Tournament in 2001, and the 2000 regular season championship.

=== Outdoor Professional Soccer ===
Rife signed with the Charlotte Eagles of the USL Professional Division in 2003. He helped the team win the USL2 Championship in 2005, and was named USL-2 Defender of the Year in 2006. Charlotte has reached its league championship game five times since 2004.

After a decade with Charlotte Eagles, Rife moved to USL Pro club VSI Tampa Bay FC at the beginning of the 2013 season. He played 26 games, was the captain/Defender and made second-team All-USL PRO selection. Upon completion of his inaugural season with VSI Tampa Bay FC, Rife retired from playing indoor and outdoor soccer.

=== Indoor Professional Soccer ===
Rife played professional indoor soccer with the Milwaukee Wave in the Major Indoor Soccer League. During his 2009 – 2010 season, he was named Second Team All MISL and MISL Defensive Player of Month in January and March. Rife led the MISL with 36 blocked shots and he played all 20 games scoring 11 goals and tallying 28 points. He previously played for the indoor teams Philadelphia KiXX and Detroit Ignition. He signed with the Philadelphia KiXX of the Major Indoor Soccer League on November 4, 2005, after a successful trial with the team the previous October, and went on to be named to the 2006 All-MISL Rookie Team. On October 19, 2006, KiXX traded Rife to the Detroit Ignition of the Xtreme Soccer League in exchange for Don D'Ambra. While with the Detroit Ignition Josh was named the Xtreme Soccer League Defensive Player of the Year. He led the XSL with 31 shot blocks as Detroit won the league championship.

== Coaching career ==
Rife joined the PBA Sailfish in 2008 as Assistant Coach for the men's team. In 2010, the team won the National Christian College Athletic Association national title.

The head coach, Jose Gomez, is Rife's former Charlotte Eagles team-mate.

Rife was announced as the head coach of the MISL's Rochester Lancers on September 13, 2013. He is the youngest coach in MISL history.

== Personal life ==
In 2006, Rife married Charlotte Lady Eagles player Christy Timbers-Rife.
