= Joe Di Buono =

Canadian soccer player

Personal information
- Date of birth: April 22, 1981 (age 45)
- Place of birth: Montreal, Quebec, Canada
- Position: Midfielder

College career
Years	Team	Apps	(Gls)
1999–2001	John Abbott College		
2001	Fairleigh Dickinson University		
2002–2004	Robert Morris University		

Senior career*
Years	Team	Apps	(Gls)
2006	Polonia Warsaw	0	(0)
2007	Trois-Rivières Attak	12	(3)
2007–2008	Milwaukee Wave (indoor)	22	(6)
2008	LaSalle-Lakeshore United		
2008–2010	Philadelphia KiXX (indoor)	33	(5)

International career
2009–2010	Canada Beach	6	(0)
- * Club domestic league appearances and goals

Joe Di Buono (born April 22, 1981) is a Canadian former soccer player who played as a midfielder.

== Club career ==
=== College ===
Di Buono originally played at the college level in 2001 with Fairleigh Dickinson University and later transferred to Robert Morris University. Before playing in the United States, he played with John Abbott College, where he was named to the all-star team in 2000. In 2000, he was named the top male athlete. Throughout his time with Robert Morris, he was selected for the First Team All-Star designation and the Mid-Atlantic Region's Third All-Star Team.

=== Early career ===
He was drafted in the first round of the USL First Division college draft by Montreal Impact in 2005. After failing to secure a contract with Montreal, he went abroad to Europe to play in the Polish Ekstraklasa with Polonia Warsaw in 2006. After failing to make his debut for Polonia, he departed from the club once the season concluded.

He returned to Canada in the summer of 2007, when he initially took part in the preseason training camp with the Montreal Impact. Ultimately, he would play in the Canadian Soccer League with Trois-Rivières Attak, which was the farm team for the Montreal Impact. In his debut season with Trois-Rivières, he helped the team win the Open Canada Cup after defeating Columbus Clan F.C. in the finals. Throughout the regular season, he helped Trois-Rivières achieve an 18-game undefeated streak and clinched a postseason berth by finishing second in the National Division. In the first round of the postseason, the Quebec side defeated Italia Shooters to advance to the next round. The Attak was eliminated from the competition in the next stage by the Serbian White Eagles. In total, he played in 12 matches and scored 3 goals.

In 2008, he played in Quebec's local circuit league, the Ligue de soccer élite du Québec, with LaSalle-Lakeshore United.

=== Indoor career ===
In the winter of 2007, he transitioned into indoor soccer and played in the Major Indoor Soccer League with the Milwaukee Wave. In his debut season with Milwaukee, he played in 22 matches and recorded 6 goals.

The following season, he played in the newly formed National Indoor Soccer League with the Philadelphia KiXX. He would record his first goal for the club on March 14, 2009, against Baltimore Blast. He would play in 15 matches and record 2 goals with Philadelphia. Di Buono re-signed with Philadelphia the following season. In his second season with Philadelphia, he appeared in 18 matches and scored 3 goals.

== International career ==
Di Buono represented the Canada national beach soccer team at the 2009 CONCACAF Beach Soccer Championship, where he made his debut on June 17, 2009, against Mexico. He was selected once again to represent the national team in the 2010 CONCACAF Beach Soccer Championship.

== Honors ==
Trois-Rivières Attak

- Open Canada Cup: 2007
