= Lazo Alavanja =

American soccer player

Personal information
- Date of birth: January 18, 1977 (age 49)
- Place of birth: Schererville, Indiana, United States
- Height: 6 ft 0 in (1.83 m)
- Position: Midfielder

College career
Years	Team	Apps	(Gls)
1995–1998	Indiana Hoosiers		

Senior career*
Years	Team	Apps	(Gls)
1999–2000	Dallas Burn	25	(2)
1999	→ Texas Toros (loan)	1	(0)
1999	→ MLS Pro 40 (loan)	20	(3)
2001	Miami Fusion	16	(0)
2002	D.C. United	17	(0)
2003	Indiana Blast	5	(0)
2003	Cincinnati Riverhawks	2	(0)
2004–2006	Chicago Storm (indoor)	65	(24)
2005–2008	Charleston Battery	113	(12)
2007–2008	New Jersey Ironmen (indoor)	26	(16)
2008–2009	Chicago Storm (indoor)	7	(1)
Total		297	(58)

Managerial career
- 2008: UIC Flames (assistant)
- * Club domestic league appearances and goals as of 28 January 2009

Lazo Alavanja (born January 18, 1977) is an American former soccer player who played as a midfielder for the Charleston Battery of the USL First Division and the Chicago Storm of the Xtreme Soccer League. He played professionally both in traditional and indoor soccer, often concurrently.

== Youth ==
Alavanja attended Lake Central High School in Scherervile, Indiana where he played both basketball and soccer. He then attended Indiana University, playing on the men's soccer team from 1995 to 1998. He was a 1996 and 1997 second team All American and a 1998 first team All American. In 1997, he played on the U.S. soccer team at the 1997 World University Games.

== Professional ==
In February 1999, the Dallas Burn selected Alavanja with the fourth pick in the 1999 MLS College Draft. He spent most of the 1999 season on loan with the Project 40 team. On May 10, 2001, the Burn sent Alavanja to the Miami Fusion in exchange for Miami's 2002 and 2003 second round SuperDraft picks. On January 11, 2002, D.C. United took him as the third pick in the 2002 MLS Dispersal Draft. He played the 2002 season with United. On May 9, 2003, the Indiana Blast of the USL A-League signed Alavanja. The Blast released him on June 9, 2003. In July 2003, he joined the Cincinnati Riverhawks. On October 14, 2004, the expansion Chicago Storm of the Major Indoor Soccer League signed Alavanja. He spent two seasons with the Storm, being named to the 2004-2005 MISL All Rookie Team. He did not play indoors during the 2006–2007 season and on June 5, 2007, the Storm traded his rights to the New Jersey Ironmen in exchange for a second-round pick in the 2007 expansion draft. He played twenty-eight games with the Ironmen during the 2007-2008 indoor season. In addition to playing the winter indoor seasons, Alavanja signed with the Charleston Battery of the outdoor USL First Division in 2005. In the fall of 2008, he returned to the Chicago Storm, now playing in the Xtreme Soccer League.

== Coach ==
Alavanja also works as an assistant coach with the University of Illinois Chicago men's soccer team and besides as head coach of the Sycamore, Illinois based Chicago Soccer Academy.
