= Jonathan Greenfield =

South African footballer

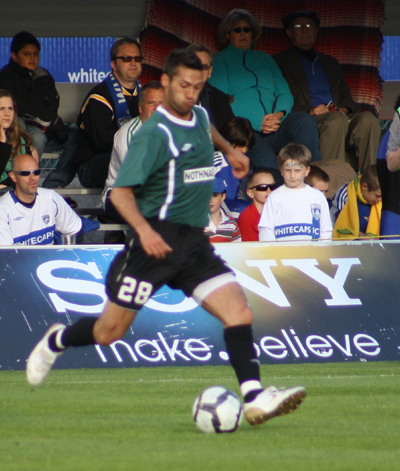

Personal information
- Date of birth: 18 February 1982 (age 44)
- Place of birth: Cape Town, South Africa
- Height: 6 ft 0 in (1.83 m)
- Positions: Defender; midfielder

Senior career*
Years	Team	Apps	(Gls)
2000	Vasco da Gama		
2000–2003	Mamelodi Sundowns		
2004–2006	Milwaukee Wave (indoor)	47	(9)
2005	Milwaukee Wave United	17	(2)
2006–2008	Detroit Ignition (indoor)	60	(23)
2007–2009	Minnesota Thunder	71	(1)
2008–2010	Baltimore Blast (indoor)	24	(8)
2010	Rochester Rhinos	28	(1)
2010–2016	Milwaukee Wave (indoor)	105	(28)
2012	San Antonio Scorpions	26	(3)
2013	Carolina RailHawks	4	(0)
2016—2018	Cedar Rapids Rampage (indoor)	20	(2)
2018	Baltimore Blast (indoor)	6	(1)

International career^{‡}
2000–2003	South Africa U23		
2016–	United States beach soccer		

Managerial career
- 2017—2018: Cedar Rapids Rampage
- * Club domestic league appearances and goals as of 24 January 2019 ‡ National team caps and goals as of 2 May 2009

Jonathan Greenfield (born 18 February 1982) is a South African soccer player.

== Career ==
=== Club ===
Born in Cape Town, Greenfield began his career in his native South Africa, playing professionally for Cape Town-based team Vasco da Gama in 2000, and then for Mamelodi Sundowns in the South African Premier Soccer League from 2000 to 2003.

Greenfield moved to the United States in 2004, and has since divided his time playing both outdoor and indoor soccer, for Milwaukee Wave United and Minnesota Thunder in the USL First Division, and for Milwaukee Wave, Detroit Ignition and Baltimore Blast in the Major Indoor Soccer League and the National Indoor Soccer League.

Greenfield won the 2009 NISL Championship with Baltimore, defeating Rockford Rampage 13–10 in the Championship Game.

=== International ===
Greenfield represented South Africa internationally at U-23 level, but has never played for the senior South African team.

== Honors ==
=== Rochester Rhinos ===
- USSF Division 2 Pro League Regular Season Champions (1): 2010
