= Plymouth Charter Township, Michigan =

Plymouth Township, Michigan
- Charter township
- Charter Township of Plymouth
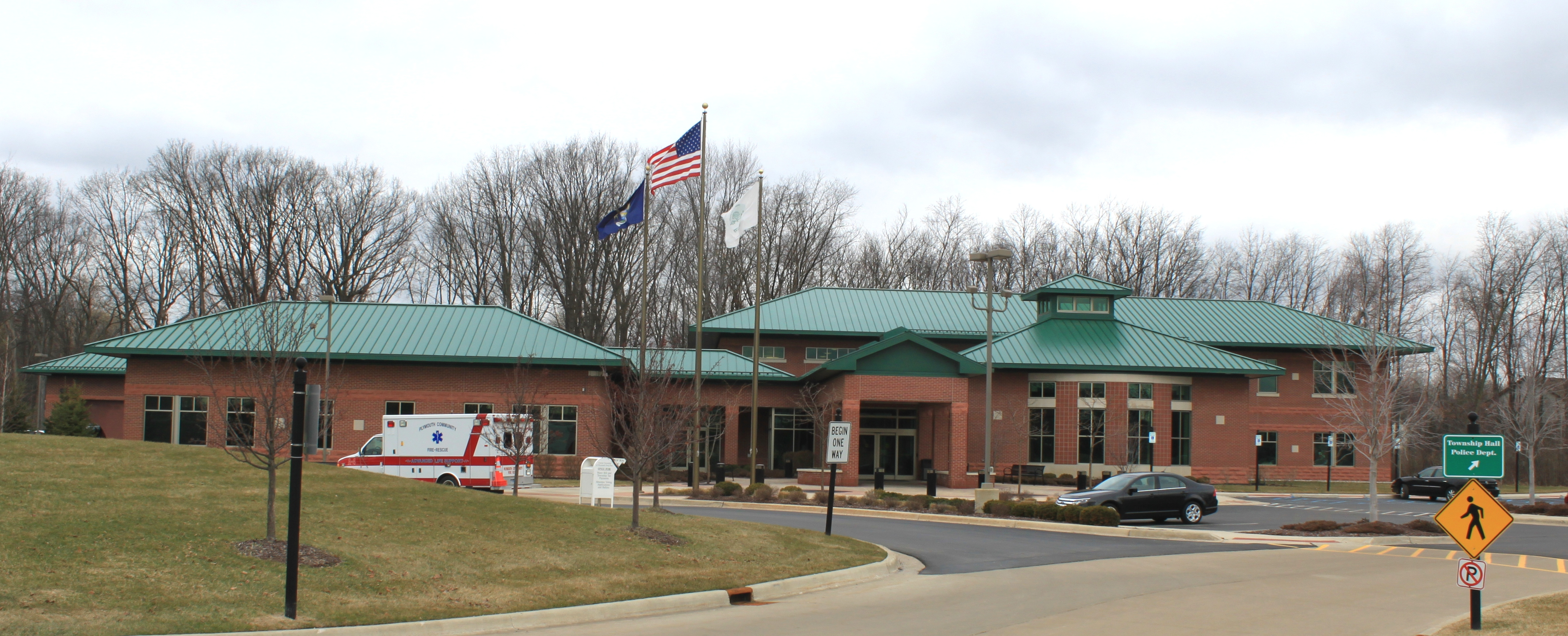
- Township Hall and Police Department

- Seal

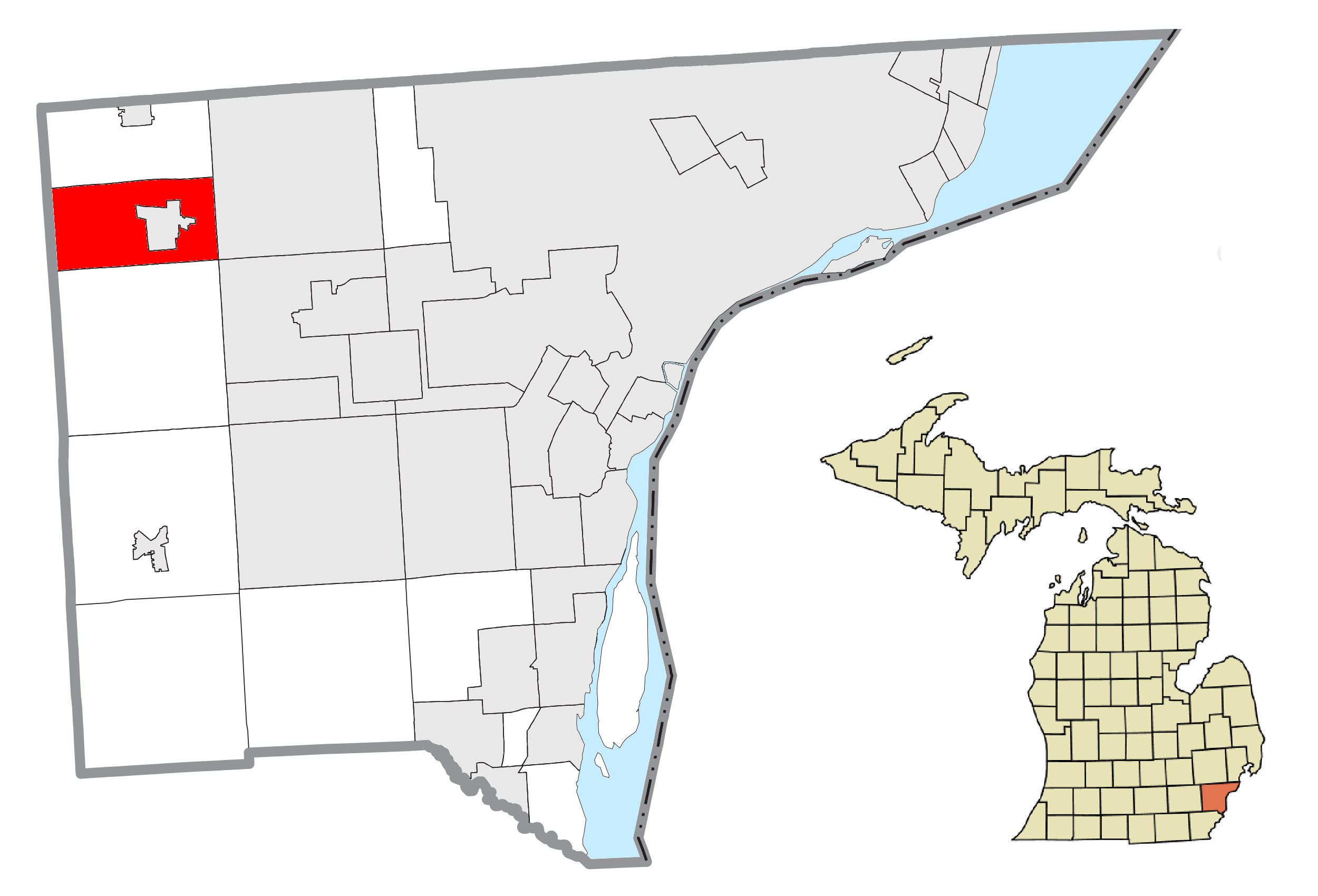
- Location within Wayne County

- Location within the state of Michigan Location within the United States
- Coordinates: 42°22′12″N 83°28′55″W
- Country: United States
- State: Michigan
- County: Wayne
- Established: 1827

Government
  - Body: Plymouth Township Board of Trustees
  - Supervisor: Chuck Curmi (Republican)
  - Clerk: Kim Gaedeke
  - Treasurer: Bob Doroshewitz
  - Trustee: Jen Buckley; Mark Clinton; Sandy Groth; John Stewart

Area
  - Charter township: 16.0 sq mi (41.4 km^{2})
  - Land: 15.9 sq mi (41.2 km^{2})
  - Water: 0.12 sq mi (0.3 km^{2})
- Elevation: 790 ft (240 m)

Population (2020)
  - Charter township: 27,938
  - Density: 1,760/sq mi (678/km^{2})
  - Metro: 4,285,832 (Metro Detroit)
- Time zone: UTC-5 (EST)
  - Summer (DST): UTC-4 (EDT)
- ZIP code(s): 48170 (Plymouth)
- Area code: 734
- FIPS code: 26-65080
- GNIS feature ID: 1626920
- Website: Official website

Plymouth Township is a charter township in Wayne County in the U.S. state of Michigan. A western suburb of Detroit, Plymouth Township is located roughly 27 miles (43.5 km) northwest of downtown Detroit, and 16 miles (25.7 km) northeast of Ann Arbor. As of the 2020 census, the township had a population of 27,938. It surrounds, but is independent of, the city of Plymouth.

== Geography ==
According to the United States Census Bureau, the charter township has a total area of 16.0 square miles (41 km^{2}), of which 15.9 square miles (41 km^{2}) is land and 0.04 square miles (0.10 km^{2}), or 0.25%, is water.

== Education ==
Plymouth Township is served by Plymouth-Canton Community Schools. P-CCS serves most of Canton & Plymouth Charter Townships in Wayne County, and portions of Northville Charter Township (also in Wayne County), Salem Township and Superior Charter Township (the latter two in Washtenaw County).

== Government ==
The primary governing body of Plymouth Township consists of a board of trustees. The membership of this board consists of the three primary elected executives (Supervisor, Treasurer, and Clerk), plus four additional at-large trustees. All seven members are elected to four-year terms that coincide with the United States Presidential election cycle.

In 1995 Plymouth Township and the City of Plymouth consolidated their fire departments with the township controlling fire services. The township received $1 million from the city, making up 25% of the consolidated fire department's budget. This agreement is no longer in effect, the city having withdrawn.

== Demographics ==
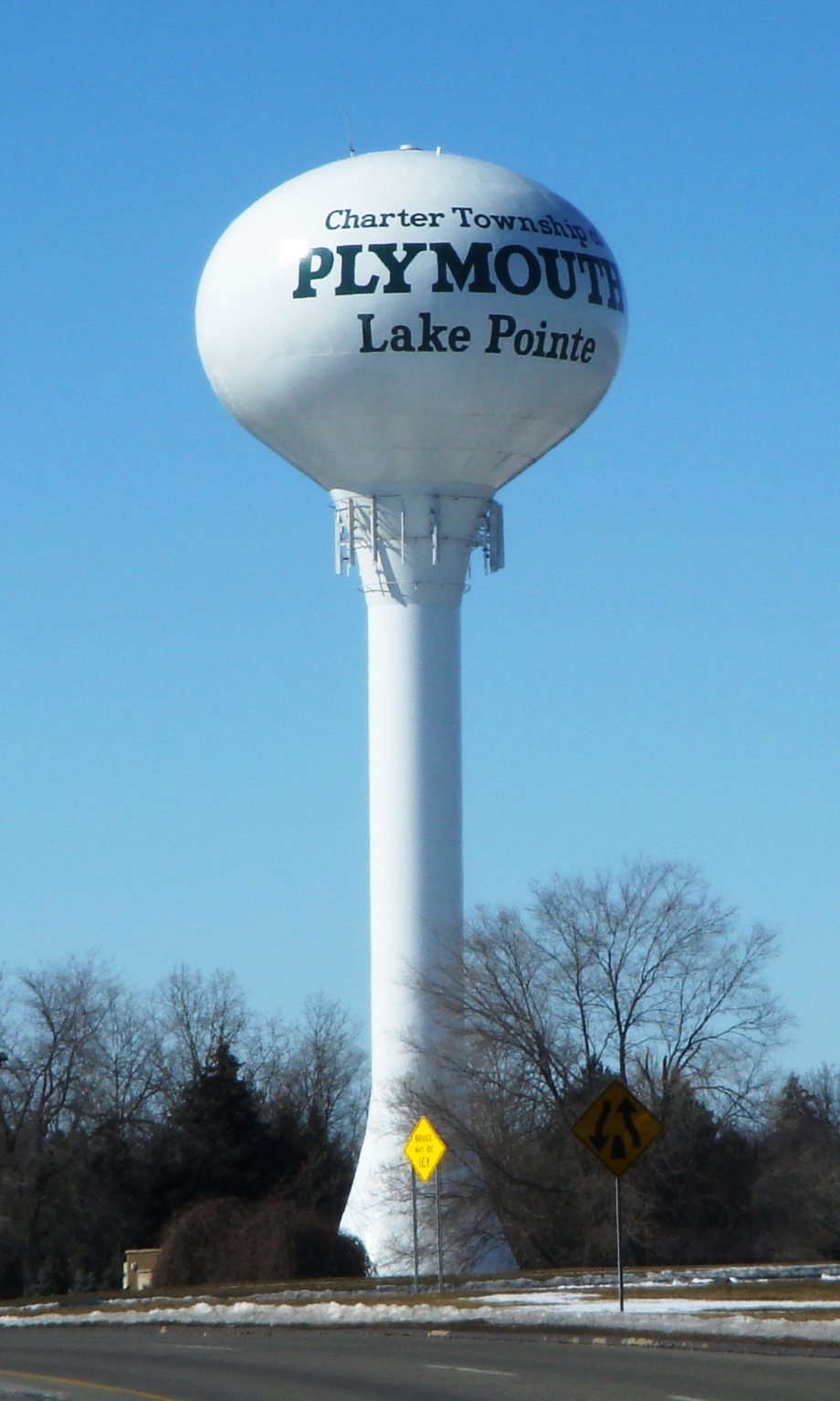
Plymouth Township water tower

=== Racial and ethnic composition ===
Plymouth Charter Township, Michigan – Racial and ethnic composition Note: the US Census treats Hispanic/Latino as an ethnic category. This table excludes Latinos from the racial categories and assigns them to a separate category. Hispanics/Latinos may be of any race.
Race / Ethnicity (NH = Non-Hispanic)	Pop 2000	Pop 2010	Pop 2020	% 2000	% 2010	% 2020
White alone (NH)	25,365	24,872	24,063	91.25%	90.36%	86.13%
Black or African American alone (NH)	809	589	526	2.91%	2.14%	1.88%
Native American or Alaska Native alone (NH)	72	68	40	0.26%	0.25%	0.14%
Asian alone (NH)	755	957	1,255	2.72%	3.48%	4.49%
Native Hawaiian or Pacific Islander alone (NH)	4	4	2	0.01%	0.01%	0.01%
Other race alone (NH)	30	22	91	0.11%	0.08%	0.33%
Mixed race or Multiracial (NH)	308	354	975	1.11%	1.29%	3.49%
Hispanic or Latino (any race)	455	658	986	1.64%	2.39%	3.53%
Total	27,798	27,524	27,938	100.00%	100.00%	100.00%

=== 2000 census ===
As of the census of 2000, there were 27,798 people, 10,757 households, and 7,680 families residing in the township. The population density was 1,746.3 inhabitants per square mile (674.3/km^{2}). There were 11,043 housing units at an average density of 693.7 per square mile (267.8/km^{2}). The racial makeup of the township was 92.38% White, 2.96% African American, 0.27% Native American, 2.73% Asian, 0.01% Pacific Islander, 0.40% from other races, and 1.25% from two or more races. 1.64% of the population were Hispanic or Latino of any race. 17.7% were of German, 13.8% Polish, 13.1% Irish, 9.5% English and 7.1% Italian ancestry according to Census 2000.

There were 10,757 households, out of which 30.7% had children under the age of 18 living with them, 63.1% were married couples living together, 6.1% had a female householder with no husband present, and 28.6% were non-families. 24.7% of all households were made up of individuals, and 9.2% had someone living alone who was 65 years of age or older. The average household size was 2.49 and the average family size was 3.01.

In the township, 22.6% of the population was under the age of 18, 6.5% was from 18 to 24, 30.4% from 25 to 44, 28.2% from 45 to 64, and 12.3% was 65 years of age or older. The median age was 40 years. For every 100 females, there were 100.9 males. For every 100 females age 18 and over, there were 100.6 males.

According to a 2007 estimate, the median income for a household in the township was $90,780, and the median income for a family was $111,006. Males had a median income of $64,583 versus $36,182 for females. The per capita income for the township was $37,081. About 0.9% of families and 1.8% of the population were below the poverty line, including 1.4% of those under age 18 and 1.8% of those age 65 or over.

== Highways ==
- I-96
- I-275 (joins to run concurrent with Interstate 96 within Plymouth Township)
- M-14

== Economy ==
Among the companies based in Plymouth Township are Aisin World Corp. of America, Hella Corporate Center USA, Adient and Metaldyne.

== Sports ==
Plymouth Township was home to the Ontario Hockey League's Plymouth Whalers, one of three American teams in the OHL and one of two in Michigan. The Whalers played in Compuware Arena, now known as USA Hockey Arena. After the 2014–2015 season, the team was sold and became the Flint Firebirds. The arena hosted the 2017 Women's Ice Hockey World Championships.

Plymouth Township was home to the indoor soccer team the Detroit Ignition of the Xtreme Soccer League. The Ignition played in the championship finals all three years of its existence. The team was disbanded after the 2008–2009 season. The Ignition played at Compuware Arena.

== Photo gallery ==
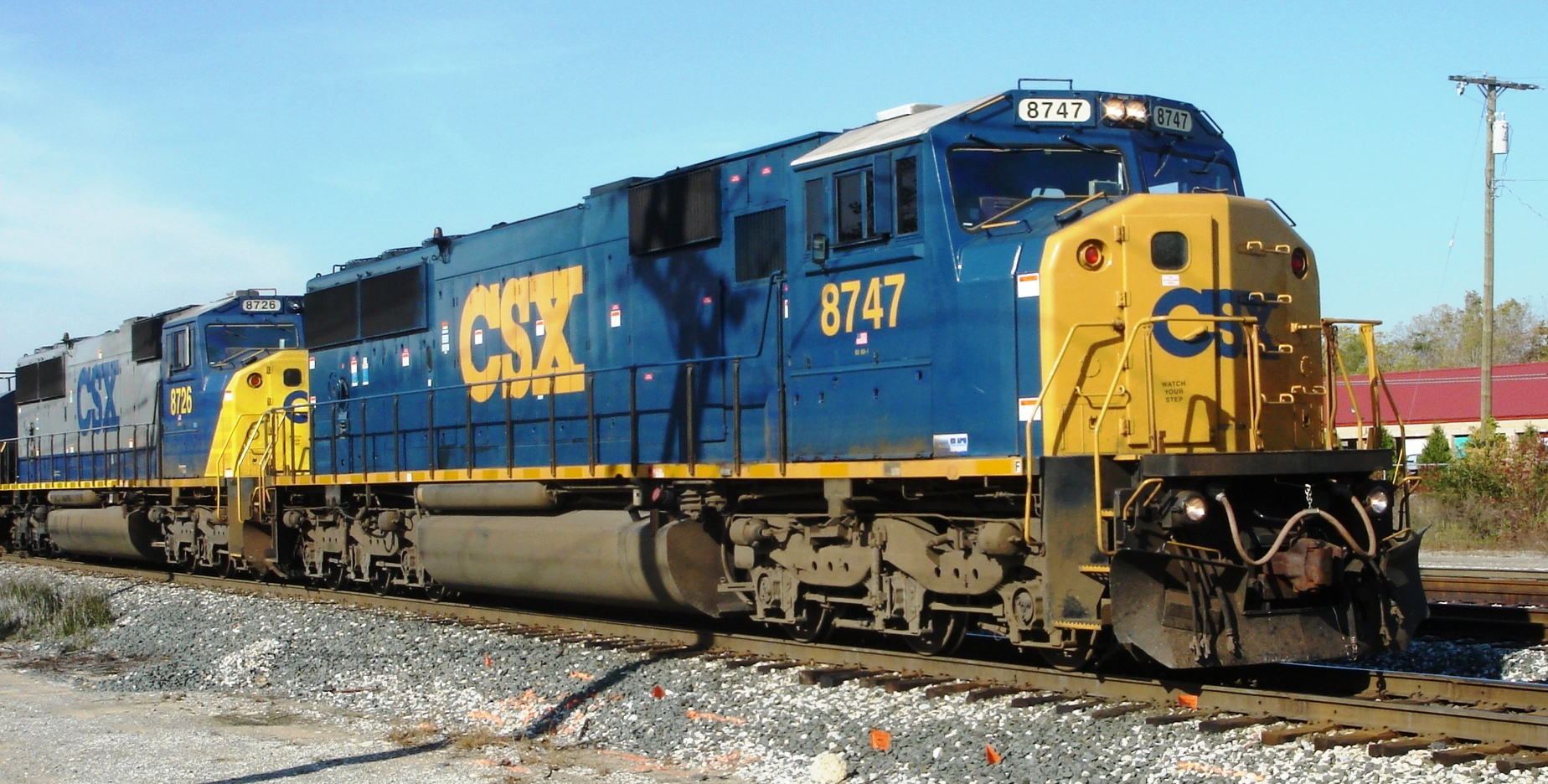
CSX engine 8747, Plymouth Michigan

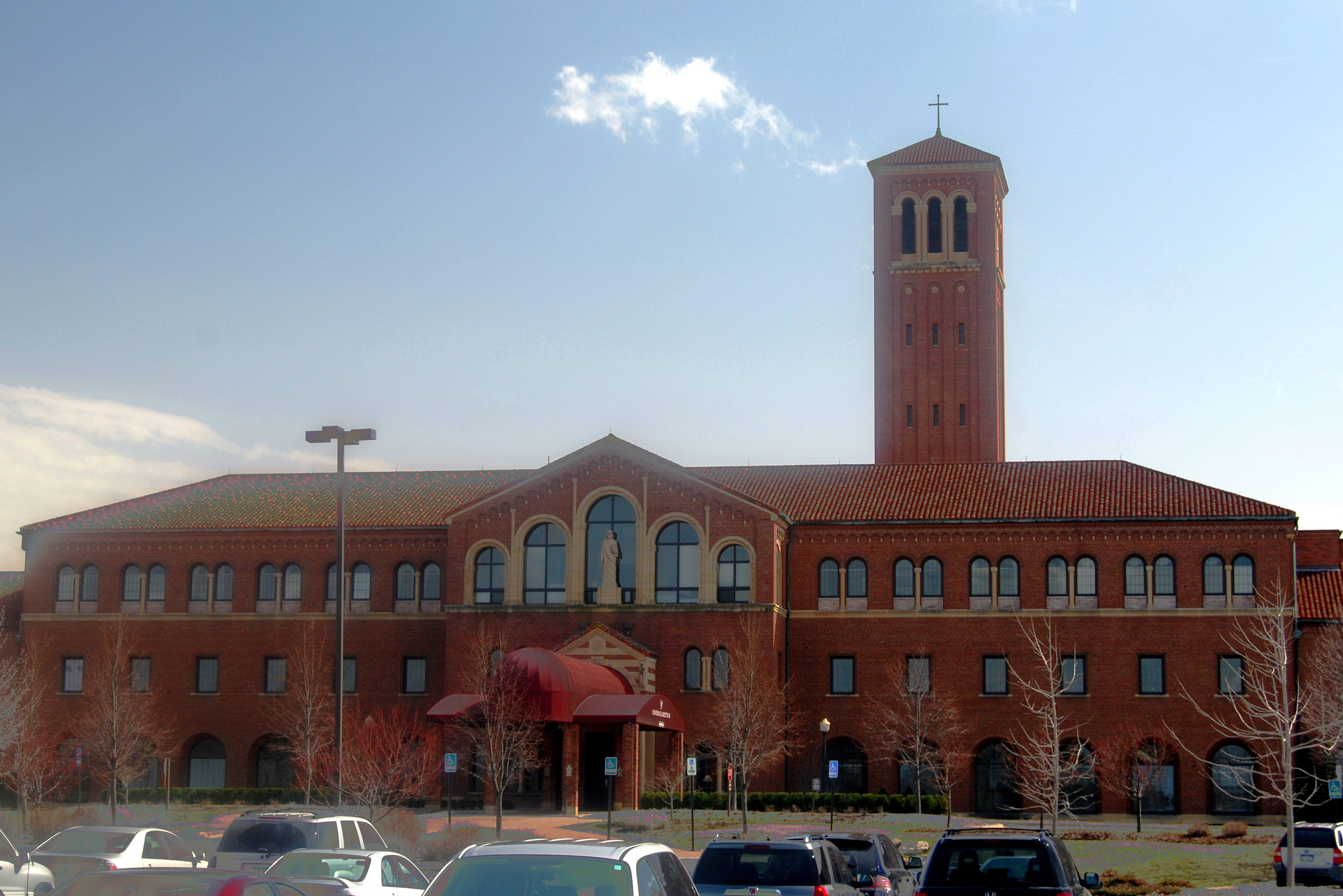
The Inn at St. John, formerly St. John's Provincial Seminary

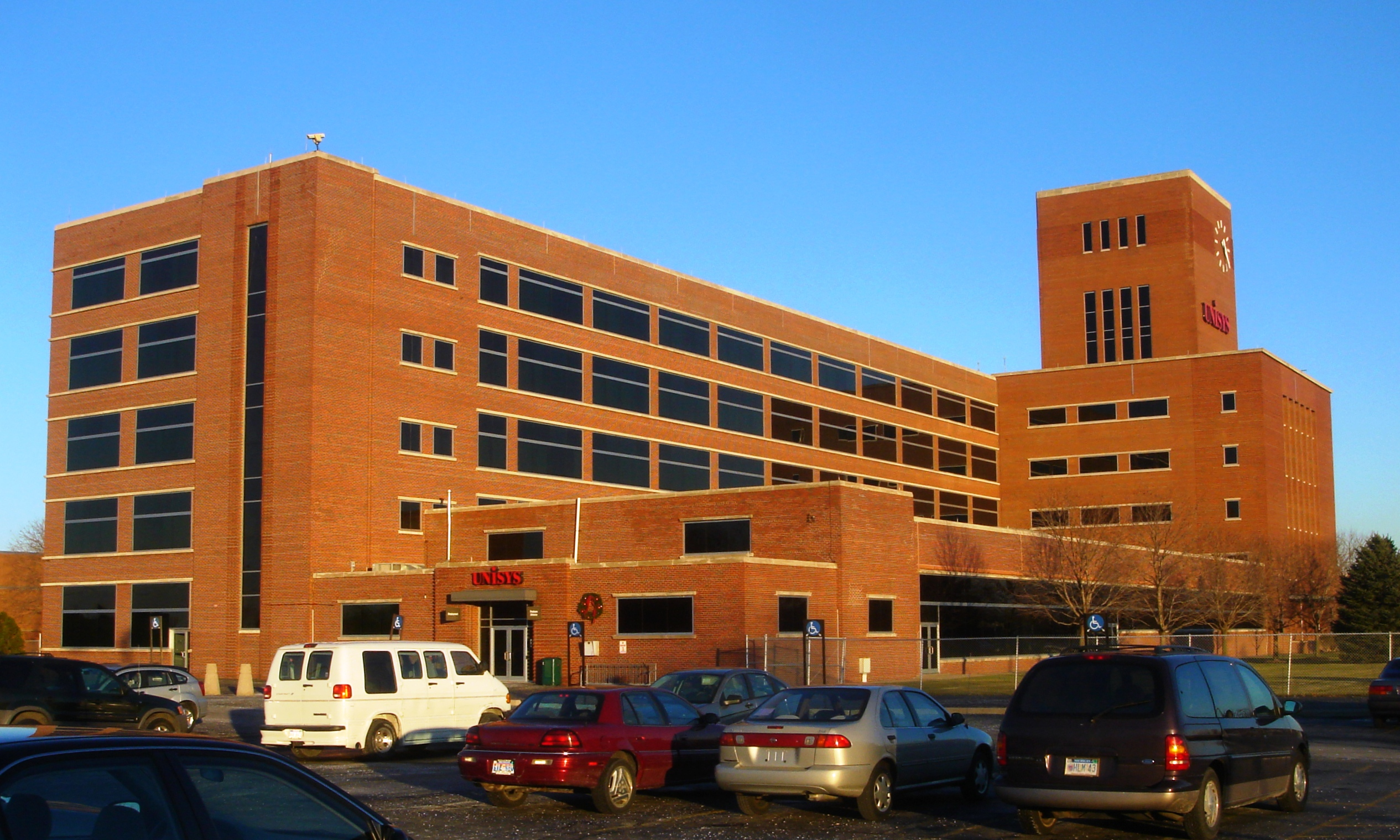
Burroughs Payment Systems

The Plymouth Whalers of the OHL played their home games in Compuware Arena.
