= Rally Madison FC =

Soccer club in Madison, Wisconsin

- Founded: August 2023 (3 years ago)
- Ground: Breese Stevens Field; Madison, Wisconsin
- Owner: Big Top Events
- Chairman: Conor Caloia
- Manager: Liz Lawrence
- Coach: Giuliano Oliviero
- League: USL W League
- Website: rallymadisonfc.com

Rally Madison FC is a women's soccer club based in Madison, Wisconsin. Owned by Big Top Events, it is the sister club of Forward Madison FC, and plays in the USL W League, starting in the 2026 season. The club also holds franchise rights for a future team in the professional USL Super League. Its home ground is Breese Stevens Field.

== History ==
Big Top Events were awarded franchise rights for the burgeoning USL Super League in 2023. Though the planned professional team was supported by Madison's municipal government, who sought a $4 million grant from the Wisconsin government to upgrade Breese Stevens Field, the club failed to procure the necessary upgrades to meet U.S. Soccer's Division I standards.

Rally Madison's entry into the amateur USL W League was announced at halftime during a Forward Madison USL League One game in August 2025. Prior to the club's branding launch at The Sylvee in December, it operated under the placeholder name USL W League Madison, and hired Giuliano Oliviero from the Milwaukee Wave as its first ever head coach. Among the club's first ever player signings were Edgewood High School of the Sacred Heart record goalscorer Sonoma Bever, Muskego High School defender Elsa Maurer, Milwaukee Panthers forward Addison Werth, and Rockford Raptors goalkeeper Malia Zillman.

== Culture and branding ==
The name Rally Madison FC was chosen through public consultation, and honours both the women's suffrage movement, and Wisconsin's ratification of the nineteenth amendment – the first state to do so. The club's crest was designed by Madison-based advertising agency Shine United, and depicts a bust of Wisconsin, the statue atop the Wisconsin State Capitol, adorned with a crown depicting the Flag of Madison's cross. The club's main supporters' group is The Flock, who originate from Forward Madison.

== Stadium ==
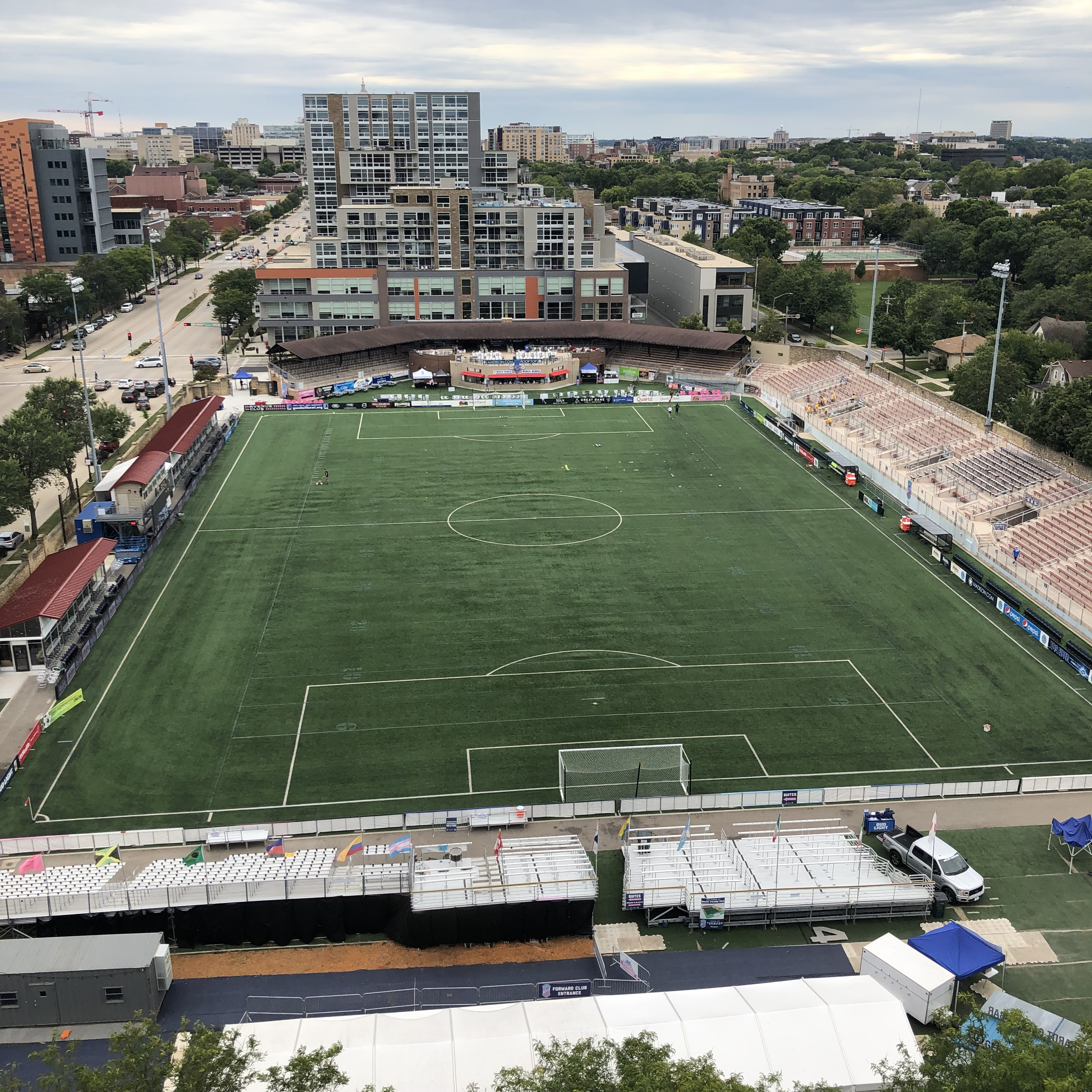
The club's home ground is Breese Stevens Field (pictured).

Rally Madison's home ground is Breese Stevens Field in downtown Madison, Wisconsin, which they share with Forward Madison. Its first season of play in 2026 will coincide with the stadium's hundredth anniversary, opened in May 1926.

== Organization ==
Rally Madison is owned by Big Top Events, who also own the Forward Madison men's soccer team and the Madison Mallards collegiate summer baseball team. Conor Caloia leads the club through his role as chief operating officer, while Liz Lawrence manages the club as its technical director.

== Team ==
Giuliano Oliviero serves as Rally Madison's head coach, while Tenzin Rampa and technical director Liz Lawrence serve as assistant coaches. William Banahene serves as its goalkeeper coach.

Note: Flags indicate national team as defined under FIFA eligibility rules; some limited exceptions apply. Players may hold more than one non-FIFA nationality. Squad correct as of December 12, 2025.

No.	Pos.	Nation	Player
—	GK	USA	Malia Zillman
—	FW	USA	Sonoma Bever
—	FW	USA	Addison Werth
—	MF	USA	Jessica Fernau
—	DF	USA	Else Maurer

== Seasons ==
List of Rally Madison FC seasons
Season	League	Pld	W	D	L	GF	GA	GD	Pos	Playoffs
2026	USLW	12	4	1	7	12	27	–15	6th, Heartland Division	Did not qualify

== See also ==
- List of professional sports teams in Wisconsin
- List of soccer clubs in the United States
- List of United Soccer League clubs
