= Worteh Sampson =

Liberian soccer forward (born 1981)

Personal information
- Date of birth: 25 June 1981 (age 45)
- Place of birth: Monrovia, Liberia
- Height: 6 ft 0 in (1.83 m)
- Position: Forward

College career
Years	Team	Apps	(Gls)
2001–2002	Schoolcraft Ocelots		
2003–2004	Madonna Crusaders		

Senior career*
Years	Team	Apps	(Gls)
2006	Windsor Border Stars		
2006–2009	Detroit Ignition (indoor)	28	(18)
2008	Charlotte Eagles	11	(0)
2010–2011	Baltimore Blast (indoor)	14	(8)
2011–2015	Detroit Waza (indoor)	30	(29)

Managerial career
- 2009–2015: Marygrove Mustangs (asst.)
- 2015–2018: Marygrove Mustangs (women's)
- 2018: AAFC Lumberjills (co-head coach)
- 2019–: Michigan–Dearborn Wolverines
- * Club domestic league appearances and goals

Worteh Sampson (born 25 June 1981) is a Liberian soccer coach who is currently the head coach of the University of Michigan–Dearborn men's soccer team.

== College ==
In 2001, Sampson received a scholarship to play at Schoolcraft College in Michigan before receiving another 2-year grant to play at Madonna University in Michigan beginning in 2003. He "was named to the All-Conference First Team twice, while also being named the Conference Player of the Year in 2003." He graduated in 2005 with a bachelor's degree in Marketing.

== Professional ==
Sampson began his career in 2006 with Windsor Border Stars of the Canadian Soccer League. He recorded his first goal for the club on September 9, 2006, in a match against London City. He scored his second goal the following match against Caribbean Selects. He helped Windsor clinch a postseason berth by finishing third in the National Division. In the playoffs, he recorded a goal in a 2–1 victory over Oakville Blue Devils. In the second round of the postseason the club was eliminated from the competition after losing to Serbian White Eagles.

The Detroit Ignition of Major Indoor Soccer League (MISL) drafted Sampson in 2006. He played for the Ignition for three straight seasons, starting with 2006–07. For the 2008–09 season, the team played in the Xtreme Soccer League.

In 2008, Sampson signed with the Charlotte Eagles of the USL Second Division.

Sampson played the 2010–11 MISL season for the Baltimore Blast, scoring 8 goals and 8 assists in 14 regular games. In 2011, he moved to the Detroit Waza.

== Coaching ==
In 2019, Sampson was hired as the head coach for University of Michigan–Dearborn's men's soccer team, after coaching at many other levels for several years.

== Career team achievements ==
- 1st Place in Michigan with Schoolcraft College 2001.
- Midwest Champions with Schoolcraft College 2001.
- 6th Place in the National Division 1 (NJCAA) Final Tournament in Tyler, Texas with Schoolcraft College.
- 2nd Place in Michigan with Schoolcraft College 2002.
- Midwest Champions with Schoolcraft College 2002.
- 3rd Place in the National Division 1 (NJCAA) Final Tournament in Tyler, Texas with Schoolcraft College.

== Career personal achievements ==
- 2003 NAIA (WHAC) player of the year with Madonna University
- 2003 NAIA All Region and All All American
- 2003 Madonna University Offensive Player of the year
- 2003 Runner up Madonna University Athlete of the year
- 2004 NAIA All Region and All American
- 2004 Madonna University Player of the year
