= Steve Morris (soccer) =

Scottish footballer and coach

Personal information
- Date of birth: 2 November 1967 (age 58)
- Place of birth: Glasgow, Scotland
- Positions: Forward; midfielder

College career
Years	Team	Apps	(Gls)
1986–1990	Syracuse Orange	64	(43)

Senior career*
Years	Team	Apps	(Gls)
1991	Hamilton Steelers	21	(1)
1991–1992	Wichita Wings (indoor)	38	(9)
1992	London Lasers	13	(2)
1992–2001	Milwaukee Wave (indoor)	325	(190)
1995	Chicago Stingers		
- Rockford Raptors
1997–1998	Milwaukee Rampage	23	(6)

Managerial career
- 2003: Milwaukee Wave United (assistant)
- 2003–2005: Milwaukee Wave (assistant)
- 2006–2008: Chicago Storm
- 2017–2022: Chicago FC United (MLS Next)
- 2022–: Bavarian FC (MLS Next)
- * Club domestic league appearances and goals

Steve Morris (born 2 November 1967) is a Scottish retired association football player and coach. Morris spent most of his career with the Milwaukee Wave of the National Professional Soccer League, but he also played in the USISL A-League and the first Major Indoor Soccer League.

== Player ==
=== Youth ===
Born in Scotland, Morris moved to Canada with his family before eventually settling in Evanston, Illinois. Morris graduated from Evanston Township High School where he was the 1986 Illinois High School Soccer Player of the Year. In 1997, Evanston Township High School inducted Morris into its Athletic Hall of Fame. In 1986, Morris entered Syracuse University. He was the 1986 Syracuse Orangeman Rookie of the Year, but low grades led to the loss of his athletic eligibility. He enrolled as a part-time student for the 1987–1988 academic year and raised his grades enough to return full-time in the fall of 1988. He rejoined the soccer team and played three consecutive seasons, setting numerous school scoring records. He graduated in 1991. In October 1993, the NCAA stripped Syracuse of all thirty-three victories during Morris' last three season when it was discovered that Syracuse head coach Tim Hankinson had violated NCAA rules by co-signing a loan with Morris.

Morris is one of 22 college players to be part of the 40-40 club, having both 40 goals and 40 assists in their college career.

=== Professional ===
In 1991, Morris trained with the Doncaster Rovers in England. He never appears in a league match. Morris then moved to Canada where he played for the Hamilton Steelers of the Canadian Soccer League. That fall, Morris began his extensive indoor career with the Wichita Wings of the Major Indoor Soccer League. On 17 December 1992, Morris signed with the Milwaukee Wave of the National Professional Soccer League. Morris played for the Wave every winter until his retirement in 2001. During those years, the Wave won the 1998, 2000 and 2001 championships. In 2002, the Wave retired Morris' jersey number. In addition to his indoor career, Morris also played for the Chicago Stingers in the 1995 USISL Professional League and the Rockford Raptors. On 5 August 1997, Morris signed with the Milwaukee Rampage of the USISL A-League. Morris won the league title with the Rampage that season.

== Coach ==
In 2003, Morris served as an assistant coach with the Milwaukee Wave United of the USL A-League. That fall, he joined the Milwaukee Wave as an assistant for two seasons. In August 2006, the Chicago Storm hired Morris as head coach.

Morris joined Chicago FC United in 2017 and was the Academy Program Director for the club's MLS Next program.

Morris joined Bavarian United Soccer Club in 2022 as the Executive Director.
