= 2014–15 Milwaukee Wave season =

Milwaukee Wave
2014–15 MASL season
- Owner: Mike Zimmerman
- Head Coach: Giuliano Oliviero
- Arena: UW–Milwaukee Panther Arena; 400 W Kilbourn Avenue; Milwaukee, Wisconsin 53203
- Major Arena Soccer League: 2nd, Central (regular season)
- Top goalscorer: Ian Bennett (36 goals, 5 assists)
- Highest home attendance: 5,138 (February 21 vs. Detroit Waza)
- Lowest home attendance: 1,888 (December 20 vs. Tulsa Revolution)
- Average home league attendance: 2,961 (10 games)

The 2014–15 Milwaukee Wave season was the thirty-first season of the Milwaukee Wave professional indoor soccer club. The Wave, a Central Division team in the Major Arena Soccer League, played their home games in the UW–Milwaukee Panther Arena in Milwaukee, Wisconsin.

The team was led by head coach Giuliano Oliviero and assistant coach Nick Vorberg. The team earned a 13–7 record in the regular season, placing second in the Central Division and qualifying for the playoffs. The Wave defeated the Chicago Mustangs in the Division Semi-Final then lost to the Missouri Comets in the Division Final.

== Season summary ==
The Wave opened the season with 5 consecutive road games, starting with a road win over the St. Louis Ambush. They split the next four games before a home opener victory over St. Louis. The Wave went back on the road for a two-game weekend of losses to the Baltimore Blast before beginning a 6-game homestand. They won 4 of 6, losing only to the Missouri Comets and Baltimore. (The Wave lost both regular season matchups against Missouri and all three against Baltimore. By contrast, they won all four games against Detroit Waza and all three against St. Louis. Their only division rivalry that was not a sweep was the Chicago Mustangs with a 1–1 split of the season series.) Milwaukee finished the season strong with 5 wins in their last 6 games to amass a 13–7 record and second place in the Central Division. In the Division Semi-Finals, the Wave traded at-home wins with Chicago before edging them 2–1 in overtime in the tie-breaking mini-game. Milwaukee faced the unbeaten Missouri Comets for the division championship on March 12 and lost 2–8.

== Off-field moves ==
After the 2013–14 season, the team announced that it was leaving the third incarnation of the Major Indoor Soccer League along with five other MISL teams and joining the teams of Professional Arena Soccer League, which was soon rebranded as the MASL. The other teams in the MASL's Central Division are former MISL clubs Missouri Comets and St. Louis Ambush, plus PASL clubs Chicago Mustangs, Tulsa Revolution, and Wichita B-52s.

In March 2014, following the changes in league and team ownership, head coach Keith Tozer left the Wave after 22 years with the team. Milwaukee's WITI-TV described the departure as one of the biggest local sports stories of 2014. The new ownership group, dubbed MKE Sports & Entertainment and led by Michael Zimmerman, was formally announced in April 2014.

In December 2014, just before their first home game of the season, the Wave replaced their traditional green artificial turf with a black turf to match the team's colors and marketing strategy. Reception by fans and the press was mixed but generally positive.

In late January 2015, the team told the Milwaukee Business Journal that it was losing money and that it would seek a renegotiation of its arena lease after the season. Ownership acknowledged that average attendance at games was down but noted that "the previous owner was giving away tickets" and that the Wave are "actually selling more tickets but fewer fans are in the seats".

== Roster moves ==
Seeking fresh talent, the team held an open tryout in September 2014. The Wave announced their first completed roster for the season on November 7, just one day before the season began.

== Schedule ==
Win Loss

=== Regular season ===
Game	Day	Date	Kickoff	Opponent	Results		Location	Attendance
Game	Day	Date	Kickoff	Opponent	Score	Record	Location	Attendance
1	Saturday	November 8	7:35pm	at St. Louis Ambush	W 8–4	1–0	Family Arena	6,679
2	Saturday	November 15	7:05pm	at Missouri Comets	L 7–9	1–1	Independence Events Center	5,812
3	Saturday	November 22	7:05pm	at Detroit Waza	W 4–0	2–1	Melvindale Civic Center	549
4	Friday	November 28	7:35pm	at St. Louis Ambush	W 8–4	3–1	Family Arena	4,719
5	Saturday	November 29	7:05pm	at Chicago Mustangs	L 4–5	3–2	Sears Centre	2,443
6	Saturday	December 6	6:05pm	St. Louis Ambush	W 9–3	4–2	UW–Milwaukee Panther Arena	3,209
7	Friday	December 12	7:35pm	at Baltimore Blast♠	L 8–13	4–3	Royal Farms Arena	6,421
8	Saturday	December 13	7:35pm	at Baltimore Blast♠	L 10–14	4–4	Royal Farms Arena	5,311
9	Saturday	December 20	1:05pm	Tulsa Revolution	W 9–3	5–4	UW–Milwaukee Panther Arena	1,888
10	Saturday	December 27	1:05pm	Detroit Waza	W 8–6	6–4	UW–Milwaukee Panther Arena	2,357
11	Wednesday	December 31	3:05pm	Missouri Comets	L 7–8 (SO)	6–5	UW–Milwaukee Panther Arena	3,148
12	Saturday	January 3	6:05pm	Rochester Lancers	W 7–4	7–5	UW–Milwaukee Panther Arena	2,357
13	Saturday	January 10	6:05pm	Chicago Mustangs	W 8–5	8–5	UW–Milwaukee Panther Arena	2,960
14	Friday	January 16	7:05pm	Baltimore Blast	L 3–5	8–6	UW–Milwaukee Panther Arena	2,317
15	Saturday	January 24	6:05pm	at Detroit Waza	W 9–4	9–6	Melvindale Civic Center	641
16	Sunday	January 25	3:05pm	Wichita B-52s	W 12–4	10–6	UW–Milwaukee Panther Arena	2,874
17	Friday	February 6	7:05pm	at Tulsa Revolution	W 13–3	11–6	Expo Square Pavilion	433
18	Saturday	February 7	7:05pm	at Wichita B-52s	W 14–12	12–6	Hartman Arena	1,957
19	Saturday	February 14	1:05pm	Syracuse Silver Knights	L 9–10 (OT)	12–7	UW–Milwaukee Panther Arena	3,370
20	Saturday	February 21	6:05pm	Detroit Waza	W 12–6	13–7	UW–Milwaukee Panther Arena	5,138

♠ Game played with multi-point scoring (most goals worth 2 points and select goals worth 3 points).

=== Post-season ===
Game	Day	Date	Kickoff	Opponent	Results		Location	Attendance
Game	Day	Date	Kickoff	Opponent	Score	Record	Location	Attendance
Division Playoff #1	Thursday	February 26	7:35pm	at Chicago Mustangs	L 3–6	0–1	Sears Centre	1,443
Division Playoff #2	Saturday	March 7	3:05pm	Chicago Mustangs	W 9–2	1–1	UW–Milwaukee Panther Arena	2,888
Division Playoff #3	Saturday	March 7	6:05pm	Chicago Mustangs^{1}	W 2–1 (OT)	2–1	UW–Milwaukee Panther Arena	2,888
Division Final	Thursday	March 12	7:05pm	at Missouri Comets	L 2–8	2–2	Independence Events Center	3,441

^{1} Mini-game played as a tie-breaker.

== Awards and honors ==
On March 13, the MASL announced the finalists for its major year-end awards. These nominees included Milwaukee coach Giuliano Oliviero for Coach of the Year.
