= Ed Kalegi =

American actor

Ed Kalegi is an American voice actor, radio personality, host, and actor based in the New York City area. He currently serves as the host of Chatterbinge a weekly radio show and podcast, co-hosted with actress Caryn Richman, which is syndicated nationally by Audio1. Chatterbinge can be heard on all audio podcast platforms and on the Chatterbinge YouTube channel. The show is a mix of celebrity interviews and lifestyle segments with Caryn Richman. Kalegi is also the author of the book "It Was Great to Say Hello to...A Curious Radio Host's Conversations with Actors, Authors, and Newsmakers." The book was published by Rand-Smith Books in 2024. Prior to Chatterbinge, he was the host of The Weekend with Ed Kalegi national radio show which aired from 2014 to 2025. He also spent over a decade as the afternoon Traffic/Weather/Sports personality on WBBR (Bloomberg 1130) Radio in New York City. From 2007 to 2011, He was the public address announcer of the Staten Island Yankees, a minor league affiliate of the New York Yankees as well as the public address announcer of the New Jersey Ironmen of the Xtreme Soccer League and a public address announcer for the New Jersey Devils of the National Hockey League.

Kalegi has co-hosted events in New York City with Jon Stewart, Joan Rivers, Daisy Fuentes and Star Jones, along with sports celebrities Carl Banks and Darryl Strawberry, among others.

Kalegi appeared as the stadium announcer in the motion picture Sugar. He has also appeared in starring roles in the films Borrowed Dog and Angels. He appeared opposite Kevin Kline, Paul Dano, and Katie Holmes in "The Extra Man." Kalegi also played a radical talk radio host in the film "Blindfold."

On television, Kalegi has appeared in several shows including Law and Order SVU, Kings, "Fringe," and "Damages." In 2009, he hosted "In The Zone" on UBATV.com. He is a member of SAG-AFTRA.

He is heard in commercials, narrations, radio and TV imaging and audiobooks. In 2008, Kalegi was the voice of a PBS documentary on sculpture.

== Early life and career ==
Kalegi was born in Jersey City, New Jersey and raised in Edison, New Jersey. He attended Bishop George Ahr High School (now renamed St. Thomas Aquinas High School) in Edison and then Rutgers University.

Kalegi lives in Metuchen, New Jersey.
