= Lucio Gonzaga =

Brazilian footballer (born 1980)

Lúcio Gonzaga
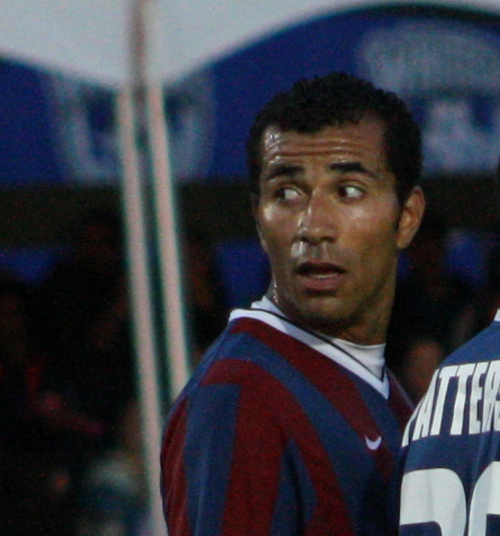

Personal information
- Full name: Lucio Luiz de Oliveira Gonzaga
- Date of birth: August 7, 1980 (age 46)
- Place of birth: São Paulo, Brazil
- Height: 5 ft 9 in (1.75 m)
- Position: Attacking midfielder

Team information
- Current team: Florida Tropics
- Number: 85

Youth career
- 1994: São Caetano
- 1995–1999: Juventus

Senior career*
Years	Team	Apps	(Gls)
2000–2002	RC Montevideo	51	(18)
2002–2003	Araxá	20	(0)
2003–2006	Rio Branco Andradas	44	(5)
2006–2007	São Caetano	10	(3)
2007	Baltimore Blast (indoor)	84	(62)
2008–2009	New Jersey Ironmen (indoor)	19	(23)
2009	Real Maryland Monarchs	7	(2)
2009–2015	Baltimore Blast (indoor)	91	(69)
2010	Crystal Palace Baltimore	19	(1)
2015–2016	Harrisburg Heat (indoor)	9	(5)
2016	Ontario Fury (indoor)	6	(4)
2016–2018	Harrisburg Heat (indoor)	38	(36)
2017–	Christos FC O-30s		
2018–2019	Utica City (indoor)	20	(11)
2019–2022	Florida Tropics (indoor)	17	(12)
2022	Utica City (indoor)	5	(2)
2022–	Florida Tropics (indoor)	5	(0)

Managerial career
- 2018–: Christos FC (assistant)
- * Club domestic league appearances and goals as of 18 January 2023

Lucio Luiz de Oliveira Gonzaga (born August 7, 1980), known as just Lúcio Gonzaga, is a Brazilian soccer player who currently plays for Florida Tropics SC in the Major Arena Soccer League.

== Career ==
=== South America ===
Gonzaga was part of the youth setups at local Brazilian teams São Caetano and Juventus, and spent his early professional career playing in the lower divisions in Brazil and Uruguay, playing for RC Montevideo, Araxá, Rio Branco Andradas and São Caetano.

=== North America ===
Gonzaga moved to the United States in 2007 when he signed with indoor soccer team Baltimore Blast. After helping the Blast to the MISL championship, he moved in 2008 to the XSL's New Jersey Ironmen. Lucio spent one season with the Ironmen, scoring 23 goals in 19 games. He was named the XSL Offensive Player of the Year. Gonzaga returned to Baltimore and the Blast in 2009.

Gonzaga gained his first taste of outdoor soccer in the United States in 2009 when he played with the Real Maryland Monarchs in the USL Second Division. On February 11, 2010 Crystal Palace Baltimore announced the signing of Gonzaga to a contract for the 2010 season. On September 14, 2010, Lucio signed a two-year contract with the Baltimore Blast.

Gonzaga signed with Florida Tropics SC on December 3, 2019.

== Outdoor career statistics (in the United States) ==
(correct as of 15 August 2010)

Club	Season	League			Cup			Play-Offs			Total		
Club	Season	Apps	Goals	Assists	Apps	Goals	Assists	Apps	Goals	Assists	Apps	Goals	Assists
Real Maryland Monarchs	2009	2	99	99	99	99	99	-	-	-	99	99	99
Total	2009	7	2	1	0	0	0	-	-	-	7	2	1
Crystal Palace Baltimore	2010	18		99	99	99	0	-	-	-	19	1	1
Total	2010–present	18	1	1	1	0	0	-	-	-	19	1	1
Career Total	2009–present	25	3	2	1	0	0	-	-	-	26	3	2
