= Jamar Beasley =

American soccer player (born 1979)

Personal information
- Date of birth: October 11, 1979 (age 47)
- Place of birth: Fort Wayne, Indiana, U.S.
- Height: 5 ft 10 in (1.78 m)
- Position: Forward

Senior career*
Years	Team	Apps	(Gls)
1998–2001	New England Revolution	41	(3)
1998	→ MLS Pro-40 (loan)	1	(0)
1999	→ Boston Bulldogs (loan)	1	(0)
1999	→ New Hampshire Phantoms (loan)	1	(1)
2000	→ MLS Pro-40 (loan)	4	(2)
2001	Chicago Fire	18	(4)
2002	Puteolana		
2003	Indiana Blast	21	(6)
2003	Carolina Dynamo	1	(0)
2003	Charleston Battery	2	(0)
2004	Milwaukee Wave United	22	(1)
2003–2005	Kansas City Comets (indoor)	61	(53)
2005–2006	St. Louis Steamers (indoor)	30	(33)
2006–2008	Detroit Ignition (indoor)	29	(40)
2008–2010	Rockford Rampage (indoor)	17	(8)
2010	Kansas City Wizards	0	(0)
2010–2012	Missouri Comets (indoor)	?	(20)
2011–2012	Wichita Wings (indoor)	22	(21)
2012–2013	Syracuse Silver Knights (indoor)	15	(6)
2013–2014	St. Louis Ambush (indoor)	0	(0)
2014–2015	Seattle Impact FC (indoor)	4	(5)
2014–2015	Ontario Fury (indoor)	7	(13)
2015–2016	Tacoma Stars (indoor)	6	(2)
2016	Cedar Rapids Rampage (indoor)	3	(1)

International career^{‡}
1999	United States U20		
2004	United States futsal		
- * Club domestic league appearances and goals as of 23 January 2019 ‡ National team caps and goals as of 2 July 2007

Jamar Beasley (born October 11, 1979) is an American soccer player.

== Career ==
Beasley began his professional career in 1998, as a member Major League Soccer's Project-40, directly out of High School (South Side High School). In doing so, he became the first player in MLS history to sign with the league directly from high school. On February 25, 1998, he was allocated by MLS to the New England Revolution. At the time, Beasley was the youngest player to sign with MLS, a record since broken many times over. On August 14, 1998, Beasley officially joined the Revolution, after returning from duty with the U.S. U-20 National Team. Beasley made his Revolution debut on August 22, 1998, coming on as a 72nd minute substitution for Richard Goulooze. Beasley rejoined the Revolution after participating in the 1999 FIFA U-20 World Cup in Nigeria on April 27, 1999. He earned his first start on May 23, 1999, in a loss to the LA Galaxy.

Beasley's biggest contributions to the Revolution came during the 2000 New England Revolution season, in which he recorded 3 goals and 3 assists in 19 appearances (6 starts). He was named MLS Player of the Week in week 13 following his brace in the Revolution's 3–0 victory over the San Jose Earthquakes. The Revolution squared off against the Chicago Fire in the 2000 MLS Cup Playoffs. The matchup saw Jamar face off against his brother, who was then playing for the Fire. The Revolution were defeated 6–0 in the deciding match of the series.

On April 10, 2001, the Revolution traded Beasley to the Chicago Fire for a conditional pick in the 2002 MLS SuperDraft. After being traded to the Chicago Fire, Beasley was a regular during the 2001 season alongside his brother. He would score a crucial tying goal for Chicago against Dallas in the second game of a quarterfinal playoff series that 2001 Major League Soccer season. After reduced playing time in 2002, Beasley went to the second division before signing with the indoor Missouri Comets of the MISL II for the 2003–2004 season, where he would go on to win MISL Rookie of the Year. After years of success with various MISL teams, Beasley had a dominant year in 2006–2007, leading the Detroit Ignition to the MISL Championship Series and winning the MISL MVP Award.

After returning to MLS in 2010 with the Kansas City Wizards, Beasley was signed on November 11, 2010 (just one day before the 2010–2011 season) by the Missouri Comets of the MISL. Beasley was an offensive force all season-long for the team. He finished 3rd in the league in scoring with 54 points and tied for 3rd in total goals with 20. Beasley also had the second most game-winning goals on the year with three. Following the season he was named 2nd team All-MISL.

Beasley then joined the newly reformed Wichita Wings for their 2011-2012 expansion season, where he would go on to finish as their top goal scorer with 22 goals in 24 games played. However, this would begin a journeyman phase of his career, as he would leave Wichita after just one season.

Beasley was picked up by the Ontario Fury for the second half of the 2014–2015 season and enjoyed a career resurgence, with his final professional hat-trick and final MASL Team of the Week nod, en route to the playoffs, where he would score two goals in a first-round loss to the Las Vegas Legends.

After moving to the Tacoma Stars for 2015-2016 and seeing diminished playing time, Beasley would sign for the 2016-2017 Cedar Rapids Rampage in their second year in the MASL. Having rotated in and out of the squad, Beasley would score a goal in his final professional appearance, the first goal in a 6–3 win at the St. Louis Ambush on December 18, 2016. He was an unused substitute on December 31, 2016, before being released and retiring at the end of the season.

== Personal life ==
Jamar's brother DaMarcus Beasley also is a professional soccer player, having played for the Los Angeles Galaxy, Chicago Fire, PSV Eindhoven, Manchester City, Rangers F.C., Hannover 96, Puebla, and Houston Dynamo as well as the United States national team who he has represented at four World Cups.

== National team ==
He appeared at the World Youth Championship in Nigeria with the U20 United States national team, but has enjoyed more success with the US Futsal Team than with the full-age national team. In 2008, Beasley represented the US at the Futsal World Cup in Brazil.

== Honors ==
=== Club ===
- St. Louis Steamers
  - Major Indoor Soccer League: 2005-2006 Runner-Up :
- Detroit Ignition
  - Major Indoor Soccer League: 2006-2007 Runner-Up :

=== Individual ===
- Kansas City Comets
  - MISL 2003-04 Rookie of the Year:
- Detroit Ignition
  - MISL 2006-07 Most Valuable Player:
