= Mike Custer =

American soccer player and coach

Personal information
- Date of birth: August 18, 1956
- Place of birth: Overland Park, Kansas, United States
- Date of death: May 18, 2008 (aged 51)
- Place of death: Texas, United States
- Height: 5 ft 7 in (1.70 m)
- Position: Forward

College career
Years	Team	Apps	(Gls)
1975–1979	Ottawa Braves		

Senior career*
Years	Team	Apps	(Gls)
1979–1981	Wichita Wings (indoor)	45	(3)
1983–1984	Memphis Americans (indoor)	6	(0)

Managerial career
- 1986–1987: Milwaukee Wave
- * Club domestic league appearances and goals

Mike Custer was an American soccer forward who played professionally in the Major Indoor Soccer League and coached in the American Indoor Soccer Association.

== Player ==
=== Youth ===
Custer graduated from Shawnee Mission North High School. He attended Ottawa University where he set the school's season records for goals (28) and points (67). He is a member of the Ottawa University 1980-1989 All Decade Team and was named the Player of the Decade.

=== Professional ===
In 1979, Custer left Ottawa to attend an open tryout with the Wichita Wings of the Major Indoor Soccer League. Custer won a contract and spent two seasons with the Wings. In 1983, he played six games with the Memphis Americans.

== Executive ==
From 1985 to January 1986, Custer served as operations director for the Dallas Sidekicks. On January 12, 1986, Custer became the head coach of the Milwaukee Wave of the National Professional Soccer League. The Wave fired him on January 18, 1987. Custer then became an executive with the Louisville Thunder.

== Personal ==
In July 1996, Custer was convicted of three counts of Indecency With a Child (by contact) in Dallas County, Texas. After his release from prison, he worked as the general manager for Goffs Hamburgers on Hillcrest Rd. until the time of his death.
