= Giuliano Oliviero =

Canadian former soccer midfielder (born 1974)

Personal information
- Full name: Giuliano Oliviero
- Date of birth: February 26, 1974 (age 52)
- Place of birth: New Westminster, Canada
- Height: 6 ft 0 in (1.83 m)
- Position: Defender

Team information
- Current team: Rally Madison FC (head coach)

College career
Years	Team	Apps	(Gls)
- UBC Thunderbirds

Senior career*
Years	Team	Apps	(Gls)
1990	Edmonton Brick Men	12	(0)
1992	London Lasers	13	(1)
1993	Winnipeg Fury		
1995–1996	Vancouver 86ers		
1995–1997	Milwaukee Wave (indoor)	77	(54)
1997–1998	Montreal Impact	124	(18)
1999	Staten Island Vipers	22	(4)
2000–2002	Montreal Impact	66	(6)
2000–2001	Toronto Thunderhawks (indoor)	40	(43)
2001–2003	Cleveland Crunch/Force (indoor)	73	(63)
2003	Toronto Lynx	8	(1)
2004	Milwaukee Wave United	9	(1)
2005–2014	Milwaukee Wave (indoor)	251	(143)

International career^{‡}
1990	Canada U-20	4	(0)
1995	Canada	1	(0)

Managerial career
- 2016–2024: Milwaukee Wave
- 2025–: Rally Madison FC
- * Club domestic league appearances and goals as of March 19, 2010 ‡ National team caps and goals as of September 16, 2006

Giuliano Oliviero (born February 26, 1974) is a Canadian former soccer midfielder and currently the head coach of Rally Madison FC in the USL W League.

== Outdoor career ==
=== Club ===
He first began to play professional soccer with the Edmonton Brick Men in 1990, he then had stints with London Lasers in 1992. In 1993, he played in the Canadian National Soccer Leaguewith the Winnipeg Fury. He signed with the Vancouver 86ers where he recorded 9 goals and was named the A-League Rookie of the Year, and was named into the First Team All A-League selection. The same year he began his indoor career with the Milwaukee Wave United where he finished fourth on the team in scoring (89 points) and assists (24), and was runner-up for NPSL Rookie of the Year and was named to the NPSL's All-Rookie First Team.

In 1997, Oliviero joined the Montreal Impact, and was with the club until 2002 for all but one season. His best season with the Impact was 1998 when he recorded 27 points on 8 goals and 11 assists. He tallied a total of 18 goals in 115 games. Oliveiro played for Staten Island Vipers in 1999 when the Impact were not in operation.

In 2003, Oliviero joined Montreal's rival the Toronto Lynx, leaving the team with 115 games played and 18 career goals for the Impact. His signing along with Brian Ashton was announced on April 10, 2003. During his tenure with the Lynx he played eight games and scored one goal, and assisted Toronto to finish second in the standings for the Voyageurs Cup. He played his last outdoor season with the Milwaukee Wave United in 2004, but after the conclusion of the 2004 season the franchise would fold from. In total he recorded 36 goals and 111 points in the USL First Division.

=== International ===
Oliviero played for the Canada U-20 men's national soccer team in 1991 and 1992 and made his senior debut for the Canada national soccer team in an October 1995 friendly match against Chile. That game would remain his only international.

== Indoor career ==
In 2003, he began his second stint with the Wave where he played his 100th career regular season game with Wave on 3/14 vs. Baltimore. The following season, he was the team's second leading scorer with 40 points on 17 goals and 23 assists and helped the team win their first League Title.

== Personal life ==
Oliviero is coaching director and coach of SC Waukesha Boys U-14.
