= Mark Pulisic =

American former soccer forward (born 1968)

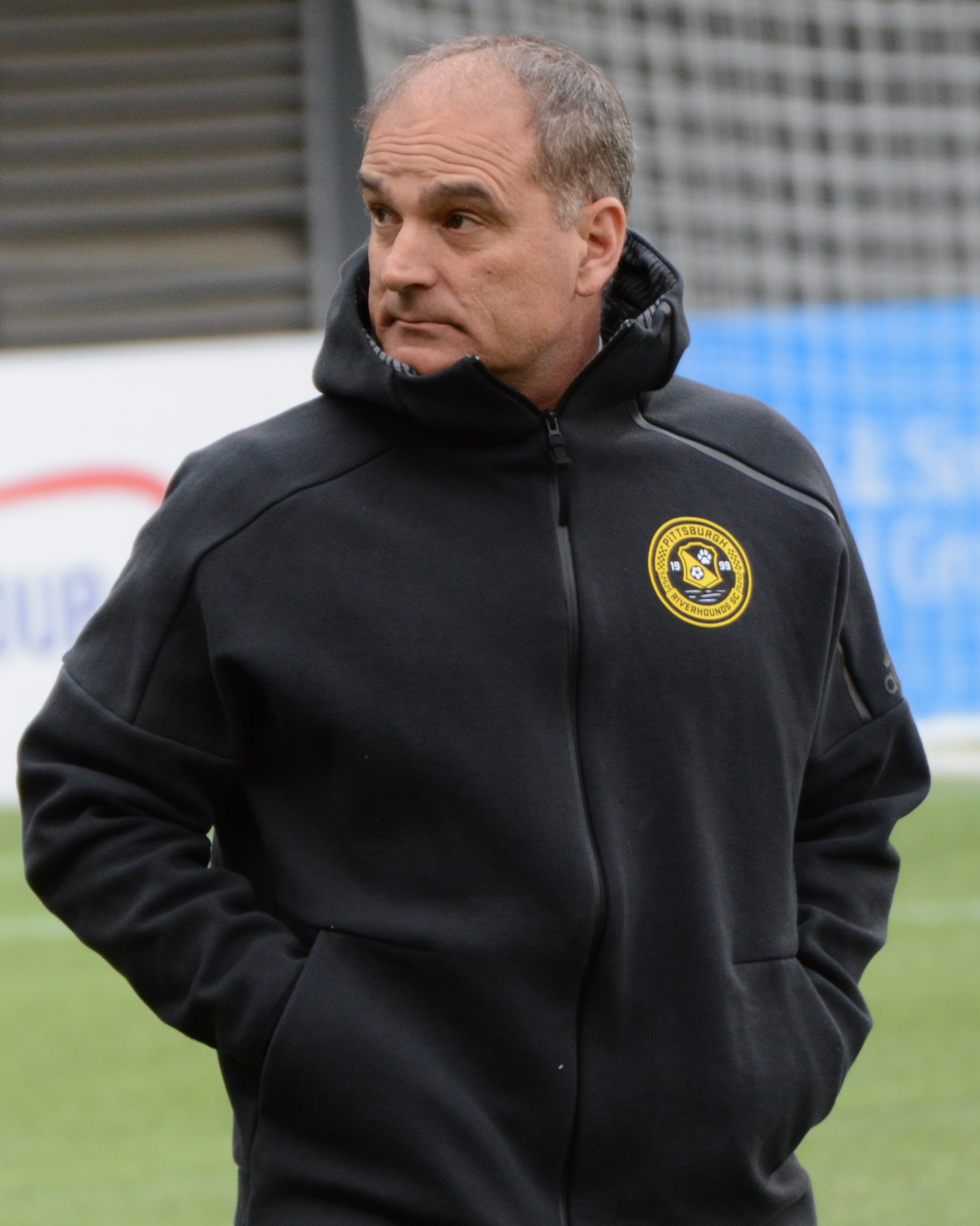
- Pulisic in 2018

Personal information
- Full name: Mark Pulisic
- Date of birth: September 20, 1968 (age 58)
- Place of birth: Centereach, New York, United States
- Height: 5 ft 9 in (1.75 m)
- Position: Forward

College career
Years	Team	Apps	(Gls)
1986–1989	George Mason Patriots	73	(35)

Senior career*
Years	Team	Apps	(Gls)
1991–1999	Harrisburg Heat (indoor)	303	(296)

Managerial career
- 1993–2005: Lebanon Valley College (men)
- 1996–2005: Lebanon Valley College (women)
- 2003–2004: Harrisburg City Islanders (assistant)
- 2006–2007: Detroit Ignition
- 2015–2017: Borussia Dortmund (academy)
- 2017: Rochester Rhinos (assistant)
- 2018: Pittsburgh Riverhounds SC (assistant)
- * Club domestic league appearances and goals

Mark Pulisic (Croatian: Pulišić; born September 20, 1968) is an American former soccer player and coach. He played for the Harrisburg Heat for his entire professional career. He is the father of Christian Pulisic, who plays for AC Milan and the United States men's national team.

== College ==
Pulisic attended George Mason University, where he played soccer from 1986 to 1989. He finished with thirty-five career goals in 73 appearances. In 2012, he was voted into the George Mason Men's Soccer Hall of Fame.

== Harrisburg Heat ==
In 1991, Pulisic turned professional with the Harrisburg Heat of the National Professional Soccer League (NPSL). He remained with the Heat throughout his career, retiring from playing professionally in 1999. When he retired, the Heat honored him with a Mark Pulisic Night at the Farm Show Arena in Harrisburg, Pennsylvania. He was then inducted into the team's Hall of Fame, joining Bob Lilley, Richard Chinapoo, and Todd Smith.

== Coaching ==
In 1993, Lebanon Valley College hired Pulisic to begin a new chapter of the men's soccer program, where he coached until 2005, finishing with a record of 88-124-13. In 1996, Pulisic began coaching a new women's team program at the school as well. While with Lebanon Valley College, Pulisic also served as an assistant coach for the Harrisburg City Islanders of the USL in 2003 and 2004.

On April 19, 2006, the expansion Detroit Ignition of the Major Indoor Soccer League (MISL) hired Pulisic as the team's first coach. In April 2007, he was named the MISL Coach of the Year. On November 6, 2007, former Heat teammate Bob Lilley replaced Pulisic as head coach of the Ignition, moving Pulisic to the front office as director of soccer operations.

Pulisic relocated to Germany in 2015 after his son Christian was signed by Bundesliga club Borussia Dortmund, and was hired as a coach for Dortmund's U10 academy team. In early 2017, Pulisic returned to the United States, joining second division club Rochester Rhinos as an assistant coach under his former teammate and colleague Bob Lilley.

== Personal life ==
Mark Pulisic's father is originally from the island of Olib in Croatia.

Mark Pulisic is the father of AC Milan and U.S. men's national team player Christian Pulisic. In addition to Christian, he and his wife have two other children, a son and a daughter. His nephew Will Pulisic plays for MLS Next Pro club Minnesota United FC 2.

In a 2023 interview for ESPN, his son Christian Pulisic added that his paternal grandmother Johanna DiStefano was Sicilian, noting that "My dad, her son, has an Italian flag tattooed on his forearm."

== Honors ==
Individual

- MISL Coach of the Year: 2007
