= USA Hockey Arena =

Arena in Michigan, United States

Coordinates: 42°23′21″N 83°30′22″W

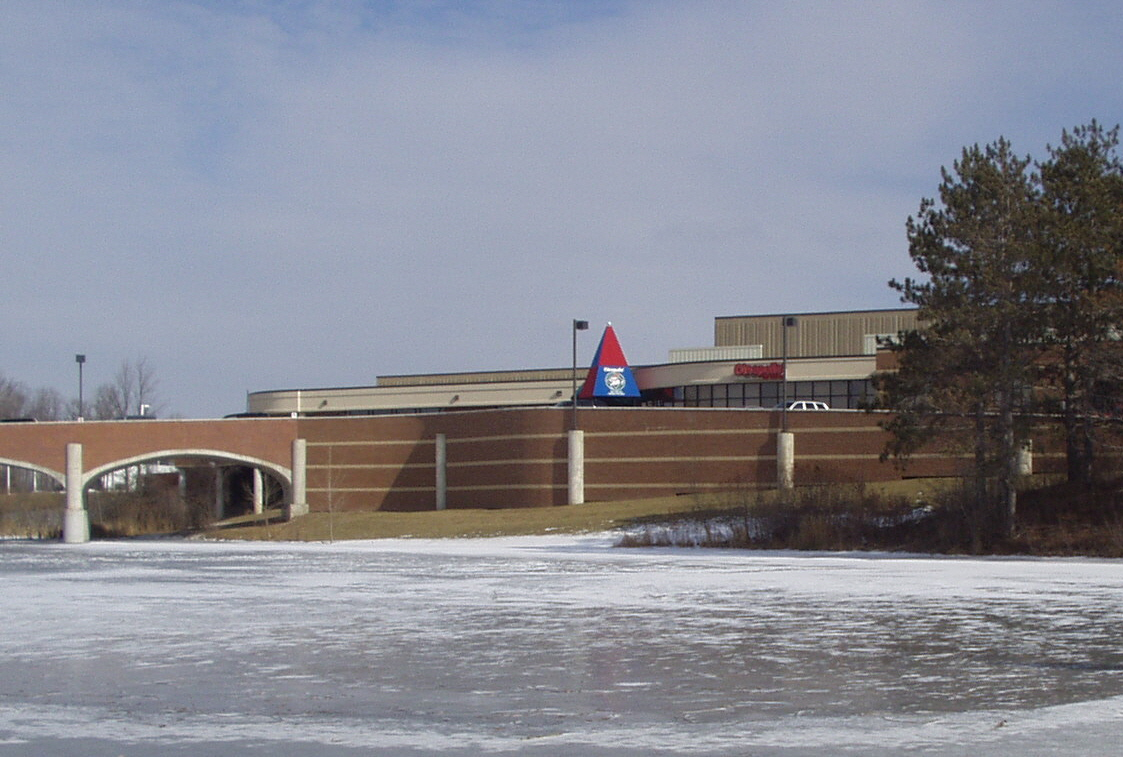
- Interactive map of USA Hockey Arena
- Former names: Compuware Sports Arena (1996–2007); Compuware Arena (2007–2015)
- Location: 14900 Beck Rd. Plymouth Township, Michigan
- Owner: USA Hockey
- Operator: Arena Management Inc.
- Capacity: 3,504 (seated); 4,500 (incl. standing)
- Field size: Ice, 200' x 85'

Construction
- Groundbreaking: May 1996
- Opened: September 10, 1996
- Cost: $22 million
- Architects: DTS + Winkelmann, LLC
- Structural engineer: Structural Associates Inc.

Tenants
- Detroit/Plymouth Whalers (OHL) (1996–2015); Detroit Compuware Ambassadors (NAHL) (1996–2003); Detroit Rockers (NPSL) (2000–2001); Wayne State Warriors (NCAA) (2003–2005); Detroit Ignition (MISL/XSL) (2006–2009); Detroit Waza (PASL-Pro) (2008–2009); USA Hockey National Team Development Program (USHL) (2015–present)

The USA Hockey Arena is a multi-purpose arena in Plymouth Township, Michigan, opened in 1996. Originally known as the Compuware Sports Arena, its name was shortened to Compuware Arena on September 11, 2007, to better market the venue for non-sporting events it hosted. It was renamed again to USA Hockey Arena in 2015 when the USA Hockey Foundation purchased the arena.

== History ==
Peter Karmanos, president of Compuware and owner of the Detroit Whalers, arranged to build the Whalers a new home as soon as the 1995–96 season ended after playing that season at Oak Park Ice Arena and The Palace of Auburn Hills. The Compuware Sports Arena was constructed in six months' time, ready for the 1996–97 season. The team remained the Detroit Whalers after moving to Plymouth Township and then were renamed the Plymouth Whalers in 1997–98.

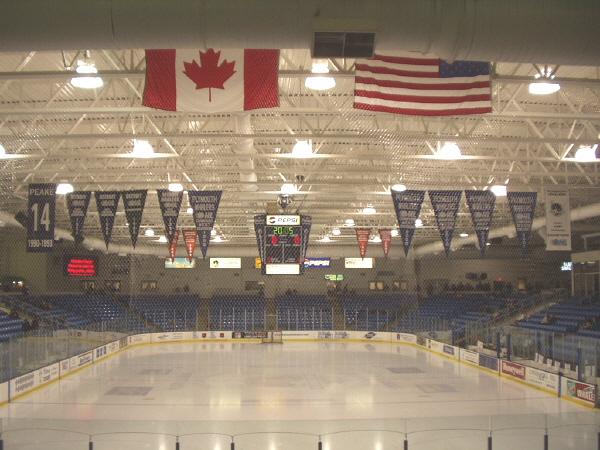
Interior of USA Hockey Arena

The complex features two arenas. The main arena, where the Whalers played their home games, has a standard NHL-size rink and has seating for roughly 4,000 people. The second features an Olympic-size ice surface, and 800 seats on only one side of the ice. The two arenas share concession stands, both of which have openings for both arenas simultaneously, allowing one set of staff to serve both arenas simultaneously. The arena was home to the now defunct Detroit Ignition, a Major Indoor Soccer League / XSL team, as well as the Compuware Ambassadors minor hockey program. Previously, the arena hosted the now defunct Detroit Rockers of the National Professional Soccer League during its last season in 2000-2001. On March 17, 2006, Total Nonstop Action Wrestling held its first Detroit-area house show at the arena which was promoted and booked by the Detroit-based hip hop duo, the Insane Clown Posse. On October 22, 2006, TNA would return to host its Bound for Glory 2006 pay-per-view at the arena. The show was the first monthly pay-per-view event that TNA had held outside of Universal Studios in Orlando, Florida.

The arena also hosts the annual MHSAA high school state championships for boys ice hockey, and hosts the commencement ceremonies for Adlai E. Stevenson High School, Northville High School, as well as for other high schools.

In November 2014, USA Hockey reached an agreement to eventually take over Compuware Arena by mid-2015, with an intent to relocate the National Team Development Program from Ann Arbor to Plymouth, and use the facility to "host and showcase other USA Hockey programs and international events". The Plymouth Whalers were to remain a tenant, but were ultimately sold in January 2015 and re-located to Flint.

In April 2017, USA Hockey Arena hosted the 2017 IIHF Women's World Championship.
