= Greg Howes =

American soccer player

Personal information
- Full name: Gregory Howes
- Date of birth: March 26, 1977 (age 49)
- Place of birth: Tacoma, Washington, United States
- Height: 6 ft 0 in (1.83 m)
- Position: Defensive midfielder

College career
Years	Team	Apps	(Gls)
1996	Stetson Hatters		
1998–1999	Oregon State Beavers		

Senior career*
Years	Team	Apps	(Gls)
1999	Willamette Valley Firebirds		
2000	Seattle Sounders	27	(17)
2000–2008	Milwaukee Wave (indoor)	275	(311)
2001–2002	Portland Timbers	40	(12)
2003–2004	Milwaukee Wave United	52	(20)
2005–2006	Rochester Raging Rhinos	43	(9)
2007	Seattle Sounders	21	(5)
2008–2009	Stockton Cougars (indoor)	3	(6)
2009	Tacoma Tide	12	(6)
2010–2011	Tacoma Stars (indoor)	15	(28)
2011–2012	Milwaukee Wave (indoor)	25	(24)

International career
2001–2005	United States (Futsal)		

Managerial career
- 2008–2009: Tacoma Stars (indoor)
- 2009: Tacoma Tide
- 2012–2013: Las Vegas Legends (indoor)
- * Club domestic league appearances and goals as of January 28th, 2012

Greg Howes (born March 26, 1977, in Tacoma, Washington) is an American soccer player, most recently coach for Las Vegas Legends in the Professional Arena Soccer League.

== Career ==
In 1995, Howes graduated from Franklin Pierce High School. He played his freshman season of collegiate soccer at Stetson University. He then transferred to Oregon State University, playing soccer there in 1998 and 1999. In 1999, he played for the Willamette Valley Firebirds of the Premier Development League. On February 7, 2000, the Seattle Sounders selected Howes in the first round (eighth overall) of the USL A-League draft. He tied for third on the points list that season and was named the 2000 A-League Rookie of the Year. On October 10, 2000, Howes signed with the Milwaukee Wave in the National Professional Soccer League. He was selected to the 2000-2001 All Rookie team. He would play each winter indoor season with the Wave until 2008. After 2001, the team was renamed the Major Indoor Soccer League. On February 8, 2001, the Sounders traded Howes to the Portland Timbers in exchange for a second and third round draft pick and cash. He spent two seasons with the Timbers before being released at the end of the 2002 season. In April 2003, Howes joined the Milwaukee Wave United an outdoor expansion team built around the Milwaukee Wave roster. He played for the Rochester Raging Rhinos in 2005 and 2006 before returning to the Seattle Sounders in 2007. Howes was part of the Seattle squad which won the 2007 USL-1 championship. In 2008 Howes signed with the Stockton Cougars of the Professional Arena Soccer League. in the Professional Arena Soccer League. Howes was the MVP of the MISL three consecutive seasons (2005 and 2006), and has played for the United States national futsal team.

In 2008, Howes was player/head coach of the Tacoma Stars, a Professional Arena Soccer League team. On March 28, 2009, Howes was announced at the player/head coach of Tacoma Tide in the USL Premier Development League. He was replaced by Gerry Gray in April 2010.

In 2011, Howes was inducted into the Milwaukee Wave Hall of Fame. That same year, he came back to the Milwaukee Wave. He scored a goal in the championship game, which the Wave won.

In 2012, he became the first head coach of the Las Vegas Legends in the Professional Arena Soccer League. He led the team to a division win and the playoffs in 2012–13 Las Vegas Legends season.

In 2014, he became the head coach of Washington Premier Soccer Clubs BU97

== Honors ==
=== Seattle Sounders ===
- USL First Division Championship (1): 2007
- USL First Division Commissioner's Cup (1): 2007

=== Milwaukee Wave ===
- NPSL Championship (1): 2000-01
- MISL Championship (1): 2004-05
