= Danny Waltman =

American soccer player (born 1981)

Personal information
- Full name: Danny Waltman
- Date of birth: September 19, 1981 (age 45)
- Place of birth: Gig Harbor, Washington, United States
- Height: 5 ft 10 in (1.78 m)
- Position: Goalkeeper

Team information
- Current team: Tacoma Stars
- Number: 24

College career
Years	Team	Apps	(Gls)
1999–2002	Washington Huskies		

Senior career*
Years	Team	Apps	(Gls)
2003	Yakima Reds	11	(0)
2004	Seattle Sounders	0	(0)
2004–2006	Chicago Storm (indoor)	61	(2)
2006–2009	Detroit Ignition (indoor)	58	(0)
2009	Pittsburgh Riverhounds	16	(0)
2009–2010	Rockford Rampage (indoor)	8	(0)
2010–2015	Missouri Comets (indoor)	99	(1)
2015–	Tacoma Stars (indoor)	125	(3)

International career
2015–	United States arena		
- * Club domestic league appearances and goals as of 15 December 2022

Danny Waltman (born September 19, 1981, in Gig Harbor, Washington) is an American soccer player best known for his career as a goalkeeper in professional indoor soccer. He currently plays for the Tacoma Stars in the Major Arena Soccer League.

== Career ==
=== Youth and college ===
Waltman began his soccer career with Solaris '81, Washington state champions each of his seven seasons. He attended Bellarmine Preparatory School in Tacoma, Washington. While there, he was a four-year starter on the boys' soccer team. In those four seasons, the school was undefeated in league play. Waltman earned All-League honors four years running and was All-Area for two years. He holds the Bellarmine records for games started, wins and goals against average.

He then attended the University of Washington, playing on the school's soccer team from 1999 to 2002. He started 18 of 19 games in his senior year, had 12 wins, 7 shutouts. He was All-Pac-10 second team, Pac-10 second team all academic, was co-captain and was voted Most Inspirational by his teammates. He graduated bachelor's degree in business.

During his college years Waltman also played for the Yakima Reds in the USL Premier Development League.

=== Professional ===
In April 2004, Waltman signed with the Seattle Sounders of USL First Division where he spent the season as a backup goalkeeper. On October 18, 2004, the Chicago Storm of Major Indoor Soccer League (MISL) announced they had signed Waltman on loan from the Sounders. He was first team All-Rookie, with multiple keeper-of-the-week awards.

In September 2006, he signed a three-year contract extension with the Storm, was traded two days later to the Detroit Ignition in exchange for Jim Larkin.

In 2006-2007 Waltman was the back-up for Sanaldo, but achieved a 5–1 record. As the starter in the 2007–2008 season Waltman led the MISL in minutes played, wins, assists by a goalkeeper, and save percentage, helping the Ignition to their second straight regular season championship. He was named second team MISL all-league. Danny achieved his 1000th MISL career save in 2008.

In 2008-2009 Waltman led the Detroit Ignition to the Championship of the new Xtreme Soccer League. He led in almost all statistical categories, started all 20 games, was Keeper-of-the Month twice, was named to the XSL All-Star team, and was voted MVP of the XSL, the first keeper to win that award in indoor soccer since the legendary Victor Nogueira in 1998.

Danny prides himself as being a team player. Commenting on the XSL championship, he quoted Michael Jordan: "Talent wins games. Intelligence and teamwork win championships." And on winning the MVP award, Waltman said " It's a team award. I benefit from the great play of my teammates."

Waltman signed with the Pittsburgh Riverhounds for the 2009 season. For the Riverhounds Waltman collected 5 wins, 4 shutouts, and had a GAA of 1.27, He was 3rd in the league with 61 saves and received one Team-of-the-Week recognition. Of the season Danny said "It was great to play outdoor again. I did well, but I can do a lot better. The Riverhound organization was outstanding, and the fans were great."

Waltman was the first player signed by the MISL 1st year Missouri Comets. He was named February Goalkeeper of the Month going 3–1 in February and played an important role in the Comets' playoff drive. Waltman turned in his best month of the season in February, punctuated by his play during the Comets' three-game win streak in which Waltman did not surrender more than seven points in any game. Waltman made multiple key saves in all three games, stopping point-blank shots with his hands and his legs. After saving 10 of 17 shots in Chicago on the 6th, Waltman went on to save 21 of 24 at home against the Chicago Riot, 17 of 20 against the Omaha Vipers, and 18 of 21 in Chicago, saving a total of 66 shots on 82 attempts for the month (an 80% clip). To top off Waltman's efforts in February, he scored a three-point goal in the Comets' last game of the month, in Chicago on the 26th.

In June 2015, Waltman signed with the Tacoma Stars of the Major Arena Soccer League. Waltman led the Stars to three playoff berths in four seasons between 2016 and 2019.
