= Don D'Ambra =

American soccer player & coach (born 1972)

Personal information
- Date of birth: May 5, 1972 (age 54)
- Place of birth: Philadelphia, Pennsylvania, U.S.
- Height: 5 ft 10 in (1.78 m)
- Position: Forward

College career
Years	Team	Apps	(Gls)
1990–1994	Saint Joseph's Hawks		

Senior career*
Years	Team	Apps	(Gls)
1994–1995	Milwaukee Wave (indoor)	79	(71)
1995	Chicago Stingers		
1996–2007	Philadelphia KiXX (indoor)	436	(385)
1997–1998	Hershey Wildcats	51	(19)
2009–2010	Philadelphia KiXX (indoor)	9	(8)

International career
2003–2007	United States Futsal		

Managerial career
- 2002–2010: Philadelphia KiXX (indoor)
- 2010–2024: Saint Joseph's University
- * Club domestic league appearances and goals

Don D'Ambra (born May 5, 1972) is an American retired soccer forward who formerly coached the Saint Joseph's University men's soccer team.

== Player ==
=== Youth ===
D'Ambra graduated from Northeast Catholic High School where he is a charter member of the North Catholic Soccer Hall of Fame. He then attended Saint Joseph's University, playing soccer there from 1990 to 1994. He scored 41 goals and 102 points during his career, setting school records in both categories. He additionally holds school records for goals in a season with 15, and points in a season with 38. He is the only player from Saint Joseph's ever to be named Atlantic 10 player of the year.

=== Professional ===
He began his professional career with the Milwaukee Wave of the National Professional Soccer League in 1994. He was a 1994–1995 All Rookie forward. In 1995, D'Ambra spent the outdoor season with the Chicago Stingers of the USISL. In 1995, he left the Wave for the Philadelphia KiXX' inaugural season. From 1996 to 2002, he was solely a player for the Kixx, but from 2002 to 2010, he assumed a head coaching role as well. He currently holds all-time club records for games played (436), points (1020), goals (380), and game winning goals (42). He has reached the 100 point plateau three different seasons, including a career high in 1997–1998. In 1997 and 1998, D'Ambra played for the Hershey Wildcats in the USISL A-League. He also returned during the 2009–2010 indoor season to play nine games for the KiXX.

=== Futsal ===
In 2003, D'Ambra joined the United States men's national futsal team and continued to play for it through the 2008 Pan American Games.

== Coach ==
On October 24, 2002, he was appointed interim head coach of the Philadelphia KiXX from the Major Indoor Soccer League. On December 3, he was officially named the club's third head coach, succeeding Omid Namazi. From 2002 to 2010, he served as a player-coach for the squad, amassing a club record 111 wins. He led the 2007 squad to an MISL championship. On April 15, 2010, he was named head men's soccer coach at Saint Joseph's University.
