= Philadelphia KiXX =

- Founded: 1995
- League: NPSL (1995–2001); Major Indoor Soccer League (2001–10)

The Philadelphia KiXX were a professional indoor soccer team based in Philadelphia, USA. The team competed as an NPSL expansion franchise and then played in the Major Indoor Soccer League.

== History ==
The team's original owner was Ed Tepper, also president of Tepper Properties Inc, had been one of the co-founders of the original MISL. In 2001, the KiXX along with five other NPSL franchises founded the new Major Indoor Soccer League. They were originally sponsored by Oki Data Americas. The KiXX won the first MISL championship (2001–02 season) over the Milwaukee Wave 2 games to 1 (4–11, 11–4, 8–6) in the best of three game championship series. The KiXX also won the 2006–07 MISL championship defeating the Detroit Ignition 13–8 in a one-game championship. After the MISL folded in 2008, the KiXX announced that they had joined the National Indoor Soccer League for its inaugural season in 2008–09. The NISL took on the MISL moniker for its second season.

On March 2, 2010, KiXX goalkeeper Peter Pappas retired after playing his final match against the Baltimore Blast at the Liacouras Center. In honor of his years of dedication and spotless record the KiXX decided to retire the #22 jersey. Pappas spent 13 seasons with the KiXX. During that time he played in 416 matches, recording 5,399 saves and 230 wins. He was named Major Indoor Soccer League (MISL) ‘Goalkeeper of the Year’ four times and an All-League selection eight times. Fellow long-term KiXX member Don D'Ambra also retired in 2010. He served as head coach of the KiXX from 2002 to 2010 and played 575 games, scoring 483 goals. In April 2010, D'Ambra was named the head coach of the Saint Joseph's Hawks men's soccer team.

The team went on hiatus after the conclusion of the 2009–10 season and did not return to play before the MISL folded as a league in 2014.

== Year-by-year ==
Year	League	Reg. season	Playoffs	Avg. attendance
1996–97	NPSL II	3rd East, 17–23	Lost Conference Quarterfinals to Blast 8–15; 8–18	7,894
1997–98	NPSL II	1st East, 26–14	Won Conference Semifinals over Crunch 10–4; 29–27; Lost Conference Finals to Wave 9–7; 5–19; 3–12; 10–16	8,637
1998–99	NPSL II	1st East, 23–17	Won Conference Semifinals over Wave 9–11; 13–11; 14–5; Lost Conference Finals to Crunch 0–15; 15–30	8,974
1999-00	NPSL II	2nd East, 24–20	Lost Conference Semifinals to Blast 11–15; 12–25	8,081
2000–01	NPSL II	4th American, 22–18	Won Conference Semifinals over Heat 21–19; 19–14; Won Conference Finals over Blast 19–23; 12–8; 16–15; Lost Championship to Wave 12–16; 8–9; 8–10	5,224
2001–02	MISL II	2nd MISL, 30–14	Won Semifinals over Comets 18–13; Won Championship over Wave 4–11; 11–4; 8–6	5,328
2002–03	MISL II	1st Eastern, 24–12	Lost Semifinals to Blast 6–8	4,294
2003–04	MISL II	2nd Eastern, 20–16	Lost Quarterfinals to Comets 5–8	5,226
2004–05	MISL II	3rd MISL, 22–17	Lost Semifinals to Force 3–6; 6–10	5,361
2005–06	MISL II	5th MISL, 10–20	did not qualify	6,990
2006–07	MISL II	3rd MISL, 17–13	Won Semifinals over Storm 8–11; 10–6; 2–0; Won Championship over Ignition 13–8	6,551
2007–08	MISL II	7th MISL, 12–18	did not qualify	6,118
2008–09	NISL	4th NISL, 10–8	did not qualify	6,444
2009–10	MISL III	4th MISL, 8–12	did not qualify	4,725
Total		265–222; Win % = .544	15–20; Win % = .429	6,080

== Head coaches ==
Name	Years
(United States) Dave MacWilliams	1996–1999
(United States) Omid Namazi	1999–2002
(United States) Don D'Ambra	2002–2010

== Arenas ==
- Wachovia Spectrum 1996–2009
- Liacouras Center 2009–2010
1. Between 1996 and 2009 the team has also played select games at the Wachovia Center, Gaylord Entertainment Center in Nashville, Tennessee, and at the Sovereign Bank Arena in Trenton, New Jersey.
