= New Jersey Ironmen =

- Full name: New Jersey Ironmen Soccer Team
- Nickname: Ironmen
- Founded: 2006
- Dissolved: 2010
- Ground: Prudential Center; Newark, New Jersey

The New Jersey Ironmen were an American indoor soccer team. They originally joined the Major Indoor Soccer League (MISL) for the 2007–08 season. When the MISL ceased operations a year later, they joined the Xtreme Soccer League. The team played at the Prudential Center, sharing the facility with the NHL's New Jersey Devils and the Seton Hall University men's basketball team. Omid Namazi, recognized twice as MISL Coach of the Year, was the coach of the team.

The Ironmen won their first game against the Orlando Sharks, 7–4, on October 27, 2007. The team won its first home, 8–6, game on December 1, 2007 against the Detroit Ignition. Former New York Cosmo Pelé acted as honorary captain for the opener. Tab Ramos, who played on the MetroStars from 1996 to 2002, was honorary captain for the second home game. Giovanni Savarese, who is the all-time leading goal scorer for the Metros, was the honorary captain for the fourth home game. The Empire Supporters Club, the main supporters club for the New York Red Bulls, was present at every Ironmen home game.

New York area Voice Actor/Narrator/Host/Actor Ed Kalegi was the in-house voice of the team and handles the Public Address Announcing at all Home games.

New York area Voice Actor/Corporate Trainer/Public Speaker Ric Sperrazza was the voice of the team's radio commercials for the 2007–2008 season.

In the 2008–09 season, The Ironmen played in the Xtreme Soccer League (XSL) and finished in second place.

On July 3, 2009, the XSL announced that it was suspending operations for one year. However, that did not come to fruition as the league folded.

== Year-by-year ==
Year	League	Reg. season	Playoffs	Attendance
2007–08	MISL II	6th MISL, 14–16	Lost Quarterfinals to Blast 10–22; 4–6	4,965
2008–09	XSL	2nd XSL, 11–9	No playoffs	3,051
Totals	MISL II	Reg. Season Record 25–25; Reg. Season Win % = .500	Playoff Record 0–2; Playoff Win % = .000	4,199

== Head coaches ==
- (United States) Omid Namazi (2007–2009)

== Arenas ==
- Prudential Center (2007–2009)
