= Milwaukee Wave United =

The Milwaukee Wave United was an American professional soccer team, which last played in the A-League, the American second division.

The Wave United was formed and joined the A-League after the Milwaukee Rampage folded in 2002. The team announced that it would withdraw from the A-League on November 9, 2004, and play an exhibition schedule starting in 2005.

The Wave United were affiliated with the Milwaukee Wave, an indoor team.

== Notable players ==
- Sam Sloma (born 1982) – English football player

== Year-by-year ==
Year	Division		Reg. season	Playoffs	Open Cup	Avg. attendance
2003	2	USL A-League	1st, Central	Division Finals	4th Round	2,085
2004	2	USL A-League	5th, Western	Did not qualify	Did not qualify	1,690
