= Detroit Ignition =

American indoor soccer team

Detroit Ignition
Founded	2006
Disbanded	2009
Arena	Compuware Arena
Based in	Plymouth Township, Michigan
Colors	red, gold, black
League	Xtreme Soccer League

The Detroit Ignition were an American indoor soccer team that has played three seasons, most recently 2008–09.

In April 2006, Greg Bibb, president of Hantz Group Sports and Entertainment, introduced the teams as a new Major Indoor Soccer League expansion team. They played at the Compuware Sports Arena in Plymouth Township, Michigan. Their first season was 2006–07 MISL season.

After the 2007–08 MISL season, the league folded. Soon afterwards, the Ignition joined the Xtreme Soccer League. The Ignition ended the 2008–09 campaign in first place which netted them the XSL title. The XSL went on "hiatus" after one season.

== Year-by-year ==
Year	League	Reg. season	Playoffs	Attendance average
2006–07	MISL II	1st MISL, 18-12	Lost Final	3,545
2007–08	MISL II	1st MISL, 22–8	Lost Semifinal	3,745
2008–09	XSL	1st XSL, 12-8	Won XSL Championship	3,473

== Roster ==
As of 16th of January, 2009 Note: Flags indicate national team as defined under FIFA eligibility rules; some limited exceptions apply. Players may hold more than one non-FIFA nationality.

No.	Pos.	Nation	Player
2	MF	USA	Tino Scicluna
3	DF	CAN	Vahid Assadpour
4	DF	USA	Josh Rife
6	DF	USA	Wes Sechrist
7	FW	USA	Mike Apple
8	DF	USA	Dan Trosper
9	FW	LBR	Worteh Sampson
10	MF	SRB	Miodrag Djerisilo
11	MF	USA	Ryan Mack
12	FW	USA	Droo Callahan

No.	Pos.	Nation	Player
13	MF	USA	Drew Ducker
14	DF	USA	Zach Wilkes
15	DF	CAN	Abraham Francois
16	FW	LBR	Leo Gibson
17	MF	USA	Nik Djokic
18	DF	USA	James "Iggy" Igneczi
21	MF	CAN	Kyt Selaidopoulos
22	DF	USA	Darrel Quinn
24	GK	USA	Danny Waltman
26	DF	USA	Nate Craft
33	FW	USA	Drew Crawford

== Head coaches ==
- (United States) Mark Pulisic (2006–2007)
- (United States) Bob Lilley (2007–2008)
- (United States) Matt Johnson (2008–2009)

== Arenas ==
- Compuware Arena (2006–09)

== Television ==
For the 2007–2008 season, 11 Detroit Ignition games were televised by Comcast Local, a Midwest sports network based in Michigan and Indiana. Also four games were shown on Fox Soccer Channel. For the 2008–2009 season, 10 Detroit Ignition games were televised by Comcast Local. All games were live on b2 Network.
