= Chicago Storm (soccer) =

American indoor soccer team

- Founded: 2004
- Dissolved: 2011
- Ground: UIC Pavilion (2004–2006); Sears Centre (2007–2011)
- League: Major Indoor Soccer League (2004-08); Xtreme Soccer League (2009)

The Chicago Storm was an indoor soccer team in the Major Indoor Soccer League from 2004 to 2008 and the Xtreme Soccer League in 2009. The team folded after playing in a local indoor league, the Ultimate Soccer League.

== History ==
The Storm played home games during its first two seasons at the UIC Pavilion on the West Side of Chicago. Former Chicago Sting and Chicago Fire soccer great Frank Klopas coached the team during its first two seasons, and Ted Chronopoulos captained the team for their inaugural 2004 season. Chicago Sting leading scorer Karl-Heinz Granitza worked for the club's front office in 2005. In 2005–06, the Storm started the season with a 2–6 record but improved over the second half of the season to make the play-offs.

With attendance an issue, the team moved its home games to the newly built Sears Centre in Hoffman Estates, a northwest suburb of Chicago, for the 2006–07 season. Steve Morris, a former Illinois soccer player of the year, replaced Klopas as coach for the 2006–07 season.

The Storm had a developmental team in 2008 called the Tormenta. They made the playoffs that year despite a late season slide, but lost to Monterrey in the quarterfinals after losing on a golden goal.

After the MISL folded, the Storm played in the Xtreme Soccer League. After the XSL folded with just one year of play, the Storm joined the Ultimate Soccer League.

== Year-by-year ==
Year	League	Reg. season	Playoffs	Attendance average
2004–05	MISL II	6th MISL, 18-21	Failed to qualify	3,408
2005–06	MISL II	4th MISL, 13-17	Lost Semifinal	1,530
2006–07	MISL II	2nd MISL, 17-13	Lost Semifinal	2,473
2007–08	MISL II	5th MISL, 15-15	Lost Quarterfinal	3,609
2008–09	XSL	4th XSL, 7-13	No Playoffs	2,611
2009–10	USL	1st USL, 11-1	Unknown	Not Recorded

== Final squad ==
As of April 5, 2009 Note: Flags indicate national team as defined under FIFA eligibility rules; some limited exceptions apply. Players may hold more than one non-FIFA nationality.

No.	Pos.	Nation	Player
—	DF	MEX	Arturo Alanis
—	GK	MEX	Victor Balderrama
—	DF	SRB	Alex Bogosavljevic
—	DF	ARG	Pablo Castro
—	DF	MEX	Victor Garcia
—	MF	USA	Missoum Harbouche
—	MF	USA	Jonathan Hernandez
—	DF	MEX	Juan Hernandez
—	MF	MEX	Felip Hernandez
—	GK	SRB	Ivan Jevtić
—	FW	SRB	Vladimir Knežević

No.	Pos.	Nation	Player
—	DF	POL	Piotr Kolasinski
—	FW	PLE	Awadalla Morad
—	MF	COL	Jorge Prado
—	DF	SRB	Dušan Radovanović
—	MF	BRA	Roberto Linck
—	MF	ARG	Jorge Luis Raffa
—	DF	SRB	Branko Savić
—	MF	USA	Todd Short
—	FW	USA	Geovanni Tello
—	FW	SRB	Zlatko Zebić
—	DF	BRA	Guilherme Veiga

== Head coaches ==
- (United States) Frank Klopas 2004–2006
- (Scotland) Steve Morris 2006–2009
- (Serbia) Branko Savic 2009–2011

== Retired numbers ==
- No. 12 (Germany) Karl-Heinz Granitza

== Arenas ==
- UIC Pavilion 2004–2006
- Sears Centre 2006–2009
- Chicago Sports Zone 2009–2010
