= Xtreme Soccer League =

Indoor soccer league

- First season: 2008
- Folded: 2009
- Country: United States
- Number of clubs: 4
- Last champions: Detroit Ignition

The Xtreme Soccer League (XSL) was an indoor soccer league that began play in December 2008. Four teams from the former Major Indoor Soccer League participated in the first XSL season: the Chicago Storm, Detroit Ignition, Milwaukee Wave, and New Jersey Ironmen. Other former MISL teams joined the National Indoor Soccer League or Professional Arena Soccer League.

The XSL officially launched on September 16, 2008, with a press conference in Milwaukee, Wisconsin. Brian Loftin was the XSL's commissioner. Each team played a 20-game schedule beginning in December and ending in late March. There were no playoffs.

On December 3, 2008, the XSL announced that Brine would supply the Triumph X 600 as the official match ball.

Citing economic trouble, the XSL folded in July 2009. Although the league officially called it a one-year hiatus, the league never resumed play.

== Teams ==
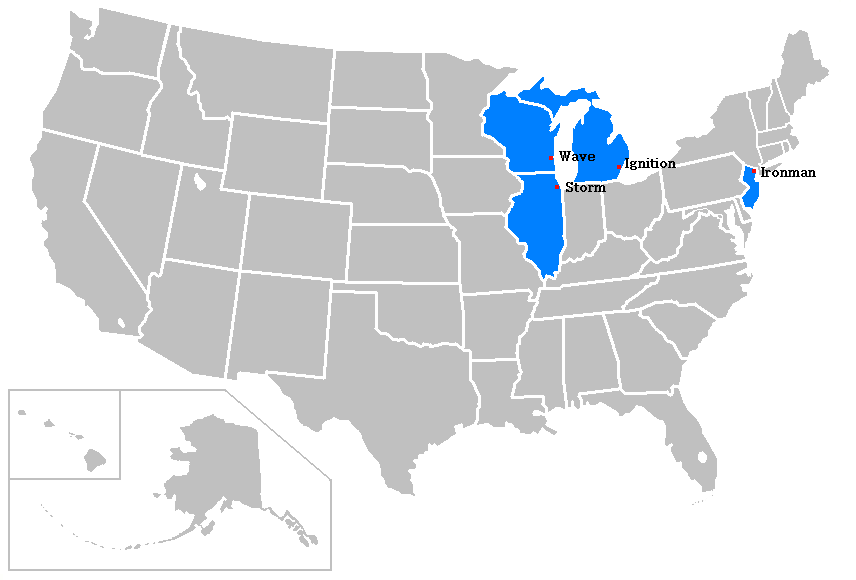

Team	Stadium	City	Founded	Joined XSL	After XSL folded
Chicago Storm	Sears Centre	Hoffman Estates, Illinois (Chicago area)	2004	2008	Joined USL
Detroit Ignition	Compuware Arena	Plymouth, Michigan (Detroit area)	2006	2008	Folded
Milwaukee Wave	U.S. Cellular Arena	Milwaukee, Wisconsin	1984	2008	Joined NISL
New Jersey Ironmen	Prudential Center	Newark, New Jersey	2007	2008	Folded

== XSL champions ==
Season	Champion	Runner-up	Date Won	Notes
2008–09	Detroit Ignition	New Jersey Ironmen	March 27, 2009	Season Championship

== Average attendance ==
Year	Games	Total	Average
2008–09	80	137,382	3,435
Seasons	Games	Total	Average
1	80	137,382	3,435

== Xtreme Soccer Xperience ==
The Xtreme Soccer Xperience (XSL's parent company) held "3 vs. 3" tournaments, beach soccer tournaments, street soccer tournaments, and freestyle juggling competitions. The league also offered a fantasy season to fans, similar to fantasy football.
