= Milwaukee Wave =

Soccer club

- Founded: 1984; 42 years ago
- Stadium: UW–Milwaukee Panther Arena
- Capacity: 9,500
- Owner: Mike Zimmerman
- Head Coach: Marcio Leite
- League: Major Arena Soccer League
- 2024–25: 5th, League; Playoffs: Semifinals
- Website: milwaukeewave.com
Home colors	Away colors

The Milwaukee Wave are an American professional indoor soccer team based in Milwaukee, Wisconsin, that competes in the Major Arena Soccer League (MASL). Founded in 1984, they have been the oldest continuously operating professional indoor soccer team in the United States and are seven-time league champions, most recent being the 2018–19 champions of the MASL.

The team plays their games at the UW–Milwaukee Panther Arena. The team colors are black and yellow. The team has won seven league championships in their history, three in the NPSL, three in the MISL, and one in the MASL.

== History ==
The team was founded on August 3, 1984, as a member of the American Indoor Soccer Association and played in every season and incarnation of that league (see NPSL). They have also played in the Xtreme Soccer League and the second and third versions of the Major Indoor Soccer League. The team is currently a member of the Major Arena Soccer League. Milwaukee also hosted the 2003 and 2006 MISL II All-Star Games.

Keith Tozer was the team's coach for 21 years before leaving to become United States national futsal team head coach. While with the Wave, he was the all-time winningest coach in North American indoor soccer, with six league championships and more than 700 wins.

The Wave played in the first season of the Xtreme Soccer League in the 2008 – 2009 season, but moved to the new Major Indoor Soccer League for the 2009–2010 season.

After the 2013–2014 season, the team announced that it was leaving the MISL along with five other teams and joining the MASL.

In 2014 the ownership group ROC Ventures, headed by Mike Zimmerman, became a partner in the team's ownership.

Just before the 2014–15 season began, the Wave replaced their traditional green artificial turf with a black turf to match the team's colors and marketing strategy. Reception by fans and the press was mixed but generally positive.

== Players ==
As of 2 January 2026

=== Active roster ===
Note: Flags indicate national team as defined under FIFA eligibility rules; some limited exceptions apply. Players may hold more than one non-FIFA nationality.

No.	Pos.	Nation	Player
00	MF	USA	Cam Will
1	GK	BRA	Gabriel Greenfield
6	MF	USA	Shawn Azcueta
9	DF	USA	Derek Huffman
10	MD	USA	Mario Alvarez
12	DF	USA	Stuart Grable
14	DF	USA	Mike Howell
15	MF	USA	Cesar Correa
16	FW	VEN	Oscar Flores
20	DF	USA	Tony Walls
23	MF	GER	Max Ludwig
24	MF	HAI	Max Ferdinand
25	DF	USA	Grant Michaels

No.	Pos.	Nation	Player
26	FW	CAN	Ian Bennett
30	GK	USA	Gerardo Perez
32	GK	USA	Augie Rey
33	GK	USA	William Banahene
40	DF	JAM	Troy Morrison
44	GK	USA	Alex Steinwascher
55	DF	USA	Tyler Howard
76	MF	USA	Tanner Hodgson
78	FW	USA	Nestor Dominguez
79	MF	USA	Jair Real
80	FW	USA	Alex Sanchez
88	FW	USA	Kyle Crain
97	FW	USA	Javier Steinwascher
99	FW	BRA	Andre Hayne

=== Inactive roster ===
Note: Flags indicate national team as defined under FIFA eligibility rules; some limited exceptions apply. Players may hold more than one non-FIFA nationality.

No.	Pos.	Nation	Player
4	FW	USA	Tyler Bagley
7	FW	BRA	Ricardo Carvalho
8	FW	BRA	Breno Oliveria
31	GK	USA	Travis Schmid
75	MF	USA	Carson Hodgson

=== Wave Hall of Fame inductees ===
Name	Inducted	Years played
Peter Knezic	2009	1984–1990
Art Kramer	2009	1987–1991
Steve Morris	2009	1992–2002
Victor Nogueira	2009	1992–2003
Todd Dusosky	2009	1996–2007
Michael King	2009	1993–2008
Tony Pierce	2010	1985–1991, 1992–1993
Pat White	2011	1995–2005
Lee Rogers	2011	1986–1992
Greg Howes	2011	2000–2008, 2011–2012
George Pastor	2012	1986–1991
Michael Richardson	2012	1994–1995, 1996–2000
Jimmy Banks	2013	1987–1993
Ricky Mobley	2013	1993–2000

=== Retired numbers ===
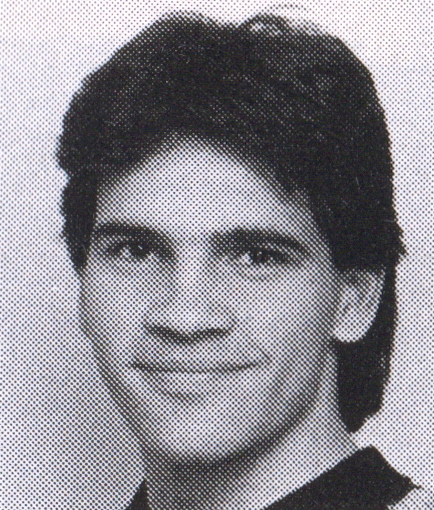
Goalkeeper Victor Nogueira is one the Milwaukee Wave players whose number was retired

No.	Player	Pos.	Tenure	No. ret.	Ref.
5	(United States) Peter Knezic	MF	1985–90	1992	
11	(United States) Steve Morris	FW	1992–01	2002	
13	(England) Michael King (Note: At the moment of his retirement, King was the all-time top scorer for Milwauke.)	FW	1987–09	2009	
17	(United States) Todd Dusosky	FW	1996–07	2014	
19	(United States) Troy Dusosky	DF	2001–11	2014	
21	(United States) Giuliano Oliviero	DF	1995–97, 2005–14	2025	
27	(South Africa) Victor Nogueira	GK	1992–03	2004	

=== Other notable former players ===
- (United States) Brian Loftin
- (United States) Jimmy Banks

== Year-by-year ==
League champions	Runners-Up	Division champions	Playoff berth

Year	League	Record	PF	PA	Finish	Playoffs	Avg. Attend.
1984–85	AISA	13–27	213	248	6th, AISA	did not qualify	2,114
1985–86	AISA	11–29	189	247	6th, AISA	did not qualify	1,802
1986–87	AISA	12–30	148	222	4th, Northern	did not qualify	2,316
1987–88	AISA	11–13	103	111	3rd, AISA	3rd, Challenge Cup, 6–6	3,271
1988–89	AISA	24–16	377	355	2nd, AISA	Lost Semifinal	6,410
1989–90	AISA	21–19	373	353	2nd, National	Lost Semifinals	7,369
1990–91	NPSL II	23–17	453	404	2nd, National	Lost First Round	6,765
1991–92	NPSL II	18–22	453	534	4th, National	did not qualify	7,629
1992–93	NPSL II	17–23	513	509	5th, National	did not qualify	7,758
1993–94	NPSL II	20–20	496	486	4th, National	Lost First Round	7,692
1994–95	NPSL II	23–17	535	459	3rd, National	Lost First Round	7,108
1995–96	NPSL II	30–10	610	438	2nd, National	Lost Division Semifinals	7,363
1996–97	NPSL II	26–14	525	472	2nd, Midwest	Lost Conference Quarterfinals	7,975
1997–98	NPSL II	28–12	593	486	1st, Central	Won Championship	7,903
1998–99	NPSL II	25–15	518	428	2nd, Central	Lost Conference Semifinals	8,453
1999–2000	NPSL II	31–13	657	483	1st, North	Won Championship	8,002
2000–01	NPSL II	24–16	544	452	1st, National	Won Championship	8,310
2001–02	MISL II	34–10	663	468	1st, MISL	Lost Championship	6,665
2002–03	MISL II	28–8	505	317	1st, Western	Lost Championship	7,096
2003–04	MISL II	27–9	235	161	1st, Central	Lost Championship	6,012
2004–05	MISL II	24–15	219	173	1st, MISL	Won Championship	3,675
2005–06	MISL II	17–13	193	167	3rd, MISL	Lost Semifinal	4,352
2006–07	MISL II	16–14	397	360	4th, MISL	Lost Semifinal	4,618
2007–08	MISL II	22–8	424	297	2nd, MISL	Lost Semifinal	4,367
2008–09	XSL	10–10	236	216	3rd, XSL	No playoffs	4,563
2009–10	MISL III	14–6	242	201	1st, MISL	Lost Championship	3,977
2010–11	MISL III	15–5	266	191	2nd, MISL	Won Championship	4,548
2011–12	MISL III	18–6	356	264	1st, Central	Won Championship	3,955
2012–13	MISL III	21–5	310	230	2nd, MISL	Lost Semifinals	5,069
2013–14	MISL III	16–4	324	203	2nd, MISL	Lost Semifinals	4,907
2014–15	MASL	13–7	160	107	2nd, Central	Lost Division Finals	2,962
2015–16	MASL	13–7	130	114	3rd, Central	Lost Division Finals	3,504
2016–17	MASL	13–7	135	103	2nd, Central	Lost Conference Final	3,794
2017–18	MASL	17–5	172	124	1st, Central	Lost Conference Final	4,101
2018–19	MASL	21–3	187	97	1st, South Central	Won Championship	4,023
2019–20*	MASL	14–6	157	96	2nd, Eastern	No playoffs	3,847
2021	MASL	Did not participate due to the COVID-19 pandemic					
2021–22	MASL	10-14	146	162	4th, Central	Lost Quarterfinals	3,026
2022–23	MASL	15-9	154	145	1st, East	Lost Conference Final	3,396
2023–24	MASL	15-9	161	137	4th, Eastern	Lost Conference Final	3,216
2024–25	MASL	14-10	177	144	5th, MASL	Lost Semifinals	3,538
2025–26	MASL	15-9	180	144	3rd, MASL	Lost Championship	3,163
	Total	779–511; Pts % = .604	13,429	11,008			5,137

* Regular season ended early due to the COVID-19 pandemic

== Head coaches ==
Years	Name
1984–1985, 1985–1986	Dave Johnson
1985–1987	Mike Custer
1987–1990	John Dolinsky
1990–1992	Johan Aarino
1992–2014	Keith Tozer*
2014–2025	Giuliano Oliviero
2025–Present	Marcio Leite

* Keith Tozer missed parts of the 1997–98 & 1999–00 season coaching the US Futsal team. Both times, Art Kramer filled in.

== Owners ==
- (United States) Luis Antonio Ramos - Tony (1984)
- (United States) Ron Creten, Wayne Lueders, Dr. Christiansen (1985–87)
- (United States) Michael H. Bazelon (1987–2002)
- (United States) Charles Krause (2002–09)
- (United States) James Lindenberg (2009–2013)
- (United States) Sue Black (2013–2014)
- (United States) Mike Zimmerman (2014–present)

== Arenas ==
- MECCA Auditorium 1984–1988
- Bradley Center 1988–2003
- UW–Milwaukee Panther Arena 2003–present

== See also ==
- Milwaukee Wave United (former sister outdoor A-League squad in the early 2000s)
