= 2006 NCAA Division I men's soccer tournament =

Men's College Cup (semifinals & final)

Tournament details
- Country: United States
- Teams: 48

Final positions
- Champions: UC Santa Barbara (1st title)
- Runners-up: UCLA (8th title game)

Tournament statistics
- Matches played: 47
- Goals scored: 126 (2.68 per match)
- Attendance: 77,173 (1,642 per match)
- Top goal scorer(s): Sal Zizzo, UCLA (5)

Awards
- Best player: Nick Perera, UCSB (MOP offense); Andy Iro, UCSB (MOP defense)

The 2006 NCAA Division I men's soccer tournament was a tournament of 48 teams from NCAA Division I who played for the NCAA Championship in soccer. The College Cup Final Four was held at Hermann Stadium in St. Louis, Missouri. All the other games were played at the home field of the higher-seeded team. The final was held on December 3, 2006. UC Santa Barbara, UCLA, Virginia, and Wake Forest made the Final Four. UC Santa Barbara beat Wake Forest and UCLA defeated Virginia. In the final UC Santa Barbara won the title game overcoming UCLA, 2–1.

The tournament started on November 10, 2006. The first round was played on November 10 and 11. The second round on the 15th, and the third round on the 18th and 19th. The Regional Finals were played on November 24–26.

== Regional 1 ==
First round
Brown	4
Adelphi	1
Rhode Island	1(4)
Rutgers	1(2)
UAB	1(1)
Gardner-Webb	1(3)
Binghamton	1
Harvard	2

Second round
Brown	0
1	Duke	2
16	Lehigh	1(5)
Rhode Island	1(4)
Gardner-Webb	1
9	Clemson	3
8	UCLA	3
Harvard	0

Regional semifinals
1	Duke	3
16	Lehigh	0
9	Clemson	0
8	UCLA	3

Regional Finals
1	Duke	2
8	UCLA	3/OT

== Regional 2 ==
First round
Monmouth	0
St. John's	1
Illinois-Chicago	3
Western Illinois	0
New Mexico	1
San Francisco	0
Bucknell	1
George Mason	0

Second round
St. John's, NY	0
5	Maryland	2
12	Notre Dame	1
Illinois-Chicago	0
New Mexico	1
13	California	3
4	Virginia	4
Bucknell	0

Regional semifinals
5	Maryland	0
12	Notre Dame	1/2OT
13	California	1
4	Virginia	2

Regional Finals
12	Notre Dame	2
4	Virginia	3

== Regional 3 ==
First round
UC Santa Barbara	2
San Diego State	1
Winthrop	0(3)
Old Dominion	0(4)
Cincinnati	0
Northwestern	3
Virginia Tech	1
UNC-Greensboro	2

Second round
UC Santa Barbara	3
3	Southern Methodist	1
14	North Carolina	0
Old Dominion	1
Northwestern	1
11	Saint Louis	0
6	West Virginia	1
UNC-Greensboro	2/2OT

Regional semifinals
UC Santa Barbara	2
Old Dominion	1
Northwestern	2
UNC-Greensboro	1

Regional Finals
UC Santa Barbara	3
Northwestern	2

== Regional 4 ==
First round
Loyola (Illinois)	0
Northern Illinois	1/OT
Creighton	0
Washington	3
Fairfield	2
Connecticut	1
Providence	0
Hofstra	2

Second round
Northern Illinois	0
7	Indiana	1
10	Santa Clara	3
Washington	3/2OT
Fairfield	0
15	Towson	2
2	Wake Forest	5
Hofstra	1

Regional semifinals
7	Indiana	0(4)
10	Santa Clara	0(5)
15	Towson	1
2	Wake Forest	2

Regional Finals
10	Santa Clara	1
2	Wake Forest	3

== College Cup – Hermann Stadium, St. Louis, Missouri ==
National semifinals December 1 (moved to December 2 due to weather)
8	UCLA	4
4	Virginia	0
UC Santa Barbara	0(4)
2	Wake Forest	0(3)

National Championship; December 3
8	UCLA	1
UC Santa Barbara	2

== Results ==
=== First round ===
November 10, 2006	Northwestern	3–0	Cincinnati	Evanston, Illinois
2:00 EST	Alvarez 7', 83' (pen.); North 33'	Report		Stadium: Lakeside Field; Attendance: 242

November 10, 2006	St. John's	1–0	Monmouth	Queens, New York
6:00 EST	Soroka 50'	Report		Stadium: Belson Stadium; Attendance: 1,590; Referee: Jorge de la Bandera

November 10, 2006	Hofstra	2–0	Providence	Hempstead, New York
7:00 EST	Todd 59'; McCrea 66'	Report		Stadium: Hofstra University Soccer Stadium; Attendance: 1,450

November 10, 2006	Washington	3–0	Creighton	Seattle, Washington
10:00 EST	Forrest 32' (pen.), 33', 74'	Report		Stadium: Husky Soccer Stadium; Attendance: 835; Referee: Jeff Hosking

November 10, 2006	San Francisco	0–1	New Mexico	San Francisco, California
10:00 EST		Report	Brown 90'	Stadium: Negoesco Stadium; Attendance: 1,115; Referee: Dinesh Singh

November 11, 2006	Brown	4–1	Adelphi	Providence, Rhode Island
1:00 EST	Daniels 12', 15', 61'; Elenz-Martin 12'	Report	Philippou 69'	Stadium: Stevenson Field; Attendance: 1,177

November 11, 2006	George Mason	0–1 (a.e.t.)	Bucknell	Fairfax, Virginia
1:00 EST		Report	Schmiegel 96'	Stadium: George Mason Stadium; Attendance: 1,103; Referee: Steve Taylor

November 11, 2006	Harvard	2–1	Binghamton	Cambridge, Massachusetts
1:00 EST	Fucito 58'; Akpan 79'	Report	Neville 20'	Stadium: Ohiri Field; Attendance: 986; Referee: Bahij Salman

November 11, 2006	Old Dominion	0–0 (a.e.t.) (4–3 p)	Winthrop	Norfolk, Virginia
1:00 EST		Report		Stadium: Old Dominion Soccer Complex; Attendance: 605; Referee: Andy Chapin
	Penalties
	Kulp (penalty missed); Kent (penalty scored); Kinney (penalty missed); Banks (penalty scored); MacKenzie (penalty scored); Mottinger (penalty scored)		(penalty scored) Revivo; (penalty scored) Weron; (penalty missed) Kalungi; (penalty scored) Carton; (penalty missed) Mitrovich; (penalty missed) Kenga

November 11, 2006	UAB	1–1 (a.e.t.) (1–3 p)	Gardner-Webb	Birmingham, Alabama
1:00 EST	Elsner 40'	Report	Godfrey 3'	Stadium: West Campus Field; Attendance: 1,327; Referee: Jeff Hink
	Penalties
	Radcliffe (penalty missed); Klosterman (penalty scored); Elsner (penalty missed); Gumede (penalty missed)		(penalty scored) Miller; (penalty scored) Salvaggione; (penalty scored) Hughes; (penalty missed) Tasedan

November 11, 2006	Connecticut	1–2	Fairfield	Storrs, Connecticut
1:00 EST	James 54'	Report	Uy 17'; Gaughan 83'	Stadium: Morrone Stadium; Attendance: 1,657; Referee: Lou Labbadia

November 11, 2006	UNC Greensboro	2–1	Virginia Tech	Greensboro, North Carolina
1:00 EST	Campbell 78'; Jones 90'	Report	Nyarko 58'	Stadium: UNCG Soccer Stadium; Referee: Mark Kadlecik

November 11, 2006	Northern Illinois	1–0 (a.e.t.)	Loyola (Chicago)	DeKalb, Illinois
2:00 EST	McGrane 98'	Report		Stadium: NIU Soccer and Track & Field; Attendance: 500; Referee: Abbey Okulaja

November 11, 2006	UC Santa Barbara	2–1	San Diego State	Santa Barbara, California
4:00 EST	Byrne 66'; Iro 68'	Report	McDonald 55'	Stadium: Harder Stadium; Attendance: 2,356; Referee: Ali Haycock

November 11, 2006	Rutgers	1–1 (a.e.t.) (2–4 p)	Rhode Island	Piscataway, New Jersey
7:00 EST	LaBrocca 38'	Report	Gonsalves 6'	Stadium: Yurcak Field; Attendance: 1,230; Referee: Gus St. Silva
	Penalties
	LaBrocca (penalty scored); Crowley (penalty missed); Moore (penalty scored); Koffeman (penalty missed)		(penalty scored) Badecki; (penalty scored) Tumicz; (penalty scored) Cameron; (penalty scored) Bissett

November 11, 2006	Illinois-Chicago	3–0	Western Illinois	Chicago, Illinois
8:00 EST	Zambrano 14'; Cervantes 62'; Dundjer 76'	Report		Stadium: Flames Field; Attendance: 754; Referee: Ricardo Salazar

=== Second round ===
November 14, 2006	#13 California	3–1	New Mexico	Berkeley, California
4:30 EST	Wilson 2'; Ayala-Hil 32', 63'	Report	Danaher 83'	Stadium: Edwards Stadium; Attendance: 726; Referee: Said Ravanfar

November 15, 2006	#15 Towson	2–0	Fairfield	Towson, Maryland
2:00 EST	Ruck 40'; Mangione 56'	Report		Stadium: Towson Center Soccer Complex; Attendance: 941; Referee: Nate Clement

November 15, 2006	#7 Indiana	1–0	Northern Illinois	Bloomington, Indiana
7:00 EST	Ackley 20'	Report		Stadium: Bill Armstrong Stadium; Attendance: 1,048; Referee: Michael Kennedy

November 15, 2006	#5 Maryland	2–0	St. John's	College Park, Maryland
7:00 EST	Hall 26'; Zusi 57'	Report		Stadium: Ludwig Field; Attendance: 1,668; Referee: Andrew Chapin

November 15, 2006	#14 North Carolina	0–1	Old Dominion	Chapel Hill, North Carolina
7:00 EST		Report	Banks 70' (pen.)	Stadium: Fetzer Field; Attendance: 1,192; Referee: Steve Taylor

November 15, 2006	#2 Wake Forest	5–1	Hofstra	Winston-Salem, North Carolina
7:00 EST	Tracy 22', 73'; Schilawski 40', 78'; Cronin 69'	Report	Todd 80'	Stadium: W. Dennie Spry Soccer Stadium; Attendance: 1,664; Referee: Ronnie Canales

November 15, 2006	#6 West Virginia	1–2 (a.e.t.)	UNC Greensboro	Morgantown, West Virginia
7:00 EST	Wittig 70'	Report	Patterson 52'; Jones 104'	Stadium: Dick Dlesk Soccer Stadium; Attendance: 821; Referee: Hilario Grajeda

November 15, 2006	#16 Lehigh	1–1 (a.e.t.) (5–4 p)	Rhode Island	Bethlehem, Pennsylvania
7:00 EST	Gazda 84'	Report	Tumicz 18'	Stadium: Ulrich Sports Complex; Attendance: 1,271; Referee: Lee Suckle
	Penalties
	Evans (penalty scored); Taranto (penalty scored); Schram (penalty scored); Gazda (penalty scored); Franz (penalty missed); O'Reilly (penalty scored)		(penalty scored) Badecki; (penalty scored) Tumicz; (penalty scored) Cameron; (penalty missed) Bissett; (penalty scored) Gonsalves; (penalty missed) Mellen

November 15, 2006	#4 Virginia	4–0	Bucknell	Charlottesville, Virginia
7:00 EST	Cristman 27'; Colaluca 28'; Holder 44'; Villanueva 49'	Report		Stadium: Klöckner Stadium; Attendance: 2,083; Referee: Mario Scilipoti

November 15, 2006	#12 Notre Dame	1–0	Illinois-Chicago	Notre Dame, Indiana
7:00 EST	Lapira 44'	Report		Stadium: Alumni Stadium; Attendance: 463; Referee: Abbey Okulaja

November 15, 2006	#1 Duke	2–0	Brown	Durham, North Carolina
7:00 EST	Videira 27'; Grella 47'	Report		Stadium: Koskinen Stadium; Attendance: 2,337; Referee: Peter Dhima

November 15, 2006	#3 SMU	1–3	UC Santa Barbara	University Park, Texas
8:00 EST	Corbin 41'	Report	Perera 32'; Walker 43'; Avila 76'	Stadium: Westcott Field; Attendance: 1,012; Referee: Misail Tsapos

November 15, 2006	#8 UCLA	3–0	Harvard	Los Angeles, California
10:00 EST	Zizzo 2', 40'; Nakazawa 74'	Report		Stadium: Drake Stadium; Attendance: 769; Referee: Steve Elliott

November 15, 2006	#10 Santa Clara	3–2 (a.e.t.)	Washington	Santa Clara, California
10:00 EST	Ustruck 43'; Martin 46'; Ogunbiyi 95'	Report	Fischer 61'; Mohn 81'	Stadium: Buck Shaw Stadium; Attendance: 944; Referee: Colin Arblaster

November 16, 2006	#11 Saint Louis	0–1	Northwestern	St. Louis, Missouri
5:00 EST		Report	Roth 20'	Stadium: Hermann Stadium; Attendance: 1,079; Referee: Shane Butler

November 16, 2006	#9 Clemson	3–1	Gardner-Webb	Clemson, South Carolina
6:00 EST	Richards 12' (pen.); Moore 77'; Moojen 78' (pen.)	Report	Salvaggione 79'	Stadium: Riggs Field; Attendance: 920; Referee: Mark Kadlecik

=== Third round ===
November 18, 2006	#5 Maryland	0–1 (a.e.t.)	#12 Notre Dame	College Park, Maryland
6:00 EST		Report	Lapira 107'	Stadium: Ludwig Field; Attendance: 2,769; Referee: Erich Simmons

November 18, 2006	Old Dominion	1–2	UC Santa Barbara	Norfolk, Virginia
7:00 EST	MacKenzie 57' (pen.)	Report	Perera 7'; Avila 61'	Stadium: Old Dominion Soccer Complex; Attendance: 1,481; Referee: Peter Dhima

November 18, 2006	#7 Indiana	0–0 (a.e.t.) (4–5 p)	#10 Santa Clara	Bloomington, Indiana
7:00 EST		Report		Stadium: Bill Armstrong Stadium; Attendance: 2,138; Referee: Hilario Grajeda
	Penalties
	Alston (penalty scored); Weaver (penalty scored); Ring (penalty scored); Jo. Tudela (penalty scored); Ackley (penalty missed); Mellencamp (penalty missed)		(penalty scored) Hatzke; (penalty scored) Lowry; (penalty missed) Ustruck; (penalty scored) Ogunbiyi; (penalty scored) Martin; (penalty scored) DeVey

November 18, 2006	#4 Virginia	2–1	#13 California	Charlottesville, Virginia
7:00 EST	Reyering 65', 74'	Report	Serafini 30'	Stadium: Klöckner Stadium; Attendance: 3,644; Referee: Bahij Salman

November 19, 2006	Northwestern	2–1	UNC Greensboro	Evanston, Illinois
1:00 EST	Usinger 9' (pen.); Alvarez 23'	Report	Fitzgerald 9'	Stadium: Lakeside Field; Attendance: 623

November 19, 2006	#1 Duke	3–0	#16 Lehigh	Durham, North Carolina
1:00 EST	Videira 20'; Wadsworth 27'; Grella 71'	Report		Stadium: Koskinen Stadium; Attendance: 3,182; Referee: Steve Taylor

November 19, 2006	#2 Wake Forest	2–1	#15 Towson	Winston-Salem, North Carolina
2:00 EST	Curfman 65'; Schilawski 77'	Report	Healey 90' (pen.)	Stadium: W. Dennie Spry Soccer Stadium; Attendance: 2,118; Referee: Mark Kadlecik

November 19, 2006	#8 UCLA	3–0	#9 Clemson	Los Angeles, California
8:00 EST	Estrada 11', 90'; Zizzo 25'	Report		Stadium: Drake Stadium; Attendance: 815; Referee: Alex Gorin

=== Quarterfinals ===
November 24, 2006	#4 Virginia	3–2	#12 Notre Dame	Charlottesville, Virginia
6:00 EST	Cristman 25', 71'; Reyering 35'	Report	Martin 71', 84' (pen.)	Stadium: Klöckner Stadium; Attendance: 5,850; Referee: Shane Butler

November 24, 2006	#2 Wake Forest	3–1	#10 Santa Clara	Winston-Salem, North Carolina
7:00 EST	Curfman 42'; Lahoud 76'; Thompson 84'	Report	Lowry 24' (pen.)	Stadium: W. Dennie Spry Soccer Stadium; Attendance: 3,520; Referee: Abbey Okulaja

November 25, 2006	UC Santa Barbara	3–2	Northwestern	Santa Barbara, California
10:00 EST	Rosenlund 10', 48', 63'	Report	North 13'; Alvarez 38'	Stadium: Harder Stadium; Attendance: 8,784; Referee: Ed Shea

November 26, 2006	#1 Duke	2–3 (a.e.t.)	#8 UCLA	Durham, North Carolina
1:00 EST	Wadsworth 1'; Loftus 19'	Report	Leopoldo 41'; Zizzo 78', 91'	Stadium: Koskinen Stadium; Attendance: 4,130; Referee: Misail Tsapos

=== College Cup ===
==== Semifinals ====
December 2, 2006	#4 Virginia	0–4	#8 UCLA	St. Louis, Missouri
12:00 EST		Report	Estrada 64', 66'; Myers 84'; Stephens 89'	Stadium: Hermann Stadium; Attendance: 6,314; Referee: Hilario Grajeda

December 2, 2006	#2 Wake Forest	0–0 (a.e.t.) (3–4 p)	UC Santa Barbara	St. Louis, Missouri
2:30 EST		Report		Stadium: Hermann Stadium; Attendance: 6,314; Referee: Michael Kennedy
	Penalties
	Curfman (penalty scored); Clayton (penalty scored); Solle (penalty missed); Cronin (penalty scored); Schilawski (penalty missed)		(penalty scored) Perera; (penalty scored) Frimpong; (penalty scored) Pontius; (penalty missed) Byrne; (penalty scored) Avila

==== Championship ====
December 3, 2006	#8 UCLA	1–2	UC Santa Barbara	St. Louis, Missouri
3:00 EST	Leopoldo 79'	Report	Perera 3'; Avila 61'	Stadium: Hermann Stadium; Attendance: 5,948; Referee: Erich Simmons

== Statistics ==
=== Goalscorers ===
5 goals

- (United States) Sal Zizzo — UCLA

4 goals

- (Argentina) Gerardo Alvarez — Northwestern
- (United States) David Estrada — UCLA

3 goals

- (United States) Andrew Daniels — Brown
- (United States) Eric Avila — UC Santa Barbara
- (United States) Nick Perera — UC Santa Barbara
- (Canada) Tyler Rosenlund — UC Santa Barbara
- (United States) Adam Cristman — Virginia
- (Germany) Yannick Reyering — Virginia
- (United States) Zack Schilawski — Wake Forest
- (United States) Kevin Forrest — Washington

2 goals

- (United States) Javier Ayala-Hil — California
- (United States) Mike Grella — Duke
- (United States) Michael Videira — Duke
- (United States) Spencer Wadsworth — Duke
- (England) Michael Todd — Hofstra
- (United States) Brad North — Northwestern
- (Republic of Ireland) Joseph Lapira — Notre Dame
- (United States) Kurt Martin — Notre Dame
- (United States) Jason Leopoldo — UCLA
- (Puerto Rico) Scott Jones — UNC Greensboro
- (United States) Steven Curfman — Wake Forest
- (United States) Marcus Tracy — Wake Forest

1 goal

- (United States) Rob Philippou — Adelphi
- (Scotland) Barry Neville — Binghamton
- (United States) Nick Elenz-Martin — Brown
- (United States) Mark Schmiegel — Bucknell
- (United States) Jeff Serafini — California
- (United States) Jacob Wilson — California
- (Brazil) Frederico Moojen — Clemson
- (United States) Bryson Moore — Clemson
- (Jamaica) Dane Richards — Clemson
- (Trinidad and Tobago) Julius James — Connecticut
- (United States) Chris Loftus — Duke
- (United States) Jimmy Gaughan — Fairfield
- (United States) Christian Uy — Fairfield
- (Jamaica) Richard Godfrey — Gardner-Webb
- (United States) Chris Salvaggione — Gardner-Webb
- (United States) Andre Akpan — Harvard
- (United States) Mike Fucito — Harvard
- (England) Rory McCrea — Hofstra
- (United States) Eric Cervantes — Illinois-Chicago
- (Serbia) Pavle Dundjer — Illinois-Chicago
- (United States) Cesar Zambrano — Illinois-Chicago
- (United States) Brian Ackley — Indiana
- (United States) Adam Gazda — Lehigh
- (Puerto Rico) Jeremy Hall — Maryland
- (United States) Graham Zusi — Maryland
- (United States) Stephen Brown — New Mexico
- (United States) Blake Danaher — New Mexico
- (United States) Justin McGrane — Northern Illinois
- (United States) David Roth — Northwestern
- (United States) Brian Usinger — Northwestern
- (United States) Trevor Banks — Old Dominion
- (Scotland) Ross MacKenzie — Old Dominion
- (Canada) Jeffrey Gonsalves — Rhode Island
- (Poland) Łukasz Tumicz — Rhode Island
- (United States) Nick LaBrocca — Rutgers
- (United States) Freddy McDonald — San Diego State
- (United States) Peter Lowry — Santa Clara
- (United States) Brian Martin — Santa Clara
- (United States) Babajide Ogunbiyi — Santa Clara
- (Guam) Erik Ustruck — Santa Clara
- (United States) Scott Corbin — SMU
- (United States) Ryan Soroka — St. John's
- (United States) Nino Mangione — Towson
- (United States) Pat Healey — Towson
- (United States) Kevin Ruck — Towson
- (United States) Shane Elsner — UAB
- (Republic of Ireland) Bryan Byrne — UC Santa Barbara
- (England) Andy Iro — UC Santa Barbara
- (United States) David Walker — UC Santa Barbara
- (United States) Chance Myers — UCLA
- (United States) Kyle Nakazawa — UCLA
- (United States) Michael Stephens — UCLA
- (United States) Thomas Campbell — UNC Greensboro
- (United States) Michael Fitzgerald — UNC Greensboro
- (Trinidad and Tobago) Randi Patterson — UNC Greensboro
- (United States) Nico Colaluca — Virginia
- (United States) Ian Holder — Virginia
- (United States) Jonathan Villanueva — Virginia
- (Ghana) Patrick Nyarko — Virginia Tech
- (United States) Sam Cronin — Wake Forest
- (Sierra Leone) Michael Lahoud — Wake Forest
- (United States) Wells Thompson — Wake Forest
- (United States) Matt Fischer — Washington
- (United States) Steve Mohn — Washington
- (United States) Chris Wittig — West Virginia
