= 2014–15 Rochester Lancers season =

Rochester Lancers
2014–15 MASL season
- Owner/CEO: Salvatore Fantauzzo
- Head Coach: Doug Miller
- Arena: Blue Cross Arena; 1 War Memorial Square; Rochester, New York 14614
- Major Arena Soccer League: 3rd, Eastern (regular season)
- Ron Newman Cup: Lost Division Final
- Top goalscorer: Mauricio Salles (41 goals, 16 assists)
- Highest home attendance: 10,215 (March 1 vs. Baltimore Blast)
- Lowest home attendance: 5,004 (December 20 vs. Syracuse Silver Knights)
- Average home league attendance: 6,539 (10 games)

The 2014–15 Rochester Lancers season was the fourth and final season of the Rochester Lancers professional indoor soccer club. The Lancers, an Eastern Division team in the Major Arena Soccer League, played their home games at Blue Cross Arena in downtown Rochester, New York.

The team was led by owner Salvatore "Soccer Sam" Fantauzzo and head coach Doug Miller. The Lancers finished the regular season with a 10–10 record, making this the first season in the team's four-year history with a record at or above .500. They won the first round of the MASL playoffs but lost to the Baltimore Blast in the Eastern Division final. In July 2015, the team cited a sharp increase in the cost of insurance to more than double the team's payroll costs and announced the end of the franchise.

== Season summary ==
The Lancers began on an up note by defeating the Detroit Waza in overtime, winning their season opener for the first time in franchise history. The team then lost an overtime decision to the Ontario Fury before their first of two three-game winning streaks on the season. The Lancers lost 7 of their next 8 games, defeating only the Detroit Waza between December 27 and January 24. Of the Lancers' 10 wins in the regular season, 3 came from sweeping the season series against Detroit, another 4 from sweeping the Harrisburg Heat, and the remaining 3 from splitting their 6-game series against the Syracuse Silver Knights. The Lancers lost all 4 of their regular season matchups against the Baltimore Blast and all 3 of their games against non-division opponents. Their 10–10 record was good enough for third place in the Eastern Division and a spot in the playoffs. There they defeated Syracuse in a best-of-3 series before facing Baltimore on the road for a winner-take-all Eastern Division Final. The Lancers fell 6–4 to the Blast, ending their season.

== History ==
Launched as an expansion team in the third Major Indoor Soccer League for the 2011–12 season, Rochester went a combined 27–43 in their three seasons as members of the MISL, qualifying for the playoffs only once. After the 2013-14 season, several teams withdrew from the MISL, leading to the league's collapse. Along with five other former MISL teams, the Lancers joined the teams of the Professional Arena Soccer League, which was soon rebranded as the Major Arena Soccer League. The other teams in the Eastern Division are former MISL clubs Baltimore Blast and Syracuse Silver Knights, plus PASL clubs Detroit Waza and Harrisburg Heat.

== Off-field moves ==
Four of the five Eastern Division teams (the three former MISL clubs plus Harrisburg) keep score with multi-point scoring at their home games. Most goals are worth two points but goals scored from outside a 45-foot arc on the turf are worth three points. Games played at Detroit or in the Central, Southern, and Pacific Divisions will be scored with traditional soccer scoring where each goal is worth one point.

On December 27, the team will induct four new members into the Rochester Lancers Wall of Fame: former players Dave Sarachan, Eli Durante, and Peter Short plus former television play-by-play announcer Rich Funke. All four were connected to the original Rochester Lancers of the North American Soccer League.

The team's home arena turf, purchased by the city of Rochester in 2011 for $150,000, came under public scrutiny in January after the Baltimore Blast blamed the turf's poor condition for injuries to two of its players. Lancers owner Salvatore Fantauzzo described the turf as "the worst turf in pro indoor soccer". In March 2014, the team revealed it was in negotiations to relocate to Dome Arena at The Dome Center in suburban Henrietta, New York.

== Schedule ==
Win Loss

=== Regular season ===
Game	Day	Date	Kickoff	Opponent	Results		Location	Attendance
Game	Day	Date	Kickoff	Opponent	Score	Record	Location	Attendance
1	Saturday	November 8	7:05pm	at Detroit Waza♣	W 9–8 (OT)	1–0	Melvindale Civic Center	554
2	Saturday	November 22	7:00pm	Ontario Fury	L 13–15 (OT)	1–1	Blue Cross Arena	8,214
3	Saturday	November 29	7:00pm	Detroit Waza	W 16–5	2–1	Blue Cross Arena	5,819
4	Saturday	December 6	7:05pm	at Harrisburg Heat	W 11–4	3–1	Farm Show Large Arena	1,973
5	Saturday	December 20	1:00pm	Syracuse Silver Knights	W 12–11 (SO)	4–1	Blue Cross Arena	5,004
6	Saturday	December 27	1:00pm	Baltimore Blast	L 8–19	4–2	Blue Cross Arena	6,230
7	Thursday	January 1	4:00pm	Syracuse Silver Knights	L 10–18	4–3	Blue Cross Arena	6,850
8	Saturday	January 3	6:05pm	at Milwaukee Wave♣	L 4–7	4–4	UW–Milwaukee Panther Arena	2,357
9	Sunday	January 4	3:05pm	at Chicago Mustangs♣	L 4–5 (OT)	4–5	Sears Centre	991
10	Friday	January 9	7:30pm	at Syracuse Silver Knights	L 15–21	4–6	Oncenter War Memorial Arena	2,857
11	Saturday	January 10	1:00pm	Detroit Waza	W 25–13	5–6	Blue Cross Arena	5,689
12	Friday	January 16	7:30pm	at Syracuse Silver Knights	L 11–12	5–7	Oncenter War Memorial Arena	3,217
13	Saturday	January 24	6:05pm	at Baltimore Blast	L 7–15	5–8	Royal Farms Arena	6,942
14	Sunday	January 25	4:00pm	Syracuse Silver Knights	W 10–8	6–8	Blue Cross Arena	7,105
15	Saturday	January 31	7:05pm	at Harrisburg Heat	W 21–12	7–8	Farm Show Large Arena	4,455
16	Friday	February 13	7:35pm	at Baltimore Blast	L 0–11	7–9	Royal Farms Arena	6,761
17	Saturday	February 14	1:05pm	Harrisburg Heat	W 28–10	8–9	Blue Cross Arena	5,150
18	Thursday	February 19	7:00pm	Harrisburg Heat	W 33–5	9–9	Blue Cross Arena	5,117
19	Sunday	February 22	4:00pm	at Syracuse Silver Knights	W 9–7	10–9	Oncenter War Memorial Arena	3,429
20	Sunday	March 1	4:00pm	Baltimore Blast	L 23–25	10–10	Blue Cross Arena	10,215

♣ Game played with traditional soccer scoring (all goals worth 1 point).

=== Post-season ===
Game	Day	Date	Kickoff	Opponent	Results		Location	Attendance
Game	Day	Date	Kickoff	Opponent	Score	Record	Location	Attendance
Division Playoff #1	Thursday	March 5	7:35pm	Syracuse Silver Knights	W 20–7	1–0	Blue Cross Arena	5,129
Division Playoff #2	Sunday	March 8	4:00pm	at Syracuse Silver Knights	L 6–17	1–1	Oncenter War Memorial Arena	4,355
Division Playoff #3	Sunday	March 8	6:30pm^{1}	at Syracuse Silver Knights	W 3–2	2–1	Oncenter War Memorial Arena	4,355
Division Final	Wednesday	March 11	7:05pm	at Baltimore Blast	L 4–6	2–2	Royal Farms Arena	5,544

^{1} Mini-game played as a tie-breaker.

== Awards and honors ==
The Lancers' team awards were presented to team captain Mauricio Salles as Team MVP, forward Joey Tavernese as Offensive Player of the Year, defender Jake Schindler as Defensive Player of the Year, and defender Brad Vanino as Rookie of the Year. The team's Community Service Award was presented to Elliot Fauske as the player that "best exemplifies character and dedication to the community". This is Fauske's third consecutive win.

Rochester forward Mauricio Salles was selected for the 2014-15 MASL All-League Second Team. Rochester's Yakiel Perez and goalkeeper Marcelo Mareira earned honorable mentions for the league's all-rookie team for 2014-15.
