= Joey Tavernese =

American soccer player (born 1989)

Personal information
- Full name: Joey Tavernese
- Date of birth: July 17, 1989 (age 37)
- Place of birth: Garden City, New York, United States
- Height: 5 ft 8 in (1.73 m)
- Position: Midfielder

Team information
- Current team: Harrisburg Heat
- Number: 27

Youth career
- –2007: Terryville Fire

College career
Years	Team	Apps	(Gls)
2007–2010	Siena Saints	75	(11)

Senior career*
Years	Team	Apps	(Gls)
2011	Westchester Flames	2	(0)
2011	F.C. New York	18	(0)
2012	Armadale SC	20	(14)
2012–2015	Rochester Lancers (indoor)	45	(35)
2015	Ontario Fury (indoor)	4	(1)
2015–2019	Utica City (indoor)	74	(90)
2019–2021	Florida Tropics (indoor)	25	(16)
2021–2023	Utica City (indoor)	37	(29)
2023	Florida Tropics (indoor)	9	(2)
2023–2024	Rochester Lancers 2 (indoor)	9	(16)
2023–	Harrisburg Heat (indoor)	13	(5)

International career
- United States arena United States Futsal

Managerial career
- 2020: Florida Tropics (assistant)
- 2023–2024: Rochester Lancers 2 (assistant)
- * Club domestic league appearances and goals as of November 27, 2024

Joey Tavernese (born July 17, 1989) is an American soccer, indoor, and futsal player who is currently playing for the Harrisburg Heat in the Major Arena Soccer League.

== Youth ==
Tavernese played for the Terryville Fire, who were the 2007 National Champions. He posted a goal in the National semi-finals to send the Fire into the National Championship.

== College ==
Tavernese played four years of college soccer at Siena College. In 2007, he started nine games in his 19 appearances and was selected to the MAAC All-Rookie Team. In 2008, he started 13 games in his 18 appearances and finished with 3 goals and 1 assist. In 2009, he made 19 and finished with 3 goals and 5 assists. In 2010, he made 19 appearances and finished with a career high 4 goals and 9 assists.

== Professional ==
After starting 2011 in the USL Premier Development League for the Westchester Flames, Tavernese signed for USL Pro club F.C. New York on June 23, 2011. On July 4, Tavernese record his first career point. Assisting on a Jhonny Arteaga goal in New York's 3–1 home loss against the Charlotte Eagles. He is currently playing for the Syracuse Silver Knights. Tavernese was named offensive MVP for the Silver Knights in 2016.

On May 30, 2019, Tavernese signed with Florida Tropics SC.

Tavernese joined the coaching staff of Major Arena Soccer League 2 side Rochester Lancers 2 in January 2023.
