= 2008 MLS supplemental draft =

College draft for soccer teams

The 2008 MLS supplemental draft was held on January 24, 2008, six days after the 2008 MLS SuperDraft, as teams filled out their developmental rosters.

== Changes from 2007 ==
- 2008 expansion club San Jose Earthquakes received the first pick in each round.

== Round 1 ==
Pick #	MLS team	Player	Position	Affiliation
1	San Jose Earthquakes	(Liberia) Adam Smarte	F	Cal-Santa Cruz
2	Toronto FC	(United States) Xavier Balc	F	Ohio State
3	Colorado Rapids (Note: #3: Real Salt Lake → Colorado Rapids. 13 July 2007: Colorado Rapids acquired this first-round selection and a second-round pick in the 2009 Supplemental Draft from Real Salt Lake in exchange for defender Chris Wingert. The Supplemental Draft was not held in 2009. It is unknown what compensation, if any, Colorado received in lieu of the 2009 Supplemental Draft pick.)	(United States) Kevin Forrest	F	Washington
4	Los Angeles Galaxy	(United States) Michael Gavin	D	Portland
5	Colorado Rapids	(United States) Cesar Zambrano	M	Illinois-Chicago
6	Columbus Crew	(United States) Billy Chiles	GK	Towson University
7	New York Red Bulls	(South Africa) Danleigh Borman	M	Rhode Island
8	New England Revolution (Note: #8: FC Dallas → New England Revolution. 31 August 2007: New England Revolution acquired this first-round selection from FC Dallas in exchange for salary budget considerations.)	(Zimbabwe) Kheli Dube	F	Coastal Carolina
9	Chivas USA	(United States) Kraig Chiles	F	San Diego State
10	D.C. United	(United States) Brandon Owens	D	UCLA
11	Kansas City Wizards	(United States) Pat Healey	M	Towson University
12	Chicago Fire	(United States) Kai Kasiguran	M	Messiah College
13	New England Revolution	(United States) Chris Tierney	D	Virginia
14	Houston Dynamo	(United States) Johnny Alcaraz	M	UC Santa Barbara; Westmont College

== Round 2 ==
Pick #	MLS team	Player	Position	Affiliation
15	San Jose Earthquakes	(United States) Tim Bohnenkamp	F	Creighton
16	Toronto FC	PASS		
17	Real Salt Lake	(United States) Tino Nuñez	F	UC Santa Barbara; Bakersfield Brigade
18	Los Angeles Galaxy	(United States) Charles Alamo	GK	UC Riverside
19	Colorado Rapids	(United States) Mike Graczyk	GK	New Mexico
20	Columbus Crew	(United States) Cory Elenio	F	University of Evansville
21	New York Red Bulls	(United States) Mike Palacio	M	Stony Brook University
22	FC Dallas	(Germany) Yannick Reyering	F	Virginia
23	Chivas USA	(United States) Javier Ayala-Hill	F	University of California
24	D.C. United	(England) Dan Stratford	M	West Virginia University
25	Kansas City Wizards	(Bolivia) Vicente Arze	M	Mercer University
26	Chicago Fire	(Romania) Adrian Bumbut	F	Liberty
27	New England Revolution	(United States) Kyle Altman	M	Trinity
28	Houston Dynamo	(United States) Craig Thompson	M	Colorado School of Mines

=== Round 2 trades ===
No trades reported.

== Round 3 ==
Pick #	MLS team	Player	Position	Affiliation
29	San Jose Earthquakes	(United States) Greg Curry	D	UC Santa Barbara; Bakersfield Brigade
30	Toronto FC	PASS		
31	Real Salt Lake	(United States) Kevin Reiman	M	Michigan State
32	Los Angeles Galaxy	(United States) Greg Folk	D	UCLA
33	Colorado Rapids	(United States) Daniel Antunez	M	Hartford
34	Columbus Crew	(Poland) Lukasz Tumicz	F	University of Rhode Island
35	New York Red Bulls	(United States) John Gilkerson	D	Winthrop
36	FC Dallas	(United States) Ben Shuleva	M	SMU
37	Chivas USA	(Ivory Coast) El-Hadj Cissé	M	North Carolina State
38	Columbus Crew (Note: #38: D.C. United → Columbus Crew. 4 April 2007: Columbus Crew acquired this third-round selection from D.C. United in exchange for forward Marc Burch.)	(United States) Zola Short	D	Virginia
39	Kansas City Wizards	(United States) Tom Gray	M	Monmouth University
40	Chicago Fire	(United States) Zach Pope	M	Duke
41	New England Revolution	(Kenya) Saïdi Isaac	F	Winthrop
42	Houston Dynamo	(United States) Kieran Hall	M	Fort Lewis College

== Round 4 ==
Pick #	MLS team	Player	Position	Affiliation
43	San Jose Earthquakes	(United States) Tim Jepson	D	Duke University
44	Toronto FC	PASS		
45	Real Salt Lake	(United States) Kenny Anaba	F	University of Cincinnati
46	Los Angeles Galaxy	(United States) Daniel de Geer	M/F	University of San Francisco
47	Chicago Fire (Note: #47: Colorado Rapids → Chicago Fire. 2 March 2007: Chicago Fire acquired this fourth-round selection, originally a conditional pick, from Colorado Rapids in exchange for goalkeeper Zach Thornton.)	(United States) Steve Bode	D	University of Wisconsin–Milwaukee
48	Chicago Fire (Note: #48: Columbus Crew → Chicago Fire. 14 September 2007: Chicago Fire acquired this fourth-round selection from Columbus Crew in exchange for defender Leonard Griffin.)	(United States) Tim Conway	M	Nyack College
49	New York Red Bulls	(United States) Laurent Manuel	D/M	Brown University
50	FC Dallas	PASS		
51	Chivas USA	(United States) André Sherard	D	North Carolina
52	D.C. United	(United States) James Thorpe	GK	Franklin Pierce
53	Kansas City Wizards	(United States) Andrew Kartunen	GK	Stanford University
54	Chicago Fire	(Canada) Melford James, Jr.	GK	University of Montevallo
55	New England Revolution	PASS		
56	Houston Dynamo	(United States) James Georgeff	F	Central Florida
