= Juan Pablo Reyes =

Ecuadorian footballer (born 1985)

Personal information
- Full name: Juan Pablo Reyes
- Date of birth: August 2, 1985 (age 41)
- Place of birth: Guayaquil, Ecuador
- Height: 6 ft 0 in (1.83 m)
- Position: Defender

Team information
- Current team: Florida Tropics
- Number: 23

Senior career*
Years	Team	Apps	(Gls)
2006	Cocoa Expos	10	(0)
2007	Central Florida Kraze	15	(0)
2007–08	Orlando Sharks (indoor)	5	(0)
2008	Rochester Rhinos	15	(0)
2009	Rockford Rampage (indoor)		
2010	Manta		
2011	Central Florida Kraze	12	(0)
2011	Rochester Lancers (indoor)	7	(0)
2012	Syracuse Silver Knights (indoor)	2	(0)
2013	Tampa Marauders		
2014–15	Rochester Lancers (indoor)	16	(0)
2016–	Florida Tropics (indoor)	75	(5)
2017	Lakeland Tropics	0	(0)
2018	Rochester Lancers	4	(0)
2019	Orlando FC Barca		
2019	Central Florida Panthers	7	(0)
2021	Tropics SC		
2021	Central Florida Panthers	2	(0)

Managerial career
- 2021: Florida Tropics (assistant)
- 2021: Tropics SC
- 2021: Central Florida Panthers
- * Club domestic league appearances and goals as of 18 January 2023

Juan Pablo Reyes (born August 2, 1985) is an Ecuadorian footballer who currently plays for Florida Tropics SC in the Major Arena Soccer League.

== Career ==
=== Youth and amateur ===
Reyes grew up in Florida, attending William R. Boone High School where he was an All State soccer player, and playing club soccer for the Ajax American soccer club. Reyes did not play college soccer, but did play in the USL Premier Development League for the Cocoa Expos in 2006 and Central Florida Kraze in 2007.

=== Professional ===
Reyes spent the 2007-2008 indoor season with the Orlando Sharks of the second Major Indoor Soccer League. On April 16, 2008, the Rochester Rhinos of the USL First Division announced the signing of Reyes. Bill Sedgewick, a former Rhinos player, recommended Reyes to the Rhinos coaching staff.

After a year out of the competitive game in 2009, Reyes returned to play for Central Florida Kraze in the PDL in 2010, making his first appearance of the season on June 24 against the Bradenton Academics.
