= Michael Cunningham (footballer, born 1991) =

English footballer

Personal information
- Full name: Michael Lewis Cunningham
- Date of birth: 5 February 1991 (age 35)
- Place of birth: Nottingham, England
- Height: 1.82 m (6 ft 0 in)
- Position: Forward

Youth career
- –2009: Nike Academy
- 2010: Luton Town

College career
Years	Team	Apps	(Gls)
2011–2014	Roberts Wesleyan Redhawks	76	(30)

Senior career*
Years	Team	Apps	(Gls)
2014	Southern California Seahorses	14	(1)
2016	Northcote City	11	(0)
2016	Quorn		
2017	Syracruse Silver Knights (indoor)	8	(0)
2018–2020	Rochester Lancers (indoor)	30	(20)
2019–2020	Rochester Lancers	10	(4)
2021	FC Tulsa	1	(0)
2021	→ Stumptown AC (loan)	2	(0)
2021–2022	Harrisburg Heat (indoor)	18	(9)
2022−2023	Flower City Union	6	(0)
- * Club domestic league appearances and goals as of 31 October 2024

Michael Lewis Cunningham (born 5 February 1991) is an English footballer who plays as a forward.

== Career ==
=== Youth ===
Cunningham played with various local sides before attending the Nike Academy, where he impressed enough to earn an academy contract at Luton Town in 2010.

=== College & Semi Professional ===
Following his release from Luton Town, Cunningham applied to various colleges in the United States, eventually been offered a scholarship to play college soccer at NCAA Division II college Roberts Wesleyan College in New York. At Roberts Wesleyan, Cunningham made 76 appearances, scoring 30 goals and tallying 17 assists over four seasons and was twice named First Team NCCAA All-American, in 2012 and 2014.

In the summer of 2014, Cunningham also appeared for USL Premier Development League side Southern California Seahorses.

=== Professional ===
Cunningham signed his first professional contract In January 2016 with Australian NPL Victoria 2 side Northcote City FC. He went on to make 11 appearances for the club.

Following a spell in Australia, Cunningham had a short stint with Midland Premier League side Quorn in the second half of 2016.

Cunningham returned to the United States in 2017, joining MASL indoor soccer side Syracruse Silver Knights and later Rochester Lancers. With Rochester in 2018, Cunningham scored 13 goals in 13 appearances. He made a single appearance for the indoor team in 2019, and scored 7 in 17 appearances in 2020. Rochester also operate an outdoor team who compete in the NPSL, who Cunningham played with in 2019, scoring 4 goals in 10 regular season appearances. The 2020 season was cancelled due to the COVID-19 pandemic.

On 7 April 2021, Cunningham joined USL Championship side FC Tulsa following a successful trial. He made his debut for the club on 19 May 2021, appearing as a 74th-minute substitute during a 5–0 loss to Atlanta United 2.

On 20 September 2021, Cunningham joined National Independent Soccer Association club Stumptown AC on a loan deal.

== Personal ==
As well as playing professionally, Cunningham also operates a YouTube channel and podcast under his 7mlc brand, which has almost two million subscribers.
