= Mauricio Salles =

Brazilian footballer (born 1978)

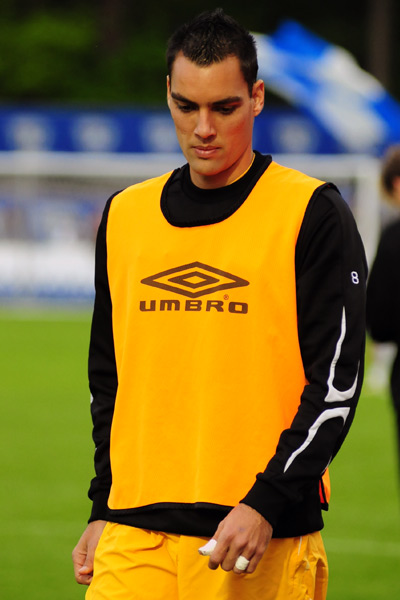
- Salles with the Puerto Rico Islanders

Personal information
- Full name: Mauricio Salles de Alencar
- Date of birth: 1 March 1978 (age 48)
- Place of birth: Salvador, Brazil
- Position: Forward

Senior career*
Years	Team	Apps	(Gls)
1997	Vitória		
1998–1999	Atlético Paranaense		
2000–2001	Botafogo		
2002–2003	Olmedo		
2004–2005	Puerto Rico Islanders	51	(25)
2006	Montreal Impact	26	(9)
2007	Atlanta Silverbacks	0	(0)
2007	Omiya Ardija	8	(1)
2008–2009	Rochester Rhinos	34	(5)
2009–2010	Kazma		
2010–2011	Itabuna		
2011–2015	Rochester Lancers (indoor)	87	(119)
2012	Charlotte Eagles	22	(3)
2013	VSI Tampa Bay	23	(10)
2015–2017	Ontario Fury (indoor)	29	(39)
2017	Soles de Sonora (indoor)	15	(16)
2017–2018	Florida Tropics (indoor)	20	(19)
2018–2020	Utica City (indoor)	20	(13)
- * Club domestic league appearances and goals as of 17 December 2022

Mauricio Salles de Alencar (born 1 March 1978) is a Brazilian professional footballer. On 20 January 2010, he was ranked 25th in the USL First Division Top 25 of the Decade, which announced a list of the best and most influential players of the previous decade.

== Career ==
=== South America ===
Salles turned professional in 1997, and has played with Brazilian sides Vitória, Atlético Paranaense and Botafogo, as well as in Ecuador for Olmedo.

=== North America ===
Salles began his professional career in the United States in 2004 with the Puerto Rico Islanders where he is all time highest goal scorer. He later left for the Montreal Impact in 2006, and then to the Atlanta Silverbacks in January 2007. That same season he moved to Japan with Omiya Ardija, where he scored one goal in eight appearances, before returning to the United States with the Rochester Rhinos in 2008.

In February 2015, the Rochester Lancers named team captain Salles as Team MVP for the 2014–15 season. In March 2015, the Major Arena Soccer League named Salles to the 2014-15 MASL All-League Second Team.

=== Asia ===
Salles signed for Kazma in the Kuwaiti Premier League in the summer of 2009.
