= Billy Chiles =

American soccer player (born 1985)

Personal information
- Full name: William Chiles
- Date of birth: January 14, 1985 (age 41)
- Place of birth: Washington, D.C., United States
- Height: 6 ft 3 in (1.91 m)
- Position: Goalkeeper

College career
Years	Team	Apps	(Gls)
2003–2005	Rutgers Scarlet Knights		
2006–2007	Towson Tigers		

Senior career*
Years	Team	Apps	(Gls)
2009–2010	Crystal Palace Baltimore	2	(0)

Managerial career
- 2009–2013: Towson Tigers (assistant)
- 2014–2016: Springbrook Blue Devils
- 2016–2021: George Mason Patriots (assistant)
- 2022–: South Florida Bulls (assistant)
- * Club domestic league appearances and goals as of 13 May 2022

Billy Chiles (born January 14, 1985, in Washington, D.C.) is an American retired soccer player who is currently an assistant coach for the South Florida Bulls.

== Career ==
=== Youth and college ===
Chiles grew up in Silver Spring, Maryland, and played college soccer at Towson University, where he was a NSCAA 2nd Team All American, was named to the 1st Team All-CAA, and the CAA All Tournament Team in 2007–2008

=== Professional ===
Chiles was drafted by Columbus Crew in the first round (6th overall) of the 2008 MLS Supplemental Draft, and spent the 2008 pre-season training the team, but ultimately was not offered a professional contract.

He signed with Crystal Palace Baltimore in the USL Second Division in 2009, and made his professional debut on May 15, 2009, in a game against Western Mass Pioneers.

=== Coaching ===
During his professional playing career, Chiles also served as assistant coach and director of operations for his alma mater, the Towson Tigers. In 2015, Chiles joined the coaching staff of the George Mason Patriots. Chiles joined the South Florida Bulls staff on May 13, 2022.
