= Clay Roberts =

American soccer coach

Caleb Roberts
Personal information
- Place of birth: Plant City, Florida, United States
- Position: Defender

College career
Years	Team	Apps	(Gls)
2000–2003	Florida Southern Moccasins		

Senior career*
Years	Team	Apps	(Gls)
2003–2006	Charlotte Eagles		
2005–2009	Philadelphia KiXX (indoor)	67	(1)

Managerial career
- 2008–2010: Philadelphia Biblical Crimson Eagles
- 2014–: Southeastern Fire
- 2016–2023: Florida Tropics SC
- * Club domestic league appearances and goals

Clay Roberts is the head coach of the Southeastern Fire in Lakeland, Florida and a consultant for the Empire Strykers of the Major Arena Soccer League. Roberts has also served as Director of Soccer at VSI Tampa Bay FC, and director of coaching at Brandon FC.

As a player, Roberts attended Florida Southern College. Professionally, he played for the Charlotte Eagles and the Philadelphia KiXX, where he was a part of their 2007 MISL championship.

As a coach and administrator, Roberts has been the vice president of the Ocala Stampede in the PDL, the director of VSI, director of Brandon FC, both women's and men's head coach at Philadelphia Biblical University (now Cairn University), the Buxmont Torch FC of the WPSL, and an assistant at Palm Beach Atlantic University.

In his first year at Southeastern University, Roberts was named the Sun Conference 2015 soccer coach of the year as the team won the school's first-ever conference championship.

Roberts was named the first head coach of the Florida Tropics in the Major Arena Soccer League before the team began play in 2016.

Roberts again won the Sun Conference Coach of the Year award in 2019. Just months later, Roberts was also honored as Coach of the Year for the Major Arena Soccer League, having led the Florida Tropics to their first winning record and an Eastern Conference Championship with an 18–3 record.

Clay's brother, Cheyne, is also a coach, most recently with the USL Championship's Tampa Bay Rowdies.
