= Rochester Lancers (MASL) =

Professional indoor soccer team in Rochester, New York

- Full name: Rochester Lancers
- Nickname: RLancers
- Founded: 2010; 16 years ago
- Dissolved: 2024
- Ground: Total Sports Experience
- Capacity: 500
- Owner: Salvatore "Soccer Sam" Fantauzzo
- Head Coach: Jake Schindler
- League: Major Arena Soccer League 2
- 2023, 2nd place
- Website: https://www.rochesterlancers.com/teams/mens-indoor-lancers
Home colors	Away colors

The Rochester Lancers were a professional indoor soccer team in the Major Arena Soccer League 2. The team is named in honor of the Rochester Lancers of the North American Soccer League. The team was active from November 2011 through March 2015. A new version of the team contested the 2018–19 Major Arena Soccer League 2 season; for 2019–20 the team moved back up to the MASL. After another two year hiatus the Lancers are in M2 for the 2022-23 season. The team concluded play after the 2024 season.

== History ==
In 1995, Salvatore "Soccer Sam" Fantauzzo purchased the Rochester Lancers name and logo as part of his soccer memorabilia collection. In 2010, Fantauzzo started negotiating with commissioner Chris Economides of the USL to be part of the new indoor I-League. The USL struggled to attract teams to the newly formed I-League. At the 2010-2011 MISL Championship game in Baltimore, Fantauzzo convinced MISL commissioner David Grimaldi to meet with the USL and bring the MISL current teams into that organization. The 2011-2012 season saw the new MISL under the USL banner with the four existing MISL teams and the three new I-League teams. Fantauzzo decided to use the Rochester Lancers name and logo for this new indoor MISL team.

Following a merger of the I-League and the third Major Indoor Soccer League, the Lancers played their first game in Syracuse on November 4, 2011, against the Syracuse Silver Knights. Led by team captain and former Rochester Rhinos forward Doug Miller, the first game in the team's history ended in a 16–15 loss and the top scorer was Lubo Kocic who scored 4 goals for the Lancers. The Lancers finished 2nd in the Eastern Division in 2011, qualifying for the playoffs. During the 2011–12 season they, offered a surprise contract to former 76ers player Allen Iverson.

In 2012 assistant coach, Jim Hesch replaced Billy Andracki and became the head coach. Former Cuban International, Rochester Rhino and Rochester Lancers player, Rey 'Boom Boom' Martinez became the assistant coach. The team finished in 5th place in the MISL with a 10-16 record and did not make the playoffs.

The Lancers announced new head coach Josh Rife on September 13, 2013. Josh Rife's assistant coach was Billy Ginther. The team finished in 5th place in the league with a 6-14 record and did not make the playoffs.

After the 2013–2014 season, the team announced that it was leaving the MISL along with five other teams and joining the Premier Arena Soccer League, later was renamed the Major Arena Soccer League. Fantauzzo with Tommy Tanner negotiated hard to keep multi-point scoring in the game of indoor soccer. However, the MASL continued the single point goal system it used as the PASL without 2 & 3 point goals.

On August 2, 2014, team founder and CEO Salvatore Fantauzzo announced that the Lancers would not be playing in the 2014–15 season. Team captain (and Rochester Rhinos legend) Doug Miller intervened and offered to take over management of the team in order to permit the team to preserve its season. Miller later was named coach of the team, though he would continue to play. The team finished in 3rd place in the Eastern Division with a record of 10–10. The team made the playoffs but lost in the division finals to the Baltimore Blast. After the 2014/15 season the team went on a hiatus to hopefully resolve the NYS insurance issues.

In 2017, Soccer Sam licensed his Lancers name & logo to the Rochester River Dogz of the (NPSL). The new Rochester Lancers ownership group included head coach Doug Miller, GM Marc Mandell, Asst GM Nick Mojsovski and CEO Salvatore 'Soccer Sam' Fantauzzo. Weeks later Fantauzzo joined the United Women's Soccer (UWS) and the Lady Lancers were born. Sal Galvano and Loren Inglese handled the team side. Ashley Maria King from the original Lancers handled the business side year one. In 2018, Kayla Klark Kent also from the original Lancers returned to help with the business side. Sal Galvano continued with the team in 2018 as the head coach with Brooke Barbuto as his player/assistant coach.

The Lancers relaunched the indoor team for the 2018–19 season, playing in the Eastern Division of the M2 development league with home games in The Dome Center. The Lancers returned to Division 1 play as they re-joined the MASL for the 2019-20 season, winning only 1 game before competition was halted due to the COVID-19 pandemic. Plans to join the late-starting 2021 MASL season were cancelled in February, partly due to the Dome Center's use as a New York state COVID vaccination site. In 2022, M2 granted the Lancers a waiver of the league's 1,000-seat minimum arena capacity, allowing the team to temporarily take up residence at Total Sports Experience, as the Dome Center had by then abandoned general sports and was in the process of a brief (and ultimately failed) attempt to convert the arena into permanent pickleball court. When the M2 waiver ended, the Dome Center refused to allow the Lancers back (it leased the arena out to a lacrosse club year-round after the failed pickleball experiment), and Blue Cross Arena, the city's major indoor sports arena, had been monopolized by Terry Pegula, who refused to allow any team not owned by him from playing there, while Ritter Arena had too many conflicts with Rochester Institute of Technology. Main Street Armory had been closed indefinitely since 2023. With no viable arena, the Lancers were forced to fold.

== Year-by-year results ==
Year	League	Logo	Reg. season	Playoffs	Avg. attendance
2011–12	MISL		2nd Eastern Division, 11–13	Lost Division Finals	5,675
2012–13	MISL		5th MISL, 10–16	Did not qualify	5,975
2013–14	MISL		5th MISL, 6–14	Did not qualify	7,347
2014–15	MASL		3rd Eastern Division, 10–10	Lost Division Finals	6,539
2015–18	on Hiatus				
2018–19	MASL2		2nd Eastern Division, 8-4	Won Division Finals 3rd in League	2,500
2019-20	MASL		9th Eastern Conference, 1-21	Did not qualify	3,010
2020-22	On Hiatus				
2022-23	MASL2		2nd in North Conference, 8-4	Did not qualify	500
2023-24	MASL2		1st in East Division, 12-0	Lost in the Final	500
Total			66–82	6-7	6,859

== Head coaches ==
- (United States) Bill Andracki (2011–12)
- (United States) Jim Hesch (2012–13)
- (United States) Josh Rife (2013–14)
- (United States) Doug Miller (2014–15; 2018–2020)
- (United States) Jake Schindler (2022–present)

=== 2019–20 roster ===
Note: Flags indicate national team as defined under FIFA eligibility rules; some limited exceptions apply. Players may hold more than one non-FIFA nationality.

No.	Pos.	Nation	Player
00	GK	USA	Brian Wilkin
2	MF	BRA	Rafa Godoi
3	FW	USA	David Wright
4	MF	USA	Gary Boughton
5	MF	USA	Sean Hantes
6	MF	UKR	Bogdan Yatsishin
7	DF	USA	Tim Crawford
9	MF	USA	Daniel Reger
10	FW	ENG	Michael Cunningham
11	DF	USA	Anthony Rozzano
12	FW	USA	Darryl Potter
13	MF	USA	Frankie Ciliberto
14	FW	USA	Alex Harling

No.	Pos.	Nation	Player
16	FW	USA	Andriy Demydiv
17	FW	USA	Peter Dilorenzo
18	MF	USA	Bryan Wolanski
19	FW	USA	Doug Miller
20	DF	BIH	Zikret Osmic
21	MF	USA	Matt D'Amico
22	GK	BRA	Marcelo Moreira
23	MF	USA	Jeremy Ortiz
24	MF	USA	August Finn
25	DF	USA	Jake Reed
27	DF	BRA	Diego Mayanga
31	DF	USA	Jeremy Loncao
35	GK	USA	Christian Esposito

=== 2011–12 roster ===
Note: Flags indicate national team as defined under FIFA eligibility rules; some limited exceptions apply. Players may hold more than one non-FIFA nationality.

No.	Pos.	Nation	Player
0	GK	USA	Leonardo Tillemont
0	GK	BRA	Diego Martins
1	GK	IRL	Gavin McInerney
2	MF	CAN	Josiah Snelgrove
3	DF	USA	Will Kletzien
4	MF	USA	Gary Boughton
5	MF	ECU	Juan Pablo Reyes
6	FW	CHI	Chile Farias
8	DF	USA	Elliot Fauske
9	FW	USA	Andrew Hoxie
10	FW	BRA	Mauricio Salles
12	FW	HAI	Jefferson Dargout

No.	Pos.	Nation	Player
13	FW	SRB	Lubo Kocic
15	DF	USA	Brayton Knapp
17	MF	PER	Nelson Becerra
19	FW	USA	Doug Miller
21	DF	USA	Kyle Manscuk
22	MF	USA	Grady Renfrow
23	MF	USA	Jeremy Ortiz
25	GK	USA	Neal Kitson
25	GK	USA	Patrick Hannigan
26	DF	USA	Jake Schindler
35	DF	CUB	Rey Martinez
80	FW	USA	John Ball

=== 2012–13 roster ===
Note: Flags indicate national team as defined under FIFA eligibility rules; some limited exceptions apply. Players may hold more than one non-FIFA nationality.

No.	Pos.	Nation	Player
0	GK	USA	Marc Sotle
0	GK	TUR	Bora Turgot
1	GK	IRL	Gavin McInerney
2	MF	BRA	Pedrinho Franco
3	FW	USA	Andy Tiedt
4	MF	USA	Gary Boughton
5	DF	USA	Troy Cole
7	FW	GER	Ivory Washington
8	DF	USA	Elliot Fauske
9	FW	USA	Garret Pettis
10	FW	BRA	Mauricio Salles (Captain)
11	DF	USA	Paul Craig
12	FW	HAI	Jefferson Dargout

No.	Pos.	Nation	Player
13	DF	USA	Stephen Basso
15	DF	USA	Brayton Knapp
16	FW	IRL	Danny Earls
17	FW	CRC	Luis Enrique
19	FW	USA	Doug Miller
20	DF	USA	Evan McNeley
21	DF	USA	Kyle Manscuk
23	MF	USA	Jeremy Ortiz
25	GK	USA	Patrick Hannigan
26	DF	USA	Jake Schindler
27	FW	USA	Joey Tavernese
35	DF	CUB	Rey Martinez
77	FW	IRL	Alan McGreal

=== 2013–14 roster ===
Note: Flags indicate national team as defined under FIFA eligibility rules; some limited exceptions apply. Players may hold more than one non-FIFA nationality.

No.	Pos.	Nation	Player
0	GK	USA	Marc Sotile
1	GK	IRL	Gavin McInerney
2	MF	BRA	Pedrinho Franco
3	DF	USA	Sean Summerville
4	MF	USA	Gary Boughton
5	DF	USA	Troy Cole
6	DF	USA	JP Rodrigues
7	MF	GBR	Julian Myers
8	DF	USA	Elliot Fauske
9	FW	USA	Andrew Hoxie
10	FW	BRA	Mauricio Salles (Captain)
11	DF	CAN	Paul Craig
12	FW	HAI	Jefferson Dargout

No.	Pos.	Nation	Player
13	DF	USA	Stephen Basso
14	DF	ANG	Edgar Bartolomeu
15	FW	USA	Josh Faga
17	FW	CRC	Luis Enrique
19	FW	USA	Doug Miller
20	MF	BRA	Juninho Da Silva
23	FW	USA	Marco Terminesi
24	MF	USA	George Morningstar
25	GK	USA	Patrick Hannigan
26	DF	USA	Jake Schindler
27	FW	USA	Joey Tavernese
28	DF	MNE	Bato Radoncic

=== 2014–15 roster ===
Note: Flags indicate national team as defined under FIFA eligibility rules; some limited exceptions apply. Players may hold more than one non-FIFA nationality.

No.	Pos.	Nation	Player
0	GK	USA	Marc Sotile
2	MF	BRA	Pedrinho Franco
3	DF	USA	Roberto Acosta
4	MF	USA	Gary Boughton
5	DF	Isle of Man	Seamus Sharkey
6	DF	USA	Brian Knapp
7	MF	USA	Tim Crawford
8	DF	USA	Elliot Fauske
9	FW	USA	Andrew Hoxie
10	FW	BRA	Mauricio Salles (Captain)
11	DF	USA	Alex Megson
12	FW	HAI	Jefferson Dargout

No.	Pos.	Nation	Player
13	DF	USA	Stephen Basso
14	DF	ANG	Edgar Bartolomeu
15	FW	ECU	Juan Pablo Reyes
17	FW	CRC	Luis Enrique
18	MF	URU	Carlos Munoz
19	FW	USA	Doug Miller
20	MF	USA	Sean Hantes
21	MF	CUB	Yaikel Perez
22	GK	BRA	Marcelo Moreira
23	MF	USA	Jeremy Ortiz
24	MF	USA	George Morningstar
25	GK	USA	Dominic Coco
26	DF	USA	Jake Schindler
27	FW	USA	Joey Tavernese
29	DF	USA	Jayme Kapinos
30	GK	USA	Joey Kapinos
