= Fort Wayne Fever =

Former American soccer team

- Full name: Fort Wayne Fever
- Nickname: Fever
- Founded: 2003
- Dissolved: 2009
- Ground: Hefner Stadium; Fort Wayne, Indiana
- Capacity: 2,000
- League: USL Premier Development League
- 2009: 7th, Great Lakes did not qualify for playoffs
Home colors	Away colors

Fort Wayne Fever was an American soccer team based in Fort Wayne, Indiana, United States. Founded in 2003, the team played in the USL Premier Development League (PDL), the fourth tier of the American Soccer Pyramid, until 2009, after which the franchise folded and the team left the league. The Fever, in 2013, merged in to Citadel Futbol Club into Fort Wayne United

The team played its home games at Hefner Stadium. The team's colors were white and black. The team had a sister organization, Fort Wayne Fever (W-League), which played in the W-League.

== History ==
Fort Wayne Fever entered the USL Premier Development League as an expansion franchise in 2003, having already existed for many years as a successful youth soccer organization in the Fort Wayne area. Playing out of Hefner Stadium, Fever had a rocky start to life in competition: they lost their first ever competitive game 2–0 to state rivals Indiana Invaders, but did pick up a couple of wins in their first encounters, 2–1 over Columbus Shooting Stars and 4–2 on the road at Kalamazoo Kingdom. Fever were competitive throughout most of the rest of the season, especially away from home, where they enjoyed several healthy victories, including a 3–1 win over Columbus in early June, a 3–0 over Toledo Slayers in early July, and a 2–1 over Sioux Falls Spitfire. Two losses and a tie in their final three games – including a 4–0 thrashing at the hands of Michigan Bucks on the last day of the season – put paid to any playoff hopes Fever may have had; they finished their debut year a close third in the Great Lakes Division, just six points behind Indiana.

2004 was a great season for Fort Wayne, who built on their excellent debut year and were genuine challengers for their divisional title. They started the season with bang, flattening Kalamazoo Kingdom 5–2 on the opening day of the season, and registering several other high-scoring wins, 3–2 over Toledo Slayers and 4–3 over Cleveland Internationals, the latter of which saw striker Omar Jarun winning it for Fever with a 109th minute golden goal. Fort Wayne were unstoppable in June, winning six games out of six, and outscoring their opponents 24 to 6. They demolished Indiana Blast 7–3 off a hat trick from Daniel Broxup, and overwhelmed West Michigan Edge 6–1 with Broxup's second trio of the year. As the season entered its final month Fever looked poised to take their first divisional title, but inexplicably folded in the run-in, losing two of their final four regular season games, including a 1–5 humiliation at home to Michigan Bucks. Despite beating Indiana Invaders 4–3 on the final day of the season, they eventually finished the year in second place in the Great Lakes Division, just one point behind champs Michigan Bucks, but into the playoffs for the first time. Sadly for Fever, their playoff campaign was a short one, as they lost 3–1 to Heartland Division champions Chicago Fire Premier first time out; nevertheless, Fever's achievements for the year were admirable. Daniel Broxup was a monster in front of goal, netting an astonishing 19 times, making him the 5th highest scorer in the PDL in 2004, while Josh Tudela and Philip Wilson both provided 5 assists each.

Fever began 2005 continuing the form with which they had ended 2004; a 5–2 opening day victory over Toledo Slayers (courtesy of four goals from Daniel Broxup) was immediately followed by a 3–1 win on the road over Kalamazoo Kingdom, and Fort Wayne looked poised to challenge for honors again. However, and for reasons unclear, things never quite came together for the team. Throughout the year, Fever's form was either feast or famine: every game was either a one-sided blowout victory, or a demoralizing heavy defeat. Kyle Dulworth scored an 88th-minute winner in their 4–3 victory over Kalamazoo in early June, they outscored Thunder Bay Chill 9–2 in their three games in late June and early July and absolutely flattened West Michigan Edge 6–1 in the penultimate game of the season. However, they were annihilated 7–0 at home Michigan Bucks in mid-June, and also suffered a desperate four-game losing streak in July, losing 5–1 to Thunder Bay, 4–0 to West Michigan, and 3–1 to Chicago Fire Premier in quick succession. The 5–0 defeat to Indiana Invaders on the final day of the season ended the campaign on a low note; they finished the year fourth in the Great Lakes Division, a full 22 points behind division champs Chicago Fire Premier, and out of the playoffs. Daniel Broxup was again Fort Wayne's top scorer, albeit with just 7 goals on the season, while Kyle Dulworth contributed 4 assists.

Fort Wayne's form took a calamitous turn in 2006; they won just one game all season long – 2–0 over Cleveland Internationals in early June off a brace from Lance Muckey – and lost or tied their other 15 encounters, and only finished out of the Great Lakes Division basement by virtue of the fact that they tied more games than the equally abysmal Cleveland Internationals. To Fever's credit, most of their losses were tight affairs, usually one goal decisions, often as a result of conceding heartbreaking late winners. In the most extreme examples, West Michigan Edge scored a 90th-minute goal to win 2–1 on the opening day of the season, and then came from a goal down to win 3–2 in their second encounter in June, and they even let a 3-goal lead slip in their 3–3 tie with the Michigan Bucks. It was all quite frustrating for the Fever fans, who were not used to seeing their team suffer this badly. Philip Wilson was Fort Wayne's top scorer, with 8 goals; John Michael Hayden and John Mellencamp registered 2 assists apiece.

Things got slightly better for Fever in 2007, as they improved to a 4–11–1 record, but still finished rock bottom of the Great Lakes Division, mainly as a result of the improved form of rivals Cleveland Internationals. Three of their four victories came in the early part of the season, and included a battling 3–2 victory over West Michigan Edge and two wins over Cleveland, the second of which saw Fever fight back from a goal down to register another 3–2 result. Unfortunately, elsewhere, Fort Wayne suffered: as was the case before, Fever at least kept the majority of the scorelines respectable, only losing spectacularly once, 5–0 away at Chicago Fire Premier. Everything else was tight – they let a 2-goal lead slip to lose 3–2 to West Michigan in mid-June, and dropped a tight 1–0 decision at home to new boys St. Louis Lions, although they did come back from 3–1 down to tie 3–3 with Cleveland on July 1 thanks to late goals from Philip Wilson and Harrison Heller, their only tie of the season. Their only other victory of the season came in mid-July against Toronto Lynx, a bad-tempered game which saw both sides reduced to 10 men, but where Fort Wayne held on take a 3–2 win. Their top scorer, yet again, was the reliable Philip Wilson, with 5 goals, while Gary Boughton contributed 3 assists.

Fort Wayne moved to the Midwest Division following the 2008 PDL divisional re-alignment, but remained disappointingly uncompetitive, slumping to a 2–9–5 record, and finishing fourth of five in the division, 18 points behind champs Chicago Fire Premier. Ironically, one of Fever's two wins was against Chicago, a 1–0 decision away off a goal from Gary Boughton. Sadly, this was about as good as it got for Fever; they leaked goals everywhere else they went, losing 5–0 to Michigan Bucks, 4–1 to Toronto Lynx, and losing 2–1 in three consecutive games at home to Chicago, new boys Kalamazoo Outrage, and the resurgent Cleveland Internationals, who scored an 87th-minute winner to snatch victory from the jaws of defeat. Fever's only other win of the season was actually a pretty comprehensive 4–1 revenge victory over Toronto Lynx in which Gary Boughton scored a hat trick, but they reverted to form quickly thereafter. The 5–0 loss to West Virginia Chaos in the penultimate game was perhaps the season's nadir; Boughton was Fort Wayne's top scorer with 6 goals.

In spring 2013, Fever merged into Cidadel Futbol Club to create the new Fort Wayne United Soccer Club.

== Year-by-year ==
Year	Division	League	Regular season	Playoffs	Open Cup
2003	4	USL PDL	3rd, Great Lakes	Did not qualify	Did not qualify
2004	4	USL PDL	2nd, Great Lakes	Conference Semifinals	Did not qualify
2005	4	USL PDL	4th, Great Lakes	Did not qualify	Did not qualify
2006	4	USL PDL	6th, Great Lakes	Did not qualify	Did not qualify
2007	4	USL PDL	7th, Great Lakes	Did not qualify	Did not qualify
2008	4	USL PDL	4th, Midwest	Did not qualify	Did not qualify
2009	4	USL PDL	7th, Great Lakes	Did not qualify	Did not qualify

== Head coaches ==
- (United States) Bobby Poursanidis (2005–2009)

== Stadia ==
- Hefner Stadium; Fort Wayne, Indiana (2003–2009)

== Average attendance ==
Attendance stats are calculated by averaging each team's self-reported home attendances from the historical match archive at https://web.archive.org/web/20100105175057/http://www.uslsoccer.com/history/index_E.html and Kenn.com https://kenn.com/blog/soccer/all-time-usl-league-two-attendance/.

- 2003: 686 (11th in PDL)
- 2004: 565 (13th in PDL) Playoffs: 690 Overall: 579
- 2005: 415 (19th in PDL)
- 2006: 257 (39th in PDL)
- 2007: 298 (35th in PDL)
- 2008: 456 (21st in PDL)
- 2009: 977 (10th in PDL)

== See also ==
- History of sports in Fort Wayne, Indiana
