= Chicago Fire U-23 =

American soccer team

- Full name: Chicago Fire Premier
- Nickname: CFP
- Founded: 2001
- Dissolved: 2016
- Ground: Toyota Park; Bridgeview, Illinois
- Capacity: 20,000
- League: Premier Development League
- 2016: 3rd, Heartland Division; Playoffs: DNQ
- Website: http://www.chicago-fire.com/academy/PDL
Home colors	Away colors

Original Chicago Fire Reserves logo

Chicago Fire U-23 was an American soccer team based in Chicago, Illinois, United States. Founded in 2001, the team last played in the PDL, the fourth tier of the American Soccer Pyramid. They last played in 2016, choosing to leave the PDL.

The team played its home games at the artificial turf practice field adjacent to Toyota Park in Bridgeview, Illinois. The team's colors were red and white.

Until 2005 they were known as the Chicago Fire Reserves. In 2006, they were renamed Chicago Fire Premier. From the 2008 season, the team was usually referred to as Chicago Fire PDL, although the official name of the team did not change.

== History ==
Chicago Fire Reserves entered the PDL in 2001 as part of an effort on the part of MLS franchise Chicago Fire to develop and enhance the level of youth soccer in the Chicago area. Playing under the auspices of a professional club gave the Fire an advantage in terms of organization and player talent identification, which has led to them becoming one of the most successful teams in the PDL, winning their divisional title on all but one occasion, in the club's first 8 years, and having many of their players graduate on to the biggest of soccer stages.

The team's first season was a winning one, as they took the Great Lakes Division with a 15–1–4 record, ten points clear of second place West Michigan Edge, and into the playoffs at the first time of asking. Their opponent in the semi-final was Mid-South Division champs Texas Spurs who they beat 1–0; unfortunately for the Fire, they lost the Central Conference championship game to Heartland Division champions Sioux Falls Spitfire (who went on to finish third in the national playoffs), but is still marked an excellent debut for the team – so much so that head coach Bret Hall was named PDL Coach of the Year in the end of season awards. The Class of 2001 also featured future international stars Jay DeMerit and Gavin Glinton.

2002 was much of the same for the Fire. Despite moving to the Great Lakes Division they took the title easily, with a 14–3–1 record, 9 points clear of second place Mid-Michigan Bucks and into the playoffs once more. However, somewhat surprisingly, they lost their Conference Semifinal to Heartland Division runners-up Boulder Rapids Reserve, who would go on to reach the Championship Game. Despite this unexpected loss, Chicago remained a force to be reckoned with in the Central Conference, as evidenced by the fact that goalkeeper Matt Pickens and defender Denny Clanton were named the 'Best of the Year' for their respective positions by the PDL.

Chicago's 2003 campaign was the most successful in their history to date; despite losing their opening salvo 2–0 away at Des Moines Menace, the Fire recovered to rattle off eight consecutive wins in their next eight games, including a 5–0 drubbing of Sioux Falls Spitfire that featured a Robert Mouw hat trick, three 4-goal victories over St. Louis, Thunder Bay and Kansas, and a four-game streak in mid June where they did not concede a single goal. A hard-fought game against the St. Louis Strikers ended with a 4–3 loss for Chicago, but this was their only stutter in the latter part of the regular season, which saw them end with a 10-game unbeaten streak. Fire annihilated the Wisconsin Rebels 10–0 in the penultimate regular season game, with goals from future pros Chris Rolfe and Ryan Miller amongst others, and wrapped up their third consecutive divisional title with a 4–0 victory away in Wisconsin. The playoffs were hosted by the Michigan Bucks, and Fire progressed in impressive form with an 8–0 demolition of Indiana Invaders in the semi-final that saw Patrick Grange, Jamal Sutton and Kirk Harwat each grab two goals each. Fire overcame hosts Michigan 2–0 in the Central Conference final to progress to the national final four; they beat Western Conference champions Orange County Blue Star 3–1 with goals from Jamal Sutton and Chris Rolfe to progress to their first PDL Championship Game. Their opponents in the final were the Cape Cod Crusaders, who scored a goal in each half to take the title 2–0.

Chicago continued to dominate in 2004, winning the Heartland Division with a 17–0–1 record, scoring 73 goals while conceding just 7 all season long, and ending the regular season campaign with the best record in the entire PDL. Chicago were simply unstoppable all season long: they scored 32 goals without reply in the month of May, overwhelming Wisconsin Rebels 8–0, flattening Sioux Falls Spitfire 9–0 with three goals from Patrick Grange and braces from both James Klatter and Hamid Mehreioskouei, and putting five goals past Indiana Blast. Fire didn't concede their first goal until the seventh game of the season (a 3–1 win over the Michigan Bucks), but their exquisite form in front of goal continued unabated: five goals against Kansas City Brass, six on the road over St. Louis Strikers, and another five against the hapless Wisconsin Rebels were the June highlights, with Nowaf Jaman hitting four goals in the Kansas game, and Thabiso Khumalo netting a hat trick against St. Louis. Chicago's amazing form gave their first ever berth in the US Open Cup; they flattened Illinois-based USASA side S.A.C. Wisla 5–1 in their first round tie, with two of the goals being scored by Julian Nash, and even more impressively overcame PSL stalwarts New Hampshire Phantoms by the same scoreline in the second round, despite the game being Chicago's first ever match against professional opposition. Fire's fairytale run ended in the third round with a 1–0 defeat at the hands of A-League side Rochester Raging Rhinos, but their efforts still illustrated the strength of the team. Back in league play, Chicago's only dropped points came in the game against Kalamazoo Kingdom, which finished 0–0, but as the season wound down Fire still punished their luckless opponents: young Bosnian striker Vedad Ibišević scored twice in their 4–1 win over Wisconsin, and Khumalo scored another two in the 5–0 win over Indiana Invaders which secured the divisional title. Fort Wayne Fever hosted the Central Conference playoffs, and Chicago overcame the hosts 3–1 in the semi-final, to set up a decider with the Boulder Rapids Reserve in the conference championship. However, after a 0–0 tie in regulation time, Boulder midfielder John Pulido scored a 98th minute golden goal to send the Colorado team the national final four, and send the Fire home disappointed. The 2004 Fire team was awash with future stars: in addition to top scorers Nowaf Jaman and Julian Nash, who scored 12 goals each, players such as Drew Moor, Dasan Robinson, Chris Rolfe all featured for the team, while goalkeeper Brad Guzan posted the best GK stats in the PDL – 0.388 goals against – before turning pro with Chivas USA.

Fire moved back to the Great Lakes division in 2005, but still ran away with their fifth divisional title in five years, enjoying a superb 14–1–1 record, nine points clear of second-placed Michigan Bucks. Their single defeat was a 3–2 loss against Indiana Invaders in a bad-tempered match which saw Fire coach Mike Matkovich and Indiana striker Leonardo Peirano-Pardeiro both sent off; however, the rest of the season was comparative plain sailing for Chicago, despite the team having no permanent home, instead traveling all around southern Illinois in search of a stadium to play in. The regular season highlights included a 4–0 thrashing of Fort Wayne Fever in late May which features a brace from striker Kyle Brown, a 4–0 win over 10-man Thunder Bay Chill in mid-June off two more Brown goals, and a 6–0 demolition of Toledo Slayers in July with two goals from super-sub Hamid Mehreioskouei. Chicago returned to the US Open Cup for the second time in 2005, and enjoyed another taste of success amongst the big boys, beating local USASA team AAC Eagles 4–1 in the first round, and pushed USL First Division powerhouse Minnesota Thunder all the way in the second round before being narrowly defeated 2–1 off a heartbreaking late own goal. Fire's trip to the playoffs was yet again a frustrating one, as the #1 seeds fell 4–0 to Heartland Division runners-up Des Moines Menace in the conference semi-final. Dave Leung was Fire's top scorer, with 8 goals (closely followed by Brown and Mehreioskouei with 6 each), while Leung, John DiRaimondo and John Michael Hayden all contributed 3 assists.

The team changed its name to Chicago Fire Premier in 2006, and made it six for six in league play, taking Great Lakes Division once more with an impressive 14–2–0 regular season record, 12 points clear of perennial bridesmaids, Michigan Bucks. Chicago actually lost their second game of the season, 2–0 at home to Kalamazoo Kingdom but recovered quickly to rattle off eleven consecutive victories over the next two months. Striker Ryan Anderson scored a hat trick in the 4–0 win over Indiana Invaders in late May, and then held on to take a 4–3 victory in the see-sawing return fixture in South Bend in June. The 5–0 win over Cleveland Internationals on July 1 was the most comprehensive victory of the season and again featured goals from Ryan Anderson, and despite being unexpectedly dropped 3–1 by West Michigan Edge on the road, had already clinched their division by the time they walloped Thunder Bay Chill on the final day of the regular season. The Central Conference playoff semi-final against Des Moines Menace was a classic: 1–1 at the end of regular time, and with a man advantage following Danilo Oliveira's red card, Chicago scored twice in extra time to be 3–1 ahead with just nine minutes to play, only to see Des Moines come back and score twice to take the game to penalties. Chicago keeper Evan Bush saved from Alexander Munns in the shootout, and the rest of the team kept their heads to win the shootout 5–3. However the exertions of the day took its toll on the team, when they lost the Conference final by a comprehensive 4–1 scoreline to the Michigan Bucks. Ryan Anderson was Chicago's top scorer, with 11 goals; Siniša Ubiparipović and Cesar Zambrano led the assists stats with 3.

The 2007 season was the first blip in the history books for Chicago, as they narrowly failed to win their division, instead finishing second to the Michigan Bucks. Chicago actually started the season with a wobble, tying Indiana Invaders 1–1 in their first game, beating Fort Wayne Fever and West Michigan Edge, but then tying 2–2 with league new boys Toronto Lynx, and suffering a 4–0 loss at the hands of Michigan Bucks, the team's worst result in many years. Fire were still victorious more often than not, but somehow seemed to lose the sheen of invincibility that had followed them for more than half a decade: Cleveland Internationals pushed them all the way in their 2–1 win in Ohio, Toronto and West Michigan held on for a pair of 0–0 ties, and Indiana stole all three points in their game in South Bend, holding on for a 2–1 victory. Fire's biggest win of the season was the 5–0 hammering of Fort Wayne Fever in mid-June that featured a brace from substitute striker Strider Elass, but they were already too far behind Michigan to catch them on the run-in, and were lucky not to be caught at the post themselves with two more losses in July, including a 2–0 final day defeat to Cleveland. Chicago overcame Thunder Bay Chill 3–1 in the Central Conference playoff semi-final with two late goals from Braden Fleak, but yet again were unable to make that final step onto the national stage, losing 3–0 to Michigan in the Conference final. Strider Elass was Chicago's top scorer with 5 goals, while David Roth contributed 4 assists.

Normal service was resumed in 2008, with Chicago reclaiming their divisional title – the 7th in 8 years – ahead of Kalamazoo Outrage with an 8–2–6 record. The season started well for Fire, who rattled off five wins in their first six games, including a comprehensive 3–0 win on the road against new boys Kalamazoo. Ties became Chicago's problem during the mid-seasons stretch: they were forced to endure four of them in five games during June, although the 2–2 tie with West Virginia Chaos was more a relief, as they had been 2 goals down with less than 20 minutes to play. Midfielder Michael Ferguson scored twice in their hard-fought 3–2 win over the Cincinnati Kings in July, and they enjoyed the best result of the season with their 6–0 hammering of West Michigan Edge on the final weekend – a game which saw all six Fire goals scored by different players. Chicago lost 2–0 to Kalamazoo in the playoff divisional round, a result which, for the fifth consecutive year, saw a superb regular season end with a disappointing playoff campaign. Michael Ferguson and Carlos França were Chicago's top performers, with 4 goals and 3 assists each.

Fire started the 2009 season superbly, winning four of their first five games, including three back-to-back road victories over Cleveland, Fort Wayne and Toronto, and qualifying for the U.S. Open Cup. Their cup run was brief but satisfying, beating the National Premier Soccer League's Milwaukee Bavarians before falling to the professional Minnesota Thunder 4–0 in the second round. Chicago's biggest rival throughout the season was Kalamazoo Outrage, who handed Chicago their only defeat of the regular season, a 2–1 loss at home in early June. Elsewhere, however, Chicago were virtually flawless; they outclassed the Michigan Bucks 3–0 in early July, put five past the Cincinnati Kings, and ended Forest City London's hopes of a divisional title with a 3–1 win in mid-July. They finished the year in second place in the Great Lakes division, and began the playoffs by defeating London for a second time in the first round. Subsequent victories over Kalamazoo and the Ocean City Barons gave Chicago a second Conference title; they overcame the Cary Clarets 2–1 in extra time in a bad-tempered semi-final in which two players and two coaches were red carded, and travelled to California for the PDL Championship game against Ventura County Fusion. Despite having a numerical advantage for more than an hour, Chicago were beaten by an injury time goal from Ventura's Alfonso Motagalvan, and had to be content with the runners up spot. Andre Akpan was the team's top scorer, with seven goals, while Rich Balchan contributed three assists. Goalkeeper Jimmy Maurer was also voted the PDL Goalkeeper of the Year.

The club folded at the end of the 2016 season. A new club, Chicago FC United, replaced them for the 2017 season, with several of the staff from the Chicago Fire PDL club moving to the new club.

== Players ==
=== Notable former players ===
This list of notable former players comprises players who went on to play professional soccer after playing for the team in the Premier Development League, or those who previously played professionally before joining the team.

- (United States) Andre Akpan
- (United States) Rich Balchan
- (United States) J. C. Banks
- (United States) Brandon Barklage
- (United States) Austin Berry
- (United States) Matt Bobo
- (United States) Freddie Braun
- (United States) Kyle Brown
- (El Salvador) Efrain Burgos, Jr.
- (United States) Ray Burse
- (United States) Evan Bush
- (United States) Denny Clanton
- (United States) Jay DeMerit
- (United States) John DiRaimondo
- (United States) Tighe Dombrowski
- (United States) Chris Estridge
- (United States) Ethan Finlay
- (Turks and Caicos Islands) Gavin Glinton
- (United States) Ned Grabavoy
- (United States) Brad Guzan
- (United States) John Michael Hayden
- (Bosnia and Herzegovina) Vedad Ibišević
- (Palestine) Omar Jarun
- (Croatia) Nikola Katic
- (South Africa) Thabiso Khumalo
- (United States) Perry Kitchen
- (United States) C. J. Klaas
- (New Zealand) Cameron Knowles
- (United States) Luke Kreamalmeyer
- (United States) Ross LaBauex
- (United States) Eric Lichaj
- (United States) J. C. Mack
- (United States) Peri Marošević
- (United States) Aaron Maund
- (United States) Rauwshan McKenzie
- (Haiti) Pascal Milien
- (United States) Drew Moor
- (United States) Justin Morrow
- (United States) Brandon Moss
- (United States) Julian Nash
- (United States) Brad North
- (United States) Eduardo Orozco
- (United States) Lance Parker
- (United States) Matt Pickens
- (United States) Brian Plotkin
- (United States) Tyler Polak
- (United States) Zach Prince
- (United States) Matt Pyzdrowski
- (United States) Tim Ream
- (United States) Tim Regan
- (United States) Barry Rice
- (United States) Brad Ring
- (United States) Dasan Robinson
- (United States) Chris Rolfe
- (United States) David Roth
- (United States) Harry Shipp
- (United States) Seth Sinovic
- (United States) Jonathan Spector
- (United States) Michael Stephens
- (United States) Jamal Sutton
- (Bosnia and Herzegovina) Siniša Ubiparipović
- (United States) Kirk Urso
- (United States) Lance Watson
- (United States) Cesar Zambrano
- (United States) Jed Zayner
- (United States) Steve Reuter

== Year-by-year ==
Year	Division	League	Regular season	Playoffs	Open Cup
2001	4	USL PDL	1st, Great Lakes	Conference Finals	did not qualify
2002	4	USL PDL	1st, Great Lakes	Conference Semifinals	did not qualify
2003	4	USL PDL	1st, Heartland	National Final	did not qualify
2004	4	USL PDL	1st, Heartland	Conference Finals	3rd round
2005	4	USL PDL	1st, Great Lakes	Conference Semifinals	2nd round
2006	4	USL PDL	1st, Great Lakes	Conference Finals	did not qualify
2007	4	USL PDL	2nd, Great Lakes	Conference Finals	did not qualify
2008	4	USL PDL	1st, Midwest	Divisional Round	did not qualify
2009	4	USL PDL	2nd, Great Lakes	National Final	2nd round
2010	4	USL PDL	4th, Great Lakes	did not qualify	did not qualify
2011	4	USL PDL	2nd, Great Lakes	Conference Semifinals	1st round
2012	4	USL PDL	5th, Great Lakes	did not qualify	did not qualify
2013	4	USL PDL	3rd, Great Lakes	Divisional Playoffs	did not qualify
2014	4	USL PDL	3rd, Great Lakes	did not qualify	did not qualify
2015	4	USL PDL	3rd, Great Lakes	did not qualify	did not qualify
2016	4	USL PDL	3rd, Heartland	did not qualify	did not qualify

== Honors ==
Division Championships (7):

- USL PDL Great Lakes Division Champion (4): 2001, 2002, 2005, 2006
- USL PDL Heartland Division Champion (2): 2003, 2004
- USL PDL Midwest Division Champion: 2008

Other:

- USL PDL Central Conference Champion (2): 2003, 2009
- USL PDL Regular Season Champion: 2004
- Hank Steinbrecher Cup: 2016

== Head coaches ==
- (United States) Bret Hall (2001)
- (United States) Mike Matkovich (2002–2006)
- (United States) Larry Sunderland (2007–2010)
- (England) Mark Spooner (2011–2013)
- (United States) Mike Matkovich (2014)
- (United States) Brian Bliss (2015)
- (United States) Logan Pause (2016)

== Stadiums ==
- Stadium at Lemont High School; Lemont, Illinois 23 games (2003–2007)
- Stadium at St. Laurence High School; Burbank, Illinois 1 game (2003)
- Stadium at Watseka Community High School; Watseka, Illinois 2 games (2003–2004)
- Stadium at Pontiac Township High School; Pontiac, Illinois 3 games (2003)
- Stadium at St. Rita of Cascia High School; Chicago, Illinois 2 games (2004–2005)
- Loyola University Soccer Park; Chicago, Illinois 2 games (2004–2005)
- Stadium at Eisenhower High School; Decatur, Illinois 2 games (2004)
- Stadium at Moraine Valley Community College; Palos Hills, Illinois 2 games (2005)
- Toyota Park; Bridgeview, Illinois 12 games (2007–2010)
- Stadium at Marist High School; Chicago, Illinois 1 game (2007)
- Campton Hills Park; St. Charles, Illinois 1 game (2007)
- Stadium at Argo Community High School; Summit, Illinois 1 game (2009)
- Loyola University Soccer Park; Chicago, Illinois 1 game (2009)
- Stadium at Benedictine University; Lisle, Illinois 1 game (2009)
- Stadium at Evanston Township High School; Evanston, Illinois (2011–2016)

== Average attendance ==
Attendance stats are calculated by averaging each team's self-reported home attendances from the historical match archive at https://web.archive.org/web/20100105175057/http://www.uslsoccer.com/history/index_E.html

- 2005: 266
- 2006: 1,816
- 2007: 169
- 2008: 82
- 2009: 87
- 2010: 53

== Super-20 team ==
The Fire Premier, in its affiliation with the MLS Chicago Fire, became a member of the USL Super-20 league in 2007. Continuing with the program's successful tradition, the team qualified for the North American Finals with an undefeated regular season record in 2007. The team moved all the way through to the North American Championship defeating MLS player development teams from D.C. United and New York Red Bulls on the way, before falling in the North American Championship to the Player Development Academy of New Jersey, by a score of 3–1. Larry Sunderland was named Coach of the Year for the Super-20 division and players Chris Schuler (Creighton University) and Braden Fleak (Wright St. University) were named to the Super-20 All League team.

On August 3, 2008, the Chicago Fire Super-20 team became the first MLS player development team to win a league championship by becoming the North American Super 20 champions after defeating Toronto 2–1 in the Super-20 Final. The win capped a dominating finals competition in which the Fire went 5–0 and outscored the other conference qualifiers by an aggregate score of 17–2, including a 3–0 win over the DC United player development team in the semifinals. The Fire qualified for the North American Finals after finishing on top of the Midwest Conference with a record of 10–1–0. The Fire finished the season with a 15-game winning streak and a final record of 15–1–0. Their two-year record of 23–2–3 is the best in North America in the Super 20 division. The team was led by captains and Super 20 League Co-MVP's Robert Younger (Illinois-Chicago) and Mark Blades (Northwestern). Mike Stephens (UCLA) and Chris Cutshaw (Bradley) were named to the All-finals team and Matt Eliason (Northwestern) won the Golden Boot award as the leading scorer in the North American Finals with 6 goals in 5 matches, including the game winner in the 81st minute of the Championship match against Toronto.
