= Patrick Hannigan =

American soccer player (born 1982)

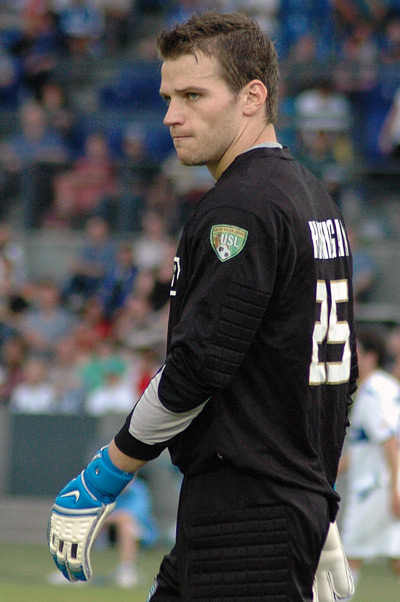

Personal information
- Date of birth: October 23, 1982 (age 44)
- Place of birth: Philadelphia, Pennsylvania, United States
- Height: 6 ft 3 in (1.91 m)
- Position: Goalkeeper

Youth career
- 2001–2004: Temple Owls

Senior career*
Years	Team	Apps	(Gls)
2004	Ocean City Barons	10	(0)
2005	Bray Wanderers		
2006	Rochester Raging Rhinos	0	(0)
2007	Miami FC	22	(0)
2008	New Jersey Ironmen (indoor)		
2009	Miami FC	23	(0)
2011	Ocean City Nor'easters	5	(0)
2011	Rochester Lancers (indoor)	20	(0)
2012–	San Antonio Scorpions	3	(0)
- * Club domestic league appearances and goals as of October 4, 2012

Patrick Hannigan (born October 23, 1982, in Philadelphia, Pennsylvania) is an American soccer player currently without a club. He previously played for the Rochester Lancers in the MISL (winter league) and San Antonio Scorpions of the North American Soccer League (spring/fall).

== Career ==
=== College and amateur ===
Hannigan attended Frankford High School and played college soccer at Temple University, where he was a two-time A-10 Defensive Player of the Year, a PSS Player of the Year, and an Academic All-Atlantic 10 Conference pick in 2003.

During his college years Hannigan also played with the Ocean City Barons in the USL Premier Development League. During the 2004 season, he played in 10 games, splitting time with Ryan Carr, and helping the club achieve a rare undefeated season. Hannigan was 7-0-3 as a starter earning five shutouts and remains the club's single-season record holder for goals against average (0.56) and saves (75). He also set the club record for saves in a game when he made 18 stops in a 3–1 win against the Reading Rage on July 17, 2004.

He also started both games for the Barons in the 2004 Lamar Hunt U.S. Open Cup, a 5–0 win over the USASA's Allied SC in the opening round and a 4–2 loss to the A-League's Syracuse Salty Dogs in Round 2.

=== Professional ===
Hannigan was drafted by the MetroStars with sixth pick of the third round of the 2005 MLS Supplemental Draft, but was not offered a contract by the team, and instead signed with Irish side Bray Wanderers of the League of Ireland.

He returned to the United States in 2006 to play for the Rochester Raging Rhinos in 2006, but never saw any first-team action, and moved on to Miami FC in 2007. He was Miami's first-choice goalkeeper throughout the 2007, playing 22 games for the team.

After a year playing indoor soccer with the New Jersey Ironmen in 2008, Hannigan returned to Miami in April, 2009, and played 23 games for the team in the USL First Division before being released at the end of the season.

After a year out of the game in 2010, Hannigan signed to play with the Ocean City Nor'easters in the USL Premier Development League in 2011.

On November 19, 2011, the Rochester Lancers announced they have signed Hannigan to their squad. He was released for disciplinary reasons in January 2014.

Hannigan signed in January 2012 with expansion side San Antonio Scorpions of the North American Soccer League. Hannigan began the 2013 NASL season as the number one keeper for San Antonio Scorpions. He was not re-signed for the 2014 season.
