= Ward Forrest =

American soccer player

Personal information
- Place of birth: Seattle, Washington, U.S.
- Position: Forward

Youth career
- 1972–1975: Washington Huskies

Senior career*
Years	Team	Apps	(Gls)
1977–1978	Seattle Sounders	4	(0)
- * Club domestic league appearances and goals

Ward Forrest is an American retired soccer forward who spent two seasons in the North American Soccer League.

Forrest attended the University of Washington where he played on the Huskies soccer team from 1972 to 1975. He then played for the Seattle Sounders of the North American Soccer League in 1977 and 1978. His son Kevin Forrest also played for the Washington Huskies and for the Seattle Sounders.
