= Hefner Soccer Complex =

Group of soccer fields in Fort Wayne, Indiana, US

Coordinates: 41°7′10″N 85°6′57″W

Hefner Soccer Complex (also known as Hefner Stadium, and Hefner Fields) is a large group of soccer fields located in Fort Wayne, Indiana. It is named after David J. Hefner, the late son of William J. and Bonnie L. Hefner, local philanthropists.

The complex consists of 14 fields highlighted by a 2,000-seat stadium. The complex is used by Purdue University Fort Wayne soccer teams, known as the Purdue Fort Wayne Mastodons, and the Fort Wayne Fever of the USL Premier Development League.

== Events ==
National Soccer Festival is staged at the complex, celebrating the sport of soccer on the collegiate level, with such activities as golf outings, live entertainment, and food vendors. In 2008, 12 universities participated in the event.

== Tenants ==
The complex is mainly occupied by the Fort Wayne Fever. The Plex indoor soccer building adjacent is also occupied by the Fort Wayne Fever.
