= Laurent Manuel =

American/French soccer player (born 1986)

Personal information
- Full name: Laurent Manuel
- Date of birth: April 27, 1986 (age 40)
- Place of birth: New York, United States
- Height: 5 ft 9 in (1.75 m)
- Positions: Defender; midfielder

Youth career
- 2004: Marseille

College career
Years	Team	Apps	(Gls)
2004–2008	Brown Bears		

Senior career*
Years	Team	Apps	(Gls)
2009	K.V. Oostende		
2010	Long Island Rough Riders		
2010	Sevilla FC Puerto Rico		
- * Club domestic league appearances and goals as of January 8, 2012

Laurent Manuel (born April 27, 1986) is a former Franco-American soccer player, investor, entrepreneur, and producer.

== Career ==
=== Youth and college ===
Manuel was a member of the youth academy at famed French club Olympique de Marseille, before playing four years of college soccer at Brown University. Prior to that he played for his Manhattan prep school, The Browning School.

=== Professional ===
In December 2007, Manuel trialed with Israeli club, Hapoel Tel Aviv. The trial was positive and he was asked to return later that year.

Manuel was then selected in the fourth round of the 2008 MLS Supplemental Draft by New York Red Bulls, but did not sign with the club, instead opting to rejoin Hapoel Tel Aviv to try to restart his professional career aboard. He was initially offered a contract by Hapoel Tel Aviv, but he couldn't stay due to paperwork problems. He later returned to the United States where he was called in by D.C. United, and played several reserve games against Chicago Fire, New England Revolution and Columbus Crew.

Manuel trained with Maccabi Tel Aviv in July 2008, after rejecting an offer from Maccabi Herzliya; Maccabi were eager to find another player who could play at right or left back due to the failed transfer of Sjaak Polak. After leaving Maccabi Tel Aviv. Manuel went on trial at Portsmouth in England under Harry Redknapp.

He later returned to train with Portsmouth under Paul Hart. On September 1, 2009, he signed with Belgian side K.V. Oostende

Manuel made his league debut with Oostende on September 11, 2009, in a match against K.S.K. Beveren, and went on to play three first team games with the team.

After leaving Oostende, Manuel went on trial with Croatian club RNK Split, and was initially offered a contract, but it fell through when there was complications concerning the president of the club. After further trials in Europe with Swedish club AIK, Manuel returned to the United States in 2010, and re-joined the Long Island Rough Riders for the 2010 PDL campaign.

Manuel has recently just signed for Sevilla FC Puerto Rico to partake in the Supercopa Direct TV 2010. He captained the team and lead them to qualify for the 2011 CFU Club Championship. The SuperCopa is this year's qualifying tournament for the Puerto Rico spots at the 2011 CFU Club Championship Club championship for Caribbean, which in turn is the qualifying tournament for the 2011-12 CONCACAF Champions League (CCL). In 2008 Sevilla FC Puerto Rico were affiliated with Sevilla FC of La Liga, one of the leading clubs of Spain.

=== Post-Professional Career ===
Laurent served on the board of directors for LOSC Football Club in Ligue 1 from 2018-'21. During his time with the club the team participated in Champions League, Europa League and won the 2020-'21 French Ligue 1 Uber Eats Championship.
