= Rochester Lancers (2015) =

- Full name: Rochester Lancers
- Nickname: RLancers
- Short name: Lancers
- Founded: 2015; 11 years ago
- Stadium: Wegmans Stadium, Rochester, New York
- Owner: Salvatore "SoccerSam" Fantauzzo
- Coach: Jake Schindler; Mark Mandell
- League: UPSL
- 2017: 3rd, Great Lakes East
- Website: www.rochesterlancers.com
Home colors	Away colors

The Rochester Lancers (formerly known as Rochester River Dogz FC) are an American soccer team based in Rochester, New York. Founded as the Rochester River Dogz in 2015, the team rebranded as the Rochester Lancers in April 2017. The team play its home games at the Aquinas Institute's Wegmans Stadium.

Their name comes from the original Lancers who played from 1967 until 1980 as well as the indoor team that began play in 2011.

== Overview ==
The Rochester River Dogz Football Club were accepted to play in the National Premier Soccer League (NPSL) in November 2015. The River Dogz won their inaugural game 1–0 against FC Buffalo. The River Dogz finished the regular season with a 3–4–3 record. The River Dogz were owned by Marc Mandell and Nick Mojsovski. In 2017 Doug Miller joined the group and convinced Salvatore "SoccerSam" Fantauzzo to be part owner and let the group use the Rochester Lancers name and logo. The Lancers celebrated their 50th year in 2017 with the return of the outdoor Lancers in the National Premier Soccer League (NPSL) and the new Lady Lancers in the United Women's Soccer League (UWS). The 2017 both Lancers outdoor teams played at the Charlie Schiano Field at The Aquinas Institute. Due to renovations at Aquinas the teams moved to the Marina Auto Stadium for the 2018 season. The team was formed in the NASL in 1967. The team played from 1967 to 1980. In 2009 SoccerSam purchased the Lancers name and logo for his soccer collection and to pay tribute to the Legends and pioneers of American soccer. In 2011, SoccerSam introduced the indoor Lancers as part of the MISL which became the MASL. Lancers indoor soccer brought back many familiar Rochester soccer favorites, including Doug Miller who was the team's leading scorer for the first three seasons and then became the head coach in the final year. After the 2015 season the team went into hiatus due to issues with the NYS insurance fund.

== Stadium ==
The Lancers' home field is Wegmans Stadium at the Aquinas Institute, although they played in Marina Auto Stadium for the 2018 season.

== Year-by-year ==
Year	Division	League	Record	Regular season	Playoffs	Open Cup
2016	4	NPSL	3–4–3	4th, Midwest-Great Lakes East	Did not qualify	Did not qualify
2017	4	NPSL	6–4–2	3rd, Midwest-Great Lakes East	Did not qualify	Did not qualify
2018	4	NPSL	6–3–3	3rd, Midwest-Great Lakes East	Did not qualify	Did not qualify
2019	4	NPSL	6–2–2	2nd, Midwest-Great Lakes East	Midwest Region Semifinal	Did not qualify
2020	4	NPSL	Season cancelled due to COVID-19 pandemic			
2021	4	NPSL	2–7–1	5th, Midwest-Rust Belt	Did not qualify	Did not qualify

== Players ==
=== 2017 Roster ===
Note: Flags indicate national team as defined under FIFA eligibility rules; some limited exceptions apply. Players may hold more than one non-FIFA nationality.

No.	Pos.	Nation	Player
0	GK	USA	William Banahene
28	DF	USA	Jake Schindler (Captain)
14	DF	USA	Alex Harling
16	DF	USA	Anthony Rozzano
7	DF	USA	Tim Crawford
9	FW	ENG	Will Stone
22	MF	BRA	Rafael Godoi
4	DF	IRL	Dean Byrne
5	MF	USA	Jared Toth
10	MF	SCO	Ben Allan
24	MF	USA	Matthew Tucker
11	MF	USA	Lukas Fernandes
12	MF	USA	Sammy Wasson
13	MF	USA	August Finn

No.	Pos.	Nation	Player
—	DF	USA	Nikkye De Point
15	MF	USA	Austin Gerber
23	DF	IRL	Glenn Holmes
21	FW	BIH	Zikret Osmic
18	FW	GHA	Isaac Kissi
25	MF	USA	Jesse Toth
3	MF	USA	Antonio Manfut
2	FW	USA	John Imwalle
29	DF	USA	Jayme Kapinos
—	FW	USA	Dominic Coco
20	FW	USA	Mitchell Brickman
17	FW	ENG	Sam Jiggins
30	GK	USA	Joey Kapinos
1	GK	USA	Tyler Brew

=== 2020 Roster ===
Note: Flags indicate national team as defined under FIFA eligibility rules; some limited exceptions apply. Players may hold more than one non-FIFA nationality.

No.	Pos.	Nation	Player
00	GK	USA	Brian Wilkin
1	GK	USA	John Ciavaglia
2	MF	BRA	Rafael Godoi
3	FW	USA	David Wright
4	MF	USA	Gary Boughton
5	MF	USA	Sean Hantes
6	MF	UKR	Bogdan Yatsishin
7	DF	USA	Tim Crawford
9	MF	USA	Dan Reger
10	FW	ENG	Michael Cunningham
11	DF	USA	Anthony Rozzano
12	FW	USA	Darryl Potter

No.	Pos.	Nation	Player
13	MF	USA	Frankie Ciliberto
14	FW	USA	Alex Harling
15	FW	USA	Austin Gerber
16	FW	USA	Andriy Demydiv
17	FW	USA	Peter DiLorenzo
18	MF	USA	Bryan Wolanski
20	DF	BIH	Zikert Osmic
21	MF	USA	Matt D'Amico
22	GK	BRA	Marcelo Moreira
23	MF	USA	Jeremy Ortiz
24	MF	USA	August Finn
25	DF	USA	Jake Reed
27	DF	PER	Diego Mayanga
31	DF	USA	Jeremy Loncao
35	GK	USA	Christian Esposito
19	FW	USA	Doug Miller

Note: Roster up-to-date as of September 6, 2018.
