= Matt Eliason =

American soccer player (born 1988)

Personal information
- Full name: Matthew Eliason
- Date of birth: June 10, 1988 (age 38)
- Place of birth: United States
- Height: 1.83 m (6 ft 0 in)
- Position: Striker

College career
Years	Team	Apps	(Gls)
2008–2010	Northwestern Wildcats	59	(26)

Senior career*
Years	Team	Apps	(Gls)
2013	Red Bulls U-23	2	(0)
2014	Þróttur	20	(7)
- * Club domestic league appearances and goals

Matthew Eliason (born June 10, 1988) is an American former soccer player who played as a striker.

== Early life ==
Eliason attended Glenbard East High School in the United States. He was described as "led the Rams to their two best seasons in school history in a difficult soccer conference". After that, he attended Northwestern University in the United States. He became the soccer team's all-time top scorer with thirty-three goals.

== Career ==
Eliason attended the MLS Combine. He started his career with American side Red Bulls U-23. On August 27, 2013, he debuted for the club during a 2–1 win over Chicago Fire U-23. In 2014, he signed for Icelandic side Þróttur. On May 9, 2014, he debuted for the club during a 4–1 win over Haukar. On May 9, 2014, he scored his first goal for the club during a 4–1 win over Haukar. He was their top scorer during the 2014 season with nine goals in all competitions.

== Style of play ==
Eliason mainly operated as a striker. He was described as having a "pidgeon-toed gait".

== Personal life ==
Eliason has worked at financial organization GE Capital. He has also worked as a journalist for Iceland Magazine. After retiring from professional soccer, he worked as an international management consultant.
