= Adam Gazda =

American soccer player

Personal information
- Full name: Adam Gazda
- Date of birth: March 20, 1987 (age 39)
- Place of birth: Carnegie, Pennsylvania, U.S.
- Height: 5 ft 10 in (1.78 m)
- Position: Midfielder

College career
Years	Team	Apps	(Gls)
2006–2009	Lehigh Mountain Hawks		

Senior career*
Years	Team	Apps	(Gls)
2007–2009	Reading Rage	39	(20)
2010–2011	Pittsburgh Riverhounds	15	(2)
- * Club domestic league appearances and goals as of July 30, 2010

Adam Gazda (born March 20, 1987) is an American former soccer player.

== Career ==
=== College and amateur ===
Gazda attended Chartiers Valley High School and played four years of college soccer at Lehigh University.

During his college years Gazda also played three seasons for Reading Rage in the USL Premier Development League. He was named to the PDL All-League team in 2008.

=== Professional ===
Gazda turned professional in 2010 when he signed to play for the Pittsburgh Riverhounds in the USL Second Division. He made his professional debut on April 24, 2010, in a game against the Charleston Battery.
