= Łukasz Tumicz =

Polish footballer

Personal information
- Full name: Łukasz Tumicz
- Date of birth: 1 March 1985 (age 41)
- Place of birth: Lidzbark Warmiński, Poland
- Height: 1.80 m (5 ft 11 in)
- Position: Forward

Youth career
- 1999–2000: Reduta Bisztynek
- 2000–2002: Stomil Olsztyn
- 2002–2003: Winchendon School

College career
Years	Team	Apps	(Gls)
2004–2007	Rhode Island Rams	74	(31)

Senior career*
Years	Team	Apps	(Gls)
2006–2007	Rhode Island Stingrays	9	(3)
2008–2010	Jagiellonia Białystok	16	(4)
2009	→ Supraślanka Supraśl (loan)	1	(1)
2010	→ OKS 1945 Olsztyn (loan)	10	(4)
2011	Górnik Polkowice	13	(4)
2011–2012	Olimpia Grudziądz	15	(2)
2012	Ruch Radzionków	12	(5)
2012–2013	GKS Tychy	6	(0)
2013–2015	Zagłębie Sosnowiec	70	(13)
2016	Biebrza Goniądz		
2019	Magnat Juchnowiec Kościelny		
- * Club domestic league appearances and goals

Łukasz Tumicz (born 1 March 1985) is a Polish former professional footballer who played as a forward.

== Career ==
Prior to becoming a professional, Tumicz played college soccer at the University of Rhode Island, wearing #31. He also played for the Rhode Island Stingrays during the summers. He was selected 34th overall in the 2008 MLS Supplemental Draft by Columbus Crew, but he did not sign a developmental contract.

He scored his first Ekstraklasa goal on 12 April 2008, in a 1–2 home loss against Wisła Kraków.

In March 2009, following extended health problems, Jagiellonia loaned him out to Supraślanka Supraśl in order to regain fitness.

In January 2011, he joined Górnik Polkowice on a one-and-a-half-year contract.

In July 2011, he signed a contract with Olimpia Grudziądz.

== Honours ==
Jagiellonia Białystok

- Polish Cup: 2009–10
