= Kevin Forrest =

American soccer player

Personal information
- Full name: Kevin Forrest
- Place of birth: Seattle, Washington, United States
- Height: 6 ft 0 in (1.83 m)
- Positions: Forward; winger

College career
Years	Team	Apps	(Gls)
2003–2007	Washington Huskies	68	(34)

Senior career*
Years	Team	Apps	(Gls)
2005	Hibernian & Caledonian		
2008	Seattle Sounders	9	(0)
2009	Seattle Sounders FC	0	(0)
2009	Portland Timbers	10	(0)
2010–2011	Washington Crossfire	12	(0)
Total		31	(0)
- * Club domestic league appearances and goals

Kevin Forrest (born November 3) is an American retired soccer player.

== Career ==
=== Youth and college ===
Forrest grew up in Edmonds, Washington, and began his career with various youth soccer teams in the Seattle area, including Emerald City FC, and the Crossfire Sounders, where he was coached by former Seattle Sounders coach Alan Hinton. Forrest attended Edmonds-Woodway High School, and played college soccer at the University of Washington, scoring 34 goals and earning All-American and Pac-10 honors including Pac-10 Player of the Year in 2006. He medical redshirted the 2005 season with the onset of plantar fasciitis. His final season, 2007, was cut short despite a promising beginning when he suffered a season ending stress fracture.

During his college years Forrest also played for Hibernian & Caledonian in the Pacific Coast Soccer League winning a USASA national championship in 2005.

=== Professional ===
Forrest was drafted by Colorado Rapids with the third pick of the 2008 MLS Supplemental Draft, but was suffering from another stress fracture in pre-season training, and was eventually released by the Rapids on March 3, 2008. On July 31, 2008, Forrest signed with the Seattle Sounders of the USL First Division for the remainder of the season, and subsequently played in nine games for the team.

On 24 March 2009, Forrest signed a contract with MLS expansion team Seattle Sounders FC for the 2009 season after the Sounders acquired his rights from the Rapids. He made no league appearances but played in one US Open Cup game, scoring against his former team Colorado Rapids in a 1–0 victory. On July 2, 2009, Forrest started a game for the Portland Timbers against Bayern Munich II. He scored the game's first goal in the 8th minute and the Timbers signed him to a contract for the remainder of the 2009 season, and he subsequently played in the 10 remaining games for the team on the way to their league title and record 23-game unbeaten streak. He recorded the game-winning assist against eventual champions Montreal Impact in regular season play.

Forrest signed with Washington Crossfire of the USL Premier Development League for the 2010 season. He also coached two teams at the Crossfire Premier youth soccer club.

== Personal ==
Kevin is the son of former Seattle Sounders player Ward Forrest. Kevin's mother, Theresa Mead Forrest, was a member of the first women's soccer team in Seattle, and she met her husband Ward when he was her coach. Kevin has two older sisters, Cathleen and Julie, and one younger sister, Madeleine. Julie played four years of college soccer and was captain of the team at Portland State University. The Forrests have a yellow lab named Bailey who is also considered a part of the family.

== Honors ==
=== Portland Timbers ===
- USL First Division Commissioner's Cup (1): 2009
