= Neco Martínez =

Colombian footballer (born 1982)

Personal information
- Full name: Luis Enrique Martínez Rodríguez
- Date of birth: July 11, 1982 (age 44)
- Place of birth: Necoclí, Colombia
- Height: 1.91 m (6 ft 3 in)
- Position: Goalkeeper

Senior career*
Years	Team	Apps	(Gls)
2001	Envigado	2	(0)
2001	Atlético Huila	5	(0)
2002–2003	Guanacasteca	7	(0)
2003–2004	Envigado	17	(0)
2004–2006	Santa Fe	61	(0)
2006–2009	Sakaryaspor	43	(0)
2007–2008	→ Manisaspor (loan)	2	(0)
2010–2012	Once Caldas	57	(0)
2012	Envigado	8	(0)
2013	→ Atlético Nacional (loan)	21	(0)
2014–2016	Atlético Nacional	45	(0)
2017	América de Cali	0	(0)
Total		268	(0)

International career
2003–2011	Colombia	8	(1)
- * Club domestic league appearances and goals

Luis Enrique "Neco" Martínez Rodríguez, (born 11 July 1982) is a Colombian retired footballer who played as a goalkeeper. He is nicknamed "Neco" for the town of his birth.

== Career ==
Martínez was signed by newly promoted Turkish team Sakaryaspor in summer 2006, signing a three-year contract, before moving to Colombian club Once Caldas.

== International career ==
During a World Cup warm-up match between Poland and Colombia on May 30, 2006, he scored a remarkable goal, striking directly from a long distance over the head of the opposition goalkeeper, Tomasz Kuszczak.

After a three-year absence from the national team, he was called back by new coach Hernan Dario Gomez for an international friendly match against Bolivia on August 5, 2010.

He was the starting goalkeeper for the Colombia national team during the Copa America 2011, since the starting goalkeeper David Ospina was out with a facial injury after colliding with Hugo Rodallega days before the tournament. Martinez had a good start to the tournament, being the only goalkeeper to have a clean sheet on all three group games. In the quarterfinal match against Peru however he made two crucial mistakes which led to the two goals of Peru.

=== International goals ===
Scores and results list Colombia's goal tally first.

#	Date	Venue	Opponent	Score	Final	Competition
1.	30 May 2006	Silesian Stadium, Chorzów, Poland	Poland	2–0	2–1	Friendly

== Honours ==
=== Club ===
Once Caldas

- Categoría Primera A (1): 2010-II

Atlético Nacional

- Categoría Primera A (3): 2013-I, 2013-II, 2014-I
- Copa Colombia (1): 2013

Individual

- Toulon Tournament Best Goalkeeper: 2001

== See also ==
- List of goalscoring goalkeepers
