= Brad North =

American soccer player and businessman

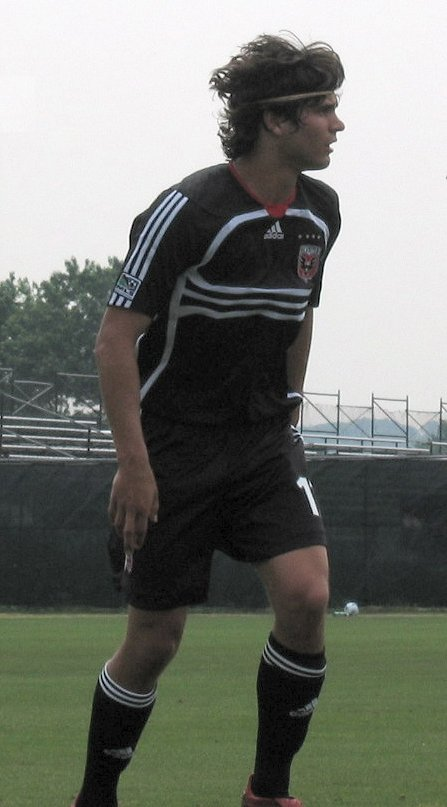

Personal information
- Full name: Joseph Bradley North
- Date of birth: January 21, 1985 (age 41)
- Place of birth: The Woodlands, Texas, U.S.
- Height: 6 ft 1 in (1.85 m)
- Position: Forward

Youth career
- 1999–2004: Texans SC (Houston)
- 2003–06: Northwestern

Senior career*
Years	Team	Apps	(Gls)
2006	Chicago Fire Premier	13	(2)
2007	D.C. United	0	(0)
- * Club domestic league appearances and goals as of 15 Sept 2007 ‡ National team caps and goals as of 15 Sept 2007

Brad North (born January 21, 1985) is an American retired soccer player and now businessman. A 6'1", 190 lb. forward from Northwestern University, North was a two-time All Big Ten first team selection, scoring 28 goals (10 GWG), 8 assists over a four-year career, and a three-time Big Ten Academic All-Conference Team. North was the first player from Northwestern U. to be picked in the MLS SuperDraft.

== Playing career ==
=== MLS ===
North was selected by D.C. United in the second round (24th overall) of the 2007 MLS SuperDraft. He appeared in each of the reserve's 12 games (11 starts), seeing time at both forward and as a defender. Started in the US Open Cup match at Harrisburg, which would be his only official appearance for the club. He was waived the following year.

Made 3 appearances during the 2008 season with the Fire Reserves against teams including; former club D.C United (30 min, 1 goal), Columbus Crew (41 min), and F.C. Toronto (37 min, 1 goal).

=== Premier Development League ===
North made 13 appearances for the Chicago Fire Premier of the Premier Development League's Great Lakes division in 2006 and had one assist in the regular season and 2 overtime goals in the first playoff game before the Des Moines Menace answered with two goals to force a shoot-out (which the Chicago Fire Premier won).

== See also ==
- List of current American soccer players by US state
