= Gary Boughton =

American soccer player

Personal information
- Full name: Gary Boughton
- Date of birth: November 16, 1988 (age 37)
- Place of birth: Buffalo, New York, United States
- Height: 5 ft 10 in (1.78 m)
- Position: Midfielder

Team information
- Current team: FC Buffalo

College career
| Years | Team | Apps | (Gls) |
| 2006–2009 | Medaille Mavericks | | |

Senior career*
| Years | Team | Apps | (Gls) |
| 2007–2008 | Fort Wayne Fever | 28 | (7) |
| 2009 | Austin Aztex U23 | 6 | (0) |
| 2010 | Newark Ironbound Express | 3 | (1) |
| 2010 | Houston Leones | 12 | (0) |
| 2011 | F.C. New York | 21 | (1) |
| 2011–2015 | Rochester Lancers (indoor) | 67 | (39) |
| 2012 | FC Buffalo | 11 | (2) |
| 2013 | Niagara United | 9 | (1) |
| 2015 | Cedar Rapids Rampage (indoor) | 2 | (0) |
| 2015–2016 | Syracuse Silver Knights (indoor) | 10 | (3) |
| 2017 | FC Buffalo | 6 | (1) |
| 2018– | Rochester Lancers (indoor) | 24 | (15) |
- * Club domestic league appearances and goals as of August 1, 2016

Gary Boughton (born November 16, 1988) is an American soccer player played in the USL Premier Development League, USL Professional League, Major Indoor Soccer League, National Premier Soccer League, and the Canadian Soccer League.

== Career ==
=== College and amateur ===
Boughton played college soccer at Medaille College. He led his Medaille team to four straight undefeated conference championships, three trips to the NCAA tournament, and in his senior year smashed the NCAA career assists record, registering 82 career assists in his four years. He also tallied 35 goals in 86 career collegiate games. Boughton's individual achievements included being named an NSCAA Scholar All-American twice, an NSCAA Regional All-American four times, AMCC Conference Player of the Year twice, AMCC 1st Team All-Conference player four times, and AMCC Newcomer of the Year.

During his college years Boughton also played extensively in the USL Premier Development League, for Fort Wayne Fever, the Austin Aztex U23s, Newark Ironbound Express and the Houston Leones.

=== Professional ===
Boughton signed his first professional contract in 2011 when he was signed by F.C. New York of the USL Professional Division. He made his professional debut on April 9, 2011, in New York's first-ever game, a 3–0 loss to Orlando City, and scored his first professional goal on June 10 in a 3–0 win over the Dayton Dutch Lions. Following the USL season Boughton trained with MLS side Sporting Kansas City. He participated in a Reserve League match on September 18, entering in the second half of a 1–0 win over Real Salt Lake.

Boughton joined the Rochester Lancers in 2011, their inaugural season in the Major Indoor Soccer League. After tallying 8 goals in 21 games during his rookie season, Boughton signed a new multi-year contract with the team. In 2012, he signed a contract with FC Buffalo of the National Premier Soccer League. In 2013, he went north of the border to sign with Niagara United of the Canadian Soccer League.
