= David Roth (soccer) =

American soccer player

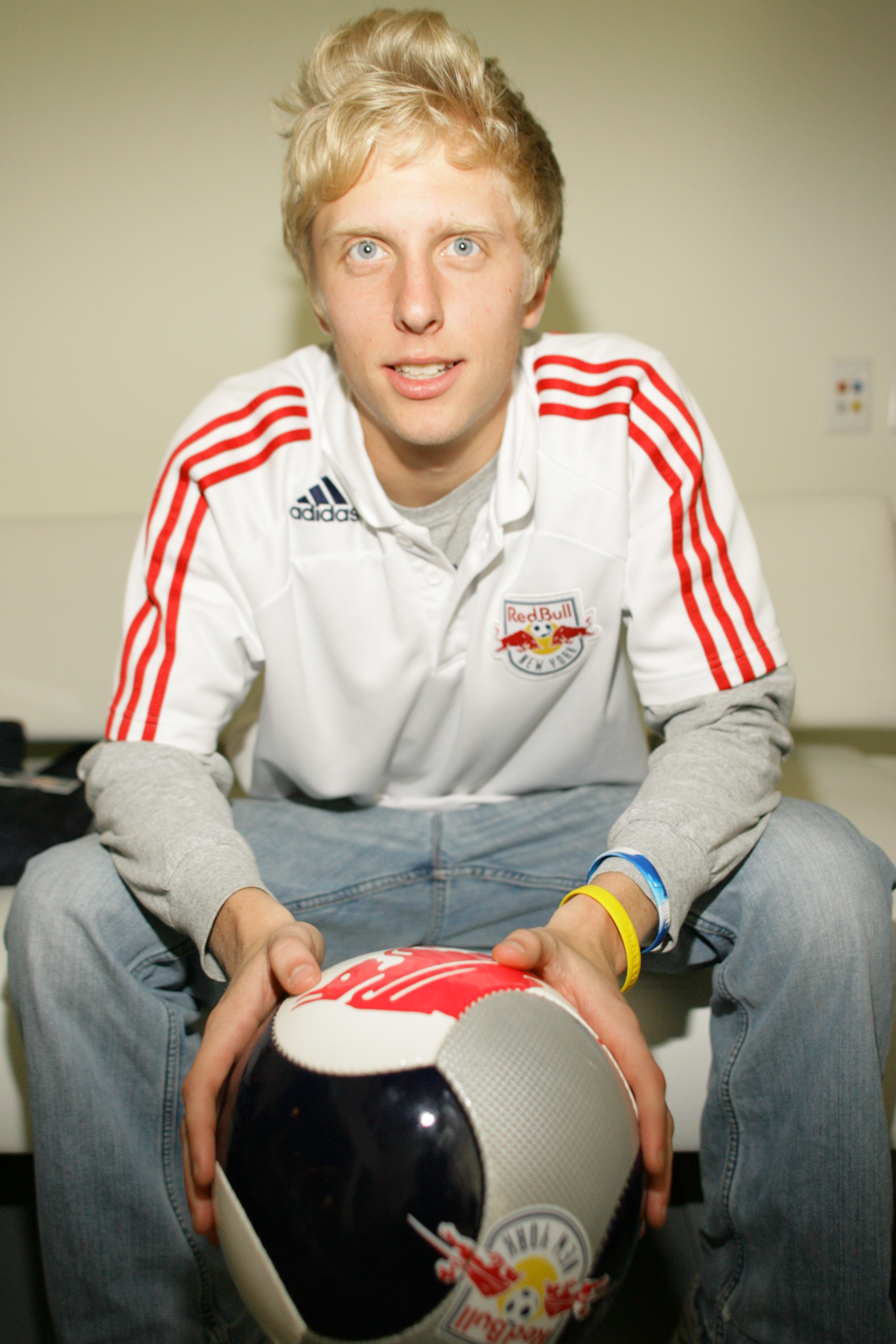

Personal information
- Full name: David Roth
- Date of birth: December 4, 1985 (age 40)
- Place of birth: St. Louis, Missouri, United States
- Height: 5 ft 8 in (1.73 m)
- Position: Midfielder

Youth career
- 2004–2007: Northwestern University

Senior career*
Years	Team	Apps	(Gls)
2006–2007	Chicago Fire Premier	19	(6)
2008–2009	New York Red Bulls	0	(0)
- * Club domestic league appearances and goals as of 4 June 2008

David Roth (born December 4, 1985, St. Louis, Missouri), is an American former soccer midfielder. Former Chicago Rainmaker Forward

== Career ==
Roth played college soccer for Northwestern University from 2004 to 2007. During his career there he played 83 games and scored 19 goals and 32 assists. Roth was a Big 10 First Team member in 2006 and 2007 and a NSCAA All-American Second Team member in 2007. Roth was also a NSCAA All-Great Lakes Region First Team member in 2006 and 2007 and in 2007 named All-America by the NSCAA - the first Northwestern Soccer player in history. He also became the first soccer player to be named to the Northwestern Hall of Fame. D

Roth was drafted by New York Red Bulls with the 44 overall pick (4th round) in the 2008 MLS SuperDraft. He injured his left knee on February 15, 2008, in a scrimmage against Hammarby IF. Roth had successful knee surgery six days later and was out 3–4 months.

Roth become a fan favorite even before he took to the field. Roth played the drums with the Empire Supporters Club on April 27, 2008.

He made his professional debut on 1 July 2008, in the Lamar Hunt U.S. Open Cup against Crystal Palace USA, coming on as a 63rd minute substitution. That was the only game Roth played for New York. The club released him in February 2009.

He trained many youth soccer teams in NJ.

Roth was also chosen for the Messi vs. Friends charity game in Chicago at Soldier Field. He has a significant role in the Messi and Me Documentary which chronicles the Messi and Friends game in which 10 Northwestern players participated.
