= Doug Miller (soccer) =

American soccer player (born 1969)

Personal information
- Date of birth: May 5, 1969 (age 57)
- Place of birth: Succasunna, New Jersey, United States
- Height: 5 ft 8 in (1.73 m)
- Position: Forward

College career
Years	Team	Apps	(Gls)
1987–1990	Loyola Greyhounds		

Senior career*
Years	Team	Apps	(Gls)
1991–1992	Baltimore Blast (indoor)	12	(2)
1992–1994	Harrisburg Heat (indoor)	65	(61)
1994	New York Fever		
1994–1996	Cleveland Crunch (indoor)	74	(96)
1996–1999	Rochester Raging Rhinos	86	(53)
1996–2001	Buffalo Blizzard (indoor)	165	(208)
2001	Hershey Wildcats	4	(2)
2003–2006	Rochester Raging Rhinos	60	(22)
2011–2015	Rochester Lancers (indoor)	74	(79)
2016	Syracuse Silver Knights (indoor)	7	(4)
2020	Rochester Lancers (indoor)	2	(3)
- * Club domestic league appearances and goals

Doug Miller (born May 5, 1969) is an American youth soccer coach and retired soccer player. He spent one season in Major Indoor Soccer League and nine in the National Professional Soccer League as a forward, winning two championships and leading the league in scoring in 1998–99. Miller also played ten seasons of outdoor soccer in the USISL and A-League. He was the 1996 and 1997 USISL A-League leading scorer and 1997 league MVP. He also won one U.S. Open Cup.

In 2011, he became the first player signed to the new Rochester Lancers indoor team and was named the first team captain in the club's history.

== Youth and college ==
Miller was born in the Succasunna section of Roxbury Township, New Jersey. He began playing soccer at the Roxbury Recreation Soccer League when he was five, graduating to the Roxbury Travelling Team when he turned eight. He played for his high school team, coming to the attention of Loyola College in Maryland which offered him a full athletic scholarship. Miller spent four seasons (1987–1990) with the Greyhounds, serving as team captain his junior and senior seasons. While he finished his collegiate career in 1990, he did not complete his bachelor's degree in communications and public relations until 1993.

== Professional ==
In 1991, the Kansas City Comets of Major Indoor Soccer League (MISL) selected Miller with the first pick in the MISL draft. However, the team folded before the start of the season and Miller moved to the Baltimore Blast in October 1991. In the summer of 1992, MISL and the Blast both collapsed and Miller moved to the Harrisburg Heat of the National Professional Soccer League (NPSL) in September 1992. In March 1994, the Heat traded Miller to the Cleveland Crunch. He remained with the Crunch through the end of the 1995–96 season, winning the NPSL championship with them in 1994 and 1996. In 1994, Miller also played outdoors with the New York Fever in the USISL. In 1996, the expansion Rochester Raging Rhinos of the A-League signed Miller. In their first season, Miller and his teammates went to both the league and U.S. Open Cup finals, losing both. After not scoring in the first twelve games of the season, Miller finished with eighteen goals to lead the league. He finished second in points, but garnered first team All Star recognition. That fall, Miller signed with the Buffalo Blizzard of the NPSL. He would alternate between the outdoor Rhinos and the indoor Blizzard for the next several years. He led the team in scoring during the 1996–1997 season which led to a four-year guaranteed contract with the Blizzard. In 1997, the A-League merged with the USISL to form the USISL A-League. That year, Miller led the league in both goals and points, earning first team All Star and league MVP honors. However, Miller injured his knee at the end of the season which continued to negatively impact him through the 1997-1998 indoor season and into the 1998 outdoor season. By the fall of 1998, he was fully fit and Miller led the NPSL in scoring with 102 goals, earning first team All Star recognition. In 1999, the Rhinos went to the A-League championship, but lost. However, they won the U.S. Open Cup with Miller taking MVP honors. Following the victory, the Rhinos released Miller. He continued to play with the Blizzard until the team folded in 2001. In the summer 2001, he joined the Hershey Wildcats of the A-League. The Wildcats went to the league championship, but lost to the Rhinos. They promptly folded. In December 2002, Miller rejoined the Rhinos. He played four seasons with the Rhinos before retiring in the fall of 2006. In 2003, he was again a first team All Star as he was second in the league in scoring. In 2011, Miller came out of retirement to sign with the Rochester Lancers.

Miller once again came out of retirement in 2020 to play for the Rochester Lancers, scoring 3 goals in 2 games. In doing so, he became the first American soccer player to play in four different decades.

== Coaching ==
In 1993, Miller became the Director of Soccer at Team USA Pro-Soccer Camp, a summer youth soccer camp. He also served as the Director of player development for the Greece Buccaneers. Miller currently owns and operates the Doug Miller Rochester Rhinos Academy in Rochester, New York. In 2009, Miller acquired the rights to the women's USL W-League soccer franchise in Rochester NY, starting the Rochester Ravens FC.

In August 2014, he was named head coach of Rochester Lancers indoor soccer team.
