= Cesar Zambrano =

American soccer player

Personal information
- Date of birth: July 12, 1984 (age 42)
- Place of birth: Chicago, IL, USA
- Height: 6 ft 1 in (1.85 m)
- Position: Midfielder

College career
Years	Team	Apps	(Gls)
2005–2007	UIC Flames		

Senior career*
Years	Team	Apps	(Gls)
2005–2007	Chicago Fire Premier	24	(5)
2008–2009	Colorado Rapids	1	(0)
- * Club domestic league appearances and goals as of September 27, 2008

Cesar Zambrano (born July 12, 1984) is an American professional soccer player. Attended Brother Rice High School (Chicago). He attended college at the University of Illinois at Chicago.

Zambrano spent two seasons, 2006 and 2007, with the Chicago Fire Premier in the fourth division Premier Development League.
