= Florida Tropics SC =

Professional soccer club based in Lakeland, Florida

- Founded: 2016; 10 years ago
- Stadium: Lake Myrtle Sports Complex
- Capacity: 1,500
- Owner(s): Central Florida Sports Ventures, LLC
- Head Coach: Clay Roberts; Evans Frimpong
- League: Major Arena Soccer League; United Premier Soccer League
- 2022–23: 3rd, Eastern Division; Playoffs: Quarterfinals
- Website: www.fltropics.com

Florida Tropics SC is a professional soccer club based in Lakeland, Florida. They are owned by Central Florida Sports Ventures, LLC, led by Dr. Panos Iakovidis, and former USL commissioner and Rochester Rhinos owner Chris Economides. The organization was originally founded in 2015 as a team in the Major Arena Soccer League before expanding into other leagues.

The Tropics organization operates three senior teams across two different leagues. The first team is Florida Tropics SC, which plays in the professional Major Arena Soccer League. The club also fields two men's outdoor teams. The top outdoor is Tropics SC, which plays in the United Premier Soccer League First Division. There is also a Tropics Reserves team playing the UPSL's Second Division.

The club previously fielded a USL League Two team known as the Lakeland Tropics, and a Women's Premier Soccer League team.

In addition to the senior squads, the Tropics organization also oversees two youth clubs in Central Florida. Lakeland Tropics FC in Lakeland, and Celebration FC Tropics in Celebration.

== History ==
On May 3, 2016, the Tropics, in conjunction with the newly formed IPL, held a press conference at the RP Funding Center and stated they would be joining the IPL alongside the Baltimore Blast, Harrisburg Heat, and St. Louis Ambush. However, on August 29, 2016, it was announced that all IPL teams including Florida would be joining the MASL. The team finished 3rd in their division in their inaugural season, and averaged over 2,500 fans a game including one sell out. In their second season in the MASL, the Tropics again fell just short of the playoffs, finishing 3rd in the Eastern Division. It was in 2017 that the club fielded their first USL League Two franchise, and in 2019 a new squad was created to play in the UPSL Pro Premier Florida Division, who went on to win the leagues national championship. The official supporter group of the Tropics organization is the Swan City Syndicate.

The Tropics succeed the Tampa Bay area as the local indoor soccer club. The team is unrelated to the original Tampa Bay Rowdies, who were notorious for their indoor soccer success, as well as their outdoor. A current Rowdies team began to play in 2010 and is also unrelated to that club; the team exclusively plays outdoor soccer. Indoor soccer by the original Rowdies had officially ended when the team played in the American Indoor Soccer Association for one season (1986–87). For two seasons, another Tampa Bay area team played in the same league, from 1995 to 1997, called the Tampa Bay Terror; however, the team did not last more than two seasons, despite having some members of the Rowdies on the roster. It would not be until the Tropics first season that indoor soccer would return to the area.

On April 21, 2023, it was announced that the Tropics would no longer play Major Arena Soccer League games in Lakeland. The team cited the rising cost of rent at the RP Funding Center. Three months later, on July 12, 2023, the Major Arena Soccer League announced the Tropics would be suspended for the 2023-24 Major Arena Soccer League season, while the MASL would work with Tropics ownership to resume play in 2024-25.

== Personnel ==
=== 2022–23 roster ===
==== Active players ====
- As of December 28, 2022

Note: Flags indicate national team as defined under FIFA eligibility rules; some limited exceptions apply. Players may hold more than one non-FIFA nationality.

No.	Pos.	Nation	Player
0	GK	BRA	Txai Empke
1	GK	USA	Jorge Navarrete
3	DF	USA	Chad Vandegriffe
3	DF	USA	Mike Jones
4	FW	BRA	Junior Alencar
5	DF	BRA	Lucas Teixeira
7	FW	BRA	Victor Parreiras
8	FW	USA	Zach Reget
9	FW	USA	Julian Hall
11	FW	BRA	Ricardo Carvalho
12	FW	USA	Taylor Walter Bond
13	GK	USA	Chris Frederick

No.	Pos.	Nation	Player
14	FW	TRI	Kiel Williams
16	DF	USA	Drew Ruggles
18	DF	USA	Ben-Avir Espinal
22	MF	USA	Anthony Arico
23	DF	USA	JP Reyes
28	FW	BRA	Vini Dantas
32	DF	BRA	Breno Oliveira
33	DF	BRA	Rafael Alves
85	MF	BRA	Lucio Gonzaga
88	GK	USA	Matt Perrella
90	DF	BRA	Lucas Montelares
96	MF	USA	Julio Varela

==== Inactive players ====
Note: Flags indicate national team as defined under FIFA eligibility rules; some limited exceptions apply. Players may hold more than one non-FIFA nationality.

No.	Pos.	Nation	Player
19	DF	BRA	Guilherme Dos Santos

=== Staff ===
- (United States) Clay Roberts – Head coach, (2016–present)
- (United States) Kevin Curtin – Assistant coach, (2022–present)
- (United States) Nick Olgee - Trainer, (2021–present)
- (United States) Dr. Panos Iakovidis - Team owner, (2017–present)

== Venues ==
- RP Funding Center, Lakeland (MASL; 2016–2023)
- Bryant Stadium, Lakeland (USL2 & WPSL; 2017–2019)
- St. Petersburg High School Stadium, St. Petersburg (WPSL; 2018)
- Lake Myrtle Sports Complex, Auburndale (UPSL & USOC; 2019–present)
- Tournament Sportsplex of Tampa Bay, Tampa (WPSL; 2019)
- Premier Sports Complex, Lakewood Ranch (WPSL; 2019)
