= Rich Ryerson =

American soccer player and coach (born 1965)

Personal information
- Full name: Richard Ryerson
- Date of birth: May 14, 1965 (age 61)
- Height: 6 ft 1 in (1.85 m)
- Position: Midfielder

College career
Years	Team	Apps	(Gls)
1983–1986	UNLV Rebels	84	(20)

Senior career*
Years	Team	Apps	(Gls)
1988–89	Kinna IF		
1990	California Emperors	20	(1)
1991	Salt Lake Sting	11	(0)
1991	Maryland Bays	2	(0)
1993	Los Angeles Salsa	20	(0)
1993–1994	Cleveland Crunch (indoor)	23	(3)
1994	San Jose Grizzlies (indoor)	21	(13)
1995	Washington Warthogs (indoor)	0	(0)
1995	San Jose Grizzlies (indoor)	23	(8)
1996	Indianapolis Twisters (indoor)	28	(5)
1997	→ Indiana Twisters (indoor)	2	(0)
1997	Anaheim Splash (indoor)	21	(5)
1998	Baton Rouge Bombers (indoor)	27	(12)

Managerial career
- 2008–2009: UNLV Rebels (assistant)
- 2010–2021: UNLV Rebels
- * Club domestic league appearances and goals

Richard Ryerson (born May 14, 1965) is an American former soccer midfielder and former Amplus Academy school teacher, who spent three seasons in the American Professional Soccer League, one in the National Professional Soccer League, one in the Eastern Indoor Soccer League and four in the Continental Indoor Soccer League. He also played in the Swedish second division and was the head coach for the UNLV Rebels men's soccer team for eleven years.

== Youth ==
Ryerson, brother to Rob Ryerson, attended Oakland Mills High School. He then attended UNLV, where he played on the men's soccer team from 1983 to 1986. He finished his career holding the school's records with 84 career games. He graduated in 1987 with a bachelor's degree in business administration.

In 2010, the 1985 squad that Ryerson was a member of was inducted into the UNLV Athletics Hall of Fame.

== Professional ==
In 1990, Ryerson played for the California Emperors in the American Professional Soccer League. The Emperors folded at the end of the season, and Ryerson spent time with two teams, the Maryland Bays and Salt Lake Sting, during the 1991 APSL season. In 1993, he played twenty games with the Los Angeles Salsa of APSL, losing to the Colorado Foxes in the league championship.

In 1993, Ryerson was with the Los Angeles Heat of the APSL. On October 28, 1993, the Heat loaned Ryerson to the Cleveland Crunch of the National Professional Soccer League. In the summer of 1994, Ryerson played for the San Jose Grizzlies of the Continental Indoor Soccer League (CISL). In 1995, he moved to the Washington Warthogs before ending the season back with the Grizzlies. In 1996, he played for the Indianapolis Twisters. At the end of the season, the Twisters were renamed the Indiana Twisters. Ryerson began the season with Indiana, but suffered a concussion after only two games. In July, the Twisters traded him and Terry Rowe to the Anaheim Splash in exchange for Paul McDonnell and a 1998 first-round draft pick. Ryerson had played only two games with Indiana this season due to a concussion. In 1997, he also played for the U.S. national futsal team. Ryerson finished his career in 1998 with the Baton Rouge Bombers in the Eastern Indoor Soccer League, where he was named the EISL Defender of the Year. He also played for Kinna IF for two seasons in the Swedish Second Division in 1988–89.

== Coach ==
Beginning in 1994, Ryerson served as an athletic director and physical education teacher for various schools in Rancho Mirage, California, namely Marywood-Palm Valley School. On June 14, 2008, Ryerson became an assistant coach of the men’s team at UNLV. In the Spring of 2010, Ryerson became head coach of the men’s team. In 2014, Ryerson led the Rebels to their first NCAA Tournament appearance in 26 seasons, along with winning the WAC regular season and the WAC men's soccer tournament. In 2016, Ryerson led the Rebels to a second WAC men’s soccer tournament title. In May of 2021, Ryerson announced that he would be stepping down as the coach of the Rebels at the end of the Fall 2021 season, stating, "It has been an absolute honor to steward the UNLV men’s soccer team for the last 11 years, and I could not be more proud to serve one more season this fall."

== Honors ==
=== Player ===
Los Angeles Salsa

- APSL playoffs runner-up: 1993

=== Manager ===
UNLV

- WAC men’s soccer regular season: 2014
- WAC men's soccer tournament: 2014, 2016

=== Individual ===
- All-Region Second-Team: 1984
- EISL Defender of the Year: 1998
