= Sean Connor =

Northern Irish footballer (born 1967)

- Connor as Galway United manager

Personal information
- Date of birth: 12 July 1967 (age 59)
- Place of birth: Belfast, Northern Ireland

Team information
- Current team: Gaborone United (head coach)

Senior career*
Years	Team	Apps	(Gls)
1987–1988	Distillery		
1988–1990	Port Vale	0	(0)
1989–1990	→ Macclesfield Town (loan)		
1990–1991	Ards		
1991	Cliftonville		

Managerial career
- 2004–2006: Sligo Rovers
- 2006–2007: Bohemians
- 2008–2009: Dundalk
- 2010–2011: Galway United
- 2012: CAPS United
- 2014: Black Leopards
- 2019–2021: Institute
- 2024–2025: Matebele
- 2025–2026: Jwaneng Galaxy
- 2026–: Gaborone United
- * Club domestic league appearances and goals

Sean Connor (born 12 July 1967) is a Northern Irish football manager and former player who is the head coach at Botswana Premier League club Gaborone United.

He had a brief playing career which included spells at Distillery, Port Vale, Macclesfield Town, Ards, and Cliftonville. He spent some years as a coach in the United States and England before he was appointed as manager of Sligo Rovers in September 2004. He led the club to the League of Ireland First Division title in 2005. He took charge at Bohemians in November 2006, where he became the first manager to achieve UEFA pro-licence in the League of Ireland before leaving in December 2007. He was appointed Dundalk manager in December 2008 and then joined Galway United as manager in December 2010.

He then had spells coaching in Africa with the Zimbabwean side CAPS United in 2012 and the South African club Black Leopards, whom he prepared pre-season for in 2014. He returned to management in Northern Ireland with Institute in September 2019, where he would remain for two years. He returned to South Africa as technical director at Cape Town Spurs in October 2023. He then joined Botswana Premier League side Matebele as head coach in August 2024. He switched to Jwaneng Galaxy the following year, winning the Botswana FA Challenge Cup.

== Playing career ==
Connor began his career at Distillery in the Irish League, playing for the club in the 1987–88 season before he joined English Third Division club Port Vale. He never made an appearance for the "Valiants" in the English Football League. He went out on loan to Macclesfield Town of the Conference before he returned to Northern Ireland to play for Ards. He was involved in a car accident soon after signing for Ards, breaking his chest bone, some ribs, puncturing his lung and damaging his left leg. He made a return to football with Cliftonville but retired shortly afterwards.

== Managerial career ==
=== Early career ===
After spending some time as press officer for Birmingham City, Connor moved to America where he coached in the USL First Division under John McGinlay for Cincinnati Riverhawks, Boston Bulldogs and in the Eastern Indoor Soccer League with the Lafayette SwampCats. He also spent time coaching non-League clubs in England and scouting for Stoke City and Lincoln City.

=== League of Ireland ===
Connor was appointed Sligo Rovers manager in September 2004 upon the recommendation of Steve Bruce. He led the club to the League of Ireland First Division title in 2005 as Rovers finished two points clear of second-place Dublin City. He then took the club to fifth place in the League of Ireland Premier Division in 2006 and the semi-finals of the FAI Cup, where they lost to Derry City after a replay. During his time at The Showgrounds he signed Premier League and Everton stalwart Séamus Coleman. Connor tendered his resignation in November 2006 after stating that he felt he was "never fully accepted" at the club and life there was like "living in a goldfish bowl".

He was appointed manager of Bohemians in November 2006. He led the "Bohs" to third-place in 2007, losing only seven games all season, keeping 16 clean sheets, which was a League of Ireland record at the time, along with earning them a place in the UEFA Intertoto Cup. He took the club to the League Cup final, losing to Derry City in extra time. He also took the club to the semi-finals of the FAI Cup, where they were beaten by Cork City at Dalymount Park. However, he was sacked by the club after he allegedly made "advances of a sexual nature" to a female volunteer; Connor denied the claim. Connor later took Bohemians to court for wrongful dismissal and the two parties reached an "amicable settlement", which remained confidential.

In December 2008, he was appointed as the manager of newly-promoted Premier Division side Dundalk, who were transitioning from amateur status to becoming professional. He was voted Premier Division Manager of the Month for July 2009, and led the club to a fifth-place finish in the 2009 season, earning them a place in the following season's UEFA Europa League qualification rounds. He resigned in November 2009.

In January 2010, he signed a three-year contract to manage Galway United. He led the "Tribesmen" to an eighth-place finish in the 2010 season, and a relegation play-off win over Bray Wanderers at Terryland Park secured the club a place in the top-flight for the following year. His contract was "terminated by mutual agreement" in September 2011 after the club suffered their 23rd consecutive league defeat.

=== Africa ===
In January 2012, Connor was appointed as manager of Zimbabwe Premier Soccer League side CAPS United. His contract was terminated in August 2012 following a poor run of results. He later fled Zimbabwe after stating that the club still owed him $90,000, and that the players deliberately underperformed to get him the sack. He spent some time in South Africa without finances as the legal battle with CAPS United continued.

He signed a three-year contract to manage South African National First Division side Black Leopards in July 2014.

He then joined the coaching staff at the Maiden City Soccer Academy in County Londonderry in March 2015.

=== Institute ===
On 14 September 2019, he returned to senior management when he was appointed as first-team manager at NIFL Premiership club Institute. The "Sky Blues" were relegated when the 2019–20 season was curtailed due to the COVID-19 pandemic in Northern Ireland; Connor said the decision to relegate the club without the full fixture list completed was "a very, very sad day for football". The 2020–21 campaign did not take place due to the pandemic. He was later released on 17 August 2021, "following deep and personal discussions".

=== Return to Africa ===
He returned to South Africa as football consultant and technical director at Cape Town Spurs on 3 October 2023, where he developed a strategic five-year plan for the club. On 1 August 2024, Connor was appointed head coach at Botswana Premier League side Matebele, in addition to the recruitment team in conjunction with the Technical Director. He signed a two-year contract with Jwaneng Galaxy and within a week had led the club to win the Botswana FA Challenge Cup with a 2–0 win over Security Systems.

In February 2026, Connor left Galaxy, then top of the league, joining rivals Gaborone United.

== Other work ==
He started the sports performance and elite coaching consultancy business Mind Aware Performance in 2018, which deals with clubs, players and organisations to improve, develop and work one-on-one. Connor started the columns The Technical Area with the Derry Journal and Belfast Newsletter in January 2019 which appeared fortnightly in both publications. He also worked as radio analyst with Ocean FM covering League of Ireland games and with the BBC covering Derry City and Irish league games.

== Honours ==
Individual

- League of Ireland Premier Division Manager of the Month: July 2009

Sligo Rovers

- League of Ireland First Division: 2005

Jwaneng Galaxy

- Botswana FA Challenge Cup: 2025
