= Scott Gaither =

American soccer player

Personal information
- Date of birth: June 28, 1969 (age 57)
- Place of birth: United States
- Positions: Forward; defender

Youth career
- 1987: Lewis University
- 1990: Johnson County Community College

Senior career*
Years	Team	Apps	(Gls)
1991	Kansas City Comets (indoor)	1	(0)
1992–1993	Kansas City Attack (indoor)	29	(21)
1993	Detroit Rockers (indoor)	8	(2)
1993	Monterrey La Raza (indoor)		
1995	Portland Pride (indoor)		
1995	Las Vegas Dustdevils (indoor)	25	(16)
1998	Mississippi Beach Kings (indoor)		
- * Club domestic league appearances and goals

Scott Gaither is an American retired soccer player. He played professionally in the Major Indoor Soccer League, National Professional Soccer League and Eastern Indoor Soccer League.

== Youth ==
Gaither graduated from Belton High School. He attended Lewis University playing only one season of soccer there before leaving to get married. He entered the University of Missouri–Kansas City, but left to turn professional before he had played for them. In 1990, having failed to earn a professional contract, Gaither attended Johnson County Community College where he played for one season.

== Professional ==
In 1990, Gaither was invited to play at the MISL All-Star Budweiser Classic, a four team invitation tournament organized by the Major Indoor Soccer League to showcase potential talent for the upcoming college draft. This led to the Kansas City Comets drafting Gaither, but he was signed to an amateur contract. The Comets folded in 1991. In 1992, the Kansas City Attack of the National Professional Soccer League signed Gaither. He began the season in Kansas City, but was traded to the Detroit Rockers at the end of the season. That season, he led the league in fouls. In the summer of 1993, Gaither moved to the Monterrey La Raza of the Continental Indoor Soccer League. In 1994, he played for the Portland Pride of the CISL. On June 14, 1995, the Dustdevils signed Gaither. On May 6, 1998, Gaither signed with the Mississippi Beach Kings of the Eastern Indoor Soccer League. That was the last professional team for which he played.
