= Rob Ryerson =

American soccer player-coach (born 1964)

Personal information
- Full name: Robert Ryerson
- Date of birth: June 6, 1964 (age 62)
- Place of birth: Laurel, Maryland, United States
- Height: 6 ft 0 in (1.83 m)
- Position: Forward

College career
Years	Team	Apps	(Gls)
1983–1985	UNLV Rebels		

Senior career*
Years	Team	Apps	(Gls)
1986	San Diego Nomads		
1987	Baltimore Blast (indoor)		
1987	Washington Diplomats		
1988–1990	Maryland Bays		
1988–1991	Fort Wayne Flames (indoor)	26	(6)
1992	Tampa Bay Rowdies	1	(0)
1994–1995	Washington Warthogs (indoor)	42	(8)

International career
1988	United States	1	(1)

Managerial career
- 1991: UMBC Retrievers (assistant)
- 1993–1994: UNLV Rebels (assistant)
- 1996–1997: Washington Warthogs (assistant)
- 1997–1998: Baton Rouge Bombers
- 2000–2012: Mount St. Mary's Mountaineers
- * Club domestic league appearances and goals

Rob Ryerson is a retired U.S. soccer forward who played professionally, both indoor and outdoor soccer, for at least seven years. He last coached the Mount St. Mary's Mountaineers men's soccer program before it disbanded in 2012.

== Player ==
=== Youth ===
Rob Ryerson, along with his brother Rich, attended Oakland Mills High School where he played for the school's boys soccer team. He was selected as the Howard County "Player of the Year." He was also a high school All-American his senior year. Ryerson played four seasons of collegiate soccer while attending the University of Nevada, Las Vegas (UNLV). He was All Far West in 1983, 1984 and 1985. He was also the 1985 All Big West Player of the Year. He was a third team NSCAA All-American in 1984 and 1985 and a Soccer America Magazine first team All American in 1985. He holds the top two positions on the Big West season scoring record list with 21 goals (9 assists) in 1985 and 20 goals (7 assists) in 1984. He also scored 16 goals in 1983. He attained his degree and graduated from UNLV in 1988.

=== Professional ===
After leaving UNLV, Ryerson played the 1986 season with the San Diego Nomads of the Western Soccer Alliance. He was 5th on the alliance's goals list with six. In June 1986, the San Diego Sockers selected Ryerson in the first round of the Major Indoor Soccer League draft. He began the season on the Sockers' reserve team, but returned to UNLV to complete his undergraduate degree. Then in February 1987, he signed with the Baltimore Blast. The Sockers contested it and the league nullified the contract and awarded Ryerson's rights to the Sockers only to have the Sockers immediately waive Ryerson who then signed with the Blast. He never played a first team game with Baltimore before being released in October 1987. In the summer of 1987, Ryerson signed with the independent Washington Diplomats. In December 1987, Ryerson signed with the Maryland Bays of the American Soccer League. He was a 1988 ASL All Star and a member of the 1990 APSL championship Bays. In the fall of 1988, Ryerson signed with the Fort Wayne Flames of the American Indoor Soccer Association under coach and former Blast teammate Dave MacKenzie. Ryerson appeared in the final 26 games of the season, scored 6 goals and added 5 assists for 11 points. In 1992, he played 1 game for a total of 6 minutes with the Tampa Bay Rowdies in the American Professional Soccer League. In 1994, he played with the Washington Warthogs of the Continental Indoor Soccer League. In 1996, he became an assistant coach with the Warthogs.

=== National team ===
In 1988, he played his only full international match with the United States men's national soccer team. He scored the winning goal in a 1–0 victory over Costa Rica on June 14.

== Coach ==
In May 1991, Ryerson became an assistant coach with University of Maryland, Baltimore County. In 1993 and 1994, he served as an assistant with the UNLV Rebels soccer team. In 1995, he became the head coach of the DeMatha High School boys' soccer team. He also served as an assistant coach with the Washington Warthogs. In 1997, he became the head coach of the Baton Rouge Bombers of the Eastern Indoor Soccer League. He led the Bombers to the championship game, losing to the Lafayette Swampcats, and earning Coach of the Year honors. The EISL only lasted two seasons, folding in 1998. Ryerson then began collegiate coaching. Ryerson is the head coach of Mount Saint Mary's University soccer team since 2000. Ryerson was head coach of the 2004 Maryland Boys U/17 ODP.

He was selected to the UNLV Athletic Hall of Fame in 1998 and the school retired his jersey number (10). In 2006, he was inducted into the Maryland Soccer Hall of Fame.
