= Pensacola Flyers =

- Pensacola Flyers logo
- Full name: Pensacola Flyers
- Founded: 1997 (as Tupelo Hound Dogs)
- Dissolved: 1998
- Ground: Pensacola Civic Center; Pensacola, Florida
- Capacity: 8,150
- Owner: Dan and Lynn Broadway
- Head Coach: Jimmy Graham
- League: Eastern Indoor Soccer League

The Pensacola Flyers were an American professional indoor soccer team based in Pensacola, Florida. They played their home games in the Pensacola Civic Center. They were members of the Eastern Indoor Soccer League and played only during the 1998 season. During the 1997 season, the team played at the Tupelo Coliseum in Tupelo, Mississippi, as the Tupelo Hound Dogs then relocated to Pensacola during the offseason.

During their existence, the Flyers/Hound Dogs played a total of 52 games, winning 22, including one via shootout, and losing 30, including one via shootout. They scored a total of 675 goals and allowed a total of 732 goals and notched 66 total standings points out of a possible 156 points. (The EISL awarded 3 points for a win, 2 for a shootout win, 1 for a shootout loss, and 0 for a loss in regulation.)

The team suspended operations after the 1998 season, as did the Huntsville Fire, ultimately leading to the official collapse of the league in December 1998.

== History ==
=== 1997 season ===
1997 Tupelo Hound Dogs logo

The Tupelo Hound Dogs finished fifth overall in the seven-team league. Under the direction of head coach Jimmy Graham, they finished with a record of 12 wins (including 1 shootout win) and 12 losses for 35 points. The team was last in the league in attendance with an average of about 1,000 fans per game.

=== 1998 season ===
The Pensacola Flyers finished sixth overall in the seven-team league, ahead of only the Savannah Rug Ratz. They finished the season with a record of 10 wins and 18 losses (including 1 shootout loss) for 31 points. The Flyers averaged 2,164 fans per game, fifth-best in the EISL where the average league game saw 2,733 fans in attendance.

Oleg Baleev was named EISL Rookie of the Year for the 1998 season. Pensacola Flyers forward Brad Snyder was named to the 1998 EISL All-League Third Team. Players receiving All-League Honorable Mentions included midfielders Oleg Baleev and Diego Maradona.

== Former players ==
- Midfielder John Molet joined the Denver Dynamite of the Professional Arena Soccer League in October 2008.
- Oleg Baleyev is the head coach of the Jones County Junior College soccer team in Ellisville, Mississippi.
