= Irad (disambiguation) =

Irad can refer to:

- Irad, a Biblical name
- Irad, son of Enoch, a character in the Bible
- Irad, Kentucky
- Irad Young (born 1971), American-Israeli soccer player
- Arad, Iran, which has the alternative name "Irad"
- Independent research and development (IRAD), technical projects undertaken by US companies that are funded separately from their regulated government contracts
