= Mississippi Coast Coliseum =

Arena in Biloxi, Mississippi

- Mississippi Coast Coliseum & Convention Center

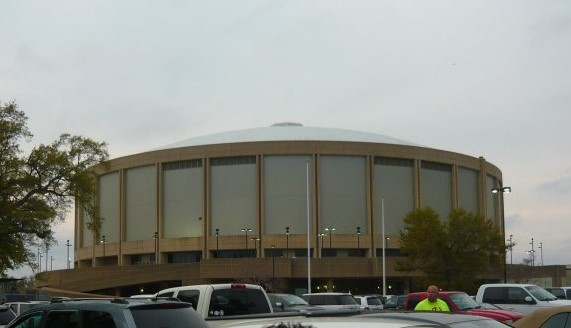

- Location within Mississippi Location within the United States
- Location: 2350 Beach Boulevard; Biloxi, Mississippi, 39531
- Coordinates: 30.3935°N 88.9746°W
- Owner: Mississippi Coast Coliseum Commission
- Operator: Mississippi Coast Coliseum Commission
- Capacity: 11,500 (concerts); 9,150 (ice hockey)
- Surface: Multi-surface
- Public transit: CTA

Construction
- Groundbreaking: 1975
- Opened: 1977
- Cost: $60 million (expansion)
- Architects: H F Fountain Jr & Associates

Tenants
- Mississippi Jets (CBA) (1987–1988); Mississippi Coast Sharks (GBA) (1992); Mississippi Sea Wolves (ECHL) (1996–2005, 2007–2009); Mississippi Beach Kings (EISL) (1998); Mississippi Fire Dogs (IPFL/NIFL) (1999–2002); Gulf Coast Bandits (WBA) (2005); Mississippi Surge (SPHL) (2009–2014)

The Mississippi Coast Coliseum & Convention Center is an 11,500-seat reserved seating, 15,000 festival seating, multi-purpose arena in Biloxi, Mississippi. It was built in 1977. It hosted the WCW Beach Blast in 1993 and the Sun Belt Conference men's basketball tournament in 1992 and 1993. The Metro Conference men's basketball tournaments were contested there in 1990 and 1994. In addition, the rematch between legendary boxing former world heavyweight champion Larry Holmes and his fellow former world heavyweight champion Mike Weaver was held at the Coast Coliseum on November 17, 2000; Holmes winning by sixth-round technical knockout.

Elvis Presley was set to perform at the grand opening, dying before the official opening. The first concert held at the Mississippi Coast Coliseum was by Charley Pride on November 18, 1977, while the first rock band to perform was Blue Öyster Cult on April 16, 1978. The Mississippi Coast Coliseum also holds one of the largest crawfish festivals in America. This event is held every year, over two weekends in April.

== Ice hockey ==
It was previously home to the Mississippi Sea Wolves (ECHL) ice hockey team. Due to damages to the arena by heavy flooding and winds from Hurricane Katrina in August 2005, the Sea Wolves cancelled their 2005–2006 and 2006–2007 seasons. Repairs were completed and the Sea Wolves returned to the ice on October 27, 2007. On March 30, 2009, the Sea Wolves announced they had suspended operations once again. However, the Coliseum was not without ice hockey entirely, as the Mississippi Surge announced its membership in the Southern Professional Hockey League and played at the Coliseum from 2009 to 2014.

In 2021, the Federal Prospects Hockey League hosted three neutral site games in Biloxi and an ownership group announced a new Sea Wolves team would begin playing in the 2022–23 season. The new organization gained an approval from the county board of supervisors for a two-year lease, pending league approval of the expansion team.

The Sea Wolves returned to play for the 2022–23 season at the coliseum. The team later changed its name to the Biloxi Breakers before folding in 2026.

== Basketball ==
It was home to the Gulf Coast Bandits, a basketball team that played in the World Basketball Association (WBA). The Bandits cancelled their 2006 season for the same reasons as the Sea Wolves and did not return in 2007. The Coliseum also hosted the Mississippi Jets of the Continental Basketball Association in 1988.

On October 13, 2013, the New Orleans Pelicans hosted the Atlanta Hawks in a preseason NBA game. Nearly 4,000 spectators came to the game, won by the Pelicans.

The coliseum hosted the 1990 and 1994 Metro Conference men's basketball tournament.

The Coliseum has also hosted matchups between Ole Miss and Southern Miss.

== Soccer ==
The Mississippi Beach Kings, under the leadership of general manager Roy Turner and coach Gary Hindley, went 18–10 during the 1998 season in the Eastern Indoor Soccer League. Hindley was voted coach of the year for the second-place finish. The Beach Kings won their first playoff series over the Huntsville Fire, two games to one, and lost the championship game to the regular-season champion Lafayette Swampcats, 10–9. The EISL folded the next year.

== Football ==
The Mississippi Fire Dogs of the National Indoor Football League also played at the arena, folding in 2003.

== Music ==
It also holds an annual rock festival, known to the locals as CPR FEST. It is presented by the local radio station 97.9 WCPR-FM. It consists of various popular rock artists. Such bands as Three Days Grace, Hinder, and Staind have performed at the event.

In 1999, Aaron Lewis & Fred Durst recorded live an acoustic version of Staind's song "Outside", during the Family Values Tour.

In May 2000, NSYNC launched their record-breaking No Strings Attached Tour at the Mississippi Coast Coliseum.

In 2007, Daughtry, Saliva, and Puddle of Mudd performed.

Taylor Swift performed in 2009.

Dolly Parton performed in 2010 as part of the Better Day World Tour.

Ozzy Osbourne, Mötley Crüe, Styx and Van Halen played here during the height of their success.

Depeche Mode have also performed at the venue during their Devotional World Tour.

Miranda Lambert has performed in the venue multiple times, most recently being during her Wildcard Tour in early 2020.

Guns N' Roses performed in the Coliseum on September 20, 2023, as part of their We're F'N' Back! Tour.

Dierks Bentley and Zach Top performed in the Coliseum on August 23, 2025, as part of Bentley's Broken Branches Tour.

== Wrestling ==
WWE has held many events, including WWE Smackdown and WWE Raw. It has also held many house shows, and in September 2013, it held Monday Night Raw for the first time in 8 years. SmackDown comes about once a year.
