= Todd Dusosky =

American soccer player, wrestler

Personal information
- Date of birth: May 12, 1976 (age 50)
- Place of birth: Anoka, Minnesota, U.S.
- Height: 6 ft 1 in (1.85 m)
- Position: Forward

College career
| Years | Team | Apps | (Gls) |
| 1994 | Viterbo V-Hawks | | |

Senior career*
| Years | Team | Apps | (Gls) |
| 1995–1996 | Cleveland Crunch (indoor) | 50 | (19) |
| 1996–2007 | Milwaukee Wave (indoor) | 343 | (250) |
| 1996–1997 | Minnesota Thunder | | (8) |
| 1998 | Lafayette SwampCats (indoor) | 26 | (36) |
| 2000 | Milwaukee Rampage | 9 | (3) |
| 2003–2004 | Milwaukee Wave United | 49 | (21) |

International career
| 1998–? | U.S. Futsal | | |
- * Club domestic league appearances and goals

Todd Dusosky (born May 12, 1976) is an American retired soccer forward who spent most of his career with indoor teams. He also played a handful of seasons in the USL A-League.

== Soccer ==
Dusosky graduated from Anoka High School in 1994. After spending one year attending Viterbo College in La Crosse, Wisconsin, he turned professional. In 1995, he began his career with the Cleveland Crunch of the National Professional Soccer League. That season the Crunch won the league championship as Dusosky was named a second team All Star. He then began the 1996–1997 season in Cleveland, but on December 26, 1996, the Crunch sent Dusosky and several other players, to the Milwaukee Wave in exchange for Matt Knowles. During his years with the Wave, he played every winter indoor season with the team in addition to playing indoors or outdoors with other teams during the summer seasons. During his twelve years with Milwaukee, Dusosky has won four championships (1998, 2000, 2001, 2005), been named the 2005 MISL Finals MVP and the 2006 All Star Game MVP. He is also a three time MISL All Star. He has been plagued with injuries over the last few years, losing half of the 2004–2005 season and most of 2007–2008. In 1997, Dunosky spent the summer with the Minnesota Thunder of the A-League. On May 29, 1998, he signed with the Lafayette SwampCats of the Eastern Indoor Soccer League. The Swamp Cats won the league title and Dusosky led the league in scoring. On March 20, 2000, he signed a two-year contract with the Milwaukee Rampage of the USL A-League. He spent that season with the Thunder, but did not return in 2001. In 2003, he signed with the Milwaukee Wave United an USL A-League affiliate of the Milwaukee Wave. United played two seasons before folding.

== Futsal ==
Between 1998 and 1999, he earned five caps with the United States national futsal team. He continued to play for the Futsal team through the 2004 FIFA Futsal World Cup, but his total number of caps is unknown.

== Professional wrestling ==
In addition to his soccer career, Dusosky and his twin brother Troy were professional wrestlers known as The Super Ds in the NWF Kids Pro Wrestling's lightweight division. The brothers were the promotion's first Lightweight Tag Team Champions when the title was introduced on April 15, 1985. They held the belts for over a month before dropping them to the team of Rough Ryan and Mean Dean on May 25. On February 15 the following year, they regained the title by defeating Rough Ryan and Invader I. On May 9, they lost the title belts to The Rough Russians but won them back in a rematch on July 26. Their final reign ended when their mother refused to allow them to compete due to an upcoming soccer tournament. They were stripped of the championship on October 18, 1986, and the belts were awarded to The Blade Runners by forfeit. They were scheduled for a title shot inside a steel cage against The Blade Runners in February 1987 as part of the NWF's "Star Cage '87" but the event was scrapped in early January of that year.

== Championships and accomplishments ==
- National Wrestling Federation: Kids Pro Wrestling
  - NWF:KPW Lightweight Tag Team Championship (3 times) - with Troy Dusosky
