= Gary Hindley =

American soccer coach (born 1947)

Personal information
- Date of birth: May 8, 1947 (age 79)
- Place of birth: United States
- Position: Goalkeeper

College career
Years	Team	Apps	(Gls)
1965–1968	Trenton State Lions		

Managerial career
- 1970–1974: Middlebury Panthers (assistant)
- 1974–1981: Trenton State Lions
- 1982–1983: Pennsylvania Stoners (assistant)
- 1983–1986: Los Angeles Lazers (assistant)
- 1984–1985: Houston Dynamos
- 1986: Memphis Storm
- 1986–1987: Los Angeles Lazers (assistant)
- 1987–1988: Chicago Sting (assistant)
- 1988: Chicago Sting
- 1989–1990: Orlando Lions
- 1991: Maryland Bays
- 1992–1995: Cleveland Crunch
- 1995–1996: Cincinnati Silverbacks
- 1996–1997: Buffalo Blizzard
- 1998: Mississippi Beach Kings
- 2000–2001: Toronto ThunderHawks

Gary Hindley (born May 8, 1947) is an American soccer coach. He has coached youth soccer, high school, college and professional teams. He won Coach of the Year honors in 1984 in the United Soccer League, 1991 American Professional Soccer League and 1998 (Eastern Indoor Soccer League). He won the 1993-94 National Professional Soccer League championship with the Cleveland Crunch. His overall coaching record in professional, collegiate and scholastic soccer is 433-307-28 (.585).

== Player ==
In 1965, Hindley graduated from Wall High School in Wall Township, New Jersey, where he was the first captain of the boys' soccer program team. In 2002, he was inducted into the Wall High School Hall of Fame and enshrined in the school's Soccer Hall of Fame in 2009. He then attended Trenton State College (now called the College of New Jersey), where he played on the men's soccer team from 1965 to 1968. In 1965, Hindley and his teammates won the NAIA national men's soccer championship, finishing runner up in 1966. In addition to his four-year soccer career, Hindley spent one season on both the basketball and gymnastics teams and three seasons as an infielder on the baseball team. He graduated in 1969 with a bachelor's degree in education and earned his master's degree in 1970. He was inducted into the school's Athletic Hall of Fame in 2008. He played briefly in the American Soccer League in 1969 and 1971.

== Coach ==
In 1970, Hindley became an assistant coach at Middlebury College. In 1974, Trenton State College hired Hindley to coach both the men's soccer and baseball teams. He spent eight seasons at Trenton State, compiling a 92-48-12 record with the soccer team and a 134-123-4 record with the baseball team. In 1982, he left Trenton State to become an assistant coach with the Pennsylvania Stoners of the American Soccer League. At the end of the 1983 season, Hindley was hired as an assistant coach with the Los Angeles Lazers of the Major Indoor Soccer League. In 1984, Hindley became head coach of the Houston Dynamos of the United Soccer League. He took the Dynamos to the championship game, losing to the Fort Lauderdale Sun. Hindley was named the USL Coach of the Year. In 1985, the Dynamo withdrew from the USL and played as an independent team under Hindley's direction. In 1986, the expansion Memphis Storm of the American Indoor Soccer Association hired Hindley as the team's first head coach. The Storm fired him on Dec. 9, 1986 after a 3–6 start. He then returned to the Lazers where he remained until hired by the Chicago Sting as an assistant coach on Jan. 14, 1987. On Feb. 22, 1988, the Sting fired Erich Geyer and elevated Hindley to head coach. The Sting withdrew from the league and folded after the season. Hindley remained in Chicago where he ran youth soccer camps. In February 1989, the Orlando Lions of the American Soccer League hired Hindley. In 1990, the ASL merged with the Western Soccer League to form the American Professional Soccer League. Hindley and the Lions played the 1990 season in the new league. When the Lions merged with the Fort Lauderdale Strikers in January 1991, the combined team released Hindley who then signed with the Maryland Bays on March 15, 1991. Hindley took the Bays to the top of the league standings and was named the 1991 APSL Coach of the Year. The Bays folded during the off-season and Hindley ran soccer camps in Florida until hired by the Cleveland Crunch of the National Professional Soccer League on Sept. 30, 1992. He guided Cleveland to playoff series wins over the Buffalo Blizzard and Harrisburg Heat before losing the championship to the Kansas City Attack in the final game of a five-game series. In 1994, Hindley coached the American Conference in the NPSL All-Star Game, then took the Crunch to the NPSL championship, defeating Buffalo and Harrisburg and beating the St. Louis Ambush, three games to one for the title. Hindley's contract with the Crunch ended in 1995 and on April 19, 1995, he was hired by the expansion Cincinnati Silverbacks. In September 1996, he moved to coach the Buffalo Blizzard. The team fired him in March 1997. In February 1998, he became head coach of the Mississippi Beach Kings of the Eastern Indoor Soccer League. He was the 1998 EISL Coach of the Year. Both the Beach Kings and the EISL folded at the end of the season. On Nov. 10, 2000, he was named head coach of the expansion Toronto ThunderHawks of the NPSL. His overall record as a head coach in 14 seasons at the professional level was 433–305–30. In February 2002, Hindley was named Director of Coaching and Player Development for the Knoxville Football Club. In 2008, he moved to the Bay United Soccer Club in Panama City, Florida as coaching advisor and goalkeeper coach.

=== Referee ===
Hindley was a much noted referee for nearly 25 years and assigned some of the highest level games. As a noted member of the NISOA National Ref Program, he had consistent requests to work the ACC Tournament finals, NCAA and NAIA tournament contests, and as a center for the HS Final Four in Florida. In 1991, he was selected by the Florida Intercollegiate Soccer Coaches Association as the Referee of the Year.

=== High school ===
From 2009 until 2014, Hindley was head coach of both the boys and girls varsity teams at 1A Port St. Joe High School in Florida. His inexperienced squads compiled a 91-54-13 (.627) record overall with tournament successes at the District and Regional levels of the Florida State Championship series. Since 2018, he has stayed active by coaching the Gulfview HS (Naples, FL) boys for one season and Marco Island (FL) Middle School girls for two seasons, compiling a 14-11-0 (.560) record and one league championship.
