= Beach Blast (1993) =

1993 World Championship Wrestling pay-per-view event

- VHS cover showing Big Van Vader, Sid Vicious (back) Davey Boy Smith, and Sting (front)
- Promotion: World Championship Wrestling
- Date: July 18, 1993
- City: Biloxi, Mississippi
- Venue: Mississippi Coast Coliseum
- Attendance: 8,600
- Buy rate: 100,000
- Tagline: A Day At The Beach, A Night For Revenge

Pay-per-view chronology
| ← Previous; Slamboree | Next → Fall Brawl |

Beach Blast chronology
| ← Previous; 1992 | Next → Final |

The 1993 Beach Blast was the second and final Beach Blast professional wrestling pay-per-view (PPV) event produced by World Championship Wrestling (WCW). It took place on July 18, 1993, at the Mississippi Coast Coliseum in Biloxi, Mississippi. In the main event the team billed as "the Superpowers" (Sting and Davey Boy Smith) faced a team nicknamed "the Masters of the Power Bomb" (Big Van Vader and Sid Vicious) as part of a longer running rivalry between the two sides.

WCW closed in 2001 and all rights to their television and PPV shows were bought by WWE, including the Beach Blast shows.

== Production ==
=== Background ===
In 1992 the Atlanta, Georgia based World Championship Wrestling (WCW) professional wrestling promotion increased their pay-per-view (PPV) shows from five in 1991 to six in 1992. As part of the expansion WCW came up with the concept of "Beach Blast", a summer show featuring a beach theme, complete with surfers, women in bikinis and an entrance set created to resemble a beach. In 1993 the Beach Blast show was moved to July and replaced the Great American Bash that WCW usually held in July. In 1994 the show was renamed Bash at the Beach, keeping the general theme of the summer event. In 2014 the show became available on the WWE Network, initially with some of the theme songs originally used being replaced with generic music, notably the entrance music for Sting and the Steiner Brothers composed by Jimmy Papa. In March 2014 the WWE restored the original music after an unsuccessful lawsuit by the composer.

=== Storylines ===
The event featured wrestlers from pre-existing scripted feuds and storylines. Wrestlers portrayed villains, heroes, or less distinguishable characters in the scripted events that built tension and culminated in a wrestling match or series of matches.

WCW produced a mini-movie centered around the four participants in the main event Sting and Davey Boy Smith (nicknamed "the Superpowers", playing off the fact that Sting was American and Smith was British) facing the team of Big Van Vader and Sid Vicious (dubbed "The Masters of the Power Bomb", based on the fact that both wrestlers used a power bomb as their finishing move). The mini-movie depicted Sting and Davey Boy Smith on a tropical island with a group of kids. As they were playing with the kids Vader, Vicious and their managers Harley Race and Col. Robert Parker approaches them, offering them a bribe to not wrestle at Beach Blast. The Superpowers turn the bribe down, which lead the villainous duo of Vader and Vicious to hire a midget to swim out to their boat, with a fake shark fin on his back and plant a bomb. At the last moment Smith saves Sting from being blown up, vowing revenge at Beach Blast.

== Aftermath ==
This was the last WCW Pay Per View that featured the NWA World Heavyweight Championship. Ric Flair was booked to lose the title to Rick Rude at the next PPV, Fall Brawl, but the NWA Board of Directors stepped in and said the title could not change hands without their approval, so WCW withdrew from the NWA two weeks before Fall Brawl and Flair was stripped of the title, which would later become the WCW International World Heavyweight Championship. The NWA would hold a tournament, partnering with Eastern Championship Wrestling in 1994 to fill the vacant title, which would result in Shane Douglas throwing down the NWA world title and becoming the first ECW World Champion.

This was also the final appearance of the NWA World Tag Team Championship on a WCW PPV. The titles were won by Arn Anderson and Paul Roma in August 1993 at Clash of Champions XXIV, then WCW withdrew from the NWA in September 1993, and the titles would no longer be defended together; the NWA did not fill the vacancy for nearly two years; finally having a tournament in July 1995, which was won by the Rock 'n' Roll Express.

Other on-screen personnel
| Role: | Name: |
|---|---|
| Commentators | Tony Schiavone |
| Commentators | Jesse Ventura |
| Interviewers | Missy Hyatt |
| Interviewers | Eric Bischoff |
| Ring announcer | Gary Michael Cappetta |
| Referees | Randy Anderson |
| Referees | Nick Patrick |

== Home video and streaming ==
The event was released on VHS in the United Kingdom by Turner Home Entertainment in 1994. The event was edited down to two hours and the first three matches were not included on the tape.

In 2014, the event was included on the WWE's streaming platform the WWE Network as part of its launch and remained on the service until the platform closed in 2026. In June 2025, the WWE uploaded the event to their WCW YouTube channel, for free streaming.

== Results ==
| No. | Results | Stipulations | Times |
|---|---|---|---|
| 1 | Paul Orndorff (c) defeated Ron Simmons by disqualification | No Disqualification match for the WCW World Television Championship | 11:15 |
| 2 | 2 Cold Scorpio and Marcus Alexander Bagwell defeated Tex Slazenger and Shanghai Pierce | Tag team match | 12:48 |
| 3 | Lord Steven Regal (with Sir William Dundee) defeated Erik Watts | Singles match | 07:31 |
| 4 | Johnny B. Badd defeated Maxx Payne | Singles match | 04:50 |
| 5 | The Hollywood Blonds (Brian Pillman and Steve Austin) (c) defeated Arn Anderson and Paul Roma | Tag team match for the WCW World Tag Team Championship | 26:14 |
| 6 | Dustin Rhodes vs. Rick Rude ended in a draw (1–1) | Iron Man Challenge for the vacant WCW United States Heavyweight Championship | 30:00 |
| 7 | Ric Flair defeated Barry Windham (c) | Singles match for the NWA World Heavyweight Championship | 11:15 |
| 8 | Sting and Davey Boy Smith defeated Big Van Vader and Sid Vicious (with Harley Race and Col. Robert Parker) | Tag team match | 16:44 |
(c) / – the champion(s) heading into the match

=== Iron Man Challenge ===
| Score | | Point winner | Decision | Notes | Time |
|---|---|---|---|---|---|
| Rhodes | Rude | Point winner | Decision | Notes | Time |
| 0 | 1 | Rick Rude | Pinfall | Rude pinned Rhodes after the Rude Awakening | 13:19 |
| 1 | 1 | Dustin Rhodes | Pinfall | Rhodes pinned Rude after a running bulldog | 26:56 |
