= Troy Dusosky =

American soccer player, wrestler (born 1976)

Personal information
- Date of birth: May 12, 1976 (age 50)
- Place of birth: Anoka, Minnesota, U.S.
- Height: 6 ft 1 in (1.85 m)
- Position: Defender

College career
Years	Team	Apps	(Gls)
1994	Viterbo V-Hawks		

Senior career*
Years	Team	Apps	(Gls)
1995–2001	Cleveland Crunch (indoor)	165	(54)
1998	Lafayette SwampCats (indoor)		
1999	Cincinnati Riverhawks	7	(0)
2001– 2011	Milwaukee Wave (indoor)	257	(109)
2003–2004	Milwaukee Wave United	39	(0)
- * Club domestic league appearances and goals

Troy Dusosky (born May 12, 1976) is a retired American soccer defender who played for the Milwaukee Wave of the Major Indoor Soccer League. Over his career, he has played primarily indoor soccer with a handful of seasons in the USL A-League. He also briefly worked as a professional wrestler.

== Soccer ==
Dusosky graduated from Anoka High School in 1994. After spending one year attending Viterbo College in La Crosse, Wisconsin, he turned professional. In 1995, he signed a developmental contract with Cleveland Crunch of the National Professional Soccer League. However, he still saw time in 20 first team games as the Crunch won the league championship. Dusosky and his teammates repeated as champions in 1999. In September 2001, the Crunch traded Dusosky to the Milwaukee Wave in exchange for Jim Larkin. He lost over half the 2004–2005 season after tearing his anterior cruciate ligament. While he played twenty-five games in the 2005–2006 season, he was forced to have surgery and did not return to playing until December 2006.

During his indoor career, Dusosky would also occasionally play indoor or outdoor soccer during the summer season. In 1998, he played for the Lafayette SwampCats of the Eastern Indoor Soccer League. The Swamp Cats won the league title. In 1999, he played for the Cincinnati Riverhawks in USL A-League. In 2003, he signed with the Milwaukee Wave United an USL A-League affiliate of the Milwaukee Wave. United played two seasons before folding.

Dusosky retired in December 2011. At the time of his retirement, he was tenth on the list of career Wave games played (257), ninth in assists (92), seventh in 3-point goals (16), sixth in blocks (320) and first in penalty minutes (185). He was All Pro in 2001–02, 2002–03 and 2008–09. He was also an All Star in 2002, 2003, 2004 and 2006. During his ten years with the Wave, the team won three championships.

== Futsal ==
Dusosky played for the United States national futsal team at the 2007 Pan American Games. He scored two goals as the U.S. finished fifth.

== Professional wrestling ==
In addition to his soccer career, Dusosky and his twin brother Todd were a professional wrestlers known as The Super Ds in the NWF Kids Pro Wrestling's lightweight division. The brothers were the promotion's first Lightweight Tag Team Champions when the title was introduced on April 15, 1985. They held the belts for over a month before dropping them to the team of Rough Ryan and Mean Dean on May 25. On February 15 the following year, they regained the title by defeating Rough Ryan and Invader I. On May 9, they lost the title belts to The Rough Russians but won them back in a rematch on July 26. Their final reign ended when their mother refused to allow them to compete due to an upcoming soccer tournament. They were stripped of the championship on October 18, 1986, and the belts were awarded to The Blade Runners by forfeit. They were scheduled for a title shot inside a steel cage against The Blade Runners in February 1987 as part of the NWF's "Star Cage '87" but the event was scrapped in early January of that year.

== Championships and accomplishments ==
- National Wrestling Federation: Kids Pro Wrestling
  - NWF:KPW Lightweight Tag Team Championship (3 times) - with Todd Dusosky
