= Manager of the Month =

Manager of the Month may refer to:

== English football ==
First tier:

- Premier League Manager of the Month

Second Tier

- Football League First Division Manager of the Month (1992-2004)
- Football League Championship Manager of the Month (2004-current)

Third Tier

- Football League Second Division Manager of the Month (1992-2004)
- Football League One Manager of the Month (2004-current)

Fourth Tier

- Football League Third Division Manager of the Month (1992-2004)
- Football League Two Manager of the Month (2004-current)

== Scottish football ==
- List of Scottish Premier League monthly award winners
- Scottish Football League monthly awards, including those for manager

== Irish football ==
- League of Ireland Premier Division Manager of the Month

== Spanish football ==
- La Liga Manager of the Month
- Segunda División Manager of the Month
