= Baton Rouge Bombers =

- Baton Rouge Bombers Logo
- Full name: Baton Rouge Bombers
- Founded: 1997
- Dissolved: 1998
- Ground: Baton Rouge River Center Arena; Baton Rouge, Louisiana
- Capacity: 8,900
- Owners: Thomas Galloway; Wayne Elmore
- President: Steve Carter
- Head Coach: Rob Ryerson
- League: Eastern Indoor Soccer League

The Baton Rouge Bombers were an American professional indoor soccer team based in Baton Rouge, Louisiana. The Bombers played in the Eastern Indoor Soccer League during both of the league's seasons from 1997 to 1998. They played their home games in the Baton Rouge River Center Arena. The team shut down after the EISL collapsed in late December 1998.

During their existence, the Bombers played a total of 52 regular season games, winning 32, one via shootout, and losing 20, one via shootout. They scored a total of 689 goals and allowed a total of 566 goals and amassed 96 total standings points out of a possible 156 points. (The EISL awarded 3 standings points for a win, 2 for a shootout win, 1 for a shootout loss, and 0 for a loss in regulation.) The Bombers made the playoffs both years of their existence and played for the league championship in 1997.

Connected to the Bombers by proximity, common ownership, and Interstate 10, the Lafayette SwampCats were the chief rivals of the Baton Rouge Bombers throughout the league's short history. More than half of Baton Rouge's regular season losses were to Lafayette and both of the Bombers' playoff losses were to the SwampCats.

== History ==
=== 1997 season ===
The team's artificial turf did not arrive until one week before the team's inaugural home opener because the manufacturer, Tech Turf of Georgia, accidentally destroyed the turf they originally manufactured for the Bombers. The regular season ran from June through August 1997 with the playoffs taking place in early September.

The Bombers finished second overall in the seven-team league. They finished the season with a record of 16 wins and 8 losses (including 1 shootout loss) for a total of 49 standings points. (The EISL awarded 3 points for a win, 2 for a shootout win, 1 for a shootout loss, and 0 for a loss in regulation.)

The team reached the playoffs where they beat the Tallahassee Scorpions 23–16 in the semi-finals. The Bombers lost to the Lafayette SwampCats 12–9 in the inaugural EISL championship game. Head coach Rob Ryerson was named the EISL Coach of the Year for the 1997 season. Irad Young was selected as the Bombers' Most Valuable Player and named to the 1997 EISL All-League Second Team.

=== 1998 season ===
In May 1998, head coach Rob Ryerson signed his younger (by 11 months) brother Rich Ryerson as a defender for the upcoming season. The 1998 regular season ran from late May through mid August 1998 with the playoffs taking place in late August. The team averaged 3,004 fans per game over their 14 home games in the 1998 regular season, third-best in the league.

On the field, the Bombers finished fourth overall in the seven-team league. They finished the season with a record of 16 wins (including 1 shootout win) and 12 losses for a total of 47 standings points. The Bombers made the playoffs, losing to the Lafayette SwampCats 2 games to 0 in the semi-final round.

Rich Ryerson was named EISL Defensive Player of the Year for the 1998 season. Baton Rouge Bombers players named to the 1998 EISL All-League Second Team included defender Rich Ryerson and midfielder Olivier Grava. Players named to the EISL All-League Third Team included goalkeeper Dave Tenney. Players receiving All-League Honorable Mentions included midfielders Doug Smith and Irad Young plus forward Renato Sampaio.

Head coach Rob Ryerson announced he was leaving the Bombers due to "philosophical differences over business decisions" just days after the team's exit from the playoffs, a move later made moot when the league shut down in late December.

== Former players ==
- Todd Haskins
- Rich Ryerson
- Irad Young
