= Terry Rowe =

English footballer (born 1964)

Personal information
- Full name: Norman Terence Sinclair Rowe
- Date of birth: 8 June 1964 (age 62)
- Place of birth: Fulham, England
- Positions: Midfielder; defender

Youth career
- Fulham

Senior career*
Years	Team	Apps	(Gls)
1981–1984	Brentford	66	(1)
1984–1992	Wichita Wings (indoor)	292	(55)
1991–1993	Tampa Bay Rowdies	38	(0)
1993	Dayton Dynamo (indoor)	6	(2)
1994–1995	Detroit Neon (indoor)	49	(15)
1995	→ Chertsey Town (loan)		
1996–1997	Indianapolis Twisters (indoor)		
1997	Anaheim Splash (indoor)		
1997–1999	Wichita Wings (indoor)	30	(21)
- * Club domestic league appearances and goals

Norman Terence Sinclair Rowe (born 8 June 1964) is an English retired professional footballer. He spent three seasons in the American Professional Soccer League, eight in the Major Indoor Soccer League, four in the Continental Indoor Soccer League and two in the National Professional Soccer League.

== Playing career ==
After a spell with Fulham as a junior, Rowe began his career in the Brentford youth team when he was fifteen. He turned professional with Brentford and became the first black player to make a senior appearance for the club. Rowe played 81 games before a change of managers saw him demoted to the reserves. In 1984, after moves to Wimbledon and Sunderland fell through, scouts from the Wichita Wings of the Major Indoor Soccer League approached him and he moved to the United States. He remained with the Wings until 1990. On 6 July 1990, he signed a one-year contract with the Cleveland Crunch. However, in September, he discovered that the move to Cleveland voided his work visa and he returned to the Wings. In February 1991, he signed with the Tampa Bay Rowdies of the American Professional Soccer League. He finished the MISL season with Wichita, then joined the Rowdies in April. In August 1991, he rejoined the Wings for the 1991–1992 MISL season, then was back with the Rowdies in the summer of 1992. This season the Rowdies went to the APSL championship game before losing to the Colorado Foxes. By this time, the MISL had collapsed and the Wings moved to the National Professional Soccer League. The move led to a complete revamping of their roster and Rowe was not offered a contract. He returned to England to seek a new team there, but returned to the United States after Terry Nicholl, ex-coach of the Wings asked him to come play for the Dayton Dynamo which Nicholl was now coaching in the NPSL. He played only one month with Dayton before returning to England for a trial with Cambridge F.C. However, he was back with the Rowdies for the 1993 season. He was named team captain, but injures marred his season and he played only eleven games. In 1994, he signed with the Detroit Neon in the Continental Indoor Soccer League. He spent the 1994 and 1995 seasons in Detroit (returning to England between the seasons to play for non-league side Chertsey Town) and received offers from Peterborough United, Brighton & Hove Albion and Walsall in England, but remained committed to indoor football in the United States due to financial considerations. Rowe moved to the Indianapolis Twisters for the 1996 season. He began the 1997 season with the Twisters before being traded in July, along with Rich Ryerson to the Anaheim Splash in exchange for Paul McDonnell and a 1998 first-round draft pick. On 16 October 1997, Rowe signed a short-term contract with the Wings. He played five games, then left to play for an English team. He returned to the Wings in July 1998.

== Coaching career ==
Rowe has held coaching roles at Chertsey Town and at Peterborough youth club P&T Panthers.

== Personal life ==
Rowe appears in the 1984 Minder episode The Long Ride Back to Scratchwood, filmed at Griffin Park.
