= Irad Young =

Israeli-American soccer player

Irad Young עירד יאנג
Personal information
- Full name: Irad Young
- Date of birth: 25 March 1971 (age 55)
- Place of birth: Israel
- Height: 5 ft 7 in (1.70 m)
- Position: Midfielder

Youth career
- 1989–1993: George Mason Patriots

Senior career*
Years	Team	Apps	(Gls)
1993–1994	Hapoel Haifa		
1994–1995	Washington Warthogs (indoor)	23	(7)
1996	Reading Rage	?	(1)
1997–1998	Baton Rouge Bombers (indoor)		
2008–2010	Northern Virginia Royals	28	(0)
- British Tigers F.C.
- * Club domestic league appearances and goals

Irad Young (Hebrew: עירד יאנג; born 25 March 1971) is a retired Israeli-American professional football (soccer) player. Playing for George Mason University he set the school's career assist record. After college he played for Hapoel Haifa, the Washington Warthogs, and the Baton Rouge Bombers.

== Playing career ==
Irad Young began his playing career as a youth in New York. He lived in Baldwin, New York, and Syosset, New York. In 1988 he was named Nassau County Player of the Year. He was a member of the United States U-16, U-18 US National Team. Young graduated from Syosset High School where he was an NSCAA First Team High School All American and a Parade Magazine All-America soccer player. Syosset reached the New York State high school championship, losing in overtime, during Young's senior season. He holds the school's career record of 54 goals.

After high school, Young attended George Mason University on a full scholarship where he earned All-Conference Honors in 1990 and 1992, All-Virginia, and All-South Atlantic Region, and was inducted into the GMU Soccer Hall of Fame in 2012. During his senior year, he assisted fellow Israeli Tamir Linhart, to help his 13th nationally ranked GMU team defeat No. 1 ranked University of Virginia 2–0. This assist broke the school's career assist record (20), and tied the single season record (9). Young also became the first GMU player to notch 20 goals and 20 assists.

During his senior year in college, Young was signed by professional soccer club Hapoel Haifa from the Israel Premier League, the same club his father Roby Young captained and starred throughout the 1960s. Irad played with Hapoel during the 1993–94 Liga Leumit season. His best game came in Romania against FC Petrolul Ploiești, where he was named Man of the Match assisting on all three goals for a shocking 3–0 win against the European powerhouse.

After his time in Israel, Young joined the American team who drafted him out of college, the Washington Warthogs of the Continental Indoor Soccer League in 1994. Young spent two seasons with the Warthogs recording 11 goals and 22 assists.

On July 30, 1997, Young signed with the short-lived Baton Rouge Bombers of the Eastern Indoor Soccer League. During the team's two years of existence, Young led the league in assists both seasons, leading the Bombers to two championship finals. Young was a two-time EISL All Star, and was runner-up for League MVP in 1997. Young retired from professional soccer to focus on his graduate degree.

== Coach ==
Young is a professional soccer scout for a number of Major League Soccer (MLS) clubs, as well as international clubs in Israel and Europe. He is also a youth and collegiate soccer coach in the Los Angeles area. Prior to Los Angeles, Irad was a youth soccer coach in the Washington DC area. He has coached the Herndon Arsenal, BRYC Nighthawks, Springfield Youth Club Jr. Royals, and Herndon Real Jr. to VA state championships. Young was named Virginia State Coach of the Year in 2001 after taking the Nighthawks to 16th in the US, the Arsenal to 12th in the US, and the Oakton High School Cougars to the state finals.
