= Beach Blast =

- Promotions: World Championship Wrestling
- First event: Beach Blast (1992)
- Last event: Beach Blast (1993)

Beach Blast was a professional wrestling pay-per-view (PPV) event promoted by World Championship Wrestling (WCW) and held in the summers of 1992 and 1993. The 1992 WCW Beach Blast PPV event was held in June on a Saturday, while the 1993 WCW Beach Blast PPV event was held in July on a Sunday. It was replaced by Bash at the Beach in 1994. WCW closed in 2001, and all rights to their television and PPV shows were bought by WWE, including the Beach Blast shows. With the launch of the WWE Network in 2014, the 1992 and 1993 Beach Blast shows became available on demand for network subscribers.

== Dates, venues, and main events ==
Event	Date	City	Venue	Main events	Ref
Beach Blast (1992)	June 20, 1992	Mobile, Alabama	Mobile Civic Center	The Steiner Brothers (Rick Steiner & Scott Steiner) (c) vs. Terry Gordy & Steve Williams for the WCW World Tag Team Championship	
Beach Blast (1993)	July 18, 1993	Biloxi, Mississippi	Mississippi Coast Coliseum	Sting & Davey Boy Smith vs. The Masters of the Powerbomb (Big Van Vader & Sid Vicious)	
(c) – refers to the champion(s) heading into the match
