= Pensacola Bay Center =

Indoor arena in Florida, U.S.

Coordinates: 30.416485°N 87.209372°W

- The Hangar (for hockey)

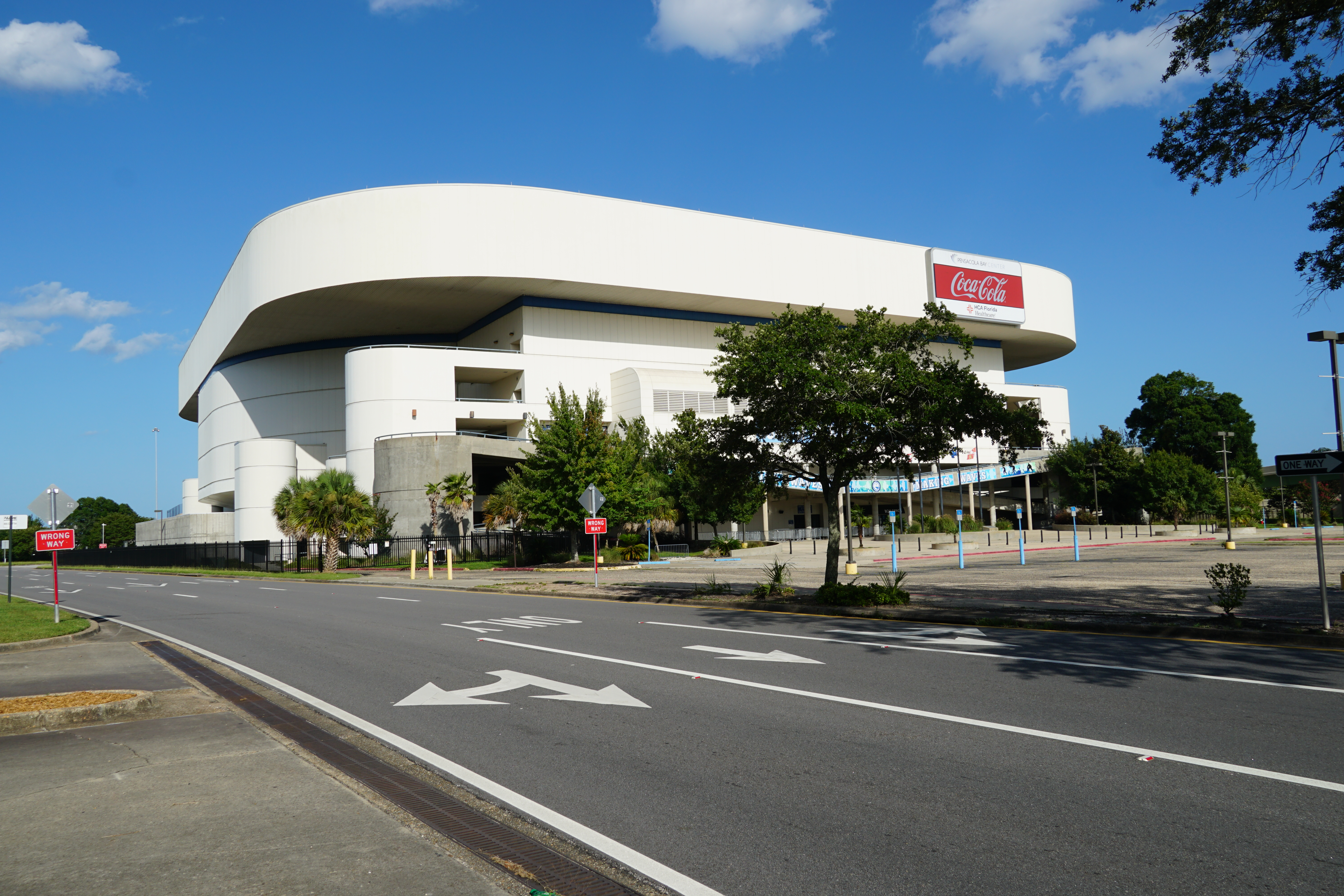

- Location within Florida Location within the United States
- Former names: Pensacola Civic Center (1985–2012)
- Location: 201 East Gregory Street; Pensacola, Florida 32502
- Owner: Escambia County
- Operator: ASM Global
- Capacity: 10,000 (8,082 for hockey)
- Surface: 200' x 85' (hockey)

Construction
- Groundbreaking: 1983
- Opened: January 21, 1985
- Cost: $20.5 million ($61.4 million in 2025 dollars)
- Architect: Lindley Renken
- General contractors: Dyson Construction, LLC.

Tenants
- Pensacola Tornados (CBA) (1985–1991); Pensacola HotShots (GBA) (1992); Pensacola Ice Pilots (ECHL) (1996–2008); Pensacola Flyers (EISL) (1998); Pensacola Barracudas (AF2) (2000–2002); Pensacola Ice Flyers (SPHL) (2009–present)

Pensacola Bay Center (formerly Pensacola Civic Center) is an indoor arena located in Pensacola, Florida. It is owned by Escambia County and operated by Legends Global. The Bay Center has a capacity of 8,082 for hockey games, and as much as 10,000 for non-hockey events. The arena contains 23,000 square feet (2,100 m^{2}) of space and 10,000 square feet (1,000 m^{2}) of meeting space.

The Escambia County Commission voted to rename the arena the Pensacola Bay Center on October 18, 2012, as part of a citywide rebranding effort begun by Pensacola mayor Ashton Hayward.

== Sporting events ==
The Bay Center opened in January 1985. Beginning in the fall of 1996, it was used primarily as the home of the Pensacola Ice Pilots hockey team until the team's exit from the ECHL on June 23, 2008. Hockey returned to the Civic Center, however, in fall 2009 when the Pensacola Ice Flyers of the Southern Professional Hockey League began play. Other minor professional teams have used the Civic Center as its home. From 2000 to 2002, the Pensacola Barracudas played in the af2.The Pensacola Tornados of the Continental Basketball Association (CBA) played at the Civic Center from 1985 to 1991. In 1998, the Pensacola Flyers of the Eastern Indoor Soccer League played for one season. Various sporting events have taken place at PBC, including wrestling and rodeos. WCW hosted their November 1993 pay-per-view event Battlebowl at the Civic Center. It has also been the multiple-time home of the U.S. Roller Skating National Championships. Additionally, the Bay Center has served as the host venue of the Sun Belt Conference men's and women's basketball tournaments since 2021.

== Concerts ==
Bon Jovi performed to the arena's largest crowd ever for a concert on February 4, 1989, as part of their Jersey Syndicate Tour.

On February 27, 1990, Janet Jackson opened her Rhythm Nation World Tour in Pensacola. The tour's dress rehearsal at the Pensacola Civic Center issued 7,600 tickets to the public as a benefit to local charity, which sold out in less than an hour.

KISS was the first band to perform at the arena, and continues to make Pensacola a destination on its North American tours.

Perhaps the biggest concert ever at the Pensacola Bay Center never took place. Michael Jackson used the venue to rehearse for his Bad World Tour from January 22 to February 18, 1988, but did not perform a public concert at the venue.

On August 13, 1990 MC Hammer performed for his Please Hammer Don't Hurt 'Em World Tour. He then returned on September 2, 1992, for his Too Legit to Quit World Tour.

On April 9, 1991, Yes played the first show of their Union tour at The Pensacola Bay Center. This show is notable because it was the first show Yes played with the 8 man line up of Jon Anderson, Chris Squire, Steve Howe, Rick Wakeman, Alan White, Bill Bruford, Trevor Rabin and Tony Kaye, which was inducted into the Rock and Roll Hall of Fame in 2017.

Many other large touring acts, including Gloria Estefan, AC/DC, Page & Plant, David Bowie, Rush & Van Halen have used the arena for pre-tour rehearsals in the past, thanks to the venue's relatively inexpensive rental rates and availability for extended occupation. (Rush opened their Counterparts Tour in Pensacola on January 22, 1994.)

On March 9, 1994, the Pensacola Bay Center hosted the largest Rock for Choice concert in history, which was organized by the band L7 and headlined by Pearl Jam.

On February 26, 1995, Jimmy Page & Robert Plant played a show on their No Quarter Tour in Pensacola. Page & Plant opened their Walking Into Everywhere Tour in Pensacola on May 19, 1998.

On March 11, 1995, Van Halen opened The Balance "Ambulance" Tour in Pensacola.

In March 2000, Britney Spears kicked off her Crazy 2K Tour here.

In February 2012, Jeff Dunham appeared performing for his Uncontrolled Chaos Tour.

Springfest, an annual music event in downtown Pensacola, used the arena in its final years.

Lynyrd Skynyrd has also performed there and the arena also featured moderately in the music video for "What's Your Name" (with Johnny Van Zant and a newly reformed Lynyrd Skynyrd performing a live concert as part of the music video).

Widespread Panic performed on Labor Day weekend, 2019.

== Politics ==
The Pensacola Bay Center has also had various guest speakers, including President George W. Bush in 2004, in the wind-up to the election. During the 2008 presidential race, both Sarah Palin and Michelle Obama used the venue for political rallies as the November election drew close. Republican presidential nominee Mitt Romney visited the venue for a campaign rally on November 3, 2012, as part of his final push in the United States presidential election. Republican candidate Donald Trump visited on January 13, 2016, during the Republican primary. Trump also visited again on September 9, during his presidential campaign against Hillary Clinton.
