= Tamir Linhart =

Israeli and U.S. Continental Indoor Soccer League player

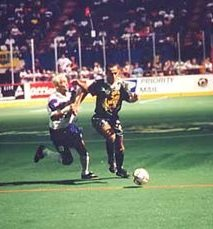
- Linhart playing in 1992

Personal information
- Date of birth: 18 November 1968 (age 57)
- Place of birth: Tel Aviv, Israel
- Height: 1.80 m (5 ft 11 in)
- Position: Attacking midfielder

Youth career
- 1984–1986: Hapoel Tel Aviv
- 1991–1994: George Mason Patriots

Senior career*
Years	Team	Apps	(Gls)
1986–1991	Hapoel Tel Aviv		
1991–1996	Washington Warthogs		
- * Club domestic league appearances and goals

Tamir Linhart (Hebrew: תמיר לינהרט; born 18 November 1968) is an Israeli-born American college soccer player and coach.

== Career ==
Linhart played professionally for 7 years for Hapoel Tel Aviv of the Israeli Premier League and won two times the National Championships. He was a member of the two-time championship team and qualified with Hapoel Tel Aviv for the UEFA Cup. He also played professionally for the Washington Warthogs of the Continental Indoor Soccer League.

From 1991 to 1994, Linhart played for George Mason University and was voted twice All American. Linhart was inducted into the Washington Sports Jewish Hall of Fame in 2002, and into the George Mason Soccer Hall of Fame.

== Coaching career ==
In 1997, Linhart founded the Golden Boot Soccer Academy and works here currently as coach.
