= Scott Cooper (football manager) =

England football manager (born 1970)

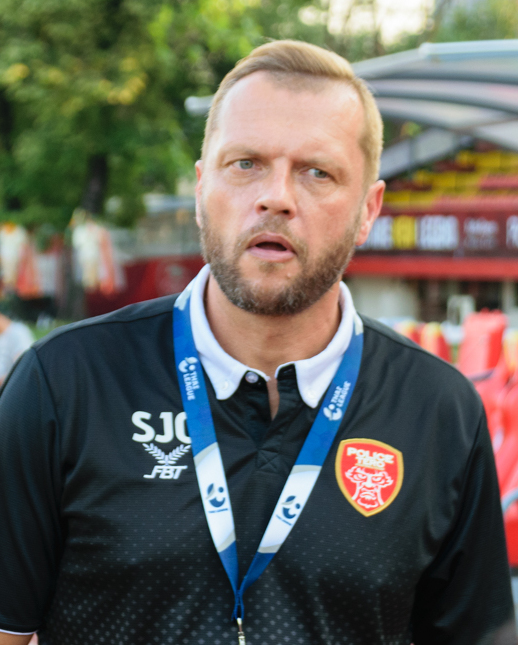
- Cooper with Police Tero in 2018

Personal information
- Full name: Scott Joseph Cooper
- Date of birth: 16 June 1970 (age 56)
- Place of birth: Sheffield, West Riding of Yorkshire, England
- Positions: Right-back; right winger

College career
| Years | Team | Apps | (Gls) |
| 1991-1992 | South Florida Bulls | | |

Managerial career
- 1999: Chester City (assistant)
- 2001: Anguilla
- 2005: Montserrat
- 2009: Anguilla
- 2010: England U-15 (ISFA)
- 2011: Leicester City (youth)
- 2013: Buriram United (youth)
- 2013: Buriram United
- 2014: Muangthong United
- 2014–2015: Mitra Kukar
- 2015–2017: Ubon UMT United
- 2018: Police Tero
- 2018: Philippines (caretaker)
- 2019–2021: Philippines
- 2020: Azkals Development Team
- 2020–2022: Philippines
- 2022: Port
- 2023: Jamshedpur
- 2025: One Taguig
- 2025–2026: Visakha

Scott Joseph Cooper (born 16 June 1970) is an English professional football manager who is the technical director of Cambodian Premier League (CPL) club Visakha FC.

Cooper previously served as the head coach of the Philippines national football team. He has coaching experience with Huntsville Fire, Chester City, the Anguilla national football team, the Montserrat national football team, Leicester City, and the Independent Schools Football Association (ISFA) England under-15 national football team.

== Managerial career ==
=== Early career ===
Cooper has coached the Anguilla and Montserrat national teams.

=== Buriram United ===
Cooper was picked by Buriram United to replace Attaphol Buspakom after the 2013 AFC Champions League against FC Seoul along with his assistant Darren Read.

On his arrival at Buriram United, Cooper found the club in third place of the Thai Premier League, five points adrift of the league leaders. Under Cooper's managerial reign, Buriram were unbeaten in the Thai Premier League, AFC Champions League, Thai FA Cup and Thai League Cup.

Buriram United won 23 out of 29 matches, drawing five and losing only once under Cooper. The club won all their away games at the top four Thai clubs during the season. Named "Manager of the Month" in June 2013, Cooper led Buriram United to the top 10 club rankings in Asia, creating history for the Thai club in the process. Under Cooper's tutelage, Buriram on an average scored 3.1 goals per game whilst conceding 0.75 goals per game.

Cooper also had a major influence on developing Thai players in his squad, as nine Thai players were called up to the national team.

=== Muangthong United ===
On 2 January 2014, Muanthong United officially appointed Cooper as the head coach.

=== Mitra Kukar ===
On 11 December 2014, Mitra Kukar officially appointed Cooper as the head coach.

=== Ubon UMT United ===
In April 2015, Ubon UMT United officially appointed Cooper as the head coach.

=== Philippines ===
In June 2018, Cooper was appointed as senior team adviser of the Philippines (Interim). Cooper was later tasked to oversee the national team's training camp in Bahrain in September 2018 in lieu of the newly appointed head coach Terry Butcher, who resigned from his post in August 2018. Cooper's interim tenure ended in late August 2018 when he was officially named as the regular head coach of the Philippine national team.

On 27 October 2018, Sven-Göran Eriksson took over as manager of the Philippines and Cooper assisted Eriksson in the Philippines' stint at the 2018 AFF Championship and 2019 Asian Cup.

Cooper returned as manager in January 2019 after the conclusion of the Philippines' campaign in the continental tournament and Eriksson's short-term contract. Under Cooper, the Philippines gained its highest ever World Cup point total.

In May 2022, it was announced that Cooper stepped down as head coach of the Philippines men's national team.

=== ADT ===
Cooper coached the Azkals Development Team, a football club meant for national team youth prospects. He mentored the team during the 2020 Philippines Football League season. He was succeeded by Giovanni Villagracia in the following season.

=== Jamshedpur ===
On 14 July 2023, Cooper was appointed as the head coach of Indian Super League club Jamshedpur.

=== One Taguig ===
Cooper was head coach of Philippines Football League club One Taguig from 10 September to 16 November 2025. He recorded six wins and one defeat in seven matches.

=== Visakha ===
On 17 November 2025, Cooper was officially appointed as the head coach of Cambodian Premier League club Visakha FC. In less than 6 months, he led the club into the final of Hun Sen Cup.

Visakha finished as runners-up in the 2025–26 Hun Sen Cup, losing 5–3 on penalties to Svay Rieng following a 4–4 draw after extra time in the final on 24 May 2026. On 30 August 2026, Visakha lost 2–1 to Svay Rieng in the Cambodian Super Cup.

During the 2026–27 season, Cooper resigned as manager to become the club's technical director.

== Managerial statistics ==
As of 19 September 2026

Managerial record by team and tenure
| Team | Nat. | From | To | Record | | | | | Ref. |
| Team | Nat. | From | To | G | W | D | L | Win % | Ref. |
|---|---|---|---|---|---|---|---|---|---|
| Buriram United | (Thailand) | 3 May 2013 | 2 September 2013 | 26 | 18 | 6 | 2 | 69.23 | |
| Muangthong United | (Thailand) | 2 January 2014 | 30 March 2014 | 9 | 5 | 2 | 2 | 55.56 | |
| Mitra Kukar | (Indonesia) | 11 December 2014 | 20 April 2015 | 2 | 0 | 0 | 2 | 0.00 | |
| Ubon UMT United | (Thailand) | 23 April 2015 | 30 November 2017 | 97 | 56 | 21 | 20 | 57.73 | |
| Police Tero | (Thailand) | 1 January 2018 | 24 April 2018 | 7 | 1 | 1 | 5 | 14.29 | |
| Philippines (caretaker) | (Philippines) | 4 August 2018 | 26 October 2018 | 2 | 0 | 2 | 0 | 0.00 | |
| Philippines | (Philippines) | 25 January 2019 | 22 May 2021 | 4 | 1 | 1 | 2 | 25.00 | |
| ADT | (Philippines) | 1 January 2020 | 11 March 2022 | 5 | 3 | 0 | 2 | 60.00 | |
| Philippines U23 | (Philippines) | 22 September 2022 | 22 May 2022 | 3 | 0 | 0 | 3 | 0.00 | |
| Port | (Thailand) | 28 June 2022 | 14 November 2022 | 14 | 6 | 7 | 1 | 42.86 | |
| Jamshedpur | (India) | 15 July 2023 | 29 December 2023 | 12 | 2 | 3 | 7 | 16.67 | |
| One Taguig | (Philippines) | 10 September 2025 | 16 November 2025 | 7 | 6 | 0 | 1 | 85.71 | |
| Visakha | (Cambodia) | 17 November 2025 | Present | 29 | 21 | 5 | 3 | 72.41 | |
| Career Total | | | | 217 | 119 | 48 | 50 | 54.84 | |

The Visakha record includes Cambodian Premier League, Hun Sen Cup and Cambodian Super Cup matches.

^{1} A win or loss by the penalty shoot-out is regarded as the draw in time.

== Honours ==
=== Manager ===
Ubon United

- Regional League Division 2: 2015
