= Oakland Mills High School =

Public high school in Columbia, Maryland, U.S.

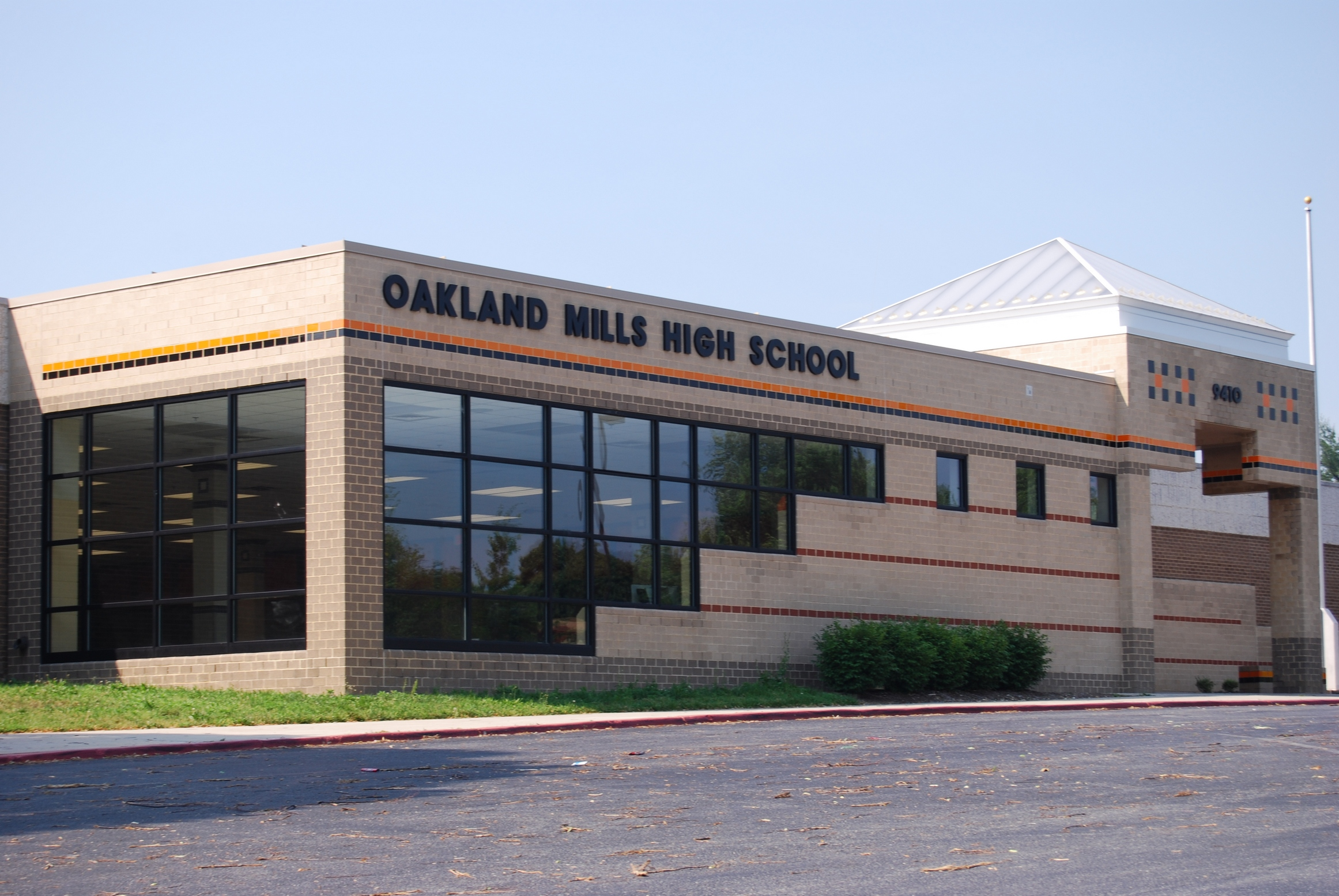

Location
- 9410 Kilimanjaro Road; Columbia, Maryland 21045; United States; 39°12′31″N 76°50′21″W

Information
- Type: Public high school
- Opened: 1973
- School board: Howard County Public Schools Board of Education
- School district: Howard County Public Schools
- School code: 201411
- Principal: Dwayne Williams
- Grades: 9-12
- Age range: 13-21
- Enrollment: 1,161
- Average class size: 30
- Hours in school day: 7
- Campus: Suburban
- Colors: Orange; Black; White
- Mascot: Super Scorp
- Team name: Scorpions
- Rivals: Wilde Lake, River Hill
- Newspaper: The Scroll (omscroll.com)
- Website: omhs.hcpss.org

Oakland Mills High School was established in 1973 as one of the first public high schools to serve the planned community of Columbia, Maryland, established by James Rouse and his company, The Rouse Company in 1967 in Howard County, midway between Baltimore and Washington, D.C. It is part of the Howard County Public School System (HCPSS).

The building had its first renovation in 1991, and another in 1998. A new addition was put onto OMHS in 2004, the "new wing," raising its total capacity to 1,400 students.

Recently, both Oakland Mills High School and Oakland Mills Middle School were affected by a mold issue which required renovations to both schools. The mold issue still has not been solved and mold was discovered in the media center in September 2023.

== Demographics ==
Oakland Mills is one of the largest minority-majority schools in the Howard County Public School System. Of the student body, 43.9% are African American, 20.2% are White, 21.6% are Hispanic, 6.6% are Asian, 0% are Native American, and 7.2% are two or more races.

For students receiving special services in the 2016-2017 year, as many as 6.1% were with limited English proficiency, 44.9% received free/reduced lunches, and 10.1% were enrolled in special education. The graduation rate was 90.4%.

== Academics ==
Since 2009, at least one member of its graduating class has been accepted into an Ivy League school, while graduates of each class have matriculated to prestigious schools such as Oberlin College, Carnegie Mellon University, Georgetown University, the Juilliard School, the Massachusetts Institute of Technology (MIT), and Stanford University.

In the 2009–2010 school year about 30% of students were enrolled in GT classes and about 20% in AP classes, according to the High School Needs/Data Assessment. The enrollment of students in OMHS's 18 AP courses has increased by 4% since 2008; this includes a 3% increase of African American students and a 2% increase of Hispanic students.

Students have been successful in higher-level classes. 89% of OMHS students who took the English Language and Composition AP/GT exam received a passing score of 3 or higher, and 86% of students who took the World History AP/GT exam received a 3 or higher. Both of these numbers impressively exceed the national average pass rate of 53%.

From the 2009–2010 school year to the 2010–2011 school year, there has been a 12.5% increase in the size of the OMHS National Honor Society. Currently, 38% of the students in NHS are minorities and 14% are African American.

Since 2009, there have been 67 Maryland Distinguished Scholars: six semifinalists, and nine finalists. There were 19 National Merit Scholars and five finalists. In the class of 2011, OMHS had six National Achievement Scholars, a program for African American students. Of those six, two were finalists.

== Activities ==
The school also has an accomplished music and drama program. The choir, band, and orchestra are consistently given high ratings at various adjudications and festivals, including the annual WBAL Kids Campaign concert held at the school. Singers from the choir program have performed live on radio for the WBAL Kids Campaign. The Oakland Mills High School Chamber Singers are an active ensemble in their community. The select ensemble has been invited twice to the University of Maryland College Park high school invitational. Multiple members have been a part of nearby select ensembles such as the Maryland All State choirs and Howard County GT/Honor Choir. Oakland Mills has participated twice in the Baltimore area Critics and Awards Program for High School Students (the "Cappies"). The 2005 show, Footloose was nominated for 11 awards, winning two (Ensemble in a Musical and Cameo Actress). The 2006 spring musical, Seussical, was nominated for 13 awards.

The school is also home to over 30 clubs and organizations, including Howard County's only Air Force JROTC program.

The school's boys' cross country team has won a state record 12 cross country state titles, including six in a row in the late eighties and early nineties. The team also had a surge of championships around the start of the 21st century, including some narrow victories over Glenelg High School.

As of the 2026 season, Oakland Mills holds the record for the most state championships won by a boys' soccer team (12).

== Athletics ==
Oakland Mills High School has won many state championships. Here is a list of the titles that the school owns:

- Boys' basketball
  - 1990 - Boys' basketball
  - 2015 - Boys' basketball
- Girls' basketball
  - 1998 - Girls' basketball
- Boy's indoor track
  - 1991 - Boys' 3A indoor track
  - 1993 - Boys' 2A-1A indoor track
  - 1994 - Boys' 2A-1A indoor track
  - 1999 - Boys' 2A-1A indoor track
  - 2000 - Boys' 2A-1A indoor track
  - 2001 - Boys' 2A-1A indoor track
  - 2002 - Boys' 2A-1A indoor track
  - 2004 - Boys' 2A-1A Indoor Track
- Boys' track & field
  - 1981 - Boys' track & field
  - 1989 - Boys' track & field
  - 1991 - Boys' track & field
  - 1993 - Boys' track & field
  - 1994 - Boys' track & field
  - 1995 - Boys' track & field
  - 1996 - Boys' track & field
  - 1998 - Boys' track & field
  - 2000 - Boys' track & field
  - 2001 - Boys' track & field
  - 2002 - Boys' track & field
  - 2004 - Boys' track & field
  - 2010 - Boys' track & field
  - 2021 - Boys' track & field
- Girls' track & field
  - 1978 - Girls' track & field
- Girls' indoor track
  - 1998 - Girls' 2A-1A indoor track
  - 2000 - Girls' 2A-1A indoor track
- Wrestling
  - 1980 - Wrestling
  - 1982 - Wrestling
  - 1986 - Wrestling
  - 2015 - Wrestling
- Boys' cross country
  - 1975 - Boys' cross country
  - 1984 - Boys' cross country
  - 1985 - Boys' cross country
  - 1986 - Boys' cross country
  - 1987 - Boys' cross country
  - 1988 - Boys' cross country
  - 1989 - Boys' cross country
  - 1992 - Boys' cross country
  - 1994 - Boys' cross country
  - 1999 - Boys' cross country
  - 2000 - Boys' cross country
  - 2001 - Boys' cross country
- Boys' soccer
  - 1979 - Boys' soccer
  - 1980 - Boys' soccer
  - 1981 - Boys' soccer
  - 1985 - Boys' soccer
  - 1986 - Boys' soccer
  - 1988 - Boys' soccer
  - 1990 - Boys' soccer
  - 1994 - Boys' soccer
  - 1998 - Boys' soccer
  - 1999 - Boys' soccer
  - 2000 - Boys' soccer
  - 2002 - Boys' soccer
- Girls' soccer
  - 1992 - Girls' soccer
  - 1995 - Girls' soccer
- Football
  - 1998 - Football

== Notable alumni ==
- Darryl Gee — US Olympic soccer player
- Brandon Hardesty - actor, comedian
- David Howard — 7th round pick (241 overall) by the Tennessee Titans in the 2010 NFL draft
- Ameen Khosravian — professional basketball player, Fiba
- Lucy McBath - Congresswoman representing Georgia's 6th District
- Aaron McGruder — creator of comic strip and TV show The Boondocks
- Bree Newsome — activist
- Randy Pausch (class of 1978) — professor at Carnegie Mellon University who gained a level of internet and YouTube fame for recording what is known as his inspirational "Last Lecture" due to a battle with terminal pancreatic cancer
- Clint Peay — fullback, men's national team player, DC United Star, and US Olympic soccer player
- Rob Ryerson — former professional soccer player, soccer coach at Mount St. Mary's University
- Rich Ryerson — former professional soccer player, head coach of the UNLV Rebels men's soccer team
- Dave Sitek — musician in the band TV on the Radio
- Terry W. Virts (class of 1985) — NASA astronaut
- Dante Washington — men's national team player, MLS scorer, and US Olympic soccer player
- Greg Whittington - basketball player
- Jayden DeLeon - American track and field athlete
