= Colette Cunningham =

American soccer player (born 1971)

Personal information
- Full name: Colette Helen Cunningham
- Date of birth: July 1, 1971 (age 55)
- Place of birth: Virginia, United States
- Height: 5 ft 4 in (1.63 m)
- Position: Forward

Youth career
- BRYC Shooting Stars
- –1989: Lake Braddock Bruins

College career
Years	Team	Apps	(Gls)
1989	Marymount Saints	18	(39)
1990–1992	NC State Wolfpack	?	(42)

Senior career*
Years	Team	Apps	(Gls)
1994	Washington Warthogs (indoor)	12	(0)
1994–1995	Lazio		
1995–1998	Sporting Sorrento Crems		
1997–2001	Maryland Pride		
- Soccer Academy United

International career
1992	United States	2	(0)

Managerial career
- 1994: American Eagles (assistant)
- * Club domestic league appearances and goals

Colette Helen Cunningham (formerly Landon; born July 1, 1971) is an American former soccer player who played as a forward, making two appearances for the United States women's national team.

== Career ==
In high school, Cunningham was a four-year varsity player for the Lake Braddock Bruins soccer team, which won the state championship in her senior year. She also played basketball during her high school career. In college, she played for the Marymount Saints in her freshman year of 1989, scoring 39 goals and registering 20 assists in 18 appearances. She holds the NCAA Division III record for most points (goals and assists) in a season (98) and most points per game in a season (5.44). The following year she joined the NC State Wolfpack, where she played until 1992 and was a letter-winner. She scored 42 goals and registed 22 assists during her three seasons with the Wolfpack. She was selected in the ACC All-Tournament team in 1991, as well as the All-ACC First Team in 1991 and 1992.

Cunningham made her international debut for the United States on August 14, 1992 in a friendly match against Norway, which finished as a 1–3 loss. She earned her second and final cap two days later against the same opponent, which finished as a 2–4 loss.

In 1994 Cunningham played for the indoor soccer for the Washington Warthogs of the CISL. She recorded two assists in twelve regular season appearances and one postseason game, becoming the first woman to register a point in U.S. men's professional soccer. She played for the Maryland Pride in the USL W-League from 1997 to 1999, winning the 1996 championship. Following the season, she moved to Italy to play in Rome for Lazio of Serie A. In 1995, she moved to Sporting Sorrento Crems in Sorrento (near Naples), where she played until 1998. She also played for the Maryland Pride in 1997 upon return to the U.S. for the off-season. In 1998, she returned to the United States to care for her ill father and continued playing for the Maryland Pride. She also played for the Soccer Academy United team which won three USASA National Women's Amateur titles.

Cunningham also was an assistant coach for the American Eagles in 1994. She was inducted into the Virginia–D.C. Soccer Hall of Fame in 2019.

== Personal life ==
Cunningham gave birth to her son Kevin in 1996. In 1999, she began a career in law enforcement, and currently works as a patrol lieutenant for the Loudoun County Sheriff's Office in Loudoun County, Virginia. She was born with the surname Cunningham, and later took the married name Landon, which she no longer uses.

== Career statistics ==
=== International ===
United States
Year	Apps	Goals
1992	2	0
Total	2	0
