= Cajundome =

Arena in Louisiana, United States

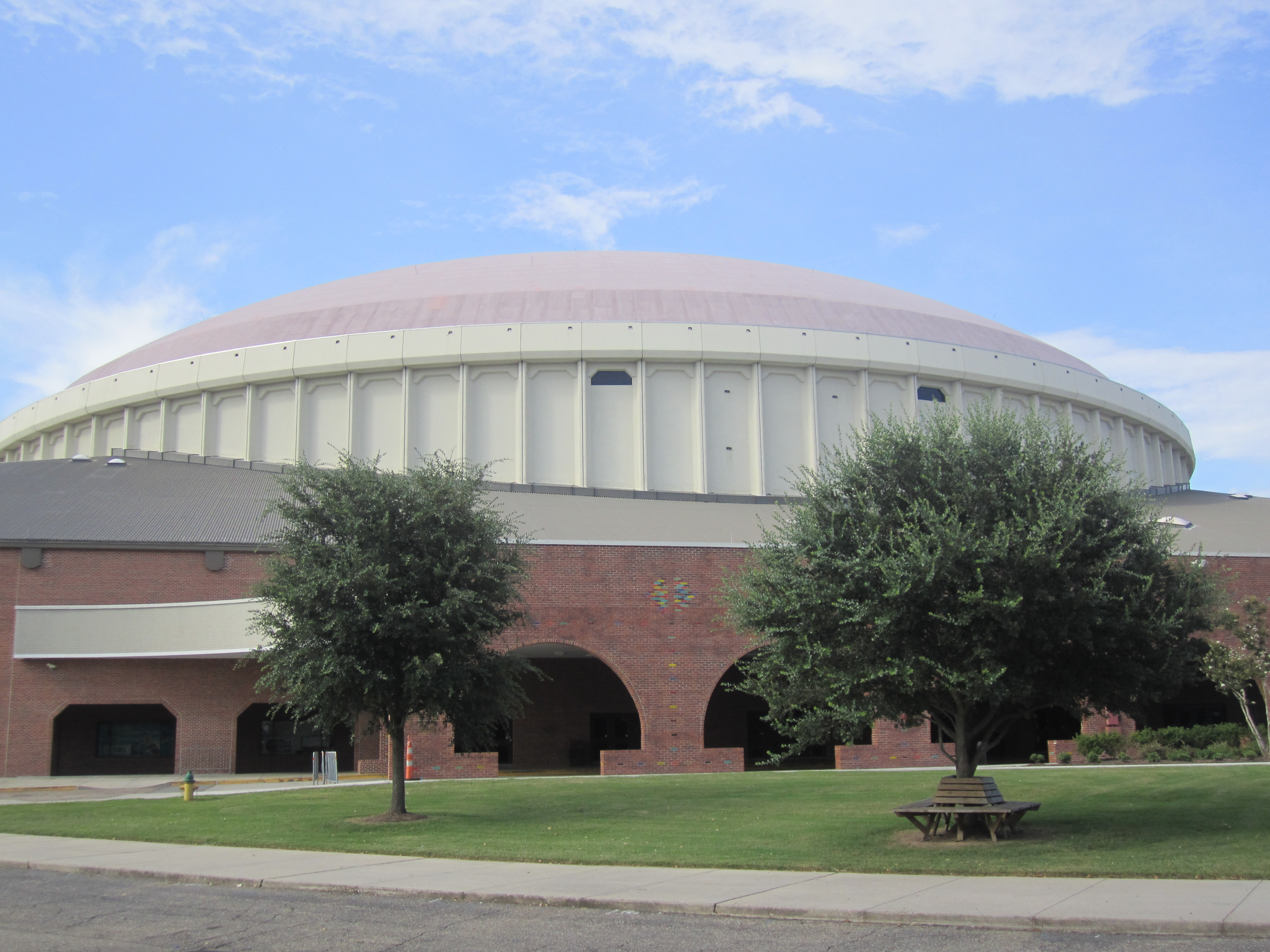
- Interactive map of Cajundome
- Location: 444 Cajundome Boulevard; Lafayette, Louisiana 70506
- Coordinates: 30°13′6.4″N 92°2′20.6″W
- Owner: University of Louisiana at Lafayette
- Operator: Cajundome Commission
- Capacity: Basketball: 11,550; Ice Hockey: 11,433; Concerts: 13,500; Pro Wrestling: 12,121
- Surface: Multi-surface

Construction
- Groundbreaking: January 27, 1982 (44 years ago)
- Opened: November 10, 1985 (40 years ago)
- Cost: $60 million ($180 million in 2025 dollars)
- Architect: Neil Nehrbass
- Structural engineer: William J. Mouton
- General contractor: Blunt Brothers Corp.

Tenants
- Louisiana Ragin' Cajuns (NCAA); Men's basketball (1985–present); Women's basketball (2019–present) (1985–2018; doubleheaders); Louisiana IceGators (ECHL) (1995–2005); Lafayette SwampCats (EISL) (1997–1998); Lafayette Roughnecks (af2) (2001); Louisiana IceGators (SPHL) (2010–2016); Lafayette Wildcatters (SIFL) (2010)

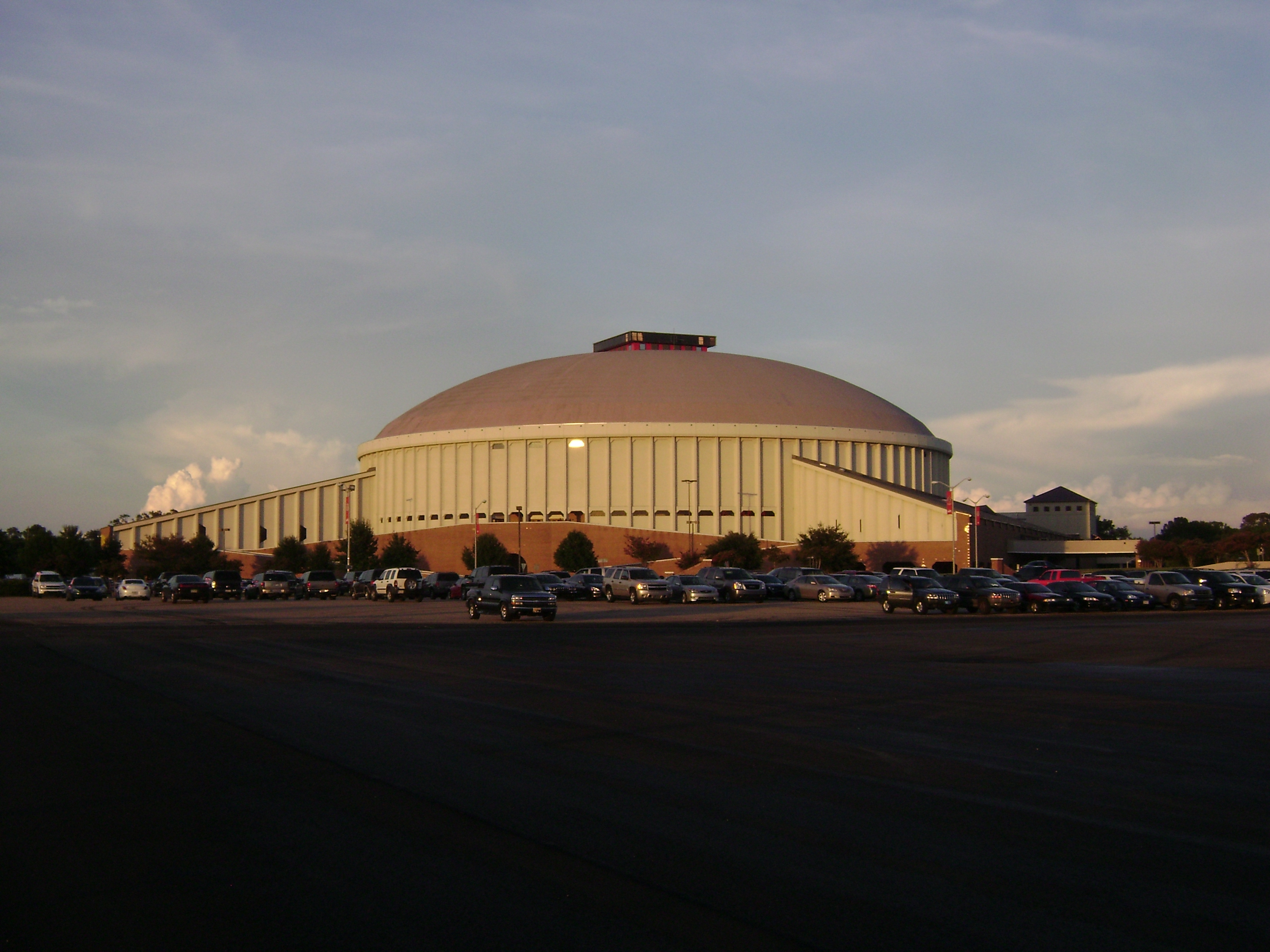
Cajundome

The Cajundome is a 13,500-seat multi-purpose arena located in Lafayette, Louisiana, on the University of Louisiana at Lafayette campus. It is home to the Louisiana Ragin' Cajuns men's and women's basketball programs in addition to hosting various university events and commencement ceremonies including high school graduations.

The arena hosts many regional & national touring concerts (seating for concerts up to 13,500) and special events, such as World Wrestling Entertainment (WWE) events and the annual outdoor Cajun Heartland State Fair, an eleven-day state fair that attracts more than 50,000 guests. The arena also hosts the annual Jr. Beta Club Louisiana state conventions for middle and elementary school students and the Sr. Beta Conventions for high schoolers on occasion. The facility is a recognizable Lafayette landmark that was built by the State of Louisiana, partially funded by the City of Lafayette, and is owned by the University of Louisiana at Lafayette and managed by the CAJUNDOME Commission.

Currently, the CAJUNDOME is the largest basketball arena in the Sun Belt Conference, the largest college basketball arena in Louisiana, the third largest overall indoor arena in Louisiana (behind the Smoothie King Center in New Orleans and the Brookshire Grocery Arena in Bossier City), one of the largest mid-major college basketball arenas, and in the top 10 largest college basketball arenas in the Deep South.

== History ==
=== Renovations ===
The arena underwent a $20 million renovation in 2016, providing seating, concession, and accessibility along with signage & branding updates to the venue.

The CAJUNDOME completed renovations in January 2020 on a former storage space to open The Table Room, an approximate 300 capacity venue available for pre-show early entry events and private event rentals. The all-ages venue consists of table seating, a small performance area and full bar service.

== Sports ==
=== Arena football ===
==== Lafayette Roughnecks ====
The Lafayette Roughnecks of the AF2 played at the CAJUNDOME in 2001.

==== Lafayette Wildcatters ====
The Lafayette Wildcatters of the Southern Indoor Football League played at the CAJUNDOME from 2009 to 2010.

=== Basketball ===
==== Louisiana Ragin' Cajuns Basketball ====
The CAJUNDOME is home to the Louisiana Ragin' Cajuns men's basketball and Louisiana Ragin' Cajuns women's basketball programs.

==== Sun Belt Conference men's basketball tournaments ====
It hosted the 1998, 1999, and 2007 Sun Belt Conference men's basketball tournaments.

=== Boxing ===
On April 27, 2019, Regis Prograis defeated Kiryl Relikh in the sixth round by TKO to win the WBA super-lightweight championship.

=== Ice Hockey ===
==== Louisiana IceGators ====
The Louisiana IceGators of the East Coast Hockey League played host in the CAJUNDOME from 1995 to 2005. During that time, the arena earned the nickname 'The Frozen Swamp'. In 2005, the franchise folded due to financial problems and drops in attendance after the IceGators were in the Top 4 for attendance in the ECHL. In 2009, Danny Smith, a local businessman, decided to bring back the Louisiana IceGators but this time in the Southern Professional Hockey League. A few months after Smith bought it, the franchise was sold to E.C. "Chuck" Anselmo Jr. and E.C. "Chuck" Anselmo, III. In their first season, the IceGators played at Blackham Coliseum. In their second season, the IceGators moved to the CAJUNDOME. In early 2016, the Louisiana IceGators and the SPHL announced that the IceGators would suspend operations for the 2016–17 season citing that the arena renovations would not be completed in time for the season.

=== Soccer ===
==== Lafayette SwampCats ====
The CAJUNDOME was home to the Lafayette SwampCats of the EISL from 1997 to 1998.

=== Top 10 sports crowds at the Cajundome ===
1. 11,479 vs. Loyola Marymount (12/16/92)
2. 11,137 vs. New Orleans (02/01/92)
3. 10,802 vs. New Orleans (01/18/90)
4. 10,651 vs. Massachusetts (10/06/90)
5. 10,487 vs. Georgia (11/22/85)
6. 09,715 vs. Western Kentucky (02/05/94)
7. 09,153 vs. New Orleans (01/05/91)
8. 09,121 vs. South Alabama (03/03/98)
9. 09,121 vs. Western Kentucky (02/26/03)
10. 09,086 vs. Lamar (03/01/86)

=== Professional Wrestling ===
Numerous episodes of WWE television shows have been taped at the arena including WWE Raw, WWE SmackDown, WWE NXT, WWE Heat and WWF Jakked/Metal as well as episodes of WCW television shows WCW Thunder and WCW Worldwide.

- WWF House Show - March 20, 1988.
- WWF House Show - June 16, 1989.
- Superstars of Wrestling - January 26, 1997

Superstars of Wrestling - February 2, 1997

- Superstars of Wrestling - February 9, 1997
- Thunder - June 24, 1999
- Thunder - July 1, 1999
- Thunder - May 17, 2000
- WCW WorldWide - May 27, 2000
- RAW - August 21, 2000
- Jakked - August 26, 2000
- RAW - January 22, 2001
- Jakked - January 27, 2001
- RAW - December 17, 2001
- SmackDown - October 3, 2002
- RAW - September 1, 2003
- Heat - September 7, 2003
- RAW - January 22, 2007
- Heat - January 26, 2007
- RAW - July 9, 2007
- Heat - July 13, 2007
- RAW - March 17, 2008
- Heat - March 23, 2008
- RAW - June 8, 2009
- Superstars - June 11, 2009
- RAW - February 8, 2010
- NXT - December 14, 2010
- Superstars - December 16, 2010
- SmackDown - December 17, 2010
- RAW - October 3, 2011
- RAW - November 26, 2012
- Superstars - November 30, 2012
- RAW - February 18, 2013
- Superstars - February 22, 2013
- Main Event - April 8, 2014
- SmackDown - April 11, 2014
- RAW - September 15, 2014
- Superstars - September 18, 2014
- Main Event - June 9, 2015
- SmackDown - June 11, 2015
- Main Event - January 12, 2016
- SmackDown - January 14, 2016
- RAW - June 12, 2017
- Main Event - June 14, 2017
- SmackDown - September 11, 2018
- 205 Live - September 11, 2018
- RAW - February 18, 2019
- Main Event - February 20, 2019
- SmackDown - June 23, 2023
- SmackDown - October 9, 2026

== Convention Center ==
In 2002, a new convention center addition to the arena was built. The new addition added 37,301 square feet (3,465 m^{2}) of exhibit hall space to the Cajundome's 40,000 square feet (3,716 m^{2}) of arena floor space plus 39,685 square feet (3687 m^{2}) of meeting space including a 15,682 square foot (1457 m^{2}) ballroom, 12,159 square feet (1130 m^{2}) of pre-function space and a 17,590 square foot (1630 m^{2}) outdoor mall holding up to 2,118 for outdoor events.

== Use as a shelter ==
In 2005, following the aftermath of Hurricane Katrina and soon after Hurricane Rita, the Cajundome became one of the Federal Emergency Management Agency's evacuee shelters. Staffed by Red Cross, Salvation Army, Americorp and a host of local charities, the facility became a center of relief for thousands. The recently opened Convention Center addition was also utilized as a distribution logistics point and also housed a Special Needs Clinic. This clinic served those needing additional care not deemed urgent or emergency by local area hospitals.

== See also ==
- List of convention centers in the United States
- List of NCAA Division I basketball arenas
- List of music venues
