= Savannah Civic Center =

Facility in Savannah, Georgia

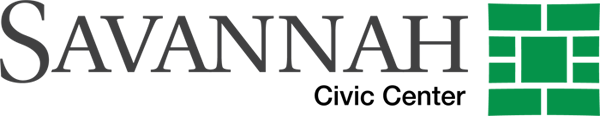
- Address: 301 West Oglethorpe Avenue; Savannah, Georgia, 31401-3643
- Location: Savannah Historic District
- Coordinates: 32°04′36.22″N 81°05′49.25″W
- Owner: City of Savannah
- Operator: OVG Facilities

Construction
- Opened: 1974
- Construction cost: $8 million ($52.2 million in 2025 dollars)

Tenants
- Savannah Spirits (CBA) (1986-88); Savannah Rug Ratz (EISL) (1997-98); Savannah Steam (AIF) (2016); Savannah Coastal Outlaws (APF) (2017)

Website
- Official Website

The Savannah Civic Center is a multi-purpose facility located in Savannah, Georgia, in Savannah Historic District. Built in 1974, the facility consists of an arena, theater, ballroom, and exhibit halls. Throughout the years, the center has hosted various concerts, conventions, exhibits, high school and college graduations, trade shows, theatre, ballet, and comedy shows.

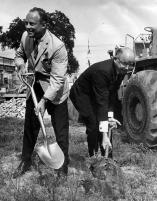
Savannah Mayor Julius Curtis Lewis Jr. (left) and Georgia Governor Lester Maddox at the civic center's groundbreaking in 1970

Each year, the civic center hosts nearly 900 events, including the Savannah Tire Hockey Classic, which awards the "Thrasher Cup" and numerous meetings are held in the building's meeting wings. It was the home to the Savannah Bees basketball team, the Continental Basketball Association's Savannah Spirits basketball team, and the Savannah Rug Ratz soccer team of the EISL. In 1986 and 1987, the arena hosted the Big South Conference's men's basketball tournament.

== New arena ==
In 2017, the city council voted to build a new area, west of downtown. The aging MLK Jr Arena proved to be too small to attract bigger acts and the repairs needed to bring the facility up to code were too costly. Initial plans saw the removal of the arena solely. In June 2019, the council voted to demolish the entire civic center to create more green space in accordance with "The Oglethorpe Plan." Destruction of the center and renovation of the lot will take at least four years, based on the timeline recommended by the Urban Land Atlanta Institute. A campaign to "Save the Mercer" theater inside the Civic Center has been initiated by a longtime Savannah resident, Paul Mazo. Mazo told a local TV station that city officials indicated a preservation campaign will "open the door to some [needed] community discussion."

The new arena, originally known as Savannah Arena and subsequently renamed Enmarket Arena after securing a naming rights agreement in July 2021, opened in the first half of 2022. The estimated cost of the project is $165 million. Perkins + Will have been named the firm in charge of designing the arena, while AECOM Hunt is in charge of construction. City Council has stated there are no plans to demolish the Civic Center until three to five years after the new arena is built.

In June 2024, the Savannah city council voted 7–1 in favor of demolishing the MLK Jr Arena and renovating the Johnny Mercer Theatre, ballroom and community meeting spaces at an estimated net cost of $90 to $120 million.

== Facilities ==
Venues
Martin Luther King Jr. Arena	7,832 (can be expanded up to 9,600 based on configuration)
Johnny Mercer Theatre	2,524
East and West Promenades	400
Civic Center Grand Ballroom	400

== See also ==
- Bulloch–Habersham House, one of the buildings demolished to make way for the original civic center
