= Doug Mello =

American soccer coach

Personal information
- Date of birth: c. 1956 (age 69–70)
- Place of birth: Hartford, Connecticut, United States

Youth career
- Years: Team
- 1974–1977: Aquinas College

Managerial career
- 1978–1982: Aquinas College
- 1983–1988: Siena Heights University
- 1989: University of the Southwest
- 1990–2007: Luther College
- 1995: Des Moines Menace
- 1996: Sioux City Breeze
- 1997–1998: Tallahassee Scorpions
- 2008–2013: Hendrix College
- 2014–2022: Carroll College

Doug Mello is an American soccer coach who holds the record for the most collegiate matches coached (1,191). He is the only university coach to achieve 350 men's wins coupled with 250 women's wins and maintains the unique honor of having been the youngest head coach hired in the history of USA collegiate sports. Mello is a recipient of the NSCAA Letter of Commendation. He holds the NCAA Division III record for most consecutive conference wins (42) with his former squad, Luther College. In his first season as a professional coach in 1995, Mello was awarded Co-Coach Of The Year honors while at the helm of the Des Moines Menace of the USISL Premier League.

Currently, Mello is head coach of the newly formed men's soccer team at Carroll College in Helena, Montana.

== Coaching career ==
In 1978, Mello began his coaching career as the youngest head coach in the history of collegiate sports. At age 20, he was hired by Aquinas College in Grand Rapids, Michigan. At Aquinas, Mello earned All-Conference Honors, and the team became NAIA District 23 champions, allowing them entry to the NAIA regional tournament.

In 1983 and 1985, Mello became coach of the men's and women's soccer programs respectively at Siena Heights University. In their first year, the men's team was regionally ranked. Shortly thereafter, the squad made the national tournament.

Two years after starting the men's team, Mello also started up the women's program at Siena Heights. Again, his team was immediately successful. In their first year, the women's team was ranked in the top 10 nationally for NAIA schools. By the 3rd year, the squad was ranked #1 in the nation throughout a regular season which saw them defeat NCAA Division I foes Michigan State, Michigan, Ohio State, Wright State and Dayton. The team entered the NAIA national tournament with a 23–1 record. Despite playing without five starters who suffered season ending injuries in the lead-up to nationals, the Saints managed to complete the season as the 3rd best NAIA team in the country after defeating Berry College.

While Mello was at Siena Heights, both programs produced numerous All-Americans. For his role, Mello was named District Coach of the Year a combined five times, and Regional Coach of the Year a combined three times. Mello compiled an 81–35–12 record with the men and 53–10–6 with the women.

In 2002, Siena Heights University inducted Mello into its Hall of Fame.

=== University of the Southwest ===
In 1989, Mello spent a single season at University of the Southwest in Hobbs, NM, before moving to Luther College in Decorah, Iowa. His lone season at University of the Southwest was a solid one. He led the men's team to the district finals while also leading the women's team to the district championship trophy.

=== Carroll College ===
Mello resigned from Hendrix College upon being offered the opportunity to be the first coach of the Carroll College Fighting Saints men's soccer team. Already having a cabin in Montana, being an avid fly fisherman and recognizing the special opportunity Carroll College offered him were primary factors in his decision. In his first year at the helm of the Saints, Mello led Carroll to a 6–11–1 record. A year and an additional recruiting class later, the Saints flipped the wins and losses and ended the season at 11–6–2. That win-loss-tie record saw the Saints finish 5th place in the 14 team Cascade Conference and earned them a trip to the newly formed conference's postseason tournament.

=== Professional coaching career ===
In addition to his collegiate duties, Mello also served as head coach of the Des Moines Menace during the 1995 USISL Premier League season. He was co-Coach of the Year with fellow Menace head coach Blair Reid. They took the Menace to the Sizzlin’ Four Tournament where they finished fourth. In 1996, Mello was sole head coach of the Sioux City Breeze. In 1997 and 1998, he moved indoors with the Tallahassee Scorpions of the Eastern Indoor Soccer League.

At present, over 60 of Coach Mello's former players have given back to the game in the form of coaching at the collegiate level. Additionally, many of his former players have served as high school and club coaches. Specially, two of his former players, Miriam Kronienberg Hickey and Michael Kim, have represented their respected countries as national team coaches. Kronienberg Hickey was a women's national team coach for the Netherlands. Kim was a men's national team coach for South Korea.
