= Huntsville Fire =

American professional soccer team

- Huntsville Fire logo
- Full name: Huntsville Fire
- Founded: 1997
- Dissolved: 1998
- Ground: Von Braun Center; Huntsville, Alabama
- Capacity: 6,500
- Owner: Major League Indoor Football, Inc.
- President: Bryan Dresden
- Head Coach: Scott Cooper
- League: Eastern Indoor Soccer League

The Huntsville Fire was an American professional indoor soccer team based in Huntsville, Alabama. The Fire played in the Eastern Indoor Soccer League during both of the league's seasons from 1997 to 1998. They played their home games in the Von Braun Center. The team began the 1997 season as the Florida-based Daytona Beach Speedkings before financial struggles forced a sale early in the season.

During their existence, the Fire/Speedkings played a combined total of 52 games, winning 29, two via shootout, and losing 23, two via shootout. They scored a total of 810 points and allowed a total of 702 points and notched 87 total standings points out of a possible 156 points. The EISL awarded 3 standings points for a win, 2 for a shootout win, 1 for a shootout loss, and 0 for a loss in regulation.

== History ==
=== 1997 season ===
The team, a charter member of the Eastern Indoor Soccer League, was founded as the Daytona Beach Speedkings. They played their home games at the Ocean Center in Daytona Beach, Florida, under the direction of coach Scott Cooper. The team played the first-ever game in EISL history, losing to the Savannah Rug Ratz in front of a "disappointing" crowd of 600 fans. Despite having a winning record (5–3) and the league's top offense, the team failed to draw fans and suffered financially. Before the season, team owner Blake Cullen told the Orlando Sentinel that the team would need to average about 3,000 fans per game to break even. The team's official home attendance average was 609 per game but the bulk of those were complimentary tickets with the SpeedKings selling fewer than 200 tickets per game.

This failure prompted Cullen to sell the team to Major League Indoor Football, Inc., based in Clearwater, Florida, who announced the team would relocate to the Von Braun Center in Huntsville, Alabama. In just three weeks the new management headed by team president Bryan Dresden, moved the team from Daytona Beach opening to an inaugural crowd of over 2500 new fans in Huntsville, Alabama. The renamed Huntsville Fire finished the season with a record of 13 wins and 11 losses, including 1 shootout win. This gave the team a total of 38 points for the 1997 season and 4th place in the seven-team league.

=== 1998 season ===
The Fire returned for the 1998 season. They finished the season with a record of 16 wins and 12 losses (including 1 shootout win and two shootout losses) for 49 points. This placed them 3rd overall in the seven-team league. The Fire made the playoffs, losing to the Mississippi Beach Kings 2 games to 1 in the semi-final round. The Fire averaged 2,535 fans per game, fourth-best in the EISL where the average league game saw 2,733 fans in attendance.

Lee Edgerton was named EISL Most Valuable Player for the 1998 season. Ed Carmean was honored with the EISL's first Sportsmanship Award, presented to the player who "displays gentlemanly play and the ability to treat players, fans and officials with genuine respect and kindness." Huntsville Fire players named to the 1998 EISL All-League Team included midfielder Lee Edgerton and defender Ed Carmean. Players named to the EISL All-League Third Team included defender Carlton Williams. Players receiving All-League Honorable Mentions included defender Abraham Francois and midfielder Jamie Harding.

=== Shutdown ===
After the season, in late September 1998, the team fired its five-person staff, including head coach Scott Cooper and general manager Jim Krause, citing "significant" financial losses. Team president Bryan Dresden said he would not move or fold the team but that additional local investors were required for the team to continue. This became moot when the EISL itself folded in late December 1998.
