= Tallahassee Scorpions =

- Tallahassee Scorpions logo
- Full name: Tallahassee Scorpions
- Founded: 1997
- Dissolved: 1998
- Ground: Tallahassee-Leon County Civic Center; Tallahassee, Florida
- Capacity: 9,596
- Owners: David Elmore; Donna Tuttle
- Head Coach: Doug Mello
- League: Eastern Indoor Soccer League

The Tallahassee Scorpions were an American professional indoor soccer team based in Tallahassee, Florida, that played in the EISL during both of the league's seasons from 1997 to 1998. They played their home games at the Tallahassee-Leon County Civic Center.

During their existence, the Scorpions played a total of 52 regular season games, winning 28 (one via shootout) and losing 25. They scored a total of 705 goals and allowed a total of 577 goals and notched 80 total points in standings out of a possible 156 points. (The EISL awarded 3 points for a win, 2 for a shootout win, 1 for a shootout loss, and 0 for a loss in regulation.)

The team won one division title but failed to advance past that in the first season and had a losing record in its second and final season. The team ceased operations after the league collapsed in late December 1998.

David Elmore, of the Elmore Sports Group, purchased the franchise in 1996 and owned them throughout their existence, along with his wife, Donna Tuttle.

== History ==
=== 1997 season ===
The Scorpions finished third overall in the seven-team league. They finished the season with a record of 15 wins (including 1 shootout win) and 9 losses for a total of 44 standings points.

Scorpions player Billy Reinhardt was named the EISL's Most Valuable Player for 1997.

=== 1998 season ===
The Scorpions finished fifth overall in the seven-team league. They finished the season with a record of 12 wins and 16 losses for a total of 36 standings points. The team did not qualify for the playoffs. The team averaged 2,041 fans per game over their 14 home games in the 1998 regular season, sixth-best in the league.

Tallahassee Scorpions defender Dan Radke was named to the 1998 EISL All-League Team. Players receiving All-League Honorable Mentions included defender Harold Ooft, midfielder Kurt Keefer, and forward Hunter Goff.
