= League of Ireland Premier Division Manager of the Month =

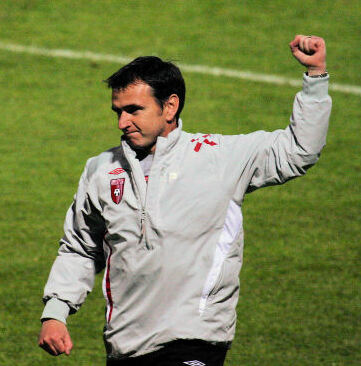
Pat Fenlon won the award in June 2009.

The League of Ireland Premier Division Manager of the Month award is a monthly award given to the best manager in the top flight of Irish football.

== Selection panel ==
The selection is made by the Soccer Writers' Association of Ireland, commonly known as the SWAI.

== Past winners ==
=== 2009 ===
Month	Player	Club
March	(England) Ian Foster	Galway United
April	(Republic of Ireland) Paul Doolin	Cork City
May	(Northern Ireland) Michael O'Neill	Shamrock Rovers
June	(Republic of Ireland) Pat Fenlon	Bohemians
July	(Northern Ireland) Sean Connor	Dundalk
August	(Northern Ireland) Michael O'Neill	Shamrock Rovers
September	(England) Paul Cook	Sligo Rovers
