= Irad, Kentucky =

Unincorporated community in Kentucky, United States

- Unincorporated community
- Location in Kentucky Location in the United States
- Coordinates: 38°5′31″N 82°44′19″W
- Country: United States
- State: Kentucky
- County: Lawrence
- Elevation: 623 ft (190 m)
- Time zone: UTC-5 (Eastern (EST))
  - Summer (DST): UTC-4 (EDT)
- GNIS feature ID: 508316

Irad is an unincorporated community located in Lawrence County, Kentucky, United States. Its post office is closed.
