= Indiana Twisters =

Defunct professional indoor soccer team

Indiana Twisters
| Founded-Operated | 1996 (Founded) 1996 – 1997 |
| Arena | Market Square Arena |
| Based in | Indianapolis, Indiana |
| Colors | red, black, silver (1996)/purple, green, white (1997) |
| League | CISL |

The Indiana (née Indianapolis) Twisters were a professional indoor soccer team that played in the Continental Indoor Soccer League in 1996 and 1997.

== History ==
The team was founded by two brothers, Rodney and David Goins. They announced the CISL expansion team on February 22, 1996. The team received its nickname after a "Name the Team" contest that drew more than 250 entries. The name "Tornados" was the winning entry, but team owners Executive Sports Management, Inc. (ESM, Inc. Owner David Goins, CEO Creighton LaRue and COO Elizabeth Pribyl), altered that a bit to capitalize on the release that summer of the motion picture Twister. The Indianapolis Twisters made their debut in an 8–2 loss to the Detroit Neon in Auburn Hills, Michigan on June 14, 1996.

While the Twisters suffered several hard-luck losses through their first half of their inaugural season, things were really tumultuous behind the scenes. After drawing a home-opener crowd of 5,109 on June 21 against the Washington Warthogs (a 7–6 overtime loss), the crowds at Market Square Arena dwindled to 2,563 by a July 27 game against the Portland Pride and 2,125 who witnessed a 12–10 loss to the Anaheim Splash on August 14.

By that point, the league had already made efforts to intercede and take over the franchise. On August 7, 1996, league commissioner Ron Weinstein and Roy Turner, a former indoor soccer general manager working with the league, met with Twisters' ownership to outline what the Indianapolis Star described as "the league's intent to control the franchise until new ownership is found."

The league wound up operating the team for its final six games as David and Rodney Goins, brothers who had headed up the ownership group, suspended operations on September 1, 1996, following an 8–5 win over the Houston Hotshots attended by an announced 2,856 fans. The team went 2–4 as "wards of the league", and was not eliminated from the playoff hunt until a 7–4 loss to Monterrey La Raza on September 20, 1996, in front of a club-record crowd of 9,315 (many enticed by $5 general-admission tickets).

On September 27, 1996, Indianapolis trucking company owners Dan and Carl Cook became the team's new owners and announced plans to change its name to the Indiana Twisters for its second season in the league. Two days later, the Twisters finished their first season with an 8–7 win in Monterrey to finish with a 10–18 record.

Besides the new name, the team acquired new colors (green and purple to replace black, red and silver) for its 1997 season and showed what a difference a year could make by winning its season opener 9–2 at Detroit, 364 days after its inaugural game.

While the team struggled out of the starting blocks in 1997 (winning just two of its first seven games), it caught fire in mid-July, winning 13 of its next 16 outings. The Twisters officially clinched a playoff spot with a 15–7 win at home to the Sacramento Knights on September 7, 1997.

Finishing 17–11, the Twisters finished second by virtue of a tiebreaker with the Houston Hotshots, but were forced to give up home field advantage in the first round of the playoffs with Houston because Market Square Arena was booked for an International Hockey League game on Saturday, October 4, 1997. Indiana hosted Game One of the best-of-two-with-minigame series on Friday, October 3 and, surprisingly (as they had won 10 of their last 11 at home and gone 11–3 at MSA during the regular season) lost 6–4 in a game nationally televised on Prime Network.

Forced to win twice in a place they'd never won before, the Twisters managed to force a third and decisive "minigame" by scoring four fourth-quarter goals and taking Game Two, 7–4, on Sunday evening, October 5, 1997. Having spent most of their energy and having lost team captain and leading scorer Mariano Bollella to a knee injury late in the second game spelled doom for the Twisters in the fifteen-minute tiebreaker as they fell 4–1. Matt Blackbourne scored the final goal in team history.

When the league collapsed at Christmas 1997, the Twisters were left in limbo. What was left of its assets were purchased in the winter of 1998 by MorSports, Inc., owners of the city's A-League outdoor soccer franchise, the Indiana Blast. MorSports intended to enter the club in the National Professional Soccer League, and, in fact, held a press conference announcing those intentions on February 18, 1998. The plans never came to fruition, however, and the Twisters never played again.

== Head coaches ==
Jorge Espinoza, 1996–1997

== Year-by-year ==
| Year | League | Reg. season | GF | GA | Pct | Finish | Playoffs | Owner(s) | Avg. attendance |
|---|---|---|---|---|---|---|---|---|---|
| 1996 | CISL | 10–18 | 160 | 188 | .357 | 6th East | Out of playoffs | David Goins, Rodney Goins | 3,311 |
| 1997 | CISL | 17–11 | 194 | 177 | .607 | 2nd East | Lost quarterfinal | Dan Cook, Kim Cook, Carl Cook | 3,212 |
