= Savannah Rug Ratz =

- Savannah Rug Ratz 1998 logo
- Full name: Savannah Rug Ratz
- Founded: 1997; 28 years ago
- Dissolved: 1998; 27 years ago
- Ground: Savannah Civic Center; Savannah, Georgia
- Capacity: 9,600
- Owner: Low Country Pro Indoor Soccer Club Inc.
- President: Ken Silver
- Head Coach: Ian MacDonald
- League: Eastern Indoor Soccer League

The Savannah Rug Ratz were an indoor soccer team based in Savannah, Georgia that played in the EISL during both of the leagues seasons from 1997–1998. They played their home games in the Savannah Civic Center.

During their existence, the Rug Ratz played a total of 52 games under head coach Ian MacDonald, winning 13, one via shootout, and losing 39, two via shootout. They scored a total of 564 goals and allowed a total of 832 goals and notched 40 total points in standings out of a possible 156 points. (The EISL awarded 3 points for a win, 2 for a shootout win, 1 for a shootout loss, and 0 for a loss in regulation.)

The team had planned to return for 1999 before the league folded in December 1998.

== History ==
=== 1997 season ===
The Greater Savannah Sports Council worked with the Alaska-based ownership group to bring the Rug Ratz to Savannah. The Rug Ratz finished 6th overall in the seven-team league. They finished the season with a record of 7 wins and 17 losses, including 1 shootout win and 2 shootout losses, for a total of 22 points. The team's average attendance ranked sixth in the seven-team league.

=== 1998 season ===
The Rug Ratz began the 1998 season with new owners and a new logo. Savannah Sand Gnats principal owner Ken Silver and local investors (as "Low Country Pro Indoor Soccer Club Inc.") purchased the team in February 1998, pledging higher budgets and better community outreach. The team's first home game was postponed after a late cleaning of the turf left it too wet for safe play at game time.

The Rug Ratz finished 7th overall in the seven-team league. They finished the season with a record of 6 wins and 22 losses for a total of 18 points. The Rug Ratz averaged 1,747 fans per game, worst in the EISL where the average league game saw 2,733 fans in attendance. Head coach Ian MacDonald left the team after the season.

Savannah Rug Ratz forward Shawn Beyer was named to the 1998 EISL All-League Second Team. Players receiving All-League Honorable Mentions included defenders Dan McManemy and Sean Scott plus midfielder Colin Buck.
