= Mississippi Beach Kings =

- Mississippi Beach Kings logo
- Full name: Mississippi Beach Kings
- Founded: 1997 (as Columbus Comets)
- Dissolved: 1998
- Ground: Mississippi Coast Coliseum; Biloxi, Mississippi
- Capacity: 9,150
- General Manager: Roy Turner
- Head Coach: Gary Hindley
- League: Eastern Indoor Soccer League

The Mississippi Beach Kings were an indoor soccer team based in Biloxi, Mississippi, United States. They played their games in the Mississippi Coast Coliseum. They were members of the Eastern Indoor Soccer League and played only during the 1998 season. During the 1997 season, the team played in Columbus, Georgia as the Columbus Comets.

During their existence, the Beach Kings/Comets played a total of 52 games, winning 21 (including two via shootout) and losing 31 (including four via shootout). They scored a total of 595 goals and allowed a total of 719 goals and notched 65 total points in standings out of a possible 156 points. (The EISL awarded 3 points for a win, 2 for a shootout win, 1 for a shootout loss, and 0 for a loss in regulation.)

The team was successful in Biloxi, earning with the league's second-best average attendance in the 1998 regular season with 3,187 fans per game, and nearly 4,000 per game in the playoffs. The Beach Kings planned to return for the 1999 season but the league shutdown after two other teams withdrew.

== Year-by-year ==
Year	League	Reg. season	Playoffs	Attendance average
1997	EISL	7th EISL, 3–21	Did not qualify	N/A
1998	EISL	2nd EISL, 18–10	Won Semi-Finals vs. Huntsville Fire (2–1); Lost Final vs. Lafayette SwampCats (10–9)	3,187

== Awards and honors ==
Head coach Gary Hindley was named EISL Coach of the Year for the 1998 season. General manager Roy Turner was named EISL Executive of the Year for the 1998 season.

Mississippi Beach Kings players named to the 1998 EISL All-League Team included goalkeeper Stuart Dobson and midfielder Novi Marojevic. Players named to the EISL All-League Second Team included midfielder Darren Snyder. Players named to the EISL All-League Third Team included midfielder Curtis Stelzer. Players receiving All-League Honorable Mentions included defender Damian Harley and midfielder Antonio Sutton.

== Revival plans ==
In January 2015, a group of Atlanta-based investors announced plans to potentially revive the Beach Kings as members of the Major Arena Soccer League. A local partner was added in February 2015 as negotiations with the league and the arena continued.
