= Lafayette SwampCats =

- Lafayette SwampCats logo
- Full name: Lafayette SwampCats
- Founded: 1997
- Dissolved: 1999
- Ground: Cajundome; Lafayette, Louisiana
- Capacity: 12,068
- Owner: Tom Galloway, Wayne Elsmore
- Manager: Jack Castle
- Coach: David Poggi
- League: Eastern Indoor Soccer League

The Lafayette SwampCats were a professional indoor soccer team based in Lafayette, Louisiana that played in the EISL during both of the leagues seasons from 1997 to 1998. They played their home games in the Cajundome. The SwampCats were champions of the EISL in both 1997 and 1998.

During their existence, the SwampCats played a total of 52 regular season games, winning 40, two via shootout, and losing 15, one via shootout. They scored a total of 643 goals and allowed a total of 471 goals and notched 113 total points in standings out of a possible 156 points. (The EISL awarded 3 points for a win, 2 for a shootout win, 1 for a shootout loss, and 0 for a loss in regulation.)

== History ==
=== 1997 season ===
The SwampCats finished first overall in the seven-team league. They finished the season with a record of 18 wins, 6 losses and 2 shootout wins for 52 points. The SwampCats won the EISL championship, defeating the Baton Rouge Bombers 12–9 in the championship game.

=== 1998 season ===
The SwampCats finished first overall in the seven-team league. They finished the season with a record of 20 wins, 8 losses and 1 shootout loss for 61 standings points. The team averaged 4,472 fans per game over their 14 home games in the 1998 regular season.

The SwampCats made the playoffs, defeating the Baton Rouge Bombers 2 games to 0 in the semi-final round. In the championship game, with 4,561 fans in attendance, the SwampCats defeated the Mississippi Beach Kings 10–9 to win the EISL championship.

Lafayette SwampCats forward Todd Dusosky, with the team on loan from the Milwaukee Wave of the NPSL, was named to the 1998 EISL All-League Team. Players named to the EISL All-League Second Team included goalkeeper Chuck Granade and defender Wes Sechrist. Players named to the EISL All-League Third Team included defender Troy Dusosky and midfielder Doug Tegge. Players receiving All-League Honorable Mentions included defender Craig Rhodis.
