= Washington Warthogs =

Defunct professional indoor soccer team

- Short name: Warthogs
- Founded: 1994
- Dissolved: 1997
- Stadium: USAir Arena; Landover, Maryland
- Owner: Abe Pollin
- League: Continental Indoor Soccer League
- 1997: Eastern Division: 5th

The Washington Warthogs were a professional indoor soccer team in the Continental Indoor Soccer League (CISL) from 1994 to 1997. They played their home games in the USAir Arena in Landover, Maryland, an arena they shared with the Washington Bullets, Washington Capitals, and the Georgetown Hoyas. Team owner Abe Pollin also operated the Bullets and Capitals.

The Warthogs featured the league's only female player, first with Colette Cunningham and then Kristine Lilly replaced her the next year. Jim Gabarra was the team's coach from 1994 to 1997 and also played as a player–coach for his first three seasons. The four seasons that the Warthogs played in Washington they average attendance was 6,489 per game. Some games were televised on HTS.

The two top players of the team over its history were Denison Cabral and Dante Washington. Both went on to strong outdoor careers with Washington playing in MLS, and both later played for the Baltimore Blast of the MISL. Kyle Glasgow was the only fan elected to the Warthog hall of fame. The team employed teenage cheerleaders, named the "Warthog Girls", crowd entertainers, and a soccer clinic to draw families and younger fans to attend games.

== Notable players ==
- (United States) Colette Cunningham
- (Bulgaria) Bozhidar Iskrenov
- (United States) Kristine Lilly
- (Israel) (United States) Irad Young
- (United States) Matt Weber
