= Eastern Indoor Soccer League =

American professional regional indoor soccer league

- Sport: Indoor soccer
- Founded: 1997
- Ceased: 1998
- No. of teams: 7
- Country: United States
- Last champion(s): (2) Lafayette SwampCats

The Eastern Indoor Soccer League (EISL) was an American professional regional indoor soccer league. The league featured teams from the Southeastern United States. The regular seasons were played from May to August with post-season play in September. The EISL lasted two seasons before folding.

== 1997 season ==
Team	GP	W	L	SOW	SOL	PF	PA	Pts
Lafayette SwampCats	24	18	6	2	0	324	251	52
Baton Rouge Bombers	24	16	8	0	1	354	305	49
Tallahassee Scorpions	24	15	9	1	0	370	316	44
Huntsville Fire^{1}	24	13	11	1	0	467	355	38
Tupelo Hound Dogs	24	12	12	1	0	354	380	35
Savannah Rug Ratz	24	7	17	1	2	292	386	22
Columbus Comets	24	3	21	0	3	250	414	12

^{1} Huntsville began the season as the Daytona Beach Speed Kings.

CHAMPIONSHIP GAME: Lafayette 12, Baton Rouge 9

== 1998 season ==
Team	GP	W	L	SOW	SOL	PF	PA	Pts
Lafayette SwampCats	28	20	8	0	1	319	220	61
Mississippi Beach Kings^{2}	28	18	10	2	1	345	305	53
Huntsville Fire	28	16	12	1	2	343	347	49
Baton Rouge Bombers	28	16	12	1	0	335	261	47
Tallahassee Scorpions	28	12	16	0	0	335	261	36
Pensacola Flyers^{2}	28	10	18	0	1	321	352	31
Savannah Rug Ratz	28	6	22	0	0	272	446	18

^{2} Before the season, the Tupelo team moved to Pensacola, Florida, and Columbus moved to Biloxi, Mississippi.

SEMI-FINALS: Lafayette over Baton Rouge 2 games to 0; Mississippi over Huntsville 2 games to 1.
CHAMPIONSHIP GAME: Lafayette 10, Mississippi 9

== Teams ==
=== Baton Rouge Bombers ===
The Baton Rouge Bombers were based in the city of Baton Rouge, Louisiana and played their home games in the Baton Rouge River Center Arena. The Bombers played a total of 52 games winning 32, one via shootout, and losing 20, one via shootout. They scored a total of 689 points and allowed a total of 566 points and notched 96 total points in standings out of a possible 156 points.

=== Columbus Comets ===
The Columbus Comets were based in the city of Columbus, Georgia. They only played during the 1997 season before moving to Biloxi, Mississippi, for the 1998 season as the Mississippi Beach Kings. The team played 24 games and finished the season with a record of 3 wins, 21 losses, and 3 shootout losses for 12 points.

=== Huntsville Fire ===
Founded as the Florida-based Daytona Beach SpeedKings in 1997, after 8 games the team was sold, relocated, and renamed. The Huntsville Fire were based in the city of Huntsville, Alabama, and played their home games in the Von Braun Center. The Fire played a total of 52 games, winning 29, two via shootout, and losing 23, two via shootout. They scored a total of 810 points and allowed a total of 702 points and notched 87 total points in standings out of a possible 156 points.

=== Lafayette SwampCats ===
The Lafayette SwampCats were based in the city of Lafayette, Louisiana and played their home games in the Cajundome. The SwampCats played a total of 52 games winning 40, two via shootout, and losing 15, one via shootout. They scored a total of 643 points and allowed a total of 471 points and notched 113 total points in standings out of a possible 156 points. The SwampCats were champions of the EISL in 1997 and 1998.

=== Mississippi Beach Kings ===
The Mississippi Beach Kings were based in the city of Biloxi, Mississippi, and played their games in the Mississippi Coast Coliseum. The Beach Kings played only during the 1998 season. During the 1997 season, the team played in Columbus, Georgia, as the Columbus Comets. The team played 28 games and finished the season with a record of 18 wins, 10 losses, 2 shootout wins and 1 shootout loss for 53 points.

=== Pensacola Flyers ===
The Pensacola Flyers were based in the city of Pensacola, Florida, and played their games in the Pensacola Civic Center. The Flyers played only during the 1998 season. During the 1997 season, the team played in Tupelo, Mississippi, as the Tupelo Hound Dogs. The team played 28 games and finished the season with a record of 10 wins, 18 losses and 1 shootout loss for 30 points.

=== Savannah Rug Ratz ===
The Savannah Rug Ratz were based in the city of Savannah, Georgia, and played their home games in the Savannah Civic Center. The Rug Ratz played a total of 52 games winning 14 of them, one via shootout, and losing 39, two via shootout. They scored a total of 564 points and allowed a total of 832 points and notched 40 total points in standings out of a possible 156 points.

=== Tallahassee Scorpions ===
The Tallahassee Scorpions were based in the city of Tallahassee, Florida, and played their home games in the Donald L. Tucker Center. The Scorpions played a total of 52 games winning 28 of them, one via shootout, and losing 25. They scored a total of 705 points and allowed a total of 577 points and notched 80 total points in standings out of a possible 156 points.

=== Tupelo Hound Dogs ===
The Tupelo Hound Dogs were based in the city of Tupelo, Mississippi. They only played during the 1997 season before moving to Pensacola, Florida, for the 1998 season as the Pensacola Flyers. The team played 24 games and finished the season with a record of 12 wins, 12 losses, and 1 shootout win for 35 points.
