= 2017–18 Major Arena Soccer League season =

Major Arena Soccer League
- Season: 2017–18
- Champions: Baltimore Blast
- Matches: 176
- Goals: 2,402 (13.65 per match)
- Top goalscorer: Franck Tayou (71)
- Longest winning run: 17 Games: Monterrey Flash (11/5/17–2/11/18)
- Longest losing run: 13 Games: Turlock Express (12/15/17–2/16/18)

The 2017–18 Major Arena Soccer League season is the tenth season for the league. The regular season started on October 28, 2017, and ended on March 4, 2018. Each team played a 22-game schedule. The Baltimore Blast won their third straight Ron Newman Cup Championship by defeating the Monterrey Flash 4–3 on March 25. 40 anniversary of professional indoor soccer in North America.

== Standings ==
Final as of March 4, 2018
2017-18 League Championship
2017-18 Playoff Team
(Bold) Division Winner

=== Eastern Conference ===
Place	Team	GP	W	L	Pct	GF	GA	GB	Home	Road
Eastern Division
1	Baltimore Blast	22	17	5	.773	143	109	—	11-0	6-5
2	Syracuse Silver Knights	22	13	9	.591	140	130	4	7-4	6-5
3	Florida Tropics SC	22	10	12	.455	131	141	7	5-6	5-6
4	Harrisburg Heat	22	6	16	.273	114	148	11	4-7	2-9
Central Division
1	Milwaukee Wave	22	17	5	.773	172	124	—	10-1	7-4
2	Cedar Rapids Rampage	22	11	11	.500	146	144	6	7-4	4-7
3	Kansas City Comets	22	7	15	.318	165	190	10	5-6	2-9
4	St. Louis Ambush	22	3	19	.136	110	154	14	1-10	2-9

=== Western Conference ===
Place	Team	GP	W	L	Pct	GF	GA	GB	Home	Road
Southwest Division
1	Monterrey Flash	22	20	2	.909	179	110	—	10-1	10-1
2	Sonora Soles	22	15	7	.682	228	182	5	10-1	5-6
3	El Paso Coyotes	22	11	11	.500	179	200	9	7-4	4-7
4	RGV Barracudas FC	22	3	19	.136	129	222	17	2-9	1-10
Pacific Division
1	San Diego Sockers	22	19	3	.864	166	84	—	11-0	8-3
2	Tacoma Stars	22	11	11	.500	134	134	8	7-4	4-7
3	Ontario Fury	22	10	12	.455	155	142	9	6-5	4-7
4	Turlock Express	22	3	19	.136	111	188	16	2-9	1-10

== 2018 Ron Newman Cup ==
=== Format ===
The top two teams from each division qualified for the post-season. The Division Finals are a 2-game home and home series, with a 15-minute mini-game played immediately after Game 2 if the series is tied. The Conference Finals and Championship are single elimination.

=== Eastern Conference Playoffs ===
==== Eastern Division Final ====
March 8, 2018
7:05 PM EDT
Game 1

Syracuse Silver Knights	6–7	Baltimore Blast
	Report

Oncenter War Memorial Arena
Attendance: 1,653
Referee: Kyle Trimble
March 11, 2018
5:05 PM EST
Game 2

Baltimore Blast	5–4	Syracuse Silver Knights
	Report

SECU Arena
Attendance: 3,611
Referee: Rich Grady

Baltimore wins series 2–0

==== Central Division Final ====
March 10, 2018
12:05 PM CST
Game 1

Cedar Rapids Rampage	8–9 (OT)	Milwaukee Wave
	Report

Odeum Expo Center
Attendance: 1,211
Referee: Rich Grady
March 11, 2018
1:05 PM CST
Game 2

Milwaukee Wave	8–7	Cedar Rapids Rampage
	Report

UW-Milwaukee Panther Arena
Attendance: 4,891
Referee: Ryan Cigich

Milwaukee wins series 2–0

==== Eastern Conference Final ====
March 16, 2018
7:35 PM EDT

Baltimore Blast	10–6	Milwaukee Wave
	Report

SECU Arena
Attendance: 3,173
Referee: Kia Dehpanah

=== Western Conference Playoffs ===
==== Southwest Division Final ====
March 8, 2018
8:15 PM MST
Game 1

Sonora Soles	7–8	Monterrey Flash
	Report

Centro de Usos Multiples
Attendance: 7,000
Referee: Jorge Zuany
March 11, 2018
5:05 PM CST
Game 2

Monterrey Flash	9–5	Sonora Soles
	Report

Arena Monterrey
Attendance: 4,125
Referee: Manuel Ortiz Jr

Monterrey wins series 2–0

==== Pacific Division Final ====
March 8, 2018
7:35 PM PST
Game 1

Tacoma Stars	5–2	San Diego Sockers
	Report

ShoWare Center
Attendance: 2,386
Referee: Shane Butler
March 10, 2018
7:05 PM PST
Game 2

San Diego Sockers	9–3	Tacoma Stars
	Report

Valley View Casino Center
Attendance: 3,421
Referee: Ron Cory
March 10, 2018
10:00 PM PST
Mini-Game

San Diego Sockers	6–2	Tacoma Stars
	Report

Valley View Casino Center
Attendance: 3,421
Referee: Ron Cory

San Diego wins series 2–1

==== Western Conference Final ====
March 18, 2018
5:05 PM MDT

Monterrey Flash	6–4	San Diego Sockers
	Report

Arena Monterrey
Attendance: 6,086
Referee: Ryan Cigich

=== Ron Newman Cup Final ===
March 25, 2018
5:05 PM MDT

Monterrey Flash	3–4	Baltimore Blast
	Report

Arena Monterrey
Attendance: 8,220
Referee: Rich Grady

== Statistics ==
=== Top scorers ===
Rank	Scorer	Club	Games	Goals	Assists	Points
1	Franck Tayou	Sonora Soles	22	71	11	82
2	Ian Bennett	Milwaukee Wave	22	50	14	64
3	Leo Gibson	Kansas City Comets	22	30	28	58
4	Kraig Chiles	San Diego Sockers	19	38	18	56
5	Joey Tavernese	Syracuse Silver Knights	22	28	26	54
6	Gordy Gurson	Cedar Rapids Rampage	22	30	19	49
7	Christian Gutierrez	El Paso Coyotes	22	36	12	48
8	Max Ferdinand	Milwaukee Wave	22	15	31	46
9	Ricardo De Queiroz Diegues	Florida Tropics SC	22	28	16	44
10	Tony Donatelli	Baltimore Blast	20	22	21	43

== Awards ==
=== Individual awards ===
Award	Name	Team
League MVP	Franck Tayou	Sonora Soles
Goalkeeper of the Year	Chris Toth	San Diego Sockers
Defender of the Year	Robert Acosta	St. Louis Ambush
Co-Rookie of the Year	Edgar González	Monterrey Flash
Co-Rookie of the Year	Philip Lund	Tacoma Stars
Coach of the Year	Mariano Bollella	Monterrey Flash
Aaron Susi Trophy (Playoff MVP)	William Vanzela	Baltimore Blast

=== All-League First Team ===
Name	Position	Team
Max Ferdinand	F	Milwaukee Wave
Franck Tayou	F	Sonora Soles
Ian Bennett	M	Milwaukee Wave
Robert Acosta	D	St. Louis Ambush
Pat Healey	D	Baltimore Blast
Chris Toth	GK	San Diego Sockers

=== All-League Second Team ===
Name	Position	Team
Kraig Chiles	F	San Diego Sockers
Joey Tavernese	F	Syracuse Silver Knights
Tony Donatelli	M	Baltimore Blast
Damian Garcia	D	Monterrey Flash
John Sosa	D	San Diego Sockers
Josh Lemos	GK	Milwaukee Wave

=== All-League Third Team ===
Name	Position	Team
Leo Gibson	F	Kansas City Comets
Gordy Gurson	M	Cedar Rapids Rampage
Christian Gutierrez	M	El Paso Coyotes
Adriano Dos Santos	D	Baltimore Blast
Darren Toby	D	Syracuse Silver Knights
Boris Pardo	GK	San Diego Sockers

=== All-Rookie Team ===
Name	Position	Team
Edgar González	F	Monterrey Flash
Adrian Perez	F	Ontario Fury
Philip Lund	M	Tacoma Stars
Manuel Aragon	D	Sonora Soles
Marco Nascimento	D	Baltimore Blast
Rainer Hauss	GK	Cedar Rapids Rampage
