= 2019–20 Major Arena Soccer League season =

Twelfth season of the Major Arena League

Major Arena Soccer League
- Season: 2019–20
- Champions: Monterrey Flash (West), Florida Tropics (East)
- Matches: 179
- Goals: 2,289 (12.79 per match)
- Top goalscorer: Franck Tayou (44 goals)
- Biggest home win: Monterrey Flash 14–1 Dallas Sidekicks (December 2, 2019)
- Biggest away win: Rochester Lancers 4–17 Florida Tropics SC (January 3, 2020)
- Highest scoring: 24 goals Rochester Lancers 8–16 St. Louis Ambush (February 1, 2020)
- Longest winning run: 13 Games: Monterrey Flash (11/22/19–1/17/2020)
- Longest losing run: 21 Games: Rochester Lancers (11/29/19–3/7/20)
- Total attendance: 454,670 (1 match did not report attendance)
- Average attendance: 2,540
- All statistics correct as of July 11, 2020.

The 2019–20 Major Arena Soccer League season is the twelfth season for the league. The league adopted a new format during the offseason, merging the four divisions into two conferences and eliminating the divisional format. On 12 March 2020, the league announced they would end the regular season early due to the COVID-19 pandemic outbreak. On July 1, 2020, MASL announced that the Board of Directors had voted to conclude the 2019–20 season with the recognition of the Monterrey Flash and Florida Tropics being the winners of the Western and Eastern Conferences, respectively.

== Changes from 2018-19 ==
Expansion

- Mesquite Outlaws

Folded

- Mississauga MetroStars

Moved to MASL 2

- El Paso Coyotes
- RGV Barracudas FC

Returning

- Sonora Suns
- Rochester Lancers

Change in season format

On July 19, 2019, the MASL announced the following changes for the 2019–20 season.

- Teams will be divided into two conferences (Eastern and Western), rather than four divisions.
- All playoff matchups will follow the best of three format, with the third game being a mini-game following game #2, if the series is tied.

== Standings ==
As of March 12, 2020
2019-20 League Championship
2019-20 Playoff Team
(Bold) Division Winner
(Italic) Defending Champion o-Eliminated from playoffs x-clinched playoff spot

=== Eastern Conference ===
Pos	Team	Pld	W	L	GF	GA	GD	PCT	GB
1	Florida Tropics SC—x	21	18	3	173	86	+87	.857	+4
2	Milwaukee Wave	20	14	6	157	96	+61	.700	+0.5
3	Utica City FC	20	14	6	141	106	+35	.700	+0.5
4	Baltimore Blast	23	15	8	175	104	+71	.652	—
5	Harrisburg Heat	21	13	8	150	115	+35	.619	1
6	Kansas City Comets-o	21	10	11	145	136	+9	.476	4
7	St. Louis Ambush-o	21	9	12	126	168	−42	.429	5
8	Orlando SeaWolves-o	20	1	19	88	202	−114	.050	12.5
9	Rochester Lancers-o	22	1	21	79	235	−156	.045	13.5

Updated to match(es) played on March 12, 2020. Source: MASL

Tiebreakers are as follows: Win%, Head to Head, Goal Differential, Wins, Losses.

=== Western Conference ===
Pos	Team	Pld	W	L	GF	GA	GD	PCT	GB
1	Monterrey Flash—y	22	20	2	196	111	+85	.909	+9
2	San Diego Sockers-x	21	15	6	124	104	+20	.714	+4.5
3	Ontario Fury	21	12	9	137	115	+22	.571	+1.5
4	Sonora Suns	22	11	11	173	154	+19	.500	—
5	Tacoma Stars	20	8	12	112	124	−12	.400	2
6	Turlock Cal Express	20	8	12	112	128	−16	.400	2
7	Mesquite Outlaws-o	21	7	14	109	123	−14	.333	3.5
8	Dallas Sidekicks-o	22	3	19	92	178	−86	.136	8

Updated to match(es) played on March 12, 2020. Source: MASL

Tiebreakers are as follows: Win%, Head to Head, Goal Differential, Wins, Losses

== Statistics ==
=== Top scorers ===
Rank	Scorer	Club	Games	Goals	Assists	Points
1	Franck Tayou	Ontario Fury	21	47	18	65
2	Leo Gibson	Kansas City Comets	20	29	31	60
3	Vini Dantas	Baltimore Blast	22	37	17	54
4	Ian Bennett	Milwaukee Wave	20	44	7	51
5	Brayan Aguilar	Monterrey Flash	20	33	15	48
6	Ricardo Carvalho	Florida Tropics SC	21	23	23	46
7	Tony Donatelli	Baltimore Blast	23	22	23	45
8	Max Ferdinand	Milwaukee Wave	20	17	27	44
9	Enrique Cañez	Sonora Suns	21	33	10	43
10	Nick Perera	Tacoma Stars	20	22	20	42

== Playoffs ==
Top 4 teams from both conferences qualify. Teams seeded 1st get to choose which lower seeded opponent from their conference they will face in the opening round. All rounds of the playoffs, including the championship finals, are best 2 of 3, with the 3rd game being a 15-minute mini-game, if required. On May 21, MASL announced that it intends on having playoffs, with modifications such as one centralized location, and a five-day training camp period. However, on June 3, MASL announced that the plan from May 21 was no longer being implemented, due to logistical difficulties as well as any positives being outweighed by the negatives. With the announcement of the Flash and Tropics winning their conferences, the 2020 season concluded with no playoffs.

== End-of-season awards ==
MASL announced their end of season awards schedule would start on the 8th of April with the All-MASL Honorable Mentions team and culminate on the 18th of April with the MVP award.
