= Uzi Tayou =

Cameroonian footballer

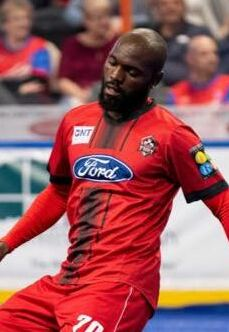
- Tayou in 2022

Personal information
- Date of birth: 28 April 1989 (age 37)
- Place of birth: Buea, Cameroon
- Height: 6 ft 3 in (1.91 m)
- Position: Defender

Team information
- Current team: St. Louis Ambush
- Number: 70

College career
Years	Team	Apps	(Gls)
2008	Tacoma Titans		
2009	Garden City Broncbusters		
2010–2011	West Virginia Mountaineers		

Senior career*
Years	Team	Apps	(Gls)
2012	Real Maryland	9	(0)
2013	Northern Virginia Royals	8	(0)
2013	NJ-LUSO Parma	1	(0)
2012–2015	Las Vegas Legends (indoor)	29	(9)
2015–2016	Baltimore Blast (indoor)	16	(4)
2016–2018	Soles de Sonora (indoor)	31	(7)
2017–2018	FC Wichita	20	(?)
2018	Tulsa Roughnecks	6	(0)
2018–2019	Monterrey Flash (indoor)	16	(2)
2019	FC Wichita	6	(0)
2021	→ Wichita Wings (loan; indoor)	8	(4)
2019	Golden State Force	0	(0)
2019–2023	Empire Strykers (indoor)	58	(3)
2023–2024	Texas Outlaws (indoor)	21	(9)
2024–	St. Louis Ambush (indoor)	1	(0)
- * Club domestic league appearances and goals as of 30 November 2024

Uzi Tayou (born 28 April 1989) is a Cameroonian footballer who currently plays for the St. Louis Ambush of the Major Arena Soccer League. Tayou won the MASL Championship with the Baltimore Blast in 2016.

During his career in the league, Tayou has played for the Las Vegas Legends, Baltimore Blast, Soles de Sonora, and Monterrey Flash, Empire Strykers (formerly the Ontario Fury), and Texas Outlaws. He has reached the MASL Ron Newman Cup Finals with three different teams and earned accolades including being named to the All-Star Game, Defensive Player of the Year, and a league leader in blocked shots.

In 2023, Tayou once again represented Team USA with the United States National Arena Soccer Team in international competitions, including the WMF World Cup.

Tayou moved to from his native Cameroon to Las Vegas in 2006 and rose to prominence with a successful college soccer career at West Virginia University, which included two NCAA Tournaments. Tayou signed his first indoor professional contract with the MASL in 2012, and then his first outdoor professional contract in 2018, joining the Tulsa Roughnecks of the United Soccer League. In May 2021, Uzi and his brother Franck joined the Wichita Wings for the remainder of the Major Arena Soccer League 2 season.

He is the older brother of fellow professional soccer player and MASL MVP Franck Tayou.

For his ongoing work to help communities off the field, Tayou was awarded the Ed Tepper Humanitarian of the Year for the 2018-19 season. He also pioneered a health and fitness program for residents of National CORE affordable housing communities in the Inland Empire. He is a soccer coach and the founder and director of 1570 FC and 1570 FC Junior Academy.
