= Franck Tayou =

American footballer (born 1990)

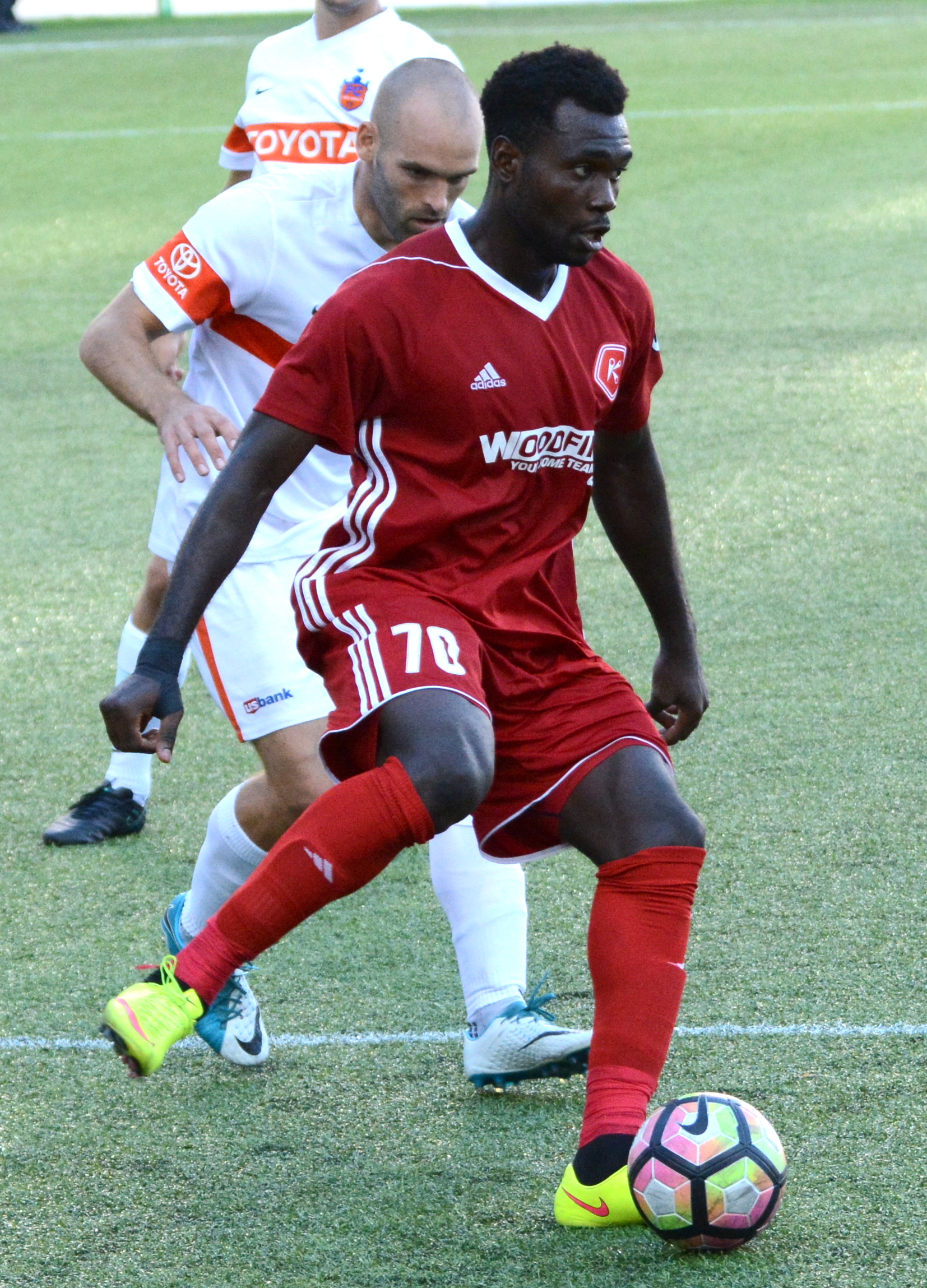
- Tayou with the Richmond Kickers in 2017

Personal information
- Date of birth: April 16, 1990 (age 36)
- Place of birth: Cameroon
- Height: 1.86 m (6 ft 1 in)
- Position: Forward

Team information
- Current team: [[ |Milwaukee Wave]]

College career
| Years | Team | Apps | (Gls) |
| 2010–2011 | West Virginia Mountaineers | | |

Senior career*
| Years | Team | Apps | (Gls) |
| 2012 | Real Maryland Monarchs | 3 | (0) |
| 2012–2013 | Las Vegas Legends (indoor) | 16 | (20) |
| 2013 | NJ-LUSO Parma | 2 | (0) |
| 2013 | Northern Virginia Royals | 9 | (8) |
| 2013–2014 | Tulsa Revolution (indoor) | 10 | (14) |
| 2014–2015 | Oxford City FC of Texas (indoor) | 13 | (13) |
| 2015 | Las Vegas Mobsters | 8 | (2) |
| 2014–2015 | Las Vegas Legends (indoor) | 6 | (4) |
| 2015–2018 | Soles de Sonora (indoor) | 62 | (175) |
| 2016 | San Antonio FC | 17 | (5) |
| 2017 | Richmond Kickers | 13 | (1) |
| 2018 | FC Wichita | 6 | (7) |
| 2018 | Fresno FC | 12 | (1) |
| 2018–2019 | Monterrey Flash (indoor) | 24 | (50) |
| 2019 | FC Wichita | 5 | (2) |
| 2019 | Golden State Force | 0 | (0) |
| 2019–2023 | Empire Strykers (indoor) | 56 | (94) |
| 2021 | → Wichita Wings (loan; indoor) | 6 | (10) |
| 2023 | Los Angeles Force | 4 | (1) |
| 2023–2024 | Utica City (indoor) | 22 | (30) |
| 2024– | St. Louis Ambush (indoor) | 1 | (0) |

International career
- United States beach
- United States national futsal team
- United States arena
- * Club domestic league appearances and goals as of 30 November 2024

Franck Tayou (born April 16, 1990) is a Cameroon-born-American soccer player who currently plays for the Milwaukee Wave of the Major Arena Soccer League.

== Career ==
Tayou began his college soccer career at West Virginia University in 2010 where he played for two years, leading the Mountaineers to the NCAA tournament in both seasons. Tayou has had a successful career playing indoor soccer in the Major Arena Soccer League. He is a 4-time MASL MVP, with his first vote for Most Valuable Player coming in the 2015/2016 MASL, after an outstanding season with Mexican club Soles de Sonora, whom he led to the Ron Newman Cup final. They eventually lost to the Baltimore Blast. He led the league with 47 goals and 62 points in 20 games. He was also the leading goal scorer of the playoff series.

Tayou has represented the US Futsal National team in the Umag Nations Cup in Croatia in 2022, as well as the CONCACAF tournament which took place in Costa Rica. He has also represented the United States in futsal and arena soccer.

Tayou has played with numerous Premier Development League sides, including Real Maryland Monarchs, NJ-LUSO Parma, Northern Virginia Royals and Las Vegas Mobsters. Tayou signed with United Soccer League side San Antonio FC on June 16, 2016. On June 16, 2017, Tayou signed with the Richmond Kickers of the USL. After a spell with NPSL side FC Wichita, Tayou joined USL club Fresno FC on June 15, 2018.

Along with his outdoor soccer experience, Tayou has been in the Major Arena Soccer League, where he has played indoor soccer professionally with Las Vegas Legends, Tulsa Revolution and Soles de Sonora. He has won four MASL Most Valuable Player Awards and scored 323 goals in just 152 games.

In May 2021, Franck and his brother Uzi joined the Wichita Wings for the remainder of the Major Arena Soccer League 2 season.

Tayou joined Utica City FC in November 2023 in a trade that saw Stefan Mijatovic and Quenton Swift join the Empire Strykers.

Tayou signed with the St. Louis Ambush on October 1, 2024.

Following the team's game on January 13, 2025, Tayou informed the players and coaching staff in the locker room that he was leaving the team.

The St. Louis Ambush suspended Franck Tayou on January 14, 2025 for conduct detrimental to the team and failure to meet contractual obligations.

The St. Louis Ambush would announce a trade on February 21, 2025 that would send Tayou to the Milwaukee Wave in exchange for Robert Williamson and Cash.

=== Honors ===
Individual

- MASL MVP(4): 2015-16, 2016-17, 2017-18, 2019-20
- All-MASL First Team: 2015-16, 2016-17, 2017-18, 2019-20
- All-MASL Second Team: 2018-19
- Ed Tepper Humanitarian of the Year: 2018-19
