= 2015–16 Major Arena Soccer League season =

Major Arena Soccer League
- Season: 2015–16
- Champions: Baltimore Blast
- Matches: 198
- Goals: 2,630 (13.28 per match)
- Top goalscorer: Franck Tayou (47 goals)
- Longest winning run: 11 Games: Baltimore Blast (11/7-1/9); Sonora Suns (11/7-1/17)
- Longest losing run: 18 games: Harrisburg Heat (11/6-2/27)
- Highest attendance: 9,442; CHI @ BAL (November 7)
- Lowest attendance: 104; BAJ @ SAL (February 5)
- Average attendance: 2,405

The 2015–16 Major Arena Soccer League season was the eighth season for the league and the second since six teams from the former Major Indoor Soccer League defected to what was formerly called the Professional Arena Soccer League. The regular season started on October 24, 2015, and ended on March 4, 2016. Each team played a 20-game schedule. It was also the 38th season of professional indoor soccer in the United States.

== Teams ==
Many of the 22 teams that completed the 2014–15 season returned for the 2015–16 season. Teams not returning this season include Rochester Lancers, Wichita B-52s, Tulsa Revolution, and Monterrey Flash. In April 2015, Baltimore Blast owner Ed Hale announced that his team was withdrawing from the MASL to form a new league. No other teams announced their departure and the proposed new league never formed. The Blast quietly rejoined the league after agreeing to pay a fine. The Detroit Waza relocated to Flint, Michigan, and are operating this season as simply Waza Flo.

The expansion Sonora Suns based in Hermosillo, Connecticut-based Hartford City FC, Iowa-based Cedar Rapids Rampage, and Tijuana-based Atletico Baja were formally accepted for membership in the MASL. The fledgling Youngstown Nighthawks based in Ohio aimed to join the league but encountered financial issues.

On October 28, 2015, the MASL announced that Hartford City FC would not be permitted to enter the league this season and began league-wide schedule changes to replace the failed franchise. A new ownership group hoped to revive the team for the 2016–17 season.

Unlike the prior season where some Eastern Division teams played with a variable-point scoring system, for 2015–16 the whole MASL played with standard soccer scoring using goals, not points.

== Standings ==
As of March 4, 2016
2015-16 League Championship
2015-16 Playoff Team
(Bold) Division Winner

=== Eastern Conference ===
Place	Team	GP	W	L	Pct	GF	GA	GB	Home	Road
Eastern Division
1	Baltimore Blast	19	15	4	.789	129	57	-	9-1	6-3
2	Syracuse Silver Knights	20	11	9	.550	120	113	4.5	7-3	4-6
3	Waza Flo	18	9	9	.500	101	119	5.5	5-3	4-6
4	Harrisburg Heat	19	1	18	.053	75	152	14.0	0-10	1-8
Central Division
1	Missouri Comets	20	17	3	.850	153	95	—	7-3	10-0
2	Chicago Mustangs	20	13	7	.650	152	123	4	7-3	6-4
3	Milwaukee Wave	20	13	7	.650	131	114	4	7-3	6-4
4	St. Louis Ambush	20	5	15	.250	104	138	12	3-7	2-8
5	Cedar Rapids Rampage	20	5	15	.250	117	160	12	3-7	2-8

=== Western Conference ===
Place	Team	GP	W	L	Pct	GF	GA	GB	Home	Road
Southwest Division
1	Las Vegas Legends	20	14	6	.700	141	106	—	8-2	6-4
2	Atletico Baja	20	12	8	.600	178	161	2	8-2	4-6
3	Brownsville Barracudas	20	8	12	.400	134	145	6	6-4	2-8
4	Saltillo Rancho Seco	20	7	13	.350	150	170	7	5-5	2-8
5	Sacramento Surge	20	3	17	.150	114	180	11	3-7	0-10
6	Turlock Express	20	3	17	.150	98	174	11	3-7	0-10
Pacific Division
1	Sonora Suns	20	17	3	.850	219	134	—	9-1	8-2
2	San Diego Sockers	20	13	7	.650	138	111	4	7-3	6-4
3	Tacoma Stars	20	13	7	.650	116	109	4	7-3	6-4
4	Ontario Fury	20	12	8	.600	146	135	5	7-3	5-5
5	Dallas Sidekicks	20	7	13	.350	114	134	10	4-6	3-7

== 2016 Ron Newman Cup ==
=== Playoff format ===
Top three finishers in each division qualify for the playoffs. The winner of the playoff between the second and third place teams will play the first place team for the division title.

Each round (including the Newman Cup Championship) will be a home and away series. Teams that win both games will advance. If the wins are split between the two teams, a fifteen-minute mini game will be played immediately after the second game to break the tie. The only exception will be the Eastern Division Semi-Final, where there will be a one-game playoff (Syracuse hosting Waza Flo) because of arena availability issues.

=== Eastern Conference Playoffs ===
==== Eastern Division Semi-Final ====
March 5, 2016
7:05 PM EST

Syracuse Silver Knights	5–3	Waza Flo
	Report

Oncenter War Memorial Arena
Attendance: 1,815
Referee: Tim Tyma

Syracuse advances to the Eastern Division Final.

==== Eastern Division Final ====
March 11, 2016
7:35 PM EST
Game 1

Baltimore Blast	6–5 (3 OT)	Syracuse Silver Knights
	Report

Royal Farms Arena
Attendance: 4,041
Referee: Joe Della Penna
March 13, 2016
4:05 PM EDT
Game 2

Syracuse Silver Knights	3–4	Baltimore Blast
	Report

Oncenter War Memorial Arena
Attendance: 2,042
Referee: Rich Grady

Baltimore wins series 2–0.

==== Central Division Semi-Final ====
March 5, 2016
3:05 PM CST
Game 1

Milwaukee Wave	7–2	Chicago Mustangs
	Report

UW–Milwaukee Panther Arena
Attendance: 3,475
March 6, 2016
6:05 PM CST
Game 2

Chicago Mustangs	7–2	Milwaukee Wave
	Report

Sears Centre
Attendance: 3,746
Referee: Ryan Cigich
March 6, 2016
9:05 PM CST
Mini-Game

Chicago Mustangs	0–2	Milwaukee Wave
	Report

Sears Centre
Attendance: 3,746
Referee: Shane Butler

Milwaukee wins series 2–1.

==== Central Division Final ====
March 11, 2016
7:05 PM CST
Game 1

Milwaukee Wave	5–10	Missouri Comets
	Report

UW–Milwaukee Panther Arena
Attendance: 2,717
March 13, 2016
5:05 PM CDT
Game 2

Missouri Comets	8–2	Milwaukee Wave
	Report

Silverstein Eye Centers Arena
Attendance: 3,004
Referee: Shane Butler

Missouri wins series 2–0.

==== Eastern Conference Final ====
March 24, 2016
7:05 CDT
Game 1

Missouri Comets	3–4 (OT)	Baltimore Blast
	Report

Silverstein Eye Centers Arena
Attendance: 3,011
Referee: Ryan Cigich
March 29, 2016
7:05 EDT
Game 2

Baltimore Blast	4–3 (2OT)	Missouri Comets
	Report

Royal Farms Arena
Attendance: 4,102
Referee: Rich Grady

Baltimore wins series 2–0

=== Western Conference Playoffs ===
==== Southwest Division Semi-Final ====
March 4, 2016
7:35 PM CST
Game 1

Brownsville Barracudas	5–4	Atletico Baja
	Report

Barracudas Sports Complex
Attendance: 1,168
Referee: Francisco Meraz
March 6, 2016
5:05 PM PST
Game 2

Atletico Baja	9–10 (OT)	Brownsville Barracudas
	Report

Unidad Deportiva Tijuana
Attendance: 1,760
Referee: Kia Depaneh

Brownsville wins series 2–0

==== Southwest Division Final ====
March 12, 2016
4:05 PM PST
Game 1

Brownsville Barracudas	5–11	Las Vegas Legends
	Report

Barracudas Sports Complex
Attendance: 1,183
Referee: Francisco Meraz
March 14, 2016
7:35 PM PDT
Game 2

Las Vegas Legends	11–9	Brownsville Barracudas
	Report

Las Vegas Sports Park
Attendance: 403
Referee: Ramiro Cruz

Las Vegas wins series 2–0

==== Pacific Division Semi-Final ====
March 2, 2016
7:35 PM PST
Game 1

Tacoma Stars	7–8 (2 OT)	San Diego Sockers
	Report; Report

ShoWare Center
Attendance: 2,036
Referee: Kia Depaneh
March 6, 2016
5:05 PM PST
Game 2

San Diego Sockers	11–3	Tacoma Stars
	Report

Valley View Casino Center
Attendance: 2,774
Referee: Ron Cory

San Diego wins series 2–0

==== Pacific Division Final ====
March 10, 2016
7:05 PM PST
Game 1

San Diego Sockers	5–10	Sonora Suns
	Report

Valley View Casino Center
Attendance: 2,200
Referee: Ryan Cigich
March 12, 2016
6:05 PM MST
Game 2

Sonora Suns	10–13	San Diego Sockers
	Report

Centro de Usos Múltiples
Attendance: 7,000
Referee: Kelly Mock
March 12, 2016
9:35 PM MST
Mini-Game

Sonora Suns	6–0	San Diego Sockers
	Report

Centro de Usos Múltiples
Attendance: 7,000
Referee: Kelly Mock

Sonora wins series 2–1.

==== Western Conference Final ====
March 23, 2016
7:05 MDT
Game 1

Sonora Suns	9–13	Las Vegas Legends
	Report

Centro de Usos Múltiples
Attendance: 6,841
Referee: Kia Depaneh
March 24, 2016
7:05 MDT
Game 2

Sonora Suns	13–10	Las Vegas Legends
	Report

Centro de Usos Múltiples
Attendance: 7,487
Referee: Kia Depaneh
March 24, 2016
10:45 PM MDT
Mini-Game

Sonora Suns	1–0 (2 OT)	Las Vegas Legends
	Report

Centro de Usos Múltiples
Attendance: 7,487
Referee: Kia Depaneh

Sonora wins series 2–1.

=== Newman Cup Championship ===
April 10, 2016
6:05 PM EDT
Game 1

Baltimore Blast	7–4	Sonora Suns
	Report

Royal Farms Arena
Attendance: 7,243
Referee: Rich Grady
April 15, 2016
8:05 PM PDT
Game 2

Sonora Suns	13–14 (OT)	Baltimore Blast
	Report

Centro de Usos Múltiples
Attendance: 8,324
Referee: Ryan Cigich

Baltimore wins Newman Cup 2–0.

== Statistics ==
=== Top scorers ===
Rank	Scorer	Club	Games	Goals	Assists	Points
1	(United States) Franck Tayou	Sonora Suns	20	47	15	62
2	(United States) Kraig Chiles	San Diego Sockers	18	28	27	55
3	(Canada) Vahid Assadpour	Missouri Comets	20	23	27	50
4	(Brazil) Mauricio Salles	Ontario Fury	20	30	16	46
4	(Mexico) Efrain Martinez	Chicago Mustangs	20	21	25	46
6	(Canada) Ian Bennett	Milwaukee Wave	20	37	7	44
6	(Liberia) Leo Gibson	Missouri Comets	18	21	23	44
8	(Mexico) Victor Baez	Saltillo Rancho Seco	20	28	15	43
9	(United States) Moises Gonzalez	Brownsville Barracudas	20	34	8	42
9	(Brazil) Hewerton Moreira	Cedar Rapids Rampage	20	13	29	42

Last updated on March 4, 2016. Source: "Scoring Leaders". Major Arena Soccer League.

== Awards ==
=== Individual awards ===
Award	Name	Team
League MVP	Franck Tayou	Sonora Suns
Goalkeeper of the Year	Danny Waltman	Tacoma Stars
Defender of the Year	Pat Healey	Baltimore Blast
Rookie of the Year	Alejandro Leyva	Sonora Suns
Coach of the Year	Darren Sawatzky	Tacoma Stars
Aaron Susi Trophy (Playoff MVP)	Lucas Roque	Baltimore Blast

=== All-League First Team ===
Name	Position	Team
Kraig Chiles	F	San Diego Sockers
Franck Tayou	F	Sonora Suns
Vahid Assadpour	M	Missouri Comets
Damian Garcia	D	Sonora Suns
Eric Guzman	D	Las Vegas Legends
Danny Waltman	GK	Tacoma Stars

=== All-League Second Team ===
Name	Position	Team
Leo Gibson	F	Missouri Comets
Mauricio Salles	F	Ontario Fury
Ian Bennett	M	Milwaukee Wave
Victor Baez	D	Saltillo Rancho Seco
Pat Healey	D	Baltimore Blast
William Vanzela	GK	Baltimore Blast

=== All-League Third Team ===
Name	Position	Team
Efrain Martinez	F	Chicago Mustangs
Max Ferdinand	M	Milwaukee Wave
Moises Gonzalez	M	Brownsville Barracudas
Luis Ortega	D	Chicago Mustangs
John Sosa	D	Missouri Comets
Boris Pardo	GK	Missouri Comets

=== All-Rookie Team ===
Name	Position	Team
Alejandro Leyva	F	Sonora Suns
Adolfo Bautista	F	Chicago Mustangs
Mike Ramos	M	Tacoma Stars
Thiago Gonçalves	D	Waza Flo
Roberto Medina	D	Sonora Suns
Andrew Coughlin	GK	Syracuse Silver Knights
