= 2018–19 Major Arena Soccer League season =

Major Arena Soccer League
- Season: 2018–19
- Champions: Milwaukee Wave
- Matches: 204
- Goals: 2,528 (12.39 per match)
- Top goalscorer: Franck Tayou (50)
- Biggest home win: San Diego Sockers 13–2 Turlock Express (March 1, 2019)
- Biggest away win: Turlock Express 1–12 San Diego Sockers (February 8, 2019)
- Highest scoring: 20 goals (twice); Baltimore Blast 14–6 Mississauga MetroStars (January 20, 2019); Turlock Express 12–8 El Paso Coyotes (February 15, 2019)
- Longest winning run: 21 Games: San Diego Sockers (12/26/18–4/13/19)
- Longest losing run: 12 Games: Turlock Express (11/30/18–1/27/2019)
- Total attendance: 462,670
- Average attendance: 2,268
- All statistics correct as of April 14, 2019.

The 2018–19 Major Arena Soccer League season was the eleventh season for the league. The regular season started on November 30, 2018, and ended on April 14, 2019. Each team played a 24-game schedule.

== Changes from 2017–18 ==
Expansion

- Mississauga MetroStars
- Orlando SeaWolves

Relocation

- Syracuse Silver Knights to Utica City FC

Returning

- Dallas Sidekicks

On Hiatus

- Soles de Sonora

Folded

- Cedar Rapids Rampage

== Standings ==
Playoff team
League champion

(Bold) Division Winner

=== Eastern Conference ===
==== Eastern Division ====
Pos	Team	Pld	W	L	GF	GA	GD	PCT	GB
1	Utica City FC	24	17	7	162	119	+43	.708	—
2	Baltimore Blast	24	17	7	145	104	+41	.708	—
3	Harrisburg Heat	24	11	13	146	158	−12	.458	6
4	Mississauga MetroStars	24	4	20	120	184	−64	.167	13

Source: MASL

==== South Central Division ====
Pos	Team	Pld	W	L	GF	GA	GD	PCT	GB
1	Milwaukee Wave	24	21	3	187	97	+90	.875	+8
2	Kansas City Comets	24	13	11	174	163	+11	.542	—
3	St. Louis Ambush	24	10	14	142	171	−29	.417	3
4	Orlando SeaWolves	24	9	15	141	174	−33	.375	4
5	Florida Tropics SC	24	6	18	125	172	−47	.250	7

Source: MASL

=== Western Conference ===
==== Southwest Division ====
Pos	Team	Pld	W	L	GF	GA	GD	PCT	GB
1	Monterrey Flash	24	19	5	176	121	+55	.792	+3
2	RGV Barracudas FC	24	16	8	159	103	+56	.667	—
3	Dallas Sidekicks	24	9	15	123	173	−50	.375	7
4	El Paso Coyotes	24	3	21	133	219	−86	.125	13

Source: MASL

==== Pacific Division ====
Pos	Team	Pld	W	L	GF	GA	GD	PCT	GB
1	San Diego Sockers	24	23	1	185	92	+93	.958	+11
2	Tacoma Stars	24	12	12	162	144	+18	.500	—
3	Ontario Fury	24	11	13	147	118	+29	.458	1
4	Turlock Express	24	3	21	101	216	−115	.125	9

Source: MASL

== 2019 Ron Newman Cup ==
=== Format ===
The top two teams from each division qualified for the post-season. The Division Finals were a 2-game home and home series, with a 15-minute mini-game played immediately after Game 2 if the series was tied. The Conference Finals and Championship were single elimination.

=== Eastern Conference Playoffs ===
==== Eastern Division Final ====
April 20, 2019
6:00 PM EDT
Game 1

Baltimore Blast	9–12	Utica City FC
Raley 03'; Thomas 17'; Dantas 31', 32'; Guernsey 33', 52'; Dos Santos 40'; Deasel 46'; Donatelli 52'	Report	Gonzaga 16'; Callahan 18'; Salles 20', 22', 32', 34'; Schindler 20'; Tavernese 21', 59'; Bourdeau 36'; Jelovac 55'; Vitale 59'

SECU Arena
Attendance: 2,926
Referee: Kyle Trimble
April 22, 2019
6:30 PM EDT
Game 2

Utica City FC	3–7	Baltimore Blast
Salles 1'; Ubiparipovic 34', 57'	Report	Hoxie 1', 17', 20'; Donatelli 3', 38'; Dantas 43' (pen.); Dos Santos 47'

Adirondack Bank Center
Attendance: 3,856
Referee: Rich Grady
April 22, 2019
9:30 PM EDT
Mini-Game

Utica City FC	1–2	Baltimore Blast
Jelovac 4'	Report	Hoxie 8'; Dos Santos 13'

Adirondack Bank Center
Attendance: 3,856
Referee: Rich Grady

Baltimore wins series 2–1

==== South Central Division Final ====
April 18, 2019
7:35 PM CDT
Game 1

Kansas City Comets	2–5	Milwaukee Wave
	Report

Silverstein Eye Centers Arena
Attendance: 1,819
Referee: Shane Butler
April 20, 2019
2:05 PM CDT
Game 2

Milwaukee Wave	10–3	Kansas City Comets
	Report

UW-Milwaukee Panther Arena
Attendance: 3,032
Referee: Rich Grady

Milwaukee wins series 2–0

==== Eastern Conference Final ====
April 28, 2019
2:05 PM CDT

Milwaukee Wave	2–1	Baltimore Blast
	Report

UW-Milwaukee Panther Arena
Attendance: 3,678
Referee: Ryan Cigich

=== Western Conference Playoffs ===
==== Southwest Division Final ====
April 19, 2019
7:00 PM CDT
Game 1

RGV Barracudas FC	4–5	Monterrey Flash
	Report

State Farm Hidalgo Arena
Attendance: 2,542
Referee: Kyle Trimble
April 21, 2019
5:05 PM CDT
Game 2

Monterrey Flash	5–4 (OT)	RGV Barracudas FC
	Report

Arena Monterrey
Attendance: 2,520
Referee: Kia Dehpanah

Monterrey wins series 2–0

==== Pacific Division Final ====
April 19, 2019
7:30 PM PDT
Game 1

Tacoma Stars	3–6	San Diego Sockers
	Report

ShoWare Center
Attendance: 2,412
Referee: Ron Cory
April 20, 2019
7:00 PM PDT
Game 2

San Diego Sockers	7–6 (2OT)	Tacoma Stars
	Report

Pechanga Arena San Diego
Attendance: 3,307
Referee: Ryan Cigich

San Diego wins series 2–0

==== Western Conference Final ====
April 28, 2019
5:05 PM PDT

San Diego Sockers	3–4 (OT)	Monterrey Flash
	Report

Pechanga Arena San Diego
Attendance: 3,907
Referee: Rich Grady

=== Ron Newman Cup Final ===
May 5, 2019
5:05 PM CDT

Milwaukee Wave	5–2	Monterrey Flash
	Report

UW-Milwaukee Panther Arena
Attendance: 7,901
Referee: Ryan Cigich

== Statistics ==
=== Top scorers ===
Rank	Scorer	Club	Games	Goals	Assists	Points
1	Nick Perera	Tacoma Stars	24	39	41	80
2	Leo Gibson	Kansas City Comets	23	33	31	64
3	Franck Tayou	Monterrey Flash	24	50	13	63
4	Gordy Gurson	Orlando SeaWolves	24	34	24	58
5	Ian Bennett	Milwaukee Wave	21	47	10	57
6	Brandon Escoto	San Diego Sockers	24	32	23	55
7	Kraig Chiles	San Diego Sockers	19	35	14	49
7	Ricardo Carvalho	Harrisburg Heat	23	30	19	49
7	Hugo Puentes	El Paso Coyotes	22	27	22	49
10	Mike Ramos	Tacoma Stars	24	27	18	45

=== Playoff top scorers ===
Rank	Scorer	Club	Games	Goals	Assists	Points
1	Andrew Hoxie	Baltimore Blast	4	5	2	7
1	Brayan Aguilar	Monterrey Flash	4	5	2	7
1	Ian Bennett	Milwaukee Wave	4	6	1	7
4	Brandon Escoto	San Diego Sockers	3	3	3	6
5	Marcio Leite	Milwaukee Wave	4	3	2	5
5	Leonardo De Oliveira	San Diego Sockers	3	3	2	5
5	Vinicius Dantas	Baltimore Blast	4	3	2	5
5	Mauricio Salles	Utica City FC	3	5	0	5
5	Andre Hayne	Milwaukee Wave	4	5	0	5

== Awards ==
=== Individual awards ===
Award	Nominees	Name	Team
League MVP	Brandon Escoto (SD); Max Ferdinand (MKE); Nick Perera (TAC)	Nick Perera	Tacoma Stars
Goalkeeper of the Year	Josh Lemos (MKE); Boris Pardo (SD); William Vanzela (BAL)	Boris Pardo	San Diego Sockers
Defender of the Year	Adriano Dos Santos (BAL); Marcio Leite (MKE); Darren Toby (UTC)	Darren Toby	Utica City FC
Rookie of the Year	De Bray Holliman (ONT); Tavoy Morgan (HAR); Zach Reget (STL)	Zach Reget	St. Louis Ambush
Newcomer of the Year	Molham Babouli (MIS); Kevin Ellis (KC); Jermaine Jones (ONT)	Molham Babouli	Mississauga MetroStars
Coach of the Year	Ryan Hall (UTC); Giuliano Oliviero (MKE); Phil Salvagio (SD)	Phil Salvagio	San Diego Sockers
Aaron Susi Trophy (Playoff MVP)	N/A	Marcio Leite	Milwaukee Wave

=== All-League First Team ===
Name	Position	Team
Nick Perera	F	Tacoma Stars
Max Ferdinand	F	Milwaukee Wave
Brandon Escoto	M	San Diego Sockers
Adriano Dos Santos	D	Baltimore Blast
Darren Toby	D	Utica City FC
Boris Pardo	GK	San Diego Sockers

=== All-League Second Team ===
Name	Position	Team
Franck Tayou	F	Monterrey Flash
Ian Bennett	F	Milwaukee Wave
Jonatas Melo	M	Baltimore Blast
Marcio Leite	D	Milwaukee Wave
Cesar Cerda	D	San Diego Sockers
Josh Lemos	GK	Milwaukee Wave

=== All-League Third Team ===
Name	Position	Team
Leo Gibson	F	Kansas City Comets
Slavisa Ubiparipovic	F	Utica City FC
Tony Donatelli	M	Baltimore Blast
James Togbah	D	Kansas City Comets
Guerrero Pino	D	San Diego Sockers
William Vanzela	GK	Baltimore Blast
