= 2016–17 Major Arena Soccer League season =

Major Arena Soccer League
- Season: 2016–17
- Champions: Baltimore Blast
- Matches: 170
- Goals: 2,196 (12.92 per match)
- Top goalscorer: Franck Tayou (57 goals)
- Biggest home win: Sonora Suns 21–2 Dallas Sidekicks (February 16, 2017)
- Biggest away win: Atletico Baja 3–15 Sonora Suns (November 27, 2016)
- Highest scoring: Sonora Suns 18–15 Turlock Express (November 12, 2016)
- Longest winning run: 10 Games: Sonora Suns (11/5/16–1/21/17)
- Longest losing run: 20 Games: El Paso Coyotes (10/29/16–3/4/17 – full season)
- Highest attendance: 9,722; Baltimore Blast 5–2 Milwaukee Wave (February 4, 2017)
- Lowest attendance: 187; Atletico Baja 9-4 Tacoma Stars (December 4, 2016)
- Average attendance: 2,746

The 2016–17 Major Arena Soccer League season was the ninth season for the league and the third since six teams from the former Major Indoor Soccer League defected to what was formerly called the Professional Arena Soccer League. The regular season started on October 29, 2016, and ended on March 5, 2017. Each team played a 20-game schedule. The defending champions were the Baltimore Blast. The Blast repeated in 2016–17, defeating the Sonora Suns in the Ron Newman Cup, 2–1.

== Teams ==
Of the 20 teams that competed in the 2015–16 season, the Waza Flo, Las Vegas Legends, Brownsville Barracudas, Saltillo Rancho Seco, and Sacramento Surge did not return for the 2016–17 season. The Florida Tropics SC and El Paso Coyotes joined the MASL for this season, bringing the total number of teams in the league to 17.

In the offseason, the Baltimore Blast, Harrisburg Heat, St. Louis Ambush left the MASL, and joined the expansion Tropics to form the Indoor Professional League. The Blast, Heat and Ambush re-joined the MASL in August 2016, with the Tropics being considered an expansion franchise for the MASL. Additionally the Missouri Comets announced in September 2016 that they were renaming themselves the Kansas City Comets.

== Standings ==
Final as of March 6, 2017
2016-17 League Championship
2016-17 Playoff Team
(Bold) Division Winner

=== Eastern Conference ===
Place	Team	GP	W	L	Pct	GF	GA	GB	Home	Road
Eastern Division
1	Baltimore Blast	20	14	6	.700	113	69	—	8-2	6-4
2	Harrisburg Heat	20	10	10	.500	116	124	4	6-4	4-6
3	Florida Tropics SC	20	8	12	.400	99	138	6	6-4	2-8
4	Syracuse Silver Knights	20	8	12	.400	137	127	6	5-5	3-7
Central Division
1	Kansas City Comets	20	15	5	.750	142	92	—	8-2	7-3
2	Milwaukee Wave	20	13	7	.650	135	103	2	8-2	5-5
3	Cedar Rapids Rampage	20	12	8	.600	126	127	3	7-3	5-5
4	Chicago Mustangs	20	11	9	.550	124	136	4	4-6	7-3
5	St. Louis Ambush	20	1	19	.050	83	150	14	1-9	0-10

=== Western Conference ===
Place	Team	GP	W	L	Pct	GF	GA	GB	Home	Road
Southwest Division
1	Sonora Suns	20	17	3	.850	230	120	—	10-0	7-3
2	Atletico Baja	20	10	10	.500	134	167	7	7-3	3-7
3	Dallas Sidekicks	20	7	13	.350	138	144	10	5-5	2-8
4	El Paso Coyotes	20	0	20	.000	114	223	17	0-10	0-10
Pacific Division
1	San Diego Sockers	20	14	6	.700	149	90	—	9-1	5-5
2	Ontario Fury	20	12	8	.600	148	132	2	6-4	6-4
3	Tacoma Stars	20	10	10	.500	114	120	4	8-2	2-8
4	Turlock Express	20	8	12	.400	132	172	6	7-3	1-9

== 2017 Ron Newman Cup ==
The Ron Newman Cup playoffs began after the regular season ended on March 5, 2017. The top two teams from each division qualified for the post-season, with each round being a 2-game home and home series, with a 15-minute mini-game played immediately after Game 2 if the series is tied.

=== Eastern Conference Playoffs ===
==== Eastern Division Final ====
March 11, 2017
7:05 PM EST
Game 1

Baltimore Blast	4–5	Harrisburg Heat
	Report

Royal Farms Arena
Attendance: 4,214
Referee: Kyle Trimble
March 15, 2017
7:35 PM EDT
Game 2

Harrisburg Heat	4–7	Baltimore Blast
	Report

New Holland Arena
Attendance: 1,152
Referee: Shane Butler
March 15, 2017
10:00 PM EDT
Game 3

Harrisburg Heat	1–4	Baltimore Blast
	Report

New Holland Arena
Attendance: 1,152
Referee: Shane Butler

Baltimore wins series 2–1

==== Central Division Final ====
March 9, 2017
7:35 PM CST
Game 1

Kansas City Comets	7–6	Milwaukee Wave
	Report

Silverstein Eye Centers Arena
Attendance: 3,419
Referee: Brian Miller
March 12, 2017
2:05 PM CST
Game 2

Milwaukee Wave	7–5	Kansas City Comets
	Report

UW-Milwaukee Panther Arena
Attendance: 3,348
Referee: Rich Grady
March 12, 2017
4:40 PM CST
Game 3

Milwaukee Wave	3–2 (OT)	Kansas City Comets
	Report

UW-Milwaukee Panther Arena
Attendance: 3,348
Referee: Rich Grady

Milwaukee wins series 2–1

==== Eastern Conference Final ====
March 18, 2017
7:05 EDT
Game 1

Baltimore Blast	8–7 (OT)	Milwaukee Wave
	Report

Royal Farms Arena
Attendance: 3,225
Referee: Eduardo Hernadez
March 21, 2017
7:35 CDT
Game 2

Milwaukee Wave	8–4	Baltimore Blast
	Report

UW-Milwaukee Panther Arena
Attendance: 2,218
Referee: Brian Miller
March 21, 2017
8:55 CDT
Game 3

Milwaukee Wave	1–2	Baltimore Blast
	Report

UW-Milwaukee Panther Arena
Attendance: 2,218
Referee: Brian Miller

Baltimore wins series 2–1

=== Western Conference Playoffs ===
==== Southwest Division Final ====
March 8, 2017
8:05 PM CST
Game 1

Atletico Baja	7–10	Sonora Suns
	Report

Unidad Deportiva Tijuana
Attendance: 746
Referee: Angel Gutierrez
March 11, 2017
7:05 PM CST
Game 2

Sonora Suns	17–3	Atletico Baja
	Report

Centro de Usos Multiples
Attendance: 4,000
Referee: Omar Ramos

Sonora wins series 2–0

==== Pacific Division Final ====
March 12, 2017
5:05 PM PST
Game 1

San Diego Sockers	9–4	Ontario Fury
	Report

Valley View Casino Center
Attendance: 6,242
Referee: Ramiro Cruz
March 14, 2017
7:35 PM PST
Game 2

Ontario Fury	8–4	San Diego Sockers
	Report

Citizens Business Bank Arena
Attendance: 3,675
Referee: Kia Dehpanah
March 14, 2017
9:47 PM PST
Game 3

Ontario Fury	0–1	San Diego Sockers
	Report

Citizens Business Bank Arena
Attendance: 3,675
Referee: Kia Dehpanah

San Diego wins series 2–1

==== Western Conference Final ====
March 19, 2017
5:05 PDT
Game 1

San Diego Sockers	4–7	Sonora Suns
	Report

Valley View Casino Center
Attendance: 3,853
Referee: Ramiro Cruz
March 25, 2017
7:05 PDT
Game 2

Sonora Suns	11–10	San Diego Sockers
	Report

Centro de Usos Multiples
Attendance: 8,000
Referee: Kia Dehpanah

Sonora wins series 2–0

=== 2017 Ron Newman Cup Finals ===
April 7, 2017
8:05 EDT
Game 1

Baltimore Blast	2–4	Sonora Suns
	Report

Royal Farms Arena
Attendance: 6,701
Referee: Kyle Trimble
April 9, 2017
6:05 PDT
Game 2

Sonora Suns	8–9 (OT)	Baltimore Blast
	Report

Centro de Usos Multiples
Attendance: 8,000
Referee: Fernando Pena
April 9, 2017
9:05 PDT
Game 3

Sonora Suns	0–1	Baltimore Blast
	Report

Centro de Usos Multiples
Attendance: 8,000
Referee: Fernando Pena

Baltimore wins series 2–1

== Statistics ==
=== Top Scorers ===
Rank	Scorer	Club	Games	Goals	Assists	Points
1	Franck Tayou	Sonora Suns	20	57	15	72
2	Ian Bennett	Milwaukee Wave	20	53	11	64
3	Christian Gutierrez	Atletico Baja	20	51	11	62
4	Taylor Bond	Chicago Mustangs	20	40	14	54
t5	Kraig Chiles	San Diego Sockers	20	39	12	51
t5	Leonardo de Oliveira	Ontario Fury	19	31	20	51
7	Max Ferdinand	Milwaukee Wave	18	18	30	48
8	Cameron Brown	Dallas Sidekicks	19	29	16	45
t9	Kenardo Forbes	Syracuse Silver Knights	20	21	21	42
t9	Enrique Canez	Sonora Suns	20	32	10	42
t9	Tony Donatelli	Baltimore Blast	20	19	23	42

Last updated on March 6, 2017.

== Awards ==
=== Individual awards ===
Award	Name	Team
League MVP	Franck Tayou	Sonora Suns
Goalkeeper of the Year	Chris Toth	San Diego Sockers
Defender of the Year	Stephen Basso	Harrisburg Heat
Rookie of the Year	Stephen Paterson	Kansas City Comets
Coach of the Year	Denison Cabral	Harrisburg Heat
Aaron Susi Trophy (Playoff MVP)	Vini Dantas	Baltimore Blast

=== All-League First Team ===
Name	Position	Team
Max Ferdinand	F	Milwaukee Wave
Franck Tayou	F	Sonora Suns
Ian Bennett	M	Milwaukee Wave
John Sosa	D	Kansas City Comets
Stephen Basso	D	Harrisburg Heat
Chris Toth	GK	San Diego Sockers

=== All-League Second Team ===
Name	Position	Team
Christian Gutierrez	F	Atletico Baja
Kraig Chiles	F	San Diego Sockers
Taylor Bond	M	Chicago Mustangs
Damian Garcia	D	Soles de Sonora
Chris Mattingly	D	St. Louis Ambush
William Vanzela	GK	Baltimore Blast

=== All-League Third Team ===
Name	Position	Team
Victor Quiroz	F	San Diego Sockers
Kenardo Forbes	M	Syracuse Silver Knights
Vahid Assadpour	M	Kansas City Comets
Ernesto Luna	D	Atletico Baja
Stephen Paterson	D	Kansas City Comets
Leonardo de Oliviera	GK	Ontario Fury

=== All-Rookie Team ===
Name	Position	Team
Lucas Teixeria	F	Florida Tropics SC
Elton de Oliveira	D	Baltimore Blast
Thiago Freitas	M	Harrisburg Heat
Manuel Rojo	D	Atletico Baja
Guerrero Pino	M	Kansas City Comets
Stephen Paterson	GK	Kansas City Comets

== Attendances ==
Team	Home average
Baltimore Blast	6,300
Soles de Sonora	4,900
Milwaukee Wave	3,794
Kansas City Comets	3,740
San Diego Sockers	3,688
Ontario Fury	3,024
Tacoma Stars	2,894
Florida Tropics	2,778
Chicago Mustangs	2,623
St. Louis Ambush	2,574
Dallas Sidekicks	2,300
Syracuse Silver Knights	2,300
El Paso Coyotes	2,205
Cedar Rapids Rampage	2,193
Harrisburg Heat	1,449
Turlock Express	556
Atletico Baja	319
