= 2026–27 Major Arena Soccer League season =

Major Arena Soccer League
- Season: 2026-27
- Matches: 108

The 2026–27 Major Arena Soccer League season is the nineteenth season of the league and the twelfth season as the Major Arena Soccer League. The regular season starts on November 27, 2026, and ends on April 4, 2027. Each team plays 24 games for a total 108 games within the season.

== Changes from 2025 to 2026 ==
The league added the Lehigh Valley Spirits, increasing the number of teams from 8 teams to 9 teams.

=== Teams ===
Stadiums and locations

2026 Teams
Team	Arena	Location	Capacity
Baltimore Blast	SECU Arena	Towson, Maryland	3,580
Empire Strykers	Toyota Arena	Ontario, California	9,736
Kansas City Comets	Cable Dahmer Arena	Independence, Missouri	5,800
Lehigh Valley Spirits	PPL Center	Allentown, Pennsylvania	8,500
Milwaukee Wave	UW-Milwaukee Panther Arena	Milwaukee, Wisconsin	9.500
San Diego Sockers	Frontwave Arena	Oceanside, California	5,500
St. Louis Ambush	Family Arena	St. Charles, Missouri	10,000
Tacoma Stars	accesso ShoWare Center	Kent, Washington	7,141
Utica City FC	Adirondack Bank Center	Utica, New York	3,999

Locations of teams for the 2025–26 MASL season
MASL Member Clubs

==== Returning ====
8 of the 12 teams that competed in the previous season returned for the 2026–27 season

- Baltimore Blast
- Empire Strykers
- Kansas City Comets
- Milwaukee Wave
- San Diego Sockers
- St. Louis Ambush
- Tacoma Stars
- Utica City FC

== Regular season ==
Playoff team
League champion

Pos	Team	Pld	W	OTW	OTL	L	GF	GA	GD	Pts
1	San Diego Sockers	0	0	0	0	0	0	0	0	0
2	Baltimore Blast	0	0	0	0	0	0	0	0	0
3	Milwaukee Wave	0	0	0	0	0	0	0	0	0
4	St. Louis Ambush	0	0	0	0	0	0	0	0	0
5	Kansas City Comets	0	0	0	0	0	0	0	0	0
6	Empire Strykers	0	0	0	0	0	0	0	0	0
7	Tacoma Stars	0	0	0	0	0	0	0	0	0
8	Utica City FC	0	0	0	0	0	0	0	0	0
9	Lehigh Valley Spirits	0	0	0	0	0	0	0	0	0

Teams get 3 points for a regulation win, 2 points for an overime/shootout win, 1 point for an overtime/shootout loss.

Tiebreaker format: Points > Regulation Wins > Wins > Head to Head > Goal Differential > Goals For > Goals Against

== 2027 Ron Newman Cup ==
Each round is played as a best-of-three series.

If a series is tied after two games, the teams play a "knockout game," a 15-minute single period following the end of game 2. In the finals, the teams play a full third game unless arena scheduling does not allow for one; a knockout game may be agreed upon by the teams in place of the full tiebreaker.

Quarterfinals
4
5
6
3

Semifinals
1
2

Finals

* represent overtime periods
