= Kansas City Comets =

Kansas City Comets may refer to:

- Kansas City Comets (1979–1991), a team in the original Major Indoor Soccer League from 1979 to 1991
- Kansas City Comets (2001–2005), formerly the Kansas City Attack, a team in the second Major Indoor Soccer League
- Kansas City Comets (2010–), originally the Missouri Comets, a professional soccer team that plays in the Major Arena Soccer League
