= Cedar Rapids Rampage =

- Full name: Cedar Rapids Rampage Soccer Club
- Founded: 2015
- Dissolved: 2018; 8 years ago
- Stadium: U.S. Cellular Center
- Capacity: 5,300
- Owner(s): Chris Kokalis; Bob Sullivan; Kenneth Moninski
- Coach: Ante Čop
- League: Major Arena Soccer League
- 2017-18: 2nd, Central Division; Playoffs: 1st Round
Home colors

The Cedar Rapids Rampage was an American professional indoor soccer franchise based in Cedar Rapids, Iowa. Founded in June 2015, the team made its debut in the Major Arena Soccer League with the 2015–16 season. The team's name and logo were revealed at a press conference on July 16, 2015.

The team shared its ownership group with the Cedar Rapids Titans of the Indoor Football League, and sponsored an outdoor team the Cedar Rapids Rampage United that were a part of the Premier League of America.

== History ==
Former Chicago Storm assistant and Rockford Rampage head coach Jeff Kraft was named the first head coach in franchise history. In the first home pre-season match in Cedar Rapids, the Rampage lost 11-6 to the St. Louis Ambush at the U.S. Cellular Center on October 30, 2015.

The first regular season MASL game in Rampage history was November 6, 2015 at the Missouri Comets. The game saw first goal in franchise history, scored by forward Elmo Neto. The Rampage went on to lose 8-7 in overtime. After an 0-7 start to the season (and two overtime losses), the Rampage got their first win in a 9-7 comeback victory over the Ambush. Cedar Rapids trailed 7-2 in the third quarter, but used the quickest hat-trick from start-to-finish in MASL history by forward Alex Megson (41 seconds from the first to the third goals) to get back in the game. Player/assistant coach Carlos “Chile” Farias scored the game-tying and game-winning goals. Midway through the season, the Rampage acquired forward Gordy Gurson, who would go on to become arguably the face of the franchise. A much improved side won four games the second half of the year and finished 5-15.

The 2016–17 Major Arena Soccer League season was a turn-around season for the club. Kraft was let go as head coach before the season, and Hewerton Moreira was promoted to replace him as a player-coach. Moreira went on to finish second in the MASL record books for assists in a season with 29, and the Rampage had their first winning record with a 12-8 mark, highlighted by wins over the Milwaukee Rampage and defending/eventual champions, Baltimore Blast. The Chicago Mustangs edged Cedar Rapids for the last playoff spot, and also beat the Rampage in a match that tied the league record for fewest goals total in a match with four scored (3-1).

With the Mustangs voluntarily relegating themselves to MASL2, the Central was cleared of the Rampage’s biggest nemesis for the 2017-18 Major Arena Soccer League season. Hewerton left to become the player-coach of St. Louis, and Jonathan Greenfield was promoted to role of player-coach. The Rampage started with three narrow losses before a run of five straight wins put them in contention for the Central Division title. A tumultuous December saw drama on and off the field. Bad weather, undesirable home dates, and sponsorship problems saw attendance dip. On the field, goalkeeper Brett Petricek was released and signed with the Comets, and Greenfield left to play for the Baltimore Blast. Former Chicago Riot goalkeeper and Rockford Rampage goalkeeper/assistant Ante Cop was hired as the new head coach. Cop lost his first match as head coach on December 31, 2017, 3-2 to the Baltimore Blast and his next three games after that. However, rookie goalkeeper Rainer Hauss and the rest of the team thrived under Cop, winning five of their last seven matches. In that stretch, they clinched their first ever playoff berth on February 16, 2018 with a 6-5 home win over the Baltimore Blast.

With reports that the team was for sale, and an availability conflict with the U.S. Cellular Center, the Rampage played their first “home” playoff match at The Odeum Expo Center in Villa Park, Illinois. The match is considered one of the greatest in Ron Newman Cup Playoffs history. The Rampage battled the Milwaukee Wave in a seesaw affair, including a Mario Alvarez hat-trick and a late game-tying goal from Osvaldo Rojas to send the game to overtime where the Rampage eventually lost, 9–8. The second leg in Milwaukee was also back and forth, with a double-brace of four goals by Gordy Gurson. However, Game 2 ended in another one-goal Wave win for Milwaukee to take the series. Gurson was named 3rd Team All-MASL and Hauss was named goalkeeper on the MASL All-Rookie Team.

The team folded in 2018, and ownership reformed with many of the same players in Florida as the Orlando SeaWolves.

== Year-by-year ==
Season	League	Record	Pct.	GF	GA	Finish	Playoffs	Avg. attendance
2015-16	MASL	5-15	.250	117	160	5th, Central	DNQ	2,772
2016-17	MASL	12-8	.600	126	127	3rd, Central	DNQ	2,193
2017-18	MASL	11-11	.500	146	144	2nd, Central	Lost Central Division Final (8-9 OT, 7-8)	1,518

== Personnel ==
=== 2017–18 ===
==== Active players ====
- As of 18 January 2018

Note: Flags indicate national team as defined under FIFA eligibility rules; some limited exceptions apply. Players may hold more than one non-FIFA nationality.

No.	Pos.	Nation	Player
-	DF	USA	Michael Scharf
2	DF	USA	Charlie Bales
3	FW	USA	Gordy Gurson (captain)
4	MF	USA	Robby Gunderson
5	DF	ECU	Jonnathan Pachar
7	MF	USA	Bobby Hurwitz
8	FW	BIH	Kenan Malicevic
9	FW	USA	Derek Huffman
10	MF	USA	Drew Russell
11	MF	USA	Mario Alvarez

No.	Pos.	Nation	Player
15	MF	BRA	Victor France
16	DF	USA	Sam Guernsey
19	FW	ENG	Alex Bradley
21	DF	MEX	Edwin Rojas
23	MF	USA	Mohamed Kenawy
32	GK	BRA	Rainer Hauss
77	FW	MEX	Osvaldo Rojas Rivera
88	DF	USA	Phibo Arriaga
89	DF	USA	Joshio "Yoshi" Sandoval

==== Inactive players ====
Note: Flags indicate national team as defined under FIFA eligibility rules; some limited exceptions apply. Players may hold more than one non-FIFA nationality.

No.	Pos.	Nation	Player
-	MF	BRA	Alencar Ventura Junior
00	GK	ITA	Patrizio Paradiso
20	DF	USA	Tony Walls

==== Notable former players ====
Note: Flags indicate national team as defined under FIFA eligibility rules; some limited exceptions apply. Players may hold more than one non-FIFA nationality.

No.	Pos.	Nation	Player
—	MF	BRA	Hewerton Moreira
—	DF	RSA	Jonathan Greenfield
—	DF	BRA	Jonatan Santos
—	DF	BRA	Pablo Da Silva
—	MF	CHI	Chile Farias
—	FW	USA	Jamar Beasley
—	FW	USA	Alex Megson
—	MF	USA	Pat Kelly
—	GK	USA	Brett Petricek

== Sponsors ==
Period	Kit manufacturer	Shirt sponsor
2015–2016	Kappa	None
2016–2017	Locust	Shop-Soccer.com
2017–2018	Nike	Miguel's Construction
