= Jaime Castrillón =

Colombian footballer (born 1983)

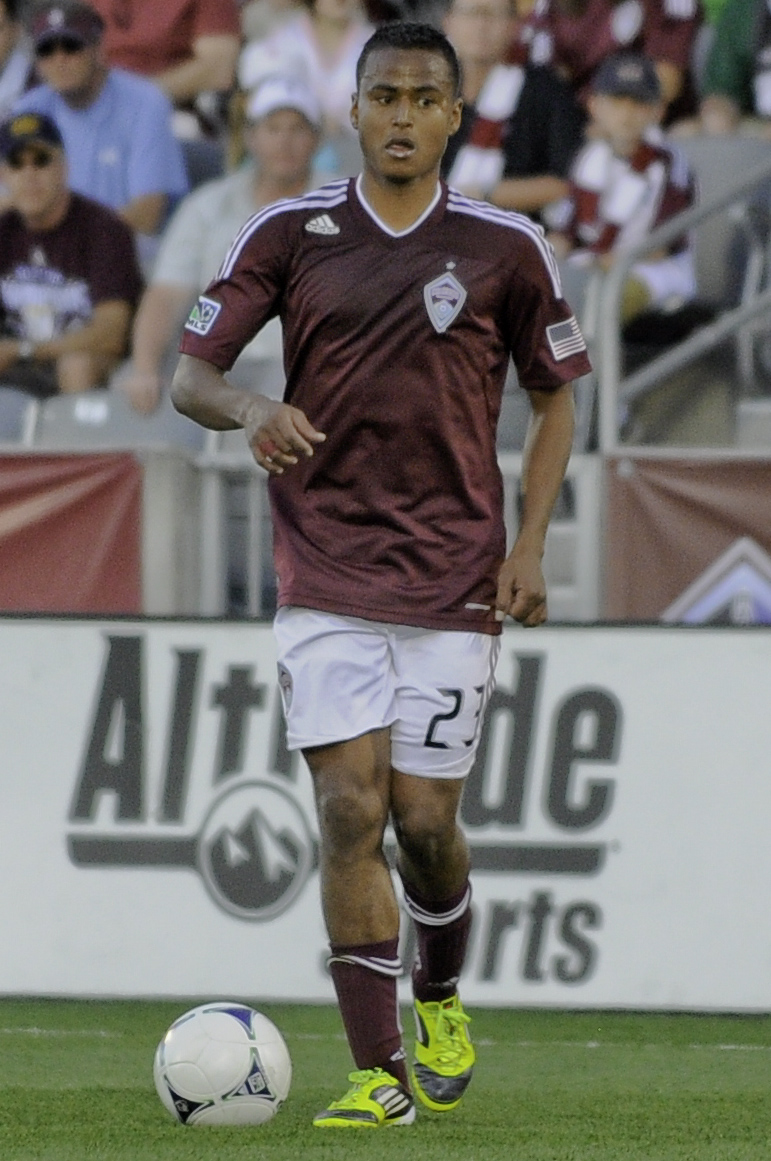
- Castrillón playing for Colorado Rapids on 4/1/12

Personal information
- Full name: Jaime Alberto Castrillón Vásquez
- Date of birth: April 5, 1983 (age 43)
- Place of birth: Puerto Nare, Colombia
- Height: 1.78 m (5 ft 10 in)
- Position: Midfielder

Team information
- Current team: Orlando SeaWolves

Senior career*
Years	Team	Apps	(Gls)
2002–2011	Independiente Medellín	276	(53)
2009	→ Nanchang Bayi (loan)	17	(3)
2010	→ Once Caldas (loan)	31	(5)
2012–2013	Colorado Rapids	41	(9)
2015	Jacksonville Armada FC	15	(2)
2016	Atlético Bucaramanga	19	(3)
2020	Orlando SeaWolves (indoor)	0	(0)

International career
2004–2007	Colombia	27	(4)
- * Club domestic league appearances and goals as of 30 January 2020

Jaime Castrillón (born 5 April 1983) is a Colombian former footballer who last played for the Orlando SeaWolves in the Major Arena Soccer League.

== Club career ==
Castrillón began his career with top Colombian side Independiente Medellín in 2002. As one of the top midfielders in Colombia he helped Medellín in capturing the Colombian Primera A title in 2002 and 2004. He appeared in almost 300 games with "El Poderoso de la Montaña" in his eight years with Medellín. In 2009, he left Colombia and joined Chinese club Nanchang Bayi, remaining at the club for one year. In 2010, he returned to Colombia, this time as the star signing for Once Caldas ahead of its participation in the 2010 Copa Libertadores, and was once again a key figure in helping his new club capture a Colombian Primera A title. In 2011, he returned to Medellin and had a fine season, scoring 11 goals for the club.

Castrillón signed with Major League Soccer club Colorado Rapids on January 25, 2012. On 4 December 2013, the Colorado Rapids announced that Castrillón would not return for the 2014 season.

On 18 November 2014, Castrillón signed with NASL club Jacksonville Armada for their inaugural 2015 season. He was released in December 2015.

In 2016 Castrillón joined Atlético Bucaramanga.

Castrillón signed with the Orlando SeaWolves of the Major Arena Soccer League in January 2020.

== International career ==
Castrillón made his debut for Colombia in 2004. He has been a prominent member of the national squad appearing in 27 games for his nation. He played in Copa América 2004 and Copa América 2007 scoring in the 2007 tournament. Also in the Colombia national team he scored 4 goals.

=== International goals ===
Scores and results list Colombia's goal tally first.

No	Date	Venue	Opponent	Score	Result	Competition
1.	17 July 2005	NRG Stadium, Houston, United States	Mexico	1–0	2–1	2005 CONCACAF Gold Cup
2.	2 July 2007	Estadio José Pachencho Romero, Maracaibo, Venezuela	Argentina	2–3	2–4	2007 Copa América
3.	5 July 2007	Estadio Metropolitano de Cabudare, Cabudare, Venezuela	United States	1–0	1–0	2007 Copa América
4.	22 August 2007	Dick's Sporting Goods Park, Commerce City, United States	Mexico	1–0	1–0	Friendly

== Honors ==
- Champions Colombian Primera A, 2002 and 2004 Independiente Medellín
- Champions Colombian Primera A, 2010 Once Caldas
- Champions Colombian C division, 2001 Independiente Medellín
- 3rd Place finish at 2003 FIFA World Youth Championship
- 4th-place finish with Colombia Senior team at Copa America 2003 Peru
