= 2014–15 Major Arena Soccer League season =

Major Arena Soccer League
- Season: 2014–15
- Champions: Monterrey Flash
- Matches: 223
- Top goalscorer: Leo Gibson; 48 Goals
- Longest winning run: 20 Games: Missouri Comets (entire season)
- Longest losing run: 12 games: Harrisburg Heat (11/1-1/24); Seattle/Tacoma (12/13-1/31)
- Highest attendance: 10,215; BAL @ ROC (March 1) (MASL Record)
- Lowest attendance: 70; BRO @ SAL (February 27)
- Average attendance: 2,432

The 2014–15 Major Arena Soccer League season was the seventh season for the league and the first since six teams from the former Major Indoor Soccer League defected to what was formerly called the Professional Arena Soccer League. The regular season started on October 25, 2014, and ended on March 1, 2015. Each team played a 20-game schedule. Also it was the 37th season of professional Division 1 indoor soccer in the US and the first season for the MASL as the top league.

== Standings ==
As of March 1, 2015
2014-15 League Championship
2014-15 Playoff Team
(Bold) Division Winner
Dropped Out in Mid-Season

=== Eastern Conference ===
Place	Team	GP	W	L	Pct	PF	PA	GB	Home	Road
Eastern Division
1	Baltimore Blast	20	18	2	.900	167	69	—	10-0	8-2
2	Syracuse Silver Knights	20	12	8	.600	142	116	6.0	7-3	5-5
3	Rochester Lancers	20	10	10	.500	136	115	8.0	6-4	4-6
4	Detroit Waza	20	4	16	.200	118	171	14.0	3-7	1-9
5	Harrisburg Heat	20	2	18	.100	104	216	16.0	2-8	0-10
Central Division
1	Missouri Comets	20	20	0	1.000	240	96	—	10-0	10-0
2	Milwaukee Wave	20	13	7	.650	160	108	7.0	7-3	6-4
3	Chicago Mustangs	20	11	9	.550	137	133	9.0	7-3	4-6
4	Wichita B-52s	20	10	10	.500	169	154	10.0	5-5	5-5
5	St. Louis Ambush	20	8	12	.400	136	146	12.0	4-6	4-6
6	Tulsa Revolution	20	2	18	.100	87	246	18.0	2-8	0-10

=== Western Conference ===
Place	Team	GP	W	L	Pct	PF	PA	GB	Home	Road
Southern Division
1	Monterrey Flash	20	18	2	.900	169	69	—	8-2	10-0
2	Dallas Sidekicks	20	14	6	.700	153	94	4.0	7-3	7-3
3	Oxford City FC of Texas	20	12	8	.600	151	134	6.0	6-4	6-4
4	Brownsville Barracudas	20	4	16	.200	107	185	14.0	3-8	1-8
5	Saltillo Rancho Seco	19	2	17	.105	121	201	15.5	2-8	0-9
--	Hidalgo La Fiera†	7	4	3	.571	48	52	—	1-1	3-2
Pacific Division
1	San Diego Sockers	20	16	4	.800	179	99	—	10-0	6-4
2	Ontario Fury	20	13	7	.650	169	145	3.0	7-3	6-4
3	Las Vegas Legends	20	13	7	.650	171	109	3.0	8-2	5-5
4	Turlock Express	20	9	11	.450	145	149	7.0	8-2	1-9
5	Seattle Impact†† / Tacoma Stars	20	4	16	.200	120	215	12.0	3-7	1-9
6	Sacramento Surge	20	4	16	.200	131	238	12.0	3-7	1-9

^{†} Dropped out of league on December 23, 2014.
^{††} Dropped out of league on January 15, 2015. Tacoma replaces them in the schedule.

== 2015 Ron Newman Cup ==
=== Playoff format ===
Top three finishers in each division qualify for the playoffs. The winner of the playoff between the second and third place teams will play the first place team for the division title.

In the Eastern Conference, the playoff format will be the one used in the former MISL. Each round will be a home and home series. Teams that win both games will advance. If the wins are split between the two teams, a fifteen-minute mini game will be played immediately after the second game to break the tie. In the Western Conference, the playoff format will be single elimination, which was used in the former PASL. The Ron Newman Cup final will use the home and home (MISL) format, including a mini game to break the tie.

=== Eastern Conference Playoffs ===
==== Eastern Division Semi-Final ====
March 5, 2015
7:05 PM EST
Game 1

Rochester Lancers	20 - 7	Syracuse Silver Knights
	Report

Blue Cross Arena
Attendance: 5,129
Referee: Ryan Cigich
March 8, 2015
4:00 PM EDT
Game 2

Syracuse Silver Knights	17 - 6	Rochester Lancers
	Report

Oncenter War Memorial Arena
Attendance: 4,355
Referee: Brian Apwisch
March 8, 2015
6:00 PM EDT
Mini-Game

Syracuse Silver Knights	2 - 3	Rochester Lancers
	Report

Oncenter War Memorial Arena
Attendance: 4,355
Referee: Brian Apwisch

Rochester wins series 2 games to 1.

==== Eastern Division Final ====
March 11, 2015

Baltimore Blast	6 - 4	Rochester Lancers
	Report

Royal Farms Arena
Attendance: 5,544
Referee: Joe Della Penna

==== Central Division Semi-Final ====
February 26, 2015
7:00 PM CST
Game 1

Chicago Mustangs	6 - 3	Milwaukee Wave
	Report

Sears Centre
Attendance: 1,443
Referee: Brian Miller
March 7, 2015
3:05 PM CST
Game 2

Milwaukee Wave	9 - 2	Chicago Mustangs
	Report

UW–Milwaukee Panther Arena
Attendance: 2,888
Referee: Ryan Cigich
March 7, 2015
5:05 PM CST
Mini-Game

Milwaukee Wave	2 - 1 (OT)	Chicago Mustangs
	Report

UW–Milwaukee Panther Arena
Attendance: 2,888
Referee: Ryan Cigich

Milwaukee wins series 2 games to 1.

==== Central Division Final ====
March 12, 2015
7:00 CDT

Missouri Comets	8 - 2	Milwaukee Wave
	Report

Independence Events Center
Attendance: 3,441
Referee: Ron Cory

==== Eastern Conference Championship ====
March 13, 2015
7:35 PM EDT
Game 1

Baltimore Blast	6 - 4	Missouri Comets
	Report

Royal Farms Arena
Attendance: 4,562
Referee: Joe Della Penna
March 15, 2015
3:05 PM CDT
Game 2

Missouri Comets	7 - 10	Baltimore Blast
	Report

Independence Events Center
Attendance: 3,862
Referee: Ryan Cigich

Baltimore wins series 2 games to 0.

=== Western Conference Playoffs ===
==== Southern Division Semi-Final ====
March 1, 2015
2:00 PM CST

Dallas Sidekicks	6 - 5	Oxford City FC of Texas
	Report

Allen Event Center
Attendance: 3,421
Referee: Rich Grady

==== Southern Division Final ====
March 8, 2015
5:00 PM CDT

Monterrey Flash	11 - 1	Dallas Sidekicks
	Report

Monterrey Arena
Attendance: 6,113
Referee: Ermanno Rossi

==== Pacific Division Semi-Final ====
March 1, 2015
3:00 PM PST

Ontario Fury	5 - 6	Las Vegas Legends
	Report

Citizens Business Bank Arena
Attendance: 4,072
Referee: Kia Depaneh

==== Pacific Division Final ====
March 7, 2015
7:35 PM PST

San Diego Sockers	6 - 7 (OT)	Las Vegas Legends
	Report

Valley View Casino Center
Attendance: 4,279
Referee: Kelly Mock

==== Western Conference Championship ====
March 13, 2015
7:05 PM PDT
Game 1

Las Vegas Legends	6 - 7	Monterrey Flash
	Report

Las Vegas Sports Park
Attendance: 855
Referee: Kyle Trimble
March 15, 2015
5:05 PM CDT
Game 2

Monterrey Flash	7 - 4	Las Vegas Legends
	Report

Monterrey Arena
Attendance: 7,028
Referee: Ermanno Rossi

Monterrey wins series 2 games to 0.

=== Newman Cup Championship ===
March 20, 2015
7:35 PM EDT
Game 1

Baltimore Blast	4 - 6 (OT)	Monterrey Flash
	Report

Royal Farms Arena
Attendance: 6,712
Referee: Shane Butler
March 22, 2015
6:05 PM CDT
Game 2

Monterrey Flash	4 - 6	Baltimore Blast
	Report

Monterrey Arena
Attendance: 8,783
Referee: Kelly Mock
March 22, 2015
8:45 PM CDT
Mini-Game

Monterrey Flash	4 - 3 (OT)	Baltimore Blast
	Report; Report

Monterrey Arena
Attendance: 8,783
Referee: Kelly Mock

Monterrey wins Newman Cup 2 games to 1.

== Statistics ==
=== Top scorers ===
Rank	Scorer	Club	Games	Goals	Assists	Points
1	(Liberia) Leo Gibson	Missouri Comets	20	48	45*	93*
2	(United States) Gordy Gurson	Seattle Impact; St. Louis Ambush	23	46	18	64
3	(United States) Kraig Chiles	San Diego Sockers	19	45	17	62
4	(Canada) Vahid Assadpour	Missouri Comets	20	36	25	61
5	(Brazil) Mauricio Salles	Rochester Lancers	20	41	16	57
6	(Brazil) Lucas Totti	Oxford City FC of Texas	19	35	20	55
7	(Brazil) Tiguinho Dias	Ontario Fury	16	31	22	53
8	(Brazil) Freddy Moojen	Dallas Sidekicks	18	39	13	52
9	(United States) Nick Perera	San Diego Sockers	18	27	22	49
10	(United States) Matt Clare	Wichita B-52s	17	35	13	48

* MASL Record
Last updated on March 1, 2015. Source: "Scoring Leaders". Major Arena Soccer League.

== Awards ==
=== Individual awards ===
Award	Name	Team
League MVP	Leo Gibson	Missouri Comets
Goalkeeper of the Year	William Vanzela	Baltimore Blast
Defender of the Year	Pat Healey	Baltimore Blast
Rookie of the Year	Gordy Gurson	Seattle Impact / St. Louis Ambush
Coach of the Year	Vlatko Andonovski	Missouri Comets
Aaron Susi Trophy (Playoff MVP)	Gustavo Rosales	Monterrey Flash

=== All-League First Team ===
Name	Position	Team
Kraig Chiles	F	San Diego Sockers
Leo Gibson	F	Missouri Comets
Vahid Assadpour	M	Missouri Comets
John Sosa	D	Missouri Comets
Brian Harris	D	Missouri Comets
Pat Healey	D	Baltimore Blast
William Vanzela	GK	Baltimore Blast

=== All-League Second Team ===
Name	Position	Team
Gordy Gurson	F	Seattle Impact / St. Louis Ambush
Mauricio Salles	F	Rochester Lancers
Tiguinho Dias	M	Ontario Fury
Alex Moseley	D	Wichita B-52s
Eduardo Velez	D	San Diego Sockers
Danny Waltman	GK	Missouri Comets

=== All-League Third Team ===
Name	Position	Team
Freddy Moojen	F	Dallas Sidekicks
Nick Perera	F	San Diego Sockers
Lucas Totti	F	Oxford City FC of Texas
Nelson Santana	D	Syracuse Silver Knights
Enrique Tovar	D	Turlock Express / Las Vegas Legends
Chris Toth	GK	San Diego Sockers

=== All-Rookie Team ===
Name	Position	Team
Gordy Gurson	F	Seattle Impact / St. Louis Ambush
Lucas Totti	F	Oxford City FC of Texas
Vini Dantas	M/F	Baltimore Blast
Ney Almeida	M	San Diego Sockers
Onua Obasi	D	Baltimore Blast
Alain Matingou	D	Missouri Comets
Diego Reynoso	GK	Monterrey Flash
