= 2021 Major Arena Soccer League season =

Thirteenth season of the Major Arena League

Major Arena Soccer League
- Season: 2021
- Champions: San Diego Sockers
- Matches: 55
- Goals: 604 (10.98 per match)
- Top goalscorer: Ian Bennett (19 goals)
- Biggest home win: Kansas City Comets 13-4 Dallas Sidekicks (February 12, 2021) (March 14, 2021)
- Biggest away win: Ontario Fury 6-14 St Louis Ambush (March 5, 2021)
- Total attendance: 25,338
- Average attendance: 461
- All statistics correct as of July 16, 2023.

The 2021 Major Arena Soccer League season is the thirteenth season for the league. While there are 17 teams in the league, only 11 opted to play for the season due to the COVID-19 pandemic. However, by mid-season, four more opted not to play, which only left the league with 7 teams playing.

== Standings ==
Advance to semifinals
Advance to quarterfinals
League champion

Pos	Team	Pld	W	L	GF	GA	GD	PCT
1	Florida Tropics SC	13	10	3	82	59	+23	.769
2	Ontario Fury	10	7	3	72	51	+21	.700
3	Kansas City Comets	12	7	5	92	67	+25	.583
4	St. Louis Ambush	15	8	7	75	89	−14	.533
5	San Diego Sockers	10	4	6	41	43	−2	.400
6	Tacoma Stars	11	4	7	53	62	−9	.364
7	Dallas Sidekicks	11	1	10	44	88	−44	.091

Source: MASL

Tie-breaking criteria
The ranking of teams was determined as follows:
1. Winning percentage in all matches;
2. Winning percentage in the matches played between the teams in question;
3. Goal difference in all matches;
4. Greatest number of wins;
5. Fewest number of losses.

== Playoffs ==
All seven teams participated in the playoffs. The regular-season champion received a bye to the semifinals and chose its opponent from among quarterfinal winners. The no. 2 seed chose its opponent for the quarterfinals. The no. 3 seed had second choice of quarterfinal opponents. Each round was a two-game home-and-home series, subject to arena availability, with a 15-minute mini-game following the second game, if necessary.

Quarterfinals
5	San Diego Sockers	6	6	-
6	Tacoma Stars	5	5	-
2	Ontario Fury	9	10	-
7	Dallas Sidekicks	7	7	-
3	Kansas City Comets	7	6	-
4	St. Louis Ambush	4	2	-

Semifinals
5	San Diego Sockers	5	4	-
1	Florida Tropics SC	4	3	-
2	Ontario Fury	8	6	2
3	Kansas City Comets	7	7	1

Final
5	San Diego Sockers	7	5	2
2	Ontario Fury	3	6	1
