= 2025–26 Major Arena Soccer League season =

Major Arena Soccer League
- Season: 2025–26
- Matches: 96 (regular season), 10 (quarterfinals, semifinals, and Ron Newman Cup)
- Average goals/game: 11.5
- Top goalscorer: Alex Sanchez (32 goals)
- Biggest home win: Milwaukee 17 - 2 Utica (March 20, 2026)
- Biggest away win: Empire 6 - Milwaukee 3 (March 15, 2026)
- Longest losing run: 11 - Utica City FC (January 18-February 16)
- Highest attendance: 7,861 (March 29, 2026 at Toyota Arena)
- Average attendance: 2,870

The 2025–26 Major Arena Soccer League season was the eighteenth season of the league and the eleventh season as the Major Arena Soccer League. The regular season started on November 28, 2025, and ended on March 29, 2026. Each team played 24 games for a total 96 games.

== Changes from 2024 to 2025 ==
The league dropped from 12 teams from the 2024–25 season to 8 teams. With only 8 teams in the league, the playoff structure adjusted to having the top 6 teams qualify for the Ron Newman Cup Playoffs, with the top 2 seeds receiving a first-round bye.

=== Teams ===
Stadiums and locations

2026 Teams
Team	Arena	Location	Capacity
Baltimore Blast	SECU Arena	Towson, Maryland	3,580
Empire Strykers	Toyota Arena	Ontario, California	9,736
Kansas City Comets	Cable Dahmer Arena	Independence, Missouri	5,800
Milwaukee Wave	UW-Milwaukee Panther Arena	Milwaukee, Wisconsin	9.500
San Diego Sockers	Frontwave Arena	Oceanside, California	5,500
St. Louis Ambush	Family Arena	St. Charles, Missouri	10,000
Tacoma Stars	accesso ShoWare Center	Kent, Washington	7,141
Utica City FC	Adirondack Bank Center	Utica, New York	3,999

Locations of teams for the 2025–26 MASL season
MASL Member Clubs

==== Returning ====
8 of the 12 teams that competed in the previous season returned for the 2025–26 season

- Baltimore Blast
- Empire Strykers
- Kansas City Comets
- Milwaukee Wave
- San Diego Sockers
- St. Louis Ambush
- Tacoma Stars
- Utica City FC

==== Dropped to MASL 2 ====
- The Harrisburg Heat relocated to Hershey Park Arena in Hershey, Pennsylvania for the 2025–26 season. The Heat have temporarily moved to M2 due to the arena dates only working with the M2 schedule. The Heat will return to MASL for the 2026–2027 season.

==== Folded ====
- The Dallas Sidekicks, Texas Outlaws, and Chihuahua Savage were removed from the league's list of teams on its website prior to the start of the season. Both Dallas and Texas had arena complications, while the Texas Outlaws violated a league rule becoming bankrupt, and Chihuahua decided to drop out of the league.

=== Change in season format ===
For the first time in league history, each team will have the opportunity to play every opponent.

== Regular season ==
Playoff team
League champion

Pos	Team	Pld	W	OTW	OTL	L	GF	GA	GD	Pts
1	San Diego Sockers (C, M)	24	10	6	2	6	149	121	+28	44
2	Baltimore Blast	24	12	2	3	7	164	141	+23	43
3	Milwaukee Wave	24	11	4	2	7	180	144	+36	43
4	St. Louis Ambush	24	10	3	6	5	134	117	+17	42
5	Kansas City Comets	24	10	2	6	6	160	150	+10	40
6	Empire Strykers	24	8	4	1	11	121	115	+6	33
7	Tacoma Stars	24	7	2	1	14	118	174	−56	26
8	Utica City FC	24	3	2	4	15	124	188	−64	17

(C) Champion; (M) MASL Shield winner

Teams get 3 points for a regulation win, 2 points for an overime/shootout win, 1 point for an overtime/shootout loss.

Tiebreaker format: Points > Regulation Wins > Wins > Head to Head > Goal Differential > Goals For > Goals Against

== 2026 Ron Newman Cup ==
The 2026 Ron Newman Cup saw a reduction in teams from 8 to 6. Additionally, each round is played as a best-of-three series; in previous seasons, only the finals were played as a series and each preceding round was a single game.

If a series is tied after two games, the teams play a "knockout game," a 15-minute single period following the end of game 2. In the finals, the teams play a full third game unless arena scheduling does not allow for one; a knockout game may be agreed upon by the teams in place of the full tiebreaker.

Quarterfinals
4	St. Louis Ambush	9	5	2
5	Kansas City Comets	4	6	0
6	Empire Strykers	6	5	0
3	Milwaukee Wave	3	7	2

Semifinals
1	San Diego Sockers	6	6*
4	St. Louis Ambush	5	5
2	Baltimore Blast	7	4	1
3	Milwaukee Wave	5	5	2

Finals
1	San Diego Sockers	5	2	10
3	Milwaukee Wave	4	7	3

* represent overtime periods
