= 2023–24 Major Arena Soccer League season =

Major Arena Soccer League
- Season: 2023–24
- Champions: Chihuahua Savage
- Matches: 312
- Goals: 1,974 (6.33 per match)
- Top goalscorer: 35/ Marco Fabian
- Biggest home win: 17/ Monterrey Flash
- Biggest away win: 11/ Monterrey Flash
- Longest winning run: 10/ Chihuahua Savage
- Longest losing run: To be updated
- Highest attendance: To be updated
- Lowest attendance: To be updated
- Average attendance: To be updated
- All statistics correct as of 11 January 2025.

The 2023–24 Major Arena Soccer League season was the sixteenth season of the league and the tenth season as the Major Arena Soccer League. The regular season started on November 24, 2023, and ended on March 31, 2024. Each team played a 24-game schedule.

== Changes from 2022–23 ==
=== Teams ===
==== Rebranding ====
- Mesquite Outlaws to Texas Outlaws

==== On hiatus ====
- Florida Tropics SC

== Standings ==
Playoff team
League champion

(Bold) Conference winner

=== Eastern Conference ===
Pos	Team	Pld	W	OTW	OTL	L	GF	GA	GD	Pts
1	Monterrey Flash (M)	24	21	3	0	0	209	104	+105	69
2	Utica City FC	24	15	1	1	7	191	157	+34	48
3	Kansas City Comets	24	13	1	4	6	158	132	+26	45
4	Milwaukee Wave	24	12	3	2	7	161	137	+24	44
5	Baltimore Blast	24	8	3	2	11	140	154	−14	32
6	St. Louis Ambush	24	3	1	6	14	125	174	−49	17
7	Harrisburg Heat	24	1	1	3	19	105	191	−86	8

Source: MASL
(M) MASL Shield winner

=== Western Conference ===
Pos	Team	Pld	W	OTW	OTL	L	GF	GA	GD	Pts
1	San Diego Sockers	24	16	2	0	6	171	127	+44	52
2	Chihuahua Savage (C)	24	15	1	1	7	162	103	+59	48
3	Tacoma Stars	24	12	4	2	6	164	143	+21	46
4	Texas Outlaws	24	10	1	1	12	159	161	−2	33
5	Dallas Sidekicks	24	4	2	0	18	114	205	−91	16
6	Empire Strykers	24	2	1	2	19	115	186	−71	10

Source: MASL
(C) Champion

== 2024 Ron Newman Cup ==
Conference semifinals
E4	Milwaukee Wave	7	5	2
E1	Monterrey Flash	8^{OT}	4	1
E3	Kansas City Comets	5^{OT}	7	–
E2	Utica City FC	4	5	–
W4	Texas Outlaws	6	3	0
W1	San Diego Sockers	4	8	4
W3	Tacoma Stars	6	4	0
W2	Chihuahua Savage	5	7	5

Semifinals
E4	Milwaukee Wave	4	7	–
E3	Kansas City Comets	5	8^{OT}	–
W1	San Diego Sockers	7	5^{OT}	1
W2	Chihuahua Savage	13	4	2

Finals
E3	Kansas City Comets	3	4	–
W2	Chihuahua Savage	4	5	–

Note: The third game of each series, if played, was a 15-minute mini-game played following the conclusion of the second game.

== Awards ==
- MASL MVP: Genaro Castillo
- Defensive Player of the Year: Robert Palmer
- Goalkeeper of the Year: Nicolau Neto
- Newcomer of the Year: Newcomer of the Year: Marco Fabián
- Coach of the Year: Luis Jaime Borrego
- MASL’s Elite 6:
  - Genaro Castillo
  - Zach Reget
  - Marco Fabián
  - Robert Palmer
  - Marcio Leite
  - Nicolau Neto
- MASL Second Team
  - Franck Tayou
  - Dominic Francis
  - Ignacio Flores
  - Uzi Tayou
  - Ismael Rojo
  - Diego Reynoso
