= Monterrey Flash =

- Founded: 2011; 15 years ago
- Ground: Arena Borregos; Monterrey, Nuevo León, Mexico
- Capacity: 3,500
- Owner: Gerardo Guerra
- Manager: Mariano Bollella
- League: Major Arena Soccer League
- 2022–23: 3rd, Western Division; Playoffs: Quarterfinals
Home colors	Away colors

The Monterrey Flash, is a Mexican professional indoor soccer team based in Monterrey, Nuevo León, Mexico. Founded in 2011 as part of the Liga Mexicana de Futbol Rapido Profesional (LMFRPro), the team made its debut in the Professional Arena Soccer League (PASL) with the 2013–14 season. The team plays its home games at the Arena Borregos

When it entered the PASL, the Monterrey Flash became Mexico's third team to be part of the US-based league, joining the Tijuana-based Toros Mexico and Saltillo Rancho Seco. With the Toros not part of the re-branded Major Arena Soccer League, both Mexico-based teams were in the new Southern Division along with four teams based in Texas for 2014–15.

== History ==
In 2011, Monterrey Flash placed 1st in the LMFRPro. On November 3, 2013, at the first match of the 2013–14 season, Monterrey Flash set the PASL attendance record for a match with an attendance of 9,626.

== Year-by-year ==
League champions	Runners-up	Division champions*	Playoff berth

Year	League	Reg. season	GF	GA	Finish	Playoffs	Avg. attendance
2013–14	PASL	13–3	140	76	3rd, Central	Divisional Final	5,857
2014–15	MASL	18–2	169	69	1st, Southern	Champions	2,844
2015–16	MASL	On Hiatus					
2016–17	MASL	On Hiatus					
2017–18	MASL	20-2	179	110	1st, Southwest	Final	3,006
2018–19	MASL	19-5	176	121	1st, Southwest	Final	2,388
2019–20	MASL	20-2	196	111	1st, Western	No playoffs	2,468
2021	MASL	On Hiatus					
2021–22	MASL	On Hiatus					
2022–23	MASL	13-11	124	147	3rd, Western	Quarterfinal	2,468
2023–24	MASL	24-0	209	104	1st, Eastern		1,037
2024–25	MASL						

== Roster ==
=== Active players ===
As of May 22, 2020. Note: Flags indicate national team as defined under FIFA eligibility rules; some limited exceptions apply. Players may hold more than one non-FIFA nationality.

No.	Pos.	Nation	Player
1	GK	MEX	Berna Valdovinos
2	DF	MEX	Carlos Pichardo
3	DF	MEX	Damian Garcia
5	DF	MEX	Hector Vallejo
7	FW	MEX	Adriano Nunes
8	MF	MEX	Miguel Vaca
9	FW	MEX	Hugo Puentes
11	FW	MEX	Omar Santillán
12	MF	MEX	Erick Rosas
15	MF	MEX	Oscar Luis Cortez
16	FW	MEX	Armando Terán

No.	Pos.	Nation	Player
17	FW	MEX	Brian Kirvit
19	MF	MEX	Erick Jhon Ponce
20	FW	MEX	Edgar González
23	DF	MEX	Victor Quiroz
24	DF	MEX	Brandon González
26	MF	MEX	Eduardo Garay
28	FW	MEX	Edgar Flores
30	GK	MEX	Diego Reynoso
33	GK	MEX	Oscar Briones
58	MF	MEX	Jorge Rios
77	FW	MEX	Brayan Aguilar
