= Orlando SeaWolves =

American indoor soccer franchise (2018–2020)

- Full name: Orlando SeaWolves
- Nickname: SeaWolves
- Founded: 2018
- Dissolved: 2020
- Ground: Silver Spurs Arena; Kissimmee, Florida
- Capacity: 8,000
- Head Coach: Tom Traxler
- League: Major Arena Soccer League
- 2019-20: 8th, Eastern Conference; Playoffs: DNQ
- Website: http://www.orlandoseawolves.com/

The Orlando SeaWolves were an American professional indoor soccer franchise based in the Greater Orlando area. Founded in June 2018, the team made its debut in the Major Arena Soccer League with the 2018–19 season. The team's name and logo were revealed at a press conference on April 28, 2018. On March 13, 2020, head coach and GM Tom Traxler announced on the team's YouTube channel that the team and MASL season was abruptly over due to the COVID-19 pandemic. The team folded shortly afterward.

== Year-by-year ==
Season	League	Record	Pct.	GF	GA	Finish	Playoffs	Avg. attendance
2018-19	MASL	9-15	.375	141	173	4th, South Central	DNQ	1,127
2019-20	MASL	1-19	.050	88	202	8th, Eastern Conference	DNQ	764

== Personnel ==
=== 2019–20 ===
==== Active players ====
As of 21 May 2020

Note: Flags indicate national team as defined under FIFA eligibility rules; some limited exceptions apply. Players may hold more than one non-FIFA nationality.

No.	Pos.	Nation	Player
1	GK	USA	Josue Mazon
1	GK	POL	Piotr Sliwa
2	DF	USA	Raphael Nascimento
3	MF	USA	JC Henson
4	MF	USA	Corey Adamson
5	DF	USA	Mike Semedo
6	MF	COL	Jaime Castrillón
8	DF	USA	Jeff Michaud (captain)
9	FW	VEN	Victor Rada
10	MF	USA	Armando Tello
13	MF	USA	Ryan Sandige

No.	Pos.	Nation	Player
14	FW	BRA	Rodolfo Lopes
16	MF	USA	Darren Bell
17	MF	BRA	Eduardo Cruz
19	MF	BRA	Gui Ribeiro
20	MF	ARG	Rodrigo Kaufmann
23	MF	USA	Kevin Naranjo
77	DF	USA	Alex Tozer
79	FW	BRA	Rapha Tobias
89	GK	USA	Fernando Cortes
99	MF	IRQ	Abdullah Alzubaidi

==== Inactive players ====
Note: Flags indicate national team as defined under FIFA eligibility rules; some limited exceptions apply. Players may hold more than one non-FIFA nationality.

No.	Pos.	Nation	Player
7	DF	BRA	Luiz Mota
9			Jose Herrera
11	FW	USA	Daniel Jackson
12	FW	BRA	Maycon Franca

No.	Pos.	Nation	Player
21	DF	MEX	Edwin Rojas
29	MF	ENG	Lewis Neal
77	FW	MEX	Osvaldo Rojas

=== Staff ===
- (United States) Tom Traxler - Head coach
- (Brazil) Maycon Franca – Assistant coach
- (United States) Christine Bickle – Equipment Manager
- (United States) Lloyd Knudson – Trainer

=== Notable former players ===
- (United States) Gordy Gurson
