= El Paso Coyotes =

- Founded: 2016
- Dissolved: 2019; 7 years ago
- Ground: El Paso County Coliseum
- Capacity: 5,250
- League: Major Arena Soccer League
- 2018–19: 4th, Southwest Division; Playoffs: DNQ

The El Paso Coyotes were an American professional indoor soccer franchise based in El Paso, Texas. Founded in June 2016, the team made its debut in the Major Arena Soccer League with the 2016–17 season. The team's final season was 2018-19.
