= Atletico Baja =

Mexican football club

- Full name: Atletico Baja
- Stadium: Unidad Deportiva Tijuana
- Capacity: 200
- President: Alejandro Arce
- Coach: Rene Ortiz
- League: MASL
- 2016–17: 2nd, Southwest Division; Playoffs: Division final
- Website: http://www.atleticobaja.mx

Atletico Baja are a Mexican professional indoor soccer franchise playing in the Southwestern Division of the Major Arena Soccer League, representing the Mexican city of Tijuana since 2015.

== History ==
The team was founded in 2015.

== Players ==
As of December 20, 2016.

=== Active players ===
Note: Flags indicate national team as defined under FIFA eligibility rules; some limited exceptions apply. Players may hold more than one non-FIFA nationality.

No.	Pos.	Nation	Player
2	MF	MEX	Christian Saray
3	DF	USA	Timothy Liermann
4	MF	MEX	Christian Gutierrez
6	DF	MEX	Ernesto Luna
7	MF	MEX	Roman Ramirez
8	MF	MEX	Daniel Villela
10	FW	MEX	Juan Carlos Castor
11	DF	MEX	Jose Rodriguez
12	MF	MEX	Manuel Cebreros

No.	Pos.	Nation	Player
14	DF	USA	Oscar Espinoza
15	MF	MEX	Martin Lara
16	DF	MEX	Manuel Rojo
18	FW	MEX	Uziel Roman Gonzalez
19	MF	MEX	Christian Felix
20	GK	MEX	Arturo Acosta
21	MF	MEX	Oswaldo Lara
22	MF	MEX	Abraham Uriarte
25	DF	MEX	Ivan Santoyo
30	FW	MEX	Carolina Jaramillo

=== Inactive players ===
Note: Flags indicate national team as defined under FIFA eligibility rules; some limited exceptions apply. Players may hold more than one non-FIFA nationality.

No.	Pos.	Nation	Player
5	DF	MEX	Fernando Hernandez
9	FW	USA	Jonathan Zurita
17	MF	DOM	Emmanuel Escobar

No.	Pos.	Nation	Player
23	MF	USA	Andrew Garcia
23	GK		Miguel Marin
