= RGV Barracudas FC =

- Full name: RGV Barracudas Football Club
- Nickname: Barracudas
- Short name: Barracudas
- Founded: 2004; 22 years ago
- Stadium: Payne Arena; Hidalgo, Texas
- Capacity: 6,800
- Owner: Jose O. Ruvalcaba
- General Manager: Oscar Antonio Ruvalcaba Jr
- League: Major Arena Soccer League 2
- 2018–19: 2nd, Southwest Division; Playoffs: Division Final
| Home colors | Away colors | Third colors |

RGV Barracudas FC is an American soccer club based in Hidalgo, Texas. Founded in 2004 as an amateur team, the men's indoor squad made its professional debut at the Barracudas Sports Complex as the Brownsville Barracudas in the Major Arena Soccer League during the 2014–15 season. The club signed Luis Ángel Landín the following year, and that season advanced to the Division Final vs. Las Vegas Legends after his golden goal against Atlético Baja at Tijuana.

After taking the 2016–17 MASL season off to regroup, the Barracudas returned for the 2017–18 season as the Rio Grande Valley Barracudas, playing the State Farm Arena in Hidalgo. The RGV Barracudas signed Vicente Matias Vuoso during the 2017–2018 season.

On February 25, 2021, M2 announced the return of the team to the league to play in the 2021–2022 season after a brief hiatus. The club's colors are blue and white; their home uniform, sponsored by Eletto Sport, is a royal blue shirt with a white collar and white shorts with blue socks.

== Personnel ==
=== 2018–19 roster ===
==== Active players ====
- As of March 26, 2019

Note: Flags indicate national team as defined under FIFA eligibility rules; some limited exceptions apply. Players may hold more than one non-FIFA nationality.

| No. | Pos. | Nation | Player |
|---|---|---|---|
| 1 | GK | | Martin Cruz |
| 2 | DF | | Oswaldo Medina Gonzalez |
| 3 | DF | MEX | Genoni Martinez |
| 5 | DF | MEX | Emmanuel Aguirre |
| 6 | DF | MEX | Gustavo Rosales |
| 7 | MF | MEX | Carlos Hernández |
| 8 | MF | | Erick Jhon Ponce |
| 10 | MF | MEX | Efrain Martinez |
| 12 | MF | CRC | Diego Zuñiga |
| 13 | FW | MEX | Yotsi Martinez |

| No. | Pos. | Nation | Player |
|---|---|---|---|
| 14 | FW | MEX | Luis Saúl Ramírez |
| 19 | FW | MEX | Oscar Ventura |
| 21 | GK | MEX | Diego Angel Arriaga |
| 22 | MF | USA | Moises Gonzalez |
| 23 | GK | MEX | Fidel Garcia |
| 24 | DF | MEX | Ismael Pineda |
| 27 | FW | MEX | Carlos Portales |
| 29 | DF | MEX | Mitchell Cardenas |
| 32 | MF | MEX | Rodrigo Tinoco |
| 88 | MF | MEX | Topiltzin Mendez |

==== Inactive players ====
Note: Flags indicate national team as defined under FIFA eligibility rules; some limited exceptions apply. Players may hold more than one non-FIFA nationality.

| No. | Pos. | Nation | Player |
|---|---|---|---|
| — | | | Edgar Martinez Grimaldo |
| — | DF | | David Eduardo Lizcano |
| — | | | Adhemir Martinez |
| — | | | Adriano Nunes |

| No. | Pos. | Nation | Player |
|---|---|---|---|
| — | | MEX | Daniel Vazquez |
| 9 | FW | MEX | Gary Schuster |
| 15 | FW | MEX | Luis Eduardo Maldonado |

=== Staff ===
- (Mexico) Genoni Martinez – Head coach
- Marco Antonio Coria – Assistant coach
- Tenoch Juarez – Assistant coach
- Alejandro Diaz – Trainer

== Year-by-year ==
| League champions | Runners-up | Division champions | Playoff berth |

| Year | League | Reg. season | GF | GA | Finish | Playoffs | Avg. attendance |
|---|---|---|---|---|---|---|---|
| 2014–15 | MASL | 2–13 | 69 | 138 | Southern | Did not qualify | 700 |
| 2015–16 | MASL | 8–12 | 134 | 145 | Southern | Division Final | 1,000 |
| 2016–17 | MASL | On Hiatus | | | | | |
| 2017–18 | MASL | 3–19 | 129 | 222 | Southern | Did not Qualify | 1,500 |
| 2018–21 | MASL | On Hiatus | | | | | |
| 2021–22 | M2 | TBA | TBA | TBA | TBA | TBA | TBA |
