= Youngstown Nighthawks =

- Founded: 2014
- Ground: Covelli Centre
- Capacity: 5,717
- Owners: Edward Holmes
- General Manager: Chris Harrold
- League: Major Arena Soccer League 3
- Website: http://www.youngstownnighthawks.com/
Home colors	Away colors	Third colors

The Youngstown Nighthawks are an American Semi professional indoor soccer franchise based in Youngstown, Ohio. Founded in November 2014, the team debuted in the 2015–16 season.

The Nighthawks are owned by Edward Holmes, and Chris Harrold serves as general manager. The head coach is Ohio-native Allen Eller. The team plans to play its home games at the Covelli Centre. The team was rebuffed by the MASL, and since then, the team has been holding open tryouts to build its roster, participated in tournaments to hone skills, and organized community events for goodwill and publicity. They compete in the Premier Arena Soccer League. The Nighthawks began playing a series of exhibition games in June 2015.
