= Kansas City Comets (2010) =

Indoor soccer team based in Independence, Missouri

- Founded: 2010
- Stadium: Cable Dahmer Arena
- Capacity: 5,800
- Owners: Game Theory Ventures LLC
- Managing partner: Brian Budzinski
- Head Coach: Stefan Stokic
- League: Major Arena Soccer League
- 2025–26: 5th, MASL; Playoffs: Quarterfinal Round
- Website: http://www.kccomets.com/
Home colors

The Kansas City Comets are an American professional indoor soccer team based in the Kansas City metropolitan area that competes in the Major Arena Soccer League (MASL). Originally called the Missouri Comets, the team joined the Major Indoor Soccer League as an expansion team in the 2010–2011 season. The team plays its home games at Cable Dahmer Arena.

== History ==
The team is named after the original Kansas City Comets, who played in the original Major Indoor Soccer League from 1981–1991. Kim Røntved, a former Kansas City Comets star, was named the head coach on August 16, 2010. Assistant Coach Vlatko Andonovski was promoted to Head Coach on August 29, 2013, succeeding Røntved.

=== Early years (2010–2013) ===
The first couple of seasons saw the Missouri Comets establish themselves in the MISL. They finished third with an 8–12 record in 2010–11, falling to the Milwaukee Wave in three games in the playoffs. In 2011–12 the Comets finished second in the Central Division with a 15–9 record but were eliminated in the first round of the playoffs again by the Milwaukee Wave. The Comets finished 2012–13 in third place with a 13–13 record but made it all the way to the championship series, where the Baltimore Blast swept the series in two games.

In his first season as head coach, Vlatko Andonovski brought the Comets their first championship, defeating the Baltimore Blast in a three-game series in the final season of the MISL. In all four seasons as members of the MISL the Comets reached the playoffs, and won the championship on their fourth playoff appearance. This would be the final MISL championship.

=== Move to MASL (2014–present) ===
After the 2013–2014 season, the team announced that it was leaving the MISL along with five other teams and join the MASL. In the debut season of the MASL in 2014–15 the Comets went undefeated with a 20–0 record, ending the regular season with a league-best 239 goals and a +149 goal differential, but were swept by the Baltimore Blast in the second round of the playoffs. The Comets won the following season's Central Division with a 17–3 record before falling once again to the Baltimore Blast in the postseason.

Before the 2016–17 season, the team announced that they would be rebranded as the Kansas City Comets. As Goran Karodjov took the reins as head coach, the Comets still managed to finish second in the Central with a 15–5 record before the Milwaukee Wave swept the first series in the playoffs. Following the 2016–17 season, the organization's future was in limbo.

With player turnover and the return of Kim Røntved as head coach, the Comets ended the 2017–18 season with a 7–12 record and missed the playoffs for the first time in franchise history. Røntved and the Comets returned in 2018–19 with greater improvements and the return of several veterans alongside former owner Brian Budzinski. In 2018–19 they returned to the playoffs with a 13–11 record in the South Central Division before being swept by the Milwaukee Wave in two games in the first round of the playoffs. Kansas City faced some inconsistent results throughout 2019–20 and were eliminated from playoff contention before the season was abandoned due to COVID-19, ending the season with a 10–11 record.

The Comets organization persevered throughout the COVID-19 pandemic to help host the first-ever MASL all-star game in December 2020. After the all-star game, the Comets claimed the first inaugural Central Cup championship with wins over the Dallas Sidekicks, St. Louis Ambush and Wichita Wings.

In 2022–23, the Comets hired Kansas City native Jenna Winebrenner as an assistant coach, making her the first female coach in MASL history.

In Stefan Stokic's first season as head coach, the Comets made it to the Ron Newman Cup Finals and lost to the Chihuahua Savage. In that same season, Leo Gibson retired after tying Kevin Koetters for most goals in the history of Kansas City indoor soccer.

== Year-by-year ==
Year	League	Reg. season	Playoffs	Attendance average
2010–11	MISL	3rd MISL, 8–12	Lost Semifinal	4,017
2011–12	MISL	2nd Central Division, 15–9	Lost Division Final	4,092
2012–13	MISL	3rd MISL, 13–13	Lost in Finals	4,237
2013–14	MISL	3rd MISL, 14–6	Won Championship	4,180
2014–15	MASL	1st Central Division, 20–0	Lost in Conference Finals	4,452
2015–16	MASL	1st Central Division, 17–3	Lost in Conference Finals	3,892
2016–17	MASL	1st Central Division, 15–5	Lost in Division Final	3,720
2017–18	MASL	3rd Central Division, 7–15	DNQ	3,644
2018–19	MASL	2nd Central Division, 13–11	Lost in Division Final	1,988
2019–20	MASL	6th Eastern Conference, 10–11	DNQ	2,871
2020–21	MASL	3rd MASL, 7–5	Lost in Semifinals	not recorded due to COVID-19
2021–22	MASL	1st Central Division, 13–9	Lost in Semifinals	2,533
2022-23	MASL	5th Eastern Conference, 11-13	Lost in Play-In Round	4,355
2023-24	MASL	3rd Eastern Conference, 14-10	Lost in MASL Finals	4,829
2024-25	MASL	4th MASL, 15-9	Lost in Quarterfinals	4,194
2025-26	MASL	5th MASL, 12-12	Lost in Quarterfinals	4,363
Total		205–143; Win % = .589	22–28; Win % = .440	4,224

=== Honors ===
- MISL Champions: 2013–14
- Division Champions: 2014–15, 2015–16, 2016–17, 2021-22, 2023-24
- Central Cup Champions: 2020, 2021

=== Franchise leaders ===
Regular Season

- Appearances: Leo Gibson (213)
- Points: Leo Gibson (504)
- Goals: Leo Gibson (259)
- Assists: Leo Gibson (245)
- Wins: Danny Waltman (63)
- Saves: Danny Waltman (1,351)

Postseason

- Appearances: Vahid Assadpour (34)
- Points: Leo Gibson (40)
- Goals: Leo Gibson (27)
- Assists: John Sosa (17)
- Wins: Danny Waltman (5)
- Saves: Danny Waltman (172)

Total

- Appearances: Leo Gibson (243)
- Points: Leo Gibson (544)
- Goals: Leo Gibson (286)
- Assists: Leo Gibson (258)
- Wins: Danny Waltman (68)
- Saves: Danny Waltman (1,523)

== Head coaches ==
- (Denmark) Kim Røntved (2010–2013)
- (North Macedonia) Vlatko Andonovski (2013–2016)
- (North Macedonia) Goran Karaodjov (2016—2017)
- (Denmark) Kim Røntved (2017—2019)
- (Liberia) Leo Gibson (2019—2023)
- (Serbia) Stefan Stokic (2023—present)
