= Empire Strykers =

American professional indoor soccer team based in Ontario, California

- Founded: 2013; 13 years ago
- Stadium: Toyota Arena; Ontario, California
- Capacity: 9,736
- Managing Partner: Jeff Burum
- General Manager/ Head coach: Onua Obasi
- League: Major Arena Soccer League
- 2024–25: 7th, Playoffs: QF
- Website: theempirestrykers.com
Home colors	Away colors

The Empire Strykers are an American professional indoor soccer team based in Ontario, California, that competes in the Major Arena Soccer League (MASL). Founded in 2013 as the Ontario Fury, the team made its debut in the Professional Arena Soccer League at the start of the 2013–14 season. The team plays its home games at the Toyota Arena under the leadership of general manager, head coach, Onua Obasi. The team re-branded to its current name in 2022.

== History ==
In late May 2013, the owners of the now-dormant Anaheim Bolts announced that they would instead field a new PASL team at the Citizens Business Bank Arena in Ontario, California. The team held its first open tryouts on June 28–29.

On July 25, team president Bernie Lilavois announced that "Ontario Fury" was chosen from over 500 fan-submitted entries in a name-the-team contest. The name, logo, and team colors all reflect the passion of local soccer fans and the "powerful elements" of heat and wind that characterize the Inland Empire climate.

On September 17, 2022 the team was rebranded “Empire Strykers”.

=== Ontario Fury II ===
In 2017, the club started a developmental team known as Ontario Fury II that play in the new Major Arena Soccer League 2 (or M2, for short).

== Year-by-year ==
League champions	Runners-up	Division champions	Playoff berth

Year	League	Reg. season	GF	GA	Pct	Finish	Playoffs	Avg. attendance
2013–14	PASL	5–11	116	151	.313	6th, Pacific	Did not qualify	2,147
2014–15	MASL	13–7	169	145	.650	2nd, Pacific	Lost Division Semi-Final	2,503
2015–16	MASL	12–8	146	135	.600	4th, Pacific	Did not qualify	3,094
2016–17	MASL	12–8	148	132	.600	2nd, Pacific	Lost Division Finals	3,023
2017–18	MASL	10–12	155	142	.455	3rd, Pacific	Did not qualify	2,378
2018–19	MASL	11–13	147	117	.458	3rd, Pacific	Did not qualify	2,359
2019–20	MASL	12–9	137	115	.571	3rd, Western	No playoffs	2,106
2021	MASL	7–3	72	51	.700	2nd, MASL	Lost Championship	1*
2021-22	MASL	9-15	132	141	.375	3rd, West	Did not qualify	1,108
2022-23	MASL	10-9	138	132	.526	6th, Western	Did not qualify	2,560
2023-24	MASL	3-19	115	186	.136	6th, Western	Did not qualify	2,501
2024-25	MASL	11-10	165	145	.524	7th, MASL	Lost QF	3,217
2025-26	MASL	8-11	121	115	.421	6th, MASL	Lost QF	

* No fans due to the COVID-19 pandemic.

The Fury began exhibition play on October 26 with a 16–8 win over Toros Mexico. They defeated the Dallas Sidekicks 6–5 in their first regular season game on November 10. The team then suffered roster changes and struggled on the field.

== Playoffs ==
Season	Record	GF	GA	Avg. attendance
2014–15	0–1	5	6	4,072
2016–17	1–2	12	14	3,675
2021	5–3	45	43	1,000*
2024-25	0-1	2	4	N/A

* Fans only allowed in the Ron Newman Cup due to the COVID-19 pandemic, in which the Fury hosted both games and the mini-game.

== Personnel ==
=== Active players ===
As of December 7, 2025.

Note: Flags indicate national team as defined under FIFA eligibility rules; some limited exceptions apply. Players may hold more than one non-FIFA nationality.

No.	Pos.	Nation	Player
0	GK	USA	Brandon Gomez
1	GK	USA	Brian Orozco
3	FW	NGR	Qudus Lawal
5	FW	MAR	Mounir Alami
6	MF	BRA	Cyro Oliveira
7	MF	USA	Jorge DeLeon
8	MF	MEX	Leopoldo Hernandez
9	FW	USA	Anthony Powell
10	MF	USA	Justin Stinson
11	FW	CUB	Barbaro Shelier
14	MF	VEN	Dayerson Graterol
16	DF	USA	Ben Suddeth
18	FW	CUB	Walter Diaz

No.	Pos.	Nation	Player
20	MF	USA	Alan Perez
21	DF	USA	Andy Reyes
24	FW	KEN	Issak Somow
28	FW	USA	Abdul Mansaray
30	MF	UKR	Zakhar Shkidchenko
31	MF	USA	Steven Chavez
33	MF	MEX	Marco Fabian
44	DF	BRA	Filipe Dutra
47	MF	USA	Antonio De La Torre
51	DF	JAM	Robert Palmer
70	FW	USA	Lucas Ramalho
99	MF	KEN	Ali Somow

=== Staff ===
- (England) Onua Obasi – Head coach
- (Mexico) Jesus Molina – Assistant coach
