= Major Arena Soccer League =

- Founded: 2008; 18 years ago
- Country: United States (9 teams)
- Confederation: Pan-American Minifootball Federation
- Level on pyramid: 1
- Domestic cup: U.S. Open
- Current champions: San Diego Sockers (7th title)
- Most championships: San Diego Sockers (7 titles)
- Broadcasters: CBS Sports Golazo Network, MASL TV, Victory+, Fox Sports Mexico, Fox Sports 2, Fox Soccer Plus, National Soccer Network, Unbeaten Network
- Website: maslsoccer.com
- Current: 2026–27 Season

The Major Arena Soccer League (MASL) is a professional indoor soccer league in the United States. The MASL features teams playing coast-to-coast in the United States, and formerly Mexico and Canada. The league is the highest level of arena soccer in North America. The league draws talent from a global talent pool with players from Major League Soccer (MLS), Liga MX, and many national teams. With a new management team, the league has grown in popularity and commercially. Former USMNT and MLS star Landon Donovan played in the MASL, as do multiple international players.

== History ==
The league was organized as the "Professional Arena Soccer League" on May 18, 2008, as an offshoot of the Premier Arena Soccer League (PASL-Premier), the largest amateur league in the United States. The league was originally nicknamed "PASL-Pro" to distinguish it from PASL-Premier. The first league game was played on October 25, 2008, in front of a crowd of 3,239 at Stockton Arena, in Stockton, California, with the California Cougars defeating the Colorado Lightning 10–5. In 2011, it was announced the professional league would officially be referred to as simply PASL, while the amateur league would still be referred to as the PASL-Premier.

On March 17, 2014, one day after the 2013–2014 Major Indoor Soccer League Championship finale, United Soccer Leagues President Tim Holt announced "a number" of teams would not be returning to MISL the following year. In April 2014 it was officially announced that six teams (Baltimore Blast, Milwaukee Wave, Missouri Comets, Rochester Lancers, St. Louis Ambush, and Syracuse Silver Knights) joined PASL for the 2014–2015 season.

The league announced a change in its name from the Professional Arena Soccer League to the Major Arena Soccer League (MASL) on May 18, 2014. This represents a merging of the MISL and PASL names. MASL fielded 23 teams for the 2014–15 season.

=== Split and re-merger into the MASL ===
In February 2016, the current owner of the Baltimore Blast, Ed Hale, announced his intentions to leave the MASL and form a new league, the Indoor Professional League. Hale was later announced as the chairman of the league, and Sam Fantauzzo, former owner of the Rochester Lancers, was announced as the first commissioner of the league. The St. Louis Ambush, Baltimore Blast, and Harrisburg Heat announced plans to join, along with the expansion Florida Tropics SC. In July 2016, the MASL was reformed as a new not-for-profit entity [501(c)6], a new entity separate from the previous MASL, LLC.

In August 2016, the new MASL announced that the Blast, Heat, and Ambush would return to the MASL while the Tropics would join the MASL as an expansion team. This effectively ended the IPL split with the MASL.

In a repeat of the 2015-16 Newman Cup the Baltimore Blast would go on to once again defeat Soles de Sonora 2–1.

=== Launch of MASL 2 ===
In October 2017 it was officially announced the Major Arena Soccer League 2 (MASL 2) would launch in December 2017. MASL 2 serves as the developmental league for the MASL. The initial lineup of this league consisted of former MASL clubs Chicago Mustangs, Waza Flo, the reserve teams for the Ontario Fury, San Diego Sockers, former PASL clubs, and new expansion teams.

=== High-profile players ===
In the 2018–19 season, the MASL saw an influx of players to the arena game with past MLS experience, headlined by the additions of Landon Donovan to the San Diego Sockers, Jermaine Jones to the Ontario Fury, and Dwayne De Rosario with the Mississauga MetroStars. The Empire Strykers signed Marco Fabián to the second-largest contract in league history in December 2023 in an attempt to lure more professional players to the league.

=== End of the 2019–20 season ===
Like many sports leagues, the MASL ended its regular 2019–20 season early because of the COVID-19 pandemic. In May, the league announced that it was looking at conducting its playoffs in a centralized location. However, this did not take place, and the remainder of the season was cancelled.

=== Formation of the Major Arena Soccer League 3 ===
On July 20, 2020, the MASL launched a new semi-professional/amateur developmental league known as MASL 3 (Major Arena Soccer League 3) set to kick off in 2021. The anticipated conferences expected to play were to be in the North East, Mid-Atlantic, South East, Great Lakes, Central North, Central South, Heartland Conference, Mountain North, Mountain South, Southwest, Pacific North, and Pacific South regions. The Omaha Kings FC, Sunflower State FC, Grand Rapids Wanderers FC and Muskegon Risers SC were announced as the first members of the league. However, the Risers were dropped from M3 and replaced by the Springfield Demize and Wichita Wings 2. The league launched their new website on January 30, 2021.

=== Formation of the Major Arena Soccer League Women (2024) ===
On September 3, 2024, the MASL launched a new women's league known as MASL W (Major Arena Soccer League Women) set to kick off in 2024.

== Teams ==
=== Current Teams ===
Team	Location	Arena	Capacity	Joined	Coach	MASL2 Affiliate
Baltimore Blast	Towson, Maryland	TU Arena	3,580	2014	David Bascome	FC Baltimore 1729
Empire Strykers	Ontario, California	Toyota Arena	9,736	2013	Robert Palmer	N/A
Kansas City Comets	Independence, Missouri	Cable Dahmer Arena	5,800	2014	Stefan Stokic	Minnesota Blizzard
Lehigh Valley Spirits	Allentown, Pennsylvania	PPL Center	8,500	2026	Giuliano Oliviero	N/A
Milwaukee Wave	Milwaukee, Wisconsin	UW-Milwaukee Panther Arena	9,500	2014	Marcio Leite	N/A
San Diego Sockers	Oceanside, California	Frontwave Arena	7,500	2009	Paul Salvagio	N/A
St. Louis Ambush	St. Charles, Missouri	Family Arena	9,643	2014	Jeff Locker	N/A
Tacoma Stars	Kent, Washington	accesso ShoWare Center	7,141	2010	Nick Perera	N/A
Utica City FC	Utica, New York	NBT Bank Arena at the Utica Memorial Auditorium	3,860	2014	Nate Bourdeau	United Elite Krajisnik FC

=== Future Expansion ===
On September 23, 2025, the league announced the it is expanding to the Sacramento/Rancho Cordova region in 2027. A new arena is planned for Rancho Cordova as a part of the deal.

Future teams
Team	Location	Arena	Capacity	Joining
MASL Sacramento	Rancho Cordova, California	Dova Arena	7,500	2027

=== MASL Team Map ===
Active Clubs Future Club

== Champions ==
North American Finals champions
Season	Champions	Score	Runner-Up	Playoffs / Host
2008–09	Stockton Cougars	13–5	1790 Cincinnati	Stockton, California
2009–10	San Diego Sockers	9–8	La Raza de Guadalajara	San Diego, California
2010–11	San Diego Sockers	10–6	La Raza de Guadalajara	Cincinnati, Ohio

Ron Newman Cup champions
Season	Champions	Score(s)	Runner-Up	Playoffs / Host
2011–12	San Diego Sockers	10–7	Detroit Waza Flo	San Diego, California
2012–13	San Diego Sockers	8–6	Detroit Waza Flo	San Diego, California
2013–14	Chicago Mustangs	14–5	Hidalgo La Fiera	Hoffman Estates, Illinois
2014–15	Monterrey Flash	6–4 (OT), 4–6, 4–3 (OT)	Baltimore Blast	Monterrey, N.L., México (2-game series with mini-game tiebreaker)
2015–16	Baltimore Blast	7–4, 14–13 (OT)	Soles de Sonora	Hermosillo, Son., México (2-game series with mini-game tiebreaker)
2016–17	Baltimore Blast	2–4, 9–8 (OT), 1–0	Soles de Sonora	Hermosillo, Son., México (2-game series with mini-game tiebreaker)
2017–18	Baltimore Blast	4–3	Monterrey Flash	Monterrey, N.L., México
2018–19	Milwaukee Wave	5–2	Monterrey Flash	Milwaukee, Wisconsin
2019–20	Canceled due to the COVID-19 pandemic			
2021	San Diego Sockers	7–3, 5–6 (OT), 2–1	Ontario Fury	Ontario, California (2-game series with mini-game tiebreaker)
2021–22	San Diego Sockers	6–3, 4–3	Florida Tropics SC	San Diego, California (2-game series with mini-game tiebreaker)
2022–23	Chihuahua Savage	7–6, 10–6	Baltimore Blast	Chihuahua, Chihuahua, México
2023–24	Chihuahua Savage	4–3, 5–4	Kansas City Comets	Chihuahua, Chihuahua, México
2024–25	Chihuahua Savage	5–7, 10–6, 6–0	San Diego Sockers	Chihuahua, Chihuahua, México (2-game series with mini-game tiebreaker)
2025–26	San Diego Sockers	5-4, 2-7, 10-3	Milwaukee Wave	2 games in Oceanside, California & 1 game in Milwaukee, Wisconsin

== Attendance ==
Attendance by season for the Major Arena Soccer League
Season	Games	Total	Average	Playoffs	Games	Total	Average	Reference
2008–09	58*	76,888	1,326	2009				
2009–10	87†	58,801	676	2010				
2010–11	84‡	59,128	704	2011				
2011–12	96	63,003	656	2012	6	7,211	1,201	
2012–13	151	146,193	968	2013	11	19,006	1,727	
2013–14	159	214,552	1,349	2014	10	23,889	2,388	
2014–15	223	546,705	2,451	2015	19	88,513	4,658	
2015–16	198	480,019	2,424	2016	24	93,004	3,876	
2016–17	170	474,809	2,793	2017	19	61,196	3,221	
2017–18	176	446,913	2,539	2018	12	49,198	4,100	
2018–19	204	462,670	2,268	2019	12	41,756	3,480	
2019–20	179	454,670	2,540	2020	—N/a	—N/a	—N/a	
2021	17^{•}	19,519	1,148	2021	5^{•}	7,311	1,462	
2021–22	143^{¶}	264,448	1,849	2022	18^{¶}	24,218	1,345	
2022–23	168	364,822	2,172	2023	20^{#}	33,311	1,851	
2023–24	156	334,987	2,147	2024	16^{#}	15,282	955	
2024–25	144	325,048	2,257	2025	9	18,504	2,056	
2025–26	96	276,430	2,879	2026	14	40,637	3,335	
^{*} Does not include 28 games where attendance was not reported. The PASL 2008–09 regular season consisted of 86 games total.
^{†} Does not include 8 games where attendance was not reported. The PASL 2009–10 regular season consisted of 95 games total.
^{‡} Does not include 10 games where attendance was not reported. The PASL 2010–11 regular season consisted of 94 games total.
^{•} Due to COVID-19 only 17 out of 41 games this season where attendance was recorded. In the Ron Newman Cup Playoffs only 5 out 14 games recorded attendance.
^{¶} Does not include 2 regular season games where attendance was not reported; the MASL 2021–22 regular season consisted of 141 games total. Does not include 5 playoff games where attendance was not reported; the 2022 Ron Newman Cup Playoffs consisted of 18 games total.
^{#} Does not include 2 playoff matches in which attendance was not reported.

== Sponsorship ==
The official game ball was made by Puma SE through the 2016–17 season. Starting in the 2017–18 season, Mitre became the official ball sponsor of both the MASL and M2.

=== Broadcast rights ===
Select 2018–2019 MASL matches were broadcast on Eleven Sports Network in the United States. Some matches are also broadcast regionally throughout the United States. All matches since 2016–2017 season are archived on MASLtv, the MASL's YouTube Channel

For the 2022–23 Season, MASL announced broadcast partnerships with Amazon / Twitch, CanelaTV (Spanish) and AtmosphereTV.

At the start of the 2024–25 season MASL announced that they would partner with CBS Sports Golazo Network which premiered 40 games in their first full season.

== Staff ==
=== Commissioner ===
Keith Tozer

=== Office of the Commissioner ===
Shep Messing – Chairman
JP Dellacamera – President of Communications/Media
Lindsay Mogle – Director of Communications/Team Services
Jon Ramin – Vice-President of Operations
Werner Roth – Advisor
Dennis Fry – Chief Financial Officer
Ken Stanley – Content Director
Ryan Cigich - Head of MASL Officials
Jesse Meehan - Operations Manager
Pete Richmire – League Statistician
Óscar Sánchez – Spanish Content Manager
Phil Lavanco – Video Production Manager
Jack Williams – Social Media Manager
Christian Filimon - Director of Corporate Sponsorships

=== Executive committee ===
Jeff Burum (Empire) – President
Lane Smith (Tacoma) – Vice-President
Shelly Clark (St. Louis) – Secretary
Kevin Healey (Harrisburg) – Treasurer
Phil Salvagio (San Diego) – Member-at-Large

== Former/defunct teams ==
Former Major Arena Soccer League teams
Team	City/Area	Arena	Years Played
Atletico Baja	Tijuana, Baja California	Unidad Deportiva Tijuana	2015–17
Anaheim Bolts	Anaheim, California	Anaheim Convention Center	2011–13
Arizona Storm	Glendale, Arizona	Phoenix Sports Centre/Arizona Sports Complex	2011–13
Bay Area Rosal	Livermore, California	Cabernet Indoor Sports	2013–14
Calgary United FC	Calgary, Alberta	Stampede Corral/Calgary Soccer Centre	2008–11
California Cougars	Stockton, California	Stockton Arena	2008–11 (as Stockton Cougars 2008–09)
Cedar Rapids Rampage	Cedar Rapids, Iowa	U.S. Cellular Center	2015–18
Chicago Mustangs	Hoffman Estates, Illinois	Sears Centre	2012–17
Chihuahua Savage	Chihuahua, Mexico	Arena Corner Sport	2019;2022-24
Cincinnati Kings	Cincinnati, Ohio	Cincinnati Gardens/GameTime Training Center	2008–13 (as 1790 Cincinnati 2008–10)
Cincinnati Saints	Cincinnati, Ohio	Tri-County Soccerplex	2013–14
Cleveland Freeze	North Olmsted, Ohio	Soccer Sportsplex	2013–14
Colorado Lightning	Fort Collins, Colorado	Budweiser Events Center	2008–09
Dallas Sidekicks	Allen, Texas	Credit Union of Texas Event Center	2013–24
Denver Dynamite	Denver, Colorado	Denver Sports Center/Parker Fieldhouse/Denver Bladium	2008–10
Edmonton Drillers	Edmonton, Alberta	Servus Centre/Edmonton Soccer Centre South	2008–11
El Paso Coyotes	El Paso, Texas	El Paso County Coliseum	2016–19
Florida Tropics SC	Lakeland, Florida	RP Funding Center	2016–22
Hartford City FC	Hartford, Connecticut	XL Center	Never Played
Hidalgo La Fiera	Hidalgo, Texas	State Farm Arena	2012–14 (as Rio Grande Valley Flash 2012–13)
Illinois Piasa	Pontoon Beach, Illinois	Soccer For Fun Arena/The Sports Academy/The Field Sports Complex	2010–14
Kansas Magic	Overland Park, Kansas	EPIC Indoor Sports Center	2011–12
Kitsap Pumas	Bremerton, Washington	Olympic Soccer & Sports Center	2010–11
Laredo Honey Badgers	Laredo, Texas	Laredo Energy Arena	Never Played
Las Vegas Legends	Las Vegas, Nevada	Orleans Arena/Las Vegas Sports Park	2012–16
Louisville Lightning	Louisville, Kentucky	Mockingbird Valley Soccer Club	2009–12
Mississauga MetroStars	Mississauga, Ontario	Paramount Fine Foods Centre	2018-19
Monterrey Flash	Monterrey, Mexico	Arena Borregos	2013-19;2022-23
Ohio Vortex	Canton, Ohio	Cleveland Metroplex Events Center/Canton Memorial Civic Center/Gameday Sports Center/Pinnacle Sports Complex	2009–13
Omaha Vipers	Omaha, Nebraska	Omaha Civic Auditorium	Never Played
Orlando SeaWolves	Kissimmee, Florida	Silver Spurs Arena	2018–2020
Oxford City FC of Texas	Beaumont, Texas	Ford Arena	2012–15 (as Texas Strikers 2012–14)
Prince George Fury	Prince George, British Columbia	CN Centre	2009–10
Real Phoenix	Glendale, Arizona	Barney Family Sports Complex/Arizona Sports Complex	2012–13
RGV Barracudas FC	Hidalgo, Texas	State Farm Hidalgo Arena	2014–16, 2017–19
Rochester Lancers	Henrietta, New York	The Dome Center	2014–15, 2019–20
Rockford Rampage	Rockford, Illinois	Victory Sports Complex	2012–13
Sacramento Surge	Sacramento, California	Off the Wall Soccer Arena/Estadio Azteca Soccer Arena/McClellan Park	2012–16
St. Louis Illusion	Glen Carbon, Illinois	The Game Arena/Dellwood Indoor Soccer Arena	2008–10
Saltillo Rancho Seco	Saltillo, Coahuila	Autonomous University of Coahuila/Deportivo Rancho Seco	2013−16
Saskatoon Accelerators	Saskatoon, Saskatchewan	Credit Union Centre/Henk Ruys Soccer Centre	2008–10
Seattle Impact	Kent, Washington	ShoWare Center	2014–15
Soles de Sonora	Hermosillo, Sonora	El Centro de Usos Múltiples	2015–20
Springfield Demize	Springfield, Missouri	Lake Country Soccer	2010–11
Texas Outlaws	North Richland Hills, Texas	NYTEX Sports Centre/Arena Athletics/TCG Arena	2008–10
Toros Mexico	Tijuana, Baja California	Arena Furati/Parque UniSantos	2010–14 (as Revolución Tijuana 2010–12)
Tucson Extreme	Tucson, Arizona	Tucson Convention Center	Never Played
Tulsa Revolution	Tulsa, Oklahoma	Cox Business Center/Expo Square Pavilion	2013–15
Turlock Cal Express	Turlock, California	Turlock Soccer Center	2011–20 (as Turlock Express 2011–19)
Waza Flo	Flint, Michigan	Compuware Arena/Taylor Sportsplex/Melvindale Ice Arena/Dort Federal Credit Union Event Center	2008–16 (as Detroit Waza Flo 2008–15)
Wenatchee Fire	Wenatchee, Washington	Wenatchee Valley Sportsplex	2008–09, 2010–11
Wichita B-52s	Wichita, Kansas	Hartman Arena	2013–15
Winnipeg Alliance	Winnipeg, Manitoba	MTS Centre/Garden City Soccer Complex	2009–11
Youngstown Nighthawks	Youngstown, Ohio	Covelli Centre	Never played
