= Leo Gibson =

Liberian footballer (born 1983)

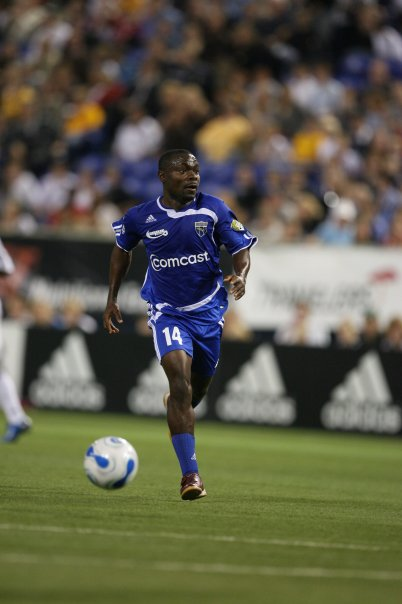

Personal information
- Full name: Leo Gibson
- Date of birth: August 9, 1983 (age 43)
- Place of birth: Monrovia, Liberia
- Height: 1.68 m (5 ft 6 in)
- Position: Forward

Youth career
- 2000–2002: Monrovia Black Star

College career
Years	Team	Apps	(Gls)
2002–2003	King Tornado		

Senior career*
Years	Team	Apps	(Gls)
2005–2008	Minnesota Thunder	48	(9)
2007–2009	Detroit Ignition (indoor)	19	(8)
2009	Cleveland City Stars	27	(10)
2009	Rockford Rampage (indoor)	3	(8)
2009–2010	Philadelphia Kixx (indoor)	9	(7)
2010	Charlotte Eagles	7	(3)
2010–2024	Kansas City Comets (indoor)	215	(264)

International career^{‡}
- United States futsal
- United States arena soccer

Managerial career
- 2017–2018: Kansas City Comets (asst.)
- 2019–2023: Kansas City Comets
- * Club domestic league appearances and goals as of 30 November 2021 ‡ National team caps and goals as of July 6, 2014

Leo Gibson (born August 9, 1983) is a Liberian footballer who played for and was the former head coach for the Kansas City Comets in the MASL.

== Career ==
=== College ===
Gibson was born in Monrovia, Liberia, but came to the United States in 2002, having previously played for the Monrovia Black Star youth team in the Liberian Premier League. He played college soccer at King College in Tennessee in 2002 and 2003.

=== Professional ===
Gibson had a trial with the Dallas Burn of Major League Soccer in 2004., before eventually signing with the Minnesota Thunder of the USL First Division in 2005. However, a hand injury kept him from playing any games that season. He remained with the Minnesota through the end of 2008, becoming an integral part of the team in the 2006 and 2007 seasons especially.

In 2007, the California Cougars of the Major Indoor Soccer League selected Gibson with the 40th pick in the MISL Draft. He informed the team that he preferred to not play in California and the Cougars traded his rights to the Detroit Ignition on November 15, 2007, in exchange for a first-round pick in the 2008 Supplemental Draft.

On March 17, 2009, having been released by Minnesota, Gibson signed for the Cleveland City Stars for an undisclosed transfer fee. He played 27 games and scored 2 goals for Cleveland before the club folded at the end of the season; after a brief return to indoor soccer with Philadelphia Kixx in 2009–10, he signed with USL Second Division side Charlotte Eagles in 2010.

Gibson was signed to play in the MISL's return to Kansas City with the Missouri Comets on October 16, 2010. Named the MISL's Offensive Player of the Month in November, it was Gibson's move to the Comets’ DEFENSIVE end on New Year's Eve that provided the club its much-needed spark in the back. Despite playing the first seven games on offense, Gibson still tied for the team lead in blocks with 20, which tied him for 6th overall in the league. Gibson was a tenacious defender, but he was often able to find the back of the net for the Comets, finishing 8th in the league in scoring with 45 points and finishing tied for the second most 3-point goals with four. As a reward for his efforts, Gibson was named 1st Team All-MISL.

Gibson was named head coach of the Comets on October 29, 2019.

Gibson retired from the Kansas City Comets in March 2024.

=== Honors ===
Kansas City Comets

- Major Indoor Soccer League Runners-Up: 2012-13
- Major Indoor Soccer League: 2013-14

Individual

- All-MISL First Team: 2010–11, 2012–13, 2013-14
- All-MISL Second Team: 2011-12
- Major Arena Soccer League MVP: 2014–15
- All-MASL First Team: 2014–15
- All-MASL Second Team: 2015–16, 2021
- All-MASL Third Team: 2017–18, 2018–19, 2019-20
- Ed Tepper Humanitarian of the Year: 2017-18
