= Ian Bennett (soccer) =

Canadian soccer player

Personal information
- Full name: Ian Dwight Bennett
- Date of birth: August 27, 1983 (age 43)
- Place of birth: Hamilton, Ontario, Canada
- Height: 1.70 m (5 ft 7 in)
- Position: Midfielder

Team information
- Current team: Milwaukee Wave
- Number: 26

College career
Years	Team	Apps	(Gls)
2003–2006	Marian Knights		

Senior career*
Years	Team	Apps	(Gls)
2001–2005	Hamilton Thunder		
2006	Palm Beach Pumas	13	(1)
2007	Charleston Battery	23	(1)
2007–2009	Chicago Storm (indoor)	28	(15)
2008	Richmond Kickers	14	(2)
2009–	Milwaukee Wave (indoor)	307	(492)
2021	→ Florida Tropics (loan; indoor)	15	(22)
2010	Rochester Rhinos	10	(0)
2016	Milwaukee Torrent		

International career^{‡}
2012–	Canada Futsal	15	(2)
2017–	Canada Beach	6	(3)
- * Club domestic league appearances and goals as of April 23, 2024 ‡ National team caps and goals as of May 4, 2021

Ian Dwight Bennett (born August 27, 1983) is a Canadian soccer player who plays for the Milwaukee Wave in the Major Arena Soccer League.

== Career ==
=== College and amateur ===
Bennett attended St. Thomas More Catholic Secondary School, and played college soccer at Marian College from 2003 to 2006.

During his college years Bennett also played with the Hamilton Thunder in the Canadian Professional Soccer League; he joined the Thunder in 2001 and remained with the team through the 2005 season. In 2006, he spent the summer with the Palm Beach Pumas of the USL Premier Development League.

=== Professional ===
Bennett turned professional in 2007 when he signed with the Charleston Battery in the USL First Division. In the fall of 2007, Bennett signed with the Chicago Storm of the Major Indoor Soccer League. In 2008, he moved to the Richmond Kickers of the USL Second Division. He returned to the Storm, in the Xtreme Soccer League for the 2008–2009 season and then when the Xtreme Soccer League folded, he joined the Milwaukee Wave in the MASL.

Bennett played with Rochester Rhinos in the 2010 season, then re-joined Milwaukee Wave starting in the 2010-11 MISL season, then transitioned with the Wave to the MASL, where he has won multiple personal honors and a Championship with the team.

With the Milwaukee Wave taking a hiatus for the 2020–21 MASL season, Bennett joined Florida Tropics SC on a season-long loan. The move reunited Bennett with former Wave teammates Drew Ruggles, Chad Vandegriffe, and Ricardinho Sobreira. Bennett was named MVP of the 2021 Major Arena Soccer League season.

== Honors ==
Rochester Rhinos

- USSF Division 2 Pro League Regular Season Champions (1): 2010

Milwaukee Wave

- Major Indoor Soccer League - Champions (2): 2010–11, 2011–12
- Major Arena Soccer League - Champions: 2018-19

Florida Tropics

- Major Arena Soccer League - Regular Season Champions: 2021

Individual

- MASL All Star: 2019-20
- MASL MVP (2): 2021, 2021–22
- All-MASL First Team (7): 2015–16, 2016–17, 2017–18, 2019–20, 2021, 2021–22, 2022–23
- All-MASL Second Team: 2018-19
