= Soles de Sonora =

Mexican professional indoor soccer franchise based in Hermosillo

- Nickname: Los Soles (The Suns)
- Founded: October 2014; 11 years ago
- Stadium: El Centro de Usos Múltiples; Bulevar Solidaridad 404; Colonia Álvaro Obregón; Hermosillo, Sonora C.P. 83170
- Capacity: 8,600
- Owner: Rogelio Enrique Cota Gutiérrez
- League: Major Arena Soccer League
- 2016–17: 1st, Southwest Division; Playoffs: Runner-up
- Website: http://www.solesdesonora.com

The Soles de Sonora (English: "Sonora Suns") are a Mexican professional indoor soccer and soccer franchise based in Hermosillo, capital city of the northwestern state of Sonora. Founded in October 2014, the team made its debut in the Major Arena Soccer League with the 2015–16 season. The team is also a member of the Liga Mexicana de Fútbol Rápido Profesional (LMFR-Pro).

The franchise is owned by a group led by Rogelio Enrique Cota Gutiérrez. The team plays its home games at the Centro de Usos Múltiples, an 8,600-seat arena in Hermosillo, Sonora.

== Personnel ==
As of May 22, 2020.

=== Active players ===
Note: Flags indicate national team as defined under FIFA eligibility rules; some limited exceptions apply. Players may hold more than one non-FIFA nationality.

No.	Pos.	Nation	Player
—			Martin Loya
5	DF	MEX	Adrian Miller
6	MF	MEX	Gustavo Rosales
7	MF		Bryan Macias
7	MF	MEX	Carlos Hernandez
9	FW	MEX	Enrique Canez
11	FW	MEX	Efrain Martinez
12	FW		Emanuel Celaya
13	FW	MEX	Alejandro Leyva
14	DF	MEX	Victor Baez
16	MF		Javier Francisco Acosta
17	MF	MEX	Daniel Lopez
23	DF		Javier Dorame

No.	Pos.	Nation	Player
25	DF		Esteban Gonzales
26	DF		Luis Erick Cuevas Baez
27	GK		Angel Rubalcava
28	FW		David Gonzalez
29	MF		Edson Sánchez
30	DF		Irving Murillo
55	FW	MEX	Erick Flores
70	DF		Ismael Rojo
89	MF		Manuel Aragon
92	DF		Jose Antonio Cruz Armenta
93	MF		Jesus Alberto Avendano
99	MF	MEX	Christian Espinoza

== Football team ==
Soles de Sonora
- Founded: 2 June 2025; 14 months ago
- Stadium: Estadio Miguel Castro Servín; Hermosillo, Sonora
- Capacity: 4,000
- Owner: Rogelio Enrique Cota Gutiérrez
- League: Liga TDP – Group 17
- 2025–26: Pre-season
- Website: http://www.solesdesonora.com
Home colours	Away colours

In 2025, Soles de Sonora absorbed the Búhos UNISON team that participated in the Tercera División de México, with this movement the club diversified its activities by establishing professional teams in both indoor and outdoor soccer.
