= 2013–14 San Diego Sockers season =

San Diego Sockers
2013–14 PASL season
- General Manager: John Kentera
- Head Coach: Phil Salvagio
- Arena: Valley View Casino Center; 3500 Sports Arena Boulevard; San Diego, California 92110
- Professional Arena Soccer League: 2nd, Pacific
- Ron Newman Cup: Division Final
- US Open Cup: Round of 16
- Highest home attendance: 5,658 (November 9 vs. Dallas Sidekicks)
- Lowest home attendance: 3,416 (December 21 vs. Turlock Express)
- Average home league attendance: 4,272 (8 games)

The 2013–14 San Diego Sockers season was the fifth season of the San Diego Sockers professional indoor soccer club. The San Diego Sockers, a Pacific Division team in the Professional Arena Soccer League and the 2012–13 league champion, played their home games in the Valley View Casino Center in San Diego, California. The team was led by general manager John Kentera and head coach Phil Salvagio with assistant coach Ray Taila. The Sockers finished the regular season 2nd in the Pacific Division with a 13–3 record, qualifying for the post-season but lost to the Las Vegas Legends in the Division Final.

== Season summary ==
The team struggled from the start of the season, dropping home games to the Dallas Sidekicks and the Monterrey Flash, snapping the San Diego franchise's long-running home winning streak. The Sockers then won 7 consecutive games, including 5 on the road, before surrendering an unprecedented 12 goals and falling to the Las Vegas Legends at home on January 11. The team won their last 6 regular season games to finish with a 13–3 record and qualified for postseason play. They defeated Tijuana-based Toros Mexico in the Pacific Division Semifinal but fell 7–11 to the Las Vegas Legends in the Division Final.

The San Diego Sockers participated in the 2013–14 United States Open Cup for Arena Soccer starting with a Round of 32 victory over the Ontario Fury on December 28, 2013, to advance to the Round of 16 where they lost to the Las Vegas Legends 9–12 on January 11.

== History ==
This is the third professional soccer franchise to use the "San Diego Sockers" name. The original Sockers were founded in 1978 and played in the North American Soccer League, original Major Indoor Soccer League, and the Continental Indoor Soccer League before ceasing operations in 1996. The second Sockers were briefly revived for the World Indoor Soccer League in 2001 and transitioned to the Major Indoor Soccer League II in 2002 before folding in 2004.

The current Sockers were founded in 2009 and played their first three seasons at the Chevrolet Del Mar Arena in Del Mar, California, before moving to Valley View Casino Center before the 2012–13 season. The VVCC, then known as the San Diego Sports Arena, hosted the indoor games of both of the previous Sockers franchises.

== Roster moves ==
Veteran player Aaron Susi announced in late February 2014 that he would retire from arena soccer after the end of the Sockers' season.

== Awards and honors ==
On December 17, 2013, the Professional Arena Soccer League named forward Kraig Chiles as the PASL Player of the Week. The league cited his resurgent scoring efforts, including five goals and two assists in the previous weekend's road games.

On January 7, 2014, the PASL named midfielder Brian Farber as the league's Player of the Week. The league cited his leadership and scoring efforts, including five goals and one assist, in his team's road win over Toros Mexico.

On January 28, 2014, the PASL named Kraig Chiles as its Player of the Week for the second time this season. The league cited his league-leading scoring efforts and four game-winning goals in bestowing the repeat honors.

On February 26, 2014, the PASL announced its "All-League" honors. Forward Kraig Chiles was named to the All-League First Team while defender Evan McNeley and goalkeeper Chris Toth were named to the All-League Honorable Mention list.

== Schedule ==
Win Loss

=== Regular season ===
Game	Day	Date	Kickoff	Opponent	Results		Location	Attendance
Game	Day	Date	Kickoff	Opponent	Score	Record	Location	Attendance
1	Saturday	November 9	7:05pm	Dallas Sidekicks	L 3–5	0–1	Valley View Casino Center	5,658
2	Saturday	November 16	7:05pm	Monterrey Flash	L 5–6 (SO)	0–2	Valley View Casino Center	3,922
3	Friday	November 22	7:05pm	at Turlock Express	W 6–3	1–2	Turlock Soccer Complex	730
4	Saturday	November 23	7:05pm	at Sacramento Surge	W 11–4	2–2	Estadio Azteca Soccer Arena	246
5	Thursday	December 12	7:05pm	at Ontario Fury	W 8–6	3–2	Citizens Business Bank Arena	1,210
6	Sunday	December 15	3:05pm	at Las Vegas Legends	W 7–5	4–2	Orleans Arena	1,106
7	Saturday	December 21	7:05pm	Turlock Express	W 9–6	5–2	Valley View Casino Center	3,416
8	Saturday	December 28	7:05pm	Ontario Fury†	W 13–5	6–2	Valley View Casino Center	3,683
9	Sunday	January 5	1:05pm	at Toros Mexico	W 12–7	7–2	UniSantos Park	388
10	Saturday	January 11	7:05pm	Las Vegas Legends†	L 9–12	7–3	Valley View Casino Center	4,734
11	Saturday	January 18	7:05pm	Bay Area Rosal	W 13–1	8–3	Valley View Casino Center	3,728
12	Sunday	January 19	4:05pm	at Ontario Fury	W 6–5	9–3	Citizens Business Bank Arena	1,860
13	Saturday	January 25	7:05pm	at Saltillo Rancho Seco	W 12–4	10–3	Deportivo Rancho-Seco Saltillo	200
14	Sunday	January 26	5:05pm	at Monterrey Flash	W 8–6	11–3	Arena Monterrey	4,891
15	Saturday	February 1	7:05pm	Toros Mexico	W 6–5	12–3	Valley View Casino Center	4,954
16	Sunday	February 9	3:05pm	Ontario Fury	W 10–3	13–3	Valley View Casino Center	4,092

† Game also counts for US Open Cup, as listed in chart below.

=== Post-season ===
Round	Day	Date	Kickoff	Opponent	Results		Location	Attendance
Round	Day	Date	Kickoff	Opponent	Score	Record	Location	Attendance
Pacific Division Semifinal	Saturday	February 22	7:05pm	Toros Mexico	W 7–4	1–0	Valley View Casino Center	4,116
Pacific Division Final	Saturday	March 1	7:05pm	at Las Vegas Legends	L 7–11	1–1	Las Vegas Sports Park	711

=== U.S. Open Cup for Arena Soccer ===
Game	Day	Date	Kickoff	Opponent	Results		Location	Attendance
Game	Day	Date	Kickoff	Opponent	Score	Record	Location	Attendance
Round of 32	Saturday	December 28	7:05pm	Ontario Fury	W 13–5	1–0	Valley View Casino Center	3,683
Round of 16	Saturday	January 11	7:05pm	Las Vegas Legends	L 9–12	1–1	Valley View Casino Center	4,734
