= 2014–15 San Diego Sockers season =

San Diego Sockers
2014–15 MASL season
- General Manager: John Kentera
- Head Coach: Phil Salvagio
- Arena: Valley View Casino Center; 3500 Sports Arena Boulevard; San Diego, California 92110
- Major Arena Soccer League: 1st, Pacific (regular season)
- Ron Newman Cup: Lost Division Final
- Top goalscorer: Kraig Chiles (45 goals, 17 assists)
- Highest home attendance: 7,311 (January 31 vs. Tacoma Stars)
- Lowest home attendance: 1,922 (November 20 vs. Las Vegas Legends)
- Average home league attendance: 3,814 (10 games)

The 2014–15 San Diego Sockers season was the sixth season of the San Diego Sockers professional indoor soccer club. The San Diego Sockers, a Pacific Division team in the Major Arena Soccer League, played their home games in the Valley View Casino Center in San Diego, California.

The team was led by general manager John Kentera and head coach Phil Salvagio with assistant coach Ray Taila. Amassing a 16–4 regular season record, the Sockers qualified for the playoffs as the top seed in the Pacific Division but lost to the Las Vegas Legends in the Pacific Division Final.

== Season summary ==
The Sockers started the season with a four-game winning streak before a road loss to the Las Vegas Legends. The team won the next two at home then lost back to back games in Missouri. Unlike in recent seasons, a substantial portion of the Sockers roster was born outside the United States. As of January 2015, the team included 7 international players, including 3 from Brazil, 2 from Spain, and 1 each from Mexico and Argentina. The Sockers then won their next 9 games, home and road, before losing on the road at Las Vegas for the second time this season. The Sockers closed out the season with a home win against the Ontario Fury, finishing with a 16–4 record and the top seed in the Pacific Division for the playoffs. They lost 6–7 to the Las Vegas Legends in the Pacific Division Final.

== History ==
This is the third professional soccer franchise to use the "San Diego Sockers" name. The original Sockers were founded in 1978 and played in the NASL, original MISL, and the CISL before ceasing operations in 1996. The second Sockers were briefly revived for the WISL in 2001 and transitioned to the second MISL in 2002 before folding in 2004.

The current Sockers were founded in 2009 and played their first three PASL seasons at the Chevrolet Del Mar Arena in Del Mar, California, before moving to Valley View Casino Center before the 2012–13 season. After early struggles, the team dominated the PASL for several years with long winning streaks and consecutive championships. The Sockers finished the 2013–14 regular season 2nd in the Pacific Division with a 13–3 record, qualifying for the post-season but losing to the Las Vegas Legends in the Division Final.

== Off-field moves ==
In May 2014, the Professional Arena Soccer League added six teams from the failed third incarnation of the Major Indoor Soccer League and reorganized as the Major Arena Soccer League. With the league expansion and reorganization, the other Pacific teams for the 2014–15 are California-based Ontario Fury, Sacramento Surge, and Turlock Express plus the Las Vegas Legends and the expansion Seattle Impact. The Impact's assets were purchased mid-season and the team replaced on the schedule by the Tacoma Stars.

== Schedule ==
Win Loss

=== Pre-season ===
Game	Day	Date	Kickoff	Opponent	Results		Location	Attendance
Game	Day	Date	Kickoff	Opponent	Score	Record	Location	Attendance
1	Saturday	October 18	6:05pm	Toros Mexico	L 5–7	0–1	Valley View Casino Center	

=== Regular season ===
Game	Day	Date	Kickoff	Opponent	Results		Location	Attendance
Game	Day	Date	Kickoff	Opponent	Score	Record	Location	Attendance
1	Saturday	November 1	7:05pm	Las Vegas Legends	W 5–4 (OT)	1–0	Valley View Casino Center	3,816
2	Saturday	November 8	7:30pm	at Seattle Impact	W 14–4	2–0	ShoWare Center	1,348
3	Sunday	November 16	5:05pm	Ontario Fury	W 7–2	3–0	Valley View Casino Center	2,913
4	Thursday	November 20	7:35pm	Las Vegas Legends	W 7–2	4–0	Valley View Casino Center	1,922
5	Sunday	November 23	3:00pm	at Las Vegas Legends	L 7–9	4–1	Orleans Arena	1,377
6	Saturday	December 6	7:05pm	Turlock Express	W 5–4	5–1	Valley View Casino Center	2,570
7	Saturday	December 13	7:05pm	Seattle Impact	W 17–10	6–1	Valley View Casino Center	2,837
8	Saturday	December 27	7:05pm	at Missouri Comets	L 7–10	6–2	Independence Events Center	4,218
9	Sunday	December 28	6:35pm	at St. Louis Ambush	L 3–8	6–3	Family Arena	6,574
10	Saturday	January 3	7:05pm	Sacramento Surge	W 18–5	7–3	Valley View Casino Center	3,254
11	Saturday	January 10	7:05pm	Harrisburg Heat	W 11–4	8–3	Valley View Casino Center	4,177
12	Friday	January 16	7:30pm	at Tacoma Stars^{1}	W 8–3	9–3	ShoWare Center	885
13	Friday	January 23	7:35pm	at Turlock Express	W 10–3	10–3	Turlock Indoor Soccer	570
14	Saturday	January 24	7:05pm	at Sacramento Surge	W 13–6	11–3	McClellan Park	545
15	Sunday	January 25	3:05pm	at Sacramento Surge	W 10–5	12–3	McClellan Park	358
16	Saturday	January 31	7:05pm	Tacoma Stars^{1}	W 13–4	13–3	Valley View Casino Center	7,311
17	Saturday	February 7	7:05pm	Baltimore Blast	W 7–2	14–3	Valley View Casino Center	6,247
18	Thursday	February 12	7:05pm	at Ontario Fury^{2}	W 9–5	15–3	Citizens Business Bank Arena	4,253
19	Friday	February 13	7:35pm	at Las Vegas Legends	L 5–8	15–4	Orleans Arena	2,311
20	Saturday	February 21	7:05pm	Ontario Fury	W 3–1	16–4	Valley View Casino Center	4,094

^{1} Seattle Impact shut down mid-season; franchise purchased by Tacoma Stars
^{2} Originally scheduled for February 15; rescheduled to avoid an arena conflict.

=== Post-season ===
Game	Day	Date	Kickoff	Opponent	Results		Location	Attendance
Game	Day	Date	Kickoff	Opponent	Score	Record	Location	Attendance
Division Final	Saturday	March 7	7:05pm	Las Vegas Legends	L 6–7	0–1	Valley View Casino Center	4,279

== Awards and honors ==
San Diego forward Kraig Chiles was selected for the 2014-15 MASL All-League First Team. Defender Eduardo Velez was selected for the All-League Second Team. Goalkeeper Chris Toth and forward Nick Perera were selected for the All-League Third Team. San Diego midfielder Ney Almeida was named to the league's all-rookie team for 2014–15.

On March 13, the MASL announced the finalists for its major year-end awards. These nominees included San Diego forward Kraig Chiles for Most Valuable Player and Chris Toth for Goalkeeper of the Year.
