= 2011–12 Professional Arena Soccer League season =

Professional Arena Soccer League
- Season: 2011–12
- Champions: San Diego Sockers
- Matches: 96
- Goals: 1,496 (15.58 per match)
- Top goalscorer: Kraig Chiles (46)
- Biggest home win: TIJ 28-7 ANA (January 14); ANA 17-3 ARI (January 28)
- Biggest away win: DET 11-3 OHI (November 5)
- Highest scoring: TIJ 28-7 ANA (January 14)
- Longest winning run: 16 Games: San Diego Sockers (unbeaten season)
- Longest losing run: 15 Games: Arizona Storm (November 13 - February 11)
- Highest attendance: 2,621; ANA @ SDS (November 19)
- Lowest attendance: 100; ARI @ TIJ (February 10)
- Average attendance: 656

The 2011–12 Professional Arena Soccer League season was the fourth season for the American professional indoor soccer league, now using the nickname "PASL" instead of "PASL-Pro". The San Diego Sockers became the first team in league history to finish a season undefeated. The Sockers won their third straight PASL Championship and the first Ron Newman Cup trophy by defeating the Detroit Waza 10–7 at the Del Mar Arena, home of the Sockers.

== Standings ==
As of February 26, 2012
2011-12 League Championship
2011-12 Playoff Team
(Bold) Division Winner

Place	Team	GP	W	L	Pct	GF	GA	GB
Eastern Division
1	Detroit Waza	16	13	3	.813	139	102	—
2	Louisville Lightning	16	11	5	.688	141	113	2
3	Kansas Magic	16	8	8	.500	109	116	5
4	Illinois Piasa	16	6	10	.375	101	116	7
5	Cincinnati Kings	16	6	10	.375	112	110	7
6	Ohio Vortex	16	4	12	.250	100	145	9
Western Division
1	San Diego Sockers	16	16	0	1.000	165	78	—
2	Revolución Tijuana	16	10	6	.625	176	132	6
3	Turlock Express	16	10	6	.625	129	128	6
4	Anaheim Bolts	16	8	8	.500	148	158	8
5	Tacoma Stars	16	3	13	.188	117	150	13
6	Arizona Storm	16	1	15	.063	59	148	15

== Statistics ==
=== Top scorers ===
Rank	Scorer	Club	Games	Goals	Assists	Points
1	(United States) Kraig Chiles	San Diego Sockers	15	46	20	66
2	(Romania) Costea Decu	Detroit Waza	16	27	20	47
2	(Serbia) Miki Djerisilo	Detroit Waza	14	21	26	47
4	(United States) Brian Farber	San Diego Sockers	16	27	17	44
5	(Brazil) Adriano de Lima	Anaheim Bolts	13	25	17	42
6	(United States) Allen Eller	Cincinnati Kings	15	22	14	36
7	(Mexico) Jorge Quiroz	Turlock Express	11	14	21	35
7	(United States) Cesar Romero	Revolución Tijuana	7	33	2	35
9	(Bosnia and Herzegovina) Elvir Kafedžić	Illinois Piasa	14	26	7	33
9	(United States) Aaron Susi	San Diego Sockers	13	11	33	33

Last updated on February 26, 2012.

== 2012 Ron Newman Cup ==
Divisional Playoffs; March 2–3
E3	Kansas Magic	9
E2	Louisville Lightning	5
W3	Turlock Express	4
W2	Revolución Tijuana	5
E4	Illinois Piasa	6
E1	Detroit Waza	7

Semifinals; March 9
Kansas Magic	6
San Diego Sockers	9
Revolución Tijuana	7
Detroit Waza	9

Final; March 10
San Diego Sockers	10
Detroit Waza	7

Divisional Playoffs

March 2, 2012
7:35 PM EST

Kansas Magic	9 - 5	Louisville Lightning
	Report

Mockingbird Valley Sports Complex
Louisville, Kentucky
Attendance: 757
March 3, 2012
7:35 PM EST

Detroit Waza	7 - 6 (OT)	Illinois Piasa
	Report

Taylor Sportsplex
Taylor, Michigan
Attendance: 717
March 3, 2012
7:05 PM PST

Revolución Tijuana	5 - 4	Turlock Express
	Report

Planet Gol Furati
Tijuana, Mexico
Attendance: 300

Semi-Finals

March 9, 2012
5:20 PM PST

Detroit Waza	9 - 7	Revolución Tijuana
	Report

Chevrolet Del Mar Arena
San Diego, California
Attendance: 658
March 9, 2012
8:20 PM PST

San Diego Sockers	9 - 6	Kansas Magic
	Report

Chevrolet Del Mar Arena
San Diego, California
Attendance: 2,151

Championship

March 10, 2012
7:05 PM PST

San Diego Sockers	10 - 7	Detroit Waza
	Report

Chevrolet Del Mar Arena
San Diego, California
Attendance: 2,628

== Awards ==
=== Individual awards ===
Award	Name	Team
MVP	Kraig Chiles	San Diego Sockers
Coach of the Year	Phil Salvagio	San Diego Sockers
Playoffs MVP	Riley Swift	San Diego Sockers

=== All-League First Team ===
Name	Position	Team
Costea Decu	D	Detroit Waza
Adriano DeLima	D	Anaheim Bolts
Brian Farber	M	San Diego Sockers
Miki Djerisilo	M	Detroit Waza
Kraig Chiles	F	San Diego Sockers
Vito Lonigro	GK	Detroit Waza

=== All-League Second Team ===
Name	Position	Team
Jesse Horta	D	Turlock Express
Ze Roberto	D	San Diego Sockers
Jorge Quiroz	M	Turlock Express
Allen Eller	F	Cincinnati Kings
Cesar Romero	F	Revolución Tijuana
Riley Swift	GK	San Diego Sockers

== See also ==
- 2011–12 United States Open Cup for Arena Soccer
- 2012 FIFRA Club Championship
