= 2013–14 Las Vegas Legends season =

Las Vegas Legends
2013–14 PASL season
- Owner: Meir Cohen
- Head Coach: Meir Cohen
- Arena: Orleans Arena; Paradise, Nevada; Las Vegas Sports Park; Las Vegas, Nevada
- Professional Arena Soccer League: 1st, Pacific
- Ron Newman Cup: 3rd Place
- US Open Cup: Semi-final
- Highest home attendance: 1,836 (November 10 vs. Toros Mexico)
- Lowest home attendance: 324 (December 21 vs. Bay Area Rosal)
- Average home league attendance: 699 (8 games)

The 2013–14 Las Vegas Legends season was the second season of the Las Vegas Legends professional indoor soccer club. The Las Vegas Legends, a Pacific Division team in the Professional Arena Soccer League, split their home games between the Orleans Arena in Paradise, Nevada, and the Las Vegas Sports Park in Las Vegas, Nevada. The team was led by owner/head coach Meir Cohen with assistant coaches Patrick Lawrence and Peter Sharkey.

== Season summary ==
The Legends started strong with 6 consecutive wins before losing to the San Diego Sockers in one of only two regular season home games the Las Vegas team plays at Orleans Arena this season. They recovered from this stumble to win their next 3, including a road win over San Diego, to give them a 9–1 record and sole possession of first place in the Pacific Division. The team finished strong, dropping road games to Toros Mexico and the Dallas Sidekicks but sweeping their season series with the Turlock Express, Sacramento Surge, and Ontario Fury.

The Legends finished the regular season with a 13–3 record and 1st place in the PASL's Pacific Division. In the post-season, they defeated the San Diego Sockers 11–7 in the Pacific Division Final to advance to the PASL Final Four. The fell 4–5 to Hidalgo La Fiera in the Semi-final match. They defeated the Cleveland Freeze 7–6 in the consolation game to take third place overall in the league.

The Las Vegas Legends participated in the 2013–14 United States Open Cup for Arena Soccer, starting with a Round of 32 win over the Las Vegas Knights of the Premier Arena Soccer League. They will beat the San Diego Sockers 12–9 in the Round of 16 on January 11 to advance to a Quarter-finals match on February 16 against Bay Area Rosal. They defeated Bay Area 21–0 to move on to the Semi-finals. Hidalgo La Fiera defeated the Legends 5–4 in a game that doubled as the PASL Semi-final match.

== History ==
The Legends were successful in the 2012–13 season, compiling a 13–3 record in the regular season and clinching the Southwestern Division title. The team advanced to the postseason but ultimately fell to the San Diego Sockers 6–5 in overtime in the PASL National Championship Semi-Finals.

The Legends participated in the 2012–13 United States Open Cup for Arena Soccer. They defeated Real Phoenix in the wild-card round, the CSC Cavalry of the Premier Arena Soccer League in the Round of 16, and the Tacoma Stars in the Quarter-Finals before losing in the Semi-Finals to the San Diego Sockers.

== Roster moves ==
Alencar "Junior" Ventura was one of several players acquired by the Legends on or just before the February 1 trading deadline.

== Awards and honors ==
On November 5, 2013, the Professional Arena Soccer League named forward Enrique Tovar as the PASL Player of the Week. The league cited his league-leading scoring efforts, including hat tricks in the team's victories over both Bay Area Rosal and the Sacramento Surge.

On November 26, 2013, the PASL named forward Ivan Campos as the league's Player of the Week. The league cited his offensive production this season, including a game-winning goal against the Ontario Fury in overtime.

On February 26, 2014, the PASL announced its "All-League" honors. Forwards Alex Caceres and Enrique Tovar were named to the All-League First Team and forward Ivan Campos was named to the All-League Honorable Mention list.

== Schedule ==
Win Loss

=== Pre-season ===
Game	Day	Date	Kickoff	Opponent	Results		Location	Attendance
Game	Day	Date	Kickoff	Opponent	Score	Record	Location	Attendance
1	Friday	October 18	7:15pm	Sidekicks Mexico	W 5–4	1–0	Las Vegas Sports Park	
2	Saturday	October 19	6:05pm	Tigres Dorados MRCI	W 6–3	2–0	Las Vegas Sports Park	

=== Regular season ===
Game	Day	Date	Kickoff	Opponent	Results		Location	Attendance
Game	Day	Date	Kickoff	Opponent	Score	Record	Location	Attendance
1	Saturday	November 2	7:05pm	at Bay Area Rosal	W 12–7	1–0	Cabernet Indoor Sports	543
2	Sunday	November 3	3:05pm	at Sacramento Surge	W 14–6	2–0	Estadio Azteca Soccer Arena	311
3	Sunday	November 10	3:05pm	Toros Mexico	W 7–3	3–0	Orleans Arena	1,836
4	Saturday	November 16	7:05pm	Wichita B-52s	W 14–5	4–0	Las Vegas Sports Park	618
5	Sunday	November 24	4:05pm	at Ontario Fury	W 11–10 (OT)	5–0	Citizens Business Bank Arena	2,026
6	Saturday	December 7	7:05pm	Sacramento Surge	W 14–6	6–0	Las Vegas Sports Park	344
7	Sunday	December 15	3:05pm	San Diego Sockers	L 5–7	6–1	Orleans Arena	1,106
8	Saturday	December 21	7:05pm	Bay Area Rosal	W 13–3	7–1	Las Vegas Sports Park	324
9	Saturday	January 4	7:05pm	Turlock Express	W 8–5	8–1	Las Vegas Sports Park	408
10	Saturday	January 11	7:05pm	at San Diego Sockers†	W 12–9	9–1	Valley View Casino Center	4,734
11	Sunday	January 12	3:05pm	at Toros Mexico	L 7–10	9–2	UniSantos Park	343
12	Friday	January 17	7:05pm	at Turlock Express	W 10–5	10–2	Turlock Soccer Complex	580
13	Saturday	January 25	7:05pm	Sacramento Surge	W 20–1	11–2	Las Vegas Sports Park	448
14	Friday	January 31	5:35pm	at Dallas Sidekicks	L 6–8	11–3	Allen Event Center	3,780
15	Saturday	February 8	7:05pm	at Ontario Fury	W 10–8	12–3	Citizens Business Bank Arena	3,346
16	Saturday	February 15	7:05pm	Ontario Fury	W 17–8	13–3	Las Vegas Sports Park	512

† Game also counts for US Open Cup, as listed in chart below.

=== Post-season ===
Round	Day	Date	Kickoff	Opponent	Results		Location	Attendance
Round	Day	Date	Kickoff	Opponent	Score	Record	Location	Attendance
Pacific Division Final	Saturday	March 1	7:05pm	San Diego Sockers	W 11–7	1–0	Las Vegas Sports Park	711
PASL Semifinal	Saturday	March 15	5:00pm	Hidalgo La Fiera†	L 4–5	1–1	Sears Centre	1,607
Third Place	Sunday	March 16	2:30pm	at Cleveland Freeze	W 7–6	2–1	Sears Centre	1,763

† Game also counts for US Open Cup, as listed in chart below.

=== U.S. Open Cup for Arena Soccer ===
Game	Day	Date	Kickoff	Opponent	Results		Location	Attendance
Game	Day	Date	Kickoff	Opponent	Score	Record	Location	Attendance
Round of 32	Thursday	January 2	7:05pm	Las Vegas Knights	W 8–4	1–0	Las Vegas Sports Park	
Round of 16	Friday	January 11	7:00pm	at San Diego Sockers	W 12–9	2–0	Valley View Casino Center	4,734
Quarter finals	Sunday	February 16	4:35pm	Bay Area Rosal	W 21–0	3–0	Las Vegas Sports Park	155
Semi finals	Saturday	March 15	5:00pm	Hidalgo La Fiera	L 4–5	3–1	Sears Centre	1,607
