= 2011–12 San Diego Sockers season =

San Diego Sockers
2011-2012 season
- Head Coach: Phil Salvagio
- Arena: Chevrolet Del Mar Arena; Del Mar, California
- 2012 Ron Newman Cup: Champions
- Average home league attendance: 2,197

The 2011–12 San Diego Sockers season was the third season of the San Diego Sockers indoor soccer club as a franchise in the Professional Arena Soccer League. The Sockers, a Pacific Division team, played their home games in the Chevrolet Del Mar Arena in Del Mar, California. The team was perfect, winning every game played that season (28–0), including games in the Ron Newman Cup playoffs, & in the U.S. Open Cup & FIFRA Club Championship tournaments. The team was led to a 16–0 regular season (with 165 goals-for and just 78 goals-against) and a third consecutive league championship by head coach Phil Salvagio.

== PASL schedule ==
Win Tie Loss

=== Regular season ===
Game	Day	Date	Opponent	Results		Location	Attendance
Game	Day	Date	Opponent	Final score	Team record	Location	Attendance
1	Saturday	November 12	at Anaheim Bolts	W 10–6	1–0	Anaheim Convention Center	1,208
2	Saturday	November 19	Anaheim Bolts	W 7–6 (OT)	2–0	Chevrolet Del Mar Arena	2,621
3	Saturday	November 26	Revolución Tijuana	W 16–10	3–0	Chevrolet Del Mar Arena	1,864
4	Friday	December 9	at Revolución Tijuana	W 6–5 (OT)	4–0	Estadio Furati	456
5	Saturday	December 17	Tacoma Stars	W 8–3	5–0	Chevrolet Del Mar Arena	2,470
6	Saturday	January 7	Anaheim Bolts	W 13–6	6–0	Chevrolet Del Mar Arena	2,334
7	Sunday	January 8	at Arizona Storm	W 10–3	7–0	Phoenix Sports Centre	352
8	Saturday	January 14	at Tacoma Stars	W 13–6	8–0	Starfire Sports Complex	211
9	Sunday	January 15	at Tacoma	W 10–6	9–0	Starfire Sports Complex	159
10	Saturday	January 21	Turlock Express	W 10–8	10–0	Chevrolet Del Mar Arena	1,604
11	Sunday	January 22	at Arizona Storm	W 9–3	11–0	Phoenix Sports Centre	150
12	Friday	January 27	at Anaheim Bolts	W 10–5	12–0	Anaheim Convention Center	1,826
13	Saturday	January 28	Revolución Tijuana	W 13–2	13–0	Chevrolet Del Mar Arena	2,428
14	Saturday	February 11	Arizona Storm	W 13–1	14–0	Chevrolet Del Mar Arena	2,137
15	Friday	February 24	at Turlock Express	W 8–4	15–0	Turlock Soccer Complex	---
16	Saturday	February 25	Tacoma Stars	W 9–4	16–0	Chevrolet Del Mar Arena	2,123

=== 2012 Ron Newman Cup ===
Game	Day	Date	Opponent	Results		Location	Attendance
Game	Day	Date	Opponent	Final score	Team record	Location	Attendance
Semi-Final	Friday	March 9	Kansas Magic	W 9–6	1–0	Chevrolet Del Mar Arena	2,151
Championship	Saturday	March 10	Detroit Waza	W 10–7	2–0	Chevrolet Del Mar Arena	2,628

== Non-PASL schedule ==
Win Tie Loss

=== 2012 FIFRA Club Championship ===
Game	Day	Date	Opponent	Results		Location
Game	Day	Date	Opponent	Final score	Team record	Location
1	Thursday	February 2	Monterrey Flash	W 5–4	1–0	Monterrey, Mexico
2	Friday	February 3	Sherbrooke Vert et Or	W 15–0	2–0	Monterrey, Mexico
3	Saturday	February 4	La Bombonerita	W 8–3	3–0	Monterrey, Mexico
4	Sunday	February 5	Monterrey Flash	W 5–3	4–0	Monterrey, Mexico

=== 2011–12 United States Open Cup for Arena Soccer ===
Game	Date	Opponent	Results		Location
Game	Date	Opponent	Final score	Team record	Location
Wild-Card	December 27, 2011	Las Vegas Select (Independent)	W 9–4	1–0	Chevrolet Del Mar Arena
Round of 16	January 8, 2012	Arizona Storm (PASL)	W 10–3	2–0	Phoenix Sports Centre
Quarter-Finals	January 14, 2012	Tacoma Stars (PASL)	W 13–6	3–0	Starfire Sports Complex
Semi-Finals	February 17, 2012	Turlock Express (PASL)	W 10–8	4–0	Chevrolet Del Mar Arena
Championship	March 17, 2012	Cincinnati Kings (PASL)	W 13–6	5–0	Cincinnati Gardens

== Awards ==
=== Team ===
- 2012 Ron Newman Cup - PASL Champions
- 2012 FIFRA Club Championship
- 2011-12 United States Open Cup for Arena Soccer Champions
- 2011-12 Best Record - PASL
- PASL Western Division Champions

=== Individual ===
- PASL MVP: Kraig Chiles - Forward
- PASL Coach of the Year: Phil Salvagio
- Ron Newman Cup MVP: Riley Swift - Goalkeeper
- All-League First Team: Brian Farber - Midfielder; Kraig Chiles - Forward
- All-League Second Team: Zé Roberto - Defender; Riley Swift - Goalkeeper
