= 2012–13 Las Vegas Legends season =

Las Vegas Legends
2012–13 PASL season
- President/ General Manager: (United States) Meir Cohen
- Head Coach: (United States) Greg Howes
- Arena: Orleans Arena; Paradise, Nevada
- Professional Arena Soccer League: 1st, Southwestern
- Ron Newman Cup: Lost in semi-final
- US Open Cup: Semi-finals
- Highest home attendance: 2,427 (January 18) vs San Diego Sockers
- Lowest home attendance: 575 (December 29) vs Arizona Storm
- Average home league attendance: 1,165 (over 8 home games)

The 2012–13 Las Vegas Legends season was the first season of the Las Vegas Legends indoor soccer club. The Legends, a Southwestern Division team in the Professional Arena Soccer League, played the majority of their home games in the Orleans Arena in Paradise, Nevada. (Three "holiday season" games were relocated to an indoor soccer facility at the Las Vegas Sports Park.) The team was led by team president and general manager Meir Cohen, head coach Greg Howes, plus assistant coaches Peter Sharkey and Patrick Lawrence.

== Season summary ==
The Legends were successful in the regular season, compiling a 13–3 record and clinching the Southwestern Division title. They fared better on the road than at home, going undefeated at away games but only 5–3 at home. The team advanced to the postseason and earned the right to play for the Ron Newman Cup in the PASL National Championship. The Legends defeated Toros Mexico in two straight games, winning the Southwestern Divisional Finals and advancing to the semi-finals to face the San Diego Sockers in San Diego, California. The Legends lost to the Sockers 6–5 in overtime, ending their playoff run.

The Legends participated in the 2012–13 United States Open Cup for Arena Soccer. They defeated Real Phoenix in the Wild Card round, the CSC Cavalry of the Premier Arena Soccer League in the Round of 16, and the Tacoma Stars in the quarter-finals before losing in the semi-finals to the San Diego Sockers.

== Off-field moves ==
The Legends paid a $50,000 fee to the PASL to participate in the 2012-13 season. The team was initially to be called the Las Vegas Knights, after a local semi-pro soccer team under the same ownership, but a last-minute decision changed the team's name to Legends.

KHDF-CD ("Azteca 19") broadcasts select Las Vegas Legends games.

In early January 2013, the Legends announced that their pivotal January 18 match against the San Diego Sockers would be dedicated to the memory of Allison Wyatt, one of the children murdered in the Sandy Hook Elementary School shooting in December 2012. Wyatt was the oldest daughter of Ben Wyatt, the vice president of TransAct Technologies, a company with strong Las Vegas ties. The team is donating proceeds from ticket and merchandise sales, a silent auction, and other fundraisers to the Allison Wyatt Memorial Fund.

== Roster moves ==
The Legends signed their first player, veteran Enrique Tovar, in a ceremony at the Luxor Las Vegas on August 7, 2012. Multiple rounds of tryouts in late August 2012 were used to winnow a field of more than 100 applicants to round out the team's final roster. Players selected include local standouts Eric Guzman and Edgar Nava. Guzman, just 19 when the season began, is the youngest player on the Legends roster. Veteran Emmanuel Ayim has a doctorate in sports education leadership and is an academic adviser at the University of Nevada, Las Vegas.

Brazilian-born Ricardo Sobreira, better known as Ricardinho, emerged as the team's leading scorer. Ricardinho quickly became a fan favorite, drawing praise from his coach and attention from both fans and local media.

Corey Adamson, most recently of the Panama City Beach Pirates, has made appearances on the Legends roster.

Brian Fitzmaurice, a former standout soccerplayer at T. C. Roberson High School in Asheville, North Carolina, is now a defender for the Legends.

Forward Franck Tayou and defender Uzi Tayou are brothers, two of nine siblings who emigrated to the United States with their father after fleeing Cameroon to escape political persecution. The brothers have lived in Las Vegas since 2006.

== Awards and honors ==
On December 18, 2012, the Professional Arena Soccer League named Rodrigo Barbirato as its Player of the Week. The league cited his hat trick in Las Vegas' win over Real Phoenix on December 15 and his 14 points in the team's first 5 games this season.

On February 19, 2013, the PASL named Enrique "Qeeks" Tovar as its Player of the Week. The PASL cited his three goals and five assists against the Anaheim Bolts in the Legends's final regular season match plus his setting of a new league record for assists in a single season.

In postseason honors, defender Eric Guzman was named to the 2012-13 PASL All-League First Team and forward Enrique Tovar was named to the 2012-13 PASL All-League Second Team. Greg Howes was the runner-up for the 2012-13 PASL Coach of the Year honor.

== Schedule ==
Win Tie Loss

=== Pre-season ===
Game	Day	Date	Kickoff	Opponent	Results		Location	Attendance
Game	Day	Date	Kickoff	Opponent	Final Score	Record	Location	Attendance
1	Thursday	October 18	7:00pm	Stars of Mexico	W 8–7 (OT)	1–0	Orleans Arena	4,100+

=== Regular season ===
Game	Day	Date	Kickoff	Opponent	Results		Location	Attendance
Game	Day	Date	Kickoff	Opponent	Final Score	Record	Location	Attendance
1	Thursday	November 1	7:00pm	Arizona Storm	W 11–2	1–0	Orleans Arena	775
2	Sunday	November 4	2:00pm	Anaheim Bolts	L 8–11	1–1	Orleans Arena	1,145
3	Friday	November 9	8:00pm	at Turlock Express	W 10–6	2–1	Turlock Soccer Complex	534
4	Saturday	November 10	7:00pm	at Sacramento Surge	W 8–2	3–1	Off The Wall Soccer Arena	324
5	Sunday	November 18	4:00pm	at Toros Mexico	W 13–3	4–1	Unisantos Park	314
6	Sunday	December 9	2:00pm	Toros Mexico	W 16–9	5–1	Orleans Arena	1,246
7	Saturday	December 15	7:00pm	Real Phoenix†	W 10–4	6–1	Orleans Arena	765
8	Saturday	December 29	7:00pm	Arizona Storm	W 8–6	7–1	Las Vegas Sports Park	575
9	Friday	January 4	7:00pm	Tacoma Stars†	W 15–6	8–1	Las Vegas Sports Park	620
10	Saturday	January 12	7:00pm (6:00pm Pacific)	at Real Phoenix	W 6–1	9–1	Barney Family Sports Complex	203
11	Sunday	January 13	4:00pm (3:00pm Pacific)	at Arizona Storm	W 12–5	10–1	Arizona Sports Complex	125
12	Friday	January 18	7:00pm	San Diego Sockers†	L 5–6	10–2	Orleans Arena	2,427
13	Sunday	January 27	5:05pm (4:05pm Pacific)	at Arizona Storm	W 17–7	11–2	Arizona Sports Complex	222
14	Thursday	January 31	7:00pm	Dallas Sidekicks	L 2–4	11–3	Orleans Arena	1,119
15	Saturday	February 9	4:00pm (3:00pm Pacific)	at Real Phoenix	W 13–4	12–3	Arizona Sports Complex	69
16	Sunday	February 17	4:00pm	at Anaheim Bolts	W 20–5	13–3	Anaheim Convention Center	769

† Game also counts for US Open Cup, as listed in chart below.

=== Postseason ===
Round	Day	Date	Kickoff	Opponent	Results		Location	Attendance
Round	Day	Date	Kickoff	Opponent	Final Score	Record	Location	Attendance
Division Finals Game 1	Saturday	February 23	3:30pm	at Toros Mexico	W 10–8	1–0	Valley View Casino Center	412
Division Finals Game 2	Sunday	February 24	4:00pm	Toros Mexico	W 10–4	2–0	Orleans Arena	1,023
Semi-Finals	Sunday	March 10	6:30pm	at San Diego Sockers	L 5–6 (OT)	2–1	Valley View Casino Center	4,287

=== 2012–13 US Open Cup for Arena Soccer ===
Game	Date	Kickoff	Opponent	Results		Location	Attendance
Game	Date	Kickoff	Opponent	Final Score	Record	Location	Attendance
Wild Card	December 15	7:00pm	Real Phoenix	W 10–4	1–0	Orleans Arena	765
Round of 16	December 28	7:00pm	CSC Cavalry (PASL-Premier)	W 18–3	2–0	Las Vegas Sports Park	620
Quarter-final	January 4	7:00pm	Tacoma Stars	W 15–6	3–0	Las Vegas Sports Park	620
Semi-final	January 18	7:00pm	San Diego Sockers	L 5–6	3–1	Orleans Arena	2,427
