= 2013–14 Toros Mexico season =

Toros Mexico
2013–14 PASL season
- Owner: Joe Pollard
- Head Coach: Joe Pollard
- Arena: UniSantos Park; Tijuana, Mexico
- Highest home attendance: 363 (November 17 vs. Monterrey Flash)
- Lowest home attendance: 118 (February 15 vs. Bay Area Rosal)
- Average home league attendance: 262 (8 games)

The 2013–14 Toros Mexico season was the fifth season of the Toros Mexico professional indoor soccer club and second under the "Toros Mexico" name. The Toros, a Pacific Division team in the Professional Arena Soccer League, played their home games in the UniSantos Park in Tijuana, Mexico. The team was led by owner and head coach Joe Pollard with assistant coach Cristian Acosta.

== Season summary ==
Unlike the 17 US-based PASL teams, Toros Mexico and the other two Mexico-based teams did not participate in the 2013–14 United States Open Cup for Arena Soccer.

== History ==
The Toros played the 2009-10, 2010–11, and 2011–12 seasons at Furati Arena as "Revolución Tijuana". In September 2012, Ramon Quezada and Eduardo Vele sold the team to head coach Joe Pollard but retained the rights to the old name and logo.

The team had mixed results in the 2012–13 regular season, compiling a 7–9 record, but placed second in the PASL's Southwest Division. The team advanced to the postseason but lost two straight games to the Las Vegas Legends in the Divisional Finals, ending their playoff run.

== Schedule ==
Win Loss

=== Pre-season ===
Game	Day	Date	Kickoff	Opponent	Results		Location	Attendance
Game	Day	Date	Kickoff	Opponent	Score	Record	Location	Attendance
1	Saturday	October 26	7:05pm	at Ontario Fury	L 8–16	0–1	Citizens Business Bank Arena	5,285

=== Regular season ===
Game	Day	Date	Kickoff	Opponent	Results		Location	Attendance
Game	Day	Date	Kickoff	Opponent	Score	Record	Location	Attendance
1	Sunday	November 10	3:05pm	at Las Vegas Legends	L 3–7	0–1	Orleans Arena	1,836
2	Sunday	November 17	1:05pm	Monterrey Flash	L 6–10	0–2	UniSantos Park	363
3	Saturday	November 23	7:05pm	at Bay Area Rosal	W 10–7	1–2	Cabernet Indoor Sports	652
4	Sunday	December 1	1:05pm	Ontario Fury	W 18–4	2–2	UniSantos Park	207
5	Saturday	December 14	7:05pm	at Sacramento Surge	W 7–6 (OT)	3–2	Estadio Azteca Soccer Arena	215
6	Sunday	December 15	6:00pm	at Bay Area Rosal	L 8–9 (OT)	3–3	Cabernet Indoor Sports	480
7	Sunday	December 22	1:05pm	Turlock Express	W 16–8	4–3	UniSantos Park	218
8	Saturday	January 4	7:05pm	at Ontario Fury	L 5–12	4–4	Citizens Business Bank Arena	2,653
9	Sunday	January 5	1:05pm	San Diego Sockers	L 7–12	4–5	UniSantos Park	388
10	Sunday	January 12	1:05pm	Las Vegas Legends	W 10–7	5–5	UniSantos Park	343
11	Sunday	January 19	1:05pm	Bay Area Rosal	W 17–7	6–5	UniSantos Park	219
12	Sunday	January 26	1:05pm	Sacramento Surge	W 20–6	7–5	UniSantos Park	224
13	Saturday	February 1	7:05pm	at San Diego Sockers	L 5–6	7–6	Valley View Casino Center	4,954
14	Friday	February 7	7:05pm	at Turlock Express	L 6–9	7–7	Turlock Soccer Complex	673
15	Saturday	February 8	7:05pm	at Sacramento Surge	W 10–6	8–7	Estadio Azteca Soccer Arena	323
16	Saturday	February 15♥	5:05pm	Bay Area Rosal	W 27–2	9–7	UniSantos Park	118

♥ Rescheduled from February 16.

=== Post-season ===
Round	Day	Date	Kickoff	Opponent	Results		Location	Attendance
Round	Day	Date	Kickoff	Opponent	Score	Record	Location	Attendance
Pacific Division Semifinal	Saturday	February 22	7:05pm	at San Diego Sockers	L 4–7	0–1	Valley View Casino Center	4,116
