= 2012–13 San Diego Sockers season =

San Diego Sockers
2012–13 PASL season
- General Manager: John Kentera
- Head Coach: Phil Salvagio
- Arena: Valley View Casino Center; San Diego, California
- PASL: 1st, Pacific
- Ron Newman Cup: Champions
- US Open Cup: Lost in Final
- Highest home attendance: 4,703 (February 10, 2013) vs Arizona Storm
- Lowest home attendance: 2,586 (December 15, 2012) vs Tacoma Stars
- Average home league attendance: 3,744 (over 8 home games)

The 2012–13 San Diego Sockers season was the fourth season of the San Diego Sockers professional indoor soccer club as a franchise in the Professional Arena Soccer League. The Sockers, a Pacific Division team, played their home games in the Valley View Casino Center in San Diego, California. General manager John Kentera and head coach Phil Salvagio led the Sockers to the best regular season record in the PASL and their fourth consecutive league championship.

== Season summary ==
The Sockers were very successful in the regular season, finishing 15–1 and clinching the Western Division title for the fourth consecutive season. They began the season with a 37-game win streak, one of the best in professional sports history, and the last three PASL league championships. The team's win over Toros Mexico on November 23, 2012, gave the Sockers the new United States record for consecutive wins by a professional soccer team. The team remained undefeated at home but the streak was snapped after 48 games by a 6–5 overtime road loss to longtime rival Dallas Sidekicks on January 27, 2013.

San Diego also performed well at the box office, placing second in the league (behind only Dallas) in overage home attendance. The team advanced to the postseason and earned the right to play for the Ron Newman Cup in the PASL National Championship. The Sockers defeated the Turlock Express in two straight games, winning the Pacific Divisional Finals and advancing to the Semi-Finals in San Diego where they defeated the Las Vegas Legends in overtime. The team defeated the Detroit Waza 8–6 in regulation for the league championship on March 11, 2013.

The Sockers also participated in the 2012–13 United States Open Cup for Arena Soccer. They defeated the Arizona Storm in the Wild Card round, the Anaheim Bolts in the Round of 16, the Turlock Express in the Quarter-Finals, and the Las Vegas Legends in the Semi-Finals before losing 6–7 to the Detroit Waza in the Championship game on March 2, 2013.

== History ==
This is the third franchise to bear the "San Diego Sockers" name. The original Sockers were founded in 1978 and played in the NASL, original MISL, and the CISL before folding in 1996. The second Sockers were revived for the WISL in 2001 and transitioned to the second MISL in 2002 before folding in 2004.

The current Sockers franchise was founded in 2009 and played its first three seasons at the Chevrolet Del Mar Arena in Del Mar, California. For the 2012–13 season, the Sockers returned to the former San Diego Sports Arena (now the Valley View Casino Center) which hosted the indoor games of both of the previous Sockers franchises.

== Off-field moves ==
The majority of San Diego Sockers games were broadcast live on XEPE-AM (1700 AM, "ESPN Radio 1700") with Craig Elsten on play-by-play plus sideline reporter Tim Strombel at home games. (The Ron Newman Cup league championship game aired on XEPRS-AM, "The Mighty 1090".) The same team presented every regular season match as streaming audio on the Sockers' official website and their audio accompanied the video of America One Sports webcasts of Sockers games. 2012–13 is Elsten's fourth seasons the voice of the Sockers.

== Roster moves ==
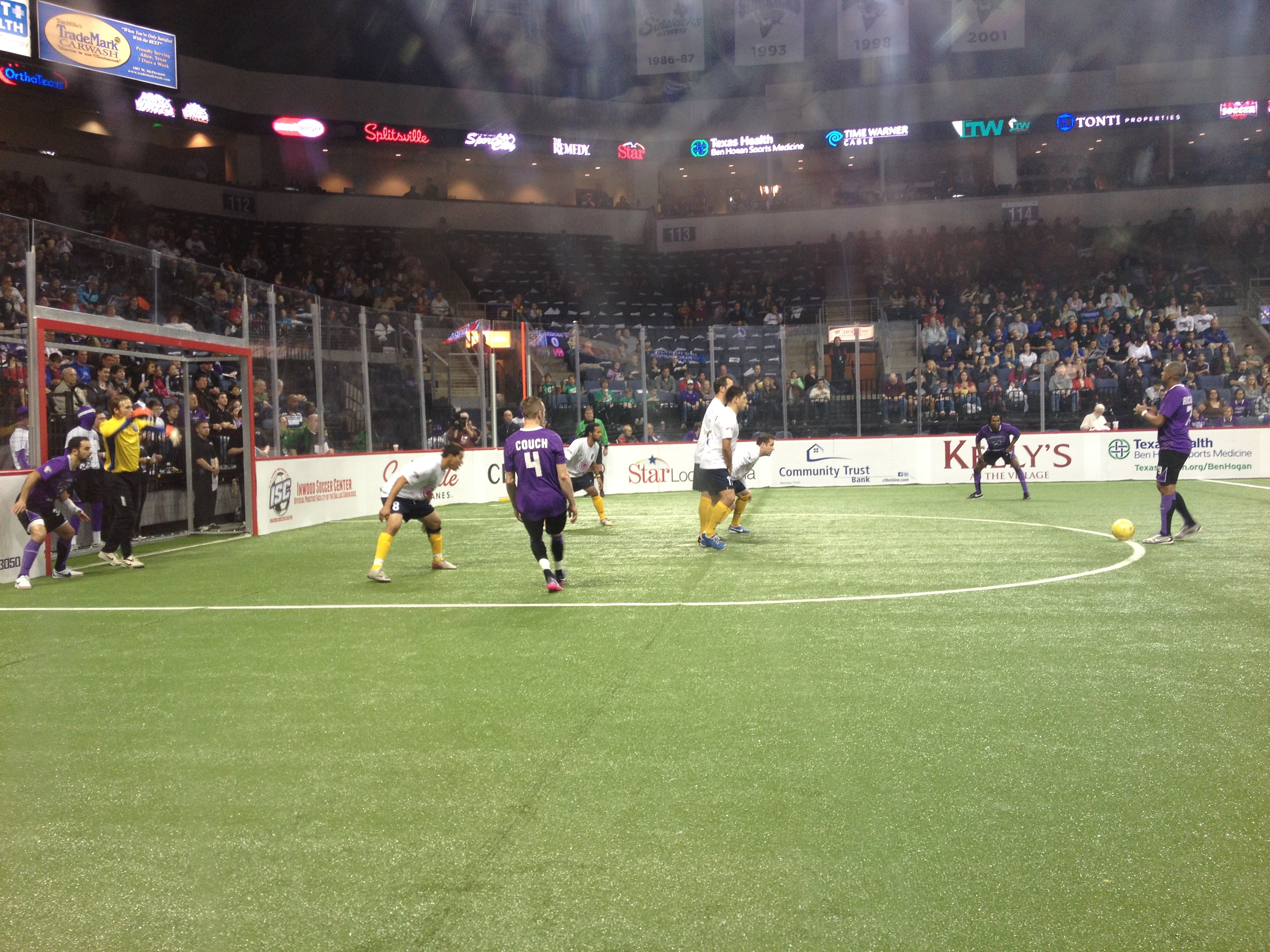
An action shot from the January 27, 2013, match between the Dallas Sidekicks and the San Diego Sockers at the Allen Event Center.

In October 2012, the team re-signed veteran forward Paul Wright for the 2012–13 season. Wright's 25-year professional soccer career began with the San Diego Nomads and continued with the Cleveland Crunch, the original San Diego Sockers, the Milwaukee Wave, the Los Angeles Salsa, the Baltimore Blast, the Wichita Wings, the Sacramento Knights, the Kansas City Wizards, the Western Mass Pioneers, the Philadelphia KiXX, the second San Diego Sockers, the San Diego Fusion, the Anaheim Bolts, and a previous stint with the current San Diego Sockers.

== Awards and honors ==
The San Diego Hall of Champions honors athletes with ties to the San Diego area each month by selecting its Stars of the Month. For November 2012, this list included Sockers forward Miguel "Chiky" Luna. For December 2012, the honorees included Sockers top-scorer Kraig Chiles. In January 2013, the Hall announced that Kraig Chiles was one of 15 area athletes selected as a 2012 Star of the Year. For January 2013, the honorees included high-scoring midfielder Brian Farber. For February 2013, the hall honored team captain Aaron Susi.

On November 27, 2012, citing his eight goals in the Sockers' match against Toros Mexico, the Professional Arena Soccer League named Kraig Chiles, the league's leading scorer and its reigning Most Valuable Player, as their Player of the Week. On December 25, 2012, the PASL named Sockers team captain Aaron Susi as their Player of the Week. The league cited the veteran's 2 goals and 3 assists in his team's victory over the Anaheim Bolts on December 22 as well as his 25 total points to date this season.

The team honored former Sockers player and coach Brian Quinn with a halftime ceremony during the January 5, 2013, game against the Turlock Express. Quinn played for the original Sockers franchise from 1983 to 1991 and later served as coach of both the original and first revival versions of the team. On January 2, 2013, the San Diego Hall of Champions announced that Quinn would be inducted into its Breitbard Hall of Fame on February 25, 2013, as part of the Class of 2013.

On January 22, 2013, the league cited his game-winning goal in the Sockers defeat of the Las Vegas Legends in naming Brian Farber as the PASL's Player of the Week. Farber scored two goals and two assists with the final score coming just 2.2 seconds before the end of regulation. It gave San Diego their first lead of the match and the win, preserving their record-setting winning streak and clinching the Pacific Division title for the team.

On February 5, 2013, the PASL named Kraig Chiles as its player of the week for the second time this season. The league cited his offensive performance against the Anaheim Bolts the previous weekend where he set a new regular season goal scoring record, breaking his own make from last season.

On February 12, 2013, the league named Kraig Chiles as its player of the week for the second week in a row and third time this season. Chiles broke the league points record held by Bernie Lilavois since the 2008–09 season. He also became the first player in PASL history to score 50 goals in a single season.

In postseason honors, forwards Kraig Chiles and Brian Farber were named to the 2012-13 PASL All-League First Team. Forward Aaron Susi was named to the 2012-13 PASL All-League Second Team and Chiles was also named the 2012-13 PASL Most Valuable Player.

== Schedule ==
Win Tie Loss

=== Regular season ===
Game	Day	Date	Kickoff	Opponent	Results		Location	Attendance
Game	Day	Date	Kickoff	Opponent	Final score	Record	Location	Attendance
1	Saturday	November 3	7:05pm	Sacramento Surge	W 15–2	1–0	Valley View Casino Center	3,545
2	Saturday	November 10	7:05pm	Real Phoenix	W 11–5	2–0	Valley View Casino Center	2,913
3	Saturday	November 17	5:05pm (4:05pm Pacific)	at Arizona Storm†	W 18–3	3–0	Arizona Sports Complex	125
4	Friday	November 23	7:35pm	Toros Mexico	W 14–4	4–0	Valley View Casino Center	4,134
5	Saturday	December 1	7:35pm	at Tacoma Stars	W 15–5	5–0	Pacific Sports Center	200
6	Saturday	December 8	8:00pm (7:00pm Pacific)	at Real Phoenix	W 9–3	6–0	Barney Family Sports Complex	220
7	Saturday	December 15	7:05pm	Tacoma Stars	W 14–4	7–0	Valley View Casino Center	2,586
8	Saturday	December 22	7:05pm	Anaheim Bolts†	W 14–3	8–0	Valley View Casino Center	2,923
9	Saturday	January 5	7:05pm	Turlock Express†	W 11–7	9–0	Valley View Casino Center	4,680
10	Friday	January 18	7:00pm	at Las Vegas Legends†	W 6–5	10–0	Orleans Arena	2,427
11	Friday	January 25	7:05pm (4:05pm Pacific)	at Harrisburg Heat	W 10–3	11–0	Farm Show Arena	1,250
12	Sunday	January 27	6:00pm (4:00pm Pacific)	at Dallas Sidekicks	L 5–6 (OT)	11–1	Allen Event Center	4,701
13	Friday	February 1	7:35pm	Dallas Sidekicks	W 5–4	12–1	Valley View Casino Center	4,474
14	Saturday	February 2	7:05pm	at Anaheim Bolts	W 10–6	13–1	Anaheim Convention Center	1,720
15	Sunday	February 10	6:05pm (5:05pm Pacific)	Arizona Storm	W 16–2	14–1	Valley View Casino Center	4,703
16	Sunday	February 17	1:00pm	at Toros Mexico	W 15–9	15–1	UniSantos Park	527

† Game also counts for US Open Cup, as listed in chart below.

=== Postseason ===
Round	Day	Date	Kickoff	Opponent	Results		Location	Attendance
Round	Day	Date	Kickoff	Opponent	Final score	Record	Location	Attendance
Division Finals Game 1	Saturday	February 23	7:00pm	Turlock Express	W 12–11 (OT)	1–0	Valley View Casino Center	3,048
Division Finals Game 2	Sunday	February 24	7:00pm	at Turlock Express	W 13–4	2–0	Orleans Arena	383
Semi-Finals	Sunday	March 10	6:30pm	Las Vegas Legends	W 6–5 (OT)	3–0	Valley View Casino Center	4,287
Championship	Monday	March 11	7:35pm (10:35pm Eastern)	Detroit Waza	W 8–6	4–0	Valley View Casino Center	3,336

=== 2012–13 US Open Cup for Arena Soccer ===
Game	Date	Kickoff	Opponent	Results		Location	Attendance
Game	Date	Kickoff	Opponent	Final score	Record	Location	Attendance
Wild Card	November 17	5:05pm (4:05pm Pacific)	at Arizona Storm	W 18–3	1–0	Arizona Sports Complex	125
Round of 16	December 22	7:05pm	Anaheim Bolts	W 14–3	2–0	Valley View Casino Center	2,923
Quarter-final	January 5	7:05pm	Turlock Express	W 11–7	3–0	Valley View Casino Center	4,680
Semi-final	January 18	7:00pm	at Las Vegas Legends	W 6–5	4–0	Orleans Arena	2,427
Championship	March 2	7:35pm (4:35pm Pacific)	at Detroit Waza	L 6–7	4–1	Melvindale Ice Arena	1,256
