= 2012–13 Anaheim Bolts season =

Anaheim Bolts
2012–13 PASL season
- Managing Partner: Bernie Lilavois
- Head Coach: Bernie Lilavois (until 12/15); Jeff Tackett (as of 12/21)
- Arena: Anaheim Convention Center; Anaheim, California
- PASL: 4th, Pacific
- US Open Cup: Round of 16
- Highest home attendance: 1,720 (February 2, 2013) vs San Diego Sockers
- Lowest home attendance: 689 (February 9, 2013) vs Rio Grande Valley Flash
- Average home league attendance: 1,035 (over 8 home games)

The 2012–13 Anaheim Bolts season was the fourth and final season of the Anaheim Bolts professional indoor soccer club, their second in the Professional Arena Soccer League. The Bolts, a Pacific Division team, played their home games at "Bolts Arena" in the Anaheim Convention Center in Anaheim, California. The team was led by managing partner Bernie Lilavois and interim head coach Jeff Tackett.

== Season summary ==
The Bolts had mixed results in the regular season, compiling a 6–10 record. They placed fourth in the PASL's five-team Pacific Division and failed to advance to the postseason. The franchise fared better at the box office, placing sixth among the league's 19 teams in average home attendance.

The Bolts participated in the 2012–13 United States Open Cup for Arena Soccer. They received a bye in the wild-card round then lost to the San Diego Sockers in the Round of 16, ending their run in the tournament.

== Off-field moves ==
For the 2012-13 season, six of the eight Bolts' regular season home games are scheduled to be broadcast in English by KDOC-TV and in Spanish by Global TV. These games will be televised at 4:00pm PST on Sundays on a tape-delayed basis. The matches will be video-streamed live on the internet by Liquid Event TV and as internet radio by Kaotic Radio. Spanish-language play-by-play is handled by Oscar Sosa with English-language broadcasts handled by Nolan Sieger.

Bernie Lilavois, who began the season as both the team's general manager and head coach, announced that he would give up his coaching role after the December 15th match to focus on the team's operations as general manager. He cited recent problems with field turf, low attendance, and organizational issues in coming to this decision.

On December 21, 2012, the team announced the promotion of assistant coach Jeff Tackett to the role of "interim head coach" for the remainder of the season.

== Roster moves ==
On November 27, 2012, the team announced the transfer signing of midfielder Jayro Martinez from Futbol Club Santa Clarita Storm of the National Premier Soccer League.

In early February 2013, the team added Japanese players Ryosuke Tarui and Yudai Yamaguchi to the roster.

== Schedule ==
Win Tie Loss

=== Regular season ===
Game	Day	Date	Kickoff	Opponent	Results		Location	Attendance
Game	Day	Date	Kickoff	Opponent	Final score	Record	Location	Attendance
1	Friday	November 2	7:00pm	Sacramento Surge	W 13–5	1–0	Anaheim Convention Center	1,394
2	Sunday	November 4	2:00pm	at Las Vegas Legends	W 11–8	2–0	Orleans Arena	1,145
3	Sunday	November 11	6:30pm (5:30pm Pacific)	at Arizona Storm	L 13–14	2–1	Arizona Sports Complex	125
4	Friday	November 30	7:00pm	at Turlock Express	L 12–13 (OT)	2–2	Turlock Soccer Complex	531
5	Saturday	December 1	7:30pm	at Sacramento Surge	W 10–2	3–2	Off the Wall Soccer Arena	293
6	Sunday	December 9	4:00pm	Turlock Express	L 12–17	3–3	Anaheim Convention Center	928
7	Saturday	December 15	6:05pm (5:05pm Pacific)	at Arizona Storm	L 6–12	3–4	Arizona Sports Complex	45
8	Saturday	December 22	7:05pm	at San Diego Sockers†	L 3–14	3–5	Valley View Casino Center	2,923
9	Thursday	December 27	7:00pm	Toros Mexico	W 12–8	4–5	Anaheim Convention Center	1,114
10	Saturday	January 5	7:00pm	Tacoma Stars	W 8–7	5–5	Anaheim Convention Center	819
11	Saturday	January 12	7:00pm	Sacramento Surge	W 15–5	6–5	Anaheim Convention Center	852
12	Saturday	January 19	7:35pm	at Tacoma Stars	L 9–12	6–6	Pacific Sports Center	350
13	Sunday	January 20	2:05pm	at Tacoma Stars	L 7–9	6–7	Pacific Sports Center	150
14	Saturday	February 2	7:00pm	San Diego Sockers	L 6–10	6–8	Anaheim Convention Center	1,720
15	Saturday	February 9	7:00pm	Rio Grande Valley Flash	L 4–18	6–9	Anaheim Convention Center	689
16	Sunday	February 17	4:00pm	Las Vegas Legends	L 5–20	6–10	Anaheim Convention Center	769

† Game also counts for US Open Cup, as listed in chart below.

=== 2012–13 US Open Cup for Arena Soccer ===
Game	Date	Kickoff	Opponent	Results		Location	Attendance
Game	Date	Kickoff	Opponent	Final score	Record	Location	Attendance
Wild Card	December 14	BYE					
Round of 16	December 22	7:05pm	at San Diego Sockers	L 3–14	0–1	Valley View Casino Center	2,923
