= 2013–14 Monterrey Flash season =

Monterrey Flash
2013–14 PASL season
- Owner: Gerardo Guerra Lozano
- Head Coach: Genoni Martínez
- Arena: Arena Monterrey; Ave. Madero #2500 Oriente, Colonia Obrera; Monterrey, Nuevo León, Mexico; C.P. 64800
- Professional Arena Soccer League: 3rd, Central
- Ron Newman Cup: Division Final
- Highest home attendance: 9,627 (November 13 vs. Hidalgo La Fiera) (PASL record)
- Lowest home attendance: 4,788 (December 21 vs. Texas Strikers)
- Average home league attendance: 5,857 (8 games)

The 2013–14 Monterrey Flash season was the first season of the new Monterrey Flash professional indoor soccer club. The Monterrey Flash, a Central Division team in the Professional Arena Soccer League, played their home games in Arena Monterrey in Monterrey, Nuevo León, Mexico.

The team was led by owner Gerardo Guerra Lozano and head coach Genoni Martínez with assistant coach Marco Coria. The team finished the regular season with a 13–3 record, good enough for 3rd in the Central Division and qualified for the post-season. They were eliminated in the Central Division Final by Hidalgo La Fiera.

== Season summary ==
The Flash started their debut season strong with an overtime win over Hidalgo La Fiera then six more victories, including only the second shootout in PASL history. Their first loss also came against Hidalgo on December 15. The Flash split the season series with their cross-border rivals, each club winning its two home matches. Their only other loss came against the visiting San Diego Sockers on January 26. Originally scheduled to wrap the regular season on February 2, the game against Saltillo Rancho Seco was rescheduled for February 16 to avoid conflicting with Super Bowl XLVIII. The Flash finished 13–3 and secured the third spot in the Central Division playoffs. They defeated the Dallas Sidekicks in the Division Semifinal then lost to Hidalgo La Fiera in the Division Final.

The Monterrey Flash, along with the other two Mexico-based PASL teams, did not participate in the 2013–14 United States Open Cup for Arena Soccer.

== History ==
The previous team to bear the Monterrey Flash name joined the Liga Mexicana de Futbol Rápido Profesional (LMFRPro) in 2011. They won the LMFRPro league championship in that first season then finished second to the San Diego Sockers in the 2012 FIFRA Club Championship. In September 2012, Lozano relocated the team to Texas, renamed them the Rio Grande Valley Flash, and the PASL. In July 2013, the team announced that Victor Fernandez had assumed ownership of the franchise and renamed it "La Fiera FC".

Lozano returned to Monterrey and started a new Monterrey Flash with the intention of playing in both the LMFRPro and the PASL. The new Flash are one of three Mexico-based teams (along with Saltillo Rancho Seco and Toros Mexico) participating in the PASL for the 2013–14 season.

== Roster moves ==
Legendary Argentinian midfielder Walter Gaitán joined the Flash roster at the start of the season but announced his intention to return to Argentina after the November 21 match against Saltillo Rancho Seco.

In early December 2013, the Flash acquired forward Victor Martinez Baez from Saltillo Rancho Seco.

== Awards and honors ==
On November 19, 2013, the Professional Arena Soccer League named forward Erick Tovar as the PASL Player of the Week. The league cited his outstanding offensive contribution to his team's success, including multiple game-winning goals.

On February 26, 2014, the PASL announced its "All-League" honors. Defender Genoni Martinez was one of six players named to the All-League First Team.

== Schedule ==
Win Loss

=== Exhibition ===
Game	Day	Date	Kickoff	Opponent	Results		Location	Attendance
Game	Day	Date	Kickoff	Opponent	Score	Record	Location	Attendance
1	Friday	October 25	4:00pm	Universidad de Monterrey	W 9–1	1–0	Arena Monterrey	2,500
2	Saturday	November 30	7:30pm	Austin Capitals (PASL-Premier)	W 9–1	2–0	Soccer Zone South Austin	
3	Saturday	February 8	4:00pm	Tigres de la UANL	W 6–1	3–0	Ciudad Universitaria	

=== Regular season ===
Game	Day	Date	Kickoff	Opponent	Results		Location	Attendance
Game	Day	Date	Kickoff	Opponent	Score	Record	Location	Attendance
1	Sunday	November 3	5:05pm	Hidalgo La Fiera	W 6–5 (OT)	1–0	Arena Monterrey	9,627
2	Saturday	November 9	6:35pm	at Saltillo Rancho Seco	W 9–6	2–0	UAdeC Arena	550
3	Saturday	November 16	7:05pm	at San Diego Sockers	W 6–5 (SO)	3–0	Valley View Casino Center	3,922
4	Sunday	November 17	1:05pm	at Toros Mexico	W 10–6	4–0	UniSantos Park	363
5	Thursday	November 21	8:35pm	Saltillo Rancho Seco	W 9–5	5–0	Arena Monterrey	4,927
6	Saturday	November 23	7:05pm	at Texas Strikers	W 13–4	6–0	Ford Arena	422
7	Friday	December 13	7:05pm	at Texas Strikers	W 7–2	7–0	Ford Arena	377
8	Sunday	December 15	7:05pm	at Hidalgo La Fiera	L 4–5 (OT)	7–1	State Farm Arena	1,242
9	Friday	December 20	8:35pm	Ontario Fury	W 13–6	8–1	Arena Monterrey	5,235
10	Saturday	December 21	7:05pm	Texas Strikers	W 12–1	9–1	Arena Monterrey	4,788
11	Saturday	January 4	7:05pm	at Saltillo Rancho Seco	W 8–3	10–1	Deportivo Rancho-Seco Saltillo	500
12	Sunday	January 12	5:05pm	Hidalgo La Fiera	W 11–6	11–1	Arena Monterrey	7,123
13	Saturday	January 18	7:35pm	at Hidalgo La Fiera	L 1–7	11–2	State Farm Arena	1,264
14	Sunday	January 19	5:05pm	Texas Strikers	W 15–5	12–2	Arena Monterrey	4,789
15	Sunday	January 26	5:05pm	San Diego Sockers	L 6–8	12–3	Arena Monterrey	4,891
16	Saturday	February 16	5:05pm	Saltillo Rancho Seco♥	W 10–2	13–3	Arena Monterrey	5,482

♥ Rescheduled from February 2 at league request.

=== Post-season ===
Round	Day	Date	Kickoff	Opponent	Results		Location	Attendance
Round	Day	Date	Kickoff	Opponent	Score	Record	Location	Attendance
Central Division Semifinal	Saturday	February 22	7:05pm	at Dallas Sidekicks	W 6–4	1–0	Allen Event Center	4,849
Central Division Final	Saturday	March 1	7:05pm	at Hidalgo La Fiera	L 8–9	1–1	State Farm Arena	1,322
