= 2012–13 Toros Mexico season =

Toros Mexico
2012–13 PASL season
- Owner: Joe Pollard
- Head Coach: Joe Pollard
- Arena: UniSantos Park; Tijuana, Mexico
- PASL: 2nd, Southwestern
- Ron Newman Cup: Lost division finals
- US Open Cup: DNP
- Highest home attendance: 527 (February 17, 2013) vs San Diego Sockers
- Lowest home attendance: 100 (December 16, 2012) vs Tacoma Stars
- Average home league attendance: 285 (over 8 home games)

The 2012–13 Toros Mexico season was the fourth season of the Toros Mexico professional indoor soccer club but first under the "Toros Mexico" name. The Toros, a Southwestern Division team in the Professional Arena Soccer League, played their home games at UniSantos Park in Tijuana, Mexico. The team was led by owner and head coach Joe Pollard.

== Season summary ==
The team had mixed results in the regular season, compiling a 7–9 record, but placed second in the PASL's Southwest Division. The Toros fared better at home than on the road, dropping six of their eight away matches. The team advanced to the postseason and earned the right to play for the Ron Newman Cup in the PASL National Championship. The Toros lost two straight games to the Las Vegas Legends in the Divisional Finals, ending their playoff run.

The Toros did not participate in the 2012–13 United States Open Cup for Arena Soccer.

== History ==
The Toros played the 2009–10, 2010–11, and 2011–12 seasons as "Revolución Tijuana". In September 2012, Ramon Quezada and Eduardo Vele sold the team to head coach Joe Pollard but retained the rights to the old name and logo.

The team's road loss to the San Diego Sockers on November 23, 2012, gave the Sockers the new United States record for consecutive wins by a professional soccer team.

== Off-field moves ==
As part of the Toros Mexico commitment to social work, the team visited the Casa Hogar La Esperanza orphanage on December 20, 2012, to entertain the children, bring them gifts, and play exhibition soccer with the residents.

== Schedule ==
Win Tie Loss

=== Regular season ===
| Game | Day | Date | Kickoff | Opponent | Results | | Location | Attendance |
| Game | Day | Date | Kickoff | Opponent | Final Score | Record | Location | Attendance |
|---|---|---|---|---|---|---|---|---|
| 1 | Saturday | November 3 | 8:00pm | at Real Phoenix | L 3–4 | 0–1 | Barney Family Sports Complex | 227 |
| 2 | Sunday | November 11 | 3:00pm | Real Phoenix | W 11–6 | 1–1 | UniSantos Park | 442 |
| 3 | Sunday | November 18 | 3:00pm | Las Vegas Legends | L 3–13 | 1–2 | UniSantos Park | 314 |
| 4 | Friday | November 23 | 7:35pm | at San Diego Sockers | L 4–14 | 1–3 | Valley View Casino Center | 4,134 |
| 5 | Sunday | December 9 | 1:00pm | at Las Vegas Legends | L 9–16 | 1–4 | Orleans Arena | 1,246 |
| 6 | Sunday | December 16 | 3:00pm | Tacoma Stars | W 15–3 | 2–4 | UniSantos Park | 100 |
| 7 | Sunday | December 23 | 4:00pm (3:00pm Pacific) | Real Phoenix | W 17–9 | 3–4 | UniSantos Park | 150 |
| 8 | Thursday | December 27 | 7:00pm | at Anaheim Bolts | L 8–12 | 3–5 | Anaheim Convention Center | 1,114 |
| 9 | Sunday | January 6 | 1:00pm | Turlock Express | W 13–10 | 4–5 | UniSantos Park | 200 |
| 10 | Sunday | January 13 | 3:00pm | Sacramento Surge | W 12–3 | 5–5 | UniSantos Park | 250 |
| 11 | Friday | January 18 | 7:30pm | at Turlock Express | W 10–9 (OT) | 6–5 | Turlock Soccer Complex | 500 |
| 12 | Saturday | January 19 | 7:00pm | at Sacramento Surge | L 2–3 | 6–6 | Off the Wall Soccer Arena | 500 |
| 13 | Saturday | January 26 | 8:00 (7:00pm Pacific) | at Real Phoenix | W 8–7 (OT) | 7–6 | Arizona Sports Complex | 560 |
| 14 | Saturday | February 2 | 7:35pm | at Tacoma Stars | L 5–6 | 7–7 | Pacific Sports Center | 600 |
| 15 | Sunday | February 10 | 1:00pm | Rio Grande Valley Flash | L 2–6 | 7–8 | UniSantos Park | 300 |
| 16 | Sunday | February 17 | 1:00pm | San Diego Sockers | L 9–15 | 7–9 | UniSantos Park | 527 |

=== Postseason ===
| Round | Day | Date | Kickoff | Opponent | Results | | Location | Attendance |
| Round | Day | Date | Kickoff | Opponent | Final Score | Record | Location | Attendance |
|---|---|---|---|---|---|---|---|---|
| Division Finals Game 1 | Saturday | February 23 | 3:30pm | Las Vegas Legends | L 8–10 | 0–1 | Valley View Casino Center | 412 |
| Division Finals Game 2 | Sunday | February 24 | 4:00pm | at Las Vegas Legends | L 4–10 | 0–2 | Orleans Arena | 1,023 |
