= Adriano de Lima =

Brazilian footballer (born 1981)

Adriano De Lima
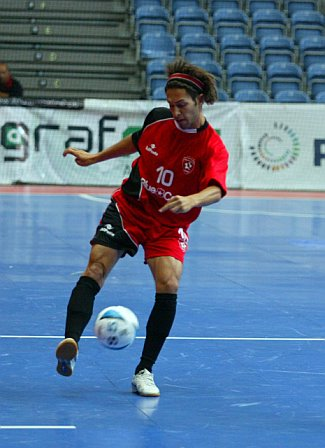

Personal information
- Full name: Adriano Vieira De Lima
- Date of birth: July 30, 1981 (age 45)
- Place of birth: São Paulo, Brazil
- Height: 5 ft 9 in (1.75 m)
- Positions: Midfielder; forward

Youth career
- 1988–1990: Pequeninos do Jóquei
- 1990–1996: Itaguá F.C.
- 1996-1999: SC Corinthians Paulista (youth)
- 1999–2000: Cypress College
- 2000-2002: Cal State Fullerton

Senior career*
Years	Team	Apps	(Gls)
1999–2000	Atlas F.C.		
2003	San Diego Sockers		
2003	Flamengo		
2004-2010	LA Blues | Orange County SC	35	(26)
2011-2013	Anaheim Bolts	56	(95)

International career
2012-2013	US Beach Soccer Team	5	
- * Club domestic league appearances and goals

Adriano Vieira De Lima (born 30 July 1981 in São Paulo) is a Brazilian retired footballer who last played for Los Angeles Blues in the USL Professional Division.

== Career ==
=== Youth, College and Amateur ===
Adriano De Lima played in many youth clubs in Brazil, including Itaguá and Pequeninos do Jóquei, Sport Club Corinthians Paulista Sub-16 team, and briefly played professionally in Brazil for Itaguá, before moving to the United States in 1999 to play college soccer at Cypress College in Cypress, California. He transferred to California State University, Fullerton in 2001, and played two more seasons there.

=== Professional ===
After playing professional indoor soccer for the San Diego Sockers in the MISL in 2003, De Lima returned to Brazil to join Flamengo. After returning to the United States, Adriano De Lima played professional beach soccer for SoCal Beach in Oceanside, California, and in 2007 participated in the Futsal World Club Championship in the Algarve in Portugal for World United.

Adriano De Lima signed with the Los Angeles Blues in the USL Professional Division in 2011; he made his debut for the Blues on May 1, 2011, in a 1–0 defeat to Antigua Barracuda

Adriano De Lima signed with Anaheim Bolts Professional Indoor Team for the 2012–13 Professional Arena Soccer League and 2013–14 Professional Arena Soccer League seasons. Adriano de Lima made the All-Professional Arena Soccer League team, the only first-team selection not from PASL Pro titlist San Diego or runner-up Detroit.

== Personal ==
Adriano De Lima coaches soccer and owns Culture FC Sports, a community club, soccer school and travel organization that provides soccer players and teams with opportunities in the USA and around the world.

Adriano De Lima was also part of the Nike skills team as a sponsored athlete, promoting and helping develop the game in the United States. He traveled all over the country and the world as an ambassador of the sport, entertaining and influencing soccer players of all ages and levels. He also participated in many soccer ads and campaigns, and in the video game FIFA Street 2.
