= 2012–13 Professional Arena Soccer League season =

Professional Arena Soccer League
- Season: 2012–13
- Champions: San Diego Sockers
- Matches: 151
- Goals: 2,292 (15.18 per match)
- Top goalscorer: Kraig Chiles SDS; 56 Goals (PASL Record)
- Biggest home win: DAL 21-1 TEX (December 15)
- Biggest away win: SDS 18-3 ARI (November 17)
- Highest scoring: TUR 17-12 ANA (December 9)
- Longest winning run: 11 Games: San Diego Sockers (November 3-January 25)
- Longest losing run: 13 Games: Ohio Vortex (November 24-February 16)
- Highest attendance: 5,909; HAR @ DAL (November 3) (PASL Record)
- Lowest attendance: 45; ANA @ ARI (December 15) (PASL Record)
- Average attendance: 968

2012–13 Professional Arena Soccer League (PASL) season is the fifth season for the American indoor soccer league. The season started on November 1, 2012, and ended on February 23, 2013. This season, the league expanded to 19 teams divided into four divisions.

== Standings ==
As of February 23, 2013
2012-13 League Championship
2012-13 Playoff Team
(Bold) Division Winner

Place	Team	GP	W	L	Pct	GF	GA	GB
Eastern Division
1	Detroit Waza	16	14	2	.875	162	80	—
2	Cincinnati Kings	16	11	5	.688	118	71	3.0
3	Harrisburg Heat	16	6	10	.375	106	102	8.0
4	Illinois Piasa	16	4	12	.250	89	132	10.0
5	Ohio Vortex	16	1	15	.063	40	169	13.0
Central Division
1	Dallas Sidekicks	16	13	3	.813	140	61	—
2	Rio Grande Valley Flash	16	12	4	.750	150	69	1.0
3	Chicago Mustangs	16	11	5	.688	146	104	2.0
4	Rockford Rampage	16	7	9	.438	100	103	5.0
5	Texas Strikers	16	3	13	.188	76	192	10.0
Southwestern Division
1	Las Vegas Legends	16	13	3	.813	174	81	—
2	Toros Mexico	16	7	9	.438	131	136	6.0
3	Arizona Storm	16	6	10	.375	102	174	7.0
4	Real Phoenix	16	4	12	.250	100	161	9.0
Pacific Division
1	San Diego Sockers	16	15	1	.938	188	71	—
2	Turlock Express	16	9	7	.563	150	127	6.0
3	Tacoma Stars	15	8	7	.534	116	136	6.5
4	Anaheim Bolts	16	6	10	.375	146	174	9.0
5	Sacramento Surge	15	1	14	.067	58	149	13.5

== Statistics ==
=== Top scorers ===
Rank	Scorer	Club	Games	Goals	Assists	Points
1	(United States) Kraig Chiles	San Diego Sockers	16	56	16	72
2	(United States) Enrique Tovar	Las Vegas Legends	16	24	33	57
3	(United States) Aaron Susi	San Diego Sockers	15	19	32	51
4	(Mexico) Nestor Hernandez	Chicago Mustangs	16	38	12	50
4	(Brazil) Ricardo Sobreira	Las Vegas Legends	16	22	28	50
6	(United States) Ivan Campos	Turlock Express	16	33	15	48
7	(Brazil) Adriano de Lima	Anaheim Bolts	12	33	13	46
7	(United States) Brian Farber	San Diego Sockers	15	26	20	46
9	(United States) Adrian Gutierrez	Turlock Express	16	18	24	42
10	(Mexico) Omar Tapia	Chicago Mustangs	16	17	19	36

Last updated on February 23, 2013. Source: PASL Statistics - Total Points

== 2013 Ron Newman Cup ==
=== Playoff format ===
Each of the four divisions pitted their first and second-place teams against one another in a home-and-home format. A 30-minute mini-game would have been held immediately after Game 2 if the series was tied at one win apiece. The Semi-Final and Championship games were single elimination and hosted by the San Diego Sockers, the team with the best regular season record. The Semi-Finals were held on Sunday, March 10, 2013, with the Championship game the following day, Monday, March 11, 2013.

=== Bracket ===
Division Finals; February 23–28
E1	Detroit Waza	9	6
E2	Cincinnati Kings	4	5
C1	Dallas Sidekicks	4	5
C2	Rio Grande Valley Flash	5	8
SW1	Las Vegas Legends	10	10
SW2	Toros Mexico	8	4
P1	San Diego Sockers	12	13
P2	Turlock Express	11	4

Semifinals; March 10
E1	Detroit Waza	6
C2	Rio Grande Valley Flash	5
SW1	Las Vegas Legends	5
P1	San Diego Sockers	6

Championship; March 11
E1	Detroit Waza	6
P1	San Diego Sockers	8

=== Schedule ===
Divisional Finals Leg 1

February 23, 2013
3:30 PM PST

Toros Mexico	8 - 10	Las Vegas Legends
	Report

Valley View Casino Center
San Diego, California
Attendance: 412
February 23, 2013
8:30 PM EST

Cincinnati Kings	4 - 9	Detroit Waza
	Report

GameTime Training Center
Fairfield, Ohio
Attendance: 307
February 23, 2013
7:00 PM PST

San Diego Sockers	12 - 11 (OT)	Turlock Express
	Report

Valley View Casino Center
San Diego, California
Attendance: 3,048
February 24, 2013
3:00 PM CST

Rio Grande Valley Flash	5 - 4 (OT)	Dallas Sidekicks
	Report

State Farm Arena
Hidalgo, Texas
Attendance: 1,600

Divisional Finals Leg 2

February 24, 2013
2:35 PM EST

Detroit Waza	6 - 5	Cincinnati Kings
	Report

Melvindale Ice Arena
Melvindale, Michigan
Attendance: 680
February 24, 2013
4:00 PM PST

Las Vegas Legends	10 - 4	Toros Mexico
	Report

Orleans Arena
Las Vegas, Nevada
Attendance: 1,023
February 24, 2013
7:00 PM PST

Turlock Express	4 - 13	San Diego Sockers
	Report

Orleans Arena
Las Vegas, Nevada
Attendance: 383
February 28, 2013
7:30 PM CST

Dallas Sidekicks	5 - 8	Rio Grande Valley Flash
	Report

Allen Event Center
Allen, Texas
Attendance: 3,274

Semi-Finals

March 10, 2013
4:00 PM PST

Detroit Waza	6 - 5 (OT)	Rio Grande Valley Flash
	Report

Valley View Casino Center
San Diego, California
March 10, 2013
6:30 PM PST

San Diego Sockers	6 - 5 (OT)	Las Vegas Legends
	Report

Valley View Casino Center
San Diego, California
Attendance: 4,287

Championship

March 11, 2013
7:35 PM PST

San Diego Sockers	8 - 6	Detroit Waza
	Report; Report

Valley View Casino Center
San Diego, California
Attendance: 3,336

== Awards ==
=== Player of the Week ===
Week	Date	Player	Pos.	Team
1	November 4, 2012	Jeff Hughes	MF	Cincinnati Kings
2	November 11, 2012	Ante Cop	GK	Rockford Rampage
3	November 18, 2012	Mike Mason	GK	Ohio Vortex
4	November 25, 2012	Kraig Chiles	FW	San Diego Sockers
5	December 1, 2012	Ivan Campos	MF	Turlock Express
6	December 8, 2012	Alan Hagerty	GK	Illinois Piasa
7	December 15, 2012	Rodrigo Barbirato	FW	Las Vegas Legends
8	December 22, 2012	Aaron Susi	FW	San Diego Sockers
9	December 29, 2012	Nestor Hernandez	MF	Chicago Mustangs
10	January 6, 2013	Joe Kapinos	GK	Detroit Waza
11	January 13, 2013	Ricardo Lopes	DF	Detroit Waza
12	January 20, 2013	Brian Farber	MF	San Diego Sockers
13	January 27, 2013	Jamie Lovegrove	FW	Dallas Sidekicks
14	February 2, 2013	Kraig Chiles	FW	San Diego Sockers
15	February 9, 2013	Kraig Chiles	FW	San Diego Sockers
16	February 16, 2013	Enrique Tovar	FW	Las Vegas Legends

=== Individual awards ===
Award	Name	Team
League MVP	Kraig Chiles	San Diego Sockers
Coach of the Year	Tatu	Dallas Sidekicks
Playoffs MVP	Kraig Chiles	San Diego Sockers

=== All-League First Team ===
Name	Position	Team
Costea Decu	D	Detroit Waza
Eric Guzman	D	Las Vegas Legends
Brian Farber	M	San Diego Sockers
Nestor Hernandez	F	Chicago Mustangs
Kraig Chiles	F	San Diego Sockers
Sagu	GK	Dallas Sidekicks

=== All-League Second Team ===
Name	Position	Team
Kiley Couch	D	Dallas Sidekicks
Damian Garcia	D	Rio Grande Valley Flash
Ivan Campos	F	Turlock Express
Enrique Tovar	F	Las Vegas Legends
Aaron Susi	F	San Diego Sockers
Joe Kapinos	GK	Detroit Waza
