= Boris Pardo =

American soccer player

Personal information
- Date of birth: March 22, 1984 (age 42)
- Place of birth: Hillside, New Jersey, United States
- Height: 6 ft 1 in (1.85 m)
- Position: Goalkeeper

College career
Years	Team	Apps	(Gls)
2001–2005	Seton Hall Pirates		

Senior career*
Years	Team	Apps	(Gls)
2007	MLS Pool	–	(–)
2007	→ Toronto FC (loan)	0	(0)
2007	→ FC Dallas (loan)	0	(0)
2007	→ Sporting Kansas City (loan)	0	(0)
2008	Sporting Kansas City Reserves		
2010–2013	Missouri Comets (indoor)	9	(0)
2014–2015	Wichita B-52s (indoor)	17	(0)
2015–2016	Missouri Comets (indoor)	19	(0)
2016–	San Diego Sockers (indoor)	130	(2)

International career
2017	United States (minifootball)		

Managerial career
- 2022: Union Omaha (goalkeepers)
- * Club domestic league appearances and goals as of August 19, 2025

Boris Pardo (born March 22, 1984) is an American soccer player who plays as a goalkeeper for the San Diego Sockers of the Major Arena Soccer League.

== Career ==
=== Club career ===
Pardo started his career with Canadian side Toronto FC. Before the 2009 season, he signed for Sporting KC in the American top flight. On 30 June 2009, Pardo debuted for Sporting KC during a 3–3 draw with the Minnesota Thunder.

In 2010, he signed for indoor soccer club Missouri Comets. In 2017, he signed for San Diego Sockers in the American top flight, helping them win the league.

=== International career ===
Pardo represented the United States at the 2017 WMF World Cup. He was eligible to represent Chile internationally through his parents.
