= 2013–14 Professional Arena Soccer League season =

Professional Arena Soccer League
- Season: 2013–14
- Champions: Chicago Mustangs
- Matches: 159
- Goals: 2,483 (15.62 per match)
- Top goalscorer: Efrain Martinez CHI; Bryan Moya CHI; 40 Goals
- Biggest home win: MEX 27-2 BAY (February 15) (PASL Record)
- Biggest away win: DAL 15-1 TEX (January 11)
- Highest scoring: CLE 27-6 ILL (January 4)
- Longest unbeaten run: 16 Games: Chicago Mustangs (unbeaten season)
- Longest losing run: 15 Games: Texas Strikers (November 10-February 8)
- Highest attendance: 9,627; HLF @ MON (November 3) (PASL Record)
- Lowest attendance: 109; CHI @ ILL (January 11)
- Average attendance: 1,349

The 2013–14 Professional Arena Soccer League season was the sixth season for the PASL, an American professional indoor soccer league. The regular season started on November 1, 2013, and ended on February 16, 2014. After regional playoffs in late February, the three regional winners and host Chicago Mustangs competed at the Sears Centre for the Ron Newman Cup on March 15–16, 2014. The Mustangs capped a perfect season by winning the league championship.

== Teams ==
=== Returning clubs ===
In advance of news from the league's 2013 summer meetings, the exact size and composition of the PASL for the 2013–14 season was unclear. Reigning champion San Diego Sockers and league attendance leader Dallas Sidekicks were sure to return. The Sockers were scheduled to play an outdoor exhibition match against a Mexico All-Stars team at Balboa Stadium on September 1. The game was the first outdoor contest for the Sockers since 1984.

The Harrisburg Heat announced in early July 2013 that head coach Richard Chinapoo and assistant Gino DiFlorio would return to lead the team for the 2013–14 season. On July 24, Chinapoo announced that this season would be his last in Harrisburg as he will move to Florida in August 2014 to be with his wife and daughter. The Heat scheduled two open tryouts at Sports City Harrisburg, the first on September 15 and the second on October 6. Training camp for the team opened on October 21.

Last season's Central Division champion Rio Grande Valley Flash returned under new ownership as "La Fiera FC". Head coach Mariano Bollella also returned to lead the team at State Farm Arena. In late July, the team announced Joaquín García Fernández as its new president. By league mandate, the team's name was changed to Hidalgo La Fiera to reflect its home city.

On July 19, 2013, the Illinois Piasa announced that they would play this season at The Field Sports Complex in Pontoon Beach, Illinois. Formerly known as "Sports For Fun", this facility had been the Piasa's home turf from 2008 through 2011. On July 22, the team announced that head coach Jason Norsic had resigned for personal and family reasons. The team scheduled open tryouts for August 24–25 at The Field Sports Complex.

=== Contraction ===
Teams that struggled at the box office, were taken over by the league, or were unable to relocate to meet the league's new 1,000-seat minimum for home arenas variously sought demotion, suspension, or dissolution. In late May 2013, the ownership of the Anaheim Bolts announced that due to increasing costs and poor attendance they would seek a new buyer for the franchise and that the team would not play in the 2013–14 season. July 2013 press reports stated that Rockford Rampage and Real Phoenix would not return for this season. Without fanfare, the league removed the Ohio Vortex and Arizona Storm from their list of affiliated teams in August 2013. The Tacoma Stars went on hiatus for the 2013–14 season on August 23, 2013. The organization instead fielded a squad called "Tacoma Galaxy" in the Premier Arena Soccer League.

=== Expansion ===
The PASL added several new teams for the 2013–14 season:

- Originally announced in July 2012, the Tulsa Revolution played at the Tulsa Convention Center in Tulsa, Oklahoma. The team held its first open tryout in mid-July 2013. The Williams Companies signed as the team's presenting sponsor for their debut season.
- In late May 2013, the owners of the now-dormant Anaheim Bolts announced that they would instead field a new PASL team at the Citizens Business Bank Arena in Ontario, California. The team held its first open tryouts on June 28–29. On July 25, team president Bernie Lilavois announced that "Ontario Fury" was chosen from over 500 fan-submitted entries in a name-the-team contest. The name, logo, and team colors all reflect the passion of local soccer fans and the "powerful elements" of heat and wind that characterize the Inland Empire climate.
- In June 2013, the Wichita Wings of the MISL folded but a successor corporation named FC Wichita LLC announced their intention to join the PASL for the 2013–14 season. The name and home arena for the Wichita, Kansas, based team were not immediately announced. On July 10, the team announced that it secured a lease at Hartman Arena but planned to delay joining the PASL until the 2014–15 season. On July 23, the PASL announced that a different ownership group had secured its own Hartman Arena lease and the franchise to play in Wichita for the 2013–14 season. On August 22, the team announced that it would play as the "Wichita B-52s" to honor the city's aviation heritage. Indoor soccer veteran Larry Inlow serves as head coach.
- The league also added the expansion Cleveland Freeze, Mexico-based teams Monterrey Flash and Saltillo Rancho Seco, plus Bay Area Rosal and the Cincinnati Saints moved up from the PASL-Premier to the pro league.

=== Launch delayed ===
In April 2013, the league announced that a new team would play at the Laredo Energy Arena in Laredo, Texas. A fan contest in May 2013 named the team "Laredo Diesel" but, citing marketability, franchise owner Dr. Judson Somerville changed the name to Laredo Honey Badgers on July 24. On September 27, 2013, the team confirmed that, due to the financial and legal difficulties faced by their owner, they would delay entry into the league until the 2014–15 season.

== Standings ==
As of 2/16/2014
2013-14 League Championship
2013-14 Playoff Team
(Bold) Division Winner

Place	Team	GP	W	L	Pct	GF	GA	GB
Eastern Division
1	Chicago Mustangs	16	16	0	1.000	202	83	—
2	Detroit Waza	15	10	5	.667	130	107	5.5
3	Cleveland Freeze	16	10	6	.625	173	134	6.0
4	Cincinnati Saints	16	5	11	.313	108	141	11.0
5	Harrisburg Heat	16	4	12	.250	94	156	12.0
6	Illinois Piasa	15	2	13	.133	62	145	13.5
Central Division
1	Hidalgo La Fiera	16	14	2	.875	185	65	—
2	Dallas Sidekicks	16	14	2	.875	150	68	—
3	Monterrey Flash	16	13	3	.813	140	76	1.0
4	Wichita B-52s	16	7	9	.438	91	113	7.0
5	Saltillo Rancho Seco	16	6	10	.375	91	132	8.0
6	Tulsa Revolution	16	2	14	.125	89	158	12.0
7	Texas Strikers	16	1	15	.063	62	195	13.0
Pacific Division
1	Las Vegas Legends	16	13	3	.813	180	101	—
2	San Diego Sockers	16	13	3	.813	138	83	—
3	Toros Mexico	16	9	7	.563	175	118	4.0
4	Bay Area Rosal	16	7	9	.438	112	158	6.0
5	Turlock Express	16	5	11	.313	93	120	8.0
6	Ontario Fury	16	5	11	.313	116	151	8.0
7	Sacramento Surge	16	3	13	.188	92	179	10.0

== 2014 Ron Newman Cup ==
=== Playoff format ===
On December 24, The PASL selected San Diego, Dallas, Ontario, and Chicago as possible sites for the 2014 Ron Newman Cup Final Four. The sites were initially determined based on several factors including venue availability and suitability. The potential hosts were evaluated based on attendance, accessibility and the teams' competitive history. On January 22, the PASL announced that Chicago would host the PASL Final Four tournament at the Sears Centre while the amateur Premier Arena Soccer League will hold its championship at the Grand Sports Arena, the Mustangs' usual home field this season.

The top three teams in each division will qualify for the Newman Cup Playoffs. In the host team's division, the three top teams other than the host will qualify, creating a total field of 10 playoff teams. As host, Chicago gets an automatic bye past the playoffs and directly to the Final Four tournament.

In each division the division winner (or next best team other than the host), will get a first round bye. The #3 seed will play at #2 and the winner of that game will play at the #1 seed. The three divisional playoff winners will join the host team in the Final Four. All rounds of the playoffs will be single elimination.

The PASL named the Newman Cup Most Valuable Player award the Aaron Susi Trophy, after the California Cougars/San Diego Sockers player who was a member of the league's first five championship teams.

=== Eastern Division Bracket ===
Semifinals; Mar. 1 - 7:05pm			Final; Mar. 8 - 7:05pm
			E2	Detroit Waza	5
E3	Cleveland Freeze	11	E3	Cleveland Freeze	6
E4	Cincinnati Saints	6

=== Central Division Bracket ===
Semifinals; Feb. 22 - 7:05pm			Final; Mar. 1 - 7:05pm
			C1	Hidalgo La Fiera	9
C2	Dallas Sidekicks	4	C3	Monterrey Flash	8
C3	Monterrey Flash	6

=== Pacific Division Bracket ===
Semifinals; Feb. 22 - 7:05pm			Final; Mar. 1 - 7:05pm
			P1	Las Vegas Legends	11
P2	San Diego Sockers	7	P2	San Diego Sockers	7
P3	Toros Mexico	4

=== PASL Final 4 Bracket ===
(@ Chicago, IL)

Semifinals; March 15 - 5:00pm, 7:30pm
C1	Hidalgo La Fiera	5
P1	Las Vegas Legends	4
E1	Chicago Mustangs	10
E3	Cleveland Freeze	3

Final; March 16 - 4:30pm
C1	Hidalgo La Fiera	5
E1	Chicago Mustangs	14

=== Schedule ===
Divisional First Round

February 22, 2014
7:05 PM CST

Dallas Sidekicks	4 - 6	Monterrey Flash
	Report

Allen Event Center
Allen, Texas
Attendance: 4,849
February 22, 2014
7:05 PM PST

San Diego Sockers	7 - 4	Toros Mexico
	Report

Valley View Casino Center
San Diego, California
Attendance: 4,116
March 1, 2014
7:05 PM EST

Cleveland Freeze	11 - 6	Cincinnati Saints
	Report

Soccer Sportsplex
North Olmsted, Ohio
Attendance: 471

Divisional Finals

March 1, 2014
7:05 PM CST

Hidalgo La Fiera	9 - 8	Monterrey Flash
	Report

State Farm Arena
Hidalgo, Texas
Attendance: 1,322
March 1, 2014
7:05 PM PST

Las Vegas Legends	11 - 7	San Diego Sockers
	Report

Las Vegas Sports Park
Las Vegas, Nevada
Attendance: 711
March 8, 2014
7:05 PM EST

Detroit Waza	5 - 6	Cleveland Freeze
	Report

Melvindale Ice Arena
Melvindale, Michigan
Attendance: 1,007

Newman Cup Semi-Finals

March 15, 2014
5:00 PM CDT

Hidalgo La Fiera	5 - 4	Las Vegas Legends
	Report

Sears Centre
Hoffman Estates, Illinois
Attendance: 1,607
March 15, 2014
7:30 PM CDT

Chicago Mustangs	10 - 3	Cleveland Freeze
	Report

Sears Centre
Hoffman Estates, Illinois
Attendance: 3,863

Newman Cup Third Place

March 16, 2014
2:30 PM CDT

Las Vegas Legends	7 - 6	Cleveland Freeze
	Report

Sears Centre
Hoffman Estates, Illinois
Attendance: 1,763

Newman Cup Championship

March 16, 2014
4:30 PM CDT

Chicago Mustangs	14 - 5	Hidalgo La Fiera
	Report; Report

Sears Centre
Hoffman Estates, Illinois
Attendance: 3,969

== Statistics ==
=== Top scorers ===
Rank	Scorer	Club	Games	Goals	Assists	Points
1	(Mexico) Efrain Martinez	Chicago Mustangs	16	40	23	63
2	(United States) Allen Eller	Cleveland Freeze	14	28	34	62
2	(United States) Enrique Tovar	Las Vegas Legends	16	22	40	62
4	(United States) Kraig Chiles	San Diego Sockers	16	38	22	60
5	(Ecuador) Bryan Moya	Chicago Mustangs	16	40	15	55
6	(Mexico) Miguel Vaca	Chicago Mustangs	16	35	19	54
7	(United States) Ivan Campos	Las Vegas Legends	16	28	25	53
8	(United States) Nestor Hernandez	Dallas Sidekicks	15	33	16	49
8	(Chile) Carlos Farias	Hidalgo La Fiera	15	16	33	49
10	(England) Jamie Lovegrove	Dallas Sidekicks	16	26	22	48

Last updated on February 22, 2014. Source: "Scoring Leaders". Professional Arena Soccer League.

== Awards ==
=== Player of the Week ===
Week	Date	Player	Pos.	Team
1	November 5, 2013	Enrique Tovar	FW	Las Vegas Legends
2	November 12, 2013	Efrain Martinez	FW	Chicago Mustangs
3	November 19, 2013	Erick Tovar	FW	Monterrey Flash
4	November 26, 2013	Ivan Campos	FW	Las Vegas Legends
5	December 3, 2013	Miki Djerisilo	MF	Detroit Waza
6	December 10, 2013	Miguel Vaca	MF	Chicago Mustangs
7	December 17, 2013	Kraig Chiles	FW	San Diego Sockers
8	December 24, 2013	Tom Mellor	FW	Harrisburg Heat
9	December 31, 2013	Jesus Flores	GK	Chicago Mustangs
10	January 7, 2014	Brian Farber	MF	San Diego Sockers
11	January 14, 2014	Stefan Ostergren	MF	Cleveland Freeze
12	January 21, 2014	Bryan Moya	FW	Chicago Mustangs
13	January 28, 2014	Kraig Chiles	FW	San Diego Sockers
14	February 4, 2014	Sagu	GK	Dallas Sidekicks
15	February 11, 2014	Josh Grossman; Allen Eller	DF; FW	Cleveland Freeze
16	February 18, 2014	Joey Kapinos	GK	Detroit Waza

=== Individual awards ===
Award	Name	Team
League MVP	Efrain Martinez	Chicago Mustangs
Coach of the Year	Armando Gamboa	Chicago Mustangs
Aaron Susi Trophy (Playoff MVP)	Jesus Flores	Chicago Mustangs

=== All-League First Team ===
Name	Position	Team
Kraig Chiles	F	San Diego Sockers
Efrain Martinez	F	Chicago Mustangs
Enrique Tovar	M	Las Vegas Legends
Alex Caceres	D	Las Vegas Legends
Genoni Martinez	D	Monterrey Flash
Juan Gamboa	GK	Hidalgo La Fiera

=== All-League Second Team ===
Name	Position	Team
Allen Eller	F	Cleveland Freeze
Jamie Lovegrove	M	Dallas Sidekicks
Miguel Vaca	M	Chicago Mustangs
Costea Decu	D	Detroit Waza
Josh Grossman	D	Cleveland Freeze
Jesus Flores	GK	Chicago Mustangs

=== Honorable Mention ===
Name	Position	Team
Ivan Campos	F	Las Vegas Legends
Nestor Hernandez	M	Dallas Sidekicks
Evan McNeley	D	San Diego Sockers
Bryan Moya	F	Chicago Mustangs
Omar Santillan	D	Chicago Mustangs
Chris Toth	GK	San Diego Sockers
