= Brian Farber =

American soccer player

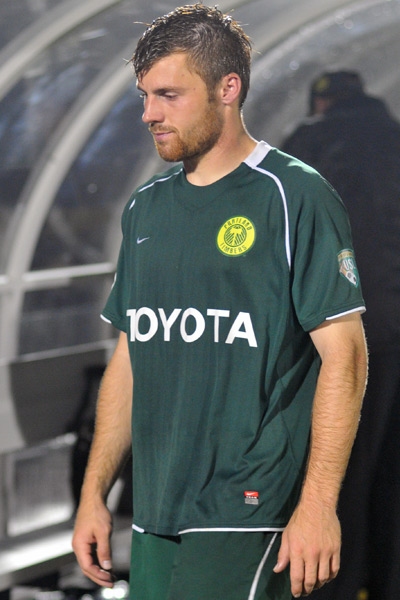

Personal information
- Full name: Brian Farber
- Date of birth: April 15, 1982 (age 44)
- Place of birth: Sandpoint, Idaho, United States
- Height: 5 ft 8 in (1.73 m)
- Position: Midfielder

Team information
- Current team: San Diego Sockers
- Number: 7

College career
Years	Team	Apps	(Gls)
2000–2001	North Idaho Cardinals		
2002–2003	Oregon State Beavers		

Senior career*
Years	Team	Apps	(Gls)
2005–2010	California Cougars (indoor)	105	(103)
2007	Minnesota Thunder	28	(7)
2009–2010	Portland Timbers	36	(3)
2011	Carolina RailHawks	19	(2)
2011–	San Diego Sockers (indoor)	150	(142)
2012	Los Angeles Blues	20	(2)

International career
- United States arena soccer
- * Club domestic league appearances and goals as of November 27, 2024

Brian Farber (born April 15, 1982, in Sandpoint, Idaho) is an American soccer player who played as a midfielder for the San Diego Sockers of the Major Arena Soccer League.

== Career ==
=== College ===
Farber won the Idaho State Soccer Player of the Year award in 2000 before playing college soccer at North Idaho College, where he remains the school's career record-holder for points. He transferred to Oregon State University for his final two collegiate seasons. Farber was named to the All-Pac-10 second team and Pac-10 All-Academic team as a senior in 2004.

=== Professional ===
Farber's career started in indoor soccer, having played with the Stockton Cougars and its predecessor, the California Cougars, in the Major Indoor Soccer League and the Professional Arena Soccer League since 2005. He is the franchise record holder for goals (110), points (175), and games played (105) for the Cougars franchise. He also had 55 assists. He earned MVP of the PASL in 2008.

After playing several games in the MLS Reserve Division with the reserve teams of both San Jose Earthquakes and Houston Dynamo between 2004 and 2006, Farber was offer a contract from Houston Dynamo. His rights were not released from his indoor team. Farber's outdoor career then went in 2007 to the Minnesota Thunder Minnesota Thunder of the USL First Division. Farber played 28 matches for Thunder, finished the season as the team's leading scorer with seven goals and leader in assists with four, and was named to the USL First Division All-League second team. He led the team in minutes played as well.

Farber signed with the Portland Timbers in January 2009. His first year with the Timbers he scored 14 points with 5 goals and 4 assists, and adding 1 goal and 3 assists in the Lamar Hunt U.S. Open Cup helping the Timbers to the Quarter Finals. Farber scored the first goal of the campaign for the Portland Timbers in his first appearance in 2008.

On March 7, 2011, Farber signed with Carolina RailHawks of the North American Soccer League. He then moved to the San Diego Sockers of the Professional Arena Soccer League. Injuries limited him to only four games in his first season with the Sockers. However, during the 2011–12 season, he scored twenty-seven goals in sixteen games. He is a key member of the Sockers during their 2012–13 and 2013–14 seasons as well. The PASL named Farber its Player of the Week on January 7, 2014. Farber retired from the San Diego Sockers after the opening game of the 2023-2024 Season in a dominant win vs. the Tacoma Stars.

== Honors ==
Portland Timbers

- USL First Division Commissioner's Cup: 2009
