= Bay Area Rosal =

- Founded: 2013
- Ground: Cabernet Indoor Sports; 6474 Patterson Pass Rd. Livermore, California 94550
- Owner: Chris Rockenbaugh
- Head Coach: Luis Orellana
- League: Professional Arena Soccer League
- Website: http://rosalprosoccer.com

The Bay Area Rosal was an American professional indoor soccer team based in Livermore, California. Founded in 1998 as an amateur club, the team made its professional debut in the Professional Arena Soccer League at the start of the 2013–14 season. The team plays its home games at Cabernet Indoor Sports under the leadership of owner Chris Rockenbaugh and, as of late December 2013, new head coach Luis Orellana.

== History ==
The Rosal were founded in 1998 as an amateur club. The team (then known as Bladium Rosal) won the 2012–13 Premier Arena Soccer League championship before moving up to the professional league in 2013.

== Year-by-year ==
League champions	Runners-up	Division champions*	Playoff berth

Year	League	Reg. season	GF	GA	Pct	Finish	Playoffs	Avg. attendance
2013–14	PASL	7-9	112	158	.438	4th, Pacific	Did not qualify	350

The team began its inaugural campaign with a pre-season match against the Turlock Express on October 26. The Rosal lost 6–7. They lost their first PASL regular season match 7–12 to the Las Vegas Legends and lost again to Turlock before winning 5 of their next 7 matches to close out 2013. 2014, however, started with four consecutive losses. The team finished the regular season with a 7–9 record. The team did not advance to the post-season but did perform well in the 2013–14 United States Open Cup for Arena Soccer, winning their way to the Quarterfinals before falling to the Las Vegas Legends.
