= Allen Eller =

American soccer player

- Eller in 2010

Personal information
- Date of birth: December 11, 1976
- Place of birth: Cleveland, Ohio, U.S.
- Date of death: November 4, 2016 (aged 39)
- Place of death: Wickliffe, Ohio, U.S.
- Height: 5 ft 9 in (1.75 m)
- Positions: Forward; midfielder

College career
Years	Team	Apps	(Gls)
1995–1998	Akron Zips		

Senior career*
Years	Team	Apps	(Gls)
1999–2000	Pittsburgh Riverhounds	37	(1)
1999–2000	Cleveland Crunch (indoor)	15	(2)
2002	Harrisburg Heat (indoor)	14	(8)
2003	Cincinnati Riverhawks	24	(6)
2003–2005	Baltimore Blast (indoor)	68	(20)
2005	Cleveland Force (indoor)	8	(5)
2006	Cleveland Internationals	6	(1)
2006	North Coast Soccer (indoor)		
2009–2011	Ohio Vortex (indoor)	22	(54)
2011–2012	Cincinnati Kings (indoor)	15	(22)
2013–2014	Cleveland Freeze (indoor)	18	(34)
- * Club domestic league appearances and goals

Allen Eller (December 11, 1976 – November 4, 2016) was an American soccer player who played as a forward and midfielder.

== Biography ==
Eller attended the University of Akron, playing on the men's soccer team from 1995 to 1998. In 1999, Eller turned professional with the Pittsburgh Riverhounds of the USL A-League. In the fall, Eller moved indoors with the Cleveland Crunch of the National Professional Soccer League. In 2001, Eller did not play the outdoor season, but in February 2002, he signed with the Harrisburg Heat for the second Major Indoor Soccer League. He finished the season with the Heat. On January 31, 2003, the Heat traded Kyle Swords and Eller to the Baltimore Blast for Gino DiFlorio. The Blast won the 2003 and 2004 league titles. On March 29, 2005, the Blast traded Eller and Neil Gilbert to the Cleveland Force for Joel Bailey and Sipho Sibiya. The Force lost to the Milwaukee Wave in the championship series that season. During this time, Eller also spent the 2003 outdoor season with the Cincinnati Riverhawks. In 2006, he briefly played for the Cleveland Internationals of the Premier Development League. In 2008, Eller joined North Coast Soccer of the Premier Arena Soccer League. November 12, 2009 he signed with the Ohio Vortex. In November 2011, Eller moved to the Cincinnati Kings for one season. He has played regularly with Croatia Cleveland Soccer Club, from its juniors program to its men's team in the Lake Erie Soccer League, having won several titles throughout the years.

Eller died aged 39.
