= 2012 FIFRA Club Championship =

Indoor soccer tournament

The 2012 FIFRA Club Championship is an indoor soccer tournament that included teams from four countries and four professional leagues. Teams from United States, Canada, Mexico and Ecuador compete for FIFRA Club Championship.

== Standings ==
Blue indicates 2012 FIFRA Club Championship winner
Green indicates second place of 2012 FIFRA Club Championship
Orange indicates third place of 2012 FIFRA Club Championship

Team	GP	W	L	T	GF	GA	Pts
(United States) San Diego Sockers	3	3	0	0	28	7	9
(Mexico) Monterrey Flash	3	2	1	0	13	1	6
(Ecuador) La Bombonerita	3	1	2	0	8	12	3
(Canada) Sherbrooke Vert et Or	3	0	3	0	1	24	0

== Games (All in Monterrey, Mexico) ==
=== First round ===
- 2/2 - La Bombonerita 4, Sherbrooke Vert et Or 0
- 2/2 - San Diego Sockers 5, Flash de Monterrey 4
- 2/3 - San Diego Sockers 15, Sherbrooke Vert et Or 0
- 2/3 - Flash de Monterrey 4, La Bombonerita 1
- 2/4 - San Diego Sockers 8, La Bombonerita 3
- 2/4 - Flash de Monterrey 5, Sherbrooke Vert et Or 1

=== 3rd-place game ===
- 2/5 - La Bombonerita 7, Sherbrooke Vert et Or 6

=== Championship ===
- 2/5 - San Diego Sockers 5, Flash de Monterrey 3
