= San Diego Sockers (2001–2004) =

Major Indoor Soccer League Team

- Founded: 2001
- Dissolved: 2004
- Stadium: San Diego Sports Arena
- Owner: David Altomare
- Head Coach: Brian Quinn
- League: WISL (2001); MISL II (2002–2004)

The San Diego Sockers were a professional indoor soccer team based in San Diego, California, that competed in the World Indoor Soccer League and Major Indoor Soccer League.

The team began play in the WISL in 2001. This was also the team's most successful year; they had the best regular season record in the WISL, although they lost to the Dallas Sidekicks in the WISL championship playoff.. The WISL merged into the MISL beginning with the 2002–2003 season, and the Sockers played in the MISL for the next three seasons.

Ahead of the 2004–2005 season, a majority share in the team was sold to Raj Kalra, the owner of the Vancouver Ravens of the National Lacrosse League. The sale was unanimously approved by the MISL in October 2004 and Kalra stated that he was "certain we're going to make money". However, by December, Kalra had not paid the Sockers' players, employees, or vendors, including schools that participated in a ticket rebate program with the team. and the league voted to discontinue the franchise mid-season, on December 30, 2004.

A new team using the Sockers' name and logo joined the PASL-PRO in the 2009–10 season.

== Honors ==
- WISL Regular Season champion (2001)

=== Year-by-year ===
Year	League	Reg. season	Playoffs	Attendance
2001	WISL	1st WISL, 14–10	Lost Championship	4,029
2002–03	MISL	3rd West, 14–22	Lost Division Semifinal	4,248
2003–04	MISL	2nd West, 13–23	Failed to Qualify	4,212
2004–05	MISL	8th MISL, 4–6	Folded at midseason	3,938

== Head coaches ==
- Brian Quinn 2001–2004

== Arenas ==
- San Diego Sports Arena 2001–2004
