= San Diego Sockers (2009) =

Major Arena Soccer League team in San Diego, California

- Founded: 2009; 17 years ago
- Stadium: Frontwave Arena
- Capacity: 5,500
- Owner: David Pike, Carl Savoia
- General Manager: Sean Bowers
- Head Coach: Phil Salvagio
- League: MASL
- 2022–23: 1st, Western Division; Playoffs: MASL semifinals
- Website: sdsockers.com
Home colors

The San Diego Sockers are an American professional indoor soccer team based in San Diego County, California, that competes in the Major Arena Soccer League (MASL). The team plays its home games at Frontwave Arena. The Sockers began play in the 2009–2010 season.

== History ==
=== 1978–1996 ===
The original San Diego Sockers began as the Baltimore Comets in 1974 but moved to San Diego as the San Diego Jaws in 1976. After a one-year stay in Las Vegas as the Las Vegas Quicksilvers, the team returned as the San Diego Sockers in 1978. They were owned by Bob Bell and played their indoor games at the San Diego Sports Arena.

Initially, victories came slowly for the club but mounted quickly and they experienced moderate success over their outdoor history winning several division titles. However, the San Diego Sockers won the North American Soccer League (NASL) Indoor Championships of 1981–82 and 1983–84. Success was far from over for the San Diego Sockers. When the NASL folded, the San Diego Sockers moved to the Major Indoor Soccer League and won eight championships: 1983, 1985, 1986, 1988, 1989, 1990, 1991, and 1992. The Sockers carried their success from one league to the next. They switched to the Continental Indoor Soccer League for three more years from 1993 to 1995. However, after several ownership changes, Sockers folded after the 1996 season.

=== 2001–2004 ===
The second version of the San Diego Sockers were a team in the new Major Indoor Soccer League. The team began play in the World Indoor Soccer League in 2001, and joined the MISL when it merged with the WISL for the 2002–2003 season. Just before the beginning of the 2004–2005 season, the Sockers were sold to Raj Kalra, owner of the Vancouver Ravens of the National Lacrosse League. However, barely two months after the purchase, it was revealed that Kalra had not paid the Sockers' players, staff, or rent since taking over, and the league voted to discontinue the franchise on December 30, 2004.

=== 2009–present ===
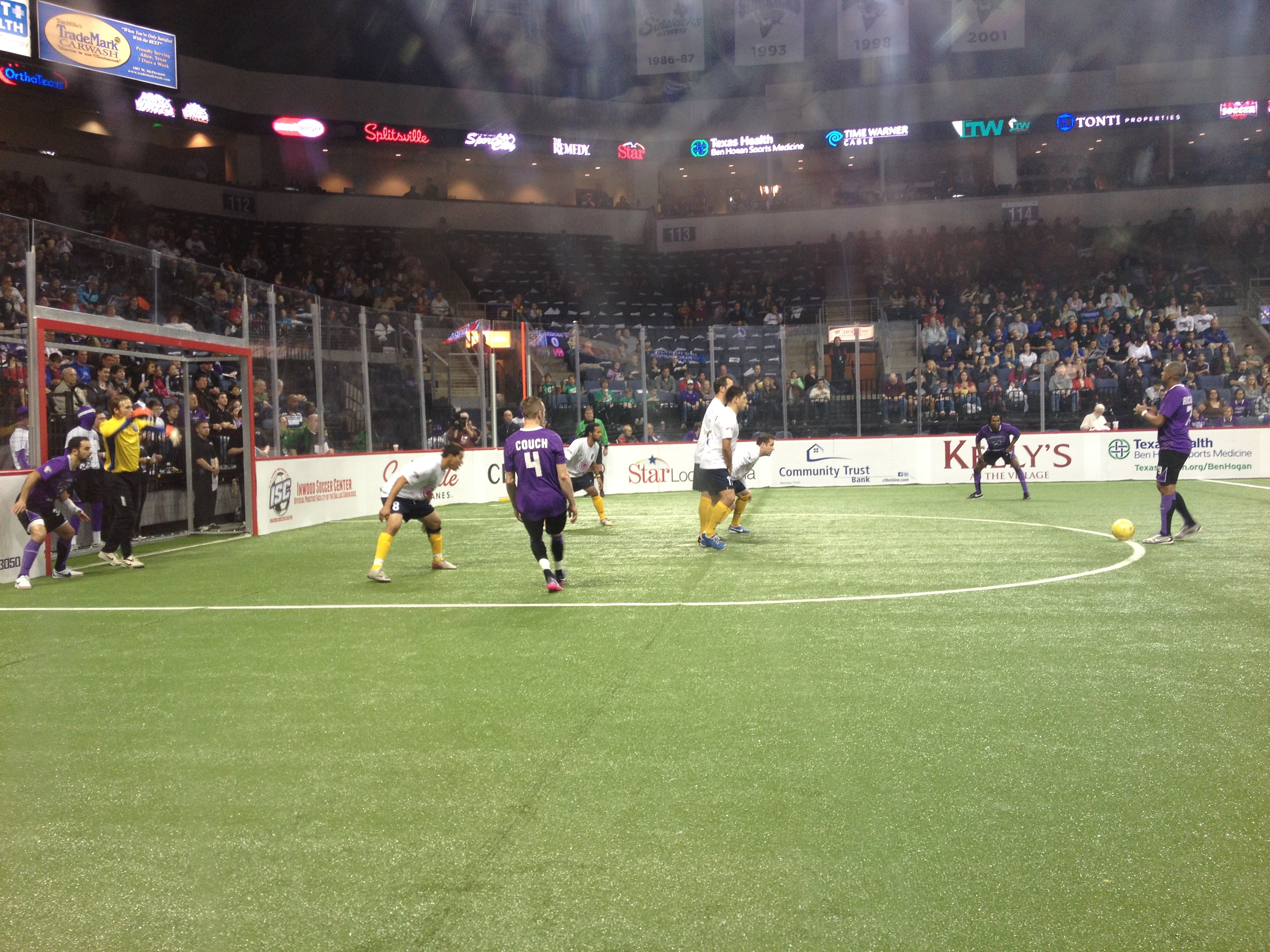
San Diego Sockers v Dallas Sidekicks in 2013

The current Sockers franchise were founded in 2009 by David Pike, Carl Savoia and Phil Salvagio. This was the second attempt to revive the Sockers name. The current Sockers team have enjoyed a significant amount of success since they began play having won both the PASL-Pro championship and US Open Cup of Arena Soccer in their first four seasons. The Sockers hold the record for the longest winning streak in United States professional soccer history. The streak, which began on December 29, 2010, was snapped after 48 games by a 6–5 overtime road loss to the Dallas Sidekicks on January 27, 2013.

In January 2019, former USMNT player Landon Donovan joined the Sockers in the Major Arena Soccer League. The team during the 22/23 season held a record of 22–2–0 in the regular season. They went on to play three games for the Ron Newman Cup Conference Finals where they lost the championship, 1–0 to Chihuahua Savage in overtime. It was documented that "Over the past two seasons, the Sockers have compiled a 45–2–1 regular season record." Starting in the 2024 season, the San Diego Sockers will move to Oceanside to play at Frontwave Arena. This is where all of their 12 home games will be hosted.

== Colors and badge ==
At their inception the Sockers featured a color scheme primarily consisting of the royal blue, white, and yellow colors often used by the previous Sockers teams and utilized a modified version of their immediate predecessor's logo. For the 2011 season the team modified their uniforms dropping the yellow in favor of a smaller amount of gold. Their logo also changed to a new shield logo that corresponded to their new uniforms that utilized the 1978 founding date of the original Sockers franchise which the team claims ties to as well as stars representing the 14 titles won by the combined Sockers franchises.

== Arena ==
The Sockers have represented the San Diego area since 2009. The Sockers first played home games at Chevrolet Del Mar Arena at the Del Mar Fairgrounds adjacent to the Del Mar Racetrack in Del Mar, California. They moved to Pechanga Arena, the original home of the MISL Sockers, for the 2012–2013 season. The Sockers moved to Frontwave Arena, a 7,500 seat multi-purpose indoor sports arena in Oceanside, in 2024.

- Chevrolet Del Mar Arena (2009–2012)
- Pechanga Arena (2012–2024)
- Frontwave Arena (2024–present)

== Personnel ==
As of January 21, 2022.

=== Active players ===
Note: Flags indicate national team as defined under FIFA eligibility rules; some limited exceptions apply. Players may hold more than one non-FIFA nationality.

| No. | Pos. | Nation | Player |
|---|---|---|---|
| 0 | GK | USA | Xavier Snear-Williams |
| 2 | DF | MEX | Juan Manuel Rojo |
| 4 | MF | MEX | Christian Gutierrez |
| 5 | DF | MEX | Guerrero Pino |
| 6 | MF | USA | Felipe Gonzalez |
| 7 | MF | USA | Brian Farber |
| 8 | DF | BRA | Ze Roberto |
| 9 | FW | JAM | Tavoy Morgan |
| 11 | FW | BRA | Leonardo De Oliveira |
| 16 | FW | MEX | Eduardo Velez |
| 17 | MF | USA | Raymundo Reza |
| 18 | DF | USA | Sean Callahan |

| No. | Pos. | Nation | Player |
|---|---|---|---|
| 19 | MF | MEX | Brandon Escoto |
| 20 | DF | MEX | Ismael Rojo |
| 21 | MF | USA | Charlie Gonzalez |
| 23 | DF | USA | Andy Reyes |
| 27 | GK | USA | Boris Pardo |
| 29 | DF | MEX | Cesar Cerda |
| 31 | DF | USA | Mitchell Cardenas |
| 37 | FW | USA | Kraig Chiles (Captain) |
| 63 | MF | USA | Edward Willette |
| 69 | DF | USA | Luis Ortega |
| 77 | DF | USA | Juan Gonzalez |
| 97 | MF | MEX | Gerardo Jurado |

=== Inactive players ===
Note: Flags indicate national team as defined under FIFA eligibility rules; some limited exceptions apply. Players may hold more than one non-FIFA nationality.

| No. | Pos. | Nation | Player |
|---|---|---|---|
| 58 | FW | USA | Cesar Romero |

== Staff ==
As of January 21, 2022.

- Head coach: Phil Salvagio (2009–present)
- Assistant coach: Rene Ortiz
- Assistant coach: Chiky Luna
- Goalkeeper coach: Victor Melendez
- Athletic Trainer: Paul Savage
- General Manager: Sean Bowers (2016–present)
- Owners: David Pike and Carl Savoia (2009–present)

== Honors ==
- 2009–10, 2010–11 PASL-PRO Western Division champions
- 2011–12 PASL Western Division champions
- 2012–13 PASL Pacific Division champions
- 2014–15 MASL Pacific Division regular-season champions
- 2016–17, 2017–18, 2018–19 MASL Pacific Division champions
- 2021–22 MASL West Division champions
- 2009–10, 2010–11 PASL-PRO Champions
- 2011–12, 2012–13 PASL Champions
- 2021-22, 2022-23, 2025-26 MASL Shield
- 2021, 2022, 2026 MASL Ron Newman Cup Champions
- 2009–10, 2010–11, 2011–12 U.S. Open Cup of Arena Soccer Champions
- 2012 FIFRA Club Champions

== Year-by-year ==
| League champions | Runners-up | Division champions | Playoff berth |

| Season | League | Won | Lost | GF | GA | Finish | Playoff | Avg. attendance | U.S. Open Cup | Other |
|---|---|---|---|---|---|---|---|---|---|---|
| 2009–10 | PASL-Pro | 13 | 3 | 146 | 91 | 1st, Western | Champions | 1,705 | 2009–10 Champions | |
| 2010–11 | PASL-Pro | 14 | 2 | 136 | 79 | 1st, Western | Champions | 2,608 | 2010–11 Champions | |
| 2011–12 | PASL | 16 | 0 | 165 | 78 | 1st, Western | Champions | 2,197 | 2011–12 Champions | FIFRA Club Champions |
| 2012–13 | PASL | 15 | 1 | 188 | 71 | 1st, Pacific | Champions | 3,744 | 2012–13 Runners-up | |
| 2013–14 | PASL | 13 | 3 | 141 | 83 | 2nd, Pacific | Divisional Final | 3,625 | Round of 16 | |
| 2014–15 | MASL | 16 | 4 | 179 | 99 | 1st, Pacific | Divisional Final | 2,881 | | |
| 2015–16 | MASL | 13 | 7 | 138 | 111 | 2nd, Pacific | Divisional Final | 3,051 | | |
| 2016–17 | MASL | 14 | 6 | 149 | 90 | 1st, Pacific | Conference Final | 3,844 | | |
| 2017–18 | MASL | 19 | 3 | 166 | 84 | 1st, Pacific | Conference Final | 3,284 | | |
| 2018–19 | MASL | 23 | 1 | 185 | 92 | 1st, Pacific | Conference Final | 4,181 | | |
| 2019–20 | MASL | 15 | 6 | 124 | 104 | 2nd, Western | No playoffs | 2,746 | | |
| 2021 | MASL | 4 | 6 | 41 | 43 | 5th, MASL | Champions | NHG* | | |
| 2021–22 | MASL | 23 | 1 | 182 | 98 | 1st, West | Champions | 1,352 | | |
| 2022–23 | MASL | 22 | 2 | 160 | 99 | 1st, West | Conference Final | 1,606 | | |
| 2023–24 | MASL | 18 | 6 | 171 | 127 | 1st, West | Conference Final | 1,587 | | |
| 2024–25 | MASL | 20 | 4 | 152 | 119 | 2nd, MASL | Runners-up | 3,372 | | |
| 2025–26 | MASL | 16 | 8 | 149 | 121 | 1st, MASL | Champions | 3,579 | | |
| Total | 14 Seasons | 214 | 51 | 2089 | 1244 | | | | | |

* The Sockers had no home games due to the COVID-19 pandemic.

== Playoff record ==
| Year | Win | Loss | GF | GA | Avg. attendance |
|---|---|---|---|---|---|
| 2009–10 | 2 | 0 | 15 | 13 | |
| 2010–11 | 2 | 0 | 17 | 9 | |
| 2011–12 | 2 | 0 | 19 | 13 | 2,390 |
| 2012–13 | 4 | 0 | 39 | 26 | 3,557 |
| 2013–14 | 1 | 1 | 14 | 15 | 4,116 |
| 2014–15 | 0 | 1 | 6 | 7 | 4,279 |
| 2015–16 | 3 | 2 | 37 | 36 | 2,497 |
| 2016–17 | 2 | 3 | 27 | 30 | 5,048 |
| 2017–18 | 2 | 2 | 21 | 16 | 3,421 |
| 2018–19 | 2 | 1 | 16 | 13 | 3,607 |
| 2021 | 6 | 1 | 35 | 27 | NHG* |
| 2021–22 | 6 | 1 | 44 | 21 | 1,535 |
| Total | 32 | 12 | 290 | 226 | 3,186 |

* The Sockers had no home games due to the COVID-19 pandemic.
