= Real Phoenix FC =

American soccer club

Real Phoenix Football Club
- Full name: Real Phoenix Football Club
- Short name: Real Phoenix
- Founded: 2012
- Ground: American Sports Center; Avondale, Arizona
- Capacity: 2,500
- Owners: Real Phoenix Football Club LLC
- CEO: Rosario Lopez Jr.
- Head Coach: Rosario Lopez (2012)
- League: Major League Futsal USA
Home colors	Away colors

Real Phoenix Football Club is an American soccer club based in Phoenix, Arizona. The franchise launched in 2012 and consisted of several different teams including the Professional Indoor Team in the Professional Arena Soccer League, the reserve team in the Premier Arena Soccer League and the Professional Futsal Team. They concluded operations in 2014 and re-launched in 2015 joining Major League Futsal USA, and the Southwest Premier League NISA, NISA Nation in 2022. In 2022 Real Phoenix Futsal committed to the Division of Honor of Major League Futsal USA.

Real Phoenix Football Club also provides a strong Youth Soccer and Futsal Academy as members of the Major League Futsal Youth Academy and United Premier Soccer League Academy programs.

The team colors are Black and Gold. Their Mottos are "Ordo Ab Chao (Order out of Chaos)" and "Virtus Junxit Mors Non Separabit (Whom virtue unites, death will not separate)".

== History ==
On June 6, 2012, Real Phoenix FC was created by Rosario Lopez and his family. Originally based at the Barney Family Sports Complex in Queen Creek, Arizona, the team began playing the final two home games of the 2012–13 season at the Arizona Sports Complex in Glendale, Arizona.

Their Futsal team made its debut at the 2012 United States Futsal Federation National Championships, July 13 – 15 at the Anaheim Convention Center. They won one game and lost three.

On August 15, 2012, the team was awarded a franchise in the Professional Arena Soccer League. Their reserve team will play in the Premier Arena Soccer League.

Real Phoenix defeated an all-star team from Mexico 7–6 in their arena soccer debut on October 20, 2012. The team left the PASL after the 2012–13 season.
