= Kraig Chiles =

American soccer player

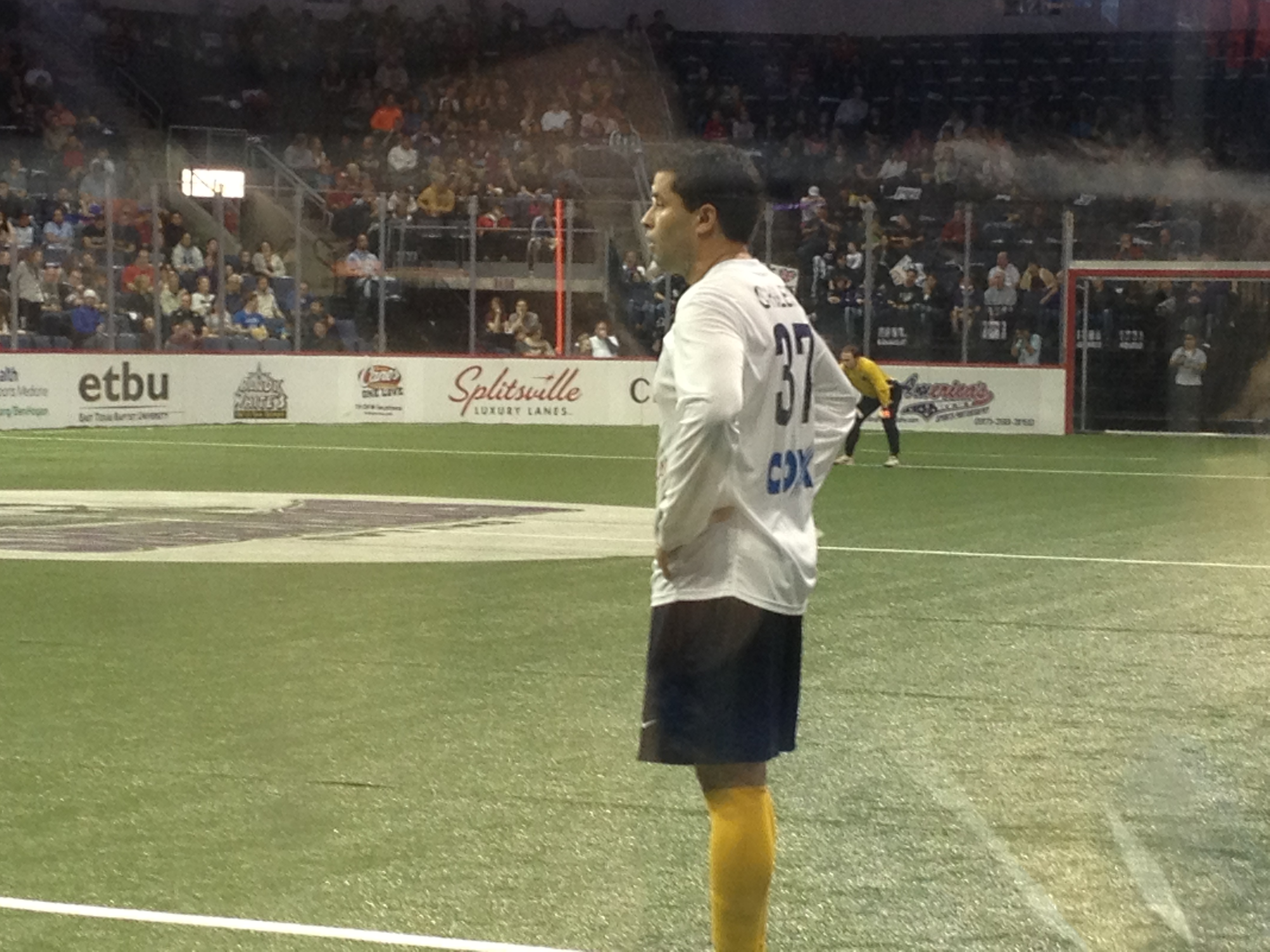
- Chiles during the San Diego Sockers match at the Dallas Sidekicks on January 27, 2013

Personal information
- Full name: Kraig Ryan Chiles
- Date of birth: May 14, 1984 (age 42)
- Place of birth: Torrance, California, United States
- Height: 5 ft 11 in (1.80 m)
- Position: Forward

Team information
- Current team: San Diego Sockers
- Number: 37

College career
Years	Team	Apps	(Gls)
2003–2007	San Diego State Aztecs		

Senior career*
Years	Team	Apps	(Gls)
2008	Chivas USA	5	(0)
2009	Los Angeles Legends	6	(1)
2009–	San Diego Sockers (indoor)	293	(512)

International career
2010–	United States futsal	14	(9)
- * Club domestic league appearances and goals as of November 27, 2024

Kraig Chiles (born May 14, 1984) is an American soccer player who plays for the San Diego Sockers of the Major Arena Soccer League.

== Career ==
=== Youth and college ===
Chiles played high school soccer for Poway High School in Poway, California, and remains one of the school's all-time leading goalscorers. At San Diego State University he was named to the All-Pac-10 team three times, including First Team All-Pac-10 senior year. Kraig scored 21 goals and had 12 assists in his four years with the Aztecs.

=== Professional ===
Chiles was drafted 9th overall by CD Chivas USA in the 2008 MLS Supplemental Draft. He made his MLS debut for Chivas against FC Dallas on 20 April 2008, but was released by the team in February 2009.

Having been unable to secure a professional contract elsewhere, Chiles signed for Los Angeles Legends of the USL Premier Development League in June 2009. He scored on his debut for the Legends on June 19, 2009, in a 5–0 win over Ogden Outlaws.

In 2010 Chiles was signed by the San Diego Sockers. Chiles led the Professional Arena Soccer League's Western Conference with 33 goals, helping the Sockers capture the PASL North American National Championship. Kraig was re-signed for the 2011–12 and 2012–13 seasons. Chiles earned the League MVP honor from the PASL in 2011, 2012, 2013, scoring over 200 goals in his 5-year professional indoor soccer career.

Chiles has also been included in the United States Futsal National team for the last 4 years, earning 14 caps scoring 9 goals.

- 2010, 2011, 2012 and 2013 Professional Arena Soccer League (PASL) National Champions
- 2010, 2011 and 2012 US Open Cup National Champion
- 2010 Second Team All-PASL Pro
- 2011 PASL Player of the Year
- 2011 First Team All-PASL Pro
- 2011 PASL Playoff MVP
- 2011 PASL Golden Boot scoring 33 goals in 14 games
- 2012 PASL Player of the Year
- 2012 First Team All-PASL Pro
- 2012 PASL Golden Boot breaking the single season scoring record with 46 goals in 15 games
- 2013 PASL Player of the Year
- 2013 First Team All-PASL Pro
- 2013 Golden Boot winner breaking a single season record with 56 goals in 16 games
- 2013 PASL Playoff MVP
- 2014 First Team All-PASL Pro
- 2022 MASL Playoff MVP
- 2011-13 US Futsal National Team participating in Futsal Grand Prix in Brazil, Tour of Guatemala, Concacaf World Cup qualifiers in Guatemala, Four Nations Championship in England.
