= Arizona Storm =

- Founded: 2011
- Dissolved: 2013
- Ground: Arizona Sports Complex; Glendale, Arizona
- Capacity: 800
- League: Professional Arena Soccer League
- Website: https://www.facebook.com/ArizonaStormSoccer
Home colors	Away colors

Arizona Storm was a professional indoor soccer team based in Phoenix, Arizona. They played in the Southwestern Division of the Professional Arena Soccer League. Launched in 2011 as the "Phoenix Monsoon" with the Phoenix Sports Centre in Phoenix as their home turf, the team relocated to the Arizona Sports Complex in Glendale for the 2012–13 season. The team folded after the end of that season.

== Year-by-year ==
Season	League	Won	Lost	GF	GA	Regular season	Playoff	Avg. attendance	U.S. Open Cup
2011–12	PASL	1	15	59	148	6th, Western	Did not qualify	215	Round of 16
2012–13	PASL	6	10	102	174	3rd, Southwestern	Did not qualify	129	Wild Card Round

== Arenas ==
- Randall McDaniel Sports Complex, Avondale, Arizona (2011–12)
- Phoenix Sports Centre, Phoenix, Arizona (2011–12)
- Arizona Sports Complex, Glendale, Arizona (2012–13)
