= Anaheim Bolts =

American professional indoor soccer team

- Founded: 2009
- Dissolved: 2013
- Ground: Anaheim Convention Center
- Capacity: 7,500
- Coach: Jeff Tackett
- League: Professional Arena Soccer League
Home colors	Away colors

The Anaheim Bolts were an American professional indoor soccer team founded in 2009. Since March 2011, the team had been a member of the Professional Arena Soccer League. Citing poor attendance and increasing costs, the team suspended operations in June 2013 and will not participate in the 2013–14 PASL season while new owners are sought for the franchise.

== History ==
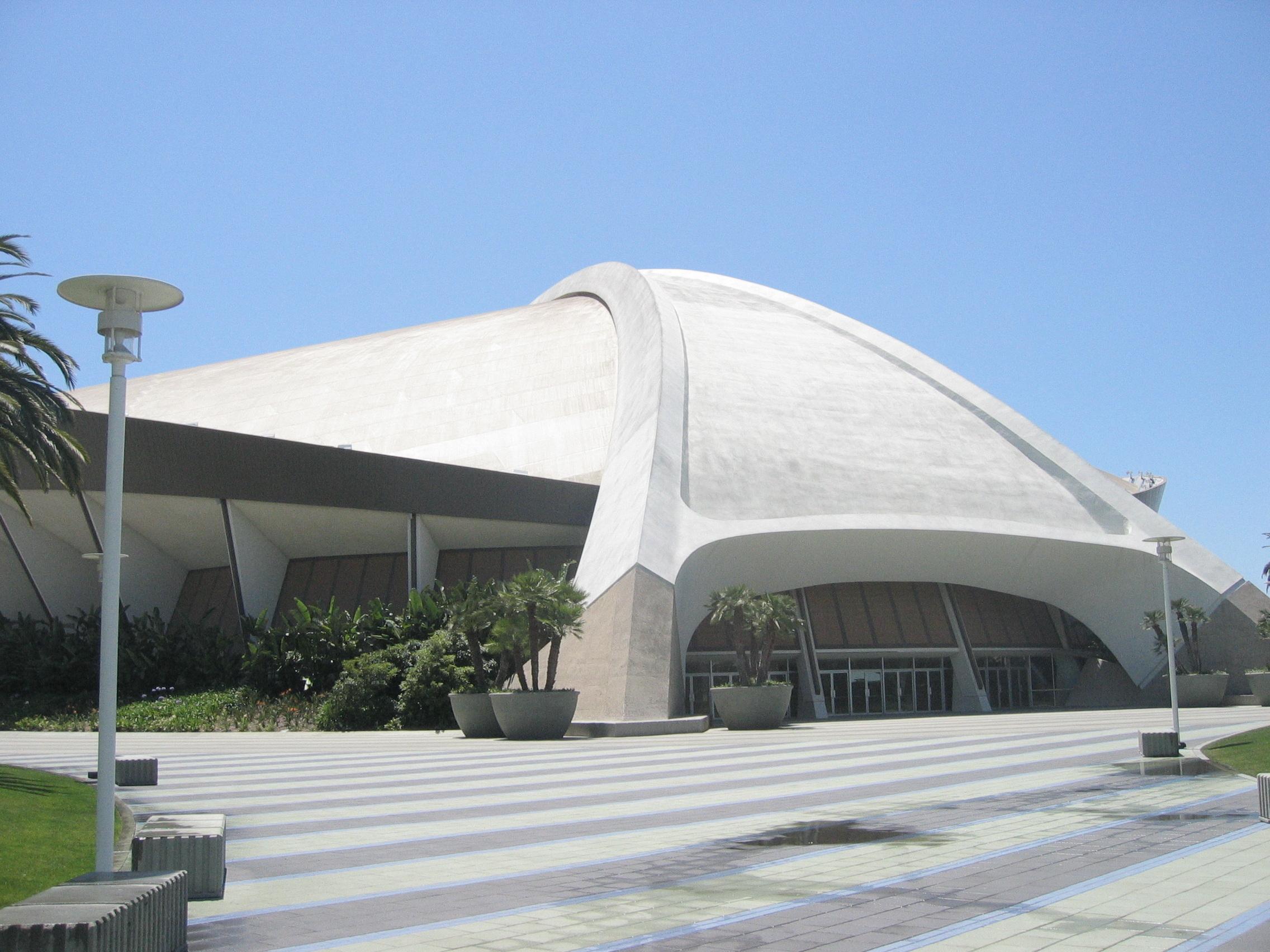
Anaheim Convention Center Arena

Bernie Lilavois, an indoor soccer veteran and former coach of the California Cougars, founded the Los Angeles Bolts as a member of the Premier Arena Soccer League for the 2009–2010 season. On March 7, 2011, the team moved to the Professional Arena Soccer League as the Anaheim Bolts.

On May 28, 2013, Bernie Lilavois returned the franchise to the PASL in order to become President and Head Coach of the new Ontario Fury. The PASL announced that they are looking for new ownership for the Bolts and that they would not play in the 2013–14 season.

== Year-by-year ==
Year	League	Record	GS	GA	Finish	Playoffs	Avg. attendance
2009–10	PASL-Premier	2–5–1	44	71	5th, Southwest	DNQ	-
2010–11	PASL-Premier	3–4–1	46	52	4th, Southwest	DNQ	-
2011–12	PASL	8–8	148	158	4th, Western	DNQ	973
2012–13	PASL	6–10	146	174	4th, Pacific	DNQ	1,035
