= Las Vegas Legends =

- Founded: 2012
- Stadium: Peter Johann Memorial Field
- Capacity: 2,000
- Owner, president: Meir Cohen
- HeadCoach: Asaf Nimni
- League: National Premier Soccer League; NISA Nation
- Website: http://lasvegaslegends.com

The Las Vegas Legends are a semi-professional soccer team based in the Las Vegas metropolitan area. They play in the National Premier Soccer League, a non-professional league in the United States soccer league system.

== History ==
The club was founded in 2012 as an indoor soccer team as a member of the Major Arena Soccer League. During their time in the MASL, the Legends split their home games between the Orleans Arena and the Las Vegas Sports Park. The team's president and general manager is Meir Cohen. The team included a mix of local, regional, and international players. The team did not return after the 2015–16 season.

On September 5, 2019, it was announced that the club would return to competitive play in 2020 as a member of the National Premier Soccer League In 2021 The team finished 1st Place in the Southwest Division. In Fall 2021 the team joined the NISA Nation.

On Jan 12, 2024, NISA promoted Las Vegas Legends to NISA Pro, in what was called "the first-ever intra-system, merit-based promotion to pro in modern U.S. soccer." This would allow the Legends to play in the NISA for the 2025 season, pending USSF approval.

The Las Vegas Legends again finished first in the Southwest Division in 2024 with a perfect 10–0–0 record. However, the team was barred from participating in the 2024 NPSL Playoffs due to not meeting their financial obligations to the league.

Las Vegas Legends U20 plays in the Nevada-Utah Premier League, where they won the 2021 season, as part of the SWPL.

== Year-by-year ==
=== 2012–2016 ===
League champions	Runners-up	Division champions*	Playoff berth

Year	League	Reg. season	GF	GA	Finish	Playoffs	Avg. attendance
2012–13	PASL	13–3	174	81	1st, Southwest	Western Conference Finals	1,165
2013–14	PASL	13–3	180	101	1st, Pacific	Western Conference Finals	699
2014–15	MASL	13–7	171	109	3rd, Pacific	Western Conference Finals	1,480
2015–16	MASL	14–6	141	106	1st, Southwest	Western Conference Finals	501

=== 2021–present ===
Season	League											Position		Playoffs	USOC
Season	League	Conf	Pld	W	L	D	GF	GA	GD	Pts	PPG	Conf.	Overall	Playoffs	USOC
2021	NPSL	Southwest	10	6	2	2	38	28	+10	20	2.00	1st	–	CF	NH
2022	NPSL	Pacific South	10	2	5	3	20	24	−4	9	0.90	3rd	–	DNQ	R2
2023	NPSL	Southwest	10	5	3	2	24	13	+11	17	1.70	3rd	–	DNQ	DNQ
2024	NPSL	Southwest	10	10	0	0	49	11	+38	30	3.00	1st	–	CF	DNQ

== Honors ==
- Professional Arena Soccer League/Major Arena Soccer League
  - Southwest Division Regular Season Champions (2): 2012–13, 2015–16
  - Southwest Division Playoff Champions (2): 2012–13, 2015–16
  - Pacific Division Regular Season Champions (1): 2013–14
  - Pacific Division Playoff Champions (2): 2013–14, 2014–15
- National Premier Soccer League
  - Southwest Conference Regular Season Champions (2): 2021, 2024
  - E-NPSL National Champions (1): 2020
