= Toros Mexico =

- Toros Mexico logo
- Founded: 2009
- Ground: Parque UniSantos; Tijuana, Mexico
- Chairman: Joe Pollard
- Coach: Joe Pollard
- League: Premier Arena Soccer League
- Website: http://www.torosdemexico.com
Home colors

Toros Mexico was a professional indoor soccer team based in Tijuana, Mexico, that played in the United States–based Premier Arena Soccer League. They played their home games at Parque UniSantos in Tijuana. The team was led by owner and head coach Joe Pollard.

The Toros played the 2009–10, 2010–11, and 2011–12 seasons at Arena Furati as "Revolución Tijuana". In September 2012, Ramon Quezada and Eduardo Vele sold the team to head coach Joe Pollard but retained the rights to the old name and logo.

On September 11, 2014, the Ontario Fury purchased the Toros and announced that the team would serve as an official developmental squad for the Fury. Ontario hired owner Joe Pollard as a Fury assistant coach and he will continue to run the Toros. The team will play in the Premier Arena Soccer League, starting in 2014-15.

== Year-by-year ==
League champions	Runners-up	Division champions	Playoff berth

Year	League	Record	GF	GA	Finish	Playoffs	Avg. attendance
2010–11	PASL-Pro	7-8	154	125	3rd, Western	Did not qualify	?
2011–12	PASL	10-6	176	132	2nd, Western	Semi-finals	195
2012–13	PASL	7-8	122	121	2nd, Southwestern	Divisional Final	250
2013–14	PASL	9–7	175	118	3rd, Pacific	Divisional Round	262
