= 2014–15 Oxford City FC of Texas season =

Oxford City FC of Texas
2014–15 MASL season
- CEO: Thomas Anthony Guerriero
- Head Coach: Chris "Topper" Cogan (games 1–11); Mariano Bollella (games 12–20)
- Arena: Ford Arena; 5115 IH-10 South; Beaumont, Texas 77705
- Major Arena Soccer League: 3rd, Southern (regular season)
- Ron Newman Cup: Lost Division Semi-Final
- Top goalscorer: Lucas Totti (35 goals, 20 assists)
- Highest home attendance: 1,388 (November 8 vs. Hidalgo La Fiera)
- Lowest home attendance: 0 (January 10 vs. Brownsville Barracudas)
- Average home league attendance: 947 (10 games)

The 2014–15 Oxford City FC of Texas season was the third season for the Beaumont, Texas-based professional indoor soccer franchise. Founded as the Texas Strikers in 2012, new ownership rebranded the team as Oxford City FC of Texas in July 2014.

The team was led by Oxford City Football Club, Inc. CEO Thomas Anthony Guerriero and head coach Mariano Bollella. Texas was a Southern Division team in the Major Arena Soccer League and played their home games at Ford Arena in Beaumont, Texas. They finished the regular season with a 12–8 record then fell to the Dallas Sidekicks in the first round of the MASL playoffs.

== Season summary ==
Oxford City FC of Texas struggled to start the 2014–15 season, dropping their first two games, but rebounded with three consecutive wins. Although another loss briefly returned the team to .500, wins in their next two games gave the team more wins (5) by that point in the season than they earned in their two full seasons as the Texas Strikers (4). The team ended 2014 with a 7–4 record but with the new year (and the mid-season folding of Hidalgo La Fiera) came the addition of several former Hidalgo players and the replacement of head coach Chris "Topper" Cogan by former Hidalgo head coach Mariano Bollella. The team began 2015 with a three-game winning streak, including a road win against the Dallas Sidekicks, before losing 5 of their remaining 6 games, including home and road losses to Dallas. Their 12–8 record was good enough for third place in the Southern Division and qualified the Beaumont-based team for the playoffs. They faced rival Dallas at the Allen Event Center and lost 5–6, ending their playoff run.

== History ==
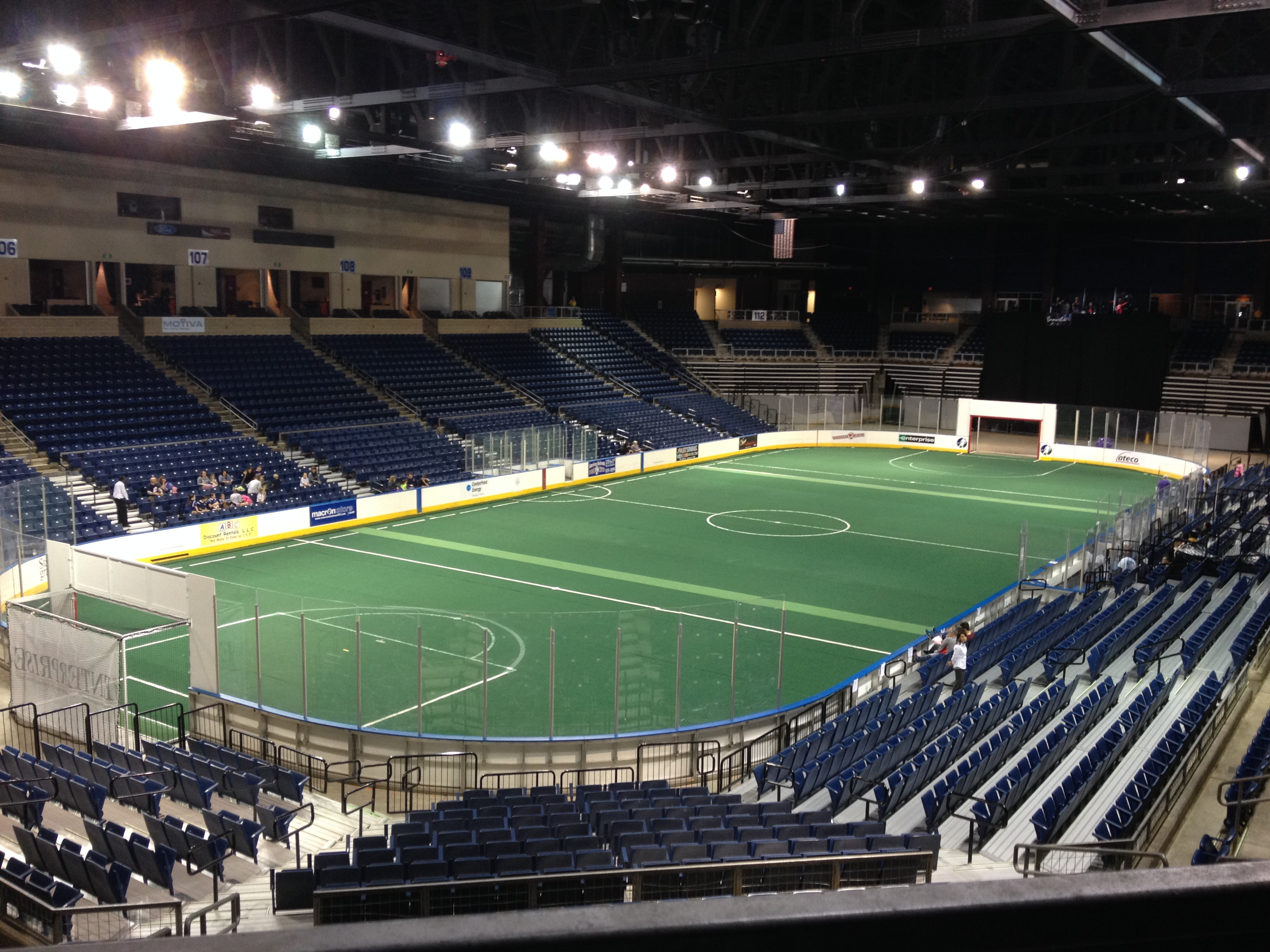
Ford Arena set up for soccer in December 2014.

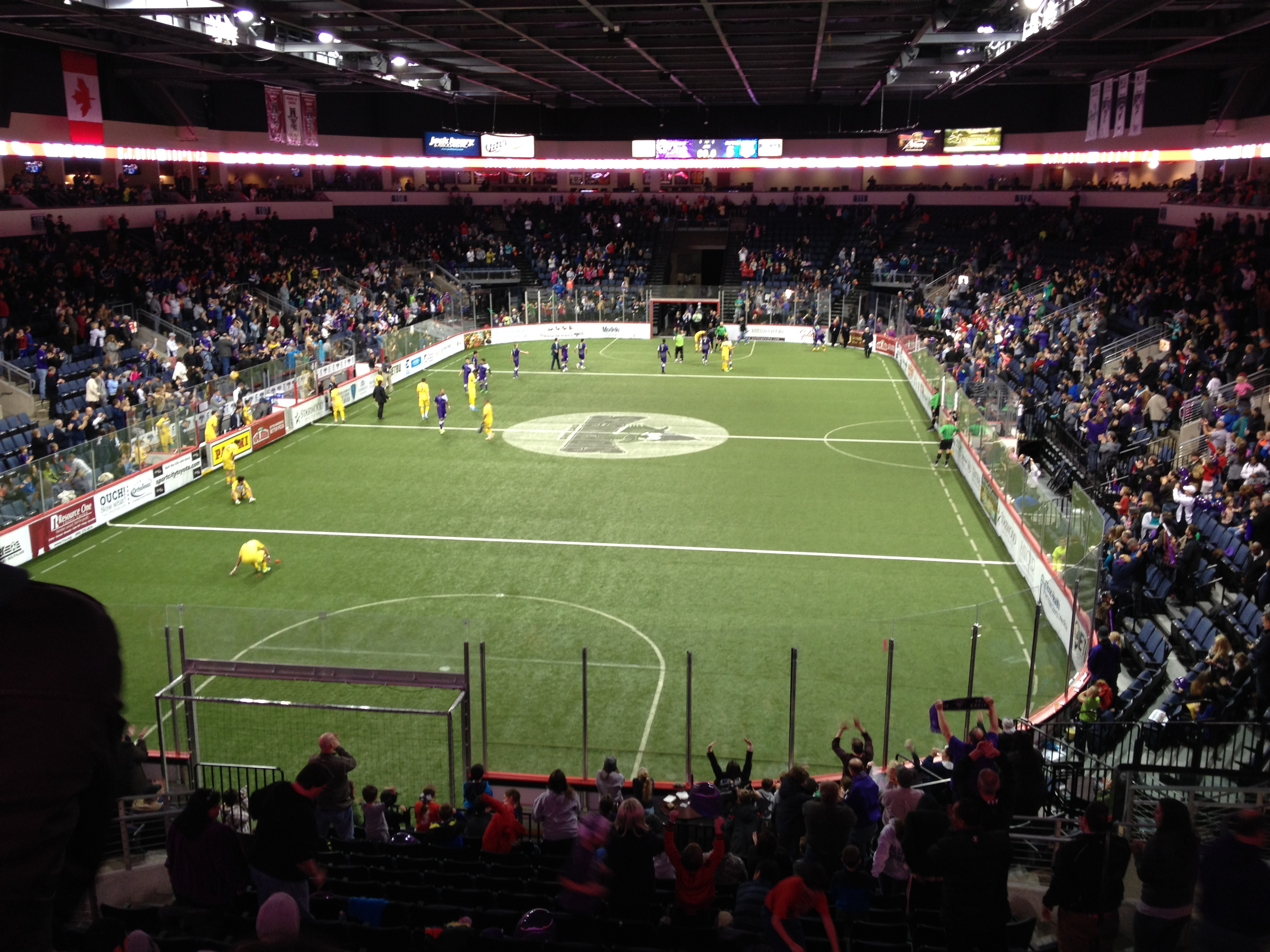
Playoff game at Dallas on March 1, 2015.

The 2012–13 season was the first for the expansion Texas Strikers, Beaumont's first professional soccer team. The team struggled early on but split its final six regular season matches, finishing with a 3–13 record. The Strikers stumbled from the start of the 2013–14 season, dropping 15 consecutive matches. Only a home win over the Tulsa Revolution in their final match allowed them to earn a 1–15 record. The team did not qualify for post-season play.

In May 2014, the Professional Arena Soccer League added six teams from the failed third incarnation of the Major Indoor Soccer League and reorganized as the Major Arena Soccer League. With the league expansion and reorganization, Texas moved from the Central division to the new Southern division. The other Southern teams for 2014–15 are Texas-based Brownsville Barracudas, Dallas Sidekicks, and Hidalgo La Fiera plus Mexico-based Monterrey Flash and Saltillo Rancho Seco.

== Off-field moves ==
In September 2014, the team announced that pre-game and post-game entertainment would be provided by a series of tribute bands. The announced acts include Back in Black, Rock and Roll Over, Light and Shade, and Van Hagar.

On December 15, team owner Oxford City Football Club, Inc. announced that it had "successfully come to terms to sell" Oxford City FC of Texas to an unspecified "Latin American group", pending league approval. CEO Thomas Anthony Guerriero said that their "complete focus as an organization needs to be" on Oxford City F.C. which plays in Conference North, a division of Football Conference at Step 2 of the National League System and the sixth overall tier of the English football league system. The new owners were to have licensed the rights to use the "Oxford City FC of Texas" name through the end of the current MASL season. The sale was not completed before the end of the season and the announcement removed from the team's website.

== Schedule ==
Win Loss

=== Pre-season ===
Game	Day	Date	Kickoff	Opponent	Results		Location	Attendance
Game	Day	Date	Kickoff	Opponent	Score	Record	Location	Attendance
1	Sunday	October 26	5:05pm	at Baton Rouge IFC	W 5–1	1–0	Premier Soccer Indoor Complex	
1	Sunday	November 2	3:05pm	Houston La Juve	W 15–4	2–0	Ford Arena	

=== Regular season ===
Game	Day	Date	Kickoff	Opponent	Results		Location	Attendance
Game	Day	Date	Kickoff	Opponent	Score	Record	Location	Attendance
1	Saturday	November 8	7:05pm	Hidalgo La Fiera	L 7–13	0–1	Ford Arena	1,388
2	Friday	November 14	7:05pm	at Tulsa Revolution	L 5–8	0–2	Cox Business Center	562
3	Sunday	November 16	3:05pm	at Wichita B-52s^{1}	W 10–9 (SO)	1–2	Hartman Arena	885
4	Saturday	November 22	7:05pm	Saltillo Rancho Seco	W 9–7	2–2	Ford Arena	1,243
5	Saturday	November 29	6:00pm	at Brownsville Barracudas	W 5–4	3–2	Barracudas Sports Complex	450
6	Sunday	November 30	3:00pm	at Hidalgo La Fiera	L 7–9	3–3	State Farm Arena	426
7	Saturday	December 6	7:05pm	Brownsville Barracudas	W 7–4	4–3	Ford Arena	1,079
8	Saturday	December 13	7:05pm	Tulsa Revolution	W 17–4	5–3	Ford Arena	1,078
9	Saturday	December 20	7:05pm	at Wichita B-52s	W 8–7	6–3	Hartman Arena	1,340
10	Saturday	December 27	7:05pm	Dallas Sidekicks	L 4–15	6–4	Ford Arena	1,203
11	Sunday	December 28	3:05pm	Saltillo Rancho Seco	W 16–8	7–4	Ford Arena	986
12	Saturday	January 3	7:05pm	at Dallas Sidekicks^{2}	W 5–4	8–4	Allen Event Center	3,811
13	Saturday	January 10	2:30pm	Brownsville Barracudas^{3}	W 8–4	9–4	Ford Arena	0
14	Saturday	January 10	7:05pm	Brownsville Barracudas^{3}	W 10–3	10–4	Ford Arena	740
15	Sunday	January 18	3:00pm	at Dallas Sidekicks	L 4–5	10–5	Allen Event Center	2,344
16	Saturday	January 31	7:05pm	Monterrey Flash	L 2–5	10–6	Ford Arena	921
17	Saturday	February 7	7:05pm	Dallas Sidekicks	L 2–7	10–7	Ford Arena	840
18	Friday	February 13	8:35pm	at Saltillo Rancho Seco	W 13–7	11–7	Deportivo Rancho-Seco Saltillo	?
19	Sunday	February 15	5:05pm	at Monterrey Flash	L 3–5	11–8	Arena Monterrey	2,622
20	Saturday	February 21	6:00pm	at Brownsville Barracudas	W 9–6	12–8	Barracudas Sports Complex	240

^{1} Originally scheduled for Saturday, November 15.
^{2} Rescheduled due to mid-season withdrawal of Hidalgo La Fiera, maintaining 20-game schedule.
^{3} Replaces Hidalgo game originally scheduled for that date.

=== Post-season ===
Game	Day	Date	Kickoff	Opponent	Results		Location	Attendance
Game	Day	Date	Kickoff	Opponent	Score	Record	Location	Attendance
Division Semi-Final	Sunday	March 1	2:00pm	at Dallas Sidekicks	L 5–6	0–1	Allen Event Center	3,421

== Awards and honors ==
Texas forward Lucas Totti was selected for the 2014-15 MASL All-League Third Team. Totti was also named to the league's all-rookie team for 2014–15. Texas goalkeeper Kyle Renfro earned honorable mention for the all-rookie team.

On March 13, the MASL announced the finalists for its major year-end awards. These nominees included Texas forward Lucas Totti for both Most Valuable Player and Rookie of the Year.
