= 2014–15 Saltillo Rancho Seco season =

Saltillo Rancho Seco
2014–15 MASL season
- Owner: Marco Antonio Davila De Leon
- Head Coach: Elizandro Campos
- Arena: Deportivo Rancho-Seco Saltillo; Saltillo, Coahuila
- Major Arena Soccer League: 5th, Central (regular season)
- Top goalscorer: Victor Baez (12 goals, 13 assists)
- Highest home attendance: 980 (November 28 vs. Monterrey Flash)
- Lowest home attendance: 70 (February 27 vs. Brownsville Barracudas)
- Average home league attendance: 390 (7/10 games)

The 2014–15 Saltillo Rancho Seco season was the second international season of the Saltillo Rancho Seco professional indoor soccer club. The Saltillo Rancho Seco, a Central Division team in the Major Arena Soccer League, played their home games at Deportivo Rancho-Seco Saltillo in Saltillo, the capital of the northern Mexican state of Coahuila.

The team was led by owner/general manager Marco Antonio Davila De Leon and head coach Elizandro Campos with assistant coach Jesus Monroy. Saltillo won only 2 games, both at home, giving them a 2–17 record and leaving them out of the playoffs.

== Season summary ==
Saltillo struggled to find its footing in the MASL and lost the first 8 games of the season. The team finally won a game on January 9 hosting the Dallas Sidekicks at the outdoor Deportivo Rancho-Seco Saltillo amidst freezing fog and frigid temperatures. Saltillo dropped another 8 consecutive games before splitting their final homestand against the Brownsville Barracudas. With the collapse of Hidalgo La Fiera leaving them one game short of the usual 20, Saltillo finished 2–17 and in 5th place in the Southern Division. They did not qualify for post-season play.

== History ==
In 2013, Saltillo became the third team based in Mexico to join the Professional Arena Soccer League. In May 2014, the Professional Arena Soccer League added six refugee teams from the failed third incarnation of the Major Indoor Soccer League and reorganized as the Major Arena Soccer League.

With the league expansion and reorganization, Saltillo moved from the Central division to the new Southern division. The other Southern teams for 2014–15 are the Brownsville Barracudas, Dallas Sidekicks, Hidalgo La Fiera, Monterrey Flash, and Beaumont-based Oxford City FC of Texas.

For the past four seasons, Saltillo has been a successful member of the Liga Mexicana de Futbol Rápido Profesional (LMFR) and remains a member of both leagues. The team struggled in the 2013–14 PASL season, earning a 6–10 record and failing to qualify for post-season play.

== Off-field moves ==
Revenues from the team's November 28 home opener against the Monterrey Flash were donated in support of the annual Teletón which raises funds for rehabilitation centers for disabled children.

== Schedule ==
Win Loss Cancelled

=== Regular season ===
Game	Day	Date	Kickoff	Opponent	Results		Location	Attendance
Game	Day	Date	Kickoff	Opponent	Score	Record	Location	Attendance
1	Saturday	November 1	6:00pm	at Brownsville Barracudas	L 11–12	0–1	Barracudas Sports Complex	850
2	Saturday	November 22	7:05pm	at Oxford City FC of Texas	L 7–9	0–2	Ford Arena	1,243
3	Friday	November 28	8:35pm	Monterrey Flash	L 5–9	0–3	Deportivo Rancho-Seco Saltillo	980
4	Friday	December 5	8:35pm	Monterrey Flash^{1}	L 3–9	0–4	Deportivo Rancho-Seco Saltillo	635
5	Friday	December 12	8:35pm	Hidalgo La Fiera	L 10–11	0–5	Deportivo Rancho-Seco Saltillo	200
6	Friday	December 19	8:35pm	Las Vegas Legends	L 6–7	0–6	Deportivo Rancho-Seco Saltillo	200
7	Sunday	December 28	3:05pm	at Oxford City FC of Texas	L 8–16	0–7	Ford Arena	986
8	Saturday	January 3	6:00pm	at Brownsville Barracudas	L 6–7 (OT)	0–8	Barracudas Sports Complex	225
9	Friday	January 9	8:35pm	Dallas Sidekicks	W 7–6	1–8	Deportivo Rancho-Seco Saltillo	?
10	Wednesday	January 14	8:35pm	at Monterrey Flash^{3}	L 1–13	1–9	Arena Monterrey	1,134
11	Sunday	January 18	5:05pm	at Monterrey Flash^{4}	L 0–15	1–10	Arena Monterrey	1,328
12	Friday	January 23	8:35pm	Missouri Comets	L 8–14	1–11	Deportivo Rancho-Seco Saltillo	?
13	Friday	January 30	7:05pm	at Tulsa Revolution	L 8–9	1–12	Expo Square Pavilion	?
14	Saturday	January 31	7:00pm	at Dallas Sidekicks	L 3–11	1–13	Allen Event Center	3,833
15	Saturday	February 7	5:00pm	Monterrey Flash^{5}	L 4–11	1–14	Deportivo Rancho-Seco Saltillo	500
16	Friday	February 13	8:35pm	Oxford City FC of Texas	L 7–13	1–15	Deportivo Rancho-Seco Saltillo	?
17	Sunday	February 15	3:05pm	at Hidalgo La Fiera	CANCELLED	1–15	State Farm Arena	
18	Sunday	February 22	1:00pm	at Brownsville Barracudas^{2}	L 8–11	1–16	Barracudas Sports Complex	140
19	Friday	February 27	8:30pm	Brownsville Barracudas^{6}	W 15–10	2–16	Deportivo Rancho-Seco Saltillo	70
20	Saturday	February 28	5:00pm	Brownsville Barracudas^{5,6}	L 4–8	2–17	Deportivo Rancho-Seco Saltillo	145

^{1} Originally scheduled for January 2 but moved forward due to availability and to avoid holiday travel.
^{2} Originally scheduled for November 7 but postponed due to weather.
^{3} Originally scheduled for December 7 but postponed due to scheduling conflicts with the Liga MX semi-finals.
^{4} Originally scheduled for December 14 but postponed due to scheduling conflicts with the Liga MX finals.
^{5} Rescheduled due to mid-season withdrawal of Hidalgo La Fiera.
^{6} Postponed due to travel issues caused by "recent acts of violence" in northern Mexico
