= 2014–15 Brownsville Barracudas season =

Brownsville Barracudas
2014–15 MASL season
- Owner: Oscar Ruvalcaba
- Head Coach: Raul Salazar
- Arena: Barracudas Sports Complex; Brownsville, Texas
- Major Arena Soccer League: 4th, Southern (regular season)
- Top goalscorer: Moises Gonzalez (30 goals, 11 assists)
- Highest home attendance: 850 (November 1 vs. Saltillo Rancho Seco)
- Lowest home attendance: 225 (January 3 vs. Saltillo Rancho Seco)
- Average home league attendance: 435 (11 games)

The 2014–15 Brownsville Barracudas season was the inaugural season for the Brownsville Barracudas professional indoor soccer club. (The team was also known as Barracudas FC.) The Barracudas, a Southern Division team in the Major Arena Soccer League, played their home games at the Barracudas Sports Complex in Brownsville, Texas.

The team was led by owner Oscar Ruvalcaba, general manager Ricardo Rodriguez, and head coach Raul Salazar. The Barracudas finished the 2014–15 season with a 4–16 record, good enough for 4th place in the Southern Division but not enough to qualify for the playoffs.

== Season summary ==
Brownsville began the season with a road defeat by the Monterrey Flash before a home opening win against Saltillo Rancho Seco. The team then lost 8 consecutive games before an overtime win at home against Saltillo. Another 6 losses (3 each to the Dallas Sidekicks and Oxford City FC of Texas) preceded a win in Brownsville's final home game against Saltillo. Splitting a road series in Saltillo to end the season, Brownsville ended with a 4–16 record and 4th place in the Southern Division. All 4 of Brownsville's wins came at the expense of Saltillo.

== History ==
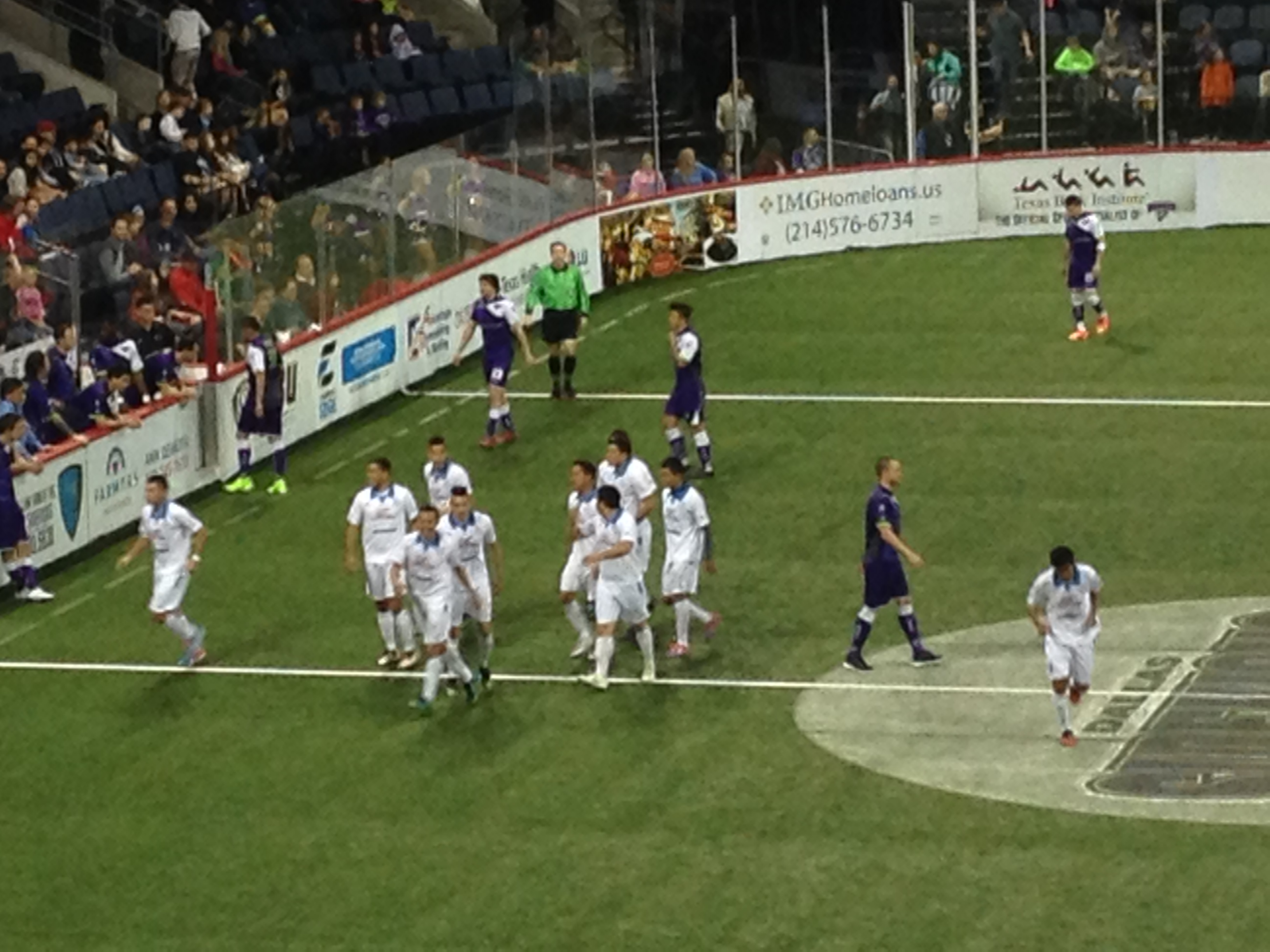
Barracudas on the road at the Allen Event Center.

Team owner Oscar Ruvalcaba started laying the groundwork for this team in 2001 when he began developing the Barracudas Sports Complex to add more soccer fields in his community. The complex opened in 2004 and began hosting several games each week. Barracudas FC organized as an amateur club that same year and, a decade later, the complex hosts almost 200 teams playing 7-on-7 soccer each week. In May 2014, Ruvalcaba secured an expansion franchise in the new Major Arena Soccer League and began construction of a 2,000-seat open-air soccer arena.

== Off-field moves ==
In May 2014, the Professional Arena Soccer League added six refugee teams from the failed third incarnation of the Major Indoor Soccer League and reorganized as the Major Arena Soccer League. The 2014–15 MASL season will be 20 games long, 4 more than the 16 regular season games of recent PASL seasons. Brownsville joins the league in the new Southern division. The other Southern teams for 2014–15 are the Dallas Sidekicks, Hidalgo La Fiera, Monterrey Flash, Saltillo Rancho Seco, and Beaumont-based Oxford City FC of Texas.

The Barracudas publicly displayed their new MASL uniforms for the first time on October 18 in the food court at Sunrise Mall in Brownsville. The new uniforms, manufactured by Pirma, use the same colors as the team has worn since its founding as an amateur club in 2004. Brownsville's home uniforms are light blue with white sides and the away uniforms are white with a blue collar.

== Schedule ==
Win Loss Postponed

=== Pre-season ===
Game	Day	Date	Kickoff	Opponent	Results		Location	Attendance
Game	Day	Date	Kickoff	Opponent	Score	Record	Location	Attendance
1	Sunday	June 29	3:15pm	at Austin Capitals (PASL)	L 3–2	0–1	South Zone South Austin	

=== Regular season ===
Game	Day	Date	Kickoff	Opponent	Results		Location	Attendance
Game	Day	Date	Kickoff	Opponent	Score	Record	Location	Attendance
1	Sunday	October 26	5:05pm	at Monterrey Flash	L 6–15	0–1	Arena Monterrey	6,339
2	Saturday	November 1	6:00pm	Saltillo Rancho Seco	W 12–11	1–1	Barracudas Sports Complex	850
3	Saturday	November 15	7:00pm	at Dallas Sidekicks	L 2–14	1–2	Allen Event Center	3,656
4	Saturday	November 22	6:00pm	Hidalgo La Fiera	L 3–6	1–3	Barracudas Sports Complex	715
5	Saturday	November 29	6:00pm	Oxford City FC of Texas	L 4–5	1–4	Barracudas Sports Complex	450
6	Sunday	November 30	5:05pm	at Monterrey Flash	L 1–14	1–5	Arena Monterrey	1,764
7	Saturday	December 6	7:05pm	at Oxford City FC of Texas	L 4–7	1–6	Ford Arena	1,079
8	Saturday	December 20	6:00pm	Dallas Sidekicks	L 3–11	1–7	Barracudas Sports Complex	575
9	Saturday	December 27	6:00pm	Monterrey Flash^{1}	L 1–6	1–8	Barracudas Sports Complex	375
10	Sunday	December 28	6:00pm	Monterrey Flash	L 8–9	1–9	Barracudas Sports Complex	475
11	Saturday	January 3	6:00pm	Saltillo Rancho Seco	W 7–6 (OT)	2–9	Barracudas Sports Complex	225
12	Saturday	January 10	2:30pm	at Oxford City FC of Texas^{3}	L 4–8	2–10	Ford Arena	0
13	Saturday	January 10	7:05pm	at Oxford City FC of Texas^{3}	L 3–10	2–11	Ford Arena	740
14	Saturday	January 24	6:00pm	Dallas Sidekicks	L 5–9	2–12	Barracudas Sports Complex	375
15	Sunday	January 25	6:00pm	Dallas Sidekicks^{3}	L 6–7	2–13	Barracudas Sports Complex	375
16	Sunday	February 15	3:00pm	at Dallas Sidekicks	L 3–11	2–14	Allen Event Center	3,109
17	Saturday	February 21	6:00pm	Oxford City FC of Texas	L 6–9	2–15	Barracudas Sports Complex	240
18	Sunday	February 22	1:00pm	Saltillo Rancho Seco^{2}	W 11–8	3–15	Barracudas Sports Complex	140
19	Friday	February 27	8:30pm	at Saltillo Rancho Seco^{4}	L 10–15	3–16	Deportivo Rancho-Seco Saltillo	70
20	Saturday	February 28	5:00pm	at Saltillo Rancho Seco^{3,4}	W 8–4	4–16	Deportivo Rancho-Seco Saltillo	145

^{1} Originally scheduled for January 31 but rescheduled after Hidalgo La Fiera left the league mid-season.
^{2} Originally scheduled for November 7 but postponed due to weather.
^{3} Rescheduled due to mid-season withdrawal of Hidalgo, maintaining 20-game schedule.
^{4} Postponed due to travel issues caused by "recent acts of violence" in northern Mexico

== Awards and honors ==
The Brownsville Herald declared the debut of the Barracudas franchise as one of the Brownsville metro area's best sports stories of 2014.

Brownsville's Moises Gonzalez earned honorable mention for the league's all-rookie team for 2014-15.
