= 2014–15 Monterrey Flash season =

Monterrey Flash
2014–15 MASL season
- Owner: Gerardo Guerra Lozano
- Head Coach: Genoni Martínez
- Arena: Arena Monterrey; Ave. Madero #2500 Oriente, Colonia Obrera; Monterrey, Nuevo León, Mexico; C.P. 64800
- Major Arena Soccer League: 1st, Southern (regular season)
- Ron Newman Cup: MASL Champion
- Top goalscorer: Lourenço Andrade (29 goals, 13 assists)
- Highest home attendance: 6,339 (October 26 vs. Brownsville Barracudas)
- Lowest home attendance: 1,134 (January 14 vs. Saltillo Rancho Seco)
- Average home league attendance: 2,844 (10 games)

The 2014–15 Monterrey Flash season was the second season of the Monterrey Flash professional indoor soccer club. The Monterrey Flash, a Southern Division team in the Major Arena Soccer League, played their home games in Arena Monterrey in Monterrey, Nuevo León, Mexico.

The team was led by owner Gerardo Guerra Lozano and head coach Genoni Martínez with assistant coach Marco Coria. The Flash were one of two Mexico-based teams (along with Saltillo Rancho Seco) participating in the MASL for the 2014–15 season. The team finished the regular season with an 18–2 record and qualified for the MASL playoffs. They defeated the Dallas Sidekicks and Las Vegas Legends to win the Western Conference Championship. They beat the Baltimore Blast in a best-of-three series for the league championship.

== Season summary ==
The Flash started the season strong, winning their first 8 games, most by wide margins. In the early going, only the Las Vegas Legends kept the Monterrey offense grounded and held on to finish one goal back. Their first loss of the season was at home against Las Vegas on December 21. The Flash rebounded to win 6 consecutive games before falling to the Missouri Comets in overtime on January 25. Four more wins completed the regular season, leaving them with an 18–2 record and first place in the Southern Division. This qualified them to host the Division Final where they defeated the Dallas Sidekicks on March 8. The Flash defeated the Las Vegas Legends on the road and at home in a best-of-three series to win the Western Conference championship. They faced the Baltimore Blast for the MASL Championship and the 2014–15 Ron Newman Cup. After winning in Baltimore and losing the first game at home, Monterrey won the mini-game tiebreaker 4–3 with an overtime goal by midfielder Gustavo Rosales.

== History ==
The previous team to bear the Monterrey Flash name joined the Liga Mexicana de Futbol Rápido Profesional (LMFRPro) in 2011. They won the LMFRPro league championship in that first season then finished second to the San Diego Sockers in the 2012 FIFRA Club Championship. In September 2012, Lozano relocated the team to Texas, renamed them the Rio Grande Valley Flash, and joined the PASL. In July 2013, the team announced that Victor Fernandez had assumed ownership of the franchise and renamed it "La Fiera FC".

Lozano returned to Monterrey and started a new Monterrey Flash with the intention of playing in both the LMFRPro and the PASL. The Flash started their debut season strong, finished with a 13–3 record, and secured the third spot in the Central Division playoffs. They defeated the Dallas Sidekicks in the Division Semifinal then lost to Hidalgo La Fiera in the Division Final.

== Off-field moves ==
In May 2014, the Professional Arena Soccer League added six refugee teams from the failed third incarnation of the Major Indoor Soccer League and reorganized as the Major Arena Soccer League. The 2014–15 MASL season will be 20 games long, 4 more than the 16 regular season games of recent PASL seasons.

With the league expansion and reorganization, Monterrey moved from the Central division to the new Southern division. The other Southern teams for 2014–15 are the Brownsville Barracudas, Dallas Sidekicks, Hidalgo La Fiera, Saltillo Rancho Seco, and Beaumont-based Oxford City FC of Texas.

== Schedule ==
Win Loss Cancelled

=== Pre-season ===
Game	Day	Date	Kickoff	Opponent	Results		Location	Attendance
Game	Day	Date	Kickoff	Opponent	Score	Record	Location	Attendance
1	Saturday	October 18	3:05pm	Troyanos de la UdeM	W 13–0	1–0	UdeM Arena	
2	Wednesday	October 22	7:05pm	Tigres de la UANL	Cancelled‡	1–0	Ciudad Universitaria	

‡ Game cancelled due to inclement weather and an outdoor arena.

=== Regular season ===
Game	Day	Date	Kickoff	Opponent	Results		Location	Attendance
Game	Day	Date	Kickoff	Opponent	Score	Record	Location	Attendance
1	Sunday	October 26	5:05pm	Brownsville Barracudas	W 15–6	1–0	Arena Monterrey	6,339
2	Friday	November 7	7:00pm	at Ontario Fury	W 7–5	2–0	Citizens Business Bank Arena	2,219
3	Sunday	November 9	3:00pm	at Las Vegas Legends	W 3–2	3–0	Orleans Arena	1,970
4	Wednesday	November 12	8:35pm	Hidalgo La Fiera	W 7–4	4–0	Arena Monterrey	3,740
5	Sunday	November 23	3:05pm	at Hidalgo La Fiera	W 11–2	5–0	State Farm Arena	1,468
6	Friday	November 28	8:30pm	at Saltillo Rancho Seco	W 9–5	6–0	Deportivo Rancho-Seco Saltillo	980
7	Sunday	November 30	5:05pm	Brownsville Barracudas	W 14–1	7–0	Arena Monterrey	1,764
8	Friday	December 5	8:35pm	at Saltillo Rancho Seco^{1}	W 9–3	8–0	Deportivo Rancho-Seco Saltillo	635
9	Sunday	December 21	5:05pm	Las Vegas Legends	L 6–8	8–1	Arena Monterrey	2,684
10	Saturday	December 27	6:00pm	at Brownsville Barracudas^{5}	W 6–1	9–1	Barracudas Sports Complex	375
11	Sunday	December 28	6:00pm	at Brownsville Barracudas	W 9–8	10–1	Barracudas Sports Complex	475
12	Sunday	January 11	5:05pm	Dallas Sidekicks	W 8–2	11–1	Arena Monterrey	1,758
13	Sunday	January 11	7:05pm	Dallas Sidekicks^{4}	W 3–2 (OT)	12–1	Arena Monterrey	1,748
14	Wednesday	January 14	8:35pm	Saltillo Rancho Seco^{2}	W 13–1	13–1	Arena Monterrey	1,134
15	Sunday	January 18	5:05pm	Saltillo Rancho Seco^{5}	W 15–0	14–1	Arena Monterrey	1,328
16	Sunday	January 25	5:05pm	Missouri Comets	L 7–8 (OT)	14–2	Arena Monterrey	5,327
17	Saturday	January 31	7:05pm	at Oxford City FC of Texas	W 5–2	15–2	Ford Arena	921
18	Saturday	February 7	5:00pm	at Saltillo Rancho Seco^{3}	W 11–4	16–2	Deportivo Rancho-Seco Saltillo	500
19	Sunday	February 15	5:05pm	Oxford City FC of Texas	W 5–3	17–2	Arena Monterrey	2,622
20	Saturday	February 21	7:00pm	at Dallas Sidekicks	W 6–2	18–2	Allen Event Center	4,670

^{1} Originally scheduled for January 2 but moved forward due to availability and to avoid holiday travel.
^{2} Originally scheduled for December 7 but postponed due to scheduling conflicts.
^{3} Originally scheduled for December 14 but postponed due to scheduling conflicts with the Liga MX finals.
^{4} Mini-game due to mid-season withdrawal of Hidalgo La Fiera, maintaining 20-game schedule.
^{5} Replaces Hidalgo game originally scheduled for that date.

=== Post-season ===
Game	Day	Date	Kickoff	Opponent	Results		Location	Attendance
Game	Day	Date	Kickoff	Opponent	Score	Record	Location	Attendance
Division Final	Sunday	March 8	5:05pm	Dallas Sidekicks	W 11–1	1–0	Arena Monterrey	6,113
Western Final #1	Friday	March 13	7:05pm	at Las Vegas Legends	W 7–6	2–0	Las Vegas Sports Park	855
Western Final #2	Sunday	March 15	5:05pm	Las Vegas Legends	W 7–4	3–0	Arena Monterrey	7,028
MASL Final #1	Friday	March 20	7:35pm	at Baltimore Blast♠	W 6–4 (2OT)	4–0	Royal Farms Arena	6,712
MASL Final #2	Sunday	March 22	5:05pm	Baltimore Blast	L 4–6	4–1	Arena Monterrey	8,783
MASL Final #3	Sunday	March 22	7:35pm^{1}	Baltimore Blast	W 4–3 (OT)	5–1	Arena Monterrey	8,783

♠ Game played with multi-point scoring (most goals worth 2 points; select goals worth 3 points).
^{1} Mini-game played as a tie-breaker.

== Awards and honors ==
Monterrey goalkeeper Diego Reynoso was named to the league's all-rookie team for 2014–15.

Flash midfielder Gustavo Rosales was named Most Valuable Player for the MASL Playoffs. He scored the decisive overtime goal to win the Ron Newman Cup for Monterrey.
