= 2012–13 Real Phoenix season =

Professional indoor soccer matches

Real Phoenix
2012–13 PASL season
- General Manager/CEO: Rosario Lopez Jr.
- Head Coach: Kevin Grub
- Arena: Barney Family Sports Complex; Queen Creek, Arizona; Arizona Sports Complex; Glendale, Arizona
- PASL: 4th, Southwestern
- US Open Cup: Wild Card
- Highest home attendance: 560 (January 26, 2013) vs Toros Mexico
- Lowest home attendance: 49 (December 29, 2012) vs Turlock Express
- Average home league attendance: 190 (over 8 home games)

The 2012–13 Real Phoenix season was the first and only season of the Real Phoenix professional indoor soccer club. Real Phoenix, a Southwestern Division team in the Professional Arena Soccer League, played their first six home games in the Barney Family Sports Complex in the greater Phoenix suburb of Queen Creek, Arizona. The team played the final two home games of the season at the Arizona Sports Complex in Glendale, Arizona. The team was led by general manager Rosario Lopez Jr., head coach Kevin Grub, and assistant coach Rodolfo Hernandez.

== Season summary ==
Real Phoenix struggled in the regular season, ultimately earning a 4–12 record and last place in the PASL's four-team Southwestern Division, and failed to advance to the postseason. The team also struggled at the box office, placing 18th in the 19-team league for average home attendance.

In late January 2013, the team informed the PASL that they were financially unable to complete their road schedule and the league revoked their franchise. The league sent a replacement squad coached by Kevin Leonard and filled out largely by members of his Texas Xtreme Premier Arena Soccer League team to cover Phoenix's road dates in south Texas. The team's final two home games were played with a squad of regular Real Phoenix players but with Kevin Leonard remaining as head coach.

The team participated in the 2012–13 United States Open Cup for Arena Soccer. They lost to the Las Vegas Legends in the Wild Card round, abruptly ending their run in the tournament.

== Schedule ==
Win Tie Loss

=== Pre-season ===
Game	Day	Date	Kickoff	Opponent	Results		Location	Attendance
Game	Day	Date	Kickoff	Opponent	Final Score	Record	Location	Attendance
1	Saturday	October 20	8:00pm	Stars of Mexico	W 7–6	–––	Barney Family Sports Complex	

=== Regular season ===
Game	Day	Date	Kickoff	Opponent	Results		Location	Attendance
Game	Day	Date	Kickoff	Opponent	Final Score	Record	Location	Attendance
1	Saturday	November 3	8:00pm	Toros Mexico	W 4–3	1–0	Barney Family Sports Complex	227
2	Saturday	November 10	7:05pm (8:05pm Mountain)	at San Diego Sockers	L 5–11	1–1	Valley View Casino Center	2,913
3	Sunday	November 11	3:00pm (4:00pm Mountain)	at Toros Mexico	L 6–11	1–2	UniSantos Park	442
4	Saturday	November 24	6:05pm	at Arizona Storm	L 8–10	1–3	Arizona Sports Complex	200
5	Sunday	December 1	8:00pm	Arizona Storm	W 7–1	2–3	Barney Family Sports Complex	125
6	Saturday	December 8	8:00pm	San Diego Sockers	L 3–9	2–4	Barney Family Sports Complex	220
7	Saturday	December 15	7:00pm	at Las Vegas Legends†	L 4–10	2–5	Orleans Arena	765
8	Sunday	December 23	1:00pm (2:00pm Mountain)	at Toros Mexico	L 9–17	2–6	UniSantos Park	150
9	Saturday	December 29	8:00pm	Turlock Express	W 9–8 (OT)	3–6	Barney Family Sports Complex	49
10	Saturday	January 12	8:00pm	Las Vegas Legends	L 1–6	3–7	Barney Family Sports Complex	203
11	Saturday	January 19	8:00pm	Texas Strikers	W 10–6	4–7	Barney Family Sports Complex	69
12	Saturday	January 26	8:00pm	Toros Mexico	L 7–8 (OT)	4–8	Arizona Sports Complex §	560
13	Friday	February 1	7:30pm (6:30pm Mountain)	at Rio Grande Valley Flash	L ♥ 3–21	4–9	State Farm Arena	1,521
14	Saturday	February 2	7:05pm (6:05pm Mountain)	at Texas Strikers	L ♥ 8–13	4–10	Ford Arena	398
15	Saturday	February 9	8:00pm	Las Vegas Legends	L 4–13	4–11	Arizona Sports Complex §	69
16	Sunday	February 17	5:00pm	at Arizona Storm	L 12–14	4–12	Arizona Sports Complex	146

† Game also counts for US Open Cup, as listed in chart below.
§ Team relocated to Arizona Sports Complex for final two home games.
♥ Replacement squad after franchise revoked by league.

=== 2012–13 US Open Cup for Arena Soccer ===
Game	Date	Kickoff	Opponent	Results		Location	Attendance
Game	Date	Kickoff	Opponent	Final Score	Record	Location	Attendance
Wild Card	December 15	7:00pm	at Las Vegas Legends	L 4–10	0–1	Orleans Arena	765
