= 2012–13 Arizona Storm season =

Arizona Storm
2012–13 PASL season
- General Manager: Steven Green
- Head Coach: Rino Green
- Arena: Arizona Sports Complex; Glendale, Arizona
- PASL: 3rd, Southwestern
- US Open Cup: Wild Card
- Highest home attendance: 222 (January 27, 2013) vs Las Vegas Legends
- Lowest home attendance: 45 (December 15, 2012) vs Anaheim Bolts
- Average home league attendance: 129 (8 home games)

The 2012–13 Arizona Storm season was the second and final season of the Arizona Storm professional indoor soccer club. The Storm, a Southwestern Division team in the Professional Arena Soccer League, played their home games in the Arizona Sports Complex in Glendale, Arizona. The team was led by general manager/assistant coach Steven Green and head coach Rino Green.

== Season summary ==
The Storm had mixed results in the regular season, earning a 6–10 record and third place in the PASL's four-team Southwestern Division, and failed to advance to the postseason. The franchise also struggled at the box office, placing last among the PASL's 19 teams in average home attendance.

The Storm participated in the 2012–13 United States Open Cup for Arena Soccer. They lost to the San Diego Sockers in the Wild Card round, abruptly ending their run in the tournament.

== History ==
The team was originally organized in 2011, playing its 2011-12 season at the 500-seat Phoenix Sports Centre in Phoenix, Arizona.

== Schedule ==
Win Tie Loss

=== Regular season ===
Game	Day	Date	Kickoff	Opponent	Results		Location	Attendance
Game	Day	Date	Kickoff	Opponent	Final Score	Record	Location	Attendance
1	Thursday	November 1	7:30pm (8:30pm Mountain)	at Las Vegas Legends	L 2–11	0–1	Orleans Arena	775
2	Sunday	November 11	6:30pm	Anaheim Bolts	W 14–13	1–1	Arizona Sports Complex	126
3	Saturday	November 17	6:05pm	San Diego Sockers†	L 3–18	1–2	Arizona Sports Complex	113
4	Saturday	November 24	6:05pm	Real Phoenix	W 10–8	2–2	Arizona Sports Complex	200
5	Saturday	December 1	8:00pm	at Real Phoenix	L 1–7	2–3	Barney Family Sports Complex	125
6	Friday	December 7	7:30pm (6:30pm Mountain)	at Rio Grande Valley Flash	L 2–16	2–4	State Farm Arena	2,035
7	Saturday	December 8	7:05pm (6:05pm Mountain)	at Texas Strikers	W 7–4	3–4	Ford Arena	717
8	Saturday	December 15	6:05pm	Anaheim Bolts	W 12–6	4–4	Arizona Sports Complex	45
9	Saturday	December 29	7:00pm (8:00pm Mountain)	at Las Vegas Legends	L 6–8	4–5	Las Vegas Sports Park	575
10	Sunday	January 13	3:05pm	Las Vegas Legends	L 5–12	4–6	Arizona Sports Complex	125
11	Sunday	January 20	4:00pm	Texas Strikers	L 8–9	4–7	Arizona Sports Complex	55
12	Sunday	January 27	5:05pm	Las Vegas Legends	L 7–17	4–8	Arizona Sports Complex	222
13	Friday	February 1	7:00pm (8:00pm Mountain)	at Turlock Express	L 2–11	4–9	Turlock Soccer Complex	494
14	Saturday	February 2	7:30pm (8:30pm Mountain)	at Sacramento Surge	W 7–6 (OT)	5–9	Off The Wall Soccer Arena	310
15	Sunday	February 10	5:05pm (6:05pm Mountain)	at San Diego Sockers	L 2–16	5–10	Valley View Casino Center	4,703
16	Sunday	February 17	5:00pm	Real Phoenix	W 14–12	6–10	Arizona Sports Complex	146

† Game also counts for US Open Cup, as listed in chart below.

=== 2012–13 US Open Cup for Arena Soccer ===
Game	Date	Kickoff	Opponent	Results		Location	Attendance
Game	Date	Kickoff	Opponent	Final Score	Record	Location	Attendance
Wild Card	November 17	5:05pm	San Diego Sockers	L 3–18	0–1	Arizona Sports Complex	125
