= 2013–14 Texas Strikers season =

Texas Strikers
2013–14 PASL season
- Head Coach: Chris "Topper" Cogan
- Arena: Ford Arena; 5115 IH-10 South; Beaumont, Texas 77705
- U.S. Open Cup: Round of 16
- Highest home attendance: 422 (November 23 vs. Monterrey Flash)
- Lowest home attendance: 239 (December 7 vs. Hidalgo La Fiera)
- Average home league attendance: 321 (8 games)

The 2013–14 Texas Strikers season was the second season of the Texas Strikers professional indoor soccer club. The Texas Strikers, a Central Division team in the Professional Arena Soccer League, played their home games at Ford Arena in Beaumont, Texas. The team was led by general manager and head coach Chris "Topper" Cogan.

== Season summary ==
The Texas Strikers stumbled from the start of the season, dropping 15 consecutive matches. Only a home win over the Tulsa Revolution in their final match allowed them to earn a 1–15 record. The team did not qualify for post-season play.

The Strikers participated in the 2013–14 United States Open Cup for Arena Soccer starting with a bye in the Round of 32 and a Round of 16 game against Austin FC of the Premier Arena Soccer League on January 3, 2014. The Strikers lost that match 4–6, ending their tournament run.

== History ==
The 2012–13 Texas season was the first for the Strikers, Beaumont's first professional soccer team. The team struggled early on but split its final six regular season matches, finishing with a 3–13 record. While they failed to advance to the postseason, the franchise fared better at the box office, placing seventh in the 19-team league for average home attendance in their first year.

== Roster moves ==
The team held a pair of open tryouts in September 2013. One was held in Houston on September 7 at the Southwest Indoor Soccer Center while the other was held September 21 in Beaumont at the Quinn Indoor Soccer Complex.

== Schedule ==
Win Loss

=== Regular season ===
| Game | Day | Date | Kickoff | Opponent | Results | | Location | Attendance |
| Game | Day | Date | Kickoff | Opponent | Score | Record | Location | Attendance |
|---|---|---|---|---|---|---|---|---|
| 1 | Sunday | November 10 | 4:35 pm | at Hidalgo La Fiera | L 1–13 | 0–1 | State Farm Arena | 1,025 |
| 2 | Saturday | November 16 | 7:05 pm | Saltillo Rancho Seco | L 4–5 | 0–2 | Ford Arena | 391 |
| 3 | Saturday | November 23 | 7:05 pm | Monterrey Flash | L 4–13 | 0–3 | Ford Arena | 422 |
| 4 | Saturday | December 7 | 7:05 pm | Hidalgo La Fiera | L 3–14 | 0–4 | Ford Arena | 239 |
| 5 | Friday | December 13 | 7:05 pm | Monterrey Flash | L 2–7 | 0–5 | Ford Arena | 377 |
| 6 | Friday | December 20 | 7:05 pm | at Saltillo Rancho Seco | L 3–10 | 0–6 | Deportivo Rancho-Seco Saltillo | 652 |
| 7 | Saturday | December 21 | 7:05 pm | at Monterrey Flash | L 1–12 | 0–7 | Monterrey Arena | 4,788 |
| 8 | Saturday | December 28 | 6:05 pm | at Tulsa Revolution | L 8–13 | 0–8 | Cox Business Center | 1,007 |
| 9 | Saturday | January 4 | 7:05 pm | Hidalgo La Fiera | L 4–15 | 0–9 | Ford Arena | 214 |
| 10 | Saturday | January 11 | 7:05 pm | Dallas Sidekicks | L 1–15 | 0–10 | Ford Arena | 266 |
| 11 | Saturday | January 18 | 7:05 pm | at Saltillo Rancho Seco | L 4–11 | 0–11 | Deportivo Rancho-Seco Saltillo | 298 |
| 12 | Sunday | January 19 | 5:05 pm | at Monterrey Flash | L 5–15 | 0–12 | Arena Monterrey | 4,789 |
| 13 | Saturday | January 25 | 7:05 pm | at Dallas Sidekicks | L 3–15 | 0–13 | Allen Event Center | 4,238 |
| 14 | Thursday | February 6 | 11:05 am | at Hidalgo La Fiera | L 3–26 | 0–14 | State Farm Arena | 135 |
| 15 | Saturday | February 8 | 7:05 pm | Saltillo Rancho Seco | L 5–8 | 0–15 | Ford Arena | 389 |
| 16 | Saturday | February 15 | 7:05 pm | Tulsa Revolution | W 11–3 | 1–15 | Ford Arena | 277 |

=== U.S. Open Cup for Arena Soccer ===
| Round | Day | Date | Kickoff | Opponent | Results | | Location | Attendance |
| Round | Day | Date | Kickoff | Opponent | Score | Record | Location | Attendance |
|---|---|---|---|---|---|---|---|---|
| Round of 32 | BYE | | | | | | | |
| Round of 16 | Friday | January 3♥ | 8:00 pm | Austin FC (PASL-Premier) | L 4–6 | 0–1 | Cris Quinn Indoor Soccer Complex | |

♥ Postponed from December 14, 2013
