= 2013–14 Saltillo Rancho Seco season =

Saltillo Rancho Seco
2013–14 PASL season
- Owner: Marco Antonio Davila De Leon
- Head Coach: Elizandro Campos
- Arena: Deportivo Rancho-Seco Saltillo; Saltillo, Coahuila
- Highest home attendance: 652 (December 20 vs. Texas Strikers)
- Lowest home attendance: 127 (February 13 vs. Hidalgo La Fiera)
- Average home league attendance: 397 (8 games)

The 2013–14 Saltillo Rancho Seco season was the first international season of the Saltillo Rancho Seco professional indoor soccer club. The Saltillo Rancho Seco, a Central Division team in the Professional Arena Soccer League, played their home games at the newly constructed Deportivo Rancho-Seco Saltillo in Saltillo, the capital of the northern Mexican state of Coahuila. While construction was underway, the team played its first home game on the campus of the Autonomous University of Coahuila.

The team was led by owner/general manager Marco Antonio Davila De Leon and head coach Elizandro Campos with assistant coach Jesus Monroy.

== Season summary ==
The team struggled from the start with a loss to the Monterrey Flash then splitting their next eight games, losing to teams with winning records and beating teams with losing records. Saltillo performed only slightly better at home (3–4) than they did on the road (2–3). 2014 saw Saltillo winning only one game (the hapless Texas Strikers), facing steadily declining attendance at home, and earning a 6–10 record on the season. Only the top three teams in the Central Division qualified for the post-season and Saltillo was mathematically eliminated in late January.

Unlike the 17 US-based PASL teams, Saltillo Rancho Seco and the other two Mexico-based franchises did not participate in the 2013–14 United States Open Cup for Arena Soccer.

== History ==
Saltillo is the third team based in Mexico to join the PASL. For the past three seasons, Saltillo has been a successful member of the Liga Mexicana de Futbol Rápido Profesional (LMFR) and plans to remain a member of both leagues.

== Schedule ==
Win Loss

=== Regular season ===
Game	Day	Date	Kickoff	Opponent	Results		Location	Attendance
Game	Day	Date	Kickoff	Opponent	Score	Record	Location	Attendance
1	Saturday	November 9	6:30pm	Monterrey Flash	L 6–9	0–1	UAdeC Arena	550
2	Saturday	November 16	7:05pm	at Texas Strikers	W 5–4	1–1	Ford Arena	391
3	Sunday	November 17	5:05pm	at Hidalgo La Fiera	L 3–16	1–2	State Farm Arena	2,568
4	Thursday	November 21	8:35pm	at Monterrey Flash	L 5–9	1–3	Monterrey Arena	4,927
5	Friday	December 13	7:05pm	at Tulsa Revolution	W 8–7	2–3	Cox Business Center	864
6	Saturday	December 14	7:05pm	at Dallas Sidekicks	L 3–7	2–4	Allen Event Center	4,140
7	Friday	December 20	7:05pm	Texas Strikers	W 10–3	3–4	Deportivo Rancho-Seco Saltillo	652
8	Saturday	December 21	7:05pm	Ontario Fury	W 16–8	4–4	Deportivo Rancho-Seco Saltillo	537
9	Saturday	January 4	7:05pm	Monterrey Flash	L 3–8	4–5	Deportivo Rancho-Seco Saltillo	500
10	Saturday	January 11	7:05pm	Hidalgo La Fiera	L 1–9	4–6	Deportivo Rancho-Seco Saltillo	316
11	Saturday	January 18	7:05pm	Texas Strikers	W 11–4	5–6	Deportivo Rancho-Seco Saltillo	298
12	Saturday	January 25	7:05pm	San Diego Sockers	L 4–12	5–7	Deportivo Rancho-Seco Saltillo	200
13	Sunday	January 26	7:35pm	at Hidalgo La Fiera	L 3–15	5–8	State Farm Arena	483
14	Saturday	February 8	7:05pm	at Texas Strikers	W 8–5	6–8	Ford Arena	389
15	Thursday	February 13	8:05pm	Hidalgo La Fiera	L 3–6	6–9	Deportivo Rancho-Seco Saltillo	127
16	Sunday	February 16	5:05pm	at Monterrey Flash♥	L 2–10	6–10	Monterrey Arena	5,482

♥ Rescheduled from February 2 at league request.
