= Fair Park Coliseum (Beaumont, Texas) =

Multi-purpose arena in Beaumont, Texas

Coordinates: 32.7788°N 96.7569°W

Fair Park Coliseum was a 7,200-seat, covered, open-sided, multi-purpose arena in Beaumont, Texas. It hosted local sporting events and concerts. It was opened in 1978. At the time of its opening the Fair Park Coliseum was the primary concert venue in the Beaumont area; within a decade, however, demand for concert tickets proved so high that the much larger Montagne Center was built in 1984, only six years after the Coliseum had opened. The Coliseum would then become the Beaumont home of the Ringling Brothers and Barnum and Bailey Circus, Disney on Ice, and Champions on Ice until Ford Arena was built. After significant damage to the coliseum from Hurricane Rita and acquisition of the surrounding property by the Beaumont Housing Authority, the coliseum was demolished. The City of Beaumont awarded a contract for demolition on November 6, 2007.

== See also ==
- Beaumont Civic Center
- Ford Arena
- Ford Park
- Montagne Center
