= Doggett Ford Park =

Arena in Beaumont, Texas

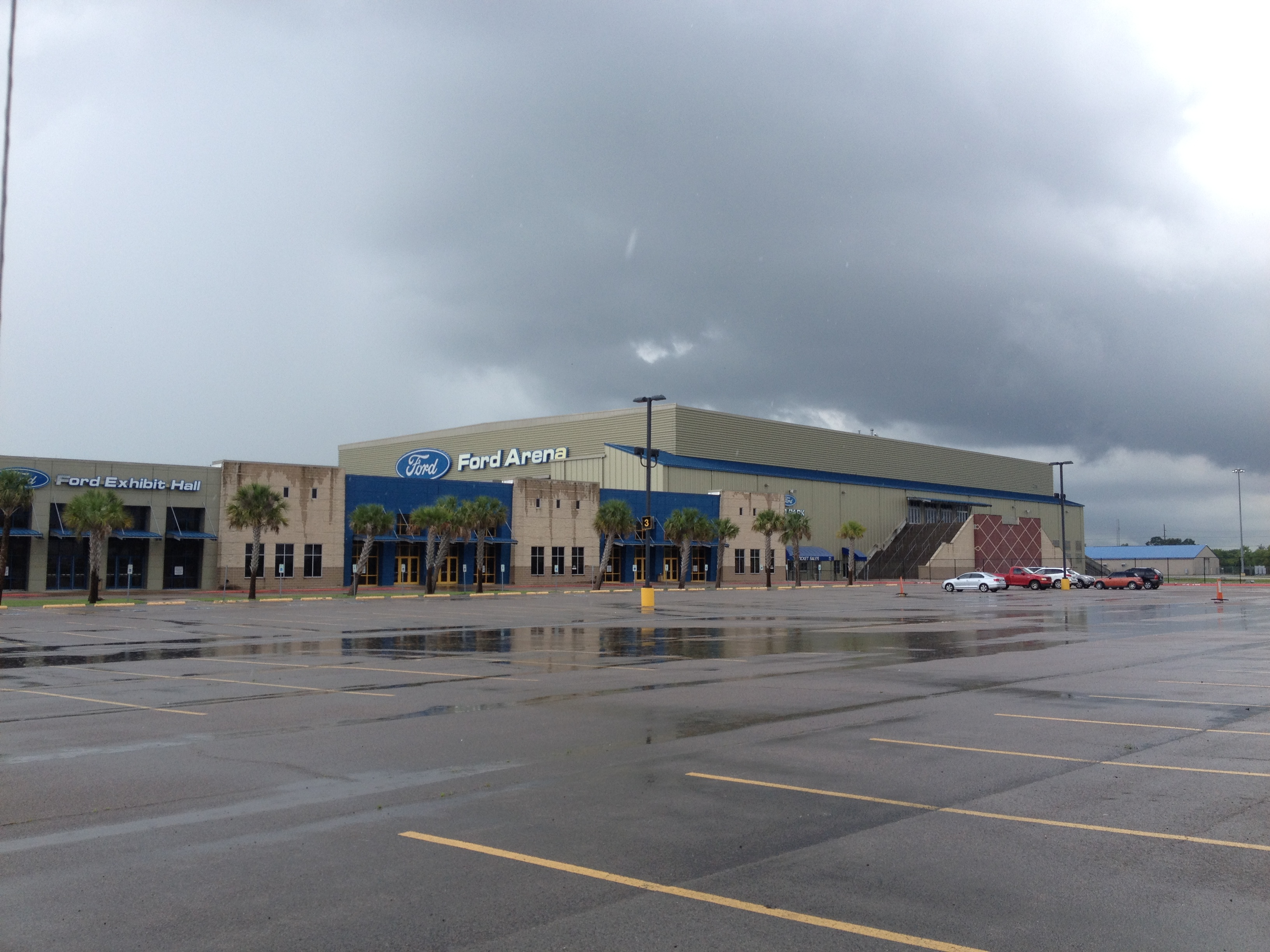
- Interactive map of Doggett Ford Park
- Address: 5115 Interstate 10 South; Beaumont, Texas, 77705; United States
- Coordinates: 30°0′35.6″N 94°10′51.2″W
- Owner: Jefferson County, Texas
- Operator: OVG360
- Capacity: Arena: 9,737; Pavilion: 14,000

Construction
- Opened: 2003
- Cost: $75 million
- Architects: Long Architects, Inc.
- General contractor: Allco Construction LLC.

Website
- Venue Website

Doggett Ford Park is a 221-acre multi-purpose entertainment complex consisting of an arena, exhibit hall, amphitheater, midway, and 12 youth baseball fields located on I-10 South in Beaumont, Texas. The complex opened in 2003. It is owned by Jefferson County, Texas and operated by OVG360, a division of the Oak View Group. It is the home of the South Texas State Fair.

In 2020, Jefferson County began negotiations to sell Ford Park to Renaissance Development Group, which would add a hotel and a horse-racing track to the complex. The deal fell through in 2022 after Renaissance failed to put additional earnest money towards the $22 million sale price.

The Southeast Texas Ford Dealers have held the naming rights to the complex since 2003, a deal which will expire at the end of 2022.

== Facilities ==
- Ford Arena seats 9,737 people. The arena hosts concerts, rodeos, circuses, motorsports, ice shows and many other special events. It was also the former home to several professional teams including the Oxford City FC of Texas (formerly the Texas Strikers) of the Major Arena Soccer League, the Southeast Texas Mavericks ABA franchise, Beaumont Drillers of the NIFL, and the Texas Wildcatters of the ECHL, and the Beaumont Panthers of The Basketball League. It will soon be the home of the Beaumont Renegades, originally members of American Indoor Football.
- Ford Exhibit Hall is a multi-purpose hall for exhibits, trade shows, and more. It has 83,000 feet (25,000 m) of space. The hall includes a 48,000 sq ft dedicated exhibit floor, an 11,000 sq ft lobby/pre-convention space, 8 meeting rooms, 6 loading bays, concession stands, and restrooms.
- Ford Fields are 12 youth softball/baseball fields. The infields are all-weather synthetic turf. Each field has covered seating with protective netting. Also included are 1,000 onsite parking spots, concession stands, and restrooms. Ford Fields served as the home venue for Lamar University's Lamar Lady Cardinals softball team in 2013 and 2014, the first two seasons following restart of the softball program at Lamar.
- Ford Midway is a 9-acre (36,000 m^{2}) midway for fairs, carnivals, and other large outdoor events. The midway includes two free-span livestock show barns.
- Ford Pavilion is an outdoor amphitheater, seats 14,000 people. The pavilion includes 2 star dressing rooms, 2 supporting act dressing rooms, 3 production offices, 7 loading bays, a catering/crew room, parking, restrooms, and concessions.

== See also ==
- Beaumont Civic Center
- Fair Park Coliseum
- Ford Arena
- List of contemporary amphitheatres
- Montagne Center
