= South Texas State Fair =

Annual event in Beaumont, Texas, United States

- Genre: State fair
- Begins: late March – 27 March 2025
- Ends: early April – 06 April 2025
- Frequency: annually
- Venue: I 10
- Locations: Ford Park, Beaumont, TX 77705
- Coordinates: 30°0′35.68″N 94°10′50.78″W
- Country: United States of America
- Years active: 1907–1916, 1919–1941, 1946–2004, 2006–2007, 2009–2019, 2021– (Cancelled 1917–18 – World War I, 1942–1945 – World War II, 2005, 2008 – Hurricane Damage, 2020 – pandemic)
- Founded: 1907
- Founder: City of Beaumont
- Attendance: Estimated 500,000
- Member: Texas Association of Fairs and Events
- Sponsor: Young Men's Business League (YMBL) since 1942
- Website: www.ymbl.org

The South Texas State Fair is an annual regional state fair held in Beaumont, Texas. The fair features a livestock show, a commercial exhibition, and a carnival Midway. Food concessions are a major attraction of the fair. Reflecting Beaumont's location in Southeast Texas, normal carnival foods can be found alongside barbecue, Tex-Mex, and Cajun foods (often including fried alligator).

As of 2009, the South Texas State Fair had an attendance of over 500,000 people, second in the state to the State Fair of Texas in Dallas. The fair is held annually in late March to early April.

Fair patrollers include security guards, the Beaumont, TX Police and Jefferson County, TX Sheriff.

== History ==
The South Texas State Fair traces its roots to the first confirmable fair in Beaumont, held in 1907. With the exception of cancellations in 1917–18, 1942–45, 2005, 2008 & 2020 because of World War I, World War II, Hurricane Rita, Hurricane Ike & COVID-19 pandemic respectively, the fair has continued every year since. It was first known as the Beaumont Fair, then the Southeast Texas State Fair, and in 1921 just the South Texas State Fair. In 1942, operation of the fair was transferred to the YMBL (Young Men's Business League), a local non-profit civic improvement organization.

While other state fairs, including the larger State Fair of Texas, were closed for the duration of World War II, the South Texas State Fair continued as the "YMBL Victory Fair". The YMBL states that this was in part on request from the US military as an attempt to improve morale of soldiers stationed in and near the Beaumont area.

After the war, the fair continued. In 2004, the South Texas State Fair moved from the Beaumont Fairgrounds on the east side of the city to Ford Park on I-10 on the west side.

The 2005 fair was cancelled due to the extensive damage that Hurricane Rita inflicted on the region; It returned in 2006. Due to Hurricane Ike and the hurricane relief staging centered in Ford Park, the 2008 fair was canceled.

The fair resumed in March 2009, marking a permanent schedule change from fall to spring. Reasons stated for the change included better weather, lack of competition from football, and a better fit for midway ride provider Bill Hames Shows.

And 2020 saw cancellation on grounds of COVID-19 pandemic, with next year being delayed to late May.
