= Beaumont Civic Center =

Arena in Beaumont, Texas

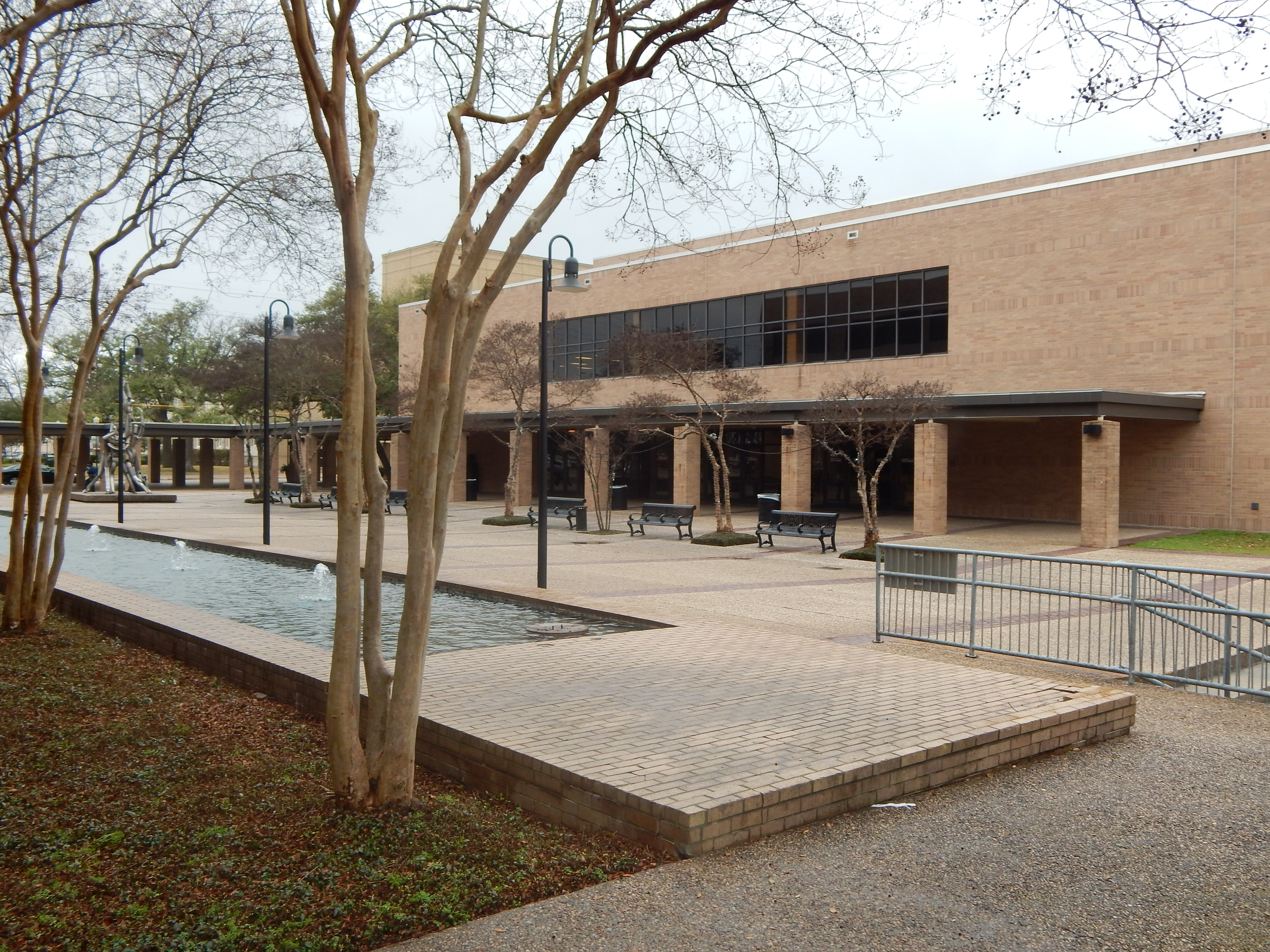
- Interactive map of Beaumont Civic Center
- Location: 701 Main Street, Beaumont, TX
- Coordinates: 30°4′57″N 94°5′42″W
- Owner: City of Beaumont, Texas
- Operator: City of Beaumont, Texas
- Capacity: 6,500; 2,000 for banquets
- Parking: 850 onsite

Tenants
- Lamar Cardinals (NCAA) (1980–1984); Beaumont Drillers (NIFL) (2003)

The Beaumont Civic Center, in downtown Beaumont, Texas, is a 6,500-seat arena where concerts, conventions, trade shows and exhibitions are held. Banquet maximum capacity is 2,000. It has 29,300 square feet (2,720 m^{2}) of ground-level exhibit space and 12,000 square feet (1,100 m^{2}) space on the second level for a combined space of 41,300 square feet (3,840 m^{2}). The building includes four dressing rooms with showers. 850 parking spots are onsite. The venue is part of the Beaumont Civic Center Complex. This complex includes the Civic Center, Julie Rogers Theater and the Jefferson Theatre.

The Civic Center is the temporary home of the Beaumont Children's Museum.

== History ==
=== Home court for Lamar cardinals basketball team (1980–1984) ===
The Beaumont Civic Center was the home court for the Lamar Cardinals basketball men's team for four seasons, from 1980 to 1984. The Cardinals record at the Civic Center was 40–2.

=== Southland Conference men's basketball tournament (1981, 1983, 1984) ===
The Southland Conference men's basketball tournament was held at the Beaumont Civic Center in 1981, 1983, and 1984.

=== 80-game home court winning streak ===
The Lamar Cardinals men's basketball team's eighty (80) game home court winning streak started at McDonald Gym on February 18, 1978. Before the Cardinals moved to their new home at the Beaumont Civic Center, McDonald Gym saw the first thirty-seven (37) straight home wins of the streak. The remaining forty-three (43) straight home court wins of the streak were at the Beaumont Civic Center. When the streak ended on March 10, 1984, the Cardinals were owners of seventh (7th) longest home court winning streak in NCAA history.

Around the Civic Center
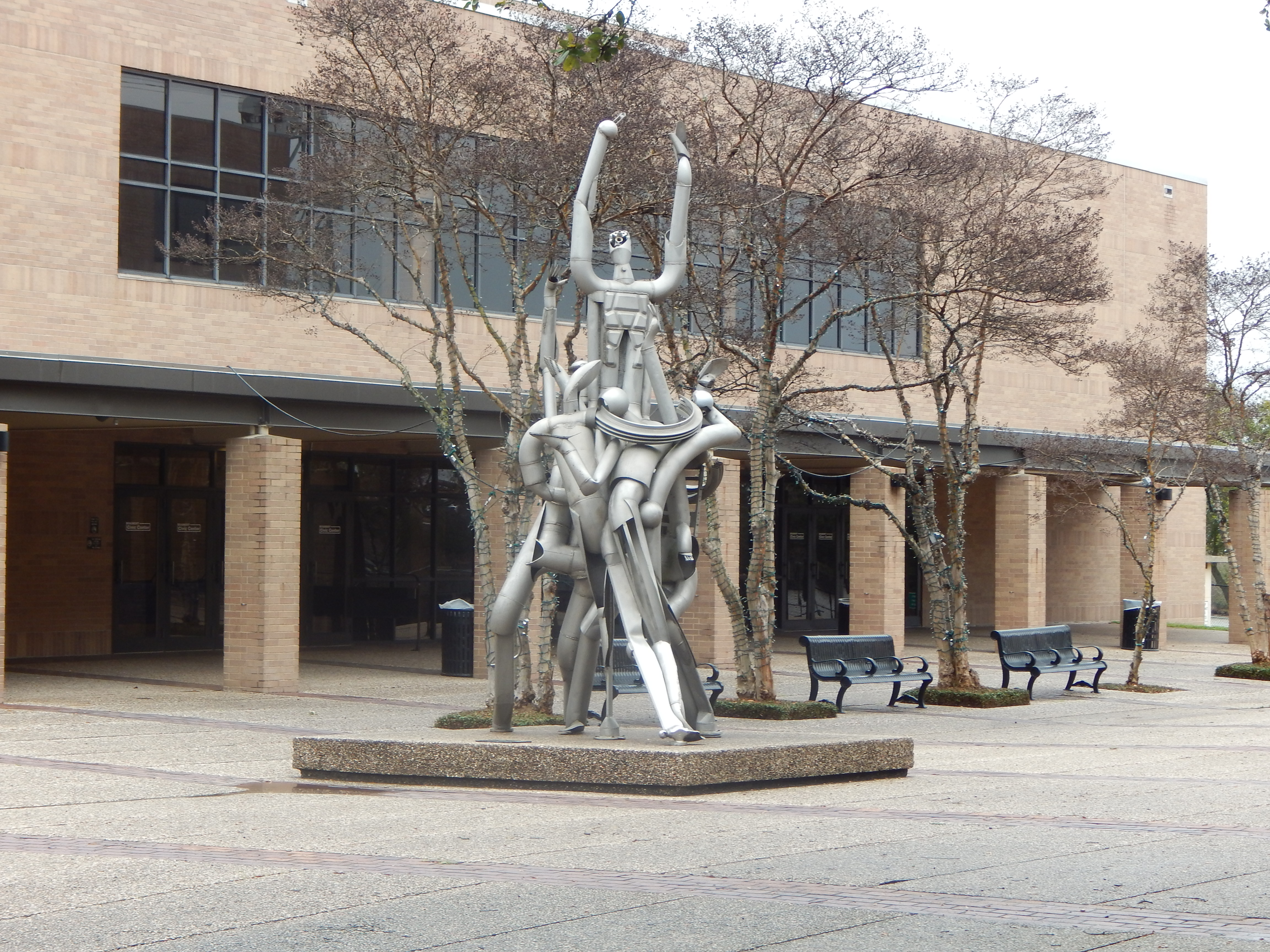
David Cargill sculpture at entrance to Civic Center

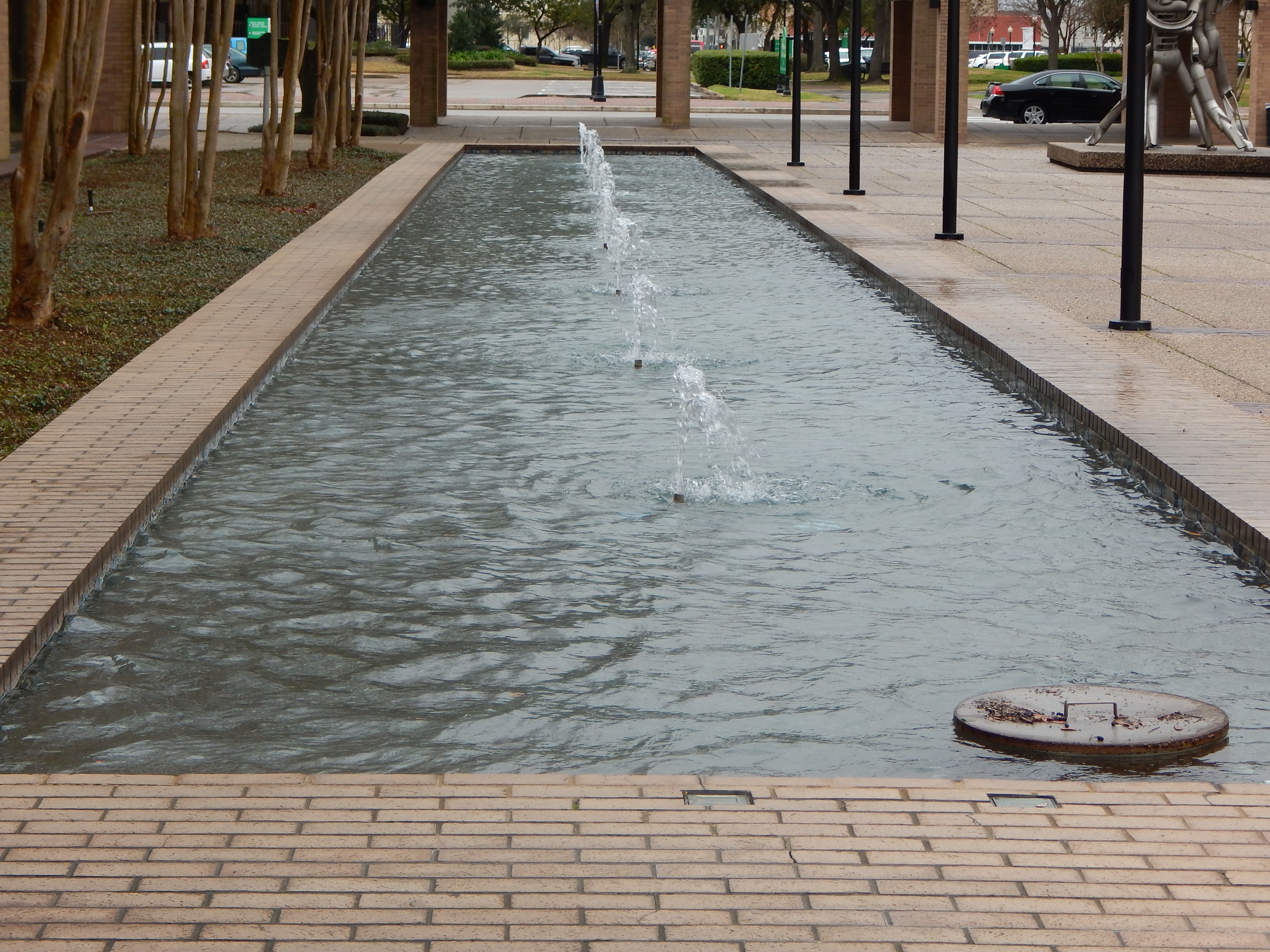
Fountain and reflecting pool at Civic Center entrance plaza

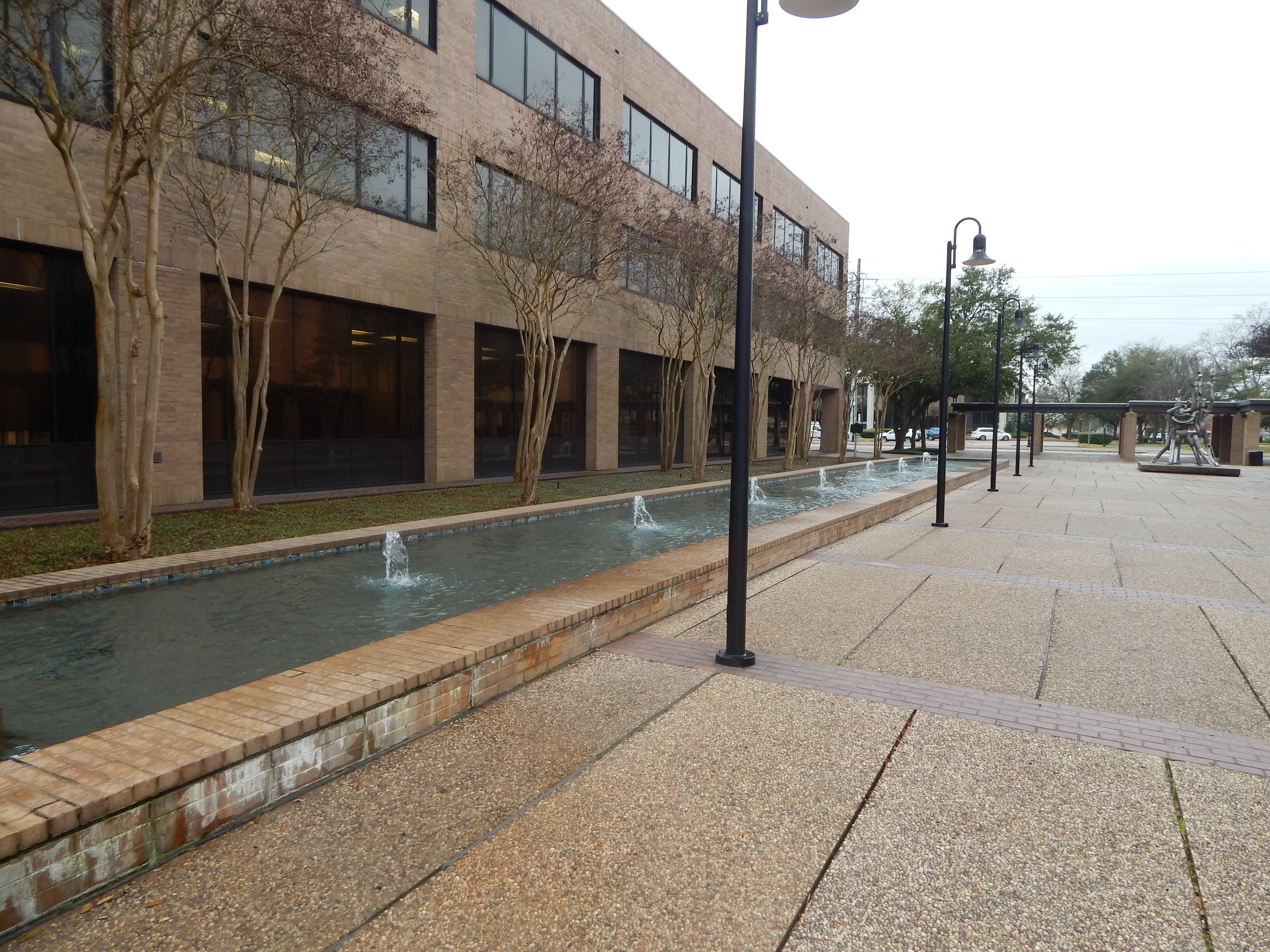
Beaumont City Hall side of the Beaumont Civic Center/City Hall plaza

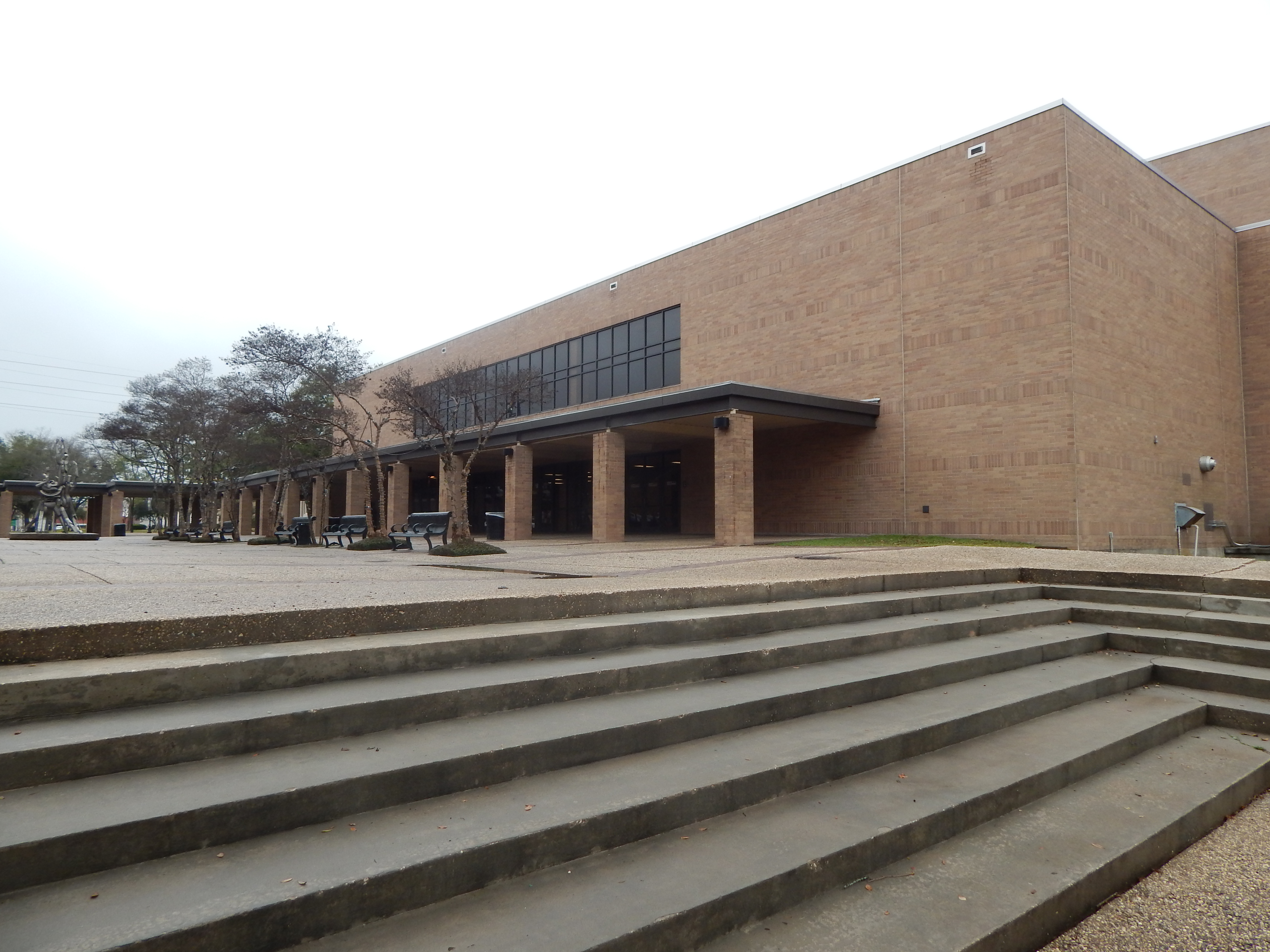
View of Civic Center from steps to Riverfront Park pedestrian underpass

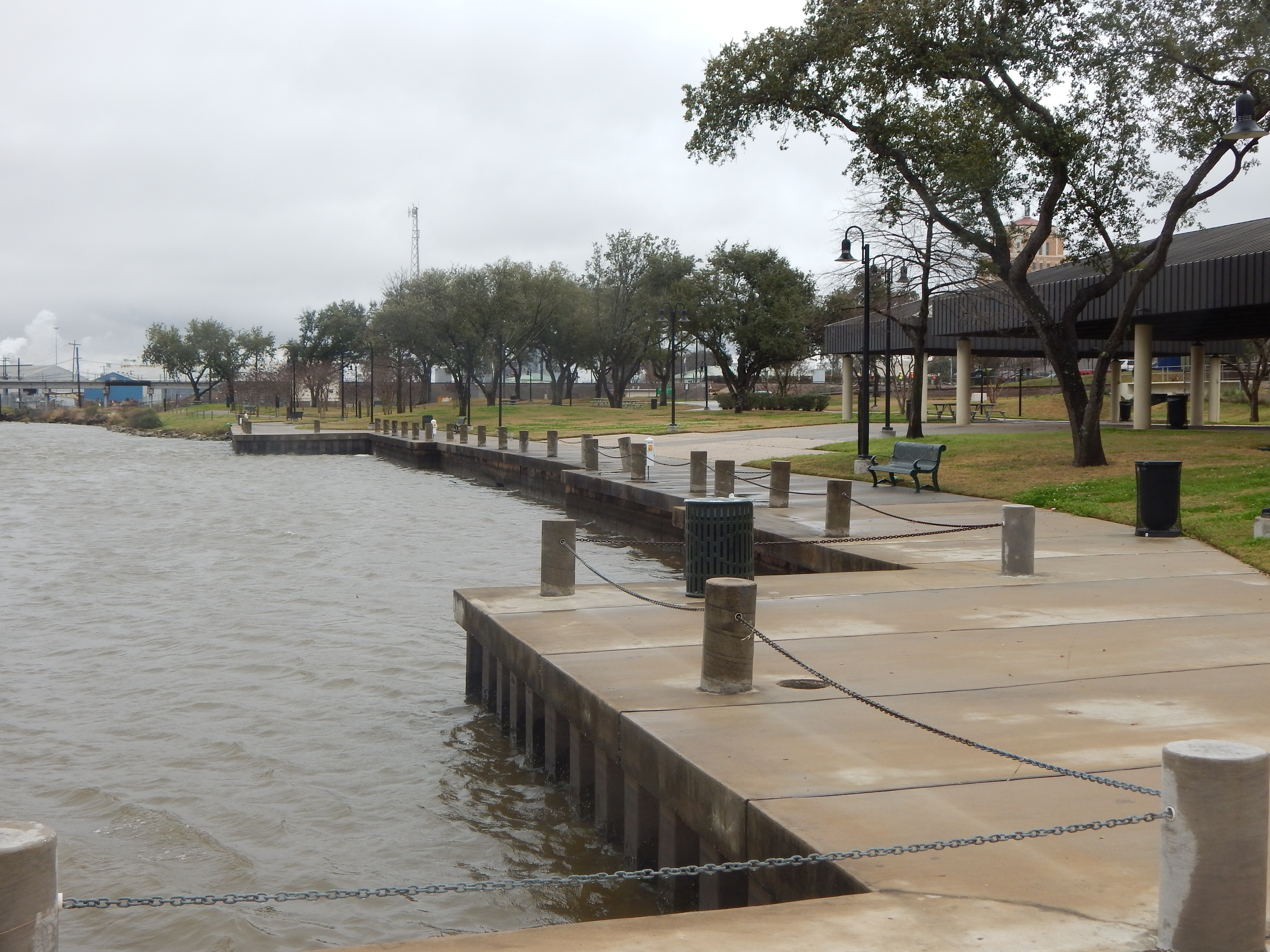
Riverfront Park adjacent to Civic Center

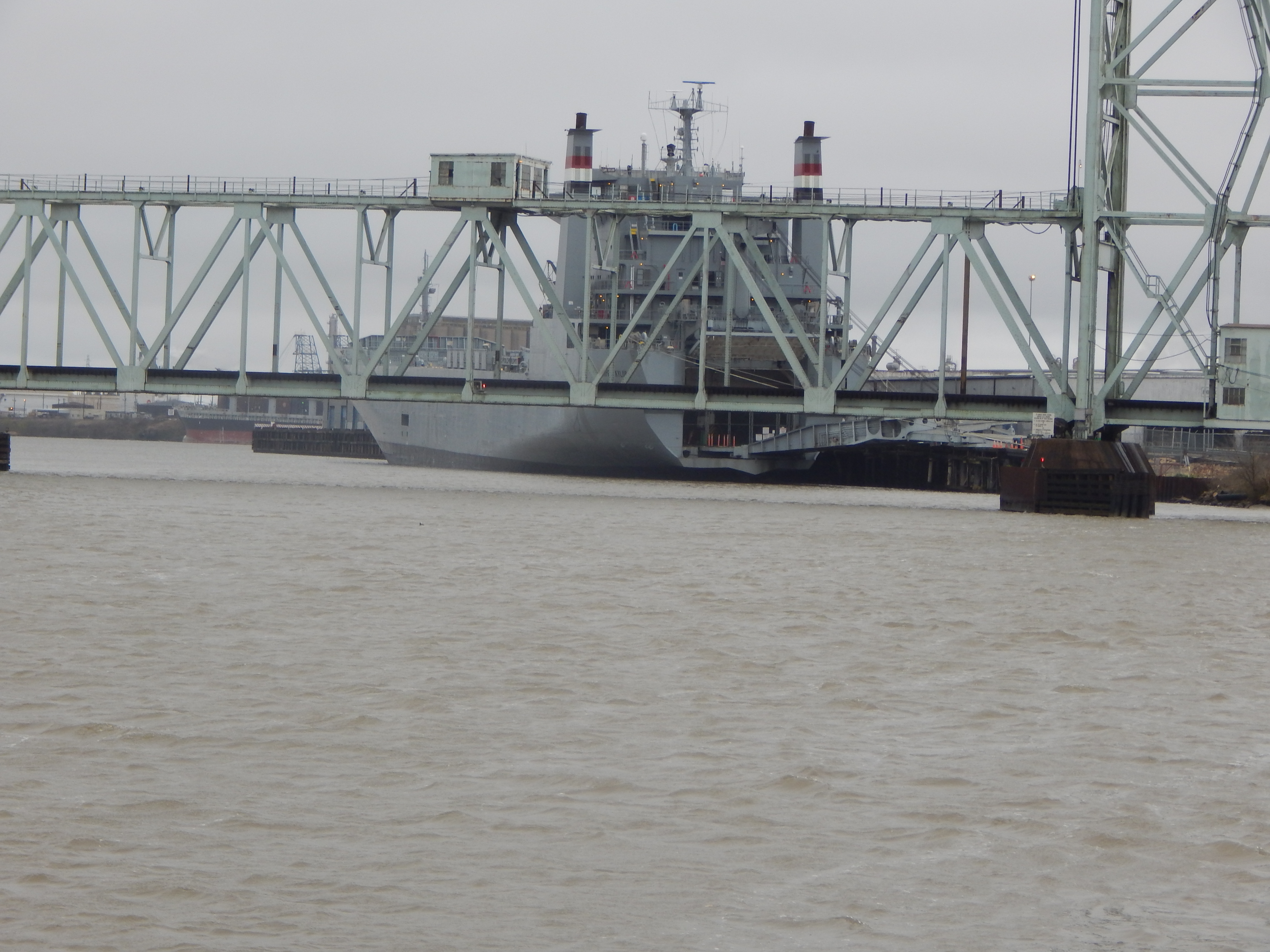
View from Riverfront Park of Roll-on/roll-off (RORO) ship at one of the Port of Beaumont wharves

== See also ==
- Fair Park Coliseum
- Ford Park
- Ford Arena
- Montagne Center
