= Beaumont Renegades =

American indoor football team

Logo

General information
- Headquartered: Ford Arena in Beaumont, Texas
- Colors: Black, Red, White
- BeaumontRenegades.com

Personnel
- Owners: Sam Gordon; Rodney Robichau; Deatrich Wise Jr. Derron Griffin
- General manager: Richard Sickler
- Head coach: Corey Mayfield

Team history
- Beaumont Renegades (2024–present)

Home fields
- Ford Arena (2025–future)

League / conference affiliations
- American Indoor Football (2024, never played); National Arena League (2025); Arena Football One (2026–present)

The Beaumont Renegades are a professional arena football team based in Beaumont, Texas, that competes in Arena Football One (AF1). The team plays its home games at Ford Arena in Doggett Ford Park. They were initially members of American Indoor Football, but went dormant until 2025 where they became members of the National Arena League (which the previous AIF teams had merged with). They won the league's championship in their inaugural season before joining AF1.

== History ==
Original logo (2025)

On September 29, 2023, American Indoor Football announced the addition of the Beaumont Renegades to the league for the 2024. Owners include local favorite Rodney Robichau and Sam Gordon. Robichau served as co-owner and director of business affairs while Gordon served as co-owner, and director of player personnel.

On June 17, 2024, the Renegades announced the hiring of former Houston Texans and Super Bowl champion Baltimore Ravens wide receiver Jacoby Jones as the new head coach after originally being named offensive coordinator in February. On June 28, 2024, the AIF, at the time in the midst of tumult tied to conflicts with the Cedar Rapids River Kings, announced that the Beaumont Renegades were declared "a dormant franchise approved by previous league regimen", yet had invited the team to reapply for membership in the future. Jones unexpectedly died July 14, 2024. and on February 24, 2025 the team hired Corey Mayfield who took over as the new head coach for the team.

On September 10, 2024, the Renegades announced that they were following most of the rest of the AIF's remaining teams and joining the National Arena League.

=== 2025, inaugural championship season ===
After finishing 8–1 in their inaugural season, the Renegades hosted the 2025 NAL Championship game on June 16, 2025, where they shocked the defending champion Omaha Beef 37–29. The Renegades join a small list of teams who won a league championship in their first season.

=== Arena Football One (2026) ===
On August 13, 2025, the Renegades were announced as the newest expansion team for Arena Football One having already left the NAL shortly after winning their championship.
