= Corey Mayfield =

American football player and coach (born 1970)

Beaumont Renegades
- Title: Head coach

Personal information
- Born: February 25, 1970 (age 56); Tyler, Texas, U.S.
- Listed height: 6 ft 3 in (1.91 m)
- Listed weight: 302 lb (137 kg)

Career information
- High school: Lee (Tyler)
- College: Oklahoma
- NFL draft: 1992: 10th round, 269th overall pick

Career history

Playing
- San Francisco 49ers (1992)*; Tampa Bay Buccaneers (1992); New Orleans Saints (1994)*; Jacksonville Jaguars (1995); Pittsburgh Steelers (1997)*; Grand Rapids Rampage (1999–2000); Orlando Rage (2001); Grand Rapids Rampage (2001–2003); Philadelphia Soul (2004); Dallas Desperados (2004–2005)
- * Offseason or practice squad member only

Coaching
- New York Dragons (2005-2007) (STC/DL); East Texas Wranglers (2011); San Antonio Talons (2012) (DC/OL/DL); San Jose SaberCats (2013) (DL); Texas Revolution (2015–?) (DC); Beaumont Renegades (2025–present)

Awards and highlights
- ArenaBowl champion (2001); Alliance Bowl IV champion (2011); AFL All-Rookie Team (1999)

Career NFL statistics
- Tackles: 28
- Sacks: 1.5
- Fumble recoveries: 1
- Stats at Pro Football Reference

Career AFL statistics
- Tackles: 52
- Sacks: 15.5
- Forced fumbles: 3
- Fumbles recovered: 2
- Interceptions: 2
- Stats at ArenaFan.com

Corey Mayfield (born February 25, 1970) is an American former professional football player who was an offensive lineman and defensive lineman in the National Football League (NFL) and Arena Football League (AFL). He played college football for the Oklahoma Sooners. Mayfield is currently the head coach of the Beaumont Renegades of National Arena League (NAL).

== College career ==
Mayfield graduated from the University of Oklahoma with a Bachelor of Arts degree and was a three-year starter. He finished his career with 12 sacks and 88 tackles.

== Professional career ==
Pre-draft measurables
Height	Weight	Arm length	Hand span	40-yard dash	10-yard split	20-yard split	20-yard shuttle	Vertical jump	Broad jump	Bench press
6 ft 2 1/8 in (1.88 m)	280 lb (127 kg)	32 1/2 in (0.83 m)	9 1/8 in (0.23 m)	5.21 s	1.85 s	3.01 s	4.64 s	25.5 in (0.65 m)	8 ft 7 in (2.62 m)	18 reps
All values from NFL Combine

Mayfield was selected by the San Francisco 49ers in the tenth round of the 1992 NFL draft with the 269th overall pick. Mayfield played for the San Francisco 49ers, Tampa Bay Buccaneers, Jacksonville Jaguars, Grand Rapids Rampage, Orlando Rage, Philadelphia Soul and the Dallas Desperados.

== Coaching career ==
Mayfield began his coaching career as an assistant with the Dallas Desperados. He served as the defensive line coach/co-special teams coordinator for the New York Dragons and head coach of the East Texas Wranglers of the Independent Indoor Football Alliance.

== Personal life ==
Mayfield is the father of Corey Mayfield Jr., a cornerback who signed with the Baltimore Ravens in the 2023 NFL offseason.
