= 2012–13 Texas Strikers season =

Texas Strikers
2012–13 PASL season
- Owner: James Germany
- Head Coach: Chris "Topper" Cogan
- Arena: Ford Arena; Beaumont, Texas (capacity: 8,500)
- PASL: 5th, Central
- US Open Cup: DNP
- Highest home attendance: 1,078 (December 1, 2012) vs Dallas Sidekicks
- Lowest home attendance: 385 (January 11, 2013) vs Chicago Mustangs
- Average home league attendance: 598 (over 8 home games)

The 2012–13 Texas Strikers season was the first season of the Texas Strikers professional indoor soccer club. The Strikers, a Central Division team in the Professional Arena Soccer League, played their home games in Ford Arena in Beaumont, Texas. The team was led by owner James Germany and head coach Chris "Topper" Cogan. The Strikers are Beaumont's first professional soccer team.

== Season summary ==
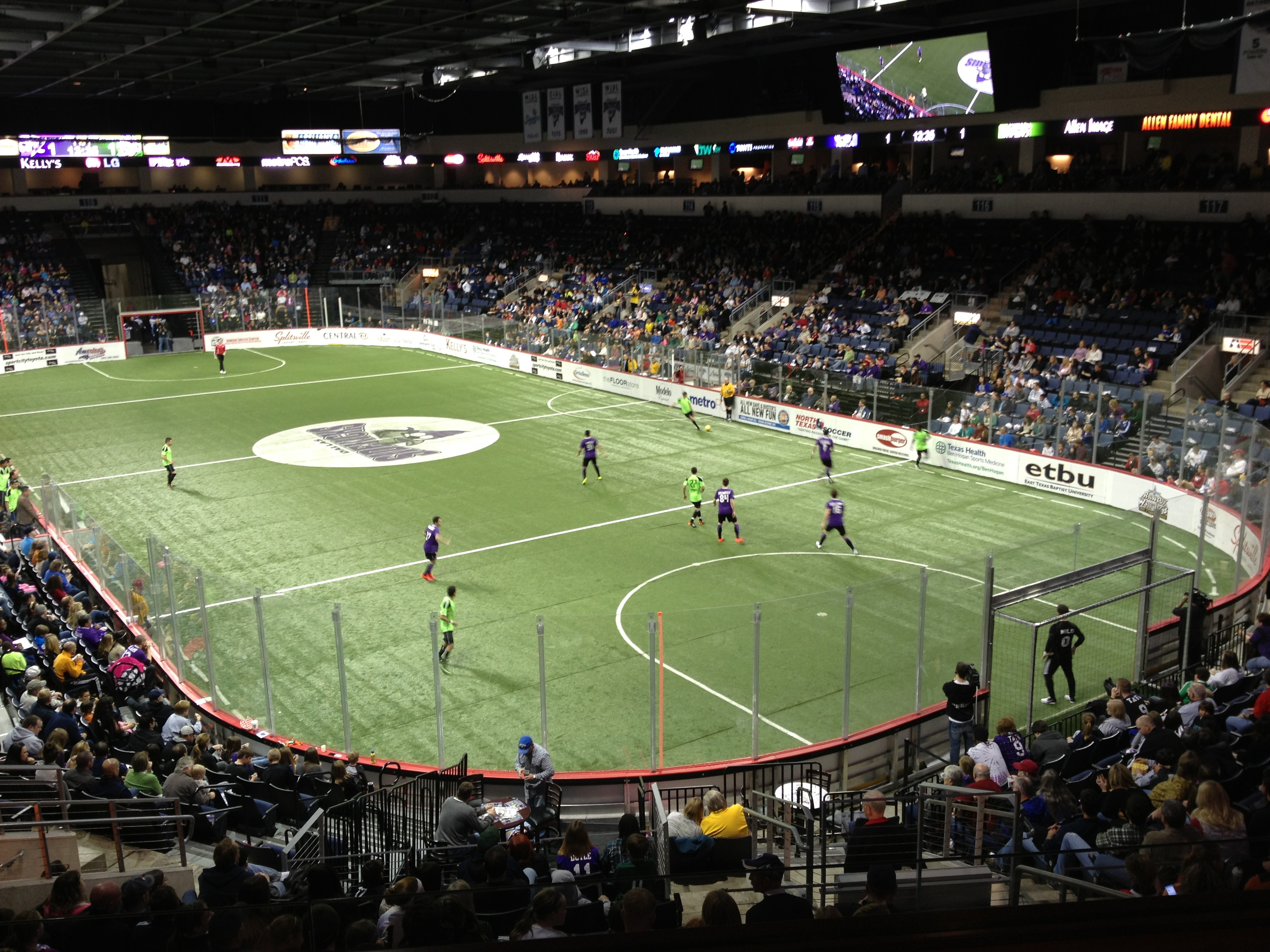
The Strikers in action versus the Dallas Sidekicks on February 23, 2013, at the Allen Event Center.

The team struggled early in the regular season but split its last six games, amassing a 3–13 record. The Strikers placed fifth in the five-team Central Division and failed to advance to the postseason. The franchise fared better at the box office, placing seventh in the 19-team league for average home attendance.

The Strikers did not participate in the 2012–13 United States Open Cup for Arena Soccer.

== Off-field moves ==
The team's December 1, 2012, home opener against the Dallas Sidekicks was delayed by nearly two hours as the goals had not been properly installed by gametime. Blaming late shipping from the supplier for the delay, the team gave free popcorn and soft drinks to fans while they waited. The team later announced that anyone with a ticket stub from the delayed game could redeem it for free admission to the December 8 game against the Arizona Storm.

== Roster moves ==
In early October 2012, the Strikers held two rounds of tryouts for prospective players at the Cris Quinn Soccer Complex in Beaumont. 63 prospects participated in the tryouts as the team worked to fill out a 20-man roster for the 2012–13 season.

On October 30, the team signed Thomas Shenton from Doncaster, England, Mikey Olabarrieta from Honduras, and Texas native Jeff LeBlanc.

The team roster for the regular season finale against the Dallas Sidekicks was partially filled out with players from Vitesse Dallas of the Premier Arena Soccer League.

== Schedule ==
Win Tie Loss

=== Regular season ===
Game	Day	Date	Kickoff	Opponent	Results		Location	Attendance
Game	Day	Date	Kickoff	Opponent	Final score	Record	Location	Attendance
1	Saturday	November 17	7:30pm	at Rio Grande Valley Flash	L 1–13	0–1	State Farm Arena	1,758
2	Saturday	December 1	7:05pm	Dallas Sidekicks	L 3–10	0–2	Ford Arena	1,078
3	Saturday	December 8	7:05pm	Arizona Storm	L 4–7	0–3	Ford Arena	717
4	Saturday	December 15	7:00pm	at Dallas Sidekicks	L 1–21	0–4	Allen Event Center	4,768
5	Saturday	December 22	7:05pm	at Rockford Rampage	L 5–16	0–5	Victory Sports Complex	266
6	Sunday	December 23	1:30pm	at Chicago Mustangs	L 1–20	0–6	Grand Sports Arena	299
7	Saturday	December 29	7:05pm	Dallas Sidekicks	L 4–16	0–7	Ford Arena	688
8	Friday	January 4	7:05pm	Rio Grande Valley Flash	L 1–10	0–8	Ford Arena	496
9	Friday	January 11	7:05pm	Chicago Mustangs	L 2–12	0–9	Ford Arena	385
10	Saturday	January 19	8:00pm (9:00pm Central)	at Real Phoenix	L 6–10	0–10	Barney Family Sports Complex	69
11	Sunday	January 20	4:00pm (5:00pm Central)	at Arizona Storm	W 9–8	1–10	Arizona Sports Complex	55
12	Sunday	January 27	5:00pm	at Rio Grande Valley Flash	L 3–12	1–11	State Farm Arena	1,549
13	Saturday	February 2	7:05pm	Real Phoenix ♥	W 13–8	2–11	Ford Arena	398
14	Sunday	February 10	3:05pm	Rockford Rampage	W 9–8	3–11	Ford Arena	409
15	Saturday	February 16	7:05pm	Rio Grande Valley Flash	L 10–11 (OT)	3–12	Ford Arena	620
16	Saturday	February 23	7:00pm	at Dallas Sidekicks	L 4–10	3–13	Allen Event Center	4,856

♥ Replacement squad after Phoenix franchise revoked by league.
