= Montagne Center =

Events centre in Beaumont, Texas

Neches Federal Credit Union Arena at the Montagne Center
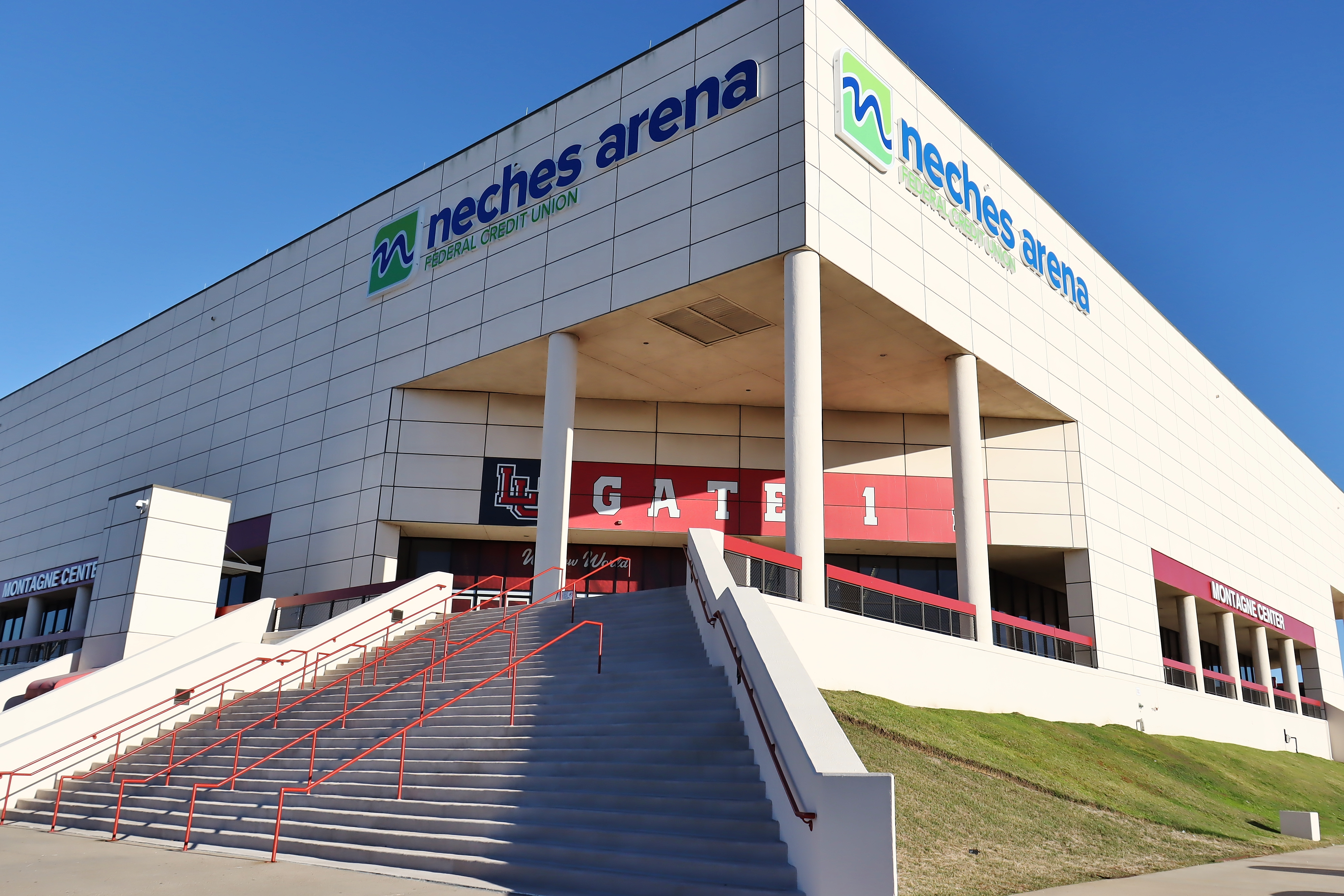
- Interactive map of Neches Federal Credit Union Arena at the Montagne Center
- Location: 4400 Martin Luther King Jr. Parkway; Beaumont, Texas 77710
- Coordinates: 30°2′38″N 94°4′15″W
- Owner: Lamar University
- Operator: Lamar University
- Capacity: Maximum: 10,746; Basketball: 10,080 (Permanent seating: 8,102 and telescopic chairback seating system: 1,978)
- Executive suites: Red Room: 20 to 150; Morgan Suites: 7 suites with 16 seats each (face football field)
- Surface: Multi-surface
- Record attendance: Men's Game: 10,010 (on January 10, 1987 vs McNeese State Cowboys); Women's Game: 9,143 (on March 17, 1991 vs LSU Lady Tigers)

Construction
- Groundbreaking: June 20, 1983
- Built: June 20, 1983–November 1984
- Opened: November 24, 1984
- Renovated: 2005, 2008 (Major repairs due to Hurricanes Rita and Ike)
- Expanded: 1985
- Cost: $12.5 million ($38.7 million in 2025 dollars)
- Architect: LaBiche Architectural Group
- Structural engineer: Walter P Moore

Tenants
- Lamar Cardinals men's basketball Lamar Cardinals women's basketball

Website
- Montagne Center

Neches Federal Credit Union Arena at the Montagne Center, built in 1984, is a mixed-use event center that houses a 10,746-seat a multi-purpose arena and a variety of event spaces in Beaumont, Texas. The Montagne Center was designed especially for the basketball program with a wing designated for instructional purposes. The Montagne Center is currently home to the Lamar University Cardinals, the Lady Cardinals basketball teams, and the Lamar University Pathway Program, Lamar University's language program. The arena was previously the home of the Lady Cardinals volleyball team until renovations to McDonald Gym were completed in 2006–07. The Montagne's instructional area has been home to Lamar's language program since 2010 when the Lamar Language Institute (LLI) first moved there, then transitioned to TIEP at Lamar in 2011, and became the Lamar University Language Program (LUPP) in 2017.

== Features ==
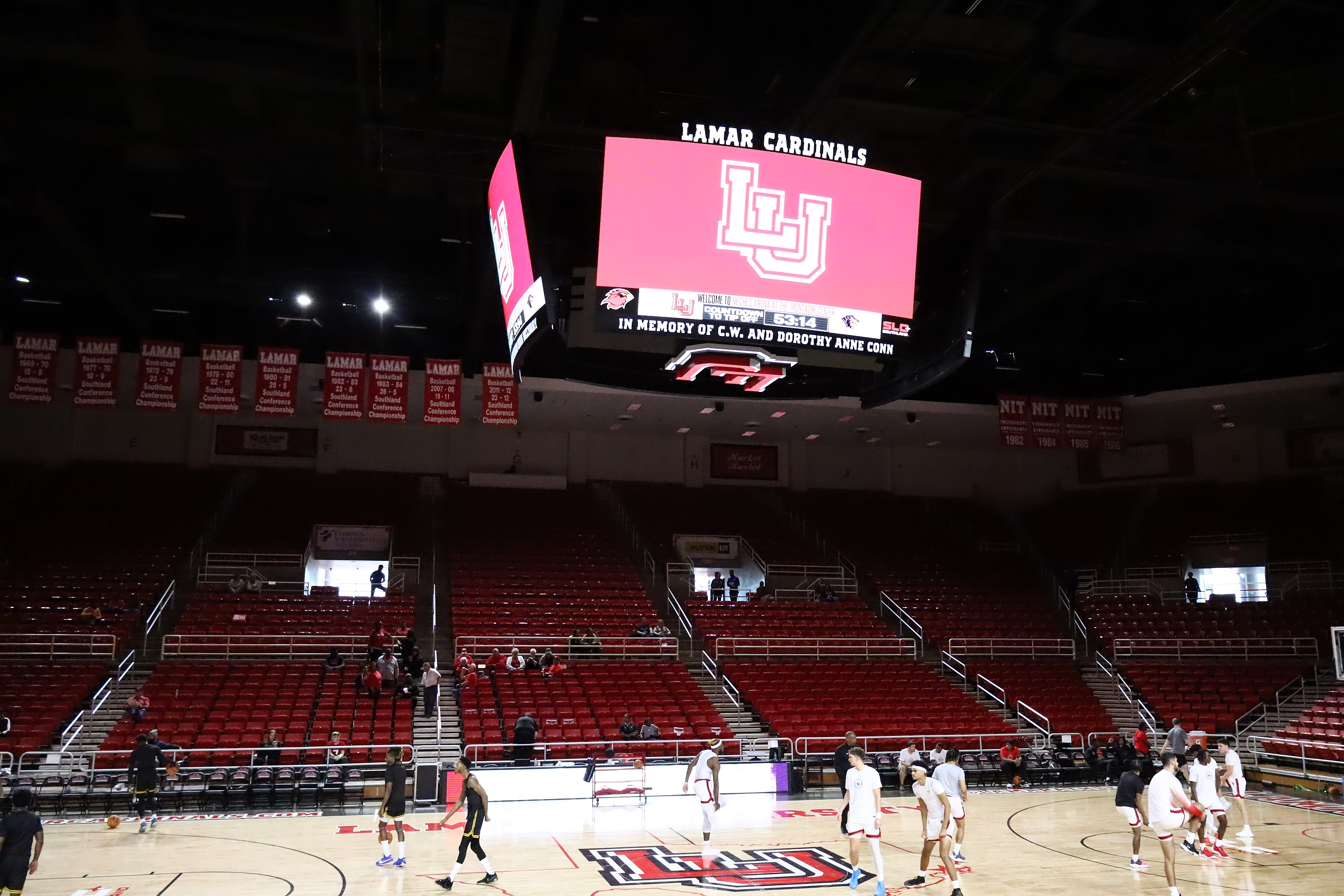
Interior of the arena in 2023.

The Montagne Center is a mixed-use facility with a split funding arrangement, as required by state statute. Much of the center is devoted to sports and special events; a wing of the center is devoted to education.

The Sports & Events Center

After one year of operation, the arena's seating capacity was expanded from 8,000 in basketball configuration to its current seating capacity of 10,080. The 10,080 capacity is made up of 8,102 permanent seats and a telescopic chairback seating system totaling 1,978 seats. All seats in the arena are chairbacked and all are cushioned with the exception of folding back seats in the four topmost rows of seats. Including floor seating, the arena has a maximum capacity of 10,746 in event configuration. The arena was named Neches Federal Credit Union Arena in 2023 in return for a $3.5 million donation by Neches Federal Credit Union. Naming rights to the arena extend to December 31, 2033.

The arena floor can host sporting events including basketball, volleyball, wrestling, boxing and martial arts tournaments. With stadium and floor seating, the Montagne Center can be configured for hosting concert events. The arena floor (which can be expanded to 165' x121') can also be transformed into hosting graduation ceremonies, proms, dances, banquets and conferences.

The Morgan Suites and Red Room are both sports suites housed in the Montagne. The Morgan suites face the football field and are priced at $25,000 a year. Each of the seven suites has seating for 16. The Red Room is a university reception center for alumni and reunion events. The Red Room is unique because one side has windows facing the North end of the Football field while the other side faces the basketball court.

The building includes the following in addition to the main arena area:

- Offices
- Two perimeter courts
- President's Suite/Red room - With almost 1,400 sq ft of event space located on the fifth floor of the facility, along with a pristine view of both Provost Umphrey Stadium and Billy & Pat Tubbs Court, it is the ideal location for presidential receptions. The room can comfortably seat fifty (50) guests in a banquet-style setting, or up to seventy-five (75) guests in a reception-style format. Complete with a built-in wet bar, private restrooms, two (2) plasma televisions, the President's Suite truly provides a VIP experience for its guests.
- Cardinal Club Room - A 3,442 sq ft event space with the room to comfortably hold up to one hundred and twenty-eight (128) guests in banquet-style seating or one hundred and eighty (180) guests in a reception-style arrangement. The room features a built-in kitchenette for food preparation and storage, serving bar, in-room public address system with lectern, and two (2) plasma screen televisions.
- Morgan Suites - 7 suites with 16 seats each. The Morgan Suites face Provost Umphrey Stadium.
- Player's lounge
- Study area

Educational Area

The educational wing houses the Lamar University Pathway Program, is located on the ground floor of the Montagne Center and contains a variety of instructional space designated to serve domestic and international students and ESOL teacher development. Language contains 5 modern equipped classrooms, a computer lab/classroom, office and conference suite, and student lounge.

- Classrooms - Each classroom is equipped with a projectors, screen, and computer, a whiteboard, wife-fii internet, and 26 student seats. The computer lab/classroom offers 15 computer stations as well as 16 student desk.
- Faculty offices - The office and conference areas house seven faculty offices as well as reception, meeting, and work areas. This wing can facilitate the instruction of more than 6100 individuals per week.
- Student lounge - The student lounge offers snack and beverage machines, sofas and chairs, as well as a large table for students to study or eat at.

Lamar University Pathway Program (LUPP) offers three language programs through domestic and international collaborations.

== Annual events ==
- English as a Second Language (ESL) classes for professional development
- English as a Second Language (ESL) classes for academic purposes
- Lamar University and LIT Graduation
- Local High School Graduations
- Men's and Women's Basketball Games
- Volleyball matches
- Gusher Marathon
- Basketball and Football banquets
- Lamar Athletic Banquet
- WWE
- Cirque du Soleil
- Champions on Ice
- Major concert tours

== Other notable features ==
On February 19, 2011, during halftime Billy Tubbs was honored by Lamar with the naming of the Montagne Center basketball court in his and his wife's honor. The court was named the "Billy & Pat Tubbs Court". During the same halftime ceremony Lamar also honored Billy's 78-79 Cardinal squad the first team in Lamar University history to advance to the NCAA tournament.

A small piece of the 2015 NCAA Men's Division I Basketball Tournament East Regional – Syracuse, New York is now part of the Montagne Center. The goals used in the Syracuse Regional were moved to and installed in the Montagne Center in April 2015.

== Recovery from Hurricanes Rita and Ike ==
The Montagne Center received significant damage from both Hurricane Rita (September 24, 2005) and Hurricane Ike (September 13, 2008). According to a November 2005 issue of the Cardinal Cadence, Lamar University's Alumni magazine, Rita severely damaged the roof leaving gaping holes. Exterior tiles around the building were blown out leaving the arena area exposed. Also, the mezzanine entrances were destroyed. Hurricane Ike, striking three years later, also did significant damage to the center. According to an October 2008 issue of the Cardinal Cadence, exterior tiles again were blown out and the roof was damaged. Additionally, glass walls gave way.

== Improvements ==
- 2015 - The basketball court was refurbished featuring a new center court logo. The basketball goals were replaced. The new goals were used in the East Regional of the 2015 NCAA Division I men's tournament at Syracuse University's Carrier Dome.
- 2016 – Four sided center hung video scoreboard, LED scorer's table, 2 auxiliary team names scoreboards, end of period lights, locker room clocks, 3 sided slim shot clocks as well as sound system upgrades The four sided center hung video scoreboard has four 6mm video display panels with 10mm video display rings above and below. Each display panel is 11 feet wide and the display provides 1.3 million pixels. The scorer's table provides 30' of 10mm LED display. According to an October 27, 2016 article in the Beaumont Enterprise, total cost of the 2016 upgrades was $1.261 million. Susan Conn McCurry provided a major donation toward the new equipment.
- 2018 – Susan Conn McCurry donated $500,000 toward men's and women's locker room renovations. The renovations were scheduled to start in March, 2018. Project cost through August, 2018 was at least $666,479.00. Alpha Building Corporation was the general contractor, and PDG Architects was the architectural firm for the project.

== Attendance ==
=== Top 10 attendance marks ===
Below is a list of the Cardinals 10 best-attended games men's* home games (all at the Montagne Center).

Rk.	Date	Opponent	Attendance
Top 10 Attendance
1	January 10, 1987	McNeese State	10,010
2	February 27, 1986	McNeese State	9,467
3	December 16, 1985	LSU	9,432
4	January 24, 1987	Arkansas State	8,992
5	March 15, 1985	Houston	8,610
6	December 27, 1995	Texas	8,454
7	February 23, 2008	Northwestern St.	8,338
8	January 26, 1985	Louisiana Tech	8,317
9	March 20, 1985	Chattanooga	8,245
10	November 26, 1985	Villanova	8,216

As of the 2018–19 season.
*Note: Record home attendance for a Lady Cardinals game at the Montagne Center of 9,143 was on March 17, 1991, vs the LSU Lady Tigers.

=== Yearly attendance ===
Below is a list of the attendance by year since the Cardinals moved into the Montagne Center.

Season	Average	High
Yearly Attendance
2022–23	1,853	2,620
2021–22	2,221	3,532
2020–21	1,282	2,359*
2019–20	2,256	4,254
2018–19	2,356	5,218
2017–18	1,560	2,196
2016–17	1,890	2,774
2015–16	1,776	2,312
2014-15	2,173	3,543
2013-14	2,170	3,984
2012-13	2,664	6,059
2011-12	2,834	5,138
2010-11	3,176	5,083
2009-10	2,970	4,675
2008-09	3,673	6,182
2007-08	3,704	8,338
2006-07	3,579	7,497
2005-06	3,269	5,173
2004-05	3,986	6,164
2003-04	4,063	5,347
2002-03	3,338	4,537
2001-02	2,670	4,147
2000-01	2,768	5,033
1999-2000	3,704	6,271
1998-99	3,382	6,193
1997-98	4,442	7,584
1996-97	2,638	5,089
1995-96	2,822	8,454
1994-95	2,294	4,142
1993-94	2,987	3,876
1992-93	3,861	8,033
1991-92	3,602	5,642
1990-91	5,437	7,641
1989-90	1,629	2,932
1988-89	4,562	6,615
1987-88	4,562	7,504
1986-87	6,615	10,010
1985-86	6,326	9,467
1984-85	6,306	8,310

* Fall 2020 attendance limited to 25% capacity due to COVID19 precautions.
As of the 2021–22 season.

== Photo gallery ==
Montagne Center
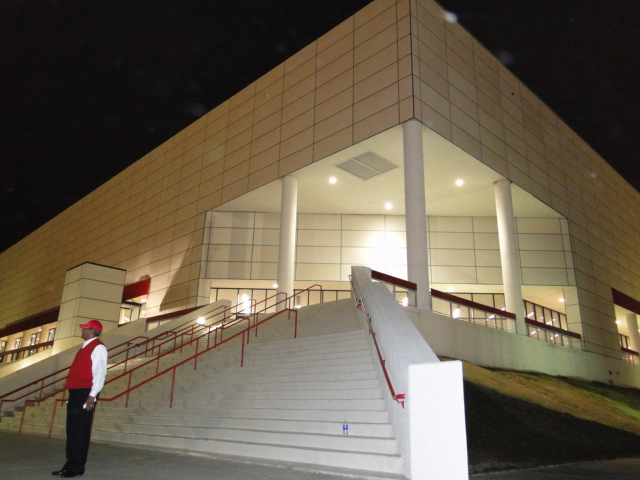
Montagne Center at night

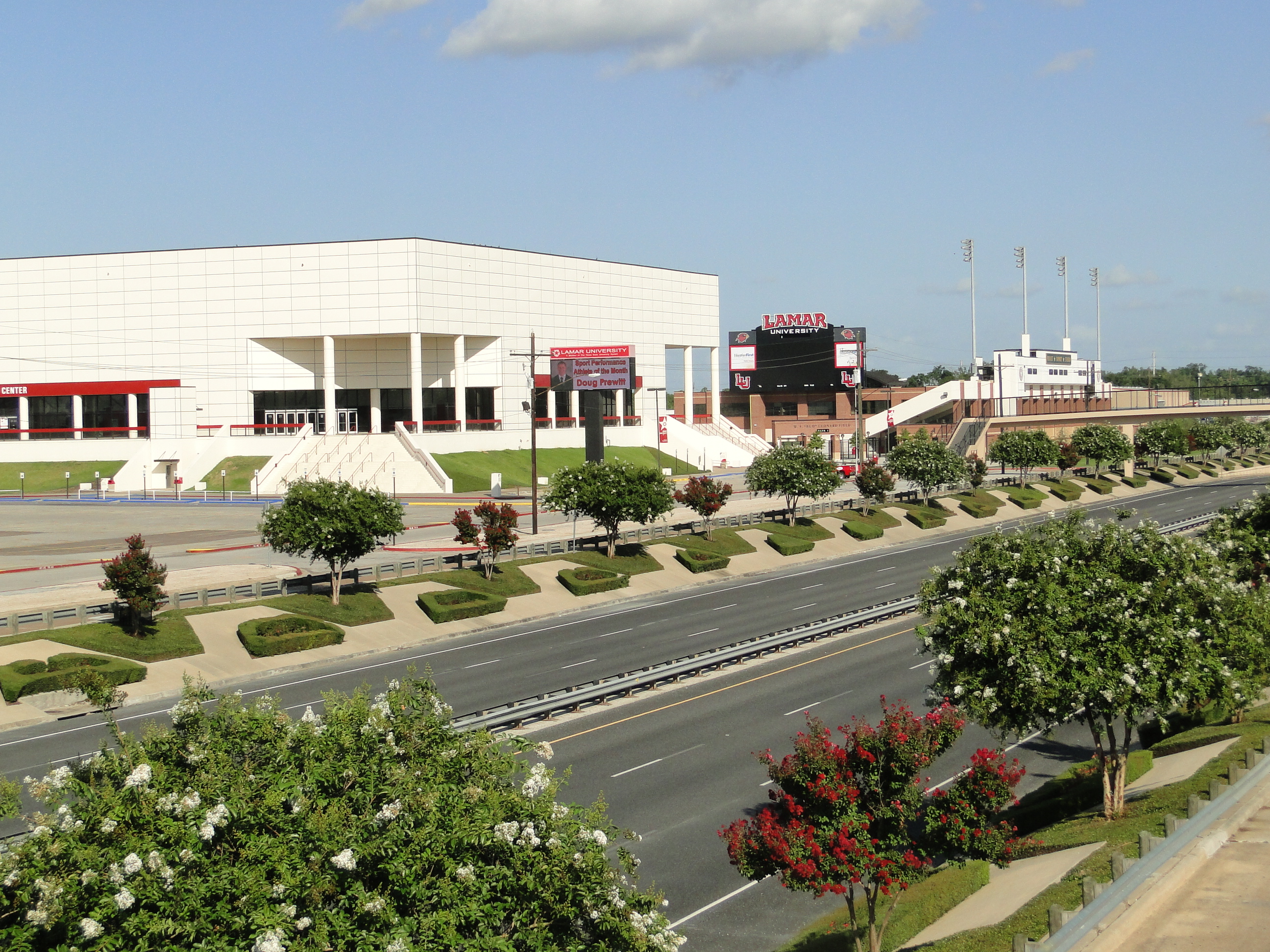
Montagne Center and Provost Umphrey Stadium in the distance as seen from MLK Pkwy crosswalk

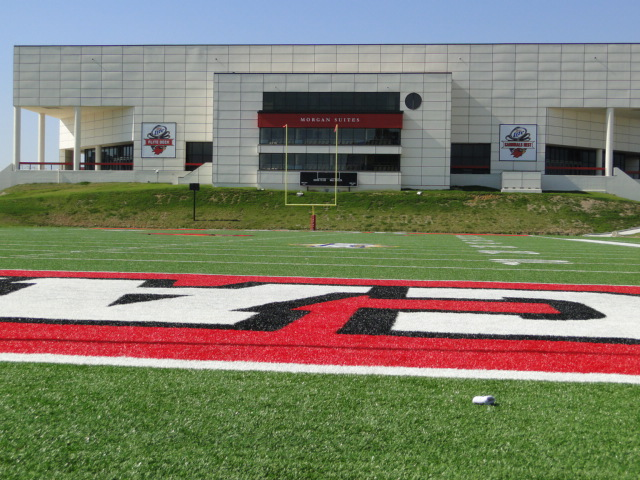
Montagne Center and Morgan Suites at Provost Umphrey

== See also ==
- Ford Arena
- Ford Park
- Beaumont Civic Center
- McDonald Gym
- List of NCAA Division I basketball arenas
