= Saltillo Rancho Seco =

- Founded: 2011
- Stadium: Deportivo Rancho-Seco Saltillo; Saltillo, Coahuila
- Capacity: 2,200
- Owner: Marco Antonio Davila De Leon
- Head Coach: Elizandro Campos
- League: LMFR; MASL
- 2015–16: 4th, Southern Division; Playoffs: DNQ
- Website: http://www.deportivoranchoseco.com.mx

Saltillo Rancho Seco is a Mexican professional indoor soccer team based in Saltillo, the capital of the northern Mexican state of Coahuila. Since 2011, Saltillo has been a member of the Liga Mexicana de Futbol Rápido Profesional (LMFR) and in November 2013 began play in the Central Division of the Professional Arena Soccer League (PASL). With the PASL's absorption of 6 former MISL teams, the league changed its name to the Major Arena Soccer League and the team moved to the new Southern division.

After three successful seasons in the Liga Mexicana de Futbol Rápido Profesional, Saltillo became the third team from Mexico to join the PASL. The team remains a member of both leagues. The team plays home games at the purpose-built Deportivo Rancho-Seco Saltillo but began league play on the campus of the Autonomous University of Coahuila while construction was underway.

The team is owned by Marco Antonio Davila De Leon.

== History ==
Under the direction of head coach Elizandro Campos and assistant coach Jesus Monroy, the Central Division team struggled from the start with a loss to the Monterrey Flash then split their next eight games, losing to teams with winning records and beating teams with losing records. Saltillo won only one game in 2014, faced steadily declining attendance at home, and earned a 6–10 record on the season, missing the Professional Arena Soccer League post-season.

Moving to the new Southern Division of the re-branded Major Arena Soccer League, Saltillo will face the Missouri Comets and Las Vegas Legends on the road while their other 18 games will be against opponents based in Texas and Mexico.

== Year-by-year ==
League champions	Runners-up	Division champions	Playoff berth

Year	League	Reg. season	GF	GA	Finish	Playoffs	Avg. attendance
2013–14	PASL	6–10	91	132	5th, Central	Did not qualify	397
2014–15	MASL	2–17	121	201	5th, Southern	Did not qualify	503
2015–16	MASL	7–13	150	170	4th, Southwest	Did not qualify	183
