= Oxford City FC of Texas =

Oxford City Football Club of Texas
- Founded: 2012 (as Texas Strikers)
- Dissolved: 2015
- Ground: Ford Arena; Beaumont, Texas
- Capacity: 6,500
- League: Major Arena Soccer League
- 2014–15: 3rd, Southern Division; Playoffs: Division semifinals
- Website: http://oxfordcityfctexas.com/
Home colors

Oxford City FC of Texas was an American professional indoor soccer team based in Beaumont, Texas. The team joined the Professional Arena Soccer League on September 26, 2012, as the Texas Strikers. Play in the team's inaugural season began in November 2012. In May 2014, the league changed its name to Major Arena Soccer League. The team played at Ford Arena.

Original Texas Strikers Logo

Oxford City Football Club, Inc. purchased the Texas Strikers on July 23, 2014, and the team was renamed after the parent club as "Oxford City FC of Texas".

On December 15, 2014, team owner Oxford City Football Club, Inc. announced that it had "successfully come to terms to sell" Oxford City FC of Texas to an unspecified "Latin American group", pending league approval. CEO Thomas Anthony Guerriero said that their "complete focus as an organization needs to be" on Oxford City F.C. which plays in Conference North, a division of Football Conference at Step 2 of the National League System and the sixth overall tier of the English football league system. The new owners have licensed the rights to use the "Oxford City FC of Texas" name through the end of the current MASL season.

On January 1, 2015, former Hidalgo La Fiera head coach Mariano Bollella replaced Chris "Topper" Cogan as the head coach of the Beaumont franchise. In June 2015, the team ceased business operations.

== Year-by-year ==
| League champions | Runners-up | Division champions | Playoff berth |

| Year | League | Reg. season | GF | GA | Finish | Playoffs | Avg. attendance |
|---|---|---|---|---|---|---|---|
| 2012–13 | PASL | 3–13 | 76 | 192 | 5th, Central | Did not qualify | 422 |
| 2013–14 | PASL | 1–15 | 62 | 195 | 7th, Central | Did not qualify | 321 |
| 2014–15 | MASL | 12–8 | 151 | 134 | 3rd, Southern | Lost division semi-final | 947 |
