= Ford Arena =

Multi-purpose arena in Beaumont, Texas

Coordinates: 30°0′39″N 94°10′48″W

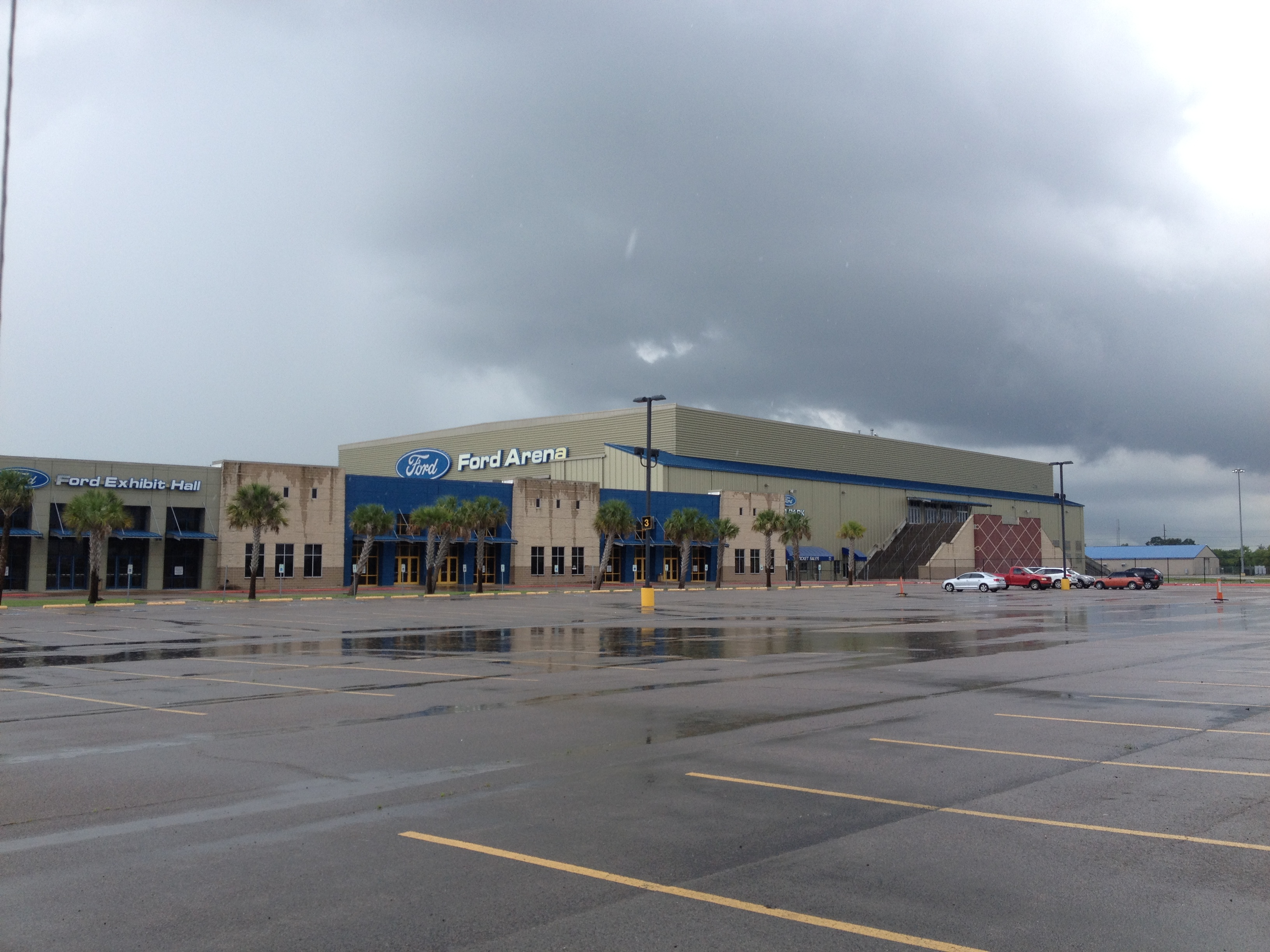
- Interactive map of Ford Arena
- Former names: Southeast Texas Entertainment Center
- Location: 5115 Interstate 10 South; Beaumont, Texas 77705
- Owner: Jefferson County
- Operator: OVG360
- Capacity: 9,737 (Concerts); 9,100 (Basketball); 8,200 (Ice Hockey)
- Surface: Multi-surface

Construction
- Groundbreaking: 2001
- Opened: November 8, 2003
- Cost: $32 million ($56 million in 2025 dollars)
- Architect: Long Architects Inc.
- General contractors: Daniels Building & Construction Co.

Tenants
- Texas Wildcatters (ECHL) (2003–2008); Beaumont Drillers (NIFL/APFL) (2004–2008); Southeast Texas Mavericks (ABA) (2008–2011); Oxford City FC of Texas (MASL) (2014–2015); Beaumont Panthers (TBL) (2022); Beaumont Renegades (NAL/AF1) (2025–present)

Website
- Venue Website

The Ford Arena is a 9,737-seat multi-purpose arena in Beaumont, Texas, USA. The arena has 34,000 sq ft of exhibit space available for conventions and exhibitions. It also includes 7 production offices, 3 dressing rooms, a 2,448 sq ft VIP Club, a 1,107 sq ft party patio, concession stands, and restrooms. It is part of a larger suburban municipal complex called Ford Park. It is currently managed by OVG360, a division of Oak View Group.

== Tenants ==
=== Former ===
Ford Arena was most recently home to Oxford City FC of Texas (formerly the Texas Strikers) of the Major Arena Soccer League. The arena was also home to the ABA Southeast Texas Mavericks basketball team, NIFL Beaumont Drillers indoor football team, ECHL Texas Wildcatters ice hockey team, and the TBL Beaumont Panthers basketball team. It will be home to the Beaumont Renegades in the National Arena League.

== See also ==
- Ford Park
- Montagne Center
- Beaumont Civic Center
- Fair Park Coliseum
