= 2014–15 Ontario Fury season =

Ontario Fury
2014–15 MASL season
- Director of Operations: Cynthia Lilavois
- Head Coach: Bernie Lilavois
- Arena: Citizens Business Bank Arena; 4000 East Ontario Center Parkway; Ontario, California 91764
- Major Arena Soccer League: 2nd, Pacific (regular season)
- Ron Newman Cup: Lost Division Semi-Final
- Top goalscorer: Tiguinho Dias (31 goals, 22 assists)
- Highest home attendance: 4,672 (February 7 vs. Sacramento Surge)
- Lowest home attendance: 1,572 (December 14 vs. Sacramento Surge)
- Average home league attendance: 2,503 (10 games)

The 2014–15 Ontario Fury season was the second season of the Ontario Fury professional indoor soccer club. The Fury, a Pacific Division team in the Major Arena Soccer League, played their home games in the Citizens Business Bank Arena in Ontario, California.

The team was led by general manager and head coach Bernie Lilavois plus assistant coach Joe Pollard. The Ladies of Fury dance team was directed by Lynae de Leon. Ontario finished the 2014–15 season with a 13–7 record, second best in the Pacific Division, but lost their first-round playoff game to the Las Vegas Legends.

== Season summary ==
The Fury struggled early in the season, losing 3 of their first 4 games. A road win over the Rochester Lancers began a 5-game in streak stopped by an overtime loss to the Turlock Express. 2014 ended with a win over the Sacramento Surge and 2015 began with a loss to the Las Vegas Legends. A home win over the Harrisburg Heat was the first of 6 consecutive wins that followed. A pair of losses to the San Diego Sockers at home and on the road left Ontario with a 13–7 record and 2nd place in the Pacific Division. The Fury qualified for the post-season but fell 5–6 to Las Vegas in the Pacific Division Semi-Final.

== History ==
The Fury entered the 2013–14 season as an expansion team in the Professional Arena Soccer League. They got off to a promising start with home wins over the Dallas Sidekicks and Sacramento Surge, but dropped six straight matches then struggled to find their way. With their only road win coming at fellow expansion team Bay Area Rosal, the Fury finished the season with a 5–11 record and missed the playoffs.

== Off-field moves ==
The team established a non-profit organization named the Fury Foundation to promote healthy living to young people. Activities include school assemblies, soccer camps, and an educational program called "Health's A Kick".

In May 2014, the Professional Arena Soccer League added six teams from the failed third incarnation of the Major Indoor Soccer League and reorganized as the Major Arena Soccer League. With the league expansion and reorganization, the other Pacific teams for 2014–15 are California-based Sacramento Surge, San Diego Sockers, and Turlock Express plus the Las Vegas Legends and the expansion Seattle Impact. The Impact's assets were purchased mid-season and the team replaced on the schedule by the Tacoma Stars.

In September 2014, the Fury purchased the Tijuana-based Toros Mexico and designated the franchise as their official developmental team in the Premier Arena Soccer League. Former Toros Mexico owner Joe Pollard will serve as an assistant coach for the Fury as well as running the developmental team.

== Schedule ==
Win Loss

=== Pre-season ===
Game	Day	Date	Kickoff	Opponent	Results		Location	Attendance
Game	Day	Date	Kickoff	Opponent	Score	Record	Location	Attendance
1	Friday	October 12	7:05pm	at Las Vegas Knights	W 8–7	1–0	Orleans Arena	2,275
2	Friday	October 19	7:05pm	Mexican National Indoor Team	L 8–14	1–1	Citizens Business Bank Arena	4,200

=== Regular season ===
Game	Day	Date	Kickoff	Opponent	Results		Location	Attendance
Game	Day	Date	Kickoff	Opponent	Score	Record	Location	Attendance
1	Friday	November 7	7:05pm	Monterrey Flash	L 5–7	0–1	Citizens Business Bank Arena	2,219
2	Sunday	November 9	3:05pm	Sacramento Surge	W 12–7	1–1	Citizens Business Bank Arena	1,738
3	Sunday	November 16	5:05pm	at San Diego Sockers	L 2–7	1–2	Valley View Casino Center	2,913
4	Friday	November 21	7:30pm	at Syracuse Silver Knights♠	L 2–18	1–3	Oncenter War Memorial Arena	3,355
5	Saturday	November 22	7:00pm	at Rochester Lancers♠	W 15–13 (OT)	2–3	Blue Cross Arena	8,214
6	Tuesday	December 2	7:00pm	at Las Vegas Legends	W 8–7	3–3	Orleans Arena	860
7	Sunday	December 7	3:05pm	Turlock Express	W 9–6	4–3	Citizens Business Bank Arena	1,952
8	Sunday	December 14	3:05pm	Seattle Impact	W 13–10	5–3	Citizens Business Bank Arena	1,572
9	Thursday	December 18	7:30pm	at Seattle Impact	W 11–9	6–3	ShoWare Center	365
10	Saturday	December 27	7:05pm	at Turlock Express	L 8–9 (OT)	6–4	Turlock Indoor Soccer	498
11	Sunday	December 28	3:05pm	at Sacramento Surge	W 8–7	7–4	McClellan Park	415
12	Saturday	January 3	7:05pm	Las Vegas Legends	L 8–11	7–5	Citizens Business Bank Arena	2,024
13	Friday	January 9	7:05pm	Harrisburg Heat	W 10–9	8–5	Citizens Business Bank Arena	2,654
14	Saturday	January 17	7:05pm	Turlock Express	W 10–6	9–5	Citizens Business Bank Arena	1,911
15	Sunday	January 18	3:05pm	Las Vegas Legends	W 6–5	10–5	Citizens Business Bank Arena	2,038
16	Friday	January 30	7:35pm	at Turlock Express	W 8–5	11–5	Turlock Indoor Soccer	509
17	Saturday	January 31	7:05pm	at Sacramento Surge	W 11–10	12–5	McClellan Park	395
18	Saturday	February 7	7:05pm	Sacramento Surge	W 26–3	13–5	Citizens Business Bank Arena	4,672
19	Thursday	February 12	7:05pm	San Diego Sockers^{2}	L 5–9	13–6	Citizens Business Bank Arena	4,253
20	Saturday	February 21	7:05pm	at San Diego Sockers	L 1–3	13–7	Valley View Casino Center	4,094

♠ Game played with multi-point scoring (most goals worth 2 points and select goals worth 3 points).
^{2} Originally scheduled for February 15; rescheduled to avoid an arena conflict.

=== Post-season ===
Game	Day	Date	Kickoff	Opponent	Results		Location	Attendance
Game	Day	Date	Kickoff	Opponent	Score	Record	Location	Attendance
Division Semi-Final	Sunday	March 1	3:05pm	Las Vegas Legends	L 5–6	0–1	Citizens Business Bank Arena	4,072

== Awards and honors ==
During the last regular season game, the Fury honored Tiguinho (#10) as the team's Offensive Player of the Year, Jose Rodriguez (#6) as Defensive Player of the Year, and Joey Pacheco (#3) as Iron Man of the Year.

Ontario midfielder Tiguinho Dias was selected for the 2014-15 MASL All-League Second Team. Ontario goalkeeper Alexis Apodaca earned honorable mention for the league's all-rookie team for 2014-15.

On March 13, the MASL announced the finalists for its major year-end awards. These nominees included Ontario general manager/coach Bernie Lilavois for Coach of the Year.
