= 2014–15 Seattle Impact season =

Seattle Impact
2014–15 MASL season
- Owner: Dion Earl
- Head Coach: Dion Earl (games 1–13)
- Arena: ShoWare Center; 625 West James Street; Kent, Washington 98032
- Top goalscorer: Gordy Gurson (36 goals, 12 assists)
- Highest home attendance: 1,348 (November 8 vs. San Diego Sockers)
- Lowest home attendance: 204 (November 28 vs. Turlock Express)
- Average home league attendance: 717 (7 games)

Tacoma Stars
2014–15 MASL season
- Owner: Lane Smith
- Head Coach: Darren Sawatzky (games 14–20)
- Arena: ShoWare Center; 625 West James Street; Kent, Washington 98032
- Major Arena Soccer League: 5th, Pacific (regular season)
- Top goalscorer: Derek Johnson (9 goals, 2 assists)
- Highest home attendance: 1,123 (February 8 vs. Turlock Express)
- Lowest home attendance: 885 (January 16 vs. San Diego Sockers)
- Average home league attendance: 1,038 (3 games)

The 2014–15 Seattle Impact season was the only season of the Seattle Impact professional indoor soccer club. The Impact, a Pacific Division team in the Major Arena Soccer League, played their home games in the ShoWare Center in the Seattle suburb of Kent, Washington. The Impact were led by owner, player, and head coach Dion Earl.

After struggles on and off the field, the team's assets were sold to Lane Smith and his Tacoma Stars completed the Impact's schedule. The Stars were led by general manager John Crouch and head coach Darren Sawatzky. Their season was completed with a combined 4–16 record and 5th place in the MASL's Pacific Division.

== Season summary ==
On the field, the Impact lost their first two games then won their next three in a row. These would prove the last wins for the Seattle franchise as they were followed by 8 consecutive losses amid growing turmoil off the field surrounding the team's owner, Dion Earl, as well as its financial struggles. In mid-January, the Impact folded and their position in the MASL was purchased by Lane Smith who used his own Tacoma Stars to fill out the season. While undefeated in their Western Indoor Soccer League, the Stars lost 4 straight in MASL play before beating the Turlock Express in February. Two more losses on the road gave the team a combined 4–16 record and 5th place in the Pacific Division. They did not qualify for the playoffs.

== Off-field moves ==
In May 2014, the Professional Arena Soccer League added six teams from the failed third incarnation of the Major Indoor Soccer League and reorganized as the Major Arena Soccer League. With the league expansion and reorganization, the other Pacific teams for 2014–15 are California-based Ontario Fury, Sacramento Surge, San Diego Sockers, and Turlock Express plus the Las Vegas Legends.

== Personnel issues ==
The planned "Ladies with Impact" dance team disbanded when several members resigned after alleging that Impact owner Dion Earl made sexual advances on them. The dancers also claimed that the team had not paid them for their work. The dance team's former co-captain obtained a sexual harassment protection order against Earl from King County Superior Court Judge Chad Allred on October 22. Earl denies the claims and says the dance team was going to be disbanded for financial reasons. As of late December 2014, no criminal charges had been filed but the King County Prosecuting Attorney's office was reviewing the case. A civil suit against Earl, the team, and several other parties was filed on November 6, 2014.

Just before the regular season started, head coach Jason Dunn and assistant coach Todd Haley left the team. They asserted that the Impact failed to make contractual payments due on October 25. Impact owner Dion Earl announced that he would serve as head coach as well as continue his role as a player.

On November 21, the Kent Reporter revealed that 22 Seattle Impact players (Ian Weinberg, Taylor Jackson, Brayton Knapp, Steve Mohn, Jeff Bader, Micah Wenzel, Eli Gordley, Mark Lee, Kellan Brown, Kaymran Tairov, Collin Rolfe, Nathan Salveson, Michal Mravec, Marshall Reese, Derek Johnson, Gustovo Bermundez, Francisco Cisnernos, Vince McCluskey, Evan Denmark, Jameal Cox, Tyler Bjork, and Craig Thomlinson) had "left the team in protest of [owner Dion] Earl's conduct". The players wrote a mass resignation letter to the MASL, protesting that "with the daily chaos, firing of our coaches, firing of staff, release of the dance team, poor treatment of players and the polluted media surrounding Dion's sexual assault, bullying, and harassment charges, our reputations are being tarnished and compromised." MASL Commissioner Kevin Milliken declined to comment as the issue was "above my paygrade". Top scorer Gordy Gurson remained with the team, telling the press, "Whatever people want to say, they can say. Right now to me, it's all a bunch of he said-she said."

== Sale to Lane Smith ==
On January 12, 2015, The Seattle Times revealed that Impact owner Dion Earl was negotiating to sell the struggling franchise to Lane Smith, owner of the Tacoma Stars of the semi-pro Western Indoor Soccer League. The sale was completed on January 14 followed by a press conference on January 15 featuring Smith and MASL commissioner Kevin Milliken. The Tacoma Stars purchased the team's assets but did not retain the Impact's staff or players. They completed the Impact's remaining schedule and remained at the ShoWare Center through the end of the season. In May 2015, the team announced it would return to the ShoWare Center for the 2015–16 season.

== Schedule ==
Win Loss

=== Pre-season ===
Game	Day	Date	Kickoff	Opponent	Results		Location	Attendance
Game	Day	Date	Kickoff	Opponent	Score	Record	Location	Attendance
1	Saturday	October 25	7:30pm	at Tacoma Stars (WISL)	L 4–7	0–1	Tacoma Soccer Center	350

=== Regular season ===
==== Seattle Impact ====
Game	Day	Date	Kickoff	Opponent	Results		Location	Attendance
Game	Day	Date	Kickoff	Opponent	Score	Record	Location	Attendance
1	Saturday	November 8	7:30pm	San Diego Sockers	L 4–14	0–1	ShoWare Center	1,348
2	Friday	November 14	7:35pm	at Turlock Express	L 5–11	0–2	Turlock Indoor Soccer	569
3	Saturday	November 15	7:05pm	at Sacramento Surge	W 12–8	1–2	McClellan Park	363
4	Friday	November 28	7:30pm	Turlock Express	W 8–3	2–2	ShoWare Center	204
5	Sunday	December 7	4:00pm	Sacramento Surge	W 6–5	3–2	ShoWare Center	867
6	Saturday	December 13	7:05pm	at San Diego Sockers	L 10–17	3–3	Valley View Casino Center	2,837
7	Sunday	December 14	3:05pm	at Ontario Fury	L 10–13	3–4	Citizens Business Bank Arena	1,572
8	Thursday	December 18	7:30pm	Ontario Fury	L 9–11	3–5	ShoWare Center	365
9	Friday	December 26	7:30pm	Sacramento Surge	L 7–8 (OT)	3–6	ShoWare Center	911
10	Saturday	January 3	7:30pm	Wichita B-52s	L 4–12	3–7	ShoWare Center	723
11	Sunday	January 4	4:00pm	Wichita B-52s	L 5–10	3–8	ShoWare Center	604
12	Friday	January 9	7:35pm	at Turlock Express	L 5–16	3–9	Turlock Indoor Soccer	492
13	Saturday	January 10	7:05pm	at Sacramento Surge	L 7–10	3–10	McClellan Park	435

==== Tacoma Stars ====
Game	Day	Date	Kickoff	Opponent	Results		Location	Attendance
Game	Day	Date	Kickoff	Opponent	Score	Record	Location	Attendance
14	Friday	January 16	7:30pm	San Diego Sockers	L 3–8	3–11	ShoWare Center	885
15	Sunday	January 25	4:00pm	Las Vegas Legends	L 3–13	3–12	ShoWare Center	1,015
16	Friday	January 30	7:35pm	at Las Vegas Legends	L 2–11	3–13	Las Vegas Sports Park^{1}	675
17	Saturday	January 31	7:05pm	at San Diego Sockers	L 4–13	3–14	Valley View Casino Center	7,311
18	Sunday	February 8	4:00pm	Turlock Express	W 12–2	4–14	ShoWare Center	1,123
19	Saturday	February 21	7:35pm	at St. Louis Ambush	L 3–13	4–15	Family Arena	7,056
20	Sunday	February 22	5:05pm	at Missouri Comets	L 1–17	4–16	Independence Events Center	4,843

^{1} Game originally scheduled to be played at Orleans Arena.
