= 2014–15 Sacramento Surge season =

Sacramento Surge
2014–15 MASL season
- General Manager: Ryan Hopping
- Head Coach: Mark Bickham
- Arena: McClellan Park; Sacramento, California
- Major Arena Soccer League: 6th, Pacific (regular season)
- Top goalscorer: Matt Germain (26 goals, 8 assists)
- Highest home attendance: 545 (January 24 vs. San Diego Sockers)
- Lowest home attendance: 358 (January 25 15 vs. San Diego Sockers)
- Average home league attendance: 417 (10 games)

The 2014–15 Sacramento Surge season was the third season of the Sacramento Surge professional indoor soccer club. The Sacramento Surge, a Pacific Division team in the Major Arena Soccer League, played their home games in Jackson Sports Academy at McClellan Park in Sacramento, California.

The team was led by general manager Ryan Hopping and head coach Mark Bickham. The Surge ended the season with a 4–16 record, placing 6th in the MASL's Pacific Division and not eligible for play in the post-season.

== Season summary ==
The Surge struggled at the start of the season, both on the field by losing their first seven games and at the box office with their first four home games averaging just 407 fans, the lowest of the 23 teams in the league. However, late December wins over Turlock Express and the Seattle Impact gave the Surge their first back-to-back wins in franchise history. 2014 ended and 2015 began the same way, with losses, but a struggling Seattle Impact team gave Sacramento its third victory of the season. The Surge suffered 6 consecutive losses before an overtime win over Turlock gave them their fourth win on the year. The season ended with a road loss to Las Vegas. The Surge finished with a 4–16 record, the same as the Seattle/Tacoma combine, but the head-to-head scoring tiebreaker dropped Sacramento to 6th place in the six-team Pacific Division.

== History ==
The Sacramento Surge was a Professional Arena Soccer League expansion team for the 2012–13PASL season. In 1991 and 1992, Sacramento was home to the Sacramento Surge of the World League of American Football. The soccer team is named in their honor.

During the Surge's inaugural season, they struggled to find their footing on the field and placed last in the Pacific Division with a 2–14 record. (One of those two wins was a forfeit, earned when the Tacoma Stars announced they would not travel for the final game of the regular season). The Surge fared only slightly better in the 2013–14 season, earning a 3–13 record with a win over expansion Bay Area Rosal and two over the Turlock Express.

During its 2012–13 inaugural season, the Surge played at Off The Wall Soccer Arena in Sacramento. For 2013–14, they moved to Estadio Azteca Soccer Arena, also in Sacramento. For this season, the team moved to a new purpose-built facility at the Jackson Sports Academy in McClellan Park, on a portion of the former McClellan Air Force Base.

== Off-field moves ==
In May 2014, the Professional Arena Soccer League added six teams from the failed third incarnation of the Major Indoor Soccer League and reorganized as the Major Arena Soccer League. With the league expansion and reorganization, the other Pacific teams for 2014–15 are California-based Ontario Fury, San Diego Sockers, and Turlock Express plus the Las Vegas Legends and expansion Seattle Impact. The Impact's assets were purchased mid-season and the team replaced on the schedule by the Tacoma Stars.

In August 2014, the team replaced original head coach Jorge Fernandez with former Sacramento Knights player and experienced coach Mark Bickham as their head coach for 2014–15. Bickham had most recently served as assistant coach for San Jose Earthquakes U23, the developmental team for the San Jose Earthquakes of Major League Soccer.

== Schedule ==
Win Loss

=== Regular season ===
Game	Day	Date	Kickoff	Opponent	Results		Location	Attendance
Game	Day	Date	Kickoff	Opponent	Score	Record	Location	Attendance
1	Saturday	November 1	7:05pm	at Turlock Express	L 8–11	0–1	Turlock Soccer Complex	460
2	Sunday	November 9	3:05pm	at Ontario Fury	L 7–12	0–2	Citizens Business Bank Arena	1,738
3	Saturday	November 15	7:05pm	Seattle Impact	L 8–12	0–3	McClellan Park	363
4	Saturday	November 22	7:05pm	Turlock Express	L 3–12	0–4	McClellan Park	447
5	Sunday	December 7	4:00pm	at Seattle Impact	L 5–6	0–5	ShoWare Center	867
6	Saturday	December 13	7:05pm	Las Vegas Legends	L 7–13	0–6	McClellan Park	435
7	Friday	December 19	7:35pm	at Turlock Express	L 5–10	0–7	Turlock Soccer Complex	493
8	Saturday	December 20	7:05pm	Turlock Express	W 13–5	1–7	McClellan Park	385
9	Friday	December 26	7:30pm	at Seattle Impact	W 8–7 (OT)	2–7	ShoWare Center	911
10	Sunday	December 28	3:05p	Ontario Fury	L 7–8	2–8	McClellan Park	415
11	Saturday	January 3	7:05pm	at San Diego Sockers	L 5–18	2–9	Valley View Casino Center	3,254
12	Saturday	January 10	7:05pm	Seattle Impact	W 10–7	3–9	McClellan Park	435
13	Friday	January 16	7:00pm	at Las Vegas Legends	L 4–18	3–10	Orleans Arena	1,555
14	Saturday	January 24	7:05pm	San Diego Sockers	L 6–13	3–11	McClellan Park	545
15	Sunday	January 25	3:05pm	San Diego Sockers	L 5–10	3–12	McClellan Park	358
16	Saturday	January 31	7:05pm	Ontario Fury	L 10–11	3–13	McClellan Park	395
17	Saturday	February 7	7:05pm	at Ontario Fury	L 3–26	3–14	Citizens Business Bank Arena	4,672
18	Friday	February 13	7:35pm	at Turlock Express	L 5–9	3–15	Turlock Soccer Complex	385
19	Saturday	February 14	7:05pm	Turlock Express	W 9–8 (OT)	4–15	McClellan Park	413
20	Sunday	February 22	1:05pm	at Las Vegas Legends^{1}	L 3–22	4–16	Las Vegas Sports Park	792

^{1} Game originally scheduled to be played on February 21.
