= 2014–15 Las Vegas Legends season =

Las Vegas Legends
2014–15 MASL season
- Owner: Meir Cohen
- Head Coach: Doug Borgel
- Arena: Orleans Arena; Paradise, Nevada; Las Vegas Sports Park; Las Vegas, Nevada
- Major Arena Soccer League: 3rd, Pacific (regular season)
- Ron Newman Cup: Lost Conference Championship
- Top goalscorer: Ivan Campos (17 goals, 29 assists)
- Highest home attendance: 2,311 (February 13 vs. San Diego Sockers)
- Lowest home attendance: 675 (January 30 vs. Tacoma Stars)
- Average home league attendance: 1,469 (10 games)

The 2014–15 Las Vegas Legends season was the third season of the Las Vegas Legends professional indoor soccer club. The Las Vegas Legends, a Pacific Division team in the Major Arena Soccer League, split their home games between the Orleans Arena in Paradise, Nevada, and the Las Vegas Sports Park in Las Vegas, Nevada.

The team was led by owner Meir Cohen and head coach Doug Borgel with assistant coach Peter Sharkey. The Legends earned a 13–7 record in the regular season, placing them third in the Pacific Division and in the playoffs. They defeated the Ontario Fury and San Diego Sockers to win the Pacific Division Final before losing to the Monterrey Flash in the Western Conference Championship.

== Season summary ==
Las Vegas struggled to start the season, earning a shootout win at home over the Turlock Express then losing twice on the road to the San Diego Sockers (with an at-home loss to the Missouri Comets in between). The Legends beat the Sockers at Orleans Arena then dropped games to the Ontario Fury and Turlock. Finding their footing in mid-December, Las Vegas won 5 consecutive games, including a two-goal win over then-unbeaten Monterrey Flash at Arena Monterrey. A stumble in January saw the Legends lose 2 of 3 games but they finished the season with 5 straight wins (including a win over the then-unbeaten Baltimore Blast) to end the regular season with a 137 record. This was good enough for third place in the Pacific Division and a spot in the post-season. They defeated Ontario then San Diego to claim the Pacific Division crown and moved on to the MASL Western Conference championship against Monterrey but lost both home and road games, ending their playoff run.

== History ==
The Legends, a Professional Arena Soccer League expansion team in 2012–13, were successful in the 2012–13 season, compiling a 13–3 record in the regular season and clinching the Southwestern Division title. The team advanced to the postseason but ultimately fell to the San Diego Sockers 6–5 in overtime in the PASL National Championship Semi-Finals.

They found equal success in the 2013–14 season, earning a 13–3 record and 1st place in the PASL's Pacific Division. In the post-season, they defeated the San Diego Sockers in the Pacific Division Final to advance to the PASL Final Four but fell to Hidalgo La Fiera in the Semi-Final match. They defeated the Cleveland Freeze in the consolation game to take third place overall in the league.

== Off-field moves ==
In May 2014, the Professional Arena Soccer League added six teams from the failed third incarnation of the Major Indoor Soccer League and reorganized as the Major Arena Soccer League. With the league expansion and reorganization, the other Pacific teams for 2014–15 are California-based Ontario Fury, Sacramento Surge, San Diego Sockers, and Turlock Express plus the Washington-based Seattle Impact. The Impact's assets were purchased mid-season and the team replaced on the schedule by the Tacoma Stars.

On March 17, 2015, after Las Vegas was eliminated from the playoffs, owner Meir Cohen told the Las Vegas Review-Journal that he planned for Las Vegas to return next season but with a new head coach and a new playing venue. Cohen wants the Legends to split playing time at the Thomas & Mack Center on the University of Nevada, Las Vegas campus with the new Las Vegas Outlaws of the Arena Football League.

== Roster moves ==
In advance of the February 1 league trade deadline, the Detroit Waza traded team owner and player Dominic Scicluna to the Legends. Scicluna also served as an assistant coach with Las Vegas.

== Schedule ==
Win Loss

=== Pre-season ===
Game	Day	Date	Kickoff	Opponent	Results		Location	Attendance
Game	Day	Date	Kickoff	Opponent	Score	Record	Location	Attendance
1	Sunday	October 12	3:05pm	Mexican National Indoor Team	W 5–3	1–0	Orleans Arena	2,275
2	Sunday	October 19	1:00pm	at US National Indoor Team	L 6–7	1–1	Citizens Business Bank Arena	4,200

=== Regular season ===
Game	Day	Date	Kickoff	Opponent	Results		Location	Attendance
Game	Day	Date	Kickoff	Opponent	Score	Record	Location	Attendance
1	Sunday	October 26	3:00pm	Turlock Express	W 7–6 (SO)	1–0	Orleans Arena	1,125
2	Saturday	November 1	7:05pm	at San Diego Sockers	L 4–5 (OT)	1–1	Valley View Casino Center	3,816
3	Sunday	November 9	3:00pm	Monterrey Flash	L 2–3	1–2	Orleans Arena	1,970
4	Thursday	November 20	7:35pm	at San Diego Sockers	L 2–7	1–3	Valley View Casino Center	1,922
5	Sunday	November 23	3:00pm	San Diego Sockers	W 9–7	2–3	Orleans Arena	1,377
6	Tuesday	December 2	7:00pm	Ontario Fury	L 7–8	2–4	Orleans Arena	860
7	Friday	December 12	7:35pm	at Turlock Express	L 5–6	2–5	Turlock Soccer Complex	532
8	Saturday	December 13	7:05pm	at Sacramento Surge	W 13–7	3–5	McClellan Park	435
9	Friday	December 19	7:35pm	at Saltillo Rancho Seco	W 7–6	4–5	Deportivo Rancho-Seco Saltillo	200
10	Sunday	December 21	5:05pm	at Monterrey Flash	W 8–6	5–5	Arena Monterrey	2,684
11	Tuesday	December 30	7:00pm	Turlock Express	W 7–5	6–5	Orleans Arena	1,997
12	Saturday	January 3	7:05pm	at Ontario Fury	W 11–8	7–5	Citizens Business Bank Arena	2,024
13	Sunday	January 11	5:05pm	at Turlock Express	L 7–8 (OT)	7–6	Turlock Soccer Complex	517
14	Friday	January 16	7:00pm	Sacramento Surge	W 18–4	8–6	Orleans Arena	1,555
15	Sunday	January 18	3:05pm	at Ontario Fury	L 5–6	8–7	Citizens Business Bank Arena	2,038
16	Sunday	January 25	4:00pm	at Tacoma Stars^{1}	W 13–3	9–7	ShoWare Center	1,015
17	Friday	January 30	7:00pm	Tacoma Stars^{1}	W 11–2	10–7	Las Vegas Sports Park^{2}	675
18	Friday	February 6	7:00pm	Baltimore Blast	W 5–4 (OT)	11–7	Orleans Arena	2,028
19	Friday	February 13	7:00pm	San Diego Sockers	W 8–5	12–7	Orleans Arena	2,311
20	Sunday	February 22	1:05pm	Sacramento Surge^{3}	W 22–3	13–7	Las Vegas Sports Park	792

^{1} Seattle Impact shut down mid-season; franchise purchased by Tacoma Stars.
^{2} Game originally scheduled to be played at Orleans Arena.
^{3} Game originally scheduled to be played on February 21.

=== Post-season ===
Game	Day	Date	Kickoff	Opponent	Results		Location	Attendance
Game	Day	Date	Kickoff	Opponent	Score	Record	Location	Attendance
Division Semi-Final	Sunday	March 1	3:05pm	at Ontario Fury	W 6–5	1–0	Citizens Business Bank Arena	4,072
Division Final	Saturday	March 7	7:05pm	at San Diego Sockers	W 7–6	2–0	Valley View Casino Center	4,279
Western Final #1	Friday	March 13	7:05pm	Monterrey Flash	L 6–7	2–1	Las Vegas Sports Park	855
Western Final #2	Sunday	March 15	5:05pm	at Monterrey Flash	L 4–7	2–2	Arena Monterrey	7,028

== Awards and honors ==
Las Vegas defender Enrique Tovar was selected for the 2014-15 MASL All-League Third Team.

Las Vegas' Hiram Ruiz earned honorable mention for the league's all-rookie team for 2014-15.
