= 2014–15 Turlock Express season =

Turlock Express
2014–15 MASL season
- General Manager: Matt Warner
- Head Coach: Art Pulido
- Arena: Turlock Indoor Soccer; 500 S. Center Street; Turlock, California 95380
- Major Arena Soccer League: 4th, Pacific (regular season)
- Top goalscorer: Adrian Gutierrez (11 goals, 17 assists)
- Highest home attendance: 570 (January 23 vs. San Diego Sockers)
- Lowest home attendance: 385 (November 22 vs. Sacramento Surge)
- Average home league attendance: 502 (10 games)

The 2014–15 Turlock Express season was the fourth season of the Turlock Express professional indoor soccer club. The Express, a Pacific Division team in the Major Arena Soccer League, played their home games at Turlock Indoor Soccer in Turlock, California.

The team was led by general manager Matt Warner and head coach Art Pulido. The Surge finished the regular season with a 9–11 record, good enough for 4th place in the MASL's Pacific Division but not enough to qualify for post-season play.

== Season summary ==
The team opened the 2014–15 season with a road loss to the Las Vegas Legends then won their next three games before dropping the three after that. The Sacramento Surge accounted for two of those three wins. The team regained its footing, winning 3 out of the next 4, but 4 consecutive losses in January put the team below .500 on the season and ended their playoff hopes. The team's 9–11 record includes a surprising 9 road losses. Turlock's only road win came early in the season at Sacramento.

== History ==
The Express was founded as an expansion team for the Professional Arena Soccer League's 2011–12 season. Based in the league's smallest market, the team went 10–9 its first season and 9–7 the second, reaching the playoffs both times. The Express started the 2013–14 season strong with a pair of wins but then lost their next 7 consecutive games. The team improved in the second half of the season, Turlock finishing the season with a 5–11 record and averaging 521 fans per home game, but did not qualify for the playoffs.

== Off-field moves ==
In May 2014, the Professional Arena Soccer League added six teams from the failed third incarnation of the Major Indoor Soccer League and reorganized as the Major Arena Soccer League. With the league expansion and reorganization, the other Pacific teams for 2014–15 are California-based Ontario Fury, Sacramento Surge, and San Diego Sockers plus the Las Vegas Legends and the expansion Seattle Impact. The Impact's assets were purchased mid-season and the team replaced on the schedule by the Tacoma Stars.

== Roster moves ==
Defender and assistant coach Enrique "Queeks" Tovar was released by the team on January 29.

== Schedule ==
Win Loss

=== Regular season ===
Game	Day	Date	Kickoff	Opponent	Results		Location	Attendance
Game	Day	Date	Kickoff	Opponent	Score	Record	Location	Attendance
1	Sunday	October 26	3:00pm	at Las Vegas Legends	L 6–7 (SO)	0–1	Orleans Arena	1,125
2	Saturday	November 1	7:05pm	Sacramento Surge	W 11–8	1–1	Turlock Indoor Soccer	460
3	Friday	November 14	7:35pm	Seattle Impact	W 11–5	2–1	Turlock Indoor Soccer	569
4	Saturday	November 22	7:05pm	at Sacramento Surge	W 12–3	3–1	McClellan Park	447
5	Friday	November 28	7:30pm	at Seattle Impact	L 3–8	3–2	ShoWare Center	204
6	Saturday	December 6	7:05pm	at San Diego Sockers	L 4–5	3–3	Valley View Casino Center	2,570
7	Sunday	December 7	3:05pm	at Ontario Fury	L 6–9	3–4	Citizens Business Bank Arena	1,952
8	Friday	December 12	7:35pm	Las Vegas Legends	W 6–5	4–4	Turlock Indoor Soccer	532
9	Friday	December 19	7:35pm	Sacramento Surge	W 10–5	5–4	Turlock Indoor Soccer	493
10	Saturday	December 20	7:05pm	at Sacramento Surge	L 5–13	5–5	McClellan Park	375
11	Saturday	December 27	7:05pm	Ontario Fury	W 9–8 (OT)	6–5	Turlock Indoor Soccer	498
12	Tuesday	December 30	7:00pm	at Las Vegas Legends	L 5–7	6–6	Orleans Arena	1,997
13	Friday	January 9	7:35pm	Seattle Impact	W 16–5	7–6	Turlock Indoor Soccer	492
14	Sunday	January 11	5:05pm	Las Vegas Legends	W 8–7 (OT)	8–6	Turlock Indoor Soccer	517
15	Saturday	January 17	7:05pm	at Ontario Fury	L 6–10	8–7	Citizens Business Bank Arena	1,911
16	Friday	January 23	7:35pm	San Diego Sockers	L 3–10	8–8	Turlock Indoor Soccer	570
17	Friday	January 30	7:35pm	Ontario Fury	L 5–8	8–9	Turlock Indoor Soccer	509
18	Sunday	February 8	7:05pm	at Tacoma Stars^{1}	L 2–12	8–10	ShoWare Center	1,123
19	Friday	February 13	7:35pm	Sacramento Surge	W 9–5	9–10	Turlock Indoor Soccer	385
20	Saturday	February 14	7:05pm	at Sacramento Surge	L 8–9 (OT)	9–11	McClellan Park	413

^{1} Seattle Impact shut down mid-season; franchise purchased by Tacoma Stars

== Awards and honors ==
Turlock defender Enrique Tovar was selected for the 2014-15 MASL All-League Third Team.
