= 2012–13 Turlock Express season =

Turlock Express
2012–13 PASL season
- Head Coach: Art Pulido
- Arena: Turlock Soccer Complex; Turlock, California
- Professional Arena Soccer League: 2nd, Pacific
- Ron Newman Cup: Lost Division Finals
- US Open Cup: Quarter-finals
- Highest home attendance: 534 (November 9, 2012) vs Las Vegas Legends
- Lowest home attendance: 100 (January 25, 2013) vs Tacoma Stars
- Average home league attendance: 403 (over 8 home games)

The 2012–13 Turlock Express season was the second season of the Turlock Express professional indoor soccer club. The Express, a Pacific Division team in the Professional Arena Soccer League, played their home games in the Turlock Soccer Complex in Turlock, California. The team was led by head coach Art Pulido.

== Season summary ==
The Express were successful in the regular season, compiling a 9–7 record and placing second in the Pacific Division. The team won and lost in streaks, dropping their first two games, winning their next six, losing the following five, and ending the regular season with three straight wins. The Express qualified for the postseason and earned the right to play for the Ron Newman Cup in the PASL National Championship. The team lost two straight games to the San Diego Sockers in the Pacific Divisional Finals, ending their playoff run.

The Express participated in the 2012–13 United States Open Cup for Arena Soccer. They defeated the Sacramento Surge in the Wild Card round and the Las Vegas Knights of the Premier Arena Soccer League in the Round of 16 before losing to the San Diego Sockers in the Quarter-Finals, ending their tournament run.

== Off-field moves ==
Turlock was originally scheduled to host the Tacoma Stars on both January 25 and February 15, 2013. To reduce travel costs, the latter game was moved up to January 25 to form a doubleheader.

== Roster moves ==
On December 4, 2012, the PASL named rookie Ivan Campos as its Player of the Week. The league cited his four goals (including the game-winning goal in overtime) against the Anaheim Bolts as well as his having scored in each of the first five Express games.

One of the team's leading scorers, Bronil Koochoie, is a graduate of Turlock High School but has international professional experience with teams in Sweden, Thailand, and Iran as well as several domestic leagues, both indoor and outdoor.

== Awards and honors ==
In postseason honors, forward Ivan Campos was named to the 2012-13 PASL All-League Second Team.

== Schedule ==
Win Tie Loss

=== Regular season ===
Game	Day	Date	Kickoff	Opponent	Results		Location	Attendance
Game	Day	Date	Kickoff	Opponent	Final score	Record	Location	Attendance
1	Friday	November 9	7:00pm	Las Vegas Legends	L 6–10	0–1	Turlock Soccer Complex	534
2	Saturday	November 17	7:35pm	at Tacoma Stars	L 8–9 (OT)	0–2	Pacific Sports Center	478
3	Sunday	November 18	2:05pm	at Tacoma Stars	W 15–10	1–2	Pacific Sports Center	136
4	Saturday	November 24	7:00pm	Sacramento Surge	W 8–5	2–2	Turlock Soccer Complex	390
5	Friday	November 30	7:00pm	Anaheim Bolts	W 13–12 (OT)	3–2	Turlock Soccer Complex	531
6	Sunday	December 9	4:00pm	at Anaheim Bolts	W 17–12	4–2	Anaheim Convention Center	928
7	Saturday	December 15	7:30pm	at Sacramento Surge	W 7–6 (OT)	5–2	Off the Wall Soccer Arena	175
8	Friday	December 21	7:00pm	Sacramento Surge†	W 9–6	6–2	Turlock Soccer Complex	325
9	Saturday	December 29	7:00pm	at Real Phoenix	L 8–9 (OT)	6–3	Barney Family Sports Complex	49
10	Saturday	January 5	7:05pm	at San Diego Sockers†	L 7–11	6–4	Valley View Casino Center	4,680
11	Sunday	January 6	1:00pm	at Toros Mexico	L 10–13	6–5	UniSantos Park	200
12	Friday	January 18	7:00pm	Toros Mexico	L 9–10 (OT)	6–6	Turlock Soccer Complex	500
13	Friday	January 25	3:30pm	Tacoma Stars	L 4–6	6–7	Turlock Soccer Complex	100
14	Friday	January 25	7:00pm	Tacoma Stars	W 9–5	7–7	Turlock Soccer Complex	350
15	Friday	February 1	7:00pm	Arizona Storm	W 11–2	8–7	Turlock Soccer Complex	494
16	Saturday	February 9	7:30pm	at Sacramento Surge	W 9–1	9–7	Off the Wall Soccer Arena	350

† Game also counts for US Open Cup, as listed in chart below.

=== Postseason ===
Round	Day	Date	Kickoff	Opponent	Results		Location	Attendance
Round	Day	Date	Kickoff	Opponent	Final score	Record	Location	Attendance
Division Finals Game 1	Saturday	February 23	7:00pm	at San Diego Sockers	L 11–12 (OT)	0–1	Valley View Casino Center	3,048
Division Finals Game 2	Sunday	February 24	7:00pm	San Diego Sockers	L 4–13	0–2	Orleans Arena	383

=== 2012–13 US Open Cup for Arena Soccer ===
Game	Date	Kickoff	Opponent	Results		Location	Attendance
Game	Date	Kickoff	Opponent	Final score	Record	Location	Attendance
Wild Card	December 21	7:00pm	Sacramento Surge	W 9–6	1–0	Turlock Soccer Complex	325
Round of 16	December 28	5:30pm	Las Vegas Knights (PASL-Premier)	W 11–10 (OT)	2–0	Las Vegas Sports Park	?
Quarter-Finals	January 5	7:05pm	at San Diego Sockers	L 7–11	2–1	Valley View Casino Center	4,680
