= 2012–13 Tacoma Stars season =

Tacoma Stars
2012–13 PASL season
- Chairman: Marian Bowers
- Head Coach: Joe Waters
- Arena: Pacific Sports Center; Tacoma, Washington
- PASL: 3rd, Pacific
- US Open Cup: Quarter-finals
- Highest home attendance: 600 (February 2, 2013) vs Toros Mexico
- Lowest home attendance: 136 (November 18, 2012) vs Turlock Express
- Average home league attendance: 314 (over 8 home games)

The 2012–13 Tacoma Stars season was the third season of the Tacoma Stars professional indoor soccer club as a franchise in the Professional Arena Soccer League. The Stars, a Pacific Division team, played their home games in the new Pacific Sports Center in Tacoma, Washington. The team was led by head coach Joe Waters.

== Season summary ==
The team had mixed results in the regular season, finishing 8–8, including the forfeit of their final scheduled game against the Sacramento Surge. The team struggled on the road with 6 of their 8 wins coming at home. Still, the Stars placed third in the PASL's five-team Pacific Division and only narrowly failed to qualify for the postseason.

The Stars participated in the 2012–13 United States Open Cup for Arena Soccer. They received a bye in the Wild Card round and defeated the Oregon Blacktails of the Premier Arena Soccer League in the Round of 16 before losing to the Las Vegas Legends in the Quarter-Finals, ending their tournament run.

== Off-field moves ==
Between the 2011–12 and 2012–13 seasons, Tacoma Stars team owner Marian Bowers completed construction on a new 52,000 square feet (4,800 m^{2}) multi-sport facility on Tacoma's south side to replace the team's former home, the Tacoma Soccer Center. The Pacific Sports Center seats up to 1,200 spectators, includes 200 parking spaces, and cost approximately $4.2 million to construct. The April 2012 grand opening included free soccer clinics, appearances by Tacoma Stars players, and an "official first kick" by Joe Lonergan, then Deputy Mayor of Tacoma.

On January 19, 2013, the Stars announced a partnership with the local Special Olympics organization. The team hosted a match between the Sounders Special Olympics Unity team and the Tacoma Stars Special Olympics Unity team during halftime of the January 20, 2013, game as part of the Special Olympics Unified Sports campaign.

The Stars were originally scheduled to visit the Turlock Express on both January 25 and February 15, 2013. To reduce travel costs, the latter game was moved up to January 25 to form a doubleheader.

Before the start of the 2013–14 PASL season, the Tacoma franchise announced that it was putting itself on hiatus for at least one season and would return to the Premier Arena Soccer League as the Tacoma Galaxy.

== Roster moves ==
In early September 2012, the Tacoma Stars signed veteran coach Joe Waters for the 2012–13 season. Waters played 8 seasons for the original Tacoma Stars in the 1980s and early 1990s.

The Stars held open tryouts on September 28 and 29, 2012, at the Pacific Sports Center.

== Schedule ==
Win Tie Loss No Game

=== Regular season ===
Game	Day	Date	Kickoff	Opponent	Results		Location	Attendance
Game	Day	Date	Kickoff	Opponent	Final score	Record	Location	Attendance
1	Saturday	November 17	7:35pm	Turlock Express	W 9–8 (OT)	1–0	Pacific Sports Center	478
2	Sunday	November 18	2:05pm	Turlock Express	L 10–15	1–1	Pacific Sports Center	136
3	Saturday	December 1	7:35pm	San Diego Sockers	L 5–15	1–2	Pacific Sports Center	200
4	Saturday	December 8	7:35pm	Sacramento Surge	W 13–2	2–2	Pacific Sports Center	313
5	Sunday	December 9	11:00am	Sacramento Surge	W 12–5	3–2	Pacific Sports Center	287
6	Saturday	December 15	7:05pm	at San Diego Sockers	L 4–14	3–3	Valley View Casino Center	2,586
7	Sunday	December 16	3:00pm	at Toros Mexico	L 3–15	3–4	Unisantos Park	100
8	Friday	January 4	6:00pm	at Las Vegas Legends	L 6–15	3–5	Las Vegas Sports Park	620
9	Saturday	January 5	7:00pm	at Anaheim Bolts	L 7–8	3–6	Anaheim Convention Center	819
10	Saturday	January 19	7:35pm	Anaheim Bolts	W 12–9	4–6	Pacific Sports Center	350
11	Sunday	January 20	2:05pm	Anaheim Bolts	W 9–7	5–6	Pacific Sports Center	150
12	Friday	January 25	3:30pm	at Turlock Express	W 6–4	6–6	Turlock Soccer Complex	100
13	Friday	January 25	7:00pm	at Turlock Express	L 5–9	6–7	Turlock Soccer Complex	350
14	Saturday	January 26	7:30pm	at Sacramento Surge	W 9–5	7–7	Off the Wall Soccer Arena	315
15	Saturday	February 2	7:35pm	Toros Mexico	W 6–5	8–7	Pacific Soccer Center	600
16	Saturday	February 16	7:30pm	at Sacramento Surge	FORFEIT	8–8	Off the Wall Soccer Arena	N/A

=== 2012–13 US Open Cup for Arena Soccer ===
Game	Date	Kickoff	Opponent	Results		Location	Attendance
Game	Date	Kickoff	Opponent	Final score	Record	Location	Attendance
Wild Card			BYE				
Round of 16	December 2	7:00pm	Oregon Blacktails (PASL-Premier)	W 12–2	1–0	Pacific Sports Center	?
Quarter-Finals	January 4	7:00pm	at Las Vegas Legends	L 6–15	1–1	Las Vegas Sports Park	620
