= Gordy Gurson =

American professional soccer player (born 1992)

Personal information
- Full name: Gordon Jay Gurson
- Date of birth: May 2, 1992 (age 34)
- Place of birth: Park Ridge, Illinois, United States
- Height: 5 ft 6 in (1.68 m)
- Position: Forward

Team information
- Current team: Utica City
- Number: 3

Youth career
- 2006–2009: Stevenson High School

College career
Years	Team	Apps	(Gls)
2010	Memphis Tigers	7	(3)
2011–2013	Robert Morris Eagles		(44)

Senior career*
Years	Team	Apps	(Gls)
2013–2014	Chicago (NSL)	7	(22)
2014–2015	Seattle Impact (MASL)	13	(36)
2015–2016	St. Louis Ambush (MASL)	11	(14)
2016–2018	Cedar Rapids Rampage (MASL)	46	(58)
2018	Olympia FC Warriors	8	(13)
2018–2019	Orlando SeaWolves (MASL)	24	(34)
2019	RWB Adria	12	(17)
2019	CD Don Roge (LMFR)	4	(6)
2019–2020	Florida Tropics (MASL)	11	(8)
2020	Iowa Raptors	7	(15)
2020–2021	San Diego Sockers (MASL)	9	(0)
2021–2022	Milwaukee Wave (MASL)	22	(14)
2022–	Utica City (MASL)	33	(32)

International career
- United States futsal
	United States arena soccer	28	(69)
- * Club domestic league appearances and goals as of November 27, 2024

Gordy Gurson (born May 2, 1992, in Park Ridge, Illinois) is an American professional soccer player who currently plays for Utica City FC in the Major Arena Soccer League.

== Early life and education ==
Gurson was raised in the Chicago suburb of Buffalo Grove, Illinois. He attended Stevenson High School where he was named to the All-State team in 2009. He spent his freshman year of college at the University of Memphis then the next three years at Robert Morris University Illinois where he was a three-time All-American.

== Pro career ==
Gurson began his professional career playing for Chicago in the National Soccer League, where he received the Golden Boot Award with 40 scored goals in 17 played games. After playing for one season for Chicago, Gurson signed with the Seattle Impact of the Major Arena Soccer League prior to the team's inaugural season. Mid-season, he was traded to the St. Louis Ambush. Gurson was selected for the 2014-15 MASL All-League Second Team and named to the league's 2014–15 all-rookie team. On March 13, 2015, the MASL announced the finalists for its major year-end awards, including Gurson as a nominee for Rookie of the Year. Gurson received the rookie of the year award honor as well as a call up to the USA national indoor soccer team that won the World Cup in March 2015. Gurson had 1 goal and 1 assist in 6 appearances for Team USA. In 2017/2018 MASL season Gurson broke the single season point record for Cedar Rapids with 49 points. Also was named to All MASL 3rd team. When the Cedar Rapids team moved to Orlando, Florida in 2018 to become the Orlando SeaWolves, Gurson moved with them.

After leading Orlando in points with 17 goals and 8 assists, Gurson joined the SeaWolves' in-state MASL rivals Florida Tropics SC. Though he would injure himself and later be released, Gurson would register 12 points in eleven games, helping the Tropics win the MASL Eastern Conference Regular Season Championship during the COVID-19 shortened season.

Gurson returned to Cedar Rapids in 2020, signing to play outdoors with a newly-formed club, Iowa Raptors FC.

In October 2021, Gurson signed with the Milwaukee Wave.

In May 2022, the Iowa Raptors announced they would be joining Major Arena Soccer League 2 with Gurson as their general manager.
