= 2013–14 Bay Area Rosal season =

Bay Area Rosal
2013–14 PASL season
- Owner: Chris Rockenbaugh
- Head Coach: Mario Astorga (games 1-8); Luis Orellana (games 9-16)
- Arena: Cabernet Indoor Sports; 6474 Patterson Pass Rd. Livermore, California 94550
- Highest home attendance: 652 (November 23 vs. Toros Mexico)
- Lowest home attendance: 143 (February 1 vs. Sacramento Surge)
- Average home league attendance: 350 (8 games)

The 2013–14 Bay Area Rosal season was the first season in the Professional Arena Soccer League for the Bay Area Rosal professional indoor soccer club. The Rosal, a Pacific Division team, played their home games at Cabernet Indoor Sports in Livermore, California.

Bay Area Rosal was led by owner Chris Rockenbaugh and head coach Luis Orellana. Mario Astorga was the team's head coach for its first 8 games of the season before leaving the team in late December.

== Season summary ==
Bay Area Rosal began its inaugural campaign with a pre-season match against the Turlock Express on October 26. The Rosal lost 6–7. They lost their first PASL regular season match 7–12 to the Las Vegas Legends and lost again to Turlock before winning 5 of their next 7 matches to close out 2013. 2014, however, started with 4 consecutive losses and the team ultimately finished the season with a 5–11 record.

The Bay Area Rosal are participating in the 2013–14 United States Open Cup for Arena Soccer starting with a Round of 32 victory over Turlock Express and a Round of 16 win over Sacramento Surge to advance to the Quarter-finals against the Las Vegas Legends. They lost 21–0, ending their tournament run.

== History ==
Founded in 1998 as an amateur club, the team (then known as Bladium Rosal) won the 2012–13 Premier Arena Soccer League championship before moving up to the professional league in 2013. The team shares its "Rosal" name with team owner Chris Rockenbaugh's auto recycling business.

== Schedule ==
Win Loss

=== Pre-season ===
Game	Day	Date	Kickoff	Opponent	Results		Location	Attendance
Game	Day	Date	Kickoff	Opponent	Score	Record	Location	Attendance
1	Saturday	October 26	7:05pm	at Turlock Express	L 6–7	0–1	Turlock Indoor Soccer	300

=== Regular season ===
Game	Day	Date	Kickoff	Opponent	Results		Location	Attendance
Game	Day	Date	Kickoff	Opponent	Score	Record	Location	Attendance
1	Saturday	November 2	7:05pm	Las Vegas Legends	L 7–12	0–1	Cabernet Indoor Sports	543
2	Friday	November 8	7:05pm	at Turlock Express	L 4–6	0–2	Turlock Soccer Complex	629
3	Saturday	November 9	7:05pm	at Sacramento Surge	W 12–5	1–2	Estadio Azteca Soccer Arena	274
4	Saturday	November 23	7:05pm	Toros Mexico	L 7–10	1–3	Cabernet Indoor Sports	652
5	Saturday	November 30	8:00pm	Turlock Express	W 5–2	2–3	Cabernet Indoor Sports	209
6	Friday	December 13	7:05pm	at Turlock Express	W 5–4	3–3	Turlock Soccer Complex	350
7	Sunday	December 15	6:00pm	Toros Mexico	W 9–8 (OT)	4–3	Cabernet Indoor Sports	480
8	Saturday	December 21	7:05pm	at Las Vegas Legends	L 3–13	4–4	Las Vegas Sports Park	324
9	Saturday	December 28	8:00pm	Sacramento Surge†	W 9–5	5–4	Cabernet Indoor Sports	272
10	Saturday	January 4	7:05pm	at Sacramento Surge	L 8–11	5–5	Estadio Azteca Soccer Arena	522
11	Saturday	January 11	8:00pm	Ontario Fury	L 9–10	5–6	Cabernet Indoor Sports	358
12	Saturday	January 18	7:05pm	at San Diego Sockers	L 1–13	5–7	Valley View Casino Center	3,728
13	Sunday	January 19	1:05pm	at Toros Mexico	L 7–17	5–8	UniSantos Park	219
14	Saturday	January 25	8:00pm	Turlock Express	W 8–7	6–8	Cabernet Indoor Sports	144
15	Saturday	February 1	7:05pm	Sacramento Surge	W 16–8	7–8	Cabernet Indoor Sports	143
16	Saturday	February 15♥	5:05pm	at Toros Mexico	L 2–27	7–9	UniSantos Park	118

† Game also counts for US Open Cup, as listed in chart below.
♥ Rescheduled from February 16.

=== U.S. Open Cup for Arena Soccer ===
Game	Day	Date	Kickoff	Opponent	Results		Location	Attendance
Game	Day	Date	Kickoff	Opponent	Score	Record	Location	Attendance
Round of 32	Friday	December 13	7:05pm	at Turlock Express	W 5–4	1–0	Turlock Soccer Complex	350
Round of 16	Saturday	December 28	8:00pm	Sacramento Surge†	W 9–5	2–0	Cabernet Indoor Sports	180
Quarter finals	Sunday	February 16	4:35pm	at Las Vegas Legends	L 0–21	2–1	Las Vegas Sports Park	155
