= 2013–14 Sacramento Surge season =

Sacramento Surge
2013–14 PASL season
- General Manager: Ryan Hopping
- Head Coach: Jorge Fernandez
- Arena: Estadio Azteca Soccer Arena; 1960 Railroad Dr. Sacramento, CA 95815
- US Open Cup: Round of 16
- Highest home attendance: 522 (January 4 vs. Bay Ares Rosal)
- Lowest home attendance: 215 (December 14 vs. Toros Mexico)
- Average home league attendance: 314 (7 games)

The 2013–14 Sacramento Surge season was the second season of the Sacramento Surge professional indoor soccer club. The Sacramento Surge, a Pacific Division team in the Professional Arena Soccer League, played their home games in the Estadio Azteca Soccer Arena in the Natomas section of Sacramento, California. The team was led by general manager Ryan Hopping and head coach Jorge Fernandez.

== Season summary ==
The Surge struggled early in the season, dropping their first six games in regulation with five of those losses by 7 or more goals. The team's fortunes improved in mid-December and early January as the team took Toros Mexico to overtime, beat the Turlock Express, and split a series with expansion Bay Area Rosal. Sacramento ended the season with another win over Turlock, earning them a 3–13 record.

The Sacramento Surge participated in the 2013–14 United States Open Cup for Arena Soccer starting with a Round of 32 victory over the Yamhill County Crew of the Premier Arena Soccer League and a Round of 16 loss to the Bay Area Rosal in a match that doubled as a regular PASL season contest.

== History ==
In 1991 and 1992, Sacramento was home to the Sacramento Surge of the World League of American Football. The Surge won the 1992 World Bowl but, shortly afterwards, WLAF operations in the United States were suspended and the team disbanded. The soccer team is named in their honor.

Sacramento was a Professional Arena Soccer League expansion team for the 2012–13 season and they struggled to find their footing on the field. They placed last in the Pacific Division with a 2–14 record (and one of those wins a forfeit when the Tacoma Stars announced they would not travel for the final game of the regular season). The Surge participated in the 2012–13 United States Open Cup for Arena Soccer. They lost to the Turlock Express in the Wild Card round, abruptly ending their run in the tournament.

== Schedule ==
Win Loss

=== Regular season ===
Game	Day	Date	Kickoff	Opponent	Results		Location	Attendance
Game	Day	Date	Kickoff	Opponent	Score	Record	Location	Attendance
1	Saturday	November 2	7:05pm	at Turlock Express	L 7–10	0–1	Turlock Soccer Complex	550
2	Sunday	November 3	3:05pm	Las Vegas Legends	L 6–14	0–2	Estadio Azteca Soccer Arena	311
3	Saturday	November 9	7:05pm	Bay Area Rosal	L 5–12	0–3	Estadio Azteca Soccer Arena	274
4	Sunday	November 17	4:05pm	at Ontario Fury	L 1–9	0–4	Citizens Business Bank Arena	1,963
5	Saturday	November 23	7:05pm	San Diego Sockers	L 4–11	0–5	Estadio Azteca Soccer Arena	246
6	Saturday	December 7	7:05pm	at Las Vegas Legends	L 6–14	0–6	Las Vegas Sports Park	344
7	Saturday	December 14	7:05pm	Toros Mexico	L 6–7 (OT)	0–7	Estadio Azteca Soccer Arena	215
8	Friday	December 27	7:05pm	at Turlock Express	W 5–3	1–7	Turlock Soccer Complex	320
9	Saturday	December 28	8:00pm	at Bay Area Rosal†	L 5–9	1–8	Cabernet Indoor Sports	272
10	Saturday	January 4	7:05pm	Bay Area Rosal	W 11–8	2–8	Estadio Azteca Soccer Arena	522
11	Saturday	January 11	7:05pm	Turlock Express	L 7–11	2–9	Estadio Azteca Soccer Arena	310
12	Saturday	January 25	7:05pm	at Las Vegas Legends	L 20–1	2–10	Las Vegas Sports Park	448
13	Sunday	January 26	1:05pm	at Toros Mexico	L 6–20	2–11	UniSantos Park	224
14	Saturday	February 1	7:05pm	at Bay Area Rosal	L 8–16	2–12	Cabernet Indoor Sports	143
15	Saturday	February 8	7:05pm	Toros Mexico	L 6–10	2–13	Estadio Azteca Soccer Arena	323
16	Saturday	February 15	7:05pm	Turlock Express	W 8–5	3–13	Estadio Azteca Soccer Arena	300

† Game also counts for US Open Cup, as listed in chart below.

=== U.S. Open Cup for Arena Soccer ===
Game	Day	Date	Kickoff	Opponent	Results		Location	Attendance
Game	Day	Date	Kickoff	Opponent	Score	Record	Location	Attendance
Round of 32	Saturday	December 21	7:00pm	Yamhill County Crew	W 9–6	1–0	Estadio Azteca Soccer Arena	100
Round of 16	Saturday	December 28	8:00pm	at Bay Area Rosal	L 5–9	1–1	Cabernet Indoor Sports	180
