= 2013–14 Ontario Fury season =

Ontario Fury
2013–14 PASL season
- Director of Operations: Cynthia Lilavois
- Head Coach: Bernie Lilavois
- Arena: Citizens Business Bank Arena; 4000 East Ontario Center Parkway; Ontario, California 91764
- US Open Cup: Round of 32
- Highest home attendance: 3,346 (February 8 vs. Las Vegas Legends)
- Lowest home attendance: 1,210 (December 12 vs. San Diego Sockers)
- Average home league attendance: 2,147 (8 games)

The 2013–14 Ontario Fury season was the first season of the Ontario Fury professional indoor soccer club. The Fury, a Pacific Division team in the Professional Arena Soccer League, played their home games in the Citizens Business Bank Arena in Ontario, California.

The team was led by general manager and head coach Bernie Lilavois with assistant coach Sam George, goalkeeper coach Jeff Tackett, and strength/conditioning coach Brent Billbe. The Ladies of Fury dance team was directed by Lynae de Leon.

== Season summary ==
After a promising start with home wins over the Dallas Sidekicks and Sacramento Surge, the expansion Fury dropped six straight matches (including four on the road). They snapped the losing streak with a home win over Toros Mexico but lost two of the following three games. The Fury's sole road win came against the expansion Bay Area Rosal on January 11. Facing probable elimination from the post-season, key players were traded to other teams in advance of the PASL's February 1 playoff roster freeze. Ontario lost its final three games and finished the season with a 5–11 record.

The Ontario Fury participated in the 2013–14 United States Open Cup for Arena Soccer with a Wild Card Round victory over the San Diego Sockers Reserves of the Premier Arena Soccer League and ending with a Round of 32 loss to the San Diego Sockers.

== Off-field moves ==
The team promotions included a Faith and Family Night on February 1.

== Schedule ==
Win Loss

=== Pre-season ===
Game	Day	Date	Kickoff	Opponent	Results		Location	Attendance
Game	Day	Date	Kickoff	Opponent	Score	Record	Location	Attendance
1	Saturday	October 26	7:05pm	Toros Mexico	W 16–8	1–0	Citizens Business Bank Arena	5,285

=== Regular season ===
Game	Day	Date	Kickoff	Opponent	Results		Location	Attendance
Game	Day	Date	Kickoff	Opponent	Score	Record	Location	Attendance
1	Sunday	November 10	4:05pm	Dallas Sidekicks	W 6–5	1–0	Citizens Business Bank Arena	1,856
2	Sunday	November 17	4:05pm	Sacramento Surge	W 9–1	2–0	Citizens Business Bank Arena	1,963
3	Sunday	November 24	4:05pm	Las Vegas Legends	L 10–11 (OT)	2–1	Citizens Business Bank Arena	2,026
4	Sunday	December 1	1:05pm	at Toros Mexico	L 4–18	2–2	UniSantos Park	207
5	Thursday	December 12	7:05pm	San Diego Sockers	L 6–8	2–3	Citizens Business Bank Arena	1,210
6	Friday	December 20	8:35pm	at Monterrey Flash	L 6–13	2–4	Monterrey Arena	5,235
7	Saturday	December 21	8:05pm	at Saltillo Rancho Seco	L 8–16	2–5	Deportivo Rancho-Seco Saltillo	537
8	Saturday	December 28	7:05pm	at San Diego Sockers†	L 5–13	2–6	Valley View Casino Center	3,683
9	Saturday	January 4	7:05pm	Toros Mexico	W 12–5	3–6	Citizens Business Bank Arena	2,653
10	Friday	January 10	7:05pm	at Turlock Express	L 5–6 (OT)	3–7	Turlock Soccer Complex	340
11	Saturday	January 11	8:00pm	at Bay Area Rosal	W 10–9	4–7	Cabernet Indoor Sports	358
12	Sunday	January 19	4:05pm	San Diego Sockers	L 5–6	4–8	Citizens Business Bank Arena	1,860
13	Saturday	February 1	7:05pm	Turlock Express	W 11–3	5–8	Citizens Business Bank Arena	2,269
14	Saturday	February 8	7:05pm	Las Vegas Legends	L 8–10	5–9	Citizens Business Bank Arena	3,346
15	Sunday	February 9	3:05pm	at San Diego Sockers	L 3–10	5–10	Valley View Casino Center	4,092
16	Saturday	February 15	7:05pm	at Las Vegas Legends	L 8–17	5–11	Las Vegas Sports Park	512

† Game also counts for US Open Cup, as listed in chart below.

=== U.S. Open Cup for Arena Soccer ===
Game	Day	Date	Kickoff	Opponent	Results		Location	Attendance
Game	Day	Date	Kickoff	Opponent	Score	Record	Location	Attendance
Wild Card	Sunday	December 15	4:00pm	San Diego Sockers Reserves (PASL-Premier)	W 8–5	1–0	Citizens Business Bank Arena	1,321
Round of 32	Saturday	December 28	7:05pm	San Diego Sockers	L 5–13	1–1	Valley View Casino Center	3,683

== Personnel ==
=== Player roster ===
As of November 25, 2013 Note: Flags indicate national team as defined under FIFA eligibility rules; some limited exceptions apply. Players may hold more than one non-FIFA nationality.

No.	Pos.	Nation	Player
1	GK	JPN	Manabu "Manny" Kaji
2	FW	USA	Eli Gordley
4	MF	USA	Zach Bautista
5	FW	USA	Mikel Palmerin
6	DF	USA	Jeffrey Bader
7	MF	BRA	Luis Henrique Pinto
8	MF	USA	Majell Aterado
9	MF	USA	Miguel Sanchez
10	MF	BRA	Luis "Tiguinho" Dias

No.	Pos.	Nation	Player
11	MF	SLE	Israel Sesay
12	MF	PER	Jhonatan Bravo
13	DF	USA	Joey Pacheco
14	MF	MEX	Mario Gutierrez
15	FW	USA	Tino Nuñez
16	MF	MEX	Oscar Mendoza
17	FW	USA	Joey Pulido
18	DF	BRA	Luis Heitor Piffer
25	GK	BRA	Sanaldo Carvalho

Other players that logged time on the field for the Fury this season include Jay Lee Harris (#2), Robert Tornel (#4), Heriberto Negrete (#9), Hugo Seisdedos (#12), Francisco Magana (#15), Bernie Lilavois (#26), Steven Ritchie (#98), Andru Camacho, Brent Gonzales, Jayro Martinez, Arturo Rodriguez, and Christian Vidaurrazaga.

=== Staff ===
The staff during this season includes Bernie Lilavois as team president and head coach, plus Cynthia Lilavois as director of operations. Assistant coach Sam George, goalkeeper coach Jeff Tackett, strength/conditioning coach Brett Billbe, and director of game day operations Katelyn Eaton make up the game day staff. The team's head trainer is Santana Ruiz, equipment intern is Steven Lucero, and Bill Norris handles media relations. Director of soccer operations is Giovanni Gonzalez, community relations director is Lynae de Leon, and the game day host is Cole Volmer. The Ladies of Fury dance team is directed by Lynae de Leon. The team is headquartered at the Upland Sports Arena in Upland, California.
