= 2014–15 St. Louis Ambush season =

St. Louis Ambush
2014–15 MASL season
- CEO: Andrew Haines
- Head Coach: Daryl Doran
- Arena: Family Arena; 2002 Arena Parkway; St. Charles, Missouri 63303
- Major Arena Soccer League: 5th, Central (regular season)
- Top goalscorer: Elvir Kafedžić (17 goals, 15 assists)
- Highest home attendance: 7,360 (January 3 vs. Missouri Comets)
- Lowest home attendance: 4,207 (November 15 vs. Chicago Mustangs)
- Average home league attendance: 6,110 (10 games)

The 2014–15 St. Louis Ambush season was the second season of the St. Louis Ambush professional indoor soccer club. The Ambush, a Central Division team in the Major Arena Soccer League, played their home games at the Family Arena in St. Charles, Missouri.

The team was led by head coach Daryl Doran and assistant coach Joe Smugala. The Ambush finished the regular season with an 8–12 record, placing them 5th in the Central and out of the post-season. The MASL honored forward Gordy Gurson as the league's Rookie of the Year.

== Season summary ==
The Ambush had a difficult welcome to the MASL, starting the season with 5 losses of their 8 games in 2014. This included a 3-game sweep by the Milwaukee Wave and losing 2 of 3 to defending PASL champion Chicago Mustangs while beating the Detroit Waza and the San Diego Sockers. 2015 proved little better as it began with 4 consecutive losses, 2 each to the Missouri Comets and Wichita B-52s. The streak was snapped by an at-home win over the Tulsa Revolution. The Ambush went on to sweep their 3-game season series against Tulsa but won only 4 of their final 7 games of the 2014–15 season. The team finished with an 8–12 record, fifth place in the Central Division, and did not qualify for the MASL playoffs.

== History ==
Launched as an expansion team in the third Major Indoor Soccer League for the 2013–14 season, the Ambush are named after the original St. Louis Ambush, who played in the second National Professional Soccer League from 1992–2000.

In their only season as members of the MISL, the Ambush earned a 4–16 record (6th in the 7-team league) and failed to qualify for the playoffs. After the 2013-14 season, three other teams left the MISL leading to the league's collapse. Along with five other former MISL teams, the Ambush joined the teams of the Professional Arena Soccer League, which was soon rebranded as the MASL. The other teams in the Central Division are former MISL clubs Milwaukee Wave and Missouri Comets, plus PASL clubs Chicago Mustangs, Tulsa Revolution, and Wichita B-52s.

== Off-field moves ==
On December 13, the team honored the players and coaches of the 1994–95 St. Louis Ambush. That season of the original franchise saw player/coach Daryl Doran lead the team to the National Professional Soccer League championship.

Before the January 3 game against the Missouri Comets, the Ambush and the Unsung Heroes Soccer Organization hosted their second annual Indoor Soccer Classic event. Teams of first responders from the area competed in a friendly soccer match to raise money for the families of "fallen heroes".

On March 23, just after the conclusion of the Ron Newman Cup playoffs, the team announced that head coach Daryl Doran would return for the 2015–16 season. Doran coached the Ambush to a 4–16 record in 2013–14 and 8–12 in 2014–15.

== Schedule ==
Win Loss

=== Regular season ===
Game	Day	Date	Kickoff	Opponent	Results		Location	Attendance
Game	Day	Date	Kickoff	Opponent	Score	Record	Location	Attendance
1	Saturday	November 8	7:35pm	Milwaukee Wave	L 4–8	0–1	Family Arena	6,679
2	Saturday	November 15	7:35pm	Chicago Mustangs	L 3–8	0–2	Family Arena	4,207
3	Saturday	November 22	7:05pm	at Chicago Mustangs	W 8–7	1–2	Sears Centre	1,253
4	Friday	November 28	7:35pm	Milwaukee Wave	L 4–8	1–3	Family Arena	4,719
5	Saturday	December 6	6:05pm	at Milwaukee Wave	L 3–9	1–4	UW–Milwaukee Panther Arena	3,209
6	Saturday	December 13	7:35pm	Detroit Waza	W 7–6	2–4	Family Arena	6,486
7	Saturday	December 27	7:05pm	at Chicago Mustangs	L 4–5	2–5	Sears Centre	2,006
8	Sunday	December 28	6:35pm	San Diego Sockers	W 8–3	3–5	Family Arena	6,574
9	Saturday	January 3	7:35pm	Missouri Comets	L 5–8	3–6	Family Arena	7,360
10	Saturday	January 10	7:05pm	at Wichita B-52s	L 5–7	3–7	Hartman Arena	2,116
11	Friday	January 16	7:35pm	at Missouri Comets	L 5–7	3–8	Independence Events Center	4,587
12	Saturday	January 17	7:05pm	at Wichita B-52s	L 9–14	3–9	Hartman Arena	1,864
13	Friday	January 23	7:35pm	Tulsa Revolution	W 11–5	4–9	Family Arena	5,009
14	Saturday	January 24	7:35pm	Wichita B-52s	L 8–9 (OT)	4–10	Family Arena	6,027
15	Friday	January 30	7:35pm	at Harrisburg Heat♠	L 16–25	4–11	Farm Show Large Arena	2,316
16	Saturday	January 31	7:05pm	at Detroit Waza	W 6–5	5–11	Melvindale Civic Center	674
17	Friday	February 6	7:35pm	Missouri Comets	L 5–10	5–12	Family Arena	6,989
18	Saturday	February 7	7:05pm	at Tulsa Revolution	W 7–3	6–12	Expo Square Pavilion	372
19	Friday	February 20	7:05pm	at Tulsa Revolution	W 14–9	7–12	Expo Square Pavilion	197
20	Saturday	February 21	7:35pm	Tacoma Stars^{1}	W 13–3	8–12	Family Arena	7,056

♠ Game played with multi-point scoring (most goals worth 2 points and select goals worth 3 points).
^{1} Seattle Impact shut down mid-season; franchise purchased by Tacoma Stars

== Awards and honors ==
St. Louis forward Gordy Gurson was selected for the 2014-15 MASL All-League Second Team. Gurson was also named to the league's all-rookie team for 2014–15.

On March 13, the MASL announced the finalists for its major year-end awards. These nominees included St. Louis forward Gordy Gurson for Rookie of the Year. On March 19, the league announced that voters selected Gurson as the MASL's Rookie of the Year.
