= Pacific Sports Center =

Arena in Tacoma, Washington

- Interactive map of Pacific Sports Center
- Location: 2645 So. 80th St; Tacoma, WA 98409
- Coordinates: 47.184842°N 122.471509°W
- Owner: Marian Bowers
- Operator: South Sound Sports Ventures, Inc.
- Surface: Sportturf True Grass

Construction
- Built: 2011
- Opened: 2012
- Cost: $4.2 million

Tenant
- Tacoma Stars (PASL) (2012-2013)

Pacific Sports Center is a 52,000-square-foot (4,800 m^{2}) multi-purpose arena, in Tacoma, Washington. It served as the home turf for the Tacoma Stars of the Professional Arena Soccer League prior to 2014.

== History ==
Between the 2011–12 and 2012–13 seasons, former Tacoma Stars team owner Marian Bowers completed construction on a new multi-sport facility to replace the team's former home, the Tacoma Soccer Center. Limited space for parking and the need for costly repairs led Bowers to build the new 52,000 square feet (4,800 m^{2}) Pacific Sports Center on Tacoma's south side. The privately funded complex seats up to 1,200 spectators, includes 200 parking spaces, and cost approximately $4.2 million to construct.

The center opened to the public in April 2012 with an event featuring free soccer and lacrosse clinics, facility tours, refreshments, appearances by past Tacoma Stars players, and an "official first kick" by Joe Lonergan, then Deputy Mayor of Tacoma.
