= J. T. Thomas (soccer) =

JT Thomas
Personal information
- Full name: James Thomas
- Place of birth: Doncaster, England
- Position: Second striker

Team information
- Current team: St. Louis Ambush

Youth career
- 2016–2017: St. Louis Ambush (reserve)

Senior career*
Years	Team	Apps	(Gls)
2017–	St. Louis Ambush		
- * Club domestic league appearances and goals

James Thomas is an English professional indoor soccer player who plays as a second forward for the St. Louis Ambush in the Major Arena Soccer League (MASL).

== Career ==
Thomas began his Ambush career as a member of their reserve squad for the 2016–17 season before joining the active roster in 2017–18. In April 2020, he signed a three-year contract extension with the team, keeping him with the Ambush through the 2022–23 season.

=== Breakout season ===
The 2019–20 season marked Thomas' breakout year. He appeared in all 21 Ambush games, leading the team in:

- Points (34)
- Goals (25)
- Game-winning goals (2)

== Playing style ==
Thomas plays as a second forward, a position change that contributed to his best season performance. He is known for his dedication and work ethic, often arriving at practice before most of his teammates to put in extra work.

== Personal life ==
Thomas is originally from Doncaster, England. He views Ambush Head Coach Hewerton as his mentor and values the opportunity to develop under his guidance.
