= Ian Weinberg =

American soccer player

Personal information
- Place of birth: United States
- Position: Midfielder

Team information
- Current team: Tacoma Stars
- Number: 16

Youth career
- 1999–2002: Western Washington University

Senior career*
Years	Team	Apps	(Gls)
2002	Eintracht Trier		
2002	Seattle Sounders		
2003	FC Bitburg		
2003	Eintracht Trier		
2004–2005	Cleveland Force (indoor)		
2005	Harrisburg City Islanders (indoor)		
2005	California Cougars (indoor)		
2006–2008	San Diego Fusion		
2010–	Tacoma Stars		
- * Club domestic league appearances and goals

Ian Weinberg is a professional soccer player, owner and operator of IanFitness, coach, and the founder of Soccer Sauce.

== Youth ==
Weinberg grew up in Seattle, Washington, where he attended Garfield High School. He was a four-year starter at Western Washington University, serving as captain his senior season. He led the Vikings to the school's best record, and its first conference championship, finishing his career ranked in the Universities top 10 in goals, assists, points, and games played. He graduated with a bachelor's degree in political science.

== Professional ==
In 2002, Weinberg attended the Pro Select Invitational Soccer Combine where he was named to the all star team. He then joined the Seattle Sounders, playing in four games, before moving abroad to play for FC Bitburg and Eintracht Trier 05 in Germany. He returned to the U.S. where he founded the Soccer Sauce Academy before returning to playing, this time with the Cleveland Force of the Major Indoor Soccer League (MISL). While he scored in a preseason game with the Chicago Storm, he never entered a regular season game. Brief stints with the Harrisburg City Islanders and the California Cougars followed, before settling in San Diego. Weinberg has also played semi-professionally with the likes of the Seattle Hibernian Saints, and the Skagit Rapids. In 2006, he played with the Beck's NSL All Stars in the National Soccer League Indoor Soccer Challenge. That year, he also joined the Southern California Fusion of the amateur National Premier Soccer League. The Fusion won the 2007 NPSL championship, but will not be in the league in 2008., they are the current reigning NPSL champions. In 2010 Weinberg returned to playing professional soccer for the Tacoma Stars. Weinberg started and currently runs IanFitness, a personal training business complete with personal training as well as group training bootcamp. He also operates Soccer Sauce, Development and Placement.

== Coach ==
After returning from Germany, Weinberg created Soccer Sauce Academy, where a backbone of technical and tactical development furthered the growth of many youth players.
