= 2013–14 Turlock Express season =

Turlock Express
2013–14 PASL season
- General Manager: Angelica Perez
- Head Coach: Art Pulido
- Arena: Turlock Indoor Soccer; 500 S. Center Street; Turlock, California 95380
- Professional Arena Soccer League: Pacific
- US Open Cup: Round of 32
- Highest home attendance: 730 (November 22 vs. San Diego Sockers)
- Lowest home attendance: 310 (January 11 vs. Sacramento Surge)
- Average home league attendance: 521 (8 games)

The 2013–14 Turlock Express season was the third season of the Turlock Express professional indoor soccer club. The Express, a Pacific Division team in the Professional Arena Soccer League, played their home games at Turlock Indoor Soccer in Turlock, California. The team was led by general manager Angelica Perez and head coach Art Pulido.

== Season summary ==
The Express started the season strong with wins over Sacramento Surge and expansion Bay Area Rosal but then lost their next 7 consecutive games. A January 10 overtime victory over the Ontario Fury snapped the losing streak but with only the top three teams in each division qualifying for the playoffs, Turlock's chance of reaching the post-season were dashed. Turlock finished the season with a 5–11 record, averaging 521 fans per home game.

The Turlock Express participated in the 2013–14 United States Open Cup for Arena Soccer, losing 5–4 in their Round of 32 game against Bay Area Rosal on Friday, December 13.

== Roster moves ==
In mid-October 2013, the Express announced that several players from last season's roster would be returning for the 2013–14 season. Forward Adrian Gutierrez, midfielders Arturo Pulido and Samuel Saldate, and defenders Martyn Arista and Jesse Horta rejoined the team. The team also announced that new goalkeepers Mitchell Watson and Javier Rosales were signed as free agents.

== Schedule ==
Win Loss

=== Pre-season ===
Game	Day	Date	Kickoff	Opponent	Results		Location	Attendance
Game	Day	Date	Kickoff	Opponent	Final Score	Record	Location	Attendance
1	Saturday	October 26	7:05pm	Bay Area Rosal	W 7–6	1–0	Turlock Indoor Soccer	300

=== Regular season ===
Game	Day	Date	Kickoff	Opponent	Results		Location	Attendance
Game	Day	Date	Kickoff	Opponent	Score	Record	Location	Attendance
1	Saturday	November 2	7:05pm	Sacramento Surge	W 10–7	1–0	Turlock Indoor Soccer	550
2	Friday	November 8	7:05pm	Bay Area Rosal	W 6–4	2–0	Turlock Indoor Soccer	629
3	Friday	November 22	7:05pm	San Diego Sockers	L 3–6	2–1	Turlock Indoor Soccer	730
4	Saturday	November 30	8:00pm	at Bay Area Rosal	L 2–5	2–2	Cabernet Indoor Sports	209
5	Friday	December 13	7:05pm	Bay Area Rosal†	L 4–5	2–3	Turlock Indoor Soccer	350
6	Saturday	December 21	7:05pm	at San Diego Sockers	L 6–9	2–4	Valley View Casino Center	3,416
7	Sunday	December 22	1:05pm	at Toros Mexico	L 8–16	2–5	UniSantos Park	218
8	Friday	December 27	7:05pm	Sacramento Surge	L 3–5	2–6	Turlock Indoor Soccer	320
9	Saturday	January 4	7:05pm	at Las Vegas Legends	L 5–8	2–7	Las Vegas Sports Park	408
10	Friday	January 10	7:05pm	Ontario Fury	W 6–5 (OT)	3–7	Turlock Indoor Soccer	340
11	Saturday	January 11	7:05pm	at Sacramento Surge	W 11–7	4–7	Estadio Azteca Soccer Arena	310
12	Friday	January 17	7:05pm	Las Vegas Legends	L 5–10	4–8	Turlock Indoor Soccer	580
13	Saturday	January 25	8:00pm	at Bay Area Rosal	L 7–8	4–9	Cabernet Indoor Sports	144
14	Saturday	February 1	7:05pm	at Ontario Fury	L 3–11	4–10	Citizens Business Bank Arena	2,269
15	Friday	February 7	7:05pm	Toros Mexico	W 9–6	5–10	Turlock Indoor Soccer	673
16	Saturday	February 15	7:05pm	at Sacramento Surge	L 5–8	5–11	Estadio Azteca Soccer Arena	300

† Game also counts for US Open Cup, as listed in chart below.

=== U.S. Open Cup for Arena Soccer ===
Game	Day	Date	Kickoff	Opponent	Results		Location	Attendance
Game	Day	Date	Kickoff	Opponent	Score	Record	Location	Attendance
Round of 32	Friday	December 13	7:05pm	Bay Area Rosal	L 4–5	0–1	Turlock Indoor Soccer	350
