= Eddie Na =

Guamanian footballer

Personal information
- Full name: Edward Kyung-Rim Na
- Date of birth: February 12, 1996 (age 30)
- Place of birth: Guam
- Height: 1.82 m (6 ft 0 in)
- Position: Striker

Team information
- Current team: Tacoma Stars
- Number: 9

Youth career
- –2013: Curtis Vikings

College career
Years	Team	Apps	(Gls)
2014–2017	Pacific Lutheran Lutes	74	(50)

Senior career*
Years	Team	Apps	(Gls)
2018–2019	Tacoma Stars Reserves (indoor)		
2019–	Tacoma Stars (indoor)	55	(15)

International career^{‡}
2016–	Guam	6	(0)
- * Club domestic league appearances and goals as of 27 November 2024 ‡ National team caps and goals as of 10:41, July 16, 2020 (UTC)

Edward Kyung-Rim Na (born February 12, 1996) is a Guamanian soccer player who plays for the Tacoma Stars in the Major Arena Soccer League, as a striker.

== Early and personal life ==
Na was born on Guam and lived there until the age of 11 before moving to Washington in the United States.

== Club career ==
Na played college soccer for Pacific Lutheran University. He turned professional in December 2017 with Tacoma Stars. He was a member of the roster for the 2019–20 season, scoring 2 goals in 9 games.

== International career ==
Na joined a Guam national team training camp in March 2016. He made his international debut later that year.
