= 2012–13 Sacramento Surge season =

Sacramento Surge
2012–13 PASL season
- Chairman: Airrick Harvey
- Head Coach: Jorge Fernandez
- Arena: Off the Wall Soccer Arena; Sacramento, California
- Professional Arena Soccer League: 5th, Pacific
- US Open Cup: Wild Card
- Highest home attendance: 500 (January 19, 2013) vs Toros Mexico
- Lowest home attendance: 175 (December 15, 2012) vs Turlock Express
- Average home league attendance: 252 (over 7 home games)

The 2012–13 Sacramento Surge season was the first season of the Sacramento Surge professional indoor soccer club. The Surge, a Pacific Division team in the Professional Arena Soccer League, played their home games in the Off the Wall Soccer Arena in Sacramento, California. The team was led by chairman Airrick Harvey and head coach Jorge Fernandez.

== Season summary ==
The team struggled in the regular season, placing fifth in the PASL's five-team Pacific Division, and failed to advance to the postseason. The Surge compiled a 2–14 record with one win coming against Toros Mexico on January 19, 2013, and the other by forfeit when the Tacoma Stars announced they would not make the trip south for the final game of the regular season.

The Surge participated in the 2012–13 United States Open Cup for Arena Soccer. They lost to the Turlock Express in the Wild Card round, abruptly ending their run in the tournament.

== History ==
In 1991 and 1992, Sacramento was home to the Sacramento Surge of the World League of American Football. The team won the 1992 World Bowl, the only North American team to do so. WLAF operations were suspended following the 1992 season and the Sacramento team disbanded. The soccer team is named in their honor.

== Schedule ==
Win Loss No Game

=== Regular season ===
Game	Day	Date	Kickoff	Opponent	Results		Location	Attendance
Game	Day	Date	Kickoff	Opponent	Final score	Record	Location	Attendance
1	Friday	November 2	7:00pm	at Anaheim Bolts	L 5–13	0–1	Anaheim Convention Center	1,394
2	Saturday	November 3	7:05pm	at San Diego Sockers	L 2–15	0–2	Valley View Casino Center	3,545
3	Saturday	November 10	7:30pm	Las Vegas Legends	L 2–8	0–3	Off the Wall Soccer Arena	324
4	Saturday	November 24	7:00pm	at Turlock Express	L 5–8	0–4	Turlock Soccer Complex	390
5	Saturday	December 1	7:30pm	Anaheim Bolts	L 2–10	0–5	Off the Wall Soccer Arena	293
6	Saturday	December 8	7:30pm	at Tacoma Stars	L 2–13	0–6	Pacific Soccer Center	313
7	Sunday	December 9	11:00am	at Tacoma Stars	L 5–12	0–7	Pacific Soccer Center	287
8	Saturday	December 15	7:30pm	Turlock Express	L 6–7 (OT)	0–8	Off the Wall Soccer Arena	175
9	Friday	December 21	7:00pm	at Turlock Express†	L 6–9	0–9	Turlock Soccer Complex	325
10	Saturday	January 12	7:00pm	at Anaheim Bolts	L 5–15	0–10	Anaheim Convention Center	852
11	Sunday	January 13	7:00pm	at Toros Mexico	L 3–12	0–11	UniSantos Park	250
12	Saturday	January 19	8:00pm	Toros Mexico	W 3–2	1–11	Off the Wall Soccer Arena	500
13	Saturday	January 26	8:00pm	Tacoma Stars	L 5–9	1–12	Off the Wall Soccer Arena	315
14	Saturday	February 2	8:00pm	Arizona Storm	L 6–7 (OT)	1–13	Off the Wall Soccer Arena	310
15	Saturday	February 9	8:00pm	Turlock Express	L 1–9	1–14	Off the Wall Soccer Arena	350
16	Saturday	February 16	8:00pm	Tacoma Stars	BY FORFEIT	2–14	Off the Wall Soccer Arena	

† Game also counts for US Open Cup, as listed in chart below.

=== 2012–13 US Open Cup for Arena Soccer ===
Game	Date	Kickoff	Opponent	Results		Location	Attendance
Game	Date	Kickoff	Opponent	Final score	Record	Location	Attendance
Wild Card	December 21	7:00pm	at Turlock Express	L 6–9	0–1	Turlock Soccer Complex	325
