= 2011–12 Tacoma Stars season =

Tacoma Stars
2011–12 PASL season
- Owner: Marian Bowers
- Head Coach: Leighton O'Brien
- Arena: Starfire Sports Complex; Tukwila, Washington
- Professional Arena Soccer League: 5th in Western Division
- Top goalscorer: Ian Weinberg (19 goals, 6 assists)
- Highest home attendance: 147 (December 11, 2011) vs Turlock Express
- Lowest home attendance: 504 (February 11, 2012) vs Anaheim Bolts
- Average home league attendance: 242 (8 regular season home games)

The 2011–12 Tacoma Stars season was the second season of the Tacoma Stars professional indoor soccer club as a franchise in the Professional Arena Soccer League. Head coach Leighton O'Brien led the team to a 3–13 regular season record, leaving them 5th in the Western Division and out of the post-season.

The Stars participated in the 2011–12 U.S. Open Cup for Arena Soccer. They were granted a bye through the Round of 16 then fell to the San Diego Sockers 13–6 in the Quarterfinals.

== History ==
The Stars played this season's home games at Starfire Sports Complex in the Seattle suburb of Tukwila, Washington. General admission tickets were free but seating in this facility was limited. This was the team's only season in Tukwila after leaving their longtime home at the Tacoma Soccer Center and waiting for the purpose-built Pacific Sports Center to be completed.

This team was named after the Tacoma Stars that played in the Tacoma Dome from 1983-1992 as a member of the original Major Indoor Soccer League. An earlier version of this current franchise was incorporated in 2003 as a member of the Premier Arena Soccer League before moving up to the pro league in 2010.

== Off-field moves ==
Early versions of the Stars' schedule for this season showed matches against the California Cougars and the Phoenix Monsoon. The Cougars folded shortly before the season began and were replaced by a new franchise, the Turlock Express. The Monsoon franchise was revoked by the league in late December 2011 and replaced in January 2012 by another new franchise, the Arizona Storm, who inherited their roster and record.

== Roster moves ==
The Stars held open tryouts on September 29, 2011, at the Starfire Sports Complex. A second open tryout was held on October 6, 2011. In early October 2011, the Stars announced a preliminary roster for the season based on these tryouts that included several players from the 2010–11 team as well as veterans of the Kitsap Pumas, Seattle Sounders, and various area Premier Arena Soccer League teams.

Later in October 2011, the team announced the signing of players Leighton O'Brien and Kevin Sakuda, both veterans of the Seattle Sounders and several indoor soccer teams. O'Brien would also serve as the team's head coach this season.

In late October, the team announced the signings of Seattle Sounders veteran Viet Nguyen and English player Adam Nowland. On November 1, 2011, the Stars announced the re-signing of re-signings of defenders Steve Mohn, Vitalie Bulala, and Jeff Bader plus midfielder Mark Lee. On November 3, the team announced the re-signing of re-signings of defender Kris Bowers plus midfielders Ian Weinberg and Micah Wenzel. The same day, the team signed defender Kellen Wantulok, forward Eli Gordley, and midfielder Kyle Johnson, all formerly of the Kitsap Pumas.

== Awards and honors ==
Citing his 5 goals and 4 assists in leading the Stars through back-to-back victories over the team from Arizona the previous weekend, the Professional Arena Soccer League named Adam Nowland as its Player of the Week on December 7, 2011.

== Schedule ==
Win Tie Loss

=== Exhibition ===
Game	Day	Date	Kickoff	Opponent	Results		Location	Attendance
Game	Day	Date	Kickoff	Opponent	Final score	Team record	Location	Attendance
1	Saturday	November 19	7:00pm	at WSA Rapids	W 9–5	1–0	Bellingham Sportsplex	

=== Regular season ===
Game	Day	Date	Kickoff	Opponent	Results		Location	Attendance
Game	Day	Date	Kickoff	Opponent	Final score	Team record	Location	Attendance
1	Friday	November 4	7:35pm	at Turlock Express	L 5–8	0–1	Turlock Soccer Complex	308
2	Saturday	November 5	7:35pm	at Turlock Express	L 3–7	0–2	Turlock Soccer Complex	280
3	Saturday	December 3	7:00pm	Phoenix Monsoon	W 9–5	1–2	Starfire Sports Complex	270
4	Sunday	December 4	3:00pm	Phoenix Monsoon	W 13–5	2–2	Starfire Sports Complex	200
5	Saturday	December 10	8:00pm	Turlock Express	W 10–6	3–2	Starfire Sports Complex	204
6	Sunday	December 11	3:00pm	Turlock Express	L 6–10	3–3	Starfire Sports Complex	147
7	Friday	December 16	7:05pm	at Revolución Tijuana	L 10–13	3–4	Furati Arena	150
8	Saturday	December 17	7:05pm	at San Diego Sockers	L 3–8	3–5	Chevrolet Del Mar Arena	2,470
9	Saturday	January 14	7:00pm	San Diego Sockers†	L 6–13	3–6	Starfire Sports Complex	211
10	Sunday	January 15	3:00pm	San Diego Sockers	L 6–10	3–7	Starfire Sports Complex	159
11	Saturday	February 11	7:00pm	Anaheim Bolts	L 10–12	3–8	Starfire Sports Complex	504
12	Sunday	February 12	3:00pm	Anaheim Bolts	L 11–12	3–9	Starfire Sports Complex	243
13	Friday	February 24	7:05pm	at Revolución Tijuana	L 6–13	3–10	Furati Arena	200
14	Saturday	February 25	7:05pm	at San Diego Sockers	L 4–9	3–11	Chevrolet Del Mar Arena	2,123
15	Sunday	February 26 §	1:00pm	at Anaheim Bolts	L 6–9	3–12	Anaheim Convention Center	249
16	Sunday	February 26	6:00pm	at Anaheim Bolts	L 9–10	3–13	Anaheim Convention Center	367

† Game also counted for US Open Cup, as listed in chart below. § Game rescheduled from Sunday, December 18, 2011, due to "arena equipment issues".

=== 2011–12 US Open Cup for Arena Soccer ===
Game	Date	Kickoff	Opponent	Results		Location	Attendance
Game	Date	Kickoff	Opponent	Final score	Record	Location	Attendance
Round of 16	BYE						
Quarter-final	January 14	7:00pm	San Diego Sockers	L 6–13	0–1	Starfire Sports Complex	211
