= Arlington Aviators =

Arlington Aviators FC
- Full name: Arlington Aviators FC
- Nickname: The Fly Boys
- Founded: 2012
- Ground: Soccer First Indoor Sports
- Capacity: 300
- General Manager: Merrick Parnell
- Head Coach: Dagi Kesim
- League: Western Indoor Soccer League
- 2014-2015: TBD
- Website: http://soccer-first.net
Home colors	Away colors

The Arlington Aviators FC were an American indoor soccer team, founded in 2012. Arlington competed in the Western Indoor Soccer League (WISL) and PASL-Premier. Arlington played their home matches at the Soccer First Indoor Sports in Arlington, Washington.

The team is a former member of the Premier Arena Soccer League (2012–14).

== Year-by-year ==
Year	Win	Loss	Tie	League	Division	Reg. season	Playoffs
2012-2013	4	4	0	PASL-Premier	Northwest	5th, Northwest	DNQ
2013-2014	6	2	2	PASL-Premier	Northwest	2nd, Northwest North	1st Round, Northwest North
2014-2015	0	8	0	WISL	WISL	5th	DNQ
