= Anibal Echeverria =

Salvadoran footballer (born 1987)

Personal information
- Date of birth: September 5, 1987 (age 39)
- Place of birth: Reno, Nevada, United States
- Height: 5 ft 6 in (1.68 m)
- Position: Midfielder

College career
Years	Team	Apps	(Gls)
2008	Feather River Golden Eagles		

Senior career*
Years	Team	Apps	(Gls)
2015–2016	Sacramento Surge (indoor)	17	(28)
2016–2017	Turlock Express (indoor)	12	(16)
2017	Reno 1868	3	(0)
2017–2018	Soles de Sonora (indoor)	21	(24)
2018–	Western Nevada Coyotes		
2018–2019	Ontario Fury (indoor)	10	(8)
2019–2020	Turlock Cal Express (indoor)	12	(10)
- * Club domestic league appearances and goals as of 6 May 2021

Anibal Echeverria (born August 14, 1988) is a Salvadoran footballer who plays for Western Nevada FC Coyotes of the United Premier Soccer League.

== Career ==
Echeverria played one year of college soccer at Feather River College in 2008, where he helped the team advance to the CCCAA North Region playoffs.

Echeverria has played with numerous indoor soccer teams, including Sacramento Surge, San Francisco Stompers, Phenomenos FC, and Turlock Express. He signed with United Soccer League side Reno 1868 FC on February 9, 2017.

=== International ===
Echeverria has represented El Salvador's national indoor soccer team as part of their Indoor World Cup squad in 2015.
