= Jason Dunn (soccer) =

American soccer player

Personal information
- Full name: Jason Edward Dunn
- Date of birth: October 4, 1971 (age 55)
- Place of birth: Olympia, Washington, U.S.
- Height: 6 ft 1 in (1.85 m)
- Position: Forward

Youth career
- –1990: North Thurston Rams

College career
Years	Team	Apps	(Gls)
1990	Washington Huskies		
1991–1993	Seattle Pacific Falcons		

Senior career*
Years	Team	Apps	(Gls)
1994–1996	Seattle Sounders	63	(21)
1996–2001	Wichita Wings (indoor)	178	(265)
1997	Seattle SeaDogs (indoor)		
2002	Harrisburg Heat (indoor)	12	(7)

International career
1994	United States	3	(0)

Managerial career
- 1993: Seattle Pacific Falcons (assistant)
- 2014: Seattle Impact
- 2024–: Oly Town
- * Club domestic league appearances and goals

Jason Dunn (born October 4, 1971) is an American retired soccer forward who is currently the head coach of USL League Two club Oly Town FC. He was the 1994 American Professional Soccer League and the 1996-1997 National Professional Soccer League Rookies of the Year. He also earned three caps with the U.S. national team in 1994.

== High school and college ==
Dunn grew up in Olympia, Washington, where he attended North Thurston High School. During his four seasons at North Thurston, Dunn was a four-time All-state soccer player. As a senior, the team won the Washington State championship. Dunn was selected as an All-American his senior season where he scored 34 goals and added 27 assists. Dunn graduated in 1990.

In 1991, Dunn, and his twin brother, James, entered Seattle Pacific University. Over his three seasons with the NCAA Division II Falcons, Jason became a prolific scorer, earning first team All-American recognition in 1992 and 1993. In 1993, the Falcons won the Division II championship. In his last season, he also served as a co-captain along with his brother James.

== Seattle Sounders ==
On March 30, 1994, Dunn became the first player to sign with the expansion Seattle Sounders of the American Professional Soccer League (APSL). That year, he scored ten goals in twenty-two games, earning APSL Rookie of the Year and second team All Star honors. He repeated as a second team All Star in 1995, as he scored seven goals in twenty-five games.

== Indoor Soccer ==
In 1996, Dunn signed with the Wichita Wings of the indoor National Professional Soccer League (NPSL). He was selected the 1996-1997 NPSL Rookie of the Year. Over five seasons, he scored 265 goals in 178 games, his best season coming in 1999-2000 when he scored ninety-five goals in forty-four games. That season, he was a first team NPSL All Star. Dunn was injured during the 2000–2001 season, limited him to only eighteen games. At the end of the season, Dunn moved to the Harrisburg Heat of Major Indoor Soccer League (MISL), but appeared in only twelve games before retiring from playing professionally.

In 1997, Dunn had also spent a single season with the Seattle SeaDogs of the Continental Indoor Soccer League (CISL), which played during the summer.

== National team ==
After his outstanding rookie season with the Seattle Sounders, Dunn was called up for three national team games that fall. He earned his first cap in a 1–0 loss to Trinidad and Tobago on November 19, 1994, when he came on for Jovan Kirovski at the 61st minute. Three days later, he again came on for Kirovski, this time at halftime, in a 3–0 win over Jamaica. Dunn's last cap came in a 1–1 tie with Honduras on December 11, 1994. While Dunn started, he came off for Nelson Vargas at halftime.

== Coaching career ==
On July 4, 2014, it was announced that Dunn would be the inaugural head coach of the Major Arena Soccer League's Seattle Impact. Dunn left the team just before the start of the regular season after the team failed to make contractual payments to him and his assistant coach, Todd Haley.

Dunn was named head coach of Oly Town FC's USL League Two side in January 2024.
