= Western Indoor Soccer League =

- Founded: June 20, 2014
- Country: United States
- Number of clubs: 9
- Current champions: Tacoma Stars Reserves (2025)
- Most championships: Tacoma Stars Reserves (6 titles)
- Website: http://www.wisl-soccer.com

The Western Indoor Soccer League (WISL) is an American semi-professional indoor soccer league. It was formed on June 20, 2014 by a group of arena operators and team owners in the Pacific Northwest. The WISL began its first season on November 15, 2014 with five teams.

Founding member clubs included Arlington Aviators, Bellingham United FC, OlyTown Artesians, Tacoma Stars and Wenatchee Fire.

Many of the founding clubs previously competed in the Premier Arena Soccer League.

Through ten seasons only two clubs (Tacoma Stars Reserves & Bellingham United FC) have won a men's league championship.

== Teams ==
Map of Western Indoor Soccer League teams
Both Mens & Womens Mens Only
Expansion Teams

Team	City/Area	Arena	Coach
Bellingham United FC	Bellingham, Washington	Bellingham Sports Complex	Richard Henderson
Everett City FC	Everett, Washington	Everett Soccer Arena	Uriel Herrera
Oly-Pen Force	Bremerton, Washington	Bremerton Sports Complex	David Meherg
Snohomish Sky	Snohomish, Washington	Snohomish Soccer Dome	Aaron Burns
South Sound FC	Tacoma, Washington	Tacoma Soccer Center	Derek Johnston
Tacoma Stars Reserves	Tacoma, Washington	Tacoma Soccer Center	Adam Becker
Vancouver Storm	Vancouver, Washington	Clark County Indoor Sports Center	Abraham Selim

=== Women's teams ===
Team	City/Area	Arena	Coach
Bellingham United FC	Bellingham, Washington	Bellingham Sports Complex	Emily Webester
Oly-Pen Force	Bremerton, Washington	Bremerton Sports Complex	T.R. Jewett
Tacoma Galaxy	Tacoma, Washington	Tacoma Soccer Center	Adam Becker
Snohomish Sky	Snohomish, Washington	Snohomish Soccer Dome	Jordin Jones

== Future Teams ==
On April 26th 2026, the WISL & The FC Olympia organization have announced the Oly Town Artesians would join back from a 2-year hiatus for the 2026-27 season.

The league has current discussions with potential clubs from Oregon & additional markets from Washington.

Team	City/Area	Arena	Joining	Coach
Oly Town Artesians	Olympia, Washington	Oly Arena	2014-15/2026-27 (Return from Hiatus)	

== Former member clubs ==
- Arlington Aviators (2014–15)
- Portland Blacktails (2021–23)
- Snohomish Skyhawks (2015–20)
- Sporting Everett FC (2015–17)
- Tacoma Narrows FC (2018–20)
- Vancouver Victory FC (2015–16)
- Wenatchee Fire (2014–15)
- Snohomish County FC (2020-2025)

== Champions ==
=== Mens ===
Season	Champions	Score	Runner-up
2014–15	Tacoma Stars Reserves	6–2	Bellingham United FC
2015–16	Bellingham United FC	8–5	Olympic Force
2016–17	Bellingham United FC	10–4	Olympic Force
2017–18	Bellingham United FC	6–5	Tacoma Stars Reserves
2018–19	Tacoma Stars Reserves	7–5	Bellingham United FC
2019–20	Bellingham United FC	6–4	Tacoma Stars Reserves
2020–21	Tacoma Stars Reserves	8–5	Bellingham United FC
2022–23	Tacoma Stars Reserves	7–5	Everett City FC
2023–24	Tacoma Stars Reserves	7–5	Bellingham United FC
2024–25	Tacoma Stars Reserves	6–3	Bellingham United FC
2025-26	Bellingham United	8-4	Tacoma Stars Reserves

=== Womens ===
Season	Champions	Score	Runner-up
2024-25	Snohomish Sky	7-2	Bellingham United
2025-26	Snohomish Sky	8-5	Tacoma Galaxy
