= St. Louis Ambush (2013) =

Professional indoor soccer team based in St. Charles, Missouri

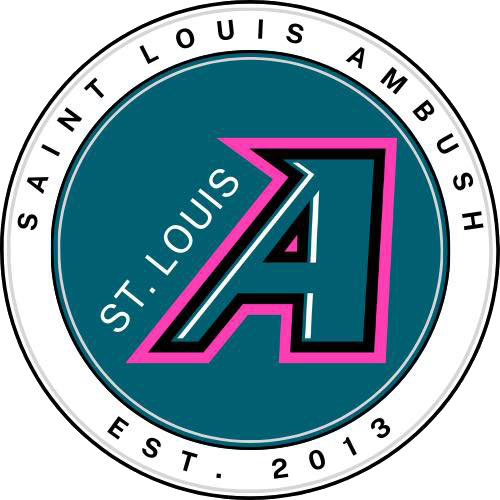
- Founded: 2013; 13 years ago
- Stadium: Family Arena
- Capacity: 9,643
- Coordinates: 38.747768°N 90.509443°W
- Owner(s): Will and Shelly Clark, Jeff and Heather Locker
- Manager: Jeff Locker
- League: Major Arena Soccer League
- 2023–24: 6th, Eastern Division; Playoffs: DNQ
- Website: stlambush.com
Home colors

The St. Louis Ambush are an American professional indoor soccer team based in the Greater St. Louis area that competes in the Major Arena Soccer League (MASL). They are the second team to use this name. This version of the Ambush play in the MASL, while the original St. Louis Ambush played in the National Professional Soccer League.

The current ownership group of the Ambush is Shelly and Will Clark, and Jeff and Heather Locker.

== History ==
The Ambush originally joined the Major Indoor Soccer League in 2013. In their only season as members of the MISL, the Ambush posted only four wins while losing 16 games.

After the 2013–2014 season, the team announced that it was leaving the MISL along with five other teams to join the Major Arena Soccer League.

At a May 3, 2016, press conference in Lakeland, Florida, it was announced the Ambush were moving to the newly established Indoor Professional League (IPL) with the Baltimore Blast and expansion franchise Florida Tropics SC. However, on August 29, 2016, it was announced that all IPL teams would be joining (or re-joining) the MASL.

The MASL had a "free agent" period for the first two weeks of May 2017, where any players who were free agents were free to negotiate with any team in the league. The St. Louis Ambush failed to sign any players during the "free agent" period, though few players changed teams in the league during this period in May.

On December 14, 2015, Tony Glavin took over as the head coach of the St. Louis Ambush and served as the head coach for the remainder of the 2015–2016 season. Glavin continued as head coach in the 2016–2017 season and would finish with a 1–19 record. During the off-season a committee was formed to search for a new coach, with the position expected to be filled by the end of August 2017 prior to team tryouts. On August 28, 2017, the St. Louis Ambush named Hewerton Moreira as their player/head coach.

In the 2017–18 season, the first under Moreira's leadership, the on field woes continued for the Ambush as they finished the season with a record of 3–19. At one point, the team went an entire year without a single win. Nonetheless, Moreira's contract was extended on April 16, 2018, through the 2019–2020 season where the team ended with a 10–14 record. Hewerton officially retired as a player after the season and now serves as the full time head coach for the team.

In December 2019, Tony Glavin and Dr. Elizabeth Perez sold their interest in the Ambush to St Charles natives, Jeff and Heather Locker and they join Shelly and Will Clark in the ownership of the Ambush.

In the first week of the 2018 off-season the franchise announced that it was bringing back the Ambush Brigade dance team as an "effort to improve game-day entertainment". The Brigade has seen a recent name change and are now known as the Bombshells.

The Ambush finished with a record of 8–7 in the abbreviated 2021 season. This was the first winning record for the Ambush since the team started in 2013. The Ambush finished fourth in the standings, of the seven teams which played in the 2021 season. Several of the league teams were unable to play due to COVID-19 restrictions in their home cities. The Ambush also made their first playoff appearance since returning to indoor soccer in 2013. The Ambush lost both games of a two-game series to the Kansas City Comets in March 2021. However, the Ambush have since been below .500 for three consecutive years. In 2024, the Ambush finished 4-14-6.

== Stadium ==
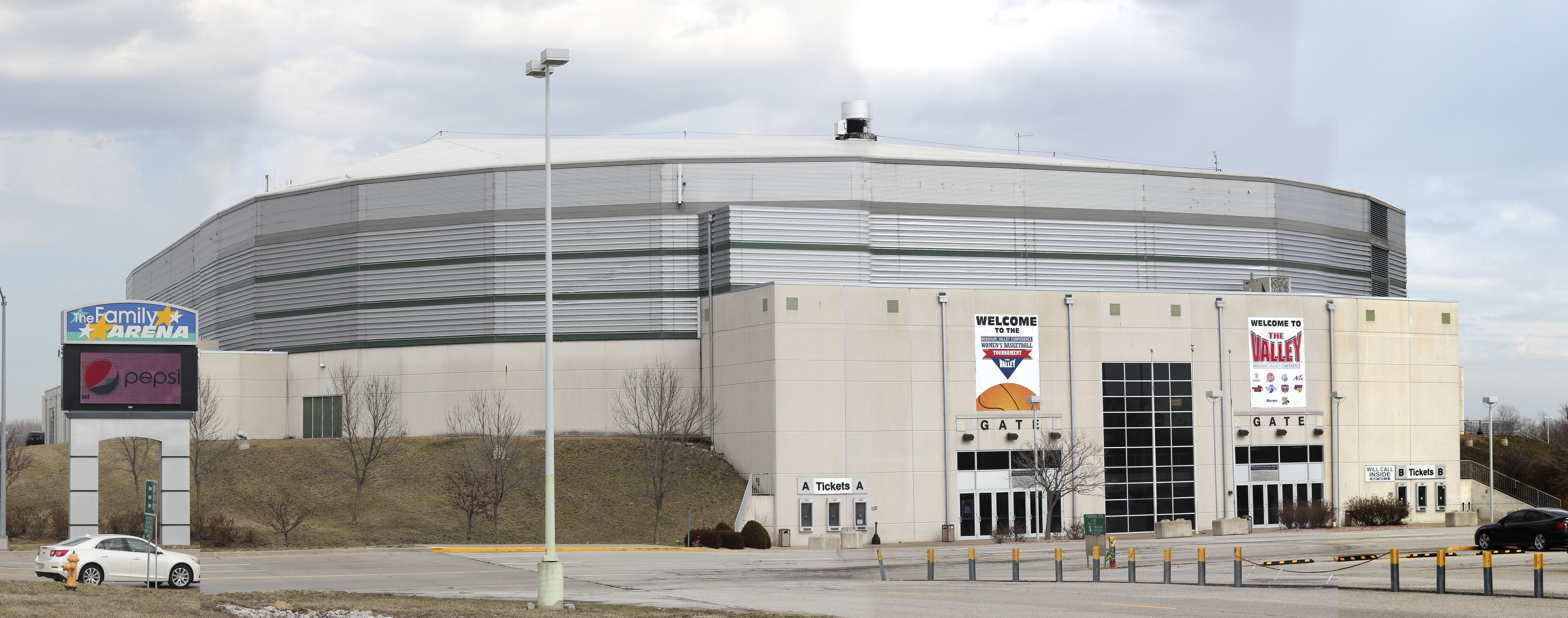
The Family Arena in St. Charles

During the 2013–14 season, the Ambush used both the lower bowl and upper deck of the Family Arena. Since 2014, the Ambush have only used the lower bowl for seating fans. The lower bowl of the Family Arena has a capacity of about 5,000 fans. During the 2021 season, the Family Arena hosted home games for the Ambush and some playoff games, with socially distanced seating. The upper deck of the Arena was also opened up for seating for the first time for indoor soccer games since 2014. Extra precautions were taken, such as having all fans travel in one direction on the concourse, to ensure safe distancing, and air flow in the arena was enhanced.

In 2024, St. Charles County announced it was investing $13 million in upgrades to the facility, including new lower bowl seating, new video and ribbon boards, and interior public Wi-Fi.

== Statistics year-by-year ==
Year	League	Reg. season	Playoffs	Avg. Attendance
2013–14	MISL	6th, 4–16	DNQ	5,636
2014–15	MASL	5th, Central, 8–12	DNQ	6,110
2015–16	MASL	4th, Central, 5–15	DNQ	5,301
2016–17	MASL	5th, Central, 1–19	DNQ	2,574
2017–18	MASL	4th, Central, 3–19	DNQ	2,605
2018–19	MASL	3rd, South Central, 10–14	DNQ	2,553
2019–20	MASL	7th, Eastern, 9–12	DNQ	3,096
2020–21	MASL	4th, MASL, 8-7	Quarterfinals	1,758
2021–22	MASL	3rd, MASL Central, 10-14	Quarterfinals	2,327
2022–23	MASL	6th, MASL Eastern, 9-15	DNQ	2,450
2023-24	MASL	6th, MASL Eastern, 4-20	DNQ	2,510
2024-25	MASL	8th, 11-12-1	Quarterfinals	2,101

== Players ==
=== Active players ===
As of July 15, 2023.

Note: Flags indicate national team as defined under FIFA eligibility rules; some limited exceptions apply. Players may hold more than one non-FIFA nationality.

No.	Pos.	Nation	Player
3	GK	TRI	Christian Briggs
4	FW	USA	Triston Austin
5	FW	USA	Mike Sharf
6	MF	USA	Wyatt Fowler
10	MF	BRA	Lucas Almeida
11	FW	USA	Robert Kristo
12	MF/DF	USA	Kyle Swammer
13	MF/DF	USA	Curtis Kirby
14	DF	USA	William Eskay
15	FW/MF	USA	Billy Stimac
16	DF	USA	Sam Guernsey
17	GK	BRA	Paulo Nascimento
18	DF	FRA	Wil Nyamsi
19	DF	USA	Greg Kranz
20	FW	ENG	JT Thomas
21	FW	USA	Anthony Brown

No.	Pos.	Nation	Player
23	FW	USA	Marcell Berry
25	MF	USA	John Eberle
26	MF	JPN	Naoto Yamaguchi
27	DF	BRA	Erik Pereira
31	GK	USA	Mark Baker
33	DF	BRA	Pepe Junqueira
38	FW	USA	Antonio Manfut
41	FW	USA	Brian Bement
49	DF	USA	Niko Karidis
77	DF	USA	Zachary Druhe
80	DF	USA	Richard Schmermund
83	FW	USA	Dom Alvarado
97	MF	USA	Ado Jahic
99	GK	USA	Jose Ogaz

=== Inactive players ===
Note: Flags indicate national team as defined under FIFA eligibility rules; some limited exceptions apply. Players may hold more than one non-FIFA nationality.

No.	Pos.	Nation	Player
8	DF	IRL	Vadim Cojocov
9	FW	USA	Kevin Ellis
28	DF	USA	Tim Menzel

No.	Pos.	Nation	Player
82	GK	BRA	Rafael Dias
88	FW	BRA	Duduca Carvalho

== Head coaches ==
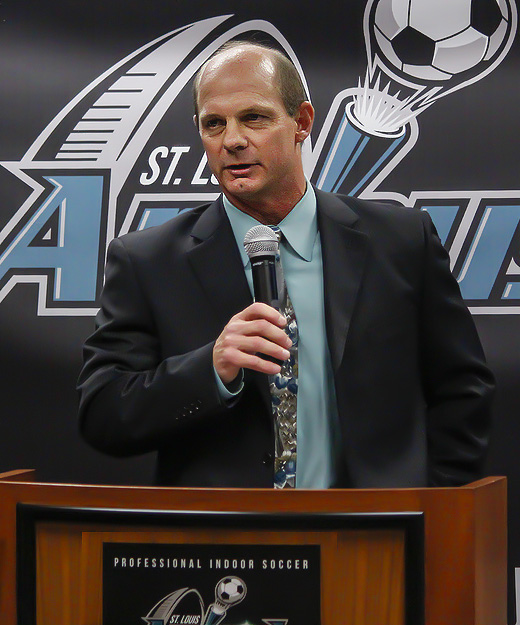
Former Ambush head coach Daryl Doran.

- (United States) Daryl Doran (2013–2015)
- (Scotland) Tony Glavin (2015–2017)
- (Brazil) Hewerton Moreira (2017–2021)
- (United States) Greg Muhr (2021)
- (United States) Jeff Locker (2021–present)

Following a 2–4 start to the 21–22 season, Greg Muhr resigned as head coach of the Ambush. The role was filled by co-owner and general manager, Jeff Locker.
