= Seattle Impact =

Seattle Impact FC
- Full name: Seattle Impact FC
- Founded: 2014
- Dissolved: 2015
- Ground: ShoWare Center; 625 West James Street; Kent, Washington 98032
- Capacity: 6,500
- Coordinates: 47°23′18″N 122°14′24″W
- Owner: Dion Earl
- Head Coach: Dion Earl
- League: Major Arena Soccer League
- Website: http://www.seattleimpactfc.com

Seattle Impact FC was an American professional indoor soccer team that began play as a member of the Major Arena Soccer League with its 2014-15 season. Based in Seattle, Washington, the Impact played its home games at the ShoWare Center in nearby Kent. After struggles on and off the field, the team's assets were sold mid-season to Lane Smith whose Tacoma Stars completed Seattle's scheduled 2015 regular season games.

== History ==
Originally, the team was going to be named the Tacoma Stars, in honor of the original Stars which played in the original Major Indoor Soccer League from 1983 until the league folded in 1992. However, because of a legal dispute with the Tacoma Soccer Center over ownership of said name, owner Dion Earl abandoned these plans, choosing instead to name the team Seattle Impact FC (Seattle to represent the greater metropolitan area which also included Tacoma and Kent, and Impact at his wife's suggestion).

Jason Dunn, an Olympia native who played college soccer for Washington and Seattle Pacific and later for the American Professional Soccer League's Seattle Sounders and the indoor Seattle SeaDogs, was set to serve as the Impact's inaugural head coach. Just before the regular season started, Dunn and assistant coach Todd Haley left the team after the Impact failed to make contractual payments due on October 25. Impact owner Dion Earl announced that he will serve as head coach as well as continue his role as a player.

The planned "Ladies with Impact" dance team disbanded when several members resigned after alleging that Impact owner Dion Earl made sexual advances towards them. The dancers also claimed that the team had not paid them for their work. The dance team's former co-captain obtained a sexual harassment protection order against Earl from King County Superior Court Judge Chad Allred on October 22. A large number of the players contracted to Impact quit in protest. Earl denied the claims. Although no criminal charges were filed, Earl subsequently lost a civil suit brought by four former employees in a default judgment after he refused to attend the trial.

On January 12, 2015, The Seattle Times revealed that Impact owner Dion Earl was negotiating to sell the struggling franchise to Lane Smith, owner of the Tacoma Stars of the semi-pro Western Indoor Soccer League. The Impact sold the rights to its top players for cash during the negotiation period. The sale was completed on January 14, with Smith acquiring the team's assets but not the staff or player roster. The Tacoma Stars took over the Impact's remaining schedule and played their MASL home games at the ShoWare Center while continuing to also compete in the Western Indoor Soccer League.

== Year-by-year ==
League champions	Runners-up	Division champions*	Playoff berth

Year	League	Record	GF	GA	Finish	Playoffs	Avg. attendance
2014–15	MASL	3–10	92	138	6th, Pacific	NA	739
