= Tacoma Stars =

- Founded: 2003; 23 years ago
- Stadium: accesso ShoWare Center, Kent, Washington Bellarmine Preparatory School, Tacoma, Washington
- Capacity: 6,500
- Chairman: Lane Smith
- Coach: Adam Becker
- League: USL League Two; Major Arena Soccer League
- 2025: 9th. of Northwest Division (no playoffs)
- Website: tacomastars.com
Home colors	Away colors

The Tacoma Stars are an American professional indoor soccer team based in Tacoma, Washington, that competes in the Major Arena Soccer League (MASL). The franchise also operates in USL League Two, a minor outdoor league. Founded in 2003, the indoor team plays its home games at ShoWare Center in Kent, Washington. First playing in 2024, the outdoor men's team and outdoor women's team, the "Tacoma Galaxy", play home games at Bellarmine Preparatory School in Tacoma.

The club also fields an indoor women's side under the Tacoma Galaxy name. The club fields two reserve teams both with the name Tacoma Stars Reserves, in the indoor WISL junior league, and the outdoor youth Cascadia Premier League.

== History ==
The Stars were founded in 2003 as a member of the Premier Arena Soccer League (PASL-Premier). The team is named after the Tacoma Stars that played in the original Major Indoor Soccer League from 1983 to 1992. The Stars won two PASL-Premier Championships (Summer 2004 & Winter 2009-2010).

The Stars made the transition to professional status and joined the Professional Arena Soccer League (PASL) for the 2010-11 season. In 2012–13 season, the head coach was Joe Waters as the team moved into the new Pacific Sports Center.

The Stars went on hiatus on August 23, 2013. An amateur version of the club participated in the Premier Arena Soccer League as the "Tacoma Galaxy" in the 2013-14 season. On January 10, 2014, the Pacific Sports Center was placed into receivership, putting the future of the facility and the franchise in question.

In June 2014, it was announced that the Tacoma Stars would return to play in the Western Indoor Soccer League (WISL) at the Tacoma Soccer Center.

In January 2015, team owner Lane Smith acquired the assets of the failed Seattle Impact of the Major Arena Soccer League and announced that the Stars would complete the Impact's 2014–15 season at the ShoWare Center in Kent, Washington, while completing their WISL obligations.

The Stars joined the National Premier Soccer League in 2020, and planned to field an outdoor team in the Northwest Conference through a partnership with Washington Premier FC. The outdoor team planned to play at Washington Premier FC Field in Waller, Washington, near Puyallup. Due to the COVID-19 pandemic NPSL halted play in the 2020 season, and the Northwest division did not play in 2021. Tacoma left NPSL in 2022 without having played a match.

In 2023, the Tacoma Stars won the North American Sand Soccer U.S. Men's Open Division Championship in Virginia Beach, Virginia, with a 3-2 victory over Maryzillians in the final. The team, which went 6-0 in the tournament, included Nick Perera, Cory Keitz, and Fellipe Souza, along with former players Chris Toth, Alessandro Canale, and Mike Palmerin. Perera was named the Tournament MVP, and Toth received the Top Goalkeeper award. Tacoma Stars won the tournament in 2026.

On January 4, 2024, the Tacoma Stars was announced as an expansion team for the outdoor USL League Two, joining the Northwest Division. The team will play their home matches at Bellarmine Preparatory School in Tacoma. An affiliated women's team, named the Tacoma Galaxy, will play in the USL W League beginning in 2024.

Men's pro indoor leaders (Regular and Post)
Appearances	Raphael Cox - 112	Danny Waltman - 109	Chase Hanson - 104
Points	Nick Perera - 177	Mike Ramos - 146	Raphael Cox - 86
Goals	Nick Perera - 94	Mike Ramos - 91	Raphael Cox - 61
Assists	Nick Perera - 84	Mike Ramos - 55	Raphael Cox - 34
Saves	Danny Waltman - 2175	Piotr Silwa - 190	Chris Kintz - 175
Fouls	Vince Mcluskey - 154	Nick Perera - 119	Mike Ramos - 99

== Year-by-year ==
League champions	Runners-up	Division champions	Playoff berth

Year	League	Record	GF	GA	Finish	Playoffs	Avg. attendance	U.S. Open Cup
2003	PASL							
2004	PASL	4–0–0	56	26	1st, Northwest	Won Championship		
2004–05	PASL	6–2–0	64	34	2nd, Northwest	Eliminated in National Round Robin	138	
2005–06	PASL	3–4–0	32	36	4th, Northwest	Suspended		
2006–07	PASL	10–1–0	101	40	1st, Northwest	Lost National Elimination		
2007–08	PASL	5–5–2	187	149	4th, Northwest	Lost Division Final		
2008–09	PASL-Premier	7–0–1	56	31	1st, Northwest	Lost National Semifinal		Lost semifinal
2009–10	PASL-Premier	6–1–1	50	25	1st, Northwest	Won Championship		Lost Round of 16
2010–11	PASL-Pro	10–6	110	104	2nd, Western	Lost quarterfinal	331	Lost semifinal
2011–12	PASL	3–13	92	150	5th, Western	Did not qualify	242	Lost quarterfinal
2012–13	PASL	8–7	116	136	3rd, Pacific	Did not qualify	314	Lost quarterfinal
2013–14	PASL-Premier	6–0–2	55	33	1st, Northwest	Eliminated in National Group Play		
2014–15	WISL	8–0–0	67	25	1st, WISL	Won Championship		
2014–15^{1}	MASL	4–16	120	215	5th, Pacific	Did not qualify	1,038	
2015–16^{2}	MASL	13–7	116	109	3rd, Pacific	Lost Division Semifinals	2,475	
2016–17	MASL	10–10	114	120	3rd, Pacific	Did not qualify	2,894	
2017–18	MASL	11–11	134	134	2nd, Pacific	Lost Division Finals	2,635	
2018–19	MASL	12–12	162	143	2nd, Pacific	Lost Division Finals	2,672	
2019–20	MASL	8–12	112	124	5th, Western	Did not qualify	2,519	
2021	MASL	4–7	53	62	6th, MASL	Lost quarterfinals	NHG*	
2021-22	MASL	6-18	135	192	4th, West	Did Not Quality	1,200	
2022-23	MASL	12-12	155	139	4th, West	Lost Western Conference play-in	1,175	
2023-24	MASL	16-8	164	143	3rd, West	Lost in Conference Semifinals	1,199	
2024-25	MASL	10-14	131	153	9th	Did Not Qualify	1,502	
2025-26	MASL	9-15	118	174	7th	Did Not Qualify	1,408	

^{1} Completing last 7 games of 20-game season after taking over for the Seattle Impact.

^{2} First full season competing in MASL.

* The Stars had no home games due to the COVID-19 pandemic.

=== Professional playoffs ===
Year	Won	Lost	GF	GA	Avg. attendance
2011	0	1	6	9	NHG
2016	0	2	10	19	2,036
2018	1	2	10	17	2,386
2019	0	2	9	13	2,412
2021	0	2	10	12	NHG*
2024	0	1	6	9	1,114

* The Stars had no home games due to the COVID-19 pandemic.

=== Tournament victories ===
U.S. Men's Open - North American Sand Soccer Championship (NASSC)

- 2023
- 2026

== Personnel ==
=== Active players ===
As of 2026.

Note: Flags indicate national team as defined under FIFA eligibility rules; some limited exceptions apply. Players may hold more than one non-FIFA nationality.

No.	Pos.	Nation	Player
0	GK	USA	Luis Birrueta
1	GK	USA	Danny Waltman
2	DF	USA	Chase Hanson
4	FW	USA	Logan Jones
5	MF	USA	Kyle Rivers
7	DF	USA	Alex Caceres
9	FW	GUM	Eddie Na
11	MF	USA	Jamael Cox
12	DF	USA	Nestor Hernandez
13	MF	USA	Nick Cashmere
14	DF	USA	Tyler John
16	GK	USA	Michael Herrera
17	MF	USA	Cale Spence
20	DF	USA	Evan McNeley

No.	Pos.	Nation	Player
22	MF	USA	Nani Mendoza
24	DF	USA	Khai Brisco
25	FW	USA	Mike Ramos
26	MF	USA	Ismael Deluna
29	DF	PAN	Roman Torres
30	MF	BRA	Douglas Lima
33	MF	USA	Adrian Correa
34	DF	USA	Manny Nicasio
80	MF	USA	Manny Nicasio
90	FW	USA	Cristian Fernandes
93	DF	USA	Missael Lopez
99	GK	USA	Austin Rogers

== Venues ==
Venue	City	Type	Team	League	Years
Tacoma Soccer Center	Tacoma	Indoor	Tacoma Stars	PASL-Premier, PASL	2004-2011, 2013-2014, 2014-2015
Tacoma Soccer Center	Tacoma	Indoor	Tacoma Stars Reserves	WISL	
Tacoma Soccer Center	Tacoma	Indoor	Tacoma Galaxy	WISLW	
Starfire Sports Complex	Tukwila	Indoor	Tacoma Stars	PASL	2011-2012
Pacific Sports Center	Tacoma	Indoor	Tacoma Stars	PASL	2012-2013
accesso ShoWare Center	Kent	Indoor	Tacoma Stars	MASL	2015-
Bellarmine Preparatory School	Tacoma	Outdoor	Tacoma Stars	USL2	2024-
Bellarmine Preparatory School	Tacoma	Outdoor	Tacoma Galaxy	USL-W	2024-
Curtis Senior High School	University Place	Outdoor	Tacoma Stars Reserves	CPL	

1. As Tacoma Galaxy
2. Starfire has both indoor and outdoor facilities.
3. ShoWare is primarily a hockey arena.
