= Sacramento Surge (soccer) =

Sacramento Surge Professional Indoor Soccer
- Founded: 2012
- Dissolved: 2016
- Stadium: McClellan Park; Sacramento, California
- Capacity: 2,000
- League: Major Arena Soccer League
- 2015–16: 5th, Pacific Division; Playoffs: DNQ
- Website: http://www.sacsurge.com
Home colors

Sacramento Surge were an American professional indoor soccer team based in Sacramento, California. They joined the Professional Arena Soccer League on September 7, 2012. Their colors are blue and gold. As of May 2014, the league is known as the Major Arena Soccer League.

The team played its 2012–13 season home matches at the Off The Wall Soccer Arena in Sacramento. For the 2013–14 season, they relocated to Estadio Azteca Soccer Arena, also in Sacramento. For the 2014–15 season, the team moved to a purpose-built arena at Jackson Sports Academy in McClellan Park. For the 2015–16 season, the team then moved back to Estadio Azteca Soccer Arena.

== Year-by-year ==
League champions	Runners-up	Division champions*	Playoff berth

Year	League	Reg. season	GF	GA	Finish	Playoffs	Avg. attendance
2012–13	PASL	1-14	58	149	5th, Pacific	Did not qualify	1039
2013–14	PASL	3-13	92	179	7th, Pacific	Did not qualify	1578
2014–15	MASL	3-11	90	139	6th, Pacific	Did not qualify	1346
2015–16	MASL	3-17	98	174	5th, Pacific	Did not qualify	1398
