= Turlock Cal Express =

American professional indoor soccer team based in Turlock, California

- Turlock Express Logo
- Founded: 2011
- Stadium: Turlock Indoor Soccer; Turlock, California
- Capacity: 700
- Coach: Art Pulido
- League: Major Arena Soccer League 2
- Website: http://www.turlockexpress.com/
Home colors	Away colors

Turlock Cal Express is an American professional indoor soccer team based in Turlock, California. They joined the Major Arena Soccer League (then Professional Arena Soccer League) in 2011 and are currently members of the Major Arena Soccer League 2. The team is owned and coached by Arturo "Art" Pulido.

== Year-by-year ==
Year	League	Record	GF	GA	Finish	Playoffs	Avg. attendance
2011–12	PASL	10–6	129	128	3rd of 6, Western	Lost, 4–5 vs Revolución Tijuana	269
2012–13	PASL	9-7	150	127	2nd of 5, Western	Lost, 0–2 vs San Diego Sockers	403
2013–14	PASL	5-11	93	120	5th of 7, Pacific	Did not qualify	521
2014–15	MASL	9–11	145	149	4th of 6, Pacific	Did not qualify	502
2015–16	MASL	3–17	98	174	6th of 6, Southwest	Did not qualify	416
2016–17	MASL	8–12	132	172	4th of 4, Pacific	Did not qualify	556
2017–18	MASL	3–19	111	188	4th of 4, Pacific	Did not qualify	428
2018–19	MASL	3–21	101	215	4th of 4, Pacific	Did not qualify	469
2019–20	MASL	8–12	112	128	6th of 8, Western	Did not qualify	377
2021–22	MASL2	2–10	50	129	4th of 4, West	Did not qualify	

== Personnel ==
As of November 27, 2019.

=== Active players ===
Note: Flags indicate national team as defined under FIFA eligibility rules; some limited exceptions apply. Players may hold more than one non-FIFA nationality.

No.	Pos.	Nation	Player
1	GK	USA	Edgar Martinez
3	DF	MEX	Juan Manuel Rojo
4	FW	USA	Cristian Valadez
9	MF	USA	Arturo Pulido
10	MF	USA	Adrian Gutierrez (Captain)
11	DF	USA	Adrian Pulido
12	FW	USA	Jorge Carmona
14	MF	USA	Martyn Arista
19	DF	USA	Matthew Germain
24	FW	USA	Ivan Campos
25	GK	USA	Martin Sanchez

No.	Pos.	Nation	Player
28	MF	USA	Ivan Rios
29	MF	USA	Adrian Plascencia
30	GK	BRA	Sanaldo Carvalho
31	FW	USA	Anibal Echeverria
35	DF	USA	Matt Max
58	DF	USA	Selvin Bonilla
77	DF	USA	Juan Gonzalez
80	MF	USA	Luis Brambila
96	MF	USA	Julio Varela
97	FW	USA	Joaquin Raya

== Staff ==
- Head coach: Arturo Pulido
- Assistant coach: Edgar Martinez
- General Manager: Matt Warner
- Director of Operations: Cristy Pulido
- Owners: Arturo Pulido and Matt Warner
