= 2007–08 Tulsa Revolution season =

Tulsa Revolution
2007–08 AISL season
- Owner: Adam Mellor
- Head Coach: Kerry Shubert
- Arena: SoccerCity Tulsa; 5817 S. 118th East Ave; Tulsa, Oklahoma

The 2007–08 Tulsa Revolution season was the first season of the Tulsa Revolution professional indoor soccer club. The Revolution, a short-season expansion team in the final year of the American Indoor Soccer League, played their home games at SoccerCity Tulsa in Tulsa, Oklahoma. They amassed only a 2–5 record but drew well at the box office, falling dormant only after the league folded in late 2008.

== History ==
The team was led by owner Adam Mellor, head coach Kerry Shubert, and assistant coach Tama Aondofar.

The Revolution played 7 games of an abbreviated 8-game schedule, winning 2 and losing 5. (The game at Rockford was cancelled.) These matches counted in the league's rankings but left the team ineligible for post-season play. The first goal in Revolution history was scored by Michael Poneys.

The Revolution made XanGo energy drink the team's official beverage for the 2007–08 season.

== Roster moves ==
The Revolution's initial 22-man roster included players from Bolivia, Brazil, Laos, Liberia, Nigeria, Zaire, and across the Tulsa area. The prime goalkeeper was indoor veteran Sonny Dalesandro. Dalesandro persevered through a broken toe during the team's third game, a 7-6 win against Massachusetts, but missed the remainder of the season.

Other initial players included Dave Leung from Jamaica plus Christopher Justice and Garba Lawal, both natives of Nigeria with international match play experience. Lawal was part of the gold medal-winning Nigerian team at the 1996 Summer Olympics in Atlanta.

In mid-January, the team released defender Tou Yer Yang and signed forwards Dominique Nayaga and Todd Goddard During the January 26th game against the Massachusetts Twisters, Kerry Shubert drew a red card penalty and a one-game disciplinary suspension. Late in the season, the team signed forward Todd Goddard, a native of Tulsa and a former member of the University of Tulsa's men's soccer team.

== Schedule ==
Win Tie Loss No Game

=== Regular season ===
Game	Day	Date	Kickoff	Opponent	Results		Location
Game	Day	Date	Kickoff	Opponent	Final score	Record	Location
1	Saturday	January 5	7:30pm	Cincinnati Excite	L 4–5	0–1	SoccerCity Tulsa
2	Saturday	January 12	7:30pm	Rockford Rampage	L 5–7	0–2	SoccerCity Tulsa
3	Saturday	January 26	7:30pm	at Massachusetts Twisters	W 7–6	1–2	Eastern States Coliseum
4	Saturday	February 2	7:30pm	Massachusetts Twisters	L 7–14	1–3	SoccerCity Tulsa
5	Saturday	February 9	7:30pm	at Northern Illinois Rebels	L 2–4	1–4	Lake County Sports Center
6	Sunday	February 10	1:00pm	at Rockford Rampage	CANCELLED		Victory Sports Arena
7	Saturday	February 16	7:30pm	at Cincinnati Excite	L 8–10	1–5	Game Time Training Center
8	Sunday	February 24	2:00pm	Northern Illinois Rebels	W 11–9	2–5	SoccerCity Tulsa

== Awards and honors ==
For his work with youth soccer, head coach Kerry Shubert was named 2008 "Competitive Girl's Coach of the Year" by the Oklahoma Soccer Association. Shubert had also been the OSA's 2007 Coach of the Year.

== Aftermath ==
The new team struggled on the field, winning just 2 games versus 5 losses. However, the team drew well, nearly 700 fans per game, and prepared to move to the Expo Square Pavilion for a 2008–09 season that was not to be. The Cincinnati Excite opted to sit out the 2008–09 season, the Rockford Rampage moved to the new National Indoor Soccer League, and the Massachusetts Twisters were put up for sale then followed Rockford to the NISL. With only the Revolution and the Northern Illinois Rebels remaining, the league folded in September 2008. The Revolution would lie dormant until winning an expansion franchise to join the Professional Arena Soccer League for its 2013–14 season.
