= 2012–13 Rockford Rampage season =

Rockford Rampage
2012–13 PASL season
- Owner: Saul Robles
- Head Coach: Jeff Kraft
- Arena: Victory Sports Complex; Loves Park, Illinois
- PASL: 4th, Central
- US Open Cup: Wild Card Round
- Highest home attendance: 485 (November 24, 2012) vs Chicago Mustangs
- Lowest home attendance: 200 (multiple games)
- Average home league attendance: 286 (over 8 home games)

The 2012–13 Rockford Rampage season was the first and only season of the new Rockford Rampage indoor soccer club. The Rampage, a Central Division team in the Professional Arena Soccer League, played their home games in the Victory Sports Complex in Loves Park, Illinois. The team was led by owner Saul Robles, head coach Jeff Kraft, and assistant coach Armando Sanchez.

== Season summary ==
The team had mixed results in the regular season. The Rampage started the season with a four-game win streak but stumbled as the team's best players were signed by the Chicago Soul of the Major Indoor Soccer League. Ultimately, the team finished 7–9 and failed to qualify for the postseason.

The Rampage participated in the 2012–13 United States Open Cup for Arena Soccer. They lost to the Chicago Mustangs in the Wild Card round, abruptly ending their run in the tournament.

== History ==
The previous indoor soccer franchise, founded in 2005 as the Rockford Thunder, was initially a member of the American Indoor Soccer League. They played home games at the Victory Sports Complex in Loves Park, Illinois. In August 2007, the team changed its name to "Rockford Rampage" to accommodate a women's fastpitch softball team, the Texas Thunder, which relocated to Rockford. The Rampage won the 2007–08 AISL Championship but the league folded soon after the season.

In 2008, the Rampage became a founding member of the National Indoor Soccer League and relocated to the Rockford MetroCentre in downtown Rockford, Illinois. The team continued in that league (renamed "Major Indoor Soccer League" in 2009) until going on hiatus in October 2010. Current Rampage head coach Jeff Kraft also led these previous incarnations of the team. The new Rockford Rampage joined the Professional Arena Soccer League in August 2012.

== Off-field moves ==
In November 2012, the Rampage signed a marketing agreement that made Radioactive Energy Drink the team's "presenting sponsor" for this season. The beverage's logo was featured on the front of the team's uniform jerseys.

== Roster moves ==
The team held an open tryout at the Victory Sports Complex on Saturday, September 22, 2012.

== Awards and honors ==
On November 13, 2012, Rampage goalkeeper Ante Cop was named PASL Player of the Week for helping lead the team to a 3-0 start and for excellent defensive goalkeeping.

== Schedule ==
Win Tie Loss

=== Regular season ===
Game	Day	Date	Kickoff	Opponent	Results		Location	Attendance
Game	Day	Date	Kickoff	Opponent	Final Score	Record	Location	Attendance
1	Saturday	November 3	7:35pm	at Ohio Vortex	W 6–1	1–0	Gameday Sports Center	311
2	Friday	November 9	7:35pm	at Illinois Piasa	W 10–7	2–0	The Sports Academy	178
3	Saturday	November 10	7:00pm	at Cincinnati Kings	W 4–1	3–0	GameTime Training Center	210
4	Saturday	November 24	7:05pm	Chicago Mustangs	W 7–6	4–0	Victory Sports Complex	485
5	Saturday	December 8	4:30pm	at Chicago Mustangs†	L 7–8 (OT)	4–1	Grand Sports Arena	459
6	Sunday	December 9	3:35pm	at Illinois Piasa	L 2–5	4–2	The Sports Academy	188
7	Sunday	December 16	6:00pm	at Rio Grande Valley Flash	L 1–7	4–3	State Farm Arena	1,357
8	Saturday	December 22	8:05pm	Texas Strikers	W 16–5	5–3	Victory Sports Complex	266
9	Saturday	December 29	7:05pm	Rio Grande Valley Flash	L 2–3	5–4	Victory Sports Complex	322
10	Saturday	January 5	7:05pm	Dallas Sidekicks	L 4–11	5–5	Victory Sports Complex	283
11	Saturday	January 12	7:05pm	Illinois Piasa	W 8–1	6–5	Victory Sports Complex	200
12	Saturday	January 19	7:05pm	Chicago Mustangs	L 5–8	6–6	Victory Sports Complex	338
13	Saturday	January 26	7:05pm	Detroit Waza	L 10–14	6–7	Victory Sports Complex	200
14	Saturday	February 2	7:05pm	Harrisburg Heat	W 5–3	7–7	Victory Sports Complex	200
15	Saturday	February 9	7:00pm	at Dallas Sidekicks	L 5–14	7–8	Allen Event Center	5,499
16	Sunday	February 10	3:05pm	at Texas Strikers	L 8–9	7–9	Ford Arena	409

† Game also counts for US Open Cup, as listed in chart below.

=== 2012–13 US Open Cup for Arena Soccer ===
Game	Date	Kickoff	Opponent	Results		Location	Attendance
Game	Date	Kickoff	Opponent	Final Score	Team Record	Location	Attendance
Wild Card	December 8	4:30pm	at Chicago Mustangs	L 7–8	0–1	Grand Sports Arena	459
