= 2013–14 Tulsa Revolution season =

Tulsa Revolution
2013–14 PASL season
- Owners: Adam Mellor; Shannon Clark
- Head Coach: Michael Nsien
- Arena: Cox Business Center; 100 Civic Center; Tulsa, Oklahoma 74103
- Highest home attendance: 1,007 (December 28 vs. Texas Strikers)
- Lowest home attendance: 664 (January 31 vs. Chicago Mustangs)
- Average home league attendance: 866 (8 games)

The 2013–14 Tulsa Revolution season was the first season of the revived Tulsa Revolution professional indoor soccer club. The Tulsa Revolution, a Central Division team in the Professional Arena Soccer League, played their home games in the Cox Business Center in Tulsa, Oklahoma.

The team was led by team owners Adam Mellor and Shannon Clark, head coach Michael Nsien, and assistant coaches John Michael Waite and Christian Porto. The team's cheer squad, led by Stephanie Wykoff, is known as the "Ladies of Liberty".

== Season summary ==
Tulsa struggled in their first PASL season, losing three straight road games before their home opener against Hidalgo La Fiera. Tulsa took La Fiera to overtime but lost 6–7 then dropped four more matches, splitting the losses between home and road contests. Tulsa's first win of the year came in their last game of 2013, a 13–8 victory over the Texas Strikers. Tulsa began 2014 with four more losses and ultimately finished the season with a 2–14 record.

The Revolution participated in the 2013–14 United States Open Cup for Arena Soccer starting with a scheduled Wild Card round game against an independent team BH United. Originally to be played on Friday, December 6, 2013, the game was postponed to Sunday, December 22, 2013, then postponed again due to severe winter weather. The game was declared a forfeit and the Revolution advanced to the Round of 32 where they defeated the independent Tulsa Tea Men 6–2 on January 12. The January 25 regular season 9–10 loss to the Wichita B-52s served as the Round of 16 game for both teams, ending Tulsa's tournament run.

== History ==
An earlier iteration of the Tulsa Revolution, also owned by Adam Mellor, played for a portion of the 2007-08 season in the American Indoor Soccer League (AISL). That team struggled on the field but was planning for a full season in 2008–09 when the AISL folded.

The Tulsa Revolution name lay dormant until July 10, 2012, when Adam Mellor and Shannon Clark were awarded a franchise as owners of an expansion team in the Professional Arena Soccer League for the 2013–14 season.

== Off-field moves ==
After reaching a deal to plays its home games at the Cox Business Center (formerly known as the Tulsa Convention Center), the team named Michael Nsien as head coach on July 2, 2013, and announced the Williams Companies as presenting sponsor for the 2013–14 season. In early November 2013, the team signed a three-year contract with the Muscogee (Creek) Nation and the River Spirit Casino as co-sponsors of the team. Each sponsor has their logo displayed on the arena turf.

The team placed single-game tickets for sale on October 24, 2013, for all nine scheduled home games with the home opener scheduled for November 22, 2013, when Tulsa hosted fellow expansion team Hidalgo La Fiera. As of early November 2013, the team had sold just over 200 season tickets.

== Roster moves ==
The Revolution held open player tryouts in July 2013 with the goal of filling out a 20-man active roster for the upcoming season. The team began signing players in October 2013, starting with Tulsa native Levi Coleman, in preparation for their first game on November 1 versus the Illinois Piasa.

Other key player signings in October included professional futsal player Savid Parente Devignaud from Portugal, Broken Arrow native Thomas Shannon, former Puerto Rico National Team player and Ohio Vortex veteran David Joshua Marrero "Josh" Danza, and forward Franck Tayou who played for the Las Vegas Legends last season.

== Schedule ==
Win Loss

=== Regular season ===
| Game | Day | Date | Kickoff | Opponent | Results | | Location | Attendance |
| Game | Day | Date | Kickoff | Opponent | Score | Record | Location | Attendance |
|---|---|---|---|---|---|---|---|---|
| 1 | Friday | November 1 | 7:35pm | at Illinois Piasa | L 4–7 | 0–1 | Field Sports Complex | 496 |
| 2 | Saturday | November 2 | 4:05pm | at Chicago Mustangs | L 5–10 | 0–2 | Odeum Expo Center | 833 |
| 3 | Saturday | November 16 | 7:05pm | at Dallas Sidekicks | L 5–7 | 0–3 | Allen Event Center | 3,392 |
| 4 | Friday | November 22 | 7:05pm | Hidalgo La Fiera | L 6–7 (OT) | 0–4 | Cox Business Center | 898 |
| 5 | Friday | December 13 | 7:05pm | Saltillo Rancho Seco | L 7–8 | 0–5 | Cox Business Center | 864 |
| 6 | Saturday | December 14 | 7:05pm | at Wichita B-52s | L 2–9 | 0–6 | Hartman Arena | 1,691 |
| 7 | Saturday | December 21 | 2:05pm | Dallas Sidekicks | L 6–8 | 0–7 | Cox Business Center | 783 |
| 8 | Friday | December 27 | 7:35pm | at Dallas Sidekicks | L 8–13 | 0–8 | Allen Event Center | 4,322 |
| 9 | Saturday | December 28 | 6:05pm | Texas Strikers | W 13–8 | 1–8 | Cox Business Center | 1,007 |
| 10 | Friday | January 10 | 7:05pm | at Wichita B-52s | L 2–4 | 1–9 | Hartman Arena | 1,424 |
| 11 | Saturday | January 18 | 6:05pm | Dallas Sidekicks | L 2–13 | 1–10 | Cox Business Center | 1,042 |
| 12 | Saturday | January 25 | 6:05pm | Wichita B-52s† | L 9–10 | 1–11 | Cox Business Center | 805 |
| 13 | Friday | January 31 | 7:05pm | Chicago Mustangs | L 9–16 | 1–12 | Cox Business Center | 664 |
| 14 | Friday | February 7 | 7:05pm | Wichita B-52s | W 6–4 | 2–12 | Cox Business Center | 865 |
| 15 | Saturday | February 15 | 7:05pm | at Texas Strikers | L 3–11 | 2–13 | Ford Arena | 277 |
| 16 | Sunday | February 16 | 5:05pm | at Hidalgo La Fiera | L 2–23 | 2–14 | State Farm Arena | 512 |

† Game also counts for US Open Cup, as listed in chart below.

=== U.S. Open Cup for Arena Soccer ===
| Round | Day | Date | Kickoff | Opponent | Results | | Location | Attendance |
| Round | Day | Date | Kickoff | Opponent | Score | Record | Location | Attendance |
|---|---|---|---|---|---|---|---|---|
| Wild Card | Sunday | December 22 | 10:00am | BH United (Independent) | W 3–0 (by forfeit) | 1–0 | Soccer City OKC | N/A |
| Round of 32 | Sunday | January 12 | 10:00am | Tulsa Tea Men (Independent) | W 6–2 | 2–0 | Soccer City Tulsa | |
| Round of 16 | Saturday | January 25 | 6:05pm | Wichita B-52s | L 9–10 | 2–1 | Cox Business Center | 805 |

== Personnel ==
=== Player roster ===
As of November 1, 2013 Note: Flags indicate national team as defined under FIFA eligibility rules; some limited exceptions apply. Players may hold more than one non-FIFA nationality.

| No. | Pos. | Nation | Player |
|---|---|---|---|
| 1 | GK | GBR | Lewis Amos |
| 2 | DF | PUR | Josh Danza |
| 3 | DF | JAM | Sheldon Barrett |
| 4 | DF | USA | Thomas Shannon |
| 5 | DF | USA | David Kamali |
| 6 | MF | USA | Adam "Sambo" Claros |
| 7 | MF | USA | Bryce Taylor |
| 8 | MF | LBR | Michael Poneys |
| 9 | FW | USA | Levi Coleman |
| 10 | MF | POR | David Parente |

| No. | Pos. | Nation | Player |
|---|---|---|---|
| 11 | MF | USA | Tyrell Jackson |
| 13 | FW | MEX | Victor Perralta |
| 14 | MF | SYR | Abed El-Kour |
| 15 | MF | CMR | Franck Tayou |
| 16 | DF | USA | Sam Guernsey |
| 17 | FW | USA | Bryant Scrapper |
| 18 | FW | BFA | Dominic Nayaga |
| 20 | DF | Nigeria | Baba Ugbah |
| 21 | FW | USA | Gunnar Kelly |
| 22 | GK | Lebanon | Habib Zaylaa |

=== Staff ===
The ownership group during this inaugural season include Adam C. Mellor and Shannon T. Clark. The team's head coach is Michael Nsien II. Assistant coaches under Nsien are John Michael Waite and Christian Porto. The team doctor is Dr. Breck Kasbaum, DC and the team legal counsel is Marvin G. Lizama, Esq. Special events are coordinated by Dirk Johnson and Jeff Brucculeri is in charge of media relations. The "Ladies of Liberty" cheer squad is led by Stephanie Wykoff as Cheer Director.
