= 2014–15 Tulsa Revolution season =

Tulsa Revolution
2014–15 MASL season
- Owners: Adam Mellor; Shannon Clark
- Head Coach: David Yates (games 1–10); Alex Miranda (games 11–20)
- Arena: Expo Square Pavilion; 4145 East 21st Street; Tulsa, Oklahoma 74114
- Major Arena Soccer League: 6th, Central (regular season)
- Top goalscorer: Lucas Almeida (23 goals, 19 assists)
- Highest home attendance: 562 (November 14 vs. Oxford City FC of Texas)
- Lowest home attendance: 197 (February 20 vs. St. Louis Ambush)
- Average home league attendance: 408 (8/9 games)

The 2014–15 Tulsa Revolution season was the second season of the revived Tulsa Revolution professional indoor soccer club. The Revolution, a Central Division team in the Major Arena Soccer League, played their 2014 home games at the Cox Business Center in downtown Tulsa. They relocated mid-season and played their 2015 home games in the Expo Square Pavilion at the Tulsa State Fairgrounds in Tulsa, Oklahoma.

The team is led by team owners Adam Mellor and Shannon Clark, interim head coach Alex Miranda, and goalkeeper coach Matt Chronister. The team's cheer squad, led by Rachel Masterson, is known as the "Ladies of Liberty" but inactive this season. David Yates led the team to a 1–9 record as head coach in the first half of the season. The Revolution finished the season with a 2–18 record, placing them 6th in the Central and out of the post-season.

== Season summary ==
The Revolution began the year on an even keel, opening with a road loss to the Wichita B-52s then a home opener win over Oxford City FC of Texas. However, the team lost its next 8 straight games, home and road, then postponed a scheduled December 27 home game against the B-52s while the Revolution sought to relocate from the Cox Business Center to a less expensive venue. On January 14, the team released first-year head coach David Yates after he led the team to a 1–9 record. On January 20, assistant coach Alex Miranda was named interim head coach for the rest of the season. While turf issues forced a cancellation and forfeit of the January 24 match against the Chicago Mustangs at the Revolution's new home arena, Expo Square Pavilion, they were resolved before the January 30 match against Saltillo Rancho Seco and the season continued. They beat Saltillo but lost their remaining six games to finish 2–18 on the season and sixth in the six-team Central Division.

== History ==
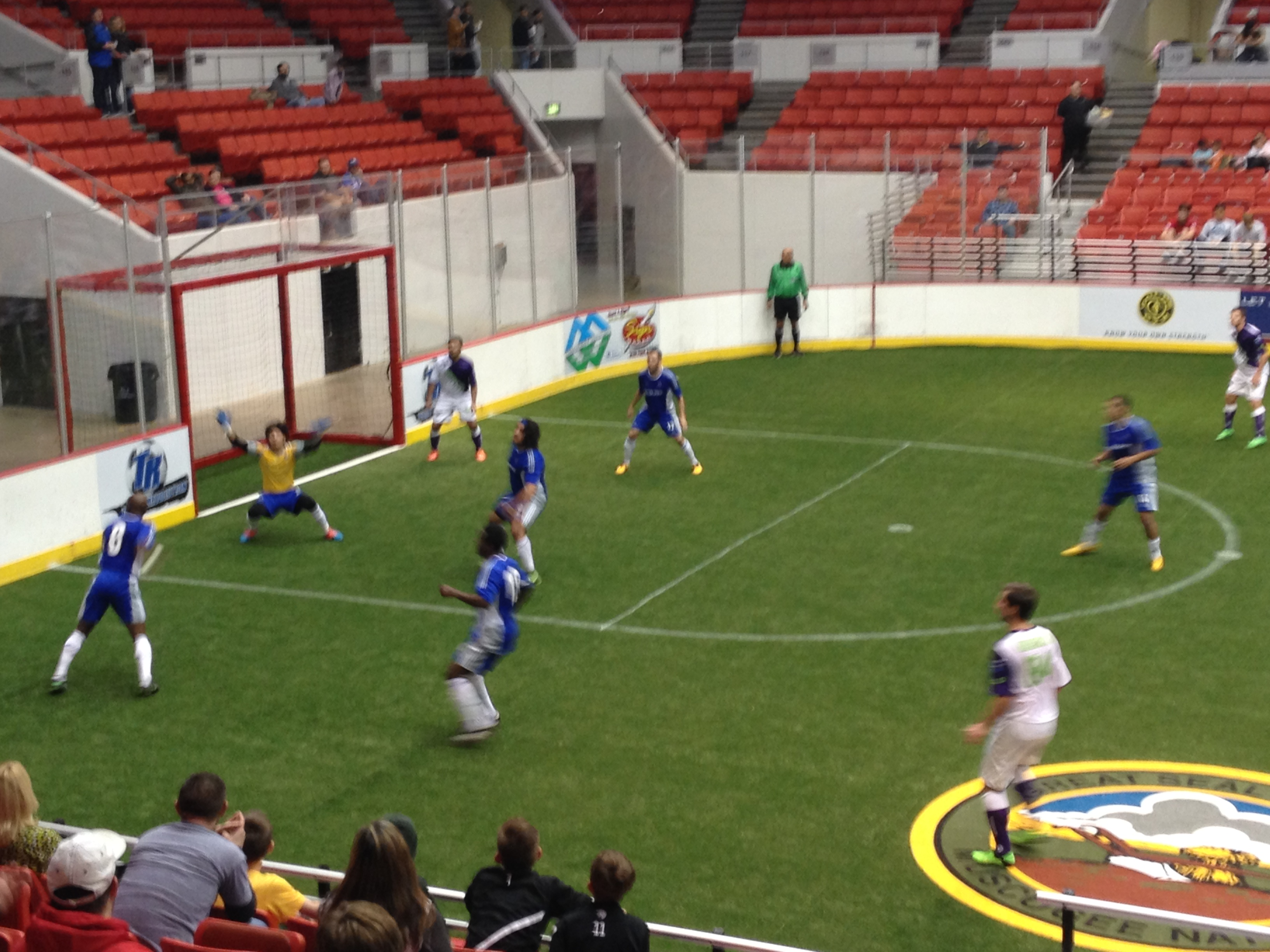
Revolution hosting Dallas Sidekicks on November 22, 2014.

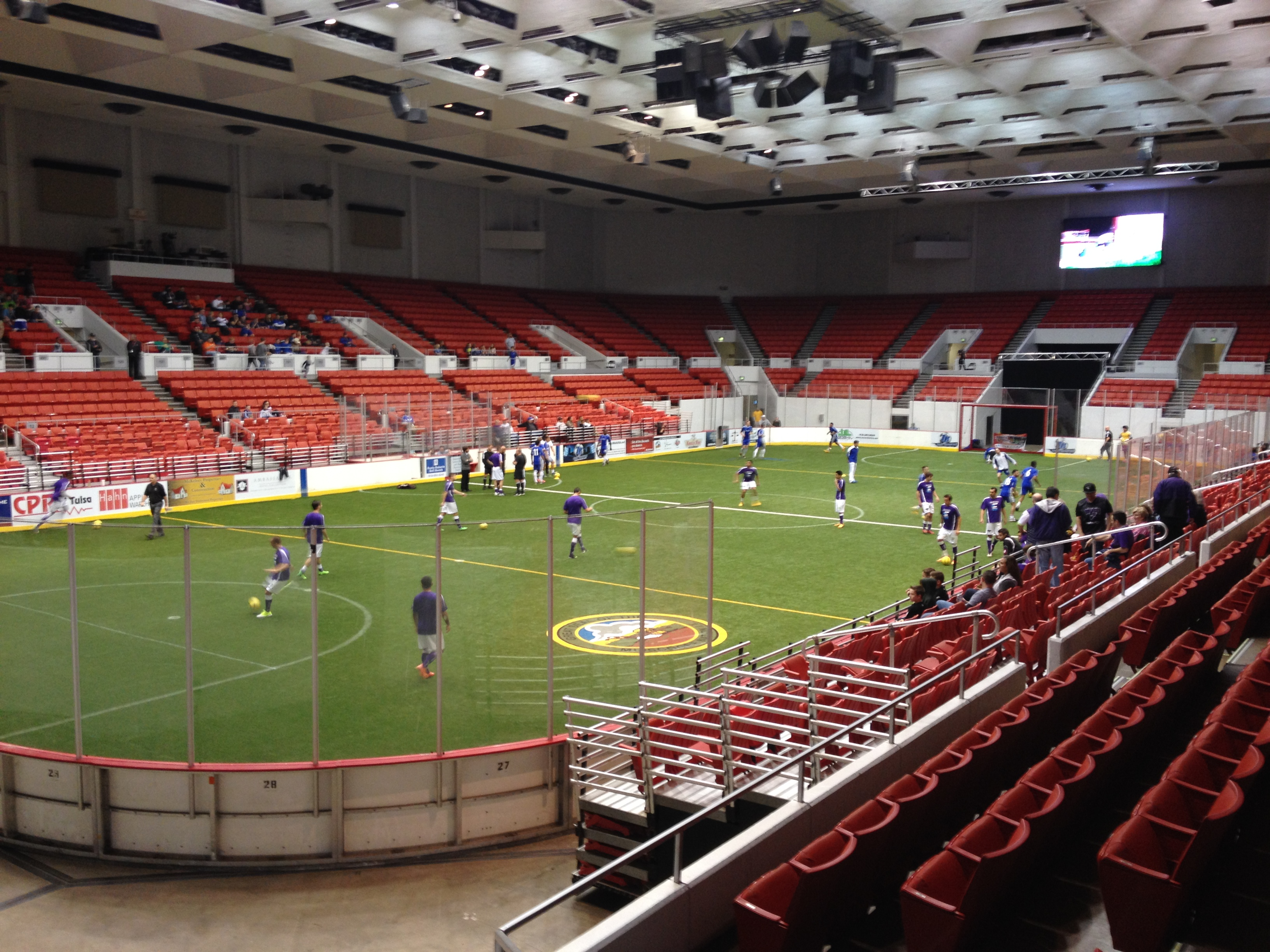
Tulsa warmups at Cox Business Center on November 22, 2014.

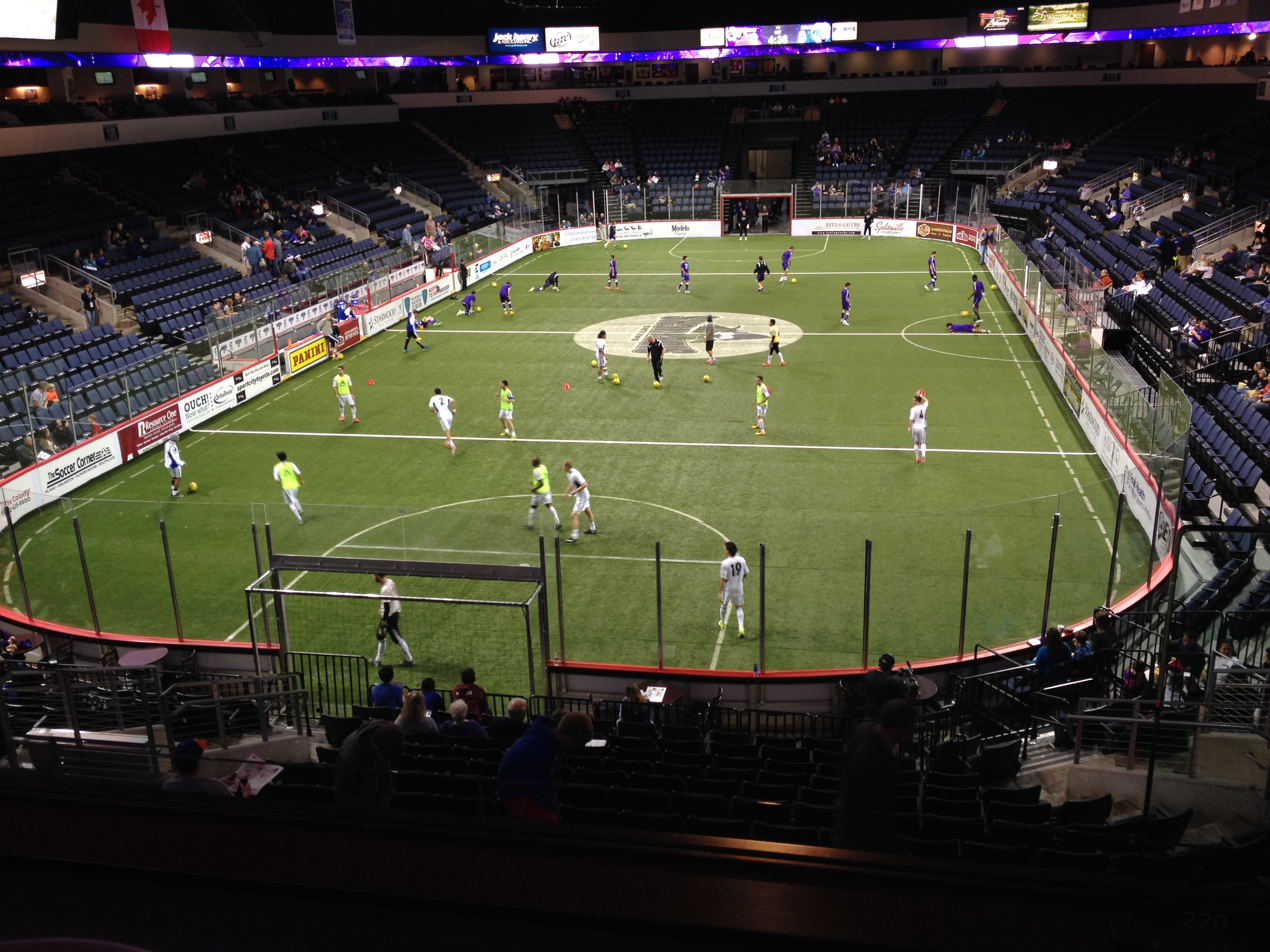
Revolution on the road at Dallas on December 14, 2014.

An earlier iteration of the Tulsa Revolution, also owned by Adam Mellor, played for a portion of the 2007-08 season in the American Indoor Soccer League (AISL). That team struggled on the field but was planning for a full season in 2008–09 when the AISL folded.

The Tulsa Revolution name lay dormant until July 10, 2012, when Adam Mellor and Shannon Clark were awarded a franchise as owners of an expansion team in the Professional Arena Soccer League for the 2013–14 season. Tulsa struggled in their first PASL season and ultimately finished the season with a 2–14 record. The Revolution also participated in the 2013–14 United States Open Cup for Arena Soccer, beating the independent Tulsa Tea Men in the Round of 32 but falling to the PASL's Wichita B-52s in the Round of 16 game.

== Off-field moves ==
In May 2014, the Professional Arena Soccer League added six refugee teams from the failed third incarnation of the Major Indoor Soccer League and reorganized as the Major Arena Soccer League. The 2014–15 MASL season will be 20 games long, 4 more than the 16 regular season games of recent PASL seasons.

With the league expansion and reorganization, the Revolution welcomed a new slate of teams to the MASL's Central division. The other Central teams for 2014–15 are the Chicago Mustangs, Milwaukee Wave, St. Louis Ambush, Wichita B-52s, and Kansas City-based Missouri Comets.

Tulsa updated their jerseys for 2014–15 with the logo of River Spirit Casino, one of the team's major sponsors, on the jersey fronts. In-arena promotions for 2014 included a "Trunk or Treat Night" on October 25 in anticipation of Halloween, River Spirit Casino Night on November 14, a parade of teams on November 22, youth club night on November 29, plus Faith and Fellowship Night on December 6. Scheduled promotions for 2015 include Turn Tulsa Pink Night on January 24, Corporate Night on January 30, and Thank You Tulsa Night on February 20.

In August 2014, the team announced that former Tulsa Roughnecks player David Yates would be their new head coach. Yates is a native of Manchester, England, and has lived and worked in Tulsa for more than a decade. He replaced Michael Nsien who led the Revolution to a 2–14 record the previous season. Yates was fired in mid-January 2015 after leading the Revolution to a 1–9 record. On January 20, assistant coach Alex Miranda was formally promoted in interim head coach for the remainder of the season.

== Schedule ==
Win Tie Loss Cancelled

=== Pre-season ===
Game	Day	Date	Kickoff	Opponent	Results		Location	Attendance
Game	Day	Date	Kickoff	Opponent	Score	Record	Location	Attendance
1	Friday	October 10	2:00pm	Dallas Sidekicks	Tie 3–3	0–0-1	Soccer City Tulsa	
2	Friday	October 17	2:00pm	at Dallas Sidekicks	L 14–6	0–1-1	Soccer Spectrum (Richardson)	
3	Saturday	October 25	7:05pm	Mexico National Indoor Team	L 3–11	0–2–1	Cox Business Center	

=== Regular season ===
Game	Day	Date	Kickoff	Opponent	Results		Location	Attendance
Game	Day	Date	Kickoff	Opponent	Score	Record	Location	Attendance
1	Saturday	November 8	7:05pm	at Wichita B-52s	L 6–12	0–1	Hartman Arena	1,510
2	Friday	November 14	7:05pm	Oxford City FC of Texas	W 8–5	1–1	Cox Business Center	562
3	Saturday	November 22	7:05pm	Dallas Sidekicks	L 5–14	1–2	Cox Business Center	526
4	Saturday	November 29	7:05pm	Wichita B-52s	L 4–8	1–3	Cox Business Center	461
5	Saturday	December 6	7:05pm	Missouri Comets	L 5–15	1–4	Cox Business Center	506
6	Saturday	December 13	7:05pm	at Oxford City FC of Texas	L 4–17	1–5	Ford Arena	1,078
7	Sunday	December 14	3:00pm	at Dallas Sidekicks	L 4–12	1–6	Allen Event Center	3,209
8	Saturday	December 20	1:05pm	at Milwaukee Wave	L 3–9	1–7	UW–Milwaukee Panther Arena	1,888
9	Saturday	January 3	7:05pm	at Chicago Mustangs	L 2–16	1–8	Sears Centre	1,244
10	Saturday	January 10	7:05pm	at Missouri Comets	L 2–18	1–9	Independence Events Center	4,476
11	Sunday	January 18	3:05pm	at Chicago Mustangs	L 1–9	1–10	Sears Centre	1,007
12	Friday	January 23	7:35pm	at St. Louis Ambush	L 5–11	1–11	Family Arena	5,009
13	Saturday	January 24	7:05pm	Chicago Mustangs^{2}	L 0–3	1–12	Expo Square Pavilion	Forfeit
14	Friday	January 30	7:05pm	Saltillo Rancho Seco	W 9–8	2–12	Expo Square Pavilion	?
15	Friday	February 6	7:05pm	Milwaukee Wave	L 13–3	2–13	Expo Square Pavilion	433
16	Saturday	February 7	7:05pm	St. Louis Ambush	L 7–3	2–14	Expo Square Pavilion	372
17	Saturday	February 14	7:05pm	at Missouri Comets	L 4–21	2–15	Independence Events Center	4,414
18	Friday	February 20	7:05pm	St. Louis Ambush	L 9–14	2–16	Expo Square Pavilion	197
19	Saturday	February 21	7:05pm	at Wichita B-52s	L 6–12	2–17	Hartman Arena	2,458
20	Sunday	February 22^{1}	3:05pm	Wichita B-52s	L 4–22	2–18	Expo Square Pavilion	208

^{1} Game rescheduled from December 27 due to a change in home venues.
^{2} Game cancelled due to "complications moving the turf"; Tulsa forfeits.

== Awards and honors ==
Tulsa's Lucas Almeida earned honorable mention for the league's all-rookie team for 2014-15.
