= 2012–13 Rio Grande Valley Flash season =

Rio Grande Valley Flash
2012–13 PASL season
- Owner: Gerardo Guerra Lozano
- Head Coach: Mariano Bollella
- Arena: State Farm Arena; Hidalgo, Texas
- PASL: 2nd, Central
- Ron Newman Cup: Lost in semi-final
- US Open Cup: DNP
- Highest home attendance: 2,035 (December 7, 2012) vs Arizona Storm
- Lowest home attendance: 966 (November 25, 2012) vs Dallas Sidekicks
- Average home league attendance: 1,549 (over 8 home games)

The 2012–13 Rio Grande Valley Flash season was the first season of the Rio Grande Valley Flash indoor soccer club. The Flash, a Central Division team in the Professional Arena Soccer League, played their home games in the State Farm Arena in Hidalgo, Texas. The team was led by owner Gerardo Guerra Lozano and head coach Mariano Bollella.

== Season summary ==
The Flash were successful in the regular season, compiling a 12–4 record and placing second in the competitive Central Division. The team split the first half of the season with four wins and four losses before winning the final regular season matches. The team also fared well at the box office, drawing the fourth-highest average attendance for home games this season. The Flash qualified for the postseason and earned the right to play for the Ron Newman Cup in the PASL National Championship. They defeated Central Division regular season champion Dallas Sidekicks in consecutive games and advanced to the PASL Semi-finals in San Diego where they fell to the Detroit Waza in overtime.

The Flash did not participate in the 2012–13 United States Open Cup for Arena Soccer.

== Off-field moves ==
The original logo, echoing the Monterrey Flash logo, used until January 9, 2013

The team was originally organized in 2011 as the Monterrey Flash in the Liga Mexicana de Futbol Rápido Profesional (LMFR). Although successful (they won the league championship and finished second in the 2012 FIFRA Club Championship) owner Gerardo Guerra Lozano moved the team across the border to Texas and joined the PASL in September 2012. In mid-October 2012, the Flash announced that they had rejoined the LMFR and would participate in both leagues.

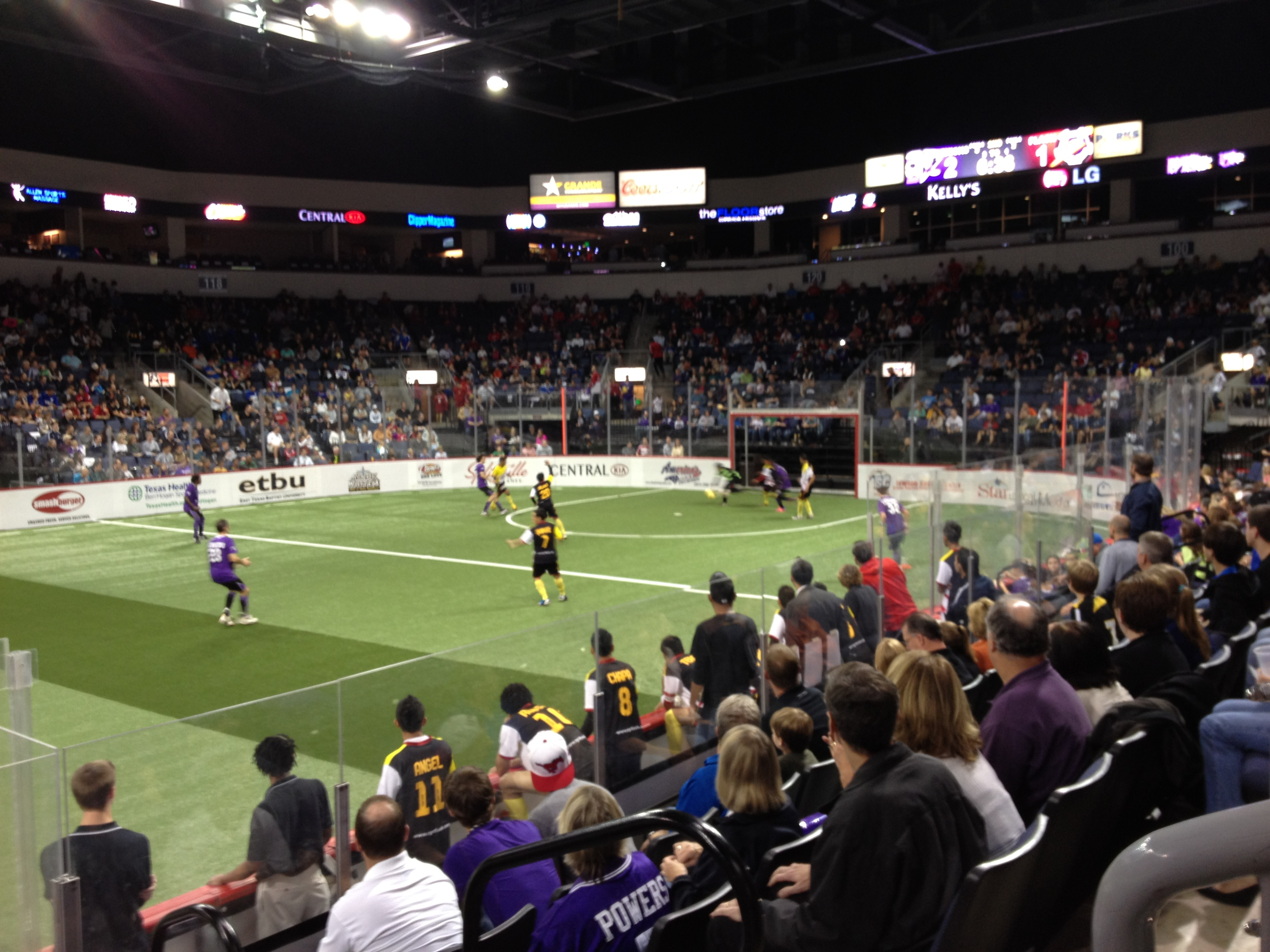
The Flash at the Dallas Sidekicks, November 30, 2012.

The team's initial logo matched the one used in Monterrey, with only the location named updated. On January 9, 2013, the Flash unveiled a new, sleeker logo during a press conference at Ford Arena.

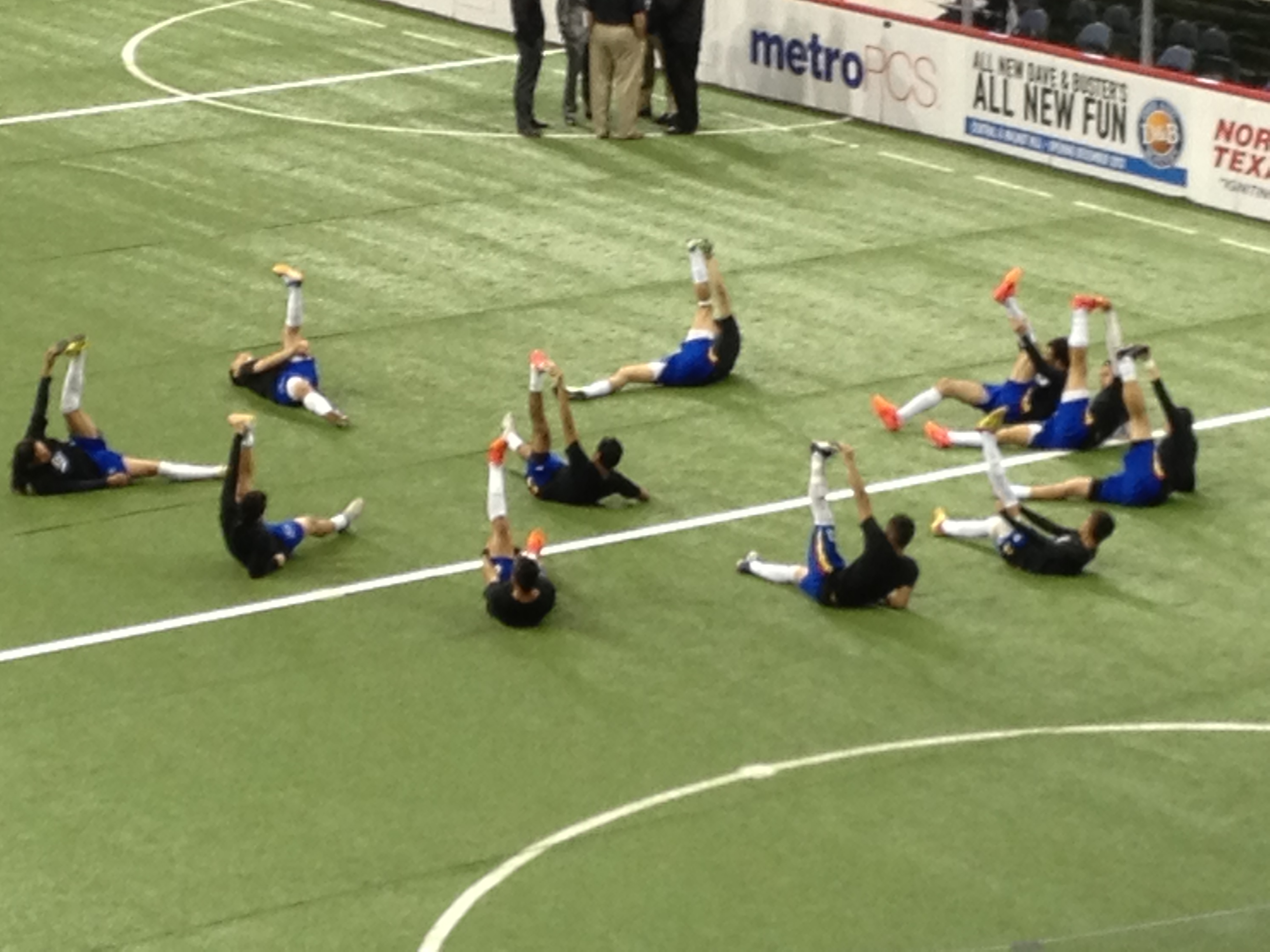
The Flash warming up before a February 28, 2013, match against the Dallas Sidekicks in Allen, Texas.

The Flash held several pre-season promotion events including a friendly match against local media on November 14 and a "Student's Day" for local area schools during their November 15 match against the Texas South Devils of the National Premier Soccer League.

== Roster moves ==
On January 9, 2013, the team announced that it had signed a number of "soccer stars from Mexico" to play for the Flash during home games. The first such announced signing was Claudio "Diablo" Nuñez, formerly of the Tigres UANL. At the same press conference, the Flash announced the signing of goalkeeper Juan Gamboa, a Brownsville, Texas, native who played for The University of Texas at Brownsville.

On January 31, 2013, the team announced the signing of Hector Nicanor. The veteran defender played for C.F. Monterrey and Monarcas Morelia in the Mexican Primera División of Liga MX in the mid-1990s.

== Awards and honors ==
In postseason honors, defender Damian Garcia was named to the 2012-13 PASL All-League Second Team.

== Schedule ==
Win Tie Loss

=== Pre-season ===
Game	Day	Date	Kickoff	Opponent	Results		Location	Attendance
Game	Day	Date	Kickoff	Opponent	Final Score	Team Record	Location	Attendance
1	Thursday	November 15	10:00am	Texas South Devils (NPSL)	W 6–5	1–0	State Farm Arena	

=== Regular season ===
Game	Day	Date	Kickoff	Opponent	Results		Location	Attendance
Game	Day	Date	Kickoff	Opponent	Final Score	Record	Location	Attendance
1	Saturday	November 17	7:30pm	Texas Strikers	W 13–1	1–0	State Farm Arena	1,758
2	Sunday	November 25	5:00pm	Dallas Sidekicks	L 3–7	1–1	State Farm Arena	966
3	Friday	November 30	7:30pm	at Dallas Sidekicks	L 3–7	1–2	Allen Event Center	5,606
4	Friday	December 7	7:30pm	Arizona Storm	W 16–2	2–2	State Farm Arena	2,035
5	Sunday	December 16	6:00pm	Rockford Rampage	W 7–1	3–2	State Farm Arena	1,357
6	Friday	December 28	8:00pm	at Chicago Mustangs	L 9–10	3–3	Grand Sports Arena	299
7	Saturday	December 29	7:05pm	at Rockford Rampage	W 3–2	4–3	Victory Sports Complex	322
8	Thursday	January 3	7:30pm	at Dallas Sidekicks	L 2–5	4–4	Allen Event Center	4,978
9	Friday	January 4	7:05pm	at Texas Strikers	W 10–1	5–4	Ford Arena	496
10	Sunday	January 20	5:00pm	Dallas Sidekicks	W 8–6	6–4	State Farm Arena	1,463
11	Sunday	January 27	5:00pm	Texas Strikers	W 12–3	7–4	State Farm Arena	1,549
12	Friday	February 1	7:30pm	Real Phoenix ♥	W 21–3	8–4	State Farm Arena	1,521
13	Saturday	February 9	7:00pm (9:00pm Central)	at Anaheim Bolts	W 18–4	9–4	Anaheim Convention Center	689
14	Sunday	February 10	1:00pm (3:00pm Central)	at Toros Mexico	W 6–2	10–4	UniSantos Park	300
15	Friday	February 15	7:30pm	Chicago Mustangs	W 8–5	11–4	State Farm Arena	1,749
16	Saturday	February 16	7:05pm	at Texas Strikers	W 11–10 (OT)	12–4	Ford Arena	620

♥ Replacement squad after Phoenix franchise revoked by league.

=== Postseason ===
Round	Day	Date	Kickoff	Opponent	Results		Location	Attendance
Round	Day	Date	Kickoff	Opponent	Final Score	Record	Location	Attendance
Division Finals Game 1	Sunday	February 24	3:05pm	Dallas Sidekicks	W 5–4 (OT)	1–0	State Farm Arena	1,600
Division Finals Game 2	Thursday	February 28	7:30pm	at Dallas Sidekicks	W 8–5	2–0	Allen Event Center	3,274
Semi-Finals	Sunday	March 10	4:00pm (6:00pm Central)	Detroit Waza	L 5–6 (OT)	2–1	Valley View Casino Center	?
