= 2013–14 Hidalgo La Fiera season =

Hidalgo La Fiera
2013–14 PASL season
- President: Joaquín García Fernández
- Head Coach: Mariano Bollella
- Arena: State Farm Arena; Hidalgo, Texas
- Ron Newman Cup: 2nd place
- US Open Cup: 2nd place
- Highest home attendance: 2,568 (November 17 vs Saltillo Rancho Seco)
- Lowest home attendance: 135 (February 6 vs Texas Strikers)
- Average home league attendance: 1,036 (8 games)

The 2013–14 Hidalgo La Fiera season was the second season for the professional indoor soccer club but first under the Hidalgo La Fiera branding. (The team is also known as La Fiera FC.) The franchise was founded in 2012 as the Rio Grande Valley Flash. La Fiera, a Central Division team in the Professional Arena Soccer League, played their home games in the State Farm Arena in Hidalgo, Texas.

The team was led by president Joaquín García Fernández and head coach Mariano Bollella. La Fiera completed the regular season with a 14–2 record and the Central Division Championship. In the post-season, they won their way into the PASL Championship match but lost to the Chicago Mustangs 15–4.

== Season summary ==
The season started with an overtime loss on the road versus the expansion Monterrey Flash but La Fiera won their next nine games, including the third shootout in PASL history and two more overtime games. Another road loss (6–11) to Monterrey snapped that streak but a 7–1 win at home over the Flash the next week gave La Fiera a split in the season series and a one-goal lead head-to-head, a critical advantage in determining postseason seeding. The team finished January with two more wins and finished the regular season with a 14–2 record and the top spot in the Central Division.

In the post-season, Hidalgo defeated the Monterrey Flash 9–8 in the Central Division Final at the State Farm Arena. They advanced to the PASL Final Four at the Sears Centre in Chicago where they defeated the Las Vegas Legends 6–5 in the Semi-final match. They faced the Chicago Mustangs on March 16 in the Championship match but lost 15–4.

La Fiera also participated in the 2013–14 United States Open Cup for Arena Soccer, starting with a bye in the Round of 32. Hidalgo's December 29, 2013, regular season 12–9 win over the Dallas Sidekicks also counted as both teams' Round of 16 match, advancing La Fiera to a February 1 Quarter-finals match. Hidalgo defeated Austin FC of the Premier Arena Soccer League 13–2 to advance to the Semi-finals. They defeated Las Vegas Legends 6–5 in a game that doubled as the PASL Semi-final match. They faced the Chicago Mustangs on March 16 in an Open Cup Final that doubled as the PASL championship match and lost 15–4.

== History ==
The team was originally organized in 2011 as the "Monterrey Flash" in the Liga Mexicana de Futbol Rápido Profesional (LMFR). Although successful, the team moved across the border to Texas and joined the PASL as the "Rio Grande Valley Flash" in September 2012. In mid-October 2012, the Flash announced that they had rejoined the LMFR and would participate in both leagues. This move prove short-lived and the team fell into disarray after the 2012–13 PASL season. In July 2013, Victor Fernandez assumed ownership of the team and reorganized it as "La Fiera FC" with a new logo and colors. In late July, Joaquín García Fernández was announced as team president.

== Off-field moves ==
Legendary Mexican soccer player Cuauhtémoc Blanco was honored by the team on November 17, during the match against Saltillo Rancho Seco.

== Awards and honors ==
On February 26, 2014, the PASL announced its "All-League" honors. Goalkeeper Juan Gamboa was one of six players named to the All-League First Team.

== Schedule ==
Win Loss

=== Regular season ===
Game	Day	Date	Kickoff	Opponent	Results		Location	Attendance
Game	Day	Date	Kickoff	Opponent	Final Score	Record	Location	Attendance
1	Sunday	November 3	5:05 pm	at Monterrey Flash	L 5–6 (OT)	0–1	Arena Monterrey	9,627
2	Sunday	November 10	4:35 pm	Texas Strikers	W 13–1	1–1	State Farm Arena	1,025
3	Sunday	November 17	5:05 pm	Saltillo Rancho Seco	W 16–3	2–1	State Farm Arena	2,568
4	Friday	November 22	7:05 pm	at Tulsa Revolution	W 7–6 (OT)	3–1	Cox Business Center	898
5	Saturday	November 23	7:05 pm	at Wichita B-52s	W 6–5 (SO)	4–1	Hartman Arena	1,482
6	Saturday	December 7	7:05 pm	at Texas Strikers	W 14–3	5–1	Ford Arena	239
7	Sunday	December 15	7:05 pm	Monterrey Flash	W 5–4 (OT)	6–1	State Farm Arena	1,242
8	Sunday	December 29	5:05 pm	Dallas Sidekicks†	W 12–9	7–1	State Farm Arena	1,062
9	Saturday	January 4	7:05 pm	at Texas Strikers	W 15–4	8–1	Ford Arena	214
10	Saturday	January 11	7:05 pm	at Saltillo Rancho Seco	W 9–1	9–1	Deportivo Rancho-Seco Saltillo	316
11	Sunday	January 12	5:05 pm	at Monterrey Flash	L 6–11	9–2	Arena Monterrey	7,123
12	Saturday	January 18	7:35 pm	Monterrey Flash	W 7–1	10–2	State Farm Arena	1,264
13	Sunday	January 26	7:35 pm	Saltillo Rancho Seco	W 15–3	11–2	State Farm Arena	483
14	Thursday	February 6	11:05 am	Texas Strikers	W 26–3	12–2	State Farm Arena	135
15	Thursday	February 13	8:05 pm	at Saltillo Rancho Seco	W 6–3	13–2	Deportivo Rancho-Seco Saltillo	127
16	Sunday	February 16	5:05 pm	Tulsa Revolution	W 23–2	14–2	State Farm Arena	512

† Game also counts for US Open Cup, as listed in chart below.

=== Post-season ===
Round	Day	Date	Kickoff	Opponent	Results		Location	Attendance
Round	Day	Date	Kickoff	Opponent	Score	Record	Location	Attendance
Central Division Final	Saturday	March 1	7:05 pm	Monterrey Flash	W 9–8	1–0	State Farm Arena	1,322
PASL Semifinal	Saturday	March 15	5:00 pm	Las Vegas Legends†	W 5–4	2–0	Sears Centre	1,607
PASL Final	Sunday	March 16	4:30 pm	at Chicago Mustangs†	L 4–15	2–1	Sears Centre	3,969

† Game also counts for US Open Cup, as listed in chart below.

=== U.S. Open Cup for Arena Soccer ===
Round	Day	Date	Kickoff	Opponent	Results		Location	Attendance
Round	Day	Date	Kickoff	Opponent	Score	Record	Location	Attendance
Round of 32	BYE							
Round of 16	Sunday	December 29	5:05 pm	Dallas Sidekicks	W 12–9	1–0	State Farm Arena	1,062
Quarter-finals	Saturday	February 1	7:30 pm	Austin FC (PASL-Premier)	W 13–2	2–0	Golazo Soccer (Pharr, TX)	125
Semi-finals	Saturday	March 15	5:00 pm	Las Vegas Legends	W 5–4	3–0	Sears Centre	1,607
Finals	Sunday	March 16	4:30 pm	at Chicago Mustangs	L 4–15	3–1	Sears Centre	3,969
