= New York Empire =

New York Empire may refer to:

- New York Empire (AUDL), an ultimate team in the American Ultimate Disc League
- New York Empire (tennis), a team in World TeamTennis
- New York Hampton Surf, a team in the American Indoor Soccer League
