= Sonny Dalesandro =

American soccer player and businessman (born 1977)

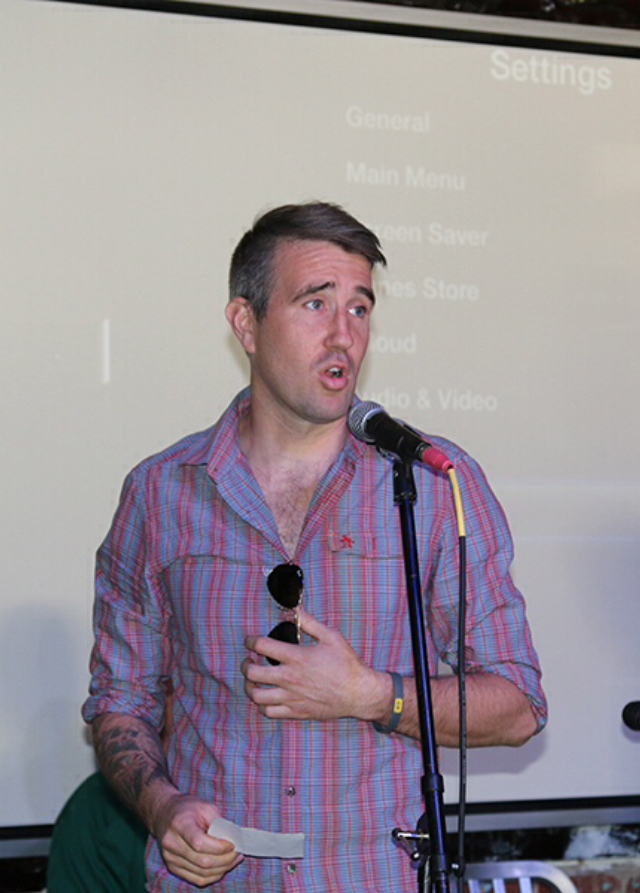

Personal information
- Full name: Vincent James Dalesandro IV
- Date of birth: October 24, 1977 (age 49)
- Place of birth: Hayward, Wisconsin, United States
- Height: 6 ft 0 in (1.83 m)
- Position: Goalkeeper

Senior career*
| Years | Team | Apps | (Gls) |
| 1995–1996 | Tulsa Roughnecks (indoor) | 17 | |
| 1996–1998 | Milwaukee Wave (indoor) | 3 | (0) |
| 1999 | Tulsa Roughnecks | 15 | (3) |
| 1999–2001 | Wichita Wings (indoor) | 24 | (0) |
| 2008 | Tulsa Revolution (indoor) | 3 | |
- * Club domestic league appearances and goals

Vincent "Sonny" Dalesandro (born October 24, 1977, in Hayward, Wisconsin) is a retired professional soccer player and current restaurateur. He resides in Tulsa, Oklahoma. He is co-owner of elite amateur soccer club Tulsa Athletic of the The League for Clubs.

== Professional career ==
Dalesandro dropped out of Cascia Hall Preparatory School following his junior year to pursue a career as a professional soccer player. He had been named to the All-Conference team in all three years at Cascia. At 17 he joined the USISL's Tulsa Roughnecks. He had an excellent debut season and was named 1995 USISL "Rookie of the Year".

In the fall of 1996, present day Tulsa Athletics coach Joey Ryan secured Dalesandro a tryout with the Milwaukee Wave. Sonny impressed enough to be taken on as the club's 3rd choice goalkeeper, later becoming the back-up to indoor soccer legend Victor Nogueira. He regards his tutelage under Nogueira as the most valuable instruction he received in his time as a professional. Dalesandro saw limited time in Milwaukee and was released during training camp the following season due to a broken thumb and the acquisition of former Canadian Olympic team goalkeeper Carmine Isacco.

Dalesandro returned to Tulsa and to playing for the Roughnecks in 1999. During the '99 season he was asked to play forward on 5 occasions where the team traveled a light roster. Scoring on three separate occasions against the Houston Hurricanes has earned him the peculiar title of top scoring American on the list of goalscoring goalkeepers.

Following the 1999 Outdoor season, friend and former coach Victor Moreland sent Dalesandro to his former club the Wichita Wings for a trial. Dalesandro impressed during the preseason tournament in Cleveland and was subsequently signed to a two-year contract. He was victorious and named "man of the match" in his first NPSL start against the Kansas City Attack at Kemper Arena October 23, 1999. A respectable 8–8 record subsequently placed Dalesandro 11th in the NPSL "Rookie of the year" voting. The following season Dalesandro was one of 6 players the Wings protected in the expansion draft. However, when the Edmonton Drillers folded in the beginning of the 2000–2001 season, the acquisition of 3-time All-Star goalkeeper Jim Larkin in the dispersal draft ultimately led to Dalesandro's release. During his time in Wichita, Dalesandro became an ordained minister through Universal Life Church (though he is an atheist) and would bless players shoes with water in the shape of a plus sign said to represent "positive energy".

In 2008 the Tulsa Revolution coaxed Dalesandro out of retirement to captain the upstart AISL franchise. Three games into the season, Dalesandro suffered a broken foot which required surgery. It was quickly revealed that the insurance that was in the players contracts was in fact, non-existent. Dalesandro took the ownership to court and upon their failure to appear, was awarded a default judgment. The ownership filed bankruptcy before any compensation was paid.

Dalesandro still plays Sunday league for Boston Avenue Athletic Club. A club he co-founded in 2005.

== Restaurant ==
Sonny's father Vincent "Buzz" Dalesandro III founded the family's award-winning restaurant "Dalesandro's" in 1990, where it stayed until 2002 when Bank of America bought the property, tore it down, and built a parking lot. In 2004 the pair re-opened the business at its current 18th & Boston, Tulsa location. Sonny bought out his father's interest in January 2010. The restaurant has won "Best Italian" in Oklahoma Magazine, Tulsa People Magazine, and Urban Tulsa multiple times. The restaurant has also been featured in Southern Living magazine.

== Tulsa Athletics ==
In August 2012, Dalesandro and longtime friend Dr. Tommy Kern purchased the rights to an NPSL club. On April 4, 2013, the Tulsa Athletics were unveiled to the public. The Athletics popularity was instant and after the first year were the 28th best attended soccer franchise in the United States. They were again in the top 35 for attendance in 2014. The team has experienced great on-field success as well, winning their division three times in the five years of their existence and thrice qualifying for the Lamar Hunt U.S. Open Cup. Dalesandro lightheartedly claims the role of club chairman, though he takes on any tasks necessary and can religiously be found mowing the game field in the early hours before every home game with a push mower. The team had regular talks with the NASL about moving to the now defunct US second division league. In 2017 the club changed their name to "Tulsa Athletic" following a petulant objection filed by the Oakland Athletics. The case is ongoing, but in February 2017 Dalesandro penned a humorous yet scathing article in The Tulsa Voice highlighting the ridiculousness of the claim.

== Charity work ==
Dalesandro works with countless charities through both Dalesandro's restaurant and the Tulsa Athletics. Some of these include breast cancer charities Oklahoma Project Woman and BCAP, HOPE (AIDS testing clinic) and Oklahomans for Equality (LGBT equal rights) to name a few.

== Jiu Jitsu ==
In December 2015 and 2017, Dalesandro competed in American Grappling Federation's Nationals, both times winning gold in the no gi competition in his respective divisions. As a student under Todd Ryan of Brazilian Jiu Jitsu, he presently holds a brown belt.

== Personal life ==
He can oftentimes be found roaming around Tulsa on his fixed gear bicycle or with his rescue chihuahua "Queenie". He is generally a fan of anything counter culture. Dalesandro was married to English model/actress/dancer Stephanie Hepkin [née] Harrow. The two were married in 2003 and divorced in October 2006. He is also a member of the debauched sextet TEA.

== Awards ==
- USISL Rookie of the year – 1995
- NPSL South-Central Conference Champion – 2013, 2014, 2016
- NPSL South Region Runner-up – 2014
- NPSL South Region Champions – 2021, 2022
- NPSL Midwest Region Champions – 2023
- NPSL National Runner-up – 2021
- NPSL National Champions – 2023
- Oklahoma Magazine "Best Italian" – 2008, 2009, 2010, 2013, 2014, 2015, 2016, 2017, 2018, 2019, 2020, 2021, 2022, 2023, 2024
- Tulsa People Magazine "Best Italian" – 2009, 2013, 2014, 2015, 2016, 2017, 2018, 2019, 2020, 2021, 2022, 2023, 2024
- Urban Tulsa Magazine "Best Italian" – 2009, 2011, 2012, 2013, 2014
- Tulsa Voice Magazine "Best Italian" – 2015
- AGF Nationals Gold medalist – 2015, 2017
