= 2007–08 American Indoor Soccer League season =

American Indoor Soccer League season

The 2007–2008 American Indoor Soccer League season was the fifth and final season of the American Indoor Soccer League. The season kicked off on November 3, 2007, with the Rockford Rampage traveling to taking on the Cincinnati Excite, and the Massachusetts Twisters traveling to Waukegan, Illinois, to face the expansion Northern Illinois Rebels. The league ended on March 15, 2008, with the Rockford Rampage winning the AISL Championship.

All teams played fourteen games (with two separate weeks off. This is excluding the Tulsa Revolution who only played four home and four away games (which kept them out of eligibility for the AISL playoffs).

The league folded after this season.

== Standings ==
2007–08 regular season

Place	Team	Record	Points
1	Rockford Rampage	12-1	17
2	Massachusetts Twisters	7-7	22
3	Cincinnati Excite	6-7	19
4	Northern Illinois Rebels	3-10	9
5	Tulsa Revolution	2-5	6

== Final statistics ==
Stat	Single Player
Most Points	Novi Marojevic (42)
Most Goals	Matt Brienes (30)
Most Wins	Dimitri Meletis (12)
