= 2014–15 Hidalgo La Fiera season =

Hidalgo La Fiera
2014–15 MASL season
- President: Joaquín García Fernández
- Head Coach: Mariano Bollella (games 1–2); Angel Hernandez (games 3–4); Julio Garcia (games 5–8)
- Arena: State Farm Arena; 2600 North SH 336; Hidalgo, Texas 78557
- Major Arena Soccer League: Withdrew on December 23, 2014
- Top goalscorer: Edgar Flores (7 goals, 3 assists)
- Highest home attendance: 1,468 (November 23 vs. Monterrey Flash)
- Lowest home attendance: 225 (December 21 vs. Dallas Sidekicks)
- Average home league attendance: 707 (3 games)

The 2014–15 Hidalgo La Fiera season was the third season for the professional indoor soccer club and second under the Hidalgo La Fiera branding. (The team was also known as La Fiera FC.) The franchise was founded in 2012 as the Rio Grande Valley Flash. La Fiera, a Southern Division team in the Major Arena Soccer League, played most of their home games in the State Farm Arena in Hidalgo, Texas.

The team was led by president Joaquín García Fernández and head coach Julio Garcia. The team suffered financial difficulties and resigned its MASL franchise effective December 23, 2014.

== Season summary ==
La Fiera began the season with a win then alternated losses and wins for the 7 official games played by the team this season, amassing a 4–3 record. After playing their first three games on the road, the team announced the departure of head coach Mariano Bollella and that the home opener on November 23 would be free admission. Suffering from changes in the ownership group and a lack of revenue, the team began shedding players and attempted to reorganize.

A last-ditch money-saving effort involved rescheduling 3 late-December home games for the team's practice facility, Golazo Soccer in Pharr, Texas. Before the first such game, the visiting Dallas Sidekicks filed a protest with the league about the inadequate playing facilities, including too-small goals. The league vacated the apparent 4–3 La Fiera win on December 23. In a separate decision, they also accepted the team's resignation from the league, ending both La Fiera's season and MASL franchise.

== History ==
The team was originally organized in 2011 as the "Monterrey Flash" in the Liga Mexicana de Futbol Rápido Profesional (LMFR). Although successful, the team moved across the border to Texas and joined the PASL as the "Rio Grande Valley Flash" in September 2012. In mid-October 2012, the Flash announced that they had rejoined the LMFR and would participate in both leagues. This move prove short-lived and the team fell into disarray after the 2012–13 PASL season. In July 2013, Victor Fernandez assumed ownership of the team and reorganized it as "La Fiera FC" with a new logo and colors. In late July, Joaquín García Fernández was announced as team president. La Fiera completed the 2013-14 regular season with a 14–2 record and the Central Division Championship. In the post-season, they won their way into a dual Arena Open Cup and PASL Championship match but lost to the Chicago Mustangs 15–4.

== Off-field moves ==
In May 2014, the Professional Arena Soccer League added six refugee teams from the failed third incarnation of the Major Indoor Soccer League and reorganized as the Major Arena Soccer League. The 2014–15 MASL season will be 20 games long, 4 more than the 16 regular season games of recent PASL seasons.

With the league expansion and reorganization, Hidlago moved from the Central division to the new Southern division. The other Southern teams for 2014–15 are the Brownsville Barracudas, Dallas Sidekicks, Monterrey Flash, Saltillo Rancho Seco, and Beaumont-based Oxford City FC of Texas.

== Roster moves ==
On November 19, XHRIO-TV serving Harlingen, Texas, reported that the team "has let go of" Mariano Bollella and named defender Angel Hernandez as interim head coach with defender Joel Perez as his assistant coach. On November 20, the team informed the league that head coach Mariano Bollella and assistant coach Juan Vela had been released from the team. The team announced that admission to the Sunday, November 23, home game would be free and that a "special announcement" would be made during the game.

On November 28, Angel Hernandez and Joel Perez left the team and Julio Garcia was announced as the team's new head coach. On December 5, nine more players were released after seven of the nine had been placed on the 14-day injured reserve list on November 22.

== Schedule ==
Win Loss Vacated Cancelled

=== Regular season ===
Game	Day	Date	Kickoff	Opponent	Results		Location	Attendance
Game	Day	Date	Kickoff	Opponent	Score	Record	Location	Attendance
1	Saturday	November 8	7:05pm	at Oxford City FC of Texas	W 13–7	1–0	Ford Arena	1,388
2	Wednesday	November 12	8:35pm	at Monterrey Flash	L 4–7	1–1	Arena Monterrey	3,740
3	Saturday	November 22	6:00pm	at Brownsville Barracudas	W 6–3	2–1	Barracudas Sports Complex	715
4	Sunday	November 23	3:05pm	Monterrey Flash	L 2–11	2–2	State Farm Arena	1,468
5	Sunday	November 30	3:00pm	Oxford City FC of Texas	W 9–7	3–2	State Farm Arena	426
6	Saturday	December 6	7:00pm	at Dallas Sidekicks	L 3–7	3–3	Allen Event Center	3,907
7	Friday	December 12	7:35pm	at Saltillo Rancho Seco	W 11–10	4–3	Deportivo Rancho-Seco Saltillo	200
8	Sunday	December 14	3:05pm	Oxford City FC of Texas^{1}			State Farm Arena	
9	Sunday	December 21	3:05pm	Dallas Sidekicks^{2}	4–3		Golazo Soccer (Pharr)	228
10	Friday	December 26	7:05pm	Saltillo Rancho Seco			Golazo Soccer (Pharr)	
11	Saturday	December 27	7:05pm	Monterrey Flash			Golazo Soccer (Pharr)	
12	Saturday	January 3	7:00pm	at Dallas Sidekicks			Allen Event Center	
13	Saturday	January 10	7:05pm	at Oxford City FC of Texas			Ford Arena	
14	Sunday	January 11	3:05pm	Brownsville Barracudas			State Farm Arena	
15	Sunday	January 18	5:05pm	at Monterrey Flash			Arena Monterrey	
16	Monday	January 19	7:35pm	Brownsville Barracudas			State Farm Arena	
17	Sunday	January 25	3:05pm	Dallas Sidekicks			State Farm Arena	
18	Saturday	January 31	6:00pm	at Brownsville Barracudas			Barracudas Sports Complex	
19	Sunday	February 15	3:05pm	Saltillo Rancho Seco			State Farm Arena	
20	Friday	February 20	7:35pm	at Saltillo Rancho Seco			Deportivo Rancho-Seco Saltillo	

^{1} Game originally postponed; later cancelled after Hidalgo folded mid-season.
^{2} League vacated results on December 23 after upholding Dallas' protest of playing conditions.
