= Oscar Albuquerque =

Canadian former soccer player

Personal information
- Date of birth: September 4, 1954 (age 72)
- Place of birth: Lima, Peru
- Height: 5 ft 8 in (1.73 m)
- Position: Midfielder

College career
Years	Team	Apps	(Gls)
1976–1980	Laurentian Voyageurs		

Senior career*
Years	Team	Apps	(Gls)
1980	Buffalo Blazers		
1980–1982	Denver Avalanche (indoor)	80	(30)
1982–1983	Phoenix Inferno (indoor)	48	(33)
1983–1984	Phoenix Pride (indoor)	47	(21)
1983	Hamilton Steelers		
1984–1985	Las Vegas Americans (indoor)	39	(8)
1986	Los Angeles Lazers (indoor)	17	(4)
1986–1987	New York Express (indoor)	13	(2)
1986–1987	Memphis Storm (indoor)	24	(35)
1987	North York Rockets	14	(0)
1987	Hamilton Steelers	4	(0)
1987–1988	Chicago Sting (indoor)	53	(22)
1988–1990	Chicago Power (indoor)	58	(21)
1990–1992	Illinois Thunder (indoor)	49	(41)

International career
1979	Canada Olympic (amateur)	4	(0)

Managerial career
- 1990–1992: Illinois Thunder (assistant)
- 2004–2006: Chicago Storm (assistant)
- * Club domestic league appearances and goals

Oscar Albuquerque (born September 4, 1954) is a former soccer player who played as a midfielder. He spent most of his professional career playing indoor soccer with U.S. teams. He is currently the president of Pro Soccer International, an ownership group which holds the rights to American Indoor Soccer League teams in Chicago and Rockford, Illinois. Born in Peru, he represented Canada at international level.

== Youth and college ==
Albuquerque was born in Lima, Peru. He moved from his native Peru to Toronto, Ontario, Canada with his family when he was fifteen. At the time, his older brother, Hugo Albuquerque, was playing semi-professionally in Canada. After graduating from high school, Albuquerque attended Laurentian University where he was a member of the men's soccer team from 1976 to 1979. He was All Canadian in 1977, 1978 and 1979. He is a member of the Laurentian University Athletic Hall of Fame.

== Professional ==
Following graduation from college in 1980, Albuquerque signed with the Denver Avalanche of Major Indoor Soccer League (MISL). In the summer of 1980 he played in the National Soccer League with the Buffalo Blazers. He spent two seasons with the Avalanche, before the team folded in 1982. He then moved to the Phoenix Inferno for the 1982–83 season. In 1983, the team was renamed the Phoenix Pride. Albuquerque spent one more season in Phoenix with the Pride before moving to the Las Vegas Americans for the 1984–85 season. The league expelled the Americans in July 1985. In the summer of 1983 he played in the Canadian Professional Soccer League with Hamilton Steelers. In February 1986, the Los Angeles Lazers were hit with numerous injuries. The team signed Albuquerque to a ten-day contract. On February 23d, they signed him for the remainder of the season. That summer, he signed with the expansion New York Express, a team stocked with players from the New York Arrows and New York Cosmos. The Express was unable to match the success of those two teams and folded twenty-six games into the 1986–87 season. Albuquerque moved to the Memphis Storm of the American Indoor Soccer Association for the remainder of the 1986–87 season. In 1987 he played with North York Rockets and Hamilton Steelers of the Canadian Soccer League. He was back in MISL the next season with the Chicago Sting. However, the Sting folded at the end of the season and Albuquerque moved to the Chicago Power of the AISA for the next two seasons, 1988–1990. In 1990, the AISA has renamed the National Professional Soccer League (NPSL). Albuquerque finished his career with the Illinois Thunder of the NPSL with whom he played two seasons, 1990–1992.

== National team ==
In 1979, Albuquerque was called into the Canadian Olympic soccer team at it entered qualification for the 1980 Summer Olympics. Canada did not qualify for the tournament.

== Coaching ==
In his two seasons playing with the Illinois Thunder, Albuquerque also served as an assistant coach. On July 4, 2004, Albuquerque became an assistant coach with the expansion Chicago Storm of the Major Indoor Soccer League under head coach Frank Klopas.

== Team management ==
In 2006, Albuquerque became the president of the expansion Rockford Rampage which competes in the Professional Arena Soccer League.
