= BMO Center =

Arena in Illinois, United States

- "The Big Orange Box"
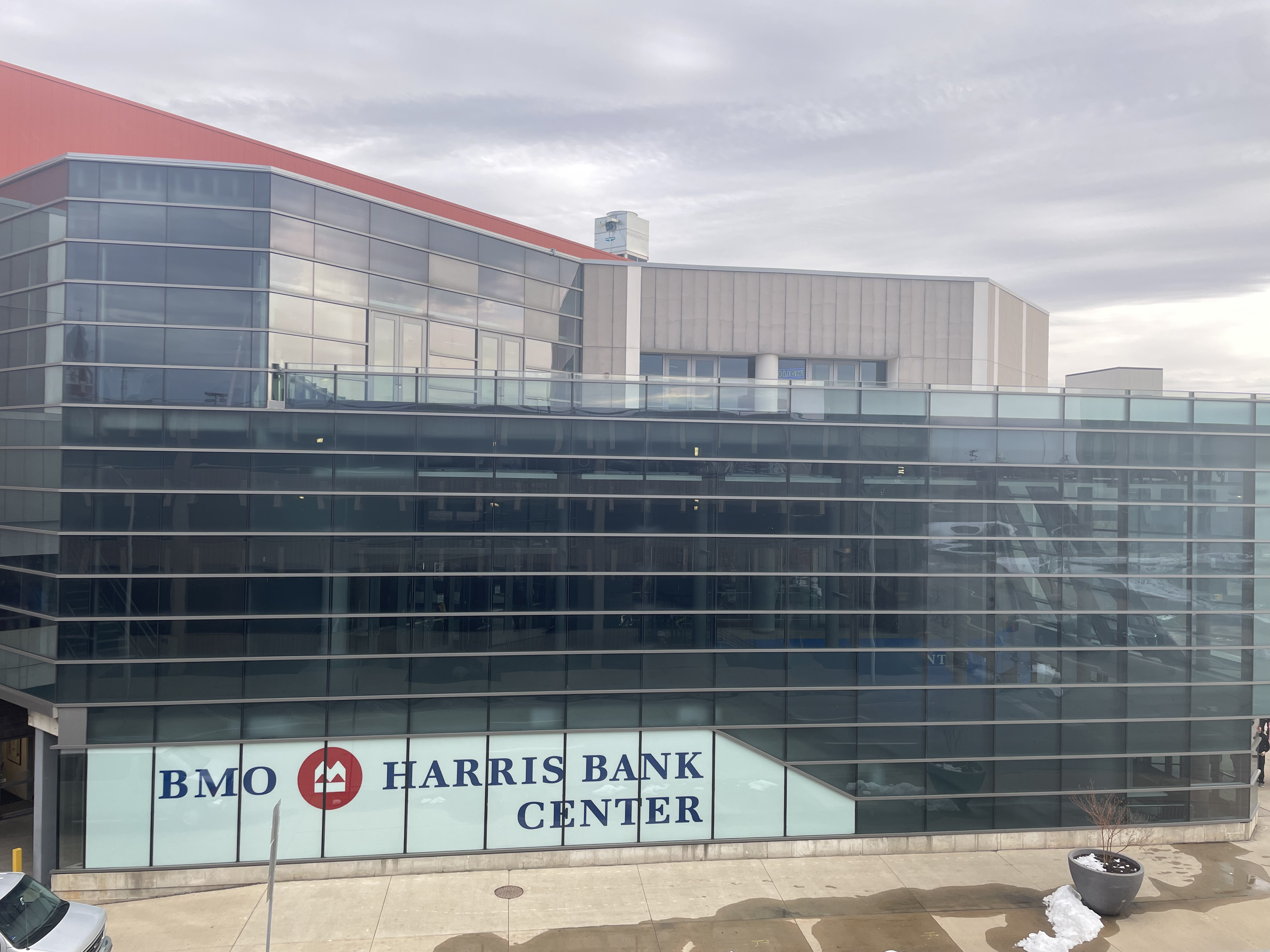
- BMO Center in March 2024

- Location within Illinois Location within the United States
- Former names: Rockford MetroCentre (1981–2011); BMO Harris Bank Center (2011–2022)
- Address: 300 Elm Street
- Location: Rockford, Illinois
- Coordinates: 42°16′12.95″N 89°5′45.9″W
- Owner: Rockford Area Venues & Entertainment Authority
- Operator: Legends Global
- Capacity: 5,895
- Public transit: RMTD

Construction
- Groundbreaking: February 7, 1979
- Opened: January 31, 1981
- Cost: $15.7 million (Note: Sources report differing construction-cost figures for the arena. A wire report at the February 1979 groundbreaking described a "$20 million project" scheduled to begin construction. The project architect, Larson & Darby Group, states the completed building cost $13 million.) ($69.6 million in 2025 dollars)
- Architects: Larson & Darby

Tenants
- Rockford Lightning (CBA) (1986–2006); Illinois Thunder (NPSL) (1990–1992); Rockford IceHogs (UHL) (1999–2007); Rockford Thunder/Rampage (AISL/MISL) (2005–2007, 2008–2010); Rock River Raptors (UIF/CIFL) (2006–2009); Chicago Rush (AFL) (2013); Rockford IceHogs (AHL) (2007–present); Chicago Blitz (X League) (2022–present)

The BMO Center (formerly known as BMO Harris Bank Center and Rockford MetroCentre) is a multi-purpose arena located in downtown Rockford, Illinois, United States. It is home to the AHL's Rockford IceHogs hockey team. The arena formerly served as the home of several defunct minor league sports teams, including the Rockford Lightning basketball team, the Rock River Raptors indoor football team, the Rockford Rampage indoor soccer team and the Chicago Rush arena football team.

Due to its outdoor appearance, it is often referred to as the "Big Orange Box".

Opened in 1981 as the Rockford MetroCentre, the arena is owned by the Rockford Area Venues & Entertainment Authority and managed by Legends Global. It has undergone several renovations, including a $23 million project that began in 2006, a 2013 seating upgrade, and a further seating and exterior renovation carried out between 2024 and 2026. In February 2026, the BMO Center hosted the AHL All-Star Classic for the first time.

== History ==
The opening night gala, on January 31, 1981, featured a concert by Dionne Warwick with the Rockford Symphony Orchestra before a crowd of 8,000. The Rolling Stones played the arena on October 1, 1981, on their 1981 North American Tour, after WZOK program director Dallas Cole organized a petition drive that gathered more than 35,000 signatures; the Stones accepted by telegram, writing "We are overwhelmed by your gracious invitation by petition. We accept. See you Oct. 1, 1981. Tattoo you." Organizers cut the enlarged petitions into strips and drew 4,300 names in a lottery, with each winner allowed to buy two $15 tickets. The show sold out at around 8,800 attendees.

The facility hosted Mid-American Conference men's basketball tournament games in 1984 and 1986, as well as Illinois High School Association boys basketball super-sectional games, including the Class AA super-sectional in the 1997–98 season. In addition to athletic events, it has hosted professional wrestling, monster truck rallies, rodeos, ice shows, circuses, craft shows, and beer festivals, and is a regular graduation venue for Rockford-area high schools.

The Rockford Lightning, a Continental Basketball Association team relocated from Baltimore, played at the arena from 1986 until it folded after the 2005–06 season; the club reached the CBA championship series four times without winning a title, and its roster included a young Bruce Bowen, later an NBA champion, in the mid-1990s. The Illinois Thunder, an expansion franchise in the National Professional Soccer League founded by Rockford real-estate executive Mike Kelegian, played two indoor soccer seasons at the arena beginning in 1990 before relocating to Colorado in 1992.

Starting on October 15, 1999, the Rockford IceHogs played their first game at the arena as members of the United Hockey League, defeating the Knoxville Speed 6–2; the team's name was chosen through a fan poll conducted with the Rockford Register Star after a 1998 ticket drive gauged local interest in professional hockey. The Rock River Raptors, an indoor American football team, played at the arena from 2006 to 2009. An indoor soccer club known as the Rockford Thunder, and later the Rockford Rampage, played Major Indoor Soccer League home games at the arena during the 2009–10 season under head coach Charlie Kraft, before folding in 2013 after stints in several other leagues.

The AHL's Rockford IceHogs, an affiliate of the Chicago Blackhawks, began play at the arena in the 2007–08 season after the league's board of governors approved relocating an inactive Cincinnati franchise to Rockford on March 19, 2007; under first head coach Mike Haviland, the team played its first AHL game on October 6, 2007. The Chicago Rush of the Arena Football League, whose regular home was Allstate Arena in Rosemont, Illinois, played two home games of its final (2013) season at the arena, defeating the Utah Blaze 67–43 on June 8; the same source notes that the venue, then known as the MetroCentre, had hosted the AFL's very first "test game" in 1986, between the Chicago Politicians and the Rockford Metros. The X League's Chicago Blitz, a women's tackle football team, debuted at the arena on August 6, 2022, in its lone regular-season home game that year.

== Renovations ==
In 2006, the city of Rockford, along with Winnebago County, announced plans to issue $23 million in bonds to fund a massive renovation of the Arena. Key to the plan was an agreement with the Chicago Blackhawks to put an American Hockey League (AHL) team in Rockford for the next 10 years. This team acts as the Blackhawks' farm team. The MetroCentre authority purchased an AHL franchise, and bought the rights to name it the "IceHogs".

During the summer of 2013, the seating structure in the building's lower level was replaced, making way for a new, updated seating system. New seats were added and the seating capacity for hockey increased to 5,895, up from 5,767. Along with new seats, the visitors' locker room was also expanded. New lights were added and the concourse was renovated. Before renovations in 2006, the arena's seating capacity was 8,700 for basketball.

In April of 2021, the IceHogs, Blackhawks, the City of Rockford, the Rockford Area Venues and Entertainment Authority (RAVE) and the Illinois Department of Commerce and Economic Opportunity (DCEO) announced a $23 million renovation of the BMO Center, which includes a reimagined Main Entryway and Box Office, remodeled Jack Daniels Bar, and new grab & go store.

== Arena information ==
The BMO Center hosts major concerts, sport events, and other large-scale events. The complex houses press boxes, a lounge, and suites to watch sport events in style, and a multi-purpose arena.

=== Naming rights ===
On August 11, 2011, it was announced that the Rockford IceHogs had reached a long term agreement with BMO Harris Bank for the venue's naming rights, effectively rebranding as the BMO Harris Bank Center. On October 20, 2022, the arena was again rebranded as the BMO Center.
