= Illinois Thunder =

- Founded: March 12, 1990
- Dissolved: September 1992
- Stadium: Rockford MetroCentre
- Capacity: 8,000
- Owner: Mike Kelegian
- League: National Professional Soccer League
- 1991–92: 3rd, National Division; lost in quarterfinals

The Illinois Thunder were an indoor soccer club based in Rockford, Illinois that competed in the National Professional Soccer League (NPSL) from 1990 to 1992. Owned by local real estate executive Mike Kelegian, the club played two seasons at the Rockford MetroCentre before relocating to Colorado as the Denver Thunder.

== History ==
The Thunder were founded on March 12, 1990, as an expansion franchise of the American Indoor Soccer Association, which was renamed the National Professional Soccer League before the team's inaugural season. They played their home games at the Rockford MetroCentre, an 8,000-seat arena that had opened in 1981, sharing the building during the winter with the Rockford Lightning of the Continental Basketball Association. The Thunder played their first game on November 2, 1990, a 14–5 loss to the Canton Invaders.

Heinz Wirtz, a former Chicago Sting player, was the Thunder's first head coach but was dismissed after three games; Paul Kitson, an English veteran of the indoor game, took over as player-coach for the rest of the franchise's time in Rockford. Forward Oscar Albuquerque led the team in scoring during its inaugural season with 40 goals and 45 assists. On March 21, 1991, the Thunder set an NPSL record for points scored in a game with a 34–4 win over the New York Kick at the MetroCentre; the league's goals could count for one, two, or three points depending on where they were scored from, so the total was not directly comparable to a standard soccer score. Elsewhere in the state, the Chicago Power were coached by another former Sting player, Karl-Heinz Granitza.

The Thunder played their final game in Rockford on April 4, 1992, losing to the Kansas City Attack in the playoff quarterfinals. In September 1992, Kelegian moved the franchise to Colorado, where it played as the Denver Thunder; the relocated club folded after a single season in 1993.

== Year-by-year ==
Year	Division	League	Reg. season	Playoffs	Avg. attendance
1990–91	2	NPSL	4th, National	Did not qualify	2,160
1991–92	2	NPSL	3rd, National	Quarterfinals	1,613
