= New York Hampton Surf =

New York/Hampton Surf
- Full name: New York/Hampton Surf
- Short name: Hampton Surf, The Surf
- Founded: 2006
- Dissolved: 2007
- Ground: Southampton Youth Sports Center
- Owner and President: Frank Cuzzi
- Head coach and Director of Operations: Fernando Gomes

The New York Hampton Surf soccer team played in the American Indoor Soccer League during the 2006/2007 season. It was formerly known as the New York Empire. Frank Cuzzi was the president and Corner Kick International, LLC was the parent company. The company provides soccer marketing and runs soccer camps in the New York area.

The Surf made its home on the East End of Long Island in the town of Town of Southampton, and played home games at Southampton Youth Sports Center in the 2006/2007 season.

The Surf made its home debut on December 9, 2006, in a 5–3 loss against the Massachusetts Twisters.

Two members of the Surf and former Hofstra players were selected in the 2007 MLS Supplemental Draft. Michael Todd was selected by the Kansas City Wizards, and Gary Flood was selected by the New England Revolution. Both Todd and Flood helped the Surf earn their first victory, an 11–6 win over the Massachusetts Twisters, the same weekend as their selection, January 20, 2007.

== Year-By-Year ==
Year	League	Logo	Record	Notes
2006/2007	AISL			
