= Connally Edozien =

Nigerian soccer player

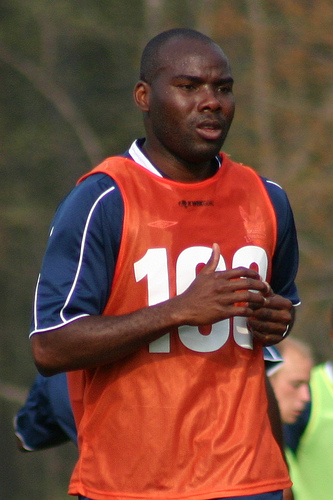
- Edozien in 2007

Personal information
- Date of birth: 26 June 1978 (age 48)
- Place of birth: Lagos, Nigeria
- Height: 1.83 m (6 ft 0 in)
- Position: Forward

Youth career
- 1999–2000: Embry–Riddle Eagles

Senior career*
Years	Team	Apps	(Gls)
2000–2001	FV Dresden-Nord		
2002	Cincinnati Riverhawks	16	(1)
2003–2004	Bastia B		
2004	Cincinnati Excite (indoor)		
2004–2005	Cleveland Force (indoor)	4	(0)
2005–2006	Cincinnati Excite (indoor)		
2005	New England Revolution	9	(0)
2006	Rochester Raging Rhinos	22	(4)
2007–2008	Carolina RailHawks	42	(9)
2007–2008	Orlando Sharks (indoor)	12	(2)
2008–2009	Miami FC	19	(2)

Managerial career
- 2007–: Middle Tennessee State University (assistant)
- * Club domestic league appearances and goals

Connally Edozien (born 26 June 1978) is a Nigerian former professional footballer who played as a forward.

== Playing career ==
=== Youth and college ===
Edozien was born in Lagos, Nigeria, but spent much of his youth in London. He came to the United States in 1997 to attend Embry–Riddle Aeronautical University in Daytona Beach, Florida, where he was an All-American and earned Florida Sun Conference Player of the Year in 1999 and 2000. He was the Regional XIV Player of the Year in 1999 and 2000, as well as a four-time All-Region and All-Conference performer. Edozien is the all-time leader in points at Embry–Riddle.

=== Professional ===
After college, Edozian played for FV Dresden-Nord in Dresden, Germany. In March 2002, he signed with the Cincinnati Riverhawks after impressing during a February 2002 trial. From 2003 to 2004 he also played for the SC Bastia's reserves in France. In the fall of 2004, he signed with the Cincinnati Excite in the American Indoor Soccer League. He caught the eye of the coach of the Cleveland Force of the Major Indoor Soccer League during an exhibition game between the Excite and Force. This led to the Force signing him to a five-game contract on 23 November 2004. He failed to score a goal and the team released him after four games. On 17 February 2005, he returned to the Excite, scoring two goals in the team's last two games of the season. He would also play the 2005–2006 winter indoor season with the Excite.

On 21 March 2005, Edozien signed with the New England Revolution of Major League Soccer. He played nine games, never scoring in league play, and was released at the end of the 2005 season. In 2006, he spent one season with the Rochester Raging Rhinos before moving to the Carolina RailHawks in 2007. He led the team in scoring that season, but was traded to Miami FC in August 2008 in exchange for Eddie Gutierrez. In the fall of 2007, he signed with the expansion Orlando Sharks of MISL.

== Coaching career ==
Beginning in 2007, Edozian became an assistant coach with the men's soccer team at Middle Tennessee State University.

In 2008, Edozien joined North Carolina's Triangle Futbol Club as head coach for the '94 Navy Ladies and the '93 Navy Men teams.
