= Academica Futebol Club =

Academica FC
- Full name: Academica Futebol Club
- Short name: AFC
- Founded: 2003
- Ground: Quinnipiac Park
- Owner: Tony Horta
- League: Multiple

Academica Futebol Club (AFC), is an American soccer club based in Cheshire, Connecticut.

== History ==
AFC was founded in 2003 and has grown to a soccer organization with a youth academy, boys and girls clubs, a minor league team, and a team in the Women's Premier Soccer League known as the New England Mutiny.

== American Indoor Soccer League ==
In 2003 AFC fielded a team known as Connecticut Academica F.C. in the inaugural season of the American Indoor Soccer League, and also playing in the 2004–2005 winter Premier Arena Soccer League season.

=== Year-By-Year ===
Year	League	Logo	Reg. season	Notes
2003	AISL			Lost in Finals
2004–2005	PASL			
