= Heinz Wirtz =

German footballer (born 1953)

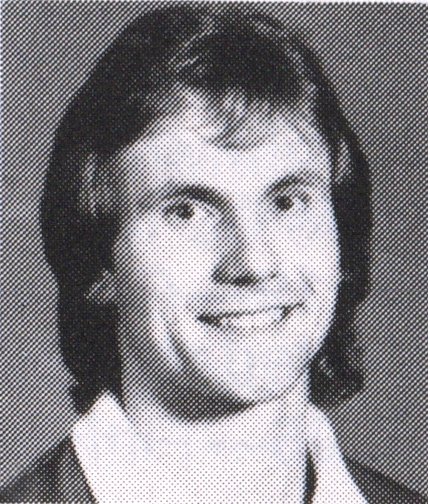
- Wirtz circa 1984

Personal information
- Date of birth: 10 November 1953 (age 72)
- Place of birth: Ameln, North Rhine-Westphalia, West Germany
- Height: 1.77 m (5 ft 10 in)
- Position: Defender

Senior career*
Years	Team	Apps	(Gls)
1979–1981	Fortuna Düsseldorf	34	(1)
1981	Washington Diplomats	26	(4)
1982–1985	Baltimore Blast (indoor)	151	(82)
1985–1988	Chicago Sting (indoor)	128	(33)
1989	Chicago Schwaben		
1990	Orlando Lions		

Managerial career
- 1990: Illinois Thunder
- * Club domestic league appearances and goals

Heinz Wirtz (born 10 November 1953) is a German former professional footballer who played as a defender. He played professionally in the Bundesliga, the North American Soccer League, the Major Indoor Soccer League and American Professional Soccer League. He also coached in the National Professional Soccer League. He is a member of the Triple Nine Society.

== Career ==
In 1981, Wirtz played for the Washington Diplomats of the North American Soccer League. In February 1982, he signed with the Baltimore Blast of the Major Indoor Soccer League. He would go on to play three seasons with the Blast and was inducted into the team's hall of fame in 2007. In November 1985, the Blast sold Wirtz' contract to the Chicago Sting for $5,000. He retired in 1988. In 1989, he played for the amateur Chicago Schwaben. In 1990, he signed with the Orlando Lions of the American Professional Soccer League.

In the fall of 1990, he was hired to coach the Illinois Thunder of the National Professional Soccer League.

== Honours ==
Fortuna Düsseldorf

- DFB-Pokal: 1979–80

Individual

- MISL All-Star Team: 1983, 1988
- All MISL Team – First team selection: 1983
