= Agricenter Showplace Arena =

Sports arena in Cordova, Tennessee, US

Coordinates: 35°7′51.10″N 89°47′59.43″W

Agricenter Showplace Arena is a sports arena located in Cordova, Tennessee. It was built in 1985 and holds 4,500 people. It is not a host to the Memphis Mojo indoor soccer franchise. It is known mainly for its rodeos that it hosts.
