= Big E Coliseum =

Arena in West Springfield, Massachusetts, US

Eastern States Coliseum
- The Big E Coliseum
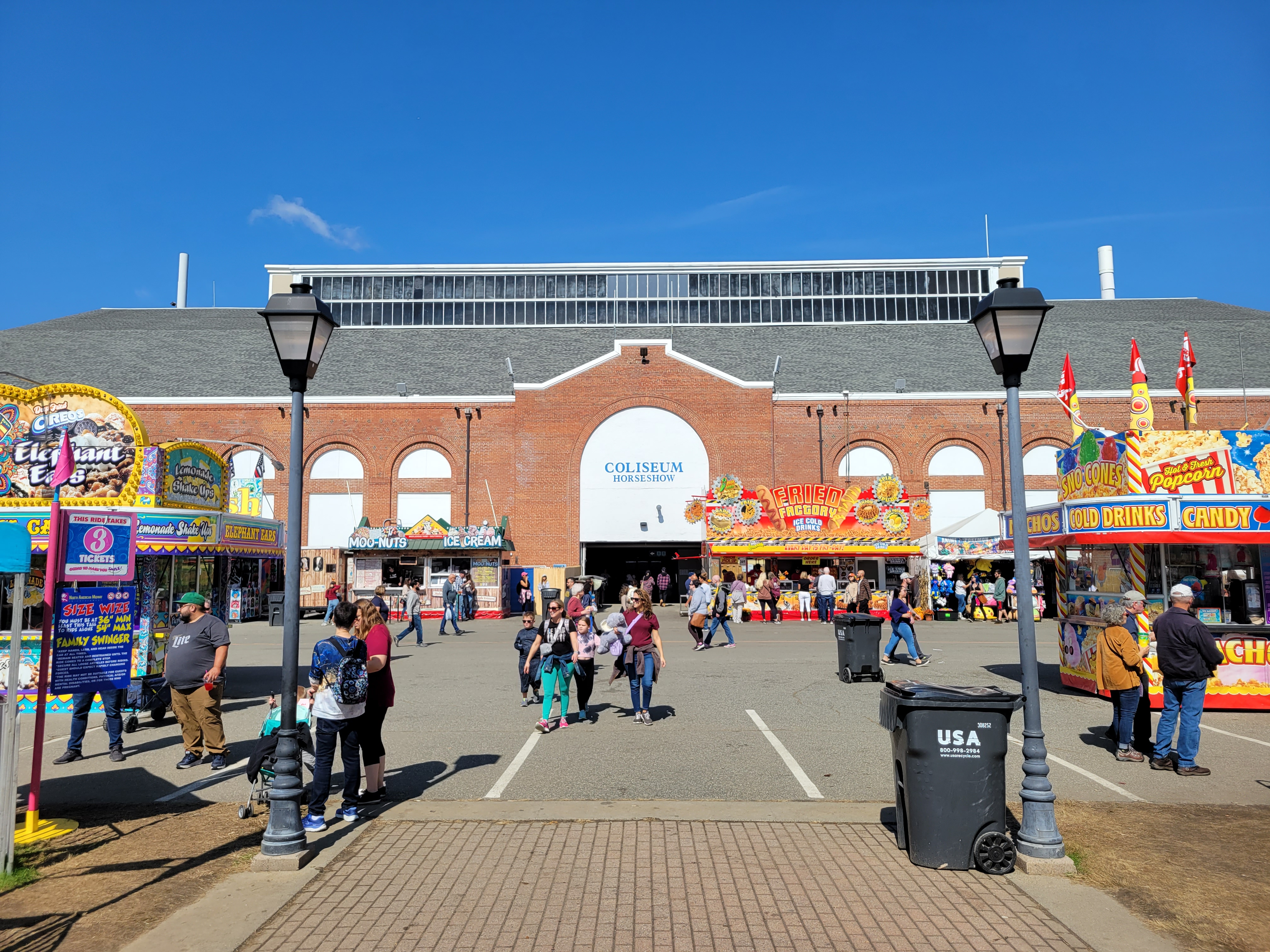
- Interactive map of Eastern States Coliseum
- Location: West Springfield, Massachusetts
- Coordinates: 42.091333°N 72.618694°W
- Owner: City of West Springfield
- Operator: Eastern States Exposition
- Capacity: 6,000
- Surface: dirt

Construction
- Groundbreaking: 1916
- Opened: October 12, 1916

Tenants
- Springfield Indians/Kings (CAHL/AHL) (1926–1933, 1935–1942, 1946–1951, 1954–1972, 1976–1980); New England Blades (EHL) (1972–1973); New England Whalers (WHA) (1974–1975); Massachusetts Twisters (AISL/NISL) (2003–2009)

Website
- Official Website

The Eastern States Coliseum, better known as the Big E Coliseum, is a 5,900-seat multi-purpose arena in West Springfield, Massachusetts.

== History ==
Built as the Eastern States Coliseum in 1916, adding to the facilities for the annual Eastern States Exposition, the Big E Coliseum was the longtime home of the Springfield Indians professional hockey team in the American Hockey League, and later served as a part-time home to the New England Whalers hockey team while the team was in the World Hockey Association. Until the Springfield Civic Center opened in 1972, the Coliseum was the Springfield area's main indoor venue. From the 1940s through the 1970s, it hosted local showings of the Ice Capades and the Ice Follies. It was for many years the largest capacity rink in western Massachusetts, and was the home arena of several local high school hockey teams as well as a prominent venue for regional and state high school tournaments.

In 1991, the ice plant was dismantled and hockey games are no longer played there. The arena continues as a venue for The Big E, and hosts Shriner circuses, equestrian shows and other local events. The Coliseum has often been the location for the draft horse World Championship Finals, serving as such in 1998, 1999, 2002, 2003, 2004 and 2009, and has been a venue for rodeos.

== Springfield Indians ==
The first game played in the new arena was a Canadian–American Hockey League game on December 1, 1926. Boxing promoter Tex Rickard dropped the ceremonial first puck. The Springfield Indians lost to the Providence Reds 3–1. In 1933, the parent New York Rangers decided to pull the franchise out of Springfield, but the Indians were back in the Coliseum for the 1935–36 season when Lucien Garneau transferred his Quebec Castors club to Springfield. Indians' manager John Ducey also managed the Coliseum during the 1941 to 1943 seasons.

When World War II broke out, the Indians had to be suspended for the duration of the war due to the Eastern States Exposition grounds being commandeered by the Quartermaster Corps of the United States Army for use as a depot. The Indians were back at the Coliseum for the 1946–47 season until 1972, when the team moved into the new Springfield Civic Center in downtown Springfield at the start of the 1972–73 season.

== WHA games ==
The New England Whalers played seventeen total games in the Coliseum while waiting for the Hartford Civic Center to open. They played four postseason games of the 1974 WHA playoffs and thirteen regular season games of the 1974-75 season in total before moving to Hartford.

Preceded by Boston Arena	Home of the New England Whalers; 1973 – 1975	Succeeded by Hartford Civic Center
