= Gary Flood =

American soccer player

Personal information
- Full name: Gary Flood
- Date of birth: September 7, 1985 (age 41)
- Place of birth: Hauppauge, New York, United States
- Height: 5 ft 10 in (1.78 m)
- Position: Midfielder

Team information
- Current team: Long Island Rough Riders
- Number: 5

Youth career
- 2003–2006: Hofstra Pride

Senior career*
Years	Team	Apps	(Gls)
2006–2007	New York Hampton Surf		
2007–2008	New England Revolution	10	(0)
2009–????	Long Island Rough Riders	51	(1)
- * Club domestic league appearances and goals as of July 1, 2012

Gary Flood (born September 7, 1985, in Hauppauge, New York) is an American soccer player who formerly plays for Long Island Rough Riders in the USL Premier Development League.

== Career ==
=== College ===
Flood attended Hauppauge High School and played four years of college soccer at Hofstra University. He was drafted by the Revolution in the 2nd round of the 2007 MLS Supplemental Draft and was signed to a developmental contract.

=== Professional ===
Flood saw limited time in his rookie season, making five appearances, usually as a defensive midfielder. Even though only making five appearances, he made two starts, one of them being the season opener. Due to being a defensive midfielder below Shalrie Joseph and Jeff Larentowicz on the depth chart, Flood saw as little playing time in 2008 as he did his rookie season, and the club did not renew his developmental contract after the 2008 season.

Having not found a professional club to play for in 2009, Flood signed with Long Island Rough Riders of the USL Premier Development League for the 2009 season.

== Honors ==
=== New England Revolution ===
- Lamar Hunt U.S. Open Cup (1): 2007
