= Expo Square Pavilion =

Multi-purpose arena in Tulsa, Oklahoma

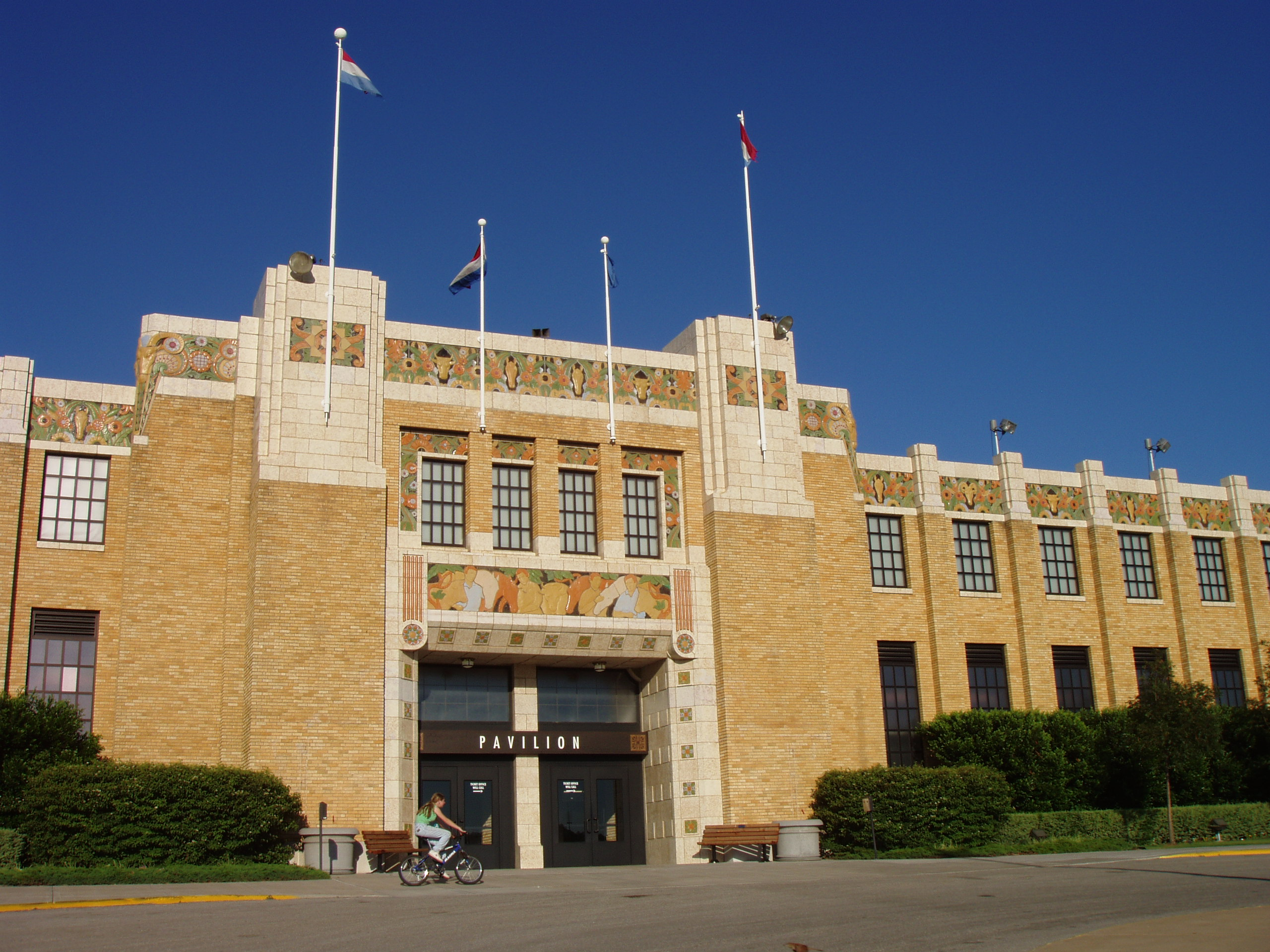
- Pavilion at Expo Square in 2006
- Interactive map of Expo Square Pavilion
- Former names: Tulsa Fairgrounds Pavilion
- Location: 4145 East 21st Street; Tulsa, Oklahoma
- Coordinates: 36°8′12″N 95°55′58″W
- Owner: Tulsa County
- Operator: Tulsa County Public Facilities Authority
- Capacity: 6,311

Construction
- Opened: 1932
- Architect: Leland I. Shumway

Tenants
- Tulsa Golden Hurricane (NCAA) (1947–1964); Tulsa Oilers (CHL) (1983–1984); Tulsa Roughnecks (NASL) (1979–1984); Tulsa Fast Breakers (CBA) (1988–1991); Tulsa Ambush (NPSL) (1991–1992); Tulsa 66ers (NBA D-League) (2005–2008); Tulsa Revolution (MASL) (2015)

Website
- www.exposquare.com

The Expo Square Pavilion, sometimes called simply The Pavilion, and formerly known as the Tulsa Fairgrounds Pavilion, is a 6,311-seat multi-purpose arena, in the Tulsa State Fairgrounds in Tulsa, Oklahoma.

It was built in 1932; the architect was Leland I Shumway. The building is in the PWA Art Deco style, built of blond brick with terra cotta ornamentation, and is considered one of the prime examples of Art Deco architecture in Tulsa.

It was home to the Tulsa Golden Hurricane men's basketball team from 1947 until the opening of the Tulsa Convention Center in 1964, the Tulsa Oilers Central Hockey League team in the 1983–84 season and the Tulsa 66ers, of the NBA Development League, until they moved to the SpiritBank Event Center in 2008. The Tulsa Roughnecks of the NASL used it for indoor soccer until the league's demise in 1984. It was home to the Tulsa Revolution of MASL for the latter portion of the 2014–15 season, the team's last.

It was also used as the venue for UFC 4, which was held on December 16, 1994. The Grateful Dead played its only Tulsa concert ever there on February 6, 1979. Currently, it is used for numerous events throughout the year, including the annual Akdar Shrine Circus.

Events and tenants
Preceded by Grady Cole Center	Ultimate Fighting Championship venue UFC 4	Succeeded by Independence Arena
