= Hidalgo La Fiera =

- Founded: 2012 (as "Rio Grande Valley Flash")
- Dissolved: 2014
- Ground: State Farm Arena; Hidalgo, Texas
- Capacity: 5,500
- Owner: Victor Fernandez
- Head Coach: Julio Garcia
- League: Major Arena Soccer League
- Website: http://lafierafc.com/

Hidalgo La Fiera (also known as "La Fiera FC") was an American professional indoor soccer team based in Hidalgo, Texas. They played in the Southern Division of the Major Arena Soccer League (MASL). The team was founded in 2012 as the Rio Grande Valley Flash when the Monterrey Flash left the Liga Mexicana de Futbol Rápido Profesional to move to Texas and the Professional Arena Soccer League. The PASL was rebranded as the MASL in May 2014. The team fell into financial disarray and, unable to reorganize, resigned their membership in the MASL effective December 23, 2014.

== History ==
The original RGV Flash logo, mirroring the Monterrey Flash logo, used until January 9, 2013

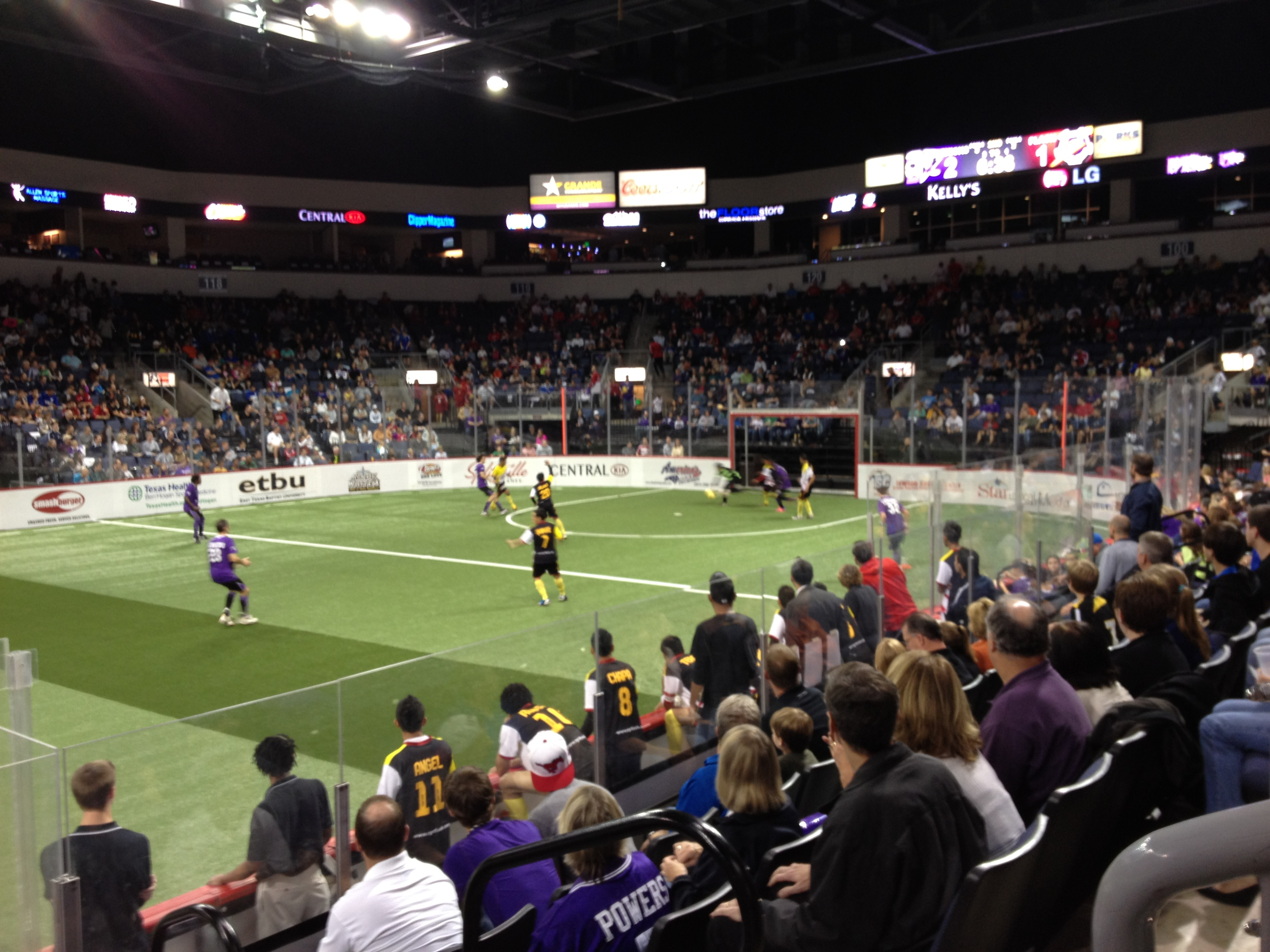
The Flash at the Dallas Sidekicks, November 30, 2012.

Attorney Gerardo Guerra Lozano founded the Monterrey Flash, and joined the Liga Mexicana de Futbol Rápido Profesional (LMFRPro) in 2011. They won the league championship in that first season. They also finished second in the 2012 FIFRA Club Championship, losing to the San Diego Sockers 5-3 in the championship.

2013 logo for the RGV Flash

Lozano then renamed his team, the Rio Grande Valley Flash and moved to Texas. The Flash was admitted to the PASL on September 27, 2012. The team's initial logo was identical, except for the city name, to the one used by the Monterrey Flash. The team revealed a new, sleeker logo at a press conference on January 9, 2013, at Ford Arena.

The Flash began their inaugural PASL season unevenly, losing 4 of their first 8 games, including 3 to the Dallas Sidekicks. In the latter half of the regular season, head coach Mariano Bollella's team won 8 straight games and qualified for the post-season. The Flash defeated the Sidekicks in consecutive games to win the Central Division Finals 2–0 and advance to the Ron Newman Cup Semi-Finals in San Diego, California. They lost that match to the Detroit Waza, ending their playoff run.

On July 2, 2013, the team announced that Victor Fernandez had assumed ownership and would take on the role of team president. Seeking to give the team an identity separate from the Monterrey club, the team announced that would operate with a new name, "La Fiera FC", colors (black, white, and gold), and logo (a stylized paw print in team colors with "La Fiera FC" and a lion head ingrained) for the 2013–2014 season. "La Fiera" translates from Spanish to English as "The Beast". After a league mandate, the team became known officially as Hidalgo La Fiera to reflect their home city.

With a new owner and a new name, the team returned to State Farm Arena as one of three Texas teams in the PASL. The team held its first local tryouts on July 8–9, 2013. In late July, the team announced Joaquín García Fernández as its new president.

With the expansion of the league and the re-branding to the Major Arena Soccer League, La Fiera moved to the new Southern Division for this season. All of the team's games were played or scheduled against in-division rivals in Texas and Mexico. On November 19, after two regular season games, the team announced that interim head coach Angel Hernandez had replaced Mariano Bollella. On November 28, Angel Hernandez and Joel Perez left the team and Julio Garcia was announced as the team's new head coach.

A last-ditch money-saving effort involved rescheduling 3 late-December home games for the team's practice facility, Golazo Soccer in Pharr, Texas. Before the first such game, the visiting Dallas Sidekicks filed a protest with the league about the inadequate playing facilities, including too-small goals. The league vacated the apparent 4–3 La Fiera win on December 23 and accepted the team's resignation from the league, ending both La Fiera's season and MASL franchise.

== Year-by-year ==
League champions	Runners-up	Division champions	Playoff berth

Year	League	Reg. season	GF	GA	Finish	Playoffs	Avg. attendance
2012–13	PASL	12-4	150	69	2nd, Central	Semi-Finals	1,549
2013–14	PASL	14–2	185	65	1st, Central	Semi-Finals	1,036
2014–15	MASL	4–3	48	52	6th, Southern	Folded at midseason	859

== Honors ==
- 2013-14 PASL Central Division champions
