= Tulsa Revolution =

- Full name: Tulsa Revolution
- Nickname: Revs
- Founded: 2012
- Dissolved: 2015; 11 years ago
- Ground: Expo Square Pavilion; Tulsa, Oklahoma
- Capacity: 6,311
- Owners: Shannon Clark; Adam Mellor
- Head Coach: Alex Miranda
- League: Major Arena Soccer League
- 2014–15: 6th, Central Division; Playoffs: DNQ
Home colors

The Tulsa Revolution was a professional indoor soccer team from Tulsa, Oklahoma, which began play in the Professional Arena Soccer League with the 2013–14 season then segued to the Major Arena Soccer League for the 2014–15 season. The team was co-owned by Adam Mellor and Shannon Clark.

Under the leadership of head coach Alex Miranda, the Revolution played their 2015 home games in the Expo Square Pavilion at the Tulsa State Fairgrounds in Tulsa, Oklahoma. The 2013 and 2014 home games were played at the Cox Business Center in downtown Tulsa.

The original Tulsa Revolution, also owned by Mellor and coached by Kerry Shubert, played in the Central Division of the American Indoor Soccer League in 2008.

== History ==
Based at the SoccerCity Indoor Sports Complex, the original Tulsa Revolution was the first professional soccer program in Tulsa since the Tulsa Ambush in 1992. One of two new teams for the American Indoor Soccer League during the 2007–08 season, the team posted a 2–5 record playing a partial season of just 7 games, compared to the league standard of 14. The AISL folded after that season.

On July 10, 2012, team owners Adam Mellor and Shannon Clark were awarded a franchise as an expansion team in the Professional Arena Soccer League for the 2013–14 season. The team played its home games at the Cox Business Center (formerly known as the Tulsa Convention Center). On July 2, 2013, the team named Michael Nsien as head coach and announced the Williams Companies as presenting sponsor for the 2013–14 season. The Revolution held open player tryouts in July 2013. The team began signing players in October 2013, starting with Tulsa native Levi Coleman, in preparation for their first game on November 1 versus the Illinois Piasa. The Revolution struggled on the field, winning only two games at home and none on the road to amass a 2–14 record. They defeated two non-PASL teams to advance to the Round of 16 in the 2013–14 United States Open Cup for Arena Soccer before falling to the Wichita B-52s. Tulsa's average home attendance of 866 fans per game was good enough to rank them 8th among the 20 teams in the PASL this season.

After absorbing several teams from another league, the PASL reorganized as the Major Arena Soccer League and the level of competition in the Central division went up sharply. The Revolution struggled on the field, beating only Oxford City FC of Texas for 1 win in 8 games in 2014, and at the box office. Their 513 fans per-game average at the Cox Business Center ranked them 20th in the 23-team MASL and prompted a mid-season move to Expo Square Pavilion at the Tulsa State Fairgrounds for 2015. On January 14, the team released first-year head coach David Yates after he led the team to a 1-9 record. On January 20, the team formally promoted assistant coach Alex Miranda to interim head coach for the remainder of the season. After turf issues forced the cancellation of one game, the team resumed normal operations at their new home arena. Ongoing financial issues forced the team to fold after last season.

== Year-by-year ==
League champions	Runners-up	Division champions*	Playoff berth

Year	League	Reg. season	GF	GA	Pct	Finish	Playoffs	Avg. attendance
2007–08	AISL	2–5	44	55	.286	5th	Ineligible	~700
2013–14	PASL	2–14	89	158	.125	6th, Central	Did not qualify	866
2014–15	MASL	2–16	77	212	.125	6th, Central	Did not qualify	513
