= Cincinnati Excite =

- Full name: Cincinnati Excite
- Founded: 2004
- Dissolved: 2008
- Ground: Game Time Indoor Soccer Training Facility
- Owner/President: David Galus

The Cincinnati Excite were a semi-professional indoor soccer club which played in the American Indoor Soccer League.

== History ==
The Excite are owned by David Galus, and took the American Indoor Soccer League season championship in the 2005/2006 season.

A number of Excite players took to the pitch during the summer of 2006 with the teams in the United Soccer Leagues. Five Excite (Marcel Matis, Salvatore Fiore, Michael McGinlay, John McGinlay, and Tiest Sondaal) players signed up with the Cincinnati Kings in the USL Second Division; while fellow Excite teammate, Connally Edozien joined the Rochester Raging Rhinos of the USL First Division. Michael McGinlay joined Bohemians F.C. in the League of Ireland during the summer of 2007.

In 2008 the Excite decided to take off for the 2008–2009 year, but never found another league. Most of the personnel transitioned to the new 1790 Cincinnati of the Professional Arena Soccer League.

== Year-by-year ==
Year	League	Reg. season	Notes
2004/2005	AISL	5–3 (15 points)	Second place in season/lost in finals
2005/2006	AISL	6–1 (17 points)	Season Champions
2006/2007	AISL	6–9 (18 Points)	Third Place in the Season
2007/2008	AISL	6–7 (16 Points)	Third Place in the Season
