= Arvest Convention Center =

Convention center in Tulsa, Oklahoma

Coordinates: 36°8′56″N 95°59′50″W

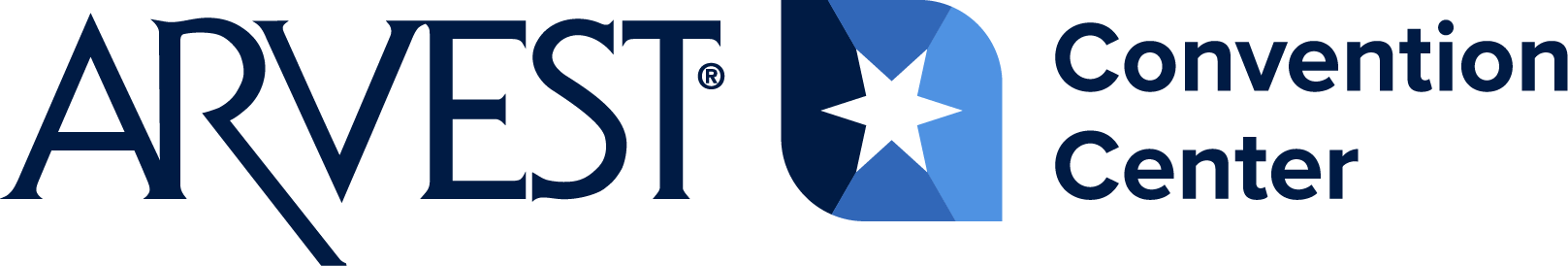
- Interactive map of Arvest Convention Center
- Former names: Cox Business Center; Tulsa Convention Center; Tulsa Assembly Center
- Location: 100 Civic Center; Tulsa, Oklahoma 74103
- Owner: City of Tulsa
- Operator: OVG (property management); ASM Global

Construction
- Opened: 1964

Website
- www.coxcentertulsa.com

The Arvest Convention Center (formerly the Tulsa Assembly Center, Tulsa Convention Center, Maxwell Convention Center, and Cox Business Convention Center) is a 275,000 square foot convention center located in downtown Tulsa, Oklahoma.

The Arvest Convention Center (ACC) was originally named Tulsa Assembly Center. It was later renamed Maxwell Convention Center after former mayor James L. Maxwell.

In February 2013, Cox Communications acquired the naming rights to the facility and renamed it the Cox Business Center. In 2020, "Convention" was added to the name. In 2025, Arvest Bank acquired the naming rights and renamed it to the Arvest Convention Center.

== 2018 CBCC's banquet hall renovation ==
The ACC began renovations to convert the arena into a banquet hall in 2018, with a scheduled completion date in 2020.

The ACC's banquet hall was the largest in the state at 30,000 square feet. However, the venue's $55 million renovations replaced the arena with the Grand Hall, a second Banquet space of 41,470 square feet, and 38 foot ceilings.

It also added a new South Plaza at the main entrance on the east side. This includes a three-story glass atrium, valet drop-off, and over 4,000 square feet of pre-function event space. The venue now offers over 275,000 square feet of total rentable space.

The renovation is part of Vision Tulsa, a community improvement initiative funded by a 0.6% increased sales tax in Tulsa County.

== BOK Center ==
The Bank of Oklahoma Center, or BOK Center, which the City of Tulsa owns, is the sister venue to CBCC, with both being managed by Oak View Group. The BOK Center is a 19,199-seat arena and home to the ECHL Tulsa Oilers, and the IFL (Indoor Football League) Tulsa Oilers. It also hosts major concerts and entertainment shows. It was designed to accommodate arena football, hockey, basketball, concerts, and similar events. The BOK is the former home of the Tulsa Shock of the Women's National Basketball Association and the Tulsa Talons of the Arena Football League.

It cost $178 million in public funds to build, as well as $18 million in privately funded upgrades. The center was completed on August 30, 2008.

== CBCC sport team history ==
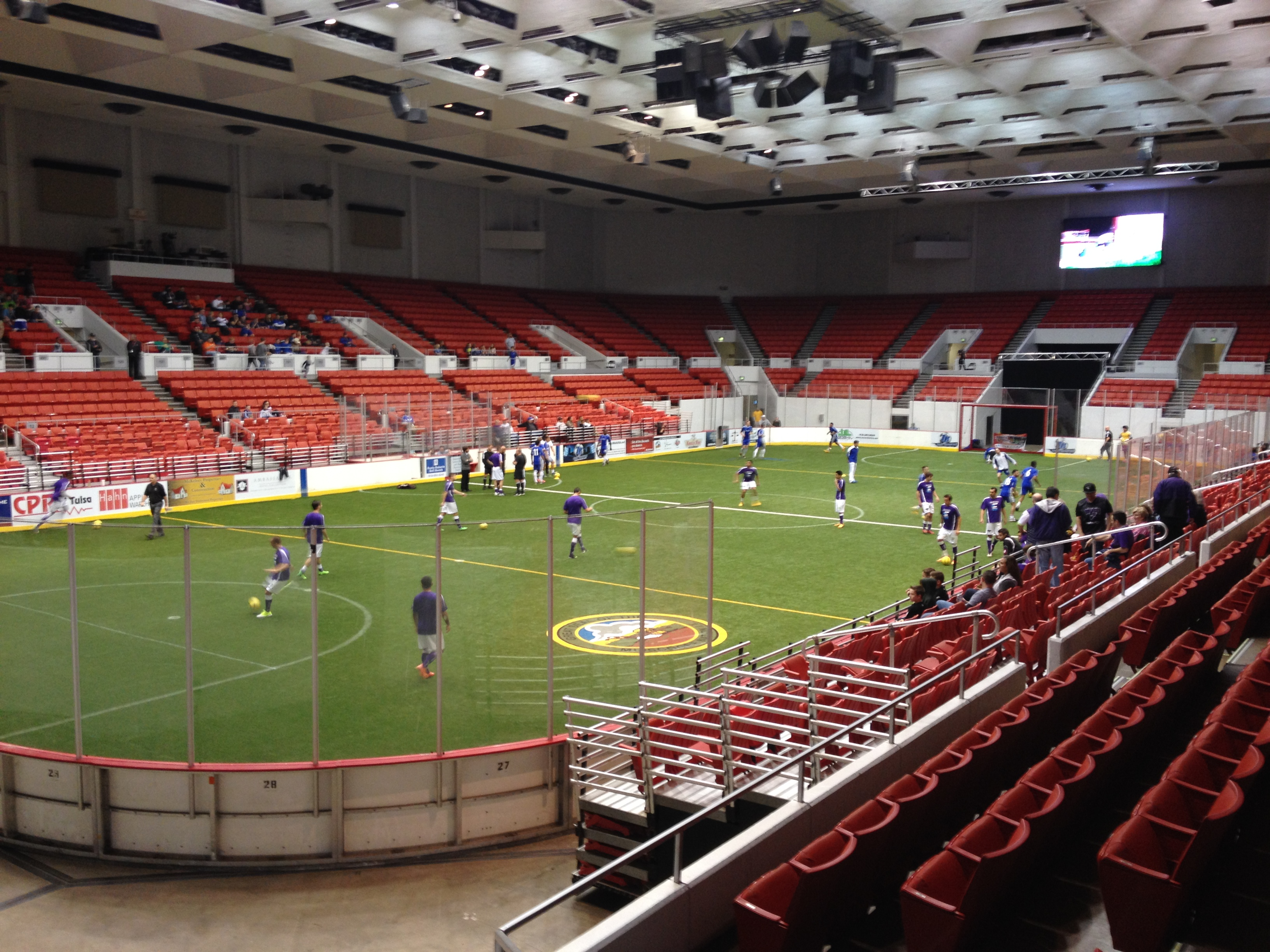
Tulsa Revolution warm-ups at Cox Business Center on November 22, 2014.

Logo until 2013

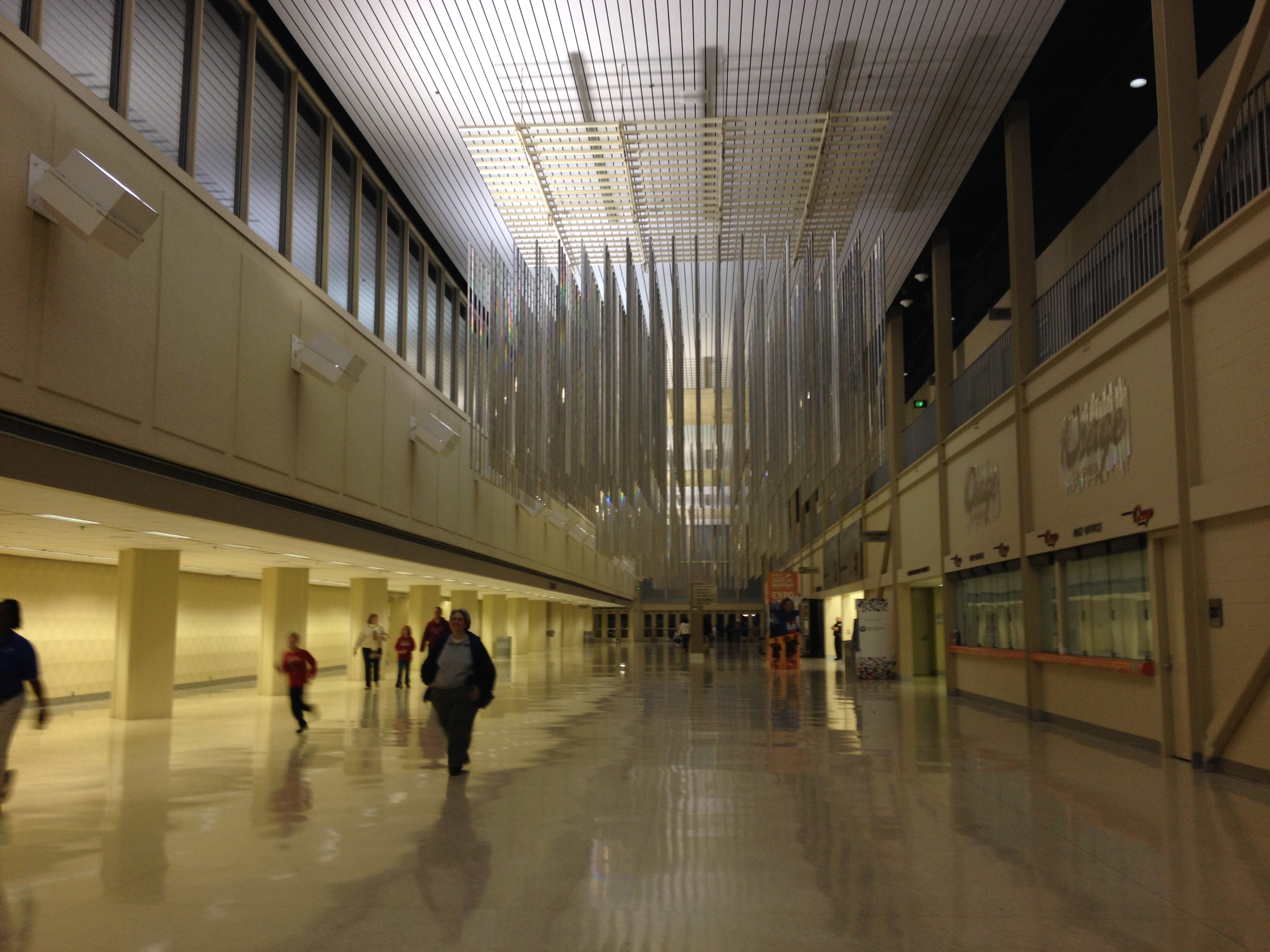
Lobby of the Arvest Convention Center.

The original Tulsa Roughnecks used the CBCC's building for indoor soccer in 1978. In November 2013, it became the home arena of the Tulsa Revolution of the Professional Arena Soccer League. The team relocated to the Expo Square Pavilion in January 2015.

The center was home to the Central Hockey League Tulsa Oilers ice hockey team and the Tulsa Talons arena football team before the opening of the new BOK Center in 2008. It was a regular stop for Bill Watts' Mid-South Wrestling and its successor, the Universal Wrestling Federation, until shortly after the UWF was purchased by Jim Crockett Promotions in 1987. It hosted the Missouri Valley Conference men's basketball tournament title game in 1982 and from 1984 to 1987. It was also the home to the Tulsa Golden Hurricane basketball team until the program moved to the Reynolds Center in 1998.

The Professional Bull Riders circuit hosted a Built Ford Tough Series event at the Convention Center between 2005 and 2008; since 2009, the event has been held at the BOK Center. From 2009 through 2012, the Convention Center was the home arena for the Tulsa 66ers of the NBA Development League. In 2013, the team returned to the SpiritBank Event Center in nearby Bixby. In March 2012, the now-defunct Oklahoma Defenders of the American Professional Football League played their first game at the arena.

== Concerts ==
Several famous artists have performed at the center, including Aerosmith, Zig Ziglar, The Doors, The Rolling Stones, Elvis Presley, Bon Jovi, Louis Armstrong, Led Zeppelin, Charley Pride, Jimi Hendrix, Sonny & Cher, The Carpenters, B.B. King, Glen Campbell, Waylon Jennings, Cheech & Chong, Van Halen, and George Strait.
