= Massachusetts Twisters =

- Founded: 2001
- Dissolved: 2009
- Ground: Eastern States Coliseum
- Capacity: 5,500
- owner: Paul LaPointe
- General Manager: David Decker (2001)
- Head Coach: Paul LaPointe
Home colors	Away colors

The Massachusetts Twisters were an American indoor soccer team that was based in West Springfield, Massachusetts, United States. Founded in 2001, the team played in the Arena Soccer League and every American Indoor Soccer League season and played one season in the National Indoor Soccer League.

The team played its home games at the Eastern States Coliseum. The team colors were black and red. Their head coach and owner was Paul LaPointe.

== History ==
The Massachusetts Twisters were a part of the Arena Soccer League and one of the charter members of the American Indoor Soccer League and were owned Paul LaPointe, the original commissioner of the AISL. The Twister's home field in The Big E Coliseum. The Massachusetts Twisters franchise was also directly affiliated with the Junior Twisters, who played in the Massachusetts Advanced Players League.

On March 31, 2007, having won the regular season in the AISL with 25 points, the Twisters hosted the AISL Championship against the Rockford Thunder, who had earned 23 points on the season. The Twisters prevailed 11–5 over the Thunder and claimed the league championship.

In 2007–08, the Twisters finished second in the AISL regular season standings with a 7–7 record. This led to a championship game rematch with the Rockford team, now known as the Rampage, which finished with a 12–1 regular season record. A few days before the championship game, the Twisters' coach resigned and several players quit the team, apparently because Twisters management had a dispute with the head coach, refused to pay for air travel for the team and required the players to drive to Rockford, Illinois instead. This led to a farcical championship game in which the Rampage destroyed the Twisters by an 18–5 score.

The Twisters originally announced that they would go on hiatus for the 2008–09 season. However, they later announced that they will play in the new National Indoor Soccer League, replacing the Orlando Sharks. In their first NISL game on November 15, 2008, the Twisters lost 34–11 to the Philadelphia KiXX. On December 27, 2008, the Rockford Rampage defeated the Twisters 43–0, marking the largest scoring differential in professional indoor soccer history.

The Twisters finished the season 1–17, with a point differential of -337, and the longest losing streak, 14 games. the Twisters also posted the lowest attended game in the National Indoor Soccer League, with 378 fans.

After the 2008–2009 season the Twisters left the National Indoor Soccer League and folded.

== Year-by-year ==
Year	League	Logo	Reg. season	Playoffs	Attendance
2002/2003	AISL		2 - 4 (6 points)	Lost in Semifinals	Not Recorded
2004/2005	AISL		2 - 6 (6 points)	Last in League	Not Recorded
2005/2006^	AISL		0 - 4 (0 points)	Last in League^	Not Recorded
2006/2007	AISL		8-5 (25 points)	Won Championship	994 Regular Season 1,695 for Championship Game
2007/2008	AISL		7-7 (19 points)	Lost Final	900
2008-09	NISL		1-17	Failed to qualify	458

^No playoffs were held, the league championship was decided based on regular season standings.

== Head coaches ==
Year	League
Eric Da Costa	2003–2007
Rob Libera	2007–2008
Paul LaPointe	2008–2009

== Arenas ==
- Eastern States Coliseum
