= Rockford Rampage =

American indoor soccer team

- Full name: Rampage Futbol LLC
- Founded: 2005
- Dissolved: 2013
- Ground: Victory Sports Complex (2007–2008; 2012–2013)
- League: American Indoor Soccer League (2005–2008); National Indoor Soccer League (2008–2009); MISL (2009–2010); Professional Arena Soccer League (2012–2013)
Home colors	Away colors

The Rockford Rampage were an American indoor soccer team based in Rockford, Illinois. The franchise played in the American Indoor Soccer League, the National Indoor Soccer League, the Major Indoor Soccer League (MISL), and the Professional Arena Soccer League (PASL).

== History ==
The franchise competed in the American Indoor Soccer League (AISL) as the Rockford Thunder in 2006–07. By 2008 it had been renamed the Rockford Rampage. The Rampage won the 2007–08 AISL championship, defeating the Massachusetts Twisters 18–5 in the title game on March 15, 2008.

Following that title, the Rampage joined the newly formed National Indoor Soccer League (NISL) for 2008–09. The league's original five-team lineup included Rockford, and the Rampage played their NISL home games at the Rockford MetroCentre. Rockford went 10–8 in its first NISL season, reached the championship match after playoff wins over Philadelphia KiXX and La Raza de Monterrey, and lost 13–10 to the Baltimore Blast.

The Rampage competed in the MISL in 2009–10, remaining at the Rockford MetroCentre. In 2012, Rockford returned to indoor soccer in the PASL, with home games at the Victory Sports Complex in Loves Park, Illinois.

== Year-by-year ==
Year	League	Logo	Reg. season	Playoffs	Avg. attendance^{†}
2005–06	AISL		4th AISL, 0-2 (0 Points)	Did not qualify	Not recorded
2006–07	AISL		2nd AISL, 8-4 (23 Points)	Lost championship, 0-1	Not recorded
2007–08	AISL		1st AISL, 12-1 (31 Points)	Won Championship, 1-0	545
2008–09	NISL		2nd NISL, 10-8	Lost championship, 2-2	1,242
2009–10	MISL III		5th MISL, 7-13	Did not qualify	1,112
2012–13	PASL		4th PASL Central, 7-9	Did not qualify	244
Total			47-46; Win % = .505	3-3; Win % = .500	894^{†}

^{†}Two seasons not recorded.

== Head coaches ==
Name	Years
Jeff Kraft	2005–2012

== Arenas ==
- Victory Sports Complex 2007–2008; 2012–2013
- Rockford MetroCentre 2005–2007; 2008–2011
