= American Indoor Soccer League =

US indoor soccer league

- Founded: 2002
- Folded: 2008
- Country: United States
- Last champions: Rockford Rampage
- Website: aisl.org

The American Indoor Soccer League was a semi-professional indoor soccer league founded in 2002 and folded in 2008.

== History ==
Founded in 2002, the AISL's headquarters were in West Springfield, Massachusetts, but the media relations office was in Cleveland, Ohio. The circuit positioned itself as a minor league and did not intend to compete with top-level indoor soccer.

The league's inaugural match featured the Massachusetts Twisters defeating Connecticut Academica, 9–6, on January 4, 2003. Four teams, Connecticut Academica, Massachusetts Aztecs, Massachusetts Twisters and New Hampshire Storm, played a six-match regular-season schedule in 2003, from January through March, followed by semifinal and final matches. The Canadian World Cup All-Stars, based in Laval, Canada were associated with the league but not eligible for the playoffs. Games played by league members against this team, frequently called Montréal, were friendlies and did not count in the league standings. The Aztecs finished the regular season 6–0 and won the championship with a 9–6 victory over Academica in front of a home sellout crowd on March 29, 2003.

Late in 2003, the AISL announced it had secured several investors for expansion franchises and that, in order to prepare for the expanded league, the AISL would resume play for its second season in 2004–05.

Only the Twisters returned for the 2004–05 season, and statements by the league indicating the number of teams would swell precipitously did not come to fruition. The Cincinnati Excite, Detroit/Windsor Border Stars and New Mexico Storm were added as expanion teams, leaving the league's size at four teams. The Border Stars beat the Excite for the league title.

The 2005–06 season started with promise, starting with six teams, but the New Mexico Storm and Detroit-Windsor Border Stars decided not to play in the AISL just before the season got under way. The decision of the Border Stars came very late; the AISL had already released a schedule that included them along with a yet to be named expansion team in Chicago. Ultimately, the Chicago expansion team, which played its home games near Rockford, Illinois, was simply called Team Chicago. The Memphis Mojo joined the league during the 2005–06 season, and played a limited schedule but were not eligible for the AISL championship until 2006–07. Games against the Mojo in 2005–06 counted in the standings. Later in the season, another expansion club, the Rockford Thunder, began competing. Like the Mojo, the Thunder were not a league member and not eligible for the AISL championship, but games against them counted for their opponents in the standings. The Excite won the final game of the AISL regular season at Massachusetts, beating the Twisters, 11–2, to finish 6–1 with the regular-season championship. There was no postseason in 2006.

In 2006, the league announced the membership of the Canton Crusaders, but the team's membership was revoked after the ownership was unable to fulfill its financial obligations. The New York Hampton Surf also joined the league. The team was initially named the New York Empire but changed its name before the start of the season. Team Chicago and the Memphis Mojo did not return for the 2006–07 season. The Rockford Thunder were admitted to the league as a full member, giving the league four teams. The Twisters finished first in the regular season and defeated the Excite in the championship game. The crowd of 1,920 was a new AISL attendance record.

The AISL added the Northern Illinois Rebels and Tulsa Revolution for the 2007–08 season, while announcing the Hampton Surf franchise had been terminated. The Thunder changed their name to the Rockford Rampage. Cincinnati and Massachusetts returned, giving the league an all-time high five teams. However, the Revolution played an abbreviated schedule and were not eligible for the AISL championship. The Rampage finished first in the regular season and then defeated the Twisters in a rematch of the previous season's championship game.

In 2008, with the Cincinnati Excite going on hiatus, and the Massachusetts Twisters and Rockford Rampage moving to the National Indoor Soccer League, the 2008–09 campaign was canceled. On December 23, 2008, all news stories were dropped from the website.

== Rules ==
Like many other indoor soccer leagues, the AISL also had their own variations on the generally-followed indoor soccer rules. Some of these variations were:

- A point system that consisted of 1, 2, and 3 point goals, depending on how far away from the net the shot was taken.
- No three lines rule.
- One timeout per half per team.
- Similar to the MSL, a goalkeeper could "...not use his hands when team-mate passes the ball back. Only after a shot from the opposing team, can you pass back to the keepers hands inside your third line. ( Rebounds, etc...) No direct pass back to keeper outside the third of field to hands."
- The clock did not stop unless the ball went out of play in the last two minutes of the fourth quarter.

== Teams ==
Team	City/Area	Arena	Years
Cincinnati Excite	Cincinnati, Ohio	Game Time Indoor Soccer Training Facility (Note: The Excite played their home games at the Tri-County Soccerplex during their first two seasons.)	2004–08
Canton Crusaders	Canton, Ohio	Canton Civic Center	N/A
Team Chicago	Rockford, Illinois	Unspecified (Note: Team Chicago was scheduled to host Cincinnati on January 21, 2006, in their home opener at an unspecified venue in Rockford, Illinois. The match was never played.)	2005–06
Connecticut Academica FC	Cheshire, Connecticut	Sports Domain	2003
Detroit/Windsor Border Stars	Windsor, Ontario	Novelletto Rosati Complex	2004–05
Massachusetts Aztecs	Beverly, Massachusetts	Soccer Etc.	2003
Massachusetts Twisters	West Springfield, Massachusetts	Big E Coliseum	2003–08
Memphis Mojo	Memphis, Tennessee	Agricenter Showplace Arena	2005–06 (Note: Memphis joined the AISL during the 2005–06 season with the expectation that the team would become a full member in the 2006–07 season. The Mojo played a match, losing to Cincinnati on February 11, 2006, in a game that counted in the standings for the Excite. This was the only AISL match ever played by the Memphis Mojo.)
New Hampshire Storm	New Hampshire		2003
New Mexico Storm	Albuquerque, New Mexico	Blades Multiplex Arenas	2004–05
New York Hampton Surf	Long Island, New York	Southampton Youth Sports Center	2006–07
Northern Illinois Rebels	Waukegan, Illinois	Lake County Sports Center	2007–08
Rockford Rampage (Note: The Rockford Thunder changed their name to Rockford Rampage before the 2007–08 season.)	Loves Park, Illinois	Victory Sports Complex	2005–08 (Note: The Rampage were a test franchise in AISL in the 2005–06 season and played as the Rockford Thunder. The Thunder won their only match of the 2005–06 season at home against Cincinnati on March 4, 2006, a match which counted in the standings for the Excite.)
Tulsa Revolution	Tulsa, Oklahoma	Soccer City Indoor Sports Complex	2007–08

== Previous champions ==
Season	Champion	Score	Runner-up	Host
2007–08	Rockford Rampage	18–5	Massachusetts Twisters	Rockford
2006–07	Massachusetts Twisters	11–5	Rockford Thunder	Massachusetts
2005–06	Cincinnati Excite	N/A	No postseason held; Excite was regular-season champion.	
2004–05	Detroit-Windsor Border Stars	4–1	Cincinnati Excite	Windsor
2003	Massachusetts Aztecs	9–6	Connecticut Academica FC	Massachusetts

== Notable names ==
- Connally Edozien formerly of the Nigeria national team's youth system and New England Revolution. Edozien has played in the USL with the Rochester Raging Rhinos and is on contract with the Carolina RailHawks FC.
- Oscar Albuquerque current owner of the Rockford Thunder franchise played for Canada's 1980 Olympic qualifying team and in the National Professional Soccer League.
- Dayton O'Brien formerly with the University of Memphis, O'Brien was drafted by the Columbus Crew in 2006. O'Brien signed with the Memphis Mojo for the 2006/2007 season.
- Everson Maciel of the Western Mass Pioneers signed with the Massachusetts Twisters for the 2006/2007 season after a good season in the USL Second Division earned Maciel a spot on the USL 2 All League Team.
- Michael Todd of the New York Surf was selected by the Kansas City Wizards in the first round of the 2007 MLS Supplemental Draft.
- Gary Flood of the New York Surf was also selected in the 2007 Supplemental but in the second round by the New England Revolution.

== See also ==
- Major Indoor Soccer League (MISL)
