= 2015–16 Dallas Sidekicks season =

Dallas Sidekicks
2015–16 MASL season
- Head Coach/GM: Simon Bozas
- Arena: Allen Event Center; 200 East Stacy Road; Allen, Texas 75002
- Major Arena Soccer League: Western Conference, Pacific Division
- Highest home attendance: 4,486 (January 30 vs. Soles de Sonora)
- Lowest home attendance: 1,307 (January 14 vs. Tacoma Stars)
- Average home league attendance: 2,211 (10 games)

The 2015–16 Dallas Sidekicks season was the fourth season of the relaunched Dallas Sidekicks professional indoor soccer club. The Sidekicks, a Pacific Division team in the Western Conference of the Major Arena Soccer League, played their home games in the Allen Event Center in Allen, Texas. The team was led by new head coach Simon Bozas and assistant coach Nick Stavrou. The team struggled to recover from off-season turmoil and finished with a 7–13 record, missing the playoffs for the first time in the arena era.

== Season summary ==
The season began with a closer-than-expected loss to the Missouri Comets in front of the revived team's then-smallest home crowd to date. An overtime loss at home to the Las Vegas Legends was followed by defeat on the road against the Syracuse Silver Knights. A road loss to the Tacoma Stars was followed two days later by a win in Tacoma. Dallas played their next four games at home, all victories, defeating the San Diego Sockers, Brownsville Barracudas, and Saltillo Rancho Seco. While 2016 opened with a win, the Sidekicks lost a road game to Saltillo, won twice at Brownsville, then dropped consecutive home games to Tacoma, the Ontario Fury, and Soles de Sonora bringing their record to 7–8. Road losses to the Las Vegas Legends and Ontario dropped the team to 7–10 and eliminated Dallas from playoff contention for the first time in the arena era. Dallas ended its season with three losses in four days, losing the final home game in overtime to the Milwaukee Wave before roadtrip losses to Sonora and San Diego. The final 7–13 record is one of the worst winning percentages in overall team history.

== History ==
With some continuity in ownership, staff, and players, the Sidekicks claim the heritage of the original Dallas Sidekicks that won four championships as members of four leagues (MISL I, CISL, PSA/WISL, and MISL II) while playing at Reunion Arena in Dallas from 1984 to 2004. The new Sidekicks debuted as members of the Professional Arena Soccer League at the Allen Event Center in November 2012, posting a 13–3 record during the 2012–13 season before falling to the Rio Grande Valley Flash in the playoffs. For the 2013–14 season, the Sidekicks improved to 14 wins and 2 losses. For the 2014–15 season, the Sidekicks amassed a 14–6 record in the regular season and finished second in the Central Division. Dallas defeated Oxford City FC of Texas in the Southern Division Semi-Finals before losing to the Monterrey Flash in the Division Finals.

== Off-field moves ==
Head coach Tatu and the team parted ways in June 2015 over a payment dispute. The situation was resolved in October 2015 and Tatu rejoined the team as an ambassador of the sport.

Owner Ronnie Davis sold the team to Sidekicks Sports Management, LLC, in October 2015. Davis initially retained a minority share of the franchise and briefly remained with the Sidekicks as a consultant, until the Sidekicks Sport Management group: Bob Heckel, Sean Porter, and Craig Porter decided to lead the team in a different direction than Davis.

On January 30, 2016, the team distributed a Donruss-produced 20-card team set to fans in attendance at that night's game. The set includes cards for 20 Sidekicks players, including Jamie Lovegrove who had been kept off the field for the entire season by visa issues.

== Roster moves ==
The team formally signed new head coach Simon Bozas on October 20, 2015, after the completion of the sale of the team. The bulk of the Sidekicks initial roster was put under contract on November 6 with the rest of the opening day roster signed on November 11 and 12. On November 19, Dallas signed forward Arthur Ivo, defender Clint Ritter, goalkeeper Paul Hason, and midfielder Franck Mbemba. Defender David Kamali joined the team on December 2, 2015. On January 6, 2016, Dallas signed forward Gabe Arredondo and defender Clark Binning.

== Schedule ==
Win Loss

=== Regular season ===
Game	Day	Date	Kickoff	Opponent	Results		Location	Attendance
Game	Day	Date	Kickoff	Opponent	Score	Record	Location	Attendance
1	Friday	November 13	7:35pm	Missouri Comets	L 6–8	0–1	Allen Event Center	1,750
2	Friday	November 20	7:35pm	Las Vegas Legends	L 4–5 (OT)	0–2	Allen Event Center	1,635
3	Saturday	November 28^{1}	7:05pm	at Syracuse Silver Knights	L 5–9	0–3	Oncenter War Memorial Arena	1,616
4	Friday	December 4	7:35pm	at Tacoma Stars	L 3–4	0–4	ShoWare Center	2,148
5	Sunday	December 6	3:05pm	at Tacoma Stars	W 6-2	1–4	ShoWare Center	2,027
6	Saturday	December 12	7:05pm	San Diego Sockers	W 9-7	2–4	Allen Event Center	2,325
7	Saturday	December 19	3:05pm	Brownsville Barracudas	W 8-7	3–4	Allen Event Center	1,594
8	Tuesday	December 29	7:35pm	Saltillo Rancho Seco	W 6–4	4–4	Allen Event Center	2,130
9	Saturday	January 2	7:05pm	Brownsville Barracudas	W 10–4	5–4	Allen Event Center	2,713
10	Friday	January 8	8:05pm	at Saltillo Rancho Seco	L 6–7	5–5	Deportivo Rancho-Seco Saltillo	226
11	Saturday	January 9	8:05pm	at Brownsville Barracudas	W 5–3	6–5	Barracudas Sports Complex	124
12	Sunday	January 10	6:05pm	at Brownsville Barracudas	W 7–5	7–5	Barracudas Sports Complex	143
13	Thursday	January 14^{2}	7:05pm	Tacoma Stars	L 2–3	7–6	Allen Event Center	1,307
14	Friday	January 15	7:35pm	Ontario Fury	L 7–9	7–7	Allen Event Center	2,429
15	Saturday	January 30	7:05pm	Soles de Sonora	L 4–13	7–8	Allen Event Center	4,486
16	Friday	February 12	7:05pm	at Las Vegas Legends	L 6–8	7–9	Las Vegas Sports Park	428
17	Saturday	February 13	6:05pm	at Ontario Fury	L 3–9	7–10	Citizens Business Bank Arena	3,712
18	Thursday	February 25	7:35pm	Milwaukee Wave	L 6–7 (OT)	7–11	Allen Event Center	1,747
19	Saturday	February 27	7:05pm	at Soles de Sonora	L 8–12	7–12	Centro de Usos Múltiples	5,589
20	Sunday	February 28	2:05pm	at San Diego Sockers	L 3–8	7–13	Valley View Casino Center	5,032

^{1} Originally scheduled for January 31, 2016, at Missouri Comets. Rescheduled after collapse of Hartford City FC.
^{2} Originally scheduled for October 24, 2015. Rescheduled to delay start of Dallas' season.

== Personnel ==
=== Player roster ===
As of January 19, 2015 Note: Flags indicate national team as defined under FIFA eligibility rules; some limited exceptions apply. Players may hold more than one non-FIFA nationality.

No.	Pos.	Nation	Player
1	GK	USA	Juan Gamboa
2	DF	USA	David Kamali
3	DF	USA	Mike Jones
4	DF	USA	Clark Binning
6	DF	USA	Clint Ritter
7	MF	USA	R.J. Luevano
13	GK	USA	Jaime Ibarra
14	DF	BRA	Fabinho Leite
15	MF	USA	Cameron Brown
18	MF	ZAI	Patrick Shamu
19	FW	BRA	Arthur Ivo

No.	Pos.	Nation	Player
25	FW	COL	Rubencho Hernandez
26	MF	USA	Gustavo Piedra
29	DF	ECU	Ray Aguayo
33	DF	USA	Cody Ellis
34	MF	CGO	Franck Mbemba
37	FW	USA	VcMor Eligwe
77	DF	USA	T.J. Nelson
79	MF	BRA	Ricardinho Cavalcante
86	GK	SRB	Dejan Milosevic
88	MF	USA	Michael Grba
99	FW	USA	Gabe Arredondo

Other players that logged time on the field for the Sidekicks this season include midfielders #28 Paolo Da Silva, #27 Henrique De Souza, and #21 Fernando Garza.

=== Staff ===
The team's new ownership group for this season is Sidekicks Sports Management, LLC. Key front office personnel included Chief Operations Officer Bob Heckel, Chief Financial Officer Craig Porter, vice presidents Kevin Lindstrom and Pablo Benitez, plus Ronnie Davis as director of sponsorships.

Game day staff included head coach/general manager Simon Bozas and assistant coach Nick Stavrou. The team's athletic trainer was Steve Parker. The team's public relations and communications director was Melissa Smith. The director of events was Nicolle Osborn and the director of operations was Sean Miller.

All of the Sidekicks' home games were aired live in high-definition on Time Warner Cable Sports Channel. The broadcast team included Norm Hitzges on play by play, former Sidekicks coach Gordon Jago with color commentary, and team historian Alan Balthrop. Most MASL games were streamed by Go Live Sports with select games streamed live by ESPN3. The in-arena announcer was John Clemens.

== Awards and honors ==
On December 9, 2015, forward Cameron Brown was named to the MASL's Team of the Week for his offensive efforts in a pair of road games against the Tacoma Stars. He was then chosen as Player of the Week in a poll of MASL fans.
