= 2014–15 Dallas Sidekicks season =

Dallas Sidekicks
2014–15 MASL season
- President/CEO: Ronnie Davis
- Head Coach: Tatu
- Arena: Allen Event Center; 200 East Stacy Road; Allen, Texas 75002
- Major Arena Soccer League: 2nd, Southern (regular season)
- Ron Newman Cup: Lost division final
- Top goalscorer: Freddy Moojen (39 goals, 13 assists)
- Highest home attendance: 4,670 (February 21 vs. Monterrey Flash)
- Lowest home attendance: 2,344 (January 18 vs. Oxford City FC of Texas)
- Average home league attendance: 3,631 (10 games)

The 2014–15 Dallas Sidekicks season was the third season of the relaunched Dallas Sidekicks professional indoor soccer club. The Sidekicks, a Southern Division team in the Major Arena Soccer League, played their home games in the Allen Event Center in Allen, Texas.

The team was led by head coach Tatu with assistant coach Nick Stavrou. Dallas amassed a 14–6 record in the regular season and qualified for the playoffs. They defeated Oxford City FC of Texas in the Southern Division Semi-finals before losing to the Monterrey Flash in the Division Finals.

== Season summary ==
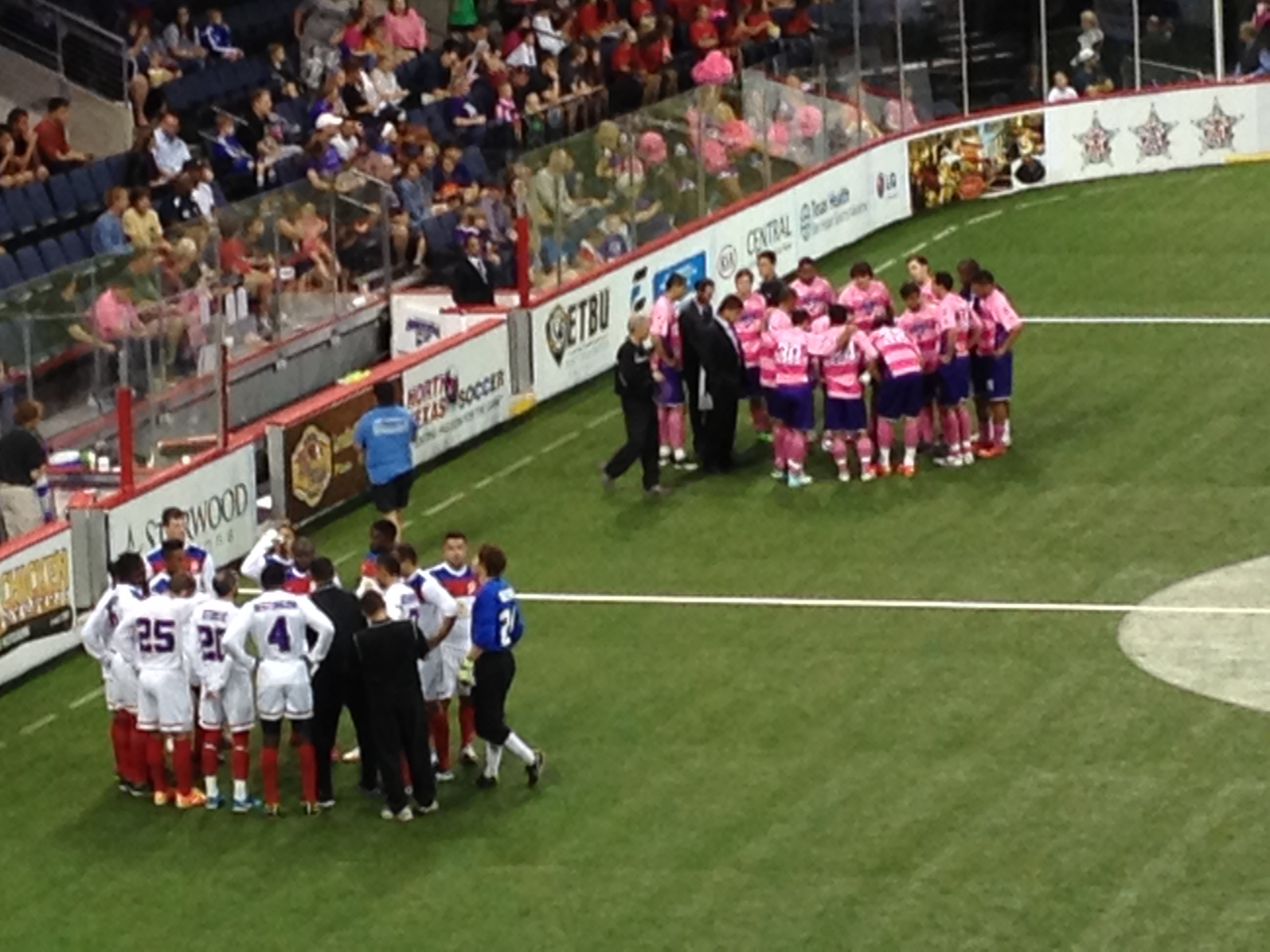
Missouri Comets and Dallas Sidekicks (in pink Breast Cancer Awareness Night alternate jerseys) on October 25, 2014.

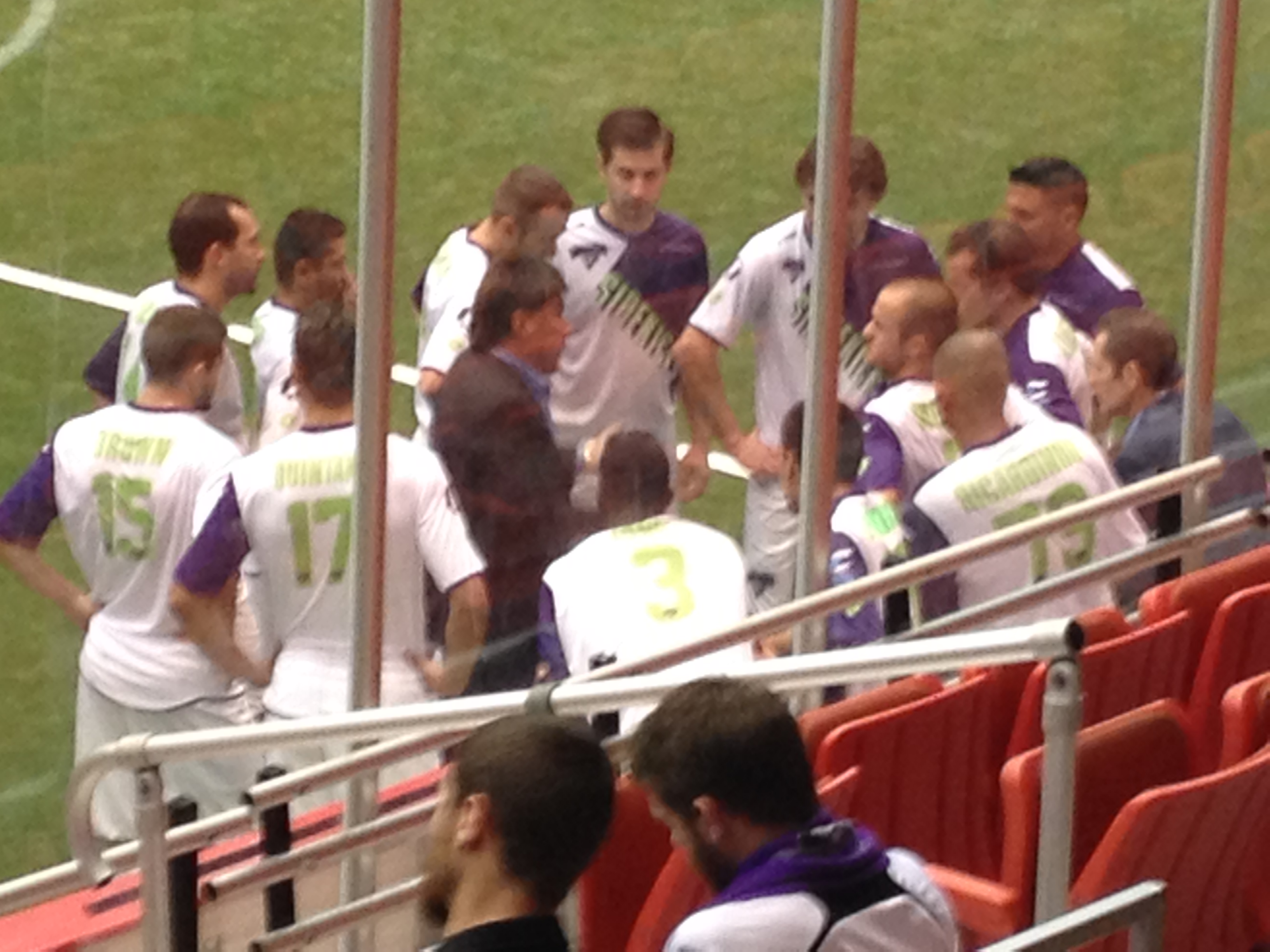
Tatu coaching the team at Tulsa on November 22, 2014.

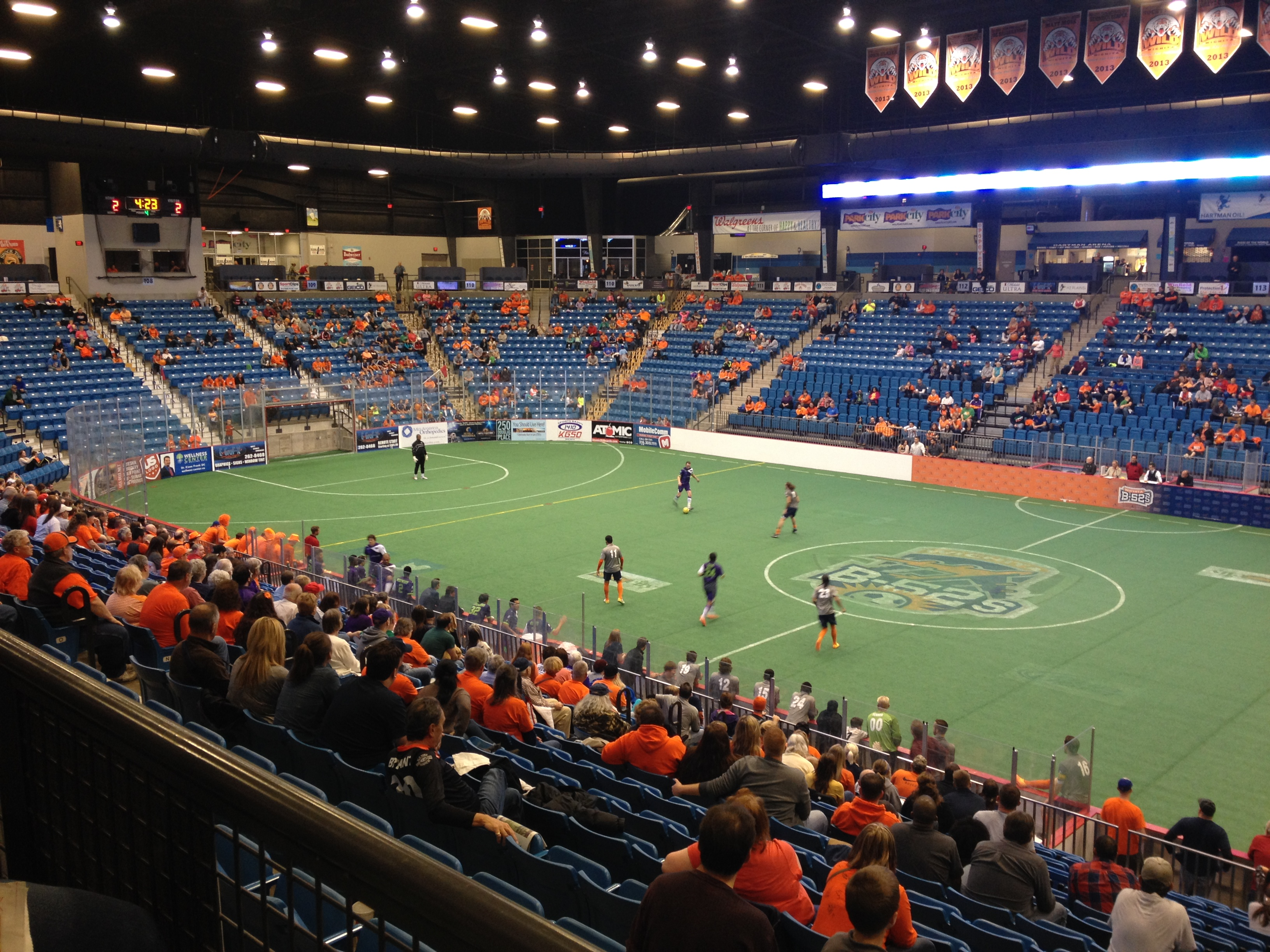
Sidekicks at Wichita B-52s on November 23, 2014.

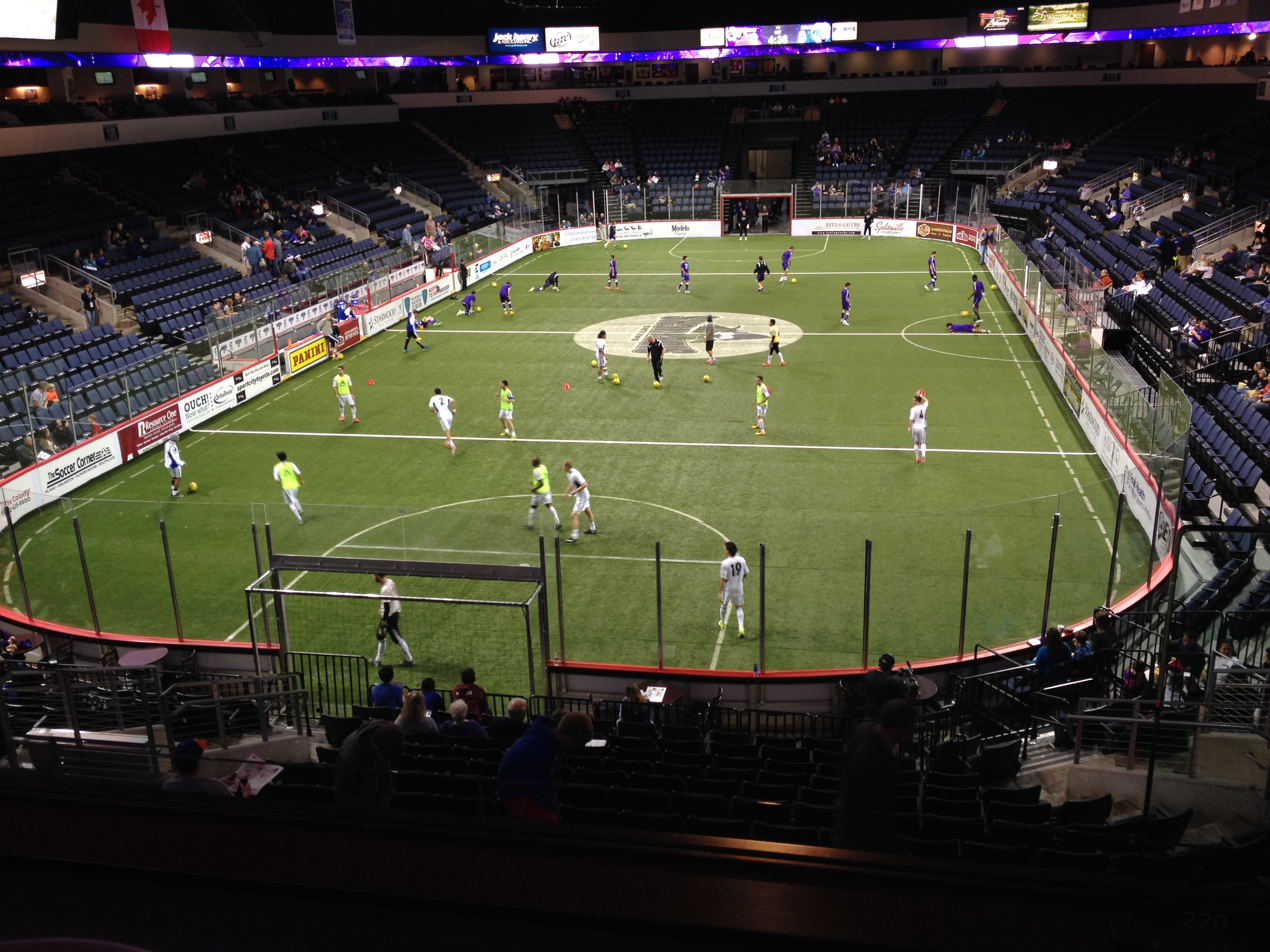
Tulsa Revolution on the road at Dallas on December 14, 2014.

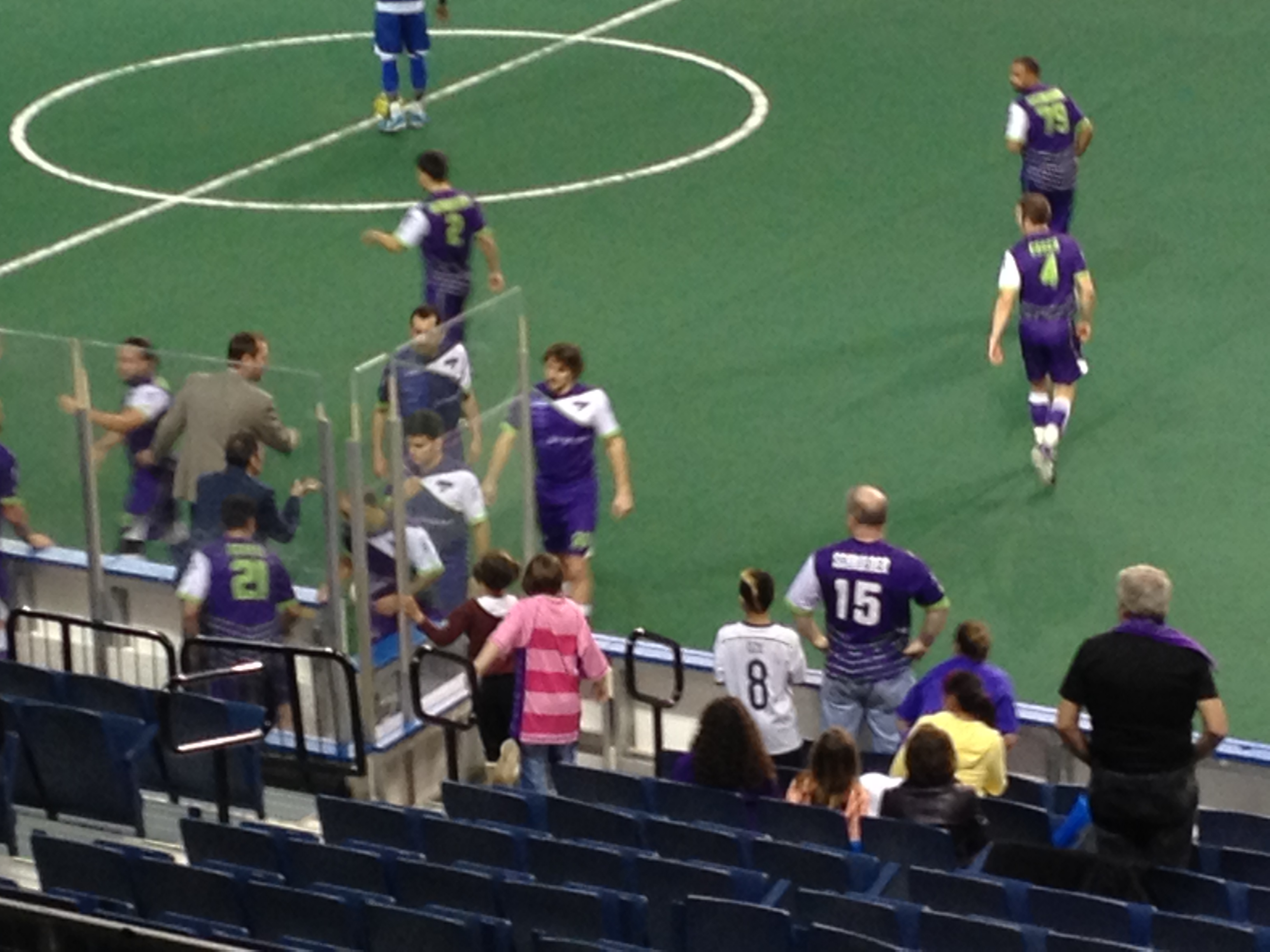
Sidekicks on the road at Ford Arena on December 27, 2014.

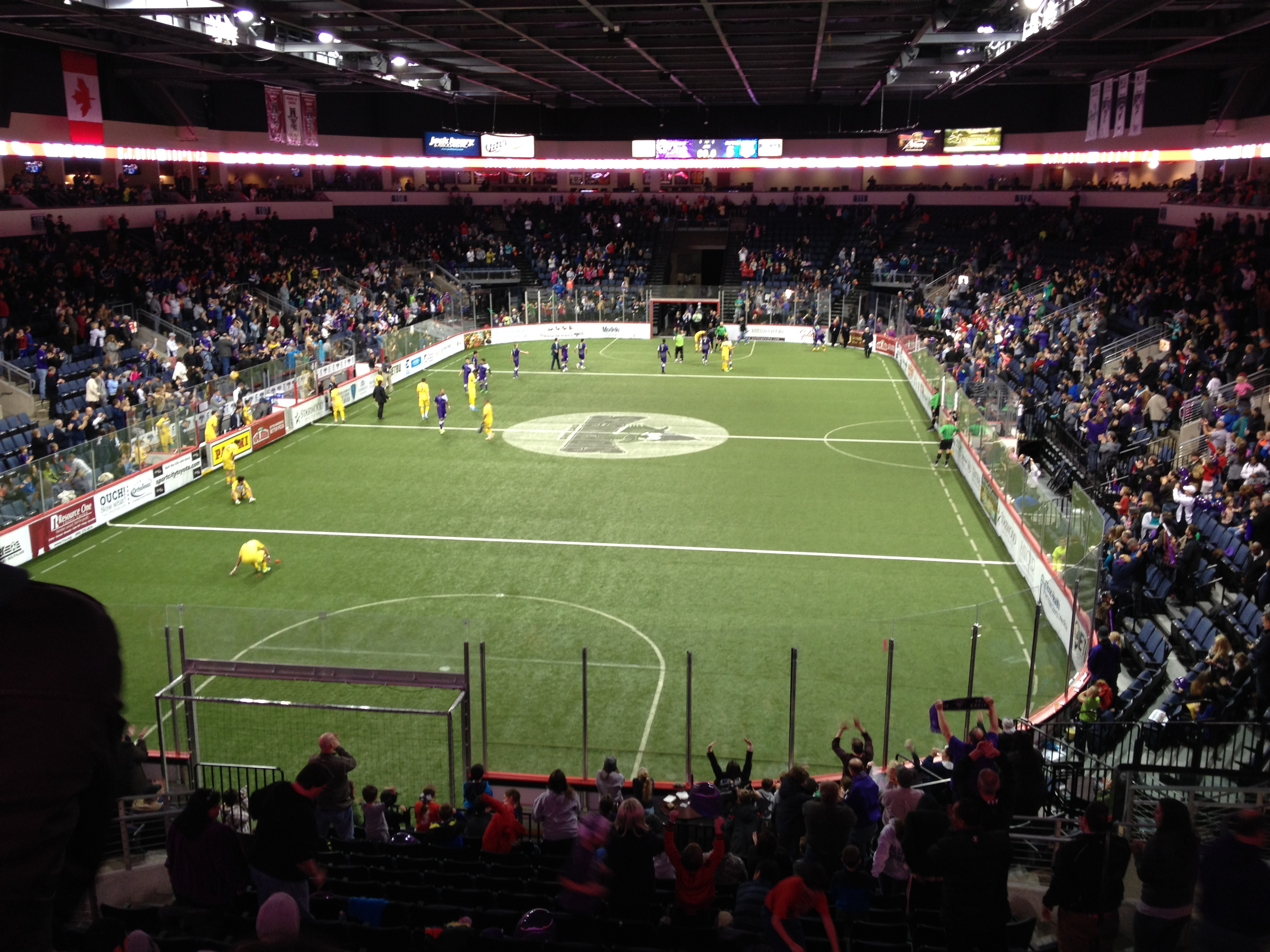
Dallas victory over Oxford City FC of Texas in playoff game on March 1, 2015.

The Sidekicks stumbled with an opening night loss to the Missouri Comets, the 2013–14 champion of the Major Indoor Soccer League. and suffered their first regular season home loss since the team returned in 2012. The team regrouped and won the next seven consecutive games before a controversial road loss to Hidalgo La Fiera at a practice facility that did not meet MASL standards. The league vacated the results of that game and Dallas regrouped to defeat Oxford City FC of Texas on the road. A loss at home to the same team plus three road losses in Mexico gave the Sidekicks their first regular season multi-game losing streak in the arena soccer era. Dallas regained its footing and won 6 straight games before a final loss at home to the Monterrey Flash to end the regular season. The team finished with a 14–6 record and second place in the Southern Division. The Sidekicks hosted Oxford City FC of Texas in the Southern Division Semi-final and won 6–5. They faced the Monterrey Flash on the road on Sunday, March 8, in the Southern Division Final and lost 1–11.

== History ==
With some continuity in ownership, coaching, and players, the Sidekicks claim the heritage of the original Dallas Sidekicks that won four championships as members of four leagues (MISL I, CISL, PSA/WISL, and MISL II) while playing at Reunion Arena in Dallas from 1984 to 2004. The new Sidekicks debuted as members of the Professional Arena Soccer League at the Allen Event Center in November 2012, posting a 13–3 record during the 2012–13 season before falling to the Rio Grande Valley Flash in the playoffs. For the 2013–14 season, the Sidekicks returned largely intact both in the front office and on the field, with a few roster additions to bolster the offense and improved to 14 wins and 2 losses. The team finished second in the Central Division but lost to the Monterrey Flash in the first round of the playoffs.

== Off-field moves ==
In May 2014, the Professional Arena Soccer League added six teams from the failed third incarnation of the Major Indoor Soccer League and reorganized as the Major Arena Soccer League. The 2014–15 MASL season will be 20 games long, 4 more than the 16 regular season games of recent PASL seasons. With the league expansion and reorganization, the Sidekicks moved from the Central division to the new Southern division. The other Southern teams for 2014–15 are the Brownsville Barracudas, Hidalgo La Fiera, Monterrey Flash, Saltillo Rancho Seco, and Beaumont-based Oxford City FC of Texas.

This season's regular home and road jerseys are supplied by Lotto Team Sport USA. The team also wore special pink jerseys on October 25 to honor Breast Cancer Awareness Month and special camouflage jerseys to honor Veteran's Day on November 15. The special jerseys were auctioned to raise funds for related charities. For the second consecutive season, the primary jersey sponsor is Starwood Motors.

On December 6, the Sidekicks began distributing player trading cards to fans at home games with each fan receiving 2 cards of a planned 18-card set. This is the current Sidekicks' third such set and the second to be produced for the team by Panini America. The set includes head coach Tatu plus Sagu, Jamie Lovegrove, Nestor Hernandez, Carlos Videla, Shaun David, Ricardinho, Angel Rivillo, Dominic Schell, Cameron Brown, Kiley Couch, Cody Ellis, Fabinho, Mike Jones, Dejan "Milo" Milosevic, Freddy Moojen, Renato Pereira, and Kristian Quintana.

== Roster moves ==
In August 2014, veteran defender Nick Stavrou retired after 14 seasons as a player to become the Sidekicks' director of soccer operations and an assistant coach, replacing Cesar Cervin. With the team's roster depleted by injury and penalty, Stavrou returned to the turf as a defender for the December 14 game against the Tulsa Revolution. He returned briefly to retirement on December 27 before being recalled on January 8 for roadtrip to Mexico and again on January 23 for a roadtrip to Brownsville.

On August 14, 2014, the team re-signed forward Bronil Koochoie for the upcoming season then later traded him to the Turlock Express. On September 25, the team signed veteran player Frederico "Freddy" Moojen. Previously signed with the Baltimore Blast, his contract was voided when the MISL collapsed.

The team conducted pre-season tryouts and training camp at Soccer Spectrum in Richardson, Texas, to fill out and upgrade the team's 20-man roster. MASL rules allow each team to dress up to 14 active players for each regular season game.

On October 24, the team signed midfielder Kristian Quintana to a contract. On October 25, star forward Nestor Hernandez was placed on the 30-day injured reserve list following knee surgery. On November 1, Kristian Quintana was assigned to Sidekicks Premier and rookie forward Thomas Knight Jr. was signed to a contract. On November 11, Quintana rejoined the team and defender George Williams was assigned to Sidekicks Premier. On November 22, defender Dominic Schell was signed to a contract and Thomas Knight Jr. was assigned to Sidekicks Premier.

On December 12, Nestor Hernandez was activated from the injured reserve list and midfielder Gustavo Piedra was assigned to Sidekicks Premier. On December 20, Piedra was recalled to the team, defenders Fernando Garza and R.J. Luevano were signed to contracts, defender London Woodberry and forward Renato Pereira were assigned to Sidekicks Premier, and defender Michael Uremovich was placed on the 14-day injured reserve list. On December 27, Piedra and forward Arthur Ivo were assigned to Sidekicks Premier and Pereira returned to the lineup.

The team began a series of roster moves on January 8 in preparation for the roadtrip to Mexico. Defender Mike Jones, midfielders Angel Rivillo and Kristian Quintana, and forward Renato Pereira were assigned to Sidekicks Premier. On the same day, defender Nick Stavrou was re-activated plus Brazilian and Mexican nationals John Machado and Andreas Salazar were signed as midfielders and Johnny Munoz was signed as a defender. On January 16, the team assigned Machado, Salazar, and Munoz to Sidekicks Premier, Stavrou was once again sent into retirement, and the team signed midfielder Alex Molano. On the same day, the Sidekicks acquired forward Alex Megson in a trade with the Rochester Lancers.

On January 17, the day before the Sidekicks hosted Oxford City FC of Texas, defender R.J. Leuvano was assigned to Sidekicks Premier while forward Arthur Ivo and midfielders Angel Rivillo and Kristian Quintana were recalled to the Sidekicks' roster. In preparation for a weekend two-game road trip to face the Brownsville Barracudas, the team returned Rivillo to Sidekicks Premier, recalled defender Mike Jones, and placed forward Shaun David on the injured reserve list with season-ending plantar fasciitis.

On February 1, the final day for roster moves this season, the team signed MLS veteran Hunter Jumper, recalled midfielder Angel Rivillo, activated Shaun David from injured reserve, returned defender Nick Stavrou to his coaching duties, and granted midfielder Jamie Lovegrove emergency leave to return to England.

== Schedule ==
Win Tie Loss Vacated

=== Pre-season ===
Game	Day	Date	Kickoff	Opponent	Results		Location	Attendance
Game	Day	Date	Kickoff	Opponent	Score	Record	Location	Attendance
1	Friday	October 10	2:00pm	at Tulsa Revolution	Tie 3–3	0–0-1	Soccer City Tulsa	
2	Friday	October 17	2:00pm	Tulsa Revolution	W 14–6	1–0-1	Soccer Spectrum (Richardson)	

=== Regular season ===
Game	Day	Date	Kickoff	Opponent	Results		Location	Attendance
Game	Day	Date	Kickoff	Opponent	Score	Record	Location	Attendance
1	Saturday	October 25	7:00pm	Missouri Comets	L 4–13	0–1	Allen Event Center	4,008
2	Saturday	November 1	7:00pm	Wichita B-52s	W 7–6	1–1	Allen Event Center	3,768
3	Saturday	November 15	7:00pm	Brownsville Barracudas	W 14–2	2–1	Allen Event Center	3,656
4	Saturday	November 22	7:05pm	at Tulsa Revolution	W 14–5	3–1	Cox Business Center	526
5	Sunday	November 23	3:00pm	at Wichita B-52s	W 3–2 (OT)	4–1	Hartman Arena	991
6	Saturday	December 6	7:00pm	Hidalgo La Fiera	W 7–3	5–1	Allen Event Center	3,907
7	Sunday	December 14	3:00pm	Tulsa Revolution	W 12–4	6–1	Allen Event Center	3,209
8	Saturday	December 20	6:05pm	at Brownsville Barracudas	W 11–3	7–1	Barracudas Sports Complex	575
--	Sunday	December 21	3:05pm	at Hidalgo La Fiera^{1}	3–4	7–1	Golazo Soccer (Pharr)	228
9	Saturday	December 27	7:05pm	at Oxford City FC of Texas	W 15–4	8–1	Ford Arena	1,203
10	Saturday	January 3	7:00pm	Oxford City FC of Texas^{2}	L 4–5	8–2	Allen Event Center	3,811
11	Friday	January 9	8:35pm	at Saltillo Rancho Seco	L 6–7	8–3	Deportivo Rancho-Seco Saltillo	?
12	Sunday	January 11	5:05pm	at Monterrey Flash	L 2–8	8–4	Arena Monterrey	1,758
13	Sunday	January 11	7:05pm	at Monterrey Flash^{3}	L 2–3 (OT)	8–5	Arena Monterrey	1,748
14	Sunday	January 18	3:00pm	Oxford City FC of Texas	W 5–4	9–5	Allen Event Center	2,344
15	Saturday	January 24	6:00pm	at Brownsville Barracudas	W 9–5	10–5	Barracudas Sports Complex	375
16	Sunday	January 25	6:00pm	at Brownsville Barracudas^{4}	W 7–6	11–5	Barracudas Sports Complex	375
17	Saturday	January 31	7:00pm	Saltillo Rancho Seco	W 11–3	12–5	Allen Event Center	3,833
18	Saturday	February 7	7:05pm	at Oxford City FC of Texas	W 7–2	13–5	Ford Arena	840
19	Sunday	February 15	3:00pm	Brownsville Barracudas	W 11–3	14–5	Allen Event Center	3,109
20	Saturday	February 21	7:00pm	Monterrey Flash	L 2–6	14–6	Allen Event Center	4,670

^{1} League vacated results on December 23 after upholding Dallas' protest of playing conditions.
^{2} Originally scheduled for Hidalgo La Fiera but rescheduled after that team left the league mid-season.
^{3} Mini-game to replace vacated Hidalgo game, maintaining 20-game schedule.
^{4} Replaces Hidalgo game originally scheduled for that date.

=== Post-season ===
Game	Day	Date	Kickoff	Opponent	Results		Location	Attendance
Game	Day	Date	Kickoff	Opponent	Score	Record	Location	Attendance
Division Semi-Final	Sunday	March 1	2:00pm	Oxford City FC of Texas	W 6–5	1–0	Allen Event Center	3,421
Division Final	Sunday	March 8	6:05pm	at Monterrey Flash	L 1–11	1–1	Arena Monterrey	6,113

== Personnel ==
=== Player roster ===
As of March 8, 2015 Note: Flags indicate national team as defined under FIFA eligibility rules; some limited exceptions apply. Players may hold more than one non-FIFA nationality.

No.	Pos.	Nation	Player
1	GK	BRA	Edilson "Sagu" Xavier
3	DF	USA	Mike Jones
4	DF	USA	Kiley Couch
7	FW	BRA	Freddy Moojen
14	DF	BRA	Fabinho Leite
15	MF	USA	Cameron Brown
16	MF	VEN	Angel Rivillo
17	MF	USA	Kristian Quintana
19	DF	USA	Fernando Garza
21	DF	GER	Dominic Schell

No.	Pos.	Nation	Player
24	FW	USA	Shaun David
25	FW	MEX	Nestor Hernandez
33	DF	USA	Cody Ellis
41	FW	USA	Hunter Jumper
77	FW	USA	Alex Megson
79	MF	BRA	Ricardinho Cavalcante
86	GK	SRB	Dejan Milosevic
89	FW	BRA	Arthur Ivo
91	FW	ARG	Carlos Videla
92	MF	USA	Alex Molano

Other players that logged time on the field for the Sidekicks this season include forwards #00 Thomas Knight, Jr. and #30 Renato Pereira; midfielders #32 Jamie Lovegrove, #19 Gustavo Piedra, #2 John Machado, and #16 Andreas Salazar; plus defenders #28 Dean Lovegrove, #2 London Woodberry, #84 Michael Uremovich, #84 R.J. Luevano, #84 Johnny Munoz, and #12 George Williams. Assistant coach Nick Stavrou also suited up as a defender (#23) for several games.

Only two players (#4 Kiley Couch and #15 Cameron Brown) participated in all 20 of the Sidekicks' regular season games. #14 Fabinho Leite missed only the December 14 home game versus the Tulsa Revolution.

=== Staff ===
The ownership group during this season included majority owner Ronnie Davis as team president and CEO, plus vice president Missy Davis, and minority owners Tatu (who also served as head coach), J.L. "Sonny" Williams, and Jim Tolbert. Assistant coach Nick Stavrou was also the team's Director of Soccer Operations. The team's athletic trainer was Steve Parker and Steve Wagner was the team chaplain. The team's public relations and communications director was Melissa Smith.

All of the Sidekicks' home games were aired live in high-definition on Time Warner Cable Sports Channel. The broadcast team included Norm Hitzges on play by play, former Sidekicks coach Gordon Jago with color commentary, and Alan Balthrop as broadcast statistician. Most MASL games were streamed by Go Live Sports with select games, including the October 25 season opener, streamed live by ESPN3. The in-arena announcer was KTCK personality Ty Walker.

== Awards and honors ==
Dallas forward Freddy Moojen was selected for the 2014-15 MASL All-League Third Team.

Dallas' Cameron Brown earned honorable mention for the league's all-rookie team for 2014-15.
