= 2013–14 Dallas Sidekicks season =

Dallas Sidekicks
2013–14 PASL season
- President/CEO: Ronnie Davis
- Head Coach/GM: Tatu
- Arena: Allen Event Center; 200 East Stacy Road; Allen, Texas 75002
- Professional Arena Soccer League: 2nd, Central Division
- US Open Cup: Round of 16
- Highest home attendance: 4,514 (November 2 vs. Wichita B-52s)
- Lowest home attendance: 3,392 (November 16 vs. Tulsa Revolution)
- Average home league attendance: 4,002 (8 games)

The 2013–14 Dallas Sidekicks season was the second season of the relaunched Dallas Sidekicks professional indoor soccer club. The Sidekicks, a Central Division team in the Professional Arena Soccer League, played their home games in the Allen Event Center in Allen, Texas. The team was led by general manager and head coach Tatu with assistant coaches Mike Powers and Caesar Cervin.

The team finished the 2013–14 regular season with 14 wins and 2 losses, an improvement from their previous season, and finished second in the Central Division behind the Hidalgo La Fiera. They advanced to the playoffs for the second consecutive season, where they lost in the first round to the Monterrey Flash.

== Season summary ==
The Sidekicks franchise started their second PASL season with a home win over the expansion Wichita B-52s and a road win over longtime rival San Diego Sockers. Through the new year, the Sidekicks maintained their perfect home record at the Allen Event Center while suffering road losses to the Ontario Fury and Hidalgo La Fiera. The Sidekicks finished the regular season with a 14–2 record and clinched a post-season berth. Dallas hosted the Monterrey Flash in the first round of the divisional playoffs on February 22. The Sidekicks lost 4–6, ending their playoff run.

Veteran goalkeeper Edilson "Sagu" Xavier started the team's first four games and earned a 3–1 record before being placed on injured reserve on November 17. Rookie keeper Dejan "Milo" Milosevic earned an 8–1 record during Sagu's recovery. Milo held the Wichita B-52s scoreless at Hartman Arena on January 4. This was the first shutout for the Sidekicks in the PASL era, the 7th shutout in PASL history, and just the 9th shutout in the complete history of the Dallas Sidekicks. Sagu returned to the lineup for the January 31 match versus the Las Vegas Legends and prevailed 8–6. Sagu finished the regular season 5–1 but lost the team's only post-season match,

The Sidekicks participated in the 2013–14 United States Open Cup for Arena Soccer, starting with a 16–5 victory over the Austin Capitals of the Premier Arena Soccer League in the Round of 32 on November 17, 2013. The Sidekicks' December 29, 2013, regular season 9–12 loss to Hidalgo La Fiera counted as both teams' Round of 16 match, ending the Sidekicks run in the tournament.

== History ==
With some continuity in ownership, coaching, and players, the Sidekicks claim the heritage of the original Dallas Sidekicks that won four championships in three leagues while playing at Reunion Arena in Dallas from 1984 to 2004. The new Sidekicks debuted at the Allen Event Center in November 2012, posting a 13–3 record during the 2012–13 season before falling to the Rio Grande Valley Flash in the playoffs. For the 2013–14 season, the Sidekicks returned largely intact both in the front office and on the field, with a few roster additions to bolster the offense plus new strength and performance coach Kyle Meadows.

== Off-field moves ==
The team established a developmental affiliate called Sidekicks Premier to play in the Summer 2013 PASL-Premier season during June and July 2013. Intended to allow rookies and prospects to perform in a structured setting as well as rehab returning veterans, the team played its home games at the Inwood Soccer Center in Addison, Texas. They compiled a 7–1 record, placing second in the South Central Division.

The Sidekicks ran a series of instructional camps for youth soccer players at multiple locations across Dallas County and Collin County in July and August 2013. On October 17, 2013, the team held a preview event for season ticket holders including a team scrimmage and an autograph session on the field at the Allen Event Center.

Scheduled promotional events for 2013–14 include a parade of teams on November 16, an alumni game on December 14, a "ring in the new year" event on January 2, club soccer night on January 25, faith and fellowship night (including a post-game concert by The Afters) on January 31, and another parade of teams on February 16. The team is distributing a Panini America set of Dallas Sidekicks player trading cards to attending fans over the course of the season. On November 9, the team hosted a watching party at Grover's Grill and Bar in Frisco, Texas, for the road game against San Diego. On December 29, January 4, and January 11, the team hosted watching parties for road games at The Allen Wickers Pub in Plano, Texas.

== Roster moves ==
In February 2013, the Sidekicks signed Dejan "Milo" Milosevic out of Texas Wesleyan University as a backup goalkeeper. Milo played in all 8 Sidekicks Premier games in June and July 2013, securing his spot on the squad for 2013–14 while the coaches evaluated other prospects. The team held tryouts and a training camp in mid-September 2013 where 60 players competed to fill out the 20 spots on the Sidekicks' extended roster.

On September 30, 2013, the Sidekicks announced the acquisition of forward Nestor Hernandez from the Chicago Mustangs for undisclosed terms. Hernandez was one of the league's leading scorers and named to the 1st Team All-PASL squad in 2012–13.

On October 23, 2013, the team announced that both Edilson "Sagu" Xavier and Dejan "Milo" Milosevic were re-signed as goalkeepers for the 2013–14 season. Sagu is slotted as the primary keeper with Milo as the backup. On October 25, the team re-signed defenders Kiley Couch, Nick Stavrou, and Sean Bellomy. On October 26, the team announced the signing of forward Bronil Koochoie.

Citing personal reasons, forward Bronil Koochoie sought and was granted release from the Sidekicks roster on December 19, 2013. Koochoie, who was a member of the Turlock Express last season, returned to California and signed with Bay Area Rosal. On January 16, 2013, he was released by Bay Area and re-signed with the Sidekicks.

== Awards and honors ==
On January 16, US Soccer named Tatu to the Veteran Player ballot for the National Soccer Hall of Fame in honor of his playing career in the original Major Indoor Soccer League. The Class of 2014 ballot is the first under new rules from the Hall of Fame that make original MISL players eligible for election. Ultimately, no Veteran Player received sufficient votes for induction.

On February 4, the Professional Arena Soccer League named goalkeeper Sagu as the PASL Player of the Week. The league cited his return from injury to help Dallas defeat the Las Vegas Legends, making "spectacular" saves in net while denying rebound opportunities to Las Vegas.

On February 26, 2014, the PASL announced its "All-League" honors. Midfielder Jamie Lovegrove was named to the All-League Second Team and midfielder Nestor Hernandez was named to the All-League Honorable Mention list.

== Schedule ==
Win Loss Bye

=== Regular season ===
Game	Day	Date	Kickoff	Opponent	Results		Location	Attendance
Game	Day	Date	Kickoff	Opponent	Score	Record	Location	Attendance
1	Saturday	November 2	7:00pm	Wichita B-52s	W 15–3	1–0	Allen Event Center	4,514
2	Saturday	November 9	9:05pm	at San Diego Sockers	W 5–3	2–0	Valley View Casino Center	5,658
3	Sunday	November 10	6:05pm	at Ontario Fury	L 5–6	2–1	Citizens Business Bank Arena	1,856
4	Saturday	November 16	7:00pm	Tulsa Revolution	W 7–5	3–1	Allen Event Center	3,392
5	Saturday	December 14	7:00pm	Saltillo Rancho Seco	W 7–3	4–1	Allen Event Center	4,140
6	Saturday	December 21	2:05pm	at Tulsa Revolution	W 8–6	5–1	Cox Business Center	783
7	Friday	December 27	7:35pm	Tulsa Revolution	W 13–8	6–1	Allen Event Center	4,322
8	Sunday	December 29	5:05pm	at Hidalgo La Fiera†	L 9–12	6–2	State Farm Arena	1,062
9	Thursday	January 2	7:35pm	Wichita B-52s	W 6–3	7–2	Allen Event Center	3,429
10	Saturday	January 4♥	7:05pm	at Wichita B-52s	W 6–0	8–2	Hartman Arena	1,255
11	Saturday	January 11	7:05pm	at Texas Strikers	W 15–1	9–2	Ford Arena	266
12	Saturday	January 18	6:05pm	at Tulsa Revolution	W 13–2	10–2	Cox Business Center	1,042
13	Saturday	January 25	7:00pm	Texas Strikers	W 15–3	11–2	Allen Event Center	4,238
14	Friday	January 31	7:35pm	Las Vegas Legends	W 8–6	12–2	Allen Event Center	3,780
15	Sunday	February 9	3:05pm	at Wichita B-52s	W 5–4 (OT)	13–2	Hartman Arena	2,025
16	Sunday	February 16	4:05pm	Harrisburg Heat	W 13–3	14–2	Allen Event Center	4,207

† Game also counts for US Open Cup, as listed in chart below.
♥ Postponed from December 7 due to extreme winter weather

=== Postseason ===
Round	Day	Date	Kickoff	Opponent	Results		Location	Attendance
Round	Day	Date	Kickoff	Opponent	Score	Record	Location	Attendance
Central Division Semifinal	Saturday	February 22	7:05pm	Monterrey Flash	L 4–6	0–1	Allen Event Center	4,849

=== U.S. Open Cup for Arena Soccer ===
Round	Day	Date	Kickoff	Opponent	Results		Location	Attendance
Round	Day	Date	Kickoff	Opponent	Score	Record	Location	Attendance
Round of 32	Sunday	November 17	3:00pm	Austin Capitals (PASL-Premier)	W 16–5	1–0	Allen Event Center	2,348
Round of 16	Sunday	December 29	5:05pm	at Hidalgo La Fiera	L 9–12	1–1	State Farm Arena	1,062

== Personnel ==
=== Player roster ===
As of December 19, 2013 Note: Flags indicate national team as defined under FIFA eligibility rules; some limited exceptions apply. Players may hold more than one non-FIFA nationality.

No.	Pos.	Nation	Player
0	GK	SRB	Dejan Milosevic
1	GK	BRA	Sagu
4	DF	USA	Kiley Couch
13	FW	BRA	Paulo da Silva
14	MF	BIH	Bruno Dumjovic
15	MF	USA	Cameron Brown
16	MF	USA	Sean Bellomy
17	FW	USA	Kristian Quintana
18	MF	ZAI	Patrick Shamu
23	MF	ENG	Nick Stavrou

No.	Pos.	Nation	Player
24	FW	USA	Shaun David
25	FW	MEX	Nestor Hernandez
28	FW	USA	Gabe Arredondo
30	FW	BRA	Renato Pereira
32	MF	ENG	Jamie Lovegrove
33	DF	USA	Cody Ellis
34	MF	CGO	Franck Mbemba
79	MF	BRA	Ricardinho
88	DF	BRA	Bruno Guarda
91	FW	ARG	Carlos Videla

Other players that logged time on the field for the Sidekicks this season include forward Mark Withers (#70), defender Beau Bellomy (#2), forward Dominic Schell (#21), and forward Bronil Koochoie (#7).

=== Staff ===
The ownership group during this season included majority owner Ronnie Davis as team president and CEO, plus vice president Missy Davis, and minority owners Tatu (who also serves as general manager and head coach), J.L. "Sonny" Williams, and Jim Tolbert. Assistant coaches under Tatu were Mike Powers and Caesar Cervin. The team's strength and performance coach was Kyle Meadows, the athletic trainer was Steve Parker, and Steve Wagner was the team chaplain. The team's public relations and communications director was Melissa Smith.

Ten of the Sidekicks' home games (eight regular season games plus the US Open Cup match and playoff game) were aired live on Time Warner Cable Sports Channel. The broadcast team included Norm Hitzges on play by play, former Sidekicks coach Gordon Jago with color commentary, and Alan Balthrop as broadcast statistician.
