= 2022–23 Major Arena Soccer League season =

Major Arena Soccer League
- Season: 2022–23
- Champions: Chihuahua Savage
- Matches: 168
- Goals: 1,928 (11.48 per match)
- Top goalscorer: Franck Tauou (38 goals)
- Biggest home win: Florida 14–1 Baltimore (April 8)
- Biggest away win: San Diego 11–3 Harrisburg (January 22)
- Longest losing run: Dallas Sidekicks (11 games)
- Average attendance: 2,172

The 2022–23 Major Arena Soccer League season was the fifteenth season for the league. The regular season started on November 25, 2022, and ended on April 2, 2023. Each team played a 24-game schedule. 45 anniversary of professional, indoor soccer in North America

== Changes from 2021–22 ==
=== Teams ===
==== Returning ====
- Mesquite Outlaws
- Monterrey Flash

==== Rebranding ====
- Ontario Fury to Empire Strykers

==== On hiatus ====
- Rochester Lancers

=== Change in season format ===
- On October 6, 2022, the MASL announced that teams will be divided into two conferences, Eastern and Western.
- On October 20, 2022, the MASL announced that the top five teams of each conference advance to the playoffs, with the fourth and fifth team of each conference playing a play-in game to advance to the quarterfinals. Similar to last season, the quarterfinals, semifinals, and finals rounds will be a 2 game home and home series; if tied after 2 games, a 15 minute overtime period then, if necessary, a golden goal overtime period will follow the end of regulation of Game 2.

== Standings ==
Advance to conference semifinals
Advance to conference quarterfinals
League champion

(Bold) Division Winner

=== Eastern Conference ===
| Pos | Team | Pld | W | OTW | OTL | L | GF | GA | GD | Pts |
|---|---|---|---|---|---|---|---|---|---|---|
| 1 | Milwaukee Wave | 24 | 14 | 1 | 1 | 8 | 154 | 145 | +9 | 45 |
| 2 | Baltimore Blast | 24 | 12 | 1 | 3 | 8 | 141 | 101 | +40 | 41 (Note: Baltimore wins tiebreaker over Florida based on total regulation and overtime wins.) |
| 3 | Florida Tropics SC | 24 | 12 | 0 | 5 | 7 | 141 | 134 | +7 | 41 |
| 4 | Utica City FC | 24 | 9 | 4 | 1 | 10 | 132 | 153 | −21 | 36 |
| 5 | Kansas City Comets | 24 | 9 | 2 | 4 | 9 | 136 | 129 | +7 | 35 |
| 6 | St. Louis Ambush | 24 | 5 | 4 | 2 | 13 | 115 | 132 | −17 | 25 |
| 7 | Harrisburg Heat | 24 | 2 | 4 | 1 | 17 | 89 | 161 | −72 | 15 |

Source: MASL

=== Western Conference ===
| Pos | Team | Pld | W | OTW | OTL | L | GF | GA | GD | Pts |
|---|---|---|---|---|---|---|---|---|---|---|
| 1 | San Diego Sockers (M) | 24 | 18 | 4 | 0 | 2 | 160 | 99 | +61 | 62 |
| 2 | Chihuahua Savage (C) | 24 | 14 | 3 | 1 | 6 | 179 | 124 | +55 | 49 |
| 3 | Monterrey Flash | 24 | 10 | 3 | 2 | 9 | 148 | 118 | +30 | 38 |
| 4 | Tacoma Stars | 24 | 11 | 1 | 2 | 10 | 155 | 139 | +16 | 37 (Note: Tacoma wins tiebreaker over Mesquite and Empire based on regulation wins.) |
| 5 | Mesquite Outlaws | 24 | 10 | 2 | 3 | 9 | 124 | 147 | −23 | 37 (Note: Tacoma wins tiebreaker over Mesquite and Empire based on regulation wins. Mesquite swept its head-to-head regular season series against Empire, winning, 4–3, on the road on December 16, and 7–2 at home on April 1.) |
| 6 | Empire Strykers | 24 | 10 | 2 | 3 | 9 | 138 | 132 | +6 | 37 |
| 7 | Dallas Sidekicks | 24 | 1 | 0 | 3 | 20 | 116 | 214 | −98 | 6 |

Source: MASL
(C) Champion; (M) MASL Shield winner

== 2023 Ron Newman Cup ==
Play-in
E4 | Utica City FC | 7*
E5 | Kansas City Comets | 6
W4 | Tacoma Stars | 6
W5 | Mesquite Outlaws | 9

Quarterfinals
E1 | Milwaukee Wave | 11 | 3 | 2
E4 | Utica City FC | 8 | 4 | 1
Eastern Conference
E2 | Baltimore Blast | 4 | 1 | 3
E3 | Florida Tropics SC | 3 | 14 | 2
W1 | San Diego Sockers | 7 | 8
W5 | Mesquite Outlaws | 1 | 0
Western Conference
W2 | Chihuahua Savage | 8 | 7 | 3
W3 | Monterrey Flash | 4 | 10 | 2

Semifinals
E1 | Milwaukee Wave | 4 | 3
E2 | Baltimore Blast | 5* | 5
W1 | San Diego Sockers | 5 | 6 | 0
W2 | Chihuahua Savage | 6 | 2 | 1*

Finals
E2 | Baltimore Blast | 6 | 6
W2 | Chihuahua Savage | 7* | 10
