= Dallas Sidekicks =

Dallas Sidekicks may refer to:

- Dallas Sidekicks (1984–2004), a defunct soccer team that played in the original Major Indoor Soccer League, Continental Indoor Soccer League, World Indoor Soccer League and second Major Indoor Soccer League
- Dallas Sidekicks (2012–present), a soccer team that plays in the Major Arena Soccer League
