= Chihuahua Savage =

Mexican indoor soccer team

- Full name: Chihuahua Savage Futbol Club
- Founded: 2019; 7 years ago
- Stadium: Arena Corner Sport
- Capacity: 2,500
- Owner: Joel Torres
- Head Coach: Jaime Borrego
- League: Major Arena Soccer League 2 (2026-27)
- 2024–25: 1st (Champions) (MASL1)
- Website: savage.com.mx
Home colours	Away colours

The Chihuahua Savage Futbol Club, also known as Savage CUU, are a Mexican professional indoor soccer team based in Chihuahua City, Chihuahua, that will compete in Major Arena Soccer League 2 starting in the 2026-27 season. Founded in 2019, the team made its debut in the Major Arena Soccer League 2 with the 2019–20 season, which was ended early due to the COVID-19 pandemic. Originally scheduled to return to the M2 for the 2021–22 season, the Savage were instead given membership to the MASL, replacing the Soles de Sonora. The club also had a women's side that played in the MASLW.

== Year-by-year ==
League champions	Runners-Up	Division champions	Playoff berth

Year	League	Record	GF	GA	Finish	Playoffs	Avg. Attend.
2019–20	M2	12–0	134	50	1st, M2	No playoffs	
2021	M2	Did not participate due to the COVID-19 pandemic					
2021–22	MASL	15-9	185	143	2nd, West	Lost Semifinals	1,000
2022-23	MASL	17-7	179	124	2nd, West	Champions	1,630

== Players ==
As of 5 April 2022

=== Active roster ===
Note: Flags indicate national team as defined under FIFA eligibility rules; some limited exceptions apply. Players may hold more than one non-FIFA nationality.

No.	Pos.	Nation	Player
0	GK	MEX	Berna Valdovinos
1	GK	MEX	Iván Muñoz
2	DF	MEX	Luis Medrano
3	DF	MEX	Raymundo Contreras
4	DF	MEX	Roberto Escalante
5	DF	MEX	Adrián Miller
6	MF	MEX	Jorge González
7	MF	MEX	Brayan Aguilar
8	MF	MEX	Erick Ponce
9	FW	MEX	Hugo Puentes
10	MF	MEX	Manuel Morales
11	MF	MEX	César Ruiz
12	DF	MEX	Arturo Valle
14	DF	MEX	Uriel Zuart
15	DF	MEX	Alan Durant

No.	Pos.	Nation	Player
16	MF	MEX	Jorge Ríos
19	FW	MEX	David González
20	FW	MEX	Edgar González
21	DF	MEX	Ricardo Macías
23	DF	MEX	Luis Quezada
24	MF	MEX	Brandon González
25	MF	MEX	Kevin Alvidrez
26	MF	MEX	Eduardo Garay
28	MF	MEX	Yair Magallanes
33	MF	MEX	Bryan Macías
76	MF	MEX	Alvaro Luevano
77	MF	MEX	Carlos Hernández
99	MF	MEX	Enrique Cañez
116	GK	MEX	Raúl Sarabia
