= 2012–13 Dallas Sidekicks season =

Dallas Sidekicks
2012–13 PASL season
- President/CEO: Ronnie Davis
- Head Coach/GM: Tatu
- Arena: Allen Event Center; 200 East Stacy Road; Allen, Texas 75002
- PASL: 1st, Central
- Ron Newman Cup Playoffs: Lost Division Finals vs. Rio Grande Valley Flash (0–2)
- Highest home attendance: 5,909 (November 3 vs. Harrisburg Heat)
- Lowest home attendance: 3,274 (February 28 vs. Rio Grande Valley Flash)
- Average home league attendance: 5,041 (regular season)

The 2012–13 Dallas Sidekicks season was the first season of the new Dallas Sidekicks professional indoor soccer club. The Sidekicks, a Central Division team in the Professional Arena Soccer League, played their home games in the Allen Event Center in Allen, Texas. The team was led by general manager and head coach Tatu with assistant coaches Mike Powers and Caesar Cervin.

== Season summary ==
The Sidekicks were successful in the regular season, earning a 13–3 record and clinching first place in the Central Division. The team qualified for the postseason and earned the right to play for the Ron Newman Cup in the PASL National Championship but lost consecutive games to the Rio Grande Valley Flash in the Division Finals, abruptly ending their playoff run. Dallas was the only one of the four regular season division leaders not to reach the PASL Semi-Finals in San Diego.

Undefeated at home during the regular season, the franchise was also successful at the box office, leading the league in home attendance for the regular season with an average of 5,041 fans per game. The Sidekicks did not participate in the 2012–13 United States Open Cup for Arena Soccer. After the season, the team formed a developmental squad called Sidekicks Premier which participated in the Summer 2013 PASL-Premier season.

== History ==
With some continuity in ownership, coaching, and players, the Sidekicks claimed the heritage of the original Dallas Sidekicks that won four championships in three leagues while playing at Reunion Arena in Dallas from 1984 to 2004.

The team's marketing slogan for the 2012–13 season was "We're Back!"

== Off-field moves ==
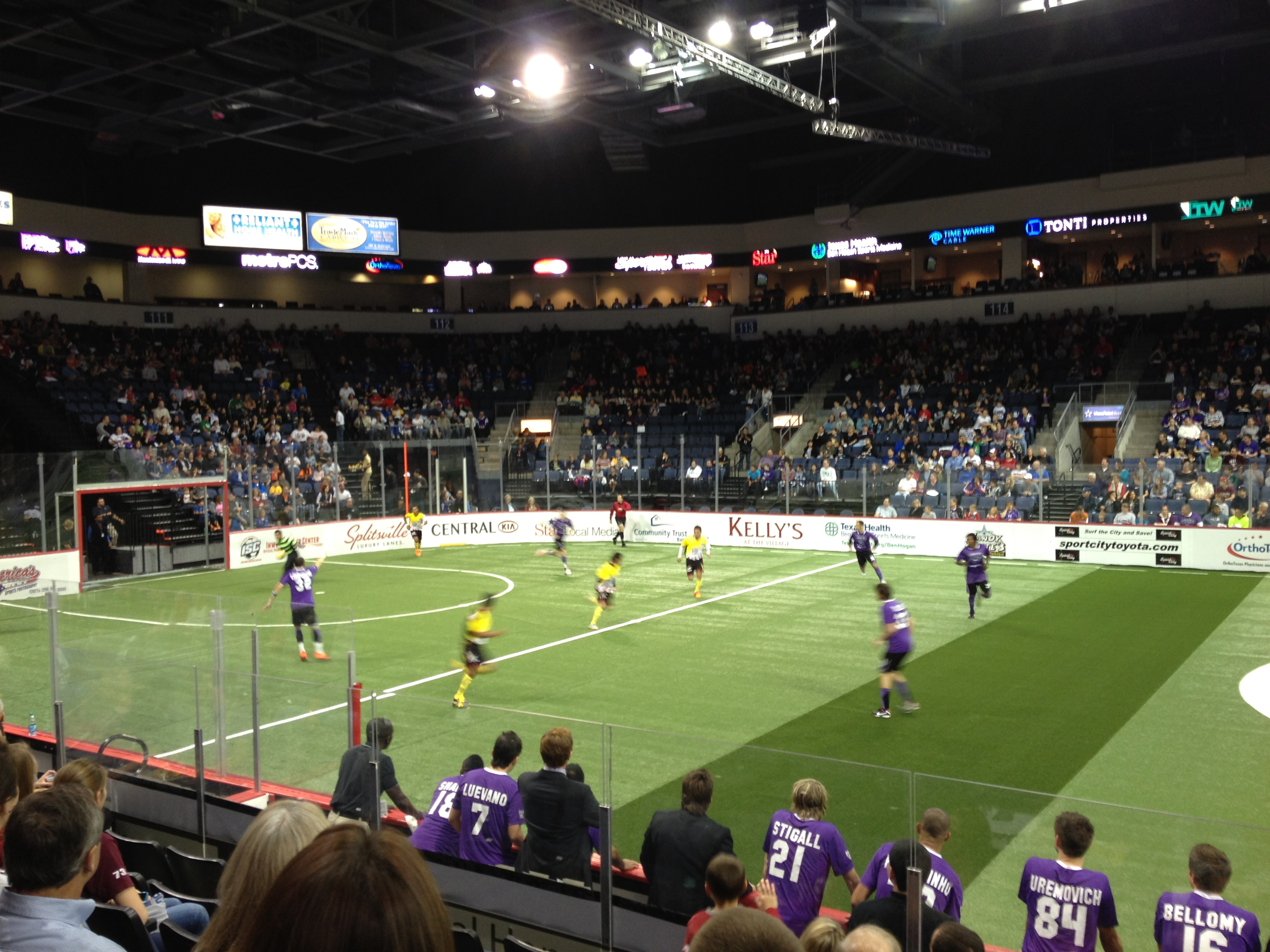
The Sidekicks hosting the Rio Grande Valley Flash on November 30, 2012.

Sidekicks home games during the 2012–13 season were televised by Time Warner Cable Sportschannel (formerly the Texas Channel) with Norm Hitzges on play-by-play and former Sidekicks coach Gordon Jago providing color commentary. Spanish language radio broadcasts of Sidekicks home games were carried by KTNO (1440 AM, "Radio Luz") licensed to the inner Dallas suburb of University Park, Texas.

Ceremonial kickoffs at home games were made by Iraq and Afghanistan war veterans, NFL Hall of Famer and Dallas Cowboys legend Tony Dorsett, soccer legend Gordon Jago, and the families of former players being honored by the franchise. In-game promotions included continuing the tradition of throwing an autographed #9 Tatu jersey into the stands after every Sidekicks goal, awarding fans a free milkshake from The Purple Cow when the Sidekicks scored 10 or more goals and won, and fan signs at each game with a slogan on the front plus games notes and a team roster on the back. The team also issued a set of trading cards featuring players and coaches, distributed two per home game during the regular season.

The January 27, 2013, match between Dallas and the San Diego Sockers renewed a rivalry that stretches back into the previous incarnations of both teams. In their first meeting as PASL teams, Dallas beat San Diego 6–5 in overtime, ending San Diego's record-setting winning streak. The streak began on December 29, 2010, and ended at 48 games.

The Sidekicks hosted a game-watching party for fans on February 1, 2013, at Dave & Buster's in Dallas. Injured forward Carlos Videla did not make the roadtrip to face the San Diego Sockers and served as host for the event.

== Roster moves ==
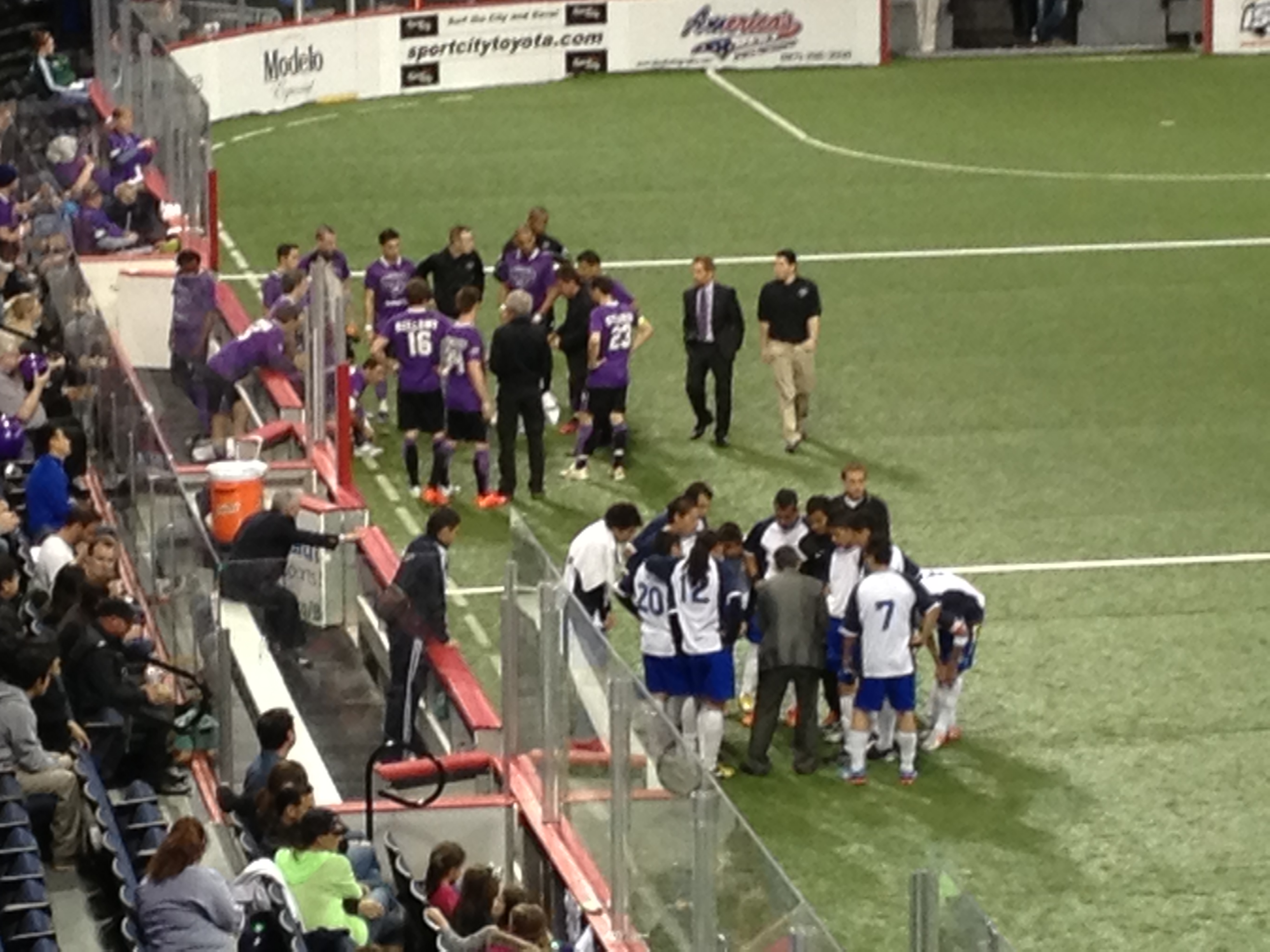
Both teams huddle during the February 28, 2013, playoff match between the Sidekicks and the Rio Grande Valley Flash.

The reborn Sidekicks held two open tryout sessions in late July 2012 at the Inwood Soccer Center in Addison, Texas. On July 31, 2012, the team signed veteran goalkeeper Edilson Xavier, better known as "Sagu", who had played for the original team from 1999 through 2004. Just before the team's first game, the roster included four former Sidekicks and four players from Southern Methodist University. In late December 2012, the team briefly added goalkeeper J.C. Cedillo of the Premier Arena Soccer League's Texas Xtreme to the roster.

On January 18, 2013, the Sidekicks announced the signings of forwards Mark Withers, Lucas Bassan, and Kristian Quintana, plus goalkeeper Dejan Milosevic. The team also announced the release of defender Jarod Stigall. In late January, the team added Bruno Guarda, formerly of FC Dallas, to the roster. In February 2013, the team added Dejan "Milo" Milosevic (formerly of Texas Wesleyan University) as a backup goalkeeper.

== Awards and honors ==
The Sidekicks set multiple all-time franchise records during the December 15, 2012, game against the Texas Strikers. Team records were set for most goals in a game (21), largest margin of victory (20), most hat tricks (4), and fastest powerplay goal (1 second). The records for goals in a half (11) and goals in a quarter (7) were tied, equaling marks set on July 11, 1993, against Monterrey La Raza.

At halftime of the December 15, 2012, game against the Texas Strikers, the Sidekicks retired the #11 jersey of David Doyle who played for the original Dallas Sidekicks from 1991 through 2004. During his Sidekicks career, Doyle was a five-time All-Star and MVP of the World Indoor Soccer League in 1999. At the time of the ceremony, Doyle worked as a coach at Flower Mound High School in Flower Mound, Texas.

On January 29, 2013, the Professional Arena Soccer League named forward Jamie Lovegrove as the PASL Player of the Week. The league cited the rookie's four goals in the Sidekicks' streak-ending defeat of the San Diego Sockers on January 27, 2013.

At halftime of the February 9, 2013, game against the Rockford Rampage, the Sidekicks retired the #9 jersey of Tatu who played for the original Dallas Sidekicks from 1984 through 2003. During his Sidekicks career, Tatu was a key member of all four championship teams. In 1998, Tatu became the team's head coach, a role he continued through the end of the original franchise and the inaugural season of the new franchise. Tatu was presented with a framed Dallas Sidekicks jersey as well autographed framed jerseys from Roger Staubach of the Dallas Cowboys, Dirk Nowitzki of the Dallas Mavericks, Mike Modano of the Dallas Stars, Nolan Ryan of the Texas Rangers, and a Brazil national football team jersey signed by Pelé.

Shawn Ray, a goalkeeper for the original Dallas Sidekicks and a key part of both the 1993 and 1998 league championships, died unexpectedly on February 18, 2013. The Sidekicks held a moment of silence before the game and wore black armbands during their regular season finale on February 23, 2013, in Ray's honor.

In postseason honors, goalkeeper Sagu was named to the 2012-13 PASL All-League First Team and defender Kiley Couch was named to the 2012-13 PASL All-League Second Team. Head coach Tatu was named 2012-13 PASL Coach of the Year.

In March 2013, former Sidekicks coach and current Sidekicks broadcaster Gordon Jago was one of six men named to the 2013 class of the Indoor Soccer Hall of Fame. The other inductees, all former players, are Preki, Kai Haaskivi, Zoltán Tóth, Brian Quinn, and Mike Stankovic.

== Schedule ==
Win Tie Loss

=== Regular season ===
Game	Day	Date	Kickoff	Opponent	Results		Location	Attendance
Game	Day	Date	Kickoff	Opponent	Final Score	Record	Location	Attendance
1	Saturday	November 3	7:00pm	Harrisburg Heat	W 6–2	1–0	Allen Event Center	5,909
2	Sunday	November 25	5:00pm	at Rio Grande Valley Flash	W 7–3	2–0	State Farm Arena	966
3	Friday	November 30	7:30pm	Rio Grande Valley Flash	W 7–3	3–0	Allen Event Center	5,606
4	Saturday	December 1	6:00pm	at Texas Strikers	W 10–3	4–0	Ford Arena	1,078
5	Saturday	December 15	7:00pm	Texas Strikers	W 21–1	5–0	Allen Event Center	4,768
6	Saturday	December 29	6:00pm	at Texas Strikers	W 16–4	6–0	Ford Arena	688
7	Thursday	January 3	7:30pm	Rio Grande Valley Flash	W 5–2	7–0	Allen Event Center	4,978
8	Saturday	January 5	6:00pm	at Rockford Rampage	W 11–4	8–0	Victory Sports Complex	283
9	Sunday	January 6	6:30pm	at Chicago Mustangs	L 7–8 (OT)	8–1	Grand Sports Arena	299
10	Saturday	January 12	7:00pm	Chicago Mustangs	W 6–2	9–1	Allen Event Center	4,015
11	Sunday	January 20	5:00pm	at Rio Grande Valley Flash	L 6–8	9–2	State Farm Arena	1,463
12	Sunday	January 27	6:00pm	San Diego Sockers	W 6–5 (OT)	10–2	Allen Event Center	4,701
13	Thursday	January 31	7:00pm (9:00pm Central)	at Las Vegas Legends	W 4–2	11–2	Orleans Arena	1,119
14	Friday	February 1	7:35pm (9:35pm Central)	at San Diego Sockers	L 4–5	11–3	Valley View Casino Center	4,474
15	Saturday	February 9	7:00pm	Rockford Rampage	W 14–5	12–3	Allen Event Center	5,499
16	Saturday	February 23	7:00pm	Texas Strikers	W 10–4	13–3	Allen Event Center	4,856

=== Postseason ===
Round	Day	Date	Kickoff	Opponent	Results		Location	Attendance
Round	Day	Date	Kickoff	Opponent	Final Score	Record	Location	Attendance
Division Finals Game 1	Sunday	February 24	3:05pm	at Rio Grande Valley Flash	L 4-5 (OT)	0-1	State Farm Arena	1,600
Division Finals Game 2	Thursday	February 28	7:30pm	Rio Grande Valley Flash	L 8–5	0–2	Allen Event Center	3,274

== Personnel ==
=== Player roster ===
As of February 21, 2013 Note: Flags indicate national team as defined under FIFA eligibility rules; some limited exceptions apply. Players may hold more than one non-FIFA nationality.

No.	Pos.	Nation	Player
0	GK	SRB	Dejan Milosevic
1	GK	BRA	Sagu
4	DF	USA	Kiley Couch
6	MF	GER	Thorsten Schmugge
7	MF	MEX	Robert Luevano
13	DF	SLV	Jose Castro
15	MF	USA	Chad Deering
16	MF	USA	Sean Bellomy
17	MF	USA	Kristian Quintana
18	FW	COD	Patrick Shamu
23	MF	ENG	Nick Stavrou
24	FW	USA	Sean David
26	GK	USA	Brock Duckworth

No.	Pos.	Nation	Player
27	FW	USA	Marcos Rodriguez
28	FW	BRA	Paolo da Silva
30	FW	BRA	Renato Pereira
32	MF	ENG	Jamie Lovegrove
33	DF	USA	Cody Ellis
34	MF	CGO	Franck Mbemba
42	FW	BRA	Lucas Bassan
70	FW	USA	Mark Withers
79	MF	BRA	Ricardinho
84	DF	USA	Michael Uremovich
88	DF	BRA	Bruno Guarda
91	FW	ARG	Carlos Videla

=== Staff ===
The ownership group during this inaugural season included majority owner Ronnie Davis as team president and CEO, plus minority owners Tatu (who also served as general manager and head coach), J.L. "Sonny" Williams, and Jim Tolbert. Assistant coaches under Tatu were Mike Powers and Caesar Cervin. The team's athletic trainer was Steve Parker and Steve Wagner was the team chaplain. The broadcast team included Norm Hitzges on play by play, Gordon Jago with color commentary, and Alan Balthrop as broadcast statistician.
