= Eduardo Cortes =

Mexican footballer (born 1993)

Personal information
- Date of birth: 31 August 1993 (age 33)
- Place of birth: Zapopan, Jalisco, Mexico
- Height: 1.78 m (5 ft 10 in)
- Position: Goalkeeper

Youth career
- 2009–2011: FC Dallas

College career
Years	Team	Apps	(Gls)
2012–2015	IUPUI Jaguars	61	(0)

Senior career*
Years	Team	Apps	(Gls)
2014	Indy Eleven NPSL		
2016	Saint Louis FC	0	(0)
2017	FC Dallas	0	(0)
2018	NTX Rayados		
2019	Fort Worth Vaqueros	5	(0)
2019	North Texas SC	1	(0)
2019–2020	Mesquite Outlaws (indoor)	20	(0)
2021	St. Louis Ambush (indoor)	1	(0)
2022	San Diego Sockers (indoor)	1	(0)
2022	St. Louis Ambush (indoor)	9	(0)
2022–2024	Texas Outlaws (indoor)	37	(0)
2024	St. Louis Ambush (indoor)	0	(0)
- * Club domestic league appearances and goals as of 17 December 2022

Eduardo "Pollo" Cortes (born 31 August 1993) is a Mexican footballer who currently plays as a goalkeeper for the St. Louis Ambush in the Major Arena Soccer League.

== Career ==
=== Youth and college ===
Cortes played with the FC Dallas academy for three seasons, before going to play college soccer at Indiana University – Purdue University Indianapolis in 2012. At IUPUI, Cortes made 61 appearances for the Jags.

While at college, Cortes appeared for National Premier Soccer League side Indy Eleven NPSL in 2014.

=== Professional ===
Cortes joined United Soccer League side Saint Louis FC in March 2016, where he stayed for the entire season, but was released without making an appearance for the club.

On 15 September 2017, Cortes joined MLS side FC Dallas as their third-choice goalkeeper.

Cortes played with amateur side NTX Rayados in 2018, and National Premier Soccer League side Fort Worth Vaqueros in 2019, before signing with USL League One's North Texas SC, an affiliate of FC Dallas.

Cortes was named to the Major Arena Soccer League's 2019–2020 All-Rookie Team for his performance with the Mesquite Outlaws.
