= Rio Ramirez =

American soccer/football player

J Rio Ramirez
Personal information
- Full name: J Rio Ramirez
- Date of birth: February 6, 1998 (age 28)
- Place of birth: Arlington, Texas, United States
- Height: 6 ft 0 in (1.83 m)
- Position: Right back

Team information
- Current team: Foro SC
- Number: 24

Youth career
- Dallas Texans
- Solar SC

Senior career*
Years	Team	Apps	(Gls)
2016-2017	SV Sillenbuch		
2017–2020	Fort Worth Vaqueros	32	(6)
2019–2020	Mesquite Outlaws (indoor)	21	(4)
2021	North Texas SC	16	(0)
2021–2022	Dallas Sidekicks (indoor)	12	(4)
2021	Tulsa Athletic	3	
2024	Frisco Fighters	1	
2023– present	Foro SC	78	(17)
2025	Tulsa Oilers	5	
- * Club domestic league appearances and goals as of March 20, 2025

J Rio Ramirez (born February 6, 1998) is a Professional American/Mexican soccer/football player who currently plays for United Premier Soccer League club Foro SC and club Tulsa Oilers Indoor Football League.

== Playing career ==
Ramirez played with NPSL side Fort Worth Vaqueros for three seasons with (6 goals), as well as a spell with Major Arena Soccer League side Mesquite Outlaws during the 2019–20 season having (4 goals). On April 22, 2021, Ramirez signed a one-year deal with USL League One side North Texas SC. He made his debut on May 2, 2021, appearing as an 88th-minute substitute during a 4–0 loss to Greenville Triumph. North Texas went on to lose in the quarterfinals, and he was not signed the following year.

On December 30, 2021, Ramirez signed with the Major Arena Soccer League's Dallas Sidekicks. Ramirez helped Dallas Sidekicks make playoffs since2018, Dallas Sidekicks were eliminated by Ontario Fury also in the quarterfinals. Ramirez competed in The Soccer Tournament 2023 with ZALA FFF, in The Soccer Tournament 2024 with Supra United FC, and The Soccer Tournament 2025 with Reunion City.

Ramirez joined United Premier Soccer League club Foro SC in 2023. 2025 Ramirez as a player/assistant coach helped defeat the new USL League One team, Texoma. Advancing on the next round losing to Tormenta FC.
