= 2013 Sidekicks Premier season =

Sidekicks Premier
2013 PASL-Premier summer season
- President/CEO: Ronnie Davis
- Head Coach/GM: Tatu
- Arena: Inwood Soccer Center; 14801 Inwood Road; Addison, Texas 75001
- PASL-Premier: South Central Division

The 2013 Sidekicks Premier season was the first season of the Premier Arena Soccer League affiliate of the Dallas Sidekicks professional indoor soccer club. The Dallas Sidekicks, a team in the Professional Arena Soccer League, launched Sidekicks Premier as a developmental affiliate to allow rookies and prospects to perform in a structured setting.

Sidekicks Premier, a South Central Division team, played their home games in the Inwood Soccer Center in Addison, Texas. The team was led by head coach Tatu with assistant coaches Mike Powers and Caesar Cervin. Team owner Ronnie Davis coached the team for one away game, the July 7th match against the Alamo City Warriors.

== Season summary ==
The team finished the 8-game regular season with a 7–1 record, placing second in the South Central Division, just behind Austin FC who finished with a 7–0–1 record. The team qualified for post-season play but elected not to travel to California for the league playoffs. A 2014 summer season was planned but cancelled after the team was unable to secure a suitable venue.

== Schedule ==
Win Tie Loss

=== Regular season ===
Game	Day	Date	Kickoff	Opponent	Results		Location
Game	Day	Date	Kickoff	Opponent	Final score	Record	Location
1	Sunday	June 2	2:00pm	Texas Xtreme	W 13–4	1–0	Inwood Soccer Center
2	Saturday	June 15	5:00pm	at Texas Xtreme	W 11–1	2–0	Blue Sky Euless
3	Sunday	June 23	2:00pm	Atletico Barcelona	W 6–4	3–0	Inwood Soccer Center
4	Saturday	June 29	7:00pm	at Austin FC	L 2–5	3–1	Soccer Zone Lakeline
5	Sunday	June 30	2:00pm	Strikers Premier	W 22–0	4–1	Inwood Soccer Center
6	Saturday	July 6	6:00pm	at Atletico Barcelona	W 11–4	5–1	Blue Sky The Colony 1
7	Sunday	July 7	3:00pm	at Alamo City Warriors	W 6–3	6–1	Aztec Indoor Soccer
8	Sunday	July 14	2:00pm	Alamo City Warriors	W 15–2	7–1	Inwood Soccer Center

== Player roster ==
As of July 14, 2013 Note: Flags indicate national team as defined under FIFA eligibility rules; some limited exceptions apply. Players may hold more than one non-FIFA nationality.

No.	Pos.	Nation	Player
0	GK	SRB	Dejan Milosevic
3	MF	USA	Beau Bellomy
7	MF	MEX	R. J. Luevano
14			Derek Cruz
16	MF	USA	Sean Bellomy
17	MF	USA	Kristian Quintana
20	FW	BRA	Lucas Bassan
21			Bruno

No.	Pos.	Nation	Player
26	MF	USA	Cedric Nickerson
27			Anthony Lewis
32	MF	ENG	Jamie Lovegrove
33	DF	USA	Cody Ellis
36	MF	USA	Chris Nieto
40	DF	USA	Jaime Benitez
89	MF	USA	Cameron Brown
—	GK		Alfredo Morales
