= 2021–22 Major Arena Soccer League season =

Major Arena Soccer League
- Season: 2021–22
- Champions: San Diego Sockers; 6th title
- Matches: 141
- Goals: 1,758 (12.47 per match)
- Top goalscorer: Ian Bennett (50)
- Biggest home win: Tacoma 9–21 Chihuahua (February 26)
- Biggest away win: San Diego 12–3 Tacoma (February 12)
- Longest winning run: 20 by San Diego (January 16–April 3)
- Longest losing run: 11 by Harrisburg (January 29–March 11)
- Highest attendance: 6,011 Tacoma – Kansas City (January 22)
- Lowest attendance: 522 Chihuahua – Ontario (March 8) and Tacoma – Ontario (March 21)
- Average attendance: 1,847
- All statistics correct as of April 13, 2022.

The 2021–22 Major Arena Soccer League season is the fourteenth season for the league. The regular season started on November 26, 2021, and ended on April 3, 2022. Each team was scheduled to play a 24-game schedule. However, two Baltimore Blast games in December were cancelled due to the COVID-19 pandemic, and a Florida Tropics SC game at the end of the season was cancelled due to a Southwest Airlines outage preventing the visiting Blast from arriving.

== Changes from 2021 ==
Promoted to MASL from M2

- Chihuahua Savage

Returning

- Baltimore Blast
- Harrisburg Heat
- Milwaukee Wave
- Utica City FC

Relegated to M2 from MASL

- Turlock Cal Express

On Hiatus

- Mesquite Outlaws
- Monterrey Flash
- Rochester Lancers

Folded

- Soles de Sonora

Change in season format

- On October 5, 2021, the MASL announced that teams will be divided into three divisions (Central, East, and West).
- On October 15, 2021, the MASL announced the following changes for the 2021–22 season:
  - Standings will be based on a points system similar to the EISL's variant of the three points for a win system, where a regulation win receives 3 points, a regulation loss receives no points, an overtime or shoot-out win receives 2 points, and an overtime or shoot-out loss receives 1 point.
  - Division champions and the top five teams remaining advance to the playoffs, with the division champions seeded on top of the 5 wild cards. Similar to last season, every playoff series will be a 2 game home and home series; if tied after 2 games, a 15 minute overtime period then, if necessary, a golden goal overtime period will follow the end of regulation of Game 2.

MASL Shield

The MASL Shield, awarded to the league's regular-season champion, was introduced this season.

== Standings ==
Playoff team
League champion

(Bold) Division Winner

=== Central Division ===
Pos	Team	Pld	W	OTW	OTL	L	GF	GA	GD	Pts
1	Kansas City Comets	23	13	0	1	9	153	131	+22	41 (Note: The December 19 game between Kansas City and Baltimore was cancelled due to COVID-19 protocols, resulting in a Did Not Play for both teams, each of which received one point.)
2	Dallas Sidekicks	24	10	1	1	12	128	165	−37	33
3	St. Louis Ambush	24	9	1	2	12	149	173	−24	31 (Note: St. Louis earned seven points in four head-to-head matches against Milwaukee, which earned five points. St. Louis won, 7–6, at home on December 19, and 7–5 at Milwaukee on March 20. Milwaukee won, 8–7 in overtime, at home on February 6, and 3–2 at St. Louis on March 18.)
4	Milwaukee Wave	23	9	1	1	12	146	162	−16	31 (Note: The December 18 game between Milwaukee and Baltimore was cancelled due to COVID-19 protocols, resulting in a Did Not Play for both teams, each of which received one point. St. Louis earned seven points in four head-to-head matches against Milwaukee, which earned five points. St. Louis won, 7–6, at home on December 19, and 7–5 at Milwaukee on March 20. Milwaukee won, 8–7 in overtime, at home on February 6, and 3–2 at St. Louis on March 18.)

Source: MASL

=== East Division ===
Pos	Team	Pld	W	OTW	OTL	L	GF	GA	GD	Pts
1	Florida Tropics SC	23	18	0	2	3	179	120	+59	56 (Note: The April 3 game between Florida and Baltimore was cancelled due to a series of cancellations of Baltimore's flights and a nationwide outage of the carrier. The game was not made up, because it did not affect playoff seedings. No points in the standings were awarded to the teams.)
2	Baltimore Blast	21	11	1	0	9	142	111	+31	37 (Note: The December 18 game between Baltimore and Milwaukee was cancelled due to COVID-19 protocols, resulting in a Did Not Play for both teams, each of which received one point. The December 19 game between Baltimore and Kansas City was cancelled due to COVID-19 protocols, resulting in a Did Not Play for both teams, each of which received one point. The April 3 game between Baltimore and Florida was cancelled due to a series of cancellations of Baltimore's flights and a nationwide outage of the carrier. The game was not made up, because it did not affect playoff seedings. No points in the standings were awarded to the teams.)
3	Utica City FC	24	8	2	0	14	119	153	−34	28
4	Harrisburg Heat	24	4	0	1	19	108	169	−61	13

Source: MASL

=== West Division ===
Pos	Team	Pld	W	OTW	OTL	L	GF	GA	GD	Pts
1	San Diego Sockers (C, M)	24	19	4	1	0	182	98	+84	66
2	Chihuahua Savage	24	12	3	2	7	185	143	+42	44
3	Ontario Fury	24	8	1	2	13	132	141	−9	28
4	Tacoma Stars	24	5	1	2	16	135	192	−57	19

Source: MASL
(C) Champion; (M) MASL Shield winner

== 2022 Ron Newman Cup ==
Quarterfinals
1	San Diego Sockers	9	9	–
8	Milwaukee Wave	2	3	–
4	Chihuahua Savage	4	4	5
5	Baltimore Blast	5	3	1
3	Kansas City Comets	7	5	3
6	Dallas Sidekicks	3	7	1
2	Florida Tropics SC	8	6	–
7	St. Louis Ambush	4	4	–

Semifinals
1	San Diego Sockers	6	6	4
4	Chihuahua Savage	7	2	1
3	Kansas City Comets	8	2	2
2	Florida Tropics SC	7	4	4

Finals
1	San Diego Sockers	6	4	–
2	Florida Tropics SC	3	3	–
