= 2024–25 Major Arena Soccer League season =

Major Arena Soccer League
- Season: 2024–25
- Champions: Chihuahua Savage
- Matches: 144
- Goals: 1,828 (12.69 per match)
- Top goalscorer: Jorge Rios, Chihuahua Savage (33 goals)
- Biggest home win: Tacoma 8-21 Chihuahua
- Biggest away win: Chihuahua 19-6 Utica
- Longest winning run: To be updated
- Longest losing run: To be updated
- Highest attendance: To be updated
- Lowest attendance: To be updated
- Average attendance: To be updated
- All statistics correct as of 11 January 2025.

The 2024–25 Major Arena Soccer League season is the seventeenth season of the league and the eleventh season as the Major Arena Soccer League. The regular season started on November 29, 2024 and ended on March 30, 2025. Each team will play 24 games for a total 144 games to be played.

== Changes from 2023–24 ==
With 12 teams playing in the 2024–25 season, the league eliminated conferences with the standings being unified for the league as a whole.

=== Teams ===
==== Returning ====
- Twelve of the 13 teams that competed in the previous season returned with Moneterrey going on hiatus.

==== Rebranding ====
- None

==== On hiatus ====
- Monterrey Flash

==== Folded ====
- The Florida Tropics SC, on hiatus the previous season, were removed from the league's list of teams on its website prior to the start of the season.

=== Change in season format ===
There were two conferences, Eastern and Western, until the previous season, but this season there is only one league.

- Rule change
- Playoff format

== Regular season ==
Playoff team
League champion

Pos	Team	Pld	W	OTW	OTL	L	GF	GA	GD	Pts
1	Chihuahua Savage (C, M)	24	18	2	0	4	218	114	+104	58
2	San Diego Sockers	24	16	4	0	4	152	119	+33	56
3	Baltimore Blast	24	15	1	1	7	167	123	+44	48
4	Kansas City Comets	24	14	1	2	7	137	124	+13	46
5	Milwaukee Wave	24	12	2	2	8	177	144	+33	42
6	Utica City FC	24	13	0	2	9	176	153	+23	41
7	Empire Strykers	24	11	1	2	10	165	145	+20	37
8	St. Louis Ambush	24	10	1	1	12	151	157	−6	33
9	Tacoma Stars	24	9	1	3	11	131	153	−22	32
10	Dallas Sidekicks	24	6	0	0	18	121	186	−65	18
11	Texas Outlaws	24	3	1	0	20	106	230	−124	11
12	Harrisburg Heat	24	3	0	1	20	127	180	−53	10

Source: MASL
(C) Champion; (M) MASL Shield winner

== 2025 Ron Newman Cup ==
Quarterfinals
1	Chihuahua Savage	5
8	St. Louis Ambush	1
4	Kansas City Comets	7
5	Milwaukee Wave	11
2	San Diego Sockers	4
7	Empire Strykers	2
3	Baltimore Blast	6
6	Utica City FC	2

Semifinals
1	Chihuahua Savage	7*
5	Milwaukee Wave	6
2	San Diego Sockers	11
3	Baltimore Blast	3

Finals
1	Chihuahua Savage	5	10	6
2	San Diego Sockers	7	6	0

* represent overtime periods

Note: The third game of the championship series was a 15-minute mini-game played immediately following the second game.
