= Texas Outlaws (MASL) =

- Founded: 2019; 7 years ago
- Dissolved: 2024; 2 years ago
- Ground: Mesquite Arena; Mesquite, Texas
- Capacity: 5,500
- Owner/President: Mehrdad Moayadi
- Head Coach: Ed Puskarich
- League: Major Arena Soccer League
- 2024–25: 9th. (no playoffs)
- Website: texasoutlaws.com
Home colors

The Texas Outlaws were an American professional indoor soccer team based in the Dallas–Fort Worth metroplex that competed in the Major Arena Soccer League (MASL). Founded in 2019, the team made its debut in the MASL with the 2019–20 season. Their first season was ended early due to Coronavirus disease of 2019. The Outlaws were owned by Mehrdad Moayadi, a real-estate developer in the Dallas–Fort Worth metroplex. The team was located just 32 miles from crosstown rival the Dallas Sidekicks. They were coached by Tatu who spent much of his career playing for the Sidekicks. Many of the players on the team were added from local tryouts that were held in Addison, Texas. On June, 14, 2024, Texas Outlaws goalkeeper Eduardo "Pollo" Cortes announced on Instagram that due to an undisclosed violation of league policy, all players contracts to the team would be void; effectively ending the team.

== Year-by-year ==
League champions	Runners-up	Division champions*	Playoff berth

Year	League	Record	GF	GA	Finish	Playoffs	Avg. attendance
2019-2020	MASL	7-14	109	123	Season suspended due to COVID-19, 7th, Western Conference	No playoffs (COVID-19)	2,742
2020-21 & 2021-22	MASL	On Hiatus					
2022-23	MASL	12-12	124	147	5th, Western Conference	Lost conference semifinals	1,170
2023-24	MASL	11-13	159	161	4th, Western Conference	Lost Conference Semifinal	1,149

== Roster ==
- As of 22 May 2019

Note: Flags indicate national team as defined under FIFA eligibility rules; some limited exceptions apply. Players may hold more than one non-FIFA nationality.

No.	Pos.	Nation	Player
00	GK	USA	Estevan Vasquez
0	GK	USA	Eduardo Cortes
1	GK	BRA	Edilson Xavier
2	DF	USA	Rio Ramirez
4	DF	USA	Clark Binning
5	DF	BRA	Leandro Alves Duarte
6	DF	MEX	Mitchell Cardenas
8	FW	USA	Bradlee Baladez
9	MF	USA	Brenden Lee
10	FW	HON	Ramón Núñez
11	FW	USA	Anthony Powell
12	MF	USA	Jorge Deleon
13	FW	USA	Bobby Edet

No.	Pos.	Nation	Player
14	MF		Luis Saúl Ramírez
15	MF	MEX	Omar Tapia
17	FW	USA	Angel Rodriguez
18	MF	USA	Oscr Romero
19	MF	USA	Richard Orozco
20	FW	USA	VcMor Eligwe
23	DF	USA	Mike Jones
24	FW	USA	Shaun David
32	MF	ENG	Jamie Lovegrove
33	DF	USA	Cody Ellis
77	DF	NGA	Josemaria Oteze
94	FW	USA	Macain Spragling
