= 2019–20 Major Arena Soccer League 2 season =

Major Arena Soccer League 2
- Season: 2020-21

The 2019–20 Major Arena Soccer League 2 season was the third season for the league also known as M2. The regular season started on December 1, 2019, and ended on March 13, 2020, due to the COVID-19 pandemic.

The Major Arena Soccer League signed an agreement with Arena Soccer Group, LLC (ASG) to take over the management of M2 on October 24, 2019. ASG brought over FC Amarillo Bombers and Wichita Falls Flyers FC from its former league, the US Arena Professional Soccer League, to join M2.

== Changes from 2018–19 ==
Expansion

- FC Amarillo Bombers
- Austin Power FC
- Chihuahua Savage
- Wichita Wings
- Wichita Falls Flyers FC

Provisional Schedule

- Muskegon Risers

On hiatus

- Las Vegas Knights

Folded / left

- Arizona Lightning
- Chicago Mustangs
- Cincinnati Swerve
- Cuervos de Juarez
- New Mexico Elite
- Ontario Fury II
- Rochester Lancers
- San Diego Sockers 2
- Stockton Rush
- Waza Flo

== Standings ==
As of March 13, 2020
2019-20 League Championship
2019-20 Playoff Team
(Bold) Division Winner

Place	Team	GP	W	L	Pct	GF	GA	GB
Mountain Division
1	Chihuahua Savage	12	12	0	1.000	134	50	0
2	Wichita Wings	13	10	3	.808	132	64	2.5
3	FC Amarillo Bombers	12	7	5	.583	92	92	5
4	Colorado Inferno F.C.	13	7	6	.577	130	111	5.5
5	Austin Power FC	14	6	8	.429	103	142	7
6	New Mexico Runners	11	4	7	.364	85	102	7.5
7	Wichita Falls Flyers	12	3	9	.292	84	116	9
8	Colorado Rumble	11	0	11	.045	50	133	11.5
Provisional Teams
*	Muskegon Risers	4	3	1	.750	63	28	
