= Mike Jones (soccer) =

American soccer player

Personal information
- Full name: Mychel Jones
- Date of birth: August 19, 1988 (age 38)
- Place of birth: St. Peters, Missouri, United States
- Height: 6 ft 4 in (1.93 m)
- Position: Defender

Youth career
- –2005: Ft. Zumwalt South HS Bulldogs

College career
Years	Team	Apps	(Gls)
2006–2010	SIU Edwardsville Cougars	60	(6)

Senior career*
Years	Team	Apps	(Gls)
2011	Sporting Kansas City	0	(0)
2011	New York Red Bulls	1	(0)
2012–2013	Hjørring	67	(0)
2014–2019	Dallas Sidekicks (indoor)	62	(10)
2017–2018	Fort Worth Vaqueros	14	(0)
2019–	NTX Rayados		
2019–2020	Mesquite Outlaws (indoor)	19	(1)
2021–2022	Dallas Sidekicks (indoor)	34	(4)
2022–2023	Florida Tropics (indoor)	0	(0)
- * Club domestic league appearances and goals as of 27 November 2024

Mychel Jones (born August 19, 1988) is an American soccer player who currently plays for Florida Tropics SC in the Major Arena Soccer League, as well as for amateur side NTX Rayados.

== Career ==
=== College and amateur ===
Jones attended Southern Illinois University Edwardsville and appeared in 60 games for the Cougars, recording six goals and two assists from the backline. As a senior centerback in 2010, Jones helped lead SIUE to seven shutouts in 19 games and was chosen Second Team All-Missouri Valley Conference.

=== Professional ===
On January 18, 2011, Jones was drafted in the second round (#28 overall) in the 2011 MLS Supplemental Draft by Sporting Kansas City. He was waived by the team on May 5. He did not make any MLS appearances for Kansas City, but played in one reserve league match. On June 18, the New York Red Bulls announced that Jones had signed with the team. On June 28, 2011, Jones started his first match for New York playing the full 90 in a 2–1 victory over FC New York in the US Open Cup. During the 2011 Emirates Cup, Jones was included in the New York squad but did not play in either games against Paris Saint-Germain and Arsenal.

Jones was waived by New York on November 23, 2011. He was signed by FC Hjørring of the Danish 1st Division on July 8, 2012.

On September 23, 2019, Jones was announced as one of the first five signees for Major Arena Soccer League expansion club Mesquite Outlaws.

Jones joined Florida Tropics SC on December 28, 2022, in a trade that saw VcMor Eligwe move to Dallas.
