= Nick Stavrou =

English footballer and coach

Personal information
- Full name: Nicholas Stavrou
- Date of birth: 26 August 1969 (age 57)
- Place of birth: Worthing, England
- Position: Midfielder

College career
Years	Team	Apps	(Gls)
1987–1990	Cleveland State Vikings		

Senior career*
Years	Team	Apps	(Gls)
1991–2004	Dallas Sidekicks (Indoor)	292	(199)
2012–2015	Dallas Sidekicks (Indoor)	33	(10)

Managerial career
- 2004–2006: Prestonwood Christian Lions
- 2006–2010: Texas Woman's Pioneers (assistant)
- 2017–: Fort Worth Vaqueros
- 2019–: Mesquite Outlaws (assistant)
- * Club domestic league appearances and goals

Nicholas Stavrou (born 26 August 1969) is an English football midfielder and coach, who played thirteen years of professional indoor soccer with the Dallas Sidekicks. He currently serves as head coach of Fort Worth Vaqueros FC in the National Premier Soccer League and as the assistant coach for the Mesquite Outlaws of the Major Arena Soccer League.

== Player ==
=== College ===
A standout midfielder at Cleveland State University, Stavrou was a 1990 Second Team All-America. A two-time MVP of the Mid-Continent Conference, Stavrou was honored as a defender in 1989 and a midfielder in 1990. The all-time leader in games played at Cleveland State (82), he also ranks fourth among the school's all-time points leaders (112), fourth in goals (46), and tied for ninth in assists (20). In 2002, he was inducted into the school's Athletic Hall of Fame.

=== Professional ===
After a stellar college career, Stavrou was selected by the Dallas Sidekicks in the second round of the 1991 Major Indoor Soccer League, (MISL) draft. He played 10 seasons with the team, which played in the MISL, World Indoor Soccer League, Continental Indoor Soccer League (CISL) in 1993, and the Premiere Soccer Alliance (PSA) in 1998. A member of the Dallas Sidekicks MISL championship teams in 1993, 1998 and 2001, he earned second team All-PSA honors in 1998 and second team All-WISL honors in 2000. Stavrou scored 199 goals in 292 games with the Sidekicks from 1991 to 2004. In November 2012, he began playing for the new Dallas Sidekicks of the Professional Arena Soccer League.Stavrou retired as a player on July 1, 2014. He was named Director of Soccer Operations for the Dallas Sidekicks on the same date. These decisions were announced via a detailed press release on August 11, 2014. He scored his 1st MISL professional goal on November 4, 1989 against St. Louis. He is one of a select group of 8 players too have won 2 professional championships with the sidekicks.

== Coach ==
After his playing career ended, he was a women's soccer assistant coach at Texas Woman's University (TWU) in Denton, Texas, and for youth teams around Dallas.

On 22 July 2019, Stavrou was named to the first-ever coaching staff for the Major Arena Soccer League's Mesquite Outlaws. Stavrou will be working alongside two other former Dallas Sidekicks players, with Tatu as head coach and Sagu as goalkeepers coach.
