= Norm Hitzges =

American sports writer and broadcaster (born 1944)

- Born: Norman Richard Hitzges; July 5, 1944 (age 82); Dunkirk, New York
- Spouses: Mary Hitzges (née Danz) (m. 2011) Vicki Hitzges (née Robinson) (m. 1983)
- Children: Two stepsons
- Presenting career
- Show: Just Wondering... with Norm Hitzges
- Station: Fan Stream Sports
- Network: FanStreamSports.com
- Time slot: Daily (M-F)
- Style: Sports Talk, Humor
- Country: United States
- Previous shows: The Norm Hitzges Show (KTCK 1310 AM) and The Norm and D Invasion (KLIF)
- Website: stolenwatermedia.com/shows/just-wondering-with-norm-hitzges/

Norm Hitzges (born July 5, 1944) is an American author and sports talk radio host. He is a member of the Texas Radio Hall of Fame.

== Career ==
Hitzges hosts at KTCK (1310 AM / 96.7 FM, "SportsRadio 1310 The Ticket") in Dallas. Hitzges pioneered radio sports talk in the morning at KLIF radio at a time when sports talk was mainly on in the evening. Hitzges moved to (former rival) KTCK in early 2000 after 15 years at sister station KLIF when the latter removed sports talk programming from its lineup. Hitzges also serves as the television play-by-play voice of the Dallas Sidekicks.

Hitzges spent several years as a color commentator for Texas Rangers broadcasts on HSE and also provided major league baseball commentary for ESPN. Hitzges is known for his enthusiasm and knowledge of sports trivia and has been compared to Dick Vitale for his energy and love of sports. Hitzges has been honored by the Dallas All Sports Association and the Texas Baseball Hall of Fame.

Hitzges also hosts "Norm-A-Thon", a yearly 18-hour marathon broadcast to raise money for the Austin Street Center, a Dallas area homeless shelter. Hitzges has also been a long-time supporter of Texans! Can Academy, an organization that provides at-risk youths with education and training.

Weekly segments on his show include “The Birdhouse,” “Shuttle Run,” “The Meatheads of the Week,” and “The Weekend-around.”

On August 7, 2020, Hitzges celebrated his 45th anniversary of sports talk radio. During a call-in, Mark Cuban related that Norm's KLIF show was the first radio program streamed on the internet on his original radio simulcast platform, AudioNet (later Broadcast.com). This required recording the show on an 8-hour VCR tape and then encoding the tapes onto a Packard-Bell PC to upload to the internet.

On June 15, 2023, Hitzges announced that he would be retiring from radio after 48 years on-air in Dallas. His last broadcast was Friday, June 23, 2023.

In September 2023, Hitzges launched his podcast, "Just Wondering... With Norm Hitzges". Hitzges posts daily episodes Monday through Friday, discussing sports and non-sports-related topics. The show launched on FanStreamSports.com, based in the DFW area where Hitzges resides with wife, Mary.

== Personal life ==
Since 2010, Hitzges and his wife have lived in the Dallas suburb of Little Elm, Texas. On August 27, 2020, Hitzges announced on the air that he is being treated for bladder cancer. Notable DFW media members were quick to show their support, including Fox 4's Mike Doocy.

== Partial bibliography ==
- Horizons in the Mirror (1971, Naylor Co., ISBN 978-0-8111-0410-4)
- Norm Hitzges Historical Sports Almanac (May 1991, Taylor Publishing, ISBN 978-0-87833-621-0)
- Essential Baseball: A Revolutionary New Method for Evaluating Major League Teams, Players, and Managers (with Dave Lawson, December 1994, Dutton, ISBN 978-0-452-27184-5)
- Greatest Team Ever: The Dallas Cowboys Dynasty of The 1990s (August 2007, Thomas Nelson, ISBN 978-1-4016-0340-3)
