= Credit Union of Texas Event Center =

Indoor arena in Allen, Texas, US

Credit Union of Texas Event Center (CUTXEC)

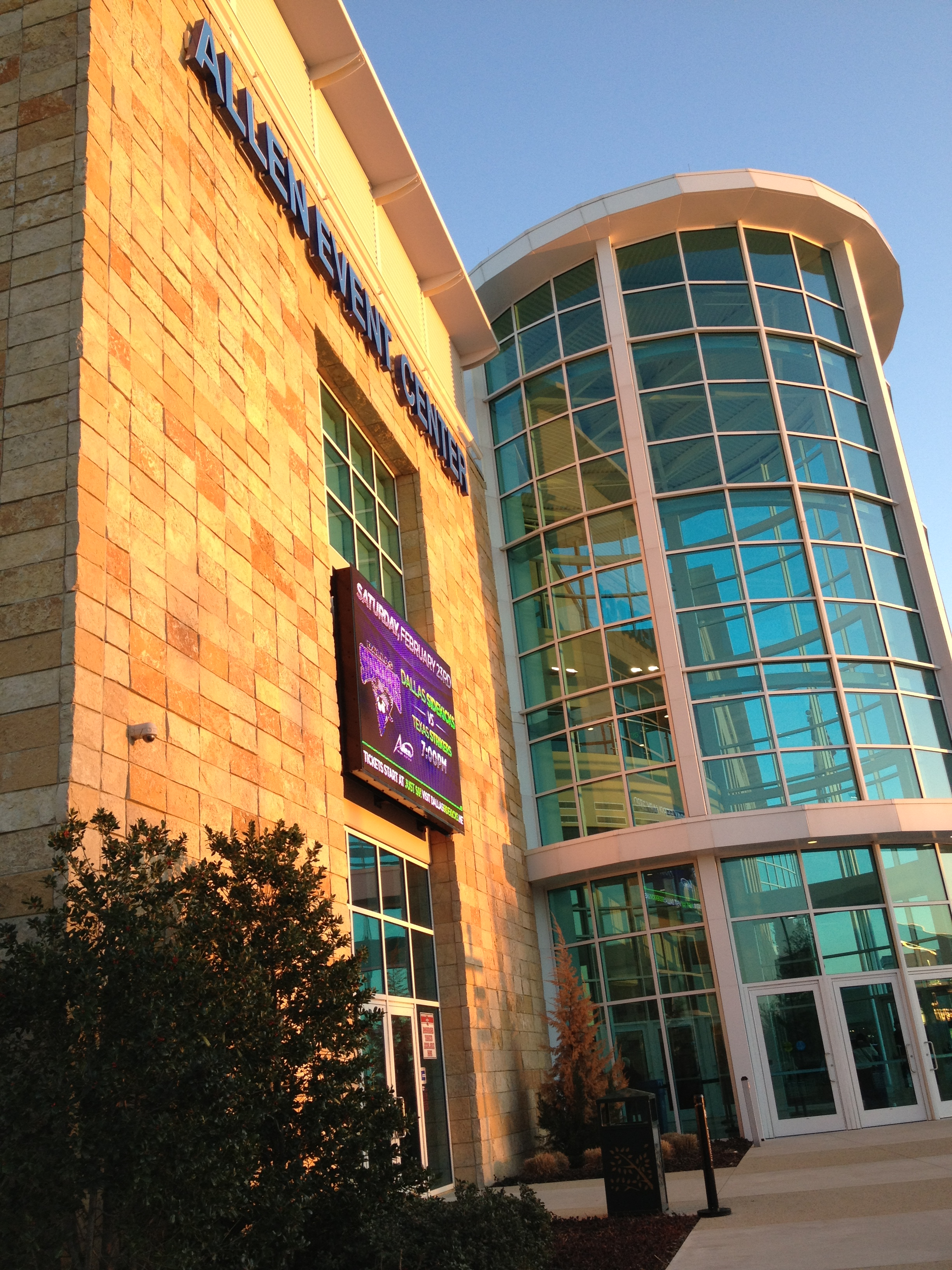
- The Allen Event Center on February 23, 2013, as it hosted a Professional Arena Soccer League match between the Dallas Sidekicks and the Texas Strikers.

- Location within Texas Location within the United States
- Location: 200 East Stacy Road; Allen, Texas 75002
- Coordinates: 33°07′38″N 96°39′27″W
- Owner: City of Allen
- Operator: City of Allen
- Capacity: Ice hockey: 6,275; Indoor soccer: 6,006; Up to 8,600 seats for concerts and special events

Construction
- Groundbreaking: July 24, 2008
- Opened: November 7, 2009
- Cost: $52.6 million ($78.9 million in 2025 dollars)
- Architect: Sink Combs Dethlefs
- Project manager: International Coliseums Company
- Structural engineers: Martin/Martin, Inc.
- Services engineers: M-E Engineers, Inc.
- General contractor: Hunt Construction Group

Tenants
- Allen Americans (ECHL) (2009–present); Dallas Sidekicks (PASL/MASL) (2012–2025); Texas Revolution (IFL/CIF) (2013–2017); Allen Eagles (AT&T MHSHL) (2009–present)

Website
- cutxeventcenter.com

The Credit Union of Texas Event Center (formerly Allen Event Center) is an American 6,275 fixed-seat multi-purpose indoor arena located in Allen, Texas, a northern suburb of Dallas. The arena opened in 2009 under the name Allen Event Center. Construction cost was $52.6 million ($63.5 million in 2020 dollars). The City of Allen sold the naming rights to the arena to the Credit Union of Texas in 2021 for a seven-year term at $325,000 per year.

== History ==
On June 27, 2007, the Allen City Council approved a new indoor arena to be built in the city. The arena would cost $50 million with the intent of hosting an ice hockey team in the future. The arena broke ground on July 24, 2008.

The arena opened along with the entire "Village at Allen" power center on November 6, 2009. Reba McEntire played a concert that night to open the arena. Other events, including monster truck racing, appeared over the course of 2010.

== Tenants and events ==
=== Sports ===
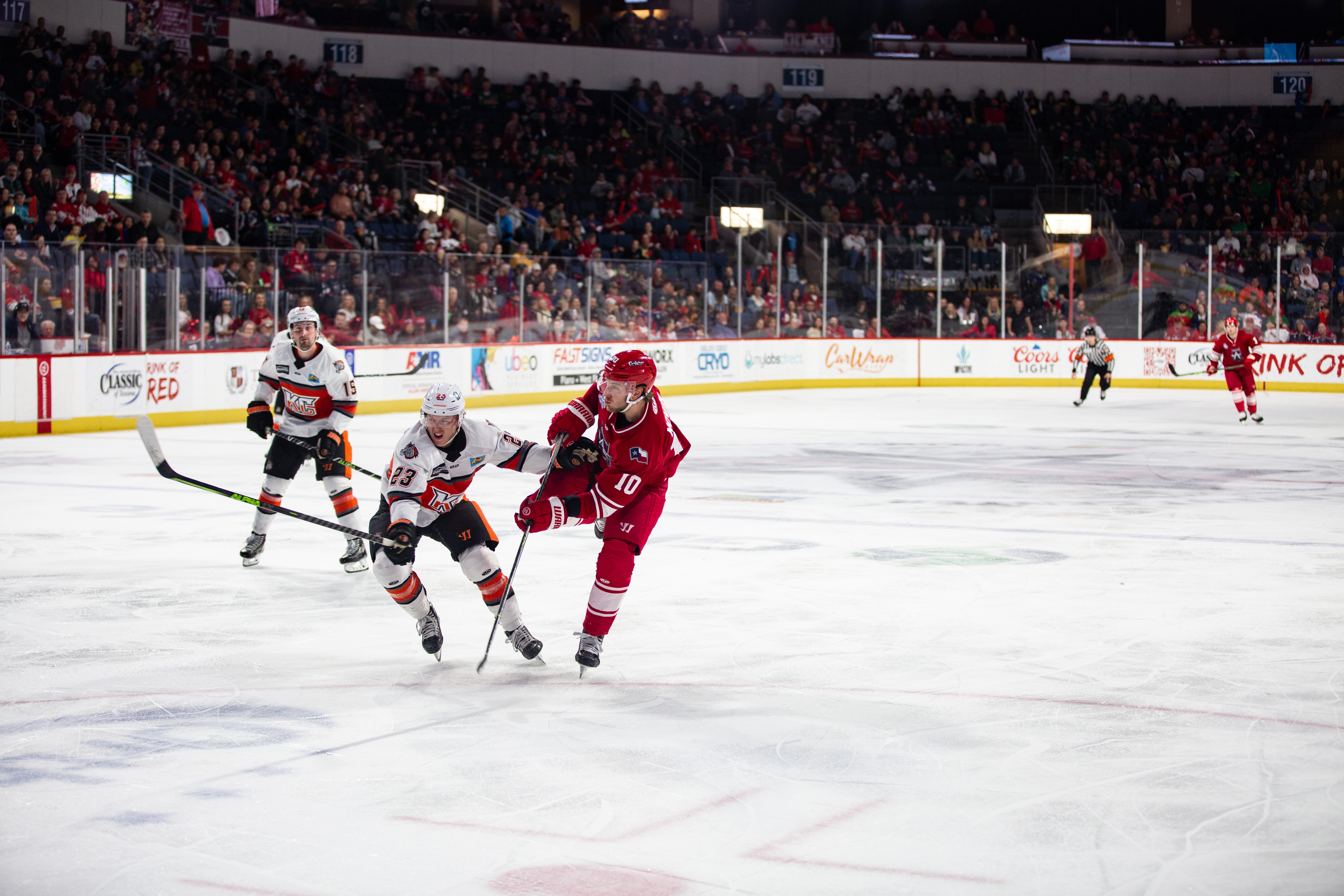
The Allen Americans vs the Kansas City Mavericks at the Credit Union of Texas Event Center during the 2023 Kelly Cup Playoffs

The center hosts the home games of the ECHL's Allen Americans. The Miss Texas pageant relocated to the center for 2012 and 2013. It was formerly the home of Champions Indoor Football's Texas Revolution (also previously called the Allen Wranglers) until the team moved to Frisco, Texas, in 2017, and The Dallas Sidekicks indoor soccer team until 2025 when the team went dormant.

In 2019, the event center hosted the NCWA National Wrestling Championship.

From 2027 through at least 2029, it will host the men's and women's basketball tournaments for the NCAA Division I United Athletic Conference.

=== Esports ===
The arena has also become a prominent esports venue. On April 27 and 29, 2019, the Dallas Fuel hosted the Overwatch League's first Homestand Weekend at the Allen Event Center. These matches were the first in league history to be played away from the Blizzard Arena in Burbank, California.

In the Call of Duty League (CDL), the arena is the de facto home of esports club OpTic Texas, which hosted the 2024 Call of Duty League Championship, where OpTic won the season championship, and Major 2 of the 2025 Call of Duty League season.

In League of Legends, the venue hosted the championship for the first and only season of the League of Legends Championship of The Americas (LTA). The following year, it will host the swiss stage, quarterfinals and semifinals of the 2026 League of Legends World Championship.
