= Dallas Sidekicks (2012–present) =

American professional indoor soccer team based in Allen, Texas

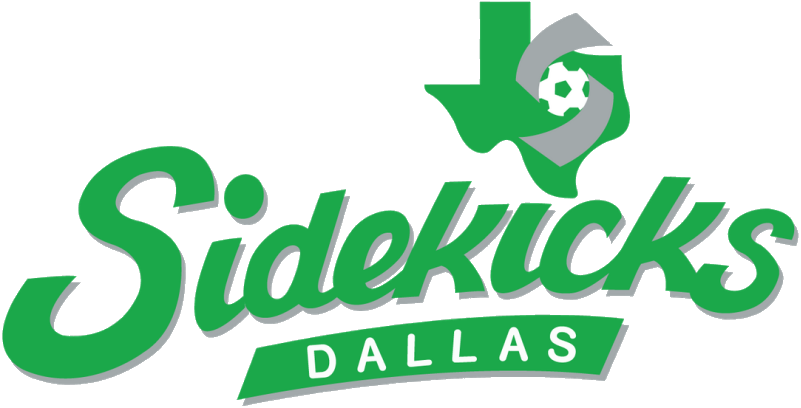
- Full name: Dallas Sidekicks
- Founded: May 1, 2012; 14 years ago
- Dissolved: 2024; 2 years ago
- Stadium: Credit Union of Texas Event Center; Allen, Texas
- Capacity: 6,006
- Owner: Sidekicks Sports Management, LLC
- Head Coach: Terry Woodberry
- League: Major Arena Soccer League
- 2024-25: 10th. (no playoffs)
Home colors	Away colors

The Dallas Sidekicks were an American professional indoor soccer team based in the Dallas–Fort Worth metroplex that competed in the Major Arena Soccer League (MASL). The team played its home games in the Credit Union of Texas Event Center. They kicked off their inaugural season as a member of the Professional Arena Soccer League on November 3, 2012. The Sidekicks segued to the MASL for its inaugural season on October 25, 2014.

The team took a leave of absence on September 19, 2017, for one season to re-organize. On July 24, 2018, it was announced that the Dallas Sidekicks would return for the 2018–2019 season.

In September 2025, the MASL announced that the Sidekicks would not take part of the 2025-26 season.

== History ==
The team was named after the original Dallas Sidekicks that operated from 1984 to 2004. This new team came into existence after the Allen City Council approved a lease for the Allen Event Center for Dallas Sidekicks, LLC, in April 2012. Owner Ronnie Davis was awarded a franchise in the Professional Arena Soccer League (PASL) on May 1, 2012. In July 2012, the team held open tryouts for prospective players at the Inwood Soccer Center in Addison, Texas.

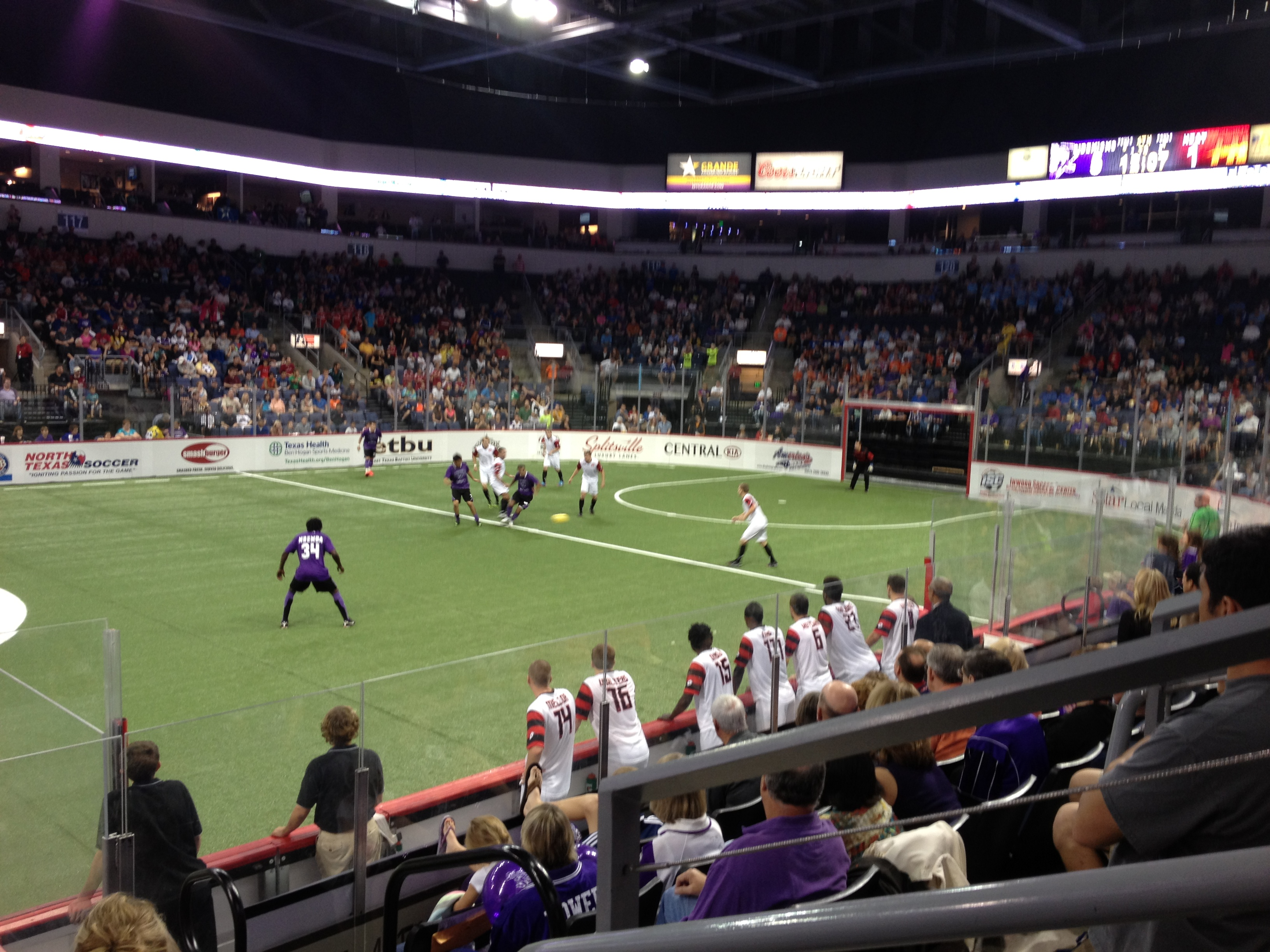
Harrisburg Heat at Dallas Sidekicks in November 2012

The Sidekicks returned to the field in November 2012 as a member of the Central Division of the PASL, playing their home games in the Allen Event Center in Allen, Texas, led by general manager and head coach Tatu with assistant coaches Mike Powers and Caesar Cervin. With Tatu coaching and several veteran players from the original Sidekicks on the roster, the team's marketing slogan for the season was "We're Back!" The new team honored veteran players by retiring the #11 jersey of David Doyle and #9 jersey of Tatu.

The Sidekicks defeated the Harrisburg Heat 6–2 in their PASL debut, before a PASL single-game attendance record of 5,909. The team split their regular season matches against historic rival San Diego Sockers, ending San Diego's record-setting winning streak. Dallas found their success on the field in the regular season, amassing a Central Division leading 13–3 record and qualifying for the postseason, but lost the Division Finals to the Rio Grande Valley Flash. The franchise lead the league in regular season home attendance with an average of 5,041 fans per game.

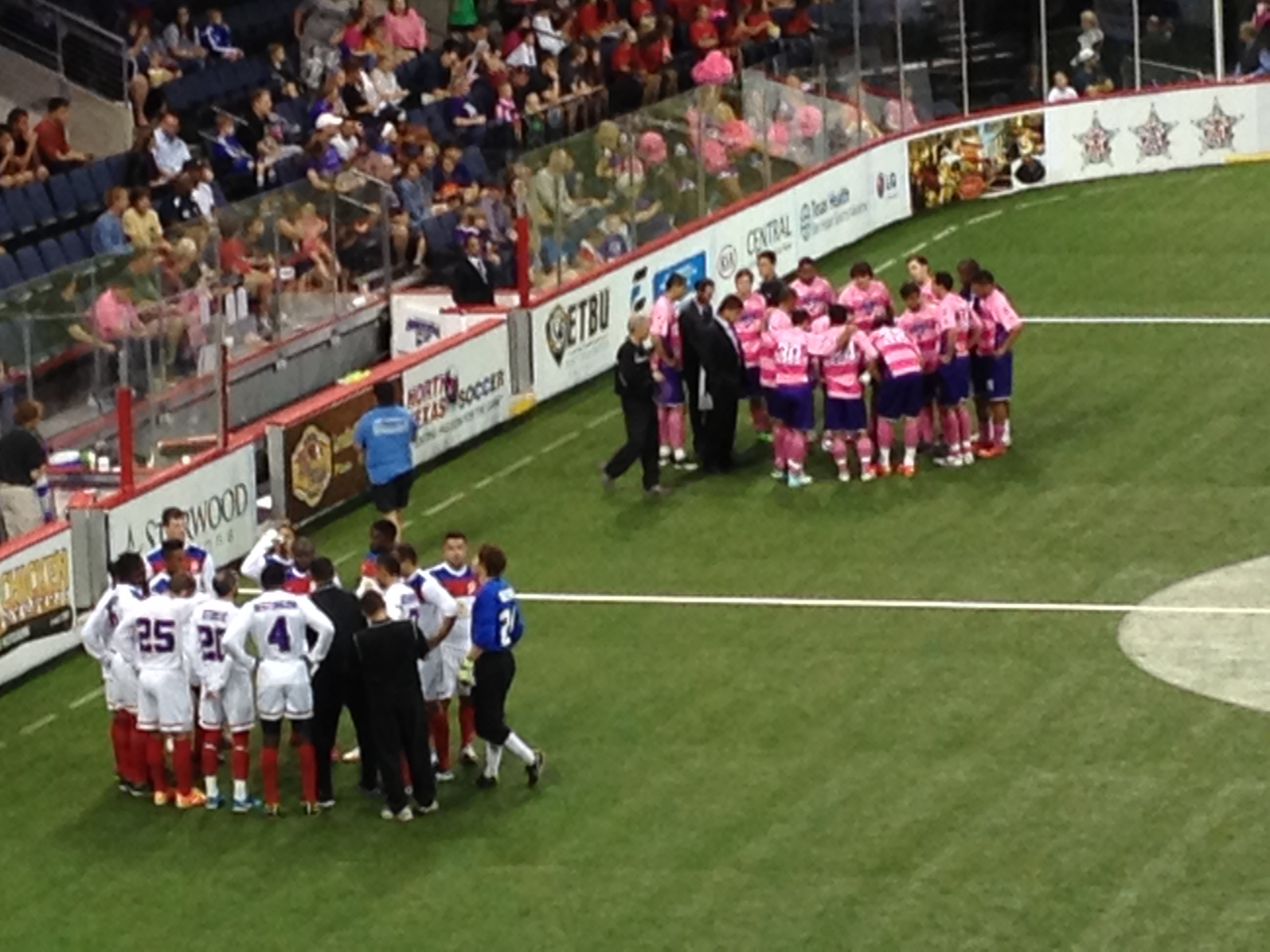
Dallas Sidekicks vs Missouri Comets in 2014

The Sidekicks returned to the Allen Event Center for the 2013–14 PASL season with their home opener victory over the expansion Wichita B-52s on Saturday, November 2, 2013. The team completed its 16-game regular season with a February 16, 2014, victory over the Harrisburg Heat. The team amassed a 14–2 record, placing second in the Central Division and qualifying for the playoffs. Dallas lost the Central Division Semifinal match to the Monterrey Flash, ending their post-season run. The Sidekicks also participated in the 2013–14 United States Open Cup for Arena Soccer, losing to Hidalgo La Fiera in the Round of 16. The team drew well at the box office, averaging 4,002 fans per game, the third best in the PASL.

Dallas was one of 23 teams in the new Major Arena Soccer League (MASL) and hosted the debut game on October 25, 2014, with the Missouri Comets visiting the Sidekicks at the Allen Event Center. The MASL was formed when the PASL absorbed six teams from the failed MISL after the 2013–14 season. After falling to Missouri in the season opener, the team won 8 games in November and December before hitting a 4-game losing skid in January. The Sidekicks regrouped and won 6 straight before closing the regular season with a loss to the Monterrey Flash, earning a 14–6 record overall. Dallas beat Oxford City FC of Texas in the Central Division semi-final but lost to eventual league champion Monterrey in the division final. The team's 3,631 per game attendance average was sixth best in the MASL.

The Sidekicks were one of just two Texas teams to return to the MASL for 2015–16. The failure of the teams in Beaumont and Hidalgo, as well as regional rivals in Wichita and Tulsa, forced a league reorganization that placed Dallas in the Pacific Division of the Western Conference. In June 2015, longtime head coach Tatu left the team, exposing financial issues with the Dallas franchise. A group of local business owners, including Bob Heckel, Sean Porter, and Craig Porter purchased the team in October 2015 and introduced a new head coach, Simon Bozas.

In September 2025, the MASL announced that the Sidekicks would not take part of the 2025-26 season. The team has not been active since then.

== Year-by-year ==
League champions	Runners-up	Division champions*	Playoff berth

Year	League	Reg. season	GF	GA	Pct	Finish	Playoffs	Avg. attendance	Slogan
2012–13	PASL	13–3	140	61	.813	1st, Central	Lost Central Division Finals (0–2) vs. Rio Grande Valley Flash	5,041	"We're Back!"
2013–14	PASL	14–2	150	68	.875	2nd, Central	Lost Central Division Semifinals (0–1) vs. Monterrey Flash	4,002	"Amazing Happens Here"
2014–15	MASL	14–6	153	94	.700	2nd, Southern	Lost Southern Division Finals vs. Monterrey Flash	3,631	
2015–16	MASL	7–13	114	134	.350	5th, Pacific	Did not qualify	2,211	
2016–17	MASL	7–13	138	142	.350	3rd, Southwest	Did not qualify	2,299	"Back To Greatness"
2017–18	MASL	On Hiatus							
2018–19	MASL	9–15	123	173	.375	3rd, Southwest	Did not qualify	2,615	
2019–20	MASL	3–19	92	178	.136	8th, Western	Did not qualify	2,205	
2021	MASL	1–10	44	88	.091	7th, MASL	Lost MASL Quarterfinals (0–2) vs. Ontario Fury	1,018	
2021-22	MASL	11-13	128	165	.458	2nd, Central Division	Lost MASL Quarterfinal (1-2) vs. Kansas City Comets	1,427	
2022-23	MASL	1-23	116	214	.041	7th, Western Conference	Did not qualify	1,294	
2023-24	MASL	6-18	114	205	.250	5th, Western Conference	Did not qualify	1,681	
2024-25	MASL	6-18	121	186	.250	10th	Did not qualify	1,268	

== Honors ==
Central Division championships (1)

- 2012–13

== Head coaches ==
Year	Coach	Games	Won	Lost	Pct
2012–2015	Tatu	52	41	11	.788
2015–2021	Simon Bozas	97	27	70	.278
2021	Pablo Da Silva	3	0	3	.000
2021-2023	Ricardinho Cavalcante	43	12	31	.279
2023-2024	Ed Puskarich	20	3	17	.150
2024-2024	Terry Woodberry	5	3	2	.600

== Personnel ==
=== Roster ===
As of September 18, 2022

==== Active players ====
Note: Flags indicate national team as defined under FIFA eligibility rules; some limited exceptions apply. Players may hold more than one non-FIFA nationality.

No.	Pos.	Nation	Player
0	GK	USA	Chase Coy
1	GK	USA	Juan Gamboa
2	DF	USA	Rio Ramirez
3	DF	USA	Mike Jones
6	MF	USA	David Ortiz
12	DF	USA	Stephen Gonzales
13	MF	USA	Gustavo Piedra
15	FW	USA	Luiz Morales
17	DF	USA	Kristian Quintana
18	MF	USA	Oscar Romero
19	MF	USA	Erik Macias
21	MF	USA	Bryan Martinez

No.	Pos.	Nation	Player
24	DF	USA	Christian Vazquez
27	MF	USA	Sebastian Mendez
28	GK	USA	Estaban Vazquez
32	FW	GBR	Jamie Lovegrove
33	DF	USA	Cody Ellis
41	MF	USA	Billy O'Dwyer
43	DF	USA	Darren Mitchell
51	DF	USA	Cameron Brown
53	FW	CAM	Axel Cahkounte
77	DF	USA	Josemaria (JJ) Oteze
88	FW	USA	Bradlee Baladez
93	FW	BRA	Felipe De Sousa
95	DF	BRA	Felipe Silva

==== Inactive players ====
Note: Flags indicate national team as defined under FIFA eligibility rules; some limited exceptions apply. Players may hold more than one non-FIFA nationality.

No. / Pos. / Nation / Player; 55 / DF / FRA / Simon Sebbah	No. / Pos. / Nation / Player; 99 / FW / BRA / Allyson Angieski

== Developmental team ==
On May 20, 2013, the team announced that some of the players who participated in the 2012–13 season would be joined by prospects to compete as "Sidekicks Premier" in the Premier Arena Soccer League for the Summer 2013 PASL-Premier season. The Sidekicks Premier played their home games at the Inwood Soccer Center in Addison, Texas. The team earned a 7–1 record and placed second in the South Central Division. Although they qualified for the playoffs, team ownership elected not to make the trip to California.

2014 Sidekicks Premier season

The developmental team was scheduled to return in Summer 2014 with former Sidekicks player Nick Stavrou as head coach. They were scheduled to compete against the Wichita B-52s Premier, Texas Xtreme, Dallas Elite (formerly Atletico Barcelona), and Tulsa Revolution Premier in the PASL-Premier's Central Division. The summer schedule was cancelled after the team was unable to secure a suitable playing venue.
