= Tatu (footballer) =

Brazilian footballer and manager

Personal information
- Full name: Antonio Carlos Pecorari
- Date of birth: 1 February 1962 (age 64)
- Place of birth: Mairinque, Brazil
- Height: 5 ft 6 in (1.68 m)
- Position: Forward

Team information
- Current team: Mesquite Outlaws

Senior career*
Years	Team	Apps	(Gls)
1978–1982	São Paulo	73	(13)
1982–1984	Tampa Bay Rowdies	60	(24)
1982–1984	Tampa Bay Rowdies (indoor)	44	(70)
1984–2003	Dallas Sidekicks (indoor)	557	(736)
1987	Toronto International		
1993–1994	Wichita Wings (indoor)	32	(52)

Managerial career
- 1998–2004: Dallas Sidekicks
- 2012–2015: Dallas Sidekicks
- 2019–2024: Mesquite Outlaws/Texas Outlaws
- 2026–: Texas Lone Star SC
- * Club domestic league appearances and goals

Antonio Carlos Pecorari (born 1 February 1962), commonly known as Tatu, is a Brazilian former football coach and former player, and one of the most accomplished indoor football players of all time. He is currently the head coach of the Texas Lone Star SC in the MASLW. His nickname means "armadillo" in Portuguese.

== Playing career ==
In 1981, Tatu came to the United States at age 19, shortly after finishing his first professional season at São Paulo, and scoring 10 goals. He had intended to play for several months, earning enough money to buy a house in São Paulo. Tatu signed with the Tampa Bay Rowdies of the NASL during the 1981–82 indoor season and scored a hat trick in his first appearance even though he had not yet had the opportunity to practice with his new club. He quickly became a fan favorite while playing several more outdoor and indoor seasons in Tampa Bay. He was a member of the Rowdies when they won the 1983 NASL Grand Prix of Indoor Soccer.

The NASL folded in 1984, and Tatu moved to the Dallas Sidekicks of the Major Indoor Soccer League. When Tatu moved to Dallas, the Cleveland Force sued the Sidekicks, arguing they had an agreement with him to purchase his contract from the Rowdies. The Sidekicks eventually gave the Force their second-round 1985 draft choice. In the summer of 1987 he played abroad in Canada's National Soccer League with Toronto International. As a Dallas Sidekick, Tatu was a part of all four Sidekicks' championship teams (1987, 1993, 1998 and 2001). From 1984 until 1992, the Sidekicks played in MISL. The league collapsed in 1992, and Dallas moved to the newly created Continental Indoor Soccer League until that league also collapsed in 1997. The CISL played during the summer, and Tatu spent the 1993–94 winter indoor season with the Wichita Wings of the National Professional Soccer League.

In 1998, the Sidekicks competed in the Premier Soccer Alliance. The PSA became the World Indoor Soccer League in 1999. In 2002, Dallas entered the newly reconstituted Major Indoor Soccer League. Tatu retired from playing in 2003.

== Coaching career ==
In 1998, Tatu replaced Gordon Jago as the head coach of the Dallas Sidekicks. Tatu is the only person to win the player of the year and the coach of the year in the same season (1998). As a head coach, he went 63–53 in the regular season and 7–3 in the playoffs.

Tatu also spent six years coaching at The Highlands School in Irving, Texas, where he coached the Blazers to three state championships in 1997, 1998 and 2000. The high school team which he coaches now is Prince of Peace Christian School in Carrollton, Texas. He led the Prince of Peace varsity boys to seven TAPPS state championships: 2003, 2004, 2005, 2006 (all fall championships) and 2009-2010, 2010-2011, 2011–2012, 2021-2022, (all winter championships). In the 2017–18 season, Tatu led his team to the TAPPS State Final Four where the Eagles lost during a torrential downpour against Brighter Horizons Academy. Tatu currently has also been coaching several girls' soccer teams for the Sting Soccer Club in North Texas.

In April 2012, it was announced that the Dallas Sidekicks would return to the indoor game as part of the Professional Arena Soccer League for the 2012–13 season. Tatu was a co-owner of the team and served as both the team's general manager and head coach for the inaugural season. He would remain with the club for three seasons, leaving in 2015.

On 22 July 2019, Tatu was named the first-ever head coach for the Major Arena Soccer League's Mesquite Outlaws.

On September 28, 2026, Tatu was revealed to become the new coach for Texas Lone Star SC of the Major Arena Soccer League Women.

== Legacy ==
Tatu was known for throwing his jersey into the crowd after scoring a goal, a tradition that started during his time with the Tampa Bay Rowdies. He is a well-respected sports figure in Dallas because he is considered to be one of the best players to have played the indoor game in the U.S. His community involvement includes running many soccer camps in the Dallas area. When the Olympic Torch came through Dallas for the 2002 Salt Lake City games, Tatu had the honor as serving as a torch bearer.

Tatu has many indoor soccer records. He is second all-time in goal scoring with 857. He has the second most seasons played (21). Only Victor Nogueira has played more with 23 seasons. He is seventh on the all-time list with games played (633). He is also second in points (1585), second in shots (4396) and second in game-winning goals (77). He is the leader in power play goals with 113. Tatu is one of 3 players to have won all 4 championships with the Dallas Sidekicks.

In October 2011, Tatu was a member of the inaugural class of inductees into the Indoor Soccer Hall of Fame. At halftime of the 9 February 2013, game against the Rockford Rampage, the current Dallas Sidekicks retired Tatu's #9 jersey, honoring his long tenure as both a player and a coach for the original Dallas Sidekicks. On November 12, 2026, Tatu was informed he would be inducted into the National Soccer Hall of Fame in Frisco in April 2027.
