= Angel Rivillo =

Venezuelan soccer player (born 1978)

Personal information
- Full name: Ángel Jesus Rivillo Ruiz
- Date of birth: July 25, 1978 (age 48)
- Place of birth: Toulouse, France
- Height: 5 ft 7 in (1.70 m)
- Position: Midfielder

Youth career
- 1994–1995: Dallas Inter

College career
Years	Team	Apps	(Gls)
1996–1998	ETBU Tigers		
1998–1999	Creighton Bluejays		

Senior career*
Years	Team	Apps	(Gls)
2000	Dallas Burn	1	(0)
2000	→ MLS Pro-40 (loan)	1	(0)
2000	Nashville Metros	3	(1)
2000	Texas Rattlers	3	(2)
2000–2001	Toulouse Fontaines		
2001–2002	Deportivo Táchira	6	(0)
2002	Milwaukee Rampage	25	(4)
2003–2006	Milwaukee Wave (indoor)	77	(28)
2006	Chicago Fire Reserves	7	(0)
2007	Atlanta Silverbacks	25	(0)
2007–2010	Philadelphia KiXX (indoor)	51	(15)
2008	New York Red Bulls Reserves	1	(0)
2011–2012	Wichita Wings (indoor)	5	(4)
2013–2014	Pennsylvania Roar (indoor)	18	(1)
2014–2015	Dallas Sidekicks (indoor)	8	(3)
Total		227	(58)

International career
- Venezuela U15
- Venezuela U17
- Venezuela U23
- * Club domestic league appearances and goals

Ángel Jesus Rivillo Ruiz (born July 25, 1978) is a former Venezuelan soccer player who played for the Dallas Burn in the MLS.

== Club career ==
Rivillo was born in Toulouse, France, and moved to Caracas, Venezuela where he played his youth years until he moved to Dallas, Texas in 1994. He joined local side Dallas Inter, before going on to study at both East Texas Baptist University and Creighton University. He was drafted in the sixth round of the 2000 MLS SuperDraft by Dallas Burn, with whom he made one league appearance in the 2000 Major League Soccer season.

After being released by Dallas Burn, Rivillo moved to France to play for Toulouse Fontaines, before returning to his native Venezuela to join Deportivo Táchira.

== International career ==
Rivillo represented Venezuela at under-15, under-17 and under-23 level.

== Career statistics ==
=== Club ===
Club	Season	League			Cup		Other		Total	
Club	Season	Division	Apps	Goals	Apps	Goals	Apps	Goals	Apps	Goals
Dallas Burn	2000	MLS	1	0	1 (Note: Appearances in the U.S. Open Cup)	0	0	0	2	0
MLS Pro-40 (loan)	2000	USL A-League	1	0	0	0	0	0	1	0
Nashville Metros	2000	USL A-League	3	1	0	0	0	0	3	1
Texas Rattlers	2000	USISL D-3 Pro League	3	2	0	0	0	0	3	2
Milwaukee Rampage	2002	USL A-League	25	4	0	0	0	0	25	4
Milwaukee Wave	2003–04	MISL	22	5	0	0	0	0	22	5
Milwaukee Wave	2004–05	MISL	35	18	0	0	0	0	35	18
Milwaukee Wave	2005–06	MISL	20	5	0	0	0	0	20	5
Milwaukee Wave	Total		77	28	0	0	0	0	77	28
Chicago Fire Reserves	2006	MLS Reserve League	7	0	0	0	0	0	7	0
Atlanta Silverbacks	2007	USL First Division	25	0	0	0	0	0	25	0
Philadelphia KiXX	2007–08	MISL	26	10	0	0	0	0	26	10
Philadelphia KiXX	2008–09	NISL	15	4	0	0	0	0	15	4
Philadelphia KiXX	2009–10	MISL	10	1	0	0	0	0	10	1
Philadelphia KiXX	Total		51	15	0	0	0	0	51	15
New York Red Bulls Reserves	2008	MLS Reserve League	1	0	0	0	0	0	1	0
Wichita Wings	2011–12	MISL	5	4	0	0	0	0	5	4
Pennsylvania Roar	2013–14	MISL	18	1	0	0	0	0	18	1
Dallas Sidekicks	2014–15	MASL	8	3	0	0	0	0	8	3
Career total			227	58	1	0	0	0	228	58
