= 2014–15 Syracuse Silver Knights season =

Syracuse Silver Knights
2014–15 MASL season
- Owner: Tommy Tanner
- Head Coach: Tommy Tanner
- Arena: Oncenter War Memorial Arena; 800 South State Street; Syracuse, New York 13202
- Major Arena Soccer League: 2nd, Eastern (regular season)
- Ron Newman Cup: Lost Division Semi-Finals
- Top goalscorer: Elmo Neto (26 goals, 14 assists)
- Highest home attendance: 3,814 (January 18 vs. Harrisburg Heat)
- Lowest home attendance: 2,237 (December 19 vs. Baltimore Blast)
- Average home league attendance: 3,082 (10 games)

The 2014–15 Syracuse Silver Knights season was the fourth season of the Syracuse Silver Knights professional indoor soccer club. The Silver Knights, an Eastern Division team in the Major Arena Soccer League, played their home games at the Oncenter War Memorial Arena in downtown Syracuse, New York.

The team was led by owner/head coach Tommy Tanner and assistant coach Joe Papaleo. The Silver Knights earned a 12–8 record and second place in the Eastern Division during the regular season. The team qualified for the playoffs but lost the Eastern Division Semi-Finals to the Rochester Lancers when the tie-breaking mini-game ended 3–2 in Rochester's favor.

== Season summary ==
The Silver Knights struggled early in the season as they lost to the Baltimore Blast in their season opener then again twice more in the course of losing 5 of their first 7 games. Over the next 7 games, they beat the Harrisburg Heat and Rochester Lancers 3 times each, losing only to Baltimore for the fourth and final time this season. Syracuse finished strong, winning 4 of their last 6, but dropping home and road matchups against Rochester. Finishing with a 12–8 record, the Silver Knights placed second (to Baltimore) in the Eastern Division and qualified for the playoffs. They lost to Rochester in the first game of the Eastern Division Semi-Finals on the road then won the second game at home. The decisive 15-minute "mini-game" saw each team score just one goal but Rochester's came from outside the 45-foot arc and Syracuse lost 3–2 under multi-point scoring rules. This was the second consecutive season where Syracuse was forced from the post-season after losing a mini-game tie-breaker in 2014 as they fell to the Baltimore Blast.

== History ==
Launched as an expansion team in the third Major Indoor Soccer League for the 2011–12 season, went a combined 29–41 in their three seasons as members of the MISL, qualifying for the playoffs only once. After the 2013-14 season, Syracuse was one of three teams that left the MISL, leading to the league's collapse. Along with five other former MISL teams, the Silver Knights joined the teams of the Professional Arena Soccer League, which was soon rebranded as the MASL. The other teams in the Eastern Division are former MISL clubs Baltimore Blast and Rochester Lancers, plus PASL clubs Detroit Waza and Harrisburg Heat.

== Off-field moves ==
Four of the five Eastern Division teams (the three former MISL clubs plus Harrisburg) will keep score with multi-point scoring at their home games. Most goals will be worth two points but goals scored from outside a 45-foot arc on the turf will be worth three points. Games played at Detroit or in the Central, Southern, and Pacific Divisions will be scored with traditional soccer scoring where each goal is worth one point.

The Silver Knights have scheduled three jersey auction nights where the team will wear a special uniform top to be auctioned that night for charity. The first, January 16, raises funds for JDRF (formerly known as the Juvenile Diabetes Research Foundation) with all-white jerseys. The second, in February, raises funds to support the families of soldiers stationed at Fort Drum with camouflage jerseys. The third, March 1, raises funds for the Syracuse St. Patrick's Parade with all-green jerseys.

== Schedule ==
Win Loss

=== Pre-season ===
Game	Day	Date	Kickoff	Opponent	Results		Location	Attendance
Game	Day	Date	Kickoff	Opponent	Score	Record	Location	Attendance
1	Saturday	November 1	7:00pm	Fort Drum Mountain Lions	W 18–3	1–0	CNY Family Sports Centre	

=== Regular season ===
Game	Day	Date	Kickoff	Opponent	Results		Location	Attendance
Game	Day	Date	Kickoff	Opponent	Score	Record	Location	Attendance
1	Saturday	November 8	7:35pm	at Baltimore Blast	L 7–16	0–1	Royal Farms Arena	7,812
2	Friday	November 21	7:30pm	Ontario Fury	W 18–2	1–1	Oncenter War Memorial Arena	3,355
3	Saturday	November 29	7:00pm	Baltimore Blast	L 4–11	1–2	Oncenter War Memorial Arena	2,951
4	Saturday	December 6	7:05pm	at Detroit Waza♣	L 6–8	1–3	Melvindale Civic Center	534
5	Saturday	December 13	7:00pm	Harrisburg Heat	W 26–8	2–3	Oncenter War Memorial Arena	2,516
6	Friday	December 19	7:30pm	Baltimore Blast	L 4–12	2–4	Oncenter War Memorial Arena	2,237
7	Saturday	December 20	1:00pm	at Rochester Lancers	L 11–12 (SO)	2–5	Blue Cross Arena	5,004
8	Saturday	December 27	7:05pm	at Harrisburg Heat	W 24–18	3–5	Farm Show Large Arena	1,339
9	Thursday	January 1	4:00pm	at Rochester Lancers	W 18–10	4–5	Blue Cross Arena	6,850
10	Friday	January 9	7:30pm	Rochester Lancers	W 21–15	5–5	Oncenter War Memorial Arena	2,857
11	Saturday	January 10	7:35pm	at Baltimore Blast	L 4–22	5–6	Royal Farms Arena	6,431
12	Friday	January 16	7:30pm	Rochester Lancers	W 12–11	6–6	Oncenter War Memorial Arena	3,217
13	Sunday	January 18	1:00pm	Harrisburg Heat	W 24–9	7–6	Oncenter War Memorial Arena	3,814
14	Saturday	January 24	7:05pm	at Harrisburg Heat	W 26–14	8–6	Farm Show Large Arena	2,279
15	Sunday	January 25	4:00pm	at Rochester Lancers	L 8–10	8–7	Blue Cross Arena	7,105
16	Saturday	February 14	1:05pm	at Milwaukee Wave♣	W 10–9 (OT)	9–7	UW–Milwaukee Panther Arena	3,370
17	Sunday	February 15	3:05pm	at Chicago Mustangs♣	W 7–3	10–7	Sears Centre	2,018
18	Thursday	February 19	7:00pm	Chicago Mustangs	W 23–16	11–7	Oncenter War Memorial Arena	3,169
19	Sunday	February 22	4:00pm	Rochester Lancers	L 7–9	11–8	Oncenter War Memorial Arena	3,429
20	Sunday	March 1	4:00pm	Detroit Waza	W 17–7	12–8	Oncenter War Memorial Arena	3,281

♣ Game played with traditional soccer scoring (all goals worth 1 point).

=== Post-season ===
Game	Day	Date	Kickoff	Opponent	Results		Location	Attendance
Game	Day	Date	Kickoff	Opponent	Score	Record	Location	Attendance
Division Playoff #1	Thursday	March 5	7:35pm	at Rochester Lancers	L 7–20	0–1	Blue Cross Arena	5,129
Division Playoff #2	Sunday	March 8	4:00pm	Rochester Lancers	W 17–6	1–1	Oncenter War Memorial Arena	4,355
Division Playoff #3	Sunday	March 8	6:30pm	at Syracuse Silver Knights	L 2–3	1–2	Oncenter War Memorial Arena	4,355

^{1} Mini-game played as a tie-breaker.

== Awards and honors ==
Syracuse defender Nelson Santana was selected for the 2014-15 MASL All-League Third Team.

Syracuse goalkeeper Rick Pflasterer earned honorable mention for the league's all-rookie team for 2014-15.
