= 2010–11 Major Indoor Soccer League season =

Major Indoor Soccer League
- Season: 2010-11
- Champions: Milwaukee Wave

The 2010–11 Major Indoor Soccer League season was the third season for the league, and second under the MISL banner. It was the 33rd season of professional Division 1 indoor soccer.

Three new teams, the Omaha Vipers, the Missouri Comets, and the Chicago Riot joined the league prior to the season's beginning.

== Teams ==
Team	City/Area	Arena
Baltimore Blast	Baltimore, Maryland	1st Mariner Arena
Chicago Riot	Villa Park, Illinois	Odeum Expo Center
Milwaukee Wave	Milwaukee, Wisconsin	UW–Milwaukee Panther Arena
Missouri Comets	Independence, Missouri	Independence Events Center
Omaha Vipers	Omaha, Nebraska	Omaha Civic Auditorium

== Map of clubs ==
Major Indoor Soccer League clubs

== Standings ==
Blue indicates bye into the MISL Championship
Green indicates playoff berth clinched

Club		GP	W	L	PCT	PF	PA	GB	Home	Road
1	Baltimore Blast	20	15	5	.750	279	198	-	8-2	7-3
2	Milwaukee Wave	20	15	5	.750	266	191	-	8-3	7-2
3	Missouri Comets	20	8	12	.400	240	274	7	4-7	4-5
4	Omaha Vipers	20	7	13	.350	190	246	8	4-6	3-7
5	Chicago Riot	20	5	15	.250	207	273	10	3-5	2-10

Baltimore was the #1 seed due to head-to-head tiebreaker over Milwaukee (4-2)

== Statistics ==
=== Top scorers ===
Rank	Scorer	Club	Games	2pt Goals	3pt Goals	Assists	Points
1	(Mexico) Byron Alvarez	Missouri Comets	20	31	2	12	80
2	(Canada) Marco Terminesi	Milwaukee Wave	19	22	3	19	72
3	(United States) Jamar Beasley	Missouri Comets	20	18	2	12	54
4	(Montenegro) Bato Radončić	Chicago Riot	18	20	1	6	49
4	(Chile) Carlos Farias	Omaha Vipers	14	12	5	10	49
6	(United States) Pat Healey	Baltimore Blast	20	16	1	13	48
6	(Canada) Giuliano Oliviero	Milwaukee Wave	20	15	2	12	48
8	(Liberia) Leo Gibson	Missouri Comets	20	10	4	13	45
8	(Haiti) Max Ferdinand	Baltimore Blast	20	11	4	11	45
10	(United States) Pat Morris	Baltimore Blast	20	12	4	6	42
10	(Jamaica) Machel Millwood	Baltimore Blast	16	12	1	15	42

=== Top 2pt Goal Scorers ===
Rank	Scorer	Club	Games	2pt Goals
1	(Mexico) Byron Alvarez	Missouri Comets	20	31
2	(Canada) Marco Terminesi	Milwaukee Wave	19	22
3	(Montenegro) Bato Radončić	Chicago Riot	18	20
4	(United States) Jamar Beasley	Missouri Comets	20	18
5	(Brazil) Hewerton Moreira	Milwaukee Wave	19	17
6	(United States) Pat Healey	Baltimore Blast	20	16
6	(Colombia) Johnny Torres	Omaha Vipers	17	16
8	(Canada) Giuliano Oliviero	Milwaukee Wave	20	15
9	(Chile) Carlos Farias	Omaha Vipers	14	12
9	(United States) Pat Morris	Baltimore Blast	20	12
9	(Jamaica) Machel Millwood	Baltimore Blast	15	12

== Playoffs ==
The format for the playoffs is the same as the 2009–10 MISL format. The first place team in the season will get a bye into the finals, while the second and third place teams play a two-game, home-and-home, series, with a third golden goal game taking place at the second place team's home if needed.

=== Semifinals ===
Game 1

March 16, 2011

Milwaukee Wave	5-11	Missouri Comets

Independence Events Center
Attendance: 3,798

Game 2

March 20, 2011

Missouri Comets	18-20	Milwaukee Wave

U.S. Cellular Arena
Attendance: 3,147

Mini-Game Tie Breaker

March 20, 2011

Missouri Comets	2-5	Milwaukee Wave

U.S. Cellular Arena
Attendance: 3,147

=== Championship ===
March 25, 2011

Milwaukee Wave	16-7	Baltimore Blast

1st Mariner Arena
Attendance: 10,274

== Bracket ==
Semifinals (best-of-2 series)			Championship (single game)
			2	Milwaukee Wave	16
3	Missouri Comets	1	1	Baltimore Blast	7
2	Milwaukee Wave	2

== Awards ==
Award	Name	Team
MVP	Byron Alvarez	Missouri Comets
Coach of the Year	Danny Kelly	Baltimore Blast
Rookie of the Year	Lucas Rodríguez	Missouri Comets
Defender of the Year	Pat Morris	Baltimore Blast
Goalkeeper of the Year	Sagu	Baltimore Blast
Championship MVP	Marcel Feenstra	Milwaukee Wave

=== All-League First Team ===
Name	Position	Team
Pat Morris	D	Baltimore Blast
Leo Gibson	D	Missouri Comets
Marco Terminisi	M	Milwaukee Wave
Bato Radoncic	M	Chicago Riot
Byron Alvarez	F	Missouri Comets
Sagu	GK	Baltimore Blast

=== All-League Second Team ===
Name	Position	Team
Mike Lookingland	D	Baltimore Blast
Josh Rife	D	Milwaukee Wave
Pat Healey	M	Baltimore Blast
Jamar Beasley	F	Chicago Riot
Johnny Torres	F	Omaha Vipers
Nick Vorberg	GK	Milwaukee Wave

=== All-Rookie Team ===
Name	Position	Team
Ryan Junge	D	Omaha Vipers
Brian Harris	D	Missouri Comets
Lucas Rodriquez	M	Missouri Comets
Mauricio Hernández	F	Omaha Vipers
Alex Megson	F	Chicago Riot
Joshua Miller	GK	Omaha Vipers
