= 2011–12 Major Indoor Soccer League season =

Major Indoor Soccer League
- Season: 2011–12
- Champions: Milwaukee Wave (6th title)
- Top goalscorer: Geison (Missouri, 37)
- Longest winning run: Milwaukee Wave, 8 wins November 13th, 2011 – December 27th, 2011
- Longest losing run: Norfolk SharX, 9 losses November 11th, 2011 – December 22nd, 2011
- Highest attendance: 9,644 Milwaukee at Baltimore February 18th, 2012
- Lowest attendance: 837 Rochester at Norfolk December 1st, 2011
- Average attendance: 4,009

The 2011–12 Major Indoor Soccer League season was the third under the MISL banner and fourth season overall. It was also the 34th season of professional Division 1 indoor soccer. The Milwaukee Wave won their sixth title in franchise history and second MISL title in a row.

In May 2011, the United Soccer Leagues announced it had entered into an agreement with the MISL to operate the indoor league. In September, the Chicago Kick announced that they were unable to secure an arena in time to begin play for 2011–12 but planned to join the MISL in 2012–13.

Besides the aborted team in Chicago, other franchises were added in Syracuse, Norfolk, Rochester, and Wichita. Of the four, the reborn Rochester Lancers were the most successful, finishing second in league attendance and qualifying for the league playoffs.

== Teams ==
=== New teams ===
Team	City/area	Arena	Joined	Head coach
Norfolk SharX	Norfolk, Virginia	Norfolk Scope	2011	(England) Jon Hall
Rochester Lancers	Rochester, New York	Blue Cross Arena	2011	(United States) Bill Andracki
Syracuse Silver Knights	Syracuse, New York	War Memorial at Oncenter	2011	(United States) Tommy Tanner
Wichita Wings	Park City, Kansas (Wichita area)	Hartman Arena	2011	(United States) LeBaron Hollimon

=== Teams that left the MISL ===
Team	City/area	Arena	Founded	Joined MISL	Left MISL	New league
Chicago Riot	Chicago	Odeum Expo Center	2010	2010	2011	Folded
Omaha Vipers	Omaha, Nebraska	Omaha Civic Auditorium	2010	2010	2011	Folded after joining the PASL-Pro

== Map of clubs ==
Eastern Division Western Division

== Standings ==
2011–12 League Champions 2011–12 Playoff Team

=== Eastern Division ===
Team		GP	W	L	PCT	PF	PA	GB	Home	Road
1	Baltimore Blast	24	18	6	.750	344	238	–	9-3	9-3
2	Rochester Lancers	24	11	13	.458	325	321	7	6-6	5-7
3	Syracuse Silver Knights	24	9	15	.375	330	370	9	5-7	4-8
4	Norfolk SharX	24	5	19	.208	222	434	13	4-8	1-11

=== Central Division ===
Team		GP	W	L	PCT	PF	PA	GB	Home	Road
1	Milwaukee Wave	24	18	6	.750	356	264	–	10-2	8-4
2	Missouri Comets	24	15	9	.625	340	258	3	8-4	7-5
3	Wichita Wings	24	8	16	.333	262	294	10	6-6	2-10

Updated to matches played on March 5, 2012.

== Statistics ==
=== Top scorers ===
Rank	Scorer	Club	Games	2pt goals	3pt goals	Assists	Points
1	(Brazil) Geison	Missouri Comets	24	33	4	12	90
2	(Brazil) Mauricio Salles	Rochester Lancers	24	22	8	13	81
3	(Mexico) Byron Alvarez	Missouri Comets	23	27	1	21	78
4	(United States) Max Ferdinand	Baltimore Blast	24	22	1	25	72
5	(Jamaica) Machel Millwood	Baltimore Blast	24	23	3	16	71
6	(United States) Doug Miller	Rochester Lancers	23	23	2	14	66
7	(Bosnia and Herzegovina) Slaviša Ubiparipović	Syracuse Silver Knights	24	19	3	14	61
7	(United States) Greg Howes	Milwaukee Wave	22	21	0	19	61
9	(United States) Jamar Beasley	Wichita Wings	24	21	1	14	59
10	(Canada) Vahid Assadpour	Missouri Comets	21	17	2	16	56

Last updated on March 8, 2012. Source: MISL.com Statistics - Total Points

=== Top 2pt goal scorers ===
Rank	Scorer	Club	Games	2pt goals
1	(Brazil) Geison	Missouri Comets	24	33
2	(Mexico) Byron Alvarez	Missouri Comets	23	27
3	(Jamaica) Machel Millwood	Baltimore Blast	23	23
3	(United States) Doug Miller	Rochester Lancers	23	23
5	(Brazil) Mauricio Salles	Rochester Lancers	24	22
5	(United States) Max Ferdinand	Baltimore Blast	24	22
7	(United States) Jamar Beasley	Wichita Wings	24	21
7	(United States) Greg Howes	Milwaukee Wave	22	21
9	(Bosnia and Herzegovina) Slaviša Ubiparipović	Syracuse Silver Knights	24	19
9	(United States) Jeff Hughes	Syracuse Silver Knights	24	19

Last updated on March 8, 2012. Source: MISL.com Statistics - 2 Point Goals

== Playoffs ==
Both rounds of the playoffs were in a home and home format. The higher seed had the option to choose whether to host the first or second game. A mini-game would be held immediately after Game 2 if the series was tied at one win apiece. Baltimore had the top seed, due to their 2–1 season series win over Milwaukee.

Division Finals
1E	Baltimore	2
2E	Rochester	0
1C	Milwaukee	2
2C	Missouri	0

Championship
1E	Baltimore	0
1C	Milwaukee	2

=== Division Finals ===
==== Game 1 ====
March 9, 2012

Milwaukee Wave	27–10	Missouri Comets
	Report

Independence Events Center
Attendance: 4,624
Referee: Ron Cory

March 10, 2012

Rochester Lancers	2–8	Baltimore Blast
	Report

1st Mariner Arena
Attendance: 5,322
Referee: Joseph Della Penna

==== Game 2 ====
March 11, 2012

Missouri Comets	7–9	Milwaukee Wave
	Report

U.S. Cellular Arena
Attendance: 5,453
Referee: Rich Grady

March 12, 2012

Baltimore Blast	14–8	Rochester Lancers
	Report

Blue Cross Arena
Attendance: 4,106
Referee: Tim Tyma

=== MISL Finals ===
==== Game 1 ====
March 16, 2012

Milwaukee Wave	14–2	Baltimore Blast
	Report

1st Mariner Arena
Attendance: 6,072
Referee: Tim Tyma

==== Game 2 ====
March 18, 2012

Baltimore Blast	10–12 (OT)	Milwaukee Wave
	Report

U.S. Cellular Arena
Attendance: 5,243
Referee: Rich Grady

== Awards ==
Award	Name	Team
MVP	Geison	Missouri Comets
Coach of the Year	Keith Tozer	Milwaukee Wave
Rookie of the Year	Slaviša Ubiparipović	Syracuse Silver Knights
Defender of the Year	Mike Lookingland	Baltimore Blast
Goalkeeper of the Year	Sagu	Baltimore Blast
Championship MVP	Marcio Leite	Milwaukee Wave

=== All-League First Team ===
Name	Position	Team
Mike Lookingland	D	Baltimore Blast
Nelson Santana	D	Syracuse Silver Knights
Geison	M	Missouri Comets
Max Ferdinand	M	Baltimore Blast
Mauricio Salles	F	Rochester Lancers
Sagu	GK	Baltimore Blast

=== All-League Second Team ===
Name	Position	Team
Leo Gibson	D	Missouri Comets
Joe Hammes	D	Milwaukee Wave
Marcio Leite	M	Milwaukee Wave
Byron Alvarez	F	Missouri Comets
Machel Millwood	F	Baltimore Blast
Danny Waltman	GK	Missouri Comets

=== All-Rookie Team ===
Name	Position	Team
Stephen DeRoux	D	Baltimore Blast
Gerson Dos Santos	D	Norfolk SharX
Kevin Ten Eyck	M	Wichita Wings
Slaviša Ubiparipović	F	Syracuse Silver Knights
Nicolas Perera	F	Milwaukee Wave
Eric Reed	GK	Syracuse Silver Knights
