= Chris Brunt (American soccer) =

American soccer player (born 1980)

Personal information
- Date of birth: January 1, 1980 (age 46)
- Place of birth: Omaha, Nebraska, U.S.
- Height: 5 ft 11 in (1.80 m)
- Position: Defender

College career
Years	Team	Apps	(Gls)
1998–2001	Southwest Missouri State Bears	68	(20)

Senior career*
Years	Team	Apps	(Gls)
2000	Des Moines Menace		
2002–2003	Kansas City Wizards	9	(1)
2004–2005	Minnesota Thunder	47	(2)
2005	Columbus Crew Reserves	1	(0)
2006	Charleston Battery	6	(0)
2010–2011	Omaha Vipers (indoor)	18	(1)
Total		81	(4)
- * Club domestic league appearances and goals

Chris Brunt (born January 1, 1980) is an American former soccer player who played for Kansas City Wizards in the MLS.

== Post-playing career ==
In 2012, Brunt returned to his hometown of Omaha to set up the Evolution Soccer Academy.

== Career statistics ==
Appearances and goals by club, season and competition
Club	Season	League			Cup		Continental		Other		Total	
Club	Season	Division	Apps	Goals	Apps	Goals	Apps	Goals	Apps	Goals	Apps	Goals
Kansas City Wizards	2002	MLS	5	0	3 (Note: Appearances in the U.S. Open Cup)	0	2 (Note: Appearances in the CONCACAF Champions League)	0	0	0	5	0
Kansas City Wizards	2003	MLS	4	1	1	0	0	0	0	0	4	1
Kansas City Wizards	Total		9	1	4	0	2	0	0	0	15	1
Minnesota Thunder	2004	USL	24	1	0	0	–		0	0	24	1
Minnesota Thunder	2005	USL	23	1	0	0	–		0	0	23	1
Minnesota Thunder	Total		47	2	0	0	0	0	0	0	47	2
Columbus Crew Reserves	2005	MLS Reserve League	1	0	0	0	–		0	0	1	0
Charleston Battery	2006	USL	6	0	0	0	–		0	0	6	0
Omaha Vipers	2010–11	MISL	18	1	0	0	–		0	0	18	1
Career total			81	4	4	0	2	0	0	0	87	4
