= 2012–13 Major Indoor Soccer League season =

Major Indoor Soccer League
- Season: 2012-13
- Champions: Baltimore Blast
- Top goalscorer: Doug Miller (Rochester, 44)
- Longest winning run: Milwaukee Wave, 16 wins December 1st, 2012 – February 10th, 2013
- Longest losing run: Wichita Wings, 6 losses February 8th, 2013 – March 3rd, 2013; Rochester Lancers, 6 losses December 22nd, 2012 – January 12th, 2013
- Average attendance: 4,143

The 2012–13 Major Indoor Soccer League season was the second under the United Soccer Leagues banner, fourth under the MISL name, and the fifth season overall. It was also the 35th season of professional Division 1 indoor soccer. The season started on November 2, 2012 and ended on March 3, 2013.

== Teams ==
=== New Teams ===
Team	City/Area	Arena	Joined	Head Coach
Chicago Soul	Chicago	Sears Centre	2012	(Chile) Manny Rojas

=== Teams that left the MISL ===
Team	City/Area	Arena	Founded	Joined MISL	Left MISL	New League
Norfolk SharX	Norfolk, Virginia	Norfolk Scope	2011	2011	2012	Folded

== Map of clubs ==
Major Indoor Soccer League clubs

== Managerial changes ==
Team	Outgoing manager	Incoming manager	Date of appointment
Rochester Lancers	(United States) Bill Andracki	(United States) Jim Hesch	Offseason
Chicago Soul	(Chile) Manny Rojas	(Montenegro) Novi Marojević	December 11

== Standings ==
2012-13 League Champions 2012-13 Playoff Team

Team		GP	W	L	PCT	PF	PA	GB	Home	Road
1	Baltimore Blast	26	21	5	.808	379	228	---	12-1	9-4
2	Milwaukee Wave	26	21	5	.808	310	230	---	12-1	9-4
3	Missouri Comets	26	13	13	.500	330	363	8	9-4	4-9
4	Chicago Soul	26	11	15	.423	293	308	10	7-6	4-9
5	Rochester Lancers	26	10	16	.385	326	385	11	7-6	3-10
6	Syracuse Silver Knights	26	8	18	.308	279	328	13	5-8	3-10
7	Wichita Wings	26	7	19	.269	260	335	14	6-7	1-12

Updated to matches played on 3/3/2013

== Statistics ==
=== Top scorers ===
Rank	Scorer	Club	Games	2pt Goals	3pt Goals	Assists	Points
1	(United States) Doug Miller	Rochester Lancers	25	41	3	11	102
2	(Brazil) Mauricio Salles	Rochester Lancers	25	25	9	20	97
3	(Brazil) Neto	Syracuse Silver Knights	26	32	2	8	78
3	(Chile) Carlos Farias	Chicago Soul	24	13	9	25	78
5	(Mexico) Byron Alvarez	Missouri Comets	23	31	1	9	74
6	(Canada) Vahid Assadpour	Missouri Comets	26	14	5	27	70
7	(Liberia) Leo Gibson	Missouri Comets	24	23	3	12	67
8	(Brazil) Frederico Moojen	Wichita Wings	24	27	0	12	66
8	(Brazil) Luan Oliveira	Milwaukee Wave	25	23	2	14	66
10	(Uruguay) Carlos Muñoz	Chicago Soul	25	21	4	8	62

Last updated on March 3, 2013. Source: MISL.com Statistics - Total Points

=== Top 2pt Goal Scorers ===
Rank	Scorer	Club	Games	2pt Goals
1	(United States) Doug Miller	Rochester Lancers	25	41
2	(Mexico) Neto	Syracuse Silver Knights	26	32
3	(Mexico) Byron Alvarez	Missouri Comets	23	31
4	(Brazil) Frederico Moojen	Wichita Wings	24	27
5	(Brazil) Mauricio Salles	Rochester Lancers	25	25
6	(Canada) Ian Bennett	Milwaukee Wave	26	23
6	(Brazil) Luan Oliveira	Milwaukee Wave	25	23
6	(Liberia) Leo Gibson	Missouri Comets	24	23
9	(Uruguay) Carlos Muñoz	Chicago Soul	25	21
9	(United States) Andrew Hoxie	Wichita Wings	24	21

Last updated on March 3, 2013. Source: MISL.com Statistics - 2 Point Goals

== Playoffs ==
The MISL Playoffs will begin with the semifinals, featuring the No. 1 and No. 4 seeds and the No. 2 and No. 3 seeds meeting in home-and-home series with a 15-minute mini game to decide the series following the second game if needed. The championship followed the same format. The higher seed will had the option to choose which game it hosts.

Semi-Finals
1	Baltimore	2
4	Chicago	0
2	Milwaukee	1
3	Missouri	2

Championship
1	Baltimore	2
3	Missouri	0

=== Semi-finals ===
Game 1

March 5, 2013
8:30 pm CST

Chicago Soul	13 – 22	Baltimore Blast
	Report

Odeum Expo Center
March 7, 2013
8:35 pm CST

Missouri Comets	10 – 12 (OT)	Milwaukee Wave
	Report

Independence Events Center
Attendance: 3,889
Referee: Ron Cory

Game 2

March 9, 2013
7:35 pm EST

Baltimore Blast	10 – 7	Chicago Soul
	Report

1st Mariner Arena
Attendance: 5,308
Referee: Ryan Cigich
March 10, 2013
4:00 pm CST

Milwaukee Wave	8 – 9	Missouri Comets
	Report

U.S. Cellular Arena
Attendance: 7,518
Referee: Ryan Cigich

Mini-Game Tie Breaker

March 10, 2013
6:00 pm CST

Milwaukee Wave	4 – 5	Missouri Comets
	Report

U.S. Cellular Arena
Attendance: 7,518
Referee: Ryan Cigich

=== MISL Finals ===
Game 1

March 14, 2013
7:35 pm CDT

Missouri Comets	12 – 21	Baltimore Blast
	Report; Report

Independence Events Center
Attendance: 5,279
Referee: Ryan Cigich

Game 2

March 16, 2013
7:35 pm EDT

Baltimore Blast	8 – 6	Missouri Comets
	Report; Report

1st Mariner Arena
Attendance: 8,704
Referee: Rich Grady

== Awards ==
=== Individual awards ===
Award	Name	Team
MVP	Doug Miller	Rochester Lancers
Coach of the Year	Danny Kelly	Baltimore Blast
Rookie of the Year	Luan Oliveira	Milwaukee Wave
Defender of the Year	Mike Lookingland	Baltimore Blast
Goalkeeper of the Year	Nick Vorberg	Milwaukee Wave
Championship MVP	William Vanzela	Baltimore Blast

=== All-League First Team ===
Name	Position	Team
Leo Gibson	D	Missouri Comets
Mike Lookingland	D	Baltimore Blast
Doug Miller	M/F	Rochester Lancers
Neto	M/F	Syracuse Silver Knights
Mauricio Salles	M/F	Rochester Lancers
Nick Vorberg	GK	Milwaukee Wave

=== All-League Second Team ===
Name	Position	Team
Pat Healey	D	Baltimore Blast
Nelson Santana	D	Syracuse Silver Knights
Vahid Assadpour	M/F	Missouri Comets
Carlos Farias	M/F	Chicago Soul
Luan Oliveira	M/F	Milwaukee Wave
Jeff Richey	GK	Chicago Soul

=== All-Rookie Team ===
Name	Position	Team
Stephen Basso	D	Rochester Lancers
Pedrinho	D	Rochester Lancers
Luan Oliveira	M/F	Milwaukee Wave
Carlos Muñoz	M/F	Chicago Soul
Lucas Roque	M/F	Baltimore Blast
William Vanzela	GK	Baltimore Blast
