= Chicago Soul FC =

American indoor soccer team

Chicago Soul
- Full name: Chicago Soul FC
- Founded: 2011
- Dissolved: 2013
- Ground: Sears Centre; Hoffman Estates, Illinois
- Capacity: 8,362
- Chairman: David Mokry
- Coach: Novi Marojević
- League: Major Indoor Soccer League
- 2012–13: 4th MISL
Home colors	Away colors

The Chicago Soul was a professional indoor soccer team that played in the Major Indoor Soccer League. The Soul joined the MISL as an expansion team named the Chicago Kick in 2011, replacing the defunct Chicago Riot. As of September 2013, the club was no longer listed as a MISL team.

== History ==
On September 27, 2011, the MISL announced that the Chicago Kick had failed to secure a suitable venue in time and would not play for the 2011–12 season. The Kick would try to join the league for the 2012–13 season.

On March 11, 2012, the team announced that they secured the Sears Centre as their home venue for the 2012–13 MISL season.

On June 22, 2012, the MISL awarded the Kick franchise to CEO/Owner Dave Mokry.

On July 6, 2012, the team was renamed the Chicago Soul and Narciso "Chicho" Cuevas was hired as head coach.

On September 25, 2012, Cuevas resigned as head coach before the season started, citing family reasons. He was replaced by former Chicago Power player/coach Manny Rojas.

The Soul won their first MISL game on November 2, 2012, defeating the Syracuse Silver Knights 13–8.

On December 11, 2012, Manny Rojas was fired as head coach after a 2–7 start. He was replaced with Novi Marojević.

== Year-by-year ==
Year	League	Logo	Reg. season	Playoffs	Attendance average
2012–13	MISL III		4th MISL, 11–15	Semifinals	1,565
Total			11–15; Win % = .423%	0–2; Win % = .000	1,565

== Players ==
=== Current roster ===
As of November 2, 2012 Note: Flags indicate national team as defined under FIFA eligibility rules; some limited exceptions apply. Players may hold more than one non-FIFA nationality.

No.	Pos.	Nation	Player
1	GK	USA	Nathaniel Sprenkel
2	DF	USA	Sean Summerville
3	DF	USA	William Kletzien
4	DF	USA	Chris Brisson
5	MF	USA	Ephraim Beard
7	FW	USA	Judson McKinney
8	FW	MNE	Bato Radoncic
10	FW	CHI	Carlos “Chile” Farias
11	MF	USA	Matthew Stewart

No.	Pos.	Nation	Player
13	FW	USA	Carlos Graham
14	DF	NGA	Tijani Ayegbusi
16	DF	USA	Roberto Gallo
18	FW	URU	Carlos Muñoz
20	MF	USA	Marco Sullo
22	FW	USA	Christian Meza
23	GK	USA	Jeffrey Richey
33	DF	USA	Aaron Nichols
77	FW	USA	Alexander Megson

Veteran Chicago Sting Play By Play Broadcaster Howard Balson was named to the same post with the Soul. The Public Address Announcer for Soul Home Games at Sears Centre was Les Grobstein, who was replaced by Brett Myhres midway through the season.
