= Chris Brisson =

American soccer player

Personal information
- Full name: Christopher Brisson
- Date of birth: August 11, 1982 (age 44)
- Place of birth: Hugo, Minnesota, United States
- Height: 5 ft 9 in (1.75 m)
- Position: Defender

Team information
- Current team: Chicago Soul FC
- Number: 2

Youth career
- 2001–2004: University of Wisconsin–Milwaukee

Senior career*
Years	Team	Apps	(Gls)
2005–2006	Minnesota Thunder	15	(0)
2006–2009	Chicago Storm (indoor)	66	(13)
2009–2010	Rockford Rampage (indoor)	18	(5)
2010–2011	Chicago Riot (indoor)	9	(3)
- * Club domestic league appearances and goals

Christopher Brisson (born August 11, 1982, in Hugo, Minnesota) is a defender currently playing for the Chicago Soul of the Major Indoor Soccer League.

Brisson attended White Bear Lake High School where he was an All State soccer player, All State football player and a varsity hockey player. He then played soccer at the University of Wisconsin–Milwaukee from 2001 to 2004 where he holds the record for games started and games played. In 2005, he signed with the Minnesota Thunder but was relegated to the reserves for most of the season, seeing time in only two first team games. In 2006, he broke into the first team, playing thirteen games.

On November 3, 2006, Brisson signed with the Chicago Storm of the Major Indoor Soccer League. At the end of the 2007–2008 season, the league collapsed and the Storm moved to the newly established Xtreme Soccer League. At the end of the year the Xtreme Soccer league collapsed. Brisson played over 66 games for the club in three years and recorded 13 goals and 15 assists.

In 2009-2010 Brisson Signed with the Rockford Rampage playing 18 games and scoring 5 goals. After the 2009–2010 season the Rockford Rampage folded. He then signed with the Chicago Riot playing 9 games and scoring 3 goals, missing part of the season with a knee injury. Brisson is currently signed with the newly established Chicago Soul of the MISL.
