= 2009–10 Major Indoor Soccer League season =

Major Indoor Soccer League
- Season: 2009-10
- Average attendance: 3,934

The 2009–10 Major Indoor Soccer League was the sophomore season for the league, and first under the revived MISL banner. It marked the 32nd season of professional Division 1 indoor soccer. The members of the MISL's second season teams were the Baltimore Blast, the Milwaukee Wave, the Monterrey La Raza, the Philadelphia KiXX, and the Rockford Rampage.

The season kicked off on November 13, 2009, with the NISL champion, Baltimore Blast, welcoming the Rockford Rampage. The regular season concluded on March 21, 2010, with the Rockford Rampage hosting Monterrey La Raza.

This year also marks the first season since the KiXX founding that they would play at a new arena, the Liacouras Center, on the campus of Temple University.

Shortly before the season began, the league was re-branded as the Major Indoor Soccer League.

The season for each team was expanded to twenty games, so each team was to play ten home and ten away games. However, due to arena conflicts with Temple University, the Kixx played eight home games and twelve road games.

On March 9, 2010, with an 11-6 win over the Rockford Rampage, the Milwaukee Wave clinched the first playoff spot, continuing the Wave's tradition of making the playoffs every season in a league named MISL. This also marks the fifteenth season since the 1993–1994 NPSL for the Wave to qualify for the playoffs.

== Teams ==
Team	City/Area	Arena
Baltimore Blast	Baltimore, Maryland	1st Mariner Arena
Milwaukee Wave	Milwaukee, Wisconsin	UW–Milwaukee Panther Arena
Monterrey La Raza	Monterrey, Mexico	Arena Monterrey
Philadelphia KiXX	Philadelphia, Pennsylvania	Liacouras Center
Rockford Rampage	Rockford, Illinois	Rockford MetroCentre

== Map of clubs ==
Major Indoor Soccer League clubs

== Results table ==
Abbreviation and Color Key: Baltimore Blast – BAL • Milwaukee Wave – MIL • Monterrey La Raza – MON Philadelphia KiXX – PHI • Rockford Rampage – ROC Win • Loss • Home
Club	Match																			
Club	1	2	3	4	5	6	7	8	9	10	11	12	13	14	15	16	17	18	19	20
Baltimore Blast	ROC	PHI	MON	PHI	ROC	MIL	MON	MIL	MON	MIL	MIL	MON	MON	ROC	PHI	PHI	MON	ROC	PHI	PHI
Baltimore Blast	8-10	19-8	14-13	9-8	10-8	10-12	13-4	9-11	6-7	10-13	6-10	10-25	12-8	9-0	23-14	12-8	12-11	11-8	6-8	12-19
Milwaukee Wave	MON	ROC	MON	PHI	MON	BAL	BAL	MON	ROC	ROC	BAL	MON	BAL	ROC	PHI	ROC	ROC	MON	PHI	PHI
Milwaukee Wave	15-0	8-9	4-15	27-6	19-17	12-10	11-9	10-18	7-10	6-7	13-10	8-15	10-6	5-4	15-10	16-10	13-11	17-12	14-12	12-10
Monterrey La Raza	PHI	MIL	MIL	BAL	ROC	MIL	PHI	BAL	MIL	ROC	BAL	MIL	ROC	BAL	BAL	PHI	BAL	PHI	MIL	ROC
Monterrey La Raza	15-13	0-15	15-4	13-14	4-9	17-19	23-13	4-13	18-10	7-6	15-8	4-2	13-6	25-10	8-12	17-18	11-12	13-20	12-17	18-11
Philadelphia KiXX	MON	BAL	ROC	MIL	BAL	MON	ROC	ROC	ROC	MON	MIL	BAL	BAL	MON	BAL	BAL	ROC	MIL	MIL	BAL
Philadelphia KiXX	13-15	8-19	20-6	6-27	8-9	13-23	23-20	10-9	12-22	8-7	18-17	10-15	14-23	20-13	8-12	8-6	15-34	12-14	10-12	19-12
Rockford Rampage	BAL	MIL	PHI	MON	BAL	PHI	PHI	MIL	MIL	PHI	MON	MON	MIL	PHI	BAL	MIL	MIL	BAL	PHI	MON
Rockford Rampage	10-8	9-8	6-20	9-4	8-10	20-23	9-10	10-7	7-6	22-12	2-4	6-13	4-5	7-8	0-9	10-16	11-13	8-11	34-15	11-18

== Standings ==
Blue indicates bye into the MISL Championship
Green indicates playoff berth clinched

Club		GP	W	L	PF	PA	+/-	Home	Road
1	Milwaukee Wave	20	14	6	242	201	+41	9-3	5-3
2	Baltimore Blast	20	11	9	221	205	+16	7-4	4-5
3	Monterrey La Raza	20	10	10	252	232	+20	7-3	3-7
4	Philadelphia KiXX	20	8	12	255	315	-60	4-3	4-9
5	Rockford Rampage	20	7	13	203	220	-17	3-7	4-6

=== Scoring leaders ===
GP = Games Played, G = Goals, A = Assists, Pts = Points

Player	Team	GP	G	A	Pts
Adauto Neto	Philadelphia Kixx	20	18	28	65
Genoni Martinez	Monterrey LaRaza	20	20	13	62
Carlos Farias	Monterrey LaRaza	20	16	17	53
Pat Morris	Philadelphia Kixx	19	20	3	47
Semir Mesanovic	Philadelphia Kixx	22	17	9	45
Lucio Gonzaga	Baltimore Blast	19	17	6	43
Machel Millwood	Baltimore Blast	16	15	9	40
Giuliano Oliviero	Milwaukee Wave	19	13	10	37

== Player of the Week ==
Week	Date	Player	Pos.	Team
1	11/23/09	Nick Vorberg	GK	Milwaukee Wave
2	11/30/09	Fabinho	D	Rockford Rampage
3	12/07/09	Leo Gibson	F	Philadelphia KiXX
4	12/14/09	Marco Terminesi	F	Milwaukee Wave
5	12/21/09	Machel Millwood	F	Baltimore Blast
6	12/28/09	Max Ferdinand	F	Baltimore Blast
7	01/04/10	Marco Terminesi	F	Milwaukee Wave
8	01/11/10	Pat Morris	F	Philadelphia KiXX
9	01/18/10	Ante Cop	GK	Rockford Rampage
10	01/25/10	Geison Moura	M	Rockford Rampage
11	02/01/10	Giuliano Oliviero	F	Milwaukee Wave
12	02/08/10	Jose Bontti	GK	Monterrey La RaZa
13	02/15/10	Shaun David	F	Monterrey La RaZa
14	02/22/10	Sagu	GK	Baltimore Blast
15	03/01/10	Machel Millwood	F	Baltimore Blast
16	03/08/10	Denison Cabral	F	Baltimore Blast
17	03/15/10	Leo Gibson	F	Rockford Rampage
18	03/22/10	Josh Rife	D	Milwaukee Wave

== Players of the Month ==
November
Players	Pos.	Team
Danny Waltman	GK	Rockford Rampage
Troy Dusosky	D	Milwaukee Wave
Lucio	F	Baltimore Blast
December
Players	Pos.	Team
Marcel Feenstra	GK	Milwaukee Wave
Josh Rife	D	Milwaukee Wave
Marco Terminesi	F	Milwaukee Wave
January
Players	Pos.	Team
Jose Bontti	GK	Monterrey La RaZa
Pat Morris	D	Philadelphia KiXX
Carlos Farias	F	Monterrey La RaZa
February
Players	Pos.	Team
Nick Vorberg	GK	Milwaukee Wave
Pat Morris	D	Philadelphia KiXX
Adauto Neto	F	Philadelphia KiXX
March
Players	Pos.	Team
Nick Vorberg	GK	Milwaukee Wave
Josh Rife	D	Milwaukee Wave
Adauto Neto	F	Philadelphia KiXX

== End of Year Awards ==
Award	Person	Pos.	Team
MVP	Genoni Martinez	D	Monterrey La Raza
Defensive Player of the Year	Genoni Martinez	D	Monterrey La Raza
Goalkeeper of the Year	Nick Vorberg	GK	Milwaukee Wave
Rookie of the Year	Max Ferdinand	F	Baltimore Blast
Coach of the Year	Keith Tozer		Milwaukee Wave
Finals MVP	Carlos Farias	F	Monterrey La Raza

=== All-Rookie Team ===
Person	Pos.	Team
Rod Dyachenko	F	Baltimore Blast
Max Ferdinand	F	Baltimore Blast
Andre Berenzen	M	Rockford Rampage
Angel Hernandez	D	Monterrey La Raza
Angel Garcia	D	Monterrey La Raza

=== 1st-Team All-MISL ===
Person	Pos.	Team
Nick Vorberg	GK	Milwaukee Wave
Genoni Martinez	D	Monterrey La Raza
Pat Morris	D	Philadelphia KiXX
Adauto Neto	F	Philadelphia KiXX
Machel Millwood	F	Baltimore Blast
Carlos Farias	F	Monterry La Raza

=== 2nd-Team All-MISL ===
Person	Pos.	Team
Sagu	GK	Baltimore Blast
Josh Rife	D	Milwaukee Wave
Troy Dusosky	D	Milwaukee Wave
Lucio Gonzaga	F	Baltimore Blast
Giuliano Oliviero	F	Milwaukee Wave
Marco Terminesi	F	Milwaukee Wave

== Playoffs ==
The format for the playoffs is the same as the 2008–09 NISL format. The first place team in the season will get a bye into the finals, while the second and third place teams play a two-game, home-and-home, series, with a third golden goal game taking place at the second place team's home if needed.

=== Semifinals ===
Game 1

March 26, 2010
8:35PM CDT

Baltimore Blast	14–22	Monterrey La Raza

Arena Monterrey
Attendance: 3,875

Game 2

March 29, 2010
7:35PM EDT

Monterrey La Raza	10–8 OT	Baltimore Blast

1st Mariner Arena
Attendance: 5,138

=== Championship ===
April 4, 2010
5:00PM CDT

Monterrey La Raza	12-6	Milwaukee Wave

US Cellular Arena
Attendance: 5,402
