= Fausto Dias =

Brazilian football coach

Personal information
- Full name: Aderson Dias Martins Neto
- Date of birth: 11 September 1981 (age 45)
- Place of birth: Jundiaí, Brazil
- Height: 5 ft 7 in (1.70 m)
- Position: Midfielder

Team information
- Current team: Ituano (head coach)

Youth career
- Paulista

Senior career*
Years	Team	Apps	(Gls)
2000–2001	Flamengo-SP		
2001–2003	Guarulhos		
2003–2004	Ginásio Pinhalense		
2006	XV de Jaú		
2008	Miami FC		
2009	Ginásio Pinhalense		
2010	Bonsucesso		
2010–2011	Sacachispas		
2011–2013	Wichita Wings (indoor)	6	(1)
- Kitsap Pumas
2017	OSA FC		

Managerial career
- 2019–2021: SKA Brasil U17
- 2021: Paulista (assistant)
- 2022: Athletic-MG (assistant)
- 2022: Inter de Limeira (assistant)
- 2022: Athletic-MG U20
- 2023–2024: SKA Brasil U20
- 2024–2025: Paulista
- 2026: Ituano (assistant)
- 2027–: Ituano
- * Club domestic league appearances and goals

Aderson Dias Martins Neto (born 11 September 1981), known as Fausto Dias or just Fausto, is a Brazilian football coach and former player who played as a midfielder. He is the current head coach of Ituano.

== Early life ==
Born in Jundiaí, São Paulo, Fausto earned the nickname by a youth coach named Lázaro at Paulista, as the coach had played with his uncle (also nicknamed Fausto). His father Toninho Montanha also played for the club in the 1980s.

== Playing career ==
After finishing his formation with Paulista, Fausto played for Flamengo-SP, Guarulhos, Ginásio Pinhalense, XV de Jaú, Miami FC, Bonsucesso, Sacachispas, Wichita Wings, Kitsap Pumas and OSA FC.

== Coaching career ==
In 2014, Fausto was an assistant of Taquaritinga's under-20 team, and was also on coaching duties while playing in the United States in the following years. In 2019, he returned to Brazil and was named head coach of the under-17 team of SKA Brasil.

In 2021, Fausto returned to his first club Paulista as an assistant coach, but left the club in September. He later became an assistant of Roger Silva at Athletic-MG and Inter de Limeira, and returned to Athletic in July 2022 as a head coach of the under-20 team.

In October 2022, Fausto returned to SKA Brasil as an under-20 head coach. On 5 February 2024, he returned to his first club Paulista, now named head coach of the first team.

Fausto led Paulista to two consecutive promotions, winning the 2024 Campeonato Paulista Segunda Divisão title, but opted to leave the club on 18 September 2025. On 8 December, he joined Ituano as Mazola Júnior's assistant.

Fausto remained at Ituano even after Mazola left for Paysandu, and was appointed head coach of the club for the upcoming season on 1 November 2026.

== Honours ==
=== Coach ===
Paulista

- Campeonato Paulista Segunda Divisão: 2024
