= FC Reading Revolution =

- Full name: Football Club Reading Revolution
- Nickname: Revolution
- Founded: 2009
- Dissolved: 2014
- Ground: Shirk Stadium; Reading, Pennsylvania
- Capacity: ~2,000
- Owner: (United States) Eric Puls
- Head Coach: (United States) Mike Moyer
- League: National Premier Soccer League
- 2013: 6th, Keystone Conference; Playoffs: DNQ
- Website: http://www.fcrevolution.com/
| Home colors | Away colors |

FC Reading Revolution was an American soccer team based in Reading, Pennsylvania, United States. Founded in 2009, the team played in the National Premier Soccer League (NPSL), a national amateur league at the fourth tier of the American Soccer Pyramid, in the Northeast Keystone Division.

The team played its home games at Shirk Stadium on the campus of Albright College. The team's colors were red, black and silver.

== Notable former players ==
- (United States) Max Ferdinand

== Year-by-year ==
| Year | Division | League | Regular season | Playoffs | Open Cup |
|---|---|---|---|---|---|
| 2009 | 4 | NPSL | 4th, Keystone | Did not qualify | Did not enter |
| 2010 | 4 | NPSL | 4th, Keystone | Did not qualify | Did not enter |
| 2011 | 4 | NPSL | 3rd, Keystone | Did not qualify | Did not enter |
| 2012 | 4 | NPSL | On Hiatus | | |
| 2013 | 4 | NPSL | 6th, Keystone | Did not qualify | Did not enter |
| 2014 | 4 | NPSL | On Hiatus | | |

== Head coaches ==
- (United States) Mike Moyer (2009–present)

== Stadia ==
- Shirk Stadium at Albright College; Reading, Pennsylvania (2009–present)
