= 2008–09 National Indoor Soccer League season =

National Indoor Soccer League
- Season: 2008-09
- Champions: Baltimore Blast
- Goals: 554
- Average goals/game: 12.31
- Top goalscorer: Byron Alvarez (22)
- Biggest home win: 12/27/08 Massachusetts Twisters vs Rockford Rampage (0-43)
- Biggest away win: 2/14/09 Baltimore Blast @ Massachusetts Twisters (37-5)
- Highest scoring: Baltimore Blast (277 points)
- Longest unbeaten run: Baltimore Blast (6)
- Longest losing run: Massachusetts Twisters (14)
- Highest attendance: Baltimore Blast (9,028)
- Lowest attendance: Massachusetts Twisters (378)
- Average attendance: 4,163

The 2008–09 National Indoor Soccer League is the inaugural season for the league and the 31st anniversary of professional Division 1 indoor soccer in the United States. The members of the NISL's first season are the Baltimore Blast, the Massachusetts Twisters, the Monterrey La Raza, the Philadelphia KiXX, and the Rockford Rampage. The Orlando Sharks were supposed to play, but due to scheduling conflicts with the Amway Arena the Twisters took the Sharks' spot for the season.

The league kicked off on November 15, 2008, with the Philadelphia KiXX defeating the Massachusetts Twisters 34-11 and the Baltimore Blast defeating the Rockford Rampage 14–4. The regular season concluded March 29, 2009.

Each team played eighteen games, nine home and nine away. La Raza also played, and won, the Copa América against PASL-Pro and PASL-Premier teams.

== Teams ==
Team	City/Area	Arena
Baltimore Blast	Baltimore, Maryland	1st Mariner Arena
Massachusetts Twisters	West Springfield, Massachusetts	Eastern States Coliseum
Monterrey La Raza	Monterrey, Mexico	Arena Monterrey
Philadelphia KiXX	Philadelphia, Pennsylvania	Wachovia Spectrum
Rockford Rampage	Rockford, Illinois	Rockford MetroCentre

== Map of clubs ==
National Indoor Soccer League clubs

== Final standings ==
Blue indicates bye into the NISL Championship
Green indicates playoff berth clinched

Club		GP	W	L	Pct.	GB	PF	PA	PD	Home	Road
1	Baltimore Blast	18	14	4	.777	-	277	144	+133	8-1	6-3
2	Rockford Rampage	18	10	8	.556	4.0	248	168	+80	7-2	3-6
3	Monterrey La Raza	18	10	8	.556	4.0	275	218	+57	7-2	3-6
4	Philadelphia KiXX	18	10	8	.556	4.0	251	184	+67	7-2	3-6
5	Massachusetts Twisters	18	1	17	.056	13.0	127	464	-337	1-8	0-9

== Playoffs ==
=== Game 1 ===
Friday, 10:35PM EST, April 3, 2009 at Monterrey Arena in Monterrey, Nuevo León

Seed	Team	Q1	Q2	Q3	Q4	Final
2	Rockford Rampage	4	7	0	2	13
3	Monterrey La Raza	6	4	0	6	16

=== Game 2 ===
Sunday, 5:35PM EST, April 5, 2009 at Rockford MetroCentre in Rockford, Illinois

Seed	Team	Q1	Q2	Q3	Q4	Final
3	Monterrey La Raza	0	0	2	4	6
2	Rockford Rampage	3	0	2	4	9

=== Game 3 ===
- (Sudden death golden goal game)

Sunday, April 5, 2009, at Rockford MetroCentre in Rockford, Illinois (Immediately followed game two)

Seed	Team	Q1	Q2	Q3	Q4	Final
3	Monterrey La Raza	0	X	X	X	X
2	Rockford Rampage	2	X	X	X	2

=== Championship ===
Saturday, 7:35PM EST, April 11, 2009 at 1st Mariner Arena in Baltimore, Maryland

Seed	Team	Q1	Q2	Q3	Q4	Final
2	Rockford Rampage	4	4	0	2	10
1	Baltimore Blast	5	4	2	2	13

=== Scoring leaders ===
GP = Games Played, G = Goals, A = Assists, Pts = Points

Player	Team	GP	G	A	Pts
Byron Alvarez	Monterrey La Raza	18	22	11	56
Matthew Stewart	Rockford Rampage	16	22	7	53
Pat Morris	Philadelphia Kixx	18	17	11	51
Ricardinho Cavalcante	Philadelphia Kixx	17	13	22	49
Machel Millwood	Baltimore Blast	15	18	12	48
Hewerthon Moreira	Philadelphia Kixx	9	17	9	47
Mark Ughy	Monterrey La Raza	18	19	9	47
Giuliano Celenza	Baltimore Blast	16	19	7	45
Anthony Maher	Philadelphia Kixx	15	15	13	43
Bato Radoncic	Rockford Rampage	18	17	4	39

== Player of the Week ==
Week	Date	Player	Pos.	Team
1	11/17/08	Hewerton Moreira	F	Philadelphia KiXX
2	12/1/08	Matthew Stewart	M	Rockford Rampage
3	12/8/08	Anthony Maher	F	Philadelphia KiXX
4	12/15/08	Robbie Aristodemo	M	Baltimore Blast
5	12/22/08	Machel Millwood	F	Baltimore Blast
6	12/29/08	Ivan Medina	F	Monterrey La Raza
7	1/5/09	Carlos Garcia	F	Baltimore Blast
8	1/12/09	Ptah Myers	F	Philadelphia KiXX
9	1/19/09	Jose Luiz Birche	D	Monterrey La Raza
10	1/26/09	Hewerton Moreira	F	Philadelphia KiXX
11	2/2/09	Ivan Medina	F	Monterrey La Raza
12	2/9/09	Ricardinho	F	Philadelphia KiXX
13	2/16/09	Adrian Bumbut	F	Baltimore Blast
14	2/23/09	Machel Millwood	F	Baltimore Blast
15	3/2/09	Ricardinho	F	Philadelphia KiXX
17	3/9/09	Jamar Beasley	F	Rockford Rampage
18	3/16/09	Byron Alvarez	F	Monterrey La Raza
19	3/23/09	Jamar Beasley	M	Rockford Rampage
20	3/30/09	Mark Ughy	F	Monterrey La Raza

== Players of the Month ==
December
Players	Pos.	Team
Hewerton Moreira	F	Philadelphia KiXX
Phat Morris	D	Philadelphia KiXX
Sagu	GK	Baltimore Blast
January
Players	Pos.	Team
Bato Radoncic	F	Rockford Rampage
Genoni Martinez	D	Monterrey La RaZa
Peter Pappas	GK	Philadelphia KiXX
February
Players	Pos.	Team
Machel Millwood	F	Baltimore Blast
PJ Wakefield	D	Baltimore Blast
Pete Pappas	GK	Philadelphia KiXX

== End of Year Awards ==
Person	Pos.	Team
MVP	Byron Alvarez	Monterrey La Raza
Defensive Player of the Year	Pat Morris	Philadelphia KiXX
Goalkeeper of the Year	Sagu	Baltimore Blast
Rookie of the Year	Pat Healey	Baltimore Blast
Coach of the Year	Danny Kelly	Baltimore Blast
Finals MVP	Sagu	Baltimore Blast

=== All-Rookie Team ===
Person	Pos.	Team
Pat Healey	F	Baltimore Blast
Adrian Bumbut	F	Baltimore Blast
Joel Busti	M	Monterrey La Raza
Roberto Gallo	D	Rockford Rampage
Kevin Coleman	D	Philadelphia KiXX
Steve Reese	GK	Monterrey La Raza

=== All-NISL 1st Team ===
Person	Pos.	Team
Byron Alvarez	F	Monterrey La Raza
Machel Millwood	F	Baltimore Blast
Ricardinho	M	Philadelphia KiXX
Pat Morris	D	Philadelphia KiXX
Genoni Martinez	D	Monterrey La Raza
Sagu	GK	Baltimore Blast

=== All-NISL 2nd Team ===
Person	Pos.	Team
Hewerthon Moreira	F	Philadelphia Kixx
Bato Radoncic	F	Rockford Rampage
Matthew Stewart	M	Rockford Rampage
P.J. Wakefield	D	Baltimore Blast
Tijani Ayegbusi	D	Rockford Rampage
Sanaldo	GK	Rockford Rampage
