= Mauricio Hernández =

Mauricio Hernández may refer to:

- Mauricio Hernández Norambuena (born 1958), Chilean guerrilla fighter
- Mauricio Hernández (athlete) (born 1961), Mexican athlete
- Mauricio Hernández (footballer) (born 1993), Mexican football player
