= Ibrahim Kante =

Malian footballer (born 1981)

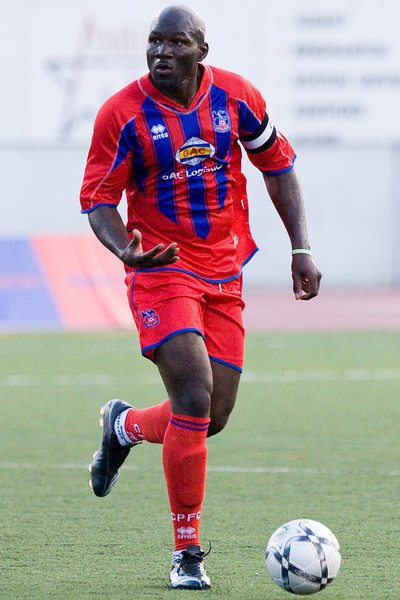

Personal information
- Date of birth: July 20, 1981 (age 45)
- Place of birth: Bamako, Mali
- Height: 6 ft 3 in (1.91 m)
- Positions: Left back; center back; forward

Senior career*
Years	Team	Apps	(Gls)
2003	New England Revolution	2	(0)
2003–2004	Baltimore Blast (indoor)	5	(1)
2004	Milwaukee Wave United	20	(0)
2004–2005	St. Louis Steamers (indoor)	19	(11)
2005	Kansas City Comets (indoor)	14	(9)
2005–2006	Baltimore Blast (indoor)	14	(2)
2007–2008	Crystal Palace Baltimore	25	(3)
2007–2008	New Jersey Ironmen (indoor)	11	(2)
2009	Cleveland City Stars	21	(1)
2008–2010	Rockford Rampage (indoor)	30	(8)
2010	Monterrey La Raza (indoor)	7	(3)
2010–2011	Omaha Vipers (indoor)	10	(0)
2012–2013	Missouri Comets (indoor)	4	(0)
- * Club domestic league appearances and goals as of 22 October 2009

Ibrahim Kanté (born July 20, 1981, in Bamako) is a Malian soccer player, a member of the Missouri Comets, a MISL (Major Indoor Soccer League) team.

== Career ==
Kante made two appearances as a rookie in 2003 with New England Revolution of Major League Soccer, before moving on to Milwaukee Wave United of the USL A-League in 2004.

He played several seasons of indoor soccer with Baltimore Blast, the Kansas City Comets and the St. Louis Steamers of the Major Indoor Soccer League before signing with Crystal Palace Baltimore of the USL Second Division in 2007. He scored Baltimore's first ever professional goal, a thunderbolt free kick from the edge of the box in a pre-season friendly.

Kante signed to play with Cleveland City Stars in their inaugural season in the USL First Division on April 20, 2009.

2010–2011 saw him battle through an injury-plagued season with the Omaha Vipers, only starting ten games. Fully recovered, he signed with the Missouri Comets.

== Career statistics ==
(correct as of 27 September 2008)

Club	Season	League			Cup			Play-Offs			Total		
Club	Season	Apps	Goals	Assists	Apps	Goals	Assists	Apps	Goals	Assists	Apps	Goals	Assists
New England Revolution	2003	2	0	?	?	?	?	?	?	?	2	0	?
Total	2003	2	0	?	?	?	?	?	?	?	2	0	?
Milwaukee Wave United	2004	20	0	?	?	?	?	?	?	?	20	0	?
Total	2004	20	0	?	?	?	?	?	?	?	20	0	?
Crystal Palace Baltimore	2007	12	1	1	?	0	0	-	-	-	12	1	1
Crystal Palace Baltimore	2008	13	2	0	3	0	0	1	0	0	16	2	0
Total	2007–present	25	3	1	3	0	0	1	0	0	29	3	1
Career Total	2003–present	47	3	1	3	0	0	1	0	0	51	3	1
