= Miguel Ferrer (footballer) =

Cuban footballer

Personal information
- Full name: Miguel Ferrer
- Date of birth: March 28, 1987 (age 39)
- Place of birth: Cuba
- Height: 5 ft 10 in (1.78 m)
- Position: Midfielder

College career
| Years | Team | Apps | (Gls) |
| 2005–2009 | UNC Pembroke Braves | | |

Senior career*
| Years | Team | Apps | (Gls) |
| 2008 | SG Oppenweiler | | |
| 2010–2012 | Charlotte Eagles | 57 | (3) |
| 2011–2012 | Norfolk SharX (indoor) | 25 | (18) |
| 2012–2013 | Wichita Wings (indoor) | 27 | (11) |
- * Club domestic league appearances and goals as of May 11, 2020

Miguel Ferrer (born March 28, 1987) is a Cuban footballer who last played for the Wichita Wings in the Major Indoor Soccer League.

== Career ==
=== College ===
Ferrer grew up in Miami, Florida, played college soccer at the University of North Carolina at Pembroke, where he received all-conference, all-region, and all-American honors as a junior, and all-conference and all-region honors as a senior. In 2008, Ferrer studied in Germany and played a half season for the semi-pro soccer club SG Oppenweiler.

=== Professional ===
Undrafted by Major League Soccer out of college, Ferrer signed with Charlotte Eagles on March 8, 2010, after a good showing at their invitational-only tryout. He made his professional debut on May 1, 2010, in Charlotte's 2-1 loss against rival Charleston Battery at Charleston's Blackbaud Stadium.

In October 2011, Ferrer joined MISL side Norfolk SharX for the indoor season and he moved to Wichita Wings the following season.
