= Marojević =

Marojević is a Croatian, Serbian and Montenegrin surname. It may refer to:

- Zoran Marojević (born 1942) Yugoslav Serbian former basketball player
- Igor Marojević (born 1968) Serbian writer
- Novi Marojević (born 1973) Montenegrin footballer
