= Sweat equity =

Work that builds value, not for pay

Sweat equity refers to work one does to build up value without a salary. This ownership interest, or increase in value, is created as a direct result of hard work by the owner. For example, homeowners who renovate or repair their house themselves are investing in sweat equity that increases the value of their home. Or it could be a non-monetary benefit that a company's stakeholders give in labour and time, rather than a monetary contribution, that benefit the company. In some cases, sweat equity may be rewarded in the form of sweat equity shares. These are shares given out by a company in exchange for labour and time rather than a monetary amount.

== In real estate ==
Sweat equity has an application in business real estate, for example, where the owners put in effort and toil to build the business, in real estate where owners can perform D.I.Y. improvements and increase the value of the real estate, and in other areas such as an auto owner putting in their own effort and toil to increase the value of the vehicle.

The term sweat equity explains the fact that value added to someone's own house by unpaid work results in measurable market rate value increase in house price. The more labor applied to the home, and the greater the resultant increase in value, the more sweat equity has been used. The concept of sweat equity was first employed in the United States by the American Friends Service Committee in the Penn Craft self-help housing project beginning in 1937. The AFSC began using the term in the 1950s when helping migrant farmers in California to build their own homes. It is perhaps most popularly associated today with a successful model used by Habitat for Humanity, in which families who would otherwise be unable to purchase a home contribute sweat equity hours to the construction of their own home or the homes of other Habitat for Humanity partner families, or by volunteering to assist the organization in other ways. Once living in their new home, the family then make interest-free mortgage payments into a revolving fund which then provides capital to build homes for other families.

== In U.S. private business ==
Private businesses in the U.S. make up 60% of yearly business net income. Recent data has shown the sweat equity in the private business sector equals 1.2 times the U.S. GDP. Theories have been put out to the public to say that lowering income tax rates on private businesses is significantly understated when considering smaller firms' sweat equity effects.

== Sweat equity shares ==
Sweat equity shares are discounted shares issued by a company to its employees or directors. The shares are given in exchange for a value-add by an employee or director. Sweat equity shares are essential when creating a startup with low amounts of funding.

Sweat equity shares can be used as motivation for the startup's employees and will create a more level playing field against large corporations. In a startup company formed as a corporation, employees may receive stock or stock options, becoming part-owners of the firm, in exchange for accepting salaries that are below their respective market values (this includes zero wages). The term used to refer to a form of compensation by businesses to their owners or employees.

The term is sometimes used to describe the efforts put into a start-up company by the founders in exchange for ownership shares of the company. This concept, also called "stock for services" and sometimes "equity compensation" or "sweat equity," can also be seen when startup companies use their shares of stock to entice service providers to provide necessary corporate services in exchange for a discount or for deferring service fees until a later date; see, e.g., "Idea Makers and Idea Brokers in High Technology Entrepreneurship" by Todd L. Juneau et al., Greenwood Press, 2003, which describes equity for service programs involving patent lawyers and securities lawyers who specialize in start-up companies as clients. The “Slicing Pie” model, outlined in Mike Moyer's 2012 book Slicing Pie: Funding Your Company Without Funds, outlines a formula based entirely on sweat equity by observing the relative value of each person's unpaid fair market compensation and reimbursement.

== See also ==
- To each according to his contribution
