= Ryan Junge =

American soccer player

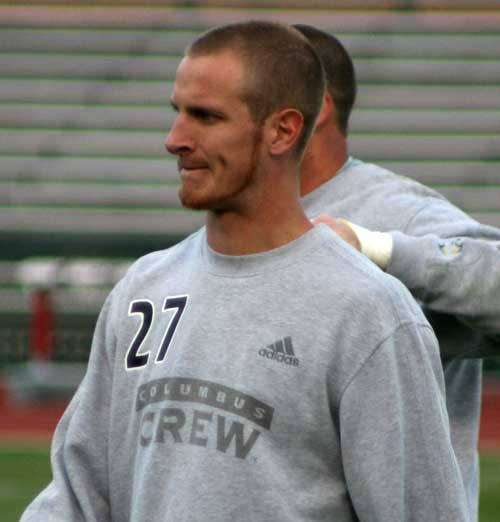

Personal information
- Full name: Ryan Junge
- Date of birth: September 7, 1984 (age 42)
- Place of birth: Omaha, Nebraska, U.S.
- Height: 6 ft 1 in (1.85 m)
- Position: Defender

Team information
- Current team: Missouri Comets
- Number: 27

College career
Years	Team	Apps	(Gls)
2003	Hastings Broncos		
2004–2006	Creighton Bluejays	64	(7)

Senior career*
Years	Team	Apps	(Gls)
2007	Cleveland City Stars	4	(0)
2007–2009	Columbus Crew	6	(0)
2010–2011	Omaha Vipers (indoor)	20	(8)
2011–2015	Missouri Comets (indoor)	48	(16)
- * Club domestic league appearances and goals as of 19 March 2013

Ryan Junge (born September 7, 1984) is an American retired soccer player who last played for the Missouri Comets of the MISL.

Junge played one year of collegiate soccer at Hastings College before transferring to Creighton University. He started 79 of 83 games, where he scored 8 goals and assisted on 14 more. He was 2 time all conference, 1st team all region and strength and conditioning All American while at Creighton.

He was drafted in the MLS's second round, 15th overall, by the Columbus Crew in the 2007 MLS Supplemental Draft and appeared in 13 matches, 3 of them starts in three seasons with the Black & Gold. Junge was a part of the team that won the 2008 MLS Championship.

In September 2010, Junge signed with the Omaha Vipers of the MISL. Junge led all rookies in scoring with 21pts. He was named to the 2010-2011 All MISL Rookie team.
