= Machel Millwood =

Jamaican soccer player (born 1979)

Personal information
- Full name: Machel Millwood
- Date of birth: 28 June 1979 (age 47)
- Place of birth: Trelawny Parish, Jamaica
- Height: 6 ft 2 in (1.88 m)
- Position: Forward

College career
Years	Team	Apps	(Gls)
1999–2000	Prince George's Owls		
2001–2002	Towson Tigers		

Senior career*
Years	Team	Apps	(Gls)
2003–2004	Syracuse Salty Dogs	45	(16)
2004–2013	Baltimore Blast (indoor)	182	(174)
2005–2008	Atlanta Silverbacks	42	(18)
2009–2010	Crystal Palace Baltimore	9	(1)
2013–2014	Syracuse Silver Knights (indoor)	20	(18)

Managerial career
- 2013–2014: Prince George's Owls (assistant)
- 2015–2016: Prince George's Owls
- * Club domestic league appearances and goals as of 24 January 2019

Machel Millwood (born 28 June 1979) is a Jamaican former association football player who most recently played for Crystal Palace Baltimore in the USSF Second Division and the Syracuse Silver Knights of the Major Indoor Soccer League. Millwood is best known for his career in the MISL, playing for championship teams with the Baltimore Blast and helping the 2013–2014 Syracuse Silver Knights make the MISL playoffs.

== Career ==
=== College ===
Born in Jamaica, Millwood's family moved to Maryland when he was still a child. He attended Parkdale High School, and played two years of college soccer at Prince George's Community College before transferring to Towson University as a junior. At Towson, Millwood was an All-American Honorable Mention in 2002, was named to the Colonial Athletic Association First Team All-Conference and the CAA All-Tournament Team in 2002, to the American East Conference All-League and to the All-South Atlantic Region team in 2001 and 2002.

He ranks in the top 10 in Towson soccer history in six categories, and graduated with a bachelor's degree in business and economics.

=== Professional ===
Millwood signed with the Syracuse Salty Dogs of the USL A-League in 2003, and played in 45 matches, notching 12 goals and six assists for 30 points in his two seasons in Syracuse. In 2004, he signed a 15-day contract with the Baltimore Blast of the Major Indoor Soccer League, eventually signing a permanent contract for the 2004–2005 season, and continued to play for the Blast through the end of the 2012-13 Season, .

In the summer of 2005 Millwood spent the summer with the Atlanta Silverbacks of the USL First Division, spending the next two seasons with the Silverbacks scoring 6 goals and adding 7 assists. On 28 May 2009, he signed for Crystal Palace Baltimore of the USL Second Division.

It was announced on 14 November 2013 that Millwood had joined the Syracuse Silver Knights, joining former teammate and now coach in Syracuse, Tommy Tanner. Millwood was named MISL player of the week for the 14th week of the MISL 2013–2014 season on Tuesday, 18 February 2014, and is considered one of the most skilled players in the MISL.

=== International ===
Millwood has seen playing time with Jamaica's U-17 National Team, but has never been called up at senior level.

=== Coaching ===
In 2013, Millwood joined the staff of his alma mater, Prince George's Community College. Millwood was elevated to head coach in 2015.

== Career statistics ==
(correct as of 29 September 2009)

Club	Season	League			Cup			Play-Offs			Total		
Club	Season	Apps	Goals	Assists	Apps	Goals	Assists	Apps	Goals	Assists	Apps	Goals	Assists
Syracuse	2003	23	6	?	?	?	?	?	?	?	23	6	?
Syracuse	2004	22	6	?	?	?	?	?	?	?	22	6	?
Total	2003–2004	45	12	?	?	?	?	?	?	?	45	12	?
Atlanta	2005	10	0	?	?	?	?	?	?	?	10	0	?
Atlanta	2006	21	6	?	?	?	?	?	?	?	21	6	?
Total	2005–2006	31	6	?	?	?	?	?	?	?	31	6	?
Crystal Palace Baltimore	2009	9	1	2	1	0	0	0	0	0	10	1	2
Total	2009–present	9	1	2	1	0	0	0	0	0	10	1	2
Career Total	2003–present	85	19	2	1	0	0	?	?	?	86	19	2
