= Hugo, Minnesota =

City in Minnesota, United States

Hugo
- City
- Location of the city of Hugo within Washington County, Minnesota
- Coordinates: 45°9′8″N 92°57′48″W
- Country: United States
- State: Minnesota
- County: Washington

Government
  - Mayor: Tom Weidt

Area
  - Total: 36.03 sq mi (93.33 km^{2})
  - Land: 33.46 sq mi (86.66 km^{2})
  - Water: 2.58 sq mi (6.67 km^{2})
- Elevation: 929 ft (283 m)

Population (2020)
  - Total: 15,766
  - Density: 471.2/sq mi (181.92/km^{2})
- Time zone: UTC-6 (Central (CST))
  - Summer (DST): UTC-5 (CDT)
- ZIP code: 55038
- Area code: 651
- FIPS code: 27-30392
- GNIS feature ID: 2394440
- Website: City of Hugo

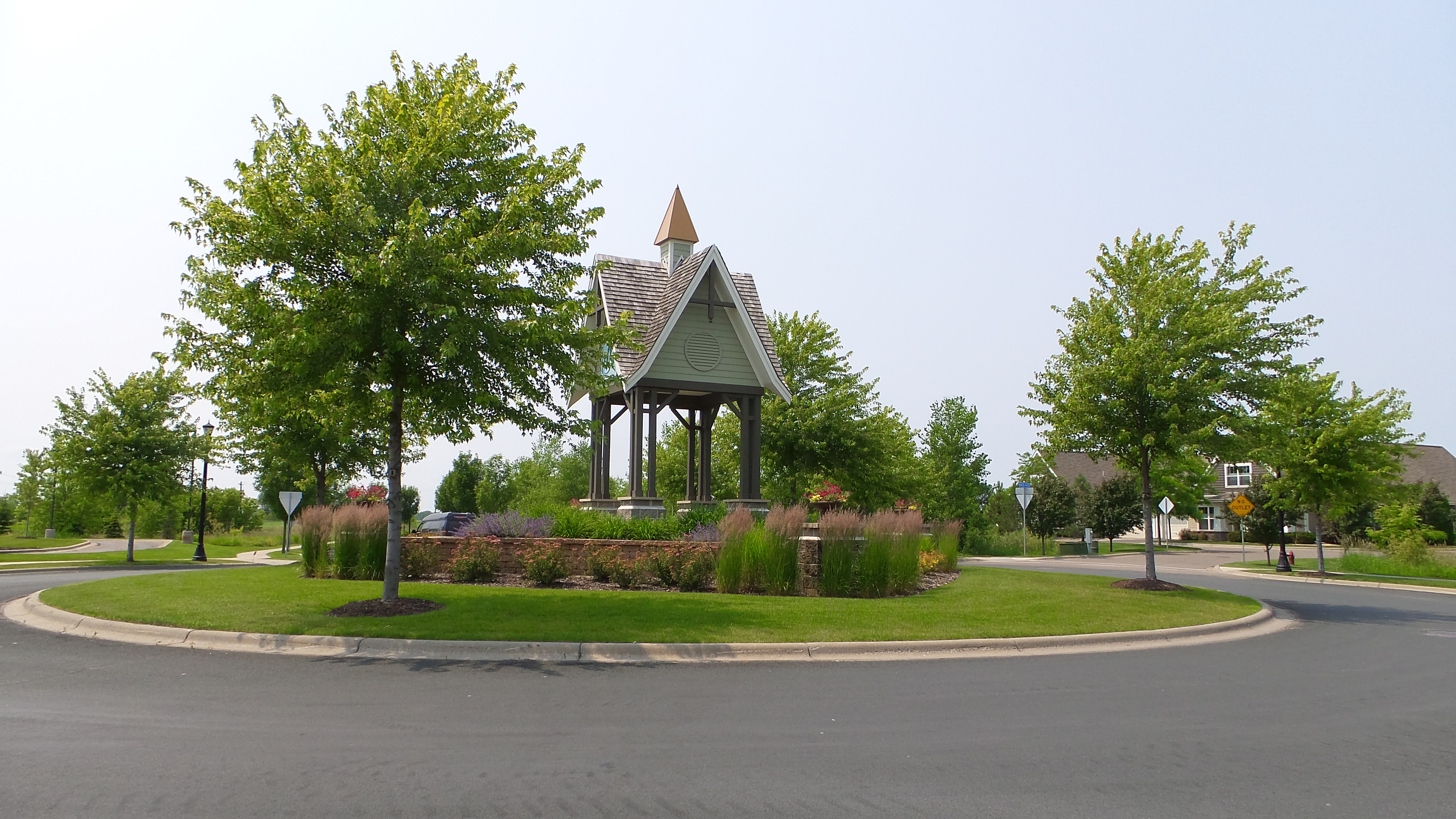

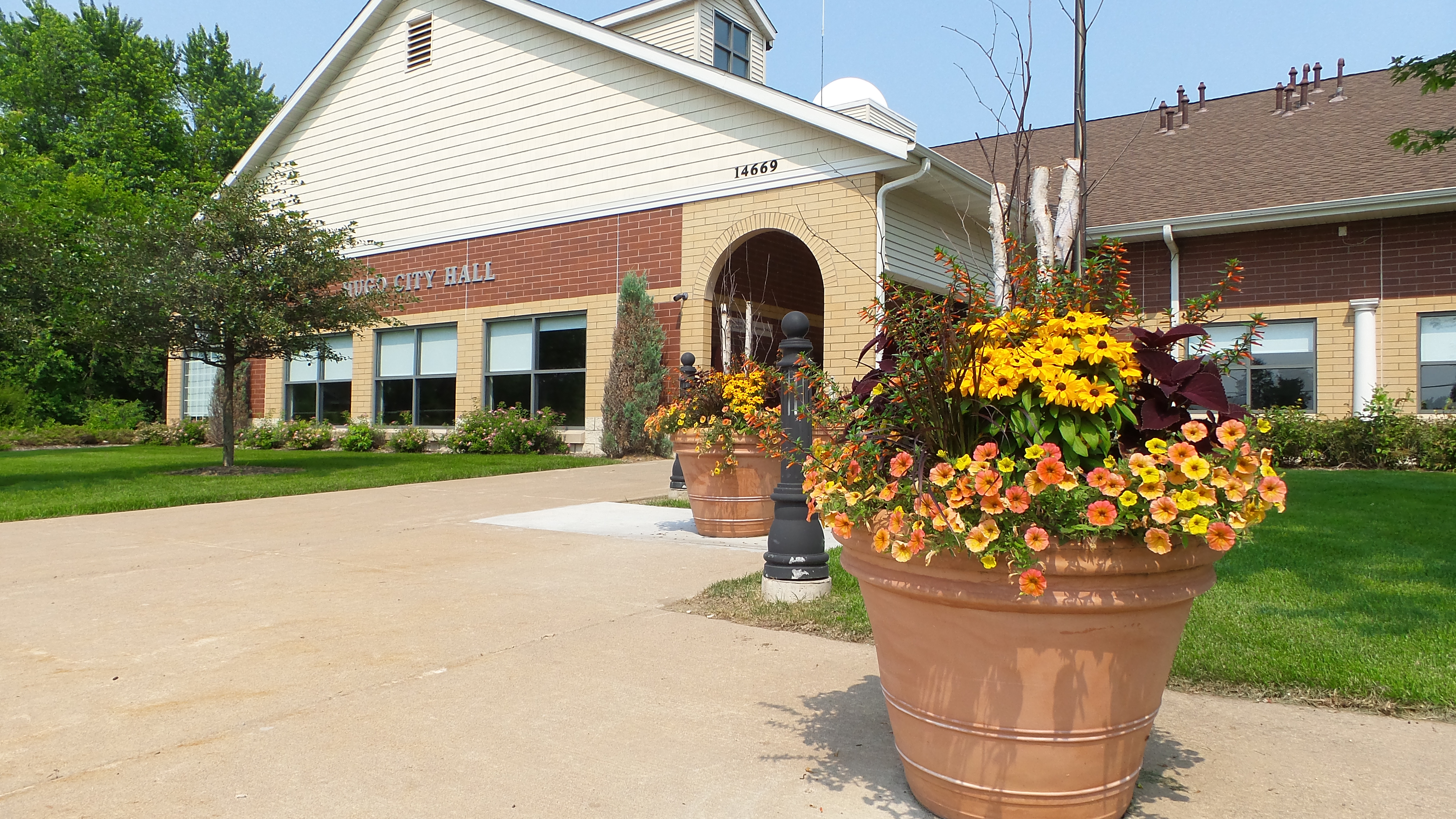

Hugo (/ˈhjuːɡoʊ/ HEW-goh) is a city 18 miles (29 km) north of downtown Saint Paul in Washington County in the U.S. state of Minnesota. The population was 15,766 at the 2020 census. The city lies north of White Bear Lake on the border of the metropolitan boundary. Hugo and nearby suburbs comprise the northeast portion of Minneapolis-St. Paul, the sixteenth largest metropolitan area in the United States.

The city's largest lake, Oneka Lake, is named for the Dakota word "onakan," which means "to strike or knock off," rice into a canoe. Just south is Rice Lake where Mdewakanton Dakota from Mendota gathered wild rice.

== History ==
Originally settled by French Canadians, Hugo early on established itself as a refueling station for the Lake Superior and Mississippi Railroad (later the Northern Pacific Railway). Located in Oneka township, the community was first named Centerville Station and finally Hugo. The naming of Hugo is still uncertain. Local histories point to the French novelist, Victor Hugo, as its namesake due to the abundance of French-Canadian settlers in the area and the writer's tremendous popularity at the time. Duluth mayor, Trevanion William Hugo, is also said to have given Hugo its name; however, the name "Hugo" was already being used by the village post office before Trevanion Hugo emigrated from Canada. The Oneka Township surrounding the area was also named by the French-Canadians settling the area. Oneka was derived from the Dakota word "onakan" meaning to strike or knock off rice into a canoe. The village incorporated in 1906 and was officially incorporated as a city in 1972. After 2000, Hugo had absorbed significant suburban growth and development to become the thriving city it is today.

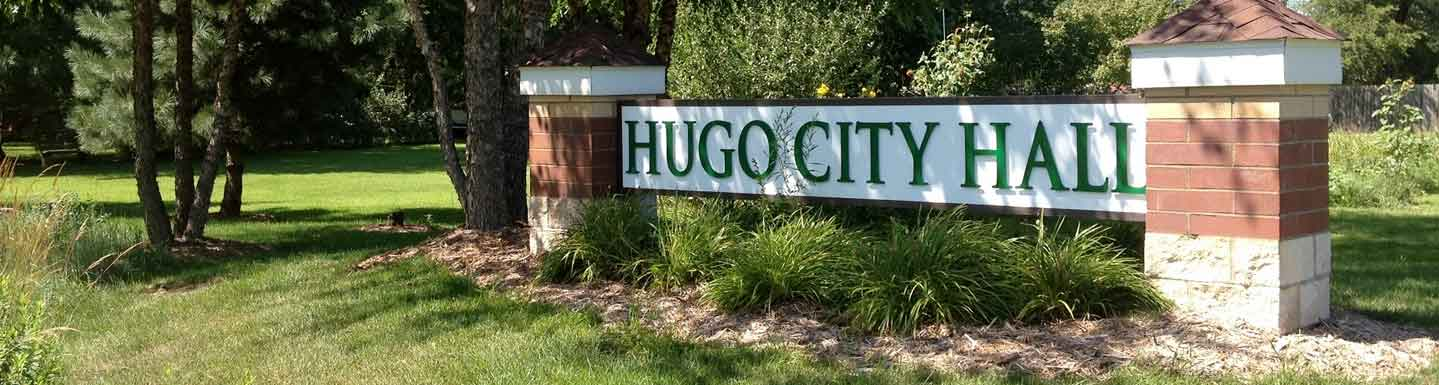
Hugo, MN

== Geography ==
According to the United States Census Bureau, the city has a total area of 36.02 square miles (93.29 km^{2}); 33.45 square miles (86.64 km^{2}) is land and 2.57 square miles (6.66 km^{2}) is water.

The city is bound by Elmcrest Avenue North on its west, Keystone Avenue North on its east, 180th Street North on its north, and 120th Street North on its south. A major route within the city is U.S. Highway 61, which runs north–south. Interstate 35E is not within the city limits, but is heavily used by Hugo residents. It is located just west of Hugo. Washington County Road 8/Anoka County Road 14 connects U.S. 61 to Interstate 35E.

== Demographics ==
Historical population
Census	Pop.	Note	%±
1910	204		—
1920	246		20.6%
1930	303		23.2%
1940	348		14.9%
1950	440		26.4%
1960	538		22.3%
1970	751		39.6%
1980	3,771		402.1%
1990	4,417		17.1%
2000	6,363		44.1%
2010	13,332		109.5%
2020	15,766		18.3%
U.S. Decennial Census

=== 2020 census ===
As of the 2020 census, Hugo had a population of 15,766. The median age was 39.0 years. 26.1% of residents were under the age of 18 and 13.9% of residents were 65 years of age or older. For every 100 females there were 97.0 males, and for every 100 females age 18 and over there were 94.0 males age 18 and over.

82.6% of residents lived in urban areas, while 17.4% lived in rural areas.

There were 5,939 households in Hugo, of which 35.7% had children under the age of 18 living in them. Of all households, 58.5% were married-couple households, 13.6% were households with a male householder and no spouse or partner present, and 21.5% were households with a female householder and no spouse or partner present. About 21.9% of all households were made up of individuals and 8.7% had someone living alone who was 65 years of age or older.

There were 6,148 housing units, of which 3.4% were vacant. The homeowner vacancy rate was 1.1% and the rental vacancy rate was 4.9%.

Racial composition as of the 2020 census
Race	Number	Percent
White	13,837	87.8%
Black or African American	307	1.9%
American Indian and Alaska Native	67	0.4%
Asian	527	3.3%
Native Hawaiian and Other Pacific Islander	2	0.0%
Some other race	196	1.2%
Two or more races	830	5.3%
Hispanic or Latino (of any race)	538	3.4%

=== 2010 census ===
At the 2010 census there were 13,332 people in 4,990 households, including 3,704 families, in the city. The population density was 398.6 inhabitants per square mile (153.9/km^{2}). There were 5,189 housing units at an average density of 155.1 per square mile (59.9/km^{2}). The racial makeup of the city was 94.2% White, 0.7% African American, 0.3% Native American, 3.1% Asian, 0.6% from other races, and 1.0% from two or more races. Hispanic or Latino of any race were 2.2%.

Of the 4,990 households 40.4% had children under the age of 18 living with them, 60.8% were married couples living together, 9.2% had a female householder with no husband present, 4.2% had a male householder with no wife present, and 25.8% were non-families. 19.6% of households were one person and 3.8% were one person aged 65 or older. The average household size was 2.67 and the average family size was 3.09.

The median age was 33.7 years. 27.9% of residents were under the age of 18; 6.3% were between the ages of 18 and 24; 33.9% were from 25 to 44; 24.2% were from 45 to 64; and 7.8% were 65 or older. The gender makeup of the city was 49.2% male and 50.8% female.

=== 2000 census ===
At the 2000 census there were 6,363 people in 2,125 households, including 1,742 families, in the city. The population density was 187.2 inhabitants per square mile (72.3/km^{2}). There were 2,174 housing units at an average density of 64.0 per square mile (24.7/km^{2}). The racial makeup of the city was 97.76% White, 0.18% African American, 0.42% Native American, 1.03% Asian, 0.05% Pacific Islander, 0.20% from other races, and 0.53% from two or more races. Hispanic or Latino of any race were 1.05%.

Of the 2,125 households 45.1% had children under the age of 18 living with them, 71.5% were married couples living together, 6.7% had a female householder with no husband present, and 18.0% were non-families. 12.7% of households were one person and 2.6% were one person aged 65 or older. The average household size was 2.99 and the average family size was 3.30.

The age distribution was 31.3% under the age of 18, 6.5% from 18 to 24, 34.6% from 25 to 44, 22.7% from 45 to 64, and 4.9% 65 or older. The median age was 34 years. For every 100 females, there were 104.7 males. For every 100 females age 18 and over, there were 105.6 males.

The median household income was $63,450 and the median family income was $65,222. Males had a median income of $44,069 versus $31,110 for females. The per capita income for the city was $24,334. About 1.4% of families and 1.5% of the population were below the poverty line, including 0.9% of those under age 18 and 6.1% of those age 65 or over.

== Notable people ==
- Chris Brisson (born 1982) – soccer player
- Bob Kroll (born 1956) – Minneapolis Police Department lieutenant and president of the Police Officers Federation of Minneapolis

== See also ==
- Withrow, Minnesota
