= Geison Moura =

Brazilian footballer (born 1986)

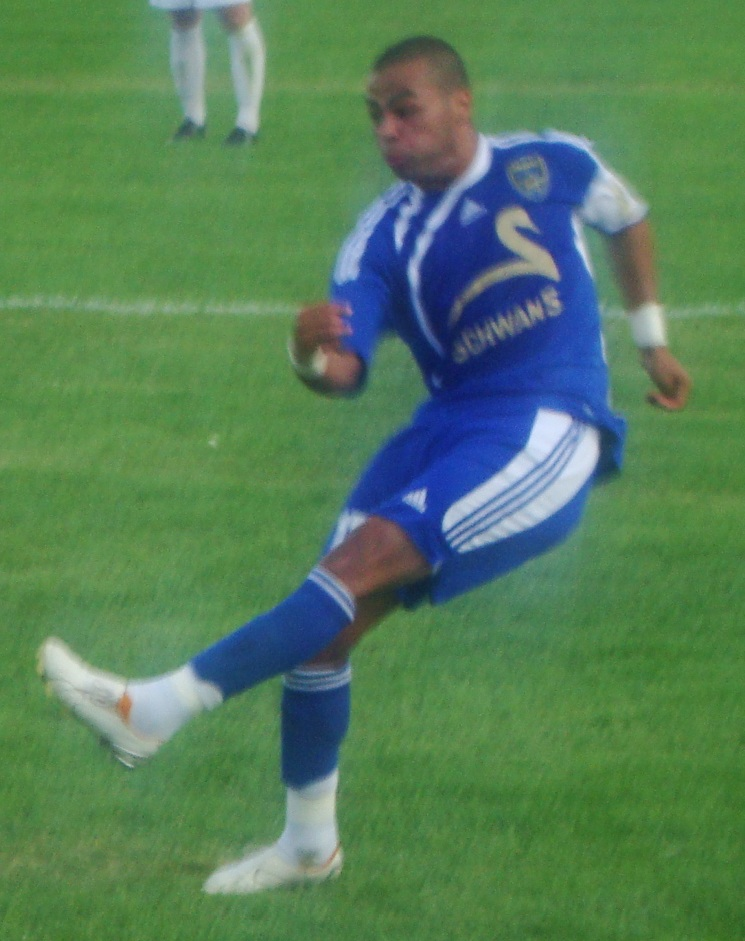

Personal information
- Date of birth: July 16, 1986 (age 40)
- Place of birth: São Caetano do Sul, Brazil
- Height: 1.80 m (5 ft 11 in)
- Position: Striker

Senior career*
Years	Team	Apps	(Gls)
2004	Bahia		
2005–2006	Portuguesa Santista		
2007	New Jersey Ironmen (indoor)	9	(2)
2008–2010	Rockford Rampage (indoor)	18	(12)
2010–2011	NSC Minnesota Stars	13	(2)
2010–2012	Missouri Comets (indoor)	40	(48)
2012–2013	Minnesota United FC	8	(1)
2013–2014	Hougang United FC	27	(21)
2015	Minnesota United FC	7	(0)
2016	Fort Lauderdale Strikers	24	(3)
Total		146	(89)
- * Club domestic league appearances and goals

Geison Moura (born July 16, 1986) is a Brazilian-American former footballer who played as a forward.

== Career ==
=== Brazil ===
Moura signed his first professional contract in 2004 when he joined Bahia, then of the Brazilian second division. In 2005, he returned home to the São Paulo state to join Portuguesa Santista of the third division.

=== United States ===
Moura moved to the United States in 2007 to join the New Jersey Ironmen of the Major Indoor Soccer League. He played nine games for the Ironmen, scoring two goals, before joining the Rockford Rampage for the 2008-2009 season. He was signed by the NSC Minnesota Stars of the USSF Division 2 Professional League in May 2010, and made his debut for the team on May 22, 2010 in a game against Miami FC.

Moura was released by NSC Minnesota on November 29, 2011. Moura rejoined Minnesota United FC in 2012 and was released at the end of the 2013 NASL Spring Championship.

=== Singapore ===
Moura joined Hougang United FC in Singapore's S.League in December 2013. He was the second top scorer of the 2014 S.League with twenty-one goals while playing for the club.

=== United States ===
Moura rejoined Minnesota United FC in April 2015. He retired from football on 1 January 2017.

== Personal life ==
Moura was born on 16 July 1986. Born in São Caetano do Sul, Brazil, he is a native of the city. He has been married to an American woman.

== Business ventures ==
=== Stimulus Athletic ===
Stimulus Athletic was launched in 2016 out of Minneapolis, Minnesota. Geison Moura founded the brand after his playing career.

==== Clubs ====
- Minneapolis City SC (2018-present) - USL League Two

==== National teams ====
- Anguilla national football team (2021-present)
- Puerto Rico national football team (2026-present)

== Honours ==
=== Club ===
NSC Minnesota Stars

- North American Soccer League (1): 2011

=== Individual ===
- Major Indoor Soccer League Most Valuable Player Award: 2011-12
