= Omaha Vipers =

US soccer team

- Founded: 2010
- Dissolved: 2011
- Ground: Omaha Civic Auditorium
- Capacity: 9,300
- Owners: Manuel Alferes & Sergio Robles
- General Manager: Sam Coughlin
- Head Coach: (Argentina) Marcelo Fontana
- League: MISL

The Omaha Vipers were a professional indoor soccer team that began play in the MISL in the 2010–11 season. Based in Omaha, Nebraska, the Vipers played their home games at the Omaha Civic Auditorium. Following their inaugural season, the Vipers had planned moving from Major Indoor Soccer League to the Professional Arena Soccer League for the 2011–12 season and paid the league's $25,000 franchise fee, but the team folded in October 2011 when they were unable to secure an arena for the upcoming season.

== Year-by-year ==
Year	League	Logo	Reg. season	Playoffs	Attendance average
2010-11	MISL III		4th MISL, 7-13	Did not qualify	2,708
Total			7-13; Win % = .350%	N/A; Win % = N/A	2,708

== Final squad ==
as of 16 November 2010

Note: Flags indicate national team as defined under FIFA eligibility rules; some limited exceptions apply. Players may hold more than one non-FIFA nationality.

No.	Pos.	Nation	Player
2	DF	USA	Aaron Polak
3	DF	USA	Chris Brunt
4	DF	MLI	Ibrahim Kante
5	DF	BRA	Aurinei Parisotto
6	FW	COL	Johnny Torres
8	MF	MEX	Victor Quiroz
9	FW	BRA	Frederico Moojen
10	FW	USA	Nick Krueger
11	MF	BRA	Andre Gustavo Sandri Silva

No.	Pos.	Nation	Player
12	GK	USA	Joshua Miller
13	DF	USA	Eduardo 'Lalo' Suarez
14	DF	NGA	Tijani Ayegbusi
19	MF	MEX	Mauricio Curiel Hernandez
20	FW	ARG	Marcelo Fontana
24	FW	USA	Shaun David
27	DF	USA	Ryan Junge
15	DF	BRA	Fabio Ribeiro
91	DF	IRQ	Toshentino Cienfuego
