= Novi Marojević =

Montenegrin footballer

Personal information
- Full name: Novica Marojević
- Date of birth: 11 April 1973 (age 53)
- Place of birth: Nikšić, Montenegro, Yugoslavia
- Height: 6 ft 1 in (1.85 m)
- Position: Midfielder

Team information
- Current team: Indiana Elite FC (coach)

Senior career*
Years	Team	Apps	(Gls)
- Sutjeska
- Radnički Niš
	Partizan	0	(0)
- Voždovac
- Čelik Nikšić
1996-1999	Kansas City Attack (indoor)		
1997	Rochester Raging Rhinos		
1998	Mississippi Beach Kings (indoor)		
2004–2006	Chicago Storm (indoor)		
2006–2007	Detroit Ignition (indoor)		(12)
2007-2008	Rockford Rampage (indoor)		
2010-2011	Chicago Riot (indoor)		
2015–	FK Republika Srpska (indoor)		

Managerial career
- 2010-2011: Chicago Riot (indoor, player/asst manager)
- 2012-2013: Chicago Soul (indoor)
- * Club domestic league appearances and goals

Novica Marojević (Serbian Cyrillic: Нови Маројевић; born 11 April 1973) is a Montenegrin former football player and coach who played for various clubs in Yugoslavia and the United States.

== Playing career ==
During his career in the United States, Novi played as a midfielder for several teams, including : Rochester Raging Rhinos, Kansas City Attack, Chicago Storm, Chicago Riot and Detroit Ignition.

== Managerial career ==
In December 2012 Novi took over as the coach of Chicago Soul. He currently coaches one of the youth soccer teams in the Midwest, Indiana Elite in Crown Point, Indiana. In 2017, Novi started the construction of a 1.5 million dollar soccer complex project in Portage. In 2021, Indiana Elite was one of the 3 teams to join the ECNL league for the 2021-2022 season. Between 2004 and 2006, Novi coached Christian Pulisic.

== Personal life ==
Born in Nikšić on 11 April 1973, Novi settled in the United States in 1996. He is currently married to Jadranka Marojević, with whom he shares a son named Marko.
