= Luan Oliveira =

Brazilian street skateboarder

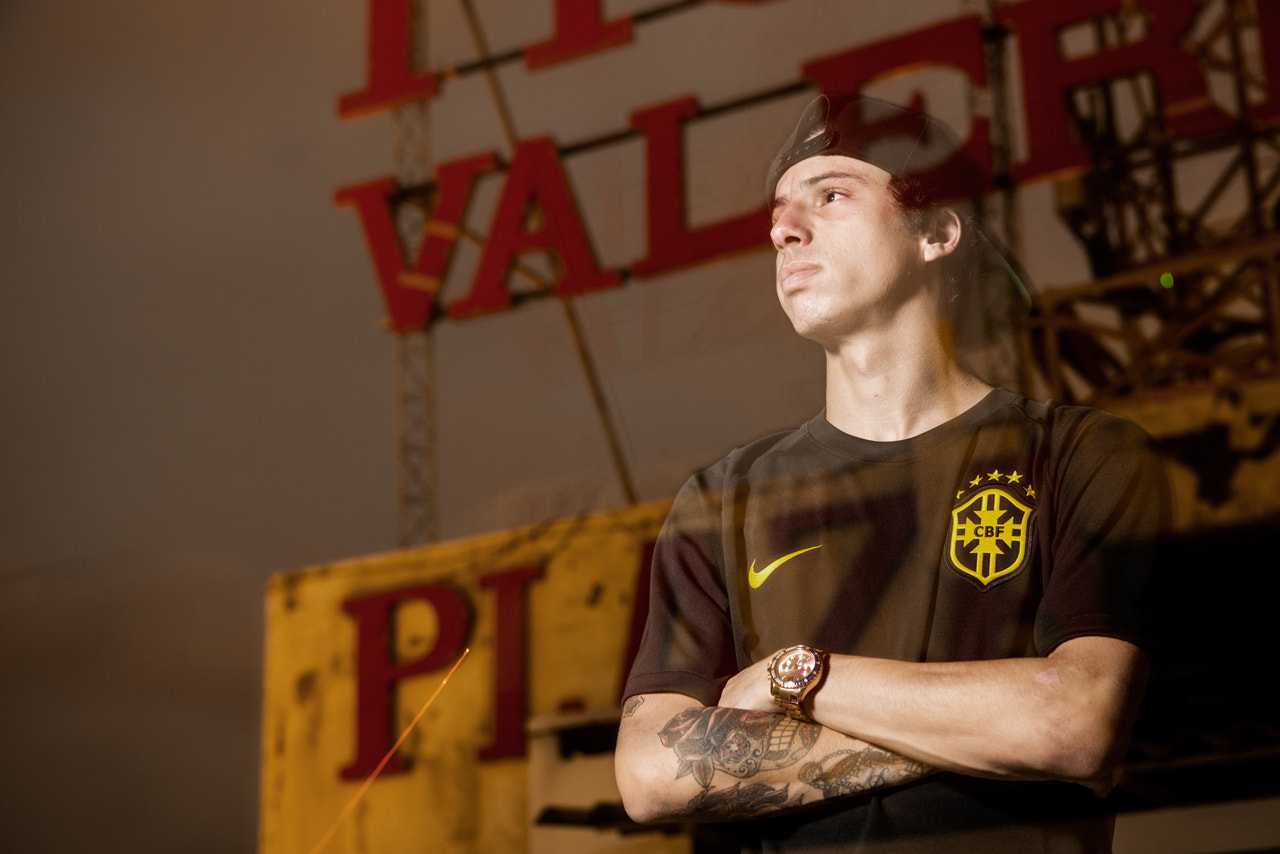
- Oliveira in 2014

Personal information
- Born: 1990 (age 35–36) Porto Alegre

Sport
- Country: Brazil
- Sport: Street skateboarding
- Team: Nike SB, Spitfire
Medal record
Men's street skateboarding
Representing Brazil
World Championships
Bronze medal – third place	2013 Newark	Street
Bronze medal – third place	2015 Chicago	Street
Street League Skateboarding
Silver medal – second place	2016 Munich	Street
Bronze medal – third place	2015 Chicago	Street
Gold medal – first place	2015 Los Angeles	Street
Gold medal – first place	2015 Newark	Street
Silver medal – second place	2014 Chicago	Street
Bronze medal – third place	2013 Munich	Street
Bronze medal – third place	2013 Newark	Street
Summer X Games
Silver medal – second place	2011 Los Angeles	Street
Bronze medal – third place	2013 Munich	Street
Bronze medal – third place	2013 Los Angeles	Street
Silver medal – second place	2014 Austin	Street
Bronze medal – third place	2016 Oslo	Street
Silver medal – second place	2019 Norway	Street

Luan Vilanova de Oliveira, best known as Luan Oliveira, is a Brazilian street skateboarder. He competed at the 2013 and 2015 World Skateboarding Championship, being awarded two bronze medals in the street event. Oliveira also competed at the Summer X Games.
