= Brady Bryant =

American soccer player and coach (born 1982)

Personal information
- Full name: Brady Bryant
- Date of birth: February 13, 1982 (age 44)
- Place of birth: Minneapolis, Minnesota, United States
- Height: 6 ft 0 in (1.83 m)
- Position: Defender

Team information
- Current team: Wichita B-52s
- Number: 20

College career
Years	Team	Apps	(Gls)
2000	The Citadel Bulldogs		
2001–2003	Mobile Rams		

Senior career*
Years	Team	Apps	(Gls)
2002	Chicago Eagles Select		
2003	West Michigan Edge	11	(0)
2004–2006	Wilmington Hammerheads	47	(0)
2008–2013	Charlotte Eagles	64	(4)
2011–2012	Norfolk SharX (indoor)	16	(4)
2012–2013	Wichita Wings (indoor)	9	(1)
2013-2015	Wichita B-52s (indoor)	26	(14)
- * Club domestic league appearances and goals as of February 14, 2014

Brady Bryant (born February 13, 1982) is an American soccer player.

== Career ==
=== College and amateur ===
Bryant played college soccer at The Citadel before transferring to the University of Mobile before his sophomore season, where he was a 2002 NAIA honorable mention (third team) All American.

Bryant also played for the Chicago Eagles Select and West Michigan Edge, both of the Premier Development League during his collegiate career.

=== Professional ===
Bryant signed with the Wilmington Hammerheads of the USL Second Division in 2004. He spent three seasons with Wilmington before unexpectedly moving to the National Indoor Football League in 2007, where he played as a wide receiver for the Columbia Stingers.

In 2008, Bryant returned to soccer with unsuccessful trials at the Portland Timbers and Charleston Battery of the USL-1. He was then signed by the Charlotte Eagles of the USL-2 where he was a 2008 first team USL-2 All Star.

== Personal ==
Bryant is the son of Bobby Bryant, a defensive back with the Minnesota Vikings.
