= Wichita Wings (2011–2013) =

- Founded: 2011
- Dissolved: 2013
- Ground: Hartman Arena
- Capacity: 6,500
- Owner: Wink Hartman
- Head Coach: (United States) LeBaron Hollimon
- League: MISL
- 2012-13: 7th MISL
Home colors	Away colors

The Wichita Wings were an expansion team for the Major Indoor Soccer League that began play in Hartman Arena, November 2011. The Wichita Wings, in this formation, were a revitalized version of the original Wings franchise that played in the MISL and NPSL for 22 years, before folding in 2001. This incarnation of the Wings shut down after the 2012-13 Major Indoor Soccer League season. They were replaced by a new team called the Wichita B-52s who play in the Professional Arena Soccer League, which later became the Major Arena Soccer League.

== Year-by-year ==
Season	League	Regular season	Playoffs	Avg. attendance
2011–12	MISL III	3rd Central Division, 7-15	Did not qualify	3,808
2012–13	MISL III	7th MISL, 7-19	Did not qualify	2,870
Total		14-24; Win % = .292%	N/A; Win % = N/A	3,339

=== Final squad ===
Updated February 7, 2012 Note: Flags indicate national team as defined under FIFA eligibility rules; some limited exceptions apply. Players may hold more than one non-FIFA nationality.

No.	Pos.	Nation	Player
2	MF	USA	Chris Lemons
3	MF	USA	Alex Moseley
4	FW	USA	Andrew Hoxie
9	FW	BRA	Freddy Moojen
10	MF	BRA	Tiguinho
11	FW	BRA	Geison Moura
12	MF	CUB	Miguel Ferrer
13	MF	USA	Michael Mesle
14	FW	TRI	Kareem Yearwood

No.	Pos.	Nation	Player
15	FW	ENG	Edvin Worley
16	DF	USA	Kevin Ten Eyck
18	DF	MEX	Adrian Gonzalez
19	MF	MEX	Daniel Villegas
20	DF	USA	Brady Bryant
21	GK	USA	Nic Martinez
23	DF	MEX	Victor Quiroz
25	GK	BRA	Sanaldo Carvalho
77	MF	BRA	Andre Berenzon
99	FW	USA	Matt Clare
