= Monterrey La Raza (2007–2010) =

- Full name: La Raza de Monterrey (Spanish); Monterrey La Raza (English)
- Founded: 2007
- Dissolved: 2010
- Ground: Arena Monterrey
- Capacity: 17,599
- Owner: (Mexico) Miguel Ángel Garza
- Head Coach: (Argentina) Mariano Bollella
- League: Major Indoor Soccer League
- 2009–10: Regular Season: 3rd Playoffs: Champions
Home colors	Away colors

Monterrey La Raza (Spanish: La Raza de Monterrey) were a Mexican professional indoor soccer team based in Monterrey, Mexico. Founded in 2007, the team played in the Major Indoor Soccer League.

The team played its home games at Arena Monterrey. The team's colors were orange, black and white. Their last head coach was Mariano Bollella.

== History ==
This version of the Monterrey La Raza indoor soccer team began play in fall 2007 at Arena Monterrey as a member of the Major Indoor Soccer League. On July 17, 2007, the MISL officially announced that La Raza would enter the league for the 2007–08 season.

La Raza played their home games in Arena Monterrey, owned by TV Azteca, the second largest Mexican television network. TV Azteca also owned La Raza.

TV Azteca acquired the rights to the Monterrey La Raza name from the owner of the original CISL/WISL franchise, Pedro Luis Durán.

The team was successful in its lone MISL season, reaching the league's championship game before losing to the Baltimore Blast. When the MISL folded, La Raza announced they would be joining the NISL for its inaugural 2008–09 season. They also announced an exhibition schedule against PASL teams for the 2008–09 season.

== Year-by-year ==
Year	League	Logo	Reg. season	Playoffs	Attendance average
2007–08	MISL II		4th MISL, 16–14	Lost final, 8–13	9,980
2008–09	NISL		3rd NISL, 10–8	Lost semi-final, 1–2	5,490
2008–09	PASL Copa América		1st East Group, 5–0	Won Championship, 1–0	3,820
2009–10	MISL III		3rd MISL, 10–10	Won Championship, 12–6	3,881
Total			41–32; Win % = .780	6–5; Win % = .833	6,430

== Head coaches ==
- (Germany) Erich Geyer (2007–2009)
- (Argentina) Mariano Bollella (2009–2010)

== Arenas ==
- Arena Monterrey; Monterrey, Mexico (2007–2010)
