= Utica City FC =

Arena soccer team

- Full name: Utica City Football Club
- Short name: UCFC
- Founded: 2010; 16 years ago (as the "Syracuse Silver Knights")
- Stadium: Adirondack Bank Center
- Capacity: 3,860
- Owner: Tommy Tanner & Robert Esche
- Head Coach: Nate Bourdeau
- League: Major Arena Soccer League
- 2025–26: 8th Did not qualify for playoffs
- Website: uticacityfc.com
Home colors	Away colors

Utica City FC is an American professional indoor soccer team based in Utica, New York, that competes in the Major Arena Soccer League (MASL).

== History ==
The team formed in 2011 as the Syracuse Silver Knights with the intention of playing in the new I-League (a United Soccer Leagues league set to begin play in 2011), but the team moved to the Major Indoor Soccer League when the two leagues merged. The team was rumored to be named the Syracuse Scorpions and revive the name of an old American Soccer League team. However, the name Silver Knights was announced at the team's inaugural press conference.

The club is coached by former Silver Knights player, Ryan Hall, who replaced goalkeeper Bryan O'Quinn, who replaced club president, team owner and Syracuse native Tommy Tanner for the 2016–17 season.

The club has signed former Syracuse Salty Dogs player Ryan Hall, among others. The team announced the signing of former Major League Soccer star Diego Serna on October 11, 2011.

The Syracuse Silver Knights' first season of play began in 2011–12 when they joined the MISL as an expansion franchise. For their inaugural season, the Silver Knights played their home games at the Oncenter War Memorial Arena in downtown Syracuse.

The team finished third in the Eastern Division in 2012, having been eliminated from playoff contention when the Rochester Lancers beat the Wichita Wings on February 23, 2012.

In 2013, the Silver Knight Foundation was launched to help benefit kids in tough economic and social situations. The foundation hosts events throughout the year which helps raise money for these children. Many Silver Knights players, including reserve and U19 players, volunteer their time to help partake in the events.

After the 2013–2014 season, the team announced that it was leaving the MISL along with five other teams joining the PASL, which was subsequently renamed the MASL.

On June 13, 2018, the team announced that it had partnered with the Utica Comets of the AHL and would be moving to Utica as Utica City FC for the 2018–19 season. The team did not play during the 2021 season due to the COVID-19 pandemic.

== Players ==
=== Active roster ===
Updated February 11, 2025. Note: Flags indicate national team as defined under FIFA eligibility rules; players may hold more than one non-FIFA nationality.

No.	Pos.	Nation	Player	No.	Pos.	Nation	Player
0	GK	USA	Xavier Snaer-Williams	16	DF	BRA	Thayssan Santos
0	GK	BRA	Rainer Hauss	18	FW	USA	Cole Stephens
2	MF	DOM	Emmanuel Belliard	19	MF	USA	Kyle Gehrnich
3	FW	USA	Gordy Gurson	20	MF	USA	Willie Spurr
4	MF	USA	Stephan Teixeira	22	GK	USA	Brian Wilkin
6	MF	USA	Ricardo Orozco	23	DF	USA	Logan Roberts
7	MF	CPV / USA	Geo Alves	27	FW	USA	Joey Tavernese
8	DF	USA	Jose Tavares	30	DF	ECU	Juan Alava
9	FW	BRA	Kelvin Oliveira	33	FW	USA	Sergio Pinal
10	MF	CPV / USA	Nilton de Andrade	49	FW	AFG	Mershad Ahmadi
11	FW	CPV	Meny Silva	67	FW	USA	Francesco Pangano
14	GK	USA	Andrew Taylor	95	DF	FRA	Wil Nyamsi

=== Inactive roster ===
Note: Flags indicate national team as defined under FIFA eligibility rules; some limited exceptions apply. Players may hold more than one non-FIFA nationality.

No.	Pos.	Nation	Player
8	MF	MEX	Cristhian Segura
21	DF	TTO	Darren Toby

No.	Pos.	Nation	Player
94	MF	BRA	Rafa Godoi

== Year-by-year ==
Year	League	Reg. season	Playoffs	Attendance average
2011–12	MISL III	3rd Eastern Division, 9–15	Did not qualify	2,950/6,159
2012–13	MISL III	6th MISL, 8–18	Did not qualify	3,401/6,159
2013–14	MISL III	4th MISL, 12–8	Lost semi-finals	2,689/6,159
2014–15	MASL	2nd Eastern Division, 12–8	Lost in Division Semi-Finals	3,082/6,159
2015–16	MASL	2nd Eastern Division, 11–9	Lost in Division Finals	2,082/6,159
2016–17	MASL	4th Eastern Division, 8–12	did not qualify	2,300/6,159
2017–18	MASL	2nd Eastern Division, 13–9	Lost Division Finals	2,398/6,159
2018–19	MASL	1st Eastern Division, 17–7	Lost Division Finals	3,414/3,860
2019–20	MASL	3rd Eastern Conference, 14–6	No playoffs	3,596/3,860
2021	MASL	DNP	DNP	N/A
2021–22	MASL	3rd East Conference, 10–14	Did not qualify	2,971/3,860
2022–23	MASL	4th East Conference, 13–11	Lost Division Semifinals	3,082/3,860
2023-24	MASL	2nd Eastern Conference, 16–8	Lost Division Semifinals	3,244
2024-25	MASL	6th MASL, 13–11	Lost Quarterfinals	3,175
2025-26	MASL	8th MASL, 5-19	Did not qualify	2,839
Total		117–112; Win % = .511%	7–14; Win % = .333%	2,906

== Club staff ==
- President: Robert Esche
- Vice-president: Adam Pawlick
- CFO: Alex Putelo
- Executive Administrator: Luann Horton-Murad
- General Manager: Tommy Tanner
- VP Corporate Partnerships: Alicia Leone-Desarro
- VP Creative Services: Eric Kowiatek
- Head coach: Nate Bourdeau
- Assistant coach: Darren Toby
- Director of player personnel: Joey Tavernese

== Kits ==
Period	Supplier	Home shirt sponsor	Away shirt sponsor	Third shirt sponsor
2018–19	OT Sports	Bank of Utica	Empire Recycling Corporation	Merrill Lynch

== Rivalries ==
Utica City FC/Baltimore Blast rivalry
- Location: United States
- Teams: Utica City FC; Baltimore Blast
- First meeting: Utica City FC 5–2 Baltimore Blast; MASL; December 2, 2018

Statistics
- Most wins: Tied (6 games each)
- Top scorer: Slavisa Ubiparipovic (42 points)

Utica City FC's main rival is the Baltimore Blast. It existed in their days as the Syracuse Silver Knights and has extended to Utica City FC when the team relocated. Both teams have won five games in the series since their first meeting on December 2, 2018, a 4–2 win for Utica City. The Rochester Lancers are also considered a rival of Utica City FC. Rochester is two hours away from Utica and are Utica's closest opponent by proximity. The first matchup of this rivalry took place on November 29, 2019, with Utica City defeating Rochester by a 9–1 score.
