= Norfolk SharX =

- Founded: 2011
- Dissolved: 2012
- Ground: Norfolk Scope
- Capacity: 8,725
- Owner: Marcie Laumann
- General Manager: Jim Gooley
- Head Coach: John Hall
Home colors	Away colors

The Norfolk SharX were briefly a member of the third Major Indoor Soccer League. They began play in the 2011–2012 season., but on June 25, 2012, the team announced that because of economic hardship, the SharX would cease operations effective immediately and not return for the next season.

== Year-by-Year ==
Year	League	Logo	Regular season	Playoffs	Avg. attendance
2011-12	MISL III		4th Eastern Division, 5-18	Did not qualify	1,523
Total			5-18; Win % = .217%	N/A; Win % = N/A	1,523

=== Final Squad ===
Note: Flags indicate national team as defined under FIFA eligibility rules; some limited exceptions apply. Players may hold more than one non-FIFA nationality.

No.	Pos.	Nation	Player
0	GK	USA	Brian Sowell
2	DF	USA	Andrew Marshall
3	MF	USA	James Gunderson
4	DF	USA	Brady Bryant
5	DF	NIR	Tennant McVea
6	FW	USA	Matt Clare
7	MF	ENG	Matthew Delicâte
8	DF	BRA	Gerson dos Santos
9	FW	BRA	Marcello Alves
10	MF	USA	Cecil Lewis
11	MF	CUB	Miguel Ferrer
12	DF	CMR	William Yomby

No.	Pos.	Nation	Player
13	FW	JAM	Gary Brooks
14	DF	USA	Brandon Massie
16	DF		Jefferson Brandao De Oliveria
17	-	USA	Marcos Schmidt
18	MF	USA	Rob Acosta
19	GK	USA	Jamie Lieberman
22	GK	USA	Tyler Benham

As of February 4, 2012
