= Mike Moyer =

American academic (born 1971)

Michael (Mike) Moyer
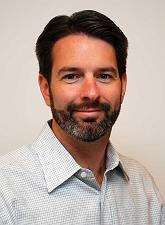
- Born: August 4, 1971 (age 55); Philadelphia, Pennsylvania, US
- Occupations: Author, entrepreneur, university teacher
- Website: mikemoyer.com

Michael Dirck Moyer (born in 1971) is an American entrepreneur, author, adjunct lecturer at Northwestern University, and adjunct associate professor at the University of Chicago Booth School of Business. He has written eight books in support of achieving success in advanced education and business, including How to Make Colleges Want You (2008) and Slicing Pie (2012), the latter of which outlined his strategy for dividing equity in startup companies.

Moyer and his business partner Alyson Tesler were the winners of the 2003 New Venture Challenge at the University of Chicago, for which their startup, Vicarious Communications, Inc., received a $25,000 investment from the university.

== Education ==
Moyer attended the University of Kansas, receiving a BA degree in 1995. He then studied integrated marketing communications at Northwestern University, receiving an MS degree in 1996, after which he received an MBA degree from the University of Chicago in 2004.

== Business ventures ==
In 1992 Moyer founded Moondog, a manufacturer of outdoor clothing and accessories. In 2003 Moyer founded Vicarious Communication, Inc., a marketing services company serving the veterinary industry. The company was funded by a $1 million angel round that included the University of Chicago. Moyer was vice president of brand strategy at Workhorse, a startup chassis manufacturer, when it was acquired by International Truck and Engine Corporation in 2005. The following year, Moyer co-founded Cappex.com, which helps students find the right college and was financed through a $5 million angel round. Cappex.com was acquired by EAB in 2020.

His 2012 book Slicing Pie outlined a formula for creating fair equity splits among startup co-founders.

== Bibliography ==
- Moyer, Mike (2008). How to Make Colleges Want You: Insider Secrets for Tipping the Admissions Odds in Your Favor. Naperville: Sourcebooks. ISBN 978-1-4022-1367-0.
- Moyer, Mike (2012). Slicing Pie: Funding Your Company Without Funds. Lake Forest: Lake Shark Ventures, LLC. p. 161. ISBN 978-1-4700-2772-8.
- Moyer, Mike (2012). Trade Show Samurai: The Four Core Arts for Capturing Leads. Lake Forest: Lake Shark Ventures, LLC. p. 182. ISBN 978-1-4681-6871-6.
- Moyer, Mike & Fuller, Jerry (2013). Business Basics: A Guide to Who Does What is Today's Organizations. Chicago: Associated Colleges of Illinois. p. 172. ISBN 978-0-6158-4527-2.
- Moyer, Mike (2016). The Slicing Pie Handbook: Perfectly Fair Equity Splits for Bootstrapped Startups. Lake Forest: Fair and Square Ventures, LLC. p. 212. ISBN 978-0-692-58462-0
- Moyer, Mike (2021). Will Work for Pie: Building Your Startup Using Equity Instead of Cash. New Degree Press. p. 236. ISBN 978-1-63676-848-9
