= Mauricio Hernández (footballer) =

Mexican footballer (born 1993)

Personal information
- Full name: Mauricio Hernández Rizo
- Date of birth: 22 May 1993 (age 33)
- Place of birth: Guadalajara, Jalisco, Mexico
- Height: 1.77 m (5 ft 10 in)
- Position: Midfielder

Youth career
- 2009–2013: Guadalajara

Senior career*
Years	Team	Apps	(Gls)
2013–2014	Guadalajara	0	(0)
2014–2015	→ Coras Tepic (loan)	4	(1)
2016	Inter Playa	29	(3)
2017–2019	La Piedad	71	(13)
2018	→ Real Zamora (loan)	15	(2)
2019–2020	Durango	23	(3)
2020	Jaguares de Jalisco	0	(0)
2022	Durango	15	(0)
2024–2025	Tepatitlán	0	(0)
- * Club domestic league appearances and goals as of 16:11, 26 July 2024 (UTC)

Mauricio Hernández Rizo (born 22 May 1993) is a Mexican professional footballer who plays as a midfielder.
