= Orlando Sharks =

- Founded: 2007
- Dissolved: 2009
- Ground: Amway Arena
- Capacity: 15,948
- Owner: Buena Vista Corporation
Home colors	Away colors

The Orlando Sharks were a professional American indoor soccer team based in Orlando, Florida, United States. Founded in 2007, by Buena Vista Corporation the Chairman Mr. Sham Maharaj acquired the franchise early 2006. the first game was played in November 2007. MISL Commissioner Steve Ryan announced the Orlando during the championship game in St. Louis. The game, between the St. Louis Steamers and the Baltimore Blast, televised on ESPN2. Sham Maharaj, owner of the Orlando franchise, and team president Rich Bradley, the former executive vice-president and chief operating officer of the Kansas City Comets of the MISL, both were present for the announcement. The team played in the Major Indoor Soccer League, but the team played for only a season due to conflicts with the Amway's calendar.

The team played its home games at the Amway Arena. The team colors were black, teal, and white. Their head coach was Jake Dancy.
