= Tommy Tanner =

American soccer player & coach (born 1968)

Tom Tanner
Personal information
- Full name: Thomas Tanner
- Date of birth: March 10, 1968 (age 58)
- Place of birth: Syracuse, New York, United States
- Height: 5 ft 8 in (1.73 m)
- Position: Midfielder

Team information
- Current team: Utica City FC (general manager)

College career
Years	Team	Apps	(Gls)
1986–1990	NC State Wolfpack		

Senior career*
Years	Team	Apps	(Gls)
1991–2001	Cleveland Crunch (indoor)	387	(236)
1996–2002	Rochester Rhinos	141	(11)
2003–2004	Syracuse Salty Dogs	17	(2)

Managerial career
- 2003–2004: Syracuse Salty Dogs (assistant)
- 2011–2016: Syracuse Silver Knights
- 2016–: Utica City FC (general manager)
- * Club domestic league appearances and goals

Thomas Tanner is a retired American soccer midfielder who played professionally in the USL A-League, Major Indoor Soccer League and National Professional Soccer League. He was the 1992 MISL Rookie of the Year. Tanner is the owner and currently the general manager of Utica City FC of the Major Arena Soccer League.

== Youth ==
Tanner graduated from Henninger High School where he was a 1984 third team and 1985 fourth team NSCAA High School All American and a 1985 Parade Magazine High School All American soccer player. He attended North Carolina State University, playing on the men's soccer team from 1986 to 1990. He graduated with a bachelor's degree in business management in 1991.

== Professional ==
In 1991, the Cleveland Crunch of the Major Indoor Soccer League selected Tanner in the second round of the MISL Draft. On June 29, 1991, Tanner made his debut and scored his first goal for the Crunch in a rare outdoor exhibition game against PSV Eindhoven. He was the 1992 MISL Rookie of the Year. The MISL collapsed in 1992 and the Crunch moved to the National Professional Soccer League. Tanner and his teammates went on to win the 1994, 1996, and 1999 championships. In 2000, the Crunch lost in the finals to the Milwaukee Wave. Tanner retired from the Crunch in 2001.

In 1996, Tanner joined the Rochester Rhinos of the USISL A-League. He spent each summer for the next six years playing for the Rhinos, serving as team captain from 1998 to 2001. In 1996, Rochester went to the finals of both the league championship and the Open Cup. In 1999, Rochester won the 1999 U.S. Open Cup. It also won league titles in 1998, 2000 and 2001. In 2003, Tanner moved to the Syracuse Salty Dogs as a player-assistant coach. In August 2003, he added general manager to his list of team duties. The Salty Dogs withdrew from the league following the 2004 season and folded.

Tanner earned the nickname "The Architect" after leading Utica City FC to the Regular Season Eastern Division Championship during the team's inaugural season in 2018–19.

== Coach ==
In 2001, Tanner became the director of coaching with the Syracuse Soccer Academy, a position he held until 2003. In 2003, Tanner became an assistant coach with the Syracuse Salty Dogs of the USL A-League. In 2004, he founded and coached the Syracuse Youth Football Club. In 2011, he became the head coach and owner of the Syracuse Silver Knights. In 2017, Tanner changed roles from head coach of the Silver Knights to general manager.
