= Max Ferdinand =

Haitian footballer (born 1986)

Personal information
- Full name: Max Ferdinand
- Date of birth: November 4, 1986 (age 39)
- Place of birth: Haiti
- Height: 5 ft 9 in (1.75 m)
- Position: Forward

Team information
- Current team: Milwaukee Wave
- Number: 24

Senior career*
Years	Team	Apps	(Gls)
2009	FC Reading Revolution		
2009–2015	Baltimore Blast (indoor)	124	(97)
2010–2011	Rochester Rhinos	25	(2)
2015–2020	Milwaukee Wave (indoor)	99	(84)
2021	St. Louis Ambush (indoor)	10	(2)
2021–2023	Baltimore Blast (indoor)	34	(10)
2023–	Milwaukee Wave (indoor)	9	(6)
- * Club domestic league appearances and goals as of 27 November 2024

Max Ferdinand (born November 4, 1986) is a Haitian footballer currently playing for the Milwaukee Wave in the Major Arena Soccer League.

== Career ==
=== Youth and amateur ===
Ferdinand grew up in Reading, Pennsylvania and attended Reading High School, but did not play college soccer. In 2009 Ferdinand played with FC Reading Revolution in the National Premier Soccer League.

=== Professional ===
In 2010, Ferdinand, then with the MASL's Baltimore Blast, was named the league's Rookie of the Year.

After trialing with Chicago Fire of Major League Soccer, Ferdinand signed with the Rochester Rhinos in 2010. He made his professional debut on May 19, 2010, in a game against Crystal Palace Baltimore, and scored his first professional outdoor goal on June 26, 2010, in a game against the Puerto Rico Islanders.

Ferdinand signed with the Baltimore Blast on September 9, 2021.

== Honors ==
=== Rochester Rhinos ===
- USSF Division 2 Pro League Regular Season Champions (1): 2010

=== Milwaukee Wave ===
- 2018-19 MASL Champion
- 2018-19 All-MASL First Team
