= Chicago Riot =

American indoor soccer team

- Founded: 2010
- Dissolved: 2011
- Ground: Odeum Expo Center
- Capacity: 3,500
- President/CEO: Peter Wilt
- Head Coach: (United States) Jeff Kraft
- League: MISL
- Website: https://web.archive.org/web/20101027064419/http://chicagoriotsoccer.com/

The Chicago Riot was an indoor soccer team that played in the Major Indoor Soccer League. They were based in Villa Park, Illinois, near Chicago, and they played their home games at the Odeum Expo Center.

== Namesake ==
The team is named after the numerous riots in Chicago's history, such as the Lager Beer Riot (1855), the Haymarket affair (1886), the Aldermen's Wars (1916–1921), the Chicago Race Riot of 1919, the Memorial Day massacre of 1937, the Division Street Riots (1966), the 1968 Chicago riots which followed the assassination of Martin Luther King, Jr., the Democratic National Convention protests later that year, and the Days of Rage (1969).

== Ownership ==
Peter Wilt served as the principal owner, as well as the president and CEO. Wilt is a key figure in the history of Chicago professional soccer, having served as the first President/GM of Major League Soccer's Chicago Fire, later becoming CEO of Women's Professional Soccer's Chicago Red Stars before leaving to start the Riot.

== Year-by-year ==
Year	League	Logo	Reg. season	Playoffs	Attendance average
2010–11	MISL III		MISL, 5th 5–15	Failed to qualify	1,082
Total			5–15; Win % = .250	N/A; Win % = N/A	1,082
