= Major Indoor Soccer League (2008–2014) =

Former indoor soccer league

Major Indoor Soccer League (MISL)
- Founded: 2008
- Folded: 2014
- Country: United States, Mexico
- Last champions: Missouri Comets
- Most championships: Milwaukee Wave (2); Baltimore Blast (2)
- Website: http://misl.uslsoccer.com

The Major Indoor Soccer League (MISL), originally known as the National Indoor Soccer League, was a professional indoor soccer league which began play in 2008. It was the third league to be known as the Major Indoor Soccer League after the MISL I and MISL II. The MISL name is arguably the most recognizable name in indoor soccer due to its history dating back to 1978. The league name and assets are currently owned by the United Soccer Leagues. The departure of six teams which joined the Professional Arena Soccer League (now the Major Arena Soccer League) after the 2013–14 season effectively ended the MISL.

== History ==
=== Launch as NISL ===
The NISL was one of three leagues that organized in late 2008 after the demise of the second MISL; the other two being the PASL-Pro (an offshoot of the Premier Arena Soccer League) and the Xtreme Soccer League. The NISL and the XSL were more closely related, with both leagues first announcing four former MISL teams respectively and using the same game rules as the MISL.

Originally, five teams had been announced to play in the inaugural season; four who were in the previous MISL (Baltimore, Monterrey, Orlando Sharks, and Philadelphia) and one formerly in the American Indoor Soccer League (Rockford). However, the Orlando Sharks were forced to go inactive because of scheduling conflicts with Amway Arena. Later, a second former AISL franchise, the Massachusetts Twisters, were brought in to take the place of the Sharks.

In July 2009, the XSL announced they were going on a one-year hiatus due to a lack of monetary backing during the Great Recession. The NISL attempted to attract the former MISL teams from the folded XSL to join for the 2009–10 season, and succeeded in acquiring the Milwaukee Wave as a result. The other XSL franchises, minus the Chicago Storm, folded along with the XSL. Shortly after the Wave joined the NISL, the Massachusetts Twisters folded, leaving the 2009–10 season with only five teams again.

Shortly before the league launched its 2009–10 season, the opportunity arose to purchase the rights to the "Major Indoor Soccer League" name; the league successfully acquired the rights and immediately rebranded itself as the newest MISL.

The MISL expanded into Missouri (Kansas City area) and Omaha starting with the 2010–11 season.

=== Merger with I-League ===
For the 2010–11 season, the league consisted of only five teams, with the Rockford Rampage and Monterrey La Raza no longer active league members. On October 15, 2010, the Milwaukee Journal-Sentinel reported the exodus of the Philadelphia KiXX and the addition of a Chicago franchise.

Logo for proposed USL I-League

In October 2010, the United Soccer Leagues (USL), which also oversees the men's USL Pro and USL Premier Development Leagues proposed a new league which was to begin play in the fall of 2011, the 'USL I-League. However, in May 2011, the USL, struggling to sign teams for the new league, agreed instead to take over operation of the MISL. Three teams from the proposed league were added: the Norfolk SharX, Rochester Lancers and Syracuse Silver Knights.

In June 2012, the MISL announced that a new Chicago franchise was awarded to Armando Gamboa and Dave Mokry for the 2012–13 season. The club was subsequently named the Chicago Soul, with the club making its home at the Sears Centre. Meanwhile, the Norfolk SharX announced that the team would cease operations effective immediately because of financial difficulties.

=== Final season ===
A new incarnation of the St. Louis Ambush were announced as an expansion team in June 2013. This was St. Louis' first professional indoor soccer team since the St. Louis Steamers folded in 2006.

One day after the 2013–14 MISL Championship game, USL President Tim Holt released a video stating that the USL was reevaluating the MISL to create a more "sustainable" league that features the highest level of professional indoor soccer. He noted that the process would take "more than a few months" and that the possibility of not having a 2014–15 playing season existed.

In the following months, six of the seven teams from the final MISL season joined the Professional Arena Soccer League, which was renamed the Major Arena Soccer League. This was the effective end of MISL III.

== Commissioner ==
Name	Years
David Grimaldi	2008–2011
Chris Economides	2011–2014

== Teams ==
Team	City/Area	Arena	Founded	1st Season	Last season	Status
Baltimore Blast	Baltimore	Baltimore Arena	1992	2008	2014	Departed in 2014 for MASL
Chicago Riot	Chicago	Odeum Expo Center	2010	2010	2011	Folded in 2011
Chicago Soul	Hoffman Estates, Illinois	Sears Centre	2012	2012	2013	Folded in 2013
Massachusetts Twisters	West Springfield, Massachusetts	The Big E Coliseum	2003	2008	2009	Folded in 2009
Milwaukee Wave	Milwaukee	U.S. Cellular Arena	1984	2009	2014	Departed in 2014 for MASL
Missouri Comets	Independence, Missouri	Silverstein Eye Centers Arena	2010	2010	2014	Departed in 2014 for MASL
Monterrey La Raza	Monterrey, Nuevo León	Arena Monterrey	2007	2008	2010	Folded in 2010
Norfolk SharX	Norfolk, Virginia	Norfolk Scope	2010	2011	2012	Folded in 2012
Omaha Vipers	Omaha, Nebraska	Omaha Civic Auditorium	2010	2010	2011	Departed in 2011 for PASL; folded before season began
Orlando Sharks†	Orlando, Florida	Amway Arena	2007	2008	2008	Folded in 2008
Pennsylvania Roar	Reading, Pennsylvania	Santander Arena	2013	2013	2014	Folded in 2014
Philadelphia KiXX	Philadelphia	Liacouras Center	1995	2008	2010	Folded in 2010
Rochester Lancers	Rochester, New York	Blue Cross Arena	2010	2010	2014	Departed in 2014 for MASL
Rockford Rampage	Rockford, Illinois	Rockford MetroCentre	2005	2008	2010	Folded in 2010
St. Louis Ambush	St. Charles, Missouri	Family Arena	2013	2013	2014	Departed in 2014 for MASL
Syracuse Silver Knights	Syracuse, New York	War Memorial at Oncenter	2010	2010	2014	Departed in 2014 for MASL
Wichita Wings	Park City, Kansas	Hartman Arena	2011	2011	2013	Folded in 2013

† Never played an NISL/MISL game

== Championships ==
Season	Date(s)	Champion	Series	Runner-up	Score(s)	Host	Playoffs MVP
2008–09	April 11, 2009	Baltimore Blast	1–0	Rockford Rampage	13–10	Baltimore	Sagu
2009–10	April 4, 2010	Monterrey La Raza	1–0	Milwaukee Wave	12–6	Milwaukee	Carlos Farias
2010–11	March 25, 2011	Milwaukee Wave	1–0	Baltimore Blast	16–7	Baltimore	Marcel Feenstra
2011–12	March 16, 2012; March 18, 2012	Milwaukee Wave	2–0	Baltimore Blast	14–2, 12–10 (OT)	Baltimore/Milwaukee	Marcio Leite
2012–13	March 14, 2013; March 16, 2013	Baltimore Blast	2–0	Missouri Comets	21–12, 8–6	Missouri/Baltimore	William Vanzela
2013–14	March 14, 2014; March 16, 2014	Missouri Comets	2–1	Baltimore Blast	15–8, 4–19, 6–4	Missouri/Baltimore	Brian Harris

== Average attendance ==
Year	Games	Total	Average	Playoffs	Games	Total	Average
2008–09	41	170,696	4,163	2009	3^{#}	16,311	5,437
2009–10	50	188,005	3,760	2010	3	14,415	4,805
2010–11	50	199,123	3,982	2011	3^{#}	17,219	5,740
2011–12	84	336,478	4,005	2012	6	30,820	5,136
2012–13	91	377,027	4,143	2013	6^{#}	30,698	6,140
2013–14	70	326,123	4,658	2014	6^{#}	27,794	4,633
Seasons	Games	Total	Average	Seasons	Games	Total	Average
6	386	1,597,452	4,138	6	26	137,257	5,280

^{#} A third "mini-game" had to decide the winner after one or more series were tied at 1 game a piece.
