= 2019 National Amateur Cup =

96th edition of cup competition in American soccer

2019 USASA National Amateur Cup
Tournament details
- Country: United States
- Teams: 37

Final positions
- Champions: Newtown Pride FC (1st title)
- Runners-up: Horizon FC
- Third place: MesoAmerica FC
- Fourth place: RWB Adria

Tournament statistics
- Matches played: 34
- Goals scored: 132 (3.88 per match)

The 2019 National Amateur Cup was the 96th edition of the National Amateur Cup, a knockout cup competition open to amateur teams affiliated with the United States Adult Soccer Association (USASA). This was the second edition of the tournament to award a spot in the U.S. Open Cup to its champion.

Newtown Pride FC won their first National Amateur Cup title, defeating Horizon FC 3–0 in the final.

== Format ==
All four regions of the USASA held tournaments to crown champions, which would then qualify for the final tournament. Qualification for these regionals was determined by each one, with USASA Region I, III, and IV awarding spots to the champions of each state or local association's amateur tournament.

The final four teams then compete in a single location knockout tournament to determine a national champion, with an additional game in place to crown both third and fourth place.

== Region I ==
First round

April 7	Christos FC (Maryland)	2–1	(New York (state)) BSC Raiders	Essex, Maryland
		Report		Stadium: Essex Community College

Bracket

Home teams listed on top of bracket

Quarterfinals; April 28
MD	Christos FC	0
PA	Steel FC	1
PA	Philadelphia Lone Star
VA	The Benchwarmers
NJ	Jackson Lions FC	1
CT	Newtown Pride FC	6
NY	Cedar Stars Academy	3
MA	Mosteiros FM	1

Semifinals; May 18 – 19
PA	Steel FC	4
PA	Philadelphia Lone Star	1
CT	Newtown Pride FC	2
NY	Cedar Stars Academy	1

Final; June 15
PA	Steel FC	0
CT	Newtown Pride FC	2

== Region II ==
First round

April 13	Union Dubuque F.C. (Iowa)	0–1	(Illinois) Springfield FC	Dubuque, Iowa
5:00pm (CDT)		Final score Match stream		Stadium: Emmaus Bible College

April 13	Ann Arbor FC (Michigan)	1–4	(Michigan) Grand Rapids FC	Grandville, Michigan
7:30pm (EDT)		Report		Stadium: Grandville High School

April 14	Gunners (Ohio)	2–1	(Ohio) Valhalla FC	Dayton, Ohio
10:00 AM EDT		Report		Stadium: The Miami Valley School

April 28	Hayward United SC (Wisconsin)	0–6	(Minnesota) Stegman's SC	Hayward, Wisconsin
2:00pm (CDT)		Report		Stadium: Hayward Intermediate School

Bracket

Home teams listed on top of bracket

Second round April 20 – May 4
MI	Hamtramck City FC	2
MI	Teranga Lions	1
MI	Grand Rapids FC	0
MI	Livonia City FC	1
WI	Milwaukee Bavarian	3
MN	Stegman's SC	0
MN	FC Minneapolis	8
WI	Barron Soccer Team	1
IL	A.A.C. Eagles	3(5)
IL	Schwaben AC	3(6)
IL	RWB Adria	2
IL	Springfield FC	0
IN	Old Bhoys SC
OH	Gunners
MI	Michigan Stars FC	3
MI	Hamtramck Warriors	0

Quarterfinals; May 8 – 15
MI	Hamtramck City FC
Bye (Note: Livonia City FC was disqualified from the tournament on May 7 due to fielding an ineligible player against Grand Rapids FC. Two days later, Grand Rapids FC was also disqualified from the tournament for fielding too many players during its two previous matches.)
WI	Milwaukee Bavarian	6
MN	FC Minneapolis	2
IL	Schwaben AC	1
IL	RWB Adria	3
IN	Old Bhoys SC	3
MI	Michigan Stars FC	0

Semifinals; June 5 – 8
MI	Hamtramck City FC	1
WI	Milwaukee Bavarian	6
IL	RWB Adria	4
IN	Old Bhoys SC	0

Final; July 2
WI	Milwaukee Bavarian	0
IL	RWB Adria	1

== Region III ==
Home teams listed on top of bracket

Semifinals; June 7
GA	Kalonji Soccer Academy	2
TX	Horizon FC	5
TX	ASC New Stars	1
AL	Pumas FC	0

Final; June 9
TX	Horizon FC	2
TX	ASC New Stars	0

== Region IV ==
Home teams listed on top of bracket

Semifinals; June 9, 24
AZ	Real Jalisciense	2
CO	GAM United FC	3
CA	MesoAmerica FC	5
CA	Chula Vista FC	2

Final; July 7
CO	GAM United FC	2(10)
CA	MesoAmerica FC	2(11)

== National Amateur Cup Finals ==
The finals tournament was held between August 2 and 3 on the campus of Triton College in River Grove, Illinois, a suburb of Chicago.

Newtown Pride FC won its first national title, the first by a Connecticut-based club since the Hartford Italian American Stars AC in 1967, along with $15,000 and spots in both the 2020 Hank Steinbrecher Cup and 2020 U.S. Open Cup. Horizon FC took home $10,000 for finishing runner-up while both MesoAmerica FC and RWB Adria earned $7,500 each for finishing third and fourth respectively.

Semifinal; August 2
TX	Horizon FC	2
CA	MesoAmerica FC	1
CT	Newtown Pride FC	2
IL	RWB Adria	0

Final; August 3
TX	Horizon FC	0
CT	Newtown Pride FC	4
Third place
CA	MesoAmerica FC	6
IL	RWB Adria	2

Semifinals

August 2	Horizon FC	2–1	MesoAmerica FC	Triton College; River Grove, Illinois
2:00pm (CDT)	Ayala 7'; Zatarain 37'	Match broadcast	Paolo 82'

August 2	Newtown Pride FC	2–0	RWB Adria	Triton College; River Grove, Illinois
5:00pm (CDT)	55'; 87'	Match broadcast

Third place match

August 3	MesoAmerica FC	6–2	RWB Adria	Triton College; River Grove, Illinois
5:00pm (CDT)	Paulo 5'; Orr 7', 51', 85', 87'; Javier Castro 22'	Match broadcast	10'; Zach Reget 18'

National Amateur Cup Final

August 3	Horizon FC	0–4	Newtown Pride FC	Triton College; River Grove, Illinois
7:30pm (CDT)		Match broadcast	Mauro Dos Santos 8'; Lucas Gabriel 31' (pen.); Syllia Salifou 48'; Tavoy Morgan 85'
