= The Soccer Tournament 2024 =

The Soccer Tournament 2024, also referred to as TST 2024, was the second annual edition of The Soccer Tournament. The tournament was held from 5–10 June 2024 in Cary, North Carolina. There were two tournaments, one each for men and women, with both having a $1 million prize for the winners.

== Men's tournament ==
The Soccer Tournament 2024 – Men's tournament
Tournament details
- Country: United States
- Venue: WakeMed Soccer Park
- Dates: 5 June—10 June
- Teams: 48
- All statistics correct as of 22 May 2024.

The men's tournament consisted of 48 teams, in twelve groups of four.

=== Group stage ===
All times are local (UTC−05:00).

==== Group A ====
| Pos | Team | Pld | W | L | GF | GA | GD | Qualification |
|---|---|---|---|---|---|---|---|---|
| 1 | Nani FC | 3 | 3 | 0 | 14 | 4 | +10 | Knockout stage |
| 2 | La Mexicana Express | 3 | 2 | 1 | 6 | 6 | 0 | Knockout stage |
| 3 | Say Word FC | 3 | 1 | 2 | 8 | 10 | −2 | |
| 4 | Agüero Team | 3 | 0 | 3 | 7 | 15 | −8 | |

Updated to match(es) played on 6 June 2024. Source: TST
5 June 2024
11:30

| Agüero Team | 3–6 | Say Word FC |
|---|---|---|
| del Castillo 5'; Alderete 22', 39' | | Aguilar 17'; Giffuni 27'; Lambe 32', 36', 50'; Bruletti 34' |

WakeMed Soccer Park Field 3, Cary, North Carolina, United States
5 June 2024
11:45

| Nani FC | 3–1 | La Mexicana Express |
|---|---|---|
| Gutierrez 4'; Semedo 31'; Carvalho 42' | | Herre 19' |

WakeMed Soccer Park Field 2, Cary, North Carolina, United States

5 June 2024
20:15

| Nani FC | 5–1 | Say Word FC |
|---|---|---|
| Nani 11'; Almeida 28'; Braga 31'; Carvalho 36'; Ferreira 56' | | Aguilar 18' |

WakeMed Soccer Park Field 6, Cary, North Carolina, United States
5 June 2024
20:30

| Agüero Team | 2–3 | La Mexicana Express |
|---|---|---|
| Agüero 17'; Fernandez 29' | | Lulinha 33'; Aparecido 36'; Agüero Team 55' (o.g.) |

WakeMed Soccer Park Championship Field, Cary, North Carolina, United States

6 June 2024
18:00

| Agüero Team | 2–6 | Nani FC |
|---|---|---|
| Huergo 5'; Aguero 37' | | Sa Pereira 4'; Roque 11'; Nani 35'; Ruggles 39'; Tayou 47' |

WakeMed Soccer Park Field 3, Cary, North Carolina, United States
6 June 2024
18:00

| La Mexicana Express | 2–1 | Say Word FC |
|---|---|---|
| Kachuba 44'; Consilieri 45' | | Bruletti 23' |

WakeMed Soccer Park Field 4, Cary, North Carolina, United States

==== Group B ====
| Pos | Team | Pld | W | L | GF | GA | GD | Qualification |
|---|---|---|---|---|---|---|---|---|
| 1 | Reggae Rovers | 3 | 3 | 0 | 16 | 3 | +13 | Knockout stage |
| 2 | The CONCAFA SC | 3 | 2 | 1 | 11 | 6 | +5 | Knockout stage |
| 3 | Nati SC | 3 | 1 | 2 | 9 | 14 | −5 | |
| 4 | Burnley FC | 3 | 0 | 3 | 5 | 18 | −13 | |

Updated to match(es) played on 6 June 2024. Source: TST
5 June 2024
8:30

| The CONCAFA SC | 1–4 | Reggae Rovers |
|---|---|---|
| Mijatovic 50' | | Walsh 20'; Frater 27'; Panton 28'; Zeballos Jr 51' |

WakeMed Soccer Park Field 3, Cary, North Carolina, United States
5 June 2024
8:30

| Burnley FC | 3–7 | Nati SC |
|---|---|---|
| McCartney; Eagles; Torraj | | A. Walker; Ledesma, König, K. Walker; McLaughlin |

WakeMed Soccer Park Field 4, Cary, North Carolina, United States

5 June 2024
18:30

| Burnley FC | 1–7 | Reggae Rovers |
|---|---|---|
| McCartney 40' | | Rochford 10'; McFarlane 17'; Benny 19', 26', 30'; Fisher 33', 48' |

WakeMed Soccer Park Field 4, Cary, North Carolina, United States
5 June 2024
19:00

| The CONCAFA SC | 6–1 | Nati SC |
|---|---|---|
| Sanner 4', 13'; Speed 11'; Grella 15'; Gurson 40'; Mijatovic 53' | | Ledesma 24' |

WakeMed Soccer Park Field 2, Cary, North Carolina, United States

6 June 2024
19:15

| The CONCAFA SC | 4–1 | Burnley FC |
|---|---|---|
| Cameron 10', 38'; Sanner 22'; Huffman 55' | | Eagles 26' |

WakeMed Soccer Park Championship Field, Cary, North Carolina, United States
6 June 2024
19:15

| Nati SC | 1–5 | Reggae Rovers |
|---|---|---|
| Ledsema 30' | | Willis 14'; Walsh 28'; Benny 33'; Phillips 36', 42' |

WakeMed Soccer Park Field 6, Cary, North Carolina, United States

==== Group C ====
| Pos | Team | Pld | W | L | GF | GA | GD | Qualification |
|---|---|---|---|---|---|---|---|---|
| 1 | FitBodega Vancouver | 3 | 3 | 0 | 10 | 4 | +6 | Knockout stage |
| 2 | Socceroof | 3 | 2 | 1 | 10 | 5 | +5 | Knockout stage |
| 3 | Tobacco Road FC | 3 | 1 | 2 | 13 | 16 | −3 | |
| 4 | Au Vodka Swans | 3 | 0 | 3 | 10 | 18 | −8 | |

Updated to match(es) played on 5 June 2024. Source: TST
5 June 2024
13:30

| Au Vodka Swans | 1–3 | Socceroof |
|---|---|---|
| Copp 36' | | Tressens 8'; Cordeiro 31'; Ducros 44' |

WakeMed Soccer Park Field 6, Cary, North Carolina, United States
5 June 2024
13:30

| FitBodega Vancouver | 3–1 | Tobacco Road FC |
|---|---|---|
| Lee 11'; Kowal 39'; Vukic 60' | | Wadda 19' |

WakeMed Soccer Park Field 7, Cary, North Carolina, United States

5 June 2024
21:45

| Au Vodka Swans | 1–4 | FitBodega Vancouver |
|---|---|---|
| Brooker 30' | | Godbout 18'; Shumbusho 29'; Kovacevic 31'; Hodut 52' |

WakeMed Soccer Park Field 6, Cary, North Carolina, United States
5 June 2024
21:45

| Tobacco Road FC | 1–5 | Socceroof |
|---|---|---|
| Kahoussi 27' | | Achterkamp 9'; Kerliu 17'; Tobacco Road 22' (o.g.); Tressens 35', 43' |

WakeMed Soccer Park Field 5, Cary, North Carolina, United States

6 June 2024
19:30

| Au Vodka Swans | 8–11 | Tobacco Road FC |

WakeMed Soccer Park Field 3, Cary, North Carolina, United States
6 June 2024
19:30

| FitBodega Vancouver | 3–2 | Socceroof |

WakeMed Soccer Park Field 4, Cary, North Carolina, United States

==== Group D ====
| Pos | Team | Pld | W | L | GF | GA | GD | Qualification |
|---|---|---|---|---|---|---|---|---|
| 1 | Gracie FC | 2 | 2 | 0 | 12 | 5 | +7 | Knockout stage |
| 2 | La Bombonera | 2 | 2 | 0 | 11 | 7 | +4 | Knockout stage |
| 3 | Inter | 2 | 0 | 2 | 8 | 13 | −5 | |
| 4 | Banheiristas FC | 2 | 0 | 2 | 4 | 10 | −6 | |

Updated to match(es) played on 5 June 2024. Source: TST
5 June 2024
8:45

| Inter | 4–6 | La Bombonera |
|---|---|---|
| Kraft 6', 23'; Materazzi 16'; Robles 41' | | Mojica 5'; M. Giorgana 13'; Ruiz 20'; Ponce 33', 43'; Puentes 40' |

WakeMed Soccer Park Field 2, Cary, North Carolina, United States
5 June 2024
8:45

| Banheiristas FC | 1–5 | Gracie FC |
|---|---|---|
| Meneghello 6' | | De Assiz 10', 26', 32'; Harakate 16'; Ícaro 42' |

WakeMed Soccer Park Field 5, Cary, North Carolina, United States

5 June 2024
17:00

| Inter | 4–7 | Gracie FC |
|---|---|---|
| Dagostini 13', 24'; Valero 35'; Materazzi 40' | | De Assiz 5'; Laljit 11'; Karim 15', 34', 40', 51'; Harakate 15' |

WakeMed Soccer Park Field 4, Cary, North Carolina, United States
5 June 2024
17:15

| Banheiristas FC | 3–5 | La Bombonera |
|---|---|---|
| Moda 15'; Magalhaes 22'; Blanco 36' | | Sánchez 6'; Poarch 12'; J. Hernandez 14', 36'; C. Hernandez 43' |

WakeMed Soccer Park Field 6, Cary, North Carolina, United States

6 June 2024
16:00

| Inter | v | Banheiristas FC |

WakeMed Soccer Park Field 3, Cary, North Carolina, United States
6 June 2024
16:00

| Gracie FC | v | La Bombonera |

WakeMed Soccer Park Field 4, Cary, North Carolina, United States

==== Group E ====
| Pos | Team | Pld | W | L | GF | GA | GD | Qualification |
|---|---|---|---|---|---|---|---|---|
| 1 | Dueling for Lincoln F.C. | 3 | 3 | 0 | 9 | 4 | +5 | Knockout stage |
| 2 | The Town FC | 3 | 2 | 1 | 10 | 6 | +4 | Knockout stage |
| 3 | Borussia Dortmund | 3 | 1 | 2 | 6 | 11 | −5 | |
| 4 | FC Bayern | 3 | 0 | 3 | 2 | 6 | −4 | |

Updated to match(es) played on 5 June 2024. Source: TST
5 June 2024
9:00

| FC Bayern | 0–1 | Dueling for Lincoln F.C. |
|---|---|---|
| | | Westermann 51' |

WakeMed Soccer Park Field 6, Cary, North Carolina, United States
5 June 2024
9:00

| Borussia Dortmund | 2–5 | The Town FC |
|---|---|---|
| Großkreutz 24'; Balyeat 27' | | Bashti 3'; Bowen 15'; Guadarrama 18', 48'; Morrell 33' |

WakeMed Soccer Park Field 7, Cary, North Carolina, United States

5 June 2024
16:30

| Dueling for Lincoln F.C. | 3–2 | The Town FC |
|---|---|---|
| Ocampo 16'; Falsone 31'; Bement 50' | | Guadarrama 1'; Burgos 9' |

WakeMed Soccer Park Field 3, Cary, North Carolina, United States
5 June 2024
17:00

| FC Bayern | 1–2 | Borussia Dortmund |
|---|---|---|
| Contento 22' | | Leitner 6'; Barrios 51' |

WakeMed Soccer Park Field 2, Cary, North Carolina, United States

6 June 2024
14:30

| Borussia Dortmund | 2–5 | Dueling for Lincoln F.C. |

WakeMed Soccer Park Field 2, Cary, North Carolina, United States
6 June 2024
14:30

| FC Bayern | 1–3 | The Town FC |

WakeMed Soccer Park Field 3, Cary, North Carolina, United States

==== Group F ====
| Pos | Team | Pld | W | L | GF | GA | GD | Qualification |
|---|---|---|---|---|---|---|---|---|
| 1 | FC Roha Eagles | 3 | 2 | 1 | 8 | 7 | +1 | Knockout stage |
| 2 | Wrexham Red Dragons | 3 | 2 | 1 | 6 | 6 | 0 | Knockout stage |
| 3 | Saturdays Football | 3 | 1 | 2 | 5 | 5 | 0 | |
| 4 | Desimpedidos | 3 | 1 | 2 | 6 | 7 | −1 | |

Updated to match(es) played on 6 June 2024. Source: TST
5 June 2024
10:15

| Wrexham Red Dragons | 2–4 | FC Roha Eagles |
|---|---|---|
| Boyd 29'; Hooper 31' | | Neziri 2'; Kayantas 10', 51'; Rama 30' |

WakeMed Soccer Park Championship Field, Cary, North Carolina, United States
5 June 2024
10:15

| Desimpedidos | 1–3 | Saturdays Football |
|---|---|---|
| Team 39' (o.g.) | | Naglestad 21', 41'; Fernandez 31' |

WakeMed Soccer Park Field 5, Cary, North Carolina, United States

5 June 2024
18:00

| Wrexham Red Dragons | 1–0 | Saturdays Football |
|---|---|---|
| Boyd 44' |

WakeMed Soccer Park Field 3, Cary, North Carolina, United States
5 June 2024
18:45

| Desimpedidos | 3–1 | FC Roha Eagles |
|---|---|---|
| L. Silva 5'; Roha Eagles 35' (o.g.); A. Nascimento 54' | | Kayantas 9' |

WakeMed Soccer Park Field 5, Cary, North Carolina, United States

6 June 2024
17:00

| Wrexham Red Dragons | 3-2 | Desimpedidos |

WakeMed Soccer Park Field 2, Cary, North Carolina, United States
6 June 2024
17:00

| Saturdays Football | 2-3 | FC Roha Eagles |

WakeMed Soccer Park Field 6, Cary, North Carolina, United States

==== Group G ====
| Pos | Team | Pld | W | L | GF | GA | GD | Qualification |
|---|---|---|---|---|---|---|---|---|
| 1 | Newtown Pride FC | 3 | 3 | 0 | 10 | 1 | +9 | Knockout stage |
| 2 | Supra United FC | 3 | 2 | 1 | 4 | 2 | +2 | Knockout stage |
| 3 | ZALA | 3 | 1 | 2 | 4 | 7 | −3 | |
| 4 | DC Hyper | 3 | 0 | 3 | 2 | 10 | −8 | |

Updated to match(es) played on 5 June 2024. Source: TST
5 June 2024
10:00

| Newtown Pride FC | 4–0 | DC Hyper |
|---|---|---|
| Perez 13'; De Andrade 21'; Ganzer 37'; Costa 59' |

WakeMed Soccer Park Field 3, Cary, North Carolina, United States
5 June 2024
10:00

| ZALA | 0–1 | Supra United |
|---|---|---|
| | | Montesdeoca 100' |

WakeMed Soccer Park Field 4, Cary, North Carolina, United States

5 June 2024
17:15

| Newtown Pride FC | 2–0 | Supra United |
|---|---|---|
| Perez 21'; Ganzer 58' |

WakeMed Soccer Park Field 5, Cary, North Carolina, United States
5 June 2024
17:30

| ZALA | 3–2 | DC Hyper |
|---|---|---|
| Nguyen 9', 28', 62' | | Elsayed 2'; Da Silva 52' |

WakeMed Soccer Park Field 7, Cary, North Carolina, United States

6 June 2024
11:30

| Supra United | 3–0 | DC Hyper |
|---|---|---|
| Montesdeoca 2'; Beltran 15', 44' |

WakeMed Soccer Park Field 2, Cary, North Carolina, United States
6 June 2024
11:30

| Newtown Pride FC | 4–1 | ZALA |
|---|---|---|
| Perez 19'; Ganzer 28'; Marques 40'; Palmer 63' | | Romero 32' |

WakeMed Soccer Park Field 3, Cary, North Carolina, United States

==== Group H ====
| Pos | Team | Pld | W | L | GF | GA | GD | Qualification |
|---|---|---|---|---|---|---|---|---|
| 1 | Kwik Goal FC | 2 | 2 | 0 | 13 | 4 | +9 | Knockout stage |
| 2 | Sneaky Fox FC | 2 | 1 | 1 | 4 | 6 | −2 | Knockout stage |
| 3 | Pasha Luxury FC | 2 | 1 | 1 | 5 | 5 | 0 | |
| 4 | Tranqui10 FC | 2 | 0 | 2 | 5 | 12 | −7 | |

Updated to match(es) played on 5 June 2024. Source: TST
5 June 2024
13:15

| Sneaky Fox FC | 3–2 | Pasha Luxury FC |
|---|---|---|
| Perera 46'; Cox 48'; Toth 49' | | Holmes 18'; Perez 35' |

WakeMed Soccer Park Field 1, Cary, North Carolina, United States
5 June 2024
13:15

| KwikGoal FC | 9–3 | Tranqui10 FC |
|---|---|---|
| Giovinco 3', 16', 31'; Francis 12', 21'; Elezaj 38'; Nigro 39'; Araujo 40'; Melo 63' | | Diegues 41'; Dantas 43', 58' |

WakeMed Soccer Park Field 5, Cary, North Carolina, United States

5 June 2024
22:00

| Sneaky Fox FC | 1–4 | KwikGoal FC |
|---|---|---|
| Accam 12' | | Giovinco 20', 31'; De Rosario 23'; Hoffman 49' |

WakeMed Soccer Park Field 1, Cary, North Carolina, United States
5 June 2024
22:00

| Pasha Luxury FC | 3–2 | Tranqui10 FC |
|---|---|---|
| Najem 46'; Abdellaoui 50', 50' | | Funk 14'; Mendoza 40' |

WakeMed Soccer Park Field 7, Cary, North Carolina, United States

6 June 2024
20:45

| KwikGoal FC | 3-2 | Pasha Luxury FC |

WakeMed Soccer Park Field 1, Cary, North Carolina, United States

Game was suspended 10 minutes into the first half due to lightning, and resumed to its conclusion from 23:20 on Field 3

6 June 2024
20:45

| Sneaky Fox FC | 3-4 | Tranqui10 FC |

WakeMed Soccer Park Field 6, Cary, North Carolina, United States

Game was suspended 10 minutes into the first half due to lightning, and resumed to its conclusion from 23:20 on Field 4

==== Group I ====
| Pos | Team | Pld | W | L | GF | GA | GD | Qualification |
|---|---|---|---|---|---|---|---|---|
| 1 | Manhattan Kickers FC | 2 | 2 | 0 | 7 | 3 | +4 | Knockout stage |
| 2 | Raleigh Rebels FC | 2 | 2 | 0 | 8 | 2 | +6 | Knockout stage |
| 3 | Hashtag United | 2 | 0 | 2 | 3 | 5 | −2 | |
| 4 | Summer of Soccer | 2 | 0 | 2 | 2 | 10 | −8 | |

Updated to match(es) played on 5 June 2024. Source: TST
5 June 2024
13:00

| Hashtag United | 2–3 | Raleigh Rebels |
|---|---|---|
| Wooldridge 14'; Restrepo 37' | | Otoo 34'; Duvernay 43'; Robinson 46' |

WakeMed Soccer Park Field 3, Cary, North Carolina, United States
5 June 2024
13:00

| Manhattan Kickers | 5–2 | Summer of Soccer |
|---|---|---|
| Moreno 10', 26'; Nezaj 17', 26'; Fathazada 77' | | Watson 7'; Aguilar 18' |

WakeMed Soccer Park Field 4, Cary, North Carolina, United States

5 June 2024
20:15

| Hashtag United | 1–2 | Manhattan Kickers |
|---|---|---|
| Anderson 39' | | Moreno 20'; Denaire 65' |

WakeMed Soccer Park Field 5, Cary, North Carolina, United States
5 June 2024
20:30

| Raleigh Rebels | 5–0 | Summer of Soccer |
|---|---|---|
| Otoo 11'; Eloundou 12'; Eyang 25', 39'; Robinson 48' |

WakeMed Soccer Park Field 7, Cary, North Carolina, United States

6 June 2024
18:00

| Raleigh Rebels | v | Manhattan Kickers |

WakeMed Soccer Park Field 5, Cary, North Carolina, United States
6 June 2024
18:00

| Hashtag United | v | Summer of Soccer |

WakeMed Soccer Park Field 7, Cary, North Carolina, United States

==== Group J ====
| Pos | Team | Pld | W | L | GF | GA | GD | Qualification |
|---|---|---|---|---|---|---|---|---|
| 1 | Como-Cagliari | 3 | 2 | 1 | 7 | 4 | +3 | Knockout stage |
| 2 | Villareal CF | 3 | 2 | 1 | 7 | 6 | +1 | Knockout stage |
| 3 | North Carolina FC | 3 | 2 | 1 | 8 | 8 | 0 | |
| 4 | City Soccer Society FC | 3 | 0 | 3 | 4 | 8 | −4 | |

Updated to match(es) played on 5 June 2024. Source: TST
5 June 2024
11:30

| North Carolina FC | 4–3 | Villareal CF |
|---|---|---|
| Farber 4', 36'; Albadawi 33', 69' | | Escobedo 12'; Verza 22'; Nadal 66' |

WakeMed Soccer Park Field 4, Cary, North Carolina, United States
5 June 2024
11:45

| Como-Cagliari | 3–1 | City Soccer Society FC |
|---|---|---|
| Najemedine 17'; Jack 25'; Simonetta 55' | | Ochoa 22' |

WakeMed Soccer Park Field 5, Cary, North Carolina, United States

5 June 2024
19:30

| Como-Cagliari | 1–2 | Villarreal CF |
|---|---|---|
| Mazzaglia 22' | | Nadal 8'; Escobedo 59' |

WakeMed Soccer Park Field 3, Cary, North Carolina, United States
5 June 2024
20:00

| North Carolina FC | 3–2 | City Soccer Society FC |
|---|---|---|
| Chiles 14'; Heinemann 22', 43' | | Peralta 18', 33' |

WakeMed Soccer Park Field 4, Cary, North Carolina, United States

6 June 2024
13:00

| North Carolina FC | 1–3 | Como-Cagliari |
|---|---|---|
| Farber 30' | | Bolzan 12'; Marcolini 32'; Simonetta 44' |

WakeMed Soccer Park Field 3, Cary, North Carolina, United States
6 June 2024
13:00

| Villareal CF | 2–1 | City Soccer Society FC |
|---|---|---|
| Escobedo 29'; Romero 42' | | Co. Rezende 17' |

WakeMed Soccer Park Championship Field, Cary, North Carolina, United States

==== Group K ====
| Pos | Team | Pld | W | L | GF | GA | GD | Qualification |
|---|---|---|---|---|---|---|---|---|
| 1 | Hoosier Army | 2 | 2 | 0 | 9 | 2 | +7 | Knockout stage |
| 2 | Freedom United SC | 2 | 1 | 1 | 7 | 4 | +3 | Knockout stage |
| 3 | Hoya Nation | 2 | 1 | 1 | 3 | 4 | −1 | |
| 4 | Trident FC | 2 | 0 | 2 | 3 | 12 | −9 | |

Updated to match(es) played on 5 June 2024. Source: TST
5 June 2024
10:30

| Hoya Nation | 2–1 | Freedom United SC |
|---|---|---|
| Beer 34'; Nealis 108' | | Neacsu 9' |

WakeMed Soccer Park Field 7, Cary, North Carolina, United States
5 June 2024
10:30

| Hoosier Army | 6–1 | Trident FC |
|---|---|---|
| Moore 14'; Kotlov 21'; Panchot 28'; Thomas 36'; Catalano 37'; Ahlinvi 45' | | Holmen 34' |

WakeMed Soccer Park Field 6, Cary, North Carolina, United States

5 June 2024
18:45

| Freedom United SC | 6–2 | Trident FC |
|---|---|---|
| Dexter 6'; Bone 21'; Alves 24'; Dewing 26', 31'; Neacsu 49' | | Futagaki 12'; Kratz 32' |

WakeMed Soccer Park Field 6, Cary, North Carolina, United States
5 June 2024
19:00

| Hoosier Army | 3–1 | Hoya Nation |
|---|---|---|
| Bushue 7'; Ahlinvi 16'; Thompson 53' | | C'deBaca 17' |

WakeMed Soccer Park Field 7, Cary, North Carolina, United States

6 June 2024
19:30

| Hoya Nation | v | Trident FC |

WakeMed Soccer Park Field 7, Cary, North Carolina, United States
6 June 2024
19:30

| Hoosier Army | v | Freedom United SC |

WakeMed Soccer Park Field 5, Cary, North Carolina, United States

==== Group L ====
| Pos | Team | Pld | W | L | GF | GA | GD | Qualification |
|---|---|---|---|---|---|---|---|---|
| 1 | Toronto Athletic FC | 2 | 2 | 0 | 9 | 4 | +5 | Knockout stage |
| 2 | Sire 7 | 2 | 1 | 1 | 7 | 6 | +1 | Knockout stage |
| 3 | Tenfifteen FC | 2 | 1 | 1 | 2 | 3 | −1 | |
| 4 | Kingdom FC | 2 | 0 | 2 | 0 | 5 | −5 | |

Updated to match(es) played on 5 June 2024. Source: TST
5 June 2024
12:00

| Toronto Athletic FC | 4–0 | Kingdom FC |
|---|---|---|
| Graham, Rose; Ssebeduka |

WakeMed Soccer Park Field 7, Cary, North Carolina, United States
5 June 2024
12:00

| Sire Seven | 3–1 | Tenfifteen FC |
|---|---|---|
| Thiam 7'; Sako 37'; Niasse 50' | | Garcia 39' |

WakeMed Soccer Park Field 6, Cary, North Carolina, United States

5 June 2024
21:00

| Kingdom FC | 0–1 | Tenfifteen FC |
|---|---|---|
| | | Muroni 43' |

WakeMed Soccer Park Field 4, Cary, North Carolina, United States
5 June 2024
21:00

| Sire Seven | 4–5 | Toronto Athletic FC |
|---|---|---|
| Huddlestone 18', 40'; Niasse 29'; Imbula 30' | | Chamale 51'; Ssebeduka 51'; Graham 53'; Rios 56'; Suarez 57' |

WakeMed Soccer Park Field 3, Cary, North Carolina, United States

6 June 2024
16:30

| Toronto Athletic FC | v | Tenfifteen FC |

WakeMed Soccer Park Field 7, Cary, North Carolina, United States
6 June 2024
16:30

| Sire Seven | v | Kingdom FC |

WakeMed Soccer Park Field 5, Cary, North Carolina, United States

=== Knockout stage ===
Round of 32
A1 | Nani FC | 2
3H (Gp H) | Sneaky Fox FC | 1
D2 | Gracie FC | 2
E2 | The Town | 4
I1 | Manhattan Kickers | 1
L2 | Sire 7 | 4
H1 | Kwik Goal FC | 1
3A (Gp J) | North Carolina FC | 2
B1 | Reggae Rovers | 3
3G (Gp C) | Tobacco Road FC | 2
F2 | Wrexham Red Dragons | 6
C2 | Socceroof | 0
G1 | Newtown Pride FC | 3
3B (Gp I) | Hashtag United | 0
J1 | Como-Cagliari | 4
K2 | Hoya Nation | 2
E1 | Dueling for Lincoln FC | 0
3D (Gp F) | Saturdays Football | 3
L1 | Toronto Athletic | 2
I2 | Raleigh Rebels FC | 5
A2 | La Mexicana Express | 1
H2 | Pasha Luxury FC | 4
D1 | La Bombonera | 4
3E (Gp A) | Say Word FC | 2
C1 | Fitbodega Vancouver | 2
3F (Gp L) | Tenfifteen FC | 3
B2 | Concafa SC | 3
G2 | Supra United FC | 2
K1 | Hoosier Army | 4
J2 | Villarreal CF | 0
F1 | FC Roha Eagles | 1
3C (Gp K) | Freedom United SC | 4

Round of 16
Nani FC | 6
The Town FC | 3
Sire 7 | 4
North Carolina | 2
Reggae Rovers | 5
Wrexham Red Dragons | 1
Newtown Pride FC | 3
Como-Cagliari | 2
Saturdays Football | 2
Raleigh Rebels FC | 0
Pasha Luxury FC | 0
La Bombonera | 6
Tenfifteen FC | 1
Concafa | 2
Hoosier Army | 2
Freedom United | 0

Quarterfinals
Nani FC | 7
Sire 7 | 3
Reggae Rovers | 2
Newtown Pride FC | 3
Saturdays Football | 1
La Bombonera | 4
Concafa SC | 0
Hoosier Army | 1

Semifinals
Nani FC | 2
Newtown Pride FC | 1
La Bombonera | 3
Hoosier Army | 1

Finals
Nani FC | 0
La Bombonera | 4

== Women's tournament ==
The Soccer Tournament 2024 – Women's tournament
Tournament details
- Country: United States
- Venue: WakeMed Soccer Park
- Dates: 7 June—10 June
- Teams: 8
- All statistics correct as of 22 May 2024.

The women's tournament consisted of eight teams in two groups of four.

=== Group stage ===
==== Group A ====
| Pos | Team | Pld | W | L | GF | GA | GD | Qualification |
|---|---|---|---|---|---|---|---|---|
| 1 | Streetball FC Canada | 3 | 2 | 1 | 6 | 4 | +2 | Knockout stage |
| 2 | US Women | 3 | 2 | 1 | 7 | 6 | +1 | Knockout stage |
| 3 | Angel City 7s | 3 | 2 | 1 | 6 | 5 | +1 | |
| 4 | Wrexham Red Dragons | 3 | 0 | 3 | 5 | 9 | −4 | |

Updated to match(es) played on 22 May 2024. Source: TST
7 June 2024
12:00

| US Women | 0–3 | Streetball FC Canada |
|---|---|---|
| | Report |

WakeMed Soccer Park Field 2, Cary, North Carolina, United States
7 June 2024
12:30

| Wrexham Red Dragons | 1–3 | Angel City 7s |
|---|---|---|
| | Report |

WakeMed Soccer Park Field 3, Cary, North Carolina, United States

7 June 2024
19:30

| US Women | 3–0 | Angel City 7s |
|---|---|---|
| | Report |

WakeMed Soccer Park Field 2, Cary, North Carolina, United States
7 June 2024
21:00

| Wrexham Red Dragons | 1–2 | Streetball FC Canada |
|---|---|---|
| | Report |

WakeMed Soccer Park Field 3, Cary, North Carolina, United States

8 June 2024
20:00

| Angel City 7s | 3–1 | Streetball FC Canada |
|---|---|---|
| | Report |

WakeMed Soccer Park Field 4, Cary, North Carolina, United States
8 June 2024
20:00

| US Women | 4–3 | Wrexham Red Dragons |
|---|---|---|
| | Report |

WakeMed Soccer Park Field 2, Cary, North Carolina, United States

==== Group B ====
| Pos | Team | Pld | W | L | GF | GA | GD | Qualification |
|---|---|---|---|---|---|---|---|---|
| 1 | Tampa Bay Sun FC | 3 | 2 | 1 | 10 | 6 | +4 | Knockout stage |
| 2 | North Carolina Courage | 3 | 2 | 1 | 9 | 8 | +1 | Knockout stage |
| 3 | Burnley FC | 3 | 1 | 2 | 7 | 9 | −2 | |
| 4 | Soccerhead FC | 3 | 1 | 2 | 5 | 8 | −3 | |

Updated to match(es) played on 22 May 2024. Source: TST
7 June 2024
9:30

| North Carolina Courage | 2–1 | Burnley FC |
|---|---|---|
| | Report |

WakeMed Soccer Park Field 5, Cary, North Carolina, United States
7 June 2024
10:15

| Soccerhead FC | 1–0 | Tampa Bay Sun FC |
|---|---|---|
| | Report |

WakeMed Soccer Park Field 3, Cary, North Carolina, United States

7 June 2024
18:15

| Burnley FC | 3–1 | Soccerhead FC |
|---|---|---|
| | Report |

WakeMed Soccer Park Field 4, Cary, North Carolina, United States
7 June 2024
20:15

| North Carolina Courage | 2–4 | Tampa Bay Sun FC |
|---|---|---|
| | Report |

WakeMed Soccer Park Field 5, Cary, North Carolina, United States

8 June 2024
17:00

| North Carolina Courage | 5–3 | Soccerhead FC |
|---|---|---|
| | Report |

WakeMed Soccer Park Field 4, Cary, North Carolina, United States
8 June 2024
17:30

| Burnley FC | 3–6 | Tampa Bay Sun FC |
|---|---|---|
| | Report |

WakeMed Soccer Park Field 3, Cary, North Carolina, United States

=== Knockout stage ===
Semifinals
Streetball FC Canada | 0
North Carolina Courage | 2
Tampa Bay Sun FC | 0
US Women | 4

Finals
North Carolina Courage | 3
US Women | 6

== Broadcasting ==
ESPN announced that they will be streaming 27 matches throughout the course of the tournament.
