= The Soccer Tournament =

Association football tournament held in the United States

- Current season, competition or edition: The Soccer Tournament 2026
- Sport: Association football (7-on-7)
- Founded: 2023
- Founder: Jon Mugar; Dan Friel
- Owners: TBT Enterprises, LLC
- CEO: Jon Mugar
- Motto: $1 million prize, winner-take-all.
- No. of teams: 48 (men); 16 (women)
- Countries: United States
- Headquarters: Boston, Massachusetts
- Most recent champions: Men: Bumpy Pitch F.C. Women: US Women (2025)
- Most titles: US Women (2 titles)
- Broadcasters: NBC Sports (2023); ESPN (2024-present)
- Streaming partners: Peacock, YouTube, Facebook Watch
- Tournament format: Multi-stage tournament
- Website: tst7v7.com

Notes
- Tournaments: 2023 * 2024 * 2025 * 2026

The Soccer Tournament (TST) is a seven-a-side association football tournament played in the United States, established by TBT Enterprises, creator of The Basketball Tournament (TBT). TST was announced on October 11, 2022 to feature 32 teams with a $1 million winner-take-all prize. TST is partly owned by former basketball point guard Chris Paul.

== Format ==
Matches are played on a reduced-size (65 by 45 yards (59 m × 41 m)) football pitch with slightly smaller goals than normal and consist of 20-minute halves. The Elam Ending, arguably TBT's most iconic feature, has been adapted to a soccer setting; after the end of the second half, the remainder of the match consists of "Target Score Time", with the target score being set by adding one goal to the leading (or tied) team's score, i.e. if a game is standing at 3–1 after full-time, the target score will be set to 4. The game ends once the target score is reached by either team. If the target is not reached after a certain amount of time, one outfield player from each team exits the field until only two are left on each team, with the process repeating at regular intervals until the winning goal is scored.

Additional rule changes compared to regulation football include the prohibition of sliding tackles, the prohibition of punting or drop-kicks by goalkeepers, throw-ins being replaced by indirect free kicks, rolling substitutions, and the absence of offside.

== Teams ==
Teams to the tournament usually feature a mix of retired, active, and junior players, as well as a number of sportspeople from other sports: Retired players taking part included Ali Krieger, Sergio Agüero and Nani while people from other sports included former American football players Pat McAfee and Chad Ochocinco Johnson, RCD Mallorca minority partner Steve Nash, and Burnley F.C. minority partner J. J. Watt.

While teams often bear the brand or a variation of the brand of an existing football team, there is no restriction for players taking part ever to have had any relationship with the existing team: for example, the team delegated by Wrexham A.F.C. in 2024, called the "Wrexham Red Dragons", included both current goalkeeper Mark Howard, former player Lee Trundle, and Scottish international George Boyd, who had no former relationship with the team. Other teams may be fully amateur and may bear a fictional or new team name.

The inaugural tournament in 2023 featured both women's and men's teams, as well as some mixed-gender teams. Starting from 2024, women's teams were featured in a separate tournament; 2026 will feature a mixed tournament, with women's and men's teams alternating per quarter.

== Tournaments ==
Year	Date	Location	Men's final				Women's final			
Year	Date	Location	Winners	Score	Runners-up	No.	Winners	Score	Runners-up	No.
2023	June 1–4	WakeMed Soccer Park, Cary, NC	Newtown Pride FC	2–0	SLC FC	32	Combined tournament			
2024	June 5–10	WakeMed Soccer Park, Cary, NC	La Bombonera	4–0	Nani FC	48	US Women	6–3	North Carolina Courage	8
2025	June 4–9	WakeMed Soccer Park, Cary, NC	Bumpy Pitch F.C. Men's	2–1	Pumas de Alabama	48	US Women	3–0	Bumpy Pitch F.C. Women's	16
2026	May 27–June 1	WakeMed Soccer Park, Cary, NC	Hernandez United	3-2	Pumas de Alabama	48	Iowa Demon Hawks	2-1	Simply Futbol FC	16
