= The Soccer Tournament 2026 =

Football tournament in Cary, North Carolina

The Soccer Tournament 2026, also referred to as TST 2026, is the fourth annual edition of The Soccer Tournament. The tournament occurs from May 27 to June 1 2026 in Cary, North Carolina. There are three tournaments: men, women, and the inaugural mixed division. Each tournament has a $1 million prize for the winners.

== Men's Tournament ==
The Soccer Tournament 2026 – Men's tournament
Tournament details
- Country: United States
- Venue: WakeMed Soccer Park
- Dates: 27 May — 1 June
- Teams: 48

The men's tournament consisted of 48 teams, in twelve groups of four. The top 2 teams of each group and the top 8 highest standing third place teams automatically advance to the knockout stage.

=== Group Stage ===
All times are local (UTC−05:00).

==== Group A ====
Pos	Team	Pld	W	L	GF	GA	GD	Qualification
1	Legio FC	3	2	1	8	5	+3	Knockout stage
2	Bumpy Pitch FC	3	2	1	11	9	+2	Knockout stage
3	LCF Academy	3	2	1	9	7	+2	Knockout stage
4	Cardinal Legacy (Stanford Alumni)	3	0	3	5	12	−7	

Source: TST
27 May 2026
11:15

Bumpy Pitch FC	4-3	Cardinal Legacy
Stinson 4'; Gonzalez 19'; Borja 36'; Herrera 50'		Baltazar 24'; Arce 26'; Panchot 32', 36', 46'

WakeMed Soccer Park Field 7, Cary, North Carolina, United States

27 May 2026
11:15

Legio FC	2-1	LCF Academeny
Fofana 6'; Do Nascimento 55'		Gallego (Own Goal) 22'

WakeMed Soccer Park Field 6, Cary, North Carolina, United States

27 May 2026
20:30

Bumpy Pitch FC	4-1	Legio FC
Perez 3'; Gonzalez 21'; Lara 35'; Gutierrez 59'		Fofana 5'

WakeMed Soccer Park Field 4, Cary, North Carolina, United States

27 May 2026
20:45

LCF Academy	3-2	Cardinal Legacy
Cappellini 5', 37'; Günay 35'		Purchase 9'; Panchot 21'

WakeMed Soccer Park Field 5, Cary, North Carolina, United States

28 May 2026
22:00

Bumpy Pitch FC	3-5	LCF Academy
Perez 31'; Lara 49'; Gonzalez 52'		Bumpy Pitch FC Own Goal 7'; Vidal 23'; Sumbunu 29'; Günay 35'; Salihamidzic 54'

WakeMed Soccer Park Field 2, Cary, North Carolina, United States

28 May 2026
22:00

Cardinal Legacy	0-5	Legio FC
		Zirari 2', 40'; Djellab 11'; Fofana 16'; Quintana 36'

WakeMed Soccer Park Field 5, Cary, North Carolina, United States

==== Group B ====
Pos	Team	Pld	W	L	GF	GA	GD	Qualification
1	Hernandez United	3	3	0	13	4	+9	Knockout stage
2	La Mexicana Express	3	2	1	9	6	+3	Knockout stage
3	Pumas De Alabama	3	1	2	8	5	+3	Knockout stage
4	Piece of Cake FC	3	0	3	2	17	−15	

Source: TST
27 May 2026
09:45

Pumas De Alabama	5-0	Piece of Cake
Georgana 12', 20'; Vallejo 13'; Rios 22'; Bocanegra 43'

WakeMed Soccer Park Field 6, Cary, North Carolina, United States

27 May 2026
09:45

Hernandez United	4-1	La Mexicana Express
Marquez 10'; Agurcia 32'; Tamay 34'; Navarro 39'		Lopez 7'

WakeMed Soccer Park Field 7, Cary, North Carolina, United States

27 May 2026
19:00

Piece of Cake	0-5	La Mexican Express
		Guzman 15'; Zepeda 21'; Meneses 23'; Varillas 25'; Pena 42'

WakeMed Soccer Park Field 4, Cary, North Carolina, United States

27 May 2026
19:00

Pumas De Alabama	1-2	Hernandez United
Georgana 47'		Eyang 18'; Espinoza 48'

WakeMed Soccer Park Field 7, Cary, North Carolina, United States

28 May 2026
14:30

Hernandez United	7-2	Piece of Cake FC
Tamay 5'; Pérez 8'; Navarro 12'; Marquez 15'; Romero 20'; Espinoza 36'; Poarch 50'		Maras 9'; Besovic 46'

WakeMed Soccer Park Field 5, Cary, North Carolina, United States

28 May 2026
14:30

Pumas De Alabama0	2-3	La Mexicana Express
Gomez 1'; Magaña 25'		Varillas 14', 46'; Ramirez 52'

WakeMed Soccer Park Field 3, Cary, North Carolina, United States

==== Group C ====
Pos	Team	Pld	W	L	GF	GA	GD	Qualification
1	Kings League All-Stars	3	3	0	17	1	+16	Knockout stage
2	KRÜ FC	3	2	1	9	9	0	Knockout stage
3	City Soccer FC	3	1	2	6	11	−5	
4	Dark Horse NC United	3	0	3	2	13	−11	

Source: TST
27 May 2026
11:00

Kings League All Stars	6-1	City Soccer FC
Pardo 6'; Nunes 13', 35'; Cekic 14', 34'; Clase 37'		Denilson 20'

WakeMed Soccer Park Field 3, Cary, North Carolina, United States

27 May 2026
11:00

KRÜ FC	4-2	Dark Horse NC
Reyna 14'; Pelaz 32', 46'; Freire 34'		Lavielle 27'; Conger 37'

WakeMed Soccer Park Field 3, Cary, North Carolina, United States

27 May 2026
18:45

Kings League All-Stars	4-0	KRÜ FC
Vaz 19'; Nunes 22'; Yama 32'; Palomar 47'

WakeMed Soccer Park Field 1, Cary, North Carolina, United States

27 May 2026
20:15

City Soccer FC	2-0	Dark Horse NC United
Denilson 29'; Vidangossy 45'

WakeMed Soccer Park Field 6, Cary, North Carolina, United States

28 May 2026
16:00

KRÜ FC	5-3	City Soccer FC
Romero 4'; Gamarra 27'; Garcia 30', 46'; Zarate 35'		Herrera 25', 29'; Jiménez 46'

WakeMed Soccer Park Field 3, Cary, North Carolina, United States

28 May 2026
16:00

Kings League All-Stars	7-0	Dark Horse NC United
Pardo 16'; Soler 24'; Cekic 27'; Nunes 28', 35'; Yamna 30'; Vaz 47'

WakeMed Soccer Park Field 5, Cary, North Carolina, United States

==== Group D ====
Pos	Team	Pld	W	L	GF	GA	GD	Qualification
1	Genefit FC	3	3	0	10	6	+4	Knockout stage
2	Hoosier Army (IU Alumni)	3	2	1	11	8	+3	Knockout stage
3	TMT Chicago	3	1	2	7	7	0	Knockout stage
4	Tobacco Road FC	3	0	3	4	11	−7	

Source: TST
27 May 2026
12:45

Genefit FC	3-1	Tobacco Road FC
Flores 19'; Carriel 35'; Ledesma 44'		Pacius 23'

WakeMed Soccer Park Field 6, Cary, North Carolina, United States

27 May 2026
12:45

TMT Chicago	2-3	Hoosier Army
Ochoa 23'; Drazek 28'		Bruin 19', 42'; Kotlov 31'

WakeMed Soccer Park Field 7, Cary, North Carolina, United States

27 May 2026
22:30

TMT Chicago	3-1	Tobacco Road FC
Aguilera-Guillen 3'; Ruiz 13'; Ochoa 42'		Pacius 24'

WakeMed Soccer Park Field 5, Cary, North Carolina, United States

27 May 2026
22:30

Genefit FC	4-3	Hoosier Army
Ruiz 2'; Sanchez 16', 43'; Shea 42'		Panchot 7'; Bruin 13'; Ballek 20'

WakeMed Soccer Park Field 3, Cary, North Carolina, United States

28 May 2026
15:30

Hoosier Army	5-2	Tobacco Road FC
Bogard 7'; Ballek 21', 41'; Panchot 29'; Oduro 33'		Miller 24'; Jensen 25'

WakeMed Soccer Park Field 4, Cary, North Carolina, United States

28 May 2026
15:30

Genefit FC	3-2	TMT Chicago
Reget 8', 47'; Shea 25'		Walls 27'; Ruiz 45'

WakeMed Soccer Park Field 2, Cary, North Carolina, United States

==== Group E ====
Pos	Team	Pld	W	L	GF	GA	GD	Qualification
1	Drip FC	3	3	0	9	2	+7	Knockout stage
2	The 610	3	1	2	6	6	0	Knockout stage
3	Dreamville FC	3	1	2	4	7	−3	
4	Say Word FC	3	1	2	4	8	−4	

Source: TST
27 May 2026
08:30

Drip FC	5-0	Say Word FC
Coupland 7', 21', 41'; Ajagbe 7'; Santamaria 7'

WakeMed Soccer Park Field 5, Cary, North Carolina, United States

27 May 2026
09:30

Dreamville FC	3-2	The 610
Lambe 20'; Semedo 36'; Lopez 46'		Antonini 36', 39'

WakeMed Soccer Park Field 4, Cary, North Carolina, United States

27 May 2026
17:45

Drip FC	2-1	The 610
Coupland 12'; Ajagbe 43'		Nuredini 4'

WakeMed Soccer Park Field 3, Cary, North Carolina, United States

27 May 2026
20:45

Dreamville FC	0-3	Say Word FC
		Fares 11'; Hinds 36'; Mancuso 44'

WakeMed Soccer Park Field 3, Cary, North Carolina, United States

28 May 2026
19:00

The 610	3-1	Say Word FC
Bloyou 10', 23', 46'		Garner 25'

WakeMed Soccer Park Field 5, Cary, North Carolina, United States

28 May 2026
19:00

Dreamville FC	1-2	Drip FC
Vilhete 21'		Lampman 24'; Balyeat 41'

WakeMed Soccer Park Field 3, Cary, North Carolina, United States

==== Group F ====
Pos	Team	Pld	W	L	GF	GA	GD	Qualification
1	Furia FC	3	3	0	17	3	+14	Knockout stage
2	Rangers	3	2	1	8	7	+1	Knockout stage
3	Orlando Pirates FC	3	1	2	14	5	+9	Knockout stage
4	Real Athletico	3	0	3	2	26	−24	

Source: TST
27 May 2026
10:00

Orlando Pirates FC	2-3	Furia FC
Garcia 11'; Koert 39'		de Souza 6'; de Melo 20'; Mendonça 48'

WakeMed Soccer Park Field 2, Cary, North Carolina, United States

27 May 2026
10:00

Real Athletico	2-5	Rangers
Ascanio 38'; Nagy 41'		Yassin 3'; Brown 5', 10'; Gajic 36'; Camara 44'

WakeMed Soccer Park Field 5, Cary, North Carolina, United States

27 May 2026
17:15

Orlando Pirates FC	11-0	Real Athletico
Hendriks 5', 22', 22'; Garcia 11', 15', 27'; Koert 13', 21', 41'; May 24'; Gabuza 30'

WakeMed Soccer Park Field 6, Cary, North Carolina, United States

27 May 2026
20:30

Rangers	1-4	Furia FC
Brown 1'		D. de Melo 9'; Ilario 18'; J. de Melo 25'; Mendonça 43'

WakeMed Soccer Park Field 7, Cary, North Carolina, United States

28 May 2026
17:15

Orlando Pirates FC	1-2	Rangers
Dondolo 10'		Brown 37'; Daniels 49'

WakeMed Soccer Park Field 7, Cary, North Carolina, United States

28 May 2026
17:30

Furia FC	10-0	Real Athletico
Lima 2'; de Oliveira 7'; Gonçalves 9'; J. de Melo 13'; de Souza 24'; Chagas 25'; de Aguiar 31'; Mendonça 35'; Avelar 36'; de Silva 40'

WakeMed Soccer Park Field 5, Cary, North Carolina, United States

==== Group G ====
Pos	Team	Pld	W	L	GF	GA	GD	Qualification
1	Boca Dallas	3	3	0	11	2	+9	Knockout stage
2	La Bombonera	3	1	2	8	9	−1	Knockout stage
3	Charmour 410	3	1	2	6	9	−3	
4	Mint Hill FC	3	1	2	5	10	−5	

Source: TST
27 May 2026
08:00

La Bombonera	5-1	Charmour 410
Monsoniz 15'; Nolla 31'; Espinosa 34'; Carrera 35'; Amoedo 49'		Roberts 14'

WakeMed Soccer Park Field 3, Cary, North Carolina, United States

27 May 2026
08:00

Boca Dallas	4-0	Mint Hill FC
Gomes 10'; Nascimento 16'; Fabian 32'; Guiterrez 43'

WakeMed Soccer Park Field 4, Cary, North Carolina, United States

27 May 2026
17:30

Mint Hill FC	2-4	Charmour 410
Panton 3'; Bramusse 13', 13', 16'		Agnew 10'; Guarda 11'

WakeMed Soccer Park Field 4, Cary, North Carolina, United States

27 May 2026
17:45

Boca Dallas	5-1	La Bombonera
Guilherme 6', 40'; Castillo 24'; Nascimento 34'; Gomes 37'		Nolla 7'

WakeMed Soccer Park Field 5, Cary, North Carolina, United States

28 May 2026
15:45

La Bombonera	2-3	Mint Hill FC
Monsoniz 27'; Vergé 37'		Gardiner 4'; Grippi 31'; Venancio 44'

WakeMed Soccer Park Field 7, Cary, North Carolina, United States

28 May 2026
15:45

Boca Dallas	2-1	Charmour 410
Nascimento 10'; Rufino 48'		Bramusse 4'

WakeMed Soccer Park Field 6, Cary, North Carolina, United States

==== Group H ====
Pos	Team	Pld	W	L	GF	GA	GD	Qualification
1	Podpah Funkbol Clube	3	3	0	12	6	+6	Knockout stage
2	Kwik Goal FC	3	2	1	10	3	+7	Knockout stage
3	RG10 Football	3	1	2	10	15	−5	
4	Brown Ballers FC	3	0	3	6	14	−8	

Source: TST
27 May 2026
11:30

Podpah Funkbol Clube	5-4	RG10 Football
Silva 3', 18'; Reis 41'; Miranda 44'; Santos 51'		Campos 25'; Ndoye 28'; Pereira 32', 35'

WakeMed Soccer Park Field 5, Cary, North Carolina, United States

27 May 2026
12:30

Kwik Goal FC	4-0	Brown Ballers FC
Dantas 15'; Fernandes 20'; Pereria 31'; Araujo 40'

WakeMed Soccer Park Field 4, Cary, North Carolina, United States

27 May 2026
22:00

Kwik Goal FC	5-0	RG10 Football
Giovinco 4', 29'; Gorskie 17'; Fernandes 26'; Henrique 37'

WakeMed Soccer Park Field 1, Cary, North Carolina, United States

27 May 2026
22:00

Podpah Funkbol Clube	4-1	Brown Ballers FC
Paulo 3'; Silva 7'; Miranda 28'; Mensezes 39'		Bham 17'

WakeMed Soccer Park Field 6, Cary, North Carolina, United States

28 May 2026
20:30

Podpah Funkbol Clube	3-1	Kwik Goal FC
Alberto 23'; Souz 32'; Alexandre 40'		Carvalho 36'

WakeMed Soccer Park Field 1, Cary, North Carolina, United States

28 May 2026
20:30

RG10 Football	6-5	Brown Ballers FC
Pereira 26', 52'; Gudino 26', 34'; Pino 31'		Sandhu 30', 48'; Kayani 43', 51'; Bham 45'

WakeMed Soccer Park Field 5, Cary, North Carolina, United States

==== Group I ====
Pos	Team	Pld	W	L	GF	GA	GD	Qualification
1	Pasha Luxury FC	3	3	0	11	4	+7	Knockout stage
2	Wythenshawe Vets	3	2	1	7	7	0	Knockout stage
3	Dueling for Lincoln FC	3	1	2	9	12	−3	Knockout stage
4	Weiss OCFC	3	0	3	3	7	−4	

Source: TST
27 May 2026
08:15

Wythenshawe Vets	2-1	Weiss OCFC
Sambissa 41'; Schofield 46'		Morales 29'

WakeMed Soccer Park Field 7, Cary, North Carolina, United States

27 May 2026
09:30

Pasha Luxury FC	6-3	Dueling for Lincoln FC
Boutoutaou 2', 25'; Marcano 15'; Kodija 23'; Carlson 29'; Youssouf 44'		Stimac 32'; Sanchis 37'; Torrealba 41'

WakeMed Soccer Park Field 3, Cary, North Carolina, United States

27 May 2026
17:30

Weiss OCFC	1-2	Dueling for Lincoln FC
Stone 16'		Vera 37'; Bement 44'

WakeMed Soccer Park Field 7, Cary, North Carolina, United States

27 May 2026
20:15

Wythenshawe Vets	0-2	Pasha Luxury FC
		Shelvey 3'; Carlson 42'

WakeMed Soccer Park Field 2, Cary, North Carolina, United States

28 May 2026
18:45

Wythenshawe Vets	5-4	Dueling for Lincoln FC
Seedorf 3', 16'; Boyd 4', 42'; Sambissa 37'		Hassan 5'; Urie 12'; Torrealba 13'; Falsone 15'

WakeMed Soccer Park Field 7, Cary, North Carolina, United States

28 May 2026
18:45

Pasha Luxury FC	3-1	Weiss OCFC
Knockaert 17', 16'; Rufe 30'; Bennett 42'		Blume 6'

WakeMed Soccer Park Field 6, Cary, North Carolina, United States

==== Group J ====
Pos	Team	Pld	W	L	GF	GA	GD	Qualification
1	Fort Lauderdale Strikers	3	2	1	9	5	+4	Knockout stage
2	Cagliari Calcio	3	2	1	7	7	0	Knockout stage
3	Club América	3	2	1	6	7	−1	Knockout stage
4	Villarreal CF	3	0	3	4	7	−3	

Source: TST
27 May 2026
11:30

Club América	0-4	Fort Lauderdale Strikers
		Torbic 6'; Rivera 27'; Fuertes 34'; Bencherif 39'

WakeMed Soccer Park Field 1, Cary, North Carolina, United States

27 May 2026
12:30

Villarreal CF	1-2	Cagliari Calcio
Nadal 4'		Nainggolan 34', 37'

WakeMed Soccer Park Field 3, Cary, North Carolina, United States

27 May 2026
19:15

Villarreal CF	1-2	Fort Lauderdale Strikers
Marques 35'		Baranovsky 23'; Williams 48'

WakeMed Soccer Park Field 5, Cary, North Carolina, United States

27 May 2026
19:15

Club América	3-1	Cagliari Calcio
García 23'; Fuentes 35'; Rebollo 50'		Vinciguerra 14'

WakeMed Soccer Park Field 3, Cary, North Carolina, United States

28 May 2026
17:00

Cagliari Calcio	4-3	Fort Lauderdale Strikers
Sau 11'; Setti 13', 45'; Nainggolan 36'		Martinez 29'; Fuertes 29'; Arellano 31'

WakeMed Soccer Park Field 4, Cary, North Carolina, United States

28 May 2026
17:00

Club América	2-1	Villarreal CF
Rivera 3'; Rebollo 43'		Gaspar 4'

WakeMed Soccer Park Field 1, Cary, North Carolina, United States

==== Group K ====
Pos	Team	Pld	W	L	GF	GA	GD	Qualification
1	Tactical Manager Flo Sharks	3	2	1	7	5	+2	Knockout stage
2	FC Amarillo Bombers	3	2	1	6	5	+1	Knockout stage
3	Reggae Rovers FC	3	1	2	7	7	0	Knockout stage
4	Ambush Stars	3	1	2	5	8	−3	

Source: TST
27 May 2026
13:00

Ambush Stars	3-2	FC Amarillo Bombers
Crain 40'; O'Keefe 48'; Eskay 50'		Reyes 12'; Ahmadi 33'

WakeMed Soccer Park Field 5, Cary, North Carolina, United States

27 May 2026
13:00

Reggae Rovers FC	2-4	Tactical Manager Flo Sharks
Willis 35'; Wing 46'		da Silva 19'; Caetano 22'; de Lima 33', 46'

WakeMed Soccer Park Field 2, Cary, North Carolina, United States

27 May 2026
22:15

Reggae Rovers FC	1-2	FC Amarillo Bombers
Walsh 20'		Lopez 11'; Garcia 46'

WakeMed Soccer Park Field 4, Cary, North Carolina, United States

27 May 2026
22:15

Tactical Manager Flo Sharks	2-1	Ambush Stars
de Lima 31'; Rollemberg 42'		Banahan 10'

WakeMed Soccer Park Field 7, Cary, North Carolina, United States

28 May 2026
20:15

Reggae Rovers FC	4-1	Ambush Stars
Frater 4', 45'; Walsh 26'; Edwards 30'		Crabbe 20'

WakeMed Soccer Park Field 7, Cary, North Carolina, United States

28 May 2026
20:15

FC Amarillo Bombers	2-1	Tactical Manager Flo Sharks
Reyes 32'; Diaz 51'		Rollemberg 3'

WakeMed Soccer Park Field 6, Cary, North Carolina, United States

==== Group L ====
Pos	Team	Pld	W	L	GF	GA	GD	Qualification
1	Soccer Central	3	3	0	14	5	+9	Knockout stage
2	Freedom United SC	3	1	2	8	8	0	Knockout stage
3	Drunken Monkeys	3	1	2	7	10	−3	Knockout stage
4	Trident FC	3	1	2	5	11	−6	

Source: TST
27 May 2026
08:15

Freedom United SC	4-1	Drunken Monkeys
Slavov 8'; Rad 19'; Bawa 26'; Franz 32'		Alves 44'

WakeMed Soccer Park Field 6, Cary, North Carolina, United States

27 May 2026
08:30

Trident FC	0-6	Soccer Central
		Agiorre 11'; Rodrigo 12'; Skiltan 31'; Zordo 34', 48'; Castañeda 35'

WakeMed Soccer Park Field 1, Cary, North Carolina, United States

27 May 2026
17:15

Freedom United SC	3-5	Soccer Central
Franz 19'; Trager 28'; Morales 40'		Araiza 15'; Castañeda 16'; Casanaoba 24', 32'; Orozco 48'

WakeMed Soccer Park Field 1, Cary, North Carolina, United States

27 May 2026
18:45

Drunken Monkeys	4-3	Trident FC
Long 2', 39'; Alves 19'; Matthews 46'		O'Neil 2'; Favila 9'; Gannon 24'

WakeMed Soccer Park Field 6, Cary, North Carolina, United States

28 May 2026
21:45

Freedom United SC	1-2	Trident FC
Morales 20'		Ruiz 36': Davis 51'

WakeMed Soccer Park Field 7, Cary, North Carolina, United States

28 May 2026
21:45

Drunken Monkeys	2-3	Soccer Central
Ferdinand 22'; Long 37'		Ochoa 16'; Zordo 20'; Dos Santos 41'

WakeMed Soccer Park Field 6, Cary, North Carolina, United States

==== Ranking of Third Place Teams ====
Pos	Grp	Team	Pld	W	L	GF	GA	GD	Qualification
1	A	LCF Academy	3	2	1	9	7	+2	Knockout stage
2	J	Club America	3	2	1	6	7	−1	Knockout stage
3	F	Orlando Pirates FC	3	1	2	14	5	+9	Knockout stage
4	B	Pumas De Alabama	3	1	2	8	5	+3	Knockout stage
5	D	TMT Chicago	3	1	2	7	7	0	Knockout stage
6	K	Reggae Rovers FC	3	1	2	7	7	0	Knockout stage
7	I	Dueling for Lincoln FC	3	1	2	9	12	−3	Knockout stage
8	L	Drunken Monkeys	3	1	2	7	10	−3	Knockout stage
9	G	Charmour 410	3	1	2	6	9	−3	
10	E	Dreamville FC	3	1	2	4	7	−3	
11	H	RG10 Football	3	1	2	10	15	−5	
12	C	City Soccer FC	3	1	2	6	11	−5	

Source: TST

=== Men's Knockout Stage ===
Round of 32
A1	Legio FC	1
L3	Drunken Monkeys	2
D2	Hoosier Army	1
E2	The 610	2
I1	Pasha Luxury FC	2
L2	Freedom United SC	3
H1	Podpah Funkbol Clube	1
A3	LCF Academy	3
B1	Hernandez United	4
I3	Dueling for Lincoln FC	2
C2	Kru FC	2
F2	Rangers	1
G1	Boca Dallas	4
J3	Club America	0
J1	Fort Lauderdale Strikers	2
K2	FC Amarillo Strikers	1
E1	Drip FC	1
B3	Pumas De Alabama	3
L1	Soccer Central	3
I2	Wythenshawe Vets	2
A2	Bumpy Pitch FC	0
H2	Kwik Goal FC	5
D1	Genefit FC	2
D3	TMT Chicago	1
C1	Kings League All-Stars	5
K3	Reggae Rovers FC	2
B2	La Mexicana Express	1
G2	La Bombonera	2
K1	Tactical Manager Flo Sharks	3
J2	Cagliari Calcio	0
F1	Furia FC	4
F3	Orlando Pirates FC	2

Round of 16
Drunken Monkeys	2
The 610	1
Freedom United SC	2
LCF Academy	0
Hernandez United	4
Kru FC	2
Boca Dallas	1
Fort Lauderdale Strikers	0
Pumas De Alabama	4
Soccer Central	3
Kwik Goal FC	2
Genefit FC	1
Kings League All-Stars	3
La Bombonera	2
Tactical Manager Flo Sharks	1
Furia FC	2

Quarterfinals
Drunken Monkeys	1
Freedom United SC	3
Hernandez United	1
Boca Dallas	0
Pumas De Alabama	2
Kwik Goal FC	1
Kings League All-Stars	3
Furia FC	2

Semifinals
Freedom United SC	0
Hernandez United	2
Pumas de Alabama	2
Kings League All Stars	1

Finals
Hernandez United
Pumas de Alabama

=== Men's Round of 32 ===
29 May 2026
09:00

La Bombonera	2-1	La Mexicana Express
Hernandez 10'; Espinoza 60'		Ramirez 22'

WakeMed Soccer Park Field 3, Cary, North Carolina, United States

29 May 2026
10:00

KRÜ FC	2-1	Edmonton Rangers FC
Zarate 26'; Idrizi 48'		Boualouan 37'

WakeMed Soccer Park Field 3, Cary, North Carolina, United States

29 May 2026
10:15

Hoosier Army	1-2	The 610
Matthews 3'		Kossehasse 17'; Nuredini 49'

WakeMed Soccer Park Field 7, Cary, North Carolina, United States

29 May 2026
10:30

Hernandez United	4-2	Dueling for Lincoln FC
Márquez 4'; Espinoza 20'; Navarro 33'; Ramírez 44'		Sanchis 6'; Torrealba 15'

WakeMed Soccer Park Field 6, Cary, North Carolina, United States

29 May 2026
11:30

Genefit FC	2-1	TMT Chicago
Iloski 31'; Cortes 41'		Williams 26'

WakeMed Soccer Park Field 3, Cary, North Carolina, United States

29 May 2026
12:00

Furia FC	4-2	Orlando Pirates FC
Ilario 3', 19'; Chagas 25'; Aguiar 42'		Garcia 8'; Koert 24'

WakeMed Soccer Park Field 7, Cary, North Carolina, United States

29 May 2026
13:00

Kwik Goal FC	5-0	Bumpy Pitch FC
Dantas 4', 20'; Freitas 22'; Steinwascher 31'; Melo 46'

WakeMed Soccer Park Field 3, Cary, North Carolina, United States

29 May 2026
13:15

LCF Academy	3-1	Podpah Funkbol Clube
Günay 5'; Gallego 31'; Salihamidzic 47'		Alexandre 8'

WakeMed Soccer Park Field 6, Cary, North Carolina, United States

29 May 2026
16:45

Drip FC	1-3	Pumas De Alabama
Bader 5'		Georgana 13', 42'; Castillo 31'

WakeMed Soccer Park Field 6, Cary, North Carolina, United States

29 May 2026
17:30

Freedom United SC	3-2	Pasha Luxury FC
Trager 6'; Neacsu 32'; Morales 42'		Boutoutaou 7', 27'

WakeMed Soccer Park Field 3, Cary, North Carolina, United States

29 May 2026
18:15

Tactical Manager's Flo Sharks	3-0	Cagliari Calcio
Martins 19'; Christian 27'; da Silva 39'

WakeMed Soccer Park Field 6, Cary, North Carolina, United States

29 May 2026
18:30

Fort Lauderdale Strikers	2-1	FC Amarillo Bombers
Torbic 11'; Starikov 49'		Lopez 45'

WakeMed Soccer Park Field 7, Cary, North Carolina, United States

29 May 2026
17:30

Reggae Rovers	2-5	Kings League All Stars
Kelson 22'; Jones 49'		Vaz 4', 49'; Cekic 29'; Pardo 32'; Nunes 36'

WakeMed Soccer Park Field 2, Cary, North Carolina, United States

29 May 2026
21:15

Legio FC	1-2	Drunken Monkeys
Traore 4'		Matthews 21'; Skandari 41'

WakeMed Soccer Park Field 6, Cary, North Carolina, United States

29 May 2026
22:15

Club America	0-4	Boca Dallas
		Bolt 10'; Gomes 26'; Guiterrez 36'; Nascimento 43'

WakeMed Soccer Park Field 2, Cary, North Carolina, United States

=== Men's Round of 16 ===
30 May 2026
09:30

Soccer Central FC	3-4	Pumas de Alabama
Araiza 5'; Fattori 53'; Casanaoba 60'		Castillo 10' Rios 14' Cruz 14' Georgana 64'

WakeMed Soccer Park Field, Cary, North Carolina, United States

30 May 2026
09:45

Drunken Monkeys	2-1	The 610
Ferdinand 19'; Alves 48'		Vaccaro 47'

WakeMed Soccer Park Field, Cary, North Carolina, United States

30 May 2026
10:00

Tactical Manager's Flo Sharks	1-2	Furia FC
Christian 21'		Oliveira 42'; Ilario 45'

WakeMed Soccer Park Field, Cary, North Carolina, United States

30 May 2026
10:30

La Bombonera	2-3	Kings League All Stars
Espinosa 12', 41'		Palomar 16'; Nunes 29', 44'

WakeMed Soccer Park Field, Cary, North Carolina, United States

30 May 2026
11:15

Kwik Goal FC	2-1	Genefit FC
Dantas 12'; Steinwascher 42'		Reget 16'

WakeMed Soccer Park Field, Cary, North Carolina, United States

30 May 2026
12:30

Hernandez United	4-2	KRÜ FC
Román Ramírez 9', 42'; Espinoza 19'; Romero 25'		Freire 29'; Zarate 32'

WakeMed Soccer Park Field, Cary, North Carolina, United States

30 May 2026
13:00

LCF Academy	0-2	Freedom United SC
		Sims 30'; Morales 39'

WakeMed Soccer Park Field, Cary, North Carolina, United States

30 May 2026
13:00

Boca Dallas	1-0	Fort Lauderdale Strikers
Xavier 55'

WakeMed Soccer Park Field, Cary, North Carolina, United States

=== Men's Quarterfinals ===
30 May 2026
19:45

Kwik Goal FC	1-2	Pumas de Alabama
Fernandes 22'		Castillo 19' Georgana 56'

WakeMed Soccer Park Field 3, Cary, North Carolina, United States

30 May 2026
18:30

Freedom United SC	3-1	Drunken Monkeys
Chacon 13'; Bawa 24'; Morales 53'		Alves 11'

WakeMed Soccer Park Field 4, Cary, North Carolina, United States

30 May 2026
20:15

Boca Dallas	0-1	Hernandez United
		Ramírez 43'

WakeMed Soccer Park Field 5, Cary, North Carolina, United States

30 May 2026
21:00

Furia FC	2 - 3	Kings League All Stars
Ilario 5'; Avelar 27'		Antolinez 12'; Nunes 48', 52'

WakeMed Soccer Park Field 1, Cary, North Carolina, United States

=== Men's Semifinals ===
31 May 2026
14:30

Pumas de Alabama	2-1 Target Score: 2	Kings League All Stars
Magaña 22'; Georgana 51'		Pardo 56'

WakeMed Soccer Park Field 1, Cary, North Carolina, United States

31 May 2026
16:00

Freedom United SC	0-2 Target Score: 2	Hernandez United
		Ramírez 25'; Navarro 40'

WakeMed Soccer Park Field 1, Cary, North Carolina, United States

=== Men's Finals ===
1 June 2026
21:00

Hernandez United	3-2 Target Score: 3	Pumas de Alabama
Márquez 4'; Espinoza 22'; Escoto 55'		Magaña 20'; Georgana 54'

WakeMed Soccer Park Field 1, Cary, North Carolina, United States
Referee: John Freeman

== Women's Tournament ==
The Soccer Tournament 2026 – Women's tournament
Tournament details
- Country: United States
- Venue: WakeMed Soccer Park
- Dates: 28 May—1 June
- Teams: 16

The women's tournament consists of 16 teams, in four groups of four.

=== Women's Group Stage ===
All times are local (UTC−05:00).

==== Group A ====
Pos	Team	Pld	W	L	GF	GA	GD	Qualification
1	Kansas City II	3	2	1	8	2	+6	Knockout stage
2	US Women	3	2	1	6	4	+2	Knockout stage
3	Sportive FC	3	2	1	4	3	+1	
4	Club America	3	0	3	3	12	−9	

Source: TST
28 May 2026
17:15

Kansas City II	2-0	Sportive FC
Robbins 15'; Colbert 46'

WakeMed Soccer Park Field 6, Cary, North Carolina, United States

28 May 2026
17:30

US Women	4-2	Club América
Devey 4'; Blum 12'; Kimball 15'; Fletcher 41'		Luebbert 13'; Hernandez 38'

WakeMed Soccer Park Field 3, Cary, North Carolina, United States

29 May 2026
11:30

Club América	0-2	Sportive FC
		Kennedy 28', 40'

WakeMed Soccer Park Field 4, Cary, North Carolina, United States

29 May 2026
13:15

US Women	1-0	Kansas City II
Munson 43'

WakeMed Soccer Park Field 2, Cary, North Carolina, United States

29 May 2026
20:15

Kansas City II	6-1	Club América
Blaise 1', 15'; Hackler 20'; Hontz 20'; Colbert 20'; Clark 42'		Luebbert 20'

WakeMed Soccer Park Field 4, Cary, North Carolina, United States

29 May 2026
20:45

US Women	1-2	Sportive FC
Lloyd 37'		Pennie 11'; Mara 38'

WakeMed Soccer Park Field 1, Cary, North Carolina, United States

==== Group B ====
Pos	Team	Pld	W	L	GF	GA	GD	Qualification
1	City Soccer FC	3	3	0	8	3	+5	Knockout stage
2	Simply Futbol FC	3	2	1	7	6	+1	Knockout stage
3	Ultrain FC	3	1	2	5	6	−1	
4	Bumpy Pitch FC	3	0	3	4	9	−5	

Source: TST
28 May 2026
20:45

Bumpy Pitch FC	2-3	Ultrain FC
Anderson 6'; Whitham 28'		Brossard 9'; Evans 15'; Banks 42'

WakeMed Soccer Park Field 3, Cary, North Carolina, United States

28 May 2026
21:30

City Soccer FC	3-2	Simply Futbol FC
Karnley 15'; Atis 28'; Folds 45'		Tufts 6', 45'

WakeMed Soccer Park Field 4, Cary, North Carolina, United States

29 May 2026
08:45

Bumpy Pitch FC	0-3	City Soccer FC
		Oronoz 20', 50'; Dickerman 29'

WakeMed Soccer Park Field 1, Cary, North Carolina, United States

29 May 2026
08:45

Ultrain FC	1-2	Simply Futbol FC
Pelegrin 31'		Courtwright 39'; Tufts 44'

WakeMed Soccer Park Field 6, Cary, North Carolina, United States

29 May 2026
20:00

City Soccer FC	2-1	Ultrain FC
Miller 53'; Dickerman 54'		Kniskern 36'

WakeMed Soccer Park Field 7, Cary, North Carolina, United States

29 May 2026
21:00

Bumpy Pitch FC	2-3	Simply Futbol FC
Bello 8'; Anderson 35'		Dawn 35'; St. 39'; Tufts 45'

WakeMed Soccer Park Field 5, Cary, North Carolina, United States

==== Group C ====
Pos	Team	Pld	W	L	GF	GA	GD	Qualification
1	Rated Sports FC	3	3	0	10	3	+7	Knockout stage
2	Iowa Demon Hawks	3	2	1	5	4	+1	Knockout stage
3	NC Courage	3	1	2	5	8	−3	
4	Solo FC	3	0	3	3	8	−5	

Source: TST
28 May 2026
18:30

NC Courage	0-3	Iowa Demon Hawks
		Paola 19'; Andrade 27'; Yovhana 44'

WakeMed Soccer Park Field 4, Cary, North Carolina, United States

28 May 2026
18:30

Solo FC	1-3	Rated Sports
Martinez 45'		Thompson 2', 46'; Campbell 22'

WakeMed Soccer Park Field 2, Cary, North Carolina, United States

29 May 2026
11:45

Solo FC	1-2	Iowa Demon Hawks
De 17'		Paola 35', 53'

WakeMed Soccer Park Field 1, Cary, North Carolina, United States

29 May 2026
13:00

NC Courage	2-4	Rated Sports
Bader 23'; Keeley 30'		Blundell 2', 18', 45'; gomes 3'

WakeMed Soccer Park Field 4, Cary, North Carolina, United States

29 May 2026
21:45

Iowa Demon Hawks	0-3	Rated Sports
		Dennehy 12'; Walker 29'; Blundell 43'

WakeMed Soccer Park Field 4, Cary, North Carolina, United States

29 May 2026
22:00

Solo FC	1-3	NC Courage
Baumann 26'		Richter 18'; Bader 31'; Bumba 46'

WakeMed Soccer Park Field 3, Cary, North Carolina, United States

==== Group D ====
Pos	Team	Pld	W	L	GF	GA	GD	Qualification
1	Drunken Monkeys	3	2	1	6	3	+3	Knockout stage
2	Reunion City Dallas	3	2	1	7	5	+2	Knockout stage
3	Austin Rise FC	3	2	1	7	5	+2	
4	Speedy Turtles FC	3	0	3	2	9	−7	

Source: TST
28 May 2026
14:00

Reunion City Dallas	1-2	Drunken Monkeys
Hudson 41'		Mellado 34'; Pierson 44'

WakeMed Soccer Park Field 1, Cary, North Carolina, United States

28 May 2026
14:15

Austin Rise FC	3-1	Speedy Turtles FC
Doherty 23'; Galligan 34'; Schutt 40'		Young 11'

WakeMed Soccer Park Field 6, Cary, North Carolina, United States

29 May 2026
11:45

Speedy Turtles FC	1-3	Reunion City Dallas
Showler-Little 25'		Williams 9'; Cecil 33'; Leifried 44'

WakeMed Soccer Park Field 6, Cary, North Carolina, United States

29 May 2026
12:00

Austin Rise FC	2-1	Drunken Monkeys
Soukou 34'; Glenn 55'		Mellado 16'

WakeMed Soccer Park Field 5, Cary, North Carolina, United States

29 May 2026
19:30

Speedy Turtles FC	0-3	Drunken Monkeys
		Lazaro 20', 50'; Mellado 20'

WakeMed Soccer Park Field 5, Cary, North Carolina, United States

29 May 2026
19:45

Austin Rise FC	2-3	Reunion City Dallas
Rase 27', 34'		Tran 2'; Kessler 31'; Cecil 39'

WakeMed Soccer Park Field 6, Cary, North Carolina, United States

=== Women's knockout stage ===
Quarterfinals
A1	Kansas City II	1
C2	Iowa Demon Hawks	2
B1	City Soccer FC	3
D2	Reunion City Dallas	0
C1	Rated Sports	2
B2	Simply Futbol FC	4
D1	Drunken Monkeys	1
A2	US Women	4

Semifinals
Iowa Demon Hawks	3
City Soccer FC	1
Simply Futbol FC	2
US Women	1

Finals
Iowa Demon Hawks
Simply Futbol FC

=== Women's Quarterfinals ===
30 May 2026
18:00

Iowa Demon Hawks Women	2-1	Kansas City II
Paola 29', 51'		Gemelli 50'

WakeMed Soccer Park Field 1, Cary, North Carolina, United States

30 May 2026
18:15

City Soccer FC	3-0	Reunion City Dallas
Neal 2', 27'; Folds 52'

WakeMed Soccer Park Field 4, Cary, North Carolina, United States

30 May 2026
18:45

Simply Futbol FC	4-2	Rated Sports FC
Miller 13'; Courtwright 18'; Moore 21'; Tufts 52'		Ottey 3'; Briggs 50'

WakeMed Soccer Park Field 5, Cary, North Carolina, United States

30 May 2026
19:30

US Women	4-1	Drunken Monkeys
Devey 1'; Kimball 19', 39'; Ayscue 32'		Mellado 14'

WakeMed Soccer Park Field 1, Cary, North Carolina, United States

=== Women's Semifinals ===
31 May 2026
12:00

City Soccer FC	1-3 Target Score: 3	Iowa Demon Hawks
Karnley 38'		Maria 21'; Paola 32'; Pinheiro 51'

WakeMed Soccer Park Field 1, Cary, North Carolina, United States
31 May 2026
13:30

Simply Futbol FC	2-1 Target Score: 2	US Women
Razo 49'; Tufts 53'		Shim 36'

WakeMed Soccer Park Field 1, Cary, North Carolina, United States

=== Women's Finals ===
1 June 2026
19:20

Iowa Demon Hawks	v	Simply Futbol FC

WakeMed Soccer Park Field 1, Cary, North Carolina, United States

== Mixed Tournament ==
The Soccer Tournament 2026 – Women's tournament
Tournament details
- Country: United States
- Venue: WakeMed Soccer Park
- Dates: 29 May—1 June
- Teams: 12

The mixed tournament consists of 12 teams, in three groups of four. The top two teams in each group along with the next best two ranking third placed teams advanced to the knockout stage.

=== Mixed Group Stage ===
All times are local (UTC−05:00).

==== Mixed Group A ====
Pos	Team	Pld	W	L	GF	GA	GD	Qualification
1	Detroit City FC	3	3	0	10	1	+9	Knockout stage
2	Solo FC	3	2	1	5	7	−2	Knockout stage
3	Sneaky FC	3	1	2	3	5	−2	Knockout stage
4	Wrexham Red Dragons	3	0	3	2	7	−5	

Source: TST
29 May 2026
08:30

Solo FC	0-6	Detroit City FC
		Heuglin 3'; Chapman 16'; Nicholson 21'; Bosley 23'; Jordy 30'; Gaynor 38'

WakeMed Soccer Park Field 3, Cary, North Carolina, United States

29 May 2026
10:15

Sneaky FC	2-1	Wrexham Red Dragons
Cox 18'; Diaz 43'		Fletcher 31'

WakeMed Soccer Park Field 2, Cary, North Carolina, United States

29 May 2026
17:15

Sneaky FC	0-2	Detroit City FC
		López 35'; Hoppenot 43'

WakeMed Soccer Park Field 1, Cary, North Carolina, United States

29 May 2026
17:45

Solo FC	3-0	Wrexham Red Dragons
Eskay 12'; Ramsey 33'; Lackey 45'

WakeMed Soccer Park Field 4, Cary, North Carolina, United States

30 May 2026
13:30

Wrexham Red Dragons	1-2	Detroit City FC
Martinez 44'		White 24'; Augee 48'

WakeMed Soccer Park Field 5, Cary, North Carolina, United States

30 May 2026
15:00

Solo FC	2- 1	Sneaky FC
Ramsey 31'; Hatteberg 44'		John 37'

WakeMed Soccer Park Field 1, Cary, North Carolina, United States

==== Mixed Group B ====
Pos	Team	Pld	W	L	GF	GA	GD	Qualification
1	Boca Dallas	3	3	0	7	3	+4	Knockout stage
2	Prestige Worldwide	3	2	1	8	5	+3	Knockout stage
3	Pumas De Alabama	3	1	2	3	5	−2	
4	Legio FC	3	0	3	3	8	−5	

Source: TST
29 May 2026
08:30

Legio FC	1-4	Prestige Worldwide
Ramirez 54'		Lee 6'; Castaneda 15', 55'; Reyes 36'

WakeMed Soccer Park Field 4, Cary, North Carolina, United States

29 May 2026
10:00

Boca Dallas	2-0	Pumas De Alabama
Akyirem 20', 51'

WakeMed Soccer Park Field 4, Cary, North Carolina, United States

29 May 2026
16:30

Boca Dallas	2-1	Prestige Worldwide
Pinal 18'; Miranda 46'		Evans-Tostado 9'

WakeMed Soccer Park Field 5, Cary, North Carolina, United States

29 May 2026
19:00

Legio FC	0-1	Pumas De Alabama
		González 46'

WakeMed Soccer Park Field 3, Cary, North Carolina, United States

30 May 2026
11:00

Boca Dallas	3-2	Legio FC
Jones 8', 38'; Akyirem 46'		Clanton 16'; Robinson 34'

WakeMed Soccer Park Field 1, Cary, North Carolina, United States

30 May 2026
11:30

Pumas De Alabama	2-3	Prestige Worldwide
Martínez 13'; Durán 18'		Canes 15'; Garcia 41'; Lopez 47'

WakeMed Soccer Park Field 4, Cary, North Carolina, United States

==== Mixed Group C ====
Pos	Team	Pld	W	L	GF	GA	GD	Qualification
1	Peluche Hawks	3	2	1	10	7	+3	Knockout stage
2	Bumpy Pitch FC	3	2	1	8	5	+3	Knockout stage
3	Drunken Monkeys	3	2	1	6	5	+1	Knockout stage
4	Hashtag United	3	0	3	2	9	−7	

Source: TST
29 May 2026
09:00

Drunken Monkeys	2-3	Peluche Hawks
Sanchez 13'; Mellado 38'		Alexandre 14'; L. Silva 33'; Roberto 48'

WakeMed Soccer Park Field 7, Cary, North Carolina, United States

29 May 2026
10:30

Hashtag United	0-3	Bumpy Pitch FC
		Mariscal 16'; Tu'ua 24'; David 40'

WakeMed Soccer Park Field 5, Cary, North Carolina, United States

29 May 2026
16:15

Drunken Monkeys	1-0	Hashtag United
Sanchez 48'

WakeMed Soccer Park Field 2, Cary, North Carolina, United States

29 May 2026
18:00

Bumpy Pitch FC	3-2	Peluche Hawks
Schlueter 8'; Bah 34'; Watts 39'		Paola 20'; Marques 38'

WakeMed Soccer Park Field 5, Cary, North Carolina, United States

30 May 2026
12:00

Drunken Monkeys	3-2	Bumpy Pitch FC
Lazaro 36'; Mellado 28'; Penailillo 54'		Lucas 13'; Schlueter 38'

WakeMed Soccer Park Field 5, Cary, North Carolina, United States

30 May 2026
12:45

Hashtag United	2-5	Peluche Hawks
Fibey 10'; Restrepo 29'		Paola 3', 40'; Marques 15', 18'; Salvador 16'

WakeMed Soccer Park Field 3, Cary, North Carolina, United States

==== Ranking of Third Place Teams ====
Due to a complete tie between Sneaky FC and Pumas De Alabama, a penalty shoot out was given between the two teams to see who advances to the quarterfinals. Sneaky FC advanced winning the pentally shootout 3-2.

Pos	Grp	Team	Pld	W	L	GF	GA	GD	Qualification
1	C	Drunken Monkeys	3	2	1	6	5	+1	Knockout stage
2	A	Sneaky FC	3	1	2	3	5	−2	Knockout stage
3	B	Pumas De Alabama	3	1	2	3	5	−2	

Source: TST

=== Mixed Knockout Stage ===
Quarterfinals
A1	Detroit City FC	0
A3	Sneaky FC	1
B1	Boca Dallas	0
C2	Bumpy Pitch FC	2
A2	Solo FC	2
B2	Prestige Worldwide	1
C3	Drunken Monkeys	1
C1	Peluche Hawks	3

Semifinals
Sneaky FC	3
Bumpy Pitch FC	2
Solo FC	0
Peluche Hawks	2

Finals
Sneaky FC
Peluche Hawks

=== Mixed Quarterfinals ===
30 May 2026
21:45

Peluche Hawks	3-1	Drunken Monkeys
Lorena 3'; Luan da 37'; Pinheiro 49'		Alves 48'

WakeMed Soccer Park Field 5, Cary, North Carolina, United States

30 May 2026
22:00

Solo FC	2-1	Prestige Worldwide
Ruggles 33'; Ramsey 50'		Haro 29'

WakeMed Soccer Park Field 4, Cary, North Carolina, United States

30 May 2026
21:15

Detroit City FC	0-1	Sneaky FC
		Caceres 57'

WakeMed Soccer Park Field 4, Cary, North Carolina, United States

30 May 2026
22:30

Boca Dallas	0-1	Bumpy Pitch FC
		Tu'ua 39'

WakeMed Soccer Park Field 2, Cary, North Carolina, United States

=== Mixed Semifinals ===
31 May 2026
17:00

Peluche Hawks	2-0 Target Score: 2	Solo FC
Roberto 31'; Luan da 53'

WakeMed Soccer Park Field 1, Cary, North Carolina, United States
31 May 2026
18:00

Bumpy Pitch FC	2-3 Target Score: 3	Sneaky FC
Castles 14'; Bah 33'		Helfrich 19'; Brisco 41'; Halperon 46'

WakeMed Soccer Park Field 1, Cary, North Carolina, United States

=== Mixed Finals ===
1 June 2026
18:00

Sneaky FC	v	Peluche Hawks

WakeMed Soccer Park Field 1, Cary, North Carolina, United States
