= Poarch =

Poarch may refer to:

- Bella Poarch (born 1997), American social media personality and singer
- Chad Poarch (born 1997), American soccer player
- Poarch Band of Creek Indians, a federally recognized tribe of Native Americans
- Poarch Creek Indian Reservation, a Creek Indian reservation in Alabama
