= The Soccer Tournament 2023 =

Tournament details
- Country: United States
- Venue(s): WakeMed Soccer Park
- Dates: 1 June—4 June
- Teams: 32
- All statistics correct as of 22 May 2024.

The Soccer Tournament 2023, also referred to as TST 2023, was the inaugural edition of The Soccer Tournament. The tournament was held from 1 June to 4 June 2023 in Cary, North Carolina.

The tournament featured men's, women's, and some mixed-gender teams in the same tournament; it was won by Newtown Pride, the only fully amateur team in the tournament.

== Group stage ==
The draw was revealed on 4 May 2023.

=== Group A ===
Pos	Team	Pld	W	L	GF	GA	GD	Qualification
1	Newtown Pride FC	3	2	1	12	3	+9	Knockout stage
2	Kingdom FC	3	2	1	13	7	+6	Knockout stage
3	Hoosier Army (IU Alumni)	3	2	1	11	9	+2	
4	Borussia Dortmund	3	0	3	3	20	−17	

Updated to match(es) played on 2023-06-07. Source:

=== Group B ===
Pos	Team	Pld	W	L	GF	GA	GD	Qualification
1	Blade & Grass FC	3	3	0	9	6	+3	Knockout stage
2	DMV Diplomats	3	1	2	10	10	0	Knockout stage
3	Wolves F.C.	3	1	2	11	12	−1	
4	Villita FC	3	1	2	9	11	−2	

Updated to match(es) played on 2023-06-07. Source:

=== Group C ===
Pos	Team	Pld	W	L	GF	GA	GD	Qualification
1	Hapoel Tel Aviv F.C.	3	3	0	13	5	+8	Knockout stage
2	SLC FC	3	2	1	8	7	+1	Knockout stage
3	Club Necaxa	3	1	2	9	10	−1	
4	Virginia Dream	3	0	3	4	12	−8	

Updated to match(es) played on 2023-06-07. Source:

=== Group D ===
Pos	Team	Pld	W	L	GF	GA	GD	Qualification
1	Culture by Mo Ali FC	3	2	1	8	5	+3	Knockout stage
2	Far East United	3	2	1	7	4	+3	Knockout stage
3	West Ham United F.C.	2	1 (Note: The match between West Ham United F.C. and Dallas United was interrupted and never finished. (See #Controversy below.))	1	6	7	−1	
4	Dallas United	2	0	2	1	6	−5	

Updated to match(es) played on 2023-06-07. Source:

=== Group E ===
Pos	Team	Pld	W	L	GF	GA	GD	Qualification
1	Wrexham Red Dragons	3	3	0	23	3	+20	Knockout stage
2	Como 1907	3	2	1	15	7	+8	Knockout stage
3	Say Word FC	3	1	2	9	14	−5	
4	US Women	3	0	3	1	24	−23	

Updated to match(es) played on 2023-06-07. Source:

=== Group F ===
Pos	Team	Pld	W	L	GF	GA	GD	Qualification
1	Hashtag United	3	3	0	13	8	+5	Knockout stage
2	Conrad & Beasley United	3	2	1	12	12	0	Knockout stage
3	Nati SC	3	1	2	9	10	−1	
4	Gracie FC	3	0	3	6	10	−4	

Updated to match(es) played on 2023-06-07. Source:

=== Group G ===
Pos	Team	Pld	W	L	GF	GA	GD	Qualification
1	Sneaky Fox FC	3	3	0	9	3	+6	Knockout stage
2	ZALA FFF	3	1	2	12	8	+4	Knockout stage
3	Jackson TN Boom	3	1	2	9	11	−2	
4	Team Dempsey	3	1	2	6	14	−8	

Updated to match(es) played on 2023-06-07. Source:

=== Group H ===
Pos	Team	Pld	W	L	GF	GA	GD	Qualification
1	Raleigh Rebels FC	3	3	0	18	7	+11	Knockout stage
2	Duke Sevens (Duke Alumni)	3	2	1	8	8	0	Knockout stage
3	North Carolina FC	3	1	2	12	12	0	
4	Charlotte FC	3	0	3	7	18	−11	

Updated to match(es) played on 2023-06-07. Source:

== Knockout stage ==
First round
Newtown Pride FC	4
DMV Diplomats	0
Hapoel Tel Aviv F.C.	2
Far East United	1
Wrexham Red Dragons	3
Conrad & Beasley United	4
Sneaky Fox FC	2
Duke Sevens	1
Blade & Grass FC	4
Kingdom FC	3
Culture by Mo Ali FC	3
SLC FC	4
Hashtag United	1
Como 1907	2
Raleigh Rebels FC	3
Zala FFF	4

Quarter-finals
Newtown Pride FC	3
Hapoel Tel Aviv F.C.	1
Conrad & Beasley United	1
Sneaky Fox FC	2
Blade & Grass FC	2
SLC FC	3
Como 1907	3
Zala FFF	4

Semi-finals
Newtown Pride FC	4
Sneaky Fox FC	1
SLC FC	1
Zala FFF	0

Final
Newtown Pride FC	2
SLC FC	0

== Controversy ==
During the match between West Ham United F.C. and Dallas United, players of West Ham walked off the pitch after an alleged racial slur said by a Dallas player. After an investigation, TST and Dallas mutually agreed in Dallas United's withdrawal from the tournament.
