= The Soccer Tournament 2025 =

Football tournament in Cary, North Carolina

The Soccer Tournament 2025, also referred to as TST 2025, was the third annual edition of The Soccer Tournament. The tournament occurred from June 4-9 2025 in Cary, North Carolina. There are two tournaments, one each for men and women, with both having a $1 million prize for the winners. There are 64 teams over 134 matches for the six days of competition.

== Men's tournament ==
The Soccer Tournament 2025 – Men's tournament
Tournament details
- Country: United States
- Venue: WakeMed Soccer Park
- Dates: 4 June—9 June
- Teams: 48

The men's tournament consisted of 48 teams, in twelve groups of four.

=== Group stage ===
All times are local (UTC−05:00).

==== Group A ====
Pos	Team	Pld	W	L	GF	GA	GD	Qualification
1	La Bombonera	3	2	1	11	5	+6	Knockout stage
2	Liga Fut7	3	3	0	11	7	+4	Knockout stage
3	Mississauga Dolphins	3	1	2	11	12	−1	
4	Ambarrotera Hidalgo CF	3	0	3	4	13	−9	

Source: TST

==== Group B ====
Pos	Team	Pld	W	L	GF	GA	GD	Qualification
1	City Soccer FC	3	2	1	5	6	−1	Knockout stage
2	Cardinal Legacy (Stanford Alumni)	3	2	1	6	5	+1	Knockout stage
3	Cagliari Calcio	3	1	2	7	7	0	Knockout stage
4	Hoosier Army (IU Alumni)	3	1	2	5	5	0	

Source: TST

==== Group C ====
Pos	Team	Pld	W	L	GF	GA	GD	Qualification
1	Nani FC	3	2	1	8	7	+1	Knockout stage
2	Drip FC	3	2	1	9	9	0	Knockout stage
3	The 610	3	1	2	5	6	−1	Knockout stage
4	Club América	3	1	2	9	9	0	

Source: TST

==== Group D ====
Pos	Team	Pld	W	L	GF	GA	GD	Qualification
1	Newtown Pride FC	3	3	0	10	4	+6	Knockout stage
2	Boca Dallas	3	2	1	10	4	+6	Knockout stage
3	Dueling for Lincoln FC	3	1	2	8	10	−2	
4	LCF Academy	3	0	3	3	13	−10	

Source: TST

==== Group E ====
Pos	Team	Pld	W	L	GF	GA	GD	Qualification
1	Pumas de Alabama	3	3	0	13	5	+8	Knockout stage
2	Reggae Rovers	3	2	1	14	5	+9	Knockout stage
3	Dark Horse NC United	3	1	2	5	11	−6	
4	Say Word FC	3	0	3	4	15	−11	

Source: TST

==== Group F ====
Pos	Team	Pld	W	L	GF	GA	GD	Qualification
1	The CONCAFA Soccer Club	3	3	0	11	2	+9	Knockout stage
2	Wrexham Red Dragons	3	2	1	10	6	+4	Knockout stage
3	AFC Bournemouth	3	1	2	13	11	+2	Knockout stage
4	Real Athletico	3	0	3	3	18	−15	

Source: TST

==== Group G ====
Pos	Team	Pld	W	L	GF	GA	GD	Qualification
1	Villarreal CF	3	2	1	5	4	+1	Knockout stage
2	Tenfifteen FC	3	2	1	9	7	+2	Knockout stage
3	West Ham United FC	3	1	2	4	4	0	Knockout stage
4	Brown Ballers FC	3	1	2	5	8	−3	

Source: TST

==== Group H ====
Pos	Team	Pld	W	L	GF	GA	GD	Qualification
1	Soccer Central Saturdays Football	3	2	1	9	6	+3	Knockout stage
2	Sneaky Fox 97	3	2	1	10	8	+2	Knockout stage
3	Bumpy Pitch FC	3	2	1	11	10	+1	Knockout stage
4	La Mexicana Express	3	0	3	6	12	−6	

Source: TST

==== Group I ====
Pos	Team	Pld	W	L	GF	GA	GD	Qualification
1	Pasha Luxury FC	3	3	0	13	7	+6	Knockout stage
2	Hashtag United	3	2	1	9	5	+4	Knockout stage
3	Tactical Manager SC	3	1	2	7	9	−2	
4	Tobacco Road FC	3	0	3	4	12	−8	

Source: TST

==== Group J ====
Pos	Team	Pld	W	L	GF	GA	GD	Qualification
1	Plymouth Argyle FC	3	2	1	8	8	0	Knockout stage
2	Drunken Monkeys	3	2	1	9	8	+1	Knockout stage
3	Freedom United SC	3	1	2	5	7	−2	
4	Borussia Dortmund	3	1	2	9	8	+1	

Source: TST

==== Group K ====
Pos	Team	Pld	W	L	GF	GA	GD	Qualification
1	FC Roha Eagles	3	2	1	9	4	+5	Knockout stage
2	Kwik Goal FC	3	2	1	9	9	0	Knockout stage
3	Socceroof	3	2	1	8	8	0	Knockout stage
4	Raleigh Rebels	3	0	3	3	8	−5	

Source: TST

==== Group L ====
Pos	Team	Pld	W	L	GF	GA	GD	Qualification
1	Seleccion Potrero	3	2	1	7	3	+4	Knockout stage
2	Certified Lions FC	3	2	1	9	8	+1	Knockout stage
3	Trident FC	3	2	1	7	6	+1	Knockout stage
4	Atlético de Madrid	3	0	3	7	13	−6	

Source: TST

==== Ranking of Third Place Teams ====
Pos	Grp	Team	Pld	W	L	GF	GA	GD	Qualification
1	L	Trident FC	3	2	1	7	6	+1	Knockout stage
2	H	Bumpy Pitch FC	3	2	1	10	10	0	Knockout stage
3	K	Socceroof	3	2	1	8	8	0	Knockout stage
4	F	AFC Bournemouth	3	1	2	13	11	+2	Knockout stage
5	B	Cagliari Calcio	3	1	2	7	7	0	Knockout stage
6	G	West Ham United FC	3	1	2	4	4	0	Knockout stage
7	A	Mississauga Dolphins	3	1	2	11	12	−1	Knockout stage
8	C	The 610	3	1	2	5	6	−1	Knockout stage
9	D	Dueling for Lincoln FC	3	1	2	8	10	−2	
10	I	Tactical Manager SC	3	1	2	7	9	−2	
11	J	Freedom United SC	3	1	2	5	7	−2	
12	E	Dark Horse NC United	3	1	2	5	11	−6	

Source: TST

=== Knockout stage ===
Round of 32
A1	La Bombonera	3
3H (Group C)	The 610	0
D2	Boca Dallas	3
E2	Reggae Rovers	2
I1	Pasha Luxury FC	5
L2	Certified Lions FC	0
H1	Saturdays Football	1
3A (Group L)	Trident FC	2
B1	City Soccer FC	4
3G (Group A)	Mississauga Dolphins	3
C2	Drip FC	6
F2	Wrexham	2
G1	Villarreal CF	1
3B (Group H)	Bumpy Pitch FC	2
K2	Kwik Goal FC	4
J1	Plymouth Argyle FC	1
E1	Pumas de Alabama	4
3D (Group F)	Bournemouth	2
L1	Seleccion Potrero	4
I2	Hashtag United	2
A2	Liga Fut7	6
H2	Sneaky Fox 97	3
D1	Newtown Pride FC	5
3E (Group B)	Cagliari Calcio	2
C1	Nani FC	3
3F (Group G)	West Ham United FC	2
B2	Cardinal Legacy	3
G2	Tenfifteen FC	2
K1	FC Roha Eagles	1
J2	Drunken Monkeys	2
F1	The CONCAFA; Soccer Club	3
3C (Group K)	Socceroof	1

Round of 16
La Bombonera	1
Boca Dallas	0
Pasha Luxury FC	4
Trident FC	0
City Soccer FC	2
Drip FC	3
Bumpy Pitch FC	1
Kwik Goal FC	0
Pumas de Alabama	7
Selection Potrero	0
Liga Fut7	1
Newtown Pride FC	2
Nani FC	3
Cardinal Legacy	2
Drunken Monkeys	0
The CONCAFA; Soccer Club	2

Quarterfinals
La Bombonera	3
Pasha Luxury FC	4
Drip FC	1
Bumpy Pitch FC	2
Pumas de Alabama	3
Newtown Pride FC	1
Nani FC	1
The CONCAFA; Soccer Club	2

Semifinals
Pasha Luxury FC	1
Bumpy Pitch FC	4
Pumas de Alabama	5
The CONCAFA; Soccer Club	1

Finals
Bumpy Pitch FC	2
Pumas de Alabama	1

=== Final ===
9 June 2025
20:30 EDT

Bumpy Pitch FC	2–1 Target Score: 2	Pumas de Alabama
Charlie Gonzalez 52' 64'	Report	Miguel Aldair Giorgana Hernandez 30'

WakeMed Soccer Park, Cary, North Carolina, United States

== Women's tournament ==
The Soccer Tournament 2025 – Women's tournament
Tournament details
- Country: United States
- Venue: WakeMed Soccer Park
- Dates: 4 June—9 June
- Teams: 16

The women's tournament consists of 16 teams, in four groups of four.

=== Group stage ===
All times are local (UTC−05:00).

==== Group A ====
Pos	Team	Pld	W	L	GF	GA	GD	Qualification
1	US Women	3	3	0	9	3	+6	Knockout stage
2	Austin Rise FC	3	2	1	7	3	+4	Knockout stage
3	Process FC	3	1	2	5	6	−1	
4	Angel City 7s	3	0	3	2	11	−9	

Source: TST

==== Group B ====
Pos	Team	Pld	W	L	GF	GA	GD	Qualification
1	Drunken Monkeys	3	3	0	10	2	+8	Knockout stage
2	Ultrain FC	3	2	1	9	8	+1	Knockout stage
3	Kansas City II	3	1	2	9	9	0	
4	Wrexham Red Dragons	3	0	3	7	16	−9	

Source: TST

==== Group C ====
Pos	Team	Pld	W	L	GF	GA	GD	Qualification
1	Solo FC	3	2	1	6	2	+4	Knockout stage
2	Streetball FC Canada	3	2	1	8	7	+1	Knockout stage
3	Speedy Turtles	3	1	2	5	8	−3	
4	Albion SC	3	1	2	3	5	−2	

Source: TST

==== Group D ====
Pos	Team	Pld	W	L	GF	GA	GD	Qualification
1	Bumpy Pitch FC	3	3	0	15	9	+6	Knockout stage
2	Reunion City Dallas	3	2	1	10	4	+6	Knockout stage
3	North Carolina Courage	3	1	2	7	10	−3	
4	Boca Dallas	3	0	3	5	14	−9	

Source: TST

=== Women's knockout stage ===
Quarterfinals
WC2	Streetball FC Canada	2
WA1	US Women	5
J2	Drunken Monkeys	1
WD2	Reunion City Dallas	2
WB2	Ultrain FC	1
WC2	Solo FC	0
H3	Bumpy Pitch FC	3
WA2	Austin Rise FC	2

Semifinals
WA1	US Women	2
WD2	Reunion City Dallas	0
WB2	Ultrain FC	1
WD1	Bumpy Pitch FC	2

Finals
US Women	3
Bumpy Pitch FC	0

=== Final ===
9 June 2025
19:00 EDT

US Women	3–0 Target Score: 3	Bumpy Pitch FC
Tessa Dellarose 11'; Casey Loyd 31'; Evelyn Shores 54'	Report

WakeMed Soccer Park, Cary, North Carolina, United States
