= 2020 Hank Steinbrecher Cup =

Tournament details
- Country: United States of America
- Teams: 4

Final positions
- Champions: Canceled

The 2020 Hank Steinbrecher Cup was planned to be the eighth edition of the United States Adult Soccer Association's (USASA) tournament whose winner is recognized with the title of U.S. National Amateur Champions. This edition was canceled in April due to the COVID-19 pandemic in the United States.

USL League Two (USL L2) side Flint City Bucks were the defending champion, having won the last three competitions.

== Host selection ==
Flint City Bucks were selected to host the tournament following their crowning as the 2019 National Amateur Champion.

== Teams ==
The tournament would have featured the 2019 USASA National Amateur Cup winner Newtown Pride FC and the defending Steinbrecher Cup winner Flint City Bucks. Ordinarily the tournament would have also featured the 2019 USL League Two Champion and the 2019 National Premier Soccer League (NPSL) champion. However the 2019 USL League 2 champion was the previously qualified Flint City Bucks, so in their place USL League Two Runner-up Reading United AC was invited. The 2019 NPSL Champion The Miami FC was ruled ineligible due to being a professional club. In their place the USASA invited the NPSL's top amateur club Cleveland SC.

== See also ==
- 2019 NPSL season
- 2019 USL League Two season
