= Chad Poarch =

American soccer player

Personal information
- Date of birth: December 30, 1997 (age 28)
- Place of birth: Middletown, Delaware, United States
- Height: 5 ft 11 in (1.80 m)
- Positions: Midfielder; defender

Team information
- Current team: Baltimore Blast
- Number: 4

Youth career
- 2015–2016: FC Delco

College career
| Years | Team | Apps | (Gls) |
| 2016 | High Point Panthers | 19 | (1) |
| 2017 | Delaware Fightin' Blue Hens | 16 | (3) |

Senior career*
| Years | Team | Apps | (Gls) |
| 2018–2019 | West Chester United | | |
| 2019 | Reading United AC | 2 | (0) |
| 2019 | Charlotte Independence | 2 | (0) |
| 2024– | Baltimore Blast (indoor) | 0 | (0) |
- * Club domestic league appearances and goals as of November 27, 2024

Chad Poarch (born December 30, 1997) is an American soccer player who plays as a defender for the Baltimore Blast in the Major Arena Soccer League.

== Career ==
Poarch played college soccer at High Point University in 2016, before transferring to the University of Delaware in 2017. Poarch left college early to pursue a professional career.

In 2018 and 2019, Poarch appeared for National Premier Soccer League side West Chester United SC, with all his appearances for the club occurring in their Lamar Hunt US Open Cup fixtures. Poarch also appeared for USL League Two side Reading United AC in 2019, making six appearances for the club.

On September 27, 2019, Poarch joined USL Championship side Charlotte Independence. He made his debut shortly after, starting in a 4–0 win over Hartford Athletic on September 28, 2019.

Poarch played in The Soccer Tournament 2024 for Delaware-based La Bombonera, scoring the winning goal in the final.

Poarch joined the Baltimore Blast of the Major Arena Soccer League in August 2024.

== Personal life ==
Chad's sister, Alyssa, played college soccer for the Maryland Terrapins.Brothers Stephen played basketball at Washington College (Maryland) and Jordan Played soccer at University of Virginia and UNCG. His Parents are Brad and Cynthia Poarch
