= WakeMed Soccer Park =

Soccer stadium in Cary, North Carolina

Coordinates: 35°47′10″N 78°45′18″W

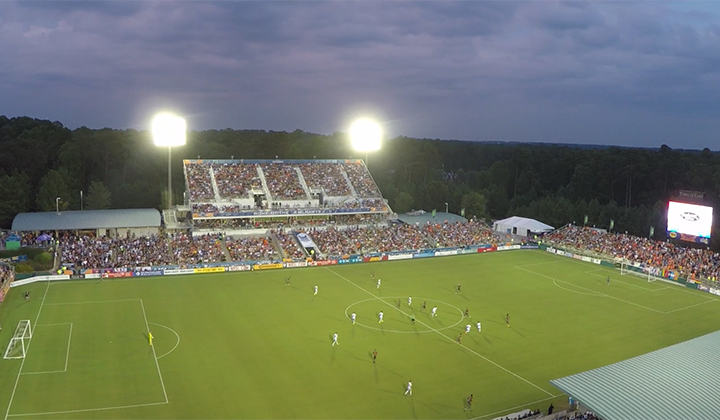
- The stadium during a friendly in 2016

- Location in North Carolina Location in the United States
- Former names: State Capital Soccer Park (2001–2002); SAS Soccer Park (2002–2007); Sahlen's Stadium (2017–2021); First Horizon Stadium (2024–present)
- Location: Cary, North Carolina, U.S.
- Owner: Wake County
- Operator: Town of Cary
- Capacity: 10,000
- Surface: Natural grass

Construction
- Groundbreaking: 2001
- Opened: May 2002; 24 years ago
- Cost: $14.5 million (plus $6.3 million expansion)
- Architects: Envirotek, Inc.

Tenant
- List: Carolina Courage (WUSA) (2001–2003); North Carolina FC (USLC) (2007–2025); Carolina Flyers (AUDL) (2015–2021); North Carolina Courage (NWSL) (2017–present); North Carolina FC U23 (USL2) (2002–2009, 2011–present); NC State Wolfpack (NCAA); men's and women's soccer (2002–2007)

Website
- carync.gov/wakemed-soccer-park

WakeMed Soccer Park is a soccer complex in Cary, North Carolina, United States. It consists of a purpose-built, soccer-specific main stadium named First Horizon Stadium, two lighted practice football pitches, and four additional fields. The main stadium and the two lighted fields (2 & 3) are all FIFA international regulation size (120 by 75 yards (110 m × 69 m)). The stadium seats 10,000, while Field 2 also has 1,000 permanent bleacher seats. The complex also sports a full-length cross-country course and houses the offices of Triangle Professional Soccer.

Originally opened in 2002 as the home of the Carolina Courage of the WUSA, WakeMed Soccer Park is now the home to the North Carolina Courage of the National Women's Soccer League. The North Carolina State Wolfpack men's and women's teams of the ACC play select matches there and the complex hosts tournaments such as the NCAA College Cup, the ACC Soccer Championships, and the NCHSAA high school state soccer finals. It was the home of North Carolina FC of the USL Championship before their folding at the end of 2025.

== Construction history ==
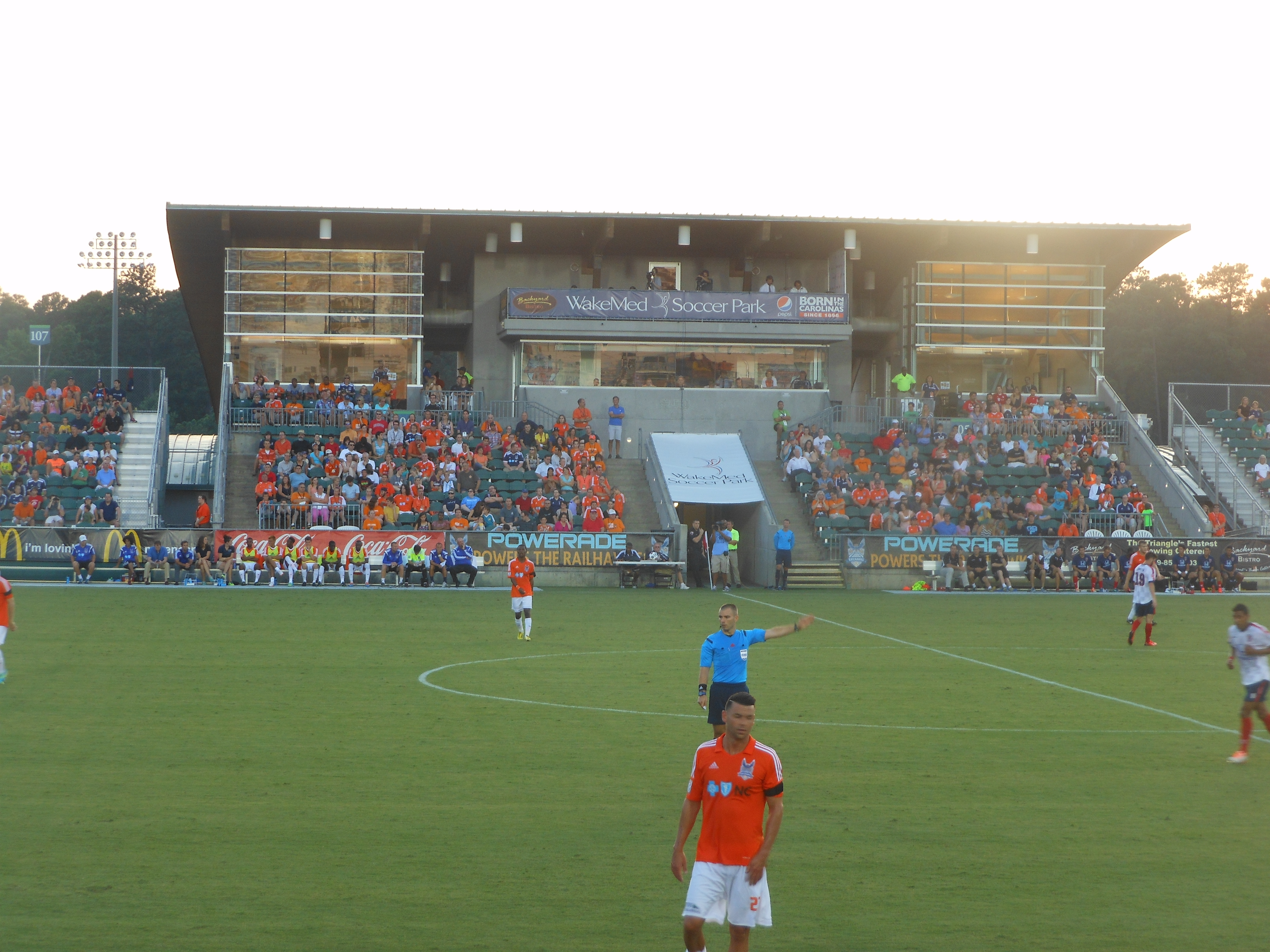
West stand of the renovated stadium as seen in 2014

WakeMed Soccer Park opened in May 2002 as State Capital Soccer Park. The park is on 150 acres (0.61 km^{2}) that the state of North Carolina has leased to Wake County. Money to build the soccer park came from $14.5 million in county-wide hotel room and prepared food and beverage taxes. The Town of Cary assumed responsibility for operations and maintenance in 2004 from Capital Area Soccer League. On January 26, 2006, the Town of Cary council amended its lease to allow it to sublet the property to Triangle Professional Soccer through the year 2011 for the exclusive promotion of professional soccer and lacrosse events at the complex.

=== Expansion ===
In November 2011, the Town of Cary kicked off a $6.3 million expansion project. The finished expansion added 3,000 permanent seats to the 7,000-seat stadium, 1,500 of the seats going to the north end zone and the other 1,500 to upper-level stands on the east side of the stadium. Also added on the east side were a new three-story building to provide restrooms, concessions, and access to the additional seating from the third floor. Team locker rooms were relocated to the ground level of the new structure to allow players direct access to the stadium from midfield and direct access from their team bus to the locker rooms.

== Naming rights ==
SAS Institute, a Cary-based software company, had naming rights to the complex through June 30, 2007, with the option to extend their naming rights for an additional three years. On September 27, 2007, the Town of Cary announced that SAS had not exercised their option on the naming rights and that WakeMed Health & Hospitals had purchased the naming rights to the complex for $300,000 per year.

Effective January 1, 2008, the complex became known as "WakeMed Soccer Park". On March 31, 2017, it was announced that Sahlen Packing Company had acquired naming rights to the main stadium at WakeMed Soccer Park, thus becoming "Sahlen's Stadium at WakeMed Soccer Park". Sahlen's paid $400,000 over 5 years for the rights, with $100,000 going to the town of Cary and the rest to the North Carolina Courage. On April 30, 2021, WakeMed renewed its agreement through 2023. On December 18, 2024, the main stadium naming rights were purchased by First Horizon Bank, renaming the stadium as "First Horizon Stadium at WakeMed Soccer Park".

== Notable events ==
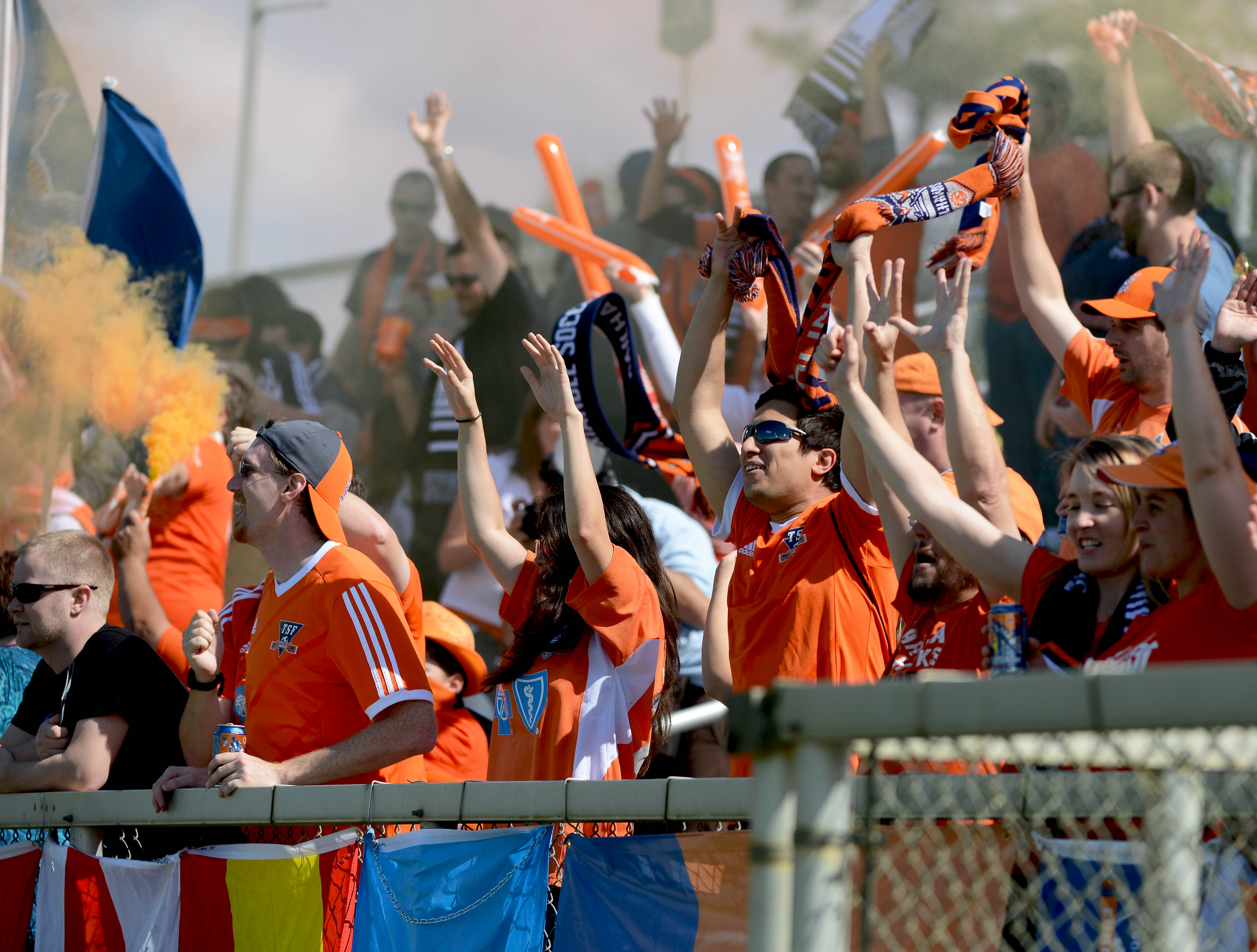
North Carolina FC cheering during a 2016 game

- 2002 US men's soccer team World Cup Training Camp
- 2002 Women's Nike Cup 1st Round
- 2003 WUSA All-Star Game
- 2003 NCAA Women's College Cup
- 2003 ACC Soccer Championships
- 2004 ACC Soccer Championships
- 2004 NCAA Women's College Cup
- 2005 ACC Soccer Championships
- 2005 NCAA Men's College Cup
- 2006 Rochester Rhinos Spring Combine and Training Camp
- 2006 US men's soccer team v. Jamaica
- 2006 US men's soccer team World Cup Training Camp
- 2006 USL First Division All-Star Game (v. Sheffield Wednesday)
- 2006 US women's soccer team v. Canada
- 2006 State Games of North Carolina (soccer events, ceremonies)
- 2006 ACC Women's Soccer Championships
- 2006 NCAA Women's College Cup
- 2007 El Salvador v. Honduras International Friendly
- 2007 ACC Men's Soccer Championships
- 2007 NCAA Men's College Cup
- 2008 NCAA Women's College Cup
- 2008 Major League Lacrosse Rochester Rattlers vs. Philadelphia Barrage
- 2009 NCAA Men's College Cup
- 2009 Panama vs. Honduras International Friendly
- 2010 ACC Women's Soccer Championships
- 2010 ACC Men's Soccer Championships
- 2010 NCAA Women's College Cup
- 2011 US women's soccer team v. Japan
- 2011 US women's soccer team Training Camp
- 2013 NCAA Women's College Cup
- 2014 US women's soccer team v. Switzerland
- 2014 NCAA Men's College Cup
- 2015 NACRA Sevens Regional Olympic Qualifier
- 2015 Raleigh Flyers (AUDL) Southern Division Playoffs
- 2016 Carolina RailHawks v. West Ham United
- 2017 North Carolina FC v. Atlas CF
- 2017 North Carolina FC v. Swansea City
- 2017 United States women's national soccer team v. South Korea
- 2018 United States men's national soccer team v. Paraguay
- 2018 CONCACAF Women's Championship Group A
- 2018 NCAA Women's College Cup
- 2019 North Carolina FC v. Club Necaxa
- 2019 Women's International Champions Cup
- 2019 NWSL Championship
- 2019 NCAA Men's College Cup (Georgetown University)
- 2020 NCAA Men's College Cup (Marshall v. Indiana)
- 2022 El Salvador v. Panama International Friendly
- The Soccer Tournament 2023
- 2023 NCAA Division I Women's Lacrosse Championship semifinals and final
- The Soccer Tournament 2024
- The Soccer Tournament 2025

== Cross-country events ==
The grounds also host multiple high school cross-country races. Including dual meets, high school conference championships, Mid-East Region Championship, and the Nike Cross Nationals Southeast Regional meets. The course starts and ends behind the practice fields and runs along the perimeter of the grounds. It is known to give personal bests even with a difficult hill which must be run twice. The course record for the 5K distance is 14:23.26 set by Keegan Smith at the 2024 NXR Southeast Regional meet. In recent years it has held the Atlantic Coast Conference's conference championship.

== Rugby union ==
Date	Home	Result	Away	Competition	Attendance	Ref.
July 18, 2026	United States	29–22	Spain	2026 Nations Cup	7,397	

Events and tenants
Preceded by Home Depot Center; Hermann Stadium; Pizza Hut Park; PPL Park; Harder Stadium; Railyards Stadium	Men's College Cup host 2005; 2007; 2009; 2014; 2019-2022; 2025	Succeeded by Hermann Stadium; Pizza Hut Park; Harder Stadium; Children's Mercy Park; Lynn Family Stadium; TBD
Preceded by Mike A. Myers Stadium; Aggie Soccer Stadium; Aggie Soccer Stadium; Aggie Soccer Stadium; Torero Stadium; FAU Stadium; Orlando City Stadium; Avaya Stadium; Stevens Stadium	Women's College Cup host 2003–2004; 2006; 2008; 2010; 2013; 2015; 2018; 2020; 2022-2024	Succeeded by Aggie Soccer Stadium; Aggie Soccer Stadium; Aggie Soccer Stadium; KSU Soccer Stadium; FAU Stadium; Avaya Stadium; Avaya Stadium; Stevens Stadium; Railyards Stadium
