= Newtown Pride FC =

American soccer team

Newtown Pride
- Full name: Newtown Pride Football Club
- Nickname: The Pride
- Founded: 1998; 28 years ago
- Ground: Newtown High School; Sandy Hook, Connecticut
- Founders: Michael and Matt Svanda
- General Manager: Matt Svanda
- Head Coach: Michael Svanda
- League: Connecticut Soccer League (USASA)
Home colors	Away colors

Newtown Pride Football Club is an amateur American soccer team based in the Sandy Hook, part of Newtown, Connecticut. The team plays in the Connecticut Soccer League, regulated by the United States Adult Soccer Association (USASA).

== History ==
The team was founded in 1998 by father and son Mike and Matt Svanda.

In 2019, the team won the National Amateur Cup for the first time in its history, becoming the second team from Connecticut, & first since 1967, to win the Cup. The team beat New Jersey sides Jackson Lions and Cedar Stars Academy to reach the USASA Region I Final against Steel FC (Pennsylvania), which the team won 2–0. In the National Final, the Pride beat RWB Adria (Illinois) in the semifinal before beating Horizon FC (Texas), 4–0, and won both the trophy and $15,000.

The team became the second National Amateur Champion to directly qualify for the U.S. Open Cup after U.S. Soccer had started the practice with the 2018 Champions Milwaukee Bavarian SC. Newtown were due to enter the 2020 U.S. Open Cup in the first round alongside local qualifiers and teams from both the National Premier Soccer League and USL League Two.

As National Amateur Cup Champions Newtown also secured a spot in the 2020 Hank Steinbrecher Cup. The team would compete against defending champion Flint City Bucks and the National Champions of both the NPSL and USL 2 (or the furthest advancing amateur team if the champion is a professional side) to determine the "USA National Amateur Champions".

In August 2019, then-U.S. Soccer Federation President Carlos Cordeiro announced that Newtown would also host the winners of the 2019 UEFA Regions' Cup, Dolny Śląsk, in the inaugural International Amateur Cup. The game was originally set to take place on May 19, 2020, but was later postponed to May 2021 due to the COVID-19 pandemic.

On June 4, 2023, Newtown won the inaugural The Soccer Tournament, a 7-a-side tournament held in Cary, North Carolina. They were the only fully amateur club in the tournament and competed against teams representing professional clubs or those that comprised current and former professional players. Newtown clinched the tournament championship and its $1 million prize by defeating Canada's SLC FC 2–0 in the final. A portion of the prize money was donated by the team to the Newtown Community Center.

== Charity ==
Following the Sandy Hook Elementary School shooting in 2012, the Pride began to dedicate their matches in honor of the victims and families of the tragedy. The team continues to work with Newtown Youth and Family Services and has played charity matches against larger teams such as the New York Cosmos (2013), New York Red Bulls II (2015), Reading United AC (2016), Kingston Stockade FC (2017), and Bethlehem Steel FC (2017).

== Honors ==
- Connecticut Soccer League: Champions (2015, 2016, 2017, 2018, 2019)
- USASA Region I Werner Fricker Open Cup: Finalist (2015)
- USASA Region I Amateur Cup: Champions (2019)
- National Amateur Cup: Champions (2019)
- U.S. Open Cup: Qualified (~~2020~~, 2021)
- The Soccer Tournament: Champions (2023)
- Hank Steinbrecher Cup: Qualified (~~2020~~)
