= Louisville Lightning season-by-season results =

The Louisville Lightning were an American professional indoor soccer team based at the Mockingbird Valley Soccer Club in Louisville, Kentucky. They joined the Professional Arena Soccer League in 2009 and suspended operations in 2012 after three full seasons.

== 2009–10 season ==
Louisville Lightning
2009–10 PASL-Pro season
- Arena: Mockingbird Valley Soccer Club; 3000 Mellwood Avenue; Louisville, Kentucky 40207

The 2009–10 Louisville Lightning season was the first season of the Louisville Lightning professional indoor soccer club. The Lightning, an Eastern Division team in the Professional Arena Soccer League, played their home games at the Mockingbird Valley Soccer Club in Louisville, Kentucky.

During their inaugural season, the Lightning went 11–5, finishing second in the Eastern Division to the Cincinnati Kings. The team also reached the finals of the 2009–10 United States Open Cup for Arena Soccer, losing to the San Diego Sockers.

Win Tie Loss

=== Regular season ===
| Game | Date | Level | Opponent | Results | | Location |
| Game | Date | Level | Opponent | Score | Record | Location |
|---|---|---|---|---|---|---|
| 1 | November 13 | PASL | at 1790 Cincinnati Express | L 5–6 | 0–1 | Mockingbird Valley Soccer Complex |
| 2 | November 20 | PASL | Detroit Waza | W 8–3 | 1–1 | Mockingbird Valley Soccer Complex |
| 3 | December 4 | PASL | at St. Louis Illusion | W 7–5 | 2–1 | Glen Carbon, IL |
| 4 | December 19 | PASL | at St. Louis Illusion | L 9–10 | 2–2 | Glen Carbon, IL |
| 5 | January 2 | PASL | at Ohio Vortex | W 11–9 | 3–2 | Canton, OH |
| 6 | January 8 | PASL+Cup | Ohio Vortex | W 18–4 | 4–2 | Mockingbird Valley Soccer Complex |
| 7 | January 9 | PASL | at 1790 Cincinnati Express | L 8–9 | 4–3 | Cincinnati, OH |
| 8 | January 16 | PASL | at Ohio Vortex | L 12–9 | 4–4 | Canton, OH |
| 9 | January 17 | PASL+Cup | at Detroit Waza | W 7–6 | 5–4 | Taylor Sportsplex |
| 10 | January 22 | PASL | St. Louis Illusion | W 8–1 | 6–4 | Mockingbird Valley Soccer Complex |
| 11 | January 29 | PASL | Detroit Waza | W 15–6 | 6–4 | Mockingbird Valley Soccer Complex |
| 12 | February 5 | PASL | Ohio Vortex | W 14–8 | 7–4 | Mockingbird Valley Soccer Complex |
| 13 | February 6 | PASL | at Detroit Waza | W 9–8 | 8–4 | Taylor Sportsplex |
| 14 | February 12 | PASL | at 1790 Cincinnati Express | L 6–7 | 9–5 | Cincinnati, OH |
| 15 | February 19 | PASL+Cup | 1790 Cincinnati Express | W 8–5 | 10–5 | Mockingbird Valley Soccer Complex |
| 16 | February 26 | PASL | Detroit Waza | W 15–12 | 11–5 | Mockingbird Valley Soccer Complex |

=== US Open Cup ===
| Game | Date | Level | Opponent | Results | | Location |
| Game | Date | Level | Opponent | Score | Record | Location |
|---|---|---|---|---|---|---|
| Round of 32 | December 11 | US Open Cup | West Virginia Quantum Force | W 22–1 | 1–0 | Mockingbird Valley Soccer Complex |
| Round of 16 | January 8 | PASL+Cup | Ohio Vortex | W 18–4 | 2–0 | Mockingbird Valley Soccer Complex |
| Quarter-finals | January 17 | PASL+Cup | at Detroit Waza | W 7–6 | 3–0 | Taylor Sportsplex |
| Semi-finals | February 19 | PASL+Cup | 1790 Cincinnati Express | W 8–5 | 10–5 | Mockingbird Valley Soccer Complex |
| Finals | April 10 | US Open Cup | San Diego Sockers | L 11–7 | 4–1 | Mockingbird Valley Soccer Complex |

== 2010–11 season ==
Louisville Lightning
2010–11 PASL-Pro season
- Head Coach: Ted J. Nichols
- Arena: Mockingbird Valley Soccer Club; 3000 Mellwood Avenue; Louisville, Kentucky 40207

The 2010–11 Louisville Lightning season was the second season of the Louisville Lightning professional indoor soccer club. The Lightning, an Eastern Division team in the Professional Arena Soccer League, played their home games at the Mockingbird Valley Soccer Club in Louisville, Kentucky.

The 2010–11 season began with high expectations in Louisville, as the team became the first PASL team to sign three former Major League Soccer players to the team at the same time. Joining John Michael Hayden, who was returning from the previous year, were Othaniel Yanez and Thabiso Khumalo. Unfortunately, the team went 8–8, which was good enough for second in the Eastern Division over the Detroit Waza by goal differential, but a step back from the previous year.

=== Regular season ===
| Date | Level | Opponent | Location | Result | Record |
|---|---|---|---|---|---|
| 11.12.2010 | PASL | Cincinnati Kings | Louisville | L 6–5 | 0–1 |
| 11.19.2010 | PASL | Detroit Waza | Louisville | L 6–4 | 0–2 |
| 12.03.2010 | PASL | Revolución Tijuana | Tijuana, Mexico | W 13–7 | 1–2 |
| 12.04.2010 | PASL | San Diego Sockers | Del Mar | L 11–5 | 1–3 |
| 12.17.2010 | PASL | San Diego Sockers | Louisville | L 10–7 | 1–4 |
| 1.01.2010 | PASL | Cincinnati Kings | Cincinnati | L 11–9 | 1–5 |
| 1.15.2010 | PASL | Detroit Waza | Taylor | W 10–4 | 2–5 |
| 1.22.2010 | PASL | Cincinnati Kings | Louisville | L 10–7 | 2–6 |
| 1.28.2010 | PASL | Ohio Vortex | Louisville | W 8–3 | 3–6 |
| 2.04.2010 | PASL | Detroit Waza | Louisville | W 8–7 | 4–6 |
| 2.05.2010 | PASL | Ohio Vortex | Canton | W 14–7 | 5–6 |
| 2.11.2010 | PASL | Ohio Vortex | Canton | W 11–4 | 6–6 |
| 2.12.2010 | PASL | Detroit Waza | Taylor | L 10–9 | 6–7 |
| 2.19.2010 | PASL | Illinois Piasa | Louisville | L 11–8 | 6–8 |
| 2.25.2010 | PASL | Ohio Vortex | Louisville | W 13–6 | 7–8 |
| 3.04.2010 | PASL* | Cincinnati Kings | Cincinnati | W 9–4 | 8–8 |

=== US Open Cup ===
| Date | Level | Opponent | Location | Result | Record |
|---|---|---|---|---|---|
| 12.10.2010 | US Open Cup | Evansville Crush | Louisville | W 25–3 | Round of 16 |
| 1.07.2010 | US Open Cup | A.A.F.C. | Louisville | W 23–5 | Quarterfinals |

- - The Lightning and Cincinnati Kings were slated to play each other in the semifinals of the US Open Cup, but due to miscommunication and scheduling conflicts, the PASL forced Louisville to forfeit instead of counting the March 4 game towards both the PASL regular season and the US Open Cup, as is normally done to combat costs from travel when applicable. Had this game counted for both levels, Louisville would have played the San Diego Sockers in the finals of the US Open Cup for the second consecutive year. Instead, San Diego defeated Cincinnati 13–6.

== 2011–12 schedule ==
Louisville Lightning
2011–12 PASL season
- Arena: Mockingbird Valley Soccer Club; 3000 Mellwood Avenue; Louisville, Kentucky 40207

The 2011–12 Louisville Lightning season was the third season of the Louisville Lightning professional indoor soccer club. The Lightning, an Eastern Division team in the Professional Arena Soccer League, played their home games in the Mockingbird Valley Soccer Club in Louisville, Kentucky.

On October 28, 2011, the Lightning played a pre-season split-squad exhibition match dubbed the "Kick Cancer Game". The team won 11 games and lost 5 during the 2011–12 regular season. They played all 16 of these games against Eastern Division rivals Cincinnati Kings, Detroit Waza, Illinois Piasa, Kansas Magic, and Ohio Vortex. The team qualified for the postseason but lost to the Kansas Magic in the first round of the playoffs.

The Louisville Lightning also participated in the 2011–12 United States Open Cup for Arena Soccer. The team defeated Indy Elite FC in the wild card round but lost to the Cincinnati Kings in the Round of 16, ending their run in the tournament.
