= 2011–12 Louisville Lightning season =

Louisville Lightning
2011–12 PASL season
- General Manager: Nick Stover
- Head Coach: Scott Budnick
- Arena: Mockingbird Valley Soccer Club; 3000 Mellwood Ave. Louisville, Kentucky 40207
- Professional Arena Soccer League: 2nd, Eastern Division
- Highest home attendance: 1,458 (February 24, 2012) vs Detroit Waza
- Lowest home attendance: 755 (November 18, 2011) vs Cincinnati Kings
- Average home league attendance: 1,021

The 2011–12 Louisville Lightning season was the third season of the Louisville Lightning professional indoor soccer club. The Lightning, an Eastern Division team in the Professional Arena Soccer League, played their home games in the Mockingbird Valley Soccer Club in Louisville, Kentucky. The team was led by general manager Nick Stover and head coach Scott Budnick with associate coach Ted Nichols.

On October 28, 2011, the Lightning played a pre-season split-squad exhibition match dubbed the "Kick Cancer Game". The team won 11 games and lost 5 during the 2011–12 regular season. They played all 16 of these games against Eastern Division rivals Cincinnati Kings, Detroit Waza, Illinois Piasa, Kansas Magic, and Ohio Vortex. The team qualified for the postseason but lost to the Kansas Magic in the first round of the playoffs.

The Louisville Lightning also participated in the 2011–12 United States Open Cup for Arena Soccer. The team defeated Indy Elite FC in the wild card round but lost to the Cincinnati Kings in the Round of 16, ending their run in the tournament.

After this season, the team announced it would skip the 2012–13 PASL season and go dormant. In a March 2013 interview, team owner Ted Nichols said that low attendance at games placed "somewhat of a financial drain" on the organization and that the team remains "in a bit of a hiatus".

== Off-field moves ==
In October 2011, the Lightning announced a partnership with the PUMA sportswear company. The team wore PUMA soccer jerseys, warm-up gear, and training gear for the 2011–12 season. In the team's first two years of existence, they had worn Adidas gear and jerseys.

Pre-game activities at the team's home opener included an awareness event for St. Jude Children's Research Hospital, distribution of can koozies (holders) to fans, and a "first kick" ceremony with country singer Darren Warren.

== Schedule ==
Win Tie Loss

=== Regular season ===
Game	Day	Date	Kickoff	Opponent	Results		Location	Attendance
Game	Day	Date	Kickoff	Opponent	Final Score	Record	Location	Attendance
1	Sunday	November 6	2:35pm	at Detroit Waza	L 3–9	0–1	Taylor Sportsplex	450
2	Saturday	November 12	7:35pm	at Cincinnati Kings	W 11–9	1–1	Cincinnati Gardens	1,103
3	Friday	November 18	7:30pm	Cincinnati Kings	W 13–4	2–1	Mockingbird Valley Soccer Club	755
4	Friday	December 2	8:35pm	at Illinois Piasa	L 9–13	2–2	The Sports Academy	307
5	Saturday	December 3	8:35pm	at Kansas Magic	W 8–6	3–2	EPIC Indoor Sports	548
6	Friday	December 16	7:30pm	Cincinnati Kings	W 8–7	4–2	Mockingbird Valley Soccer Club	1,087
7	Friday	December 30	8:05pm	at Cincinnati Kings†	L 3–9	4–3	Cincinnati Gardens	1,413
8	Saturday	January 7	7:30pm	Illinois Piasa	W 15–5	5–3	Mockingbird Valley Soccer Club	1,106
9	Friday	January 13	7:30pm	Ohio Vortex	W 15–4	6–3	Mockingbird Valley Soccer Club	976
10	Sunday	January 15	2:35pm	at Detroit Waza	L 7–10	6–4	Taylor Sportsplex	413
11	Friday	January 20	7:30pm	Illinois Piasa	W 7–4	7–4	Mockingbird Valley Soccer Club	792
12	Saturday	January 21	7:00pm	at Ohio Vortex	W 9–7	8–4	Canton Memorial Civic Center	347
13	Sunday	January 29	5:35pm	at Kansas Magic	W 7–6	9–4	EPIC Indoor Sports	252
14	Friday	February 3	7:30pm	Kansas Magic	W 10–6	10–4	Mockingbird Valley Soccer Club	882
15	Friday	February 10	7:30pm	Ohio Vortex	W 8–5	11–4	Mockingbird Valley Soccer Club	1,109
16	Friday	February 24	7:30pm	Detroit Waza	L 8–9	11–5	Mockingbird Valley Soccer Club	1,468

† Game also counts for US Open Cup, as listed in chart below.

=== Postseason ===
Game	Day	Date	Kickoff	Opponent	Results		Location	Attendance
Game	Day	Date	Kickoff	Opponent	Final Score	Record	Location	Attendance
1	Friday	March 2	7:35pm	Kansas Magic	L 5–9	0–1	Mockingbird Valley Soccer Club	757

=== 2011–12 United States Open Cup for Arena Soccer ===
Game	Day	Date	Opponent	Results		Location
Game	Day	Date	Opponent	Final Score	Record	Location
Wild-Card	Friday	December 9	Indy Elite FC	W 15–5	1–0	Mockingbird Valley Soccer Club
Round of 16	Friday	December 30	Cincinnati Kings	L 3–9	1–1	Cincinnati Gardens

== Player roster ==
Note: Flags indicate national team as defined under FIFA eligibility rules; some limited exceptions apply. Players may hold more than one non-FIFA nationality.

No.	Pos.	Nation	Player
0	GK	(United States) USA	Keith O'Loane
1	GK	(United States) USA	Frank Peabody
2	MF	(United States) USA	David Horne
4	DF	(United States) USA	Lee Weyland
5	MF	(United States) USA	Darren Yeagle
6	MF	(United States) USA	Othaniel Yanez
7	MF	(United States) USA	Luis Pacheco
8	MF	(United States) USA	JT Murray
9	MF	(Republic of Ireland) IRL	Ross Hopkins
10	MF	(United States) USA	John Michael Hayden

No.	Pos.	Nation	Player
11	DF	(United States) USA	Adam Boyer
12	DF	(United States) USA	Charlie Campbell
13	DF	(United States) USA	Ryan McDonald (C)
14	MF	(United States) USA	Corey Maret
15	DF	(South Africa) RSA	Tee Shipalane
16	FW	(United States) USA	Nick Judah
17	DF	(England) ENG	Oliver Dyson
19	MF	(United States) USA	Chris Markey
22	FW	(United States) USA	Scott Stockum
23	FW	(England) ENG	Simon Bird
