= 2009–10 United States Open Cup for Arena Soccer =

United States Open Cup for Arena Soccer
- Season: 2009-10
- Champions: San Diego Sockers
- Highest scoring: 23 - Louisville 22, West Virginia 1; R of 32
- Longest winning run: 5 - San Diego Fusion, Estadio Azteca
- Highest attendance: 1,547 (Louisville - Semifinal, 2/19/10)

The 2009–10 United States Open Cup for Arena Soccer is the second edition of an open knockout style tournament for Arena/Indoor Soccer. Teams from the Professional Arena Soccer League and Premier Arena Soccer League participated in the Tournament.

== US Arena Open Cup bracket ==
Wild Card Round; December 2009, January 2010
PASL-Pro | (Michigan) Detroit Waza | 9
PASL-Premier | (Ohio) Cincinnati Saints | 2
PASL-Pro | (Kentucky) Louisville Lightning | 22
PASL-Premier | West Virginia Quantum Force | 1
PASL-Pro | (Missouri) St. Louis Illusion | 9
PASL-Premier | (Illinois) Piasa FC | 3
PASL-Pro | California Cougars | 4
PASL-Premier | (California) Estadio Azteca All Stars | 5

Round of 16; December 2009, January 2010
PASL-Pro | (Michigan) Detroit Waza | 17
PASL-Premier | FC Indiana | 4
PASL-Pro | (Kentucky) Louisville Lightning | 18
PASL-Pro | Ohio Vortex | 4
PASL-Pro | (Ohio) 1790 Cincinnati Express | 13
PASL-Premier | (Virginia) Winchester Impact | 4
PASL-Pro | (Missouri) St. Louis Illusion | 4
PASL-Premier | (Missouri) Kansas City Kings | 8
PASL-Pro | Texas Outlaws | 2
PASL-Premier | (Texas) Vitesse Dallas | 11
PASL-Pro | (Colorado) Denver Dynamite | 8
Independent | Colorado Springs Cavaliers | 4
PASL-Premier | (Washington (state)) Tacoma Stars | 6
PASL-Premier | (California) Estadio Azteca All Stars | 7
PASL-Pro | (California) San Diego Sockers | 10
PASL-Premier | (California) San Diego Fusion | 6

Quarterfinals; January 2010, February 2010
PASL-Pro | (Michigan) Detroit Waza | 6
PASL-Pro | (Kentucky) Louisville Lightning | 7
PASL-Pro | (Ohio) 1790 Cincinnati Express | 3
PASL-Premier | (Missouri) Kansas City Kings(Forfeit) | 0
PASL-Premier | (Texas) Vitesse Dallas | 15
PASL-Pro | (Colorado) Denver Dynamite | 2
PASL-Premier | (California) Estadio Azteca All Stars | 5
PASL-Pro | (California) San Diego Sockers | 11

Semifinals; February 19, March 4, 2010
PASL-Pro | (Kentucky) Louisville Lightning | 8
PASL-Pro | (Ohio) 1790 Cincinnati Express | 5
PASL-Premier | (Texas) Vitesse Dallas | 7
PASL-Pro | (California) San Diego Sockers | 11

Final; April 10, 2010
PASL-Pro | (Kentucky) Louisville Lightning | 7
PASL-Pro | (California) San Diego Sockers | 11

== Qualifying ==
- Green indicates qualification for Qualifying Tournament Knockout Round(s)
- Bold Indicates Qualifying Tournament Winner and qualification to US Arena Open Cup

| Place | Team | GP | W/L | Pct | GF | GA |
Rocky Mountain Qualifying - Group Standings (@ Highlands Ranch, CO)
| 1 | Colorado Springs Cavaliers (Independent) | 2 | 2-0 | 1.000 | 11 | 7 |
| 2 | Fort Collins Fury (PASL-Premier) | 2 | 1-1 | .500 | 10 | 10 |
| 3 | Highlands Ranch Heat (PASL-Premier) | 2 | 0-2 | .000 | 5 | 9 |

Group Matches
November 22, 2009

- Colorado Springs Cavaliers 4, Highlands Ranch Heat 2
- Fort Collins Fury 5, Highlands Ranch Heat 3
- Colorado Springs Cavaliers 7, Fort Collins Fury 5

Final
November 22, 2009

- Colorado Springs Cavaliers 10, Fort Collins Fury 7

Colorado Springs Cavaliers qualify for US Arena Open Cup Round of 16

| Place | Team | GP | W/L | Pct | GF | GA |
South Central Qualifying - Group Standings (@ Dallas/Ft Worth, TX)
| 1 | Vitesse Dallas (PASL-Premier) | 2 | 2-0 | 1.000 | 18 | 6 |
| 2 | Niño Soccer Club (PASL-Premier) | 2 | 1-1 | .500 | 8 | 10 |
| 3 | Outlaws Reserves (Independent) | 2 | 0-2 | .000 | 3 | 13 |

Group Matches: November 29, 2009

- Vitesse Dallas 8, Outlaws Reserves 3
- Niño Soccer Club 5, Outlaws Reserves 0
- Vitesse Dallas 10, Niño Soccer Club 3

Vitesse Dallas qualify for US Arena Open Cup Round of 16

| Place | Team | GP | W/L | Pct | GF | GA |
Southwest Qualifying - Group Standings (@ San Diego, CA)
| 1 | San Diego Fusion (PASL-Premier) | 2 | 2-0 | 1.000 | 12 | 5 |
| 2 | Pumitas (Independent) | 2 | 2-0 | 1.000 | 7 | 2 |
| 3 | Revolucion Tijuana (LMFR) | 2 | 1-1 | .500 | 8 | 5 |
| 4 | ASC Hammers (PASL-Premier) | 2 | 1-1 | .500 | 6 | 5 |
| 5 | San Diego Select (Independent) | 2 | 1-1 | .500 | 5 | 6 |
| 6 | Los Angeles Bolts (PASL-Premier) | 2 | 1-1 | .500 | 6 | 11 |
| 7 | San Diego Surf (PASL-Premier) | 2 | 0-2 | .000 | 4 | 7 |
| 8 | Liga Bolts (Independent) | 2 | 0-2 | .000 | 4 | 14 |

Group Matches
December 5, 2009

- 7:00am: Pumitas 3, Liga Bolts 0
- 7:30am: San Diego Fusion 8, Los Angeles Bolts 2
- 8:00am: ASC Hammers 3, San Diego Surf 1
- 8:30am: San Diego Select 3, Revolucion Tijuana 2
- 9:00am: Pumitas 4, San Diego Select 2
- 9:30am: Revolucion Tijuana 6, Liga Bolts 2
- 10:00am: San Diego Fusion 4, ASC Hammers 3
- 10:30am: Los Angeles Bolts 4, San Diego Surf 3

Quarterfinals
December 5, 2009

- 11:00am: San Diego Fusion 8, Liga Bolts 0
- 11:45am: Pumitas 4, San Diego Surf 0
- 12:30pm: Los Angeles Bolts 5, Revolucion Tijuana 2
- 1:15pm: ASC Hammers 5, San Diego Select 1

Semifinals
December 5, 2009

- 2:30pm: San Diego Fusion 5, Los Angeles Bolts 3
- 3:30pm: ASC Hammers 4, Pumitas 2

Final
December 5, 2009

- 4:30pm: San Diego Fusion 5, ASC Hammers 1

San Diego Fusion qualify for US Arena Open Cup Round of 16

| Place | Team | GP | W/L | Pct | GF | GA |
Pacific Qualifying - Group Standings (@ Sacramento, CA)
| 1 | Estadio Azteca All Stars (PASL-Premier) | 2 | 2-0 | 1.000 | 13 | 4 |
| 2 | Chico Bigfoot (PASL-Premier) | 2 | 1-1 | .500 | 3 | 5 |
| 3 | Turlock Express (PASL-Premier) | 2 | 1-1 | .500 | 7 | 11 |
| 4 | Sacramento Scorpions (PASL-Premier) | 2 | 0-2 | .000 | 3 | 6 |

Group Matches
December 12, 2009

- 2:15pm: Turlock Express 3, Sacramento Scorpions 1
- 3:00pm: Estadio Azteca All Stars 3, Chico Bigfoot 0
- 4:00pm: Chico Bigfoot 3, Sacramento Scorpions 2
- 4:45pm: Estadio Azteca All Stars 10, Turlock Express 4

Final
December 12, 2009

- 5:45pm: Estadio Azteca All Stars 8, Chico Bigfoot 3

Estadio Azteca All Stars qualify for US Arena Open Cup Wild Card Round
