= 2009–10 Professional Arena Soccer League season =

Professional Arena Soccer League
- Season: 2009–10
- Champions: San Diego Sockers
- Top goalscorer: 37 - Jeff Hughes
- Highest scoring: 27 - Louisville 15, Detroit 12 (2/26/10)
- Longest winning run: 8 - San Diego
- Highest attendance: 2,997-California(11/8/09, ex.) 2,700(est.)-Winnipeg(2/27/10, reg. season)

2009–10 Professional Arena Soccer League (PASL-Pro) season is the second season for the league. The schedule was announced in September 2009. The season kicked off on Friday November 13, when the expansion Louisville Lightning hosted the 1790 Cincinnati Express.

The San Diego Sockers won the PASL-Pro championship title by defeating La Raza de Guadalajara in the final, 9–8.

== Standings ==
As of March 8, 2010
2009-10 League Championship 2009-10 Playoff Team (Bold indicates Division Winner)

Place	Team	GP	W/L	Pct	GF	GA	Pts
Eastern Conference
**1**	**1790 Cincinnati Express**	**16**	**12-4**	**.750**	**140**	**101**	
2	Louisville Lightning	16	11-5	.688	157	111	
3	Ohio Vortex	16	8-8	.500	120	136	
4	Detroit Waza	16	6-10	.375	122	139	
5	St. Louis Illusion	16	6-10	.375	100	129	
Western Conference
**1**	**San Diego Sockers**	**16**	**13-3**	**.813**	**146**	**91**	
2	California Cougars	16	12-4	.750	136	92	
3	Texas Outlaws	16	9-7	.563	140	126	
4	Denver Dynamite	16	2-14	.125	66	108	
Canadian Major Indoor Soccer League
**1**	**Calgary United FC**	**10**	**8-2**	**.800**	**79**	**32**	**20**
2	Saskatoon Accelerators	12	9-3	.750	69	53	**18**
3	Edmonton Drillers	12	5-7	.417	84	72	**10**
4	Prince George Fury	12	3-9	.250	84	97	**6**
5	Winnipeg Alliance	12	3-9	.250	59	85	**6**
Liga Mexicana Del Futbol Rapido
**1**	**La Raza de Guadalajara***						
2	Sidekicks del Estado de Mexico*						

- La Raza de Guadalajara defeated Sidekicks del Estado de Mexico in a shootout in the 2009-10 LMFR Finals on January 30. The teams will be Mexico's two entrants in the 2010 PASL-Pro North American Finals.

== 2010 PASL-Pro North American Finals (at San Diego, CA) ==
Quarterfinals; March 11
4	Calgary United FC	7
5	California Cougars	8
3	1790 Cincinnati Express	5
6	Sidekicks del Estado de Mexico	6

Semifinals; March 12
1	La Raza de Guadalajara	7
5	California Cougars	5
2	San Diego Sockers	6
6	Sidekicks del Estado de Mexico	5

Final; March 13
1	La Raza de Guadalajara	8
2	San Diego Sockers	9

== Awards ==
Award	Name	Team
MVP	Jeff Hughes	1790 Cincinnati Express
Coach of the Year	Scott Budnick	Louisville Lightning
Playoffs MVP	Riley Swift	San Diego Sockers

=== All-League First Team ===
Name	Position	Team
Dan Antoniuk	D	San Diego Sockers
Jeff Henderson	D	1790 Cincinnati Express
Jeff Hughes	M	1790 Cincinnati Express
Allen Eller	F	Ohio Vortex
Safet Kovacevic	F	Louisville Lightning
Riley Swift	GK	San Diego Sockers

=== All-League Second Team ===
Name	Position	Team
Jonathan Kincheloe	D	Louisville Lightning
Antonio Sutton	D	California Cougars
Paul Wright	M	San Diego Sockers
Brian Farber / Nelson Santana	M	California Cougars
Kraig Chiles	F	San Diego Sockers
Craig Salvati	GK	1790 Cincinnati Express
