= 2011–12 Kansas Magic season =

Kansas Magic
2011–12 season
- Owner: B.J. Latas
- Head Coach: Randall Porter
- Arena: EPIC Indoor Sports Center; Overland Park, Kansas
- Professional Arena Soccer League: 3rd in Eastern Division; Lost in semi-finals
- Top goalscorer: Matt Germain (17 goals, 8 assists)
- Highest home attendance: 548 (December 3, 2011) va Louisville Lightning
- Lowest home attendance: 79 (February 10, 2012) vs Illinois Piasa
- Average home league attendance: 331 (8 regular season home games)

The 2011–12 Kansas Magic season was the first and only season of the Kansas Magic indoor soccer club as a franchise in the Professional Arena Soccer League. The Magic were an Eastern Division team who played this season's home games at EPIC Indoor Sports Center in Overland Park, Kansas. The team was led by head coach Randall Porter.

== Off-field moves ==
In February 2011, the Kansas Magic franchise was announced to begin play with an April 30 exhibition game against the Illinois Piasa at the Kansas Expocentre's Landon Arena in Topeka, Kansas. The team was announced without a signed arena lease as both the franchise and venue wanted to judge response to the exhibition game. When the team began regular play in November 2011, it was instead based out of the Kansas City suburb of Overland Park, Kansas.

The team's dance team, under the direction of Karen Burec, was known as the Magic Jeanies.

== Roster moves ==
The team held its first round of open tryouts on March 19, 2011, at the Topeka Sports Factory in Topeka, Kansas. In April 2011, Graceland University seniors Orin Branker and Kasy Kiarash were signed by the Magic. They joined fellow Graceland Yellowjackets alumni Matt Klaus, Stefan De Las, Brett Porter on the then-current roster.

The team held open tryouts on October 23, 2011, at their regular season home facility, the arena at the EPIC Indoor Sports Center in Overland Park, Kansas.

== Schedule ==
Win Tie Loss

=== Exhibition ===
Game	Day	Date	Kickoff	Opponent	Results		Location	Attendance
Game	Day	Date	Kickoff	Opponent	Final Score	Team Record	Location	Attendance
1	Saturday	April 30	7:35pm	Illinois Piasa	W 7–3	1–0	Landon Arena	1,500
2	Sunday	May 15	4:00pm	Nebraska All-Stars	W 11–4	2–0	Eihusen Arena	600
3	Saturday	July 23	7:00pm	Colorado Blizzard	W 9–4	3–0	EPIC Indoor Sports Center	

=== Regular season ===
Game	Day	Date	Kickoff	Opponent	Results		Location	Attendance
Game	Day	Date	Kickoff	Opponent	Final Score	Team Record	Location	Attendance
1	Saturday	November 5	7:35pm	at Illinois Piasa	W 11–9	1–0	The Sports Academy	658
2	Saturday	November 12	7:35pm	Illinois Piasa	W 4–3	2–0	EPIC Indoor Sports Center	412
3	Sunday	November 20	7:05pm	Detroit Waza	W 8–7	3–0	EPIC Indoor Sports Center	442
4	Saturday	December 3	7:35pm	Louisville Lightning	L 6–8	3–1	EPIC Indoor Sports Center	548
5	Saturday	December 10	7:35pm	at Illinois Piasa	W 7–6	4–1	The Sports Academy	256
6	Friday	January 13	8:05pm (7:05pm Central)	at Cincinnati Kings	L 4–9	4–2	Cincinnati Gardens	785
7	Saturday	January 14	7:35pm (6:35pm Central)	at Detroit Waza	L 7–10	4–3	Taylor Sportsplex	339
8	Sunday	January 22	6:10pm	Cincinnati Kings	W 6–5	5–3	EPIC Indoor Sports Center	398
9	Saturday	January 28	7:35pm	Ohio Vortex	L 6–9	5–4	EPIC Indoor Sports Center	325
10	Sunday	January 29	4:35pm	Louisville Lightning	L 6–7	5–5	EPIC Indoor Sports Center	252
11	Friday	February 3	7:30pm (6:30pm Central)	at Louisville Lightning	L 6–10	5–6	Mockingbird Valley Soccer Complex	882
12	Saturday	February 4	7:35pm (6:35pm Central)	at Cincinnati Kings	L 8–5	5–7	Cincinnati Gardens	1604
13	Friday	February 10	8:05pm	Illinois Piasa	W 8–2	6–7	EPIC Indoor Sports Center	79
14	Sunday	February 12	3:05pm	Detroit Waza	W 11–7	7–7	EPIC Indoor Sports Center	189
15	Friday	February 24	8:00pm (7:00pm Central)	at Ohio Vortex	W 8–7	8–7	Canton Memorial Civic Center	440
16	Saturday	February 25	7:00pm (6:00pm Central)	at Ohio Vortex	L 6–9	8–8	Canton Memorial Civic Center	990

=== Post-season ===
Game	Day	Date	Kickoff	Opponent	Results		Location	Attendance
Game	Day	Date	Kickoff	Opponent	Final Score	Team Record	Location	Attendance
Div	Friday	March 2	7:35pm (6:35pm Central)	at Louisville Lightning	W 9–5	1–0	Mockingbird Valley Soccer Complex	757
Semi	Friday	March 9	8:20pm (9:20pm Central)	at San Diego Sockers	L 6–9	1–1	Chevrolet Del Mar Arena	2,151
