= 2008–09 United States Open Cup for Arena Soccer =

United States Open Cup for Arena Soccer
- Season: 2008-09
- Champions: St. Louis Illusion
- Highest scoring: 19-4 Games
- Longest winning run: 3- Stockton
- Highest attendance: 3,116- Detroit, 1/25/09 (QF)(DH w/ XSL Ignition)

The 2008–09 United States Open Cup for Arena Soccer was the first open knockout style tournament for Arena/Indoor Soccer. In its inaugural season, the St. Louis Illusion were cup winners, due to their victory over the Detroit Waza and the Stockton Cougars inability to field a team for the final due to the late finish of the competition.

== US Arena Open Cup bracket ==
Wild Card Round; December 2008-January 2009
PASL-Premier	(Washington (state)) Tacoma Stars	6
PASL-Premier	(Washington (state)) Wenatchee Fire Reserves	4
PASL-Pro	(Colorado) Denver Dynamite	9
PASL-Premier	(Colorado) Fort Collins Fury	7
PASL-Pro	(Ohio) 1790 Cincinnati	13
PASL-Premier	Maryland Tigers	6

Round of 16; December 2008-January 2009
Independent	(California) San Diego Sockers	7
PASL-Premier	(California) San Diego Fusion	1
PASL-Premier	(California) OTW Santa Clara	3
PASL-Pro	(California) Stockton Cougars	11
PASL-Premier	(Washington (state)) Tacoma Stars	10
PASL-Pro	(Washington (state)) Wenatchee Fire	9
PASL-Pro	Colorado Lightning	4
PASL-Pro	(Colorado) Denver Dynamite	5
PASL-Pro	(Michigan) Detroit Waza	11
PASL-Premier	West Virginia Quantum Force	6
PASL-Pro	(Ohio) 1790 Cincinnati	10
PASL-Premier	(Illinois) Swanner United	1
PASL-Pro	(Illinois) St. Louis Illusion	-
Bye	-
PASL-Premier	(Missouri) Kansas City Kings	-
Bye	-

Quarterfinals; January 2009
Independent	(California) San Diego Sockers	7
PASL-Pro	(California) Stockton Cougars	12
PASL-Premier	(Washington (state)) Tacoma Stars	11
PASL-Pro	(Colorado) Denver Dynamite	2
PASL-Pro	(Michigan) Detroit Waza	6
PASL-Pro	(Ohio) 1790 Cincinnati	1
PASL-Pro	(Illinois) St. Louis Illusion	5
PASL-Premier	(Missouri) Kansas City Kings	3

Semifinals; March 1, April 18
PASL-Pro	(California) Stockton Cougars	11
PASL-Premier	(Washington (state)) Tacoma Stars	8
PASL-Pro	(Michigan) Detroit Waza	3
PASL-Pro	(Illinois) St. Louis Illusion	8

Final †; April 18
PASL-Pro	(Michigan) Detroit Waza	3
PASL-Pro	(Illinois) St. Louis Illusion†	8

† Due to the withdrawal of the Semifinal Winning Stockton Cougars before April 18, what was originally supposed to be a Semifinal Match between the St. Louis Illusion and Detroit Waza became the Championship Match.

== Qualifying ==
Place	Team	GP	W/L	Pct
Southwest Qualifying
1	San Diego Fusion (PASL-Premier)	2	2-0	1.000
2	Pumitas (Independent)	2	1-1	.500
3	San Diego Select (Independent)	2	0-2	.000

San Diego Fusion qualify for US Arena Open Cup Round of 16

Place	Team	GP	W/L/T	Pct
Pacific Qualifying
1	OTW Santa Clara (PASL-Premier)	3	2-0-1	.833
2	Turlock Express (PASL-Premier)	3	1-0-2	.667
3	Chico Bigfoot (PASL-Premier)	3	1-2	.333
4	Sacramento Scorpions (PASL-Premier)	3	0-2-1	.167

Final: November 22, 2008

OTW Santa Clara 7, Turlock Express 2

OTW Santa Clara qualify for US Arena Open Cup Round of 16

Place	Team	GP	W/L	Pct
Rocky Mountain Qualifying
1	Fort Collins Fury (PASL-Premier)	3	3-0	1.000
2	Dynamite Reserves (PASL-Premier)	3	2-1	.667
3	Golden Strikers (PASL-Premier)	3	1-2	.333
4	Nah Nah's (PASL-Premier)	3	0-3	.000

Final
November 30, 2008

- Fort Collins Fury 4, Dynamite Reserves 0

Fort Collins Fury qualify for US Arena Open Cup Wild Card Round
