= 2008–09 Professional Arena Soccer League season =

Professional Arena Soccer League
- Season: 2008–09
- Champions: Stockton Cougars
- Top goalscorer: 40- Bernie Lillavois
- Highest scoring: 31- Denver 22 Golden 9 3/1/09
- Longest winning run: 8- Cincinnati
- Highest attendance: 3,971- Stockton, 2/5/09

The 2008–09 Professional Arena Soccer League (PASL-Pro) is the inaugural season for the league. The PASL-Pro is the largest indoor soccer league, hosting 21 teams spreading from Canada, the United States of America, and the Mexico. All US soccer clubs were invited to play in the United States Open Cup for Arena Soccer which 25 PASL-Pro and PASL-Premier teams, respectively, played in, as well as future PASL-Pro team, the San Diego Sockers.

The league kicked off at the Stockton Arena with the Stockton Cougars defeating the Colorado Lightning 10-5. The regular season concluded March 8, 2009 with three separate matches.

On March 15, 2009 the Stockton Cougars won the inaugural PASL-Pro championship with a 13-5 win over 1790 Cincinnati in the final. Stockton's goalkeeper, Jesus Molina, was named the playoffs MVP.

== Standings ==
As of March 15, 2009
2008-09 League Championship 2008-09 Playoff Team (Bold indicates Division Winner)

Place	Team	GP	W/L	Pct	GF	GA
Eastern Conference
**1**	**1790 Cincinnati**	**16**	**13-3**	**0.813**	**142**	**75**
2	Texas Outlaws	16	8-8	.500	118	148
3	St. Louis Illusion	16	8-8	.500	139	122
4	Detroit Waza	16	7-9	.438	111	127
Western Conference
**1**	**Stockton Cougars**	**16**	**12-4**	**.750**	**197**	**121**
2	Denver Dynamite	16	9-7	.563	133	126
3	Colorado Lightning	16	4-12	.250	77	102
4	Wenatchee Fire	16	2-14	.125	99	182
Canadian Major Indoor Soccer League
**1**	**Edmonton Drillers**	**12**	**9-3**	**.750**	**82**	**80**
2	Calgary United FC	16	8-8	.500	109	84
3	Saskatoon Accelerators	11	5-6	.455	60	53
Liga Mexicana de Futbol Rapido Baja Division
**1**	**Cuernavaca**	**5**	**3-0-2**	**1.000**	**22**	**15**
2	Machado	5	3-2	.600	18	17
3	La Cabana	5	2-1-2	.667	23	18
4	Liverpool	5	2-2-1	.500	23	21
5	Deportivo Lomas	5	2-2-1	.500	13	13
6	UABC Ensenada	5	0-5	.000	0	15
Liga Mexicana de Futbol Rapido Central Division
**1**	**Tigres Dorados MRCI Oaxaca**	**6**	**5-1**	**.833**	**51**	**24**
2	Auge del DF	6	5-1	.833	45	22
3	Constructores de Chilpancingo	6	2-4	.3333	27	48
4	Tecolapan del Estado de Mexico	6	0-6	.000	21	50

== 2009 PASL-Pro North American Finals (at Stockton, CA) ==
Quarterfinals; March 13
3	Edmonton Drillers	8
6	La Cabana	7
4	Tigres Dorados MRCI Oaxaca	10
5	Denver Dynamite	9

Semifinals; March 14
2	Stockton Cougars	10
3	Edmonton Drillers	9
1	1790 Cincinnati	10
4	Tigres Dorados MRCI Oaxaca	6

Final; March 15
2	Stockton Cougars	13
1	1790 Cincinnati	5

== Awards ==
Award	Name	Team
MVP	Brian Farber	Stockton Cougars
Coach of the Year	Craig Rhodis	1790 Cincinnati
Playoffs MVP	Jesus Molina	Stockton Cougars

=== All-League First Team ===
Name	Position	Team
Justin McMillian	D	St. Louis Illusion
Garrett Buck	D	1790 Cincinnati
Brian Farber	M	Stockton Cougars
Aaron Susi	F	Stockton Cougars
Elvir Kafedzic	F	St. Louis Illusion
Craig Salvati	GK	1790 Cincinnati

=== All-League Second Team ===
Name	Position	Team
Jeff Hughes	D	1790 Cincinnati
Pedro Lupercio	D	Stockton Cougars
Majell Aterado	M	Stockton Cougars
Shawn Rockey	M	1790 Cincinnati
Junior Garcia	F	Wenatchee Fire
Bryan Klaus	GK	Calgary United F.C.
