= 2010–11 Professional Arena Soccer League season =

Professional Arena Soccer League
- Season: 2010–11
- Champions: San Diego Sockers
- Top goalscorer: Kraig Chiles, 31
- Highest scoring: 29 – Wenatchee 16, Tijuana 13 (January 23, 2011)
- Longest unbeaten run: 10 – San Diego
- Highest attendance: 3,120 – San Diego (January 29, 2011)

The 2010–11 Professional Arena Soccer League (PASL-Pro) season is the third season for the American arena soccer league. The season kicked off on Friday November 12, when the Louisville Lightning hosted the Cincinnati Kings. A new feature for the 2010–11 season was the Frontier Division. The Frontier Division featured teams above the level of PASL-Premier but not ready for the higher travel demands and costs of the PASL-Pro. Frontier teams played an abbreviated 12-game schedule, with a mixture of PASL-Pro, PASL-Premier, and other Frontier Division opponents. The 2010–2011 PASL playoffs were held in the Cincinnati Gardens, home of the newly rechristened Cincinnati Kings.

== Standings ==
As of March 12, 2011
2010-11 League Championship
2010-11 Playoff Team
(Bold Division Winner)

Place	Team	GP	W	L	T	Pct	GF	GA	GB
Eastern Division
1	Cincinnati Kings	16	13	3	0	.813	127	85	—
2	Louisville Lightning	16	8	8	0	.500	140	117	5
3	Detroit Waza	16	8	8	0	.500	115	116	5
4	Ohio Vortex	16	2	14	0	.125	97	165	11
Western Division
1	San Diego Sockers	16	14	2	0	.875	149	82	—
2	Tacoma Stars	16	10	6	0	.625	110	104	4
3	Revolución Tijuana	15	7	8	0	.467	154	125	6.5
4	California Cougars	15	5	10	0	.333	99	126	8.5
Frontier Division
1	Illinois Piasa	12	9	3	0	.750	99	65	—
2	Kitsap Pumas	12	8	4	0	.667	100	65	1
3	Wenatchee Fire FC	12	4	7	1	.375	68	104	4.5
4	Springfield Demize	12	3	7	2	.333	65	88	5
Canadian Major Indoor Soccer League
1	Calgary United FC	12	8	4	0	.667	68	52	—
2	Edmonton Drillers	12	6	6	0	.500	72	71	2
3	Winnipeg Alliance	12	5	7	0	.417	53	78	3

== PASL Wild Card play-in match ==
Frontier Division Winner vs. Potential Wild Card Team

Fri.Mar.4,9:30 pm ET: Detroit Waza 8, Illinois Piasa 2

- Wild Card qualifier Tacoma advances due to Illinois' loss

== 2011 PASL-Pro North American Finals (Cincinnati, OH) ==
- La Raza de Guadalajara qualifies as LMFR Champion
- PPM Sidekicks del Estado de Mexico qualify as LMFR Runner-Up
- Cincinnati Kings qualify as East Division Champion
- San Diego Sockers qualify as West Division Champion
- Calgary United qualify as CMISL Champion
- Tacoma Stars qualify as PASL Wild Card

Quarterfinals; March 10
4	Calgary United FC	2
5	PPM Sidekicks del Estado de Mexico	10
3	La Raza de Guadalajara	9
6	Tacoma Stars	6

Semifinals; March 11
1	San Diego Sockers	7
5	PPM Sidekicks del Estado de Mexico	3
2	Cincinnati Kings	7
3	La Raza de Guadalajara	11

Final; March 12
1	San Diego Sockers	10
3	La Raza de Guadalajara	6

Thu. March 10, 2011
Quarterfinals

- Quarterfinal A – 6:30 pm – La Raza de Guadalajara 9, Tacoma Stars 6
- Quarterfinal B – 9:00 pm – PPM Sidekicks del Estado de Mexico 10, Calgary United FC 2

Fri. March 11, 2011
Semifinals

- Semifinal A – 6:30 pm – San Diego Sockers 7, PPM Sidekicks del Estado de Mexico 3
- Semifinal B – 9:00 pm – La Raza de Guadalajara 11, Cincinnati Kings 7

Sat. March 12, 2011
Finals

- 7:35 pm – San Diego Sockers 10, La Raza de Guadalajara 6

== Awards ==
Award	Name	Team
MVP	Kraig Chiles	San Diego Sockers
Coach of the Year	Phil Salvagio	San Diego Sockers
Playoffs MVP	Kraig Chiles	San Diego Sockers

=== All-League First Team ===
Name	Position	Team
Dan Antoniuk	D	San Diego Sockers
Ze Roberto	D	San Diego Sockers
Eduardo Velez	M	Revolución Tijuana
Jeff Hughes	F	Cincinnati Kings
Kraig Chiles	F	San Diego Sockers
Craig Salvati	GK	Cincinnati Kings

=== All-League Second Team ===
Name	Position	Team
Jeff Henderson	D	Cincinnati Kings
Antonio Sutton	D	California Cougars
Diego Rovira	M	San Diego Sockers
Costea Decu	M	Detroit Waza
Greg Howes	F	Tacoma Stars
Riley Swift	GK	San Diego Sockers
