= 2012–13 Cincinnati Kings season =

Cincinnati Kings
2012–13 PASL season
- General Manager: Tim Burgess
- Head Coach: Jeff Hughes (games 1-12); Matt Breines (games 13-16)
- Arena: GameTime Training Center; Fairfield, Ohio
- PASL: 2nd, Eastern
- Ron Newman Cup: Lost Division Finals
- US Open Cup: DNP
- Highest home attendance: 344 (February 10, 2013) vs Ohio Vortex
- Lowest home attendance: 161 (January 20, 2013) vs Ohio Vortex
- Average home league attendance: 237 (over 8 home games)

The 2012–13 Cincinnati Kings season was the fifth season of the Cincinnati Kings professional indoor soccer club. The Kings, an Eastern Division team and charter member of the Professional Arena Soccer League, played their home games at the GameTime Training Center in Fairfield, Ohio. The team was led by general manager Tim Burgess.

== Season summary ==
The Kings were successful in the regular season, amassing an 11–5 record and placing second in the PASL's Eastern Division. The team qualified for the postseason and earned the right to play for the Ron Newman Cup in the PASL National Championship. The Kings lost both Eastern Division Finals games to the Detroit Waza and were eliminated from the postseason.

The Kings did not participate in the 2012–13 United States Open Cup for Arena Soccer.

== Roster moves ==
On October 29, 2012, the Kings signed goalkeeper Jamie Lieberman, forward Andy Farrell, defender D.J. Albert, and midfielders Eddie Hertsenberg, Dan Dwyer, and Jeff Hughes. Hughes would also serve as the team's head coach.

On November 15, the team announced the release of forward Andy Farrell and the signings of forward Joshua Henderson plus defenders Roger Straz and Scott Shugh. Farrell re-signed with the Kings on December 14, 2012. On December 15, 2012, the team added defender Danijel Trifkovic to the roster.

Jeff Hughes was the team's head coach (and leading scorer as a midfielder) until he was released on January 25, 2013. (Hughes signed with the Missouri Comets of the MISL the same day.) Matt Breines took over as head coach with Jay Schneider as assistant coach.

On February 1, 2013, the Kings announced the signing of forward Roger Gemoules.

== Awards and honors ==
On November 6, 2012, Kings midfielder (and head coach) Jeff Hughes was named the PASL Player of the Week for his team leadership and his scoring hat-trick against Detroit Waza in the King's season opener.

== Schedule ==
Win Tie Loss

=== Pre-season ===
Game	Day	Date	Kickoff	Opponent	Results		Location	Attendance
Game	Day	Date	Kickoff	Opponent	Final Score	Record	Location	Attendance
1	Saturday	October 20	6:30pm	at Cincinnati Saints (PASL-Premier)	W 5–2	1–0	Tri-County Soccerplex	

=== Regular season ===
Game	Day	Date	Kickoff	Opponent	Results		Location	Attendance
Game	Day	Date	Kickoff	Opponent	Final Score	Record	Location	Attendance
1	Sunday	November 4	6:30pm	Detroit Waza	W 9–8	1–0	GameTime Training Center	245
2	Saturday	November 10	8:00pm	Rockford Rampage	L 1–4	1–1	GameTime Training Center	210
3	Saturday	November 17	7:05pm	at Harrisburg Heat	W 7–4	2–1	Farm Show Arena	1,819
4	Saturday	December 8	7:05pm	at Harrisburg Heat	W 9–8 (OT)	3–1	Farm Show Arena	1,627
5	Friday	December 14	8:00pm	Illinois Piasa	W 5–4	4–1	GameTime Training Center	206
6	Saturday	December 15	7:35pm	at Ohio Vortex	W 10–2	5–1	Pinnacle Sports Complex	243
7	Friday	December 21	8:00pm	Harrisburg Heat	W 7–4	6–1	GameTime Training Center	216
8	Monday	December 31	6:00pm	Chicago Mustangs	L 5–6	6–2	GameTime Training Center	226
9	Saturday	January 5	7:35pm	at Ohio Vortex	W 10–3	7–2	Pinnacle Sports Complex	219
10	Sunday	January 6	2:30pm	at Detroit Waza	L 4–8	7–3	Taylor Sportsplex	347
11	Friday	January 11	7:35pm (8:35pm Eastern)	at Illinois Piasa	L 4–7	7–4	The Sports Academy	362
12	Sunday	January 20	6:00pm	Ohio Vortex	W 12–2	8–4	GameTime Training Center	161
13	Saturday	February 2	7:35pm (8:35pm Eastern)	at Illinois Piasa	W 5–3	9–4	The Sports Academy	315
14	Saturday	February 9	7:30pm	at Detroit Waza	L 3–5	9–5	Taylor Sportsplex	582
15	Sunday	February 10	6:00pm	Ohio Vortex	W 16–1	10–5	GameTime Training Center	344
16	Saturday	February 16	8:00pm	Illinois Piasa	W 11–2	11–5	GameTime Training Center	284

=== Postseason ===
Round	Day	Date	Kickoff	Opponent	Results		Location	Attendance
Round	Day	Date	Kickoff	Opponent	Final Score	Record	Location	Attendance
Division Finals Game 1	Saturday	February 23	8:30pm	Detroit Waza	L 4–9	0–1	GameTime Training Center	307
Division Finals Game 2	Sunday	February 24	2:35pm	at Detroit Waza	L 5–6	0–2	Melvindale Ice Arena	680
