= Chuck Salas =

American soccer player

Chuck Robert Salas
Personal information
- Date of birth: August 18, 1977 (age 49)
- Place of birth: Dallas, Texas, United States
- Height: 5 ft 11 in (1.80 m)
- Position: Forward

Team information
- Current team: Texas Outlaws
- Number: 11

Senior career*
Years	Team	Apps	(Gls)
1995–1996	Texas Lightning (semi-pro indoor)	5	(6)
1996–1997	Mesquite Kickers (semi-pro indoor)	8	(10)
1997–1999	Dallas Sidekicks (Professional indoor)	3	(1)
2008–2010	Texas Outlaws (Professional indoor)	5	(5)
- * Club domestic league appearances and goals

Chuck Robert Salas (born in Dallas, Texas) was an American soccer forward who has played in the Continental Indoor Soccer League, Premier Soccer Alliance and USISL. Salas last played for the Texas Outlaws in the Professional Arena Soccer League.

Salas attended Nimitz High School in Irving, Texas. He played at least one season with the Texas Lightning during the 1995-1996 USISL indoor season. He then played for the Mesquite Kickers during the 1996–1997 season. He signed with the Dallas Sidekicks of the Continental Indoor Soccer League as a free agent for 1997 season. In 1998, the Sidekicks moved to the Premier Soccer Alliance. Salas earned one championship ring with the 1998 Dallas Sidekicks and scored his first professional goal on August 10, 1997, against Detroit Safari with an assist from David Doyle. Salas retired in 2010, playing his last game in California against the San Diego Sockers.
