= 2012–13 Detroit Waza season =

Detroit Waza
2012–13 PASL season
- Owner: Mario Scicluna
- Head Coach: Dominic Scicluna; Matt Johnson
- Arena: Taylor Sportsplex; Taylor, Michigan
- PASL: 1st, Eastern
- Ron Newman Cup: Lost Final
- US Open Cup: Champions
- Highest home attendance: 582 (February 9, 2013) vs Cincinnati Kings
- Lowest home attendance: 347 (January 6, 2013) vs Cincinnati Kings
- Average home league attendance: 410 (over 8 home games)

The 2012–13 Detroit Waza season was the fifth season of the Detroit Waza professional indoor soccer club, also known as Detroit Waza Flo Pro FC. The Waza, an Eastern Division team and charter member of the Professional Arena Soccer League, played their regular season home games in the Taylor Sportsplex in Taylor, Michigan. Post-season home matches were played at the Melvindale Ice Arena in Melvindale, Michigan. The team was led by owner Mario Scicluna, general manager Kathy Coyne, and head coaches Dominic Scicluna and Matt Johnson.

== Season summary ==
Detroit was very successful in the regular season, finishing 14–2 and clinching the Eastern Division title for the second consecutive year. The team was a perfect 8–0 at home with its only two losses (a close match against the Cincinnati Kings and an upset by the Harrisburg Heat) coming on the road. The Waza advanced to the postseason and earned the right to play for the Ron Newman Cup in the PASL National Championship. The Waza defeated the Cincinnati Kings in two straight games, winning the Eastern Divisional Finals and advancing to the Semi-Finals in San Diego, California, where they defeated the Rio Grande Valley Flash in overtime. The team played the San Diego Sockers for the league championship and lost 6–8 in regulation.

The Waza won the 2012–13 United States Open Cup for Arena Soccer. They received a bye in the wild-card round then defeated the Ohio Vortex in the Round of 16, the Harrisburg Heat in the Quarter-Finals, the Chicago Mustangs in the Semi-Finals, and the reigning Open Cup champion San Diego Sockers in the Championship game.

== Awards and honors ==
On January 8, 2013, the Professional Arena Soccer League named Detroit goalkeeper Joe Kapinos as its Player of the Week. Citing the rookie's 8–0 record, including two wins the previous weekend, and his low 4.13 goals against average, the league described Kapinos as "the anchor of the Detroit Waza defense this season".

On January 15, 2013, the PASL named Detroit player Ricardo Lopes as its Player of the Week. Citing his 7 goals against the Harrisburg Heat the previous weekend, the underused Lopes helped the Waza improve to 10–1 on the season.

In postseason honors, defender Costea Decu was named to the 2012-13 PASL All-League First Team and goalkeeper Joey Kapinos was named to the 2012-13 PASL All-League Second Team.

== Schedule ==
Win Tie Loss

=== Regular season ===
| Game | Day | Date | Kickoff | Opponent | Results | | Location | Attendance |
| Game | Day | Date | Kickoff | Opponent | Final Score | Record | Location | Attendance |
|---|---|---|---|---|---|---|---|---|
| 1 | Saturday | November 3 | 7:35pm (8:35pm Eastern) | at Illinois Piasa | W 11–5 | 1–0 | The Sports Academy | 515 |
| 2 | Sunday | November 4 | 6:30pm | at Cincinnati Kings | L 8–9 | 1–1 | GameTime Training Center | 245 |
| 3 | Saturday | November 10 | 7:30pm | Ohio Vortex | W 12–1 | 2–1 | Taylor Sportsplex | 437 |
| 4 | Sunday | November 18 | 2:30pm | Illinois Piasa | W 12–4 | 3–1 | Taylor Sportsplex | 353 |
| 5 | Saturday | December 1 | 7:30pm | Chicago Mustangs | W 8–7 | 4–1 | Taylor Sportsplex | 428 |
| 6 | Saturday | December 8 | 7:35pm | at Ohio Vortex† | W 13–3 | 5–1 | Pinnacle Sports Complex | 176 |
| 7 | Saturday | December 15 | 7:05pm | at Harrisburg Heat | W 6–3 | 6–1 | Farm Show Arena | 1,735 |
| 8 | Friday | January 4 | 7:35pm | at Ohio Vortex | W 8–2 | 7–1 | Pinnacle Sports Complex | 160 |
| 9 | Sunday | January 6 | 2:30pm | Cincinnati Kings | W 8–4 | 8–1 | Taylor Sportsplex | 347 |
| 10 | Saturday | January 12 | 7:30pm | Harrisburg Heat† | W 8–4 | 9–1 | Taylor Sportsplex | 417 |
| 11 | Sunday | January 13 | 2:30pm | Harrisburg Heat | W 15–8 | 10–1 | Taylor Sportsplex | 351 |
| 12 | Saturday | January 19 | 7:05pm | at Harrisburg Heat | L 6–10 | 10–2 | Farm Show Arena | 1,735 |
| 13 | Saturday | January 26 | 8:05pm (9:05pm Eastern) | at Rockford Rampage | W 14–10 | 11–2 | Victory Sports Complex | 200 |
| 14 | Sunday | January 27 | 5:30pm (6:30pm Eastern) | at Chicago Mustangs† | W 9–6 | 12–2 | Grand Sports Arena | 299 |
| 15 | Saturday | February 2 | 7:30pm | Ohio Vortex | W 19–1 | 13–2 | Taylor Sportsplex | 367 |
| 16 | Saturday | February 9 | 7:30pm | Cincinnati Kings | W 5–3 | 14–2 | Taylor Sportsplex | 582 |

† Game also counts for US Open Cup, as listed in chart below.

=== Postseason ===
| Round | Day | Date | Kickoff | Opponent | Results | | Location | Attendance |
| Round | Day | Date | Kickoff | Opponent | Final Score | Record | Location | Attendance |
|---|---|---|---|---|---|---|---|---|
| Division Finals Game 1 | Saturday | February 23 | 8:30pm | at Cincinnati Kings | W 9–4 | 1–0 | GameTime Training Center | 307 |
| Division Finals Game 2 | Sunday | February 24 | 2:35pm | Cincinnati Kings | W 6–5 | 2–0 | Melvindale Ice Arena | 680 |
| Semi-Finals | Sunday | March 10 | 4:00pm (7:00pm Eastern) | Rio Grande Valley Flash | W 6–5 (OT) | 3–0 | Valley View Casino Center | ? |
| Championship | Monday | March 11 | 7:35pm (10:35pm Eastern) | at San Diego Sockers | L 6–8 | 3–1 | Valley View Casino Center | 3,336 |

=== 2012–13 US Open Cup for Arena Soccer ===
| Game | Date | Kickoff | Opponent | Results | | Location | Attendance |
| Game | Date | Kickoff | Opponent | Final Score | Record | Location | Attendance |
|---|---|---|---|---|---|---|---|
| Wild Card | BYE | | | | | | |
| Round of 16 | December 8 | 7:35pm | at Ohio Vortex | W 13–3 | 1–0 | Pinnacle Sports Complex | 176 |
| Quarter-finals | January 12 | 7:35pm | Harrisburg Heat | W 8–4 | 2–0 | Taylor Sportsplex | 417 |
| Semi-finals | January 27 | 4:30pm (5:30pm Eastern) | at Chicago Mustangs | W 9–6 | 3–0 | Grand Sports Arena | 299 |
| Championship | March 2 | 7:35pm | San Diego Sockers | W 7–6 | 4–0 | Melvindale Ice Arena | 1,256 |

== Roster ==
Note: Flags indicate national team as defined under FIFA eligibility rules; some limited exceptions apply. Players may hold more than one non-FIFA nationality.

| No. | Pos. | Nation | Player |
|---|---|---|---|
| 1 | GK | USA | Joey Kapinos |
| 2 | DF | USA | Scott Wright (footballer) |
| 3 | MF | MLT | Tino Scicluna |
| 4 | DF | USA | Darrel Quinn |
| 5 | MF | SRB | Michael Grba |
| 6 | FW | HON | Nelson Diaz |
| 7 | MF | SRB | Miki Djerisilo |
| 9 | FW | LBR | Worteh Sampson |
| 10 | FW | ROU | Costea Decu |

| No. | Pos. | Nation | Player |
|---|---|---|---|
| 11 | MF | USA | Aaron Byrd |
| 12 | MF | USA | Nate Robinson |
| 14 | MF | MLT | Dominic Scicluna |
| 15 | MF | USA | Tommy Stark |
| 17 | DF | USA | Zack Wilkes |
| 18 | FW | USA | Zane Polack |
| 23 | GK | ENG | Kris Lyons |
| 24 | DF | BRA | Ricardo Lopes |
| 22 | MF | MLT | Mario Scicluna |
