= 2010–11 United States Open Cup for Arena Soccer =

US Open Arena Soccer Championship
- Season: 2010-11
- Champions: San Diego Sockers
- Highest scoring: 28 - Louisville 25, Evansville 3; Round of 16 & Louisville 23, AAFC 5; Quarterfinals
- Longest unbeaten run: 5 - Dream Team
- Highest attendance: 3,063 (San Diego - Final, 3/19/11)

The 2010-11 US Open Cup for Arena Soccer is the third edition of an open knockout style tournament for arena/indoor soccer. Teams from the Professional Arena Soccer League and Premier Arena Soccer League participated in the tournament.

== US Open Arena Soccer Championship bracket ==
Round of 16; December 2010
PASL-Pro	(Kentucky) Louisville Lightning	25
PASL-Premier	(Indiana) Evansville Crush	3
PASL-Pro	(Michigan) Detroit Waza	6
Independent	(Indiana) A.A.F.C.	7
PASL-Pro	(Missouri) Springfield Demize	7
PASL-Pro	Illinois Piasa	14
PASL-Pro	(Ohio) Cincinnati Kings	11
PASL-Pro	Ohio Vortex	8
PASL-Pro	(Washington (state)) Tacoma Stars	13
Independent	(Washington (state)) Dream Team	5
PASL-Pro	California Cougars	8
Independent	(California) Top Notch San Jose	7
PASL-Pro	(California) San Diego Sockers	7
PASL-Premier	(California) San Diego Fusion	5
PASL-Premier	(Nevada) Las Vegas Knights	7
PASL-Premier	(Colorado) Fort Collins Fury	4

Quarterfinals; January/February 2011
PASL-Pro	(Kentucky) Louisville Lightning	23
Independent	(Indiana) A.A.F.C.	5
PASL-Pro	Illinois Piasa	2
PASL-Pro	(Ohio) Cincinnati Kings	11
PASL-Pro	(Washington (state)) Tacoma Stars	7
PASL-Pro	California Cougars	5
PASL-Pro	(California) San Diego Sockers	10
PASL-Premier	(Nevada) Las Vegas Knights	9

Semifinals; February 2011
PASL-Pro	(Kentucky) Louisville Lightning (Forfeit)	0
PASL-Pro	(Ohio) Cincinnati Kings	3
PASL-Pro	(Washington (state)) Tacoma Stars	0
PASL-Pro	(California) San Diego Sockers	5

Final; March 19, 2011
PASL-Pro	(Ohio) Cincinnati Kings	6
PASL-Pro	(California) San Diego Sockers	13

== Confirmed dates and matchups ==
All times local

=== Round of 16 ===
- Sat. Dec. 4, 3:05pm - California Cougars (PASL-Pro) 8, Top Notch San Jose (Independent) 7
- Sat. Dec. 4, 7:30pm - Cincinnati Kings (PASL-Pro) 11, Ohio Vortex (PASL-Pro) 8 (Doubles as regular season match)
- Fri. Dec. 10, 8:00pm - Louisville Lightning (PASL-Pro) 25, Evansville Crush (PASL-Premier) 3
- Sat. Dec. 11, 1:00pm - Las Vegas Knights (PASL-Premier) 7, Fort Collins Fury (PASL-Premier) 4
- Sat. Dec. 11, 8:00pm - Illinois Piasa (PASL-Pro) 14, Springfield Demize (PASL-Pro) 7 (Doubles as regular season match)
- Sat. Dec. 18, 7:00pm - A.A.F.C. (Independent) 7, Detroit Waza (PASL-Pro) 6
- Sat. Dec. 18, 7:05pm - Tacoma Stars (PASL-Pro) 13, Dream Team (Independent) 5
- Wed. Dec. 29, 6:15pm - San Diego Sockers (PASL-Pro) 7, San Diego Fusion (PASL-Premier) 5

=== Quarterfinals ===
- Fri. Jan. 7, 8:30pm - Louisville Lightning (PASL-Pro) 23, A.A.F.C. (Independent) 5
- Sat. Jan. 15,7:05pm - Tacoma Stars (PASL-Pro) 7, California Cougars (PASL-Pro) 5 (Doubles as regular season match)
- Fri. Jan. 21,7:05pm - San Diego Sockers (PASL-Pro) 10 Las Vegas Knights (PASL-Premier) 9
- Fri. Feb. 4, 7:35pm - Cincinnati Kings (PASL-Pro) 11, Illinois Piasa (PASL-Pro) 2 (Doubles as regular season match)

=== Semifinals ===
- Sat. Feb. 5, 7:30pm - San Diego Sockers (PASL-Pro) 5, Tacoma Stars (PASL-Pro) 0 (Doubles as regular season match)
- Fri. Feb. 18, 7:35pm - Cincinnati Kings (PASL-Pro) 3, Louisville Lightning (PASL-Pro) 0 (Forfeit)

=== Finals ===
- Sat. Mar. 19,6:15pm - San Diego Sockers (PASL-Pro) 13, Cincinnati Kings (PASL-Pro) 6

== Qualifying ==
- Green indicates qualification for Qualifying Tournament Knockout Round(s)
- Bold Indicates Qualifying Tournament Winner and qualification to US Arena Open Cup
- All times local

Place	Team	GP	W/L	Pct	GF	GA
Evansville Qualifying - Group Standings (@ Evansville, IN)
1	Evansville Crush (PASL-Premier)	4	4-0	1.000	31	15
2	Louisville Lightning Reserves (PASL-Premier)	4	2-2	.500	10	6
3	Rochester Rhinos-Indiana (Independent)	4	3-1	.750	11	7
4	UFC Eagles (Independent)	4	1-3	.250	10	15
5	Piasa FC (PASL-Premier)	3	1-2	.333	7	12
6	Paducah Wildcats (PASL-Premier)	3	0-3	.000	12	27

Group Matches
Sat. Oct. 9, 2010

- 12:00pm - Rochester Rhinos-Indiana 7, Paducah Wildcats 3
- 1:30pm - Louisville Lightning Reserves 5, UFC Eagles 1
- 3:00pm - Evansville Crush 6, Piasa FC 2
- 5:30pm - Louisville Lightning Reserves 2, Rochester Rhinos-Indiana 1
- 7:00pm - Evansville Crush 14, Paducah Wildcats 4
- 8:30pm - Piasa FC 5, UFC Eagles 3

Group Matches
Sun. Oct. 10, 2010

- 9:00am - Rochester Rhinos-Indiana 3, Piasa FC 2
- 10:30am - UFC Eagles 6, Paducah Wildcats 5
- 12:00pm - Evansville Crush 4, Louisville Lightning Reserves 3

Third Place
Sun. Oct. 10, 2010

- 1:30pm - Rochester Rhinos-Indiana 7, UFC Eagles 4

Final
Sun. Oct. 10, 2010

- 3:00pm - Evansville Crush 7, Louisville Lightning Reserves 6 (OT)

Evansville Crush qualify for US Arena Open Cup Round of 16

Place	Team	GP	W/L	Pct	GF	GA
Lafayette Qualifying - Group A Standings (@ Lafayette, IN)
1	Madison Fire (NPSL)	3	3-0	1.000	11	4
2	A.A.F.C. (Independent)	3	1-1-1	.333	14	12
3	FC Indiana (PASL-Premier)	3	1-1-1	.333	10	8
4	U. of Illinois (College Club)	3	0-3	.000	7	18
Lafayette Qualifying - Group B Standings (@ Lafayette, IN)
1	Cincinnati Saints (PASL-Premier)	3	3-0	1.000	20	8
2	B.R.S.C. (Independent)	3	2-1	.667	18	12
3	Indiana U. (College Club)	3	1-2	.333	10	15
4	Rochester Rhinos-Indiana (Independent)	3	0-3	.000	5	18

Group Matches
Sat. Nov. 13, 2010

- 11:00am - Cincinnati Saints 7, B.R.S.C. 5
- 12:00pm - Indiana U. 5, Rochester Rhinos-Indiana 2
- 1:00pm - FC Indiana 3, A.A.F.C. 3
- 2:00pm - Madison Fire 4, U. of Illinois 0
- 3:00pm - Cincinnati Saints 6, Rochester Rhinos-Indiana 2
- 4:00pm - B.R.S.C. 6, Indiana U. 4
- 5:00pm - Madison Fire 3, FC Indiana 1
- 6:00pm - A.A.F.C. 8, U. of Illinois 5

Group Matches
Sun. Nov. 14, 2010

- 9:00am - B.R.S.C. 7, Rochester Rhinos-Indiana 1
- 10:00am - Madison Fire 4, A.A.F.C. 3
- 11:00am - Cincinnati Saints 7, Indiana U. 1
- 12:00pm - FC Indiana 6, U. of Illinois 2

Semifinals
Sun. Nov. 14, 2010

- 1:30pm - B.R.S.C. 5, Madison Fire 3
- 2:30pm - A.A.F.C. 6, Cincinnati Saints 4

Final
Sun. Nov. 14, 2010

- 4:00pm - B.R.S.C. 5, A.A.F.C. 4

B.R.S.C. qualify for US Arena Open Cup Round of 16, drop out, and replaced by runner up, A.A.F.C.

Place	Team	GP	W/L	Pct	GF	GA
Tacoma Qualifying - Group Standings (@ Tacoma, WA)
1	Dream Team (Independent)	3	3-0	1.000	19	1
2	Oly Boys (Independent)	3	2-0-1	.833	10	3
3	Agudelo (Independent)	3	2-1	.667	16	7
4	Doyles (Independent)	4	2-2	.500	11	9
5	DESNA (Independent)	3	1-1-1	.500	5	4
6	Balls Deep (Independent)	3	1-1-1	.500	6	7
7	Rangers (Independent)	3	1-2	.333	4	14
8	Big Danglers (Independent)	3	0-2-1	.167	6	9
9	SEA United (Independent)	3	0-3	.000	0	23

Group Matches
Sat. Nov. 27, 2010; 12:00pm–8:00pm

- Agudelo 13, SEA United 0
- Balls Deep 2, DESNA 2
- Big Danglers 2, Oly Boys 2
- Dream Team 8, Rangers 1
- Doyles 8, SEA United 0
- Agudelo 3, Balls Deep 0
- Oly Boys 3, Doyles 0
- Rangers 2, DESNA 1
- Doyles 3, Big Danglers 2
- Dream Team 7, Agudelo 0
- Oly Boys 5, Rangers 1
- Balls Deep 4, Big Danglers 2
- DESNA 2, SEA United 0
- Dream Team 4, Doyles 0

Semifinals
Sat. Nov. 27, 2010

- Dream Team 3, Doyles 2
- Agudelo 4, Oly Boys 3

Finals
Sat. Nov. 27, 2010

- Dream Team 4, Agudelo 2

Dream Team qualify for US Arena Open Cup Round of 16

Place	Team	GP	W/L	Pct	GF	GA
Lindsay Qualifying - Group A Standings (@ Lindsay, CA)
1	Top Notch San Jose (Independent)	2	2-0	1.000	11	2
2	Turlock Express (PASL-Premier)	2	1-1	.500	6	6
3	Internacional (Independent)	2	0-2	.000	3	12
Lindsay Qualifying - Group B Standings (@ Lindsay, CA)
1	Sequoia FC (PASL-Premier)	2	2-0	1.000	11	3
2	Chico Bigfoot (PASL-Premier)	2	1-1	.500	8	4
3	McFarland Cougars (Independent)	2	0-2	.000	3	15

Group Matches
Sat. Nov. 6, 2010

- 2:00pm - Sequoia FC 8, McFarland Cougars 2
- 2:00pm - Turlock Express 5, Internacional 2
- 2:45pm - McFarland Cougars 1, Chico Bigfoot 7
- 2:45pm - Internacional 1, Top Notch San Jose 7
- 3:30pm - Sequoia FC 3, Chico Bigfoot 1
- 3:30pm - Top Notch San Jose 4, Turlock Express 1

Quarterfinals
Sat. Nov. 6, 2010

- 4:15pm - Turlock Express 6, McFarland Cougars 1
- 4:15pm - Chico Bigfoot 8, Internacional 2

Semifinals
Sat. Nov. 6, 2010

- 5:00pm - Sequoia FC 4, Turlock Express 0
- 5:00pm - Top Notch San Jose 4, Chico Bigfoot 1

Finals
Sat. Nov. 6, 2010

- 6:00pm - Sequoia FC 4, Top Notch San Jose 2

Sequoia FC qualify for US Arena Open Cup Round of 16, drop out, and replaced by runner up, Top Notch San Jose

Place	Team	GP	W/L	Pct	GF	GA	Pts
San Diego Qualifying - Group Standings (@ San Diego, CA)
1	San Diego Fusion (PASL-Premier)	2	2-0	1.000	24	7	30
2	Arizona Heat (PASL-Premier)	2	2-0	1.000	16	3	29
3	Los Angeles Bolts (PASL-Premier)	2	1-1	.500	10	8	19
4	CF Revolucion Tijuana (PASL-Premier)	2	1-1	.500	9	16	18
5	San Diego Crew (Independent)	2	1-1	.500	15	6	16
6	Oceanside All-Stars (Independent)	2	0-2	.000	6	18	6
7	San Marcos All-Stars (Independent)	2	0-2	.000	4	26	4

Group Matches
Sat. Dec. 4, 2010

- 9:00am - San Diego Fusion 12, CF Revolucion Tijuana 4
- 10:00am - Arizona Heat 4, San Diego Crew 1
- 11:00am - Los Angeles Bolts 6, Oceanside All-Stars 3
- 12:00pm - San Diego Crew 14, San Marcos All-Stars 2
- 1:00pm - San Diego Fusion 12, Oceanside All-Stars 3
- 2:00pm - Arizona Heat 12, San Marcos All-Stars 2
- 3:00pm - CF Revolucion Tijuana 5, Los Angeles Bolts 4

Quarterfinals
Sun. Dec. 5, 2010

- 9:00am - CF Revolucion Tijuana 4, San Diego Crew 3
- 11:00am - Los Angeles Bolts 12, Oceanside All-Stars 2

Semifinals
Sun. Dec. 5, 2010

- 12:00pm - San Diego Fusion 8, CF Revolucion Tijuana 2
- 1:00pm - Arizona Heat 7, Los Angeles Bolts 2

Finals
Sun. Dec. 5, 2010

- 2:30pm - San Diego Fusion 2, Arizona Heat 1

San Diego Fusion qualify for US Arena Open Cup Round of 16

Point System: Win = 10 Pts, Tie = 5 Pts, Shut Out = 1 Pt(No Pts for 0-0 Tie), Goals = 1 Pt for Every Goal Up To 5, 1 Pt Deduction for Every Red Card Given To a Player or a Coach

Rocky Mountain Qualifying - Sun. Nov. 14, 2010 (at Edwards, Colorado)

Semifinals; 11:00am,12:00pm
PASL-Premier	(Colorado) Edwards Freedom	6
Independent	(Colorado) Edwards Freedom Development	2
PASL-Premier	(Colorado) Fort Collins Fury	12
Independent	(Colorado) Duendes Grand Junction	1

Final; 2:00pm
PASL-Premier	(Colorado) Edwards Freedom	6
PASL-Premier	(Colorado) Fort Collins Fury	7

Fort Collins Fury qualify for US Arena Open Cup Round of 16
