= Denver Dynamite =

Denver Dynamite may refer to:

- Denver Dynamite (soccer), professional arena soccer team currently in the Professional Arena Soccer League (PASL-Pro)
- Denver Dynamite (arena football), professional arena football team formerly in the Arena Football League (AFL)
