= 2013–14 Detroit Waza season =

Detroit Waza
2013–14 PASL season
- Owner: Mario Scicluna
- Head Coaches: Matt Johnson; Dominic Scicluna
- Arena: Melvindale Ice Arena; 4300 South Dearborn St. Melvindale, Michigan 48122
- Ron Newman Cup: Eastern Division Final
- US Open Cup: Round of 16
- Highest home attendance: 1,011 (December 28 vs. Cincinnati Saints)
- Lowest home attendance: 203 (December 14 vs. Chicago Mustangs)
- Average home league attendance: 565 (7 games)

The 2013–14 Detroit Waza season was the sixth season of the Detroit Waza professional indoor soccer club, also known as Detroit Waza Flo Pro FC. The Waza, an Eastern Division team and charter member of the Professional Arena Soccer League, played their home games in the Melvindale Ice Arena in the Detroit suburb of Melvindale, Michigan. The team was led by general manager Valentino Scicluna and head coaches Matt Johnson and Dominic Scicluna.

== Season summary ==
The Waza started the season on a down note, losing in overtime at home to the Harrisbrg Heat, rebounded to win 3 straight, then lost their next 3. After the Christmas break, Detroit won 7 of their next 8 games and finished the season 10–5. (A scheduled home match against the Illinois Piasa was cancelled.) This was good enough for 2nd place the Eastern Division and entry into the post-season. Detroit fell to the Cleveland Freeze 6–5 in the Eastern Division Final, ending their playoff run.

After receiving a bye in the Round of 32, the Detroit Waza participated in the 2013–14 United States Open Cup for Arena Soccer starting with a game against the Harrisburg Heat in the Round of 16 on December 21. Harrisburg won the match, ending Detroit's 2013–14 tournament run. The Waza were the defending tournament champions.

== Off-field moves ==
The Waza organization has a long history of community involvement and operates more than 100 youth soccer teams in the Detroit area. For the 2013–14 season, the team worked with local charity Hooligans For Heroes to raise funds for the Wounded Warrior Project. A portion of each ticket sold went to the veterans service organization.

== Awards and honors ==
On December 3, 2013, the Professional Arena Soccer League named midfielder Miki Djerisilo as the PASL Player of the Week. The league cited his team-leading scoring and his offensive work in the previous weekend's matches.

On February 18, 2014, the PASL named goalkeeper Joey Kapinos as its Player of the Week. The league cited his back-to-back one goal road wins, earning his team a bye in the first round of the playoffs.

On February 26, 2014, the PASL announced its "All-League" honors. Forward Costea Decu was one of six players named to the All-League Second Team.

== Schedule ==
Win Loss Bye

=== Regular season ===
| Game | Day | Date | Kickoff | Opponent | Results | | Location | Attendance |
| Game | Day | Date | Kickoff | Opponent | Score | Record | Location | Attendance |
|---|---|---|---|---|---|---|---|---|
| 1 | Saturday | November 9 | 7:05pm | Harrisburg Heat | L 7–8 (OT) | 0–1 | Melvindale Civic Center | 714 |
| 2 | Saturday | November 16 | 7:35pm | at Harrisburg Heat | W 8–5 | 1–1 | Farm Show Complex Equine Arena | 1,605 |
| 3 | Saturday | November 30 | 7:05pm | Cleveland Freeze | W 8–7 | 2–1 | Melvindale Civic Center | 613 |
| 4 | Saturday | December 7 | 6:35pm | at Illinois Piasa | W 9–5 | 3–1 | The Field Sports Complex | 368 |
| 5 | Sunday | December 8 | 3:05pm | at Chicago Mustangs | L 9–13 | 3–2 | Grand Sports Arena | 565 |
| 6 | Saturday | December 14 | 7:05pm | Chicago Mustangs | L 5–6 | 3–3 | Melvindale Civic Center | 203 |
| 7 | Saturday | December 21 | 7:05pm | at Harrisburg Heat† | L 8–9 | 3–4 | Farm Show Complex Equine Arena | 1,590 |
| 8 | Saturday | December 28 | 7:05pm | Cincinnati Saints | W 12–6 | 4–4 | Melvindale Civic Center | 1,011 |
| 9 | Saturday | January 4 | 7:35pm | at Cincinnati Saints | W 6–4 | 5–4 | Tri-County Soccerplex | 225 |
| 10 | Saturday | January 11 | 7:05pm | at Cleveland Freeze | L 11–14 | 5–5 | Soccer Sportsplex | 594 |
| 11 | Sunday | January 12 | 3:05pm | Harrisburg Heat | W 12–6 | 6–5 | Melvindale Civic Center | 356 |
| 12 | Saturday | January 25 | 7:05pm | Cincinnati Saints | W 6–3 | 7–5 | Melvindale Civic Center | 485 |
| 13 | Saturday | February 1 | 7:05pm | Cleveland Freeze | W 17–7 | 8–5 | Melvindale Civic Center | 575 |
| 14 | Saturday | February 15 | 7:35pm | at Cincinnati Saints | W 8–7 (OT) | 9–5 | Tri-County Soccerplex | 649 |
| 15 | Sunday | February 16 | 3:05pm | at Cleveland Freeze | W 8–7 | 10–5 | Soccer Sportsplex | 506 |
| 16 | Saturday | February 22♥ | 7:00pm | Illinois Piasa | CANCELLED | 10–5 | Melvindale Civic Center | N/A |

† Game also counts for US Open Cup, as listed in chart below.
♥ Postponed from January 5 due to extreme winter weather then postponed again from January 26 due to a scheduling conflict

=== Post-season ===
| Round | Day | Date | Kickoff | Opponent | Results | | Location | Attendance |
| Round | Day | Date | Kickoff | Opponent | Score | Record | Location | Attendance |
|---|---|---|---|---|---|---|---|---|
| Eastern Division Final | Saturday | March 8 | 7:05pm | Cleveland Freeze | L 5–6 | 0–1 | Melvindale Civic Center | 1,218 |

=== U.S. Open Cup for Arena Soccer ===
| Game | Day | Date | Kickoff | Opponent | Results | | Location | Attendance |
| Game | Day | Date | Kickoff | Opponent | Score | Record | Location | Attendance |
|---|---|---|---|---|---|---|---|---|
| Round of 32 | BYE | | | | | | | |
| Round of 16 | Saturday | December 21 | 7:05pm | at Harrisburg Heat | L 8–9 | 0–1 | Farm Show Complex Equine Arena | 1,590 |
