= 2014–15 Detroit Waza season =

Detroit Waza
2014–15 MASL season
- Owner: Mario Scicluna
- Head Coach: Costea Decu
- Arena: Melvindale Civic Center; Melvindale, Michigan
- Major Arena Soccer League: 4th, Eastern (regular season)
- Top goalscorer: Miki Djerisilo (20 goals, 10 assists)
- Highest home attendance: 756 (November 1 vs. Harrisburg Heat)
- Lowest home attendance: 521 (February 7 vs. Harrisburg Heat)
- Average home league attendance: 618 (10 games)

The 2014–15 Detroit Waza season was the seventh season of the Detroit Waza professional indoor soccer club, also known as Detroit Waza Flo Pro FC. The Waza, an Eastern Division team in the Major Arena Soccer League, played their home games at the Melvindale Civic Center in the Detroit suburb of Melvindale, Michigan.

The team was led by team owner Mario Scicluna, head coach Costea Decu, and assistant coach Mirco Gubellini. The team struggled to a 4-16 record, placing fourth in the five-team Eastern Division, and did not qualify for post-season play.

== Season summary ==
Detroit opened the season with a home win over the Harrisburg Heat, dropped games to the Rochester Lancers and Baltimore Blast, then defeated Harrisburg on the road. After two more losses, the Waza beat the Syracuse Silver Knights then started an eight-game losing streak, broken only by a third victory over Harrisburg. They closed the season with a roster diminished by trades at the deadline and lost their last four games. With their 4–16 record, Detroit placed fourth in the Eastern Division (ahead of only Harrisburg) and did not qualify for the playoffs.

== History ==
The Waza were a charter member of the Professional Arena Soccer League and the only PASL team to operate continuously from the league's 2008 debut through its 2014 rebranding. The franchise struggled in its first three seasons, posting 7–9, 6–10, and 8–8 records. In 2011–12, the team went 13–3 and won the Eastern Division but lost the Ron Newman Cup Finals. In 2012–13, the Waza improved to 14–2 and again won the Eastern Division only to lose again in the Finals. 2013–14 saw a slip to 10–5, second place in the Eastern Division, and an early exit from the playoffs.

The Waza organization has a long history of community involvement and operates more than 100 youth soccer teams in the Detroit area. The team won the 2012–13 United States Open Cup for Arena Soccer.

== Off-field moves ==
In May 2014, the Professional Arena Soccer League added six teams from the failed third incarnation of the Major Indoor Soccer League and reorganized as the Major Arena Soccer League. The 2014–15 MASL season will be 20 games long, 4 more than the 16 regular season games of recent PASL seasons. With the league expansion and reorganization, the Waza's Eastern division rivals for 2014–15 are the Baltimore Blast, Harrisburg Heat, Rochester Lancers, and Syracuse Silver Knights.

In September 2014, Costea Decu was announced as the team's new head coach. Decu had previously served as co-head coach in the 2012–13 season and, as a player, is a founding member of the Detroit Waza. On October 8, the team announced that retired Italian professional player Mirco Gubellini had signed on as the Waza's assistant coach for the 2014–15 season.

The December 6 game against the Syracuse Silver Knights also features a food drive for the Gleaners Community Food Bank in support of the Downriver communities of Wayne County, Michigan. Fans will receive a discount on admission tickets to the game in exchange for non-perishable food items or cans of food.

== Roster moves ==
The Waza held open tryouts to recruit new players and evaluate returning hopefuls on September 19–20 at High Velocity Sports in Canton Township, Michigan.

On October 10, the Waza announced that team captain Miki Djersilo and veteran forward Worteh Sampson re-signed with the team. On October 20, the team re-signed forwards Nik Djokic and Victor Otieno plus midfielder Michael Grba. In late October, the team signed veteran goalkeeper Vito Lonigro and rookie Matteo Zani who most recently played for AS Roma Futsal of Italy's Serie A league.

In advance of the February 1 league trade deadline, Detroit traded team owner and player Dominic Scicluna to the Las Vegas Legends. Scicluna will also serve as an assistant coach with Las Vegas.

== Schedule ==
Win Loss

=== Regular season ===
Game	Day	Date	Kickoff	Opponent	Results		Location	Attendance
Game	Day	Date	Kickoff	Opponent	Score	Record	Location	Attendance
1	Saturday	November 1	7:05pm	Harrisburg Heat	W 8–4	1–0	Melvindale Civic Center	756
2	Saturday	November 8	7:05pm	Rochester Lancers	L 8–9 (OT)	1–1	Melvindale Civic Center	554
3	Friday	November 14	7:35pm	at Baltimore Blast♠	L 0–26	1–2	Royal Farms Arena	5,516
4	Saturday	November 15	7:05pm	at Harrisburg Heat♠	W 14–6	2–2	Farm Show Large Arena	4,126
5	Saturday	November 22	7:05pm	Milwaukee Wave	L 0–4	2–3	Melvindale Civic Center	549
6	Saturday	November 29	7:00pm	at Rochester Lancers♠	L 5–16	2–4	Blue Cross Arena	5,819
7	Saturday	December 6	7:05pm	Syracuse Silver Knights	W 8–6	3–4	Melvindale Civic Center	534
8	Saturday	December 13	7:35pm	at St. Louis Ambush	L 6–7	3–5	Family Arena	6,486
9	Sunday	December 14	3:05pm	at Chicago Mustangs	L 4–15	3–6	Sears Centre	1,724
10	Saturday	December 20	7:05pm	Chicago Mustangs	L 9–10	3–7	Melvindale Civic Center	547
11	Saturday	December 27	1:05pm	at Milwaukee Wave	L 6–8	3–8	UW–Milwaukee Panther Arena	2,357
12	Saturday	January 10	1:00pm	at Rochester Lancers♠	L 13–25	3–9	Blue Cross Arena	5,689
13	Saturday	January 17	7:05pm	Baltimore Blast	L 6–9	3–10	Melvindale Civic Center	734
14	Saturday	January 24	6:05pm	Milwaukee Wave	L 4–9	3–11	Melvindale Civic Center	641
15	Saturday	January 31	7:05pm	St. Louis Ambush	L 5–6	3–12	Melvindale Civic Center	674
16	Saturday	February 7	7:05pm	Harrisburg Heat	W 13–8	4–12	Melvindale Civic Center	521
17	Saturday	February 14	7:05pm	Chicago Mustangs	L 10–11 (OT)	4–13	Melvindale Civic Center	678
18	Saturday	February 21	6:05pm	at Milwaukee Wave	L 6–12	4–14	UW–Milwaukee Panther Arena	5,138
19	Saturday	February 28	7:05pm	at Harrisburg Heat♠	L 14–20	4–15	Farm Show Large Arena	4,408
20	Sunday	March 1	4:00pm	at Syracuse Silver Knights♠	L 7–17	4–16	Oncenter War Memorial Arena	3,281

♠ Game played with multi-point scoring (most goals worth 2 points and select goals worth 3 points).

== Awards and honors ==
In September 2014, Dominic Scicluna was named an inductee into the Michigan Soccer Association Hall of Fame.

Detroit's Daniel Mattos earned honorable mention for the league's all-rookie team for 2014-15.
