= Louisville Lightning =

- Full name: Louisville Lightning
- Founded: August 15, 2009; 14 years ago
- Dissolved: 2012
- Stadium: Mockingbird Valley Soccer Club
- Capacity: 1,500
- Owner: Louisville Lightning LLC
- League: Professional Arena Soccer League
Home colors	Away colors

Louisville Lightning was an American men's professional soccer club based in Louisville, Kentucky. The Lightning competed in the Professional Arena Soccer League, as a member of the Eastern Division. The club began play in 2009.

They were confirmed as an expansion team in August 2009 and began playing in November of the same year. The Lightning played three full seasons in the PASL before going on hiatus after the 2011–12 season. The club played home games at Mockingbird Valley Soccer Club in Louisville, Kentucky. In early 2020, the team was briefly revived and officially ceased operations in early 2021.

== History ==
In 2009, the PASL was looking to expand following the collapse of the Colorado Lightning after the 2008–09 season. Louisville was awarded the team in August with the ownership group of Wayne Estopinal and Ted Nichols, and the new team was aptly named the Lightning as well. The team joined the Eastern Division of the PASL with the 1790 Cincinnati Express, Detroit Waza, and St. Louis Illusion, moving the Texas Outlaws from the Eastern Division to the Western Division.

Only three months later, the Lightning opened the season at home against the 1790 Cincinnati Express, losing a tight match 6–5. The following week, Louisville notched their first-ever victory against the Detroit Waza 8–3, kicking off what was to be a highly successful inaugural year. The team evened out to 4–4 by mid-January, before throwing together a 5-game winning streak, including crushing the St. Louis Illusion 8–1, Detroit Waza 15–6, and Ohio Vortex 14–8 in consecutive home games. Despite ending the year with two wins against division-leading Cincinnati and Detroit, the Lightning finished one game out of playoff contention at 11–5 to the 12–4 1790 Cincinnati Express.

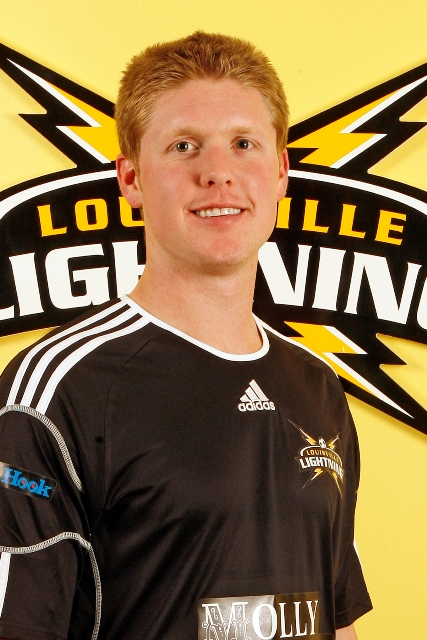
David Horne, player and original general manager for the Lightning

In addition to the regular season, the Lightning made their way through the first two rounds of the US Open Cup, defeating the West Virginia Quantum Force 22–1 and Ohio Vortex 18–4. Close wins over the Detroit Waza 7–6 and 1790 Cincinnati Express 8–5 put the new team in the championship game against the veteran San Diego Sockers to be played in Louisville in April 2010. San Diego started off early and defeated Louisville 11–7, earning their first Open Cup championship in the second year of the tournament.

There was a silver lining in the season for Louisville, as the team received several honors at the end of the year. First-year coach Scott Budnick won Coach of the Year for his accomplishments. F Safet Kovacevic was honored by being named All-League First Team, while D Jonathan Kincheloe was named to the Second Team.

In January 2010, the Lightning signed Louisville native John Michael Hayden, formerly of the MLS Houston Dynamo. John Michael never participated in a match for the main squad but had multiple reserve call-ups. He made his debut against the Ohio Vortex on January 2, scoring two goals in the 11–9 win. He re-signed with the team in September 2010. The deal opened the door for more professional talent to put on the Lightning uniform. Later that year, the team signed Othaniel Yanez and Thabiso Khumalo, becoming the first PASL team to have three former MLS players on its roster at the same time.

The new season also brought changes outside the lines. First-year coach Scott Budnick stepped down, and co-owner Ted Nichols took his spot. The year started off terribly poor, going 1–5 in PASL play with the sole win a 13–7 victory in Tijuana. The newly renamed Cincinnati Kings edged Louisville in the season opener 6–5, followed by another home heartbreaker 6–4 to Detroit. After beating Tijuana, the Lightning faced off with San Diego in a rematch of the US Open Cup final the previous year, except this time in San Diego. The outcome was a familiar one, losing 11–5. After an easy victory in the US Open Cup over the Evansville Crush 25–3, Louisville welcomed San Diego to Louisville again, losing 10–7, followed by a losing trip to Cincinnati 11–9.

Following another easy US Open Cup victory over A.A.F.C. (following that team's impressive upset of the Detroit Waza in the first round) 23–5, Louisville sacked Detroit on the road 10–4, followed by yet another loss to Cincinnati 10–7. Standing at 2–6, Louisville made a comeback. They rolled off four straight victories, three against the Ohio Vortex, and another against Detroit. After two close losses against Detroit and the Illinois Piasa, the Lightning finished strong with a 13–6 drubbing of Ohio, followed by the team's first-ever victory in Cincinnati 9–4, the Kings' first-ever home loss.

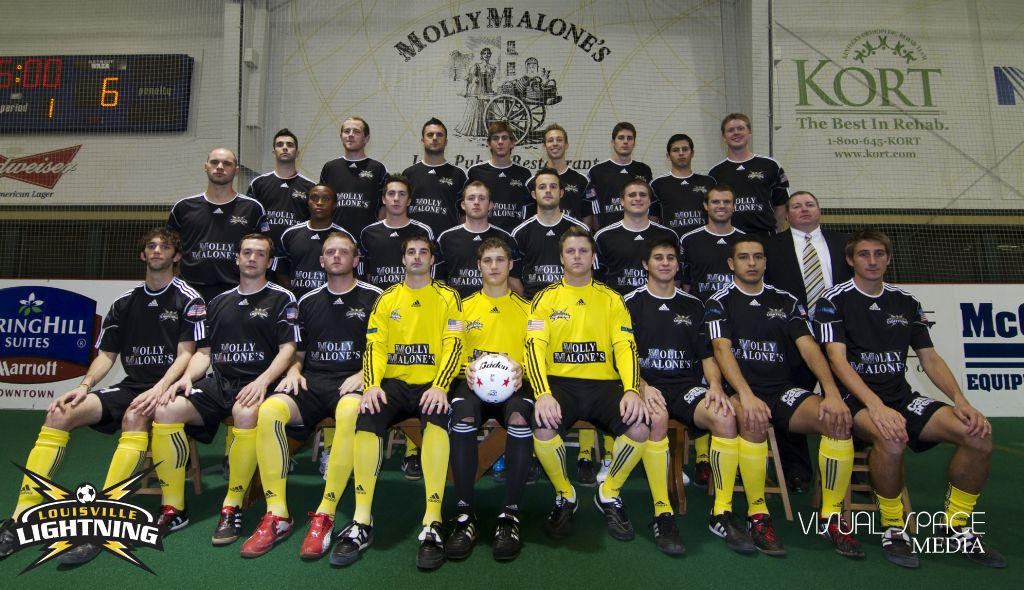
2010–11 Lightning

The victory over Cincinnati also came with some added drama. After the victory over A.A.F.C. in the quarterfinals of the US Open Cup, Louisville and Cincinnati were slated to play in the semifinals. Normally, when two PASL teams match up against each other in the tournament and they have a future game within an acceptable time frame, that game would count as both a PASL regular-season game and the US Open Cup game in order to avoid unnecessary costs. However, Cincinnati claimed to already be selling tickets for a separate game to count as the Cup game. While Louisville was willing to play in a separate game, it pushed strongly for the March 4 matchup to count as both. After deliberation, the PASL decided that Louisville should forfeit the match instead of deciding the outcome on the field. The victory over Cincinnati would have resulted in Louisville facing off with San Diego in the US Open Cup finals for the second straight year, but instead San Diego defeated Cincinnati 13–6.

At the end of their second season, the Lightning finished 10–8 (8–8 PASL), good enough for second place for the second straight year in the Eastern Division, edging out Detroit by goal differential (+23 to -1). The second offseason came with even more changes outside the lines. Player/General Manager David Horne stepped down for a position at the University of Louisville, promoting former VP of Operations Nick Stover to the top spot.

The Lightning announced that the team will not play in the PASL 2012–2013 season on July 19, 2012.

== Club culture ==
=== Thunder Zone ===
The Thunder Zone was created in the inaugural 2009–10 season. Seated directly behind the east goal, these fans are responsible for creating one of the loudest atmospheres in the PASL. Notable members of the Thunder Zone include the Lightning Shock Squad, dressed in yellow and black full body suits, and the masked Dr. Boltenstein.

=== Kids' Zone ===
Thanks to the dual-field setup at Mockingbird Valley Soccer Club, the Lightning home venue, children at the game are able to play on the second field if not watching the game. They can play soccer themselves or on inflatables while being monitored by Lightning and Mockingbird staff. Kids can also become official members of the Louisville Lightning Kids' Club, which allows for autograph sessions for Lightning players, team posters and schedule cards, and the ability to rent out party rooms during games among other features.

== Rivalries ==
=== Cincinnati Kings ===
Though still a young team, the Lightning had created an intense rivalry with the Cincinnati Kings through multiple interdivisional games. Louisville's inaugural game was a loss to Cincinnati (then the 1790 Cincinnati Express) 6–5 at home, which was followed by two more close losses (9–8 and 7–6) in Cincinnati. However, in a game serving as both the US Open Cup semifinals and a PASL regular-season game, Louisville defeated Cincinnati for the first time 8–5 at home, earning the right to meet San Diego in the finals.

The following year, Cincinnati and Louisville would meet another four times with similar results. Cincinnati took the season opener 6–5 yet again in Louisville, before winning at home 11–9 and again in Louisville 10–7. However, the largest margin of victory came in a controversial game to end the 2010–11 season. The two teams were slated to play each other again in the US Open Cup semifinals to face San Diego, but following a miscommunication between the teams the PASL determined that Louisville would forfeit the semifinal matchup, even though the game could have once again served as both the semifinal game and a PASL regular-season game. A fire was lit under the Lightning players, and they left the victor 9–4.

=== San Diego Sockers ===
Despite the distance between the two cities, the Lightning and San Diego Sockers have played several heated matchups, with San Diego the victor in all three games. The first time the teams met was in the final of the 2009–10 US Open Cup, hosted by Louisville. The Sockers scored three quick goals to start off the match and despite an even matchup the rest of the way, won 11–7 to clinch their first Open Cup.

The 2010–11 season pitted the teams against each other twice. On a west coast swing, Louisville visited San Diego one day after defeating Tijuana but were not able to enjoy another victory. San Diego controlled the game from the start, winning 11–5. Two weeks later, San Diego took a trip to the Midwest and found themselves in Louisville once again. While the closest result of the three, the Sockers found themselves on top once again 10–7. Had the aforementioned game in Lightning-Kings game counted as the semifinal match for the 2010–11 US Open Cup, the two teams would have found themselves playing for the third time that year, and the second consecutive year in the Open Cup finals.

== Arena ==
Mockingbird Valley Soccer Club was the home for the original Lightning home games. The facility, located just minutes from downtown Louisville, has a two-field setup, with the Lightning playing its games on the newer Field #2, built with permanent seating around the side. For the 2010–11 season, new permanent seating was added to accommodate the growing popularity of the team. The facility also features a VIP viewing area above the action as well as two party rooms that can be rented out every game.

The official capacity of MVSC for Lightning games was 1,500 fans, but the Lightning has surpassed that mark during a record crowd of 1,547 hosting Cincinnati near the end of the 2009–10 season.

== Year-by-year ==
Year	League	Record	GS	GA	Finish	Playoff	Attendance
2009–10	PASL-Pro	11–5	157	111	2nd Eastern	DNQ	971
2010–11	PASL-Pro	8–8	140	117	2nd Eastern	DNQ	1,026
2011–12	PASL-Pro	11–5	141	113	2nd Eastern	Divisional Playoffs	1,021

== US Open Cup results ==
Year	Round	Final Game	GF	GA	GD
2009–10	Finals	L 11–7 to San Diego Sockers	62	27	+35
2010–11	Semifinals	L 3–0 to Cincinnati Kings	48	11	+37

== Head coaches ==
- (United States) Scott Budnick (2009–2012)
- (United States) Ted Nichols (2010–2012)
- (United States) Mike Dickey (2011–2012)

In the 2011–12 season, Scott Budnick and owner Ted Nichols returned as coaches, with help from newcomer Mike Dickey. Additionally, Ryan Jones was an assistant coach for goalkeepers.

== Historical roster ==
Note: Flags indicate national team as defined under FIFA eligibility rules; some limited exceptions apply. Players may hold more than one non-FIFA nationality.

No.	Pos.	Nation	Player
—	FW	BIH	Aziz Beganovic (2009–2010)
—	FW	ENG	Simon Bird (2009–2012)
—	DF	USA	Adam Boyer (2009–2012)
—	DF	USA	Patrick Bueno (2009–2011)
—	FW	USA	Jerry Chavez (2010–2011)
—	MF	USA	Tommy Clines (2010–2011)
—	FW	USA	Andrew Fitzgerald (2009–2010)
—	FW	MEX	Mariano Gonzalez (2009–2011)
—	MF	USA	Albert Gross (2009–2010)
—	MF	USA	Chad Hagerty (2009–2011)
—	GK	USA	Aaron Harkins (2010–2012)
—	MF	USA	John Michael Hayden (2010–2012)
—	MF	IRL	Ross Hopkins (2010–2012)
—	MF	USA	David Horne (2009–2012)
—	MF	FRA	Tony Jouaux (2009–2011)
—	FW	USA	Nick Judah (2009–2012)
—	GK	USA	Ross Kaufman (2010–2011)

No.	Pos.	Nation	Player
—	FW	RSA	Thabiso Khumalo (2010–2011)
—	DF	USA	Jonathan Kincheloe (2009–2011)
—	MF	BIH	Safet Kovacevic (2009–2011)
—	GK	USA	Trey Kramer (2010–2011)
—	FW	USA	Kolby LaCrone (2010–2011)
—	DF	USA	Ryan McDonald (2009–2012)
—	MF	USA	Gabriel Mercier (2009–2010)
—	GK	USA	Frank Peabody (2009–2012)
—	FW	USA	Lindsay Smith (2009–2011)
—	DF	USA	Nick Staggs (2009–2011)
—	FW	USA	Scott Stockum (2010–2012)
—	DF	USA	Glenn Volk (2009–2010)
—	DF	USA	Lee Weyland (2009–2012)
—	DF	USA	Grant Wheeler (2010–2011)
—	MF	USA	Ryan Wood (2009–2010)
—	MF	USA	Othaniel Yanez (2010–2012)
—	MF	USA	Darren Yeagle (2009–2012)
—	GK	USA	Keith O'Loane (2012)

== Player career records ==
=== Appearances ===
As of February 24, 2024

#	Name	Career	PASL	Playoffs	Total
1	(United States) Frank Peabody	2009–2012	41	1	42
2	(United States) Lee Weyland	2009–2012	40	1	41
3	(United States) Adam Boyer	2009–2012	39	1	40
4	(United States) Nick Judah	2009–2012	39	1	40
5	(United States) John Michael Hayden	2009–2012	37	1	38

=== Goals ===
As of February 24, 2024

#	Name	Career	PASL	Playoffs	Total
1	(United States) Adam Boyer	2009–2012	36	2	38
2	(United States) Nick Judah	2009–2012	30	0	30
3	(Bosnia and Herzegovina) Safet Kovacevic	2009–2011	30	0	30
4	(United States) Nick Judah	2009–2012	39	1	40
5	(United States) Darren Yeagle	2010–2012	28	0	28

=== Assists ===
As of February 24, 2024

#	Name	Career	PASL	Playoffs	Total
1	(United States) John Michael Hayden	2009–2012	33	0	33
2	(Bosnia and Herzegovina) Safet Kovacevic	2009–2011	28	0	28
3	(United States) Adam Boyer	2009–2012	28	0	28
4	(United States) Chad Hagerty	2009–2011	18	0	18
5	(United States) Glenn Volk	2009–2010	17	0	17

== Affiliated clubs ==
=== Louisville Lightning Reserves ===
The Louisville Lightning Reserves were created in fall 2010 in order to begin play in the Premier Arena Soccer League (PASL-Premier), the official developmental league for the Professional Arena Soccer League (PASL-Pro). The team joined the Midwest Division, joining the Cincinnati Saints, Cincinnati Kings Reserves, Piasa FC, FC Indiana, Paducah Wildcats, and Evansville Crush.

The Lightning Reserves had a rough start to their inaugural 2010–11 season, going 1–5 with their sole victory against the winless Paducah Wildcats. However, they finished the season with two home victories against FC Indiana and Paducah to end the season 3–5, just behind Piasa FC at 3–4–1.

The Reserves hit a high note during qualifying for the 2010–11 US Open Cup. Victories against the independent Rochester Rhinos (2–1) and UFC Eagles (5–1), followed by a close loss to the Evansville Crush (4–3), putting the team at 2–1 and tied with Rochester in total points. However, the Lightning was one better in goal differential and advanced to the final for a rematch against Evansville. At the end of regulation, the match was tied 6–6, but Evansville prevailed in overtime 7–6 to earn a matchup against the Louisville Lightning PASL-Pro team. In that game, the Lightning put an end to Evansville's run 25–3.

=== Juventus Lightning ===
The Juventus Lightning was created in spring 2011 as a partnership between the Louisville Lightning, Juventus Louisville Soccer, and America in order to expand opportunities for the multicultural community of Louisville to participate in and develop the highest level of amateur soccer in Kentucky. Previously, four members of the Lightning roster had been featured on the Juventus team: Jerry Chavez, Mariano Gonzalez, Safet Kovacevic, and Aziz Beganovic. Several members of the Louisville Lightning Reserves were featured for the team, which participates in the Louisville Latino Soccer League.

The newly partnered team began with a bang, winning the Greater Louisville Soccer League's Men's Open Division in May 2011, with Beganovic earning the title of tournament MVP. Soon afterwards, the Juventus Lightning took part in the Jasmin Batanovic Memorial 6v6 Soccer Tournament, and fought off teams from around the region and as far away as Chicago to earn its second title in two tries. Success also came in the Louisville Latino Soccer League, opening their season with an undefeated 9–0–1 mark, good enough for first place.

== See also ==
- Sports in Louisville, Kentucky
