= 2011–12 United States Open Cup for Arena Soccer =

US Open Arena Soccer Championship
- Season: 2011-12
- Champions: San Diego Sockers
- Highest scoring: 22 - Anaheim Bolts 15, Docemas 7; Round of 16
- Longest unbeaten run: 5 - San Diego Sockers

The 2011-12 US Open Cup for Arena Soccer is the fourth edition of an open knockout style tournament for Arena/Indoor Soccer. Currently teams from the Professional Arena Soccer League, Premier Arena Soccer League, and other independent indoor soccer teams participate in the tournament.

== US Open Arena Soccer Championship bracket ==
Wild Card Round; December 2011
PASL	(Ohio) Cincinnati Kings	8
PASLP	(Ohio) Cincinnati Saints	4
PASL	(Kentucky) Louisville Lightning	15
PASLP	(Indiana) Indy Elite FC	5
PASL	(California) San Diego Sockers	9
Ind	(Nevada) Las Vegas Select	4

Round of 16; November 2011-January 2012
PASL	(Michigan) Detroit Waza	12
Ind.	(Michigan) World Latino Lg. All-Stars	2
PASL	(Ohio) Cincinnati Kings	9
PASL	(Kentucky) Louisville Lightning	3
PASLP	(Missouri) Springfield Demize	5
PASLP	(Texas) Vitesse Dallas	7
PASLP	(Colorado) Denver Dynamite	3
PASLP	Colorado Blizzard (Forfeit)	0
PASL	(California) Turlock Express	8
PASLP	(Nevada) Las Vegas Knights	7
PASL	(California) Anaheim Bolts	15
Ind.	(California) Docemas	7
PASL	(Washington (state)) Tacoma Stars	-
Bye	-
PASL	(California) San Diego Sockers	10
PASL	Arizona Storm	3

Quarterfinals; December 2011-January 2012
PASL	(Michigan) Detroit Waza	6
PASL	(Ohio) Cincinnati Kings	7
PASLP	(Texas) Vitesse Dallas	11
PASLP	(Colorado) Denver Dynamite	6
PASL	(California) Turlock Express	9
PASL	(California) Anaheim Bolts	8
PASL	(Washington (state)) Tacoma Stars	6
PASL	(California) San Diego Sockers	13

Semifinals; January–February 2012
PASL	(Ohio) Cincinnati Kings	10
PASLP	(Texas) Vitesse Dallas	5
PASL	(California) Turlock Express	8
PASL	(California) San Diego Sockers	10

Final; March 17, 2012
PASL	(Ohio) Cincinnati Kings	6
PASL	(California) San Diego Sockers	13

^Estimated Dates

== Confirmed dates and matchups ==
All times local

=== Wild Card round ===
- Fri.Dec.9, 7:30pm - Louisville Lightning (PASL) 15, Indy Elite FC (PASL-Premier) 5
- Sat.Dec.10, 9:15pm - Cincinnati Kings (PASL) 8, Cincinnati Saints (PASL-Premier) 4
- Tue.Dec.27, 7:05pm - San Diego Sockers (PASL) 9, Las Vegas Select (Independent) 4

=== Round of 16 ===
- Sat.Nov.12, 4:05pm - Turlock Express (PASL) 8, Las Vegas Knights (PASL-Premier) 7
- Sat.Dec.3, 7:35pm - Detroit Waza (PASL) 12, World Latino League All-Stars (Independent) 2
- Sat.Dec.3, 8:00pm - Anaheim Bolts (PASL) 15, Docemas (Independent) 7
- Fri.Dec.30, 8:05pm - Cincinnati Kings (PASL) 9, Louisville Lightning (PASL) 3 (Doubles as regular season match)
- Fri.Jan.6th, 7:30pm - Denver Dynamite (PASL-Premier) 3, Colorado Blizzard (PASL-Premier) 0 (Forfeit- Regular Season Match Rescheduled)
- Sun.Jan.8, 12:00pm - San Diego Sockers (PASL) 10, Arizona Storm (PASL) 3 (Doubles as regular season match)
- Sun.Jan.8, 8:00pm - Vitesse Dallas (PASL-Premier) 7, Springfield Demize (PASL-Premier) 5

=== Quarterfinals ===
- Fri.Dec.16, 7:35pm - Turlock Express (PASL) 9, Anaheim Bolts (PASL) 8 (Doubles as regular season match)
- Sat.Jan.14, 7:00pm - San Diego Sockers (PASL) 13, Tacoma Stars (PASL) 6 (Doubles as regular season match)
- Sat.Jan.21, 8:00pm - Vitesse Dallas (PASL-Premier) 11, Denver Dynamite (PASL-Premier) 6
- Sat.Jan.28, 7:35pm - Cincinnati Kings (PASL) 7, Detroit Waza (PASL) 6 (Doubles as regular season match)

=== Semifinals ===
- Sat.Jan.21, 7:05pm - San Diego Sockers (PASL) 10, Turlock Express (PASL) 8 (Doubles as regular season match)
- Fri.Feb.17, 9:00pm - Cincinnati Kings (PASL) 10, Vitesse Dallas (PASL-Premier) 5

=== Finals ===
- Sat.Mar.17, 7:35pm - San Diego Sockers (PASL) 13, Cincinnati Kings (PASL) 6

== Qualifying ==
- Green indicates qualification for Qualifying Tournament Knockout Round(s)
- Bold Indicates Qualifying Tournament Winner and qualification to US Arena Open Cup
- All times local

Place	Team	GP	W/L	Pct	GF	GA
Cincinnati Qualifying - Group Standings (@ Cincinnati, OH)
1	Cincinnati Saints (PASL-Premier)	2	1-1	.500	8	5
2	Cincinnati Kings Reserves Two (PASL-Premier)	2	1-1	.500	7	8
3	Cincinnati Kings Reserves One (PASL-Premier)	2	1-1	.500	6	8

Group Matches
Sat. Oct. 15, 2011

- Cincinnati Saints 5, Cincinnati Kings Reserves One 1
- Cincinnati Kings Reserves One 5, Cincinnati Kings Reserves Two 3
- Cincinnati Kings Reserves Two 4, Cincinnati Saints 3

Cincinnati Saints qualify for US Arena Open Cup Wild Card Round

Place	Team	GP	W/L	Pct	GF	GA
Hoosier Cup(Evansville Qualifying) - Group A Standings (@ Evansville, IN)
1	Cincinnati Kings Reserves One (PASL-Premier)$	2	2-0	1.000	9	3
2	Louisville Rayo (PASL-Premier)	3	2-1	.666	25	2
3	Los Bravos (Independent)	3	1-2	.333	8	11
4	Metro FC (Independent)	3	0-3	.000	1	44
Hoosier Cup(Evansville Qualifying) - Group B Standings (@ Evansville, IN)
1	Evansville Crush (PASL-Premier)	3	2-0-1	.833	33	1
2	Indy Elite FC (PASL-Premier)	3	2-0-1	.833	12	6
3	Cincinnati Kings Reserves Two (PASL-Premier)$	2	1-1	.500	10	6
4	Beatdown City Blazers (Independent)	3	0-3	.000	4	29

Group Matches
Sat. Oct. 22, 2011

- 9:00am - Los Bravos 6, Metro FC 1
- 10:00am - Evansville Crush 15, Beatdown City Blazers 0
- 11:00am - Louisville Rayo 21, Metro FC 0
- 2:00pm - Cincinnati Kings Reserves One 7, Los Bravos 2
- 3:00pm - Evansville Crush 1, Indy Elite FC 1
- 4:00pm - Cincinnati Kings Reserves Two 8, Beatdown City Blazers 1
- 5:00pm - Cincinnati Kings Reserves One 2, Louisville Rayo 1
- 6:00pm - Indy Elite FC 5, Cincinnati Kings Reserves Two 2

Group Matches
Sun. Oct. 23, 2011

- 8:00am - Louisville Rayo 3, Los Bravos 0
- 9:00am - Evansville Crush 17, Metro FC 0
- 10:00am - Indy Elite FC 6, Beatdown City Blazers 3

Semifinals
Sun. Oct. 23, 2011

- 1:00pm - Indy Elite FC 4, Louisville Rayo 2
- 2:00pm - Evansville Crush 7, Los Bravos 0

Finals
Sun. Oct. 23, 2011

- 4:00pm - Indy Elite FC 1, Evansville Crush 1 (Indy Elite FC Wins Shootout, 2-0)

Indy Elite FC qualify for US Arena Open Cup Wild Card Round

$ - Teams could not play Sunday, making them ineligible for the Semifinals and Finals

Place	Team	GP	W/L	Pct	GF	GA
Anaheim Qualifying - Group A Standings (@ Orange, CA)
1	Anaheim Bolts Reserves Blue(PASL-Premier)	2	1-0-1	.750	15	8
2	Freekick (Independent)	2	1-0-1	.750	7	4
3	Bench Warmers (Independent)	2	0-2	.000	4	14
Anaheim Qualifying - Group B Standings (@ Orange, CA)
1	Docemas (Independent)	2	1-0-1	.750	14	6
2	Anaheim Bolts Reserves White(PASL-Premier)	2	1-0-1	.750	11	9
3	Deft Touch (PASL-Premier)	2	0-2	.000	5	15

Group Matches
Sat. Nov. 26, 2011

- 9:00am - Freekick 4, Anaheim Bolts Reserves Blue 4
- 10:00am - Anaheim Bolts Reserves White 6, Deft Touch 4
- 11:00am - Freekick 3, Bench Warmers 0
- 12:00pm - Docemas 9, Deft Touch 1
- 1:00pm - Anaheim Bolts Reserves Blue 11, Bench Warmers 4
- 2:00pm - Anaheim Bolts Reserves White 5, Docemas 5

Wild Card Round
Sun. Nov. 27, 2011

- 10:00am - Anaheim Bolts Reserves Blue 6, Deft Touch 3
- 11:00am - Anaheim Bolts Reserves White 3, Bench Warmers 0

Semifinals
Sun. Nov. 27, 2011

- 12:00pm - Docemas 7, Anaheim Bolts Reserves Blue 2
- 1:00pm - Freekick 6, Anaheim Bolts Reserves White 1

Finals
Sun. Nov. 27, 2011

- 2:15pm - Docemas 4, Freekick 3

Docemas qualify for US Arena Open Cup Round of 16

== See also ==
- 2012 FIFRA Club Championship
