= Roby Monroe =

American soccer player

Robert "Roby" Monroe is an American soccer player, who formerly played for the Denver Dynamite in the Professional Arena Soccer League.
