= United States Open Cup for Arena Soccer =

Cup-style tournament

US Arena Open Cup
- Sport: Indoor soccer
- Founded: 2008
- Most recent champion: Metro Louisville FC (2021-22)
- Most titles: San Diego Sockers (3)
- Related competitions: MASL, PASL
- Website: U.S. Open Championship

The United States Open for Arena Soccer is a cup-style tournament for all Major Arena Soccer League, MASL2, MASL3 and Premier Arena Soccer League teams. Established in 2008, the PASL announced they would hold the first tournament for indoor soccer open to all leagues and/or existing teams.

== Champions ==
Season	Champion	Score	Runner-up
2008–09	St. Louis Illusion	8–3	Detroit Waza
2009–10	San Diego Sockers	11–7	Louisville Lightning
2010–11	San Diego Sockers	13–6	Cincinnati Kings
2011–12	San Diego Sockers	13–6	Cincinnati Kings
2012–13	Detroit Waza	7–6	San Diego Sockers
2013–14	Chicago Mustangs	14–5 ^{†}	Hidalgo La Fiera
2014–15	none (no tournament due to inaugural WMF World Cup)	--	--
2021–22	Metro Louisville FC	4–0	State Line Falcons

^{†} Also PASL Ron Newman Cup Championship
