= Kansas Magic =

- Founded: 2011
- Dissolved: 2012
- Ground: EPIC Indoor Sports Center; Overland Park, Kansas
- Capacity: 800
- Owner: BJ Latas
- Coach: Randall Porter
- League: Professional Arena Soccer League
- Website: http://www.ksmagicprosoccer.com
Home colors	Away colors

Kansas Magic was a professional indoor soccer team based in Overland Park, Kansas. They played in the Eastern Division of the Professional Arena Soccer League. The team colors were purple, white and black.

== History ==
The Kansas Magic was awarded a franchise in the PASL on February 10, 2011. Their first game was an exhibition at Landon Arena on April 30, defeating the Illinois Piasa 7-3. They beat the Piasa 11-9 in Illinois in the PASL season opener on November 5 and 4-3 in their first home game at EPIC Indoor Sports on November 12.

They finished the 2011–12 season with a record of 8 wins and 8 losses and qualified for the playoffs. Matt Germain lead the team in scoring (17 goals, 8 assists) and goalkeeper Jason Jacob was fourth in the league with a 6.77 goals against average. The Magic defeated the Louisville Lightning in the Divisional Playoffs 9-5 in Louisville. They lost to the eventual PASL Champion San Diego Sockers 9-5 in the Newman Cup Semi-Finals in San Diego.

The team disbanded after the season.

== Year-by-year ==
Season	League	Won	Lost	GF	GA	Regular season	Playoffs	Avg. attendance
2011–12	PASL	8	8	109	116	3rd, Eastern	Semi-Finals	269
