= Darren Warren =

American singer-songwriter

- Born: Mayfield, Kentucky, United States
- Genres: Country
- Occupation: Singer-songwriter
- Instruments: Singing, guitar

Darren Warren is an American country music singer and songwriter from Mayfield, Kentucky, United States.

== Personal life ==
Warren was 16 years old when he was diagnosed with non-Hodgkin lymphoma. The doctor's prognosis was dire, Warren was given less than a 50-percent chance of survival. He spent the next three years at St. Jude Children's Research Hospital in Memphis, Tennessee seeking treatment. Warren began treatment at St. Jude on January 5, 1999. Over an almost three-year period, he endured over 120 rounds of chemotherapy. In 2001, Warren was diagnosed as cancer free.

"There are things that come at you that are stumbling blocks.," Warren said. "If we can take them and make them stepping stones, we can help more people and do things to change people's lives." In August 2011, Darren Warren celebrated a milestone: 10 years in remission from non-Hodgkin Lymphoma. "Going back to St. Jude with my guitar to meet the patients and sing songs like "Old McDonald Had a Farm" might sound small to a lot of people, but to me, that's what it's all about."

== Music career ==
After overcoming cancer, Warren set his sights on another challenge: conquering the airwaves of country music as a performing songwriter. So far, he has shared the stage with Vince Gill, Travis Tritt, and Emerson Drive, among others. Warren has also journeyed across the country sharing his story and his music. He is an active participant in St. Jude's Country Cares for Kids, a radiothon founded by Alabama band member, Randy Owen. The cross-country tour is focused on raising awareness and support for the research medical center.

Darren Warren's CD "Cowboy Up and Party Down" was recorded in Nashville, Tennessee and produced by industry veteran Doug Grau. Grau is credited with producing The Statler Brothers, as well as stand-up acts Jeff Foxworthy and Bill Engvall. The title track "Cowboy Up and Party Down" (written by Eddie Kilgallon) was released as his first single and distributed to country music radio stations in May 2011. A poignant song Warren wrote for the album, "Go Get My Angel," deals with the loss of a young victim to cancer. Randy Owen of the Country Music Hall of Fame band Alabama is featured as a guest artist on the song. It is a fan favorite that has provided inspiration to many families struggling with grief.

Darren Warren now regards the diagnosis he received as a teenager a blessing in disguise. Warren's life-threatening experience was a life-changing catalyst that propelled him into the future pursuing his dream as a country music artist. Warren never lacked inspiration during his time in the hospital. It was during treatment that he wrote almost every song that would be recorded on his debut CD. "There were times when I sat down and told my guitar how I felt, and I realized I had created a song," Warren remembers.

Warren has said that the sole motivation for his music career is simple: he wants to offer hope and encouragement to young boys and girls faced with a terminal illness.
