= Thabiso Khumalo =

South African soccer player

Personal information
- Full name: Thabiso Khumalo
- Date of birth: 27 October 1980 (age 46)
- Place of birth: Soweto, South Africa
- Height: 5 ft 10 in (1.78 m)
- Positions: Right midfielder; forward

Youth career
- –1997: Transnet School of Excellence
- 1997–????: Nelson County Assassins
- ????–????: Javanon
- ????–2001: Lexington Premier

College career
Years	Team	Apps	(Gls)
2001–2002	Lindsey Wilson Blue Raiders		
2003–2004	Coastal Carolina Chanticleers		

Senior career*
Years	Team	Apps	(Gls)
2001–2003	Mid-Michigan Bucks		
2003–2004	Chicago Fire Premier	12	(8)
2005	Chicago Fire	0	(0)
2005	Charleston Battery	18	(0)
2006	Wilmington Hammerheads	20	(1)
2007–2008	Alexandra United	20	(8)
2008	Pittsburgh Riverhounds	20	(6)
2008	→ D.C. United (loan)	7	(1)
2009–2010	D.C. United	20	(0)
2010–2011	Louisville Lightning (indoor)	1	(0)
2011–2013	Pittsburgh Riverhounds	10	(0)
2013–2015	Lansing United	8	(0)
2016–2017	AFC Ann Arbor		

Managerial career
- 2019–: AFC Ann Arbor (women)
- * Club domestic league appearances and goals as of 4 June 2011

Thabiso "Boyzzz" Khumalo (born 27 October 1980 in Soweto) is a South African former soccer player. Since 2019, he has been head coach of AFC Ann Arbor's women's side in the USL W League.

== Early life and education ==
As a boy, Khumalo played under Farouk Khan at the "Super Centre" at the Transnet School of Excellence, before moving to the United States at the age of 16, settling in Kentucky. Khumalo attended Bethlehem High School in Bardstown, Kentucky, played club soccer for the Nelson County Assassins, Javanon and Lexington Premier, and played college soccer for Lindsey Wilson College and Coastal Carolina University while studying for a Bachelor of Science degree in Physical Education. During his college years Khumalo also played in the USL Premier Development League for both Mid-Michigan Bucks and Chicago Fire Premier.

=== Professional career ===
Khumalo was drafted by Chicago Fire in the 2005 MLS SuperDraft, but never played a game in MLS, and instead spent time with Charleston Battery in the USL First Division. He joined USL Second Division side Wilmington Hammerheads in 2006, and then returned to South Africa, where he played for the Vodacom League team Alexandra United for his former coach, Farouk Khan.

Khumalo returned to the United States in 2008, playing for the Pittsburgh Riverhounds in the USL Second Division, where he was named to the USL-2 Team of the Year, played all 20 games, and registered six goals and three assists to finish tied for sixth in points in the league. He was also named in the Team of the Week on four occasions, and named Player of the Week once.

On 10 September 2008, Khumalo signed on loan with D.C. United. He bagged his first goal for D.C. United during a 5–2 loss to Los Angeles Galaxy on 21 September 2008. Khumalo's success on loan led to United signing him on a permanent basis after the 2008 season ended. Khumalo was released by D.C. United on 27 July 2010.

In November 2010, the Louisville Lightning from the Premier Arena Soccer League announced they had signed Khumalo to play in the 2010–11 season.

On 14 March 2011, Khumalo signed a contract with Pittsburgh Riverhounds, now playing in the USL Pro league.

On 16 November 2013, Khumalo signed with Lansing United, of the National Premier Soccer League.

Khumalo signed with AFC Ann Arbor of the National Premier Soccer League for the 2016 season as an assistant coach and player.

== Personal life ==
Khumalo is involved with a nonprofit organisation called the Umhlaba Vision Foundation, which serves to find opportunities for youth through sport and education.
