= Denver Dynamite (soccer) =

American soccer team

- Full name: Denver Dynamite
- Nicknames: The Dynamite, TeamTNT
- Founded: 2008
- Dissolved: 2015
- Ground: Parker Fieldhouse
- Capacity: 500 with standing room
- Operations Director: Javier Larios
- Head Coach: Tony Avery
- League: Premier Arena Soccer League
- 2014-2015: 4th place, Rocky Mountain Division; Playoffs: DNQ
Home colors	Away colors

The Denver Dynamite were an American Arena soccer team based in Denver, Colorado. They were founded in 2008 and they folded in 2015.

The team was a charter member of the Professional Arena Soccer League (PASL-Pro), the first division of arena (indoor) soccer in North America before going on hiatus for 2010-11 and returning to the Premier Arena Soccer League (PASL-Premier) for the Winter 2011-12 season (initially as the Rocky Mountain Rattlers before reverting to their original name). The team's colors were red, gold and blue.

== Roster ==
As of January 21, 2012 Note: Flags indicate national team as defined under FIFA eligibility rules; some limited exceptions apply. Players may hold more than one non-FIFA nationality.

No.	Pos.	Nation	Player
—	FW	USA	Tony Avery
—	MF	USA	Greg Borchers
—	GK	USA	Clint Baumstark
—	GK	USA	Brandyn Bumpus
—	FW	USA	Travis Carey
—	DF	PER	Jonathan Cordero
—	MF	USA	Brandon Devores
—	FW	USA	Doug Evans
—	MF	USA	CJ Francis
—	MF	USA	Marc Francis
—	MF	USA	Justin Ferguson
—	DF	USA	Pedroo Garibo
—	GK	USA	Bart Jones
—	GK	USA	Derek Haddix
—	FW	USA	Jay Hamilton ŧ
—	GK	USA	Jordan Howes

No.	Pos.	Nation	Player
—	MF	USA	Taylor Kendal
—	DF	USA	Dave Kroenig
—	DF	USA	Dan Millard
—	FW	USA	Roby Monroe
—	DF	USA	Brandon Morales
—	DF	USA	Michael Ogletree
—	DF	USA	Chad Pearson
—	FW	MEX	Poncho Puente
—	MF	USA	Julian Rizo
—	DF	USA	Brandon Sejera
—	DF	USA	Sean Stedeford
—	MF	USA	Brett Thomas
—	FW	USA	Tony Thomas ŧ
—	FW	USA	James Woodard
—	FW	USA	Edward Yepes
—	MF	USA	Fernando Yepes

== Notable former players ==
- (Canada) Chris Handsor (2008-2010)
- (United States) Garth Archibald ŧ (2008-2009)
- (United States) Justin Dzuba ŧ (2008-2010)
- (United States) Ryan Creager ŧ (2008-2009)
- (United States) Tony Thomas ŧ (2008-2009)

ŧ – US National Arena Soccer Team Member

== Year-by-year ==
Year	Win	Loss	Tie	GF	GA	GD	League	Division	Reg. season	Playoffs	Avg. attendance
2008-2009	9	7		133	126	7	PASL-Pro	Western	2nd place	Quarterfinal	305
2009-2010	2	14		66	108	-42	PASL-Pro	Western	4th place	DNQ	486
2010-2011	—	—	—	—	—	—	—	—	—	—	—
2011-2012	3	4	1	40	43	-3	PASL-Premier	Rocky Mountain	2nd place	Divisional	276
2012-2013	3	4	1	40	58	-18	PASL-Premier	Rocky Mountain	3rd place	DNQ	329
2013-2014	4	4	0	56	60	-4	PASL-Premier	Rocky Mountain	3rd place	DNQ	106
Totals	21	33	2	335	395	-56				0-2	300

== United States Open Cup for Arena Soccer ==
Year	Win	Loss	GF	GA	GD	Round
2008–09	2	1	16	22	-6	Quarterfinals
2009–10	1	1	10	19	-9	Quarterfinals
2010–11	—	—	—	—	—	Did not enter
2011–12	1	1	9	11	-2	Quarterfinals
2012–13	0	1	7	12	-5	Wild Card
2013–14	0	1	6	15	-9	Round of 32
Totals	4	5	48	79	-31	3, Quarterfinal Appearances

== Copa America ==
Year	Win	Loss	Points	GF	GA	GD	Group	Place	Playoffs
2008-2009	4	2	12	50	56	-6	West	1st	None
Totals	4	2	12	50	56	-6	West	1st	None

== Playoff record ==
Year	Win	Loss	GF	GA	GD	Round
2008-2009	0	1	9	10	-1	Quarterfinals
2011-2012	0	1	3	7	-4	Divisional ±
Total	0	2	12	17	-5	

± Final regular season game doubled as divisional playoff.

== Honors ==
Championships

- None

Division titles

- None

== Coaching staff ==
=== Head coaches ===
- (United States) Mike Thompson (2008)
- (United States) John Wells (2009)
- (Canada) Chris Handsor (2008-2009, 2010)
- (United States) Chuck Estrada (2009, 2010–2013)
- (United States) Jay Hamilton (2012–2014)
- (United States) Tony Avery (2011-2012, 2014–Present)

=== Assistant coaches ===
- (United States) Chuck Estrada (2008, 2009-2010)
- (United States) Jeremy Gibe (2009)
- (United States) Mark Perdew (2009-2010)
- (United States) Tony Thomas (2012–2014)

=== Technical director / goalkeeper coach ===
- (United States) Chuck Estrada (2009–2014)

== Arenas ==
- Denver Sports Center (2008)
- Denver Bladium (2009)
- Westridge Recreation Center (2010-2011)
- Apex Field House (2012–2014)
- Parker Fieldhouse (2009, 2014–2015)
