= Texas Outlaws =

- Full name: Texas Outlaws
- Nickname: The Outlaws
- Founded: 2008
- Dissolved: 2010
- Ground: TCG Arena
- Capacity: 1,000
- General Manager: Marco Juarez
- Head Coach: Kevin Leonard
- League: Professional Arena Soccer League
- 2008-09: 2nd East (8-8)
Home colors	Away colors

The Texas Outlaws were an American indoor soccer team founded in 2008. The team was a charter member of the Professional Arena Soccer League (PASL-Pro), the first division of arena (indoor) soccer in North America. The team disbanded in 2010.

== Year-by-year ==
Year	Win	Loss	League	Division	Reg. season	Playoffs	Avg. attendance
2009–10	9	7	PASL-Pro	Western	3rd West	Did not qualify	175
2008–09	8	8	PASL-Pro	Eastern	2nd East	Did not qualify	358
Totals	17	15					

== Arenas ==
- NYTEX Sports Centre 2008-2009
- Arena Athletics 2009
- TCG Arena 2009–2010

== Schedules/Results ==
2009-2010 Season
Date	Opponent	Location	Win/Loss	Score
24 October 2009	Blue/White Intrasquad	Home	White	6-4
31 October 2009	DFW Tornadoes (pre-season)	Away	L	2-8
1 November 2009	Tyler Threat (pre-season)	Home	W	12-3
15 November 2009	San Diego Sockers	Home	L	5-7
21 November 2009	Denver Dynamite	Away	W	12-6
6 December 2009	St. Louis Illusion	Home	W	9-3
11 December 2009	St. Louis Illusion	Away	L	10-11
12 December 2009	Kansas City Kings	Away	W	7-5
19 December 2009	Springfield Demize (MO)	Home	W	16-4
20 December 2009	US Open Qualifier (Vitesse Dallas)	Home	L	2-11
3 January 2010	Exhibition (Nino Soccer Club)	Home	W	10-3
10 January 2010	California Cougars	Home	L	5-8
16 January 2010	San Diego Sockers	Away	L	7-14
17 January 2010	California Cougars	Away	L	5-13
23 January 2010	Edmonton Drillers	Away	L	3-17
24 January 2010	Calgary United	Away	L	1-14
30 January 2010	Denver Dynamite	Home	W	15-9
21 February 2010	St. Louis Illusion	Home	W	forfeit
26 February 2010	Denver Dynamite	Home	W	forfeit
6 February 2010	Alamo City Warriors	Home	W	21-3
27 February 2010	Nino SC (replaced Denver Dynamite)	Home	W	13-5

2008-2009 Season
Date	Opponent	Location	Win/Loss	Score
2 November 2008	Colorado Lightning	Away	W	8-5
15 November 2008	St. Louis Illusion	Away	L	6-13
16 November 2008	Denver Dynamite	Home	L	4-8
29 November 2008	Calgary United	Home	W	6-5
5 December 2008	Stockton Cougars	Away	W	10-9 (OT)
6 December 2008	Wenatchie Fire	Away	W	12-3
13 December 2008	St. Louis Illusion	Home	W	8-6
4 January 2009	Monterrey La Raza	Away	L	7-15
10 January 2009	Monterrey La Raza	Home	L	5-9
24 January 2009	Stockton Cougars	Home	L	4-16
7 February 2009	St. Louis Illusion	Away	W	9-8
8 February 2009	St. Louis Illusion	Away	L	6-15
28 February 2009	Tyler Threat FC	Home	W	15-13
6 March 2009	Edmonton Drillers	Away	L	10-13
7 March 2009	Calgary United	Away	W	8-7
8 March 2009	Alamo SC	Home	cc'd	n/a
