= Jeff Hughes (soccer) =

American soccer player

Personal information
- Full name: Jeffrey Hughes
- Date of birth: August 20, 1984 (age 42)
- Place of birth: Covington, Kentucky, United States
- Height: 6 ft 1 in (1.85 m)
- Position: Forward

College career
Years	Team	Apps	(Gls)
2001–2002	Western Michigan Broncos		
2003	Cincinnati Bearcats		

Senior career*
Years	Team	Apps	(Gls)
2004	TSV 1860 München	0	(0)
2005–2006	Cincinnati Kings	32	(5)
2006–2007	Wilmington Hammerheads	23	(0)
2008–2009	Pittsburgh Riverhounds	29	(2)
2008–2009	1790 Cincinnati (indoor)	13	(17)
2010–2011	Cincinnati Kings	13	(0)
2011–2012	Syracuse Silver Knights (indoor)	24	(21)
2012–2013	Cincinnati Kings (indoor)	12	(22)
2013	Missouri Comets (indoor)	14	(7)
2013–2017	San Diego Sockers (indoor)	58	(31)
2018–2022	Ontario Fury (indoor)	28	(9)

International career
- United States arena soccer

Managerial career
- 2012–2013: Cincinnati Kings
- * Club domestic league appearances and goals as of 22 May 2020

Jeff Hughes (born August 20, 1984, in Covington, Kentucky) is an American former professional soccer player who is currently the head academy coach for City SC in Carlsbad, California.

== Career ==
=== Youth and college ===
Growing up in Northern Kentucky, Hughes set several area records for goals scored while playing at Holmes High School. During his senior season, he set the Region record for goals scored in a season and was voted 2001 Northern Kentucky Player of the Year. After high school Hughes chose to play soccer for NCAA Division I Western Michigan University, and then later transferred to the University of Cincinnati at the end of his sophomore year.

=== Professional ===
Hughes left the college ranks after just one season with the UC Bearcats, forfeiting his remaining NCAA eligibility to play professionally. Originally he signed with the Second Bundesliga club TSV 1860 München, but soon after, he returned to the US and found a home with the USL Second Division team Cincinnati Kings. During the 2006 season, the Kings traded Hughes to the North Carolina–based Wilmington Hammerheads. After just over a year with Wilmington, he left to join the Pittsburgh Riverhounds for the 2008 season.

After the close of the 2008 season, he signed with 1790 Cincinnati in the Professional Arena Soccer League, where he was named 2nd team PASL. He returned to the Riverhounds for 2009, but was released from his contract at the end of the season.

Having been unable to secure a professional contract elsewhere, Hughes returned to play for the Cincinnati Kings in the USL Premier Development League in 2010.

Jeff signed for the Major Indoor Soccer League club, the Syracuse Silver Knights in 2011.

Hughes signed on to be a midfielder and the head coach of the Cincinnati Kings of the Professional Arena Soccer League for the 2012–13 season. Although he led the Kings to qualify for the postseason and was the team's leading scorer, he was released on January 25, 2013. Hughes signed with the Missouri Comets of the Major Indoor Soccer League the same day.
