= St. Louis Illusion =

- Full name: St. Louis Illusion
- Founded: 2008
- Capacity: ?
- Owner: Jamie Swanner
- Head Coach: Jamie Swanner
- League: Professional Arena Soccer League
Home colors	Away colors

The St. Louis Illusion were an American arena soccer team founded in 2008. The team disbanded in 2010.

The team was a charter member of the Professional Arena Soccer League (PASL-Pro), the first division of arena (indoor) soccer in North America. They won the 2008-09 United States Open Cup for Arena Soccer, the first tournament in the series.

== Arena ==
- Dellwood Indoor Soccer Arena (2010)
- The Game Arena in Glen Carbon, Illinois (2008–2010)

== Roster ==
As of December 7, 2008 Note: Flags indicate national team as defined under FIFA eligibility rules; some limited exceptions apply. Players may hold more than one non-FIFA nationality.

No.	Pos.	Nation	Player
0	GK	USA	Jamie Swanner
1	GK	BIH	Irfan Kudic
2	FW	BIH	Anel Ibricic
3	MF	USA	Danny Wynn
4	MF	BIH	Damir Kordic
5	DF	USA	Kevin Kalish
7	FW	USA	Daryl Doran
8	DF	USA	DJ Newsom
9	FW	BIH	Elvir Kafedzic
10	DF	BIH	Vedad Alagic
11	MF	USA	Justin Judiscak
12	MF	USA	Kevin Thibodeau
13	MF	USA	Mike Zagel

No.	Pos.	Nation	Player
14	FW	USA	Roger Gemoules
15	DF	USA	Justin McMillan
16	FW	USA	Carlton Williams
17	DF	USA	Ricky Andrews
18	DF	USA	Matt Little
19	DF	BIH	Taib Dedic
20	FW	USA	Brandon Gibbs
21	FW	USA	Joe Reiniger
22	MF	USA	Jarius Holmes
23	MF	USA	Jeff DiMaria
25	MF	USA	Mike Kirchhoff
28	DF	BIH	Alen Bradaric
99	GK	USA	Jason Norsic

== Year-by-year ==
Year	Win	Loss	League	Division	Reg. season	Playoffs	Attendance
2008–09	8	8	PASL-Pro	Eastern	2nd East	DNQ	473
2009–10	6	10	PASL-Pro	Eastern	5th East	DNQ	295
Totals	14	18					

== Awards and honors ==
- 2008-09 United States Open Cup for Arena Soccer champions

== Playoff record ==
Year	Win	Loss	Tie	GF	GA	GD
2008–2009	0	0	0	0	0	0
Total	0	0	0	0	0	0
