= California Cougars =

- Full name: California Cougars
- Founded: 2004
- Dissolved: 2011
- Ground: Stockton Arena
- Capacity: 10,050
- Managing Partners: misl
Home colors	Away colors

The California Cougars were an indoor soccer team, founded in 2004. The team was a charter member of the Professional Arena Soccer League (PASL-Pro), the first division of arena (indoor) soccer in North America.

They played their home matches at the Stockton Arena in Stockton, California. Their team colors were red, gold and black. The team's head coach was Antonio Sutton.

== History ==
In February 2004, John Thomas, a real estate developer, purchased an expansion team in the Major Indoor Soccer League for Stockton, California. The team was named the California Cougars so that it would represent all of northern California as a regional team.

The first general manager was Dennis Lukens, a former "A" League GM who oversaw the start up operation. He was succeeded by Emily Ballus, a former executive with the WUSA. Because it is only 40 miles (64 km) south of Sacramento, the team hoped to draw fans of the old Sacramento Knights of the CISL and WISL. The team began play in the 2005–2006 season after the construction of its arena. In August 2006, the team was purchased by Rick and Greg Toy and their brother in-law Jim Rachels.

In May 2008, the team announced that it was joining the Professional Arena Soccer League and would be renamed the Stockton Cougars. In April 2009, local businessman Fred Walke purchased majority interest in the franchise. For the 2009–2010 season Stockton Cougars went back to calling itself California Cougars.

=== Year-by-year ===
Year	League	Logo	Reg. season	Playoffs	Avg. attendance
2005–2006	MISL II		6th MISL, 10–20	Did not qualify	3,170
2006–2007	MISL II		6th MISL, 7–23	Did not qualify	3,612
2007–2008	MISL II		8th MISL, 11–19	Did not qualify	5,095
2008–2009	PASL-Pro		1st Western,12–4	Won Championship	2,358
2009–2010	PASL-Pro		2nd Western, 12–4	Lost Semifinal	942
2010–2011	PASL-Pro		4th Western, 5–10	Did not qualify	721

=== Playoff record ===
Year	Win	Loss	GF	GA	GD
2008–2009	2	0	23	14	9
2009–2010	1	1	13	14	−1
Total	3	1	36	28	8

== Coaches ==
=== Head coaches ===
- (United States) Troy Dayak (2005–2007)
- (United States) Bernie Lilavois (2007–2009)
- (United States) Antonio Sutton (2009–2011)

=== Assistant coaches ===
- (United States) Dennis Lukens (2005–2006)
- (United States) Antonio Sutton (2007–2009)
- (United States) Aaron Susi (2008–2011)

== Arenas ==
- Stockton Arena (2005–2011)
