= Waza FC =

Indoor soccer team

Coordinates: 42.430°N 83.392°W

Detroit Waza
- Full name: Detroit Waza
- Nickname: Waza Flo
- Founded: 2008; 18 years ago
- Stadium: Bicentennial Park; Livonia, Michigan
- Co-Owner: Dominic Scicluna
- Co-Owner: Mario Scicluna
- League: Premier Arena Soccer League
- 2017–18: 5th, Eastern Division; Playoffs: Did not qualify
- Website: http://www.wazafc.com/
Home colors	Away colors	Third colors

The Waza FC (also known as Detroit Waza) is an American professional arena soccer team based in Metro Detroit competing as a charter member of the Major League Indoor Soccer (MLIS). The team's nickname, "Waza", is both a Japanese word that means "good technique" (技) and a Swahili word meaning "to think clearly".

== History ==
The team was founded in 2008 as Detroit Waza Flo, and were a charter member of PASL-pro, the league that was an offshoot of the Professional Arena Soccer League (PASL) and would eventually be rechristened the MASL in 2014. The team had 3 homes during its 7 seasons in the Detroit area, the last 2 of which were at the Melvindale Ice Arena in suburban Melvindale, Michigan. In September 2015, the team announced it would play its home matches for the 2015-16 MASL season at the Dort Federal Credit Union Event Center in Flint, Michigan. As part of the process, the team dropped the "Detroit" from its name and logo, becoming simply Waza Flo; should they receive a welcome reception in Flint, team ownership noted it would consider adding "Flint" to the team's name. The team previously competed in the Major Arena Soccer League 2 (M2).

On October 4, the team was rebranded "Detroit Waza" and joined Major League Indoor Soccer for the 2022 season.

== Staff ==
- Dominic Scicluna - Co-Owner/Captain
- Mario Scicluna - Co-Owner
- Kathy Coyne - General Manager
- Leif Larsen - Director of Operations

== Year-by-year ==
League champions	Runners-Up	Division champions	Playoff berth

Year	Win	Loss	League	Reg. season	Playoffs	Attendance	U.S. Open Cup
2008–09	7	9	PASL-Pro	4th Eastern	DNQ	3,324	Championship Game
2009–10	6	10	PASL-Pro	4th Eastern	DNQ	146	Quarter-Finals
2010–11	8	8	PASL-Pro	3rd Eastern	DNQ	301	Round of 16
2011–12	13	3	PASL	1st Eastern	Lost Finals	454	Quarter-Finals
2012–13	14	2	PASL	1st Eastern	Lost Finals	410	U.S. Open Cup Champions
2013–14	10	5	PASL	2nd Eastern	Lost Divisional Playoff	565	Round of 16
2014–15	4	14	MASL	4th Eastern	DNQ	612	N/A
2015–16	9	9	MASL	3rd Eastern	Lost Divisional Playoff	968	N/A
2016–17	On Hiatus						
2017–18	2	10	MASL 2	5th Eastern	DNQ	N/A	N/A
2018–19	7	5	MASL 2	3rd Eastern	DNQ	N/A	N/A

== Playoff record ==
Organization logo

Year	Win	Loss	GF	GA
2011-2012	2	1	23	23
2012-2013	3	1	27	22
2013-2014	0	1	6	7
2015-2016	0	1	3	5
Total	5	4	59	57

== Awards and honors ==
Division titles:

- 2011-12 PASL Eastern Division
- 2012-13 PASL Eastern Division

Championships:

- 2012-13 U.S. Open Cup

== Arenas ==
- Compuware Arena, Plymouth, Michigan (2008–2009)
- Taylor Sportsplex, Taylor, Michigan (2009–2013)
- Melvindale Ice Arena, Melvindale, Michigan (2013–2015)
- Dort Federal Credit Union Event Center, Flint, Michigan (2015–2016)
- Melvindale Ice Arena, Melvindale, Michigan (2017)
- Detroit City Fieldhouse, Detroit, Michigan 2018-
