= Ohio Vortex =

- Founded: 2009
- Dissolved: 2013
- Ground: Canton Civic Center; Canton, Ohio
- Capacity: 4,500
- Executive Director: Jodi Wayble
- Head Coach: Denzil Antonio
- League: Professional Arena Soccer League
Home colours

Ohio Vortex was an American professional indoor soccer team based in Canton, Ohio. They joined the Professional Arena Soccer League in 2009. The Ohio Vortex was a non-profit organization that donates a portion of their revenue to local charities. The team was founded by former Canton Invaders player Nick Bogdan.

The Ohio Vortex ended their inaugural season 8-8. The club was coached by Canton Invaders legend Denzil Antonio. The team shut down after the 2012–13 season.

== Year-by-year ==
Year	League	Record	GS	GA	Finish	Playoffs	Avg. attendance
2009–10	PASL-Pro	8-8	120	136	3rd Eastern	Did not qualify	517
2010–11	PASL-Pro	2-14	82	119	4th Eastern	Did not qualify	492
2011–12	PASL	4-12	100	145	6th Eastern	Did not qualify	418
2012–13	PASL	1-15	40	169	5th Eastern	Did not qualify	210

== History ==
The Ohio Vortex could have continued the tradition that its predecessor had by calling themselves the Canton Invaders. However, founder Nick Bogdan wanted a unique name and not one that has been recycled by other sports teams. The team got its Vortex name as a result of the charity work that it does. He called the team the Vortex because the team plays for a variety of charities that pull people in from all over the state to help support the causes.

The Vortex began play in the 2009–10 season at the Cleveland Metroplex Events Center in Warrensville Heights, Ohio, before settling into the Canton Civic Center in Canton, Ohio. On October 26, 2012, the team announced it was moving to Oberlin, Ohio and play their home games at the Gameday Sports Center. The team then relocated to the Pinnacle Sports Complex in Medina, Ohio, after the first two home games. The team folded after the 2012–13 season.

== Mission ==
A portion of proceeds from every ticket sold to a Vortex game will be given to diverse local non-profit organizations that work for the greater good. At the end of their inaugural season, approximately $10,000 was given to charities in Northeast Ohio.

== Arenas ==
- Canton Civic Center, Canton, Ohio (2009-2012)
- Gameday Sports Center, Oberlin, Ohio (2012)
- Pinnacle Sports Complex, Medina, Ohio (2012–2013)
