= Cincinnati Kings Indoor Team =

American arena soccer team

Cincinnati Kings
- Full name: Cincinnati Kings Indoor Team
- Short name: Cincinnati Kings
- Founded: 2008
- Dissolved: 2013; 13 years ago
- Ground: GameTime Training Center; Fairfield, Ohio
- Capacity: 800
- General Manager: Tim Burgess
- Head Coach: Matt Breines
- League: Professional Arena Soccer League
Home colors	Away colors

The Cincinnati Kings Indoor Team was an American arena soccer team founded in 2008. Many of the team's initial personnel came from the Cincinnati Excite of the American Indoor Soccer League. The team formed a partnership with the Cincinnati Kings to provide year-round professional soccer in Cincinnati.

The team was a charter member of the Professional Arena Soccer League (PASL).

== Current roster ==
28 November 2010 Note: Flags indicate national team as defined under FIFA eligibility rules; some limited exceptions apply. Players may hold more than one non-FIFA nationality.

No.	Pos.	Nation	Player
1	GK	USA	Craig Salvati
1	GK	USA	Jay Schneider
4	DF	USA	Kenneth Bertz
7	DF	USA	Garrett Buck
14	DF	USA	Chris Dobrowolski
14	DF	USA	Jeff Henderson
9	FW	USA	Matt Breines
27	FW	USA	Salvatore Fiore
11	FW	USA	Rashaun Lamar

No.	Pos.	Nation	Player
12	MF	USA	George Davis
8	MF	USA	Eddie Hertsenberg
23	MF	USA	Jeff Hughes
10	MF	USA	Shawn Rockey
5	MF	USA	Adam Ross
12	MF	USA	Kwame Sarkodie

=== Year-by-year ===
League champions	Runners-Up	Division champions	Playoff berth

Year	Win	Loss	League	Reg. season	Playoffs	Attendance
2008–09	13	3	PASL-Pro	1st, Eastern	lost in Final	373
2009–10	12	4	PASL-Pro	1st, Eastern	lost in Quarterfinal	488
2010–11	13	3	PASL-Pro	1st, Eastern	lost in Semifinals	1,206
2011–12	6	10	PASL	5th, Eastern	Did not qualify	1,201
2012–13	11	5	PASL	2nd Eastern	lost in Divisional Final	237

=== Playoff record ===
Year	Win	Loss	GF	GA	GD
2008–2009	1	1	15	19	-4
2009–2010	0	1	5	6	-1
2010–2011	0	1	7	11	-4
2012–2013	0	2	9	15	-6
Total	1	5	36	51	-15

=== Arenas ===
- Cincinnati Gardens – 2010–2012
- GameTime Training Center – 2008–2010; 2012–2013
