= 2014–15 Chicago Mustangs season =

Chicago Mustangs
2014–15 MASL season
- Owner: Armando Gamboa
- Head Coach: Armando Gamboa
- Arena: Sears Centre; 5333 Prairie Stone Parkway; Hoffman Estates, Illinois 60192
- Major Arena Soccer League: 3rd, Central (regular season)
- Ron Newman Cup: Lost Division Semi-Final
- Top goalscorer: Efrain "Wilo" Martinez (16 goals, 16 assists)
- Highest home attendance: 2,483 (November 8 vs. Missouri Comets)
- Lowest home attendance: 991 (January 4 vs. Rochester Lancers)
- Average home league attendance: 1,672 (10 games)

The 2014–15 Chicago Mustangs season was the third season of the Chicago Mustangs professional indoor soccer club. The Mustangs, a Central Division team in the Major Arena Soccer League, played their home games at the Sears Centre in the Chicago suburb of Hoffman Estates, Illinois.

The team was led by team owner/head coach Armando Gamboa and assistant coach Freddy Ochoa. The Mustangs, PASL champions in 2013–14, struggled in the first year of the MASL but managed to amass an 11–9 record, good enough for 3rd place in the Central Division and a berth in the playoffs. Chicago was eliminated by the Milwaukee Wave in the Central Division Semi-Finals, winning the first game but losing the second and the mini-game tie-breaker.

== Season summary ==
Coming off an undefeated season and the PASL championship, much was expected from Chicago in 2014–15 but they largely failed to deliver. They dropped the first game to the MISL champion Missouri Comets, split a home-and-home series with the St. Louis Ambush then lost 2 of their next 3 to limp into December at 24. They found their footing with 5 consecutive wins in December and early January. They struggled the rest of the way, winning only 4 games of the remaining 9. Still, the Mustangs qualified for the post-season with a 119 record and third-place in the Central Division. Playing a home-and-home series for the Division Semi-Finals, Chicago beat Milwaukee at the Sears Centre but lost the second game and the tie-breaking mini-game (in overtime) on the road.

== History ==
The Mustangs are named for the original Chicago Mustangs that was a founding member of the United Soccer Association in 1967 and played in the North American Soccer League (NASL) in 1968 before becoming a semi-pro team in 1969.

The Mustangs were successful in their inaugural season in the Professional Arena Soccer League, finishing 11–5, but failed to qualify for the postseason in the competitive Central Division. In their second season, the team Chicago was undefeated in the regular season and went on to win the Ron Newman Cup in the PASL Championship match. Armando Gamboa was named Coach of the Year, forward Efrain "Wilo" Martinez was named the league's Most Valuable Player for the regular season, and goalkeeper Jesus Flores was awarded the Aaron Susi Trophy as the Most Valuable Player in the post-season. The Mustangs also won the 2013–14 United States Open Cup for Arena Soccer.

== Off-field moves ==
In May 2014, the Professional Arena Soccer League added six teams from the failed third incarnation of the Major Indoor Soccer League and reorganized as the Major Arena Soccer League. The 2014–15 MASL season will be 20 games long, 4 more than the 16 regular season games of recent PASL seasons. With the league expansion and reorganization, the Mustangs move from the Eastern back to the Central division where their rivals for 2014–15 are the Milwaukee Wave, St. Louis Ambush, Tulsa Revolution, Wichita B-52s, and Kansas City-based Missouri Comets.

On December 29, the team announced the hirings of Ray Kincaid to serve as General Manager and Adam Cumbee to Director of Media and Outreach. Kincaid has worked in sales and management of Chicago pro sports teams since 2006 with his most recent post as the GM of the Chicago Outlaws in the Continental Indoor Lacrosse League.

== Schedule ==
Win Loss Cancelled

=== Regular season ===
Game	Day	Date	Kickoff	Opponent	Results		Location	Attendance
Game	Day	Date	Kickoff	Opponent	Score	Record	Location	Attendance
1	Saturday	November 8	7:05pm	Missouri Comets	L 12–6	0–1	Sears Centre	2,483
2	Saturday	November 15	7:35pm	at St. Louis Ambush	W 8–3	1–1	Family Arena	4,207
3	Saturday	November 22	7:05pm	St. Louis Ambush	L 7–8	1–2	Sears Centre	1,253
4	Saturday	November 29	7:05pm	Milwaukee Wave	W 5–4	2–2	Sears Centre	2,443
5	Friday	December 5	7:05pm	at Missouri Comets	L 6–15	2–3	Independence Events Center	3,369
6	Saturday	December 6	7:05pm	at Wichita B-52s	L 5–8	2–4	Hartman Arena	1,539
7	Sunday	December 14	3:05pm	Detroit Waza	W 15–4	3–4	Sears Centre	1,724
8	Saturday	December 20	7:05pm	at Detroit Waza	W 10–9	4–4	Melvindale Civic Center	547
9	Saturday	December 27	7:05pm	St. Louis Ambush	W 5–4	5–4	Sears Centre	2,006
10	Saturday	January 3	7:05pm	Tulsa Revolution	W 16–2	6–4	Sears Centre	1,244
11	Sunday	January 4	3:05pm	Rochester Lancers	W 5–4 (OT)	7–4	Sears Centre	991
12	Saturday	January 10	6:05pm	at Milwaukee Wave	L 5–8	7–5	UW–Milwaukee Panther Arena	2,960
13	Sunday	January 18	3:05pm	Tulsa Revolution	W 9–1	8–5	Sears Centre	1,007
14	Saturday	January 24	7:05pm	at Tulsa Revolution^{2}	W 3–0	9–5	Expo Square Pavilion	Forfeit
15	Friday	January 30	7:35pm	at Missouri Comets	L 2–7	9–6	Independence Events Center	5,355
16	Saturday	January 31	7:05pm	Wichita B-52s	W 8–5	10–6	Sears Centre	1,556
17	Saturday	February 14	7:05pm	at Detroit Waza	W 11–10 (OT)	11–6	Melvindale Civic Center	678
18	Sunday	February 15	3:05pm	Syracuse Silver Knights	L 3–7	11–7	Sears Centre	2,018
19	Thursday	February 19	7:00pm	at Syracuse Silver Knights♠	L 16–23	11–8	Oncenter War Memorial Arena	3,169
20	Friday	February 20	7:35pm	at Baltimore Blast♠	L 0–24	11–9	Royal Farms Arena	6,642

♠ Game played with multi-point scoring (most goals worth 2 points and select goals worth 3 points).
^{2} Game cancelled due to "complications moving the turf"; Tulsa forfeits.

=== Post-season ===
Game	Day	Date	Kickoff	Opponent	Results		Location	Attendance
Game	Day	Date	Kickoff	Opponent	Score	Record	Location	Attendance
Division Playoff #1	Thursday	February 26	7:35pm	Milwaukee Wave	W 6–3	1–0	Sears Centre	1,443
Division Playoff #2	Saturday	March 7	3:05pm	at Milwaukee Wave	L 2–9	1–11	UW–Milwaukee Panther Arena	2,888
Division Playoff #3	Saturday	March 7	6:05pm	at Milwaukee Wave^{3}	L 1–2 (OT)	1–2	UW–Milwaukee Panther Arena	2,888

^{3} Mini-game played as a tie-breaker.
