= 2013–14 Chicago Mustangs season =

Chicago Mustangs
2013–14 PASL season
- Owner: Armando Gamboa
- Head Coach: Armando Gamboa
- Arena: Odeum Expo Center; 1033 North Villa Ave. Villa Park, Illinois 60181; Grand Sports Arena; 2350 Hassell Road; Hoffman Estates, Illinois 60169
- Professional Arena Soccer League: 1st, Eastern
- Ron Newman Cup: Champion
- US Open Cup: Champion
- Highest home attendance: 992 (February 16 vs. Cincinnati Saints)
- Lowest home attendance: 598 (December 28 vs. Illinois Piasa)
- Average home league attendance: 779 (8 games)

The 2013–14 Chicago Mustangs season was the second season of the Chicago Mustangs professional indoor soccer club. The Mustangs, an Eastern Division team in the Professional Arena Soccer League, split their regular season home games between the Odeum Expo Center in Villa Park, Illinois, and the Grand Sports Arena in Hoffman Estates.

The team was led by team president and head coach Armando Gamboa with assistant coach Freddy Ochoa. Chicago was undefeated in the regular season and went on to win the Ron Newman Cup in the PASL Championship match. Armando Gamboa was named Coach of the Year, forward Efrain "Wilo" Martinez was named the league's Most Valuable Player for the regular season, and goalkeeper Jesus Flores was awarded the Aaron Susi Trophy as the Most Valuable Player in the post-season. The Mustangs also won the 2013–14 United States Open Cup for Arena Soccer.

== Season summary ==
The Mustangs are this season's only undefeated team in the PASL. Finishing with a 16–0 record and winning by an average of more than 9 goals per game at home and by 6 on the road, the only place the Mustangs have struggled is at the box office. Averaging just 779 fans per game, this ranks Chicago 9th in the 20-team league for average attendance.

On January 22, the PASL announced that Chicago would host the PASL Ron Newman Cup Final Four tournament at the Sears Centre while the amateur Premier Arena Soccer League will hold its championship at the Grand Sports Arena, the Mustangs' usual home field this season. As host, Chicago gets an automatic bye past the playoffs and directly to the Final Four tournament on March 15–16, 2014. They defeated the Cleveland Freeze 10–3 in their semifinal match on March 15 to advance to the Championship game against Hidalgo La Fiera on March 16. Chicago won 15–4, becoming the first non-California team to win the PASL Championship.

The Chicago Mustangs also participated in the 2013–14 United States Open Cup for Arena Soccer starting with a Round of 32 victory (by forfeit) over independent TOSB FC followed by a Round of 16 victory over the independent A.A.C. Eagles on Sunday, December 22. Chicago visited the Wichita B-52s on February 1 for a regular season match that doubled as an Open Cup quarter-final game and advanced to host the Cleveland Freeze in a standalone semi-final game. The Mustangs faced Hidalgo La Fiera in the final game on March 16 in a game that also doubled as the PASL Championship game. Chicago won 15–4.

== History ==
The Mustangs are named for the original Chicago Mustangs that was a founding member of the United Soccer Association in 1967 and played in the North American Soccer League (NASL) in 1968 before becoming a semi-pro team in 1969.

The Mustangs were successful in their inaugural season in the PASL, finishing 11–5, but failed to qualify for the postseason in the competitive Central Division. The team fared better at home than on the road, winning 7 of 8 home games but splitting the road games with 4 wins and 4 losses. The Mustangs participated in the 2012–13 United States Open Cup for Arena Soccer. They defeated the Rockford Rampage, Illinois Piasa, and Cincinnati Saints before falling to the Detroit Waza in the semi-finals.

== Roster moves ==
On November 1, the Mustangs announced that defenders Guilherme Veiga, Alex Paredes, Joshio Sandoval, Carlos Reyes, and David Aranda as well as midfielders Aurinei "Chico" Parisotto and Jose Mendoza had all been signed to complete the team roster in advance of their home debut. Adrian Ortiz was named a team captain.

== Awards and honors ==
=== Player of the Week ===
On November 12, 2013, the Professional Arena Soccer League named forward Efrain Martinez as the PASL Player of the Week. The league cited his outstanding offensive efforts, including two hat tricks in two games.

On December 10, 2013, the PASL named midfielder Miguel Vaca as their Player of the Week. The league cited his hat trick in the previous weekend's match against Detroit Waza and his consistent offensive efforts.

On December 31, 2013, the PASL named goalkeeper Jesus Flores as the league's Player of the Week. The league cited his shutout of the Illinois Piasa (only the 6th in PASL history) and his improved statistics as compared to last season.

On January 21, 2014, the PASL named forward Bryan Velazquez Moya as their Player of the Week. The league cited his offensive output, including 5 goals and 2 assists in his team's victory over the Cleveland Freeze the previous weekend.

=== Year-end honors ===
On February 26, 2014, the PASL announced its "All-League" honors. Forward Efrain Martinez was named to the All-League First Team. Midfielder Miguel Vaca, defender Josh Grossman, and goalkeeper Jesus Flores were named to the All-League Second Team. Forward Bryan Moya and defender Omar Santillan were named to the All-League Honorable Mention list.

On March 7, 2014, the PASL announced its annual year-end awards at a press conference in Chicago. Chicago head coach Armando Gamboa was named Coach of the Year for leading his squad to an undefeated 16–0 season. Chicago forward Efrain "Wilo" Martinez was named the league's Most Valuable Player for the 2013–14 regular season. Martinez led the PASL in points and was tied for the lead in goals.

On March 16, 2014, the PASL awarded the Aaron Susi Trophy to Chicago goalkeeper and team captain Jesus Flores as the PASL Playoff's Most Valuable Player. The league cited the fact that Flores played "every minute of every game" in leading his team to am undefeated season and the Ron Newman Cup.

== Schedule ==
Win Loss Bye

=== Regular season ===
| Game | Day | Date | Kickoff | Opponent | Results | | Location | Attendance |
| Game | Day | Date | Kickoff | Opponent | Score | Record | Location | Attendance |
|---|---|---|---|---|---|---|---|---|
| 1 | Saturday | November 2 | 4:05pm | Tulsa Revolution | W 10–5 | 1–0 | Odeum Expo Center | 833 |
| 2 | Saturday | November 9 | 7:35pm | at Cincinnati Saints | W 7–6 | 2–0 | Tri-County Soccerplex | 314 |
| 3 | Saturday | November 16 | 7:05pm | Illinois Piasa | W 15–2 | 3–0 | Grand Sports Arena | 805 |
| 4 | Sunday | December 1 | 4:05pm | Wichita B-52s | W 9–5 | 4–0 | Odeum Expo Center | 627 |
| 5 | Sunday | December 8 | 4:05pm | Detroit Waza | W 13–9 | 5–0 | Grand Sports Arena | 565 |
| 6 | Friday | December 13 | 7:05pm | at Cleveland Freeze | W 13–4 | 6–0 | Soccer Sportsplex | 448 |
| 7 | Saturday | December 14 | 7:05pm | at Detroit Waza | W 6–5 | 7–0 | Melvindale Civic Center | 203 |
| 8 | Saturday | December 28 | 7:05pm | Illinois Piasa | W 8–0 | 8–0 | Grand Sports Arena | 598 |
| 9 | Saturday | January 11 | 7:35pm | at Illinois Piasa | W 13–1 | 9–0 | The Field Sports Complex | 109 |
| 10 | Saturday | January 18 | 5:05pm | Cleveland Freeze | W 20–11 | 10–0 | Grand Sports Arena | 684 |
| 11 | Friday | January 24 | 7:05pm | at Harrisburg Heat | W 13–7 | 11–0 | Farm Show Complex Equine Arena | 1,895 |
| 12 | Saturday | January 25 | 7:05pm | at Harrisburg Heat | W 12–5 | 12–0 | Farm Show Complex Equine Arena | 2,373 |
| 13 | Friday | January 31 | 7:05pm | at Tulsa Revolution | W 16–9 | 13–0 | Cox Business Center | 664 |
| 14 | Saturday | February 1 | 7:05pm | at Wichita B-52s† | W 10–5 | 14–0 | Hartman Arena | 1,558 |
| 15 | Sunday | February 9 | 4:05pm | Harrisburg Heat | W 14–3 | 15–0 | Grand Sports Arena | 748 |
| 16 | Sunday | February 16 | 4:05pm | Cincinnati Saints♥ | W 23–6 | 16–0 | Grand Sports Arena | 992 |

† Game also counts for US Open Cup, as listed in chart below.
♥ Postponed from January 5 due to extreme winter weather

=== Post-season ===
| Round | Day | Date | Kickoff | Opponent | Results | | Location | Attendance |
| Round | Day | Date | Kickoff | Opponent | Score | Record | Location | Attendance |
|---|---|---|---|---|---|---|---|---|
| Eastern Division | BYE | | | | | | | |
| PASL Semifinals | Saturday | March 15 | 7:30pm | Cleveland Freeze | W 10–3 | 1–0 | Sears Centre | 3,863 |
| PASL Finals | Sunday | March 16 | 4:30pm | Hidalgo La Fiera† | W 15–4 | 2–0 | Sears Centre | 3,969 |

† Game also counts for US Open Cup, as listed in chart below.

=== U.S. Open Cup for Arena Soccer ===
| Game | Day | Date | Kickoff | Opponent | Results | | Location | Attendance |
| Game | Day | Date | Kickoff | Opponent | Score | Record | Location | Attendance |
|---|---|---|---|---|---|---|---|---|
| Round of 32 | Forfeit | | | TOSB FC | W 3–0 | 1–0 | — | N/A |
| Round of 16 | Sunday | December 22 | 2:05pm | A.A.C. Eagles | W 10–5 | 2–0 | Grand Sports Arena | 558 |
| Quarter finals | Saturday | February 1 | 7:05pm | at Wichita B-52s | W 10–5 | 3–0 | Hartman Arena | 1,558 |
| Semi finals | Saturday | February 22 | 4:05pm | Cleveland Freeze | W 15–10 | 4–0 | Grand Sports Arena | 455 |
| Final | Sunday | March 16 | 4:30pm | Hidalgo La Fiera | W 15–4 | 5–0 | Sears Centre | 3,969 |
