= Sports in Wichita, Kansas =

Wichita, Kansas is home to several professional, amateur, and college sports teams.

== Teams ==
=== Professional/Semi-pro ===
- Wichita Wings, professional indoor soccer
- Kansas Stars, professional baseball
- Wichita Turbo Tubs, professional baseball
- Wichita Thunder, professional ice hockey
- FC Wichita, Semi-professional soccer
- Wichita Force, professional Indoor football
- Kansas Diamondbacks Minor-Pro Football, member of the Central Midwest Football League
- Wichita Skyhawks Semi-Pro football, member of the Central Midwest Football League

=== Non-professional ===
- Wichita Barbarians, Rugby union
- Wichita World 11, Cricket
- ICT Roller Derby, Roller Derby

=== Collegiate ===
- Friends University Falcons Athletics including Baseball, Football, Volleyball, Soccer, Cross Country, Basketball, Tennis, Track and Field, and Golf
- Newman University Jets Athletics including Baseball, Basketball, Bowling, Cross Country, Golf, Soccer, Tennis, Wrestling, Volleyball, Cheer/Dance
- Wichita State Shockers Athletics, including Men's and Women's Basketball, Baseball, Volleyball, Track and Field, Tennis and Bowling.

The Wichita State Shockers have successful records in several sports including baseball, basketball, and bowling:

- WSU Shockers Baseball team reached seven Collegiate World Series and one National Championship (1989).
- WSU Shockers Basketball team completed its 2013–2014 season undefeated in regular play, and reached the NCAA "Final Four" before being defeated by the eventual National Champions. Shocker Basketball teams—men's and women's -- have produced several national basketball stars and Olympic gold medalists.
- WSU Shockers Bowling team's number of national championships (19) is unmatched in the nation.

=== High school ===
- Crusaders Unified HS Boys Lacrosse Team established in 2014 and is a Catholic lacrosse program whose members are students from Kapaun HS. The feeder program is College Hill Lacrosse Club established in 2006 and whose members attend east side Catholic middle schools.
- Wichita Rowing Association HS Rowing Team that practices and competes year round.

== Sports organizations & institutions ==
- The National Baseball Congress, the national umbrella organization of the minor leagues, has a long history with Wichita, which has served as the NBC's home and National Tournament site (at Lawrence–Dumont Stadium)
- The Kansas Sports Hall of Fame, http://kshof.org/, at the Wichita Boathouse
- The Wichita Sports Hall of Fame and Museum, http://www.wichitahof.com/

== Venues ==
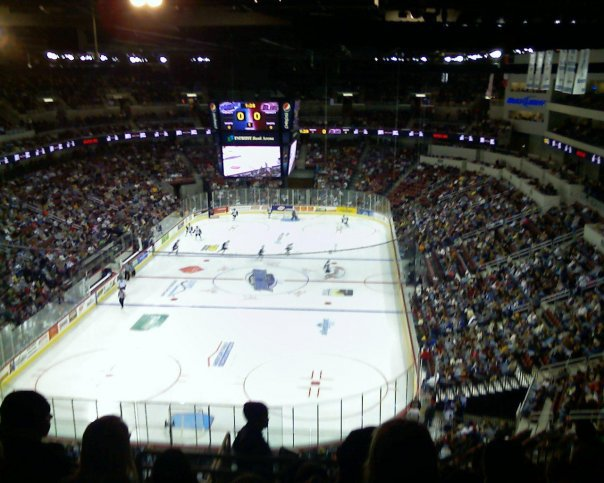

- Intrust Bank Arena is a 15,000-seat multi-purpose arena located in Wichita. It is home to the Wichita Thunder of the ECHL.
- Equity Bank Park is a 10,025 person capacity baseball stadium located just west of the Arkansas River in Delano. It is home to the Wichita Turbo Tubs of the Texas League, the Double-A affiliate of the Minnesota Twins.
- Century II Performing Arts & Convention Center a multi-function downtown complex, city-owned, with convention center, concert and exhibition halls and other facilities, it has been used for professional wrestling tournaments, sporting-goods exhibitions, and other recreational activity.
- Charles Koch Arena (formerly Henry Levitt Arena) at Wichita State University, a medium-sized, sunken, dome-roofed circular arena with a collegiate basketball court. Home to the WSU Shocker basketball team. Also used extensively for citywide and regional high school athletic events, concerts and other entertainments.
- Eck Stadium at Wichita State University, an elaborate, medium-sized stadium with a full-sized baseball field, home to the WSU Shocker Baseball team.
- 81 Motor Speedway: An oval motor-vehicle racetrack just north of the city, used extensively for a wide range of car, truck and motorcycle races, and other motor sports events.
- Hartman Arena, a private arena in Park City, a suburb just north of Wichita, and home to the Wichita Wings of the Major Arena Soccer League 2, and Wichita Force of Champions Indoor Football.
- Sam Fulco Pavilions: in Park City, a suburb just north of Wichita (next to the abandoned Kansas Coliseum), a moderate-capacity low-roofed arena developed for small rodeos, horse shows and livestock competitions and exhibitions, widely used for other purposes.
- Wichita Ice Arena: Just west of downtown Wichita, a public ice-skating rink, also used for ice-skating competitions.
- Adair-Austin Stadium is home of the Friends University Falcons, the 5,000-seat stadium is home of the football and soccer teams and is home to the track and field team.
