= 2014–15 Wichita B-52s season =

Wichita B-52s
2014–15 MASL season
- Owner: Joseph Pindell
- Head Coach: Jeff Kraft (games 1-5); Darin Smith (game 6); Kim Roentved (games 7-)
- Arena: Hartman Arena; 8151 N. Hartman Arena Drive; Park City, Kansas 67147
- Major Arena Soccer League: 4th, Central (regular season)
- Top goalscorer: Matt Clare (35 goals, 13 assists)
- Highest home attendance: 2,458 (February 21 vs. Tulsa Revolution)
- Lowest home attendance: 885 (November 16 vs. Oxford City FC of Texas)
- Average home league attendance: 1,703 (10 games)

The 2014–15 Wichita B-52s season was the second season of the Wichita B-52s professional indoor soccer club. The Wichita B-52s, a Central Division team in the Major Arena Soccer League, played their home games at Hartman Arena in Park City, a suburb of Wichita, Kansas.

The team was led by team president Joseph Pindell and head coach Kim Roentved. The B-52s finished the season with a 10–10 record, placing them 4th in the Central and out of the MASL playoffs.

== Season summary ==
Wichita struggled at the start of the season, losing on the road to the Dallas Sidekicks and then defeating the Tulsa Revolution at home before losing their next 3 games. The B-52s began to find their footing with wins over Tulsa and the Chicago Mustangs then losses to the Missouri Comets and Oxford City FC of Texas. A 5-game win streak started with back-to-back road wins over the Seattle Impact and 3 wins over the St. Louis Ambush on 3 consecutive Saturday nights. Wichita lost 4 more games before home-and-road wins over Tulsa to complete the season. The team finished with a 10-10 record, earning fourth place in the Central Division but not qualifying for post-season play.

== History ==
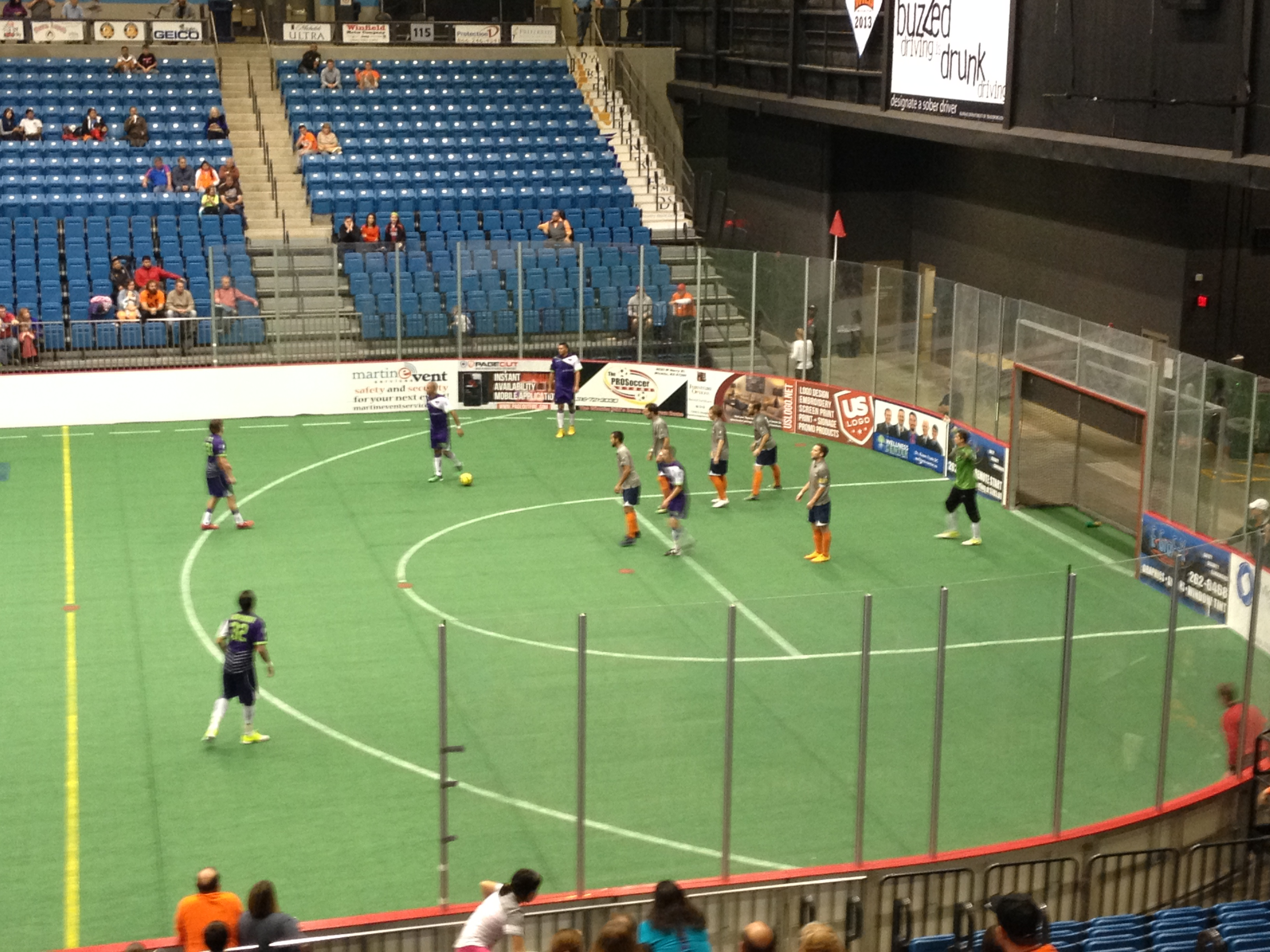
B-52s defending against the Dallas Sidekicks.

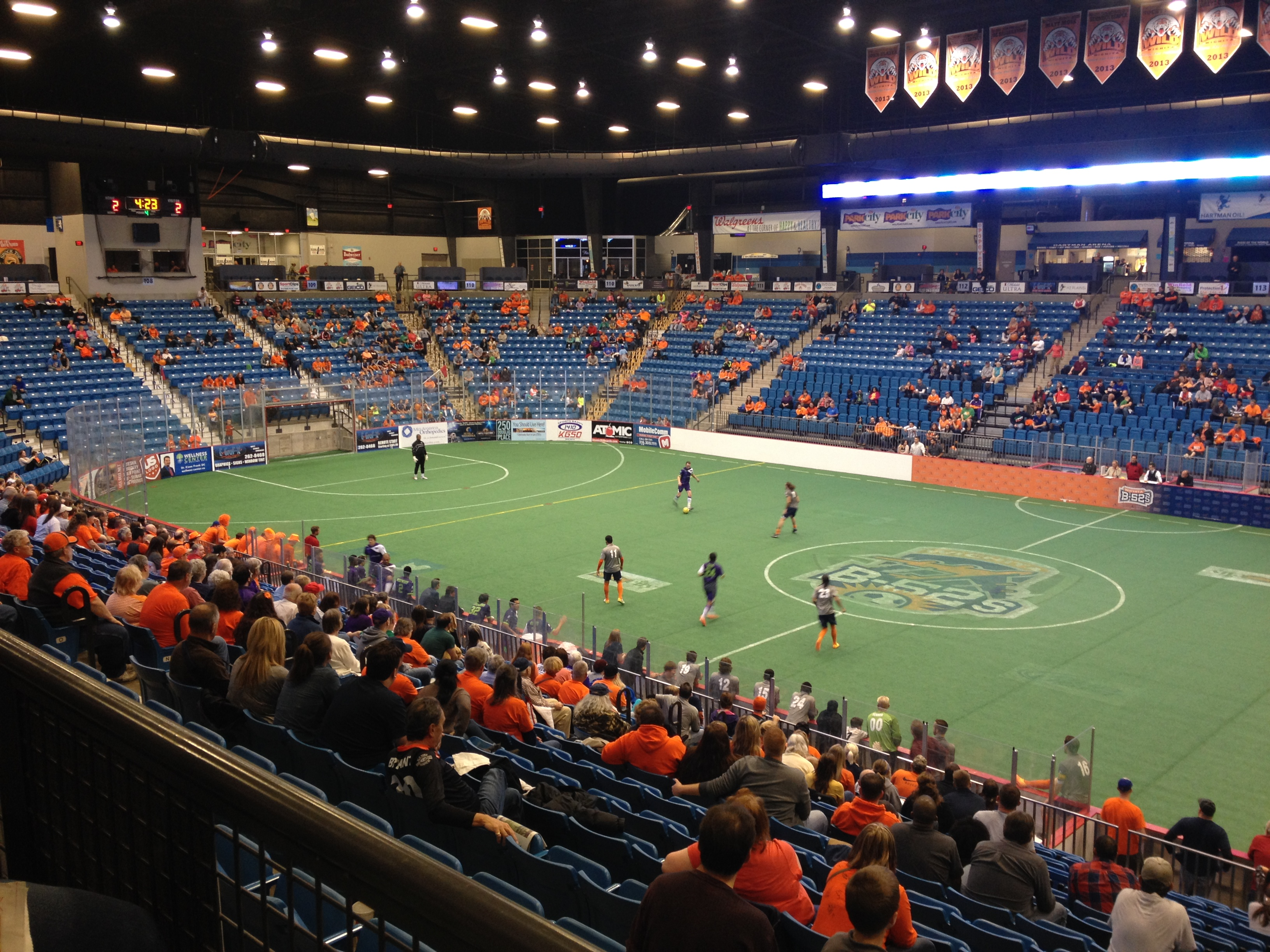
B-52s in action at Hartman Arena.

The B-52s franchise fills a gap left when the second Wichita Wings, a franchise of the third Major Indoor Soccer League, folded in 2013. The B-52s' team colors are based on the Wings' team colors.

In their inaugural season, the B-52 struggled through their first 4 games, beating only the Illinois Piasa and giving up 43 goals with Nic Martinez as the keeper. Jason Dewey was brought in as the new primary goalkeeper, improving the winning percentage and sharply decreasing the number of goals surrendered per game. Wichita earned a 7–9 record but did not qualify for the Ron Newman Cup playoffs. The team performed better at the box office, drawing an average of 1,650 fans per game, placing them 6th in the 20-team league for average attendance.

== Off-field moves ==
In May 2014, the Professional Arena Soccer League added six teams from the failed third incarnation of the Major Indoor Soccer League and reorganized as the Major Arena Soccer League. The 2014–15 MASL season will be 20 games long, 4 more than the 16 regular season games of recent PASL seasons. With the league expansion and reorganization, the B-52s' Central division rivals for 2014–15 are the Chicago Mustangs, Milwaukee Wave, St. Louis Ambush, Tulsa Revolution, and Kansas City-based Missouri Comets.

After an inaugural season where the team lost more games than they won and failed to make the post-season, Wichita released Larry Inlow as head coach in September 2014. New head coach Jeff Kraft is a veteran player and coach with more than 20 years experience in indoor soccer.

In late October, the team hired Kim Roentved as director of soccer operations, a job combining coaching, recruiting, and community outreach. Roentved has strong ties to Wichita, first as a player for the original Wichita Wings from 1980 to 1987 then as a player/coach from 1991 to 1998, with the last 4 of those years as head coach. He had most recently served as the head coach for the Missouri Comets of the now-defunct MISL.

On November 26, with the B-52s earning only a 1–4 record after 5 games and struggling at the box office, the team released head coach Jeff Kraft and named his assistant coach, Darin Smith, to replace him on an interim basis. At the same time, the team released players Damian Garcia and Carlos "Chile" Farias, citing the need to "rebuild" and "to keep moving forward" as a team. On December 2, the team announced Kim Roentved as their new head coach.

In late May 2015, local media reported that some players and staff had worked this season with little or no pay, some checks written by the team to vendors had bounced, and that the team owed Hartman Arena approximately $2,000. Team owner Joey Pindell told KWCH-DT that the "B-52's are experiencing some struggles" but that he was working with MASL officials to resolve their issues.

== Schedule ==
Win Loss

=== Pre-season ===
Game	Day	Date	Kickoff	Opponent	Results		Location	Attendance
Game	Day	Date	Kickoff	Opponent	Score	Record	Location	Attendance
1	Sunday	October 26	5:05pm	Mexican National Indoor Team	L 4–9	0–1	Hartman Arena	

=== Regular season ===
Game	Day	Date	Kickoff	Opponent	Results		Location	Attendance
Game	Day	Date	Kickoff	Opponent	Score	Record	Location	Attendance
1	Saturday	November 1	7:00pm	at Dallas Sidekicks	L 6–7	0–1	Allen Event Center	3,768
2	Saturday	November 8	7:05pm	Tulsa Revolution	W 12–6	1–1	Hartman Arena	1,510
3	Sunday	November 16	3:05pm	Oxford City FC of Texas^{1}	L 9–10 (SO)	1–2	Hartman Arena	885
4	Saturday	November 22	7:05pm	at Missouri Comets	L 3–13	1–3	Independence Events Center	4,242
5	Sunday	November 23	3:00pm	Dallas Sidekicks	L 2–3 (OT)	1–4	Hartman Arena	991
6	Saturday	November 29	7:05pm	at Tulsa Revolution	W 8–4	2–4	Cox Business Center	461
7	Saturday	December 6	7:05pm	Chicago Mustangs	W 8–5	3–4	Hartman Arena	1,539
8	Saturday	December 13	7:05pm	at Missouri Comets	L 3–12	3–5	Independence Events Center	3,561
9	Saturday	December 20	7:05pm	Oxford City FC of Texas	L 7–8	3–6	Hartman Arena	1,340
10	Saturday	January 3	7:30pm	at Seattle Impact	W 12–4	4–6	ShoWare Center	723
11	Sunday	January 4	4:00pm	at Seattle Impact	W 10–5	5–6	ShoWare Center	604
12	Saturday	January 10	7:05pm	St. Louis Ambush	W 7–5	6–6	Hartman Arena	2,116
13	Saturday	January 17	7:05pm	St. Louis Ambush	W 14–9	7–6	Hartman Arena	1,864
14	Saturday	January 24	7:05pm	at St. Louis Ambush	W 9–8 (OT)	8–6	Family Arena	6,027
15	Sunday	January 25	3:05pm	at Milwaukee Wave	L 4–12	8–7	UW–Milwaukee Panther Arena	2,874
16	Saturday	January 31	7:05pm	at Chicago Mustangs	L 5–8	8–8	Sears Centre	1,556
17	Saturday	February 7	7:05pm	Milwaukee Wave	L 12–14	8–9	Hartman Arena	1,957
18	Sunday	February 8	3:05pm	Missouri Comets	L 4–11	8–10	Hartman Arena	2,139
19	Saturday	February 21	7:05pm	Tulsa Revolution	W 12–6	9–10	Hartman Arena	2,458
20	Sunday	February 22	3:05pm	at Tulsa Revolution^{2}	W 22–4	10–10	Expo Square Pavilion	208

^{1} Game originally scheduled for Saturday, November 15.
^{2} Game rescheduled from December 27 due to a change in home venues.

== Awards and honors ==
In May 2014, BBC America declared the B-52s as one of "10 British Things About Wichita, Kansas".

Wichita defender Alex Moseley was selected for the 2014-15 MASL All-League Second Team.

Wichita's Abel Sebele earned honorable mention for the league's all-rookie team for 2014-15.
