= 2013–14 Wichita B-52s season =

Wichita B-52s
2013–14 PASL season
- Owner: Joseph Pindell
- Head Coach: Larry Inlow
- Arena: Hartman Arena; 8151 N. Hartman Arena Drive; Park City, Kansas 67147
- US Open Cup: Quarter-finals
- Highest home attendance: 2,025 (February vs. Dallas Sidekicks)
- Lowest home attendance: 1,482 (November 23 vs. Hidalgo La Fiera)
- Average home league attendance: 1,650 (8 games)

The 2013–14 Wichita B-52s season was the first season of the Wichita B-52s professional indoor soccer club. The Wichita B-52s, a Central Division team in the Professional Arena Soccer League, played their home games in the Hartman Arena in Wichita, Kansas. The team was led by team president Joseph Pindell and head coach Larry Inlow with assistant coach Jamie Harding and strength coach Todd Stranghoner.

== Season summary ==
The B-52 struggled through their first 4 games, beating only the Illinois Piasa and giving up 43 goals with Nic Martinez as keeper. Jason Dewey was brought in as the new primary goalkeeper and over the next six games the team beat Illinois and the expansion Tulsa Revolution for a 6–7 record so far but a sharp reduction from an average of more than 10 goals surrendered per game with Martinez to an average just over 5 with Dewey guarding the net. Wichita earned a respectable 7–9 record in its inaugural season but did not qualify for the Ron Newman Cup playoffs. The team performed well at the box office, drawing an average of 1,650 fans per game, placing them 6th in the 20-team league for average attendance.

The Wichita B-52s participated in the 2013–14 United States Open Cup for Arena Soccer, starting with a Round of 32 victory over the Denver Dynamite of the Premier Arena Soccer League on December 28, 2013, to advance. The B-52s' regular season January 25 victory over the Tulsa Revolution on January 25 served as the Round of 16 match for both clubs. Wichita hosted Chicago Mustangs on February 1 for a combined regular season and Open Cup Quarter-finals match and lost 5–10, ending Wichita's run in the tournament.

== History ==
This franchise fills a gap left when the second Wichita Wings of the Major Indoor Soccer League folded in 2013. The B-52s' team colors are based on the Wings' team colors.

== Off-field moves ==
The team's games are broadcast locally by KGSO (1410 AM, "Sports Radio 1410") and over the internet via America One Sports.

The team organized a series of holiday events for December 2013. These included players collecting for the Salvation Army on December 12, a "happy holidays" themed game against the Tulsa Revolution on December 14, plus a holiday celebration including player autographs and a visit from Santa Claus on December 16.

== Awards and honors ==
The B-52s honored Kim Røntved, a former defensive star for the original Wichita Wings, during their final regular season game on February 9. Røntved was inducted into the Indoor Soccer Hall of Fame during a halftime ceremony featuring former Wings coach Roy Turner and ISHOF Executive Director Sydney Nusinov.

== Schedule ==
Win Loss

=== Regular season ===
Game	Day	Date	Kickoff	Opponent	Results		Location	Attendance
Game	Day	Date	Kickoff	Opponent	Score	Record	Location	Attendance
1	Saturday	November 2	7:00pm	at Dallas Sidekicks	L 3–15	0–1	Allen Event Center	4,514
2	Saturday	November 9	7:05pm	Illinois Piasa	W 9–8	1–1	Hartman Arena	1,943
3	Saturday	November 16	9:05pm	at Las Vegas Legends	L 5–14	1–2	Las Vegas Sports Park	618
4	Saturday	November 23	7:05pm	Hidalgo La Fiera	L 5–6 (SO)	1–3	Hartman Arena	1,482
5	Saturday	November 30	7:35pm	at Illinois Piasa	W 8–7	2–3	The Field Sports Complex	538
6	Sunday	December 1	4:05pm	at Chicago Mustangs	L 5–9	2–4	Odeum Expo Center	627
7	Saturday	December 14	7:05pm	Tulsa Revolution	W 9–2	3–4	Hartman Arena	1,691
8	Thursday	January 2	7:30pm	at Dallas Sidekicks	L 3–6	3–5	Allen Event Center	3,429
9	Saturday	January 4♥	7:05pm	Dallas Sidekicks	L 0–6	3–6	Hartman Arena	1,255
10	Friday	January 10	7:05pm	Tulsa Revolution	W 4–2	4–6	Hartman Arena	1,424
11	Saturday	January 18	7:05pm	Illinois Piasa	W 11–5	5–6	Hartman Arena	1,826
12	Saturday	January 25	6:05pm	at Tulsa Revolution†	W 10–9	6–6	Cox Business Center	805
13	Saturday	February 1	7:05pm	Chicago Mustangs†	L 5–10	6–7	Hartman Arena	1,558
14	Friday	February 7	7:05pm	at Tulsa Revolution	L 4–6	6–8	Cox Business Center	865
15	Sunday	February 9	3:05pm	Dallas Sidekicks	L 4–5 (OT)	6–9	Hartman Arena	2,025
16	Saturday	February 15	7:35pm	at Illinois Piasa	W 6–3	7–9	The Field Sports Complex	353

† Game also counts for US Open Cup, as listed in chart below.
♥ Postponed from December 7 due to extreme winter weather

=== U.S. Open Cup for Arena Soccer ===
Game	Day	Date	Kickoff	Opponent	Results		Location	Attendance
Game	Day	Date	Kickoff	Opponent	Score	Record	Location	Attendance
Round of 32	Saturday	December 28	7:05pm	Denver Dynamite (PASL-Premier)	W 15–6	1–0	Hartman Arena	1,497
Round of 16	Saturday	January 25	6:05pm	at Tulsa Revolution	W 10–9	2–0	Cox Business Center	805
Quarter-finals	Saturday	February 1	7:05pm	Chicago Mustangs	L 5–10	2–1	Hartman Arena	1,558
