= 2014–15 Missouri Comets season =

Missouri Comets
2014–15 MASL season
- Head Coach: Vlatko Andonovski
- Arena: Independence Events Center; 19100 East Valley Parkway; Independence, Missouri
- Major Arena Soccer League: 1st, Central (regular season)
- Ron Newman Cup: Central Division Champion
- Top goalscorer: Leo Gibson (48 goals, 45 assists)
- Highest home attendance: 5,812 (November 15 vs. Milwaukee Wave)
- Lowest home attendance: 3,369 (December 5 vs. Chicago Mustangs)
- Average home league attendance: 4,487 (10 games)

The 2014–15 Missouri Comets season was the fifth season of the Missouri Comets professional indoor soccer club. The Comets, a Central Division team in the Major Arena Soccer League, played their home games in the Independence Events Center in Independence, Missouri.

The team was led by head coach Vlatko Andonovski. The Comets amassed a perfect 20–0 record in the regular season and earned a bye to the second round of the MASL playoffs. They defeated the Milwaukee Wave to earn the Central Division title but lost to the Baltimore Blast in the Eastern Conference Championship. Andonovski was honored as the MASL's Coach of the Year and forward Leo Gibson as the MASL's Most Valuable Player.

== Season summary ==
The Comets entered the MASL as the final champion of the third incarnation of the MISL. They demonstrated the value of continuity by romping over the Dallas Sidekicks and PASL champion Chicago Mustangs to open the season. Indeed, the only close games the Comets played on their way to a 20-game undefeated season came against the Milwaukee Wave (who finished just two goals down at the Independence Events Center and took the Comets to a shootout at UW–Milwaukee Panther Arena) and the Monterrey Flash (who took them to overtime at Arena Monterrey). The Comets wound up first in the Central Division and defeated the Milwaukee Wave in the Central Division Final. They played a best-of-three series with the Baltimore Blast for the Eastern Conference Championship and lost on the road then at home, ending their playoff run.

== History ==
Launched as an expansion team in the third Major Indoor Soccer League for the 2010–11 season, the Comets have the same ownership group as FC Kansas City of the National Women's Soccer League. Head coach Vlatko Andonovski is also manager of the women's club. The team is named after the Kansas City Comets, who played in the original Major Indoor Soccer League from 1981 to 1991.

In all four seasons as members of the MISL, the Comets reached the playoffs. They won the league championship on their fourth playoff appearance. This would be the final MISL championship. After the 2013–14 season, the team announced that it was leaving the MISL along with five other teams and join the teams of Professional Arena Soccer League, which was soon rebranded as the MASL. The other teams in the Central Division are former MISL clubs Milwaukee Wave and St. Louis Ambush, plus PASL clubs Chicago Mustangs, Tulsa Revolution, and Wichita B-52s.

== Off-field moves ==
On November 6, the Comets and FC Kansas City of the National Women's Soccer League each signed head coach Vlatko Andonovski to three-year extensions of their respective contracts. Andonovski led both teams to league championships in 2014.

For the January 30 game against the Chicago Mustangs, the Comets wore special gold jerseys as part of a "Go for the Gold for Pediatric Cancer" charity effort to benefit the Dalton Everett Burner Foundation. The foundation, named for a local youth who overcame a rare form of cancer, assists families dealing with pediatric cancer. Fundraisers included a raffle and an auction of that night's game-worn jerseys.

After the Eastern Conference Championship match on March 15 in which several Missouri players were red carded for misconduct, Comets forward Andre Braithwaite headbutted Baltimore Blast player Pat Healey, opening a gash in Healey's forehead that required five stitches to close. Braithwaite was immediately released by the Comets and will face league disciplinary action.

== Schedule ==
Win Loss

=== Regular season ===
| Game | Day | Date | Kickoff | Opponent | Results | | Location | Attendance |
| Game | Day | Date | Kickoff | Opponent | Score | Record | Location | Attendance |
|---|---|---|---|---|---|---|---|---|
| 1 | Saturday | October 25 | 7:05 p.m. | at Dallas Sidekicks | W 13–4 | 1–0 | Allen Event Center | 4,008 |
| 2 | Saturday | November 8 | 7:05 p.m. | at Chicago Mustangs | W 12–6 | 2–0 | Sears Centre | 2,483 |
| 3 | Saturday | November 15 | 7:05 p.m. | Milwaukee Wave | W 9–7 | 3–0 | Independence Events Center | 5,812 |
| 4 | Saturday | November 22 | 7:05 p.m. | Wichita B-52s | W 13–3 | 4–0 | Independence Events Center | 4,242 |
| 5 | Saturday | November 29 | 7:05 p.m. | at Harrisburg Heat♠ | W 24–10 | 5–0 | Farm Show Large Arena | 2,518 |
| 6 | Friday | December 5 | 7:35 p.m. | Chicago Mustangs | W 15–6 | 6–0 | Independence Events Center | 3,369 |
| 7 | Saturday | December 6 | 7:05 p.m. | at Tulsa Revolution | W 15–5 | 7–0 | Cox Business Center | 506 |
| 8 | Saturday | December 13 | 7:05 p.m. | Wichita B-52s | W 12–3 | 8–0 | Independence Events Center | 3,561 |
| 9 | Saturday | December 27 | 7:05 p.m. | San Diego Sockers | W 10–7 | 9–0 | Independence Events Center | 4,218 |
| 10 | Wednesday | December 31 | 3:05 p.m. | at Milwaukee Wave | W 8–7 (SO) | 10–0 | UW–Milwaukee Panther Arena | 3,148 |
| 11 | Saturday | January 3 | 7:05 p.m. | at St. Louis Ambush | W 8–5 | 11–0 | Family Arena | 7,360 |
| 12 | Saturday | January 10 | 7:05 p.m. | Tulsa Revolution | W 18–2 | 12–0 | Independence Events Center | 4,476 |
| 13 | Friday | January 16 | 7:35 p.m. | St. Louis Ambush | W 7–5 | 13–0 | Independence Events Center | 4,587 |
| 14 | Friday | January 23 | 7:35 p.m. | at Saltillo Rancho Seco | W 14–8 | 14–0 | Deportivo Rancho-Seco Saltillo | ? |
| 15 | Sunday | January 25 | 5:05 p.m. | at Monterrey Flash | W 8–7 (OT) | 15–0 | Arena Monterrey | 5,327 |
| 16 | Friday | January 30 | 7:35 p.m. | Chicago Mustangs | W 7–2 | 16–0 | Independence Events Center | 5,355 |
| 17 | Friday | February 6 | 7:35 p.m. | at St. Louis Ambush | W 10–5 | 17–0 | Family Arena | 6,989 |
| 18 | Sunday | February 8 | 3:05 p.m. | at Wichita B-52s | W 11–4 | 18–0 | Hartman Arena | 2,139 |
| 19 | Saturday | February 14 | 7:05 p.m. | Tulsa Revolution | W 21–4 | 19–0 | Independence Events Center | 4,414 |
| 20 | Sunday | February 22 | 3:05 p.m. | Tacoma Stars^{1} | W 17–1 | 20–0 | Independence Events Center | 4,843 |

♠ Game played with multi-point scoring (most goals worth 2 points and select goals worth 3 points).
^{1} Seattle Impact shut down mid-season; franchise purchased by Tacoma Stars

=== Post-season ===
| Game | Day | Date | Kickoff | Opponent | Results | | Location | Attendance |
| Game | Day | Date | Kickoff | Opponent | Score | Record | Location | Attendance |
|---|---|---|---|---|---|---|---|---|
| Division Final | Thursday | March 12 | 7:05 p.m. | Milwaukee Wave | W 8–2 | 1–0 | Independence Events Center | 3,441 |
| Eastern Final #1 | Friday | March 13 | 7:35 p.m. | at Baltimore Blast♠ | L 4–6 | 1–1 | Royal Farms Arena | 4,562 |
| Eastern Final #2 | Sunday | March 15 | 3:05 p.m. | Baltimore Blast | L 7–10 | 1–2 | Independence Events Center | 3,862 |

== Awards and honors ==
Missouri defenders John Sosa and Brian Harris, midfielder Vahid Assadpour, and forward Leo Gibson were selected for the 2014–15 MASL All-League First Team. Goalkeeper Danny Waltman was selected for the All-League Second Team. Missouri defender Alain Matingou was named to the league's all-rookie team for 2014–15. Missouri's Josh Gardner earned honorable mention for the all-rookie team.

On March 13, the MASL announced the finalists for its major year-end awards. These nominees included Missouri forward Leo Gibson for Most Valuable Player, Danny Waltman for Goalkeeper of the Year, Brian Harris and John Sosa for Defender of the Year, and Vlatko Andonovski for Coach of the Year. On March 19, the league announced that voters selected Gibson as the MASL's Most Valuable Player and Andonovski as Coach of the Year.
