= Major Arena Soccer League 2 =

North American indoor soccer league

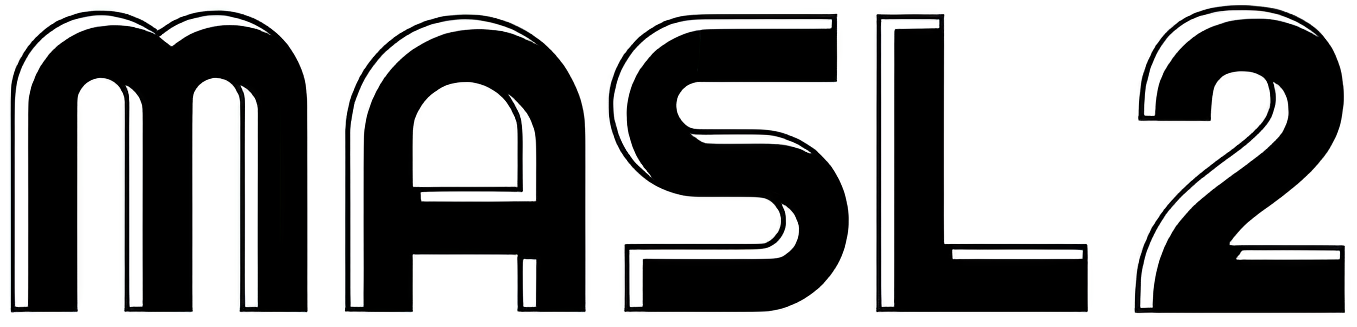
- Founded: 2017
- Country: United States
- Other club from: Mexico
- Number of clubs: 17
- Level on pyramid: 2
- Current champions: Harrisburg Heat (2025–26)
- Most championships: Chihuahua Savage 2 (three titles)
- Website: www.m2soccer.com

The Major Arena Soccer League 2 (MASL 2) is a North American indoor soccer league that serves as the developmental league of the Major Arena Soccer League.

== History ==
MASL 2 launched in 2017 to "provide an outlet for teams to either reorganize for a re-emergence in the MASL or an avenue for teams to compete in smaller markets in hopes of rising to MASL status". It was announced that MASL 2 would have between 8 and 12 teams.

The 2018–19 season brought the total number of teams participating in the season up from 10 to 15. Stockton, California, was announced as a market and held a team naming contest, but all news stories from the league website and all mention of the Stockton franchised were dropped. The league changed from having "Conferences" to "Divisions." Expanding from the Eastern and Western conference's the MASL 2 now had the Eastern Division, Mountain Division, and Pacific Division.

On February 25, 2021, MASL 2 announced the return of the RGV Barracudas FC to the league to compete in the 2021–2022 season.

On March 11, 2021, MASL 2 officially welcomed the Cleveland Crunch to the league.

Due to scheduling conflicts with their new home at Hersheypark Arena, the Harrisburg Heat were forced to play in MASL2 for the 2025–26 season. They plan to return to the Major Arena Soccer League (MASL) for the 2026–27 season. The Heat went undefeated for the 2025–26 season, winning its first-ever championship title in the MASL2.

On May 15, 2026, the Chihuahua Savage reformed and joined the MASL2 to form future development, and a potential Mexican division or league. On June 3rd, 2026 it was announced a new franchise in Ocean City, Maryland would be joining for the 2026-2027 season. The team will be known as Beachtown FC.

On September 28, 2026, the Chicago Mustangs joined the league from the MLIS.

== Sponsorship ==
The official game ball is made by Voit, based in Mexico City, Mexico.

== Teams ==
Division	Team	Location	Arena	Capacity	Joined	Coach	MASL Affiliate
East Division	FC Baltimore 1729	Towson, Maryland	SECU Arena	3,580	2025	Cameron Schnaack	Baltimore Blast
East Division	Beachtown FC	Ocean City, Maryland	Roland E. Powell Convention Center	5,000	2026	Ron Dawson	
East Division	Harrisburg Heat	Hershey, Pennsylvania	Hersheypark Arena	7,286	2025	Hugo de Silva	
East Division	Spice City FC	Danbury, Connecticut	Danbury Ice Arena	2,500	2024	Onua Obasi	
Midwest Division	Certified Lions FC	Oklahoma City, Oklahoma	OG&E Coliseum	7,500	2024	Thomas Siranga	
Midwest Division	Chicago Mustangs	Hoffman Estates, Illinois	Grand Sports Arena	200	2026	Armando Gamboa	
Midwest Division	Iowa Demon Hawks	Urbandale, Iowa	SIG SportsPlex	700	2022	Francisco Fernandes, Jr.	
Midwest Division	Iowa Raptors FC	Cedar Rapids, Iowa	Alliant Energy PowerHouse	9,000	2022	Carlos Taylor	
Midwest Division	Texas Spurs	Allen, Texas	TOCA Soccer and Sports Center Allen	150	2025	Ed Puskarich	
West Division	Chihuahua Savage	Chihuahua, Chihuahua	Arena Corner Sport	2,000	2026	Jamie Borrego	
West Division	Gricks TJ	Tijuana, Mexico	Cancha Furati	200	2026	Dew Jones Jr	
West Division	Guadalajara Mariachis FC	Guadalajara, Mexico	Gimnasio San Rafael	1,541	2025	TBA	
West Division	Soccer Central SC	Watsonville, California	Soccer Central Indoor Sports	200	2025	Javier Francisco	
West Division	Soles de Sonora	Hermosillo, Mexico	Gimnasio Unison	2,300	2025	Julio Garcia	
West Division	Turlock Cal Express	Turlock, California	Turlock Soccer Complex	700	2021	Arturo Pulido	

=== Inactive teams ===
Team	Location	Arena	Capacity	Joined	Coach	MASL Affiliate
Mexico City Asuncion	Mexico City, Mexico	Gimnasio Olímpico Juan de la Barrera	5,242	2025	Genoni Martinez	
Minnesota Blizzard	Falcon Heights, Minnesota	Warner Coliseum	5,000		Chad Hendricks	Kansas City Comets
Omaha Kings	Omaha, Nebraska	Baxter Arena	7,898	2025	Emmanuel Viel	
United Elite Krasjisnick FC	Utica, New York	NBT Bank Arena at the Utica Memorial Auditorium	3,999		Bogdan Yatsishin	Utica City FC
Wichita Wings	Park City, Kansas	Park City Arena	5,000	2019	Roger Downing	

== Champions ==
Overview of Major Arena Soccer League 2 champions
Season	Champions	Runner-up	Score	Host
2017–18	Chicago Mustangs	San Diego Sockers 2	7–0	Colorado Springs, Colorado
2018–19	San Diego Sockers 2	Cuervos de Juarez	7–5	Ontario, California
2019–20	Chihuahua Savage II	Wichita Wings		Playoffs cancelled due to COVID-19
2020–21	Cleveland Crunch	Wichita Wings	11–6	Wichita, Kansas
2021–22	San Diego Sockers 2	Cleveland Crunch	7–4	Muskegon, Michigan
2022–23	Chihuahua Savage II	Iowa Raptors FC	10–4	Mesquite, Texas
2023–24	Iowa Demon Hawks	Rochester Lancers	8–3	Wichita, Kansas
2024–25	Chihuahua Savage II	Iowa Demon Hawks	8–7	Urbandale, Iowa
2025–26	Harrisburg Heat	Iowa Demon Hawks	9–8	Omaha, Nebraska
