= 2021 Major Arena Soccer League 2 season =

Major Arena Soccer League 2
- Season: 2021

The 2021 Major Arena Soccer League 2 season is the fourth season for the league also known as M2. The regular season started on January 22, 2021, and ended on July 11, 2021, due to the COVID-19 pandemic.

The Major Arena Soccer League signed an agreement with Arena Soccer Group, LLC (ASG) to take over the management of M2 on October 24, 2019.

== Changes from 2019–20 ==
=== Expansion ===
Two teams joined in the 2021 season.

- Cleveland Crunch
- Omaha Kings

=== Returned ===
- Chicago Mustangs

=== Provisional schedule ===
- Muskegon Risers

=== Left or not competing due to COVID-19 ===
- Chihuahua Savage
- Wichita Falls Flyers FC
- Austin Power FC
- New Mexico Runners
- Colorado Rumble

== Standings ==
As of July 12, 2021
2021 League Championship
2021 Playoff Team
(Bold) Division Winner

Place	Team	GP	W	L	Pct	GF	GA	GB
Mountain Division
1	Wichita Wings	11	8	3	.727	81	71	0
2	Cleveland Crunch	10	7	3	.700	94	56	0.5
3	FC Amarillo Bombers	11	6	5	.545	80	85	2
4	Chicago Mustangs	10	5	5	.500	81	86	2.5
5	Omaha Kings	14	6	8	.429	103	114	3.5
6	Colorado Inferno F.C.	16	4	12	.250	119	145	6.5
Provisional Teams
*	Muskegon Risers	3	2	1	.667	22	21	

== Invitationals ==
The winners of three invitational tournaments will provide three of the four playoff spots, while the best remaining overall team in the standings will provide the final spot. Matches played in these tournaments also count towards the regular season standings.
2021 League Championship
2021 Playoff Team
(Bold) Division Winner

Place	Team	GP	W	L	Pct	GF	GA	GB
Rocky Mountain Invitational
1	Wichita Wings	3	3	0	.667	21	10	0
2	Omaha Kings	3	1	2	.333	23	25	2
3	FC Amarillo Bombers	3	1	2	.333	18	21	2
4	Colorado Inferno F.C.	3	1	2	.333	16	22	2
Heartland Invitational
1	FC Amarillo Bombers	2	2	0	1.000	18	14	0
2	Colorado Inferno F.C.	2	1	1	.500	17	14	1
3	Omaha Kings	2	0	2	.000	11	18	2
Great Lakes Invitational
1	Cleveland Crunch	3	3	0	1.000	32	12	0
2	Chicago Mustangs	3	1	2	.333	18	30	2
3	Colorado Inferno F.C.	3	0	3	.000	18	27	3

== Playoffs ==
The MASL 2 Playoffs were played in Wichita, Kansas, on July 17–18, 2021.

Semifinals
1	Wichita Wings	7
4	Chicago Mustangs	1
2	Cleveland Crunch	12
3	FC Amarillo Bombers	6

Finals
1	Wichita Wings	6
2	Cleveland Crunch	11

=== July 17, 2021: Semifinals ===
- 3:00 pm - Cleveland Crunch 12, FC Amarillo Bombers 6
- 7:00 pm - Wichita Wings 7, Chicago Mustangs 1

=== July 18, 2021: Championship final ===
- 5:00 pm - Cleveland Crunch 11, Wichita Wings 6
