= Vlatko Andonovski =

Macedonian-American soccer manager and former player

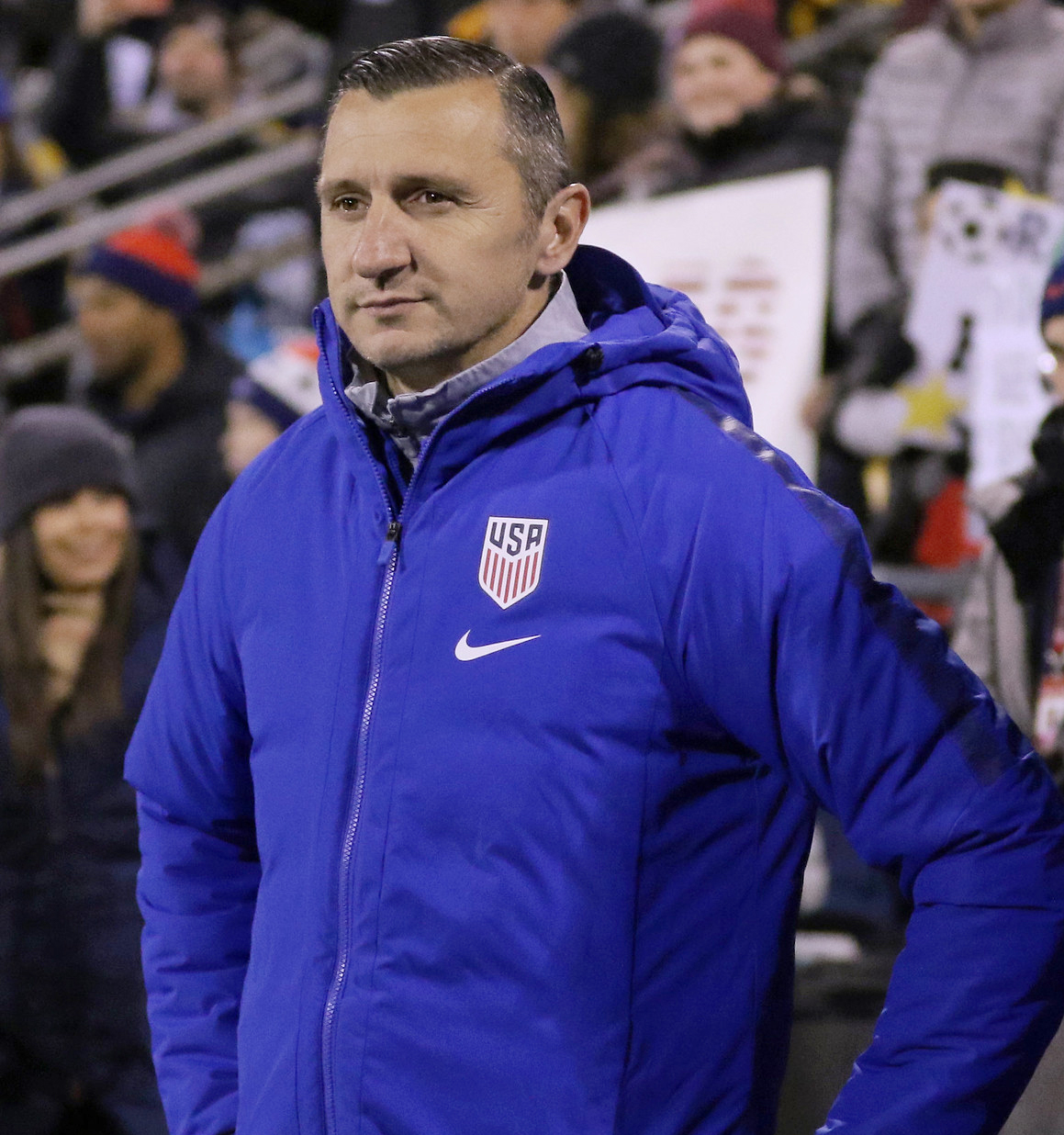
- Andonovski with the U.S. women's national team in 2019

Personal information
- Full name: Vlatko Andonovski
- Date of birth: 14 September 1976 (age 50)
- Place of birth: Skopje, SFR Yugoslavia
- Height: 1.85 m (6 ft 1 in)
- Position: Central defender

Senior career*
Years	Team	Apps	(Gls)
- FK Rabotnički
- Makedonija GP
- Vardar
2000	Wichita Wings (indoor)	31	(16)
2001–2005	Kansas City Comets (indoor)	110	(48)
2005	California Cougars (indoor)	6	(1)
2005–2006	Philadelphia KiXX (indoor)	13	(2)
2015	Missouri Comets (indoor)	1	(0)

Managerial career
- 2010–2013: Missouri Comets (assistant)
- 2013–2016: Missouri Comets
- 2013–2017: FC Kansas City
- 2018–2019: Reign FC
- 2019–2023: United States (women)
- 2023–2025: Kansas City Current
- 2025–2026: Kansas City Current (sporting director)
- 2026–: Chicago Stars FC (Chief Soccer Officer)
- * Club domestic league appearances and goals

Vlatko Andonovski (Macedonian: Влатко Андоновски; born 14 September 1976) is a Macedonian-American association football manager and former player who is the Chief Soccer Officer of Chicago Stars FC in the National Women's Soccer League (NWSL). He was the head coach of the United States women's national team from 2019 to 2023.

Andonovski previously coached the NWSL's FC Kansas City, Reign FC, and Kansas City Current, as well as the Missouri Comets in the Major Arena Soccer League. He also served as the Kansas City Current's sporting director from 2025 to 2026.

== Playing career ==
A central defender, Andonovski played six seasons for multiple clubs in Europe, such as FK Rabotnički, Makedonija GP and FK Vardar, competing in the First Macedonian Football League, European Cup and Intertoto Cup.

In 2000, Andonovski signed with the Wichita Wings of the National Professional Soccer League and later played for the Kansas City Comets, California Cougars and Philadelphia Kixx of the Major Indoor Soccer League in his indoor career.

On 8 February 2015, Andonovski and Wichita B-52s coach Kim Røntved came out of retirement to play against each other for their respective teams for one game.

== Managerial career ==
On 5 December 2012, Andonovski signed a contract to become the head coach of FC Kansas City. He was hired as the head coach of Kansas City Comets on 29 August 2013, after being an assistant under Kim Røntved for three seasons. During the 2014 year of both programs, Andonovski won both the MISL Championship with the Comets and the NWSL Championship with FC Kansas City.

On 7 November 2017, Andonovski moved to Seattle Reign FC, succeeding Laura Harvey as head coach. During his tenure with the team, it moved from Seattle to Tacoma, Washington after the 2018 season and rebranded itself as Reign FC; it would rebrand again in 2020 as OL Reign.

Andonovski holds a USSF Pro License and a United Soccer Coaches (formerly NSCAA) Goalkeeping Diploma and has been involved with many youth teams and clubs in the Kansas City area.

Andonovski received significant praise from media and players alike for his role in the Reign's 2019 season. Despite losing a significant number of players to various injuries and the 2019 FIFA Women's World Cup, Andonovski managed the team to a 4th-place finish in the NWSL and a second straight playoff berth.

Andonovski was named the head coach of the United States women's national team on 28 October 2019.

Andonovski led the United States to a bronze medal in the 2020 Summer Olympics, which was criticized by some observers as an underperformance from a team which had won four previous Olympic gold medals. He remained with the team through the 2023 FIFA Women's World Cup, at which the U.S. was eliminated in a penalty shootout against Sweden in the round of 16, which was the team's earliest exit in a World Cup. Less than two weeks later, on August 16, Andonovski resigned as head coach.

On 23 October 2023, Andonovski returned to the NWSL as he was hired as head coach and sporting director of the Kansas City Current.

On 10 November 2025, after the Current's history-making regular season—during which the team won the NWSL Shield, finishing with a record 21 wins and a record 65 points—Andonovski was named a finalist for NWSL Coach of the Year award. Four days later, it was announced that Andonovksi would be stepping away from his role as head coach to become solely the club’s sporting director.

On 7 September 2026, Andonovski and the Current mutually terminated his contract. Chicago Stars FC, which at the time was the NWSL's last-place team, subsequently announced Andonovski's hiring as its chief soccer officer on 17 September.

== Personal life ==
Andonovski was born in Skopje, SR Macedonia, SFR Yugoslavia (now North Macedonia), and became a U.S. citizen in 2015. He is a 2008 graduate of Park University with a Bachelor of Arts in business administration/management. He earned a Master's in Soccer Coaching Education (MSC) from Ohio University in 2017. Andonovski resides in Kansas City, Missouri, with his wife, Biljana, and their three children.

== Managerial statistics ==
As of 9 November 2025

Team	Nat	Year	Record				
Team	Nat	Year	G	W	L	T	Win %
FC Kansas City	(United States)	2013–2017 (Note: Statistics include NWSL Playoffs; see club page for further information.)	91	43	28	20	47.25
Kansas City Comets	(United States)	2013–2016 (Note: See club page for further information.)	73	58	15	0	79.45
Reign FC (Note: This club was known as Seattle Reign FC in the 2018 season.)	(United States)	2018–2019 (Note: Statistics exclude NWSL Playoffs; see club page for further information.)	48	21	11	16	43.75
United States (women)	(United States)	2019–2023	65	51	5	9	78.46
Kansas City Current	(United States)	2023–2025 (Note: Statistics exclude NWSL Playoffs; see club page for further information.)	52	37	9	6	71.15
Career Total			288	180	63	45	62.50

== Honors ==
=== Playing ===
Individual

- MISL Most Valuable Player: 2005
- MISL Defender of the Year: 2002
- MISL Most Improved Player: 2002
- MISL All-Star: 2-time

=== Coaching ===
High School / Youth

- Missouri State Championship: 4-time
- Youth National Championship: 1-time KCFC-Futura Academy ECNL

Kansas City Comets

- Major Indoor Soccer League: 2013–14

FC Kansas City

- NWSL Championship: 2014, 2015

United States

- CONCACAF Women's Championship: 2022
- Olympic Bronze Medal: 2020
- SheBelieves Cup: 2020, 2021, 2022, 2023

Individual

- Major Arena Soccer League Coach of the Year: 2014–15
- NWSL Coach of the Year: 2013, 2019
