= 2012–13 United States Open Cup for Arena Soccer =

US Open Arena Soccer Championship
- Season: 2012–13
- Champions: Detroit Waza
- Highest scoring: 23 - Chicago Mustangs 15, Illinois Piasa 8; Round of 16
- Longest unbeaten run: 7 - Cincinnati Saints

The 2012–13 US Open Arena Soccer Championship is the fifth edition of an open knockout style tournament for arena/indoor soccer. In this edition, teams from the Professional Arena Soccer League, Premier Arena Soccer League, and other independent indoor soccer teams participate in the tournament.

== US Open Arena Soccer Championship Bracket ==
Wild Card Round
Ind	(Pennsylvania) Real Harrisburg	3
Ind	(Pennsylvania) Harrisburg United	1
PASL	(Pennsylvania) Harrisburg Heat
BYE
PASL	(Michigan) Detroit Waza
BYE
PASL	Ohio Vortex
BYE
PASL	(Illinois) Chicago Mustangs	8
PASL	(Illinois) Rockford Rampage	7
PASL	Illinois Piasa
BYE
PASLP	(Ohio) Cincinnati Saints
Indiana FC Tournament
PASLP	(Kentucky) River City Legends
Hoosier Cup
PASLP	(Nevada) Las Vegas Knights
Las Vegas Tournament
PASL	(California) Turlock Express	9
PASL	(California) Sacramento Surge	6
PASL	Arizona Storm	3
PASL	(California) San Diego Sockers	18
PASL	(California) Anaheim Bolts
BYE
PASL	(Washington (state)) Tacoma Stars
BYE
PASLP	Oregon Blacktails
Northwest Tournament
PASL	(Nevada) Las Vegas Legends	10
PASL	(Arizona) Real Phoenix	4
PASLP	(Colorado) Denver Dynamite	7
PASLP	(Colorado) CSC Cavalry	12

Round of 16
Ind	(Pennsylvania) Real Harrisburg	8
PASL	(Pennsylvania) Harrisburg Heat	11
PASL	(Michigan) Detroit Waza	13
PASL	Ohio Vortex	3
PASL	(Illinois) Chicago Mustangs	15
PASL	Illinois Piasa	8
PASLP	(Ohio) Cincinnati Saints	12
PASLP	(Kentucky) River City Legends	1
PASLP	(Nevada) Las Vegas Knights	10
PASL	(California) Turlock Express	11 (OT)
PASL	(California) San Diego Sockers	14
PASL	(California) Anaheim Bolts	3
PASL	(Washington (state)) Tacoma Stars	12
PASLP	Oregon Blacktails	2
PASL	(Nevada) Las Vegas Legends	18
PASLP	(Colorado) CSC Cavalry	3

Quarterfinals
PASL	(Pennsylvania) Harrisburg Heat	4
PASL	(Michigan) Detroit Waza	8
PASL	(Illinois) Chicago Mustangs	10
PASLP	(Ohio) Cincinnati Saints	7
PASL	(California) Turlock Express	7
PASL	(California) San Diego Sockers	11
PASL	(Washington (state)) Tacoma Stars	6
PASL	(Nevada) Las Vegas Legends	15

Semifinals
PASL	(Michigan) Detroit Waza	9
PASL	(Illinois) Chicago Mustangs	6
PASL	(California) San Diego Sockers	6
PASL	(Nevada) Las Vegas Legends	5

Final
PASL	(Michigan) Detroit Waza	7
PASL	(California) San Diego Sockers	6

== Confirmed dates and matchups ==
All times local
† Game doubles as regular season match

=== Wild Card round ===
- Sat. Nov. 17th, 7:05pm - San Diego Sockers (PASL) 18, Arizona Storm (PASL) 3 †
- Sat. Dec. 1st, 8:00pm - CSC Cavalry (PASL-Premier) 12, Denver Dynamite (PASL-Premier) 7
- Sat. Dec. 1st, 5:30pm - Chicago Mustangs (PASL) 8, Rockford Rampage (PASL) 7
- Fri. Dec. 14th - Anaheim Bolts (PASL) - Rescheduled as a Bye
- Sat. Dec. 15th, 7:00pm - Las Vegas Legends (PASL) 10, Real Phoenix (PASL) 4 †
- Fri. Dec. 21st, 7:00pm - Turlock Express (PASL) 9, Sacramento Surge (PASL) 6 †
- Fri. Dec. 29th - Real Harrisburg (Independent) 3, Harrisburg United (Independent) 1

=== Round of 16 ===
- Sun. Dec. 2nd - Tacoma Stars (PASL) 12, Oregon Blacktails (PASL-Premier) 2
- Sat. Dec. 8th, 7:35pm - Detroit Waza (PASL) 13, Ohio Vortex (PASL) 3 †
- Sat. Dec. 15th, 5:30pm - Chicago Mustangs (PASL) 15, Illinois Piasa (PASL) 8 †
- Sat. Dec. 15th, 7:00pm - Cincinnati Saints (PASL-Premier) 12, River City Legends (PASL-Premier) 1 †
- Sat. Dec. 22nd, 7:05pm - San Diego Sockers (PASL) 14, Anaheim Bolts (PASL) 3 †
- Fri. Dec. 28th, 5:30pm - Turlock Express (PASL) 11, Las Vegas Knights (PASL-Premier) 10 (OT)
- Fri. Dec. 28th, 7:00pm - Las Vegas Legends (PASL) 18, CSC Cavalry (PASL-Premier) 3
- Fri. Jan. 4th, 7:30pm - Harrisburg Heat (PASL) 11, Real Harrisburg (Independent) 8

=== Quarterfinals ===
- Fri. Jan. 4th, 7:00pm - Las Vegas Legends (PASL) 15, Tacoma Stars (PASL) 6 †
- Sat. Jan. 5th, 7:05pm - San Diego Sockers (PASL) 11, Turlock Express (PASL) 7 †
- Sat. Jan. 12th, 7:30pm - Detroit Waza (PASL) 8, Harrisburg Heat (PASL) 4 †
- Sun. Jan. 20th, 5:00pm - Chicago Mustangs (PASL) 10, Cincinnati Saints (PASL-Premier) 7

=== Semifinals ===
- Fri. Jan 18th, 7:00pm - San Diego Sockers (PASL) 6, Las Vegas Legends (PASL) 5 †
- Sun. Jan 27th, 4:30pm - Detroit Waza (PASL) 9, Chicago Mustangs (PASL) 6 †

=== Championship ===
- Sat. Mar. 2nd, 7:35pm - Detroit Waza (PASL) 7, San Diego Sockers (PASL) 6 (at Melvindale Ice Arena)

== Qualifying ==
- Green indicates qualification for Qualifying Tournament Knockout Round(s)
- Bold Indicates Qualifying Tournament Winner and qualification to US Arena Open Cup
- All times local

Place	Team	W	L	T	GF	GA	Points
US Open Cup – Arena Soccer Qualifiers (Lafayette Qualifier) - Group A Standings (@ Lafayette, IN)
1	FC Indiana (PASL-Premier)	3	0	0	13	2	9
2	Indiana University (University)	2	1	0	20	10	6
3	Purdue University (University)	1	2	0	9	15	3
4	Chargers FC (University)	0	3	0	3	18	0
US Open Cup – Arena Soccer Qualifiers (Lafayette Qualifying) - Group B Standings (@ Lafayette, IN)
1	Cincinnati Saints (PASL-Premier)	3	0	0	15	8	9
2	Fort Wayne Sport Club (MWSL)	1	1	1	11	12	4
3	AAFC (Independent)	0	1	2	12	13	2
4	San Luis FC (Independent)	0	2	1	9	14	1

US Open Cup - Arena Soccer Qualifiers

Saturday, November 3, 2012

- Group Play
  - Group A
    - 8:00 am - FC Indiana 3, Purdue University 0
    - 9:00 am - Indiana University 8, Chargers FC 1
  - Group B
    - 10:00 am Cincinnati Saints 4, A.A.F.C 3
    - 11:00 am - Fort Wayne Sport Club 4, San Luis FC 2
  - Group A
    - 12:00 pm - Indiana University 2, FC Indiana 6
    - 1:00 pm - Chargers FC 2, Purdue University 6
  - Group B
    - 2:00 pm - Fort Wayne Sport Club 2, Cincinnati Saints 5
    - 3:00 pm - San Luis FC 4, A.A.F.C. 4
  - Group A
    - 4:00 pm - Purdue University 3, Indiana University 10
    - 5:00 pm - FC Indiana 4, Chargers FC 0
  - Group B
    - 6:00 pm - A.A.F.C 5, Fort Wayne Sport Club 5
    - 7:00 pm - Cincinnati Saints 6, San Luis FC 3

Sunday, November 4, 2012

- Elimination Round
  - 8:00 am - FC Indiana 3, San Luis FC 5
  - 9:00 am - A.A.F.C. 3, Indiana University 2
  - 10:00 am - Cincinnati Saints 3, Chargers FC 0
  - 11:00 am - Fort Wayne Sports Club 8, Purdue University 3
- Semi-Finals
  - 12:00 pm - San Luis FC 4, A.A.F.C. 5
  - 1:00 pm - Cincinnati Saints 4, Fort Wayne Sport Club 3
- Championship Final
  - 3:00 pm - Cincinnati Saints 5, A.A.F.C. 3

Cincinnati Saints Qualify for US Arena Open Cup.

Place	Team	W	L	T	GF	GA	Points
Hoosier Cup (Evansville Qualifying) - Group A Standings (@ Evansville, IN)
1	Los Bravos (Independent)	1	1	0	11	9	3
2	Evansville Crush (PASL-Premier)	1	1	0	9	9	3
3	Cincinnati Saints (PASL-Premier)	1	1	0	7	9	3
Hoosier Cup (Evansville Qualifying) - Group B Standings (@ Evansville, IN)
1	Paducah Premier (PASL-Premier)	2	0	0	7	3	6
2	River City Legends (PASL-Premier)	1	1	0	5	4	3
3	Indy Elite FC (PASL-Premier)	0	2	0	4	9	0

Group Matches: Sat. Nov. 10, 2012

- 10:00am - Los Bravos 7, Evansville Crush 4
- 12:00pm - River City Legends 4, Indy Elite FC 2
- 1:00pm - Evansville Crush 5, Cincinnati Saints 2
- 2:00pm - Paducah Premier 2, River City Legends 1
- 3:00pm - Cincinnati Saints 5, Los Bravos 4
- 4:00pm - Paducah Premier 5, Indy Elite FC 2

5th Place: Sat. Nov. 10, 2012

- 5:00pm - Cincinnati Saints v. Indy Elite FC

Semifinals: Sat. Nov. 10, 2012

- 6:00pm - River City Legends 7, Los Bravos 1
- 7:00pm - Paducah Premier 4, Evansville Crush 3

Finals: Sat. Nov. 10, 2012

- 8:00pm - River City Legends 3, Paducah Premier 0 (forfeit)

River City Legends qualify for US Arena Open Cup

Rocky Mountain Qualifying - Sat. Dec. 1, 2012 (@ Monument, CO)

Final; 8:00pm
PASL-Premier	(Colorado) Denver Dynamite	7
PASL-Premier	(Colorado) CSC Cavalry	12

CSC Cavalry qualify for US Arena Open Cup

Harrisburg Qualifying - Sat. Dec. 29, 2012 (@ Harrisburg, PA)

Final
Independent	(Pennsylvania) Real Harrisburg	3
Independent	(Pennsylvania) Harrisburg United	1

Real Harrisburg qualify for US Arena Open Cup
