= Wichita Wings (2019) =

- Founded: 2019
- Ground: Hartman Arena
- Capacity: 6,500
- Head Coach: LeBaron Holliman
- League: Major Arena Soccer League 2
- Website: https://www.wichitawingssoccer.com

The Wichita Wings are a professional arena soccer team based in Wichita, Kansas. They are current members of Major Arena Soccer League 2 and began play in 2019. They also have a developmental semi-professional team, the Wichita Wings 2, who currently play in Major Arena Soccer League 3. They play their home games at Hartman Arena in Park City, Kansas.

== History ==
In October 2019, the Wichita Wings were announced as an expansion franchise in the Major Arena Soccer League 2. They will honor the legacy of previous indoor soccer franchises in the area: the original Wichita Wings of the MISL and NPSL, the second Wichita Wings from the third version of the Major Indoor Soccer League, and the Wichita B-52s of the Professional Arena Soccer League/Major Arena Soccer League. They played eight home games in its first season, then moved to M2 the following season. On November 4th, 2025, head coach Roger Downing stepped down, and the following day, the Wings announced that LeBaron Holliman, who played for the original incarnation of the Wings, was announced as the new head coach.
