= 2012–13 Chicago Mustangs season =

Chicago Mustangs
2012–13 PASL season
- Owner/CEO: Armando Gamboa
- Head Coach: Narciso "Chicho" Cuevas (games 1–13); Armando Gamboa (games 14–16)
- Arena: Grand Sports Arena; Hoffman Estates, Illinois
- PASL: 3rd, Central
- US Open Cup: Semi-finals
- Average home league attendance: 339 (over 8 home games)

The 2012–13 Chicago Mustangs season was the first season of the new Chicago Mustangs professional indoor soccer club. The Mustangs, a Central Division team in the Professional Arena Soccer League, played their home games in the Grand Sports Arena in Hoffman Estates, Illinois. Nasser Rafidia was the team's general manager. Narciso "Chicho" Cuevas served as head coach until late January 2013 when owner Armando Gamboa assumed the role with Thomas Cahue as his assistant coach.

== Season summary ==
The Mustangs were successful in the regular season, finishing 11–5, but failed to qualify for the postseason in the tough Central Division. The team fared better at home than on the road, winning 7 of 8 home games but splitting the road games with 4 wins and 4 losses. A coaching change late in the season was followed by the team dropping 2 of its 3 final matches.

The Mustangs participated in the 2012–13 United States Open Cup for Arena Soccer. They defeated the Rockford Rampage in the wild-card round, the Illinois Piasa in the Round of 16, and the Cincinnati Saints of the Premier Arena Soccer League in the Quarter-Finals before falling to the Detroit Waza in the Semi-Finals.

== History ==
The Mustangs are named for the original Chicago Mustangs that was a founding member of the United Soccer Association in 1967 and played in the North American Soccer League (NASL) in 1968 before becoming a semi-pro team in 1969.

== Off-field moves ==
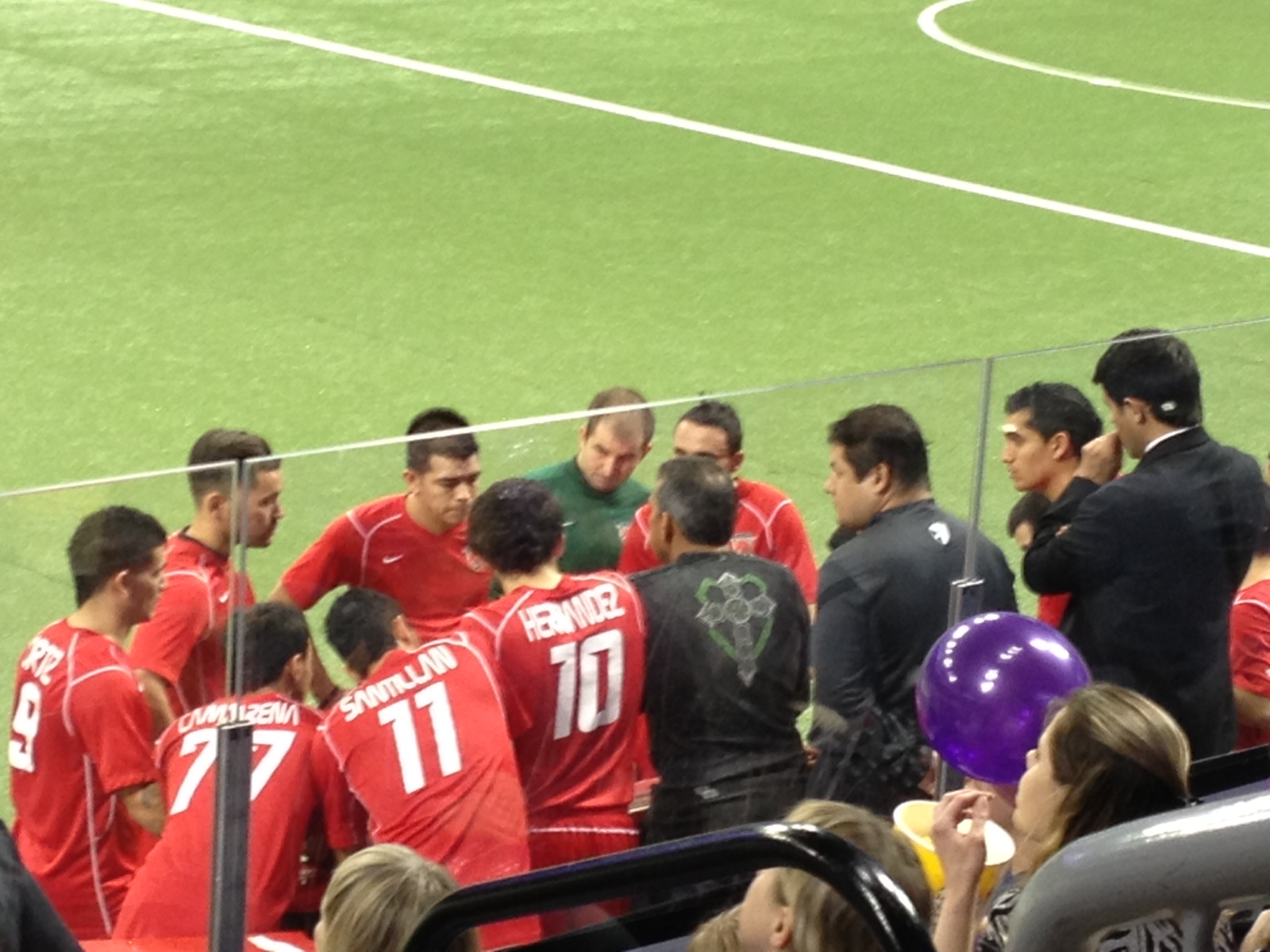
The Mustangs huddle during a road match against the Dallas Sidekicks on January 12, 2013.

8-year old Melissa Mendoza and her mother, the Mustangs' Director of Marketing, organized a canned food and clothing collection drive dubbed "Mission Melissa". Kicked off with a halftime presentation during the December 15th game against the Illinois Piasa, the drive collects for families in need at the holiday season. The team offered free tickets to any person that donated to the drive.

The team's first two home games had a reported attendance of 459 while the remaining home games each reported an attendance of 299. These numbers were reported by the team for technical reasons and may not represent an accurate count of home attendees.

== Roster moves ==
On November 2, 2012, the Mustangs announced the signing of Jose Omar Santillan, Ruben Omar Tapia, and Miguel Angel Vaca from the Guerreros de Guadalajara of the Liga Mexicana de Fútbol Rapido.

On February 6, 2013, the team submitted its 20-man roster in preparation for the postseason. Included on it were three newly signed midfielders: local Angel Escobedo plus Mexico national team veterans Eduardo Rodrigo Flores and Edgar Quintin Vazquez. Both Vazquez and Flores join four other Mustangs players who spend their summer with Guerreros De Guadalajara in the Liga Mexicana de Fútbol Rapido. Flores is also the brother of Mustangs goalkeeper Jesus Flores.

== Awards and honors ==
On January 1, 2013, the Professional Arena Soccer League named Nestor Hernandez as its Player of the Week. The league cited the rookie midfielder's team-leading scoring efforts, including six goals plus three assists in the previous weekend's two games, in making their decision.

In postseason honors, forward Nestor Hernandez was named to the 2012-13 PASL All-League First Team.

== Schedule ==
Win Tie Loss

=== Regular season ===
Game	Day	Date	Kickoff	Opponent	Results		Location	Attendance
Game	Day	Date	Kickoff	Opponent	Final Score	Record	Location	Attendance
1	Saturday	November 10	4:30pm	Illinois Piasa	W 16–8	1–0	Grand Sports Arena	459
2	Saturday	November 24	7:05pm	at Rockford Rampage	L 6–7	1–1	Victory Sports Complex	485
3	Saturday	December 1	7:30pm (6:30pm Central)	at Detroit Waza	L 7–8	1–2	Taylor Sportsplex	428
4	Saturday	December 8	4:30pm	Rockford Rampage†	W 8–7	2–2	Grand Sports Arena	459
5	Saturday	December 15	4:30pm	Illinois Piasa†	W 15–8	3–2	Grand Sports Arena	299
6	Sunday	December 23	1:30pm	Texas Strikers	W 20–1	4–2	Grand Sports Arena	299
7	Friday	December 28	8:00pm	Rio Grande Valley Flash	W 10–9	5–2	Grand Sports Arena	299
8	Monday	December 31	5:00pm	at Cincinnati Kings	W 6–5	6–2	GameTime Training Center	226
9	Saturday	January 5	7:35pm	at Illinois Piasa	W 7–6	7–2	The Sports Academy	360
10	Sunday	January 6	6:30pm	Dallas Sidekicks	W 8–7 (OT)	8–2	Grand Sports Arena	299
11	Friday	January 11	7:05pm	at Texas Strikers	W 12–2	9–2	Ford Arena	385
12	Saturday	January 12	7:00pm	at Dallas Sidekicks	L 2–6	9–3	Allen Event Center	4,015
13	Saturday	January 19	7:05pm	at Rockford Rampage	W 8–5	10–3	Victory Sports Complex	338
14	Sunday	January 27	5:30pm	Detroit Waza†	L 6–9	10–4	Grand Sports Arena	299
15	Friday	February 1	7:00pm	Harrisburg Heat	W 10–8	11–4	Grand Sports Arena	299
16	Friday	February 15	7:30pm	at Rio Grande Valley Flash	L 5–8	11–5	State Farm Arena	1,749

† Game also counts for US Open Cup, as listed in chart below.

=== 2012–13 US Open Cup for Arena Soccer ===
Game	Date	Kickoff	Opponent	Results		Location	Attendance
Game	Date	Kickoff	Opponent	Final Score	Record	Location	Attendance
Wild Card	December 8	4:30pm	Rockford Rampage	W 8–7	1–0	Grand Sports Arena	459
Round of 16	December 15	4:30pm	Illinois Piasa	W 15–8	2–0	Grand Sports Arena	299
Quarter-finals	January 20	5:00pm	Cincinnati Saints (PASL-Premier)	W 10–7	3–0	Grand Sports Arena	299
Semi-finals	January 27	4:30pm	Detroit Waza	L 6–9	3–1	Grand Sports Arena	299

== Team roster ==
As of February 6, 2013 Note: Flags indicate national team as defined under FIFA eligibility rules; some limited exceptions apply. Players may hold more than one non-FIFA nationality.

No.	Pos.	Nation	Player
1	GK	(United States) USA	Jorge Perez
4	DF	(Brazil) BRA	William Zardetto
5	DF	(United States) USA	Carlos Reyes
7	MF	(Mexico) MEX	Eduardo Rodrigo Flores
8	MF	(Mexico) MEX	Miguel Vaca
9	MF	(Mexico) MEX	Adrian Ortiz
10	MF	(Mexico) MEX	Nestor Hernandez
11	MF	(Mexico) MEX	Omar Santillan
12	MF	(United States) USA	Luis Ortega
13	DF	(United States) USA	Arturo Alanis

No.	Pos.	Nation	Player
14	FW		Michael Berriquin
15	FW	(Mexico) MEX	Omar Tapia
16	DF	(Mexico) MEX	Gabriel Corona
18	MF	(Mexico) MEX	Quintin Vasquez
20	DF	(Brazil) BRA	Guilherme Veiga
21	MF	(United States) USA	Angel Escobedo
23	GK	(United States) USA	Jesus Flores
56	FW	(England) ENG	Jay Lee Harris
59	FW	(United States) USA	Bryan Velazquez
77	FW	(United States) USA	Alexis Camarena

These are the 20 players submitted by the team to the league on February 6, 2013, as its final roster for possible postseason play. Other players who spent time on the Mustangs roster during the 2012–13 season include goalkeeper Victor Ayala; forwards Victor Blanco, Edwin Ferrera, Qudus Lawal, David Martinez, and Mario Pinon; midfielders Mario Calleros, Ivan Chino, Rafael Hernandez, Luis Mojica, and Manuel Salcedo; plus defenders Amaury Gasca and Narciso Cuevas Jr.
