= 2013–14 United States Open Cup for Arena Soccer =

2013–14 US Open Arena Soccer Championship

Tournament details
- Country: United States
- Dates: October 2013–March 2014

Final positions
- Champions: Chicago Mustangs

The 2013–14 US Open Arena Soccer Championship is the sixth edition of an open knockout style tournament for arena/indoor soccer. In this edition, teams from the Professional Arena Soccer League, Premier Arena Soccer League, and other independent indoor soccer teams are participating in the single elimination tournament.

Unlike a traditional tournament where many teams will gather at a single site to play a series of matches in a short period of time, the US Open Arena Soccer Championship incorporates a series of qualifying tournaments, special matches, and the regular season meetings of teams in the Professional Arena Soccer League over a series of months to fill out then complete the tournament bracket. This non-linear format is how, for example, the Cleveland Freeze advanced to the Semi-finals before the Tulsa Revolution played its weather-delayed Round of 32 match.

After a three-year run by the San Diego Sockers, the 2012–13 Open Cup was won by the Detroit Waza. This year, Detroit was knocked out in its first Open Cup match by the Harrisburg Heat.

== Tournament bracket ==
=== Western bracket ===
Wild Card/Qualifiers
PASLP	(Oregon) Yamhill County Crew	8
PASLP	(Washington (state)) South Sound Shock	5
Las Vegas
Qualifier"B"
PASL	(California) Ontario Fury	8
PASLP	(California) San Diego Sockers Reserves	5
South Central
Qualifier "B"

Round of 32
PASL	(California) Sacramento Surge	9
PASLP	(Oregon) Yamhill County Crew	6
PASL	(California) Turlock Express	4
PASL	(California) Bay Area Rosal	5
PASL	(Nevada) Las Vegas Legends	8
PASLP	(Nevada) Las Vegas Knights	4
PASL	(California) San Diego Sockers	13
PASL	(California) Ontario Fury	5
PASL	(Texas) Hidalgo La Fiera
BYE
PASL	(Texas) Dallas Sidekicks	16
PASLP	(Texas) Austin Capitals	5
PASL	Texas Strikers
BYE
South Central
Qualifier "A"

Round of 16
PASL	(California) Sacramento Surge	5
PASL	(California) Bay Area Rosal	9
PASL	(Nevada) Las Vegas Legends	12
PASL	(California) San Diego Sockers	9
PASL	(Texas) Hidalgo La Fiera	12
PASL	(Texas) Dallas Sidekicks	9
PASL	Texas Strikers	4
PASLP	(Texas) Austin FC	6

Quarterfinals
PASL	(California) Bay Area Rosal	0
PASL	(Nevada) Las Vegas Legends	21
PASL	(Texas) Hidalgo La Fiera	13
PASLP	(Texas) Austin FC	2

Semifinals
PASL	(Nevada) Las Vegas Legends	4
PASL	(Texas) Hidalgo La Fiera	5

=== Eastern bracket ===
Wild Card/Qualifiers
PASL	(Oklahoma) Tulsa Revolution	3
Ind	(Missouri) BH United	0
Ind	(Oklahoma) Tulsa Tea Men	7
PASLP	(Texas) Vitesse Dallas	6
PASLP	(Illinois) Chicago Mustangs Premier	1
Ind	(Illinois) AAC Eagles	3
Indiana
Qualifier
Harrisburg
Qualifier

Round of 32
PASL	(Kansas) Wichita B-52s	15
PASLP	(Colorado) Denver Dynamite	6
PASL	(Oklahoma) Tulsa Revolution	6
Ind	(Oklahoma) Tulsa Tea Men	2
PASL	Illinois Piasa	4
Ind	(Illinois) AAC Eagles	7
PASL	(Illinois) Chicago Mustangs	3
Ind	(Indiana) TOSB FC	0
PASL	(Michigan) Detroit Waza
BYE
PASL	(Pennsylvania) Harrisburg Heat	9
Ind	(Pennsylvania) Real Harrisburg	3
PASL	(Ohio) Cincinnati Saints
BYE
PASL	(Ohio) Cleveland Freeze
BYE

Round of 16
PASL	(Kansas) Wichita B-52s	10
PASL	(Oklahoma) Tulsa Revolution	9
Ind	(Illinois) AAC Eagles	5
PASL	(Illinois) Chicago Mustangs	10
PASL	(Michigan) Detroit Waza	8
PASL	(Pennsylvania) Harrisburg Heat	9
PASL	(Ohio) Cincinnati Saints	6
PASL	(Ohio) Cleveland Freeze	10

Quarterfinals
PASL	(Kansas) Wichita B-52s	5
PASL	(Illinois) Chicago Mustangs	10
PASL	(Pennsylvania) Harrisburg Heat	5
PASL	(Ohio) Cleveland Freeze	12

Semifinals
PASL	(Illinois) Chicago Mustangs	15
PASL	(Ohio) Cleveland Freeze	10

=== Championship ===
Final
PASL	(Texas) Hidalgo La Fiera	5
PASL	(Illinois) Chicago Mustangs	14

== Confirmed dates and matchups ==
All times local
† Game doubles as regular season or PASL Ron Newman Cup match

=== Wild Card round ===
- Sun. Nov. 17th, 5:00pm - Tulsa Tea Men (Independent) 7, Vitesse Dallas (PASL-Premier) 6 (OT)
- Sat. Nov. 23rd, 8:30pm - Yamhill County Crew (PASL-Premier) 8, South Sound Shock (PASL-Premier) 5†
- Sun. Dec. 1st, 2:15pm - AAC Eagles (Independent) 3, Chicago Mustangs Premier (PASL-Premier) 1
- Sun. Dec. 15th, 4:00pm - Ontario Fury (PASL) 8, San Diego Sockers Reserves (PASL-Premier) 5
- FORFEIT - (postponed from Fri. Dec. 6th and again Sun Dec. 22nd due to weather) - Tulsa Revolution (PASL) 3, BH United (Independent) 0 (forfeit)

=== Round of 32 ===
- Sun. Nov. 17th, 3:00pm - Dallas Sidekicks (PASL) 16, Austin Capitals (PASL-Premier) 5
- Fri. Dec. 13th, 7:05pm - Bay Area Rosal (PASL) 5, Turlock Express (PASL) 4†
- Sat. Dec. 14th, 7:35pm - AAC Eagles (Independent) 7, Illinois Piasa (PASL) 4
- Thu. Dec. 19th, 7:30pm - (postponed from December 14 due to weather) - Harrisburg Heat (PASL) 9, Real Harrisburg (Independent) 3
- Sat. Dec. 21st, 7:00pm - Sacramento Surge (PASL) 9, Yamhill County Crew (PASL-Premier) 6
- Sun. Dec. 22nd, 2:05pm - Chicago Mustangs (PASL) 3, TOSB FC (Independent) 0 (Forfeit)
- Sat. Dec. 28th, 7:05pm - Wichita B-52s (PASL) 15, Denver Dynamite (PASL-Premier) 6
- Sat. Dec. 28th, 7:05pm - San Diego Sockers (PASL) 13, Ontario Fury (PASL) 5†
- Thu. Jan. 2nd - Las Vegas Legends (PASL) 8, Las Vegas Knights (PASL-Premier) 4
- Sun. Jan. 12th, 10:00am - Tulsa Revolution (PASL) 6, Tulsa Tea Men (Independent) 2 @ Soccer City Tulsa

=== Round of 16 ===
- Sat. Dec. 14th, 7:05pm - Cleveland Freeze (PASL) 10, Cincinnati Saints (PASL) 6†
- Sat. Dec 21st, 7:05pm - Harrisburg Heat (PASL) 9, Detroit Waza (PASL) 8†1,590
- Sun. Dec. 22nd, 2:05pm - Chicago Mustangs (PASL) 10, A.A.C. Eagles (Independent) 5
- Sat. Dec. 28th, 8:00pm - Bay Area Rosal (PASL) 9, Sacramento Surge (PASL) 5†
- Sun. Dec. 29th, 5:05pm - Hidalgo La Fiera (PASL) 12, Dallas Sidekicks (PASL) 9†
- Fri. Jan. 3rd, 8:00pm - Austin FC (PASL-Premier) 6, Texas Strikers (PASL) 4 (at Cris Quinn Indoor Soccer Complex, Beaumont TX)
- Sat. Jan 11th, 7:05pm - Las Vegas Legends (PASL) 12, San Diego Sockers (PASL)† 9
- Sat. Jan 25th, 6:05pm - Wichita B-52s (PASL) 10, Tulsa Revolution (PASL) 9†

=== Quarterfinals ===
- Sat. Dec. 28th, 7:05pm - Cleveland Freeze (PASL) 12, Harrisburg Heat (PASL) 5†
- Sat. Feb. 1st, 7:05pm - Chicago Mustangs (PASL) 10, Wichita B-52s (PASL) 5†
- Sat. Feb. 1st, 7:30pm - Hidalgo La Fiera (PASL) 13, Austin FC (PASL-Premier) 2 (at Golazo Arena, Pharr, TX)
- Sun. Feb. 16th, 4:30pm - Las Vegas Legends (PASL) 21, Bay Area Rosal (PASL) 0

=== Semifinals ===
- Sat. Feb. 22nd, 4:00pm - Chicago Mustangs (PASL) 15, Cleveland Freeze (PASL) 10
- Sat. Mar. 15th, 5:00pm - Hidalgo La Fiera (PASL) 5, Las Vegas Legends (PASL) 4† (@ Chicago, IL)

=== Championship ===
- Sun. Mar. 16th, 4:30pm - Chicago Mustangs (PASL) 14, Hidalgo La Fiera (PASL) 5 †

== Qualifying ==
- Green indicates qualification for Qualifying Tournament Knockout Round(s)
- Bold Indicates Qualifying Tournament Winner and qualification to US Arena Open Cup
- All times local

=== Harrisburg Qualifying (Oct. 20) ===
Place	Team	W	L	T	GF	GA	Points
US Open Arena Soccer Qualifiers (Harrisburg Qualifier) - Group Standings (@ Harrisburg, PA)
1	Real Harrisburg (Independent)	4	0	0	32	7	12
2	Harrisburg United (Independent)	3	1	0	18	10	9
3	Sporting Club Dover (Independent)	2	2	0	15	11	6
4	Deportivo Esperante (Independent)	1	3	0	10	30	3
5	Barcelona (Independent)	0	4	0	10	27	0

==== Sunday, October 20, 2013 ====
Group Play

- 12:00pm- Sporting Club Dover 3, Barcelona 0
- 12:45pm- Real Harrisburg 9, Deportivo Esperante 1
- 1:30pm- Harrisburg United 6, Barcelona 3
- 2:15pm- Real Harrisburg 8, Sporting Club Dover 2
- 3:00pm- Harrisburg United 6, Deportivo Esperante 1
- 3:45pm- Real Harrisburg 10, Barcelona 1
- 4:30pm- Harrisburg United 3, Sporting Club Dover 1
- 5:15pm- Deportivo Esperante 8, Barcelona 6
- 6:00pm- Sporting Club Dover 9, Deportivo Esperante 0
- 6:45pm- Real Harrisburg 5, Harrisburg United 3

Real Harrisburg qualify for US Open Arena Soccer Championships

=== Illinois Qualifying (Oct. 26-27) ===
Place	Team	W	L	T	GF	GA	Points
US Open Arena Soccer Qualifiers (Illinois Qualifier) - Group Standings (@ Pontoon Beach, IL)
1	BH United (Independent)	3	0	0	11	6	9
2	Illinois Piasa Premier (PASL-Premier)	2	1	0	10	7	6
3	River City Legends (PASL-Premier)	1	2	0	12	10	3
4	Illinois Fire (PASL-Premier)	0	3	0	5	15	0

==== Saturday, October 26, 2013 ====
Group Play

- 5:00pm- BH United 4, River City Legends 2
- 5:50pm- Illinois Piasa Premier 4, Illinois Fire 1
- 7:30pm- River City Legends 6, Illinois Fire 1
- 5:00pm- BH United 2, Illinois Piasa Premier 1

==== Sunday, October 27, 2013 ====
Group Play

- 2:00pm- Illinois Piasa Premier 5, River City Legends 4
- 2:50pm- BH United 5, Illinois Fire 3

Final

- 4:15pm- BH United 5, Illinois Piasa Premier 3

BH United qualify for US Open Arena Soccer Championships

=== South Central Qualifying (Nov. 1-2) ===
Place	Team	W	L	T	GF	GA	Points
US Open Arena Soccer Qualifiers (South Central Qualifier) - Group Standings (@ Austin, TX)
1	Austin FC (PASL-Premier)	3	0	1	18	10	10
2	Austin Capitals (PASL-Premier)	3	1	0	17	10	9
3	Austin Gunners (PASL-Premier)	2	1	1	23	12	7
4	Atletico Barcelona (PASL-Premier)	0	3	1	9	20	1
5	Texas Strikers Premier (PASL-Premier)	0	3	1	14	29	1

==== Friday, November 1, 2013 ====
Group Play

- 9:30pm- Austin FC 2, Austin Gunners 2

==== Saturday, November 2, 2013 ====
Group Play

- 1:00pm- Austin Capitals 4, Austin Gunners 3
- 2:00pm- Texas Strikers Premier 3, Atletico Barcelona 3
- 6:00pm- Austin FC 6, Atletico Barcelona 3
- 6:45pm- Austin Capitals 9, Texas Strikers Premier 4
- 7:30pm- Austin Gunners 8, Atletico Barcelona 3
- 8:15pm- Austin FC 7, Texas Strikers Premier 4
- 9:00pm- Austin Capitals 3, Atletico Barcelona 0
- 9:45pm- Austin Gunners 10, Texas Strikers Premier 3
- 10:30pm- Austin FC 3, Austin Capitals 1

Austin FC and Austin Capitals qualify for US Open Arena Soccer Championships

=== Indiana Qualifying (Nov. 2-3) ===
Place	Team	W	L	T	GF	GA	Points
US Open Cup - Arena Soccer Qualifiers (Indiana Qualifier) - Standings (@ Lafayette, IN)
1	TOSB FC (Independent)	3	0	0	30	6	9
2	FC Indiana (PASL-Premier)	2	1	0	29	5	6
3	Fort Wayne Sport Club (MSL)	1	2	0	14	25	3
4	San Luis FC (MSL)	0	3	0	5	42	0

==== Saturday, November 2, 2013 ====
Group Play

- 12:00pm- TOSB FC 15, San Luis FC 1
- 1:00pm- FC Indiana 10, Fort Wayne Sport Club 1
- 4:00pm- TOSB FC 3, FC Indiana 2
- 5:00pm- Fort Wayne Sport Club 10, San Luis FC 3
- 8:00pm- FC Indiana 17, San Luis FC 1
- 9:00pm- TOSB FC 12, Fort Wayne Sport Club 3

==== Sunday, November 3, 2013 ====
Final

- 2:00pm- TOSB FC 5, FC Indiana 3

TOSB FC qualify for US Open Arena Soccer Championships

=== Northwest Qualifying (Nov. 23) ===
==== Saturday, November 23, 2013 ====
Final (@ Portland, OR)

- 8:30pm- Yamhill County Crew (PASL-Premier) 8, South Sound Shock (PASL-Premier) 5†

Yamhill County Crew qualify for US Open Arena Soccer Championships

=== Las Vegas Qualifying (Nov. 30 - Dec. 1) ===
Place	Team	W	L	T	GF	GA	Points
US Open Cup - Arena Soccer Qualifiers (Las Vegas Qualifier) - Group A Standings (@ Las Vegas, NV)
1	Las Vegas Knights (PASL-Premier)	2	0	0	15	5	6
2	San Diego Sockers Reserves (PASL-Premier)	1	1	0	11	7	3
3	Maracana Tucson (PASL-Premier)	0	2	0	3	17	0
US Open Cup - Arena Soccer Qualifiers (Las Vegas Qualifier) - Group B Standings (@ Las Vegas, NV)
1	Juventus LVFC (Independent)	2	0	0	16	3	6
2	Las Vegas United (Independent)	1	1	0	15	9	3
3	Atlante FC (Independent)	0	2	0	4	23	0

==== Saturday, November 30, 2013 ====
Group Play

- Las Vegas Knights 10, Maracana Tucson 1
- Juventus LVFC 9, Atlante FC 2
- Las Vegas Knights 5, San Diego Sockers Reserves 4
- Juventus LVFC 7, Las Vegas United 1
- San Diego Sockers Reserves 7, Maracana Tucson 2
- Las Vegas United 14, Atlante FC 2

Quarterfinals

- San Diego Sockers Reserves 1, Atlante FC 0
- Maracana Tucson 6, Las Vegas United 5

==== Sunday, December 1, 2013 ====
Semifinals

- 11:00am- Las Vegas Knights 7, Maracana Tucson 1
- 11:50am- San Diego Sockers Reserves 7, Juventus LVFC 3

Finals

- 1:15pm- San Diego Sockers Reserves 6, Las Vegas Knights 5 (SO)

San Diego Sockers Reserves and Las Vegas Knights qualify for US Open Arena Soccer Championships

=== Chicago Qualifying (Dec. 1) ===
==== Sunday, December 1, 2013 ====
Final (@ The Odeum, Villa Park, IL)

- 2:30pm- AAC Eagles (Independent) 3, Chicago Mustangs Premier (PASL-Premier) 1

AAC Eagles qualify for US Open Arena Soccer Championships
