= Kim Røntved =

Danish footballer (born 1960)

Personal information
- Date of birth: 9 May 1960 (age 66)
- Place of birth: Copenhagen, Denmark
- Height: 5 ft 11 in (1.80 m)
- Position: Defender

Senior career*
Years	Team	Apps	(Gls)
1978–1979	Brønshøj BK	36	(4)
1979–1980	Randers Freja FC		
1980–1987	Wichita Wings (indoor)	282	(183)
1982	Tulsa Roughnecks	16	(0)
1983	Dallas Americans		
1987–1991	Kansas City Comets (indoor)	168	(57)
1991–1998	Wichita Wings (indoor)	252	(126)
1992–1995	Colorado Foxes		
1998–1999	Kansas City Attack (indoor)	29	(14)
2015	Wichita B-52s (indoor)	1	

Managerial career
- 1991–1994: Wichita Wings (assistant)
- 1994–1998: Wichita Wings
- 2010–2014: Kansas City Comets
- 2014–2015: Wichita B-52s
- 2017–2019: Kansas City Comets
- * Club domestic league appearances and goals

Kim Røntved (born 9 May 1960), known as "the Rocket", is a Danish former professional soccer player and head coach. A 17-time all-star in various leagues, and a fan favorite with the Wichita Wings, he was inducted into the Indoor Soccer Hall of Fame in February 2014.

== Career ==
Born in Copenhagen, Røntved is the younger brother of Per Røntved. He started his career in Brønshøj BK before turning out for Randers Freja. In 1980, the Wichita Wings of the Major Indoor Soccer League purchased Røntved's contract. He spent seven seasons in Wichita. In 1982, he played outdoor soccer with the Tulsa Roughnecks of the North American Soccer League. In 1983, he played for the Dallas Americans of the American Soccer League. In 1987, financial difficulties led the Wings to release Røntved and several other veteran players. On 8 July 1987, he signed as a free agent with the Kansas City Comets. When the Comets folded in the summer of 1991, Rontved became a free agent. In September 1991, he signed as a player-assistant coach with the Wings. He was the 1993 NPSL Defender of the Year. On 5 July 1992, he signed with the Colorado Foxes of the American Professional Soccer League. In 1992, the Wichita Wings moved to the National Professional Soccer League. In 1998, the Wings came under new ownership and they released Rontved, who then signed as a free agent with the Kansas City Attack.

Røntved served as the head coach of the Missouri Comets from 16 August 2010, to 29 August 2013. In October 2014, he was named Director of Operations for the Wichita B-52s; two months later, he became head coach. On 8 February 2015, he and Missouri Comets head coach Vlatko Andonovski came out of retirement to play against each other in a regular season game.

== Honours ==
- MISL Defender of the Year: 1983–84, 1985–86
- NPSL Defender of the Year: 1992–93
- Member of the Indoor Stars of the Century Team
