= Wichita B-52s =

- Founded: 2013
- Ground: Hartman Arena; Wichita, Kansas
- Capacity: 5,000
- Owner/President: Joseph Pindell
- Head Coach: Kim Roentved
- League: Major Arena Soccer League
- 2014–15: 4th, Central Division; Playoffs: DNQ
- Website: http://www.wichitab52s.com/

The Wichita B-52s was an American professional indoor soccer team based in Wichita, Kansas. Founded in July 2013, the team made its debut in the Professional Arena Soccer League with the 2013–14 season under head coach Larry Inlow. After beginning the 2014–15 season under Jeff Kraft, Kim Roentved was named head coach in December 2014. The team played its home games at Hartman Arena in Park City, Kansas. In August 2015, the team announced it would not be participating in the 2015–16 MASL season.

== History ==
In June 2013, the Wichita Wings of the MISL folded but a successor corporation named FC Wichita LLC announced their intention to join the PASL for the 2013–14 season. The name and home arena for the Wichita, Kansas, based team were not immediately announced. On July 10, the team announced that it secured a lease at Hartman Arena but now planned to delay joining the PASL until the 2014–15 season.

On July 23, the PASL announced that a different ownership group had secured a Hartman Arena lease and the franchise to play in Wichita for the 2013–14 season. On August 22, team owner Joseph Pindell announced that it will play as the "Wichita B-52s" to honor the city's aviation heritage. (More than 700 Boeing B-52 Stratofortress aircraft were built in Wichita.) The team's blue and orange official colors reflect the colors of the original Wichita Wings. Indoor soccer veteran Jeff Kraft served as head coach for the first five games of the 2014–15 season. He was replaced on an interim basis by former assistant coach Darin Smith.

Kim Roentved, former professional soccer player and former head coach of the Missouri Comets indoor soccer team, was named in October 2014 to be the Director of Operations for the Wichita B-52s. Roentved was also a fan favorite player when he played for the Wichita Wings. On December 2, 2014, the team elevated him to head coach.

In May 2015, local media reported that some players and staff had worked the previous season without pay, some checks written by the team to vendors had bounced, and that the team owed Hartman Arena approximately $2,000. Team owner Joey Pindell told KWCH-DT that the "B-52's are experiencing some struggles" but that he was working with MASL officials to resolve their issues. In August 2015, the team it would not be participating in the 2015–16 MASL season.

== Year-by-year ==
League champions	Runners-up	Division champions*	Playoff berth

Year	League	Reg. season	GF	GA	Pct	Finish	Playoffs	Avg. attendance
2013–14	PASL	7–9	91	113	.438	4th, Central	Did not qualify	1,650
2014–15	MASL	10–10	135	144	.500	4th, Central	Did not qualify	1,463
