= Heartland Credit Union Arena =

Multi-purpose arena in Park City, Kansas

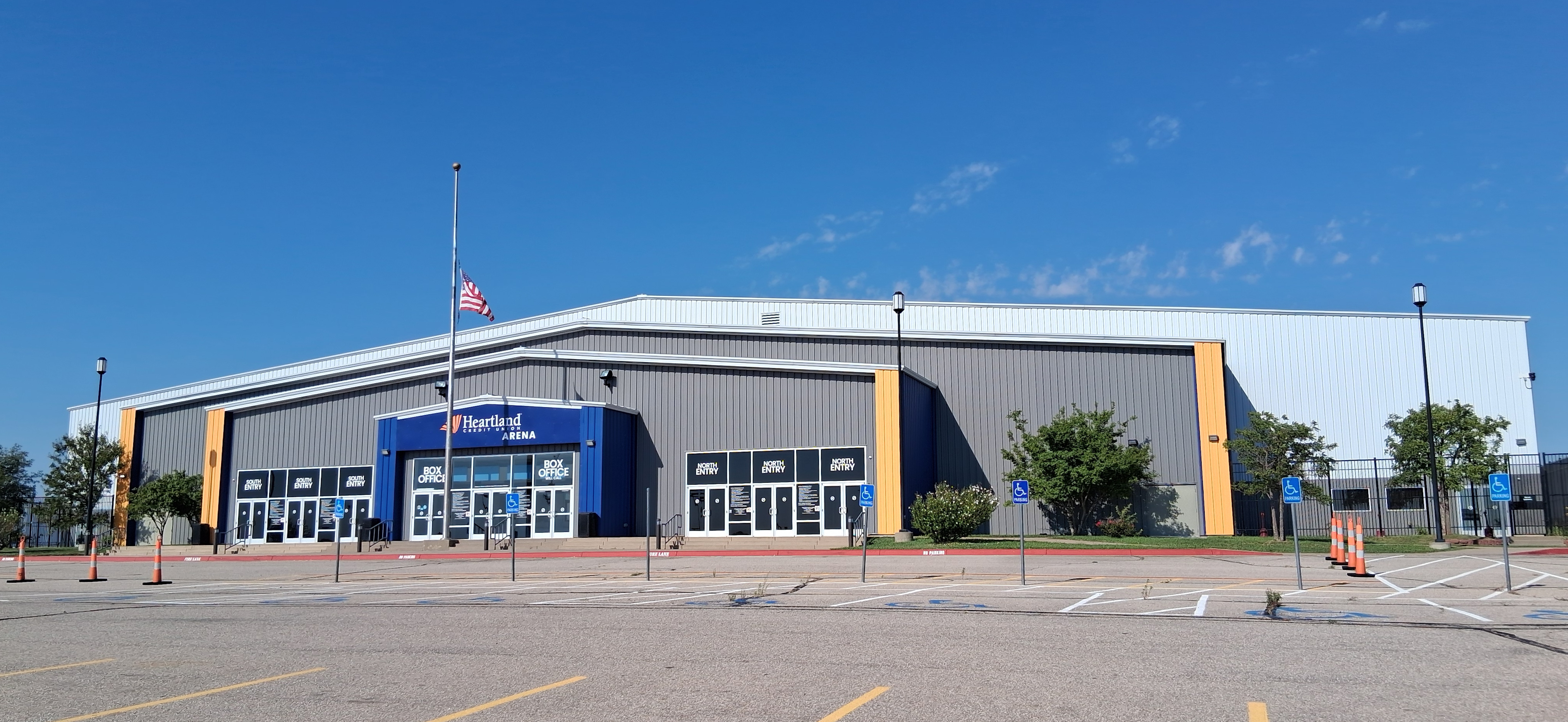
- Heartland Credit Union Arena in 2026
- Interactive map of Heartland Credit Union Arena
- Former names: Hartman Arena (2009–2024); Park City Arena (2024–2025)
- Location: 8151 N. Arena Drive; Park City, Kansas 67147 USA
- Coordinates: 37.831°N 97.330°W
- Owner: Wink Hartman
- Operator: VenuWorks
- Capacity: 5,000 (6,500 with full floor set)

Construction
- Groundbreaking: March 25, 2008
- Opened: March 2009
- Architect: Law-Kingdon Inc

Tenants
- Wichita Wild (IFL/CPIFL) (2009–2014); Wichita Wings (MISL) (2011–2013); Wichita B-52s (MASL) (2013–2015); Wichita Wings (M2) (2019–present); Wichita Regulators (AFL) (2023–2024)

Website
- HeartlandCreditUnionArena.com

Heartland Credit Union Arena, formerly known as Hartman Arena and Park City Arena, is a privately managed 5,000-seat multi-purpose arena in Park City, Kansas, United States. It is located northwest of I-135 and 77th Street North in the north Wichita metro area.

== History ==
Ground was broken on March 25, 2008, and the arena opened the last week of March 2009. The architecture firm of Law-Kingdon Inc. designed the facility. Tickets.com and Hartman Arena have a multiyear ticketing service agreement.

Hartman Arena hosts home games of the Wichita B-52s of the Major Arena Soccer League. It also hosts the Kansas State High School Activities Association Class 6A and 5A State Wrestling Tournaments. They were moved here after one year at Intrust Bank Arena.

The arena hosted the Wichita Wild of the Champions Professional Indoor Football League from 2009 until the team folded after the 2014 season. In 2020, the Wichita Force announced it would bring indoor football back to Hartman, but the season was cancelled before it had begun due to the COVID-19 pandemic. The Force then began play for the 2021 season at the Kansas Star Arena instead.

On May 23, 2024, Hartman Arena officially changed its name to Park City Arena.

On December 8, 2025, it was announced that the arena's name would once again be changed, this time to Heartland Credit Union Arena.

On October 19, 2026, President Donald Trump held a rally at Heartland Credit Union Arena in support of Kansas Republicans including incumbent senator Roger Marshall who is running in a competitive race against Democrat Adam Hamilton. Multiple hecklers were escorted out of the rally. A man was arrested for allegedly threatening to assassinate Trump.

== Tenants ==
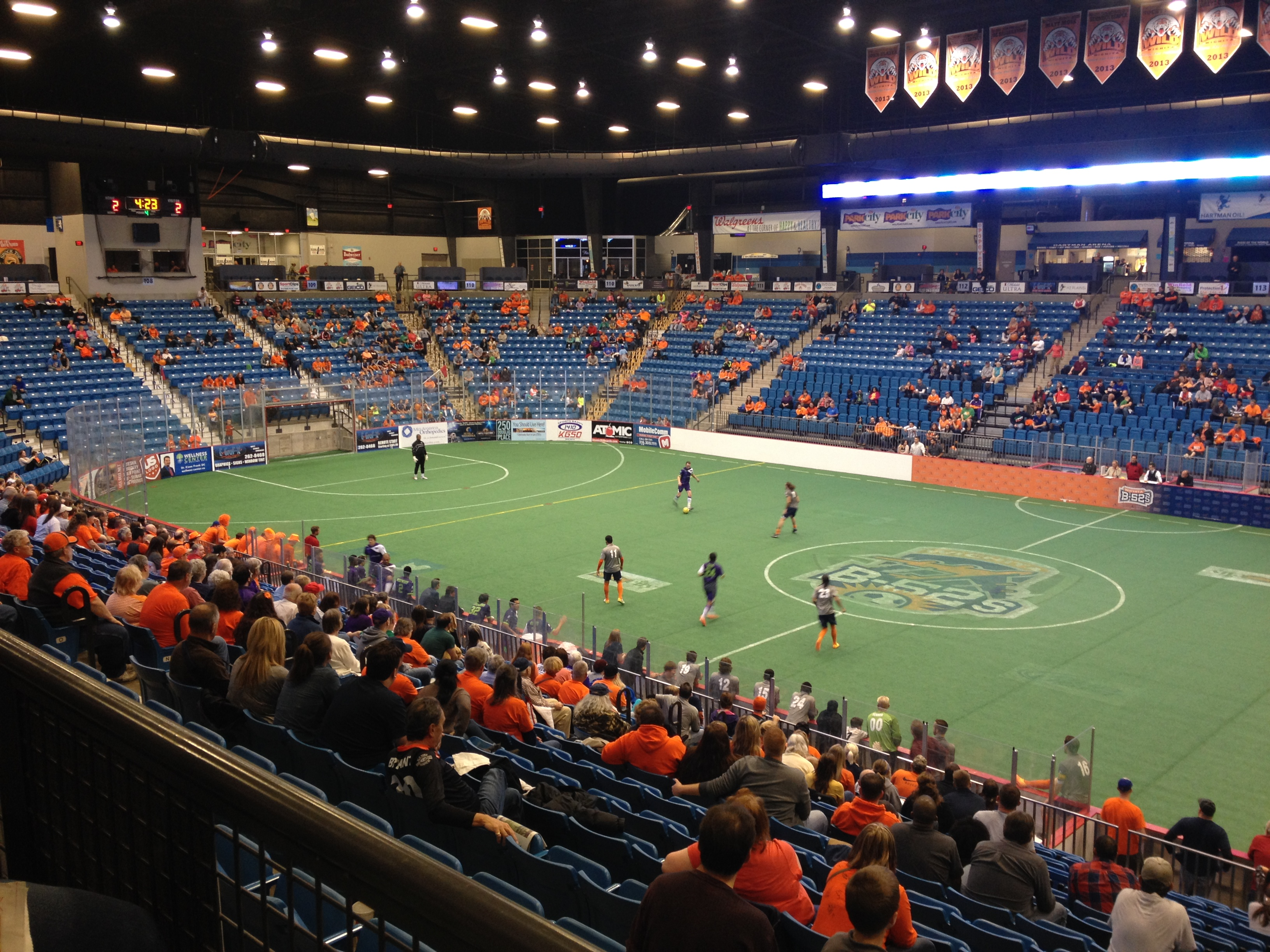
Wichita B-52s hosting the Dallas Sidekicks in November 2014

=== Wichita B-52s ===
Hartman Arena was the home of the Wichita B-52s of Major Arena Soccer League starting with their inaugural 2013–14 season.

=== Wichita Wild ===
The Wichita Wild called Hartman Arena home for their Indoor Football League games from 2009 through 2012 and their Champions Professional Indoor Football League games since switching leagues for 2013 and 2014. The team was replaced by the Wichita Force when the CPIFL merged into the Champions Indoor Football.

=== Wichita Wings ===
The Wichita Wings will call the Hartman Arena home for their first season in the Major Arena Soccer League 2.

=== ICT Regulators ===
In 2022, the ICT Regulators announced they would begin play at Hartman Arena in 2023. They initially intended to play in Champions Indoor Football (CIF), but instead opted to play an independent schedule for their inaugural season. The Regulators opened their first season on March 12, 2023, marking the first time Hartman had hosted indoor football in nine years. The Regulators were added to the CIF for the 2024 season, which by the time of that season's launch had merged with the Arena Football League.

== Concerts ==
List of Concerts
- Alan Jackson & The Strayhorns – March 28, 2009, with Jake Owen and May 1, 2014, with Jamie Lynn Spears
- The Music as a Weapon Music Festival – April 1, 2009
- Slipknot – May 10, 2009, with DevilDriver and All That Remains
- Yanni – June 10, 2009
- New Kids on the Block – July 3, 2009, with Jesse McCartney and The Jabbawockeez
- Twista – July 29, 2009, with Flo Rida
- Earth, Wind & Fire & Chicago – August 21, 2009
- KZCH Channel 9–6–3's Pink Ribbon Event – September 17, 2009 and September 23, 2010
- Martina McBride & Trace Adkins – December 4, 2009
- Koyie Hill's Big Wish Benefit Concert – December 5, 2009
- KZCH Channel 9–6–3's Jingle Ball – December 17, 2009 and December 16, 2010
- The Ultimate Elvis Tribute Artists Concert – January 21, 2010
- Uncle Kracker – February 12, 2010, with Moreland and Arbuckle
- KZCH Channel 9–6–3's Spring Fling – March 18, 2010 and March 23, 2011
- Skillet – May 6, 2010, with Red and The Letter Black and April 21, 2011, with Stone Sour, Theory of a Deadman, Halestorm and Art of Dying
- Rob Zombie – May 9, 2010, with Alice Cooper and May 25, 2012, with Megadeth and Volbeat
- The Blues, Brews & BBQ Festival – July 24, 2010
- KZSN Kissin' 102.1's Summer Splash – July 25, 2010
- KDGS Power 93.9's Freaknic Jam – July 30, 2010
- Ted Nugent – August 8, 2010, with Val Halla and June 19, 2012, with Styx and REO Speedwagon
- Randy Montana – August 25, 2010
- Kansas – September 18, 2010 with the Wichita Symphony Orchestra and October 5, 2024
- .38 Special – November 19, 2010, with Jimmie Van Zant and The Terry Quiett Band
- Gloriana – December 1, 2010, with Thompson Square and James Wesley
- tobyMac & The Diverse City Band – January 15, 2011, with House of Heroes and Brandon Heath
- KZSN Kissin' 102.1's Birthday Bash – February 14, 2011
- Vince Gill – March 17, 2011
- Bret Michaels – March 31, 2011
- KZCH Channel 9–6–3's SummerStock – May 21, 2011
- Whitesnake – May 26, 2011, with Warrant
- Cody Simpson – August 12, 2011
- The Script – September 16, 2011, with SafetySuit
- Boz Scaggs & Michael McDonald – October 6, 2011
- Slammin' Sammy's Birthday Bash – October 15, 2011
- KZCH Channel 9–6–3's Holiday Spectacular – December 17, 2011
- The Newsboys – April 3, 2011, with Abandon, The Anthem Lights and The City Harmonic
- "Weird Al" Yankovic – May 1, 2012
- KZCH Channel 9–6–3's School's Out Blowout – May 24, 2012
- Big & Rich – July 28, 2012, with Cowboy Troy and Bradley Gaskin
- Everclear – August 8, 2012, with Sugar Ray, Gin Blossoms, Lit and Marcy Playground
- Crosby, Stills & Nash – August 11, 2012
- Dierks Bentley – August 17, 2012, with Logan Mize
- Tony Bennett – November 2, 2012
- Steven Curtis Chapman – December 6, 2012
- The Moody Blues – October 15, 2013
- The Beach Boys – December 19, 2013
- The Randy Rogers Band – February 7, 2014, with The Josh Abbott Band and Charlie Worsham and February 20, 2015, with The Turnpike Troubadours and Wade Bowen
- Justin Moore – March 21, 2014, with Randy Houser and Josh Thompson
- Jake Owen – June 29, 2014, with Parmalee and The Cadillac Three
- Blues Traveler – July 3, 2014, with Sugar Ray, Smash Mouth and Uncle Kracker
- Phillip Phillips – October 5, 2014, with Christian Burghardt
- Café Tacuba – October 23, 2014
- Little Big Town – November 21, 2014, with Brett Eldredge and Brothers Osborne
- Michael W. Smith – December 11, 2014, with Rachael Lampa
- Bush, Līve, and Our Lady Peace ALTimate Tour – August 2, 2019
- AJR - September 15, 2021
- For King and Country – April 28, 2023
