= Chicago Mustangs (2012–present) =

American indoor soccer teams

- Full name: Chicago Mustangs
- Founded: 2012
- Stadium: Grand Sports Arena (indoor); Hoffman Estates, Illinois; MAC Athletic Complex (outdoor); Crystal Lake, Illinois
- Capacity: (Now Arena)11,800 (9,400 with field) (MAC) unknown
- Owner/CEO: Armando Gamboa
- Coach: Armando Gamboa (2013–present)
- League: MLIS (indoor); Midwest Premier League (outdoor)
- 1st, Eastern Division; Playoffs: M2 Champions
- Website: http://www.chicagomustangspro.com
| Home colours | Away colours | Third colours |

The Chicago Mustangs are professional indoor soccer teams based at the Now Arena in the Chicago suburb of Hoffman Estates, Illinois, that plays in Major League Indoor Soccer.

They are also competing outdoors as members of the Midwest Premier League and their women's team in United Women's Soccer.

== History ==
The Mustangs were originally awarded an expansion franchise in the Professional Arena Soccer League on September 25, 2012. The team was originally coached by Narciso "Chicho" Cuevas until he was replaced on the bench late in the 2012–13 season by team owner Armando Gamboa.

The Mustangs won the PASL Championship in the 2013–14 season. They were undefeated in the regular season, setting a PASL record of 202 goals in a season. They earned the right to host the Final Four of the Ron Newman Cup playoffs, which they also claimed. They defeated the Cleveland Freeze 10–3 in the semifinals before stopping Hidalgo La Fiera 14–5 in the Newman Cup Final. That victory also earned the United States Open Cup for Arena Soccer title. They became members of the Midwest Premier League on February 1, 2021, and competed in the league's West Division following the 2021 MASL 2 season. The MAC Athletic Complex in Crystal Lake will host the MPL matches.

On August 22, 2022, the Mustangs were officially announced as a charter team in the new MLISL.

On August 12, 2024, the Chicago Mustangs officially announced that they would field a women's team for the 2024-2025 season. The Mustangs previously fielded a women's team that competed in the Premier Arena Soccer League (PASL) and the United Women's Soccer (UWS) league.

== Personnel ==
=== Staff ===
- Armando Gamboa - Owner/CEO and Head Coach

== Year-by-year ==
| League champions | Runners-up | Division champions | Playoff berth |

| Year | League | Reg. season | GF | GA | Finish | Playoffs | U.S. Open Cup | Avg. attendance |
|---|---|---|---|---|---|---|---|---|
| 2012–13 | PASL | 11–5 | 146 | 104 | 3rd, Central | Did not qualify | Semifinals | 339 |
| 2013–14 | PASL | 16–0 | 202 | 83 | 1st, Eastern | Won Ron Newman Cup | U.S. Open champions | 779 |
| 2014–15 | MASL | 11–9 | 137 | 133 | 3rd, Central | Lost in Conference SF | none | 1,672 |
| 2015–16 | MASL | 13–7 | 152 | 123 | 2nd, Central | Lost in Central Division SF | none | 2,510 |
| 2016–17 | MASL | 11–9 | 124 | 136 | 3rd, Central | Did not qualify | none | 2,623 |
| 2017–18 | MASL2 | 10–2 | 114 | 61 | 1st, Eastern | Won M2 Championship | none | unk |
| 2018–19 | MASL2 | 10–2 | 92 | 62 | 1st, Eastern | Lost in QF | None | unk |
| 2020-21 | MASL2 | 5–5 | 81 | 86 | 4th | Lost in Semifinals | None | unk |
| 2021-22 | MASL2 | 6-6 | 93 | 110 | 3rd, Great Lakes | Lost in Quarterfinals | None | unk |
| 2022-23 | MLIS | 9-3 | 91 | 59 | 2nd Central | Lost in Wild Card Game | None | 1,000 |
| 2023-24 | MLIS | 8-4 | 107 | 74 | 3rd MLIS | Lost in Semifinals | None | 1,000 |
| 2024-25 | MLIS | 4-8 | 76 | 94 | 7th MLIS | Did Not Qualify | None | 1,000 |
| 2025-26 | MLIS | 6-6 | 89 | 91 | 4th, North | Did Not Qualify | None | 1,000 |
| Totals: | | 124–66 | 1504 | 1216 | | | | |

== Playoff record ==
| Year | Win | Loss | GF | GA | Avg. attendance |
|---|---|---|---|---|---|
| 2013–14 | 2 | 0 | 24 | 8 | 3,916 |
| 2014–15 | 1 | 2 | 9 | 14 | 1,443 |
| 2015–16 | 1 | 2 | 9 | 11 | 3,746 |
| 2016–18 | 2 | 0 | 16 | 2 | ? |
| 2023-24 | 0 | 1 | 6 | 12 | NHG |
| Total | 6 | 5 | 64 | 47 | |

== Honors ==
- 2013–14 PASL Eastern Division champions
- 2013–14 PASL Ron Newman Cup champions
- 2013–14 U.S. Open champions

== Mustangs Premier ==
The Chicago Mustangs Premier are the minor league affiliate of the Mustangs, competing in the Premier Arena Soccer League. Mustangs Premier home games are played at Grand Sports Arena in Hoffman Estates, Illinois or Sears Centre.

In 2013–14, Mustangs Premier went undefeated in the regular season and went on to capture the PASL National Championship.
