= Park City, Kansas =

City in Sedgwick County, Kansas

- City
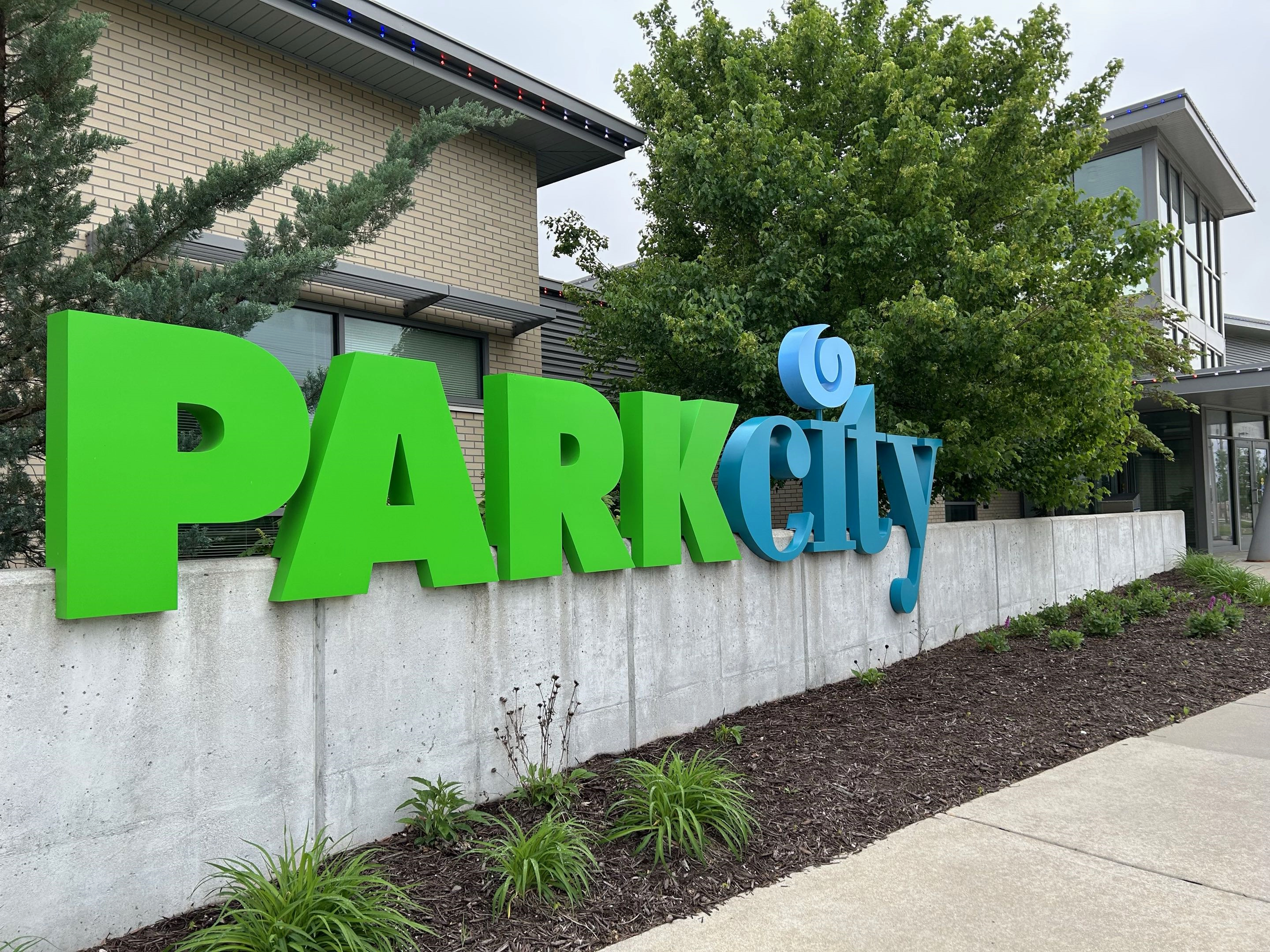
- Sign in Park City (2026)

- Flag

- Location within Sedgwick County and Kansas
- Interactive map of Park City, Kansas
- Coordinates: 37°47′57″N 97°19′20″W
- Country: United States
- State: Kansas
- County: Sedgwick
- Founded: 1953
- Incorporated: 1980

Government
  - Mayor: John Lehnherr

Area
  - Total: 9.82 sq mi (25.43 km^{2})
  - Land: 9.80 sq mi (25.37 km^{2})
  - Water: 0.019 sq mi (0.05 km^{2})
- Elevation: 1,365 ft (416 m)

Population (2020)
  - Total: 8,333
  - Density: 850.7/sq mi (328.5/km^{2})
- Time zone: UTC-6 (CST)
  - Summer (DST): UTC-5 (CDT)
- ZIP Codes: 67147, 67204, 67219
- Area code: 316
- FIPS code: 20-54450
- GNIS ID: 473849
- Website: parkcityks.gov

Park City is a city in Sedgwick County, Kansas, United States and a northern suburb of Wichita. As of the 2020 census, the population of the city was 8,333.

== History ==
The first Park City was founded in 1870. Located 14 miles (23 km) to the northwest of Wichita, at first it was a formidable rival and in the running to be the county seat but lost. When the railroad bypassed it and came to Wichita, the town died, and its houses were moved to Wichita, Newton, and Hutchinson.

Park City began as the Park City Improvement District in 1953. The district grew from a being quarter section of farmland purchased by developers into a 3,321-acre (13.44 km^{2}) community. After the approval of the Sedgwick County Board of Commissioners, Park City became a third class city on November 26, 1980. The new city held a special election on February 17, 1981. Raymond J. Reiss was elected mayor along with five council members to form the first governing body.

== Geography ==
Park City is located at 37°47′57″N 97°19′20″W (37.799119, -97.322110). According to the United States Census Bureau, the city has a total area of 9.51 square miles (24.63 km^{2}), of which 9.49 square miles (24.58 km^{2}) is land and 0.02 square miles (0.05 km^{2}) is water.

== Demographics ==
Historical population
| Census | Pop. | Note | %± |
|---|---|---|---|
| 1990 | 5,050 | | — |
| 2000 | 5,814 | | 15.1% |
| 2010 | 7,297 | | 25.5% |
| 2020 | 8,333 | | 14.2% |
| 2025 (est.) | 9,458 | | 13.5% |
U.S. Decennial Census; 2010-2020

Park City is part of the Wichita metropolitan area.

=== 2020 census ===
As of the 2020 census, Park City had a population of 8,333, with 3,042 households and 2,268 families. The population density was 843.2 per square mile (325.5/km^{2}). There were 3,233 housing units at an average density of 327.1 per square mile (126.3/km^{2}). The median age was 32.8 years. 28.5% of residents were under the age of 18 and 11.8% were 65 years of age or older. For every 100 females, there were 97.3 males, and for every 100 females age 18 and over, there were 95.4 males.

91.3% of residents lived in urban areas, while 8.7% lived in rural areas.

There were 3,042 households, of which 40.7% had children under the age of 18 living in them. Of all households, 54.3% were married-couple households, 15.8% were households with a male householder and no spouse or partner present, and 21.7% were households with a female householder and no spouse or partner present. About 19.5% of all households were made up of individuals, and 7.8% had someone living alone who was 65 years of age or older. The average household size was 2.6 and the average family size was 2.8.

There were 3,233 housing units, of which 5.9% were vacant. The homeowner vacancy rate was 1.9% and the rental vacancy rate was 10.1%.

Racial composition as of the 2020 census
| Race | Number | Percent |
|---|---|---|
| White | 6,530 | 78.4% |
| Black or African American | 409 | 4.9% |
| American Indian and Alaska Native | 106 | 1.3% |
| Asian | 123 | 1.5% |
| Native Hawaiian and Other Pacific Islander | 4 | 0.0% |
| Some other race | 302 | 3.6% |
| Two or more races | 859 | 10.3% |
| Hispanic or Latino (of any race) | 894 | 10.7% |

Demographic estimates

The percent of those with a bachelor's degree or higher was estimated to be 16.8% of the population.

Income and poverty

The 2016–2020 5-year American Community Survey estimates show that the median household income was $67,286 (with a margin of error of +/- $9,618) and the median family income was $73,199 (+/- $12,731). Males had a median income of $48,917 (+/- $7,233) versus $37,464 (+/- $10,516) for females. The median income for those above 16 years old was $41,518 (+/- $3,398). Approximately, 0.9% of families and 6.7% of the population were below the poverty line, including 4.7% of those under the age of 18 and 2.2% of those ages 65 or over.

=== 2010 census ===
As of the census of 2010, there were 7,297 people, 2,659 households, and 2,039 families living in the city. The population density was 768.9 inhabitants per square mile (296.9/km^{2}). There were 2,875 housing units at an average density of 303.0 per square mile (117.0/km^{2}). The racial makeup of the city was 86.1% White, 4.3% African American, 1.4% Native American, 1.6% Asian, 2.9% from other races, and 3.8% from two or more races. Hispanic or Latino of any race were 8.8% of the population.

There were 2,659 households, of which 41.3% had children under the age of 18 living with them, 58.2% were married couples living together, 12.4% had a female householder with no husband present, 6.1% had a male householder with no wife present, and 23.3% were non-families. 18.1% of all households were made up of individuals, and 4.9% had someone living alone who was 65 years of age or older. The average household size was 2.74 and the average family size was 3.11. The median age in the city was 31.7 years. 29.2% of residents were under the age of 18; 8.1% were between the ages of 18 and 24; 31.3% were from 25 to 44; 23.4% were from 45 to 64; and 8.1% were 65 years of age or older. The gender makeup of the city was 49.9% male and 50.1% female.

== Economy ==
In 2009, Hartman Arena in town was opened. It was privately constructed by local developer Wink Hartman. It serves as the home of the Wichita Wings indoor soccer and the Wichita Regulators Arena Football League team. In 2024, it was renamed to the Park City Arena.

In 2021, Amazon built a 1 million-square-foot fulfillment center at the northeast corner of E 69th St N and N Broadway Ave.

== Education ==
The city is served by the Valley Center USD 262 and Wichita USD 259 public school districts.

== Transportation ==
Interstate 135 runs north-south through Park City.

== Media ==
The only newspaper in Park City has had was The Park City Newsdropper. It ran for a year in 1980 and the publisher was Jerrie Molina, the city's first city clerk.

== Notable people ==
- Emil Bergquist (b. 1955), member of the Kansas House of Representatives and former mayor of Park City
- Dennis Rader (b. 1945), serial killer known as BTK. He is incarcerated at the El Dorado Correctional Facility.
- Kerri Rawson (b. 1978), daughter of the aforementioned serial killer, victim's rights advocate, and author
