= 2014–15 Harrisburg Heat season =

Harrisburg Heat
2014–15 MASL season
- Owner: John Wilsbach
- Head Coach: Tarik Walker
- Arena: Farm Show Large Arena; 2300 North Cameron Street; Harrisburg, Pennsylvania 17110
- Major Arena Soccer League: 5th, Eastern (regular season)
- Top goalscorer: Kenneth Fultz (18 goals, 12 assists)
- Highest home attendance: 4,989 (February 27 vs. Baltimore Blast)
- Lowest home attendance: 1,487 (January 3 vs. Baltimore Blast)
- Average home league attendance: 2,989 (10 games)

The 2014–15 Harrisburg Heat season was the third season of the Harrisburg Heat professional indoor soccer club. The Heat, an Eastern Division team in the Major Arena Soccer League, played their home games at the Pennsylvania Farm Show Complex & Expo Center's Large Arena in Harrisburg, Pennsylvania.

The team was led by owner John Wilsbach, head coach Tarik Walker, and assistant coach Gino DiFlorio. The Heat struggled this season, earning a 2–18 record and last place in the five-team Eastern Division. All of the Heat's home games aired live on WMSS (91.1 FM). Most MASL games were streamed by Go Live Sports with select games streamed live by ESPN3.

== Season summary ==
The Heat celebrated last season's relative success at the box office by moving to the Farm Show's Large Arena and there they performed well this season, drawing an average of 2,989 fans to each home game, nearly double last season's average. However, on the field the team found little to celebrate. The Heat lost their first 12 games in a row before defeating the St. Louis Ambush 25–16 in front of a home crowd on January 30. The Heat then lost their next 6 games before a season-finale win over the Detroit Waza on February 28. This gave Harrisburg a 2–18 record and fifth-place in the five-team Eastern Division.

== History ==
The new Heat claim the heritage of the original Harrisburg Heat professional indoor soccer team which played 12 seasons in the National Professional Soccer League, which later became the second Major Indoor Soccer League, from 1991 through 2003.

The Heat completed their inaugural 2012-13 season with a 6–10 record, finishing 3rd in the PASL's Eastern Division. In the 2013–14 season, they slipped to 4–12 and did not qualify for the playoffs. After playing at the 2,200-seat Equine Arena for their first two seasons, the Heat moved to the Farm Show Complex's 7,300-seat Large Arena for 2014–15.

== Off-field moves ==
In May 2014, the Professional Arena Soccer League added six teams from the failed third incarnation of the Major Indoor Soccer League and reorganized as the Major Arena Soccer League. The 2014–15 MASL season will be 20 games long, 4 more than the 16 regular season games of recent PASL seasons. With the league expansion and reorganization, the Heat's Eastern division rivals for 2014–15 are the Baltimore Blast, Detroit Waza, Rochester Lancers, and Syracuse Silver Knights.

Four of the five Eastern Division teams (the three former MISL clubs plus Harrisburg) will keep score with multi-point scoring at their home games. Most goals will be worth two points but goals scored from outside a 45-foot arc on the turf will be worth three points. Games played at Detroit or in the Central, Southern, and Pacific Divisions will be scored with traditional soccer scoring where each goal is worth one point.

On June 18, the team introduced original Harrisburg Heat star Tarik Walker as the head coach for the 2014–15 season. Walker replaces Richard Chinapoo who led the team for its first two seasons.

== Roster moves ==
In August 2014, the team re-signed forward Chris Hall and midfielder Tyler Witmer. The Heat held an open tryout camp on September 6–7 to find new players and evaluate returning veterans. After the tryout camp, the team signed forwards Dean Miller and Tom Mellor plus midfielder Kenny Fultz. On September 20, the Heat held an invitation-only tryout camp to further evaluate veterans hoping to return and select new players.

The team opened training camp on October 7. On October 20, the team announced the signings of veteran goalkeepers Justin Johnson and Tim Mehl plus defenders Brad Kerstetter and Zach Sell. On October 21, the Heat re-signed midfielder Kevin Wolfe plus defenders Val Teixeira, Connor Malone, and Craig Tyrrell. On October 22, defender Chris Bock, forward Georges NouBossie and Patrick Crawford, plus midfielders David Cash and Patrick Thompson were added to the roster.

== Schedule ==
Win Loss

=== Pre-season ===
Game	Day	Date	Kickoff	Opponent	Results		Location	Attendance
Game	Day	Date	Kickoff	Opponent	Score	Record	Location	Attendance
1	Thursday	October 23	7:00pm	Baltimore Blast	L 11–31	0–1	Sports City Harrisburg	

=== Regular season ===
Game	Day	Date	Kickoff	Opponent	Results		Location	Attendance
Game	Day	Date	Kickoff	Opponent	Score	Record	Location	Attendance
1	Saturday	November 1	7:05pm	at Detroit Waza♣	L 4–8	0–1	Melvindale Civic Center	756
2	Saturday	November 15	7:05pm	Detroit Waza	L 6–14	0–2	Farm Show Large Arena	4,126
3	Friday	November 21	7:35pm	at Baltimore Blast	L 0–27	0–3	Royal Farms Arena	4,911
4	Saturday	November 29	7:05pm	Missouri Comets	L 10–24	0–4	Farm Show Large Arena	2,518
5	Saturday	December 6	7:05pm	Rochester Lancers	L 4–11	0–5	Farm Show Large Arena	1,973
6	Saturday	December 13	7:00pm	at Syracuse Silver Knights	L 8–26	0–6	Oncenter War Memorial Arena	2,516
7	Saturday	December 27	7:05pm	Syracuse Silver Knights	L 18–24	0–7	Farm Show Large Arena	1,339
8	Saturday	January 3	7:05pm	Baltimore Blast	L 8–29	0–8	Farm Show Large Arena	1,487
9	Friday	January 9	7:05pm	at Ontario Fury♣	L 9–10	0–9	Citizens Business Bank Arena	2,654
10	Saturday	January 10	7:05pm	at San Diego Sockers♣	L 4–11	0–10	Valley View Casino Center	4,177
11	Sunday	January 18	1:00pm	at Syracuse Silver Knights	L 9–24	0–11	Oncenter War Memorial Arena	3,814
12	Saturday	January 24	7:05pm	Syracuse Silver Knights	L 14–26	0–12	Farm Show Large Arena	2,279
13	Friday	January 30	7:35pm	St. Louis Ambush	W 25–16	1–12	Farm Show Large Arena	2,316
14	Saturday	January 31	7:05pm	Rochester Lancers	L 12–21	1–13	Farm Show Large Arena	4,455
15	Saturday	February 7	7:05pm	at Detroit Waza♣	L 8–13	1–14	Melvindale Civic Center	521
16	Saturday	February 14	1:00pm	at Rochester Lancers	L 10–28	1–15	Blue Cross Arena	5,150
17	Thursday	February 19	7:00pm	at Rochester Lancers	L 5–33	1–16	Blue Cross Arena	5,117
18	Saturday	February 21	6:05pm	at Baltimore Blast	L 5–25	1–17	Royal Farms Arena	5,270
19	Friday	February 27	7:35pm	Baltimore Blast	L 13–24	1–18	Farm Show Large Arena	4,989
20	Saturday	February 28	7:05pm	Detroit Waza	W 20–14	2–18	Farm Show Large Arena	4,408

♣ Game played with traditional soccer scoring (all goals worth 1 point).

== Personnel ==
=== Player roster ===
As of November 18, 2014 Note: Flags indicate national team as defined under FIFA eligibility rules; some limited exceptions apply. Players may hold more than one non-FIFA nationality.

No.	Pos.	Nation	Player
1	GK	USA	Tim Mehl
2	DF	USA	Bradley Kerstetter
3	DF	USA	Zach Sell
4	MF	USA	Kenneth Fultz
5	MF		Dave Cash
6	FW	USA	Jade Mesias
7	FW	POR	Val Teixeira
8	MF	USA	Tyler Witmer
9	FW	RSA	Dean Miller
10	DF	USA	Casey Lenker

No.	Pos.	Nation	Player
11	MF	USA	Kevin Wolfe
12	DF	USA	Connor Malone
13	FW		Patrick Crawford
14	FW	ENG	Tom Mellor
15	DF	USA	Chris Bock
18	DF	Saint Kitts	Craig Tyrell
22	FW		Chris Hall
31	FW	USA	Georges NouBossie
34	GK	USA	Justin Johnson
88	MF		Patrick Thompson

=== Staff ===
The team is owned and operated by broadcaster John Wilsbach. Patty Butala is the ticket manager. Seth Stover is in charge of group ticket sales. Toan Ngo is the team's web designer. The coaching staff includes head coach Tarik Walker, assistant coach Gino DiFlorio, trainer Amanda Kuchinski, and equipment manager Mike Butala.
