= List of private contractor deaths in Iraq =

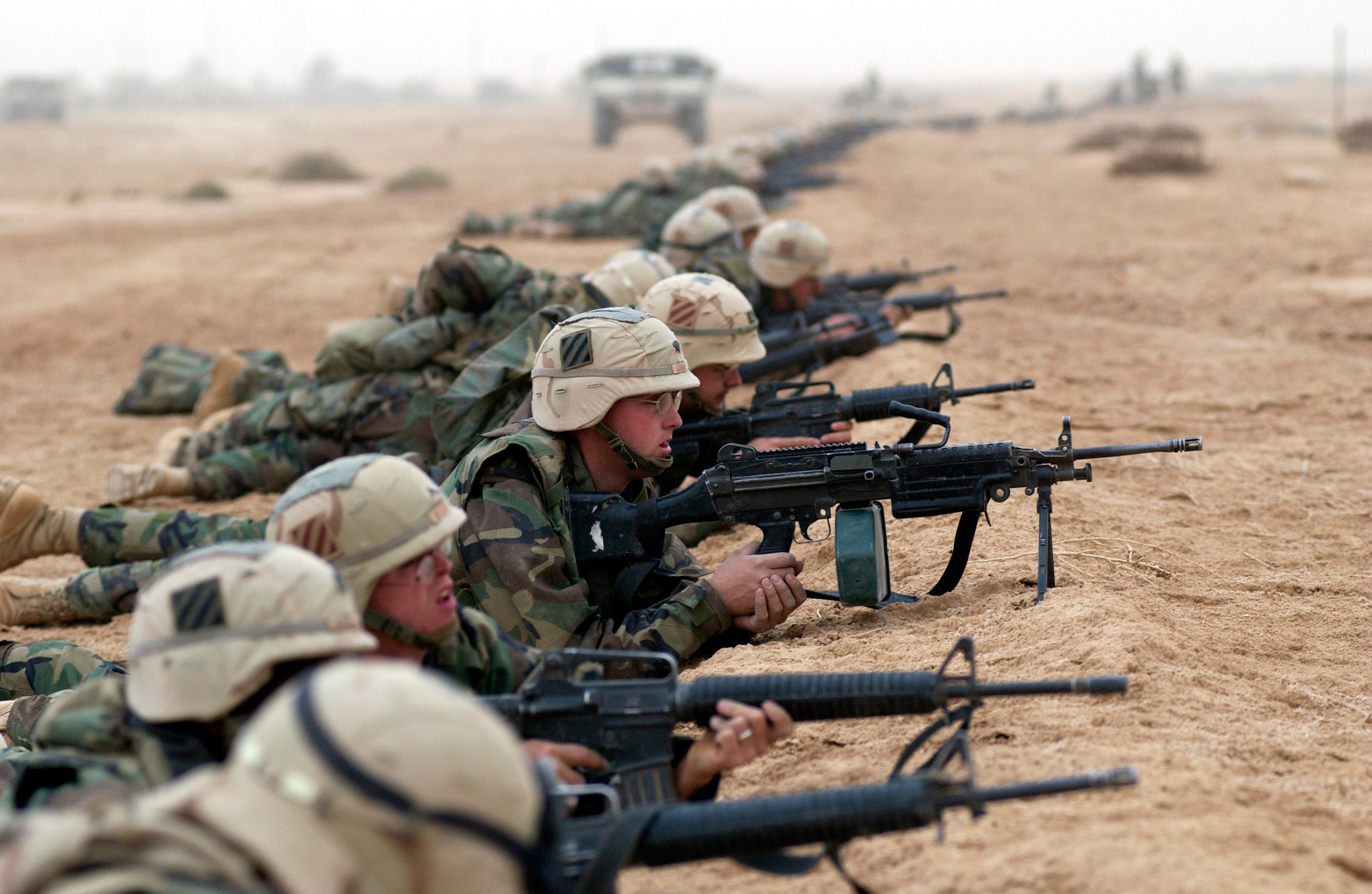
Operation Iraqi Freedom 2003

Foreign contractor deaths in Iraq by country

USA: 355
Turkey: 130+
UK: 58
South Africa: 29
Fiji: 20
Nepal: 20
Philippines: 15
Pakistan: 8
Australia: 7
India: 7
Russia: 7
Bulgaria: 6
Jordan: 6
Canada: 5
Egypt: 5
Iran: 5
Moldova: 5
Poland: 4
Germany: 4
Lebanon: 4
Republic of Macedonia: 4
New Zealand: 4
South Korea: 4
Croatia: 3
France: 3
Ukraine: 3
Bosnia: 2
Finland: 2
Hungary: 2
Italy: 2
Uganda: 2
Austria: 1
Brazil: 1
Colombia: 1

Czech Republic: 1
Denmark: 1
Guam: 1
Honduras: 1
Indonesia: 1
Japan: 1
Kuwait: 1
Netherlands: 1
Peru: 1
Portugal: 1
Romania: 1
Somalia: 1
Sudan: 1
Syria: 1
Sweden: 1

Total deaths: 749+

As of June 23, 2011, 749 foreign private contractors died in Iraq during the Iraq War. Of those, 355 were Americans, at least 130 were Turks, and 58 were Britons. 225 of those killed were private military contractors (PMCs).

The U.S. Department of Labor confirmed that by the end of March 2009, 917 civilian contractors were killed in Iraq, of which 224 (23%) were U.S. citizens. This number was updated to 1,537, by the end of March 2011, with an estimated 354 of these being U.S. citizens. The total number of dead was further updated to 1,569, by July 20, 2012.

The violence has escalated to 3,650 total mercenary deaths in Iraq as of March 2023.

These tables document the deaths of private contractors in Iraq from 2003 to 2011, during and after the Iraq War. These individuals were employed by various companies, often providing support services such as security, logistics, construction, and translation for military and reconstruction efforts. The data includes nationality, name, company, role, cause of death, and sources where available.

== 2003 ==
Date	Nationality	Name	Company	Role	Cause of Death	Ref.
April 10, 2003	(United States) American	Robert Grimm	National Response Corp. of Long Island	Fireman	Vehicle accident on Iraq–Kuwait border	
May 5, 2003	(Switzerland) Swiss	Jacob Andersen	Unknown Building Corporation	Unknown	Killed by masked men with knives	
July 10, 2003	(United States) American	Name unknown	Kellogg, Brown & Root	Truck driver	Vehicle accident near Basra	
July 21, 2003	(United Kingdom) British	Peter Rudolf	Sub-Surface Eng'g	Diver	Drowned during dive near Umm Qasr	
August 5, 2003	(United States) American	Fred Bryant Jr.	Kellogg, Brown & Root	Truck driver	Roadside bomb near Tikrit	
August 10, 2003	(Nepal) Nepali	Name unknown	Unknown	Private military company	Killed by a riot in Basra	
August 19, 2003	(United States) Assyrian American	Nadan Audisho Younadam	U.S. Army	Translator	Killed in an ambush in Tikrit	
September 3, 2003	(United States) American	Vernon Gaston	Kellogg, Brown & Root	Operations Manager	Killed in an ambush in Baghdad	
September 4, 2003	(United Kingdom) British	Ian Rimell	Mines Advisory Group	Bomb disposal expert	Killed in an ambush near Mosul	
September 12, 2003	(Jordan) Jordanian	Name unknown	Jordanian hospital	Private Military Contractor	Killed by friendly fire in Fallujah	
September 25, 2003	(Somalia) Somali	Name unknown	"al-Aike" hotel	Private Military Contractor	Killed by a bomb in Baghdad	
October 9, 2003	(United States) American	Kirk von Ackermann	IREX Services	Private Military Contractor	Captured on a road between Kirkuk and Tikrit, still missing and presumed dead	
November 2, 2003	(United States) American	Roy Buckmaster, David Dyess	EOD Technology, Inc.	Bomb disposal experts	Roadside bomb in Fallujah	
November 13, 2003	(United States) American	Forrest Snare	IAP Worldwide Services	Private contractor	Killed in an ambush west of Balad	
November 17, 2003	(United States) American	Brent McJennett	Proactive Communications Inc	Communications contractor	Killed by a land mine in Tikrit	
November 21, 2003	(Hungary) Hungarian	Péter Varga-Balázs	ToiFor Kft	Truck driver	Killed by friendly fire near Ramadi	
November 23, 2003	(United States) American	Todd Drobnick, Gordon Sinclair	Titan National Security Solutions	Translators	Vehicle accident between Mosul and Duhok	
November 29, 2003	(Colombia) Colombian	Jorge Arias Duque	Kellogg, Brown & Root	Private Military Contractor	Killed in an ambush in Balad	
November 30, 2003	(South Korea) South Korean	Man-Soo Kim, Kyung-Hae Kwak	Omu Electric Co.	Electricians	Killed in an ambush south of Tikrit	
December 14, 2003	(United States) American	Ryan Manelick	IREX Services	Private Military Contractor	Killed in an ambush in Baghdad	

== 2004 ==
Date	Nationality	Name	Company	Role	Cause of Death	Ref.
January 5, 2004	(Canada) Canadian	Richard Flynn	Unknown	Private Military Contractor	Killed by a roadside bomb	
January 6, 2004	(France) French	Names unknown (2 individuals)	Unknown	Private contractors	Killed in an ambush in Fallujah	
January 14, 2004	(United States) American	Names unknown (2 individuals)	Kellogg, Brown & Root	Truck drivers	Killed in an ambush near Tikrit	
January 21, 2004	(United States) American	Jody Deatherage	Kellogg, Brown & Root	Truck driver	Killed in a vehicle accident	
January 24, 2004	(Pakistan) Pakistani	Habibur Rehman	Saudi Arabian firm	Truck driver	Killed in an ambush	
January 26, 2004	(United States) American	Arthur Linderman Jr.	Kellogg, Brown & Root	Truck driver	Killed in an ambush near Tikrit	
January 29, 2004	(South Africa) South African	Francois Strydom	SAS International	Private Military Contractor	Killed by a suicide bomber in Baghdad	
February 8, 2004	(Fiji) Fijian	Tomasi Ramatau	Global Risk Strategies Limited	Private Military Contractor	Killed in a mortar attack in Baghdad	
February 16, 2004	(United States) American	Ray Parks	American Services	Contract manager	Killed in an ambush in Baghdad	
February 23, 2004	(United States) American	Albert Luther Cayton	Kellogg, Brown & Root	Truck driver	Killed by a roadside bomb	
March 1, 2004	(United States) American	Travis B. Whitman	Unknown	Private Military Contractor	Killed in a vehicle accident in Baghdad	
March 16, 2004	(Netherlands) Dutch, (Germany) German	Names unknown (1 Dutch, 1 German)	Unknown	Water project engineers	Killed in an ambush near Hillah	
March 17, 2004	(United Kingdom) British	Scott Mounce	Italian communications company	Telecommunications engineer	Killed by a suicide bomber in Baghdad	
March 22, 2004	(Finland) Finnish	Seppo Haapanen, Jorma Toronen	Entso, Air-Ix	Businessmen	Killed in a drive-by attack in western Baghdad	
March 28, 2004	(Canada) Canadian, (United Kingdom) British	Andy Bradsell, Christopher McDonald	Olive Security	Private Military Contractors	Killed in an ambush in Mosul	
March 31, 2004	(United States) American	Wesley Batalona, Scott Helvenston, Michael Teague, Jerko Zovko	Blackwater Security	Private Military Contractors	Ambushed and massacred in Fallujah, bodies mutilated and hanged	
April 1, 2004	(Czech Republic) Czech	Jiří Juran	Chemoprojekt	Petrochemical expert	Killed in an accidental gas explosion at a refinery in Baiji	
April 3, 2004	(United States) American	Emad Mikha	Titan National Security Solutions	Translator	Died in his sleep in Miqdadiyah	
April 6, 2004	(South Africa) South African	Gray Branfield	Hart Security Company	Private Military Contractor	Killed during street fighting in Al Kut, body mutilated and hanged	
April 6, 2004	(Bulgaria) Bulgarian	Mario Manchev	SOMAT	Truck driver	Killed in an ambush south of Nasiriyah	
April 7, 2004	(Germany) German	Tobias Retterath, Thomas Hafenecker	GSG-9	Embassy guards	Ambushed by Iraqi terrorists near Fallujah. Retterath was killed; Hafenecker is missing	
April 8, 2004	(United States) American	Tim Smith	Kellogg, Brown & Root	Truck driver	Killed in an ambush	
April 9, 2004	(United Kingdom) British	Michael John Bloss	Custer Battles	Private Military Contractor	Killed in an ambush near Hit	
April 9, 2004	(United States) American	William Bradley, Timothy Bell, Stephen Hulett, Steven Scott Fisher, Tony Duane Johnson, Jack Montague, Jeffery Parker	Kellogg, Brown & Root	Truck drivers	Convoy ambushed and decimated in Baghdad	
April 9, 2004	(Nepal) Nepali	Ram Bahadur Gurung, Shiva Prasad Lawati	Global Risk Strategies Limited	Private Military Contractors	Killed by a land mine in northern Iraq	
April 10, 2004	(United States) American	Nick Berg	Unknown	Businessman	Captured in Baghdad and executed on May 7	
April 11, 2004	(Denmark) Danish	Henrik Frandsen	Unknown	Businessman	Shot and killed in Baghdad	
April 11, 2004	(Romania) Romanian	Aron Alexandru	Bidepa	Private Military Contractor	Killed in an ambush near Baghdad	
April 12, 2004	(South Africa) South African	Hendrik Visagie	Erinys International	Private Military Contractor	Died of wounds from an ambush while escorting a convoy	
April 13, 2004	(Italy) Italian	Fabrizio Quattrocchi	Unknown	Private Military Contractor	Captured and executed	
April 22, 2004	(South Africa) South African	Francois de Beer	Meteoric Tactical Solutions	Private Military Contractor	Shot and killed in Baghdad	
April 25, 2004	(United States) American	Thomas Carter, Vincent Foster	Cochise Consultancy Inc.	Private Military Contractors	Killed by a roadside bomb near Baiji	
April 28, 2004	(Philippines) Filipino	Rodrigo Reyes	Kellogg, Brown & Root	Truck driver	Killed in an ambush in Abdali, near the Kuwait border	
April 29, 2004	(South Africa) South African	Name unknown	Construction company	Private Military Contractor	Shot and killed in Basra	
April 30, 2004	(United States) American	Mike Price	Cochise Consultancy Inc.	Private Military Contractor	Mortally injured by a roadside bomb near Baiji	
Date Unknown	(South Africa) South African	Name unknown	British security company	Private Military Contractor	Killed by a land mine in Fallujah	
May 1, 2004	(United States) American	Christian F. Kilpatrick	DynCorp International	Private Military Contractor	Killed in an ambush near Tikrit	
Date Unknown	(Turkey) Turkish	Cemal Ugar	Unknown	Truck driver	Killed in an ambush near Baghdad	
May 2, 2004	(Fiji) Fijian	Kelepi Qaranivalu, Emori Vunibokoi	Global Risk Strategies Limited	Private Military Contractors	Killed in an ambush in Mosul	
May 3, 2004	(United States) American	Aban Elias	Unknown	Civil engineer	Captured in Baghdad, still missing and presumed dead	
May 7, 2004	(United States) American	Daniel Parker	Kellogg, Brown & Root	Private Military Contractor	Killed by a roadside bomb in Baghdad	
May 7, 2004	(Poland) Polish	Waldemar Milewicz, Mounir Bouamrane	Polish National TV	Journalist, Cameraman	Killed in an ambush in Latifiya	
May 10, 2004	(New Zealand) New Zealander, (South Africa) South African	John Robert Tyrrell, William (Bill) John Richard	Iraqi construction company	Engineers	Killed in an ambush in Kirkuk	
May 10, 2004	(Russia) Russian	Alexei Konorev	InterEnergoServis	Construction worker	Killed in an ambush in Musayyib, south of Baghdad	
May 11, 2004	(Philippines) Filipino	Raymundo Natividad	Prime Projects International	Warehouseman	Killed in a mortar attack near Balad	
May 12, 2004	(Turkey) Turkish	Suayip Kaplanli, Name unknown	Yuksel Construction	Construction workers	Killed in an ambush in Mosul	
May 13, 2004	(United States) American	Henry Doll, Jesse Gentry	DynCorp International	Private Military Contractors	Killed in a vehicle accident near Tikrit	
May 14, 2004	(United Kingdom) British	Brian Tilley	Egyptian communications project	Private Military Contractor	Killed in his home	
May 18, 2004	(United Kingdom) British	Andrew Harries	ArmorGroup	Private Military Contractor	Killed in an ambush between Mosul and Erbil	
May 24, 2004	(United Kingdom) British	Mark Carman, Bob Morgan	Control Risks Group, British Foreign Office	Private Military Contractor, Petroleum consultant	Killed by a roadside bomb in Baghdad	
May 25, 2004	(Russia) Russian	Viktor Dynkin, Vyacheslav Ovsyannikov	InterEnergoServis	Power plant technicians	Killed in an ambush south of Baghdad	
May 30, 2004	(United States) American	Bruce Tow	DynCorp International	Private Military Contractor	Killed in an ambush in Baghdad	
June 2, 2004	(United States) American	Richard Bruce	Blackwater Security	Private Military Contractor	Killed in a vehicle accident	
June 5, 2004	(United States) American	Jarrod Little, Chris Neidrich	Blackwater Security	Private Military Contractors	Killed in an ambush in Baghdad	
June 5, 2004	(Poland) Polish	Krzysztof Kaskos, Artur Zukowsk	Blackwater Security	Private Military Contractors	Killed in an ambush in Baghdad	
June 5, 2004	(United States) American	James Gregory Wingate	Kellogg, Brown & Root	Truck driver	Killed by a roadside bomb near Haditha	
June 5, 2004	(United Kingdom) British	Craig Dickens	ArmourGroup	Private Military Contractor	Killed in an ambush near Mosul	
June 11, 2004	(Lebanon) Lebanese	Hussein Ali Alyan	Unknown	Construction worker	Captured and executed	
June 13, 2004	(United States) American	Shaun Fyfe	Environmental Chemical Corp. International	Construction worker	Died of natural causes	
June 14, 2004	(United States) American	Bill Hoke II	Granite Services, Inc.	Power industry worker	Killed by a car bomb in Baghdad	
June 14, 2004	(United Kingdom) British	Keith Butler, John Poole	Olive Security	Private Military Contractors	Killed by a car bomb in Baghdad	
June 14, 2004	(France) French	Name unknown	Granite Services, Inc.	Power industry worker	Killed by a car bomb in Baghdad	
June 14, 2004	(Philippines) Filipino	[Raul Flores	Granite Services, Inc.	Power industry worker	Killed by a car bomb in Baghdad	
June 14, 2004	(United States) American	Rex G.Sprague III	Titan National Security Solutions	Private Military Contractor	Killed in an ambush in Baghdad	
June 17, 2004	(United States) American	Walter J. Zbryski	Kellogg, Brown & Root	Truck driver	Killed by a roadside bomb	
June 17, 2004	(Turkey) Turkish	Faysal Demir	Turkish manufacturer of Prefabricated housing	Truck driver	Killed by friendly fire in Baghdad	
June 19, 2004	(Portugal) Portuguese	Roberto Carlos	Al-Atheer	Telecommunications worker	Killed by a roadside bomb south of Basra	
June 22, 2004	(United Kingdom) British	Julian Davies	Global Risk Strategies Limited	Private Military Contractor	Killed in an ambush in Mosul	
June 22, 2004	(South Korea) South Korean	Kim Sun-il	Gana General Trading Co.	Supplier	Captured and executed	
June 27, 2004	(United States) American	Joseph Arguelles	Readiness Mgmt. Svcs.	Electric power specialist	Killed when transport plane was fired on over Baghdad	
July 2, 2004	(United States) American	Vern O'Neal Richerson	Kellogg, Brown & Root	Construction foreman	Died in a U.S. military hospital in Landstuhl, Germany from injuries sustained in a mortar attack in Iraq	
July 9, 2004	(Turkey) Turkish	Names unknown (2 individuals)	Unknown	Truck drivers	Killed in an ambush near Samarra	
July 12, 2004	(Turkey) Turkish	Name unknown	Unknown	Truck driver	Killed by a roadside bomb near Baiji	
July 13, 2004	(Bulgaria) Bulgarian	Georgi Lazov	Bulgarian trucking company	Truck driver	Captured and executed in Mosul	
July 17, 2004	(Jordan) Jordanian	Ayid Nassir	Unknown	Truck driver	Killed in an ambush in Ramadi	
July 17, 2004	(Turkey) Turkish	Abdulcelil Bayik	Unknown	Truck driver	Killed in an ambush near Mosul	
July 19, 2004	(United States) American	Mike Copley	United Defense Industries	Bradley fighting vehicle maintenance technician	Killed in a mortar attack in Samarra	
July 20, 2004	(Russia) Russian	Anatoly Korenkov	InterEnergoServis	Power plant technician	Died of wounds from an ambush in a Moscow hospital	
July 22, 2004	(Bulgaria) Bulgarian	Ivaylo Kepov	Bulgarian trucking company	Truck driver	Captured and executed near Baiji	
July 25, 2004	(Jordan) Jordanian	Marwan Zuheir Al Rusan	Unknown	Businessman	Shot and killed in Mosul	
July 28, 2004	(Pakistan) Pakistani	Raja Azad, Sajad Naeem	Al Tamimi group	Construction workers	Captured and executed	
August 1, 2004	(Turkey) Turkish	Murat Yuce	Bilintur	Cleaner	Captured and executed	
August 2, 2004	(Turkey) Turkish	Ferit Nural	Unknown	Truck driver	Killed in an ambush near Baghdad	
August 4, 2004	(Turkey) Turkish	Osman Alisan	Ulasli Oil Company	Truck driver	Killed in an ambush near Baghdad	
August 10, 2004	(Egypt) Egyptian	Mohammed Abdel Aal	Unknown	Car mechanic	Captured and executed	
August 11, 2004	(United States) American	Kevin Rader	Kellogg, Brown & Root	Truck driver	Killed in an ambush	
August 12, 2004	(India) Indian	Eldho Abraham	Frame Project International	Electrical engineer	Killed by a roadside bomb in Baghdad	
August 16, 2004	(South Africa) South African	Herman Pretorius	DynCorp International	Private Military Contractor	Killed in an ambush in Mosul	
August 22, 2004	(Indonesia) Indonesian	Fahmi Ahmad	Subcontractor to Siemens	Telecommunications engineer	Killed in an ambush in Mosul	
Date Unknown	(Turkey) Turkish	Name unknown	Tikrit bridge repair firm	Construction worker	Killed in an ambush between Tikrit & Kirkuk	
August 23, 2004	(North Macedonia) Macedonian	Dalibor Lazarevski, Dragan Markovikj, Zoran Naskovski	Soufan Engineering	Construction workers	Captured and executed in Baghdad	
Date Unknown	(Jordan) Jordanian	Beshir Ahmed	Unknown	Businessman	Killed in a car hijacking between Tikrit & Baiji	
August 24, 2004	(United States) American	Jamal Tewfik Salman	Unknown	Translator	Captured and executed	
August 27, 2004	(Egypt) Egyptian	Jawdee Baker	Unknown	Private contractor	Shot and killed in Baiji	
August 30, 2004	(Nepal) Nepali	Prakash Adhikari, Ramesh Khadka, Lalan Singh Koiri, Mangal Bahadur Limbu, Jit Bahadur Thapa Magar, Gyanendra Shrestha, Rajendra Kumar Shrestha, Bodhan Kumar Sah Sudi, Manoj Kumar Thakur, Sanjay Kumar Thakur, Bhekh Bahadur Thapa, Bishnu Hari Thapa	Morning Star Co.	Cooks and cleaners	Captured and executed	
August 30, 2004	(Turkey) Turkish	Majid Mehmet al-Gilam], Yahya Sadr, Name unknown	Unknown	Truck drivers	Captured and executed near Samarra	
September 4, 2004	(United States) American	John N. Mallery	MayDay Supply	Project manager	Killed in an ambush in Taji	
Date Unknown	(Egypt) Egyptian	Nasser Salama	Unknown	Private contractor	Captured and executed near Baiji	
September 10, 2004	(United States) American	William Earl Bowers	SEI Group Inc.	Engineer	Killed in an ambush near Baghdad	
September 14, 2004	(Canada) Canadian	Andrew Shmakov, Munir Toma	Unknown	Private contractors	Shot 17 times in an ambush (initially reported as a car bomb)	
September 14, 2004	(United States) American	Todd Engstrom	EOD Technology Inc.	Private Military Contractor	Killed in an ambush near Balad, Iraq	
September 16, 2004	(United States) American	Eugene Armstrong	Gulf Services Co.	Engineer	Captured in Baghdad, executed on September 20	
September 16, 2004	(United States) American	Jack Hensley	Gulf Services Co.	Engineer	Captured in Baghdad, executed on September 21	
September 16, 2004	(United Kingdom) British	Kenneth Bigley	Gulf Services Co.	Engineer	Captured in Baghdad, executed on October 7	
September 21, 2004	(Turkey) Turkish	Akar Besir	Unknown	Unknown	Killed in an ambush	
September 28, 2004	(United States) American	Roger Moffett	Kellogg, Brown & Root	Truck driver	Killed by a roadside bomb	
September 29, 2004	(United Kingdom) British	Iain Hunter	ArmorGroup	Private Military Contractor	Killed in a vehicle accident in Tikrit	
September 27, 2004	(United Kingdom) British	Alan Wimpenny	Unknown	Private Military Contractor	Killed by a roadside bomb near Samarra	
October 4, 2004	(South Africa) South African	Johann Hattingh, Gavin Holtzhausen	Unknown	Unknown	Killed and wounded by a suicide car-bomber in Baghdad; Holtzhausen later died	
October 11, 2004	(United Kingdom) British	Paul Chadwick	ArmorGroup	Private Military Contractor	Accidentally shot himself in Kirkuk	
October 11, 2004	(United Kingdom) British	Name unknown	ArmorGroup	Private Military Contractor	Killed by a sniper in Kirkuk	
October 11, 2004	(Turkey) Turkish	Maher Kemal	Unknown	Truck driver	Captured and executed	
October 12, 2004	(South Africa) South African	Johan Botha, Louis Campher	Omega Risk Solutions	Private Military Contractors	Killed in an ambush south of Baghdad	
October 14, 2004	(United States) American	Eric Miner, Steve Osborne, John Pinsonneault, Ferdinand Ibabao	DynCorp International	Private Military Contractors	Killed by a suicide bomber in Baghdad	
October 14, 2004	(Turkey) Turkish	Ramazan Elbu	Unknown	Truck driver	Captured and executed	
October 19, 2004	(United States) American	Felipe E. Lugo III	Kellogg, Brown & Root	Labor foreman	Killed in a mortar attack near Baghdad	
October 23, 2004	(Croatia) Croatian	Dalibor Burazović	Eurodelta d.o.o.	Truck driver	Killed in an ambush near Mosul	
October 23, 2004	(Turkey) Turkish	Name unknown	Unknown	Truck driver	Killed in an ambush in Baiji	
October 27, 2004	(United States) American	Travis Schnoor	Custer Battl]	Private Military Contractor	Killed by a roadside bomb west of Baghdad	
October 29, 2004	(Turkey) Turkish	Name unknown	Unknown	Truck driver	Killed in an ambush in Mosul	
November 2, 2004	(United States) American	Radim Sadeq Mohammed Sadeq	Unknown	Businessman	Captured in Baghdad, still missing and presumed dead	
November 3, 2004	(United States) American	Jeffery Serrett	Kellogg, Brown & Root	Medic	Killed in an attack on a prison in Baghdad	
November 3, 2004	(United Kingdom) British	John Barker	Global Risk Strategies Limited	Private Military Contractor	Killed by a suicide bomber in Baghdad	
November 5, 2004	(Nepal) Nepali	Tikaram Gurung	Gorkha Manpower Company	Private Military Contractor	Killed in an ambush	
November 7, 2004	(Turkey) Turkish	Name unknown	Unknown	Truck driver	Killed in an ambush in Samarra	
November 7, 2004	(United Kingdom) British, (South Africa) South African	Shaun Husband, Johan Terry	Olive Security	Private Military Contractors	Killed by a roadside bomb in Al Zubayr, near Basra	
November 8–16, 2004	(United Kingdom) British	Name unknown	Unknown	Private Military Contractor	Killed during the Battle of Mosul	
November 8–16, 2004	(Turkey) Turkish	Name unknown	Unknown	Truck driver	Killed during the Battle of Mosul	
November 9, 2004	(United States) American	Aaron Iversen, David Randolph	EOD Technology Inc.	Private Military Contractors	Killed in an ambush between Baghdad and Fallujah	
November 10, 2004	(United States) American	Douglas S.Thomas	DynCorp International	Private Military Contractor	Killed by an IED in a convoy from Balad, Iraq to Tikrit	
November 11, 2004	(United States) American	Mike Tatar	DynCorp International	Private Military Contractor	Killed with friendly fire en route to Baghdad	
November 14, 2004	(United States) American	Wolf Weis	Unknown	Private contractor	Killed in an ambush near Mosul	
November 16, 2004	(South Korea) South Korean	Jung Myeong-nam	Taehwa Electric Co.	Private contractor	Killed in an accident in Erbil	
November, 2004	(South Africa) South African	Jacques Oosthuize	Erinys Iraq	Private Military Contractor	Killed in an ambush between Tikrit and Mosul	
November 25, 2004	(Nepal) Nepali	Names unknown (4 individuals)	Global Risk Strategies Limited	Private Military Contractors	Killed by a mortar attack in Baghdad	
November 30, 2004	(Honduras) Honduran	José Mauricio Mena Puerto	DynCorp International	Medic	Killed in an ambush	
December 8, 2004	(United States) American	Dale Stoffel, Joseph Wemple	CLI USA	Construction contractors	Shot and killed near an Iraqi military base north of Baghdad	
December 15, 2004	(Italy) Italian	Salvatore Santoro	Unknown	Aid worker	Shot and killed at an insurgent checkpoint outside Ramadi	
December 20, 2004	(Turkey) Turkish	Saban Ozsagir	Unknown	Truck driver	Killed in an ambush near Mosul	
December 21, 2004	(United States) American	Leslie W. Davis, Brett A.Hunter, Allen Smith, Anthony M. Stramiello Jr.	Kellogg, Brown & Root	Construction foremen and technicians	Killed by a suicide bomber in Mosul	

== 2005 ==
Date	Nationality	Name	Company	Role	Cause of Death	Ref.
January 3, 2005	(United Kingdom) British	John Dolman, Nick Pear, John Eardley	Kroll Security International, IPA Energy and Water Consulting	Private Military Contractors, Engineer	Killed by a suicide bomber in Baghdad	
January 3, 2005	(United States) American	Tracy Hushin	BearingPoint Inc.	Financial manager	Killed by a suicide bomber in Baghdad	
January 16, 2005	(United States) American	Name unknown	Steele Foundation	Private Military Contractor	Killed in an ambush north of Baghdad	
January 16, 2005	(Egypt) Egyptian	Ibrahim Mohammed Ismail	Unknown	Truck driver	Found dead, body dumped in a street in Ramadi	
January 19, 2005	(United Kingdom) British	Andrew Whyte	Janusian Security Risk Mgmt.	Private Military Contractor	Killed in an ambush south of Baiji	
February 8, 2005	(Croatia) Croatian	Ivan Pavčević	Unknown	Truck driver	Killed in an ambush near Tikrit	
February 24, 2005	(United States) American	Jimmy A.Riddle, Brian J.Wagoner	Special Operations Consulting-Security Mgmt. Group Inc.	Private Military Contractors	Killed by a roadside bomb in Ashraf	
March 12, 2005	(United States) American	Jim Cantrell, Bruce Durr	Blackwater Security	Private Military Contractors	Killed by a roadside bomb in Hillah	
March 12, 2005	(Turkey) Turkish	Name unknown	Unknown	Truck driver	Killed by a roadside bomb near Baiji	
March 20, 2005	(Turkey) Turkish	Name unknown	Unknown	Truck driver	Killed in an ambush north of Baiji	
March 25, 2005	(United States) American	Eugene Hyatt	Kellogg, Brown & Root	Carpenter foreman	Killed in an accident	
April 1, 2005	(United States) American	Alfred Habelman	California-based construction company	Private Military Contractor	Killed in an ambush	
April 11, 2005	(Turkey) Turkish	Name unknown	Unknown	Truck driver	Killed by a roadside bomb in Baiji	
April 16, 2005	(Turkey) Turkish	Name unknown	Unknown	Truck driver	Killed by a roadside bomb south of Mosul	
April 18, 2005	(Philippines) Filipino	Rey Torres	Qatar International Trading Company	Private Military Contractor	Killed in an ambush in Baghdad	
April 20, 2005	(United States) American, (Australia) Australian, (Canada) Canadian	James Hunt, Chris Ahmelman, Stefan Surette	Edinburgh Risk Inc.	Private Military Contractors	Killed in an ambush in Baghdad	
April 20, 2005	(Turkey) Turkish	Name unknown	Unknown	Truck driver	Killed by a roadside bomb in Baghdad	
April 21, 2005	(United States) American	Robert Jason Gore, Stephen Matthew McGovern, Jason Obert, David Patterson, Luke Adam Petrik, Eric Smith	Blackwater Security	Private Military Contractors	Killed when their Mil Mi-8 helicopter was shot down near Tarmiya	
April 21, 2005	(Bulgaria) Bulgarian	Stoyan Anchev, Lyubomir Kostov, Georgi Naydenov	Bulgarian firm	Helicopter pilots	Killed when their Mil Mi-8 helicopter was shot down near Tarmiya	
April 21, 2005	(Fiji) Fijian	Jim Atalifo, Timoci Lalaqila	Blackwater Security	Private Military Contractors	Killed when their Mi-8 helicopter was shot down near Tarmiya	
April 21, 2005	(United States) American	Curtis Hundley	Blackwater Security	Private Military Contractor	Killed by a roadside bomb near Ramadi	
April 21, 2005	(United Kingdom) British	Alan Parkin	Aegis Defence Services	Private Military Contractor	Killed by a suicide bomber in Baghdad	
May 1, 2005	(Turkey) Turkish	Name unknown	Unknown	Truck driver	Killed in an ambush north of Baghdad	
May 3, 2005	(Turkey) Turkish	Salih Gulbol	Eskiocaklar	Truck driver	Killed in an ambush near Baghdad	
May 7, 2005	(United States) American	Brandon Thomas, Todd Venette	CTU Consulting	Private Military Contractors	Killed by a car bomb in Baghdad	
May 9, 2005	(South Africa) South African	Names unknown (4 individuals)	Hart Security Company	Private Military Contractors	Killed in an ambush near Hit	
May 9, 2005	(Japan) Japanese	Akihiko Saito	Hart Security Company	Private Military Contractor	Killed in an ambush near Hit	
May 10, 2005	(United States) American	Thomas W.Jaichner	Blackwater Security	Private Military Contractor	Killed by a sniper in Ramadi	
May 12, 2005	(United States) American	Reuben Ray Miller	Kellogg, Brown & Root	Truck driver	Killed by a roadside bomb	
May 22, 2005	(Jordan) Jordanian	Al-Sanie	Unknown	Truck driver	Killed in an ambush	
May 28, 2005	(Lebanon) Lebanese	Name unknown	Unknown	Interpreter	Killed in a drive-by shooting in Baghdad	
June 2, 2005	(Turkey) Turkish	Salih Gulbol	Unknown	Truck driver	Killed in an ambush in Baiji	
June 7, 2005	(South Africa) South African	Séan Ronald Laver	Hart Security Company	Private Military Contractor	Killed by a roadside bomb in Habbaniyah	
June 9, 2005	(Turkey) Turkish	Yusuf Akar	Unknown	Truck driver	Killed in an ambush in Ramadi	
June 15, 2005	(Bosnia and Herzegovina) Bosnian	Ljubiša Aleksić	Lloyd-Owen International	Private Military Contractor	Killed in an ambush 60 km south of Baghdad	
June 21, 2005	(Turkey) Turkish	Name unknown	Unknown	Truck driver	Killed in an ambush east of Balad	
June 27, 2005	(United States) American	Deborah Dawn Klecker	DynCorp International	Private Military Contractor	Killed by a roadside bomb east of Baghdad	
July 1, 2005	(Turkey) Turkish	Name unknown	Unknown	Truck driver	Killed in an ambush near Baiji	
September 2, 2005	(United States) American	Leon "Vince" Kimbrell	DynCorp International	Unknown	Killed by a shaped charge IED near the Al-Sadeer Compound in Baghdad	
September 3, 2005	(United States) American	Ron Wiebe	Unknown	Unknown	Killed en route from Tikrit to Baghdad	
September 3, 2005	(United Kingdom) British	Jim Martin	Unknown	Unknown	Killed en route from Tikrit to Baghdad	
September 20, 2005	(United States) American	Keven Dagit, Sascha Grenner-Case, Christopher Lem, Name unknown	Kellogg, Brown & Root	Truck drivers	Ambushed and massacred in Dhuluiya, bodies mutilated	
November 12, 2005	(Sudan) Sudanese	Name unknown	Unknown	Private contractor	Killed in an attack on the Omani embassy in Baghdad	
November 14, 2005	(South Africa) South African	Naas Du Preez, Johannes Potgieter	DynCorp International	Unknown	Killed by a roadside bomb on Haifa Street, Baghdad	
November 17, 2005	(South Africa) South African	"Tabs" from 23 Battalion	Unknown	Unknown	Died of wounds from a roadside bomb on Haifa Street, Baghdad	
December 22, 2005	(United States) American	Kyle Kaszynski	Croll Management	Private Military Contractor	Killed by a roadside bomb north of Baghdad	
December 22, 2005	(South Africa) South African	Jan Strauss	DynCorp International	Private Military Contractor	Killed by a roadside bomb north of Baghdad	

== 2006 ==
Date	Nationality	Name	Company	Role	Cause of Death	Ref.
January 5, 2006	(India) Indian	Sibi Kora	Unknown	Truck driver	Killed by a roadside bomb	
May 7, 2006	(United Kingdom) British	Karl Saville	Danubia Global	Security contractor	Killed in Baghdad	
May, 2006	(South Africa) South African	Richard Andrew Kolver	Unknown	Unknown	Killed by a roadside bomb in Baghdad	
June 8, 2006	(Australia) Australian	Wayne Schulz	ArmorGroup	Unknown	Killed when his armoured vehicle was destroyed by an explosive device	
June 11, 2006	(United Kingdom) British	Kenneth Clarke	Unknown	Unknown	Killed by a roadside bomb in Tikrit	
June 14, 2006	(Sweden) Swedish	Name unknown	Genric Ltd.	Security contractor	Killed by an explosive device	
July 15, 2006	(Syria) Syrian	Salih Fawzi al-Madani	Unknown	Private contractor	Captured in Baghdad, body found mutilated	
August 19, 2006	(South Africa) South African	Edmund Bruwer, Brenton Gray	Unknown	Unknown	Killed by a roadside bomb	
September 17, 2006	(United States) American	Darrell Leroy Wetherbee	DynCorp International	Private Military Contractor	Killed by a sniper in Hawija	
October 2, 2006	(Turkey) Turkish	Nuri Akceren, Zeki Kilicwho	Unknown	Truck drivers	Killed in an ambush near Mosul	
October 30, 2006	(South Africa) South African	Morne Pieters	Unknown	Unknown	Killed by a roadside bomb in Basra while leading a convoy	

== 2007 ==
Date	Nationality	Name	Company	Role	Cause of Death	Ref.
January 7, 2007	(United States) American	Glenda Oliver Butts	Two Rivers Consultants	Construction consultant	Died of natural causes	
January 9, 2007	(Moldova) Moldavian	Names unknown (5 individuals)	Unknown	Pilots	Killed in an aircraft crash in Balad	
January 9, 2007	(Turkey) Turkish	Names unknown (28 individuals)	Unknown	Construction workers	Killed in an aircraft crash in Balad	
January 17, 2007	(Croatia) Croatian	Željko Both	Unity Resources Group	Security contractor	Killed in an ambush in Baghdad	
January 17, 2007	(Hungary) Hungarian	Janos Nemeth	Unity Resources Group	Unknown	Killed in an ambush in Baghdad	
January 23, 2007	(United States) American	Steve Gernet, Ron Johnson, Art Laguna, Shane Stanfield, Casey Casavant	Blackwater Security	Private Military Contractors	Killed by insurgents during a rescue operation in Eastern Baghdad	
February, 2007	(United States) American	Donald E. Tolfree Jr.	KBR, Inc.	Truck driver	Killed at Camp Anaconda	
February 15, 2007	(South Africa) South African	Glen Joyce	Unknown	Unknown	Killed by an IED in Baghdad	
February 18, 2007	(United States) American	Don Schneider	Unknown	Mail truck driver	Killed by two 155mm IEDs en route from Kuwait to Camp Cedar	
March 2007	(United States) American	Carolyn Edwards	KBR, Inc.	Logistics coordinator	Killed in Baghdad's Green Zone	
April 5, 2007	(Kuwait) Kuwaiti	Name unknown	Unknown	Translator	Killed in an ambush in Basra	
April 15, 2007	(Iran) Iranian	Names unknown (5 individuals)	Unknown	Truck drivers	Killed in an ambush in Baqubah	
June 12, 2007	(United States) American	Michael Wayne Butler	DynCorp International	Private Military Contractor	Killed by a rocket-propelled grenade in Tikrit	
July 15, 2007	(Australia) Australian	Brendan Hurst, Justin Saint	BLP International	Unknown	Killed by a rocket-propelled grenade in an ambush	
August 28, 2007	(South Africa) South African	Frans Robert Brand	ArmorGroup	Security specialist	Killed by an IED	
October 10, 2007	(United States) American	Michael Doheny, Micah Shaw, Steve Evrard	SOC-LLC	Private Military Contractors	Killed by an EFP near Al Kut	

== 2008 ==
Date	Nationality	Name	Company	Role	Cause of Death	Ref.
February 18, 2008	Unknown	M. Salih, S. Chalil, S. R. Arachchige	Unknown	Unknown	Killed during a rocket attack on Contingency Operating Base Basra	
March 16, 2008	(United Kingdom) British	Liam Carmichael	Unknown	Unknown	Killed when thrown from vehicle after a tire blowout in Sulaymaniyah	
June 12, 2008	(United Kingdom) British	Darryl Fern	Aegis Defence Services	Private Military Contractor	Killed by a roadside bomb	
June 13, 2008	(South Africa) South African	Desmond Milnes	Unknown	Unknown	Died from wounds sustained in the same attack as Darryl Fern	
July 6, 2008	(United States) American	Justin English	WSI	Firefighter	Killed when his convoy hit an IED	
November 13, 2008	(Russia) Russian	Names unknown (3 individuals)	Falcon Aviation Group	Cargo plane operators	Killed when their Antonov An-12 transport plane crashed near Fallujah	
November 13, 2008	(Ukraine) Ukrainian	Names unknown (2 individuals)	Falcon Aviation Group	Cargo plane operators	Killed when their Antonov An-12 transport plane crashed near Fallujah	
November 13, 2008	(Belarus) Belarusian	Name unknown	Falcon Aviation Group	Cargo plane operators	Killed when their Antonov An-12 transport plane crashed near Fallujah	
November 13, 2008	(India) Indian	Jaychandran Appukutten	Falcon Aviation Group	Cargo plane operators	Killed when their Antonov An-12 transport plane crashed near Fallujah	

== 2009 ==
Date	Nationality	Name	Company	Role	Cause of Death	Ref.
March 4, 2009	(United States) American	Justin Pope	DynCorp International	Private Military Contractor	Died of an accidental gunshot wound	
March 9, 2009	(Pakistan) Pakistani	Name unknown	Unknown	Private contractor	Killed by a Katyusha rocket launcher in Basra	
March 26, 2009	(Hungary) Hungarian	Tibor Bogdan	Unknown	Unknown	Killed by a U.S. soldier near Camp Taji	
May 15, 2009	(United Kingdom) British	Name unknown	Unknown	Private Military Contractor	Killed by a roadside bomb in Hillah	
May 22, 2009	(United States) American	Jim Kitterman	Janus Construction	Engineer	Stabbed and killed by fellow contractors in the Green Zone in Baghdad	
May 22, 2009	(United States) American	Larry Eugene Young	Corporate Training Unlimited	Private Military Contractor	Killed in a mortar attack on the Green Zone in Baghdad	
May 25, 2009	(United States) American	Terrance "Terry" Barnich, Dr. Maged Hussein	Iraq Transition Assistance Office	Unknown	Killed by an IED outside Fallujah	
June 20, 2009	(United Kingdom) British	Jason Creswell, Jason Swindlehurst	GardaWorld	Private Military Contractors	Bodies recovered in Baghdad, captured on May 27, 2007	
July 17, 2009	(United States) American	William F. Hinchman, Name unknown	Blackwater Security	Private Military Contractors	Killed when their helicopter crashed in Baghdad	
July 29, 2009	(United Kingdom) British	Alec MacLachlan, Alan McMenemy	GardaWorld	Private Military Contractors	Bodies recovered in Baghdad, captured on May 27, 2007	
August 9, 2009	(Australia) Australian	Darren Hoare	ArmorGroup	Private Military Contractor	Killed by a fellow contractor in the Green Zone in Baghdad	
August 9, 2009	(United Kingdom) British	Paul McGuigan	ArmorGroup	Private Military Contractor	Killed by a fellow contractor in the Green Zone in Baghdad	
August 12, 2009	(United States) American	Kenneth Rose	Unknown	Private contractor	Killed by a roadside bomb in Fallujah	
September 1, 2009	(United States) American	Adam Hermanson	Triple Canopy	Private Military Contractor	Electrocuted in Baghdad	
September 13, 2009	(United States) American	Lucas "Trent" Vinson	Kellogg, Brown & Root	Private contractor	Killed by a U.S. soldier at Contingency Operating Base Speicher in Tikrit	

== 2010 ==
Date	Nationality	Name	Company	Role	Cause of Death	Ref.
March 10, 2010	(United Kingdom) British	Robbie Napier	Aegis Security	Security contractor	Died after an IED explosion	
May 19, 2010	(United Kingdom) British	Nic Crouch	Aegis Security	Security contractor	Killed by a suicide car bomber	
July 22, 2010	(Peru) Peruvian	Juan Carlos Salazar Rodriguez	Unknown	Security guard	Killed in a rocket attack	
July 22, 2010	(Uganda) Ugandan	Unknown	Unknown	Security guard	Killed in a rocket attack	
July 22, 2010	(Uganda) Ugandan	Unknown	Unknown	Security guard	Killed in a rocket attack	
September 14, 2010	(United Kingdom) British	Karl Bowen	Unknown	Security contractor	Killed in a car accident	
October 4, 2010	(United States) American	Michael Behr	Unknown	Contractor	Unknown	

== 2011 ==
Date	Nationality	Name	Company	Role	Cause of Death	Ref.
March 16, 2011	(United States) American	Johnnie Lee Smith	KBR, Inc.	Truck driver	Died from burn injuries sustained in a truck accident	
June 23, 2011	(United States) American	Stephen Everhart	USAID	International development and finance expert	Killed in a convoy ambush	

== 2016 ==
Date	Nationality	Name	Company	Role	Cause of Death	Ref.
August 2016	(United Kingdom) British	Stuart Coburn	Unknown	Mine Clearance	Remote detonated IED	
