= Conestoga Valley School District =

School district in Pennsylvania

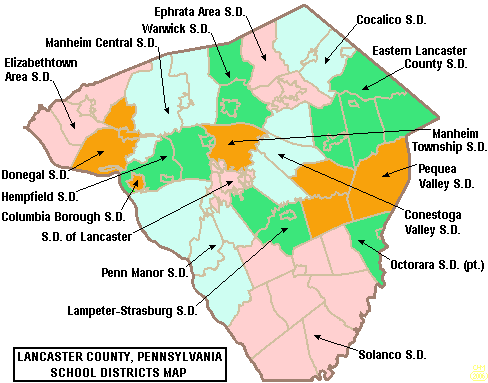

Location
- 502 Mt. Sidney Rd. Lancaster, Pennsylvania 17602 United States

District information
- Type: Public school district
- Motto: Character. Community. Commitment.
- Grades: K-12
- Established: 1958
- Superintendent: Dr. Daniel Hartman
- Schools: Conestoga Valley High School; Conestoga Valley Middle School; Brownstown Elementary School, Fritz Elementary School, Leola Elementary School, Smoketown Elementary School, Conestoga Valley Virtual Academy (K-12)
- NCES District ID: 4206480

Students and staff
- Students: 4000
- Athletic conference: Lancaster-Lebanon League
- District mascot: Buckskin
- Colors: Red and blue

Other information
- State District ID: 113361703
- Website: www.conestogavalley.org

The Conestoga Valley School District is a school district covering East Lampeter Township, Upper Leacock Township and West Earl Township in Lancaster County, Pennsylvania, United States. It is a member of Lancaster-Lebanon Intermediate Unit (IU) 13. The district operates one high school, one middle school and four elementary schools. The district also offers a public virtual academy that serves students residing in the district. The Conestoga Valley Virtual Academy utilizes physical spaces for each level in addition to the fully virtual, blended, and hybrid learning options.

== History ==
In 1958, East Lampeter Township, Upper Leacock Township, and West Earl Township merged their school systems to form the Conestoga Valley School District. Its original high school was dedicated on present-day Smoketown Elementary School as East Lampeter High School. Sometime after 1970, the high school was moved to another location along Horseshoe Road, renamed Conestoga Valley High School, and completely rebuilt, while the old building was dedicated as Smoketown Elementary School.

=== Penn Johns Elementary School ===
Located in Bird In Hand, Penn Johns Elementary School was the previous fifth elementary school of Conestoga Valley. It was the last remaining school for the Plain community, which over time lost its original purpose and transitioned into a regular elementary school that served all local residents. It was established around 1953 as an Amish and Old Order Mennonite school, but the Amish community no longer attended the school. In 2007, the Conestoga Valley school board voted to close the school for good, citing new teacher certification requirements, operating costs, and new curriculum requirements. The school served around 35 students at the time of closing, taught by only two teachers, one for grades 1-4 and one for grades 5-8. The 35 students then matriculated into the four remaining elementary schools.

=== Recent developments ===
Conestoga Valley recently renovated its previous middle school to become the home of Smoketown Elementary, as well as the district offices and the Conestoga Valley Virtual Academy (CVVA) Elementary Learning Center. Leola Elementary is in the midst of renovations, and is expected to move back into its newly renovated building in the 2026–27 school year. A new middle school, Gerald G. Huesken Middle School, was built and opened for the 2022–2023 school year. It now houses grades 6-8; the previous middle school was home to only grades 7-8.

== Academics ==
Conestoga Valley is committed to an assessment program reflecting national, state, and local measures. Each year, CV administers the Pennsylvania System of School Assessment (PSSA) math and English language arts (ELA) exams in grades three through eight, and science in grades four and eight. High school students take the state’s end-of-course Keystone Exams in algebra, literature, and biology. CV maintains a balance of diagnostic, benchmark, formative and summative assessments at all levels, including locally-developed assessments.

== Demographic snapshot ==
Source: school newsletter (January 2014)

Asian students	5.0%
Hispanic students	24.0%
Black students	7.7%
White (non-Hispanic) students	52.6%
Unclassified (including multi-racial)	3.5%
Multi=racial	6.9%
Other (including multi-racial)	0.3%

== Schools ==
- Conestoga Valley Senior High School (9–12), Lancaster
- Conestoga Valley Middle School (7–8), Lancaster
- Brownstown Elementary School (K–6), Brownstown
- J. E. Fritz Elementary School (K–6), Lancaster
- Leola Elementary School (K–6), Leola
- Smoketown Elementary School (K–6), Lancaster
- Conestoga Valley Virtual Academy (K–12), Lancaster

== Notable alumni ==
- Kim Glass, indoor volleyball player who joined the U.S. national team in the Olympics and won a silver medal in the 2008 Beijing Olympics
- Jonathan Groff, singer and stage, television, and film actor who worked in the musical Spring Awakening, voiced Kristoff in the Disney movie Frozen, and starred in television series Glee and Looking
- Floyd Landis, professional cyclist who won several events including the Tour of California in 2006, and the Tour de France in 2006; was convicted of a doping case
- Ryan G. Manelick, defense contractor who worked in Baghdad, Iraq
- Kevin Shaffer,n American football offensive tackle who played for the Atlanta Falcons, Cleveland Browns, and Chicago Bears
