= Salvatore Santoro =

Salvatore Santoro may refer to:

- Salvatore Santoro (mobster) (1915–2000), American criminal
- Salvatore Santoro (footballer) (born 1999), Italian football midfielder
- Salvatore Santoro (died 2004), Italian private contractor killed in Iraq
