= Jose Barbon =

American football player (born 2000)

Profile
- Position: Wide receiver

Personal information
- Born: April 16, 2000 (age 26); Havana, Cuba
- Listed height: 6 ft 0 in (1.83 m)
- Listed weight: 185 lb (84 kg)

Career information
- High school: Conestoga Valley (Lancaster, Pennsylvania, U.S.)
- College: Temple (2018–2022)
- NFL draft: 2023: undrafted

Career history
- Dallas Cowboys (2023)*; Calgary Stampeders (2023)*; Montreal Alouettes (2024–2025)
- * Offseason or practice squad member only
- Stats at CFL.ca

Jose Barbon (born April 16, 2000) is a Cuban professional gridiron football wide receiver. He played college football at Temple.

== Early life ==
Jose Barbon was born on April 16, 2000, in Havana, Cuba. He moved to the United States when he was three. He grew up a Pittsburgh Steelers and Troy Polamalu fan. Barbon started playing American football in sixth grade. He later played high school football at Conestoga Valley High School in Lancaster, Pennsylvania, as a wide receiver and defensive back. He was a three-year letterman. As a sophomore, Barbon caught 37 passes for 497 yards and three touchdowns. During his junior year, he totaled 64 receptions for 925 yards and seven touchdowns on offense, and six interceptions for one touchdown on defense. As a senior, he recorded 68 receptions for 1,041 yards and 16 touchdowns, seven interceptions for three touchdowns, two punt return touchdowns, and one kick return touchdown, earning Class 5A all-state honors. Barbon also participated in track in high school.

== College career ==
Barbon played college football for the Temple Owls of Temple University. He was redshirted in 2018. He played in all 13 games during the 2019 season, catching 18 passes for 168 yards. He appeared in five games, starting two, during the COVID-19 shortened 2020 season, recording eight reception for 82 yards. Barbon missed two games that year due to COVID protocols. He played in all 12 games as a redshirt junior in 2021, catching 40 passes for 440 yards and two touchdowns while also rushing twice for 26 yards. His 40 catches were the most on the team that year. He was named to the American Athletic Conference (AAC) All-Academic Team. Barbon played in all 12 games in 2022, totaling 72 receptions for 918 yards and two touchdowns. He had six 100-yard receiving games that season, setting the school record. His 72 catches was the third most in Temple history while his 910 yards was the fourth most in school history. For his performance during the 2022 season, Barbon earned Pro Football Network honorable mention All-AAC and Phil Steele fourth-team All-AAC honors. He finished his college career with 138 catches, the fourth most in school history. He majored in communications studies at Temple.

== Professional career ==
Barbon declared for the NFL draft with one year of eligibility left. At Temple's pro day in March 2023, he posted a 4.47 second 40-yard dash and a broad jump of 10'8".

=== Dallas Cowboys ===
After going undrafted in the 2023 NFL draft, Barbon signed with the Dallas Cowboys on May 12, 2023. He was waived on August 29, 2023.

=== Calgary Stampeders ===
Barbon was signed to the practice roster of the Calgary Stampeders of the Canadian Football League (CFL) on October 8, 2023. He was later released on October 26, 2023.

=== Montreal Alouettes ===
Barbon signed with the CFL's Montreal Alouettes on January 15, 2024. He was moved to the practice roster on June 2, promoted to the active roster on June 15, moved back to the practice roster on June 19, promoted to the active roster again on September 5, and moved to the practice roster for the third time on September 10. He dressed in two games, starting one, overall during the 2024 season, catching three passes for 17 yards on five targets while also posting one tackle.

Barbon re-signed with Montreal on December 2, 2024. He was released on June 1, 2025, before the start of the 2025 CFL season. He was later signed to Montreal's practice roster on July 28, 2025. Barbon was released on September 27, 2025.
