= CTU =

CTU may refer to:

== Schools ==
- Can Tho University, Vietnam
- Capitol Technology University, Maryland
- Catholic Theological Union, Illinois
- Cebu Technological University, Philippines
- Chienkuo Technology University, Taiwan
- Chunnam Techno University, South Korea
- Colorado Technical University
- Czech Technical University in Prague

== Organizations ==
- Caribbean Telecommunications Union
- Chicago Teachers Union, a labor union
- Conservative Trade Unionists, UK
- New Zealand Council of Trade Unions
- CHH Txuri Urdin, a Spanish ice hockey team
- Corporate Training Unlimited, a security contracting firm operating in Iraq

== Other ==
- Chandigarh Transport Undertaking, India
- Chengdu Shuangliu International Airport (IATA airport code), China
- Clinical trials unit
- Coding tree unit, the basic processing unit of the High Efficiency Video Coding (HEVC) video standard
- Combustion Turbine Unit, a type of gas turbine
- Counter Terrorist Unit, a fictional government agency from the television series 24
