= Killing of Jim Kitterman =

- Part of Iraq War
- Location: Iraq
- Deaths: 1

On May 22, 2009, James Owen Kitterman (c. 1949 – May 22, 2009), an American citizen, was killed in Iraq's Green Zone.

Kitterman was a former United States Navy chief petty officer. He had worked in Iraq since the US invasion in 2003, for Kellogg, Brown and Root and other firms. He was the president of his own construction firm Janus Construction, based in Houston.

CNN reported on June 7, 2009, that Kitterman had been bound, blindfolded and gagged, prior to being stabbed.

== Suspects ==
Five men were arrested on June 5, 2009, at the barracks and office of security firm Corporate Training Unlimited (CTU). One of the arrested men was Donald Feeney Jr., a former Delta Force soldier and the founder of CTU. Also arrested were Donald Feeney III, one of Feeney's sons, two members of CTU, Micah Milligan and Mark Bridges, and an insect exterminator named Jason Jones who was spending the night on his way to Camp Taji.

The Washington Post reported that the five suspects were arrested by Iraqi authorities following a tip from the FBI. The Associated Press reported that the five men were arrested during a raid on the Corporate Training Unlimited's offices and barracks because their weapons permits had expired. Iraqi officials suspected that two of the men were involved in the murder.

Later, CNN quoted officials at the US Embassy who stated the five men were not suspected of the murder and that all five had alibis. Sarah Smith, a spokesperson with CTU, acknowledged that Feeney and his colleagues knew Kitterman, and respected him:

"Just being in the Green Zone for six years, they became very close. Everyone is deeply upset about the loss of Jim Kitterman and our deepest sympathy goes to his family."

One of the proclamations of America's administrator of Iraq, Paul Bremer, was that American contractors would be immune from prosecution in Iraqi courts. This proclamation remained in effect until the Iraqi legislature countermanded it in 2008.

=== Release ===
Three of the contractors were later released on June 11 due to lack of evidence. Milligan and Jones, who were held longer by the FBI, were released in July.

Two Iraqis testified in the ICCC (Iraqi Central Criminal Court) said that Kitterman's murder was committed by another American who himself was killed not long afterward. Larry Eugene Young, a CTU employee, was killed by mortar fire in the Green Zone on the same day as Kitterman's murder.

== See also ==
- Kirk von Ackermann
- Ryan G. Manelick
