= Dahood Qaisi =

American professional soccer player (b. 1991)

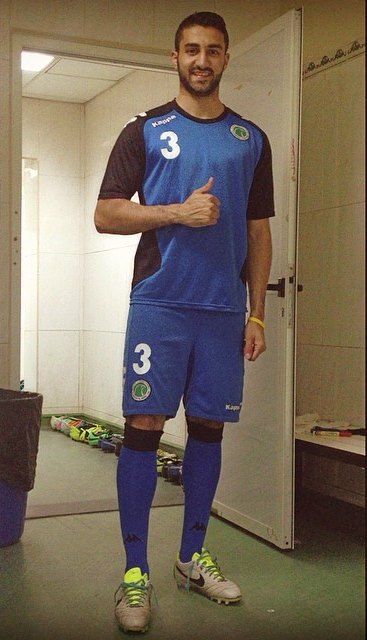
- Qaisi at Al Shabab

Personal information
- Full name: Dahood "David" Ibrahim Qaisi
- Date of birth: May 12, 1991 (age 35)
- Place of birth: Reading, Pennsylvania, United States
- Height: 1.86 m (6 ft 1 in)
- Position: Center-back

Team information
- Current team: Harrisburg Heat
- Number: 3

Youth career
- 2006 – 2009: PA Classics
- 2012 – 2013: Harrisburg City Islanders Academy

College career
Years	Team	Apps	(Gls)
2009 – 2013	Lock Haven University	65	(5)

Senior career*
Years	Team	Apps	(Gls)
2013	Shabab Al-Khalil SC	16	(3)
2013 – 2014	Harrisburg Heat	6	(2)
2014 – 2015	Al Shabab	0	(0)
2015 – 2016	Harrisburg Heat	4	(0)
- * Club domestic league appearances and goals

Dahood "David" Qaisi (born May 12, 1991) is an American professional soccer player who formerly played for professional indoor soccer team Harrisburg Heat of the Major Arena Soccer League.

== College ==
Qaisi graduated from Conestoga Valley High School before enrolling at Lock Haven University in 2009. He was a key contributor in defense all 4 years and captained the squad his senior season. He tallied 65 total appearances for the Bald Eagles netting 5 goals. Qaisi's impressive play in 2011 earned him a spot on the PSAC Second Team and PSAC First Team in 2012.

== Professional ==
=== Shabab Al-Khalil ===
After graduation from Lock Haven University, Qaisi signed with West Bank professional soccer club, Shabab Al-Khalil SC of the Premier League on July 19, 2013. He made his professional debut on July 29, 2013, in Shabab Al-Khalil SC's first game of the preseason against Hilal Al-Quds. He enjoyed a brief stint there making 16 appearances and scoring 3 goals to help win the Palestine Super Cup tournament and the West Bank Super Cup.

=== Harrisburg Heat ===
Qaisi returned to the states to sign with the Harrisburg Heat. He made his Heat debut and scored 2 goals for the Heat in a preseason friendly against the New Jersey Dynamo.

=== Al-Shabab Al-Arabi Club ===
In January 2014, Qaisi signed a contract with Al Shabab Club for the 2014 - 2015 season in Dubai of the United Arab Emirates.

=== Harrisburg Heat ===
He returned to the states once again to sign with the Harrisburg Heat.
