= Conestoga Valley High School =

Location
- 2110 Horseshoe Road; Lancaster, Lancaster County, Pennsylvania 17601; United States; 40.050°N 76.222°W

Information
- School type: Public, secondary
- Established: 1958
- School district: Conestoga Valley School District
- NCES District ID: 4206480
- Superintendent: Daniel Hartman
- School code: 392105
- Principal: Matthew Fox
- Teaching staff: 81.88 (FTE)
- Grades: 9 – 12
- Enrollment: 1,296 (2023–2024)
- Student to teacher ratio: 15.83
- Schedule type: Block scheduling
- Hours in school day: 7 hours
- Campus type: Rural
- Colors: Red and navy
- Mascot: Buckskin
- Newspaper: The Valley Voice
- Yearbook: Conewago
- Feeder schools: Conestoga Valley Middle School
- Website: Conestoga Valley High School
- Conestoga Valley High School former athletic logo

Conestoga Valley High School is a public secondary school in the Conestoga Valley School District in Lancaster, Pennsylvania, United States. Its enrollment has been stable over the last decade: 1,333 during the 2024–2025 academic year and 1,334 during the 2010–11 academic year. Its current principal, Matthew Fox, began serving in 2024 and was previously an assistant principal.

== History ==
Conestoga Valley High School originated in 1907 when East Lampeter Township dedicated a two-room building next to present-day Smoketown Elementary School as its first high school, named East Lampeter High School. The building itself was constructed in 1868. The first class, the class of 1909, graduated with two years of high school education, but in the same year, the school was developed into a three-year school.

In 1910, the building was renovated to a four-room, two-story building, but the high school only remained there until 1927. In 1927, East Lampeter High School was moved west along Old Philadelphia Pike and remained there until 1958 when East Lampeter Township, Upper Leacock Township, and West Earl Township decided to merge their school systems into present-day Conestoga Valley School District. The high school was moved to present-day Smoketown Elementary School and was dedicated as the new high school, becoming a four-year high school in the process. Its old location became Witmer Heights Elementary School and then subsequently became a Mennonite church. The new location of the high school was built in 1937 when the one-room schoolhouses of East Lampeter Township were merged there.

In 1958, Conestoga Valley High School was moved to Horseshoe Road where the present-day high school now stands.

On March 21, 1989, George H.W. Bush spoke to 3,500 students, parents, and other supporters at Conestoga Valley High School about anti-drug abuse education programs.

=== Recent developments ===
In 2002, Conestoga Valley School District and the East Lampeter Township Police Department agreed to implement the School Resource Officer Program by placing a police officer in the high school. Officer Preston Gentzler became the school's first SRO and worked for three years until Officer Randy Shrom took over in 2005. From there, he served until 2010 when Officer Matthew Hess took over. Officer John Werner is the school's current SRO.

The high school building was renovated in 2006 and 2012. In 2006, specialized classrooms were created for art, business, and computer technology as well as the addition of two technology-enhanced Large Group Instruction rooms. In 2012, renovations were made to the school's roof at a cost of $370,000, and to the main entrance to make it more energy-efficient, at a cost of $17,000. The school expanded its wireless network to cover all of the building.

In 2012, a new electronic sign was installed to replace the old standard sign which had been in use since the building was erected. The sign cost $15,000 and was funded by a number of disbanding clubs which agreed to donate money as well as donations by the classes of 2003, 2005, 2006, 2007 and 2011. The school also launched a campaign in 2012 to renovate its stadium complex. Termed "Sound Mind, Sound Body, Sound Future", this capital campaign focuses on promoting physical activity through sports, a $3.4 million upgrade of its sports complex, and establishing durable athletic facilities that will last well into the future. The field will be replaced with artificial turf, the grandstand and concession stands will be expanded, the bleachers will be replaced with new ones that conform to the current safety codes, and the press box will be replaced. As of November 2012, more than $75,000 had been raised for the capital campaign, including a contribution of $10,000 donation by the Kysilka Family in memory of Karin Kincaid, class of 1991. The stadium campaign was completed and dedicated before the Homecoming football game in 2014.

For the 2012–2013 school year, the PSSAs were eliminated in favor of the Keystone Exams, a new set of exams that replaced the PSSAs. Instead of being tested in math, reading, science, and writing, students are tested in Algebra I, Biology, and Literature.

The one to one computing initiative began in the 2013–2014 school year. Each student received a Lenovo netbook to use throughout the school year. This initiative has evolved over time, with children now receiving iPads, and has been expanded to Conestoga Valley Middle School. Students received the laptops free of cost, paying only a $40 per year insurance fee to cover accidental damage or loss of technological equipment. The school hopes that this move towards technology will lower the overall cost throughout the school by eliminating printed textbooks and worksheets. This change has accompanied e-book readers for use in the library.

== Athletics ==
- Baseball
- Basketball
- Bowling
- Cheerleading
- Cross country
- Field hockey
- Football
- Golf
- Lacrosse
- Rifle
- Soccer
- Swimming
- Tennis
- Track
- Volleyball
- Wrestling

== Notable alumni ==
- Kim Glass - indoor volleyball player; joined the U.S. national team in the Olympics; won a silver medal in the 2008 Beijing Olympics
- Keith Greiner - politician, member of the Pennsylvania House of Representatives since 2013
- Jonathan Groff - actor and singer; was in the original casts of the Broadway musicals Spring Awakening and Hamilton; voiced Kristoff in the Disney movie Frozen; starred in the television series Glee, the Netflix series Mindhunter and Looking
- Floyd Landis - professional cyclist; won several events including the Tour of California in 2006, and the Tour de France in 2006; convicted of doping
- Ryan G. Manelick - defense contractor in Baghdad, Iraq
- Dahood Qaisi - retired professional soccer player; played for the Harrisburg Heat, Shabab al-Khalil, and Al Shabab
- Kevin Shaffer - football offensive tackle; played for the Atlanta Falcons, Cleveland Browns, and Chicago Bears
- Laurie Show - murder victim
- Travis Switzer - offensive coordinator for the Cleveland Browns

== Former principals ==
Before Conestoga Valley High School was so named, a multitude of principals preceded Michael Thornton. At the time that East Lampeter High School was located along Old Philadelphia Pike, from 1928 to 1958, the principals were Charles Ressel, Aaron Breidenstine, Galen Kilhefner, Harry K. Gerlach, Henry Walker, and J. Elias Fritz. When East Lampeter High School was moved to Horseshoe Road in 1958 and renamed Conestoga Valley High School, Fritz left the principal position to become the first supervising principal of the district, therefore becoming the first superintendent of Conestoga Valley School District. An elementary school in the district is named after him.

A recent former principal was Brian Ginter, who served as the high school's assistant principal before moving on to become principal in 2003. He remained in that position for five years before accepting a principal position at Warwick High School.

Michael Thornton previously served as the principal of Tunkhannock Area High School in Tunkhannock, Pennsylvania, and Blue Ridge High School in New Milford, Pennsylvania, before coming to Conestoga Valley High School in 2008. He served as principal from 2008 until 2020.

Matthew Fox became principal in 2024. He was previously an assistant principal.
