= 2012–13 Harrisburg Heat season =

Harrisburg Heat
2012–13 PASL season
- General Manager: David Grimaldi
- Head Coach: Richard Chinapoo
- Arena: Farm Show Arena; Harrisburg, Pennsylvania
- PASL: 3rd, Eastern
- US Open Cup: Quarter-finals
- Highest home attendance: 2,517 (January 26, 2013) vs Illinois Piasa
- Lowest home attendance: 1,250 (January 25, 2013) vs San Diego Sockers
- Average home league attendance: 1,781 (8 regular season games)

The 2012–13 Harrisburg Heat season was the first season of the new Harrisburg Heat indoor soccer club. The Heat, an Eastern Division team in the Professional Arena Soccer League, played their home games in the Farm Show Arena at the Pennsylvania Farm Show Complex & Expo Center in Harrisburg, Pennsylvania. The team, owned by Harrisburg Heat Sports Group, LLC, was led by general manager David Grimaldi, head coach Richard Chinapoo, and assistant coach Gino DiFlorio.

== Season summary ==
The team struggled in the regular season, finishing 6–10, and failed to advance to the postseason. Four of Harrisburg's six wins came against the Ohio Vortex who they swept for the season. Their other wins came against the struggling Illinois Piasa and in an upset of the Eastern Division-leading Detroit Waza. The team fared better at the box office with the third-highest average attendance at home games, behind only the Dallas Sidekicks and San Diego Sockers.

The Heat participated in the 2012–13 United States Open Cup for Arena Soccer. They received a bye in the Wild Card round then defeated Real Harrisburg in the Round of 16 before losing to the Detroit Waza on the road in the Quarter-Finals.

== History ==
The new Heat claim the heritage of the original Harrisburg Heat professional indoor soccer team which played 12 seasons in the National Professional Soccer League, which later became the Major Indoor Soccer League, from 1991 through 2003. When the Heat played host to the Cincinnati Kings on November 17, 2012, it was the first professional indoor soccer game held at the Farm Show Arena since the original Heat franchise folded in 2003. The arena was upgraded with a new scoreboard in November 2012, just before the team's home debut.

== Off-field moves ==
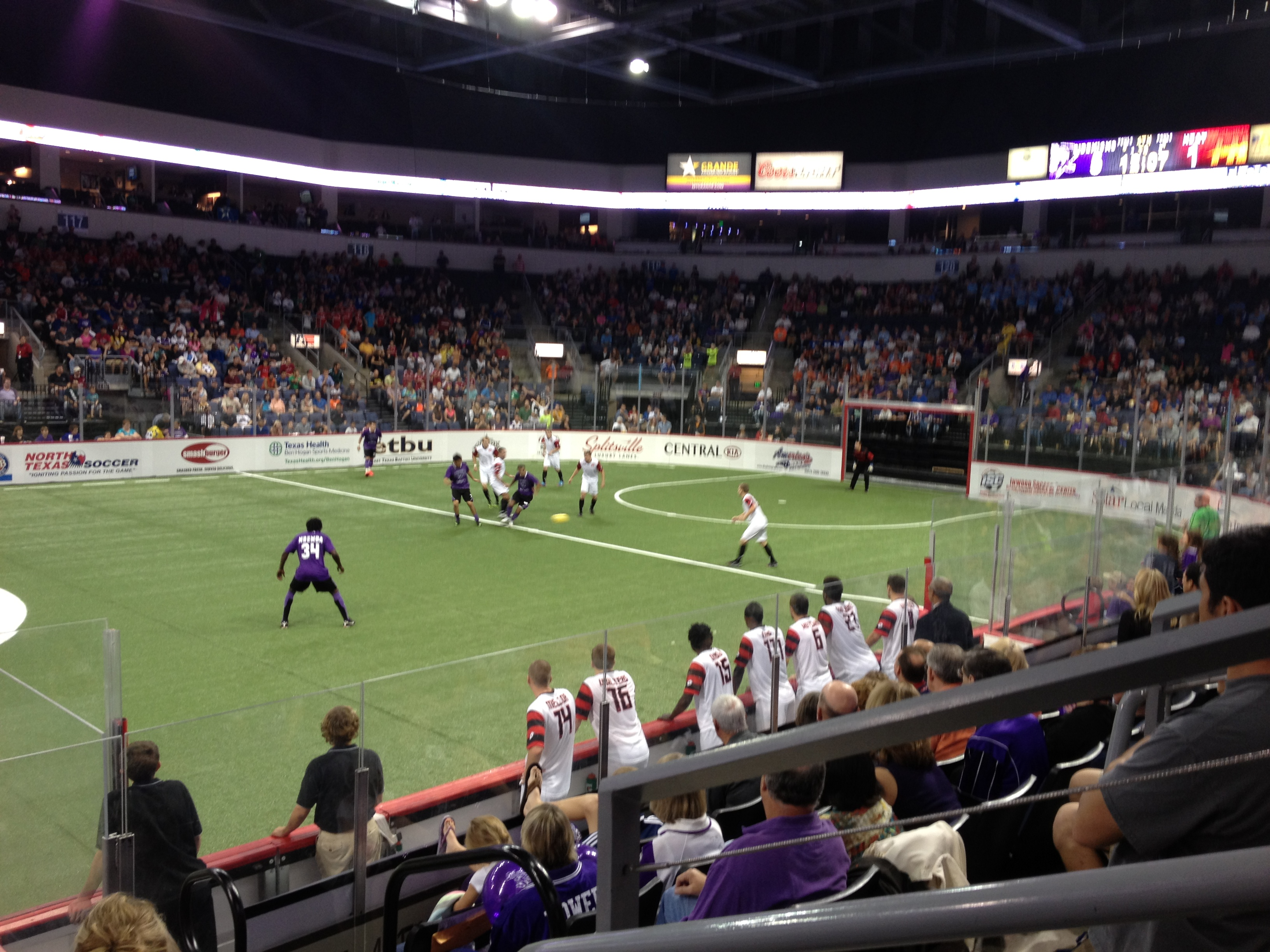
The Heat at the Dallas Sidekicks home opener, November 3, 2012.

General manager David Grimaldi is a former commissioner of the National Indoor Soccer League and former deputy commissioner of the current Major Indoor Soccer League. Heat head coach Richard Chinapoo and assistant coach Gino DiFlorio both played for the original Harrisburg Heat. Chinapoo also served as that team's head coach from 1998 through 2002. DiFlorio's playing career included the Cleveland Force, Dallas Sidekicks, Dayton Dynamo, Canton Invaders, Cleveland Crunch, Toronto Rockets, Buffalo Blizzard, Cincinnati Silverbacks, Baltimore Blast, and the original Harrisburg Heat.

Broadcasts of Heat games for the 2012–13 season are carried on radio station WMSS (91.1 FM, "Super 91") as well as webcast on wmssfm.com and pennlive.com. Original Heat radio voice John Wilsbach handles play-by-play for the broadcasts.

Chuck Mummert, the "Singing Mayor" of nearby Elizabethtown, Pennsylvania, performed "The Star-Spangled Banner" before a December 2012 home game for the Heat.

The team wore pink soccer jerseys for their January 25, 2013, game against the San Diego Sockers. After the game, the sweaters were auctioned to raise money for a breast cancer awareness charity. On January 26, 2013, the team wore camouflage jerseys which were then auctioned to benefit Operation Comfort Warriors, an initiative by the American Legion. Operation Comfort Warriors provides wounded military personnel with comfort items such as DVDs, puzzles, books, ping pong tables, entertainment centers, and computers.

== Roster moves ==
The Heat's opening night roster included 10 players with experience playing for Harrisburg's professional outdoor soccer team, the Harrisburg City Islanders, a team in the National Division of the USL Pro soccer league. Along with his professional experience playing for the Islanders, goalkeeper Sam Bishop had been a standout college soccer player as a member of the Lehigh Mountain Hawks men's team, having recorded the best goals against average in the team's history.

Of all the players on the opening night roster, only goalkeeper Dave Kern and defender Jason Hotchkin had experience playing professional indoor soccer.

Rookie forward Tyler Witmer missed the team's open tryout but persuaded head coach Richard Chinapoo to allow him to work out with the team and earned an invitation to training camp. He went on to become one of the team's leading scorers.

In late January 2013, player Kent Ramirez left the team for a career in law enforcement.

On February 10, 2013, top player Chris Williams left the Heat to sign with the Baltimore Blast of the Major Indoor Soccer League.

Head coach Richard Chinapoo, age 56, donned a number 22 jersey and put himself in as a defender for the final three minutes of the team's season finale against the Ohio Vortex on February 16, 2013.

== Awards and honors ==
The Heat honored head coach Richard Chinapoo during a halftime ceremony during the team's inaugural home game on November 17, 2012. Chinapoo retired as a player in 2000 and was inducted into the Harrisburg Heat Hall of Fame in 2001. The team honored original Harrisburg Heat player and former team captain Bill Becher during a halftime ceremony during the November 24, 2012, game.

The team retired the #9 jersey of Danny Kelly, a top player and first-ever draft pick for the original Harrisburg Heat franchise in the 1990s, in a halftime ceremony during the December 8, 2012, game. After retiring as a player, Kelly became the head coach of the Baltimore Blast in May 2006.

The Heat retired the #30 jersey of Gino DiFlorio, now the team's assistant coach, in a halftime ceremony during the December 15, 2012, game. DiFlorio is one of professional indoor soccer's all-time leading scorers and was a member of the original Harrisburg Heat from 1998 to 2002.

The team retired the #40 jersey of David Bascome, the all-time leading scorer for the original Harrisburg Heat franchise, in a halftime ceremony during the December 29, 2012, game. Bascome played with the original Harrisburg Heat in 1991 and from 1993 through 2000.

On January 19, 2013, the team had original Harrisburg Heat owner Rex Herbert kick out the ceremonial first ball. Also, the team recognized Jim Pollihan, the coach of the original Heat from their launch in 1991 through 1999, in a halftime ceremony.

The team retired the #5 jersey of Bob Lilley, a standout player for six seasons with the original Heat franchise in the mid-1990s, in a halftime ceremony during the January 25, 2013, game against the San Diego Sockers.

== Schedule ==
Win Tie Loss

=== Regular season ===
Game	Day	Date	Kickoff	Opponent	Results		Location	Attendance
Game	Day	Date	Kickoff	Opponent	Final Score	Record	Location	Attendance
1	Saturday	November 3	7:00pm (8:00pm Eastern)	at Dallas Sidekicks	L 2–6	0–1	Allen Event Center	5,909
2	Saturday	November 17	7:05pm	Cincinnati Kings	L 4–7	0–2	Farm Show Arena	1,819
3	Saturday	November 24	7:05pm	Ohio Vortex	W 13–1	1–2	Farm Show Arena	1,864
4	Saturday	December 8	7:05pm	Cincinnati Kings	L 8–9 (OT)	1–3	Farm Show Arena	1,627
5	Saturday	December 15	7:05pm	Detroit Waza	L 3–6	1–4	Farm Show Arena	1,735
6	Friday	December 21	7:35pm	at Cincinnati Kings	L 4–7	1–5	GameTime Training Center	216
7	Saturday	December 22	7:35pm	at Ohio Vortex	W 9–2	2–5	Pinnacle Sports Complex	112
8	Saturday	December 29	7:05pm	Ohio Vortex	W 9–2	3–5	Farm Show Arena	1,705
9	Saturday	January 12	7:35pm	at Detroit Waza†	L 4–8	3–6	Taylor Sportsplex	417
10	Sunday	January 13	2:05pm	at Detroit Waza	L 8–15	3–7	Taylor Sportsplex	351
11	Saturday	January 19	7:05pm	Detroit Waza	W 10–6	4–7	Farm Show Arena	1,735
12	Friday	January 25	7:05pm	San Diego Sockers	L 3–10	4–8	Farm Show Arena	1,250
13	Saturday	January 26	7:05pm	Illinois Piasa	W 10–5	5–8	Farm Show Arena	2,517
14	Friday	February 1	7:00pm (8:00pm Eastern)	at Chicago Mustangs	L 8–10	5–9	Grand Sports Arena	299
15	Saturday	February 2	7:05pm (8:05pm Eastern)	at Rockford Rampage	L 3–5	5–10	Victory Sports Complex	200
16	Saturday	February 16	7:35pm	at Ohio Vortex	W 8–3	6–10	Pinnacle Sports Complex	259

† Game also counts for US Open Cup, as listed in chart below.

=== 2012–13 US Open Cup for Arena Soccer ===
Game	Date	Kickoff	Opponent	Results		Location	Attendance
Game	Date	Kickoff	Opponent	Final Score	Record	Location	Attendance
Wild Card	BYE						
Round of 16	January 4	7:30pm	Real Harrisburg	W 11–8	1–0	Sports City Harrisburg	?
Quarter-finals	January 12	7:35pm	at Detroit Waza	L 4–8	1–1	Taylor Sportsplex	417
