= 2013–14 Harrisburg Heat season =

Harrisburg Heat
2013–14 PASL season
- General Manager: John Wilsbach
- Head Coach: Richard Chinapoo
- Arena: Farm Show Equine Arena; Harrisburg, Pennsylvania
- Professional Arena Soccer League: Eastern
- US Open Cup: Quarterfinals
- Highest home attendance: 2,373 (January 25 vs. Chicago Mustangs)
- Lowest home attendance: 1,050 (November 23 vs. Cleveland Freeze)
- Average home league attendance: 1,720 (8 games)

The 2013–14 Harrisburg Heat season was the second season of the new Harrisburg Heat indoor soccer club. The Heat, an Eastern Division team in the Professional Arena Soccer League, played their home games in the 2,200 seat Equine Arena at the Pennsylvania Farm Show Complex & Expo Center in Harrisburg, Pennsylvania.

After the 2012-13 season, the PASL sold the team to longtime broadcaster John Wilsbach, operating as Heat Soccer Group LLC. The head coach remained Richard Chinapoo, and assistant coach Gino DiFlorio.

== Season summary ==
The Heat started the season with an overtime victory over the Detroit Waza then lost 7 of their next 9 matches, including all 4 of their scheduled games against the expansion Cleveland Freeze. The season wound to an end with consecutive losses as the team posted a 4–12 record and failed to qualify for the playoffs. Head coach Richard Chinapoo had previously announced his intention to retire after this season.

The Heat participated in the 2013–14 United States Open Cup for Arena Soccer starting with a weather-delayed Round of 32 victory over independent team ReAL Harrisburg. Harrisburg defeated Detroit Waza in a Round of 16 match on December 21, 2013, then lost to the Cleveland Freeze in the Quarter-finals on December 28.

== History ==
The new Heat claim the heritage of the original Harrisburg Heat professional indoor soccer team which played 12 seasons in the National Professional Soccer League, which later became the Major Indoor Soccer League, from 1991 through 2003. The Heat completed their inaugural 2012-13 season with a 6–10 record, finishing 3rd in the PASL's Eastern Division.

== Off-field moves ==
The Harrisburg Heat announced in early July 2013 that head coach Richard Chinapoo and assistant Gino DiFlorio would return to lead the team for the 2013–14 season. On July 24, Chinapoo announced that this season would be his last in Harrisburg as he plans to move to Florida in August 2014 to be with his wife and daughter.

On August 18, 2013, defender Jason Hotchkin was shot during an altercation at the Spirit Kick-Off Classic XXVII youth soccer tournament in West Chester, Pennsylvania. (A colleague, former Harrisburg City Islanders midfielder Moffat Oduor, was also injured.) Hotchkin was admitted to Paoli Memorial Hospital in critical condition while Oduor was treated and released. A suspect, Curtis Zebley, was arrested and charged with multiple offenses including attempted criminal homicide and illegal possession of a firearm. Several groups organized fundraisers to defray Hotchkin's medical expenses as he lacks medical insurance. While his condition was upgraded to "good" a few days later, he ultimately did not return during the 2013–14 season. David Schofield serves as team captain during his absence. Hotchkin appeared at the January 25 match against the Chicago Mustangs to make the ceremonial first kick.

The team's chiropractor is Josee Homza.

On January 24, the Heat announced that they would relocate from the 2,200-seat Equine Arena at the Pennsylvania Farm Show Complex & Expo Center to the complex's 7,300-seat Large Arena. The original Harrisburg Heat played its home matches at the Large Arena during their 12 seasons of existence.

== Roster moves ==
The Heat scheduled two open tryouts at Sports City Harrisburg, the first on September 15 and the second on October 6. Training camp for the team opened on October 21. When the team's 20-man roster was completed, 12 of the selected players had experience with the Heat during the previous season.

On November 14, the team signed 43-year-old Lester Felician, a veteran of several indoor soccer franchises including the original Harrisburg Heat. On November 20, the team announced that forward Mitch Walters was out for the remainder of the season following an anterior cruciate ligament injury. Midfielder Kenny Fultz was moved to forward in his place.

In mid-December 2013, the Heat signed rookie Danny DiPrima.

== Awards and honors ==
On December 9, 2013, the Young Alumni Club at Seton Hall University announced that Harrisburg Heat defender Brad Kerstetter (class of 2012) would be a recipient of the Young Alumni Impact Award, given for "service to Seton Hall, one's community or profession". The organization cited Kerstetter's impact in the athletic community, both as a professional and as a volunteer, for his efforts with the Heat and as a high school coach.

On December 24, 2013, the Professional Arena Soccer League named forward Tom Mellor as the PASL Player of the Week. The league cited his team-leading scoring efforts, including five goals and one assist against Detroit Waza.

== Schedule ==
Win Loss

=== Exhibition ===
Game	Day	Date	Kickoff	Opponent	Results		Location	Attendance
Game	Day	Date	Kickoff	Opponent	Final score	Record	Location	Attendance
1	Saturday	November 2	7:05pm	New Jersey Dynamo	W 17–0	1–0	Farm Show Arena	
2	Friday	December 27	7:05pm	New Jersey Dynamo	W 11–0	2–0	Farm Show Arena	

=== Regular season ===
Game	Day	Date	Kickoff	Opponent	Results		Location	Attendance
Game	Day	Date	Kickoff	Opponent	Score	Record	Location	Attendance
1	Saturday	November 9	7:05pm	at Detroit Waza	W 8–7 (OT)	1–0	Melvindale Civic Center	545
2	Sunday	November 10	3:05pm	at Cleveland Freeze	L 3–11	1–1	Soccer Sportsplex	703
3	Saturday	November 16	7:35pm	Detroit Waza	L 5–8	1–2	Farm Show Arena	1,605
4	Saturday	November 23	7:05pm	Cleveland Freeze	L 7–10	1–3	Farm Show Arena	1,050
5	Saturday	November 30	7:05pm	Cincinnati Saints	W 8–6	2–3	Farm Show Arena	1,458
6	Saturday	December 21	7:05pm	Detroit Waza†	W 9–8	3–3	Farm Show Arena	1,590
7	Sunday	December 22	4:05pm	at Cleveland Freeze	L 4–12	3–4	Soccer Sportsplex	431
8	Saturday	December 28	7:05pm	Cleveland Freeze†	L 5–12	3–5	Farm Show Arena	1,581
9	Saturday	January 11	7:35pm	at Cincinnati Saints	L 8–9	3–6	Tri-County Soccerplex	421
10	Sunday	January 12	3:05pm	at Detroit Waza	L 6–12	3–7	Melvindale Civic Center	356
11	Saturday	January 18	7:05pm	Cincinnati Saints	W 10–5	4–7	Farm Show Arena	2,209
12	Friday	January 24	7:05pm	Chicago Mustangs	L 7–13	4–8	Farm Show Arena	1,895
13	Saturday	January 25	7:05pm	Chicago Mustangs	L 5–12	4–9	Farm Show Arena	2,373
14	Saturday	February 8	8:35pm	at Illinois Piasa	L 3–4	4–10	The Field Sports Complex	206
15	Sunday	February 9	5:05pm	at Chicago Mustangs	L 3–14	4–11	Grand Sports Arena	748
16	Sunday	February 16	4:05pm	at Dallas Sidekicks	L 3–13	4–12	Allen Event Center	4,207

† Game also counts for US Open Cup, as listed in chart below.

=== U.S. Open Cup for Arena Soccer ===
Round	Day	Date	Kickoff	Opponent	Results		Location	Attendance
Round	Day	Date	Kickoff	Opponent	Score	Record	Location	Attendance
Round of 32	Thursday	December 19♥	7:30pm	ReAL Harrisburg	W 9–3	1–0	Sports City Harrisburg	
Round of 16	Saturday	December 21	7:05pm	Detroit Waza	W 9–8	2–0	Farm Show Arena	1,590
Quarter finals	Saturday	December 28	7:05pm	Cleveland Freeze	L 5–12	2–1	Farm Show Arena	1,581

♥ Postponed from December 14 due to severe winter weather.
