= Travis Switzer =

American football coach (born 1992)

Cleveland Browns
- Title: Offensive coordinator

Personal information
- Born: November 11, 1992 (age 33); Lancaster, Pennsylvania, U.S.
- Listed height: 6 ft 2 in (1.88 m)
- Listed weight: 301 lb (137 kg)

Career information
- Position: Center
- High school: Conestoga Valley (Lancaster)
- College: Akron (2011–2014)
- NFL draft: 2015: undrafted

Career history
- Baltimore Ravens (2017–2025); Administrative assistant/performance (2017); Performance staff assistant (2018); Coaching analyst/offense (2019–2020); Offensive quality control coach (2021–2023); Run game coordinator (2024–2025); Cleveland Browns (2026–present) Offensive coordinator
- Coaching profile at Pro Football Reference

Travis Switzer (born November 11, 1992) is an American professional football coach who is currently the offensive coordinator for the Cleveland Browns of the National Football League (NFL). He played college football for the Akron Zips and previously worked for the Baltimore Ravens.

== Early life ==
Switzer was born on November 11, 1992, in Lancaster, Pennsylvania. He attended Conestoga Valley High School in Lancaster where he played football as a lineman and also competed in basketball and track and field. He was selected all-league and All-Section 11 in 2009 and 2010 and was named Conestoga's offensive, defensive, and outstanding lineman of the year in 2010 after posting 52 tackles and eight sacks.

After high school, Switzer played college football for the Akron Zips from 2011 to 2014. He started three games in 2011, then started all 12 games at center in each of his last three years. He twice won the team's offensive Harry "Doc" Smith Award, "which recognizes the most outstanding player of each class," and also received Academic All-Mid-American Conference (MAC) honors.

Pre-draft measurables
| Height | Weight | Arm length | Hand span | 40-yard dash | 10-yard split | 20-yard split | 20-yard shuttle | Three-cone drill | Vertical jump | Broad jump | Bench press |
|---|---|---|---|---|---|---|---|---|---|---|---|
| 6 ft 2 1/4 in (1.89 m) | 301 lb (137 kg) | 30 1/2 in (0.77 m) | 9 3/4 in (0.25 m) | 5.30 s | 1.80 s | 2.94 s | 4.76 s | 7.84 s | 29.5 in (0.75 m) | 8 ft 11 in (2.72 m) | 35 reps |
All values from Pro Day

After going unselected in the 2015 NFL draft, Switzer participated at the Miami Dolphins rookie minicamp, but was not signed.

== Coaching career ==
Switzer joined the Baltimore Ravens in 2017 as an administrative/performance assistant. In 2019, he became an offensive coaching analyst and worked with the team's wide receivers. Two years later, he received a promotion to offensive quality control coach and worked with the team's tight ends. In 2023, Switzer was named the Ravens' run game coordinator. In three years as run game coordinator, he helped the team have one of the best rushing attacks in the league, featuring Derrick Henry and Lamar Jackson. From 2023 to 2025, the Ravens averaged 166.9 rushing yards a game and posted 8,512 rushing yards to lead the league, while Henry was the NFL's leading rusher over that span.

On February 20, 2026, Switzer followed Todd Monken to the Cleveland Browns to serve as offensive coordinator.
