= Kevin Healey (soccer) =

American soccer coach

Personal information
- Place of birth: United States

Youth career
- Years: Team
- 1974–1977: Loyola Greyhounds

Managerial career
- 1993–1998: Baltimore Bays
- 1998–2002: Baltimore Blast

Kevin Healey is an American soccer executive, former player and coach, and retired banking executive. He is currently the president of the Harrisburg Heat and previously served as general manager and coach of the Baltimore Blast.

== Early life ==
Healey grew up in Dundalk, Maryland and graduated from Calvert Hall College High School. He attended Loyola University Maryland. After graduation, he entered the banking industry.

== Career ==
=== Playing ===
Healey played soccer for Loyola University Maryland on the school's 1976 NCAA Division II Men's Soccer Championship team.

=== Coaching ===
In 1986, Healey coached the Dundalk Post 38 U-19 team to the regional championship. In March 1991, he coached the Baltimore Hummers to a national open indoor championship. In January 1993, the newly established Baltimore Bays of the USISL hired Healey for its upcoming outdoor season. Over the next five years, Healey coached the Bays to three indoor championships (1996–1998) and was a three time Coach of the Year.

In 1998, the Baltimore Blast of the National Professional Soccer League hired Healey as both head coach and general manager. Healey coached the Blast until 2002, compiling an 85–83 record. Healey also serves as coach of the Baltimore Bays youth club.

=== Executive ===
In 1990, he founded the Soccer Club of Baltimore. Healey serves as president and coach of the Baltimore Bays youth club. The Bays were founded in 2002 as a merger of the Soccer Club of Baltimore and the Baltimore Football Club. Healey continued to serve as general manager of the Baltimore Blast until 2018 when he joined the Harrisburg Heat as president.

In the banking industry, he served as vice president and assistant comptroller of Provident Bank of Maryland.

== Personal life ==
Healey is the son of Francis Patrick Healey, a former professional player, coach, and administrator who is a member of the Maryland Soccer Hall of Fame.

Healey's son Pat Healey also played and coached professional soccer, having played for the Baltimore Blast and coached for the Harrisburg Heat under his father’s leadership at both teams.
