= Kevin Shaffer =

American football player (born 1980)

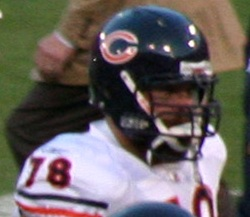
- Shaffer with the Chicago Bears

No. 76, 77, 78
- Position: Offensive tackle

Personal information
- Born: March 2, 1980 (age 46); Salisbury, Maryland, U.S.
- Listed height: 6 ft 7 in (2.01 m)
- Listed weight: 318 lb (144 kg)

Career information
- High school: Conestoga Valley (Lancaster, Pennsylvania)
- College: Tulsa
- NFL draft: 2002: 7th round, 244th overall pick

Career history
- Atlanta Falcons (2002–2005); Cleveland Browns (2006–2008); Chicago Bears (2009–2010)

Career NFL statistics
- Games played: 132
- Games started: 93
- Fumble recoveries: 1
- Stats at Pro Football Reference

Kevin Carl Shaffer (born March 2, 1980) is an American former professional football player who was an offensive tackle in the National Football League (NFL). He played college football for the Tulsa Golden Hurricane and was selected by the Atlanta Falcons in the seventh round of the 2002 NFL draft.

Shaffer also played for the Cleveland Browns and Chicago Bears.

== Early life ==
He attended Conestoga Valley High School and as a senior he made 33 tackles at the defensive tackle position.

== College career ==
Shaffer played college football at the University of Tulsa where he majored in finance.

== Professional career ==
=== Atlanta Falcons ===
Shaffer was selected by the Atlanta Falcons in the seventh round (244th overall) in the 2002 NFL draft. In his rookie season he played in six regular season games, plus two postseason games. He made his NFL debut at the Green Bay Packers on September 8. In the 2003 season he played in all 16 games and made his first NFL start at the New York Giants on November 9. In his third season for the Falcons, Shaffer started in 15 games and was a member of the offensive line that ranked first in the NFL with 2,672 rushing yards. Just as he did the previous season, he helped the offensive line become the highest ranked in terms of rushing yards with 159.1 yards per game. He started in all 16 regular season games.

=== Cleveland Browns ===
Shaffer signed with the Cleveland Browns as un unrestricted free agent on March 11, 2006. He started in all 16 regular season games and made his Browns debut versus the New Orleans Saints on September 10. In 2007, just as he had done the previous two seasons, Shaffer started in all 16 regular season games.

Shaffer was released by the Browns on March 12, 2009.

=== Chicago Bears ===
Shaffer agreed to terms on a three-year, $8 million contract with the Chicago Bears on March 25, 2009.

On February 28, 2011, the Bears released Shaffer.
