= Richard Chinapoo =

Trinidad and Tobago footballer (born 1957)

Personal information
- Date of birth: 18 January 1957 (age 69)
- Place of birth: San Juan, Trinidad and Tobago
- Height: 6 ft 1 in (1.85 m)
- Position: Defender

Youth career
- Trinity College

College career
Years	Team	Apps	(Gls)
1978–1981	Long Island Blackbirds		

Senior career*
Years	Team	Apps	(Gls)
1982–1983	New York Cosmos	33	(2)
- Malvern
- San Juan Jabloteh
1983–1988	Baltimore Blast (indoor)	124	(78)
1988–1990	Dallas Sidekicks (indoor)	89	(36)
1990–1991	Baltimore Blast (indoor)	52	(22)
1991–1992	Dallas Sidekicks (indoor)	36	(23)
1992–2000	Harrisburg Heat (indoor)	243	(101)

International career
1980–1989	Trinidad and Tobago		

Managerial career
- 1998–2002: Harrisburg Heat
- 2012–2014: Harrisburg Heat
- * Club domestic league appearances and goals

Richard Chinapoo (born 18 January 1957) is a Trinidad and Tobago former footballer who played as a defender, primarily in the United States. He spent two seasons in the North American Soccer League, eight in the National Professional Soccer League and at least eight in the Major Indoor Soccer League. He also played with the Trinidad and Tobago national team.

== College career ==
Chinapoo first attended college at Trinity College in Trinidad. In 1978, he entered Long Island University in the United States. In addition to his studies, he played on the men’s soccer team from 1978 to 1981, earning second team All-American recognition in 1978, 1979 and 1980. In 1981, he was selected as a first team All-American. He finished his four seasons with the Blackbirds with fifty-five career goals and was inducted into the Long Island, University Athletic Hall of Fame in 2001.

== Professional career ==
On 16 March 1982, Chinapoo signed a one-year contract with the New York Cosmos of the North American Soccer League. He ultimately spent two seasons with New York. Some sources show Chinapoo as playing for two Trinidad clubs, Malvern and San Juan Jabloteh, but the dates are unknown. At some point, he joined the Baltimore Blast of Major Indoor Soccer League (MISL). On 8 September 1988, Chinapoo signed as a free agent with the Dallas Sidekicks. He spent two seasons with the Sidekicks before returning to Baltimore on 6 August 1990. On 15 October 1991, Chinapoo signed as a free agent with the Sidekicks. This time, he played only a year. In 1992, MISL collapsed and several teams and most of the players jumped to the National Professional Soccer League (NPSL). Chinapoo left Dallas and signed with the Harrisburg Heat of NPSL. He would remain in Harrisburg for the remainder of his professional career, retiring from playing in 2000. He was inducted into the Heat Hall of Fame on 3 November 2001.

== International career ==
Chinapoo played numerous games with the Trinidad and Tobago national team, but the numbers and dates are unknown. His name first appears on current records during a 17 August 1980 World Cup qualification victory over Haiti. He played with the national team until at least 11 June 1989 when he played another World Cup qualification game, this time a 0–1 loss to Costa Rica.

== Coach career ==
In 1998, Chinapoo became a player-coach with the Harrisburg Heat. After he retired from playing in 2001, Chinapoo became a full-time head coach. In 2001, he was named the NPSL Coach of the Year. On August 11, 2002, after posting a 10-34 record during the 2001-2002 season, the Heat management released Chinapoo. He is currently the Technical Director of the Capital Area Soccer Association in Harrisburg, Pennsylvania.

In the summer of 2012, Richard was named the head coach of the new Professional Arena Soccer League team, the Harrisburg Heat. He retired from coaching and moved to Florida after the 2013–14 Harrisburg Heat season.
