= Harrisburg Heat (2012–present) =

American professional indoor soccer team based in Harrisburg, Pennsylvania

- Full name: Harrisburg Heat
- Founded: 2012; 14 years ago
- Stadium: Hersheypark Arena
- Capacity: 7,286
- Owner: Carl Delmont
- President: Kevin Healey
- Head Coach: Hugo Da Silva (interim)
- League: Major Arena Soccer League 2
- 2025–26: Eastern Division: 1st Playoffs: Champions
- Website: harrisburgheat.com
Home colors	Away colors

The Harrisburg Heat are an American professional indoor soccer team based in Hershey, Pennsylvania. The team temporarily competes in the Major Arena Soccer League 2 (MASL2), with plans to return to the Major Arena Soccer League (MASL) for the 2026–27 season.

The Heat formerly played its home games at the New Holland Arena (originally called the "Large Arena") and the Equine Arena at the Pennsylvania Farm Show Complex & Expo Center in Harrisburg, Pennsylvania. Beginning with the 2025–26 season, the team moved to nearby Hershey where it currently plays at the Hersheypark Arena.

The Harrisburg Heat claim the heritage of an original Harrisburg Heat franchise that was a member of the National Professional Soccer League (NPSL), which later became the Major Indoor Soccer League (MISL). Their mascot is a purple dragon named Scorch.

The Heat won its first and only championship title during the MASL2's 2025–26 season.

== History ==
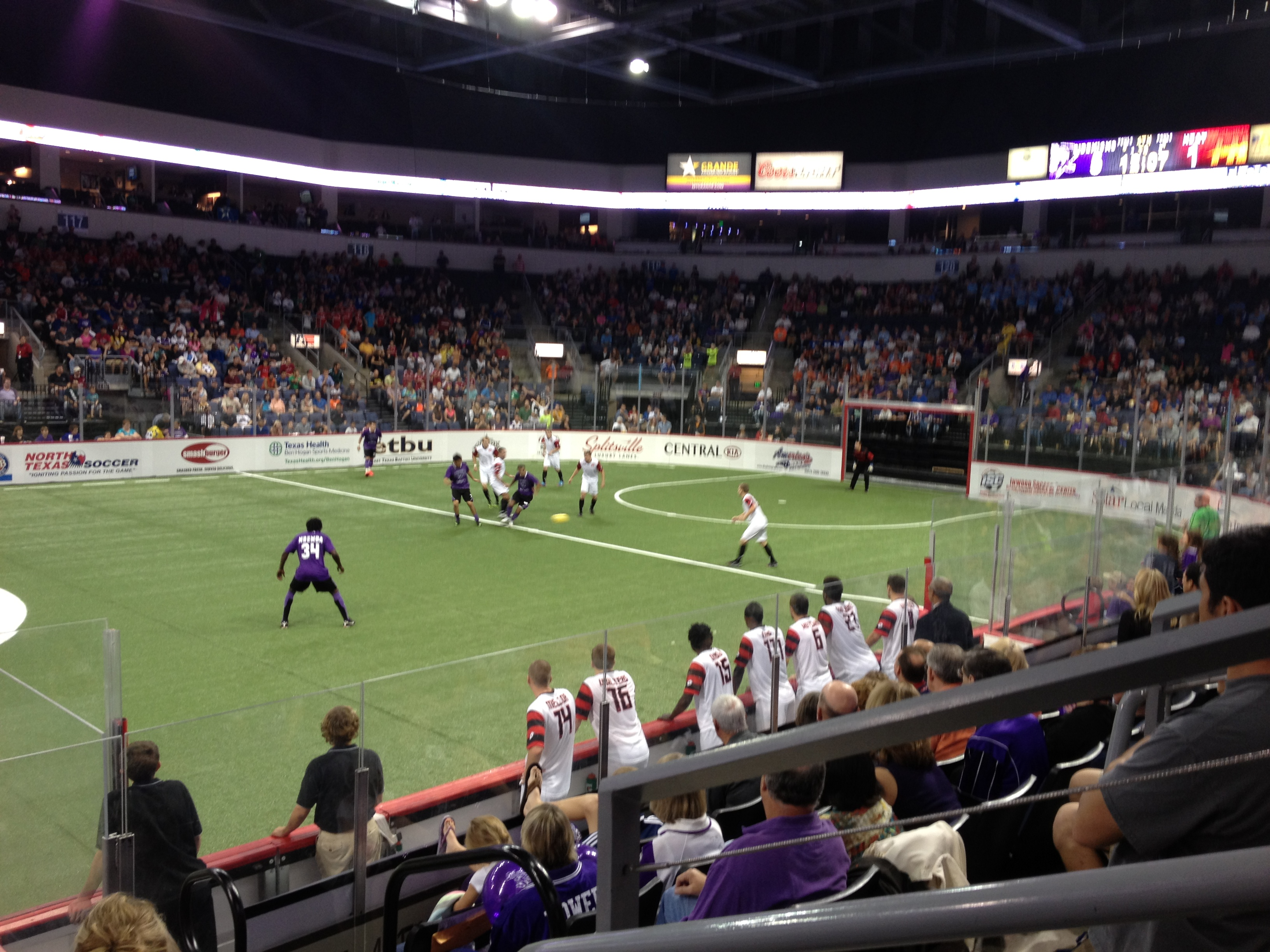
The Heat at the Dallas Sidekicks home opener, Nov. 3, 2012

On May 2, 2012, the Heat were awarded a Professional Arena Soccer League (PASL) expansion franchise to begin with the 2012–13 season.

Richard Chinapoo served as the team's head coach the first two seasons before retiring and being replaced by onetime indoor soccer star Tarik Walker, who was fired after an 0–13 start in the 2015–16 season. Gino DiFlorio longtime assistant coach, served as interim head co-coach with Mark Ludwig for the remainder of the season, with a 1–5 record.

The Heat was sold by the PASL in September 2013 and was owned and operated by the Heat Soccer Group, LLC with longtime indoor soccer broadcaster John Wilsbach as the principal owner. Wilsbach served as the president and general manager.

On January 24, 2014, the Heat announced they would relocate from the 1,660-seat Equine Arena at the Pennsylvania Farm Show Complex & Expo Center to the complex's 7,300-seat New Holland Arena starting with the 2014–15 season. The original Harrisburg Heat played their home matches at the Large Arena during their 12 seasons of existence. The team was scheduled to join the Indoor Professional League in 2016, but it was later announced that they had rejoined the MASL.

Carl Delmont purchased the team in June 2016 from John Wilsbach. Wilsbach remains with the team as the vice president of broadcasting.

Denison Cabral was named head coach of the Heat for the 2016–17 season and stepped down after the 2017–18 season. In August 2018, it was announced that they had signed former Baltimore Blast player Pat Healey as head coach and general manager, along with his father, former Blast general manager Kevin Healey, as president.

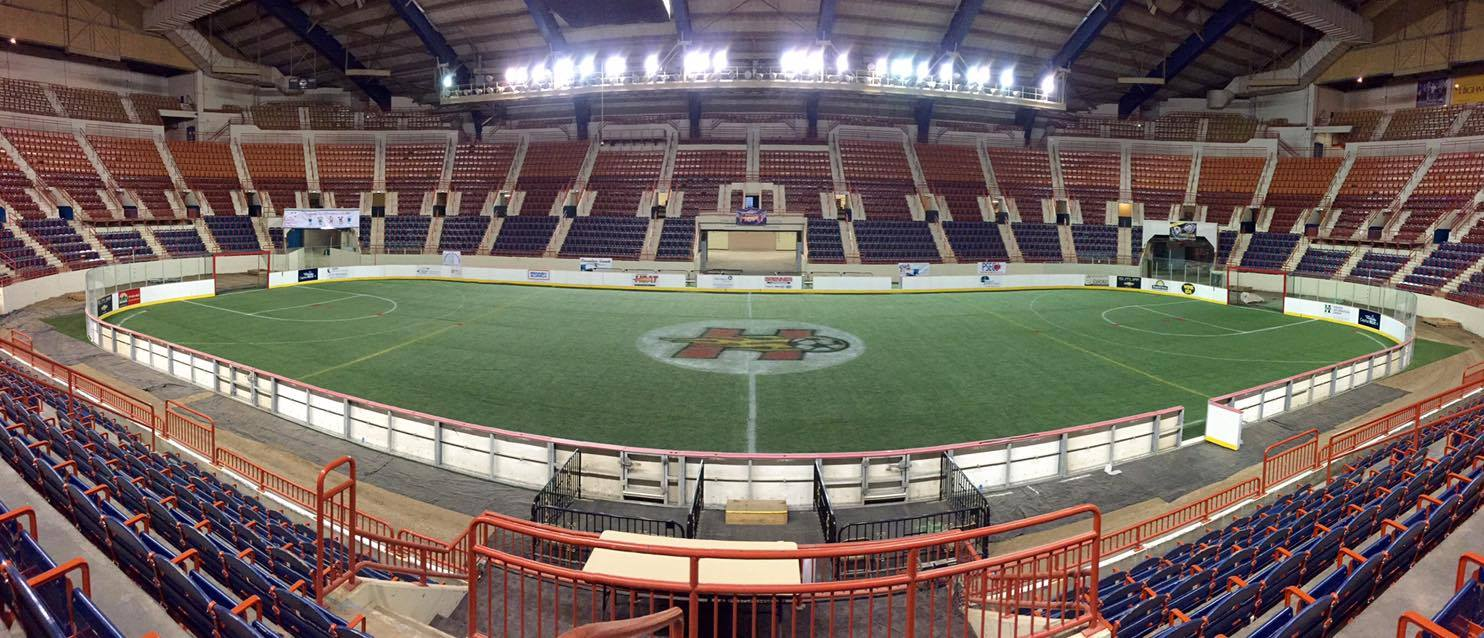
Panoramic view of the Heat field, the team's home venue

New management at the Pennsylvania Farm Show Complex & Expo Center failed to give the Heat required dates by the league-mandated deadline for the 2025–26 season, so the team moved to the Hersheypark Arena in nearby Hershey. Due to scheduling conflicts with their new home, the team was forced to play in the Major Arena Soccer League 2 (MASL2) for the 2025–26 season. It plans to return to the Major Arena Soccer League (MASL) for the 2026–27 season.

In October 2025, the Heat announced that Pat Healey was stepping down from his roles and that goalkeeper Hugo Da Silva would become interim head coach for the 2025–26 season.

The Heat went undefeated for the 2025–26 season, winning its first-ever championship title in the MASL2.

== Ownership ==
- Professional Arena Soccer League (2012–2013)
- John Wilsbach (2013–2016)
- Carl Delmont (2016–)

== Staff ==
- (United States) Kevin Healey – President
- (United States) Hugo Da Silva – Interim Head Coach
- (United States) Christopher Wooton – Chief Financial Officer (CFO)
- (United States) Kileigh Hess – Athletic Trainer

== Notable former players ==
- (United States) Stephen Basso
- (Brazil) Douglas dos Santos
- (United States) Darvin Ebanks
- (Brazil) Lucio Gonzaga
- (United States) Alex Mendoza
- (Morocco) Youssef Naciri
- (United States) Nick Noble
- (Cuba) Yaikel Pérez
- (Portugal) Val Teixeira
- (United States) Dahood Qaisi

== Year-by-year ==
League champions	Runners-up	Division champions	Playoff berth

Season	League	Won	Lost	OTL	GF	GA	Regular season	Playoffs	Avg. attendance	U.S. Open Cup
2012–13	PASL	6	10		106	102	3rd, Eastern Division	Did not qualify	1,781	Quarter-finals
2013–14	PASL	4	12		94	156	5th, Eastern Division	Did not qualify	1,720	Quarter-finals
2014–15	MASL	2	18		104	216	5th, Eastern Division	Did not qualify	2,989	N/A
2015–16	MASL	1	18		38	79	4th, Eastern Division	Did not qualify	2,029	N/A
2016–17	MASL	10	10		116	124	2nd, Eastern Division	Division Final	1,449	N/A
2017–18	MASL	6	16		114	148	4th, Eastern Division	Did not Qualify	1,459	N/A
2018–19	MASL	11	13		146	158	3rd, Eastern Division	Did not Qualify	2,194	N/A
2019–20	MASL	13	8		150	115	5th, Eastern Conference	Did not Qualify	2,468	N/A
2021–22	MASL	4	19	1	108	169	4th, Eastern Division	Did not Qualify	1,470	N/A
2022–23	MASL	6	17	1	89	161	7th, Eastern Division	Did not Qualify	1,471	N/A
2023–24	MASL	2	19	3	105	191	7th, Eastern Division	Did not Qualify	1,385	N/A
2024–25	MASL	3	20	1	127	180	12th	Did not qualify	1,429	N/A

== Playoffs ==
Season	Record	GF	GA	Avg. attendance
2016–17	1–2	10	15	1,152
