= Unity Resources Group =

Military and security consulting company

- Type: Private Company
- Industry: Security, Consulting
- Founded: 2000
- Headquarters: Los Angeles, California, United States
- Website: unityrg.com

Unity Resources Group is an American-owned private military and security consulting company headquartered in Los Angeles, USA.

== Background ==
Unity Resources Group (Unity) was established in Australia in 2000 and operates across the core markets of Australia, Africa, The Americas, the Middle East, Central Asia and Europe.

It describes itself as having a "diverse client base, spanning government, non-government and multi-national business sectors".

With the conclusion of the war in Iraq in 2003, Unity developed the business from a small consultancy through to independently winning and managing a number of large contracts with multi-national corporates and government agencies which continue to be serviced by Unity today.

The company is mainly staffed by Australian nationals. However, in 2010 most of the guard duties at the Australian embassy in Baghdad were being done by Chilean military veterans.

Unity is a member of the International Stability Operations Association, and was a member of the Private Security Company Association of Iraq before that organisation dissolved in 2011.

In May 2020 the company filed for incorporated status under the name Unity Resources Group, INC, which was granted.

== Services ==
Unity offers the following services:

- Security Services
- Advisory Services
- Crisis Services
- Aviation Services
- Facilities Management

Unity has partnered with Tokio Marine HCC to provide its Kidnap and Ransom policyholders with crisis response services on a worldwide basis.

== Subsidiary companies ==
Australia

- Unity Resources Group Pty Ltd

Asia

- Unity Resources Pakistan Pvt Ltd
- Unity Resources Group Pte Ltd

Middle East

- Unity Resources Group Pte Ltd – Iraq

Africa

- Unity Resources Group (Kenya) Ltd

Europe

- Unity Resources Group UK Ltd
- Unity Aviation Ltd

== Incidents ==
On 17 January 2007, American aid worker Andrea "Andi" Parhamovich and three of her URG guards were killed when their convoy was ambushed by insurgents in the Baghdad neighbourhood of Yarmouk. Parhamovich was returning from a meeting at Iraqi Islamic Party headquarters when the well-planned attack occurred. There had been three reported attacks in and around Yarmouk in the previous five days.

On 9 October 2007, employees of the company shot at an approaching car in Baghdad. Two civilian women, both in the front seat, were killed: Marou Awanis, 48, a mother of three, and Genevia Askander, 30. The shooting provoked strong outrage in Iraq, since it followed closely to the Blackwater Baghdad shootings of 16 September 2007 that led to the Iraqi government's attempt to ban Blackwater from Iraq. Both women were identified as Armenian Christians.

The company defended the actions of its employees who fired over nineteen rounds of ammunition before speeding away from the scene and has since been cleared of any wrongdoing. Unity is the security provider for USAID contractor RTI International. RTI was however not the client under protection when the shooting occurred. The passengers in the back seat, including one child, survived the incident.

In March 2006, a Unity employee was blamed in the shooting of a 72-year-old Australian at a checkpoint in Baghdad. The victim, Professor Kays Juma, had been a resident of Baghdad for 25 years and drove through the city every day. It was alleged that he sped up his vehicle as he approached the guards.

In May 2016, a bodyguard died at the Australian embassy in Baghdad when shot in the head after a night of drinking with URG colleagues. A coroner found that the former Australian soldier had shot himself by accident.
