= Val Teixeira =

Portuguese footballer

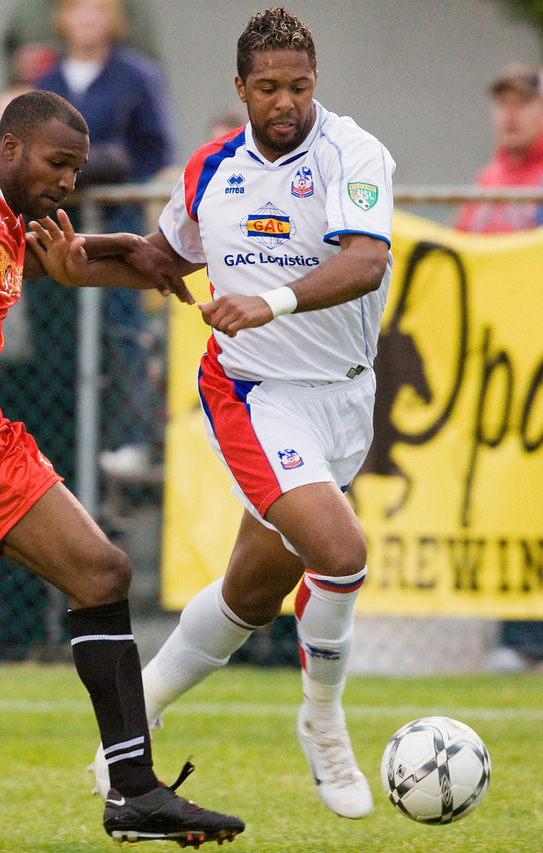

Personal information
- Full name: Valdemar Lereno Goncalves Gomes Teixeira
- Date of birth: 26 March 1977 (age 49)
- Place of birth: Lisbon, Portugal
- Height: 6 ft 3 in (1.91 m)
- Positions: Full back; centre back; winger; forward

Youth career
- 1983: Amora
- 1993–1994: Benfica

College career
Years	Team	Apps	(Gls)
1994–1995	Newbury Nighthawks		

Senior career*
Years	Team	Apps	(Gls)
1999–2004	Rhode Island Stingrays	75	(17)
2002	→ Sanjoanese (loan)		
2004–2007	New Hampshire Phantoms	68	(12)
2008–2010	Crystal Palace Baltimore	58	(14)
2008	→ Chesterfield (loan)	5	(0)
2011	Real Maryland	20	(8)
2012–2014	Harrisburg Heat (indoor)	21	(11)
2014	Pennsylvania Roar (indoor)	2	(1)
2014–2018	Harrisburg Heat (indoor)	71	(35)

International career
1990	Portugal U-13	1	(1)
- * Club domestic league appearances and goals as of August 9, 2011

Valdemar "Val" Teixeira (born 26 March 1977) is a Portuguese footballer.

== Career ==
=== Youth and college ===
Teixeira began his career playing for Amora FC in Portugal at the age of 6. At age 13, Teixeira was called up by Carlos Queiroz, Portugal's then-national team coach to represent Portugal U-13 in a Mini World Cup Tournament in Lisbon. At the age of 15, Teixeira received the honour to represent Portugal again in a tournament in Viseu that included teams from Cape Verde, Angola, and Mozambique.

In 1993, aged 16, Teixeira signed a contract with Benfica to play for the juniors team under the management of Professor Jose Morais former assistant coach for, Real Madrid, Chelsea Football Club under Manager Jose Mourinho. In August 1994, Teixeira moved to the United States, settling in Somerville, Massachusetts. He attended Somerville High School, scoring 28 goals and 14 assists his junior year, helping the team reach the state finals and being named Greater Boston League MVP, Boston Herald Athlete of the Year and a 1st Team All-American.

Teixeira later played one year of college soccer at Newbury College, playing 18 games and finishing his season with 13 goals and 5 assists as a center back.

=== Professional ===
Teixeira's professional career began when he signed a 4-year contract with the Rhode Island Stingrays of the USL Second Division in 1999. In 2002, Teixeira returned to Portugal to spend a short loan period playing for second division AD Sanjoanense, before returning to the US to finish the season with the Stingrays.

In 2004, Teixeira signed a 4-year contract with the New Hampshire Phantoms, also of the USL Second Division, and helped the team reach the USL2 semi-finals, eventually losing to Charlotte Eagles.

Teixeira joined Crystal Palace Baltimore in 2008, and went on trial with parent club Crystal Palace in August the same year. He played a reserved game with Palace UK vs Dagenham and Redbridge, scoring 1 goal and getting 2 assists on the 5-1 win over the Redbridge, but was not offered a contract, despite manager Neil Warnock stating: “He’s done well, he’s got something but we don’t feel he’s going to be just quite right for the Championship at the moment". Teixeira later joined Chesterfield on trial, and scored a hat-trick for their reserve team against Wolves, which led to him being signed to an on loan contract. He made his debut for the Spireites on 27 September 2008, coming on as a second-half substitute for Jamie Lowry in a game against Brentford. While playing for Chesterfield, Teixeira played friendly matches vs Aston Villa, Sheffield United, Leeds United, Doncaster Rovers.

He was released by Chesterfield at the conclusion of his loan period, returning to Baltimore in January 2009 to resume his career with Baltimore. In July, Crystal Palace UK went over to the US to take on their Crystal Palace US team; the final score was 5-2. Teixeira scored the 1-1 equalizer when Palace UK was up 1-0 before halftime. On 16 March 2010, Baltimore announced the re-signing of Teixeira to a new contract for the 2010. In April 2010, Teixeira was given an honorable mention by USLsoccer.com, the official website of USL, as one of the best and most influential USL Second Division Players of the past decade. Teixeira, 33, made his USL-2 debut in 1999 and is currently in his third season with Crystal Palace Baltimore. The versatile Portuguese veteran served as the club's captain in 2008, 2009 and 2010. In the summer of 2011, Teixeira joined Real Maryland FC PDL team as a player coach for the Monarcs for the 2011 and 2012 season. In December 2012, Teixeira signed a professional contract late in the season with the Professional indoor team Harrisburg Heat of the PASL, scoring 4 goals and 3 assists in 5 games. Teixeira is currently under contract with the Heat in the MASL (Major Arena Soccer League).

== Coaching ==
Teixeira started his coaching career in 2001 with the Boys Varsity at Stoughton High School in Stoughton, Massachusetts. With his help, the team improved from a 1-10-7 record to 10-4-4 becoming the Hockmock Champions in 2004. In 2005, Teixeira became the Director of a Soccer Academy for ages 4 to 14 at New England Sports Academy, training over 120 kids on a weekly basis. Teixeira then founded a Soccer Club called NESA FC Lions in 2006. In 2008 Teixeira moved to Baltimore, MD to play professionally for Crystal Palace Baltimore. He then started coaching at SAC (Soccer Association of Columbia)MD the U-15 SAC Wolves Girls and assisting the U-14 SAC Girls. In 2009, he won the August Cup in Germantown, MD with the U-14 Girls and WAGS Division 2. In April 2010, his SAC Wolves Girls team won the Arlington invitational Tournament in VA, 2010 SAC Columbus Day Tournament Champions, November 2010 he won the Richmond Strickers Tournament in VA with the U-16 SAC Wolves and the WAGS Spring Season Div.3 Champions in 2011. The Wolves team went on a perfect season playing 30 games winning all 30 games without allowing any goals including league games and tournaments. The Wolves team were Finalists at the Maryland Presidents Cup in 2012. In August 2010, Teixeira volunteered as a coach at Goucher College for the Women's program and took the assistant coaching job at Loyola Blakefield HS in Maryland, the boys were Champions in 2012 season winning the MIAA A Conference. Teixeira was offered the head coaching job with U-14 Premier Baltimore Girls (Premier Soccer Club) in 2011, the team won five times the MD State Cup in 2010, 2011, 2012, 2013 and 2014. PSC Baltimore also won the Bethesda Tournament at age U-15 Girls in the top bracket Potomac Division Champions in 2012. In 2013, 2014 PDA College Showcase Tournament Champions. The team currently competes at the highest level in the country playing in the National League, Region 1 and the highest tournaments all over the country. The PSC Baltimore team has been ranked top 5 in the country since 2012 and averages over 150 college coaches during Tournament to recruit his players. Teixeira is currently the head coach at Notre Dame Prep's Varsity. Notre Dame Prep is an All-Girls school located in Towson, Maryland. They compete in the A conference in the MIAA. Teixeira also works summer camps for Maryland University, College Park. He has helped numerous players from his teams receive a soccer scholarship and commit to Division 1,2,3 from all over the country. Teixeira is the owner and director of coaching for Portuguese Touch Soccer a training soccer school he founded in Baltimore, MD in 2010. In May 2013, Teixeira became the (DOC) Director of Coaching for Premier Soccer Club.
