= Trinity College, Moka =

Anglican school in Trinidad and Tobago

Location
- 10.72066°N 61.49911°W

Information
- Funding type: Private school (1958-1959); State school (1959-present)
- Established: 1958; 68 years ago
- Gender: Boys; Mixed (since 1987, sixth form only)

Trinity College is an Anglican, government-assisted secondary school, located in Maraval, Trinidad and Tobago.

== History ==
Trinity College was founded as a private secondary school in January 1958 at Melbourne Street in Port of Spain.

It was established through the efforts of the Very Rev. B. Vaughn, M.A., then Dean of the Cathedral of the Holy Trinity, and the Anglican Diocese to provide a sound secondary education for boys. This developed from the earlier project organized by the Cathedral Parish which showed the need for a secondary school.

In January 1959, upon application, the college became a government-assisted secondary school and thus became a public secondary school. Students are admitted in Form 1 on the basis of the Common Entrance Examination, and above Form 1 with the approval of the Ministry of Education based on their performance on transfer tests to other approved criteria.

From September 1987, girls have been admitted, but only in the sixth form.

== Mission ==
The stated mission of Trinity College is to provide a balanced general education to all its students to assist them to develop all of their abilities so that all its students to become culturally aware, socially conscious and lifelong learners. The motto of Trinity College is "Courage and Courtesy" which goes back to 1960.
