= Kirk von Ackermann =

American contractor

- Born: c. 1966
- Disappeared: October 9, 2003; Iraq
- Status: Presumed dead
- Died: October 9, 2003 (aged 37); Iraq
- Occupation: Intelligence officer
- Spouse: Megan von Ackermann
- Children: 3

Kirk von Ackermann (c. 1966 – 9 October 2003) was an American contractor who disappeared in Iraq in 2003. His family was given a "presumption of death of a citizen abroad" certificate three years later. He has not been officially declared dead.

== Early life ==
Von Ackermann was an intelligence officer in the United States Air Force, and had previously served as a Russian linguist in the United States Army. Among his roles in the Air Force was that of "former Deputy Director of Intelligence for NATO operations in Kosovo in 1999, where he had been decorated for operations behind enemy lines."

== Disappearance ==
He was employed by Ultra Services of Istanbul, Turkey when he disappeared in Iraq on October 9, 2003. His car was found empty on a road between Kirkuk and Tikrit, with his equipment and $40,000 still inside. He had called a colleague, Ryan G. Manelick, a short while earlier to say that he had a flat tire and needed a jack. On December 14, 2003, Ryan G. Manelick was gunned down just after leaving Camp Anaconda. The Major Procurement Fraud Unit (MPFU) at U.S. Army Criminal Investigation Command (USACIDC) is investigating.

The CID have not given a firm conclusion on when or where von Ackermann may have died, although there is a presumption that it may have happened on October 9, 2003, in a botched kidnapping attempt. They still, however, refuse to give out information on his case which is still "active." Von Ackermann's body was never found.

The Defense POW/MIA Accounting Agency lists Von Ackermann as one of five remaining missing servicemen or DOD contractors since the onset of Operation Desert Storm.

== Personal life ==
Before going to Iraq, Von Ackermann was a manager at Siebel Systems, a business software company in San Mateo, California, and living in Moss Beach, California. He is survived by his wife, Megan, and three children.

== See also ==
- List of people who disappeared mysteriously (2000–present)
