= WMSS =

- Middletown, Pennsylvania; United States
- Frequency: 91.1 MHz
- Branding: Super 91

Programming
- Format: Easy Listening, Adult Contemporary, Oldies, Alternative

Ownership
- Owner: Middletown Area School District

History
- First air date: October 1978

Technical information
- Licensing authority: FCC
- Facility ID: 42004
- Class: A
- ERP: 5,500 watts
- HAAT: 17 meters (56 ft)
- Transmitter coordinates: 40°12′44.00″N 76°44′47.00″W

Links
- Public license information: Public file; LMS
- Webcast: Listen live
- Website: wmssfm.com

WMSS (91.1 FM, "Super 91") is a public school-operated high school radio station serving the Harrisburg, Pennsylvania, metropolitan area, licensed to Middletown and owned by the Middletown Area School District. The station serves as a training ground for high school students and offers a block format.

== History ==
WMSS started on September 9, 1977 when two teachers at the G. W. Feaser Jr. High school, Jeff Johnston and John Cooper, applied to the FCC for a construction permit to put a small, 10-watt, FM radio station on the air. On April 5, 1978, the Middletown Area School District was granted a construction permit for a new 10-watt educational FM radio station. WMSS signed on the air on October 2, 1978. Two years later, WMSS raised power to 150 watts. In the mid 1980's, WMSS again raised power to 500 watts. In 1992, WMSS increased power again to 1500 watts and remained there until what was by then called the Feaser Middle School was demolished. The last significant change to WMSS while still located in the Feaser building came on November 1, 1995, when WMSS switched from broadcasting in mono to broadcasting in stereo. Station founders Jeff Johnston and John Cooper were on hand to cut the ribbon when the switch was thrown.

In 2007, the station relocated to new studios in the new Middletown Area Middle School, and began broadcasting from their new home on January 3rd, 2008. Because of the elevation of the new location, WMSS had to reduce power to 450 watts. In 2018, WMSS completed a construction permit that allowed the station to broadcast at a power of 5500 watts, using a 4-bay directional antenna.

The management of WMSS is made up of former students who have graduated from the school district and WMSS. In 1992, John Wilsbach took over the reins from John Cooper as General Manager. Prior to that, Mr. Wilsbach had served as the stations assistant general manager. Middletown Area High School teacher Brian Keyser serves as the Faculty Advisor, with another former student, Tim Starliper, serving as chief engineer. Throughout the years, other teachers within the Middletown Area School District assisted Cooper and Johnston. These include Maureen Denis and Mary Bigelow.

Some notable WMSS graduates include Sweeny Murti (WFAN), Mike Ondayko (98 Rock), Jeni Gipe (WRVV), Scott Green (WTPA), and Dan Magaro (CBS-21). Numerous others have gone into careers in the music industry, legal, technical, I-T, public relations, public service, print media, health care, military, educational, and transportation industries.

== Programming ==
WMSS airs a variety of music formats.

On weekday mornings (from 6 AM to 3 PM), the station airs a unique hybrid of Soft Adult Contemporary/Easy Listening, mainstream Adult Contemporary, and Rhythmic Adult Contemporary formats, generally focusing on material from the 1960s to the 1990s, including very little post-2000 music. This programming segment features a high percentage of songs that were major or moderate hits from the 1970s through 1990s but are essentially "forgotten" today—hence the relatively high prevalence of easy listening songs, as this genre has been abandoned by mainstream AC stations.

After 3 PM on weekdays, and other afternoon times on weekends, the station broadcasts an alternative music format. During the summer months when school is not in session, this is the format for the station throughout the entire broadcast day.

On Saturday mornings (from 7 AM - 12 PM, extended to 4 PM in the summer) and in select time slots on Sunday mornings, the station broadcasts an oldies format with general manager John Wilsbach as the DJ; this is known as the "All Oldies Saturday" and features material exclusively from the 1950s and 1960s, particularly prior to 1964. The station also airs live sports coverage of local high school athletics, Lebanon Valley College athletics, and local church services. It airs numerous educational programs and public service announcements.
