= Corporate Training Unlimited =

"security contracting firm" operating in Iraq

- Industry: Security
- Founded: 1986
- Headquarters: U.S.
- Key people: Donald Feeney Jr. (Founder)
- Services: Security contracting

Corporate Training Unlimited is a security contracting firm. The firm was founded by Donald Feeney Jr. in 1986.

== Founder ==
Don Feeney grew up in Brooklyn, joined the Army at 17, and joined in the Delta Force in 1978, survived the Operation Eagle Claw crash that killed 8 men, and worked in Beirut in 1982. He is a former Delta Force team leader who retired from the US Army with an honorable discharge.

== Repatriating American children ==
CTU focused for some time on recovering children who had been kidnapped into foreign countries, generally kidnapped by the children's fathers who were foreign nationals married to American women. Children kidnapped into countries that were signatories of the Hague Treaty could be helped by the US State Department, but the State Department could take no action in non-signatory countries and warned mothers against "hostile recoveries" by CTU or other Americans. Feeney told Playboy, "Our operations are scams. 95 percent brains. We cannot use weapons or fake documents in foreign countries. If I do, it's federal time."

=== Cathy Mahone ===
In 1988, a mother named Cathy Mahone hired CTU to recover her daughter from Jordan. CTU successfully recovered the child and secreted her into Israel, and the story became the inspiration for the TV movie Desperate Rescue: The Cathy Mahone Story, which led to more publicity and business for the company. The US State Department apologized to Jordan after the mission.

=== 1992 attempt in Iceland ===
In 1992, CTU was retained on behalf of two American citizens, Fred Pittman and Brian Grayson, seeking to locate and repatriate their respective daughters. The girls' Icelandic mother, Erna Eyjólfsdóttir (Erna Pittman Grayson) had taken them to Iceland in violation of Florida court orders. CTU's mission ended unsuccessfully, with the two daughters remaining in Iceland and Feeney and CTU employee Brian Grayson being arrested, tried and convicted of kidnapping in an Icelandic court. Feeney was sentenced to serve two years in prison. In 1993, he escaped from Litla-Hraun prison facility along with another prisoner but both where caught the following day in Vestmannaeyjar where they were waiting for a charter flight from Íslandsflug to take them to the Faroe Islands. He was later released from prison in January 1994.

The event was the subject of an NBC Dateline story titled, "Rambo Goes to Reyjavik." Unhappy with their portrayal, CTU unsuccessfully sued NBC for defamation.

== Iraq Wars ==
The firm sent civilian guards to the war zone during the 1991 Gulf War, and sent civilian guards and bodyguards to Iraq following the US invasion in 2003.

Don Feeney and three CTU employees were arrested on June 5, 2009 by Iraqi police investigating the murder of American Jim Kitterman in Baghdad's "Green Zone".

The Washington Post reported that the five suspects were arrested by Iraqi authorities following a tip from the FBI., and the AP reported they were arrested during the raid on the Corporate Training Unlimited's offices and barracks because their weapons permits had expired. Iraqi officials initially suspected that two of the men were involved in the murder.

Later, CNN quoted officials at the US Embassy who stated the five men were not suspected of the murder. CNN reported that "a source close to the suspect" said that all five had alibis. Three of the contractors were later released on June 11 due to lack of evidence. Milligan and Jones, who were held longer by the FBI, were released in July. Iraqi witnesses testified in the ICCC (Iraqi Central Criminal Court) that Kitterman's murder was committed by another American who himself was killed not long afterward. Larry Eugene Young, a CTU employee, was killed by mortar fire in the Green Zone on the same day as Kitterman's murder.
