= Ryan G. Manelick =

American defense contractor

Ryan G. Manelick (December 14, 1972 – December 14, 2003) was an American defense contractor who was shot and killed in Iraq.

He was employed by Ultra Services of Istanbul, Turkey when he was killed in Baghdad, Iraq on December 14, 2003, his birthday, just after leaving Camp Anaconda. He was survived by three children.

On October 9, 2003 his Ultra Services colleague, Kirk von Ackermann disappeared. Shortly before his disappearance, Ackermann had called Manelick using his satellite phone to say that he had had a flat tire on a deserted Iraqi road and needed a jack. Manelick found von Ackermann's car abandoned about 45 minutes later. His satellite phone, laptop computer, and, a briefcase holding $40,000 was still inside. The case was investigated by Major Procurement Fraud Unit (MPFU) at U.S. Army Criminal Investigation Command (HQCID). Ackermann was never found.

Manelick graduated from Conestoga Valley High School in 1991.

== See also ==
- Jim Kitterman
