= Dayton Dynamo (2016–2018) =

- Founded: 2009 (as Cincinnati Saints)
- Dissolved: 2019; 7 years ago
- Ground: Roger Glass Stadium
- Capacity: 2,150
Home colors	Away colors

Dayton Dynamo were an outdoor soccer club based in Dayton, Ohio. The club was originally established in Cincinnati, Ohio, by David Satterwhite. In 2017, Satterwhite sold the club to Cincinnati sports investor Jared Davis who immediately paused operations before dissolving the organization in 2019 after a yearlong playing hiatus. They last participated in the National Premier Soccer League in the fourth tier of American soccer in 2017.

== History ==
The team was originally known as the Cincinnati Saints and played in the affiliated amateur Premier Arena Soccer League. In Cincinnati, the Saints home arena was the Western Sports Mall in Cincinnati, Ohio. Starting in May 2014, the Saints played outdoor soccer as an expansion team in the Great Lakes Conference of the National Premier Soccer League. In November 2015, the Saints announced their intentions to move the club to Dayton, Ohio. The Saints officially became the Dayton Dynamo in 2016 in honor of the city's historic indoor soccer team.

=== The Saints Era (2009-2015) ===
The Saints played in the amateur Premier Arena Soccer League for four seasons, from 2009 to 2013. The club moved to the Professional Arena Soccer League for the 2013–14 season, playing in the Eastern Division under the leadership of head coach Chris Morman. The team finished their first and only professional season as the Saints fourth in their division, qualifying for the playoffs. In 2014, Cincinnati moved to the semi-professional National Premier Soccer League, playing outdoor soccer.

==== 2013–14 season ====
The Cincinnati Saints began their PASL run with a win over the Cleveland Freeze but lost six of their next eight matches. With 7 games remaining in the regular season, only the Illinois Piasa carried a worse record in the Eastern Division and the team parted ways with original head coach Matt Brienes on January 8, naming former player Chris Morman as his interim replacement. The Saints also participated in the 2013–14 United States Open Cup for Arena Soccer starting with a bye in the Round of 32 and a 10–6 loss to the Cleveland Freeze in the Round of 16, ending their tournament run. The Cincinnati Saints participated in the 2013–14 United States Open Cup for Arena Soccer starting with a bye in the Round of 32 and a 10–6 loss to the Cleveland Freeze in the Round of 16, ending their tournament run.

==== 2014–15 season ====
Following the de facto merger of the Professional Arena Soccer League with 6 teams from Major Indoor Soccer League and the rebranding of the league to Major Arena Soccer League, Cincinnati moved back to the Premier Arena Soccer League. Morman left the club and David Wall took his place. The club finished 3rd in the Midwest Division with a 7–3 record.

=== The Dynamo Era (2016–2017) ===
In December 2015, it was announced that the Cincinnati Saints were relocating to Dayton, Ohio, and changing their name to the Dayton Dynamo. In their inaugural 2016 campaign, the Dynamo competed in the National Premier Soccer League, Midwest Region, Great Lakes West Conference before moving to the Great Lakes East for 2017. Halfway through the 2016 season, Wall was replaced as coach by his assistant, Dan Griest, who remained in charge through the Dynamo's last game.

After purchasing the team, Jared Davis intentionally paused operations for the 2018 season, promising a fully professional team in 2019. The team never competed again and officially folded on December 31, 2018, when the managing LLC dissolved.

== Players and staff ==
=== Final roster ===
As of May 31, 2017

Note: Flags indicate national team as defined under FIFA eligibility rules; some limited exceptions apply. Players may hold more than one non-FIFA nationality.

No.	Pos.	Nation	Player
00	GK	USA	Robby Frye
0	GK	USA	Ryan Hulings
1	GK	BRA	Paulo Pinto
2	MF	CAN	Joel Twinem
3	DF	SEN	Ibra Kébé Baye
4	MF	USA	Nick Hagenkord
5	DF	USA	Eric Hutton
6	MF	ENG	Kristian Moore-Cowell
7	DF	USA	Christian Johnson
8	MF	ESP	Daniel Ramirez Martin
9	FW	USA	Matt Kinkopf
10	MF	USA	Tate Robertson
11	MF	CAN	Christopher Dupont
12	FW	USA	Tristan Lyle
13	MF	USA	Conner Hughes
14	MF	USA	Jacob Purpero
16	DF	USA	Peyton Mowery
18	DF	USA	Bradley Schluter

No.	Pos.	Nation	Player
19	FW	USA	Bryce Childers
20	DF	USA	Austin Lewis
21	DF	USA	Michael Deyhle
22	FW	USA	Alberto Zaragoza
23	DF	ENG	Krzysztof Rapacz
24	FW	USA	David Janusz
25	DF	USA	Greg Williams
26	DF	USA	Austin Kinley
27	DF	USA	Jared Scarfpin
28	MF	SUI	Angelo Willi
29	DF	USA	Christian Alexander
30	DF	USA	Eric Kissinger
31	MF	USA	Aidan Bean
32	MF	USA	Thor Beckdahl
33	MF	USA	Austin Blair
34	FW	USA	Ryan Kazparzak
35	DF	USA	Jimmy Fultz
36	DF	USA	Devin Dollins

=== Year-by-year ===
League champions	Runners-up	Division champions	Playoff berth

Year	League	Record (W–L–T)	GF	GA	Finish	Playoffs	Avg. attendance
2009–10	PASL	3–4–1	45	38	2nd of 4, Great Lakes Division	Did not qualify	
2010–11	PASL	3–3–2	46	35	4th of 7, Midwest Division	Did not qualify	
2011–12	PASL	6–1–1	57	33	1st of 6, Great Lakes Division	National Finals Qualifier, did not play	
2012–13	PASL	7–0–1	79	16	1st of 10, Midwest Division	National Finals Qualifier, did not play	
2013–14	MASL*	5–11	108	141	4th, Eastern	lost in Divisional First round	341
2014–15	PASL	7–3	64	41	3rd, Midwest Division	Did not qualify	

* The MASL was called the Professional Arena Soccer League until 2014. To make it easier, the abbreviation MASL is used for the professional league and PASL is used for the amateur Premier Arena Soccer League.

=== Year-by-year ===
League champions	Runners-up	Division champions	Playoff berth

Year	League	Record	League Results	Playoffs	Open Cup
2014	NPSL	3–10–1	5th of 5, Midwest-Great Lakes West	Did not qualify	Not eligible
2015	NPSL	4–7–1	10th of 13, Midwest Region	Did not qualify	Not eligible
2016	NPSL	1–10–1	7th of 7, Midwest-Great Lakes West	Did not qualify	Not eligible
2017	NPSL	6–3–3	2nd of 7, Midwest-East	Regional Semi-final	Not eligible
