= 2013–14 Cincinnati Saints season =

Cincinnati Saints
2013–14 PASL season
- President/CEO: David Satterwhite
- Head Coach: Matt Brienes (games 1–9); Chris Morman (games 10–)
- Arena: Tri-County Soccerplex; 530 Northland Blvd. Cincinnati, Ohio 45240
- Ron Newman Cup: Division Semifinal
- US Open Cup: Round of 16
- Highest home attendance: 649 (February 15 vs. Detroit Waza)
- Lowest home attendance: 114 (December 14 vs. Cleveland Freeze)
- Average home league attendance: 341 (8 games)

The 2013–14 Cincinnati Saints season was the first season in the Professional Arena Soccer League (PASL) for the Cincinnati Saints professional indoor soccer club. The Saints, an Eastern Division team, played their home games at the Tri-County Soccerplex in Cincinnati, Ohio. The team was led by general manager Mackenzie Long and interim head coach Chris Morman with assistant coach Kyle Kammer. Matt Brienes was the head coach for the first 9 games of the season before being replaced by Morman. The team finished with a 5–11 record, qualified for the playoffs, and were eliminated in the Eastern Division Semifinal.

== Season summary ==
The Saints began their inaugural pro season with a win over the Cleveland Freeze but over the next 8 games managed only 2 wins, both over the struggling Illinois Piasa. On January 8, team president David Satterwhite announced that head coach Matt Breines "simply wasn't the right fit" for the organization and that he would be replaced by interim head coach Chris Morman for the remainder of the season. The team finished the regular season with a 5–11 record but secured the third spot in the Eastern Division playoffs. They fell to the Cleveland Freeze in the Eastern Division Semifinal.

The Cincinnati Saints participated in the 2013–14 United States Open Cup for Arena Soccer starting with a bye in the Round of 32 and a 10–6 loss to the Cleveland Freeze in the Round of 16, ending their tournament run.

== History ==
The Saints had been a member of the affiliated amateur Premier Arena Soccer League since 2009 before moving up to the pro league in 2013. Starting in May 2014, the Saints organization will also play outdoor soccer during the PASL offseason as an expansion team in the Great Lakes Conference of the National Premier Soccer League.

== Schedule ==
Win Loss

=== Regular season ===
| Game | Day | Date | Kickoff | Opponent | Results | | Location | Attendance |
| Game | Day | Date | Kickoff | Opponent | Final Score | Record | Location | Attendance |
|---|---|---|---|---|---|---|---|---|
| 1 | Saturday | November 2 | 7:35pm | Cleveland Freeze | W 8–7 | 1–0 | Tri-County Soccerplex | 426 |
| 2 | Sunday | November 9 | 7:35pm | Chicago Mustangs | L 7–6 | 1–1 | Tri-County Soccerplex | 314 |
| 3 | Saturday | November 16 | 7:05pm | at Cleveland Freeze | L 9–10 (OT) | 1–2 | Soccer Sportsplex | 388 |
| 4 | Saturday | November 23 | 7:35pm | Illinois Piasa | W 6–4 | 2–2 | Tri-County Soccerplex | 415 |
| 5 | Saturday | November 30 | 7:05pm | at Harrisburg Heat | L 6–8 | 2–3 | Farm Show Complex Equine Arena | 1,458 |
| 6 | Saturday | December 14 | 6:05pm | Cleveland Freeze† | L 6–10 | 2–4 | Tri-County Soccerplex | 114 |
| 7 | Saturday | December 21 | 7:35pm | Illinois Piasa | W 11–2 | 3–4 | Tri-County Soccerplex | 175 |
| 8 | Saturday | December 28 | 7:05pm | at Detroit Waza | L 6–12 | 3–5 | Melvindale Civic Center | 1,011 |
| 9 | Saturday | January 4 | 7:35pm | Detroit Waza | L 4–6 | 3–6 | Tri-County Soccerplex | 225 |
| 10 | Saturday | January 11 | 7:35pm | Harrisburg Heat | W 9–8 | 4–6 | Tri-County Soccerplex | 421 |
| 11 | Saturday | January 18 | 7:05pm | at Harrisburg Heat | L 5–10 | 4–7 | Farm Show Complex Equine Arena | 2,209 |
| 12 | Saturday | January 25 | 7:05pm | at Detroit Waza | L 3–6 | 4–8 | Melvindale Civic Center | 485 |
| 13 | Saturday | February 1 | 7:35pm | at Illinois Piasa | W 8–3 | 5–8 | The Field Sports Complex | 182 |
| 14 | Saturday | February 8 | 7:05pm | at Cleveland Freeze | L 8–17 | 5–9 | Soccer Sportsplex | 436 |
| 15 | Saturday | February 15 | 7:35pm | Detroit Waza | L 7–8 (OT) | 5–10 | Tri-County Soccerplex | 649 |
| 16 | Sunday | February 16 | 4:05pm | at Chicago Mustangs♥ | L 6–23 | 5–11 | Grand Sports Arena | 992 |

† Game also counts for US Open Cup, as listed in chart below.
♥ Postponed from January 5 due to extreme winter weather

=== Post-season ===
| Round | Day | Date | Kickoff | Opponent | Results | | Location | Attendance |
| Round | Day | Date | Kickoff | Opponent | Score | Record | Location | Attendance |
|---|---|---|---|---|---|---|---|---|
| Eastern Division Semifinal | Saturday | March 1 | 7:05pm | at Cleveland Freeze | L 6–11 | 0–1 | Soccer Sportsplex | 471 |

=== U.S. Open Cup for Arena Soccer ===
| Game | Day | Date | Kickoff | Opponent | Results | | Location | Attendance |
| Game | Day | Date | Kickoff | Opponent | Score | Record | Location | Attendance |
|---|---|---|---|---|---|---|---|---|
| Round of 32 | BYE | | | | | | | |
| Round of 16 | Saturday | December 14 | 6:05pm | Cleveland Freeze | L 6–10 | 0–1 | Tri-County Soccerplex | 114 |
