= 2013–14 Premier Arena Soccer League season =

Premier Arena Soccer League
- Season: 2013-14
- Champions: Chicago Mustangs Premier

The 2013–14 Premier Arena Soccer League season consists of 43 teams grouped into 6 divisions across the US. The Premier Arena Soccer League continues to serve as the developmental league to the Professional Arena Soccer League.

== Standings ==
As of March 5, 2014
2013-14 League Championship
2013-14 National Finals Entrant
2013-14 Division Playoff Qualifier (Bold Division Winner, automatic National Finals Qualifier)

Place	Team	GP	W/L	Pct	Pts
Southwestern Division
1	San Diego Sockers Reserves	8	6-2	.750	18
2	Las Vegas Knights	8	5-1-2	.750	17
3	Arizona Impact	8	5-2-1	.688	16
4	Arizona Heat	8	5-3	.625	15
5	Toros Mexico Reserves	8	4-2-2	.625	14
6	Fury Premier	8	2-5-1	.313	7
7	Maracana Tucson	8	1-7	.125	3
8	Arizona United FC	8	1-7	.125	3
Rocky Mountain Division
1	Colorado Blizzard	8	7-1	.875	21
2	FC Denver	8	5-3	.625	15
3	Denver Dynamite	8	4-4	.500	12
4	Oskar Blues FC	8	3-5	.375	9
5	Rocky Mountain Bighorns	8	3-5	.375	9
6	Skyline Eagles FC	8	2-6	.250	6
South Central Division
1	Austin FC	8	6-1-1	.813	19
2	Texas Xtreme	8	5-2-1	.688	16
3	Austin Gunners	8	5-3	.625	15
4	Vitesse Dallas	8	5-3	.625	15
5	Austin Capitals	8	4-4	.500	12
6	Atletico Barcelona	8	2-6	.250	6
7	Wichita B-52s Premier	8	2-6	.250	6
8	Texas Strikers Premier	8	0-8	.000	0
Northwest Division - North
1	Kitsap Pumas	10	8-2	.800	24
2	Arlington Aviators	10	6-2-2	.700	20
3	WSA Rapids	10	4-4-2	.500	14
4	Snohomish Skyhawks	10	4-6	.400	12
5	Wenatchee Fire	10	3-5-2	.400	11
6	Burnaby Titans	10	2-8	.200	6
Northwest Division - South
1	Tacoma Galaxy	8	6-0-2	.875	20
2	Yamhill County Crew	8	4-3-1	.563	13
3	South Sound Shock	8	3-3-2	.500	11
4	Vancouver Tropics	8	0-7-1	.063	1
Midwest Division
1	River City Saints	8	7-0-1	.938	22
2	Illinois Fire	8	5-2-1	.688	16
3	Springfield Demize	8	4-2-2	.625	14
4	Illinois Piasa Premier	8	4-4	.500	12
5	Paducah Premier	8	3-5	.375	9
6	Evansville Kings	8	0-6-2	.125	2
Great Lakes Division
1	Chicago Mustangs Premier	8	8-0	1.000	24
2	FC Indiana Lions	8	5-3	.625	15
3	Detroit Waza Premier	8	3-5	.375	9
4	Chicago Inferno	8	2-6	.250	6
5	Fox Valley Venom	8	2-6	.250	6

== Division Playoffs ==
Northwest Division
Semifinals

- Sat. Feb. 22, 7 pm: Kitsap Pumas 11, Yamhill County Crew 5
- Sat. Feb. 22, 8 pm: Tacoma Galaxy 8, Arlington Aviators 4

Division Championship "Friendly" (Tacoma is official Division Champion regardless of outcome, as Kitsap is unable to travel to Nationals)

- Sat. Mar. 8, 8:30 pm: Tacoma Galaxy 10, Kitsap Pumas 2

Semifinals; February 22
N1	Kitsap Pumas	11
S2	Yamhill County Crew	5
S1	Tacoma Galaxy	8
N2	Arlington Aviators	4

Final; March 8
N1	Kitsap Pumas	2
S1	Tacoma Galaxy	10

South Central Division
Semifinals

- Sat. Mar. 1, 4:30 pm: Vitesse Dallas 6, Austin FC 5
- Sat. Mar. 1, 5:30 pm: Texas Xtreme 12, Austin Gunners 4

Finals

- Sun. Mar. 2, 1:00 pm: Vitesse Dallas 8, Texas Xtreme 5

Semifinals; March 1
1	Austin FC	5
4	Vitesse Dallas	6
2	Texas Xtreme	12
3	Austin Gunners	4

Final; March 2
4	Vitesse Dallas	8
2	Texas Xtreme	5

== 2013-14 PASL-Premier Finals ==
The finals will be played in Hoffman Estates, Illinois, on March 15–16, 2014. Matches will be played at both the Grand Sports Arena and the Sears Centre.

Preliminary Round: Sat. March 15, 2014
2013-14 National Semifinalist

Place	Team	GP	W	L	T	GF	GA	Pts
Group A
1	Vitesse Dallas	3	2	0	1	16	6	7
2	Chicago Mustangs Premier	3	2	1	0	10	6	6
3	Tacoma Galaxy	3	1	1	1	12	10	3
4	Illinois Fire	3	0	3	0	6	22	0
Group B
1	River City Saints	3	2	0	1	15	9	7
2	Colorado Blizzard	3	2	1	0	13	13	6
3	FC Indiana Lions	3	1	2	0	12	16	3
4	Springfield Demize	3	0	2	1	9	11	1

@ Grand Sports Arena

- 9:00 am - Chicago Mustangs Premier 6, Illinois Fire 0
- 9:00 am - Tacoma Galaxy 3, Vitesse Dallas 3
- 9:45 am - River City Saints 4, Springfield Demize 4
- 9:45 am - Colorado Blizzard 7, FC Indiana Lions 6
- 10:30 am - Tacoma Galaxy 8, Illinois Fire 4
- 10:30 am - Vitesse Dallas 5, Chicago Mustangs Premier 1
- 11:15 am - Colorado Blizzard 3, Springfield Demize 2
- 11:15 am - River City Saints 6, FC Indiana Lions 2

@ Sears Centre

- 1:00 pm - Vitesse Dallas 8, Illinois Fire 2
- 1:45 pm - Chicago Mustangs Premier 3, Tacoma Galaxy 1
- 2:30 pm - FC Indiana Lions 4, Springfield Demize 3
- 3:15 pm - River City Saints 5, Colorado Blizzard 3

Knockout Round

Semifinals; March 16
A1	Vitesse Dallas	5
B2	Colorado Blizzard	1
B1	River City Saints	1
A2	Chicago Mustangs Premier	5

Final; March 16
A1	Vitesse Dallas	4
A2	Chicago Mustangs Premier	7

Sun. March 16, 2014
Semifinals (@ Sears Centre)

- 11:00 am - Vitesse Dallas 5, Colorado Blizzard 1
- Noon - Chicago Mustangs Premier 5, River City Saints 1

Finals (@ Sears Centre)

- 1:15 pm - Chicago Mustangs Premier 7, Vitesse Dallas 4
