= F.C. Indiana (NPSL) =

American men's soccer team

FC Indiana
- Full name: Football Club Indiana
- Nickname: The Lions
- Founded: 2000; 26 years ago
- Stadium: Legacy Sports Club Stadium; Lafayette, IN
- Capacity: 2,000
- Chairman: David Bugay
- League: Premier Arena Soccer League, National Premier Soccer League
| Home colors | Away colors |

F.C. Indiana, also known as F.C. Indiana Lions, is an American men's soccer team based in Lafayette, Indiana. Founded in 2000, the team compete in the Premier Arena Soccer League indoor soccer league. The Lions also play in the National Premier Soccer League (NPSL), a national outdoor league at the fourth tier of the American Soccer Pyramid.

The men's club are affiliated with the F.C. Indiana women's team.

== History ==
The Lions formed a men's adult team in 2006 and entered play in the PASL 2006–07 Winter season. The team then played outdoors in the NPSL 2007 season.

The team went hiatus for the 2008–09 season and returned to play both leagues in 2009. After their second NPSL campaign the team played exclusively indoor soccer for five seasons. In early December 2014 the team announced it would return to the NPSL for the 2015 season.

=== 2019 season ===
2019 NPSL Great Lakes Conference Standings

| Pos | Team | Pld | W | L | T | GF | GA | GD | Pts | Qualification |
|---|---|---|---|---|---|---|---|---|---|---|
| 1 | Detroit City FC (C) | 14 | 10 | 1 | 3 | 39 | 6 | +33 | 33 | Midwest Region Semifinals |
| 2 | AFC Ann Arbor | 14 | 9 | 2 | 3 | 25 | 10 | +15 | 30 | Midwest Region Quarterfinals |
| 3 | Grand Rapids FC | 14 | 9 | 3 | 2 | 24 | 12 | +12 | 29 | |
| 4 | Kalamazoo FC | 14 | 6 | 3 | 5 | 18 | 13 | +5 | 23 | |
| 5 | FC Columbus | 14 | 4 | 8 | 2 | 18 | 23 | −5 | 14 (Note: FC Columbus and Michigan Stars FC were equal on head-to-head points (2-2) and head-to-head goal difference (0-0).) | |
| 6 | Michigan Stars FC | 14 | 3 | 6 | 5 | 14 | 17 | −3 | 14 | |
| 7 | Toledo Villa FC | 14 | 2 | 11 | 1 | 11 | 38 | −27 | 7 | |
| 8 | FC Indiana | 14 | 1 | 10 | 3 | 8 | 38 | −30 | 6 | |

Source: NPSL standings
Rules for classification: 1) points; 2) head to head; 3) goal differential in head-to-head results; 4) wins; 5) total goal differential; 6) fewest losses; 7) coin toss. If three or more teams are tied on points, a mini-table involving only the tied teams is used, and teams are ranked in the mini-table on points. If two teams are tied on points in the mini-table, the two-team rules for classification apply. If three or more teams are tied on points in the mini-table, they are ranked based on 1) wins in conference competition; 2) total goal differential in conference competition; 3) fewest losses in conference competition; 4) coin toss.
(C) Champions

== Year-by-year ==
Outdoor History
| Season | League | Regular season W-D-L | Playoffs | U.S. Open Cup |
|---|---|---|---|---|
| 2007 | NPSL | 0–0–10; 6th, Midwest | did not qualify | Ineligible |
| 2008 | On Hiatus | | | |
| 2009 | NPSL | 2–1–5; 5th, Midwest | did not qualify | Ineligible |
No team fielded between 2010 & 2014
| 2015 | NPSL | 2–3–7; 11th, Midwest | did not qualify | Ineligible |
| 2016 | NPSL | 0–2–8; 6th, Great Lakes East | did not qualify | did not qualify |
| 2017 | NPSL | 1–1–12; 8th, Great Lakes | did not qualify | did not qualify |
| 2018 | NPSL | 0–0–12; 7th, Great Lakes | did not qualify | did not qualify |
| 2019 | NPSL | 1–3–10; 8th, Great Lakes | did not qualify | did not qualify |
| 2020 | NPSL | Season cancelled due to COVID-19 pandemic | | |

Indoor History
| Season | League | Regular season W-D-L | Playoffs | U.S. Open Cup |
|---|---|---|---|---|
| 2006–07 | PASL | 2–0–6; 3rd, Great Lakes | did not qualify | – |
| 2007–08 | PASL | 1–0–5; 4th, Great Lakes | did not qualify | – |
| 2008–09 | PASL | On Hiatus | | |
| 2009–10 | PASL | 3–1–2, 3rd Midwest | did not qualify | Round of 16 |
| 2010–11 | PASL | 4–0–4, 3rd Midwest | did not qualify | Qualifying Group Stage |
| 2011–12 | PASL | 2–1–5, 6th Great Lakes | did not qualify | did not participate |
| 2012–13 | PASL | 5–0–3, 3rd Midwest | did not qualify | Qualifying Elimination Round |
| 2013–14 | PASL | 5–0–3, 2nd Great Lakes | Group Stage | Indiana Qualifying Final |
| 2014–15 | PASL | 2–0–8, 9th Midwest | did not qualify | – |
| 2015–16 | PASL | 4–0–4, 2nd Midwest | did not qualify | – |
| 2016–17 | PASL | 5–1–2, 2nd Central | Group stage | – |
| 2017–18 | PASL | 4–0–1, 1st Great Lakes | Quarterfinals | – |
| 2018–19 | PASL | On Hiatus | | |
| 2019–20 | PASL | 4–1–2, 4th Great Lakes | Delayed to August 2020 | – |

== Stadiums ==
- Kuntz Stadium; Indianapolis, Indiana (2007)
- Goshen Soccer Park; Goshen, Indiana 2 games (2007)
- Scheumann Stadium; Lafayette, Indiana (2009–12)
- Legacy Sports Club; Lafayette, Indiana (2012–present)
