= 2013–14 Cleveland Freeze season =

Cleveland Freeze
2013–14 PASL season
- General Manager: Scott Snider
- Head Coach: Hector Marinaro
- Arena: Soccer Sportsplex; 31515 Lorain Road; North Olmsted, Ohio 44070
- Professional Arena Soccer League: 2nd, Eastern
- Ron Newman Cup: 4th place
- US Open Cup: Semi-final
- Highest home attendance: 703 (November 10 vs Harrisburg Heat)
- Lowest home attendance: 343 (January 4 vs Illinois Piasa)
- Average home league attendance: 481 (8 games)

The 2013–14 Cleveland Freeze season was the first season of the Cleveland Freeze professional indoor soccer club. The Freeze, an Eastern Division team in the Professional Arena Soccer League, played their home games at the Soccer Sportsplex in the Cleveland suburb of North Olmsted, Ohio. The team was led by general manager Scott Snider and head coach Hector Marinaro with assistant coach Bruce Miller.

The Freeze earned a 10–6 record in their inaugural regular season and two players were named to the PASL's All-League second team. Cleveland advanced to the Final Four but lost their semi-final match to the Chicago Mustangs.

== Season summary ==
The Cleveland Freeze lost their first PASL match by one goal to the expansion Cincinnati Saints, won their next three matches (including an overtime win over Cincinnati), then lost to the Detroit Waza and the division-leading Chicago Mustangs. The team found its footing again with another win over Cincinnati then won their next five matches as well. They swept season series over the Harrisburg Heat (4 games) and the Illinois Piasa (2 games).

The Freeze finished the regular season with a 10–6 record, good enough for third place in the Eastern Division and a post-season berth. Cleveland beat the Cincinnati Saints 11–6 in the Eastern Division Semifinal then topped the Detroit Waza 6–5 in the Division Final to advance to the PASL Final Four in Chicago. The Freeze fell 10–3 to the Chicago Mustangs in the semi-final match. Cleveland lost again, this time to the Las Vegas Legends in the consolation match on March 16.

The Freeze participated in the 2013–14 United States Open Cup for Arena Soccer starting with a bye in the Round of 32 and 10–6 win over the Cincinnati Saints on December 14, 2013, in the Round of 16. The Freeze defeated the Harrisburg Heat in the Quarter-finals on Saturday, December 28, and advanced to the Semi-finals. They lost to the Chicago Mustangs on February 22, ending their tournament run.

== Broadcast ==
The entire season, home and away games, are being broadcast online by AmericaOne Sports.

== Awards and honors ==
On January 14, 2014, the Professional Arena Soccer League named midfielder Stefan Ostergren as the PASL Player of the Week. The league cited his outstanding offensive efforts, including 11 consecutive multi-point games and 18 points in Cleveland's three most recent matches.

On February 11, 2014, the PASL announced that defender Josh Grossman and forward Allen Eller would share the spotlight as league's Player of the Week. The league cited Grossman's 7 goals and Eller's PASL-record 8 assists in their team's critical victory over the Cincinnati Saints.

On February 26, 2014, the PASL announced its "All-League" honors. Forward Allen Eller and defender Josh Grossman were named to the All-League Second Team.

== Schedule ==
Win Loss

=== Regular season ===
Game	Day	Date	Kickoff	Opponent	Results		Location	Attendance
Game	Day	Date	Kickoff	Opponent	Final Score	Record	Location	Attendance
1	Friday	November 2	7:30pm	at Cincinnati Saints	L 7-8	0-1	Tri-County Soccerplex	426
2	Sunday	November 10	3:05pm	Harrisburg Heat	W 11-3	1-1	Soccer Sportsplex	703
3	Saturday	November 16	7:05pm	Cincinnati Saints	W 10–9 (OT)	2–1	Soccer Sportsplex	388
4	Saturday	November 23	7:05pm	at Harrisburg Heat	W 10–7	3–1	Farm Show Equine Arena	1,050
5	Saturday	November 30	7:05pm	at Detroit Waza	L 7–8	3–2	Melvindale Civic Center	613
6	Friday	December 13	7:05pm	Chicago Mustangs	L 4–13	3–3	Soccer Sportsplex	448
7	Saturday	December 14	6:05pm	at Cincinnati Saints†	W 10–6	4–3	Tri-County Soccerplex	114
8	Friday	December 20	8:35pm	at Illinois Piasa	W 7–5	5–3	The Field Sports Complex	142
9	Sunday	December 22	4:05pm	Harrisburg Heat	W 12–4	6–3	Soccer Sportsplex	431
10	Saturday	December 28	7:05pm	at Harrisburg Heat†	W 12–5	7–3	Farm Show Equine Arena	1,581
11	Saturday	January 4	7:05pm	Illinois Piasa	W 27–6	8–3	Soccer Sportsplex	343
12	Saturday	January 11	7:05pm	Detroit Waza	W 14–11	9–3	Soccer Sportsplex	594
13	Saturday	January 18	6:05pm	at Chicago Mustangs	L 11–20	9–4	Grand Sports Arena	684
14	Saturday	February 1	7:05pm	at Detroit Waza	L 7–17	9–5	Melvindale Civic Center	575
15	Saturday	February 8	7:05pm	Cincinnati Saints	W 17–8	10–5	Soccer Sportsplex	436
16	Sunday	February 16	3:05pm	Detroit Waza	L 7–8	10–6	Soccer Sportsplex	506

† Game also counts for US Open Cup, as listed in chart below.

=== Post-season ===
Round	Day	Date	Kickoff	Opponent	Results		Location	Attendance
Round	Day	Date	Kickoff	Opponent	Score	Record	Location	Attendance
Eastern Division Semifinal	Saturday	March 1	7:05pm	Cincinnati Saints	W 11–6	1–0	Soccer Sportsplex	471
Eastern Division Final	Saturday	March 8	7:05pm	at Detroit Waza	W 6–5	2–0	Melvindale Civic Center	1,218
PASL Semifinal	Saturday	March 15	7:30pm	at Chicago Mustangs	L 3–10	2–1	Sears Centre	3,863
Third Place	Sunday	March 16	2:30pm	Las Vegas Legends	L 6–7	2–2	Sears Centre	1,763

=== U.S. Open Cup for Arena Soccer ===
Round	Day	Date	Kickoff	Opponent	Results		Location	Attendance
Round	Day	Date	Kickoff	Opponent	Score	Record	Location	Attendance
Round of 32	BYE							
Round of 16	Saturday	December 14	6:05pm	at Cincinnati Saints	W 10–6	1–0	Tri-County Soccerplex	114
Quarter finals	Saturday	December 28	7:05pm	at Harrisburg Heat	W 12–5	2–0	Farm Show Equine Arena	1,581
Semi finals	Saturday	February 22	4:00pm	Chicago Mustangs	L 10–15	2–1	Grand Sports Arena	455
