= 2012–13 Premier Arena Soccer League season =

40-team league season running from 2012-13

Premier Arena Soccer League
- Season: 2012-13
- Champions: Bladium Rosal

The 2012–13 Premier Arena Soccer League season consists of 46 teams grouped into 6 divisions across the US. The Premier Arena Soccer League continues to serve as the developmental league to the Professional Arena Soccer League.

== Standings ==
As of March 9, 2013
2012-13 League Championship
2012-13 National Finals Entrant
2012-13 Division Playoff Qualifier (Bold Division Winner, automatic National Finals Qualifier)

Place	Team	GP	W/L	Pct	Pts
Southwestern Division
1	San Diego Sockers Reserves	8	8-0	1.000	24
2	Las Vegas Knights	8	7-1	.875	21
3	Phoenix Falcons	9	5-4	.556	15
4	Real Phoenix Reserves	8	4-4	.500	12
5	Maracana Tucson	8	3-5	.375	9
6	Toros Mexico Reserves	8	2-6	.250	6
7	Docemas	8	2-6	.250	6
8	Arena Soccer Parks	7	1-6	.143	3
Rocky Mountain Division
1	Colorado Blizzard	8	5-1-2	.833	17
2	FC Denver	8	5-3	.625	15
3	Denver Dynamite	8	3-4-1	.429	10
4	CSC Cavalry	8	1-6-1	.143	4
South Central Division
1	Vitesse Dallas	8	7-1	.875	21
2	Alamo City Warriors	9	7-2	.778	21
3	Austin Gunners	9	6-3	.667	18
4	Texas Xtreme	8	4-3-1	.571	13
5	Austin FC	9	2-6-1	.250	7
6	Tyler Threat	8	2-6	.250	6
7	Texas Strikers Reserves	7	1-6	.143	3
8	Ninos Soccer Club	2	0-2	.000	0
Northwest Division
1	South Sound Shock	8	7-0-1	.938	22
2	Kitsap Pumas	8	6-1-1	.857	19
3	Wenatchee Fire	8	5-3	.625	15
4	WSA Rapids	8	4-3-1	.571	13
5	Arlington Aviators	8	4-4	.500	12
6	Snohomish Skyhawks	8	3-4-1	.429	10
7	Oregon Blacktails	8	2-6	.250	6
8	Marysville Ruckus	8	2-6	.250	6
9	Tumwater Pioneers	8	1-7	.125	3
Midwest Division
1	Cincinnati Saints	8	7-0-1	.938	22
2	River City Legends	8	5-3	.625	15
3	Detroit Waza Reserves	8	5-3	.625	15
4	FC Indiana Lions	8	5-3	.625	15
5	Windy City Panthers	8	5-3	.625	15
6	Chicago Mustangs Reserves	8	3-4-1	.429	10
7	Paducah Premier	8	3-4-1	.429	10
8	Springfield Demize	8	2-4-2	.333	8
9	Evansville Crush	8	1-6-1	.143	4
10	Rockford Rampage Reserves	8	0-6-2	.125	2
Pacific Division
1	OTW Santa Clara	8	8-0	1.000	24
2	Bladium Rosal	8	6-2	.750	18
3	Soccer Academy FC	8	3-5	.375	9
4	Chico Bigfoot	8	2-6	.250	6
5	Sacramento Sting	8	1-7	.125	3

== Division Playoffs ==
Northwest Division
Semifinals

- Fri. Feb. 15, 8:15 pm: Kitsap Pumas 12, Wenatchee Fire 2
- Fri. Feb. 15, 8:30 pm: South Sound Shock 8, WSA Rapids 7

Finals

- Sun. Feb. 17, 1:00 pm: South Sound Shock 7, Kitsap Pumas 4

South Central Division
Semifinals

- Sat. Feb. 16, 5:15 pm: Vitesse Dallas 6, Texas Xtreme 3
- Sat. Feb. 16, 7:00 pm: Austin Gunners 4, Alamo City Warriors 2

Finals

- Sun. Feb. 17, 1:00 pm: Vitesse Dallas 9, Austin Gunners 8

Midwest Division
Finals

- Sat. Feb. 16, 7:30 pm: Cincy Saints 6, River City Legends 2

== 2012-13 PASL-Premier Finals ==
The finals will be played at San Diego, California, on March 10–11, 2013.

=== Preliminary round ===
(Preliminary Round games consists of two 18 minute halves.)

Place	Team	GP	W/L	Pct	GF	GA
Group Stage
1	Detroit Waza Reserves	2	2-0	1.000	12	7
2	Colorado Blizzard	2	2-0	1.000	9	4
3	South Sound Shock	2	1-0-1	.750	9	4
4	Bladium Rosal	2	0-0-2	.500	4	4
5	San Diego Sockers Reserves	2	0-1-1	.250	3	4
6	Las Vegas Knights	2	0-2	.000	6	12
7	OTW Santa Clara	2	0-2	.000	6	14

Sun. March 10, 2013

- 9:00 AM - South Sound Shock 7, Las Vegas Knights 2
- 9:45 AM - San Diego Sockers Reserves 2, Bladium Rosal 2
- 10:30 AM - Colorado Blizzard 7, OTW Santa Clara 3
- 11:15 AM - Detroit Waza Reserves 5, Las Vegas Knights 4
- 12:00 PM - South Sound Shock 2, Bladium Rosal 2
- 12:45 PM - Colorado Blizzard 2, San Diego Sockers Reserves 1
- 1:30 PM - Detroit Waza Reserves 7, OTW Santa Clara 3

=== Knockout round ===
Mon. March 11, 2013
Quarterfinals (two 18 minute halves)

- Detroit Waza Reserves (Bye)
- 9:45 AM - Bladium Rosal 5, San Diego Sockers Reserves 3
- 10:30 AM - South Sound Shock 5, Las Vegas Knights 3
- 11:15 AM - Colorado Blizzard 7, OTW Santa Clara 3

Semifinals (two 18-minute halves)

- 1:00 PM - Bladium Rosal 6, Detroit Waza Reserves 2
- 1:45 PM - Colorado Blizzard 6, South Sound Shock 0

Final (four 10-minute periods)

- 5:45 PM - Bladium Rosal 4, Colorado Blizzard 1

Quarterfinals; March 11
4	Bladium Rosal	5
5	San Diego Sockers Reserves	3
3	South Sound Shock	5
6	Las Vegas Knights	3
2	Colorado Blizzard	7
7	OTW Santa Clara	3

Semifinals; March 11
4	Bladium Rosal	6
1	Detroit Waza Reserves	2
2	Colorado Blizzard	6
3	South Sound Shock	0

Final; March 11
4	Bladium Rosal	4
2	Colorado Blizzard	1
