= 2013–14 Illinois Piasa season =

Illinois Piasa
2013–14 PASL season
- Owner: Jim Williams
- Head Coach: Doug Montroy (games 1–10); Ed Rulo (games 11–15)
- Arena: The Field Sports Complex; 4141 Highway 111; Pontoon Beach, Illinois 62040
- US Open Cup: Round of 32
- Highest home attendance: 496 (November 1 vs. Tulsa Revolution)
- Lowest home attendance: 109 (January 11 vs. Chicago Mustangs)
- Average home league attendance: 299 (8 games)

The 2013–14 Illinois Piasa season was the eighth season of the Illinois Piasa professional indoor soccer club and fourth as a franchise in the Professional Arena Soccer League. The Piasa, named for the Piasa Bird of Native American legend, are an Eastern Division team who played their home games at The Field Sports Complex in Pontoon Beach, Illinois.

The team was led by general manager Matt Williams and interim head coach Ed Rulo. The Pizazz Dance Team was led by Danielle Lusicic-Wise. Former player Doug Montroy led the team as head coach for the first 10 games of the season before being dismissed "with the best interests of both parties in mind". Ed Rulo served out the season as interim coach,

== Season summary ==
The Piasa season started strong under rookie head coach Doug Montroy with a home win over the expansion Tulsa Revolution but the team lost its next 9 games. Many of the losses were by 1 or 2 goals but the January 4 loss to the Cleveland Freeze by a score of 27–6 set several league records and Cleveland fell one short of the PASL record of 28 goals by one team in a game. Roster instability, lack of practice time, and reduced payroll were among the reasons cited by the coach for the team's struggles on and off the field. Montroy was replaced as head coach by his assistant, Ed Rulo, beginning with the January 11 game against the Chicago Mustangs. The team averaged just 299 fans per home game, the 18th-best draw in the 20-team league.

The Illinois Piasa participated in the 2013–14 United States Open Cup for Arena Soccer, losing their Round of 32 game against the independent Chicago-based A.A.C. Eagles on Saturday, December 14, 2013, by a score of 7–4.

== Schedule ==
Win Loss

=== Regular season ===
Game	Day	Date	Kickoff	Opponent	Results		Location	Attendance
Game	Day	Date	Kickoff	Opponent	Score	Record	Location	Attendance
1	Friday	November 1	7:35pm	Tulsa Revolution	W 7–4	1–0	The Field Sports Complex	496
2	Saturday	November 9	7:05pm	at Wichita B-52s	L 8–9	1–1	Hartman Arena	1,943
3	Saturday	November 16	7:05pm	at Chicago Mustangs	L 2–15	1–2	Grand Sports Arena	805
4	Saturday	November 23	7:35pm	at Cincinnati Saints	L 4–6	1–3	Tri-County Soccerplex	415
5	Saturday	November 30	7:35pm	Wichita B-52s	L 7–8	1–4	The Field Sports Complex	538
6	Saturday	December 7	7:35pm	Detroit Waza	L 5–9	1–5	The Field Sports Complex	368
7	Friday	December 20	7:35pm	Cleveland Freeze	L 5–7	1–6	The Field Sports Complex	142
8	Saturday	December 21	7:35pm	at Cincinnati Saints	L 2–11	1–7	Tri-County Soccerplex	175
9	Saturday	December 28	7:05pm	at Chicago Mustangs	L 0–8	1–8	Grand Sports Arena	598
10	Saturday	January 4	7:05pm	at Cleveland Freeze	L 6–27	1–9	Soccer Sportsplex	343
11	Saturday	January 11	7:35pm	Chicago Mustangs	L 1–13	1–10	The Field Sports Complex	109
12	Saturday	January 18	7:05pm	at Wichita B-52s	L 5–11	1–11	Hartman Arena	1,826
13	Saturday	February 1	7:35pm	Cincinnati Saints	L 3–8	1–12	The Field Sports Complex	182
14	Saturday	February 8	7:35pm	Harrisburg Heat	W 4–3	2–12	The Field Sports Complex	206
15	Saturday	February 15	7:35pm	Wichita B-52s	L 3–6	2–13	The Field Sports Complex	353
16	Saturday	February 22♥	7:00pm	at Detroit Waza	CANCELLED	2–13	Melvindale Civic Center	N/A

♥ Postponed from January 5 due to extreme winter weather then postponed again from January 26 due to a scheduling conflict

=== U.S. Open Cup for Arena Soccer ===
Game	Day	Date	Kickoff	Opponent	Results		Location	Attendance
Game	Day	Date	Kickoff	Opponent	Score	Record	Location	Attendance
Round of 32	Saturday	December 15	7:35pm	A.A.C. Eagles	L 4–7	0–1	The Field Sports Complex	107
