= 2012–13 Ohio Vortex season =

Ohio Vortex
2012–13 PASL season
- Executive Director: Jodi Wayble
- Head Coach: Denzil Antonio
- Arena: Pinnacle Sports Complex; Medina, Ohio
- PASL: 5th, Eastern
- US Open Cup: Round of 16
- Highest home attendance: 311 (November 3, 2012) vs Rockford Rampage
- Lowest home attendance: 112 (December 22, 2012) vs Harrisburg Heat
- Average home league attendance: 210 (over 8 home games)

The 2012–13 Ohio Vortex season was the fourth season of the Ohio Vortex indoor soccer club. The Vortex, an Eastern Division team in the Professional Arena Soccer League, played the majority of their home games at the Pinnacle Sports Complex in Medina, Ohio. The team was led by executive director Jodi Wayble and head coach Denzil Antonio.

== Season summary ==
The Vortex struggled in the regular season, posting a 1–15 record, and failed to advance to the postseason. The team won only one game, against the Illinois Piasa, before dropping the final 13 matches giving the franchise the longest losing streak in the league this season. The franchise struggled off the field as well, drawing only an average of 210 fans per home game, besting just the two Arizona-based teams. The Ohio club's abrupt relocation from Canton 60 miles northwest to Oberlin just before the start of the season then again 30 miles east to Medina after the second home game likely contributed to the team's box office issues.

The Vortex participated in the 2012–13 United States Open Cup for Arena Soccer. They received a bye in the wild-card round then lost to the Detroit Waza in the Round of 16, ending their tournament run.

== Off-field moves ==
Founded in 2008, the Ohio Vortex began play in the 2009–10 season at the Cleveland Metroplex Events Center in Warrensville Heights, Ohio, before settling into the Canton Civic Center in Canton, Ohio. The team, an original member of the Professional Arena Soccer League, followed in the footsteps of the Canton Invaders, a team in the National Professional Soccer League that called Canton home from 1984 through 1996.

On October 26, 2012, one week before the start of the season, the team announced it was moving from Canton to Oberlin, Ohio, for the 2012–13 season and would play their home games at the Gameday Sports Center. After the first two home games, the team relocated to the Pinnacle Sports Complex in Medina, Ohio.

On March 14, 2013, the team began selling off its game uniforms and pre-game warmup shirts via its official Facebook page. The team's official website was taken down in June 2013.

== Roster moves ==
On November 20, 2012, Vortex goalkeeper Mike Mason was named PASL Player of the Week for his role in the team winning its first game of the 2012–13 season. Mason's 18 saves in a 7–0 win against Illinois Piasa constituted the fifth shutout in league history and first since February 2011.

On December 5, 2012, the Vortex announced the signing of midfielder Joe Salem. An Akron, Ohio, native with professional experience on the Puerto Rico Islanders of the North American Soccer League, Salem is also an assistant coach at Highland High School.

== Schedule ==
Win Tie Loss

=== Regular season ===
Game	Day	Date	Kickoff	Opponent	Results		Location	Attendance
Game	Day	Date	Kickoff	Opponent	Final score	Record	Location	Attendance
1	Saturday	November 3	7:35pm	Rockford Rampage	L 1–6	0–1	Gameday Sports Center §	311
2	Saturday	November 10	7:30pm	at Detroit Waza	L 1–12	0–2	Taylor Sportsplex	437
3	Saturday	November 17	7:35pm	Illinois Piasa	W 7–0	1–2	Gameday Sports Center §	205
4	Saturday	November 24	7:05pm	at Harrisburg Heat	L 1–13	1–3	Farm Show Arena	1,864
5	Saturday	December 8	7:35pm	Detroit Waza†	L 3–13	1–4	Pinnacle Sports Complex	176
6	Saturday	December 15	7:35pm	Cincinnati Kings	L 2–10	1–5	Pinnacle Sports Complex	243
7	Saturday	December 22	7:35pm	Harrisburg Heat	L 2–9	1–6	Pinnacle Sports Complex	112
8	Saturday	December 29	7:05pm	at Harrisburg Heat	L 2–9	1–7	Farm Show Arena	1,705
9	Friday	January 4	7:35pm	Detroit Waza	L 2–8	1–8	Pinnacle Sports Complex	160
10	Saturday	January 5	7:35pm	Cincinnati Kings	L 3–10	1–9	Pinnacle Sports Complex	219
11	Saturday	January 19	7:35pm (8:35pm Eastern)	at Illinois Piasa	L 4–10	1–10	The Sports Academy	319
12	Sunday	January 20	6:00pm	at Cincinnati Kings	L 2–12	1–11	GameTime Training Center	161
13	Saturday	February 2	7:30pm	at Detroit Waza	L 1–19	1–12	Taylor Sportsplex	367
14	Saturday	February 9	7:35pm (8:35pm Eastern)	at Illinois Piasa	L 5–14	1–13	The Sports Academy	397
15	Sunday	February 10	6:00pm	at Cincinnati Kings	L 1–16	1–14	GameTime Training Center	344
16	Saturday	February 16	7:35pm	Harrisburg Heat	L 3–8	1–15	Pinnacle Sports Complex	259

† Game also counts for US Open Cup, as listed in chart below.
§ Team began season at Gameday Sports Center; relocated to Pinnacle Sports Complex for final six home games.

=== 2012–13 US Open Cup for Arena Soccer ===
Game	Date	Kickoff	Opponent	Results		Location	Attendance
Game	Date	Kickoff	Opponent	Final score	Record	Location	Attendance
Wild Card	BYE						
Round of 16	December 8	7:35pm	Detroit Waza	L 3–13	0–1	Pinnacle Sports Complex	176
