= Kansas City Kings (disambiguation) =

== Basketball (NBA) ==
- 1972–1985, became Sacramento Kings: Home court was Kemper Arena.

== Indoor Soccer ==
- Kansas City Kings PASL-Premier A soccer team who plays in suburban north Kansas City, MO
