= 2012–13 Illinois Piasa season =

Illinois Piasa
2012–13 PASL season
- Owner: Jim Williams
- Head Coach: Jason Norsic
- Arena: The Sports Academy; Glen Carbon, Illinois
- PASL: 4th, Eastern
- US Open Cup: Round of 16
- Highest home attendance: 515 (November 3, 2012)) vs Detroit Waza
- Lowest home attendance: 178 (November 9, 2012) vs Rockford Rampage
- Average home league attendance: 329 (over 8 home games)

The 2012–13 Illinois Piasa season was the seventh season of the Illinois Piasa indoor soccer club and third as a franchise in the Professional Arena Soccer League. The Piasa, named for the Piasa Bird of Native American legend, are an Eastern Division team who played their home games in The Sports Academy in Glen Carbon, Illinois. The team was led by owner Jim Williams and head coach Jason Norsic.

== Season summary ==
The team struggled in the regular season, compiling a 4–12 record. They placed fourth in the five-team Eastern Division and failed to advance to the postseason. The team fared better at home than on the road with all four of their wins coming on home turf. Two of the Piasa's four wins came against the Ohio Vortex but Illinois also provided Ohio with its only win of the season.

The Piasa participated in the 2012–13 United States Open Cup for Arena Soccer. They received a bye in the wild-card round then lost to the Chicago Mustangs in the Round of 16, ending their tournament run.

== Off-field moves ==
For the 2012–13 season, the team named former goalkeeper Jason Norsic as head coach. He replaced both Joe Reiniger and Justin McMillian who had previously shared coaching duties. Norsic played college soccer at Southwestern Illinois College and McKendree University before playing professionally for the St. Louis Steamers, Swanner United FC, St. Louis Illusion, Piasa FC, and Illinois Piasa.

The team's official sportswear for the 2012–13 season was supplied by Admiral Sportswear, the world's oldest soccer brand.

The Piasa's dance team for the 2012-13 season, the Piasa Pizazz Pro Dance Team, was led by Danielle Lusicic-Wise.

At the November 9, 2012, home game, the team organized a canned food drive for a food bank in the St. Louis, Missouri, area. Fans received a discount on tickets when they presented a canned food donation at the box office.

== Awards and honors ==
On December 11, 2012, the Professional Arena Soccer League named rookie goalkeeper Alan Hagerty as the Player of the Week. The league cited his 32 saves and second-half shutout of rival Rockford Rampage on December 3, leading the Piasa to their first win of the season.

== Schedule ==
Win Tie Loss

=== Regular season ===
Game	Day	Date	Kickoff	Opponent	Results		Location	Attendance
Game	Day	Date	Kickoff	Opponent	Final Score	Record	Location	Attendance
1	Saturday	November 3	7:35pm	Detroit Waza	L 5–11	0–1	The Sports Academy	515
2	Friday	November 9	7:35pm	Rockford Rampage	L 7–10	0–2	The Sports Academy	178
3	Saturday	November 10	7:35pm	at Chicago Mustangs	L 8–16	0–3	Grand Sports Arena	459
4	Saturday	November 17	7:35pm (6:35pm Central)	at Ohio Vortex	L 0–7	0–4	Gameday Sports Center	205
5	Sunday	November 18	2:30pm (1:30pm Central)	at Detroit Waza	L 4–12	0–5	Taylor Sportsplex	353
6	Sunday	December 9	3:35pm	Rockford Rampage	W 5–2	1–5	The Sports Academy	188
7	Friday	December 14	8:00pm (7:00pm Central)	at Cincinnati Kings	L 4–5	1–6	GameTime Training Center	206
8	Saturday	December 15	5:30pm	at Chicago Mustangs†	L 8–15	1–7	Grand Sports Arena	299
9	Saturday	January 5	4:30pm	Chicago Mustangs	L 6–7	1–8	The Sports Academy	360
10	Friday	January 11	7:35pm	Cincinnati Kings	W 7–4	2–8	The Sports Academy	362
11	Saturday	January 12	7:05pm	at Rockford Rampage	L 1–8	2–9	Victory Sports Complex	200
12	Saturday	January 19	7:35pm	Ohio Vortex	W 10–4	3–9	The Sports Academy	319
13	Saturday	January 26	7:05pm (6:05pm Central))	at Harrisburg Heat	L 5–10	3–10	Farm Show Arena	2,517
14	Saturday	February 2	7:35pm	Cincinnati Kings	L 3–5	3–11	The Sports Academy	315
15	Saturday	February 9	7:35pm	Ohio Vortex	W 14–5	4–11	The Sports Academy	397
16	Saturday	February 16	8:00pm (7:00pm Central)	at Cincinnati Kings	L 2–11	4–12	GameTime Training Center	284

† Game also counts for US Open Cup, as listed in chart below.

=== 2012–13 US Open Cup for Arena Soccer ===
Game	Date	Kickoff	Opponent	Results		Location	Attendance
Game	Date	Kickoff	Opponent	Final Score	Record	Location	Attendance
Wild Card	BYE						
Round of 16	December 15	4:30pm	at Chicago Mustangs	L 8–15	0–1	Grand Sports Arena	299
