= Arizona Impact =

- Founded: 2013
- Ground: Arizona Sports Complex; Glendale, Arizona
- Capacity: 500
- Owners: Patrick Fisher & Craig Meyer
- Head Coach: Mike Cudmore
- League: MASL2
- Website: http://www.arizonaimpact.com
| Home colors | Away colors |

Arizona Impact were an American indoor soccer team, founded in 2013. The Arizona Impact competed in the Premier Arena Soccer League and Major Arena Soccer League 2 and played their home matches at the Arizona Sports Complex in Glendale, Arizona.

Former indoor soccer professional player Rick Soderman was named the first Arizona Impact head coach in October 2013. Soderman had a seven-year career (1993–2000) playing with six teams. Soderman resigned as head coach on November 16, 2015 and was replaced by team captains Ryan Hays and Ami Hanan on an interim basis. Mike Cudmore was named head coach on January 27, 2016.

== Women ==
The club also fielded a women's team, Impact FC to which Rick Soderman was named head coach of in May 2014. In the 2014 PASL Summer National Tournament Impact FC won a four-team tournament to be crowned summer national champions.

== Year-by-year ==
| Year | Win | Loss | Tie | League | Reg. season | Playoffs |
|---|---|---|---|---|---|---|
| 2013-14 | 5 | 2 | 1 | Premier Arena Soccer League | 3rd, Southwest | Did not qualify |
| 2014 Summer | 7 | 1 | 0 | Premier Arena Soccer League | 1st, Southwest | National Semifinal |
| 2015-16 | 4 | 3 | 1 | Premier Arena Soccer League | 2nd, Southwest | Did not enter |
| 2016-17 | 5 | 1 | 2 | Premier Arena Soccer League | 1st, Southwest | National Quarterfinals |
| 2017-18 | 3 | 9 | 0 | Major Arena Soccer League 2 | 5th, Western | Did not qualify |

== Honors ==
=== Men's team ===
- PASL 2014 Summer Season Southwestern Division Champions
- PASL 2016-2017 Southwestern Division Champions

=== Women's team ===
- 2014 PASL Women's Champions
