= Joe Reiniger =

American soccer player and coach

Personal information
- Date of birth: December 7, 1970 (age 55)
- Place of birth: Collinsville, Illinois, United States
- Height: 6 ft 0 in (1.83 m)
- Position: Forward

College career
Years	Team	Apps	(Gls)
- SIU Edwardsville Cougars

Senior career*
Years	Team	Apps	(Gls)
1993–2000	St. Louis Ambush (indoor)	248	(386)
2000	St. Louis Steamers (indoor)	13	(15)
2000–2004	Milwaukee Wave (indoor)	129	(103)
2004–2006	St. Louis Steamers (indoor)	55	(38)
2008–2010	St. Louis Illusion (indoor)	8	(18)
2011–2013	Illinois Piasa (indoor)	7	(6)

Managerial career
- 2005–2006: St. Louis Steamers (interim)
- 2011–2013: Illinois Piasa (co-manager)
- * Club domestic league appearances and goals

Joe Reiniger (born December 7, 1970, in Collinsville, Illinois) is a professional soccer player and coach. He grew up in Caseyville.

Reiniger has played forward for the St. Louis Ambush, Milwaukee Wave, and the St. Louis Steamers. He went to college at Southern Illinois University Edwardsville and graduated in 1993. He was selected in the first round of the NPSL amateur draft by the Ambush in 1993, and was named to the 1993-94 NPSL All-Rookie Team. While playing with the Wave, he was the MVP of the 2001 NPSL Championship. His number is 21. He plays forward and is left footed, but right-handed. He's married to Kim, and has a daughter named Jordyn. He resides in Collinsville.

During the 2005–06 season while St. Louis Steamers head coach Omid Namazi was on a suspension, he served as the head coach.

On April 1, 2006, he scored his 600th career goal in front of 8,795 fans at the Savvis Center in St. Louis, Missouri. Retro jerseys were being worn by the players that night and were auctioned to the fans. The winning bidder of Reiniger's jersey bought it for 950 dollars and gave it back to him.

In September 2006, the Steamers were placed on the inactive list for the 2006–2007 season and the MISL had a draft. The Milwaukee Wave got the rights of Reiniger, but he did not sign a contract with them.

In November 2008, he signed with the St. Louis Illusion in the Professional Arena Soccer League.

In September 2011, he joined the Illinois Piasa as co-head coach for the 2011–12 season.
