= 2017–18 Major Arena Soccer League 2 season =

Major Arena Soccer League 2
- Season: 2017–18
- Champions: Chicago Mustangs
- Matches played: 60
- Goals scored: 910 (15.17 per match)
- Top goalscorer: Thomas Hoang (33)
- All statistics correct as of March 4, 2018.

The 2017–18 Major Arena Soccer League 2 season is the first season for the league M2. The regular season started on December 2, 2017, and ended on March 4, 2018. Each team will play a 12-game schedule.

== Standings ==
As of March 4, 2018
2017-18 League Championship
2017-18 Playoff Team
(Bold) Division Winner

=== Eastern Conference ===
Place	Team	GP	W	L	Pct	GF	GA	GB
1	Chicago Mustangs	12	10	2	.833	114	61	--
2	Cincinnati Swerve	12	9	3	.750	83	65	1
3	Colorado Blizzard	12	7	5	.583	93	88	3
4	Muskegon Risers	12	3	9	.250	77	114	7
5	Waza Flo	12	2	10	.167	60	101	8

=== Western Conference ===
Place	Team	GP	W	L	Pct	GF	GA	GB
1	Colorado Inferno FC	12	8	4	.667	122	90	--
2	San Diego Sockers 2	12	7	5	.583	88	64	1
3	Ontario Fury II	12	7	5	.583	108	104	1
4	Las Vegas Knights SC	12	4	8	.333	73	121	4
5	Arizona Impact	12	3	9	.250	93	101	5

== 2018 M2 Championship ==
The top three teams from each division qualified for the post-season. The championship will be a single elimination playoff to be held at the SoccerHaus in Colorado Springs, Colorado except the Western Conference Semi-Final, which will be played in San Diego.

Conference Semi-Finals

March 10, 2018
1:30 PM PST
Western

San Diego Sockers 2	11–7	Ontario Fury II
	Report

Valley View Casino Center
March 24, 2018
9:00 AM MDT
Eastern

Cincinnati Swerve	8–6	Colorado Bizzard
	Report

SoccerHaus

Conference Finals

March 24, 2018
4:30 PM MDT
Eastern

Chicago Mustangs	9–2	Cincinnati Swerve
	Report

SoccerHaus
March 24, 2018
7:30 PM MDT
Western

San Diego Sockers 2	11–10 (OT)	Colorado Inferno FC
	Report

SoccerHaus

3rd Place Game

March 25, 2018
10:30 AM MDT

Colorado Inferno FC	13–10	Cincinnati Swerve
	Report

SoccerHaus

Final

March 25, 2018
1:00 PM MDT

Chicago Mustangs	7–0	San Diego Sockers 2
	Report

SoccerHaus

== Awards ==
=== Individual awards ===
Award	Name	Team
League MVP	Thomas Hoang	Colorado Inferno FC
Goalkeeper of the Year	Jesus Flores	Chicago Mustangs
Defender of the Year	Matt Marcum	Arizona Impact
Coach of the Year	Armando Gamboa	Chicago Mustangs

=== All-League First Team ===
Name	Position	Team
Thomas Hoang	F	Colorado Inferno FC
Alonso Sandoval	F	Chicago Mustangs
Francisco Rivas	M	Colorado Inferno FC
Emmanuel Adjei	D	Cincinnati Swerve
Matt Marcum	D	Arizona Impact
Jesus Flores	GK	Chicago Mustangs

=== All-League Second Team ===
Name	Position	Team
Patricio Barroche	F	Chicago Mustangs
Andrew Lorei	F	San Diego Sockers 2
William Raygoza	M	Ontario Fury II
Eli Galbraith-Knapp	D	San Diego Sockers 2
Miles Mcrae	D	Las Vegas Knights
Corey Whisenhunt	GK	Cincinnati Swerve
