= Steve Gillespie =

American soccer player

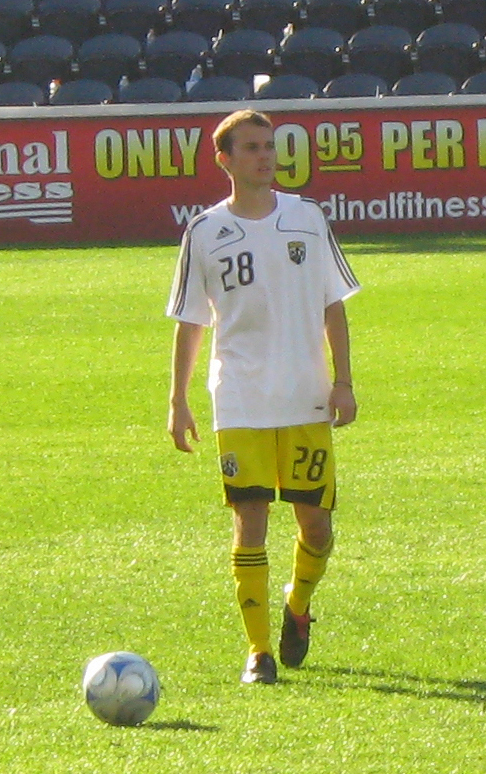

Personal information
- Full name: Steven Gillespie
- Date of birth: August 2, 1985 (age 41)
- Place of birth: Brecksville, Ohio, United States
- Height: 5 ft 9 in (1.75 m)
- Position: Midfielder

Youth career
- 2004–2007: Mount Union College

Senior career*
Years	Team	Apps	(Gls)
2006–2007	Cleveland Internationals	15	(2)
2008	Columbus Crew	2	(0)
2009–2010	Cleveland City Stars	6	(1)
2009–2012	Ohio Vortex (indoor)	42	(29)
2013–2014	Cleveland Freeze (indoor)	19	(18)
- * Club domestic league appearances and goals as of 27 September 2016

Steve Gillespie (born August 2, 1985, in Brecksville, Ohio) is an American soccer player who most recently played on the Cleveland Freeze in the PASL. Gillespie has experience playing in the MLS, USL First Division, PASL Pro and the PDL.

== Career ==
=== College and amateur ===
Gillespie attended Brecksville-Broadview Heights High School and played college soccer at Mount Union College, where he was the 2007 Ohio Athletic Conference Midfielder of the Year, was named to All-Great Lakes Region First Team & All-Ohio Athletic Conference First Teams in 2007, the All-Ohio Athletic Conference Second Team in 2006, and was a two-time Mount Union soccer MVP in 2006 and 2007. In 2007, Gillespie was nominated for All-American.

During his college years he also played with Cleveland Internationals in the USL Premier Development League.

=== Professional ===
After spending the 2008 season playing with the Columbus Crew reserves, Gillespie joined the Cleveland City Stars of the USL First Division on April 20, 2009. He later signed with the Ohio Vortex on November 12, 2009, of the PASL where he played four seasons and was captain for two years. During the 2010/11 season, Gillespie finished 5th in the league in assists with 17 overall after playing in 13 games. In the following season, Gillespie scored 14 goals and added 14 assists.

During the 2013/2014 season, Gillespie signed for the Cleveland Freeze of the PASL. During the regular season, in 15 games played, he finished with 12 goals and 15 assists for 27 points. During the team's playoff run, he led the league in points, finishing with 11 that came from 6 goals and 5 assists in 4 games.
