= 2011–12 Premier Arena Soccer League season =

Premier Arena Soccer League
- Season: 2011-12
- Champions: Vitesse Dallas

The 2011–12 Premier Arena Soccer League season consisted of 35 teams grouped into 6 divisions across the US. The Premier Arena Soccer League continues to serve as the developmental league to the Professional Arena Soccer League.

== Standings ==
As of March 10, 2012
2011-12 League Championship
2011-12 National Finals Entrant
2011-12 Division Playoff Qualifier (Bold Division Winner, automatic National Finals Qualifier)

Place	Team	GP	W/L	Pct	Pts
Southwest Division
1	Las Vegas Knights	8	6-2	.750	18
2	Deft Touch	8	6-2	.750	18
3	San Diego Sockers Reserves	8	5-2-1	.688	16
4	CF Revolucion Tijuana	8	5-3	.625	15
5	Arizona Heat	8	5-3	.625	15
6	Maracana Tucson	8	3-5	.375	9
7	Avondale United	8	1-7	.125	3
8	Anaheim Bolts Reserves	8	0-7-1	.063	1
Rocky Mountain Division
1	Colorado Blizzard	8	8-0	1.000	24
2	Denver Dynamite	8	3-4-1	.438	10
3	Fort Collins Fury	8	3-4-1	.438	10
4	Edwards Freedom	8	0-6-2	.125	2
South Central Division
1	Vitesse Dallas	8	6-1-1	.813	19
2	Austin Gunners	8	4-2-2	.625	14
3	Alamo City Warriors	8	3-4-1	.438	10
4	Dallas Drillers	8	3-5	.375	9
5	Texas Xtreme	8	2-6	.250	6
Northwest Division
1	Kitsap Pumas	8	6-0-2	.875	20
2	WSA Rapids	8	5-2-1	.688	16
3	Snohomish Skyhawks	8	3-4-1	.438	10
4	South Sound Shock	8	3-4-1	.438	10
5	Wenatchee Fire	8	3-4-1	.438	10
6	Marysville Ruckus	8	1-7	.125	3
Midwest Division
1	Illinois Fire	8	7-1	.875	21
2	Louisville Rayo	8	6-2	.750	18
3	Springfield Demize	8	5-2-1	.688	16
4	Paducah Premier	8	4-3-1	.563	13
5	Evansville Crush	8	1-7	.125	3
6	Futskilz Fusion	8	0-8	.000	0
Great Lakes Division
1	Cincinnati Saints	8	6-1-1	.813	19
2	Cincinnati Kings Reserves	8	4-4	.500	12
3	Detroit Waza Reserves	8	3-3-2	.500	11
4	Waukegan Lightning	8	3-4-1	.438	10
5	Indy Elite FC	8	3-4-1	.438	10
6	FC Indiana Lions	8	2-5-1	.313	7

== Division Playoffs ==
Northwest Division
Semifinals

- Sat. Feb. 18, 7:00 pm: Kitsap Pumas 7, South Sound Shock 6 (Penalty Kicks)
- Sat. Feb. 18, 7:15 pm: WSA Rapids 10, Snohomish Skyhawks 6

Finals

- Sat. Feb. 25, 7:00 pm: WSA Rapids 8, Kitsap Pumas 4

Southwest Division
Postseason

- "Battle of the Borders"
  - Sat. Feb. 25, 6:00 pm: CF Revolucion Tijuana 8, Las Vegas Knights 7 (Penalty Kicks)
- Division Championship
  - Sat. Mar. 3, 5:30 pm: Las Vegas Knights 18, Deft Touch 6

Great Lakes Division
Finals

- Sat. Mar. 3, 6:00 pm: Cincinnati Saints 12, Cincinnati Kings Reserves 8

Midwest Division
Finals

- Sat. Feb. 25, 7:30 pm: Louisville Rayo 7, Illinois Fire 6 (Penalty Kicks)

Rocky Mountain Division
Finals

- Fri. Feb. 17, 10:45 pm: Colorado Blizzard 7, Denver Dynamite 3 (Doubles as Regular Season Match)

== 2011-12 PASL-Premier Finals ==
The finals were played at San Diego, California, on March 9–10, 2012.

=== Preliminary round ===
(Preliminary Round games consists of two 18 minute halves.)

Place	Team	GP	W/L	Pct	GF	GA
Group A
1	Las Vegas Knights	3	2-1	.667	10	7
2	WSA Rapids	3	2-1	.667	12	9
3	Colorado Blizzard	3	1-1-1	.500	8	8
4	San Diego Sockers Reserves	3	0-2-1	.167	3	9
Group B
1	Vitesse Dallas	3	3-0	1.000	21	8
2	Deft Touch	3	2-1	.667	16	15
3	Louisville Rayo	3	0-2-1	.167	11	14
4	CF Revolucion Tijuana	3	0-2-1	.167	10	21

Fri. March 9, 2012

- 10:15 AM – WSA Rapids 3, San Diego Sockers Reserves 0
- 11:00 AM – Colorado Blizzard 2, Las Vegas Knights 1
- 11:45 AM – Deft Touch 9, CF Revolucion Tijuana 4
- 12:30 PM – Vitesse Dallas 5, Louisville Rayo 4
- 1:15 PM – Las Vegas Knights 5, WSA Rapids 4
- 2:00 PM – Colorado Blizzard 2, San Diego Sockers Reserves 2
- 2:45 PM – Vitesse Dallas 8, CF Revolucion Tijuana 2
- 3:30 PM – Deft Touch 5, Louisville Rayo 3

Sat. March 10, 2012

- 10:15 AM – Las Vegas Knights 4, San Diego Sockers Reserves 1
- 11:00 AM – WSA Rapids 5, Colorado Blizzard 4
- 11:45 AM – Vitesse Dallas 8, Deft Touch 2
- 12:30 PM – Louisville Rayo 4, CF Revolucion Tijuana 4

=== Knockout round ===
Sat. March 10, 2012
Semifinals (two 18 minute halves)

- 2:00 PM – Las Vegas Knights 4, Deft Touch 3 (Shootout 3-2)
- 2:45 PM – Vitesse Dallas 4, vs. WSA Rapids 1

Final (four 10-minute periods)

- 5:05 PM – Vitesse Dallas 5, Las Vegas Knights 3

Semifinals; March 10
1A	Las Vegas Knights	4
2B	Deft Touch	3
1B	Vitesse Dallas	4
2A	WSA Rapids	1

Final; March 10
Las Vegas Knights	3
Vitesse Dallas	5
