= 2011–12 Illinois Piasa season =

Illinois Piasa
2011–12 season
- Owner: Jim Williams
- Head Coach: Joe Reiniger and Justin McMillian
- Arena: The Sports Academy; Glen Carbon, Illinois

The 2011–12 Illinois Piasa season was the sixth season of the Illinois Piasa indoor soccer club and second as a franchise in the Professional Arena Soccer League. The Piasa, named for the Piasa Bird of Native American legend, were an Eastern Division team who played this season's home games at The Sports Academy in Glen Carbon, Illinois. The team was led by co-head coaches Joe Reiniger and Justin McMillian.

== Off-field moves ==
In September 2011, the Piasa signed a multi-year deal to make The Sports Academy the team's new home arena. That same month, the team hired both Joe Reiniger and Justin McMillian to serve as co-head coaches for the 2011–12 season. Reiniger played professionally for the St. Louis Ambush, Milwaukee Wave, and St. Louis Steamers, and was selected as the Most Valuable Player of the 2001 National Professional Soccer League Championship. McMillian's playing career included stops with the Indiana Blast, St. Louis Steamers, and St. Louis Illusion.

The team also announced that player Elvir Kafedžić would serve as assistant coach. Both he and co-head coach Justin McMillian remained on the active roster.

Before the team's final home game of the regular season on February 11, 2012, the Piasa honored St. Louis soccer legend Dragan "Don" Popović with a halftime ceremony. A native of Yugoslavia, Popović made his American professional debut with the St. Louis Stars in 1967. He was inducted into the St. Louis Soccer Hall of Fame in 2004 and member of the inaugural class by the Indoor Soccer Hall of Fame in October 2011.

== Roster moves ==
Illinois Piasa conducted two open tryouts for new players in September 2011. The tryouts were held on their home turf at The Sports Academy in Glen Carbon, Illinois.

== Schedule ==
Win Tie Loss

=== Regular season ===
Game	Day	Date	Kickoff	Opponent	Results		Location	Attendance
Game	Day	Date	Kickoff	Opponent	Final score	Team record	Location	Attendance
1	Saturday	November 5	7:35pm	Kansas Magic	L 9–11	0–1	The Sports Academy	658
2	Saturday	November 12	7:35pm	at Kansas Magic	L 3–4	0–2	EPIC Indoor Sports Center	412
3	Saturday	November 19	7:35pm	Detroit Waza	L 3–4	0–3	The Sports Academy	235
4	Saturday	November 26	7:35pm (6:35pm Central)	at Cincinnati Kings	L 4–10	0–4	Cincinnati Gardens	793
5	Friday	December 2	7:35pm	Louisville Lightning	W 13–9	1–4	The Sports Academy	307
6	Saturday	December 10	7:35pm	Kansas Magic	L 6–7	1–5	The Sports Academy	256
7	Friday	December 16	8:00pm (7:00pm Central)	at Ohio Vortex	W 8–3	2–5	Canton Memorial Civic Center	267
8	Saturday	December 17	7:00pm (6:00pm Central)	at Ohio Vortex	W 9–5	3–5	Canton Memorial Civic Center	137
9	Saturday	January 7	7:30pm (6:30pm Central)	at Louisville Lightning	L 5–15	3–6	Mockingbird Valley Soccer Complex	1106
10	Sunday	January 8	2:35pm (1:35pm Central)	at Detroit Waza	L 3–12	3–7	Taylor Sportsplex	451
11	Saturday	January 14	7:35pm	Cincinnati Kings	W 9–8	4–7	The Sports Academy	280
12	Friday	January 20	7:30pm (6:30pm Central)	at Louisville Lightning	L 4–7	4–8	Mockingbird Valley Soccer Complex	792
13	Saturday	January 21	7:35pm	Cincinnati Kings	W 6–4	5–8	The Sports Academy	402
14	Friday	January 27	7:35pm	Ohio Vortex	W 12–3	6–8	The Sports Academy	413
15	Friday	February 10	8:05pm	at Kansas Magic	L 2–8	6–9	EPIC Indoor Sports Center	79
16	Saturday	February 11	7:35pm	Detroit Waza	L 5–6	6–10	The Sports Academy	605

=== Post-season ===
Game	Day	Date	Kickoff	Opponent	Results		Location	Attendance
Game	Day	Date	Kickoff	Opponent	Final score	Team record	Location	Attendance
Div	Saturday	March 3	7:30pm (6:30pm Central)	at Detroit Waza	L 6–7 (OT)	0–1	Taylor Sportsplex	717
