= Chris Morman =

American soccer player

Personal information
- Full name: Chris Morman
- Date of birth: December 19, 1977 (age 48)
- Place of birth: Troy, Michigan, U.S.
- Height: 6 ft 1 in (1.85 m)
- Position: Defender

College career
Years	Team	Apps	(Gls)
1996–1999	South Carolina Gamecocks		

Senior career*
Years	Team	Apps	(Gls)
2000	Raleigh Express	14	(1)
2001	Nashville Metros	23	(0)
2000–2003	Harrisburg Heat (indoor)	113	(30)
2003–2005	Milwaukee Wave (indoor)	66	(30)
2004	Milwaukee Wave United	24	(0)
2006–2007	Harrisburg City Islanders	33	(2)

International career
	United States futsal	3	(1)

Managerial career
- 2014: Cincinnati Saints (interim)
- * Club domestic league appearances and goals as of November 1, 2008

Chris Morman (born December 19, 1977) is an American retired soccer defender. He played three seasons in the USL First Division, two in the USL Second Division, one in the National Professional Soccer League and four in the Major Indoor Soccer League. He also earned three caps, scoring one goal, with the U.S. national futsal team. In January 2014, he was named interim head coach for the Cincinnati Saints of the Professional Arena Soccer League.

== Career ==
Morman grew up in Tennessee, attending Brentwood High School where he was an All-State soccer player. In 1995, Morman and his teammates won the state championship. He then attended the University of South Carolina where he played on the men's soccer team from 1996 to 1999.

In 2000, he played for the Raleigh Express in the USL A-League. The team folded at the end of the season and that fall he moved to the Harrisburg Heat of the indoor National Professional Soccer League. He would play a total of three seasons with the Heat as the NPSL was renamed the Major Indoor Soccer League for the 2001-2002 and 2002–2003 seasons. In the spring of 2001, Morman signed with the Nashville Metros for the 2001 A-League season but would not play outdoors again until 2003.

When the Heat folded following the 2002–2003 season, the Milwaukee Wave acquired his rights in an August 7, 2003, trade. The Wave game up Victor Nogueira to acquire Morman. He would spend the next two seasons with the Wave organization, playing two winter indoor seasons and the 2004 summer outdoor season with the team. When playing outdoors, the team was known as the Milwaukee Wave United.

In 2006, he moved to the Harrisburg City Islanders of the USL Second Division. In 2007, he won the USL-2 championship with the Islanders. He retired at the end of the season. Morman also earned three caps, scoring one goal, with the U.S. national futsal team.

Following his retirement, he became a retirement plan administrator. On January 8, 2014, he became interim head coach for the Professional Arena Soccer League's Cincinnati Saints, replacing Matt Brienes who had led the team to a 3–6 record in its inaugural season.
