= 2009–10 Premier Arena Soccer League season =

Premier Arena Soccer League
- Season: 2009-10
- Champions: Tacoma Stars

The 2009-10 Premier Arena Soccer League season consists of 8 divisions of 43 teams across the US. The Premier Arena Soccer League continues to serve as the developmental league to the PASL-Pro.

== Standings ==
As of March 8, 2010
2009-10 League Championship
2009-10 National Finals Entrant (Bold Division Winner)

Place	Team	GP	W/L	Pct	Pts
Pacific Division
1	Estadio Azteca All Stars	8	7-1	.875	21
2	OTW Santa Clara	8	6-1-1	.813	19
3	Chico Bigfoot	7	3-3-1	.500	10
4	Sequoia FC	8	3-4-1	.438	10
5	Turlock Express	8	3-5	.375	9
6	Sacramento Scorpions	7	2-4-1	.357	7
7	Merced Atlas	8	1-7	.125	3
Southwest Division
1	San Diego Fusion	8	7-1	.875	21
2	Las Vegas Knights	8	6-2	.750	18
3	Arizona Heat	8	4-2-2	.625	14
4	Los Angeles Bolts	8	2-5-1	.313	7
5	ASC Hammers	8	2-5-1	.313	7
6	San Diego Surf	8	1-7	.125	3
Rocky Mountain Division
1	Edwards Freedom	8	4-1-3	.688	15
2	Northern Colorado Cutthroats	8	5-3	.625	15
3	Fort Collins Fury	8	4-2-2	.625	14
4	Highlands Ranch Heat	8	4-4	.500	12
5	Golden Strikers	8	3-4-1	.438	10
6	Denver Boom	8	1-7	.125	3
South Central Division
1	Vitesse Dallas	8	7-1	.875	21
2	Alamo City Warriors	8	6-1-1	.813	19
3	DFW Tornados	8	5-3	.625	15
4	Niño Soccer Club	8	3-3-2	.500	11
5	FC Austin	8	3-4-1	.438	10
6	Lubbock Lonestar	8	1-6-1	.188	4
7	Tyler Threat FC	8	0-7-1	.063	1
Northwest Division
1	Tacoma Stars	8	6-1-1	.813	19
2	Wenatchee Fire	8	5-3	.625	15
3	WSA Rapids	8	5-3	.625	15
4	Snohomish Skyhawks	8	2-5-1	.313	7
5	Central Oregon Steelheaders	8	1-7	.125	3
Mid Atlantic Division
1	Winchester Impact	8	5-2-1	.688	16
2	F.C. Fredericksburg Generals	8	5-2-1	.688	16
3	Richmond United	8	3-3-2	.500	11
4	Dulles AC	7	2-5	.286	6
Great Lakes Division
1	Waza FC Reserves	6	6-0	1.000	18
2	Cincinnati Saints	8	3-4-1	.438	10
3	West Virginia Quantum Force	6	1-5	.167	3
4	Vortex Premier	7	1-6	.143	3
Midwest Division
1	Kansas City Kings	8	5-2-1	.688	16
3	FC Indiana	6	3-1-2	.667	11
2	Piasa FC	8	3-3-2	.500	11
4	Springfield Demize	8	1-7	.125	3

== Division Playoffs ==
Rocky Mountain Division

Semifinals

Sat. Feb. 20: Edwards Freedom 8, Northern Colorado Cutthroats 7 (OT)

Sun. Feb. 21: Fort Collins Fury 9, Golden Strikers 3

Finals

Sun. Feb. 28: Fort Collins Fury 5, Edwards Freedom 3

South Central Division

Semifinals

Sat. Feb. 20: Vitesse Dallas 9, DFW Tornados 2

Sun. Feb. 21: Alamo City Warriors 12, Niño Soccer Club 10

Finals

Sat. Feb. 27: Vitesse Dallas 8, Alamo City Warriors 6

Northwest Division

Finals

Sat. Feb. 27: Tacoma Stars 6, Wenatchee Fire 1

Mid Atlantic Division

Finals

Sun. Feb. 28: Fredericksburg Generals 10, Winchester Impact 6

== 2009-10 PASL-Premier Finals (at Las Vegas, NV - Mar. 5-6) ==
Preliminary Round (March 5)

Place	Team	GP	W/L	Pct	GF	GA
Group A
1	San Diego Fusion	2	2-0	1.000	10	4
2	Las Vegas Knights	2	1-1	.500	12	6
3	Fort Collins Fury	2	1-1	.500	6	7
4	F.C. Fredericksburg Generals	1	0-1	.000	2	5
5	Waza FC Reserves	1	0-1	.000	2	10
Group B
1	Tacoma Stars	2	2-0	1.000	11	4
2	Arizona Heat	2	1-1	.500	12	7
3	OTW Santa Clara	2	0-2	.000	4	16
Group C
1	Vitesse Dallas	2	2-0	1.000	16	9
2	Kansas City Kings	2	1-1	.500	13	6
3	Los Angeles Bolts	2	0-2	.000	7	21

Knockout Round

Elimination; March 5
A5	Waza FC Reserves	L
A3	Fort Collins Fury	W
A4	F.C. Fredericksburg Generals	3
C3	Los Angeles Bolts	8

Quarterfinals; March 6
C1	Vitesse Dallas	5
B2	Arizona Heat	1
B1	Tacoma Stars	5
A2	Las Vegas Knights	4
A3	Fort Collins Fury	1
D2	Kansas City Kings	5
C3	Los Angeles Bolts	4
A1	San Diego Fusion	1

Semifinals; March 6
C1	Vitesse Dallas	5
B1	Tacoma Stars	7
D2	Kansas City Kings	2(1)
C3	Los Angeles Bolts	2(2)

Championship; March 6
B1	Tacoma Stars	3
C3	Los Angeles Bolts	2
