= Wenatchee Fire =

Wenatchee Fire FC
- Full name: Wenatchee Fire FC
- Nickname: The Fire
- Founded: 2005
- Ground: Wenatchee Valley Sportsplex
- Capacity: 450
- General Manager: Mike Osborn
- Head Coach: Agustin Garcia
- League: Western Indoor Soccer League
- 2014-2015: TBD
Home colors	Away colors

The Wenatchee Fire FC was an American indoor soccer team founded in 2005. WFFC presently compete in the Western Indoor Soccer League. Wenatchee Fire play their home matches at the Wenatchee Valley Sportsplex in Wenatchee, Washington.

The team is a former member of both the Professional Arena Soccer League and Premier Arena Soccer League.

== Year-by-year ==
Year	Win	Loss	Tie	League	Division	Reg. season	Playoffs
2008–2009	2	14	0	PASL-Pro	Western	4th, West	DNQ
2009-2010	5	3	0	PASL-Premier	Northwest	2nd, Northwest	DNQ
2010-2011	4	7	1	PASL-Pro	Frontier	3rd, Frontier	DNQ
2011-2012	3	4	1	PASL-Premier	Northwest	5th, Northwest	DNQ
2012-2013	5	3	0	PASL-Premier	Northwest	3rd, Northwest	DNQ
2013-2014	3	5	2	PASL-Premier	Northwest	3rd, Northwest	1st Round, Northwest
2014-2015	3	4	1	WISL	WISL	3rd	1st Round
Totals	22	36	4				

== Playoff record ==
Year	Win	Loss	GF	GA
2013–2014	0	1	2	12
2014–2015	0	1	6	8
Total	0	2	8	20
