= 2010–11 Premier Arena Soccer League season =

Premier Arena Soccer League
- Season: 2010-11
- Champions: Las Vegas Knights (by forfeit)

The 2010–11 Premier Arena Soccer League season consisted of 6 divisions of 32 teams across the US. The Premier Arena Soccer League continues to serve as the developmental league to the PASL-Pro.

== Standings ==
As of March 5, 2011
2010-11 League Championship
2010-11 National Finals Entrant (Bold Division Winner)

Place	Team	GP	W/L	Pct	Pts
Pacific Division
1	South Natomas All Stars	8	8-0	1.000	24
2	Chico Bigfoot	8	4-2-2	.625	14
3	Soccer World Elk Grove	8	4-3-1	.563	13
4	Turlock Express	8	1-6-1	.188	4
5	Merced Atlas	8	1-7	.125	3
Southwest Division
1	San Diego Fusion	8	5-2-1	.688	16
2	Las Vegas Knights	8	5-2-1	.688	16
3	Arizona Heat	8	5-3	.625	15
4	Los Angeles Bolts	8	3-4-1	.438	10
5	ASC Warriors	8	2-5-1	.313	7
6	CF Revolucion Tijuana	8	2-6	.250	6
Rocky Mountain Division
1	Colorado Springs Blizzard	8	7-1	.875	21
2	Fort Collins Fury	8	7-1	.875	21
3	Edwards Freedom	8	3-5	.375	9
4	Northern Colorado Cutthroats	8	2-6	.250	6
5	Golden Strikers	8	1-7	.125	3
South Central Division
1	Vitesse Dallas	8	6-1-1	.813	19
2	DFW Tornados	7	5-1-1	.786	16
3	Niño Soccer Club	8	3-4-1	.438	10
4	FC Austin	8	2-5-1	.313	7
5	Lubbock Lonestar	8	2-5-1	.313	7
6	Alamo City Warriors	7	1-3-3	.357	6
Northwest Division
1	WSA Rapids	8	4-4	.500	12
2	Snohomish Skyhawks	8	2-5-1	.313	7
3	Central Oregon Steelheaders	8	2-6	.250	6
Midwest Division
1	Cincinnati Kings Reserves	8	6-2	.750	18
2	Evansville Crush	8	5-2-1	.688	16
3	FC Indiana	8	4-4	.500	12
4	Cincinnati Saints	8	3-3-2	.500	11
5	Piasa FC	8	3-4-1	.438	10
6	Louisville Lightning Reserves	8	3-5	.375	9
7	Paducah Wildcats	8	0-7-1	.063	1

== Division playoffs ==
South Central Division
Finals

- Sun. Feb. 27: Vitesse Dallas 8, DFW Tornados 5

== 2010-11 PASL-Premier Finals ==
The finals were played at Las Vegas, Nevada, on March 4–5, 2011.

Preliminary Round: Fri. March 4, 2011

Place	Team	GP	W/L	Pct	GF	GA
Group A
1	Las Vegas Knights	2	2-0	1.000	15	2
2	Chico Bigfoot	2	1-1	.500	6	8
3	Colorado Springs Blizzard	2	0-2	.000	1	12
Group B
1	Vitesse Dallas	2	2-0	1.000	15	8
2	Evansville Crush	2	1-1	.500	13	15
3	CF Revolucion Tijuana	2	0-2	.000	8	13
Group C
1	South Natomas All Stars	2	2-0	1.000	13	7
2	WSA Rapids	2	1-1	.500	10	11
3	Los Angeles Bolts	2	0-2	.000	9	14
Group D
1	San Diego Fusion	2	1-0-1	.750	8	6
2	ASC Warriors	2	0-0-2	.500	5	5
3	Cincinnati Kings Reserves	2	0-1-1	.250	7	9

- 9:15 am - Evansville Crush 7, CF Revolucion Tijuana 6
- 9:15 am - WSA Rapids 7, Los Angeles Bolts 4
- 10:00 am - Las Vegas Knights 7, Chico Bigfoot 2
- 10:00 am - San Diego Fusion 2, ASC Warriors 2
- 10:45 am - Vitesse Dallas 6, CF Revolucion Tijuana 2
- 10:45 am - South Natomas All Stars 7, Los Angeles Bolts 5
- 11:30 am - Chico Bigfoot 4, Colorado Springs Blizzard 1
- 11:30 am - ASC Warriors 3, Cincinnati Kings Reserves 3
- 12:15 pm - Vitesse Dallas 9, Evansville Crush 6
- 12:15 pm - South Natomas All Stars 6, WSA Rapids 3
- 1:00 pm - Las Vegas Knights 8, Colorado Springs Blizzard 0
- 1:00 pm - San Diego Fusion 6, Cincinnati Kings Reserves 4

Knockout Round

Elimination; March 4
C2	WSA Rapids	3
D3	Cincinnati Kings Reserves	6
D2	ASC Warriors	4
C3	Los Angeles Bolts	2
A2	Chico Bigfoot	7
B3	CF Revolucion Tijuana	1
B2	Evansville Crush	3
A3	Colorado Springs Blizzard	8

Quarterfinals; March 5
A1	Las Vegas Knights	3
D3	Cincinnati Kings Reserves	2
D2	ASC Warriors	1
B1	Vitesse Dallas	4
A2	Chico Bigfoot	2
D1	San Diego Fusion	3
A3	Colorado Springs Blizzard	2
C1	South Natomas All Stars	3

Semifinals; March 5
A1	Las Vegas Knights	5
B1	Vitesse Dallas	3
D1	San Diego Fusion	6
C1	South Natomas All Stars	5

Championship; March 5
A1	Las Vegas Knights	3
D1	San Diego Fusion	0

Fri. March 4, 2011
Elimination Round

- Game 13 - 1:45 pm - Colorado Springs Blizzard 8, Evansville Crush 3
- Game 14 - 1:45 pm - Cincinnati Kings Reserves 6, WSA Rapids 3
- Game 15 - 2:30 pm - Chico Bigfoot 7, CF Revolucion Tijuana 1
- Game 16 - 4:00 pm - ASC Warriors 4, Los Angeles Bolts 2

Sat. March 5, 2011
Quarterfinals

- Game 17 - 9:00 am - Las Vegas Knights 3, Cincinnati Kings Reserves 2
- Game 18 - 9:55 am - San Diego Fusion 3, Chico Bigfoot 2
- Game 19 - 10:50 am - Vitesse Dallas 4, ASC Warriors 1
- Game 20 - 11:45 am - South Natomas All Stars 3, Colorado Springs Blizzard 2

Semifinals

- Game 21 - 1:30 pm - Las Vegas Knights 5, Vitesse Dallas 3
- Game 22 - 2:25 pm - San Diego Fusion 6, South Natomas All Stars 5 (Shootout)

Finals

- Game 23 - 4:15 pm - Las Vegas Knights 3, San Diego Fusion 0 (Forfeit)
