= Vitesse Dallas =

- Full name: Vitesse Dallas
- Founded: 2007
- Ground: Arlington Indoor Center (2008–Present)
- Capacity: 500
- Manager: (United States) Roy Ramos
- League: Premier Arena Soccer League
Home colors	Away colors

Vitesse Dallas is an indoor soccer team in the United States, founded in 2007. The team is a member of the Premier Arena Soccer League. Vitesse has won two PASL-Premier Championships (2008/09 and 2011/12).

The team plays its home games at Arlington Indoor Center in the city of Grand Prairie, Texas, 14 miles south-west of downtown Dallas. The club's colors are red and royal.

== Year-by-year ==
Year	Division	League	Reg. season	Playoffs

== Honors ==
- 2009 PASL-Premier Winter National Champions
- 2012 PASL-Premier Winter National Champions

== Coaches ==
- (United States) Roy Ramos 2008–present

== Stadia ==
- Arlington Indoor Center, Grand Prairie, Texas 2008–present

== See also ==
- Vitesse Arnhem, a Dutch soccer team
