= Cleveland Freeze =

American indoor soccer team

- Founded: 2013
- Dissolved: 2014
- Ground: Soccer Sportsplex; North Olmsted, Ohio
- Capacity: 1,000
- President/GM: Scott Snider
- Head Coach: Hector Marinaro
- League: Professional Arena Soccer League
- Website: http://www.clevelandfreeze.com/
Home colors	Away colors

Cleveland Freeze was a professional indoor soccer team based in the Cleveland, suburb of North Olmsted, Ohio. They began play in the Professional Arena Soccer League (PASL) for the 2013–14 PASL season. The Freeze hired Hector Marinaro, the all-time leader in points and goals in professional indoor soccer, as their head coach on September 24, 2013. Their mascot is the Abominable Snowman.

== Year-by-year ==
League champions	Runners-up	Division champions*	Playoff berth

Year	League	Reg. season	GF	GA	Pct	Finish	Playoffs	Avg. attendance
2013–14	PASL	10-6	173	134	.625	3rd, Eastern	Semi-Finals	481

== Playoff record ==
Year	Win	Loss	GF	GA	Avg. attendance
2013-2014	2	2	26	28	471
Total	2	2	26	28	471

== Final roster ==
Note: Flags indicate national team as defined under FIFA eligibility rules; some limited exceptions apply. Players may hold more than one non-FIFA nationality.

No.	Pos.	Nation	Player
0	GK	USA	Ryan Hulings
1	GK	USA	Mike Mason
2	DF	USA	Jared Miller
3	DF	USA	David Jordan
4	MF	USA	J Patrie
7	MF	USA	Louis Kastelic
8	DF	USA	Michael Green
9	FW	RSA	Dean Miller
10	MF	USA	Steve Gillespie
11	FW	USA	Chris Green
12	DF	USA	Josh Grossman

No.	Pos.	Nation	Player
13	DF	USA	John Ball
16	DF	USA	John Gulden
19	MF	USA	Stefan Ostergen
22	FW	USA	Michael Schmid
23	DF	USA	Anthony Grazetti
24	MF	USA	Manuel Conde
26	MF	USA	Cameron Johnson
33	FW	USA	Allen Eller
80	MF	USA	Scott Cunningham
90	GK	SRB	Mirko Petkovic
99	FW	USA	Alex Bernot

== Staff ==
=== Ownership ===
Scott Snider, Louis Kastelic, Dave Gaddis, Chris Snider, and Chris Cole

=== Front office ===
- (United States) Scott Snider - President & General Manager
- (United States) Louis Kastelic - Director of Team Operations

=== Coaching staff ===
- (Canada) Hector Marinaro - Head Coach
