= FC Adrenaline =

Coordinates: 38.73445°N 90.071878°W

- Full name: Football Club Adrenaline
- Founded: 2007
- Ground: The Field Sports Complex; Pontoon Beach, Illinois
- Capacity: 1,100
- Owner: Jose Delgado
- League: Premier Arena Soccer League
- 2014–15: 1st, Midwest
- Website: http://www.fcadrenaline.com
Home colors	Away colors

FC Adrenaline is an American professional indoor soccer team, founded in 2007.

The team played in the Premier Arena Soccer League from 2007–2010 as "Piasa FC". The club moved to the Professional Arena Soccer League (PASL) in 2010 as "Illinois Piasa" under head coach Jerry Lakin.

They originally played their home matches at the Soccer for Fun Arena in Granite City, Illinois. From 2011 through 2013, Piasa played their home games at The Sports Academy in Glen Carbon, Illinois. In July 2013, the Piasa announced that they would play the 2013–14 PASL season at The Field Sports Complex in Pontoon Beach, Illinois.

Jason Norsic, the team's head coach, announced his resignation on July 22, 2013, citing personal and family obligations. Doug Montroy was named as his replacement. On January 11, 2014, the team "parted ways" with Montroy and assistant coach Ed Rulo was named interim head coach for the remainder of the 2013–14 season.

In April 2014, The Field Sports Complex acquired all properties related to Illinois Piasa.

TFSC announced the rebranding of the club as FC Adrenaline in August 2014. The club will compete in the Premier Arena Soccer League during the 2014–15 season.

== Year-by-year ==
League champions	Runners-up	Division champions	Playoff berth

Year	League	Reg. season	GF	GA	Finish	Playoffs	Avg. attendance
2007–08	PASL Premier	1-6-1	58	133	4th, Midwest	Did not qualify	—
2008–09	PASL Premier	2-2-4	33	41	4th, Midwest	Did not qualify	—
2009–10	PASL Premier	3-3-2	45	47	3rd, Midwest	Did not qualify	—
2010–11	PASL Pro	9–3	99	65	1st, Frontier	Wild Card playoff	—
2011–12	PASL Pro	6–10	101	116	4th, Eastern	Division playoff	394
2012–13	PASL Pro	4–12	89	132	4th, Eastern	Did not qualify	329
2013–14	PASL Pro	2–13	62	145	6th, Eastern	Did not qualify	299
2014–15	PASL	9-1-0	83	31	1st, Midwest	Semifinalist	—

== Piasa name ==
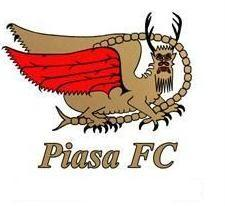
Original logo (2006-10)

The club's original name comes from the mythical Piasa Bird, a Native American legend from the Alton, Illinois, area just outside St. Louis. The legend says there is a giant bird that lives in the caves of the Mississippi River bluffs near Alton that kidnaps people, then proceeds to devour them in his lair.
