= Premier Arena Soccer League =

- Founded: 1997; 29 years ago
- Folded: 2024
- Country: United States; Mexico
- Confederation: World Minifootball Federation
- Number of clubs: 17 (M), 15 (W)
- Domestic cup: U.S. Open
- Last champions: Oklahoma City Oblivion (M); Cincinnati Sirens (W) (2022-23)
- Most championships: Vitesse Dallas (2)
- Website: www.arenaleague.com

The Premier Arena Soccer League (PASL) was a professional men's and women's indoor soccer league; along with a number of amateur teams across North America. The PASL was previously known as the Federation of Sports Arenas (FSA). The PASL logo formerly belonged to what is now the Major Arena Soccer League.

Established in 1998, the PASL has been at the forefront of promoting and advancing the sport of indoor soccer for over 25 years. The league provides a platform for talented athletes to compete at the highest level and has played a crucial role in the growth of indoor soccer across the country.

PASL is an affiliated member of the Pan-American Minifootball Federation and the World Minifootball Federation. In 2024, the PASL was acquired by Auden Enterprises

Founders

Kevin Milliken - Off the Wall Soccer, Chico, CA

Jan Eric Nordmo - Off the Wall Soccer, Santa Clara, CA Chico, CA Hillsboro, OR

== Teams ==
PASL Men's clubs
Team	City
Austin Emerald FC	Austin, Texas
Austin Shootout FC	Austin, Texas
Baton Rouge IFC	Baton Rouge, Louisiana
Brew City Legends FC	Milwaukee, Wisconsin
Chicago Mustangs	Hoffman Estates, Illinois
Cincinnati Swerve	Cincinnati, Ohio
Detroit Waza Flo	Melvindale, Michigan
Elizabethtown Ignite FC	Elizabethtown, Kentucky
Houston Bolt FC	Houston, Texas
Houston Fury FC	Houston, Texas
FC Indiana Lions	Lafayette, Indiana
Kansas City Barilleros FC	Kansas City, Kansas
Kansas City Cyclones	Kansas City, Kansas
Kenosha United FC	Kenosha, Wisconsin
Metro Louisville FC	Louisville, Kentucky
Oklahoma City Oblivian	Oklahoma City, Oklahoma
Wichita Selection	Wichita, Kansas
Youngstown Nighthawks	Youngstown, Ohio

PASL Women's clubs
Team	City
Austin Fierce United	Austin, Texas
Chicago Mustangs	Hoffman Estates, Illinois
Chihuahua Savage	Chihuahua City, Chihuahua, Mexico
Cincinnati Sirens	Cincinnati, Ohio
Cincinnati Sirens Academy	Cincinnati, Ohio
Columbus Eagles FC	Columbus, Ohio
Dallas NXT Image	Dallas, Texas
Dallas Select	Dallas, Texas
Grand Rapids Wanderers	Grand Rapids, Michigan
Houston Aspire FC	Houston, Texas
New Mexico Lightning	Albuquerque, New Mexico
Omaha Queens FC	Omaha, Nebraska
San Antonio Slayers FC	San Antonio, Texas
Turlock Express	Turlock, California
Wichita Aero FC	Wichita, Kansas

== Men's champions ==
Year	Summer	Year	Winter
1998	OTW Santa Clara		
1999	OTW Santa Clara		
2000	ISA 2000		
2001	OTW Sacramento		
2002	OTW Sacramento		
2003	Bladium Hornets	2003–04	Minnesota Blast
2004	Tacoma Stars	2004–05	Mass Aztecs
2005	San Diego Fusion	2005–06	OTW Sacramento
2006	Cuernavaca	2006–07	Studio Brasil (Dallas)
2007	Stockton Pumas	2007–08	Detroit Waza
2008	OTW Santa Clara	2008–09	Vitesse Dallas
2009	OTW Santa Clara	2009–10	Tacoma Stars
2010	Fort Collins Fury	2010–11	Las Vegas Knights (by forfeit)
2011	OTW Santa Clara	2011–12	Vitesse Dallas
2012	Las Vegas Knights	2012–13	Bladium Rosal
2013	Las Vegas Knights	2013–14	Chicago Mustangs Premier
2014	Turlock Express Premier	2014–15	Dallas Elite FC
2015	San Diego Sockers Premier	2015–16	Rio Grande Valley Devils
2016	No season	2016–17	Digitlog FC
2017	No season	2017–18	Tulsa Tornadoes
2018	No season	2018–19	Cincinnati Swerve 2
2019	No season	2019–20	Springfield Demize
2020	No season	2020–21	Metro Louisville FC
2021	No season	2021–22	Metro Louisville FC
2022	No season	2022–23	Oklahoma City Oblivion

== Women's champions ==
Year	Team
2008	OTW Santa Clara
2009	Chico United
2010	Denver Sizzle
2011	Soccer World Elk Grove
2012	Soccer World Elk Grove
2013	Soccer World Elk Grove
2014	Arizona Impact
2018–19	Cincinnati Sirens
2019–20	Cincinnati Sirens
2020–21	Chicago Mustangs
2021–22	Cincinnati Sirens
2022–23	Cincinnati Sirens
